= Maag =

Maag is a surname. Notable persons with that name include:

- Bruno Maag (born 1962), Swiss type designer
- Dan Maag (born 1975), German film producer
- Karin Maag (born 1962), German politician
- Natalie Maag (born 1997), Swiss luger
- Peter Maag (1919–2001), Swiss conductor
- Ron Maag (born 1945), American politician

== See also ==
- AnnaSofia Mååg (born 1968), Swedish ice artist
- Dr. R. Maag, a Swiss chemical company
- MAAG
