= Can't Get This Stuff No More =

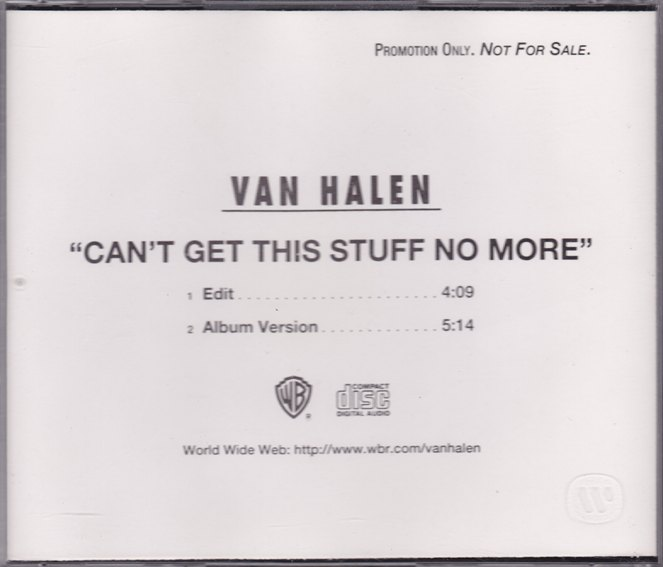

Promotional single by Van Halen

from the album Best Of – Volume I
- Released: February 7, 1997
- Recorded: 1996
- Genre: Hard rock
- Length: 5:16
- Label: Warner Bros.
- Songwriters: Eddie Van Halen, Michael Anthony, David Lee Roth, Alex Van Halen
- Producer: Glen Ballard

Van Halen singles chronology
| "Me Wise Magic" (1996) | "Can't Get This Stuff No More" (1997) | "Without You" (1998) |

"Can't Get This Stuff No More" is a song on American hard rock band Van Halen's 1996 compilation Best Of – Volume I. The song was one of two new songs recorded exclusively for the album (the other being "Me Wise Magic").

== Recording ==
As Eddie Van Halen and David Lee Roth got in touch again due to the upcoming compilation, Eddie decided to invite Roth to perform on two new songs. The music for this song was based on a track called the "Backdoor Shuffle" which was originally part of the sessions for the Balance album. "Can't Get This Stuff No More" is also Eddie Van Halen's only use of a talk box, which was actually operated by guitar technician Matt Bruck as Eddie felt "it just sounded like a wah-wah" when he used it himself.

There's also a faint sound of a Hammond-sounding organ during the second verse.

== Release ==
The song was written and recorded by the reunited original members Eddie Van Halen, Alex Van Halen, David Lee Roth and Michael Anthony, and subsequently released on Van Halen's 1996 compilation Best Of – Volume I. The reunion fell apart a month before the release of Best of Volume I.
