= I Can't Stop Loving You (disambiguation) =

"I Can't Stop Loving You" is a song by Don Gibson, also recorded by Ray Charles, Conway Twitty, Kitty Wells and others.

I Can't Stop Loving You may also refer to:

- "I Can't Stop Loving You (Though I Try)", song by Billy Nicholls, recorded by Leo Sayer, Phil Collins and others
- "Can't Stop Lovin' You", song by Van Halen
- "Can't Stop Lovin' You" (Aerosmith song), by Aerosmith and Carrie Underwood
- "I Just Can't Stop Loving You", song by Michael Jackson
- "I Can't Stop Loving You", song by Kem
- "Can't Stop Loving You", a song by Tony Waddington and Wayne Bickerton recorded by The Flirtations and Tom Jones, both released 1970
- "Can't Stop Loving You", by James Oliver, contestant for the Eurovision Song Contest 1989
- "Can't Stop Loving You", by Sara Evans and Isaac Slade from Evans' album Slow Me Down
