= Best Of – Volume I (Van Halen album) =

Greatest hits album by Van Halen
- Released: October 22, 1996
- Recorded: 1977–1996
- Genres: Hard rock, heavy metal
- Length: 71:33
- Label: Warner Bros.
- Producers: Ted Templeman, Mick Jones, Donn Landee, Van Halen, Andy Johns, Bruce Fairbairn, Glen Ballard

Van Halen chronology
Balance (1995)	Best Of – Volume I (1996)	Van Halen III (1998)

Singles from Best Of – Volume I
- 1. "Humans Being" Released: July 1996; 2. "Me Wise Magic" Released: November 1996; 3. "Jump" Released: December 1996 (Japan)

Professional ratings
Review scores
Source	Rating
AllMusic	link
Q	link
Christgau's Consumer Guide	(1-star Honorable Mention)
The Rolling Stone Album Guide	link

Best Of – Volume I is the first greatest hits album by American hard rock band Van Halen, released on October 22, 1996.

The album does not contain any songs from the band's 1982 album Diver Down. Best Of – Volume I also features "Humans Being", the band's contribution to the Twister soundtrack. The two newly recorded songs, "Can't Get This Stuff No More" and "Me Wise Magic", at the end of the album are with original lead vocalist David Lee Roth. These two songs were released as singles to promote this compilation. They are also the last songs recorded and released by the original Van Halen lineup of Eddie Van Halen, Alex Van Halen, Roth and Michael Anthony. Some demos recorded by the original lineup in 2000 would later be re-recorded by the Van Halen brothers, Wolfgang Van Halen, and Roth for A Different Kind of Truth, released in 2012. Anthony did not play with Van Halen again following the band's 2004 tour. He was replaced by Eddie's son Wolfgang.

Initial pressings of the album contained an alternate edit of "Runnin' with the Devil" where the verses, chorus and solos were arranged in a different order than that of the original album version. It was reported that this was accidental and subsequent pressings have replaced this version with the one found on Van Halen. This edit was also used for the soundtrack to the 1999 film Detroit Rock City. As of 2025, it was still the version found on streaming platforms for the soundtrack.

The album itself sparked a great deal of in-band controversy because of the personnel issues surrounding the band at the time. Sammy Hagar by this time had been a member of Van Halen for eleven years, equal to the amount of time as the previous lead vocalist, David Lee Roth. Hagar saw his conflicts with the Van Halen brothers grow while recording earlier in 1996 for the Twister soundtrack, resulting in the song "Humans Being" (eventually included in Best Of) and an unfinished track called "Between Us Two". When called about completing "Between Us Two" for a greatest hits album, Hagar was angry given his opposition to such a compilation as opposed to an album of entirely new material, declaring that “We’re not a greatest-hits kind of band. We made great albums and sold out concerts all over the world, and we do not need to rely on the past. . . . We spent 11 years trying to bury the past and make the music different and expand and grow.” Eventually he left the band in June, and the Van Halens began working with David Lee Roth on new material for inclusion on the disc. This was not to last, as Roth and Eddie Van Halen clashed publicly and the band once again was without a lead singer, before hiring Gary Cherone. All songs except "Humans Being", "Can't Get This Stuff No More", and "Me Wise Magic" are included on the band's subsequent greatest hits album The Best of Both Worlds (2004).

Despite the aforementioned friction, the album went on to win Metal Edge magazine's 1996 Readers' Choice Award for "Best Hits or Compilation Album". Hagar shares the accolade with Roth, since the album features material from both singers.

== Track listing ==
No.	Title	Writer(s)	Original album	Length
1.	"Eruption"	Michael Anthony; David Lee Roth; Alex Van Halen; Edward Van Halen	Van Halen, 1978	1:42
2.	"Ain't Talkin' 'bout Love"	Anthony; Roth; A. Van Halen; E. Van Halen	Van Halen	3:47
3.	"Runnin' with the Devil"	Anthony; Roth; A. Van Halen; E. Van Halen	Van Halen	3:32
4.	"Dance the Night Away"	Anthony; Roth; A. Van Halen; E. Van Halen	Van Halen II, 1979	3:04
5.	"And the Cradle Will Rock..."	Anthony; Roth; A. Van Halen; E. Van Halen	Women and Children First, 1980	3:31
6.	"Unchained"	Anthony; Roth; A. Van Halen; E. Van Halen	Fair Warning, 1981	3:27
7.	"Jump"	Anthony; Roth; A. Van Halen; E. Van Halen	1984, 1984	4:04
8.	"Panama"	Anthony; Roth; A. Van Halen; E. Van Halen	1984	3:31
9.	"Why Can't This Be Love"	Anthony; Sammy Hagar; A. Van Halen; E. Van Halen	5150, 1986	3:45
10.	"Dreams"	Anthony; Hagar; A. Van Halen; E. Van Halen	5150	4:54
11.	"When It's Love"	Anthony; Hagar; A. Van Halen; E. Van Halen	OU812, 1988	5:36
12.	"Poundcake"	Anthony; Hagar; A. Van Halen; E. Van Halen	For Unlawful Carnal Knowledge, 1991	5:22
13.	"Right Now"	Anthony; Hagar; A. Van Halen; E. Van Halen	For Unlawful Carnal Knowledge	5:21
14.	"Can't Stop Lovin' You"	Anthony; Hagar; A. Van Halen; E. Van Halen	Balance, 1995	4:08
15.	"Humans Being"	Anthony; Hagar; A. Van Halen; E. Van Halen	Twister soundtrack, 1996	5:14
16.	"Can't Get This Stuff No More"	Anthony; Roth; A. Van Halen; E. Van Halen	New song, 1996	5:16
17.	"Me Wise Magic"	Anthony; Roth; A. Van Halen; E. Van Halen	New song	6:09
Total length:				71:33

== Personnel ==
Van Halen

- David Lee Roth – lead vocals (tracks 2–8, 16 & 17)
- Sammy Hagar – lead vocals (tracks 9–15), rhythm guitar (track 13)
- Edward Van Halen – lead guitar, rhythm guitar, keyboards, backing vocals, electric drill (track 12)
- Michael Anthony – bass, backing vocals
- Alex Van Halen – drums, percussion, backing vocals (tracks 12, 13)

=== Production ===
- Glen Ballard – producer (tracks 16, 17)
- Bruce Fairbairn – producer (tracks 14, 15)
- Andy Johns – producer (tracks 12, 13)
- Mick Jones – producer (tracks 9, 10)
- Don Landee – engineer (tracks 1–11), producer (tracks 9–11)
- Erwin Musper – engineer (track 15)
- Ted Templeman – producer (tracks 1–8, 12, 13)
- Van Halen – producer (tracks 9–13)

== Charts ==
=== Weekly charts ===
Chart (1996–2020)	Peak position
Australian Albums (ARIA)	11
Austrian Albums (Ö3 Austria)	16
Belgian Albums (Ultratop Wallonia)	194
Canadian Albums (RPM)	1
Dutch Albums (Album Top 100)	12
Finnish Albums (Suomen virallinen lista)	3
German Albums (Offizielle Top 100)	7
New Zealand Albums (RMNZ)	2
Norwegian Albums (VG-lista)	36
Scottish Albums (Official Charts)	58
Swedish Albums (Sverigetopplistan)	19
Swiss Albums (Schweizer Hitparade)	26
UK Albums (Official Charts)	45
US Billboard 200	1
US Top Rock Albums (Billboard)	11

=== Year-end charts ===
Chart (1996)	Position
US Billboard 200	119

Chart (1997)	Position
Canadian Hard Rock Albums (Nielsen Soundscan)	13
Dutch Albums (Album Top 100)	47
US Billboard 200	58

== Certifications ==
Region	Certification	Certified units/sales
Argentina (CAPIF)	Gold	30,000^{^}
Australia (ARIA)	Platinum	70,000^{^}
Brazil (Pro-Música Brasil)	Gold	100,000^{*}
Canada (Music Canada)	2× Platinum	200,000^{^}
Finland (Musiikkituottajat)	Gold	22,015
Germany (BVMI)	Gold	250,000^{^}
Japan (RIAJ)	2× Platinum	400,000^{^}
New Zealand (RMNZ)	Gold	7,500^{^}
United Kingdom (BPI)	Gold	100,000^{‡}
United States (RIAA)	3× Platinum	3,000,000^{^}
^{*} Sales figures based on certification alone.^{^} Shipments figures based on certification alone.^{‡} Sales+streaming figures based on certification alone.
