= Van Halen III =

Studio album by Van Halen
- Released: March 17, 1998
- Recorded: March–December 1997
- Studios: 5150 Studios, Studio City, California
- Genre: Hard rock
- Length: 65:22
- Label: Warner Bros.
- Producers: Mike Post; Eddie Van Halen

Van Halen chronology
| Van Halen Best of, Volume I (1996) | Van Halen III (1998) | The Best of Both Worlds (2004) |

Singles from Van Halen III
- 1. "Without You" Released: March 1998; 2. "One I Want" Released: April 1998; 3. "Fire in the Hole" Released: May 1998; 4. "Dirty Water Dog" Released: 1998

Van Halen III is the eleventh studio album by American rock band Van Halen, released on March 17, 1998, by Warner Bros. Records. Produced by Mike Post and Eddie Van Halen, it was the band's first studio album in three years after Balance (1995), the band's only studio album to feature vocalist Gary Cherone, and the last to feature bassist and backing vocalist Michael Anthony, who played bass on three of the album's songs; the rest of the bass parts are played by Eddie Van Halen, whose son Wolfgang replaced Anthony on subsequent recordings. Eddie Van Halen's extensive involvement in the album's production, instrumentation and writing have led some, including Anthony, to consider Van Halen III more of a solo project than a collective band effort. Clocking in at over 65 minutes, Van Halen III is their longest album.

The album reached No. 4 in the United States and achieved Gold status, but was a relative commercial disappointment for the band, whose previous four albums had all been chart-topping, multi-platinum sellers, though the lead single "Without You" performed well on radio. Critical and fan reaction was also largely negative, with criticism directed at its songwriting, production, band performances and length. The lukewarm reception prematurely halted work on a follow-up album with Cherone, who departed soon after. Van Halen III was the band's last studio album for fourteen years until their 2012 comeback A Different Kind of Truth.

== Production ==
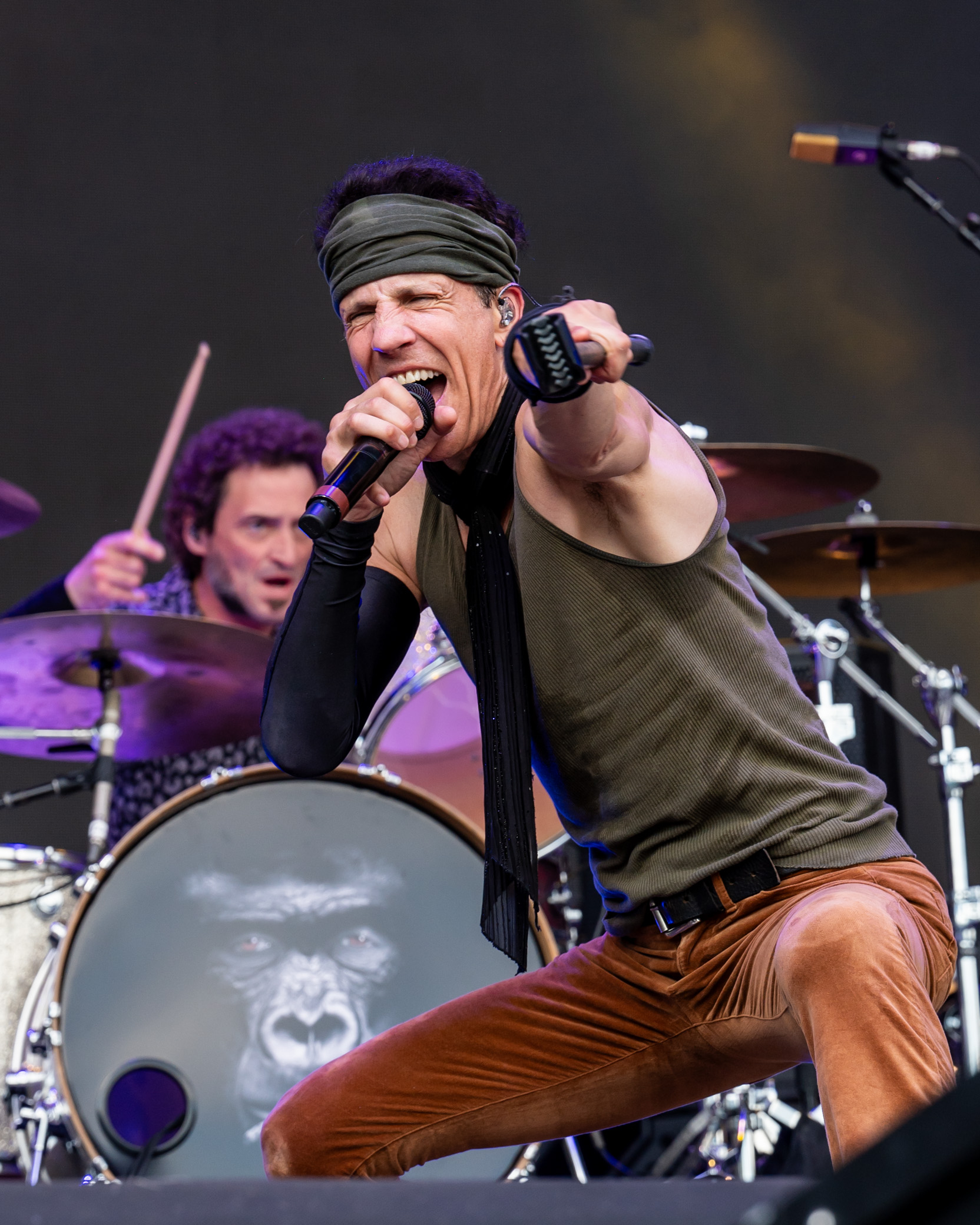
Gary Cherone (pictured in 2024) performed lead vocals on most of the songs on Van Halen III except for "How Many Say I". He joined Van Halen after the band's short reunion with David Lee Roth.

The album's title refers to Van Halen's third recorded line-up, and the band's first two album titles, Van Halen and Van Halen II. Vocalist Sammy Hagar left the group in 1996, and was briefly replaced by original frontman David Lee Roth. Eventually, Roth departed and was replaced by Cherone who had performed with the group Extreme before their amicable breakup.

None of its material is featured on The Best of Both Worlds, the band's 2004 compilation.

As a producer, Eddie brought his friend Mike Post, a veteran songwriter known for composing the themes to television series such as Law & Order. The album's final track, "How Many Say I", was an unusual acoustic piano ballad featuring Eddie on lead vocals, and Cherone on backing vocals: Eddie declared he was forced into singing, and added harmonies so he would not perform alone.

Van Halen III makes minimal use of Michael Anthony on bass guitar. Anthony only played bass on "Without You", "One I Want" & "Fire in the Hole"; Eddie Van Halen recorded bass for the rest of the album. After Michael Anthony's departure from Van Halen, he confirmed that Eddie Van Halen dictated to him how to play bass on this record. Anthony also said by the time of making this album, Eddie was playing the bass more as well as drums. "I don't know if Eddie was basically making a solo record, which is what Van Halen III seemed like to me." In recent years, it has been revealed that Alex Van Halen was absent from sessions on the album due to personal problems at the time and did not play on any tracks.

A track entitled "That's Why I Love You" was dropped at the last minute in favor of "Josephina", with "Fire in the Hole" featuring on the Lethal Weapon 4 film soundtrack.

"I would have preferred to tour with them and then put out a record," Cherone told KNAC. "It would have been a better idea to establish myself first and then hit the studio with the band… There were some great ideas and some little gems but it was not a great record. I had fun but at times it was like being a stranger in a strange land."

The album cover is a still picture from stock footage of Frank "Cannonball" Richards, a vaudeville and sideshow performer known for his act of getting shot in the gut with a cannonball.

== Commercial performance ==
Van Halen III debuted on the Billboard 200 at number 4, with 191,000 copies sold. The album has sold over 800,000 copies as of 2022. The album's only significant radio hit was "Without You", which reached No. 1 on the Mainstream Rock Tracks chart on the March 7, 1998, issue of Billboard, and remained there for six weeks. Other songs receiving airplay on rock radio were "Fire in the Hole" and "One I Want".

== Critical reception ==
Professional ratings
Review scores
| Source | Rating |
|---|---|
| AllMusic | 2/5 stars |
| Chicago Tribune | 2/4 stars |
| Entertainment Weekly | B |
| Los Angeles Times | 3/4 stars |
| Rolling Stone | 2/5 stars |
| The Rolling Stone Album Guide | 1/5 stars |

Reception for Van Halen III was mostly mixed to negative. Stephen Thomas Erlewine from AllMusic stated the album fails to break away from the formula that Van Halen had exhausted over 20 years and "suffers from the same problems as Hagar-era Van Halen – limp riffs, weak melodies, and plodding, colorless rhythms." Entertainment Weekly gave it a B grade rating, saying, "judging from the renewed intensity of Eddie’s guitar playing throughout much of III, having a merely competent, relatively ego-free singer seems to have reinvigorated his muse" but goes on to say "How Many Say I", a song Eddie sang lead vocals on, was "cringeworthy" and "unintentionally hilarious". Greg Kot from Rolling Stone gave it 2 stars out of 5 noting, "Cherone sounds disconcertingly like Hagar, full of spleen-busting bluster and incapable of understatement", and "When the band plays it heavy, it mires itself in a Seventies tar pit, with only the chorus of 'Without You' achieving any sort of pop resonance." Kot compliments Eddie's vocals saying, "'How Many Say I' finds the guitarist singing in a disarmingly appealing, nicotine-stained voice over a moody piano melody." Billboard reviewer Paul Verna summed up III as "a wasted opportunity to breathe life into a now-tired formula".

== Track listing ==
All songs credited to Edward Van Halen, Michael Anthony, Gary Cherone and Alex Van Halen.

| No. | Title | Length |
|---|---|---|
| 1. | "Neworld" (Instrumental) | 1:45 |
| 2. | "Without You" | 6:30 |
| 3. | "One I Want" | 5:30 |
| 4. | "From Afar" | 5:24 |
| 5. | "Dirty Water Dog" | 5:27 |
| 6. | "Once" | 7:42 |
| 7. | "Fire in the Hole" | 5:31 |
| 8. | "Josephina" | 5:42 |
| 9. | "Year to the Day" | 8:34 |
| 10. | "Primary" (Instrumental) | 1:27 |
| 11. | "Ballot or the Bullet" | 5:42 |
| 12. | "How Many Say I" | 6:04 |
| Total length: | | 65:22 |

== Personnel ==
=== Van Halen ===
- Gary Cherone – lead vocals (tracks 2–9 and 11), backing vocals on "How Many Say I"
- Edward Van Halen – guitars, bass (tracks 4–6, 8, 9 and 11), keyboards, electric sitar (track 10), backing vocals, lead vocals on "How Many Say I", drums (uncredited), production, engineering
- Michael Anthony – bass (tracks 2, 3 and 7), backing vocals
- Alex Van Halen - drums, percussion

=== Additional personnel ===
- Mike Post – piano on "Neworld", production

=== Technical personnel ===
- Florian Ammon – programming
- Dan Chavkin – photography
- Ian Dye – programming
- The Edward – mixing, mastering
- Erwin Musper – engineers
- Robbes – mixing, mastering
- Ed Rogers – programming
- F. Scott Schafer – coloring
- Eddy Schreyer – mastering
- Stine Schyberg – art direction
- Paul Wight – programming

== Charts ==
=== Weekly charts ===
| Chart (1998) | Peak position |
|---|---|
| Australian Albums (ARIA) | 8 |
| Austrian Albums (Ö3 Austria) | 23 |
| Canadian Albums (Billboard) | 4 |
| Dutch Albums (Album Top 100) | 24 |
| Finnish Albums (Suomen virallinen lista) | 5 |
| French Albums (SNEP) | 49 |
| German Albums (Offizielle Top 100) | 13 |
| Hungarian Albums (MAHASZ) | 2 |
| Japanese Albums (Oricon) | 7 |
| New Zealand Albums (RMNZ) | 14 |
| Norwegian Albums (VG-lista) | 29 |
| Scottish Albums (Official Charts) | 61 |
| Swedish Albums (Sverigetopplistan) | 39 |
| Swiss Albums (Schweizer Hitparade) | 38 |
| UK Albums (Official Charts) | 43 |
| US Billboard 200 | 4 |

=== Year-end charts ===
| Chart (1998) | Position |
|---|---|
| US Billboard 200 | 176 |

== Certifications ==
| Region | Certification | Certified units/sales |
|---|---|---|
| Japan (RIAJ) | Platinum | 200,000^{^} |
| United States (RIAA) | Gold | 500,000^{^} |
^{^} Shipments figures based on certification alone.
