= Amsterdam (Van Halen song) =

1995 single by Van Halen

Single by Van Halen

from the album Balance
- B-side: "Runaround" (live)
- Released: June 26, 1995
- Length: 4:45
- Label: Warner Bros.
- Songwriters: Michael Anthony; Sammy Hagar; Alex Van Halen; Eddie Van Halen
- Producer: Bruce Fairbairn

Van Halen singles chronology
"Not Enough" (1995)	"Amsterdam" (1995)	"Humans Being" (1996)

"Amsterdam" is a song by American rock band Van Halen from their 10th studio album, Balance (1995). It was released as a single to mainstream rock radio and peaked at number nine on the US Billboard Album Rock Tracks chart in mid-1995.

== Background ==
According to a 1995 interview on Dutch radio, the song is based upon Sammy's tourist impression of Amsterdam, such as the freedom he felt in the city.

According to Ian Christe's book Everybody Wants Some: The Van Halen Saga, Eddie and Alex Van Halen didn't like the lyrics, feeling the song did their birthplace a disservice, due to its explicit references to cannabis use (with lines such as "roll an Amsterdam" which undoubtedly references "rolling a joint") and to its little content. Hagar, however, wouldn't budge, as it was about his tourist impression over the memories of the Van Halen family homeland. About this, Eddie said to Guitar World in 1996:

"Well, I wasn't sober before, and I wasn't even listening to the lyrics! It's not like I suddenly wanted Sammy to be my puppet or anything, but once in a while I would take issue with a specific lyric or line. For example, I always hated the words 'wham, bam, Amsterdam,' from Balance, because they were all about smoking pot – they were just stupid. Lyrics should plant some sort of seed for thought, or at least be a little more metamorphical."

== Music video ==
A music video was shot for "Amsterdam" in January 1995 during the band's promotional tour in Amsterdam. After the finishing touches were completed in April, Warner Bros. sent the video to MTV, who sent it back due to the song's references to marijuana, specifically the lyric "Score me some Panama red, yeah." They altered the lyrics for the video for airplay, but MTV still refused to play it. The altered video eventually aired on MuchMusic in Canada.
