= Humans Being =

1996 single by Van Halen

Single by Van Halen

from the album Best Of – Volume I and Twister soundtrack
- B-side: "Respect the Wind"
- Released: April 23, 1996
- Length: 5:14 (album version); 3:28 (single edit)
- Label: Warner Bros.
- Songwriters: Anthony; Hagar; A. Van Halen; E. Van Halen
- Producer: Bruce Fairbairn

Van Halen singles chronology
"Amsterdam" (1995)	"Humans Being" (1996)	"Me Wise Magic" (1996)

Music video
- "Humans Being" on YouTube

"Humans Being" is a song recorded and contributed by American rock band Van Halen for the 1996 disaster film Twister. The song marks the last recording to feature vocalist Sammy Hagar before his departure from the band in June 1996. "Humans Being" was released as a radio-only single in the United States on April 23, 1996, peaking atop the Billboard Mainstream Rock Tracks chart for two weeks later that year. In Japan, the single was released on CD in July 1996.

== Background ==
"Humans Being" was included on both the Twister soundtrack – along with an instrumental by Eddie and Alex, "Respect the Wind" – and the band's Best Of – Volume I compilation, although the version used in the video for the soundtrack release is an edit with 3:28 of the 5:10 length of the album version, removing several solo sections, a bridge, and shortening the ending. The band played it live during the III Tour and the Summer Tour 2004.

== Composition ==
In January 1996, as the band rested following the end of The Balance "Ambulance" Tour in November 1995, manager Ray Danniels suggested to Eddie Van Halen and his brother Alex to write songs for the movie, Twister. Singer Sammy Hagar was reluctant to work on the tracks as his pregnant wife Kari was expected to deliver their child in April, and he felt the Van Halens should fix their medical ailments – Eddie was walking around with a cane on painkillers because of a hip injury caused by avascular necrosis, and Alex had a neck brace on due to a vertebra problem stemming from various injuries over the years. Eventually the singer relented as Danniels talked about the financial benefits of the songs.

"Humans Being", which was written with Alex as Sammy wrote a ballad with Eddie, "Between Us Two", was originally named by the singer as "The Silent Extreme" but Alex eventually gave it the new title. The song's lyrics proved a major source of contention. Alex called the film's director, Jan De Bont, to ask him how closely he wanted the lyrics to be related to the movie's context, to which De Bont replied "Oh, please don't write about tornadoes. I don't want this to be a narrative for the movie." Hagar obliged, and then asked De Bont for some footage of Twister. Considering that film dealt with "the infatuation people have with fear and how it can suck you in", he decided to write lyrics about how "sometimes you're afraid to fall in love with a chick, but she sucks you in anyway." De Bont and Budd Carr also sent Hagar a folder with terms used by storm chasers as the singer felt he could add lyrics with terms such as "suck zone". The brothers still disliked Hagar's first lyrics ("Sky turning black/knuckles turning white/headed for the suck zone"), and he had to come up with new ones.

Hagar wanted to record his vocals from Hawaii, where he and his wife had arranged for a natural delivery of the baby. The band refused, wanting him to work with them at Eddie's 5150 Studios in Los Angeles. After three trips to California, Hagar eventually decided to move with his wife back to his San Francisco home to keep her near. After the first recordings of both songs, Hagar was about to leave for Hawaii when Eddie announced that they wanted to ditch "Between Us Two" and instead extend "Humans Being". Hagar wrote two verses with producer Bruce Fairbairn and recorded them in about an hour and a half before departing for his flight. When a second track ended up being required, attempts to bring Sammy back and rework "Between Us Two" were unsuccessful, so Alex and Eddie instead recorded an instrumental titled "Respect the Wind". The process of recording for the movie ended up being the final straw to Sammy's first tenure with Van Halen, as his and Eddie's continued disagreements reached the breaking point.

== Reception ==
Billboard praised the "tasty riffs and vocal acrobatics" of the song, but AllMusic described it as "one of Van Halen's worst tracks", panning its inclusion on Best of Volume I. Chuck Klosterman of Vulture.com ranked it the 15th-best Van Halen song. The song reached number one on the US Billboard Mainstream Rock Tracks chart for two weeks, becoming the band's 11th chart-topper. It won a 1996 Metal Edge Readers' Choice Award for "Best Song from a Movie Soundtrack."

== Personnel ==
- Eddie Van Halen – guitars, backing vocals
- Alex Van Halen – drums
- Sammy Hagar – lead vocals
- Michael Anthony – bass guitar, backing vocals

== Charts ==
=== Weekly charts ===
Chart (1996)	Peak position
US Mainstream Rock (Billboard)	1

=== Year-end charts ===
Chart (1996)	Position
US Mainstream Rock Tracks (Billboard)	17

== Release history ==
Region	Date	Format(s)	Label(s)	Ref.
United States	April 23, 1996	Contemporary hit radio	Warner Bros.	
Japan	July 10, 1996	CD	Warner Bros.	
