= Panama red =

Strain of cannabis

Panama red, known as Panamanian red, or P.R. is a pure cultivar of Cannabis sativa. Renowned for its potency, it was popular among cannabis users of the 1960s and '70s. The typically high THC levels associated with the variety are thought to be dependent on the particular cultivar, rather than the Panamanian climate. It induces a mellow cerebral high, slight body relaxation, characterized by euphoria and increase in energy, boosts creativity. It can cause anxiety and paranoia in some users.

In a limited test, an Auburn University researcher reported that "seed of a sample of Panama Red, grown in the very different climates of the Canal Zone, when later cultivated on the Auburn campus and in northern New Hampshire, yielded marijuana with similar THC content."

Its name comes from its cultivation in the country of Panama, and its claylike red color. Production was common in Panama's sparsely populated Pearl Islands.

Cannabis cultivation died off in Panama with the rise of cocaine trafficking.

On May 22, 2020, the season 2 of the animated Netflix's series Trailer Park Boys: The Animated Series was released. In the 6th episode "The First Time We Smoked Weed" Panama Red is frequently mentioned.

The cultivar is mentioned in the 1999 film Detroit Rock City and the 2000 film Meet the Parents. "Panama Red" is the name of a song from the album The Yellow Balloon released in 1967 by the sunshine pop band The Yellow Balloon. It is also referenced in the 1979 film Apocalypse Now.

The strain is frequently mentioned in the popular 1970s stoner comic The Fabulous Furry Freak Brothers.

Thomas Pynchon references Panama Red several times throughout his works.

The song "Panama Red" by Peter Rowan, was partly inspired by the strain; and the song "Amsterdam" by Van Halen refers to picking up Panama Red as a subject of the song.
