= Icehotel (Jukkasjärvi) =

Hotel rebuilt each year with snow and ice in northern Sweden

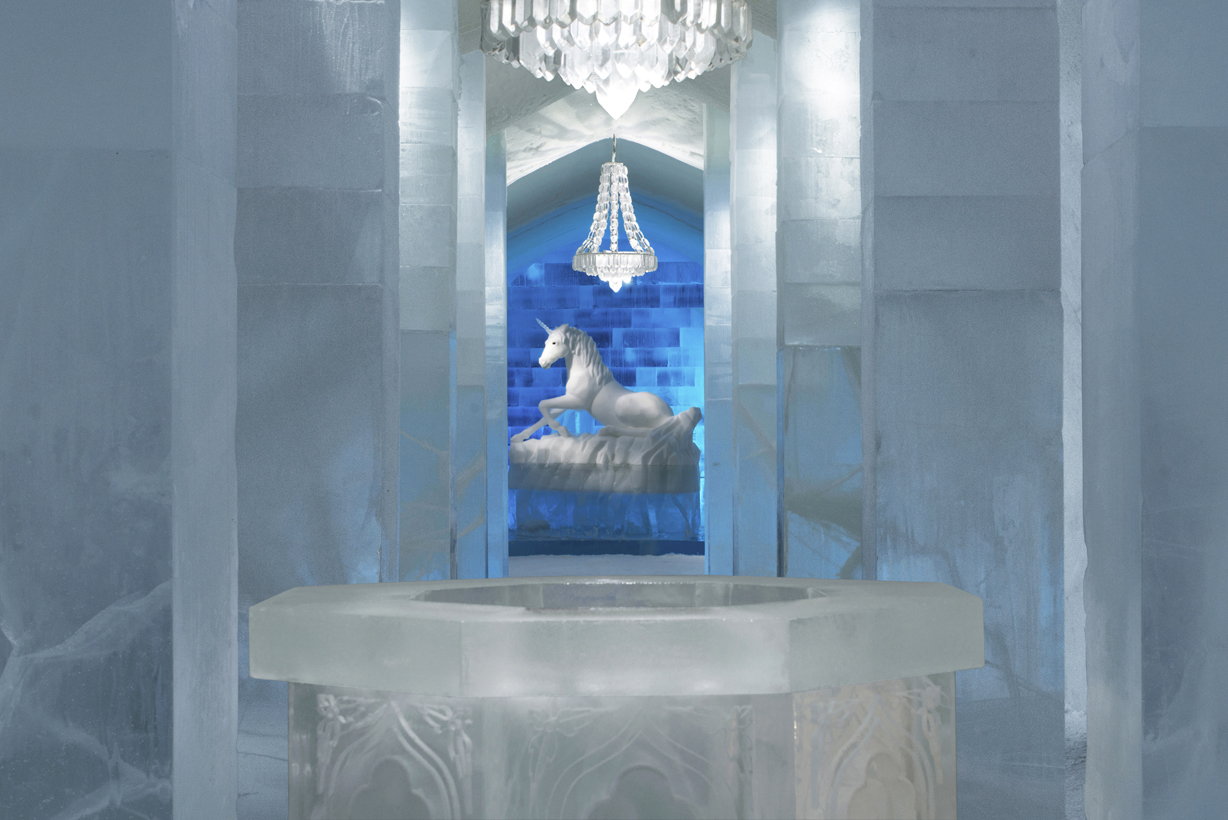
- Icehotel Main Hall (2014) by Alessandro Falca & AnnaSofia Mååg

General information
- Location: Jukkasjärvi, Sweden
- Coordinates: 67°50′59″N 20°35′40″E
- Opening: 1990
- Owner: Yngve Bergqvist

Technical details
- Floor area: 6,000 m^{2} (64,600 sq ft)

Other information
- Number of rooms: 55

Website
- icehotel.com

The Icehotel is a hotel in northern Sweden, about 17 kilometers (11 mi) from Kiruna. It is rebuilt each year with snow and ice in the village of Jukkasjärvi and is the world's first ice hotel.

After its first opening in 1990, the hotel has been rebuilt each year from December to April. The hotel, including the chairs and beds, is constructed from snow and ice blocks taken from the nearby Torne River. Artists are invited to create different rooms and decorations made of ice. The structure remains below freezing point, around −5 °C (23 °F).

== History ==
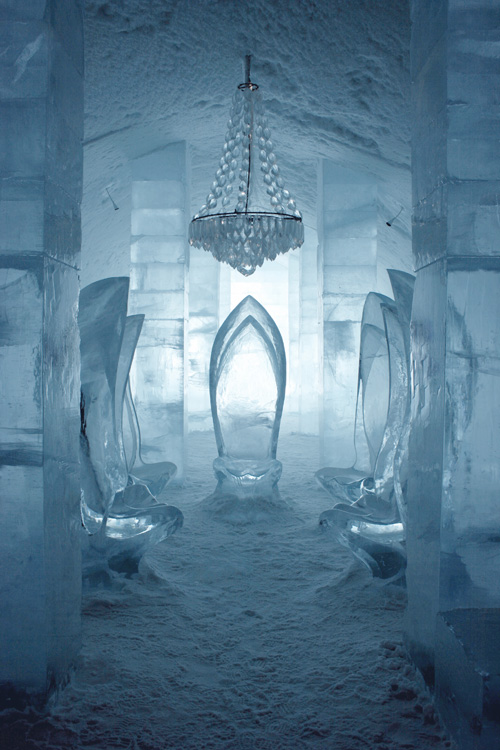
Jukkasjärvi Icehotel interior. Sculptures by Jörgen Westin

In 1989, Japanese ice artists visited the area and created an exhibition of ice art. In Spring 1990, French artist Jannot Derid held an exhibition in a cylinder-shaped igloo in the same area. One night there were no rooms available in the town, so some of the visitors asked for permission to spend the night in the igloo at the exhibition hall. They slept in the igloo in sleeping bags on top of reindeer skins, and were the first guests of the "hotel".

== Hotel ==
The entire hotel is made out of snow and ice blocks from the Torne River; even the glasses in the bar are made of ice. Each spring, around March, Icehotel harvests tons of ice from the frozen Torne River and stores it in a nearby production hall with room for over 900 t (990 short tons) of ice and 27,000 t (30,000 short tons) of snow. The ice is used for creating Icebar designs and ice glasses, which are used for ice sculpting classes, events, and product launches all over the world, while the snow is used for building a strong structure for the building. About 900 t (990 short tons) of what is left is used in the construction of the next Icehotel.

The Icehotel in Jukkasjärvi is known to be the biggest hotel of ice and snow in the world, spanning over some 6,000 square metres (64,600 sq ft). Each suite is unique, and the architecture of the hotel is changed each year as it is rebuilt from scratch. Each year, artists submit their ideas for suites, and a jury selects about 50 artists to create the church, Icebar, reception, main hall, and suites. When spring comes, everything melts away and returns to the Torne River. The Icehotel only exists between December and April, and has been listed as one of the Seven Wonders of Sweden. The northern hemisphere's aurora borealis can be seen during the winter months in the location.

Documentaries that focus on this hotel have been aired on the Discovery Channel, National Geographic., BBC (on Amazing Hotels: Life Beyond the Lobby) and Channel 5. The hotel appeared in a sketch about Sweden in one of the shows of the Eurovision Song Contest 2013, courtesy of Lynda Woodruff. The Icehotel has guests from many countries, and it is reported that over one million guests have visited since its creation, although a large proportion of guests visit without staying overnight.

In 2016, Ice Hotel 365 was announced, which was a permanent version of an Ice Hotel available all year-round.

== Church ==
The local parish of Jukkasjärvi, part of the Swedish Church, runs the Ice Church. Following co-operation with the Icehotel, the Swedish Church operates the Ice Church as a regular church. Each year the church is consecrated at the Christmas Day service. During the winter period, around 140 couples get married and about 20 children are baptized there. Characteristics of a wedding in the Ice Church are the cold, the stillness, and a cappella singing. Reverend Jan-Erik Kuoksu from the Jukkasjärvi parish started the Ice Church. During his 17 years of service, he united 1,500 couples and baptized many children. Kuoksu worked alone as the priest in the Ice Church for the first 14 years. His wife, Lisbeth, volunteers as a church usher.

Hotel rooms and Church

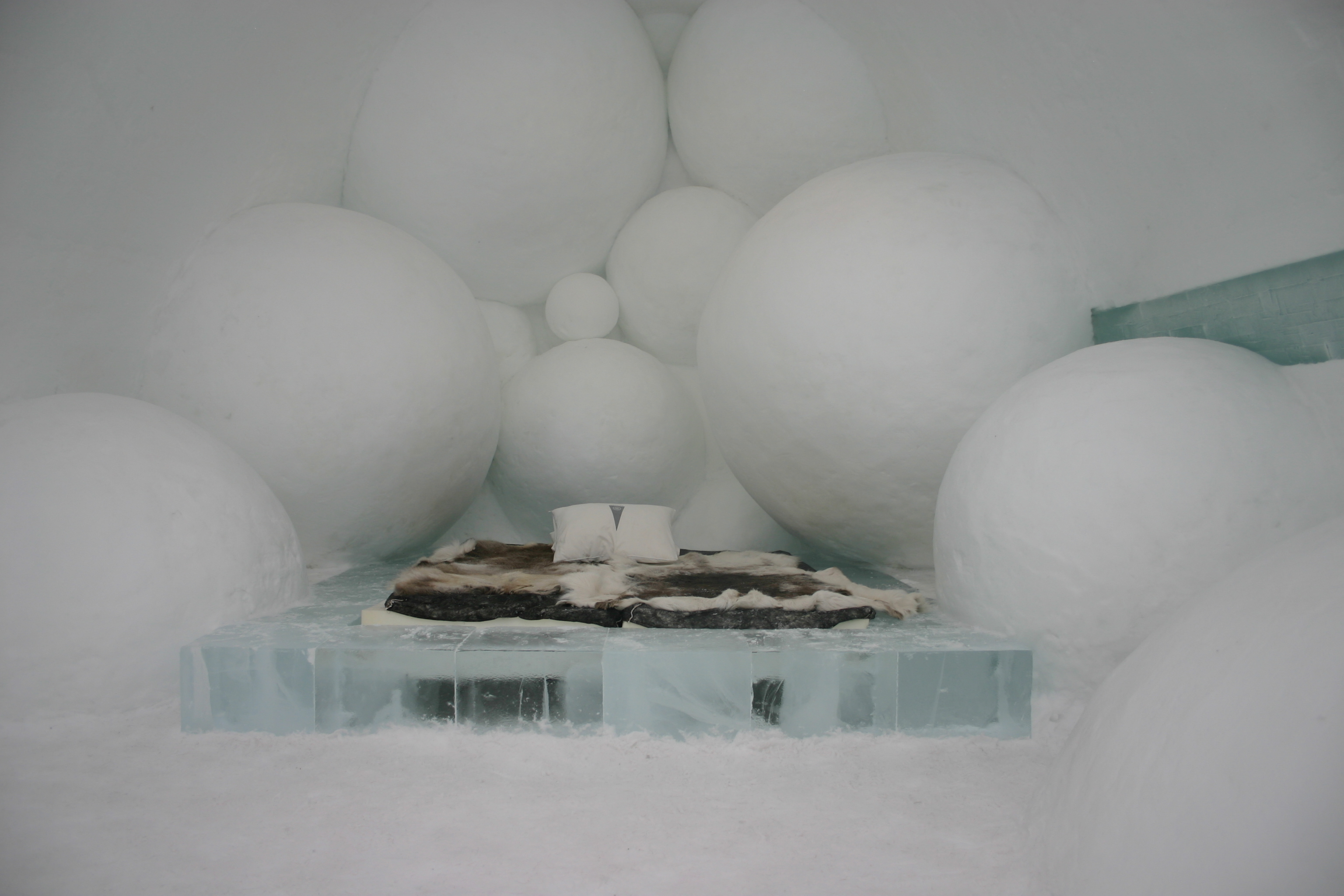
Snowball room

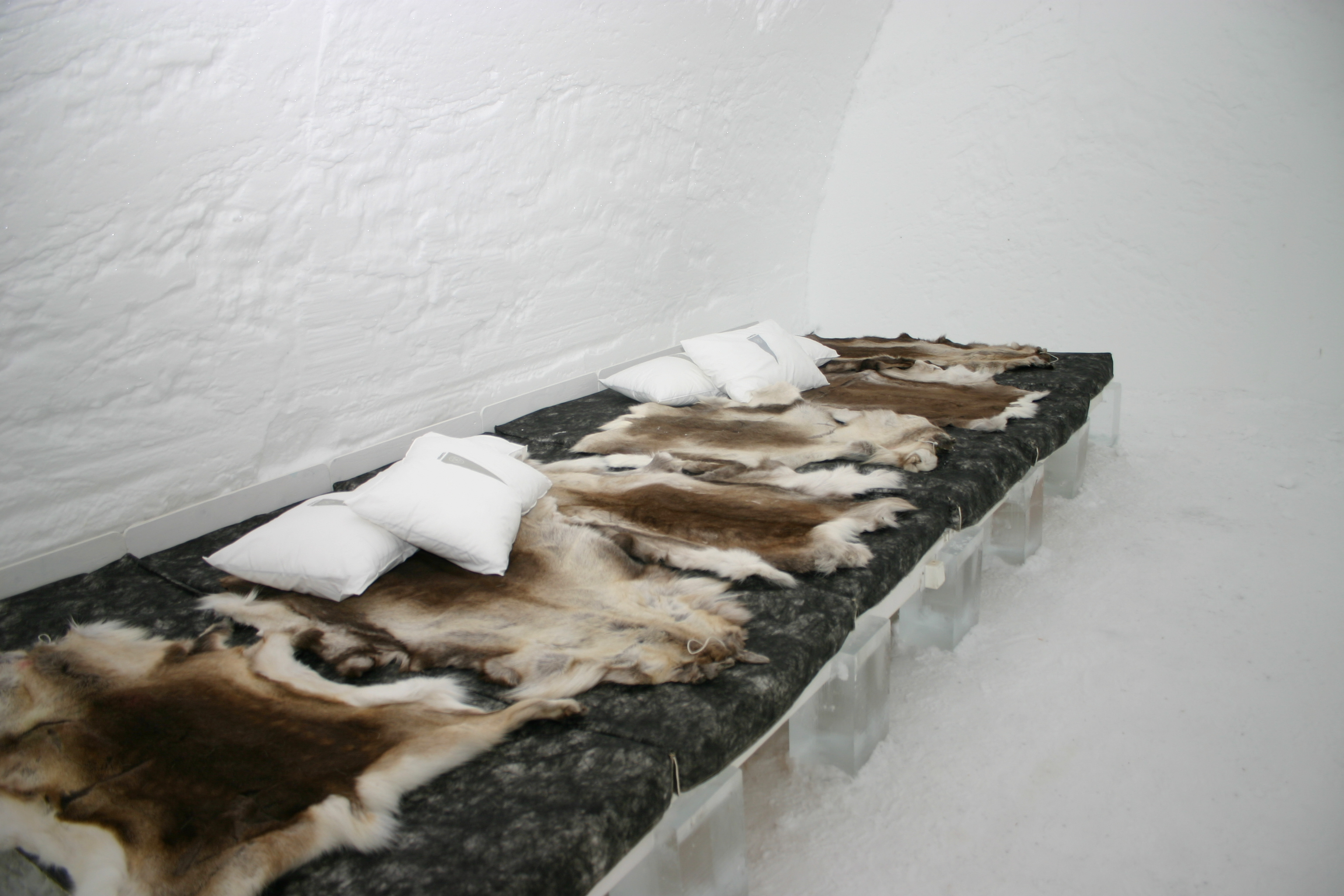
A long sofa

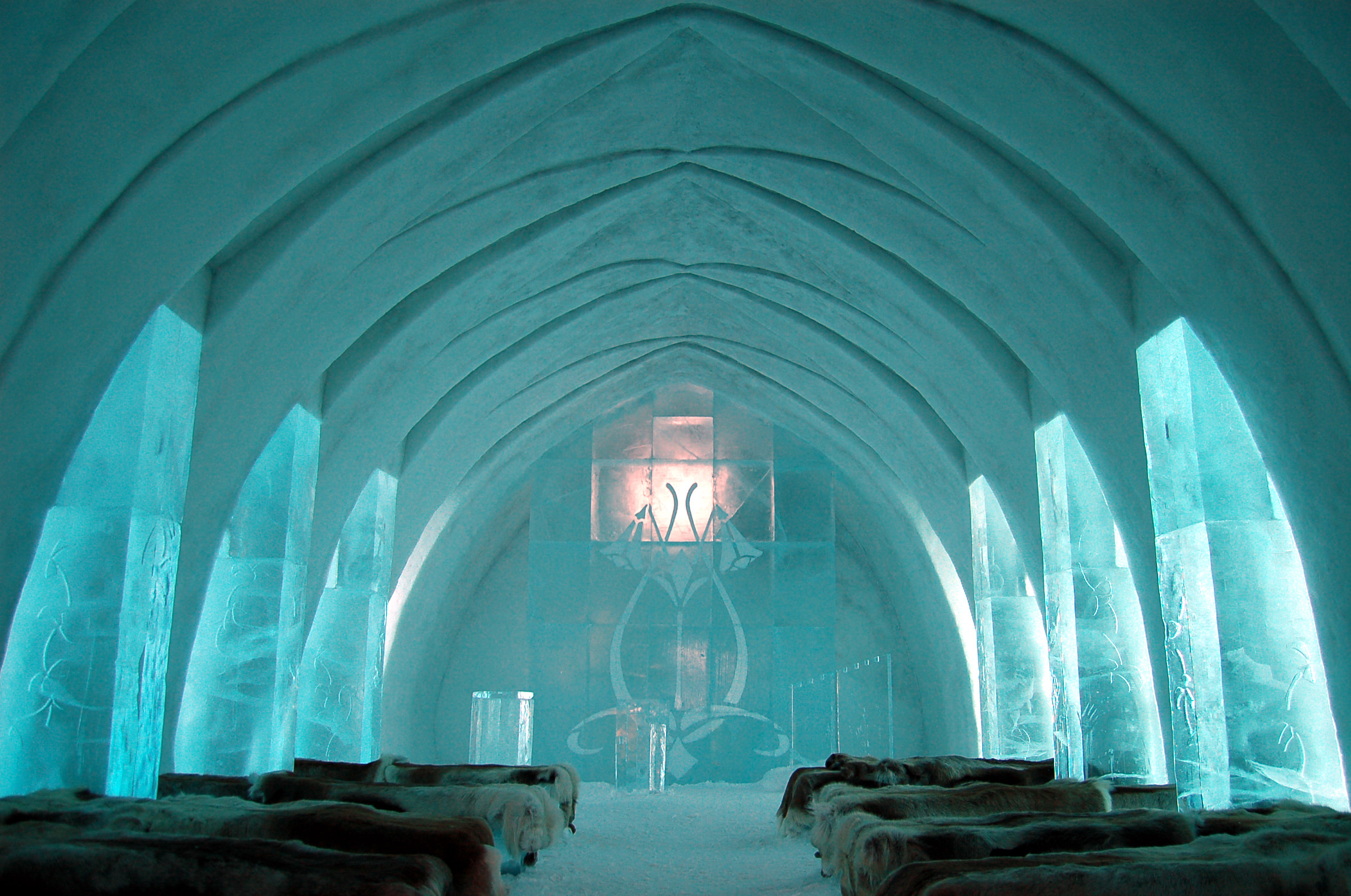
Ice Hotel church

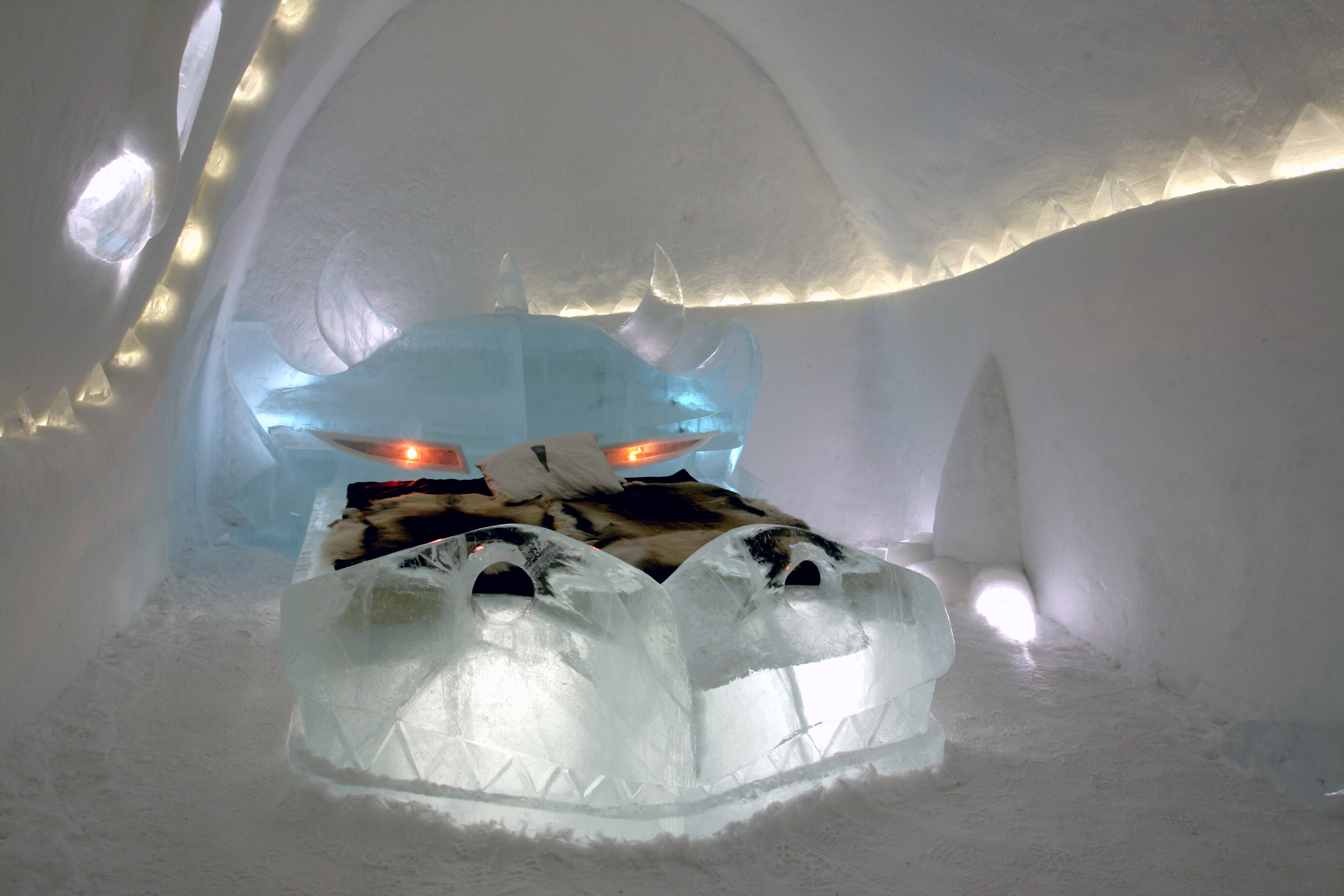
The suite "The Banished Dragon" 2008 by Valli Schafer & Barra Cassidy

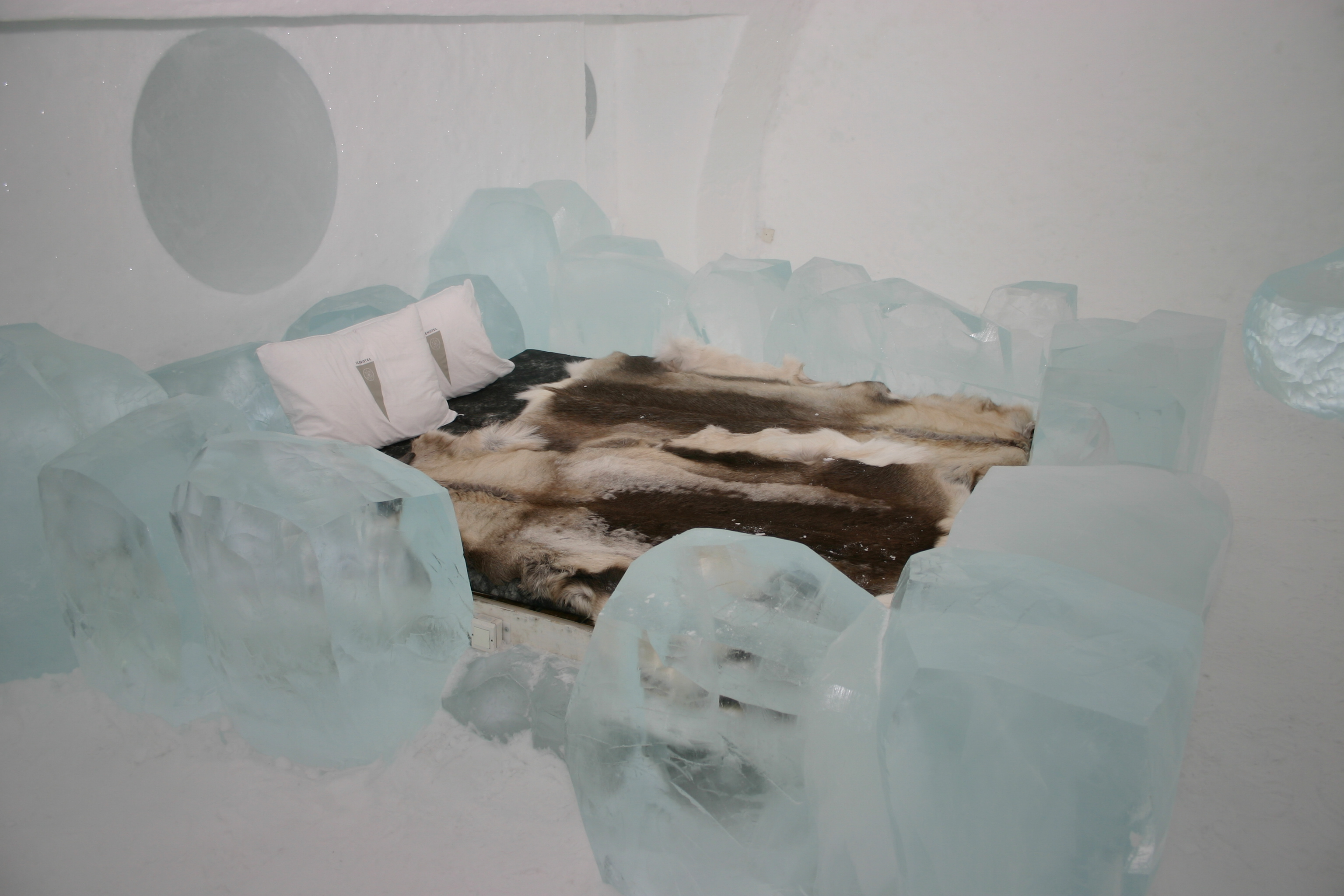
Icerock room

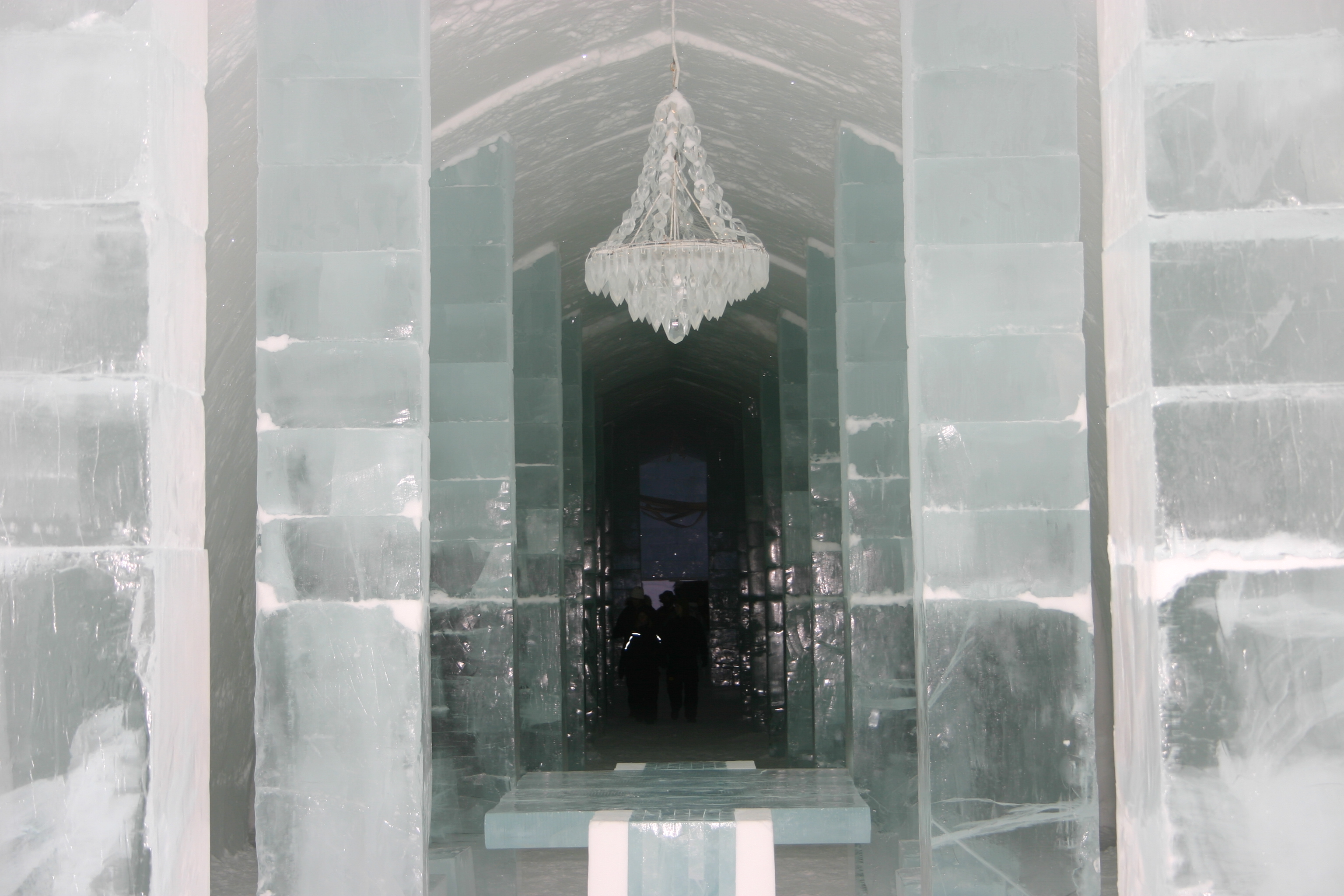
The passageway

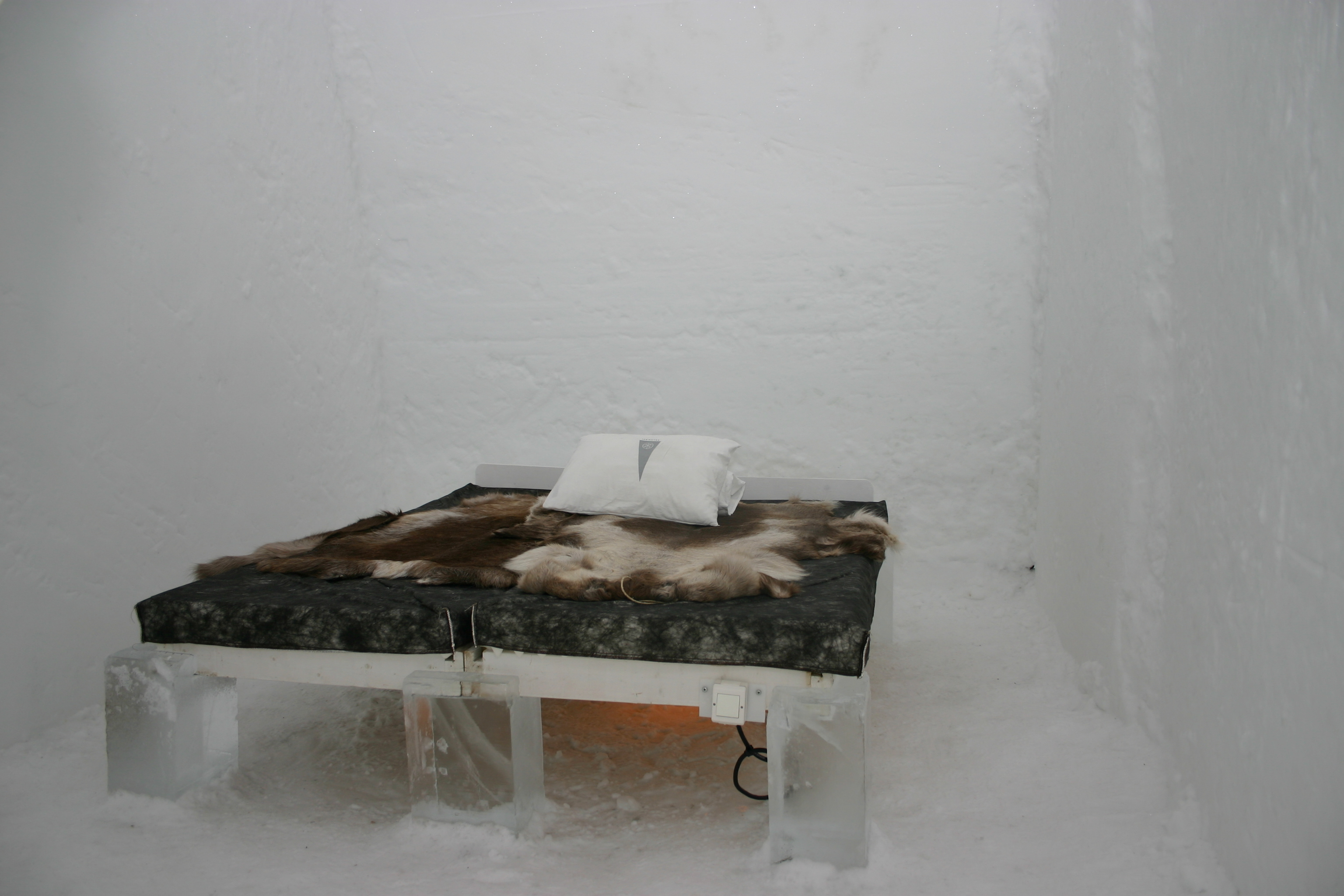
Room for electric blanket

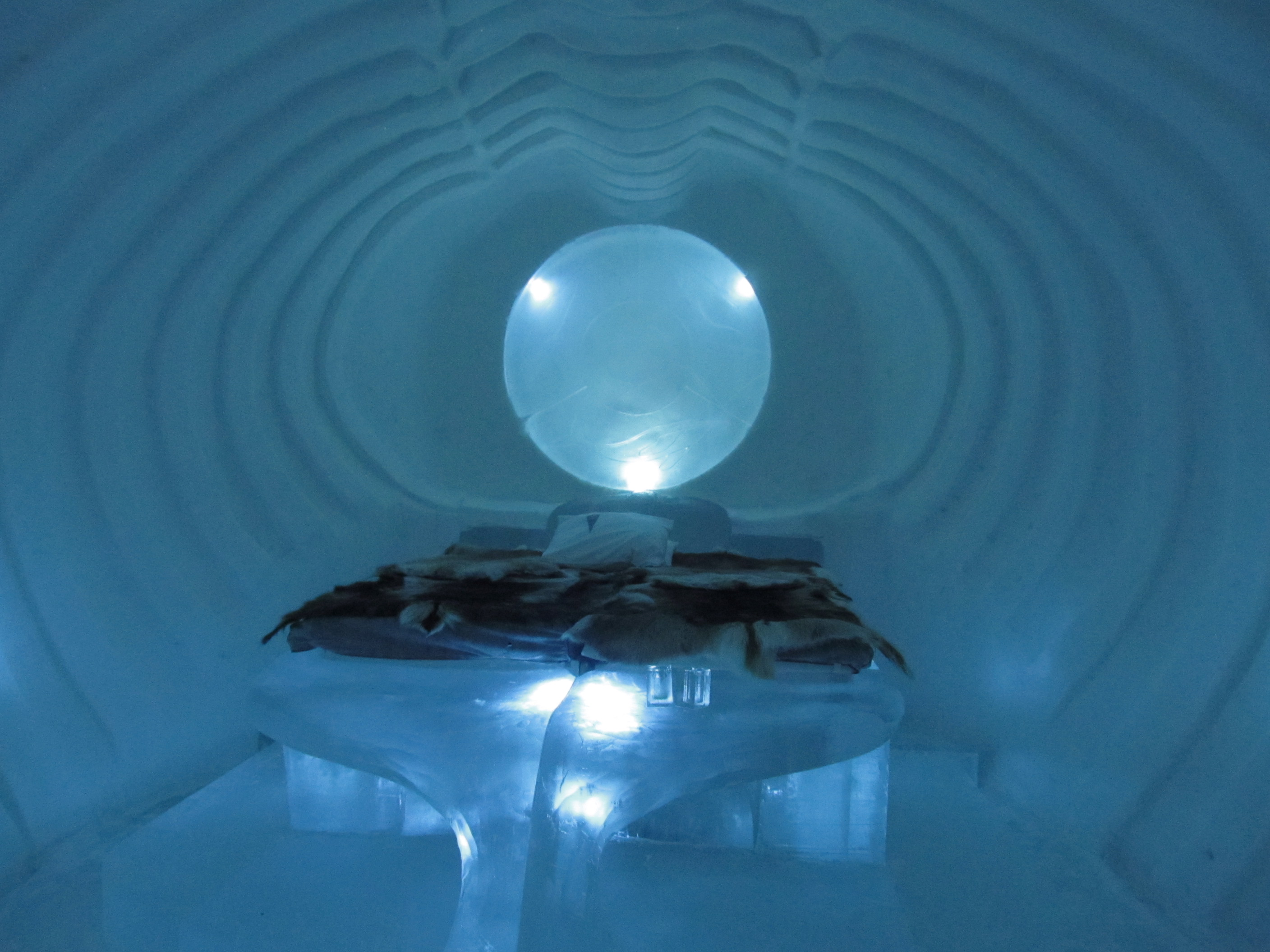
The suite "Blue Marine" 2012 by Andrew Winch & William Blomstrand

== Icebars ==
Icehotel AB searched for business partners during the early and mid-1990s, and the founder, Yngve Bergqvist, chose Absolut Vodka as the first sponsor. The first Absolut Icebar opened in the Icehotel in 1994, and today, the concept is used in three cities: London, Stockholm and Jukkasjärvi.

Several high-profile events around the Icehotel have since been initiated by Absolut Vodka. In 1994, the extension was an advertising shoot for Absolut Vodka to Jukkasjärvi, with photographer Herb Ritts. Models Kate Moss, Naomi Campbell, Mark Findlay and Marcus Schenkenberg were photographed surrounded by ice, wearing creations designed by fashion designer Gianni Versace.

Guests are served vodka in glasses made of ice from the Torne River, often described as a drink "in the rocks". Ice glasses at the bars are brought from the production hall in Jukkasjärvi to the Icehotel. This is also the case with the interior creations, because every six months they are replaced on-site by staff from the ice production and artists. This is done to ensure quality and safety.

Icebar by Icehotel became a franchise concept for ice bars. The concept was launched in spring 2009, with the opening of the Ice Bar CPH by Icehotel in Copenhagen, Denmark. The bar was followed in June of that year by the Ice Bar Tokyo by Icehotel in Tokyo, Japan, and shortly after, the Icebar Oslo by Icehotel in Oslo, Norway.

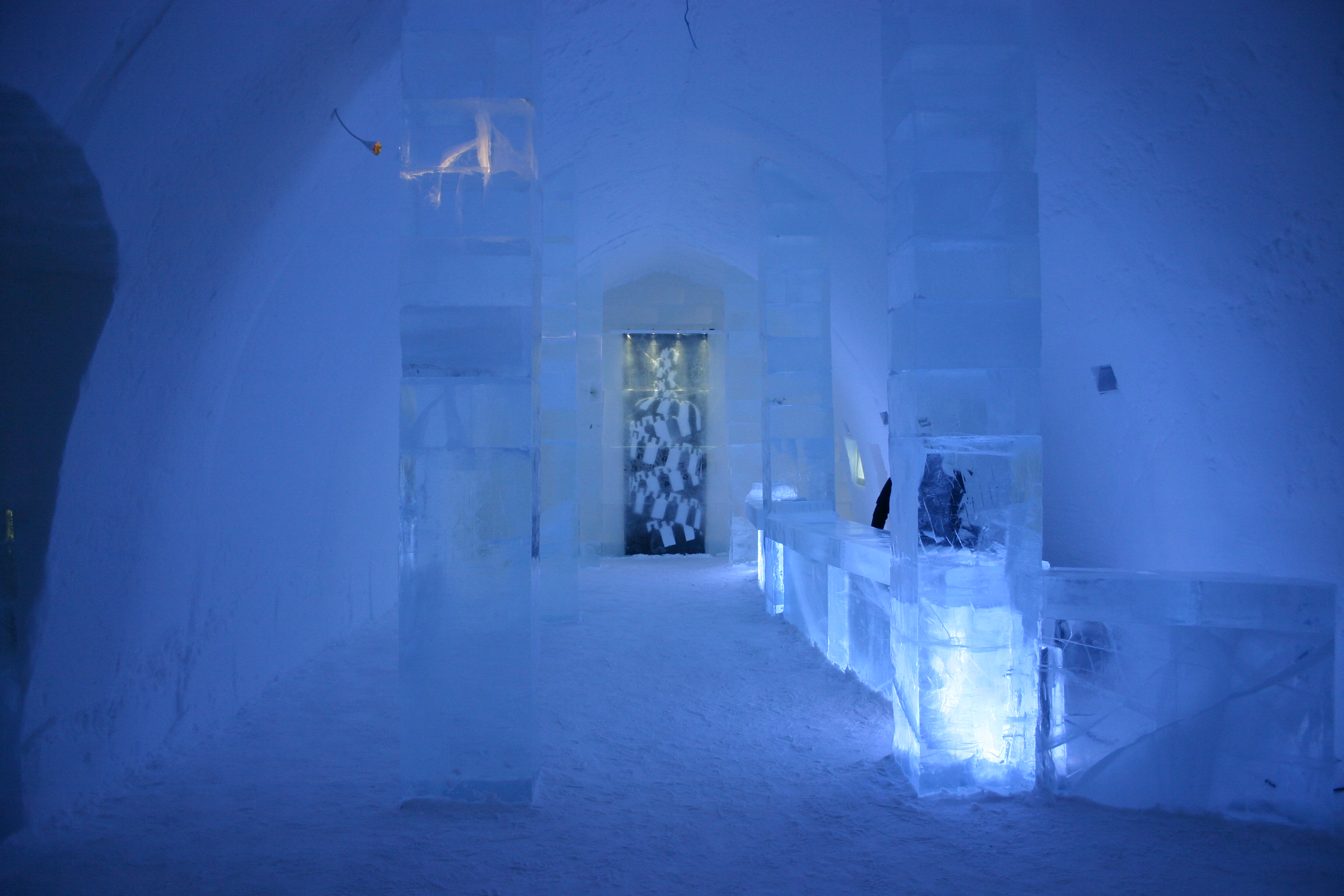
Absolut Icebar in Jukkasjärvi, Sweden (December, 2005)

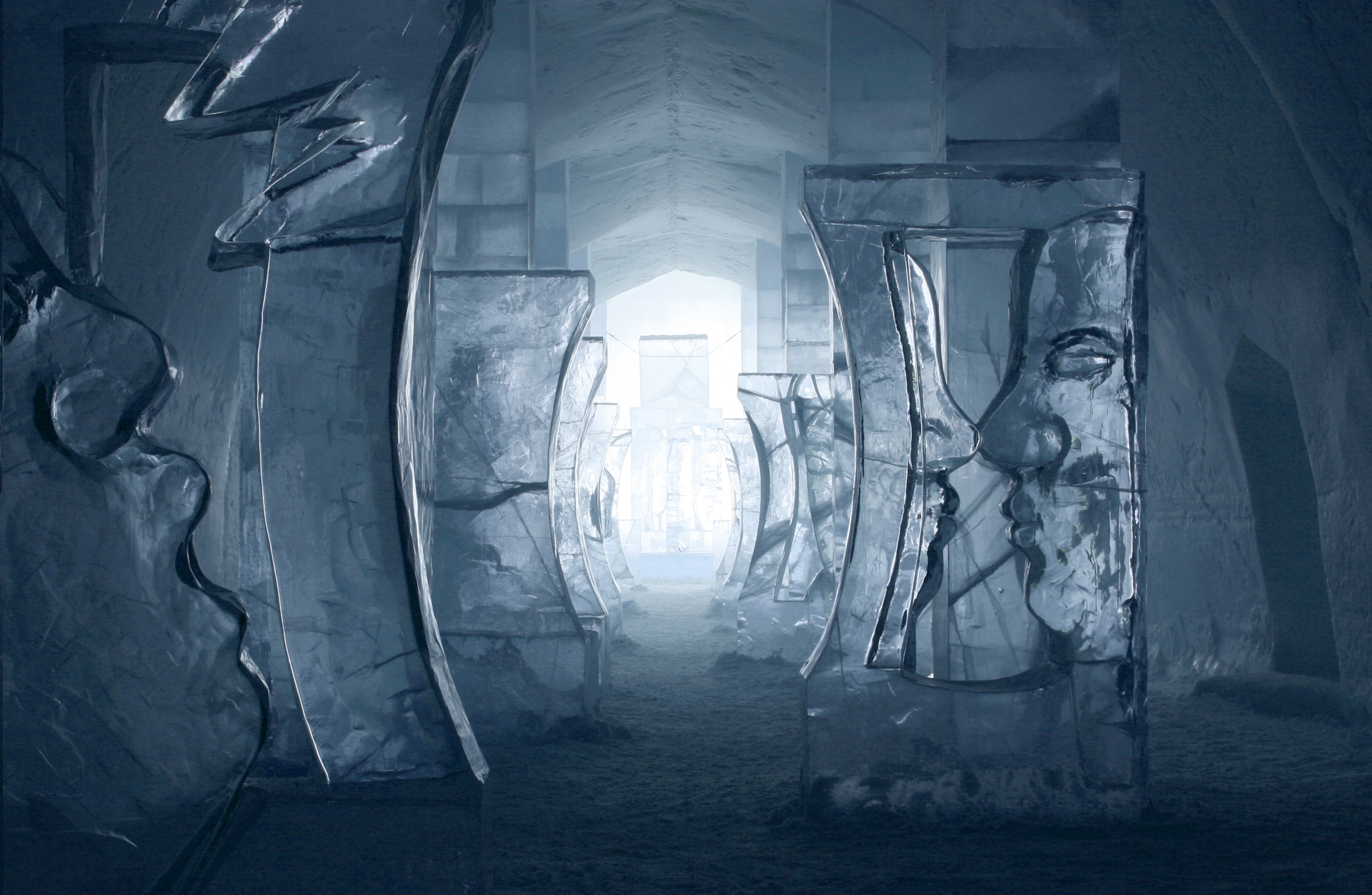
Main Hall 2008. Sculptures by Lena Kriström

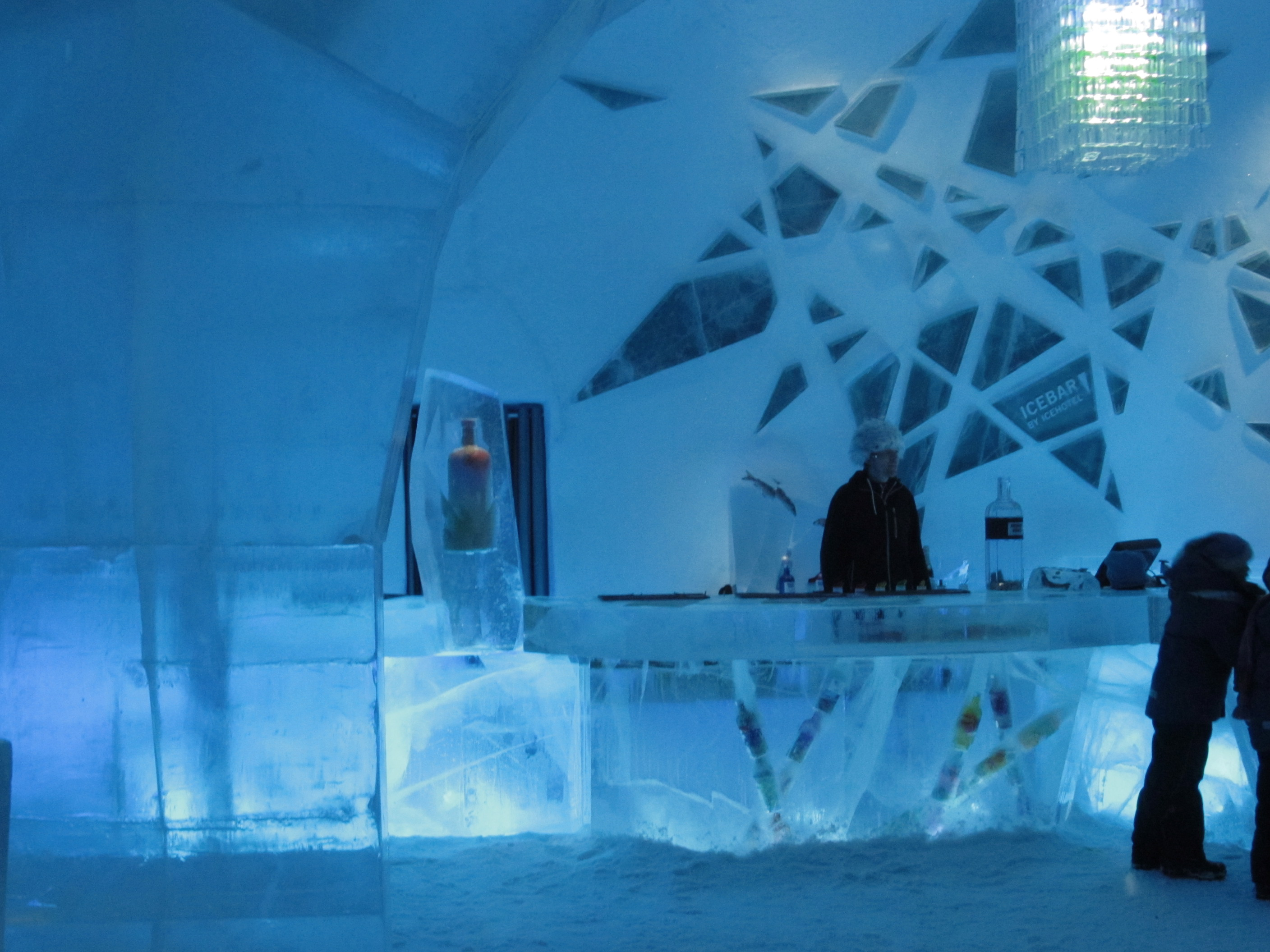
Absolut Icebar in Jukkasjärvi, Sweden (December, 2012)

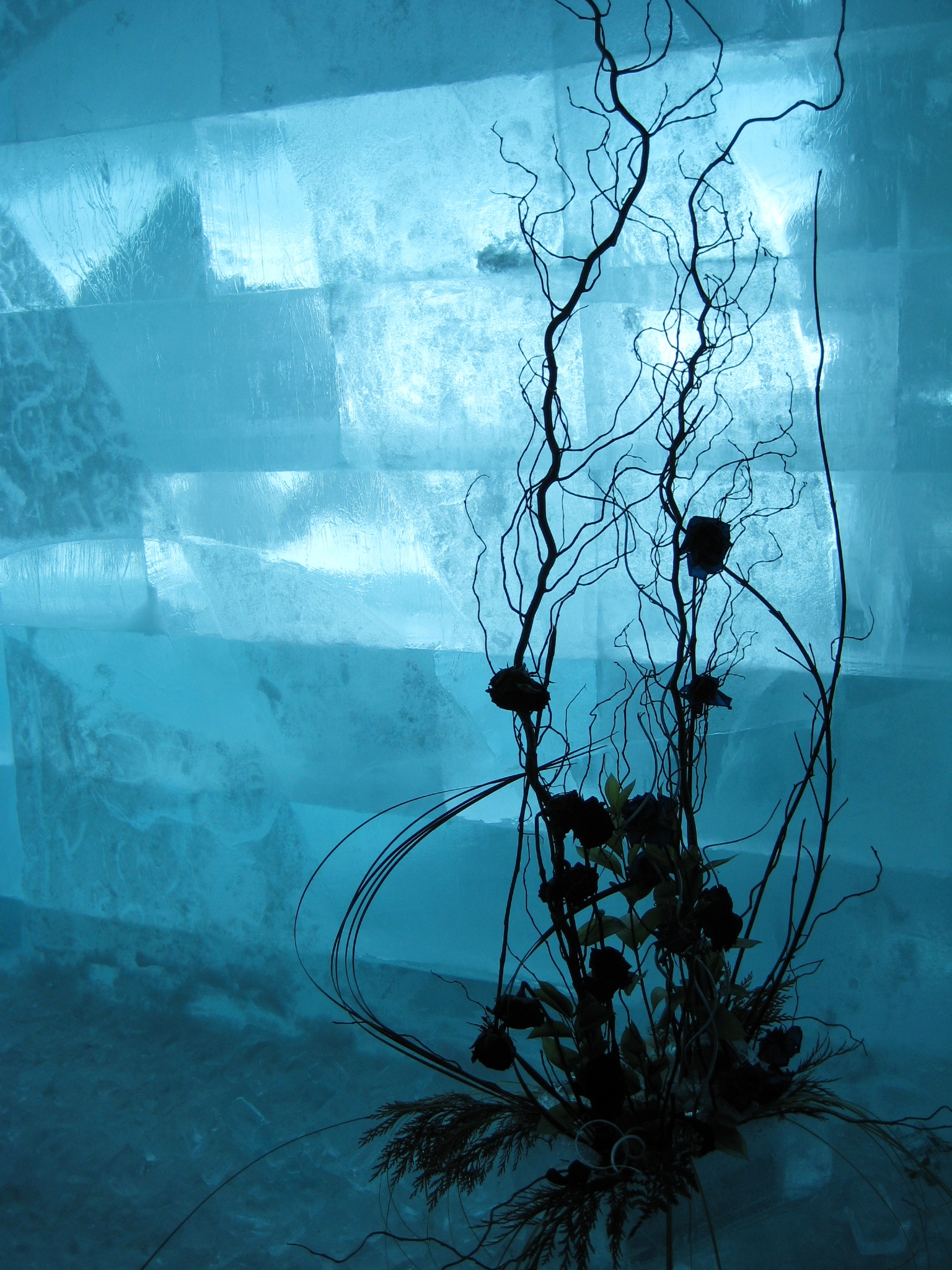
Decoration with dry flowers

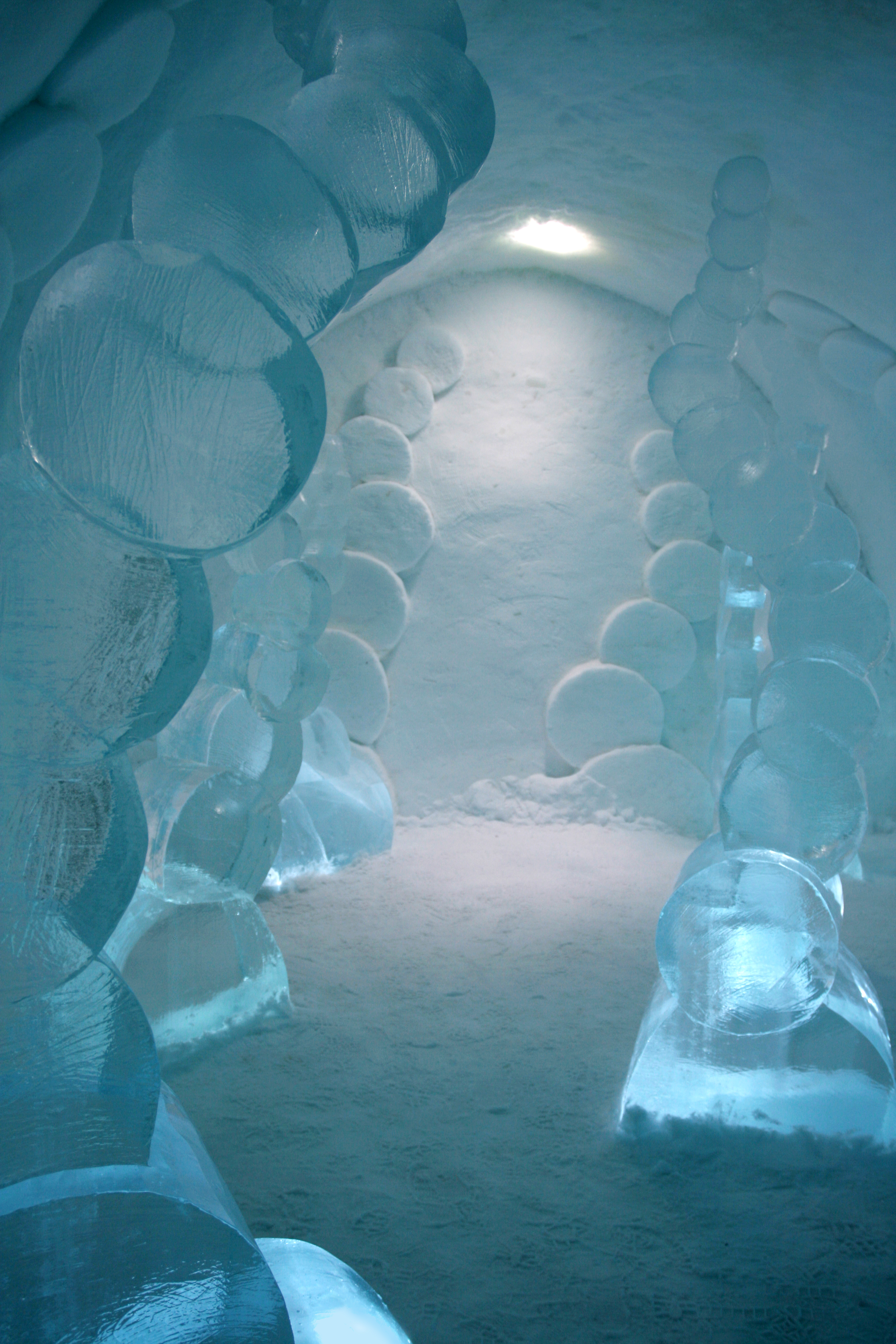
The suite "Coming out" 2008 by Maurizio Perron

== Life cycle ==
Each year the Icehotel receives applications from artists around the world to design the suites. When the temperature drops to levels required for snow gun operations, usually in mid-November, the building process begins. The snow is sprayed on huge inverted catenary shaped steel forms and allowed to freeze. After a couple of days, the forms are removed, leaving a maze of free-standing corridors of snow. In the corridors, dividing walls are built in order to create rooms and suites. Ice blocks are then transported into the hotel, where selected artists start creating the art and design of the perishable material. The Icehotel in Jukkasjärvi opens in phases. The first phase opens in the beginning of December. For each week, another section of the hotel opens up for visitors and guests until the beginning of January.

== Icehotel in the media ==
- In 1998, the hotel was the filming location of the music video for Van Halen's song Without You.
- In 2008, the hotel was featured in a documentary which was broadcast by Discovery Channel and National Geographic.
- In 2010, the hotel was visited in The Amazing Race 17 where one team has to sit on ice chairs for 10 minutes.
- In 2013, the hotel appeared in a short sketch for the Eurovision Song Contest, hosted in Sweden that year.
- In 2014, the hotel main hall, created by artists Alessandro Falca and AnnaSofia Mååg, served as scenography for the Opera by Anton Tjechov (1860-1904) titled "Björnen/The Bear"
- In 2019, the hotel celebrated its 30th anniversary
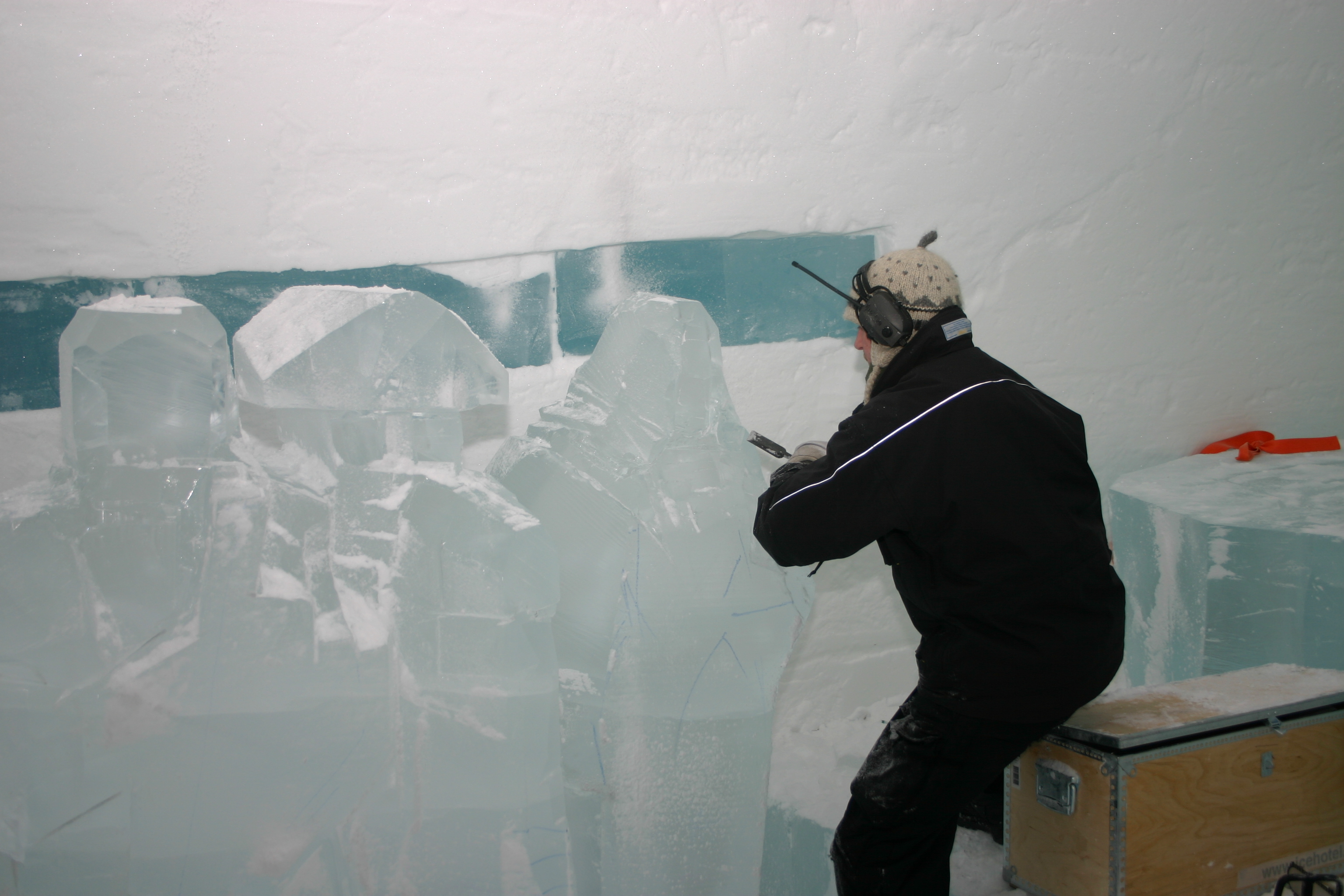
Sculpting the ice

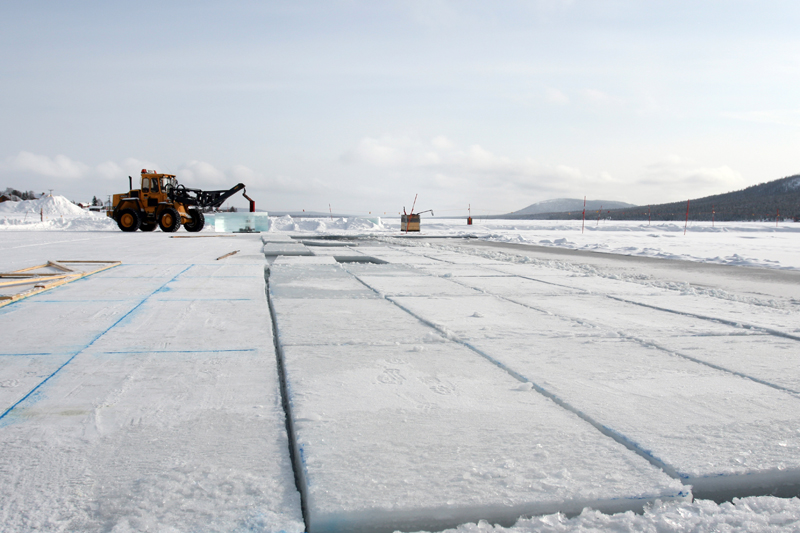
Torne river ice harvest

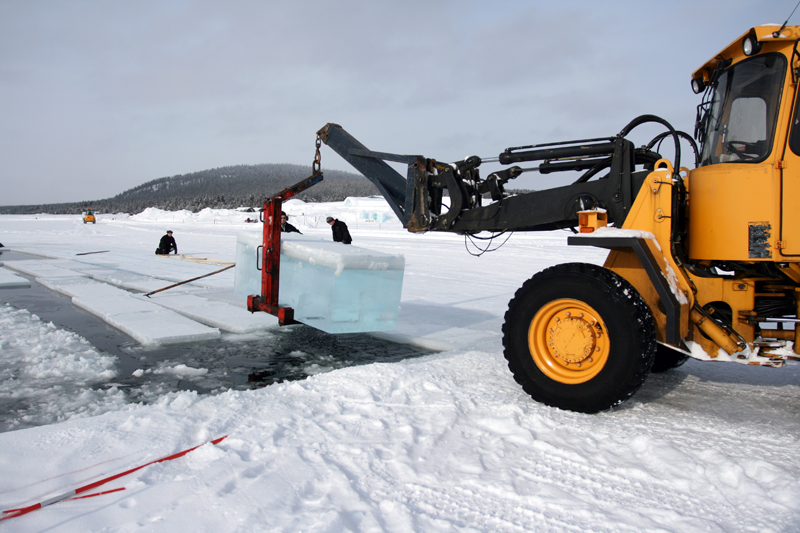
Torne river ice harvest

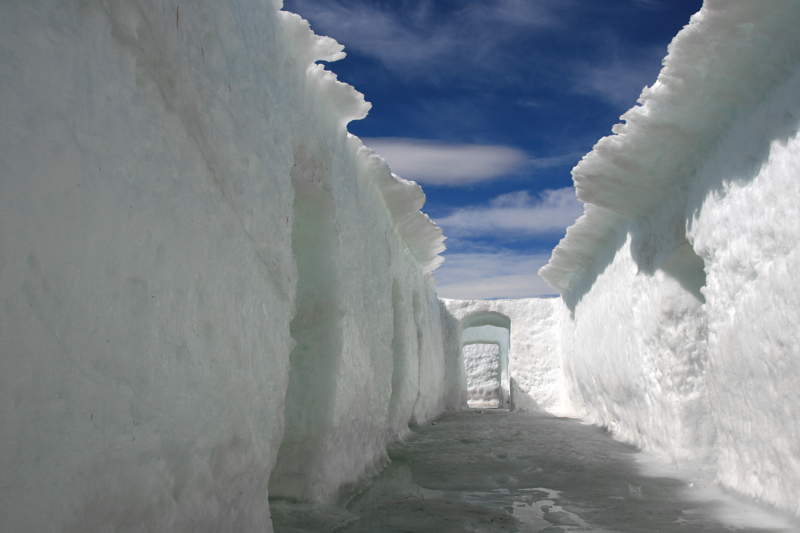
The Icehotel melting in the sun
