= Not Enough (Van Halen song) =

Single by Van Halen

from the album Balance
- B-side: "Amsterdam"; "Right Now (live)" (Japan only); "Dreams (live)" (Japan only)
- Released: June 25, 1995
- Recorded: 1994
- Genre: Soft rock
- Length: 5:13
- Label: Warner Bros.
- Songwriters: Sammy Hagar; Eddie Van Halen; Alex Van Halen; Michael Anthony
- Producer: Bruce Fairbairn

Van Halen singles chronology
"Can't Stop Lovin' You" (1995)	"Not Enough" (1995)	"Amsterdam" (1995)

"Not Enough" is a song by the American rock band Van Halen. It was released as the third single from the band's tenth studio album, Balance, and was written by Sammy Hagar, Eddie Van Halen, Michael Anthony, and Alex Van Halen.

Unlike most Van Halen songs, which are mostly hard rock and heavy metal, "Not Enough" is a ballad in the genre of soft rock. And like Van Halen's cover of "You Really Got Me", "Not Enough" is preceded by an avant-garde instrumental called "Strung Out", which was considered an experiment.

"Not Enough" peaked at No. 97 on the Billboard Hot 100, No. 27 on the Mainstream Rock chart, and No. 6 on the RPM Top Singles chart, eventually becoming No. 39 on the year-end chart of RPM.

== Background ==
"Not Enough" is written around a Ben Folds-esque piano part, and it was the first Van Halen song featuring Michael Anthony playing a fretless bass.

Eddie Van Halen reportedly recorded the instrumental "Strung Out" in the early 80s, having rented composer Marvin Hamlisch's beach house for a summer vacation. Eddie explained that he used to mess around with an old piano and experimented with the instrument by placing various objects inside it, including ping-pong balls, D-cell batteries, knives, and forks. He played the instrument by touching and plucking the strings with his fingers. He created harmonics by pressing a key and then lightly muting the string to bring out different tones, a technique similar to that used on a guitar.

The producer Bruce Fairbairn loved "Strung Out" and selected it as the intro for "Not Enough" and for inclusion on Balance from the numerous tapes of these experiments that Eddie owned.

== Music video ==
A music video directed by Jeth Weinrich for the song features the band performing on the roof of a building.

== Personnel ==
=== Van Halen ===
- Sammy Hagar – lead and backing vocals
- Eddie Van Halen – guitars, keyboards, backing vocals
- Michael Anthony – bass guitar, backing vocals
- Alex Van Halen – drums

=== Guests ===
- Steve Lukather – backing vocals

== Charts ==
=== Weekly charts ===
Chart (1995)	Peak position
Canada Top Singles (RPM)	6
US Billboard Hot 100	97
US Mainstream Rock (Billboard)	27
US CHR/Pop Airplay (Radio & Records)	40

=== Year-end charts ===
Chart (1995)	Position
Canada Top Singles (RPM)	39
