= Me Wise Magic =

1996 song performed by Van Halen

Single by Van Halen

from the album Best Of – Volume I
- Released: November 11, 1996 (Japan)
- Recorded: July–August 1996
- Studio: 5150 Studios, Studio City, California
- Genre: Heavy metal, hard rock, psychedelic rock
- Length: 6:09
- Label: Warner Bros.
- Songwriters: Eddie Van Halen, Michael Anthony, David Lee Roth, Alex Van Halen
- Producer: Glen Ballard

Van Halen singles chronology
"Humans Being" (1996)	"Me Wise Magic" (1996)	"Can't Get This Stuff No More" (1997)

"Me Wise Magic" is a song by Van Halen that appears on the rock band's 1996 compilation album Best Of – Volume I and became the band's 13th No. 1 Billboard Mainstream Rock Track, maintaining the No. 1 position for 6 weeks during the autumn of 1996. It was the first of two highly anticipated tracks recorded by the band with its original lead vocalist and songwriter, David Lee Roth. Together with the other new song on the compilation album, "Can't Get This Stuff No More", it is one of the last songs recorded by the original line-up, consisting of Roth, Michael Anthony , and the Van Halen brothers.

== Composition ==
After Warner Bros. Records notified David Lee Roth that a Van Halen greatest hits album was coming, Roth contacted Eddie Van Halen asking for more details. The singer and the guitarist got in touch again, and two weeks later Eddie, realizing "Humans Being" was the only relatively new track on the compilation, asked Roth if he would record two new songs. Eddie first wrote a song for Roth "that he didn't particularly care for". Eventually when checking all the new songs along with Eddie and producer Glen Ballard, Roth narrowed down to a shuffle, "Can't Get This Stuff No More", and a pop song, "Me Wise Magic". Roth was at first bothered by the darker introduction, but eventually came to like the song. Eddie's nickname for the demo was "The Three Faces of Shamus", for its three sections with "completely different vibes going on".

Roth discarded Ballard's sketch lyrics and wrote his own, and denied the suggestion to get help from songwriter Desmond Child. In June 1996, Roth arrived at 5150 Studios with Eddie without the guitarist having warned band members Michael Anthony and Alex Van Halen about the singer's return. Eddie Van Halen's guitar playing on the song features a whammy bar that raises and lowers chords while still keeping them in tune. This effect was achieved by recording with a modified Peavey Wolfgang signature model, featuring a TransTrem tremolo system.

The lyrics to "Me Wise Magic", written by David Lee Roth, were based on an initial set of lyrics by the song's producer Glen Ballard, which Roth insisted on rewriting to suit his own unique style. Written in first-person, "Me Wise Magic" presents a series of questions and statements about self-awareness, religious belief and superstitions – alternating between the points of view of God and a human being.

== Release ==
A promo CD of "Me Wise Magic" was distributed to radio stations prior to the release of Van Halen's Best of Volume I. Its artwork features a stylized image of Buddha, reflecting the song's lyrics (specifically the lyric, "a Buddhist riff for your inner ear.") "Me Wise Magic" became an instant rock radio hit - Van Halen's third #1 with Roth on the US Rock Chart - and twelfth of a record-setting 14 Rock Chart #1s during the 1980s and 1990s. Reviews were also positive. A commercial CD-single was released in Japan, Australia and Germany.

The return of Roth to Van Halen made media headlines, with MTV going as far as to play a celebratory "welcome back" commercial for the charismatic Roth. Weeks after an appearance at the 1996 MTV Video Music Awards caused a public and media sensation, Van Halen parted ways - for a second time, acrimoniously - with Roth.

A planned video for "Me Wise Magic" was never filmed. The first proposal, of a concept video with a Voodoo theme, was discarded by Roth, who also rejected a performance video where he would be in a big screen behind the three other members. However, in lieu of a video, MTV created a montage of Van Halen and Roth clips set to the song, which they ran with a Van Halen TV special.
