= Don't Tell Me (What Love Can Do) =

1995 single by Van Halen

Single by Van Halen

from the album Balance
- B-side: "Baluchitherium"
- Released: January 9, 1995
- Length: 5:56 (album version); 3:52 (single version)
- Label: Warner Bros.
- Songwriters: Eddie Van Halen; Michael Anthony; Alex Van Halen; Sammy Hagar
- Producer: Bruce Fairbairn

Van Halen singles chronology
"Dreams" (1993)	"Don't Tell Me (What Love Can Do)" (1995)	"Can't Stop Lovin' You" (1995)

Music video
- "Don't Tell Me (What Love Can Do)" on YouTube

"Don't Tell Me (What Love Can Do)" is a song by American hard rock band Van Halen from their 1995 album Balance. It was one of four singles issued for the album and was the only one to reach number one on the US Billboard Album Rock Tracks chart, where it stayed for three weeks.

== Theme and references ==
When I heard that Kurt Cobain had taken his own life, the first thing I thought of was I wish I were there and could have tried to save him. The original title for these lyrics were "I want to show you what love can do," but because it was such a dark horrible thing I just couldn’t shine a light on it. So I changed the final line to "Don't tell me what love can do."

P.S. It was also the time of the breaking up of Van Halen, our last album and tour so it added a lot of emotion, negativity and pain in the original vocal performance which surfaced the second I started singing this song for the first time since 1995.

— Sammy Hagar

The song's main theme is about the power of universal love. Sammy Hagar says in his autobiography that he wanted the song to be uplifting, for the chorus to be 'I wanna show you what love can do', but that his relationship with the Van Halen brothers was becoming strained and that they were very critical of the lyrical treatment, wanting something with more attitude.

In addition, the song also references the death of Nirvana frontman, Kurt Cobain, through the lyrics "Is it right to take the easy way" and ends with "I can't tell you what's right for you" with the bridge, repeated towards the end of the song, saying "I see the damage done, yeah/oh Lord, I heard the shotgun".

== Reception ==
Billboard praised “Don’t Tell Me What Love Can Do” as a sharp, hard-rocking single from Balance, highlighting Eddie Van Halen’s signature guitar style, Bruce Fairbairn’s polished production, and a catchy hook that helped drive strong radio play, noting it could become one of the band’s biggest pop successes in years.

== Music video ==
The song's music video tells of the young husband from the video of "Can't Stop Lovin' You" during his prison sentence. The scenes show him and his friend doing a store robbery, along with his arrest, sentence to prison, his time there, activities and his brawl with an Asian inmate which ends with a brutal wrestle by the prison authorities and inmates who are close friends of the Asian inmate. The young man is then comforted by a man who visits him and the last scene of the video shows that he's due to be released. Interspersed are victims who, along with neon signs, display the attacks they survived such as that of gunshot, drive-by shooting, sexual assault, knifing, and more while the band is shown playing the song.

== Charts ==
Chart (1995)	Peak position
Canada Top Singles (RPM)	36
Europe (Eurochart Hot 100)	60
Finland (Suomen virallinen lista)	5
Netherlands (Dutch Top 40)	34
Netherlands (Single Top 100)	31
Scottish Singles Sales (Official Charts)	22
UK Singles (Official Charts)	27
UK Rock & Metal (Official Charts)	1
US Mainstream Rock (Billboard)	1
