= Without You (Van Halen song) =

1998 single by Van Halen

Single by Van Halen

from the album Van Halen III
- B-side: "Ballot or the Bullet"
- Released: March 25, 1998
- Recorded: 1997
- Studio: 5150 Studios, Studio City, California
- Genre: Hard rock
- Length: 6:28 (album version); 5:14 (single edit)
- Label: Warner Bros.
- Songwriters: Eddie Van Halen, Michael Anthony, Gary Cherone, Alex Van Halen
- Producers: Mike Post and Eddie Van Halen

Van Halen singles chronology
| "Can't Get This Stuff No More" (1997) | "Without You" (1998) | "Fire in the Hole" (1998) |

"Without You" is a rock song written by the group Van Halen for their 1998 album Van Halen III. It was the first of three singles from the album, as well as the first to feature Gary Cherone on vocals. The track debuted at number one on the Billboard Mainstream Rock Tracks chart, the second in the magazine's history to do so (after Rush's "Stick It Out" in 1993). It is the band's last single to reach the peak position.

The "Without You" music video cost over $1,000,000 to make. The band footage for the music video was shot in Los Angeles, California, on January 28–29, 1998. The remaining footage was shot inside the Icehotel in Sweden, with model Morag Dickson. The video premiered on MTV on March 2, 1998.

== Track listing ==
CD single track listing
| No. | Title | Length |
|---|---|---|
| 1. | "Without You" (radio edit) | 4:57 |
| 2. | "Without You" (album version) | 6:28 |
| 3. | "Ballot or the Bullet" (album version) | 5:37 |

== Charts ==
Chart performance for "Without You."
| Chart (1998) | Peak position |
|---|---|
| Australia (ARIA) | 56 |
| Canada Top Singles (RPM) | 55 |
| Canada Rock/Alternative (RPM) | 8 |
| US Mainstream Rock (Billboard) | 1 |
