= Can't Stop Lovin' You =

1995 single by Van Halen

Single by Van Halen

from the album Balance
- B-side: "Crossing Over"
- Released: March 10, 1995
- Length: 4:07
- Label: Warner Bros.
- Songwriters: Eddie Van Halen, Michael Anthony, Sammy Hagar, Alex Van Halen
- Producer: Bruce Fairbairn

Van Halen singles chronology
"Don't Tell Me (What Love Can Do)" (1995)	"Can't Stop Lovin' You" (1995)	"Not Enough" (1995)

Music videos
- "Can't Stop Lovin' You" on YouTube

"Can't Stop Lovin' You" is a song by American band Van Halen. It was released in March 1995 as the second single from their 10th album, Balance (1995). The song emerged after producer Bruce Fairbairn asked for a more pop-oriented song. Instead of searching for his archives, Eddie Van Halen decided to write new music from scratch. The song was written by all members of Van Halen and pays homage to Ray Charles' song "I Can't Stop Loving You", particularly in the line where Sammy Hagar sings "Hey Ray, what you said is true..."

The song was Van Halen's most successful single from Balance in the United States, being the only single that reached the top 40 of the Billboard Hot 100, peaking at number 30. This would be Van Halen's last song to reach the top 40 in the United States. The single also reached number three on the Canadian RPM 100 Hit Tracks chart and number 33 on the UK Singles Chart.

== Music video ==
The video, directed by Peter Christopherson, is set in an average middle class American home, where it goes back and forth between the band performing the song and people showing their affection for one another, from an old couple celebrating their anniversary, to a teen couple, to a boy and his dog, to a woman and her pet monkey. There is also a moving moment in the video in which a girl mourns the loss of her dog.

At the beginning of the video, it shows a man taking a gun, and his wife is worried. In the end, the video shows his wife and his son waiting for him as he leaves the prison. What he did and his time in prison are shown in the video of the song "Don't Tell Me (What Love Can Do)". An edited version of the video replaces some shots of prison with shots of the band members.

== Legacy ==
The song was performed considerably on the 1995 Ambulance Tour with Sammy Hagar. It was featured on both Van Halen compilations Best Of – Volume I and The Best of Both Worlds.

== Track listings ==
US CD and 7-inch single

1. "Can't Stop Lovin' You" (album version) – 4:08
2. "Crossing Over" – 5:04

UK, European, and Australian maxi-CD single

1. "Can't Stop Lovin' You" – 4:07
2. "Crossing Over" – 5:03
3. "Right Now" (live) – 6:08
4. "Man on a Mission" (live) – 4:58

Japanese CD single

1. "Can't Stop Lovin' You"
2. "Big Fat Money"
3. "Baluchitherium"

== Charts ==
=== Weekly charts ===
Chart (1995)	Peak position
Canada Top Singles (RPM)	3
Europe (Eurochart Hot 100)	80
Europe (European Hit Radio)	17
Hungary (Mahasz)	9
Iceland (Íslenski Listinn Topp 40)	19
Scottish Singles Sales (Official Charts)	26
UK Singles (Official Charts)	33
UK Rock & Metal (Official Charts)	1
US Billboard Hot 100	30
US Album Rock Tracks (Billboard)	2
US Top 40/Mainstream (Billboard)	11

=== Year-end charts ===
Chart (1995)	Position
Canada Top Singles (RPM)	28
US Billboard Hot 100	100
US Album Rock Tracks (Billboard)	12

== Release history ==
Region	Date	Format(s)	Label(s)	Ref.
Japan	March 10, 1995	CD	Warner Bros.	
United States	March 14, 1995	7-inch vinyl; CD; cassette	Warner Bros.	
United Kingdom	March 20, 1995	CD; cassette	Warner Bros.	
Australia	April 24, 1995	CD	Warner Bros.	
