= Twister (soundtrack) =

Soundtracks to the 1996 film Twister

Two soundtracks were released for the 1996 disaster film Twister: an album consisting of rock-music singles, many of which were exclusive releases for the film, and a traditional orchestral film score composed by Mark Mancina. Both albums feature the instrumental theme song "Respect the Wind" composed and performed for the film by Alex and Eddie Van Halen. Twister: Music from the Motion Picture Soundtrack was released on May 7, 1996 through Warner Bros. Records in CD, LP and cassettes, while Twister: Motion Picture Score was released through Atlantic Records three months later, on August 13, 1996. An expanded edition consisting of additional orchestral music which was not included in the first release was issued by La-La Land Records and released on January 17, 2017.

== Soundtrack ==
Twister: Music from the Motion Picture Soundtrack

Soundtrack album by Various artists
- Released: May 7, 1996
- Genres: Hard rock; Alternative rock; Country rock
- Length: 59:20
- Label: Warner Bros.
- Producers: Bruce Fairbairn; Rusted Root; Tori Amos; Viktor Krauss; Mark Knopfler; Soul Asylum; Paul Q. Kolderie; Jeremy Lubbock; Patrick Leonard; Juan Patiño; Lisa Loeb; Rick Rubin; Lou Giordano; Robert John "Mutt" Lange; Lindsey Buckingham; Alex Van Halen; Eddie Van Halen

Singles from Twister: Music from the Motion Picture Soundtrack
- 1. "Darling Pretty" Released: 1996; 2. "Humans Being" Released: April 23, 1996; 3. "No One Needs to Know" Released: May 15, 1996; 4. "Twisted" Released: 1996

=== Track listing ===
No.	Title	Writer(s)	Artist	Length
1.	"Humans Being"	Alex Van Halen; Edward Van Halen; Michael Anthony; Sammy Hagar	Van Halen	5:10
2.	"Virtual Reality"	Michael Glabicki	Rusted Root	3:23
3.	"Talula" (BT's Tornado Mix)	Tori Amos	Tori Amos	3:43
4.	"Moments Like This"	Michael McDonald; Viktor Krauss	Alison Krauss & Union Station	4:58
5.	"Darling Pretty"	Mark Knopfler	Mark Knopfler	4:27
6.	"Miss This"	Dave Pirner	Soul Asylum	3:56
7.	"Broken"	Tanya Donelly	Belly	4:03
8.	"Love Affair"	Alan and Marilyn Bergman; Ennio Morricone	k.d. lang	4:41
9.	"How"	Lisa Loeb	Lisa Loeb & Nine Stories	3:52
10.	"Melancholy Mechanics"	Anthony Kiedis; Chad Smith; Dave Navarro; Flea	Red Hot Chili Peppers	4:31
11.	"Long Way Down" (Remix)	John Rzeznik	Goo Goo Dolls	3:29
12.	"No One Needs to Know"	Shania Twain; Robert John "Mutt" Lange	Shania Twain	3:05
13.	"Twisted"	Stevie Nicks	Stevie Nicks & Lindsey Buckingham	4:13
14.	"Respect the Wind"	A. Van Halen; E. Van Halen	Eddie & Alex Van Halen	5:49
Total length:				59:20

=== Reception ===
Steven McDonald of AllMusic described it as "a diverse assortment, to be sure, with some very enjoyable moments salted amongst the crunchy parts."

=== Charts ===
Chart (1996)	Peak position
Australian Albums (ARIA)	49
Austrian Albums (Ö3 Austria)	37
US Billboard 200	28

=== Certifications ===
Region	Certification	Certified units/sales
United States (RIAA) 1996 soundtrack	Gold	500,000^{^}
^{^} Shipments figures based on certification alone.

== Score ==
Twister: Motion Picture Score

Soundtrack album by Mark Mancina
- Released: August 13, 1996
- Genre: Film score
- Length: 51:01
- Label: Atlantic
- Producer: Mark Mancina

Mark Mancina chronology
Money Train (1995)	Twister (1996)	Moll Flanders (1996)

Twister marked Mancina's second collaboration with Jan de Bont following Speed (1994). Most of the traditional orchestrations were recorded live. He revealed that his initial score had 42 minutes of music, but after being edited he felt that it was not presented the way it intended to be. The opening track had an outtake which was his and Chris Ward's idea, calling it as an "exciting piece of music, and the orchestra was buzzing" that was quieted by conductor Don Harper. The medley of "William Tell Overture / Oklahoma" was composed on de Bont's insistence to combine those two musical pieces in a single epic cue which he found difficult as he had to maintain those tempos, but the vocals changed throughout the process. Most of the orchestrated tracks were in the film but were not in the score album.

=== Track listing ===
All tracks are written by Mark Mancina, except where noted.

No.	Title	Writer(s)	Length
1.	"Oklahoma: Wheatfield"		1:19
2.	"Oklahoma: Where's My Truck?"		0:19
3.	"Oklahoma: Futility"		2:14
4.	"Oklahoma: Downdraft"		1:46
5.	"It's Coming: Drive In"		2:37
6.	"It's Coming: The Big Suck"		1:09
7.	"The Hunt: Going Green" (feat. Trevor Rabin on guitar)		2:48
8.	"The Hunt: Sculptures"		3:03
9.	"The Hunt: Cow"		5:37
10.	"The Hunt: Ditch"		1:27
11.	"The Damage: Wakita"		5:02
12.	"Hailstorm Hill: Bob's Road"		2:09
13.	"Hailstorm Hill: We're Almost There"		2:58
14.	"F5: Dorothy IV"		1:47
15.	"F5: Mobile Home"		4:38
16.	"F5: God's Finger"		1:46
17.	"William Tell Overture / Oklahoma Medley," (featuring Wendle Josepher and Todd Field on vocals)	Gioachino Rossini; Richard Rodgers; Oscar Hammerstein II	1:05
18.	"End Title / Respect the Wind" (feat. Eddie and Alex Van Halen)	Alex Van Halen; Edward Van Halen	9:17
Total length:			51:01

=== Reception ===
Rodney Batdorf of AllMusic "on the surface there's a lot of bluster, noise and style—but if you try to remember anything about the actual music, you'll come up dry". Thomas Glorieux of Maintitles wrote "In truth, this is music that most Remote Control composers can't even write. So buckle up and get ready to be blown away!" Writing for Filmtracks.com, Christian Clemmensen said "While most listeners are likely to remember the score for Twister by the snazzy electric guitars in the rousing chase scenes and the occasional choral majesty, the more subtle orchestral touches are certainly the real attraction in the work. These ominous sounds often resemble snarling creatures when merged with the final sound effects within the film and are a fantastically smart use of music for the advancement of the story." Duane Bryge of The Hollywood Reporter wrote the film is "greatly aided by composer Mark Mancina's soaring, heartland-strained score."

=== Expanded edition ===
Twister: Motion Picture Score (Expanded Archival Collection)

Soundtrack album by Mark Mancina
- Released: January 17, 2017
- Genre: Film score
- Length: 64:07
- Label: La-La Land
- Producer: Mark Mancina

In January 2017, La-La Land Records released a limited-edition, remastered and expanded album containing Mark Mancina's entire score plus four additional tracks.

==== Track listing ====
All tracks are written by Mark Mancina, except where noted.

No.	Title	Writer(s)	Length
1.	"Wheatfield" (Film Version)		1:26
2.	"The Hunt Begins"		3:51
3.	"The Sky"		1:03
4.	"Dorothy IV" (Film Version)		1:56
5.	"The First Twister"		0:49
6.	"In the Ditch / Where's My Truck?"		2:00
7.	"Waterspouts"		2:49
8.	"Cow"		5:42
9.	"Walk in the Woods"		2:05
10.	"Bob's Road"		2:13
11.	"Hail No!" (Film Version)		2:43
12.	"Futility"		2:17
13.	"Drive-in Twister"		2:57
14.	"Wakita" (Film Version)		5:19
15.	"Sculptures" (Film Version)		3:06
16.	"House Visit"		4:47
17.	"The Big Suck" (Film Version)		1:47
18.	"End Title"		2:20
19.	"Wheatfield" (Alternate)		1:33
20.	"Waterspouts" (Alternate)		2:50
21.	"The Big Suck" (Alternate)		1:13
22.	"End Title / Respect the Wind" (feat. Eddie & Alex Van Halen)	Alex Van Halen; Edward Van Halen	9:21
Total length:			64:07
