= AnnaSofia Mååg =

Swedish artist

- Born: 1968 (age 57–58)
- Education: School of Design and Crafts
- Known for: ice sculpture

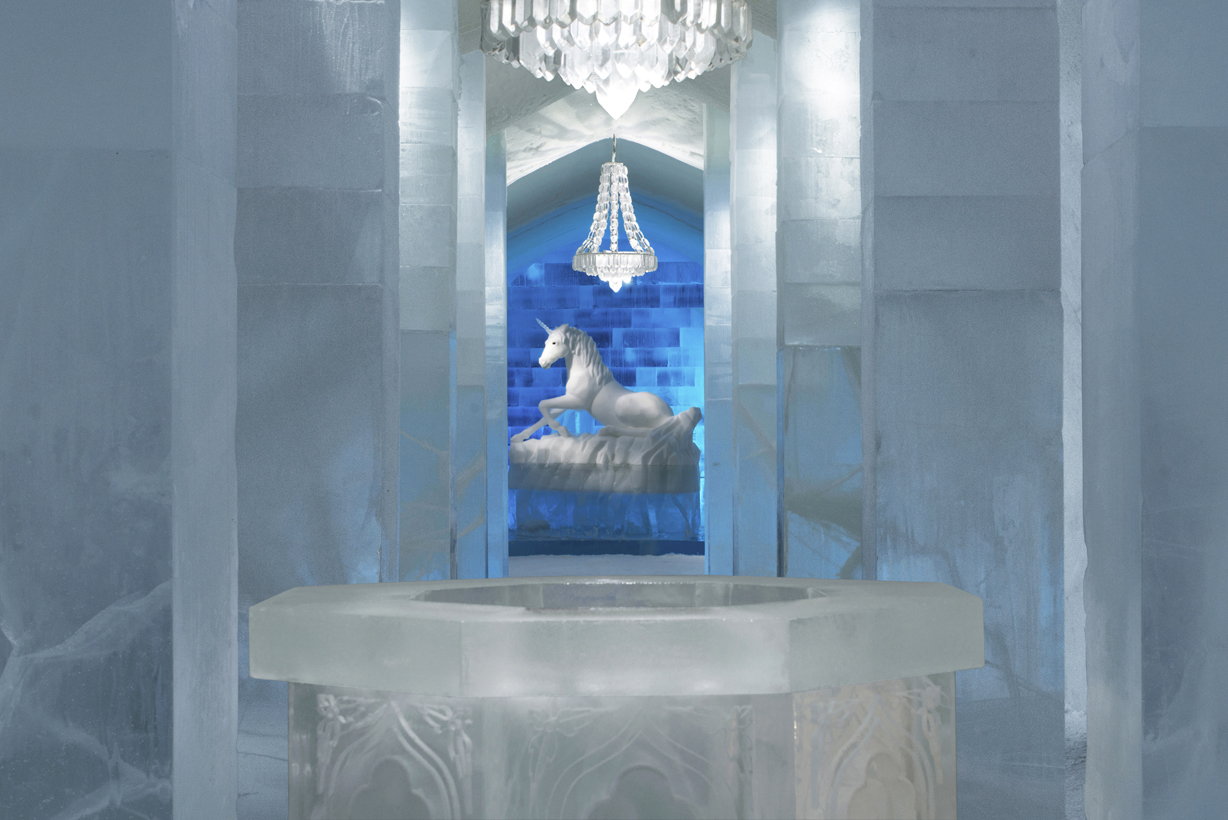
The "Secret Garden" in the main hall of the Icehotel, 2014

AnnaSofia Mååg (born 1968) is a Swedish ice artist, sculptor and ceramicist.

== Life ==
She has a Master of Fine Arts from HDK – School of Design and Crafts of the University of Gothenburg.

She has created works for the Icehotel in Jukkasjärvi since 2006. In 2014 she worked with Alessandro Falca to make a "Secret Garden" in the main hall, including a wishing well and unicorn. In 2015 her "Elephant in the Room" art suite was dominated by a 4 metres (13 ft) high carving of an elephant.

One of her ceramic works, made in 2001, is held by the Swedish Nationalmuseum in Stockholm. She has exhibited sculpture at the Svalöv International Sculpture Symposium.
