= Balance (Van Halen album) =

Studio album by Van Halen
- Released: January 24, 1995
- Recorded: May 25 – September 2, 1994
- Studios: 5150 Studios (Studio City); Little Mountain (Vancouver)
- Genres: Hard rock; pop metal
- Length: 53:18
- Label: Warner Bros.
- Producer: Bruce Fairbairn

Van Halen chronology
| Live: Right Here, Right Now (1993) | Balance (1995) | Van Halen Best of, Volume I (1996) |

Sammy Hagar chronology
| Live: Right Here, Right Now (1993) | Balance (1995) | Marching to Mars (1997) |

Singles from Balance
- 1. "Don't Tell Me (What Love Can Do)" Released: January 9, 1995; 2. "Can't Stop Lovin' You" Released: March 10, 1995; 3. "Not Enough" Released: June 25, 1995 (Japan); 4. "Amsterdam" Released: June 26, 1995 (UK)

Balance is the tenth studio album by American rock band Van Halen, released on January 24, 1995, by Warner Bros. Records. The album is the last of the band's four studio releases to feature Sammy Hagar as the lead singer. It is also the final Van Halen album to feature bassist Michael Anthony in its entirety. Balance reached number 1 on the U.S. Billboard 200 in February 1995 and reached triple platinum status on May 12, 2004, by selling more than three million copies in the US. "The Seventh Seal" was nominated for a Grammy for Best Hard Rock Performance.

Featuring a more serious tone than other Van Halen albums, Balance features a full integration of Eddie Van Halen's guitar riffs and keyboard work and contains three instrumentals. The record received mixed reviews from many music critics.

The album was remastered by Donn Landee and released on October 6, 2023, as part of The Collection II; the four studio albums with Hagar, plus an extra disc of eight rarities from this era.

On August 15, 2025, the album was re-released in an expanded edition featuring live performances from Wembley in 1995.

== Recording and production ==
According to Ian Christe's book, Everybody Wants Some: The Van Halen Saga, Balance was released amid internal fighting between Hagar and the Van Halen brothers. The band worked eight-hour days for three months recording the album. The first song on the record, "The Seventh Seal", features mystical overtones that came, in part, from Eddie Van Halen's newfound sobriety. His therapist, Sat-Kaur Khalsa, urged him to relax and imagine where he was after drinking a six-pack of beer. After smoking cigarettes, drinking beer, and playing guitar for 20 years, he tried writing songs sober and wrote three songs in one half hour period. The album then moves into Hagar's territory with "Can't Stop Lovin' You". The song was taken from his ex-wife's point of view, believing that she was still in love with him. The album reached number one on the Billboard 200, their fourth consecutive number one studio album.

Most of the Balance album was recorded at Eddie's 5150 Studios, located in Studio City, except for five lead vocal tracks that were recorded in Vancouver, where the album's producer Bruce Fairbairn resided. It was mixed by Mike Fraser and mastered at Sterling Sound, New York, by George Marino.

Following the recording of Balance and its subsequent Ambulance Tour (the band renaming the tour as Eddie was having hip issues and brother Alex had to wear a neck brace), Van Halen's second incarnation broke up. Regarding this time period, in 1996 Eddie Van Halen told Guitar World: "There had been a variety of conflicts brewing between manager Ray Danniels, Sammy, and the band since I quit drinking on October 2, 1994... It got so bad that I actually started drinking again."

=== Songs ===
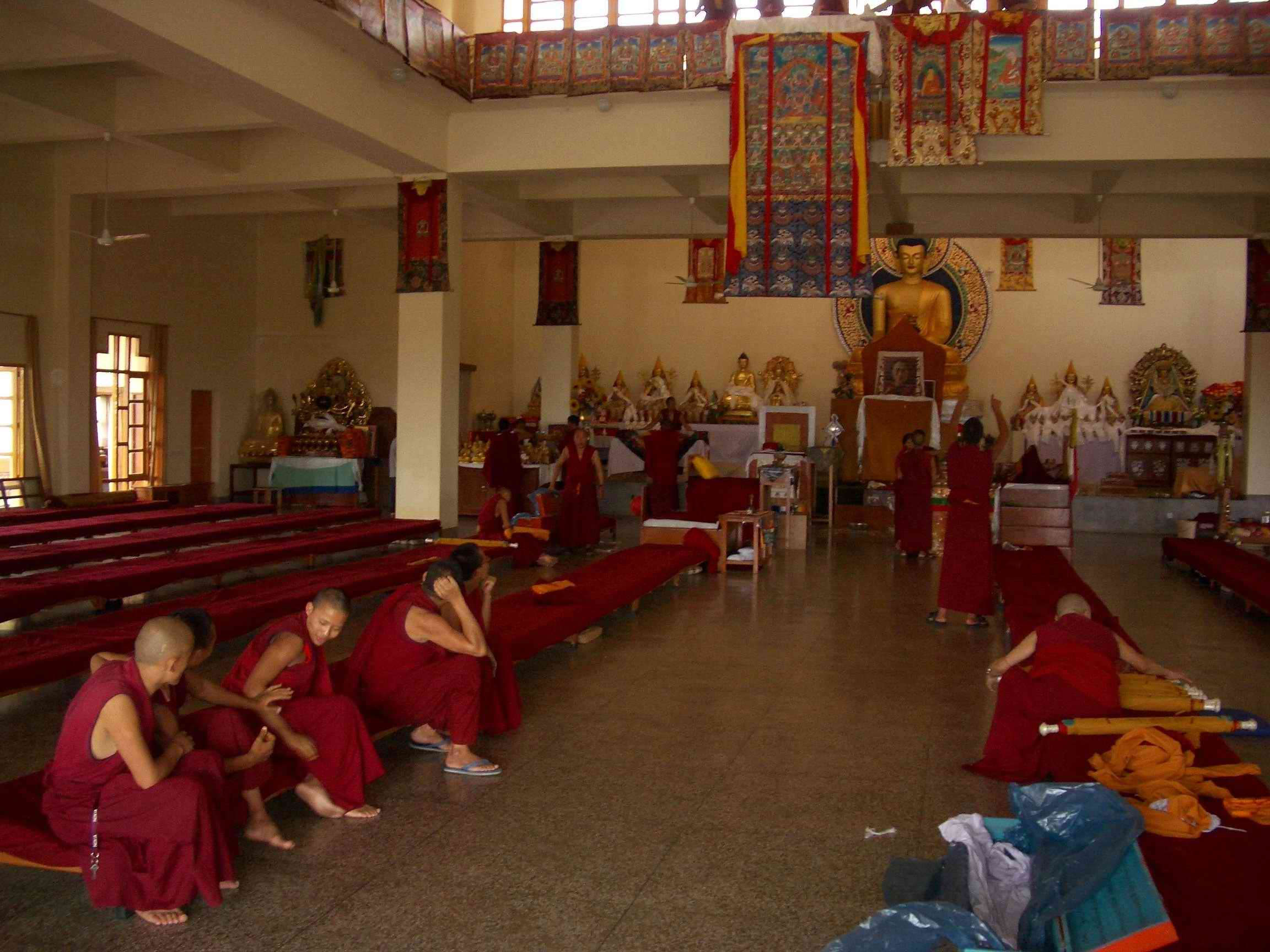
Balance opens with the sound of chanting monks from Gyuto Tantric University (pictured)

Balance has a more serious direction than earlier Van Halen albums; as reviewer Johnny Cigarettes described the direction: "Monks are chanting. Sleevenotes are in medieval script. The cover is Athena's mystical arse. Van Halen have decided to get serious on us." Critic Howard Cohen wrote that, in contrast to the flashy minimalist sound of Van Halen's earliest records, Balance features "grand production: big drums, ambient keyboard textures and other sonic frills."

"The Seventh Seal" kicks off the album. Complete with chanting monks and dangling metal bells, the song unveiled a vast, open, U2-like guitar wall that propelled through the darkest terrain the band ever tackled. Eddie revealed in 2012 that "The Seventh Seal" was written before Van Halen became a band. In an August 1995 interview with Total Guitar, Eddie took credit for "[doing] these weird monk sounds at the very top of the record", though they have also been credited to monks from Gyuto Tantric University in Tibet. One reviewer noted the song's "decidedly Zeppish salvo of pseudo-mysticism" and described the Gyoto monks as a sample, while Vulture's Chuck Klosterman compares it a "mid-period Yes album".

"Can't Stop Lovin' You" is a ballad that has been compared to the style of 5150 (1986), with an especially 1980s-style melody; its guitar tone has been compared to Tom Petty but with "strategically" deployed riffs. On "Don't Tell Me (What Love Can Do)", Hagar exhibits a social conscience similar to that of "Right Now" (1991), and meditates on the suicide of Kurt Cobain. Its guitar solo is atypical and has drawn comparison to Neil Young. "Big Fat Money" features changes in rhythm and fretboard textures, while "Not Enough" is a ballad written around a Ben Folds-esque piano part.

"Amsterdam" was written about Eddie and Alex's birthplace. Eddie told Guitar World: "I always hated the words to 'Wham, Bam Amsterdam', from Balance, because they were all about smoking pot. They were just stupid. Lyrics should plant some sort of seed for thought, or at least be a little more metamorphical." This is another song based on an idea that predates the album's sessions as there is video of Eddie playing the riff to "Amsterdam" at 5150 Studios in 1987.

Balance also features three instrumentals. "Strung Out", an avant-garde experiment described by Guitar World as a "strange piano piece", was reportedly recorded by Eddie in the early 1980s, having rented pianist Marvin Hamlisch's beach house for a summer vacation. The guitarist explained: "I just used to waste this beautiful piano. It was like a Baldwin or a Yamaha. It had cigarette burns all over it and I was sticking everything but the kitchen sink in it: ping-pong balls, D-cell batteries, knives, forks – I even broke a few strings. I don't know what prompted me to do it. I was just fucking around. Actually, it started off with me playing the strings with my fingers. I would create harmonics by hitting the key and muffling the string up and down to bring harmonics out like on a guitar." According to Eddie, Fairbarn "loved it" and selected it for inclusion on Balance from the numerous tapes of these experiments that Eddie owned. "Doin' Time" has been described as a drum solo, though Eddie disagreed and called it "a little intro" for the next song. Klosterman compares it to the material on side two of Pearl Jam's Vitalogy (1994), while music critic Johnny Cigarettes describes "Strung Out" and "Doin' Time", respectively, as "roughly approximating a carpenter next door and a toddler banging pots and pans."

"Baluchitherium" has been compared to Jeff Beck. According to Eddie: "It didn't start out being an instrumental track, it's just nobody kinda liked where we were going with it. So we just left the vocal off – and just like basically any Van Halen song, you take the vocals off and the music still holds up. And here's the proof because this one held up. And we thought, "Oh fuck it, let's put it out like that." It's like what we were doing with the singing, with the vocal, it just didn't add shit to it so we left it right off." The final minute of the song features a programmed rhythm.

During the Balance Tour show in Pensacola, Florida, Hagar stated that "Take Me Back (Déjà Vu)" was "a true story". The song itself features a then almost 20-year-old riff Eddie had previously used on a song entitled "No More Waiting", which the band played on occasion in the pre-Van Halen I era, making it the third known song on the album based on an older idea. Klosterman notes the heavy use of wind chimes in the song, and compares Hagar's singing to Natalie Maines.

== Artwork ==
The original title of the album was The Seventh Seal, for which photographer Glen Wexler created some concepts, including one with an androgynous four-year-old boy. Eventually they picked Balance, which Alex explained to Wexler was about the turmoil and changes surrounding Van Halen, including the recent death of long-time manager Ed Leffler. Alex asked for something "exploring the duality of the human psyche"; Wexler then sketched some new concepts, with the band liking the one with conjoined twins on a see-saw. The androgynous boy, who actually hailed from Denver but fans mistakenly considered to be Eddie's son Wolfgang Van Halen, was then photographed in Wexler's Hollywood studio, with Wexler's daughter being the hand model that pulled his hair. The images were combined with a miniature landscape for the background using Fractal Design Painter (now called Corel Painter). Wexler detailed that the Balance cover had a number of ironies: "the impossibility of the conjoined twins actually playing on the seesaw; the 'calm' twin actually being the aggressive one, pulling the hair of his sibling to create the appearance of an aggressive child; and having no one else to play with in a desolate post-apocalyptic setting, in which unusable playground equipment is the only object in sight." He added that the twins were “designed” to mimic the shape of the “VH” logo. An alternate cover was used for the Japanese release, citing a cultural offense to the original version. On the inside, the compact disc shows the Leonardo da Vinci drawing Vitruvian Man, and the back of the booklet shows an egg balanced upright on a guitar.

== Release and promotion ==
Balance was released January 24, 1995, and is the first release by a platinum-certified act on Warner Bros. since Danny Goldberg stepped in as chairman/CEO. It is also the band's first album since the loss of their longtime manager Ed Leffler, who died of thyroid cancer on October 16, 1993, before Ray Danniels took over management of the band (mostly due to Alex's personal relationship with Danniels as brother-in-law). Warner Bros. VP of merchandising and advertising Jim Wagner said that early 1995 would be the right time to release a new Van Halen album, as "It seems like we've always had success with big acts right after the first of the year". (Van Halen's own 1984 was released in early January 1984.) "Don't Tell Me (What Love Can Do)", the first single from Balance, was released to top 40 and album rock radio on December 28, 1994. Van Halen became the first act to debut at No. 1 in 1995, as their first week sales of 295,000 units earned Balance the number one spot on the Billboard 200. The opening-week tally for Van Halen's Balance was 21% higher than that of For Unlawful Carnal Knowledge, the band's previous studio album, which topped the chart with 243,000 units in the summer of 1991.

In the United Kingdom, Balance reached number 8 on the UK Albums Chart, becoming their first British Top 10 placing; Martin C. Strong believes its UK sales were helped by the rare European tour undertaken by the group. In The Encyclopedia of Popular Music, author Colin Larkin commented how Balance reconfirmed how the band's popularity was "seemingly impervious to the ravages of time or fashion."

Two concerts during the Balance tour were filmed and aired as a pay-per-view event at the Molson Amphitheatre in Toronto, Ontario, Canada on August 18 and 19. There was talk of releasing a live DVD of the performances, which found the band to be at their peak during the tour. While the release of the DVD never materialized, most of the source material can be viewed on YouTube.

== Critical reception ==
Professional ratings
Review scores
| Source | Rating |
|---|---|
| AllMusic | 2/5 stars |
| The Encyclopedia of Popular Music | 3/5 stars |
| Entertainment Weekly | C+ |
| The Great Rock Discography | 5/10 |
| NME | 2/10 |
| Rolling Stone | 3.5/5 stars |
| The Rolling Stone Album Guide | 1/5 stars |
| San Francisco Examiner | 3/5 stars |
| Select | 1/5 stars |

Reviewing Balance for Rolling Stone, Paul Evans commented on the album's "surprises", saying: "While Eddie's new look, a goatee and chopped pompadour, may seem a nod to the plaid-clad ranks, there's nothing alternative about Balance. Nor, despite the Buddhist chanting that kicks off the disc, is there anything otherwise chic." Evans noted that Eddie dominates the album with majestic riffs, but further praised the other musicians, including highlighting Alex's "thunder-bucket snare" as the group's "secret weapon", and approving of Hagar's role as "a sort of Everyman as a rock star, a true vox populi." The San Francisco Examiner critic Joel Selvin wrote that Fairbairn's production had not changed Van Halen's sound and comments that, although subtleties are rare in the band's work, touches of keyboards and acoustic guitar are present in the back of the mix. The reviewer highlighted the guitar work in "Amsterdam" and felt that the pair of "uncharacteristic" instrumentals "pass for innovation."

In Britain, NME reviewer Johnny Cigarettes dismissed the group's more serious direction, wishing for a return to the "over-exuberant, good-time show metal about the simple pleasures in life" that had typified the band's tenure with David Lee Roth. He wrote that despite the promising lyrics for "Amsterdam" and "Big Fat Money", the music resembled a "mess of blues, pseudo-epic folk, and Sammy Hagar's bland gravel-u-like vocal blusterings", adding that the "wanktackularly pretentious" instrumentals further ruined the album. Andrew Mueller of Melody Maker similarly bemoaned how the band had become "a flimsy pretext for the widdly-widdlying of Eddie van Halen and the ridiculous grunting of sweaty hod-carrier Sammy Hagar", dismissing the later for being "caught halfway between Muttley from The Macc Lads and The Neph's Carl McCoy."

Reviewing the album for Select, Clark Collis wrote that Van Halen had become humourless since Lee Roth's departure, with Balance doing "little to remedy" this. He added: "Naming a track 'Seventh Seal' after the Ingmar Bergman movie may be an attempt to make an asset out of their dourness. But, 50 minutes of join-the-dots fretwork and dull HM shenanigans later, you decide." Deborah Frost of Entertainment Weekly opined that the songs "sound as clumsily grafted together as the computer-manipulated Siamese-twin cover art", adding that although Eddie sporadically "whips off the odd pantheon-worthy move", his bandmates "might as well be on vacation." Centre Daily Times critic Howard Cohen believed the album lacked memorable melodies, with a wall of sound production that "threatens to obscure Van Halen's playing"; but called it a "step up" from its "uninspired and juvenile" predecessor, For Unlawful Carnal Knowledge.

Retrospectively, AllMusic reviewer Stephen Thomas Erlewine writes that Balance "tries to open up the Van Hagar formula somewhat", with Eddie placing stronger emphasis on subtle ballads and heavy rockers, but believes his attempts are "weighed down by the most predictable rhythm section in all of rock & roll, which gives each number the same unvarying deadlocked pulse, completely obliterating Eddie's increased musical sensitivity." In The Rolling Stone Album Guide (2004), Balance is dismissed as "a disgrace, from the pseudo-religious 'The Seventh Seal' (featuring, for real, the monks of Gyuto Tantric University in Tibet) to Hagar's ode to smoking 'Panama red' in 'Amsterdam'." Consequence writer Steven Ovadia considers it "a shame" that Balance was Hagar's last album with Van Halen, because it "hints at a possible musical shift that might have resulted in a different direction for the band". Commenting on Eddie's full integration of keyboard sounds and riffs into his guitar work, he said: "Balance saw Van Halen embrace a sonic shimmer that allowed him to evoke both instruments within one single performance in a way neither the guitarist nor the band had before, with Eddie flawlessly balancing the two."

== Legacy ==
Sammy Hagar has since expressed mixed opinions on Balance, reflecting on its difficult production, but noted the presence of several great songs, including the "Sammy grunge-type thing" he pursued on "Don't Tell Me (What Love Can Do)", and deeming it to be "more of a Sammy Hagar record than any of the other Van Halen albums. That is what's odd about that." He wrote that Fairbairn gave him "more trouble" than any other producer during his time with Van Halen.

Balance is ranked at number 477 in Martin Popoff's book The Top 500 Heavy Metal Albums of All Time (2010), compiled from the results of a large poll. Popoff himself believed the band were "running on fumes" by the recording of the album, despite the first-rate production of Fairbairn and Eddie and Alex "shining brightly with their respective personal stamps". In rankings of the band's albums, Balance has been ranked 11th best (second worst) by Matthew Wilkening of Ultimate Classic Rock, Eduardo RivadavIa of Loudwire, and the staff of Consequence.

Wilkening commented that songs like "Don’t Tell Me (What Love Can Do)" and "Take Me Back (Deja Vu)" showed Van Halen "tackling more serious subjects and tones", but added that some songs "come off rather lifeless, as if the chemistry within this lineup had already gone sour." Rivadavia deemed "Can't Stop Loving You" and "Don't Tell Me (What Love Can Do)" to be "dialed in soft/hard singles", while "everything else sounded like leftovers from VH's previous album (not a terrible thing, but still). The inclusion of three instrumentals was, in retrospect, another dire omen of Eddie’s dwindling inspiration and Hagar’s diminishing interest." Consequence write that the album drags on far longer than other CD era-albums and add: "It would be all too easy to point to the rise of grunge and alternative as the reason the band falls so far out of alignment here, but the album's commercial success proves that losing currency wasn't the issue. And it's not like Van Halen were emulating grunge, or like they weren't up for trying new things — the album is introduced with throat chanting courtesy of The Monks of Gyuto Tantric University, for example, while Eddie tries his hand at an Elton John/Billy Joel-style piano ballad on "Not Enough." And yet the music is almost utterly bereft of inspiration."

== Track listing ==
All tracks are written by Edward Van Halen, Michael Anthony, Sammy Hagar and Alex Van Halen.

| No. | Title | Length |
|---|---|---|
| 1. | "The Seventh Seal" | 5:18 |
| 2. | "Can't Stop Lovin' You" | 4:08 |
| 3. | "Don't Tell Me (What Love Can Do)" | 5:56 |
| 4. | "Amsterdam" | 4:45 |
| 5. | "Big Fat Money" | 3:57 |
| 6. | "Strung Out" (instrumental) | 1:29 |
| 7. | "Not Enough" | 5:13 |
| 8. | "Aftershock" | 5:29 |
| 9. | "Doin' Time" (instrumental) | 1:41 |
| 10. | "Baluchitherium" (instrumental (Note: "Baluchitherium" was included on the CD and the European vinyl release but was omitted from the USA vinyl release due to time constraints. When Balance was remastered as part of the 2023 Hagar era box set The Collection II, "Baluchitherium" was removed from the CD entirely and moved to the 'Studio Rarities' bonus disc, despite it being on the original CD release. The box set CD also used the running order of the US vinyl release, which was different from the original 1995 CD.)) | 4:05 |
| 11. | "Take Me Back (Deja Vu)" | 4:43 |
| 12. | "Feelin'" | 6:36 |

Japanese bonus track
| No. | Title | Length |
|---|---|---|
| 13. | "Crossing Over (Note: The Japanese bonus track "Crossing Over" was used as the B-side to the US CD single for "Can't Stop Lovin' You" and was later included in the 'Studio Rarities' bonus disc as part of the 2023 Hagar era box set The Collection II. It was the only Van Halen song used as a b-side which was not taken from an album.)" | 4:49 |

The running order alters somewhat between the CD and vinyl versions, with "Doin' Time" and "Aftershock" being moved up into earlier positions on the vinyl versions.

1995 US vinyl edition Side A
| No. | Title | Length |
|---|---|---|
| 1. | "The Seventh Seal" | 5:18 |
| 2. | "Can't Stop Lovin' You" | 4:08 |
| 3. | "Don't Tell Me (What Love Can Do)" | 5:56 |
| 4. | "Amsterdam" | 4:45 |
| 5. | "Big Fat Money" | 3:57 |
| 6. | "Doin' Time" | 1:41 |

Side B
| No. | Title | Length |
|---|---|---|
| 1. | "Aftershock" | 5:29 |
| 2. | "Strung Out" | 1:29 |
| 3. | "Not Enough" | 5:13 |
| 4. | "Take Me Back (Déjà Vu)" | 4:43 |
| 5. | "Feelin'" | 6:36 |

1995 European vinyl edition Side A
| No. | Title | Length |
|---|---|---|
| 1. | "The Seventh Seal" | 5:18 |
| 2. | "Can't Stop Lovin' You" | 4:08 |
| 3. | "Don't Tell Me (What Love Can Do)" | 5:56 |
| 4. | "Amsterdam" | 4:45 |
| 5. | "Big Fat Money" | 3:57 |
| 6. | "Doin' Time" | 1:41 |

Side B
| No. | Title | Length |
|---|---|---|
| 1. | "Aftershock" | 5:29 |
| 2. | "Strung Out" | 1:29 |
| 3. | "Not Enough" | 5:13 |
| 4. | "Baluchitherium" | 4:05 |
| 5. | "Take Me Back (Déjà Vu)" | 4:43 |
| 6. | "Feelin'" | 6:36 |

== Personnel ==
Van Halen

- Sammy Hagar – lead and background vocals
- Edward Van Halen – guitar, keyboards, background vocals
- Michael Anthony – bass, background vocals
- Alex Van Halen – drums, percussion

Additional personnel

- Steve Lukather – background vocals ("Not Enough")
- The Monks of Gyuto Tantric University – chants ("The Seventh Seal")

Production

- Bruce Fairbairn – production
- Mike Fraser – mixing
- Jeri Heiden – art direction
- George Marino – mastering
- Donn Landee – remastering (2023)
- Erwin Musper – engineer
- Mike Plotnikoff – engineer
- Randee Saint Nicholas – photography
- Glen Wexler – front cover photography

== Charts ==
=== Weekly charts ===
| Chart (1995) | Peak position |
|---|---|
| Australian Albums (ARIA) | 9 |
| Austrian Albums (Ö3 Austria) | 18 |
| Canada Top Albums/CDs (RPM) | 2 |
| Dutch Albums (Album Top 100) | 5 |
| Finnish Albums (The Official Finnish Charts) | 5 |
| French Albums (SNEP) | 18 |
| German Albums (Offizielle Top 100) | 8 |
| Japanese Albums (Oricon) | 2 |
| New Zealand Albums (RMNZ) | 16 |
| Norwegian Albums (VG-lista) | 17 |
| Scottish Albums (Official Charts) | 9 |
| Swedish Albums (Sverigetopplistan) | 5 |
| Swiss Albums (Schweizer Hitparade) | 6 |
| UK Albums (Official Charts) | 8 |
| UK Rock & Metal Albums (Official Charts) | 2 |
| US Billboard 200 | 1 |

| Chart (2025) | Peak position |
|---|---|
| German Rock & Metal Albums (Offizielle Top 100) | 19 |
| Hungarian Albums (MAHASZ) | 10 |
| Japanese Rock Albums (Oricon) | 17 |

=== Year-end charts ===
| Chart (1995) | Position |
|---|---|
| German Albums (Offizielle Top 100) | 59 |
| Swiss Albums (Schweizer Hitparade) | 32 |
| US Billboard 200 | 26 |

== Certifications ==
| Region | Certification | Certified units/sales |
|---|---|---|
| Brazil (Pro-Música Brasil) | Gold | 100,000^{*} |
| Canada (Music Canada) | 3× Platinum | 300,000^{^} |
| Japan (RIAJ) | Platinum | 200,000^{^} |
| United States (RIAA) | 3× Platinum | 3,000,000^{^} |
^{*} Sales figures based on certification alone.^{^} Shipments figures based on certification alone.
