= Van Halen discography =

Recordings by American rock band

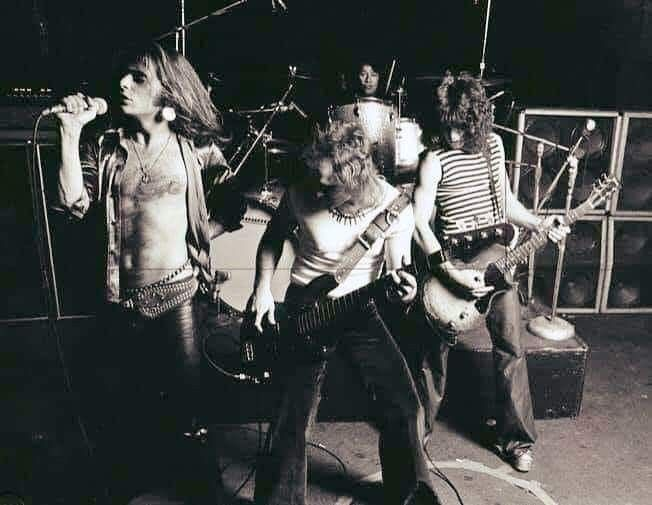
- Van Halen in 1978
- Studio albums: 12
- Live albums: 5
- Compilation albums: 4
- Singles: 56
- Video albums: 3
- Music videos: 33

Van Halen was an American hard rock band formed in Pasadena, California in 1972 by the Dutch-born American brothers Eddie Van Halen (guitar) and Alex Van Halen (drums), plus singer David Lee Roth and bassist Michael Anthony. The band's discography consists of 12 studio albums, three live albums, four compilation albums, and 56 singles.

The band signed a contract with Warner Bros. Records in 1977, and in the following year released the album Van Halen. Over the next few years, the band alternated album releases, one per year between 1979 and 1982, and touring to increasing commercial and critical acclaim, becoming one of the world's most successful and influential rock bands. In 1984, Van Halen released 1984, which peaked at No. 2 on the Billboard 200 and had the band's sole No. 1 hit on the Billboard Hot 100, "Jump". After the tour promoting that album, Roth left the band due to artistic and personal tensions with Eddie.

To replace Roth, Eddie picked Sammy Hagar, formerly of Montrose and at that time a very successful solo artist. Van Halen's first album with Hagar, 1986's 5150, was the band's first No. 1 on the Billboard 200. The three studio albums that followed, OU812, For Unlawful Carnal Knowledge and Balance, also topped the charts. In 1996, Hagar left Van Halen amidst similar tension with the Van Halen brothers.

Roth rejoined briefly and recorded two songs with the band for the 1996 compilation Best Of – Volume I, but Van Halen eventually settled on Gary Cherone, frontman of the then defunct Boston-based band Extreme. Cherone's sole release with the band was Van Halen III, released in 1998 to mixed reviews and diminishing sales, being the only Van Halen studio album not to get a platinum RIAA certification. Van Halen's last release for Warner was the 2004 compilation Best of Both Worlds, which featured three new songs with Hagar. In 2011, the band left the label and signed with Interscope Records.

In February 2012, Van Halen released its twelfth and final studio album, A Different Kind of Truth, featuring Roth on vocals and Eddie's son Wolfgang on bass guitar. The album debuted at number two on the Billboard 200, and became the band's highest-charting album on the UK Albums Chart with a sixth spot.

As of 2007, Van Halen has sold 75 million albums worldwide and have thirteen No. 1 hits on the Billboard Mainstream Rock chart. During the 1980s, they, along with the band Heart, had more Billboard Hot 100 hits, fifteen, than any other hard rock or heavy metal band. According to the RIAA, Van Halen is the 19th best-selling music group/artist of all time with sales of over 56.5 million albums in the US, and is one of five rock bands that have had two albums (Van Halen and 1984) sell more than ten million copies in the US.

== Albums ==
=== Studio albums ===
David Lee Roth era
Sammy Hagar era
Gary Cherone era

Title	Album details	Peak chart positions													Certifications (sales thresholds)
Title	Album details	US	CAN	AUS	SWI	AUT	NLD	DEN	SWE	FIN	NOR	GER	NZ	UK	Certifications (sales thresholds)
Van Halen	Released: February 10, 1978; Label: Warner Bros.; Format: LP, 8-track, CS, CD, digital	19	18	17	—	—	10	—	—	—	—	—	22	34	RIAA: Diamond; BPI: Gold; BVMI: Gold; IFPI FIN: Gold; MC: 4× Platinum; NVPI: Platinum; SNEP: Gold
Van Halen II	Released: March 23, 1979; Label: Warner Bros.; Format: LP, CS, 8-track, CD, digital	6	15	68	—	—	11	—	22	—	—	24	—	23	RIAA: 5× Platinum; MC: 2× Platinum; NVPI: Gold; SNEP: Gold
Women and Children First	Released: March 26, 1980; Label: Warner Bros.; Format: LP, CS, 8-track, CD, digital	6	12	—	—	—	3	—	19	—	23	19	48	15	RIAA: 3× Platinum; MC: 2× Platinum; NVPI: Gold; SNEP: Gold
Fair Warning	Released: April 29, 1981; Label: Warner Bros.; Format: LP, CS, 8-track, CD, digital	5	11	97	—	—	13	—	18	—	27	37	—	49	RIAA: 2× Platinum; MC: Platinum
Diver Down	Released: April 19, 1982; Label: Warner Bros.; Format: LP, CS, 8-track, CD, DVD-A, digital	3	5	79	—	—	28	—	28	—	19	65	37	36	RIAA: 4× Platinum; MC: Platinum
1984	Released: January 9, 1984; Label: Warner Bros.; Format: LP, CS, 8-track, CD, digital	2	1	11	7	12	8	—	4	—	12	11	15	15	RIAA: Diamond; BPI: Gold; BVMI: Platinum; MC: 5× Platinum; SNEP: Gold
5150	Released: March 24, 1986; Label: Warner Bros.; Format: CD, CS, LP, digital	1	2	5	16	13	30	—	2	—	5	11	13	16	RIAA: 6× Platinum; ARIA: 2× Platinum; BPI: Silver; BVMI: Gold; MC: 3× Platinum
OU812	Released: May 23, 1988; Label: Warner Bros.; Format: CD, CS, LP, digital	1	1	9	9	21	22	—	9	—	5	12	35	16	RIAA: 4× Platinum; BPI: Silver
For Unlawful Carnal Knowledge	Released: June 17, 1991; Label: Warner Bros.; Format: CD, CS, LP, digital	1	4	5	11	21	24	—	17	—	—	6	25	12	RIAA: 3× Platinum; BPI: Silver; MC: Platinum
Balance	Released: January 24, 1995; Label: Warner Bros.; Format: CD, CS, LP, digital	1	2	9	6	18	5	—	5	—	17	8	16	8	RIAA: 3× Platinum; MC: 3× Platinum
Van Halen III	Released: March 17, 1998; Label: Warner Bros.; Format: CD, CS, digital	4	4	8	38	23	24	7	39	5	29	13	14	43	RIAA: Gold
A Different Kind of Truth	Released: February 7, 2012; Label: Interscope; Format: CD, LP, digital	2	3	4	6	17	12	8	4	3	9	8	14	6	MC: Gold
"—" denotes releases that did not chart or were not released in that country.

=== Live albums ===
Title	Album details	Peak chart positions													Certifications (sales thresholds)
Title	Album details	US	CAN	AUS	SWI	AUT	NLD	DEN	SWE	FIN	NOR	GER	NZ	UK	Certifications (sales thresholds)
Live: Right Here, Right Now	Released: February 23, 1993; Label: Warner Bros.; Format: CD, CS	5	15	7	18	30	8	—	21	—	—	30	25	24	RIAA: 2× Platinum; MC: Gold
Tokyo Dome Live in Concert	Released: March 31, 2015; Label: Warner Bros.; Format: CD, digital, LP	20	24	67	59	—	48	—	—	—	—	64	—	74	
Live in Dallas 1991	Released: November 29, 2024; Label: Warner Bros.; Format: CD, digital, LP	—	—	—	—	—	—	—	—	—	—	—	—	—	
Live at Wembley	Released: January 9, 2026; Label: Warner Bros.; Format: CD, LP	—	—	—	—	—	—	—	—	—	—	—	—	—	
Live in New Haven 1986	Released: April 18, 2026; Label: Warner Bros.; Format: LP	—	—	—	—	—	—	—	—	—	—	—	—	25	
"—" denotes releases that did not chart or were not released in that country.

=== Compilation albums ===
Title	Album details	Peak chart positions													Certifications (sales thresholds)
Title	Album details	US	CAN	AUS	SWI	AUT	NLD	DEN	SWE	FIN	NOR	GER	NZ	UK	Certifications (sales thresholds)
Best Of – Volume I	Released: October 22, 1996; Label: Warner Bros.; Format: CD, CS	1	1	11	26	16	12	5	19	3	36	7	2	45	RIAA: 3× Platinum; ARIA: Platinum; BPI: Gold; BVMI: Gold; IFPI FIN: Gold; MC: 2× Platinum
The Best of Both Worlds	Released: July 20, 2004; Label: Warner Bros.; Format: CD	3	2	31	55	33	—	25	12	4	17	28	9	15	RIAA: Platinum; BPI: Gold
The Collection 1978–1984	Released: August 25, 2023; Label: Warner Bros., Rhino; Format: LP, CD, digital	—	—	—	—	—	—	—	—	—	—	—	—	—	
The Collection II	Released: October 6, 2023; Label: Rhino; Format: LP, CD, digital	62	—	—	—	—	—	—	—	—	—	27	—	—	
"—" denotes releases that did not chart or were not released in that country.

=== Box sets ===
Title	Album details
The Japanese Singles 1978–1984	Released: November 1, 2019; Label: Warner Bros./Rhino; Format: 7" EP x 13

== Singles ==
Title	Year	Peak chart positions							Certifications (sales thresholds)	Album
Title	Year	US	US Main	AUS	CAN	IRE	NLD	UK	Certifications (sales thresholds)	Album
"You Really Got Me"	1978	36	—	12	49	—	—	—		Van Halen
"Runnin' with the Devil" [1]	1978	84	—	—	—	—	2	52		Van Halen
"Jamie's Cryin'"	1978	—	—	—	—	—	—	—		Van Halen
"On Fire" [A]	1978	—	—	—	—	—	—	—		Van Halen
"Ain't Talkin' 'bout Love"	1978	—	—	—	—	—	—	—		Van Halen
"Dance the Night Away"	1979	15	—	—	28	—	—	—		Van Halen II
"Beautiful Girls"	1979	84	—	—	—	—	—	—		Van Halen II
"Somebody Get Me a Doctor" [A]	1979	—	—	—	—	—	—	—		Van Halen II
"And the Cradle Will Rock..."	1980	55	—	—	81	—	—	—		Women and Children First
"Mean Street" [B]	1981	—	12	—	—	—	—	—		Fair Warning
"Push Comes to Shove" [airplay]	1981	—	29	—	—	—	—	—		Fair Warning
"So This Is Love?"	1981	110	15	—	20	—	—	—		Fair Warning
"Unchained" [C]	1981	—	13	—	—	—	—	—		Fair Warning
"Hear About It Later" [D]	1981	—	—	—	—	—	—	—		Fair Warning
"(Oh) Pretty Woman"	1982	12	1	59	5	—	28	47		Diver Down
"Little Guitars" [airplay]	1982	—	33	—	—	—	—	—		Diver Down
"Where Have All the Good Times Gone!" [airplay]	1982	—	17	—	—	—	—	—		Diver Down
"Dancing in the Street" b/w "The Full Bug"	1982	38 —	3; 42	— —	15 —	— —	— —	— —		Diver Down
"Secrets"	1982	—	22	—	—	—	—	—		Diver Down
"Jump"	1983	1	1	2	1	2	34	7	RIAA: Gold; BPI: 2× Platinum	1984
"I'll Wait"	1984	13	2	—	21	—	—	85		1984
"Panama"	1984	13	2	74	15	30	—	61	BPI: Silver	1984
"Hot for Teacher"	1984	56	24	89	83	—	—	87		1984
"Why Can't This Be Love"	1986	3	1	8	13	8	15	8		5150
"Dreams"	1986	22	6	51	85	25	—	62		5150
"Love Walks In"	1986	22	4	—	65	—	—	—		5150
"Summer Nights" [promo]	1986	—	33	—	—	—	—	—		5150
"Best of Both Worlds"	1986	—	12	—	—	—	—	—		5150
"Black and Blue"	1988	34	1	—	42	—	—	—		OU812
"When It's Love"	1988	5	1	23	21	23	—	28		OU812
"Cabo Wabo" [airplay]	1988	—	31	—	—	—	—	—		OU812
"Mine All Mine" [airplay]	1988	—	50	—	—	—	—	—		OU812
"Finish What Ya Started"	1988	13	2	123	—	—	—	—		OU812
"Feels So Good"	1989	35	6	—	—	—	—	63		OU812
"Poundcake"	1991	—	1	55	55	—	—	74		For Unlawful Carnal Knowledge
"Runaround"	1991	—	1	169	50	—	—	—		For Unlawful Carnal Knowledge
"Top of the World"	1991	27	1	162	23	—	—	63		For Unlawful Carnal Knowledge
"Right Now"	1992	55	2	—	—	—	—	—		For Unlawful Carnal Knowledge
"The Dream Is Over" [airplay]	1992	—	7	—	—	—	—	—		For Unlawful Carnal Knowledge
"Man on a Mission" [airplay]	1992	—	21	—	—	—	—	—		For Unlawful Carnal Knowledge
"Jump" (live)	1993	—	—	93	—	13	12	26		Live: Right Here, Right Now
"Won't Get Fooled Again" (live)	1993	—	1	—	64	—	—	—		Live: Right Here, Right Now
"Dreams" (live)	1993	111	—	—	—	—	—	—		Live: Right Here, Right Now
"Don't Tell Me (What Love Can Do)"	1995	—	1	107	36	—	31	27		Balance
"The Seventh Seal" [airplay]	1995	—	36	—	—	—	—	—		Balance
"Can't Stop Lovin' You"	1995	30	2	105	3	—	—	33		Balance
"Amsterdam"	1995	—	9	—	46	—	—	77		Balance
"Not Enough"	1995	97	27	—	6	—	—	—		Balance
"Humans Being"	1996	—	1	—	47	—	—	—		Twister: Music from the Motion Picture Soundtrack
"Me Wise Magic"	1996	—	1	126	14	—	—	—		Best Of: Volume I
"Can't Get This Stuff No More"	1997	—	12	—	38	—	—	—		Best Of: Volume I
"Without You"	1998	—	1	56	55	—	—	—		Van Halen III
"One I Want"	1998	—	27	—	—	—	—	—		Van Halen III
"Fire in the Hole"	1998	—	6	206	65	—	—	—		Van Halen III
"It's About Time" [promo]	2004	—	6	—	—	—	—	—		The Best of Both Worlds
"Up for Breakfast" [promo]	2004	—	33	—	—	—	—	—		The Best of Both Worlds
"Tattoo"	2012	67	13	—	62	—	—	—		A Different Kind of Truth
"She's the Woman"	2012	—	23	—	—	—	—	—		A Different Kind of Truth
"—" denotes releases that did not chart or were not released in that country.

Notes

- 1 UK and NL position for 1980 re-release
- A released in Japan
- B released in some European territories
- C released in Europe and Japan
- D released in the Netherlands

== Videography ==
=== Video albums ===
Title	Year	Certification	Vocalist
Live Without a Net	1986	RIAA: 2× Platinum	Sammy Hagar
Live: Right Here, Right Now	1993	RIAA: Gold	Sammy Hagar
Video Hits Volume I	1998	RIAA: Gold; ARIA: Platinum	David Lee Roth, Sammy Hagar, and Gary Cherone

=== Music videos ===
Year	Title	Director	Album
1978	"You Really Got Me"	Unknown	Van Halen
1978	"Runnin' with the Devil"	Unknown	Van Halen
1978	"Jamie's Cryin'"	Unknown	Van Halen
1979	"Dance the Night Away"	Bruce Gowers	Van Halen II
1979	"Bottoms Up!"	Bruce Gowers	Van Halen II
1980	"And the Cradle Will Rock..."	Unknown	Women and Children First
1980	"Loss of Control"	Unknown	Women and Children First
1981	"So This Is Love?"	Bruce Gowers	Fair Warning
1981	"Unchained"	Robert Lombard	Fair Warning
1983	"(Oh) Pretty Woman"	Robert Lombard	Diver Down
1983	"Jump"	Pete Angelus and David Lee Roth	1984
1984	"Panama"	Pete Angelus	1984
1984	"Hot for Teacher"	Pete Angelus and David Lee Roth	1984
1986	"Why Can't This Be Love?"	Brian Grant	5150
1986	"Dreams"	John Beug	5150
1986	"Love Walks In"	Danny Kleinman	5150
1986	"Best of Both Worlds"	Danny Kleinman	5150
1988	"When It's Love"	Jeremiah Chechik	OU812
1988	"Finish What Ya Started"	Andy Morahan	OU812
1989	"Feels So Good"	Andy Morahan	OU812
1991	"Poundcake"	Andy Morahan	For Unlawful Carnal Knowledge
1991	"Top of the World"	Meiert Avis	For Unlawful Carnal Knowledge
1991	"Runaround"	Meiert Avis	For Unlawful Carnal Knowledge
1992	"Right Now"	Mark Fenske	For Unlawful Carnal Knowledge
1994	"Don't Tell Me (What Love Can Do)"	Peter Christopherson	Balance
1995	"Can't Stop Lovin' You"	Peter Christopherson	Balance
1995	"Amsterdam"	Unknown	Balance
1995	"Not Enough"	Jeth Weinrich	Balance
1996	"Humans Being"	Rocky Schenck	Twister: Music from the Motion Picture Soundtrack
1998	"Without You"	Paul Andresen	Van Halen III
1998	"Fire in the Hole"	Rocky Schenck	Van Halen III
2012	"Tattoo"	Unknown	A Different Kind of Truth
2012	"She's the Woman"	Unknown	A Different Kind of Truth
