= The Best of Both Worlds (Van Halen album) =

Greatest hits album by Van Halen
- Released: July 20, 2004
- Recorded: 1977–1994, 2004
- Genres: Hard rock; heavy metal; glam metal
- Length: 156:57
- Label: Warner Bros.
- Producers: Van Halen; Ted Templeman; Mick Jones; Donn Landee; Andy Johns; Bruce Fairbairn; Glen Ballard

Van Halen chronology
Van Halen III (1998)	The Best of Both Worlds (2004)	A Different Kind of Truth (2012)

Singles from The Best of Both Worlds
- 1. "It's About Time" Released: June 2004; 2. "Up for Breakfast" Released: August 2004

Professional ratings
Review scores
Source	Rating
AllMusic	4.5/5 stars
Entertainment Weekly	B
Rolling Stone	3.5/5 stars

The Best of Both Worlds is the second greatest hits album by American rock band Van Halen, released on July 20, 2004, on Warner Bros. The compilation features material recorded with lead vocalists David Lee Roth and Sammy Hagar, but omits Gary Cherone's three-year tenure with the band. Prior to The Best of Both Worlds's release, Hagar reunited with Van Halen, and the band recorded three new tracks to include on the release. Two of three new tracks were released as promo singles and appeard on the US Mainstream Rock chart, "It's About Time" (#6) and "Up for Breakfast" (#33).

Debuting at #3 in the US, the album coincided with a reunion tour, and certified Platinum. It is the last Van Halen album to feature contributions from Hagar.

== Background ==
The compilation features 16 tracks taken from the six David Lee Roth era albums (1978–1984), and 14 from the four Sammy Hagar era albums (1986–1995), plus three live songs with Hagar from Live: Right Here, Right Now (1993), and three new songs with Hagar made for the compilation. The album was released in promotion of the new reunion tour featuring Hagar returning as lead singer. The three new songs were also performed live at various times.

Michael Anthony did not play bass guitar for the three new songs, although he did provide backing vocals for them. He also did not write any of the three songs. Anthony was not an official band member at that point and the songs were recorded before he rejoined. The bass guitar on the new songs was played by Eddie Van Halen.

According to Anthony, the original plans involved one disc of songs recorded with Roth and another of songs recorded with Hagar, with the three new songs appearing on the Roth disc.

== Track listing ==
All tracks are written by Edward Van Halen, Alex Van Halen, Michael Anthony and David Lee Roth, except where noted.

Disc one
No.	Title	Writer(s)	Original album	Length
1.	"Eruption"		Van Halen, 1978	1:43
2.	"It's About Time"	E. Van Halen; Sammy Hagar; A. Van Halen	New song	4:15
3.	"Up for Breakfast"	E. Van Halen; Hagar; A. Van Halen	New song	4:57
4.	"Learning to See"	E. Van Halen; Hagar; A. Van Halen	New song	5:15
5.	"Ain't Talkin' 'bout Love"		Van Halen	3:48
6.	"Finish What Ya Started"	Anthony; Hagar; A. Van Halen; E. Van Halen	OU812, 1988	4:24
7.	"You Really Got Me"	Ray Davies	Van Halen	2:38
8.	"Dreams"	Anthony; Hagar; A. Van Halen; E. Van Halen	5150, 1986	4:53
9.	"Hot for Teacher"		1984, 1984	4:43
10.	"Poundcake"	Anthony; Hagar; A. Van Halen; E. Van Halen	For Unlawful Carnal Knowledge, 1991	5:20
11.	"And the Cradle Will Rock..."		Women and Children First, 1980	3:34
12.	"Black and Blue"	Anthony; Hagar; A. Van Halen; E. Van Halen	OU812	5:27
13.	"Jump"		1984	4:04
14.	"Top of the World"	Anthony; Hagar; A. Van Halen; E. Van Halen	For Unlawful Carnal Knowledge	3:54
15.	"(Oh) Pretty Woman"	William Dees; Roy Orbison	Diver Down, 1982	2:53
16.	"Love Walks In"	Anthony; Hagar; A. Van Halen; E. Van Halen	5150	5:11
17.	"Beautiful Girls"		Van Halen II, 1979	3:57
18.	"Can't Stop Lovin' You"	Anthony; Hagar; A. Van Halen; E. Van Halen	Balance, 1995	4:08
19.	"Unchained"		Fair Warning, 1981	3:29
Total length:				78:33

Disc two
No.	Title	Writer(s)	Original album	Length
1.	"Panama"		1984	3:32
2.	"Best of Both Worlds"	Anthony; Hagar; A. Van Halen; E. Van Halen	5150	4:49
3.	"Jamie's Cryin'"		Van Halen	3:30
4.	"Runaround"	Anthony; Hagar; A. Van Halen; E. Van Halen	For Unlawful Carnal Knowledge	4:20
5.	"I'll Wait"	E. Van Halen; A. Van Halen; Anthony; Roth; Michael McDonald	1984	4:42
6.	"Why Can't This Be Love"	Anthony; Hagar; A. Van Halen; E. Van Halen	5150	3:48
7.	"Runnin' with the Devil"		Van Halen	3:36
8.	"When It's Love"	Anthony; Hagar; A. Van Halen; E. Van Halen	OU812	5:38
9.	"Dancing in the Street"	Marvin Gaye; Ivy Hunter; William Stevenson	Diver Down	3:45
10.	"Strung Out"/"Not Enough"	Anthony; Hagar; A. Van Halen; E. Van Halen	Balance	6:48
11.	"Feels So Good"	Anthony; Hagar; A. Van Halen; E. Van Halen	OU812	4:32
12.	"Right Now"	Anthony; Hagar; A. Van Halen; E. Van Halen	For Unlawful Carnal Knowledge	5:22
13.	"Everybody Wants Some!!"		Women and Children First	5:10
14.	"Dance the Night Away"		Van Halen II	3:10
15.	"Ain't Talkin' 'bout Love" (live)		Live: Right Here, Right Now, 1993	4:43
16.	"Panama" (live)		Live: Right Here, Right Now	6:39
17.	"Jump" (live)		Live: Right Here, Right Now	4:20
Total length:				78:24

Notes

- Track 6 on disc one, "Finish What Ya Started," has no fade out unlike the album version on OU812.
- Track 15 on disc one, "(Oh) Pretty Woman," is the single edit version (with the first snare drum hit removed), not the version that appeared on Diver Down. The album version segues directly from the preceding track, "Intruder".
- Track 10 on disc two combines the instrumental "Strung Out" with "Not Enough," although it is shown on the album track list as simply "Not Enough". Both songs are listed as individual tracks on Balance.

== Personnel ==
Van Halen

- Sammy Hagar – lead vocals on tracks 2–4, 6, 8, 10, 12, 14, 16, 18 on disc 1; 2, 4, 6, 8, 10–12, on disc 2, rhythm guitar, backing vocals
- Edward Van Halen – lead guitar, rhythm guitar, acoustic guitar, keyboards, backing vocals, bass on tracks 2–4 on disc 1
- Alex Van Halen – drums, percussion
- David Lee Roth – lead and backing vocals on tracks 5, 7, 9, 11, 13, 15, 17, 19 on disc 1; 1, 3, 5, 7, 9, 13, 14 on disc 2
- Michael Anthony – bass, except on tracks 2–4 on disc 1, backing vocals

Additional musicians

- Steve Lukather – backing vocals on tracks 2–4, 14 on disc 1; 10 on disc 2

Production

- Compilation producer: Van Halen
- Engineer: Bill Malina (on new songs)
- Product manager: Kenny Nemes
- Project assistants: Hugh Brown, Tom Consolo, Malia Doss, Jimmy Edwards, Alan Fletcher, Kevin Gore, Bill Inglot, Joanne Jaworowski, Anna Loynes, Mark McKenna, David McLees, Scott Pascucci
- Mastering supervisor: Glen Ballard (producer on new songs)
- Remastering: Stephen Marcussen
- Editorial supervision: Cory Frye
- Art direction: Sara Cumings, Jeri Heiden
- Design: Sara Cumings, Jeri Heiden
- Photography: Kevin Westenberg
- Liner notes: David Wild
- Discographical annotation: Steve Woolard

== Charts ==
=== Weekly charts ===
Chart (2004–07)	Peak position
Australian Albums (ARIA)	31
Austrian Albums (Ö3 Austria)	33
Canadian Albums (Billboard)	2
Danish Albums (Hitlisten)	25
Finnish Albums (Suomen virallinen lista)	4
French Compilations	27
German Albums (Offizielle Top 100)	28
Irish Albums (IRMA)	56
Italian Albums (FIMI)	34
New Zealand Albums (RMNZ)	9
Norwegian Albums (VG-lista)	17
Scottish Albums (Official Charts)	12
Swedish Albums (Sverigetopplistan)	12
Swiss Albums (Schweizer Hitparade)	55
UK Albums (Official Charts)	15
US Billboard 200	3

=== Year-end charts ===
Chart (2004)	Position
US Billboard 200	166

=== Singles ===
Year	Single	Chart	Position
2004	"It's About Time"	Mainstream Rock Tracks	6
2004	"Up for Breakfast"	Mainstream Rock Tracks	33

== Certification ==
Region	Certification	Certified units/sales
United Kingdom (BPI)	Gold	100,000^{^}
United States (RIAA)	Platinum	1,000,000^{^}
^{^} Shipments figures based on certification alone.
