= The Collection II =

Box set by Van Halen
- Released: October 6, 2023
- Recorded: 1985–1996, 2004
- Genres: Hard rock; heavy metal
- Length: 3:49:36
- Label: Warner
- Producers: Van Halen; Donn Landee; Mick Jones; Ted Templeman; Andy Johns; Bruce Fairbairn; Glen Ballard

Van Halen chronology
The Collection 1978–1984 (2023)	The Collection II (2023)	Live in Dallas 1991 (2024)

Professional ratings
Review scores
Source	Rating
AllMusic	4/5 stars

The Collection II is the fourth compilation album by American rock band Van Halen, focusing on the era when Sammy Hagar was the lead singer. It was released on October 6, 2023, by Warner Records. The collection includes remastered versions of four studio albums and a fifth disc of rarities spanning 1989–2004. It is the band's second album to be released after Eddie Van Halen died in 2020.

All the music in the set was mastered directly from the original master tapes, a process overseen by the band's longtime engineer, Donn Landee. The album debuted and peaked at No. 62 on the Billboard 200, making it their newest material to peak at the Billboard 200 since Tokyo Dome Live in Concert.

== Track listings ==
=== 5150 track listing ===
All tracks are written by Edward Van Halen, Sammy Hagar, Michael Anthony, and Alex Van Halen.

Side one
No.	Title	Length
1.	"Good Enough"	4:05
2.	"Why Can't This Be Love"	3:48
3.	"Get Up"	4:37
4.	"Dreams"	4:54
5.	"Summer Nights"	5:06
Total length:		22:30

Side two
No.	Title	Length
6.	"Best of Both Worlds"	4:49
7.	"Love Walks In"	5:11
8.	"5150"	5:44
9.	"Inside"	5:02
Total length:		20:46

=== Studio Rarities 1989-2004 ===
All tracks are written by Edward Van Halen, Alex Van Halen, Sammy Hagar, and Michael Anthony, except where noted.

Side one
No.	Title	Writer(s)	Length
1.	"A Apolitical Blues"	Lowell George	3:51
2.	"Baluchitherium"		4:05
3.	"Crossing Over"		5:03
4.	"Respect the Wind"	Eddie Van Halen; Alex Van Halen	5:49

Side two
No.	Title	Writer(s)	Length
5.	"Humans Being"		3:57
6.	"It's About Time"	Eddie Van Halen; Alex Van Halen; Sammy Hagar	4:15
7.	"Up for Breakfast"	Eddie Van Halen; Alex Van Halen; Sammy Hagar	4:57
8.	"Learning to See"	Eddie Van Halen; Alex Van Halen; Sammy Hagar	5:15

== Personnel ==
=== Van Halen ===
- Sammy Hagar – vocals, backing vocals, guitars
- Edward Van Halen – guitars, keyboards, backing vocals
- Alex Van Halen – drums
- Michael Anthony – bass, backing vocals

=== Guest musicians ===
- Steve Lukather – background vocals ("Top of the World", "Not Enough")
- The Monks of Gyuto Tantric University – chants ("The Seventh Seal")

== Charts ==
Chart (2023)	Peak position
Belgian Albums (Ultratop Flanders)	80
Belgian Albums (Ultratop Wallonia)	164
German Albums (Offizielle Top 100)	27
US Billboard 200	62
