= Live: Right Here, Right Now =

1993 live album by Van Halen

Live: Right Here, Right Now.

Live album by Van Halen
- Released: February 23, 1993
- Recorded: May 14–15, 1992
- Venue: Selland Arena (Fresno, California)
- Genres: Hard rock; heavy metal
- Length: 141:29
- Label: Warner Bros.
- Producers: Van Halen; Andy Johns

Van Halen chronology
For Unlawful Carnal Knowledge (1991)	Live: Right Here, Right Now. (1993)	Balance (1995)

Singles from Live: Right Here, Right Now.
- 1. "Jump" Released: March 15, 1993; 2. "Won't Get Fooled Again" Released: February 1993; 3. "Dreams" Released: 1993

Sammy Hagar chronology
For Unlawful Carnal Knowledge (1991)	Live: Right Here, Right Now. (1993)	Balance (1995)

Professional ratings
Review scores
Source	Rating
AllMusic	2/5 stars
CD Review	1/5 stars
Entertainment Weekly	C
Q	4/5 stars
The Rolling Stone Album Guide	2/5 stars

Live: Right Here, Right Now. is the first live album by American rock band Van Halen, released in 1993. It was the only live album by Van Halen until the release of Tokyo Dome Live in Concert in 2015 featuring David Lee Roth and was the band's only live album featuring Sammy Hagar until the release of Live in Dallas 1991 in 2024.

== History ==
The album combines songs performed over two nights in May 1992 at the Selland Arena in Fresno, California. Most of the songs on the album were from the first night, such as the solos performed by Eddie Van Halen and Sammy Hagar. There is much debate as to whether or not the songs on this album have been doctored in the studio, as the original 1992 broadcast of the concert was much more raw and unmixed, sounding truer to the band's live sound than the recording that was ultimately released. Sammy Hagar confirms in his book, Red, My Uncensored Life in Rock that he had to "go into the studio vocal booth at 5150 with a video of the concert playing on a TV and had to re-sing the whole show". This was due to the brothers correcting things in post production that either changed the speed of his vocals or the key he was in.

The album contained only four David Lee Roth-era songs (including Van Halen's arrangement of "You Really Got Me" by The Kinks), one song from Sammy Hagar's pre-Van Halen solo career and 1 song from his 1987 album I Never Said Goodbye which was released while he was in the band. It also featured drum and bass solos and a cover of a song by The Who, one of the band's influences. As was the case with all tours with Hagar, the band focused on songs from the new album, Hagar's solo material and covers. The then-current album For Unlawful Carnal Knowledge is very well represented, with ten of the eleven songs originally featured on that album. ("The Dream Is Over" was the only track not included on the album, but it was included on the DVD release.)

The album cover photo was taken in June 1988, after a tornado touched down in Smyrna, Delaware.

For the 30th anniversary of the album, it was reissued on vinyl for the first time ever as a Record Store Day exclusive. It included three bonus tracks: "The Dream Is Over", "Eagles Fly", and "Mine All Mine". "The Dream Is Over" and "Eagles Fly" were the versions that were originally included on the video release but not the album, while "Mine All Mine" was originally the B-side to the "Jump" single from this album, recorded on the Japanese leg of the OU812 tour.

== Recording ==
Most of the tracks were recorded at the 1992 Fresno shows, as evidenced by both a 1992 Westwood One radio presentation and the video release. Studio fixes, however, were admittedly present on the album. Says Hagar,

"The problem was they re-recorded almost the entire live album, because Eddie was out of tune, or Al had sped up or slowed down. They fixed everything. Only now that Eddie was playing in tune, my singing's off-key. And where Al sped up in "Runaround", now I'm singing ahead of the beat. Now I had to go back in the studio and redo all my vocals. I wanted to kill those guys. They put me in a room with the video of the concert, gave me my microphone, and I stood there and sang the whole fucking concert one time through. Just like it was a live performance."

== Roth-era representation ==
Hagar sang four David Lee Roth era Van Halen songs on the album, "Panama" and "Jump" from 1984, and "Ain't Talkin' 'Bout Love" and "You Really Got Me" from Van Halen. "You Really Got Me" is stopped before the 2 minute mark and starts "Cabo Wabo", a Hagar-era song. "You Really Got Me" picks up again when "Cabo Wabo" is finished, thus making the two songs one track on the album.

Also, during the "316" track, Eddie plays portions of three instrumentals from the Roth-led years. They include "Cathedral" from Diver Down, "Eruption" from Van Halen and the intro to "Mean Street" from Fair Warning.

The "Ultra Bass" track is Michael Anthony's bass solo, occasionally accompanied by Alex Van Halen's drums. During his solo, Anthony plays a portion of the Fair Warning track "Sunday Afternoon in the Park", which originally was a keyboard track performed by Eddie.

== Track listing ==
All tracks are written by Edward Van Halen, Sammy Hagar, Michael Anthony, and Alex Van Halen, except where noted.

Disc one
No.	Title	Writer(s)	Original album (year)	Length
1.	"Poundcake"		For Unlawful Carnal Knowledge (1991)	5:28
2.	"Judgement Day"		For Unlawful Carnal Knowledge (1991)	4:52
3.	"When It's Love"		OU812 (1988)	5:22
4.	"Spanked"		For Unlawful Carnal Knowledge (1991)	5:08
5.	"Ain't Talkin' 'Bout Love"	E. Van Halen; A. Van Halen; Anthony; David Lee Roth	Van Halen (1978)	4:37
6.	"In 'n' Out"		For Unlawful Carnal Knowledge (1991)	6:21
7.	"Dreams"		5150 (1986)	4:49
8.	"Man on a Mission"		For Unlawful Carnal Knowledge (1991)	4:50
9.	"Ultra Bass (Note: Michael Anthony bass solo; features "The Star-Spangled Banner")"			5:15
10.	"Pleasure Dome / Drum Solo"		For Unlawful Carnal Knowledge (1991)	9:38
11.	"Panama"	E. Van Halen; A. Van Halen; Anthony; Roth	1984 (1984)	6:39
12.	"Love Walks In"		5150 (1986)	5:14
13.	"Runaround"		For Unlawful Carnal Knowledge (1991)	5:21
Total length:				73:34

Disc two
No.	Title	Writer(s)	Original album (year)	Length
1.	"Right Now"		For Unlawful Carnal Knowledge (1991)	6:13
2.	"One Way to Rock (Note: Sammy Hagar solo song)"	Hagar	Standing Hampton (1982)	4:58
3.	"Why Can't This Be Love"		5150 (1986)	5:22
4.	"Give to Live (Note: Sammy Hagar solo song)"	Hagar	I Never Said Goodbye (1987)	5:39
5.	"Finish What Ya Started"		OU812 (1988)	5:50
6.	"Best of Both Worlds"		5150 (1986)	5:00
7.	"316 (Note: Extended guitar solo; features "Eruption")"		For Unlawful Carnal Knowledge (1991)	11:37
8.	"You Really Got Me (Note: The Kinks cover) / Cabo Wabo"	Ray Davies: Hagar; E. Van Halen; A. Van Halen; Anthony	Van Halen (1978) / OU812 (1988)	7:58
9.	"Won't Get Fooled Again (Note: The Who cover)"	Pete Townshend		5:41
10.	"Jump"	E. Van Halen; A. Van Halen; Anthony; Roth	1984 (1984)	4:26
11.	"Top of the World"		For Unlawful Carnal Knowledge (1991)	4:59
Total length:				67:43

Japan exclusive 8 cm bonus disc
No.	Title	Writer(s)	Original album (year)	Length
1.	"Eagles Fly (Note: Sammy Hagar solo song)"	Hagar	I Never Said Goodbye (1987)	6:03
2.	"Mine All Mine" (Live in Tokyo, February 2, 1989)		OU812 (1988)	5:27

30th Anniversary LP side H bonus tracks
No.	Title	Writer(s)	Original album (year)	Length
1.	"The Dream is Over"		For Unlawful Carnal Knowledge (1991)	4:19
2.	"Eagles Fly"	Hagar	I Never Said Goodbye (1987)	5:48
3.	"Mine All Mine" (Live in Tokyo, February 2, 1989)		OU812 (1988)	5:24

† denotes a single

== Home video ==
Live: Right Here, Right Now.

Video by Van Halen
- Released: January 26, 1993
- Recorded: May 14–15, 1992
- Venues: Selland Arena, Fresno, California
- Genres: Hard rock; heavy metal
- Length: 120:00
- Label: Warner Reprise Video

Van Halen chronology
Live Without a Net (1986)	Live: Right Here, Right Now. (1993)	Video Hits Volume I (1996)

Professional ratings
Review scores
Source	Rating
AllMusic	1.5/5 stars

The footage was filmed with 15 cameras over two nights, May 14 and 15, 1992 and mixed together by editor Mitchell Sinoway, with the bulk of the footage and music coming from the second night. Three of the songs on this release were NOT performed on either night, or at all on the tour. They were instead filmed on-stage in an empty arena, and all were songs from the recent F.U.C.K album. The DVD is single-sided but dual-layer format, running approximately 120 minutes long. The only non-musical items are optional subtitles or closed captioning (DVD) plus a brief clip of each performer (not in concert) talking about music in general. 15 of the songs here were part of the 27 recordings from the live double-CD album with the addition of two songs which were not on the audio album: "The Dream Is Over" and "Eagles Fly".

=== Track listing ===
No.	Title	Writer(s)	Original album (year)	Length
1.	"Poundcake"		For Unlawful Carnal Knowledge (1991)	5:28
2.	"Judgement Day"		For Unlawful Carnal Knowledge (1991)	4:52
3.	"Man on a Mission"		For Unlawful Carnal Knowledge (1991)	4:49
4.	"When It's Love"		OU812 (1988)	5:22
5.	"In 'n' Out"		For Unlawful Carnal Knowledge (1991)	6:20
6.	"Right Now"		For Unlawful Carnal Knowledge (1991)	6:13
7.	"Ultra Bass"			5:15
8.	"Pleasure Dome / Drum Solo"		For Unlawful Carnal Knowledge (1991)	9:38
9.	"Spanked"		For Unlawful Carnal Knowledge (1991)	5:08
10.	"Runaround"		For Unlawful Carnal Knowledge (1991)	5:21
11.	"Finish What Ya Started"		OU812 (1988)	5:50
12.	"Eagles Fly"	Hagar	I Never Said Goodbye (1987)	6:03
13.	"316"		For Unlawful Carnal Knowledge (1991)	11:37
14.	"You Really Got Me / Cabo Wabo"	Davies: Hagar; E. Van Halen; A. Van Halen; Anthony	Van Halen (1978) / OU812 (1988)	7:58
15.	"The Dream is Over"		For Unlawful Carnal Knowledge (1991)	5:21
16.	"Jump"	E. Van Halen; A. Van Halen; Anthony; Roth	1984 (1984)	4:26
17.	"Top of the World"		For Unlawful Carnal Knowledge (1991)	4:59

== Personnel ==
Van Halen

- Edward Van Halen – lead guitar, keyboards, background vocals
- Alex Van Halen – drums, percussion
- Sammy Hagar – lead vocals, rhythm guitar
- Michael Anthony – bass guitar, background vocals
- Alan Fitzgerald – keyboards, background vocals (offstage, credited as "Eddie's keyboard tech")

Technical

- Producers: Van Halen, Andy Johns
- Live Recording Engineer: Biff Dawes
- Mobile Recording Facility: Westwood One Mobile Studio
- Mixing: Andy Johns
- Mixing assistant: Rail Jon Rogut
- Art direction: Jeri Heiden
- Design: Lyn Bradley, Jeri Heiden
- Photography: David Graham, John Halpern, Mark Seliger

== Charts ==
=== Album ===
Chart (1993)	Peak position
Australian Albums (ARIA)	7
Austrian Albums (Ö3 Austria)	30
Canada Top Albums/CDs (RPM)	15
Dutch Albums (Album Top 100)	8
Finnish Albums (The Official Finnish Charts)	5
German Albums (Offizielle Top 100)	30
Japanese Albums (Oricon)	4
Swedish Albums (Sverigetopplistan)	21
Swiss Albums (Schweizer Hitparade)	18
UK Albums (Official Charts)	24
US Billboard 200	5

Chart (2023)	Peak position
Hungarian Albums (MAHASZ)	12

=== Singles ===
Year	Title	Chart	Position
1993	"Won't Get Fooled Again"	US Mainstream Rock Tracks	1
1993	"Dreams" (Live)	US Bubbling Under Hot 100	11

== Certification ==
Audio

Region	Certification	Certified units/sales
Canada (Music Canada)	Gold	50,000^{^}
Japan (RIAJ)	Gold	100,000^{^}
United States (RIAA)	2× Platinum	2,000,000^{^}
^{^} Shipments figures based on certification alone.

1993 VHS

Region	Certification	Certified units/sales
United States (RIAA)	Gold	50,000^{^}
^{^} Shipments figures based on certification alone.
