= Live Without a Net (Van Halen video) =

Video by Van Halen
- Released: November 24, 1986
- Recorded: August 27, 1986
- Venue: Veterans Memorial Coliseum, New Haven, Connecticut
- Genre: Glam metal; hard rock; heavy metal
- Length: 92:00
- Label: Warner Reprise Video

Van Halen chronology
Live Without a Net (1986)	Live: Right Here, Right Now (1993)

Professional ratings
Review scores
Source	Rating
AllMusic	3/5 stars

Live Without a Net is a live video album by American hard rock band Van Halen, released by Warner Reprise Video on November 24, 1986. Recorded live at the Veterans Memorial Coliseum in New Haven, Connecticut on August 27, 1986, the concert was the band's first video release and was part of the 5150 Tour, supporting the album of the same name, Van Halen's first with lead vocalist Sammy Hagar.

== Track listing ==
All tracks are written by Edward Van Halen, Alex Van Halen, Sammy Hagar, and Michael Anthony, except where noted.

No.	Title	Writer(s)	Length
1.	"Introduction"
2.	"There's Only One Way to Rock" (Sammy Hagar solo song)	Hagar	5:45
3.	"Summer Nights"		5:06
4.	"Get Up"		4:37
5.	"Drum Solo"	A. Van Halen
6.	"5150"		5:44
7.	"Best of Both Worlds"		7:03
8.	"Bass Solo"	Anthony	3:31
9.	"Panama"	E. Van Halen; A. Van Halen; David Lee Roth; Anthony
10.	"Love Walks In"		5:11
11.	"Guitar Solo" (includes "316", "Eruption", "Cathedral", "Mean Street", and "Spanish Fly")	E. Van Halen
12.	"I Can't Drive 55" (Sammy Hagar solo song)	Hagar	5:08
13.	"Ain't Talkin' 'Bout Love"	E. Van Halen; A. Van Halen; Roth; Anthony
14.	"Why Can't This Be Love"		4:10
15.	"Rock 'N' Roll" (Led Zeppelin cover)	John Bonham; John Paul Jones; Jimmy Page; Robert Plant	3:26

== Personnel ==
- Michael Anthony – bass guitar, backing vocals
- Sammy Hagar – lead vocals, guitar (2, 10, 12–15)
- Alex Van Halen – drums, simmons electronic drums, percussion
- Eddie Van Halen – guitar, backing vocals, synthesizer (10, 14)

== Additional information ==
Songs appear in the concert film in a sequence that differs from the original performance, and at least four songs from the live show ("You Really Got Me", "Dreams", "Good Enough", and "Wild Thing") were omitted from the film entirely. Other edits to the concert were made, such as editing Eddie Van Halen's guitar solo slightly and cutting brief moments elsewhere from the night. The performance of "Best of Both Worlds", which included a portion of Robert Palmer's hit "Addicted to Love" was aired during the 1986 MTV Video Music Awards, but the Palmer section was edited out of the home video release. The same performance footage that aired during the MTV VMA's continued to include "Love Walks In", further illustrating the re-arranging of the playlist order for the edited home video version. Both aired in one continuous clip during the awards show. Continuity problems continued as displayed during the start of Eddie's guitar solo. At one point Eddie sticks his cigarette under the strings behind the nut. A few moments later, Eddie smokes his cigarette then discards it to the floor. A few seconds later the cigarette re-appears in its original place, behind the nut. Another problem occurred when Eddie Van Halen's Kramer 5150 broke a string during "I Can't Drive 55". After the bridge of the song, while Sammy was soloing, Eddie picked up his Steinberger 5150 guitar and used it to finish the song and to perform "Ain't Talkin' 'Bout Love".

Originally released on VHS and LaserDisc, Live Without A Net was re-released on DVD in 2004 with both Stereo and Surround Sound - Dolby 5.1 and DTS mixes. There is an Easter egg on the 2004 DVD, a short, silent clip of a man driving a small car and playing guitar. The clip is from the video Amsterdam by the band Guster. It can be accessed by opening the VTS files on your computer. The 2026 expanded edition of their 1986 album 5150 includes the concert in HD video on Blu-ray.

== Certifications ==
Region	Certification	Certified units/sales
Australia (ARIA)	Gold	7,500^{^}
United States (RIAA)	2× Platinum	200,000^{^}
^{^} Shipments figures based on certification alone.
