= The Collection 1978–1984 =

Box set by Van Halen
- Released: August 25, 2023
- Recorded: 1978–1984
- Genre: Rock
- Length: 3:17:14 (LP); 5:28:39 (Digital)
- Label: Warner
- Producer: Ted Templeman

Van Halen chronology
The Japanese Singles 1978–1984 (2019)	The Collection 1978–1984 (2023)	The Collection II (2023)

The Collection 1978–1984 is the third compilation album by American rock band Van Halen, released on August 25, 2023, on Warner Bros. and mastered by Chris Bellman in 2015.

The album consists of the first six studio albums which were released during the era when David Lee Roth was the lead singer. Unlike most of the studio albums mentioned, which come with reissues of the original album's inner sleeve, Women and Children First comes with a large, fold-out poster of David Lee Roth, similar with the poster included with the first pressing, back in 1980. It was the first album by the band to be released after Eddie Van Halen's death.

The Collection II was released as a second volume to this album on October 6, 2023.

== Track listing ==
All tracks are written by Edward Van Halen, Alex Van Halen, David Lee Roth and Michael Anthony, except where noted.

=== Digital bonus tracks ===
Extracts from Best of Vol. 1 (1996)
No.	Title	Length
1.	"Can't Get This Stuff No More"	5:15
2.	"Me Wise Magic"	6:08

Tokyo Dome: Live in Concert (June 21, 2013) was also included in the digital set, even though it was released in 2015 and featured Wolfgang Van Halen on bass, instead of Michael Anthony.

== Personnel ==
- David Lee Roth – vocals, backing vocals, guitars
- Edward Van Halen – guitars, keyboards, backing vocals,
- Alex Van Halen – drums
- Michael Anthony – bass, backing vocals
