= Video Hits Volume I =

Video by Van Halen
- Released: 1996
- Recorded: 1984–1996
- Genre: Hard rock; heavy metal; glam metal
- Length: 65:00
- Label: Warner Bros.

Van Halen chronology
Live: Right Here, Right Now (1993)	Video Hits Volume I (1996)

Professional ratings
Review scores
Source	Rating
AllMusic	3/5 stars

Video Hits Volume I is a video album by American hard rock band Van Halen, released by Warner Bros. Records in 1996. The video compiles a selection of the band's music videos from 1984 to 1996. The DVD version, released in November 1999, includes the music video for the 1998 single "Without You".

== Track listing ==
All tracks are written by Edward Van Halen, Alex Van Halen, Sammy Hagar, and Michael Anthony, except where noted.

No.	Title	Writer(s)	Original album	Length
1.	"Jump"	E. Van Halen; A. Van Halen; David Lee Roth; Anthony	1984 (1984)
2.	"Panama"	E. Van Halen; A. Van Halen; Roth; Anthony	1984
3.	"Hot for Teacher"	E. Van Halen; A. Van Halen; Roth; Anthony	1984
4.	"When It's Love"		OU812 (1988)
5.	"Finish What Ya Started"		OU812
6.	"Poundcake"		For Unlawful Carnal Knowledge (1991)
7.	"Runaround"		For Unlawful Carnal Knowledge
8.	"Right Now"		For Unlawful Carnal Knowledge
9.	"Dreams"		5150 (1986)
10.	"Don't Tell Me (What Love Can Do)"		Balance (1995)
11.	"Can't Stop Lovin' You"		Balance
12.	"Not Enough"		Balance
13.	"Humans Being"		Twister soundtrack (1996)

DVD bonus track
No.	Title	Writer(s)	Original album	Length
14.	"Without You"	E. Van Halen; A. Van Halen; Anthony; Gary Cherone	Van Halen III (1998)

== Certifications ==
Region	Certification	Certified units/sales
Australia (ARIA)	Platinum	15,000^{^}
United States (RIAA)	Gold	50,000^{^}
^{^} Shipments figures based on certification alone.
