= 5150 Tour =

1986 concert tour by Van Halen

- Tour by Van Halen
- Poster to the concert in Toronto, Canada
- Location: North America
- Associated album: 5150
- Start date: March 27, 1986
- End date: November 3, 1986
- Legs: 3
- No. of shows: 111

Van Halen concert chronology
- 1984 Tour (1984); 5150 Tour (1986); OU812 Tour (1988–1989)

The 5150 Tour was a concert tour by the American hard rock band Van Halen in support of their seventh studio album, 5150.

== Background ==
This was the band's first tour with Sammy Hagar on lead vocals (and second electric guitar), following the acrimonious departure of original singer David Lee Roth.

Like many Van Halen tours, the routing took the band across North America only, as traveling internationally was hard for the band's complicated and heavy stage set. Furthermore, Hagar wanted to establish himself as the new singer in their homeland. The first leg of the tour was entirely United States dates, though Canadian ones slipped into the second and third legs.

The tour took place in the aftermath of the David Lee Roth-Van Halen split, with the fanbase being split too. Those who had joined the new Van Halen's side used the concerts as an opportunity to voice their stance, frequently via unison chants of "Fuck Dave!" The tour set a trend later Hagar-era ones would follow: the number of pre-Hagar Van Halen songs was kept to a minimum, with the singer willing only to play that era's best-known songs. An Eddie Van Halen/Hagar guitar duel was also a usual part of the concerts. "Rock and Roll" by Led Zeppelin was the closing song every night. Canadian rock legends Bachman–Turner Overdrive, Loverboy and Kim Mitchell were support acts on many of the outdoor stadium gigs in North America.

The tour was supposed to start with dates in Hawaii and Alaska, but they were cancelled at the last minute, due to the band finishing the mixing of the album.

The group's biggest hit, "Jump", was usually omitted from the set list, or sung by the audience instead of Hagar. Almost all the songs from 5150 were played, as well as covers and some of Hagar's pre-Van Halen work. The latter included his recent MTV hit "I Can't Drive 55" and Montrose songs. The addition of Hagar's guitar gave Eddie Van Halen more room to move, or to play keyboards on certain songs.

The tour was a major high for the band, albeit with a couple of low points. The first was when their new manager Ed Leffler was hospitalized in Texas after an altercation in a hotel elevator. The second was when Eddie's wife Valerie Bertinelli suffered a miscarriage; she didn't reveal to Eddie that she was pregnant at the time, until it was too late.

"We were selling records faster than they could print them and we were selling out every show," recalled Hagar. "We felt invincible."

The second concert at New Haven Coliseum was filmed and shown live on television and released on VHS as Live Without a Net; it has subsequently been released on DVD.

Before the last show of the tour on November 3, 1986 at the Cow Palace, Eddie cut his hair into a braided rat tail, while Alex shaved his head bald. The story was that supposedly at the end of the tour, everyone would have their heads shaved (Sammy chose not to for maintaining his look for a photo shoot soon to come, Michael chose not to in fear of not knowing how long it would take to grow back as his hair was thinning at the time.

== Reception ==
Moira McCormick from Billboard who attended the Chicago performance at Rosemont Horizon, gave the performance a positive review. She opened her review stating that the band's concert that night was further testimony to the band's previous success with both David Lee Roth and the popularity of the guitarist Eddie Van Halen who she claimed can triumph in speed contests and praised him for performing with "incredible finesse". Regarding the vocalist Sammy Hagar, she said that the audience had welcomed him as the band's lead singer, being supportive of his vocal work especially on the band's older material. She concluded her review, stating that the band was still one of America's leading rock forces, judging by the record sales and audience reactions.

== Tour dates ==
List of concerts, showing date, city, country and venue
Date	City	Country	Venue
March 27, 1986	Shreveport	United States	Hirsch Memorial Coliseum
March 28, 1986	Little Rock	United States	Barton Coliseum
March 29, 1986	Memphis	United States	Mid-South Coliseum
March 31, 1986	Birmingham	United States	Birmingham-Jefferson Civic Center
April 1, 1986	Huntsville	United States	Von Braun Civic Center
April 3, 1986	Jackson	United States	Mississippi Coliseum
April 4, 1986	Baton Rouge	United States	Riverside Centroplex
April 5, 1986	Biloxi	United States	Mississippi Coast Coliseum
April 7, 1986	Pembroke Pines	United States	Hollywood Sportatorium
April 8, 1986	North Fort Myers	United States	Lee County Civic Center
April 10, 1986	Lakeland	United States	Lakeland Civic Center
April 11, 1986	Lakeland	United States	Lakeland Civic Center
April 12, 1986	Jacksonville	United States	Jacksonville Coliseum
April 14, 1986	Atlanta	United States	Omni Coliseum
April 16, 1986	Columbia	United States	Carolina Coliseum
April 18, 1986	Louisville	United States	Freedom Hall
April 19, 1986	Evansville	United States	Roberts Municipal Stadium
April 20, 1986	Nashville	United States	Nashville Municipal Auditorium
April 22, 1986	Rosemont	United States	Rosemont Horizon
April 23, 1986	Rosemont	United States	Rosemont Horizon
April 24, 1986	Rockford	United States	Rockford MetroCentre
April 26, 1986	Carbondale	United States	SIU Arena
April 27, 1986	Peoria	United States	Peoria Civic Center
April 29, 1986	Saint Paul	United States	St. Paul Civic Center
April 30, 1986	Cedar Rapids	United States	Five Seasons Center
May 2, 1986	Fort Wayne	United States	Allen County War Memorial Coliseum
May 3, 1986	Indianapolis	United States	Market Square Arena
May 6, 1986	Cincinnati	United States	Cincinnati Gardens
May 7, 1986	Cincinnati	United States	Cincinnati Gardens
May 9, 1986	Detroit	United States	Joe Louis Arena
May 10, 1986	Detroit	United States	Joe Louis Arena
May 11, 1986	Detroit	United States	Joe Louis Arena
May 13, 1986	Pittsburgh	United States	Civic Arena
May 14, 1986	Charleston	United States	Charleston Civic Center
May 16, 1986	Greensboro	United States	Greensboro Coliseum
May 17, 1986	Hampton	United States	Hampton Coliseum
May 18, 1986	Roanoke	United States	Roanoke Civic Center
May 20, 1986	Atlanta	United States	Omni Coliseum
May 21, 1986	Knoxville	United States	Knoxville Civic Coliseum
May 23, 1986	East Troy	United States	Alpine Valley Music Theatre
May 24, 1986	East Troy	United States	Alpine Valley Music Theatre
May 26, 1986	Des Moines	United States	Veterans Memorial Auditorium
May 27, 1986	Omaha	United States	Omaha Civic Auditorium
May 28, 1986	Valley Center	United States	Kansas Coliseum
May 30, 1986	Kansas City	United States	Kemper Arena
May 31, 1986	Kansas City	United States	Kemper Arena
June 2, 1986	Indianapolis	United States	Market Square Arena
June 28, 1986	San Diego	United States	San Diego Sports Arena
June 29, 1986	San Diego	United States	San Diego Sports Arena
July 2, 1986	Inglewood	United States	The Forum
July 3, 1986	Inglewood	United States	The Forum
July 5, 1986	Inglewood	United States	The Forum
July 8, 1986	Chandler	United States	Compton Terrace
July 10, 1986	Las Vegas	United States	Thomas & Mack Center
July 12, 1986	Boulder	United States	Folsom Field (Colorado Sun-Day)
July 14, 1986	Albuquerque	United States	Tingley Coliseum
July 16, 1986	Oklahoma City	United States	Myriad Convention Center
July 19, 1986	Dallas	United States	Cotton Bowl (Texxas Jam)
July 21, 1986	St. Louis	United States	St. Louis Arena
July 22, 1986	St. Louis	United States	St. Louis Arena
July 23, 1986	St. Louis	United States	St. Louis Arena
July 25, 1986	Richfield	United States	Richfield Coliseum
July 26, 1986	Richfield	United States	Richfield Coliseum
July 28, 1986	East Rutherford	United States	Brendan Byrne Arena
July 29, 1986	East Rutherford	United States	Brendan Byrne Arena
July 31, 1986	East Rutherford	United States	Brendan Byrne Arena
August 1, 1986	East Rutherford	United States	Brendan Byrne Arena
August 2, 1986	Uniondale	United States	Nassau Coliseum
August 4, 1986	Philadelphia	United States	Spectrum
August 5, 1986	Philadelphia	United States	Spectrum
August 6, 1986	Philadelphia	United States	Spectrum
August 8, 1986	Landover	United States	Capital Centre
August 9, 1986	Landover	United States	Capital Centre
August 11, 1986	Worcester	United States	Worcester Centrum
August 12, 1986	Worcester	United States	Worcester Centrum
August 14, 1986	Worcester	United States	Worcester Centrum
August 15, 1986	Worcester	United States	Worcester Centrum
August 18, 1986	Toronto	Canada	CNE Grandstand
August 20, 1986	Montreal	Canada	Montreal Forum
August 22, 1986	Providence	United States	Providence Civic Center
August 23, 1986	Portland	United States	Cumberland County Civic Center
August 24, 1986	Portland	United States	Cumberland County Civic Center
August 26, 1986	New Haven	United States	New Haven Coliseum (Live Without a Net)
August 27, 1986	New Haven	United States	New Haven Coliseum (Live Without a Net)
August 29, 1986	Niagara Falls	United States	Niagara Falls Convention and Civic Center
August 30, 1986	Niagara Falls	United States	Niagara Falls Convention and Civic Center
September 1, 1986	Rochester	United States	Silver Stadium
September 27, 1986	Lafayette	United States	Cajundome
September 29, 1986	Houston	United States	The Summit
September 30, 1986	Fort Worth	United States	Tarrant County Convention Center Arena
October 1, 1986	Fort Worth	United States	Tarrant County Convention Center Arena
October 3, 1986	San Antonio	United States	San Antonio Convention Center Arena
October 4, 1986	Austin	United States	Frank Erwin Center
October 6, 1986	Las Cruces	United States	Pan American Center
October 8, 1986	Salt Lake City	United States	Salt Palace
October 10, 1986	Casper	United States	Casper Events Center
October 11, 1986	Rapid City	United States	Don Barnett Arena
October 14, 1986	Billings	United States	Yellowstone Metra
October 16, 1986	Pullman	United States	Beasley Coliseum
October 18, 1986	Pocatello	United States	Minidome
October 19, 1986	Boise	United States	BSU Pavilion
October 21, 1986	Seattle	United States	Seattle Center Coliseum
October 22, 1986	Seattle	United States	Seattle Center Coliseum
October 23, 1986	Vancouver	Canada	BC Place
October 25, 1986	Portland	United States	Memorial Coliseum
October 26, 1986	Portland	United States	Memorial Coliseum
October 29, 1986	Reno	United States	Lawlor Events Center
October 31, 1986	Daly City	United States	Cow Palace
November 1, 1986	Daly City	United States	Cow Palace
November 2, 1986	Daly City	United States	Cow Palace
November 3, 1986	Daly City	United States	Cow Palace

=== Box office score data ===
List of box office score data with date, city, venue, attendance, gross, references
Date (1986)	City	Venue	Attendance	Gross	Ref(s)
April 18	Louisville, United States	Freedom Hall	10,616	$149,640	
April 19	Evansville, United States	Roberts Stadium	10,953	$158,818	
April 20	Nashville, United States	Municipal Auditorium	9,900	$148,500	
May 13	Pittsburgh, United States	Civic Arena	15,899	$235,265	
June 28–29	San Diego, United States	Sports Arena	23,825	$355,260	
July 28–August 1	East Rutherford, United States	Meadowlands Arena	78,172	$1,284,659	
September 27	Lafayette, United States	Cajundome	9,434	$135,360	
September 29	Houston, United States	The Summit	13,977	$220,137	
September 30–October 1	Fort Worth, United States	Tarrant County Convention Center	20,170	$302,550	
October 25–26	Portland, United States	Memorial Coliseum Complex	20,412	$326,592	
October 29	Reno, United States	Lawlor Events Center	9,581	$158,087	
October 31–November 3	San Francisco, United States	Cow Palace	57,270	$950,745	

== Personnel ==
- Eddie Van Halen – guitar, backing vocals, lead keyboards
- Michael Anthony – bass, backing vocals, keyboards
- Alex Van Halen – drums
- Sammy Hagar – lead vocals, guitar
