= Rick Valente =

American bodybuilder

Rick D. Valente
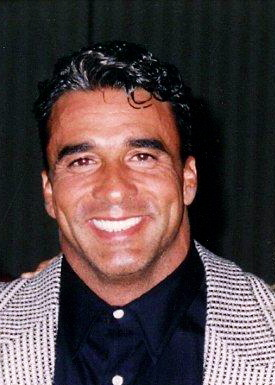
- Born: July 11, 1958 (age 68); New Haven, Connecticut, U.S.
- Occupations: Personal trainer, bodybuilder, and television personality
- Years active: 1983–present
- Known for: Mr. Los Angeles 1983
- Television: BodyShaping on ESPN

Rick Valente (born 11 July 1958) is an American former competitive bodybuilder and host of the ESPN television show BodyShaping. He was the winner of the 1983 Mr. Los Angeles competition.

== Early life ==
Valente was born in New Haven, Connecticut on July 11, 1958. He trained in karate at the West Haven Academy of Karate as a child and the West Haven Assembly of the Martial Arts Academy as a teenager. After graduating from high school, Valente moved to Florida to work as a lifeguard and nightclub bouncer. At 19, he won an amateur bodybuilding competition at the nightclub he worked at, Summer's Night Club in Fort Lauderdale.

== Bodybuilding and fitness career ==
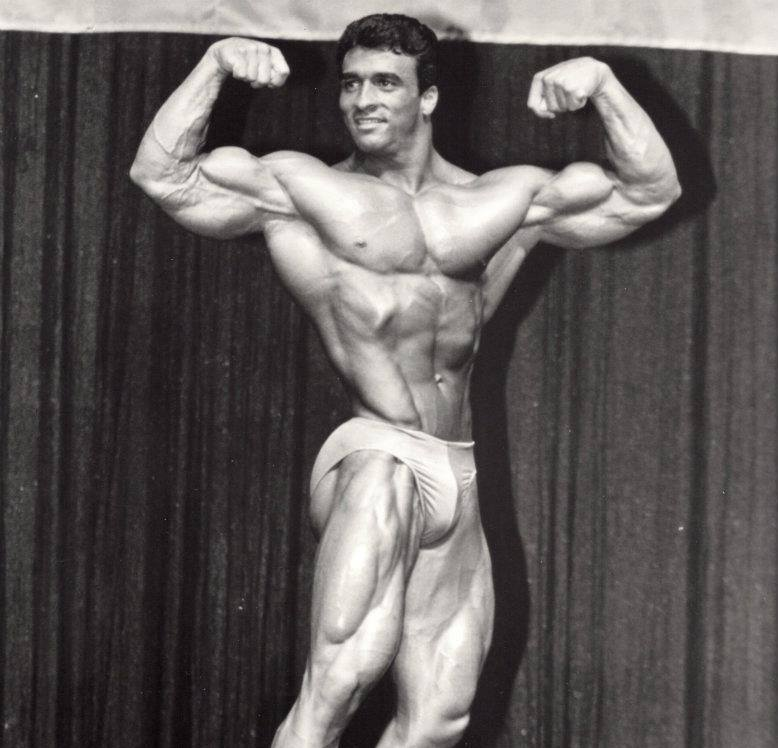
Valente performing in the 1980s

Valente began his bodybuilding career and went on to win the Mr. Gold Coast competition in the middleweight division, come in second at the Mr. Golden Glades competition, and placed third in the Mr. Florida competition in the light heavyweight division. In 1983, Valente won the Tall Class of the NPC Mr. Los Angeles Contest and was on the cover of Flex Magazine.

He has also worked as a personal trainer at a gym, with clients including Gregory Hines, Sally Field, Jeff Goldblum, Chuck Woolery, Jermaine Jackson, Dennis Alexio, and Chuck Arnoldi. In 1984, Valente was the winner of the Mr. Los Angeles competition. He also placed second in that year's Mr. California competition. His bodybuilding career was cut short in August 1987 when he suffered a third degree pectoral tear. He has since continued his personal trainer business at Gold's.

== Television and print ==
In 1987, Valente was featured in a national advertising campaign for LA Gear, which featured him soon after his Mr. Los Angeles title. Valente became known as the "Bruce Jenner" of bodybuilding. Valente was a sports fitness model for a range of media including magazines like Muscle & Fitness, Flex Magazine, MuscleMag International, and Powerhouse; national television commercials; and the album cover for Van Halen's 5150, where he posed as Atlas lifting a globe on his shoulders with the Van Halen symbol on it. Overall, he was featured in 41 commercials and 40 covers for magazines or books.

In 1989, Valente auditioned for and received the hosting position for the television show BodyShaping on ESPN, appearing twice a day five days per week and often hosting from global locations. The show filmed 75 episodes at a time, including specials featuring P.E.T.A, Special Olympics, and the Playboy Mansion. Valente hosted the show throughout the 1990s and into the early 2000s, and at its height had more than three million viewers daily in over 90 countries where an additional 60 million viewers tuned in. He has also appeared on ABC, N1BC, ESPN, CNN and MTV, and is the spokesperson for Ferrara Bakery and Café.
