= Van Halen (album) =

Studio album by Van Halen
- Released: February 10, 1978
- Recorded: August 29 – October 4, 1977
- Studios: Sunset Sound Recorders, Hollywood
- Genres: Hard rock; heavy metal
- Length: 35:34
- Label: Warner Bros.
- Producer: Ted Templeman

Van Halen chronology
Van Halen (1978)	Van Halen II (1979)

Singles from Van Halen
- 1. "You Really Got Me" Released: January 1978; 2. "Runnin' with the Devil" Released: April 1978; 3. "Ain't Talkin' 'bout Love" Released: June 1978 (Japan); 4. "Jamie's Cryin'" Released: July 1978; 5. "On Fire" Released: September 1978 (Japan)

Van Halen is the debut studio album by American rock band Van Halen, released on February 10, 1978, by Warner Bros. Records. Widely regarded as one of the greatest debut albums in rock music, the album was a major commercial success, peaking at number 19 on the Billboard Top LPs & Tape chart. It has sold more than 10 million copies in the United States, receiving a Diamond certification from the Recording Industry Association of America (RIAA) and making it one of the best-selling albums in the country.

Van Halen contains some of the band's most well-known songs, including "Runnin' with the Devil", "Ain't Talkin' 'bout Love", "Jamie's Cryin'", their cover version of the Kinks' 1964 song "You Really Got Me", and the instrumental "Eruption"; written and performed by guitarist Eddie Van Halen, it is widely regarded as one of the greatest guitar solos of all time and helped popularize two-handed tapping. In 2020, the album was ranked number 292 in Rolling Stone's list of the "500 Greatest Albums of All Time".

== Background ==
Van Halen recorded demos of 10 songs in November 1976 during sessions at Village Recorders in West L.A. and New York’s Electric Lady studios, produced and financed by Gene Simmons of Kiss. However, the resulting three-track demo tape attracted little interest from record labels, and Kiss’s manager Bill Aucoin even declined to manage the band. Guitarist Eddie Van Halen was not convinced of the quality of the material because they could not make the recordings with their own equipment. Simmons left to tour with Kiss after recording the demos, but said he would try to secure Van Halen a record deal afterwards.

After recording the demos, the band was offered several concerts. At a sold-out show in their hometown, Pasadena, the group's future manager, Marshall Berle, discovered the band. He and musical entrepreneur Kim Fowley paired them with punk rock band Venus and the Razorblades for a gig at the Whisky a Go Go. After being well received by Berle at the Whisky a Go Go, the band gained the attention of Mo Ostin and Ted Templeman of Warner Bros. who both attended the band's performance at the Starwood on February 3, 1977. Van Halen proceeded to sign a contract with Warner.

The recording of this debut album with producer Ted Templeman began August 29, 1977. The tracks were recorded quickly during sessions between August 31 and September 8, 1977. It was mostly recorded live, but "Runnin' with the Devil", "Jamie's Cryin'", "Feel Your Love Tonight" and "Ice Cream Man" contain guitar overdubs. Eddie also overdubbed his solo for "Ain't Talkin' 'bout Love" with an electric sitar. Work on the album ended October 4 with the final mixing of "Little Dreamer" and "Eruption" (titled simply "Guitar Solo" on studio documents). Overall, the album cost approximately $54,000 to produce.

"We didn't have a ton of material," recalled bassist Michael Anthony, "so we basically just took our live show and all the songs we knew and went for it. The whole album only took a couple of weeks. Ted Templeman wanted to make a big, powerful guitar record, and he had all he needed in what Eddie was doing." Jenna Scaramanga of Guitar World wrote, "Van Halen didn’t have much in common with The Clash or the Sex Pistols, but the Californians’ brand of ‘Atomic Punk’ had the same urgency as the London punks."

The subsequent tour began March 3, 1978 at the Aragon Ballroom in Chicago with the band opening for Journey and Ronnie Montrose in the United States. They later opened for heavy metal band Black Sabbath in Europe and the United States.

== Packaging and artwork ==
The cover photos for Van Halen were taken at the Whisky a Go Go, a Los Angeles club at which Van Halen often performed during late 1976-1977. The guitar pictured on the cover is Eddie Van Halen's signature Frankenstrat (before he added the red paint), a highly customized Stratocaster-style guitar built out of replacement parts.

The liner notes thank radio disc jockey Rodney Bingenheimer and Kiss bassist Gene Simmons, the latter usually credited with discovering Van Halen although Bingenheimer deserves credit for introducing Van Halen to Simmons. "A lot of people stick me on their [thanks list], even though I don't deserve it," Simmons remarked. "One that I did deserve to be on was that first Van Halen record – the guys still owe me a couple thousand bucks! But I love 'em."

== Release and reception ==
Retrospective professional reviews
Review scores
Source	Rating
AllMusic	5/5 stars
Christgau's Record Guide	C
Classic Rock	5/5 stars
MusicHound Rock	5/5
Q	5/5 stars
Rolling Stone	5/5 stars
The Rolling Stone Album Guide	4/5 stars

Van Halen has received universal acclaim. In the United States, Van Halen reached number 19 on the Billboard 200; their debut single, a cover of The Kinks' "You Really Got Me", spent eleven weeks, three of which in the Top 40, on the Billboard Hot 100, peaking at number 36.

Soon after its February 1978 release, Van Halen became regarded by fans and critics as one of rock music’s greatest debut albums; however, its initial critical reception was mostly negative. In 1978, Rolling Stone critic Charles M. Young predicted, "In three years, Van Halen is going to be fat and self-indulgent and disgusting ... follow[ing] Deep Purple and Led Zeppelin right into the toilet. In the meantime, they are likely to be a big deal." But he also wrote that: "Van Halen's secret is not doing anything that's original while having the hormones to do it better than all those bands who have become fat and self-indulgent and disgusting. Edward Van Halen has mastered the art of lead/rhythm guitar in the tradition of Jimmy Page and Joe Walsh; several riffs on this record beat anything Aerosmith has come up with in years. Vocalist Dave Lee Roth manages the rare hard-rock feat of infusing the largely forgettable lyrics with energy and not sounding like a castrato at the same time. Drummer Alex Van Halen and bassist Michael Anthony are competent and properly unobtrusive." Village Voice critic Robert Christgau said, "For some reason Warners wants us to know that this is the biggest bar band in the San Fernando Valley ... The term becomes honorific when the music belongs in a bar. This music belongs on an aircraft carrier."

According to Rolling Stone's Holly George-Warren, with the album's release the mainstream media focused on Roth's "swaggering good looks and extroverted persona", while fans and musicians "were riveted by Eddie Van Halen's guitar mastery", which included "an array of unorthodox techniques." She notes that, even before the band's debut, "Eddie became a legend among local guitarists."

Kerrang! magazine gave the album a very positive review, and considers the album to be an "essential purchase." They wrote, "IT'S DIFFICULT to overstate the effect VH's debut had upon its release. With the music world split between punk, disco and prog rock, Van Halen combined a dazzling live show with a party-hearty motto and, in Eddie Van Halen, a guitarist who redefined what was possible on six strings. His sound on this album—christened 'The Brown Sound'—remains the holy grail of guitar tones."

Record World called the single "Jamie's Crying" a "driving rhythm piece, which may be [Van Halen's] most interesting single to date." saying that "its rock energy never lets up."

== Commercial performance ==
On August 7, 1996, Van Halen was re-certified by the RIAA for selling ten million copies in the United States alone. One of only seven rock bands to release two RIAA Diamond status albums, Van Halen remains one of Van Halen's two best-selling albums, along with 1984.

Van Halen went to Gold status on May 24, 1978, and then went to Platinum status just a few months later, on October 10, 1978. In less than a year the album sold more than one million copies in the US alone, meaning that the album was already a great success. On October 22, 1984, the album went to 5× Multi-Platinum status. The album went to 6x Multi-Platinum on February 1, 1989, and then went to 7× Multi-Platinum on September 29, 1993. In less than a year later, on July 11, 1994, the album went to 8x Multi-Platinum, and finally, on August 7, 1996, just two years later, the album went to Diamond status by RIAA.

The Van Halen album, like Van Halen's other David Lee Roth-era albums—excepting Van Halen II, which was re-certified in 2004, to coincide with the promotion of a Warner Bros. Records greatest hits collection—was last brought by Warner Bros. Records to the RIAA for re-certification in 1996, while 1984 was re-certified on February 8, 1999. Despite lack of re-certification, Van Halen's 1978 debut has continued to sell prolifically, re-appearing numerous times on Billboard's Top LPs & Tape and Top Pop Catalog Albums charts, as recently as 2020.

== Legacy ==
AllMusic's Stephen Thomas Erlewine described Van Halen as "monumental" and "seismic", while noting that it is typically not viewed as an "epochal generation shift" in the same way as the debut albums of Led Zeppelin, the Ramones, The Rolling Stones, and the Sex Pistols. He explains, "The reason it's never given the same due is that there's no pretension, nothing self-conscious about it." He commented: "The still-amazing thing about Van Halen is how it sounds like it has no fathers ... Like all great originals Van Halen doesn't seem to belong to the past and it still sounds like little else, despite generations of copycats." In Erlewine's opinion, the album "set the template for how rock and roll sounded for the next decade or more." A retrospective review by Q noted, "Hit singles came later, but this dazzling debut remains their trump card."

The album has been called the progenitor of glam metal. Jenna Scaramanga of Guitar World wrote, "The date on the sleeve says 1978, but a cursory listen to Van Halen’s debut tells you that it is, by some distance, the greatest guitar album of the 1980s. [...] Listening to it is a joyful experience, and that love of music gave meaning to every note they played."

In 1994, Van Halen was ranked number eight in Colin Larkin's Top 50 Heavy Metal Albums. Larkin described it as "one of the truly great" debut albums of heavy metal. According to authors Gary Graff and Daniel Durchholz, writing in MusicHound Rock: The Essential Album Guide (1999), Van Halen is a "headbanger's paradise"; before its release, "no one had heard or seen anything like it." In 2003, Rolling Stone, listed it among The 500 Greatest Albums of All Time, at number 410; the list's 2012 edition had it ranked 415th. The 2020 list placed it at 292. According to Rolling Stone's Joe Levy, the album "gave the world a new guitar hero and charismatic frontman" in Eddie Van Halen and David Lee Roth, respectively. Levy credits the tracks "Runnin' with the Devil" and "Ain't Talkin' 'Bout Love" with "put[ting] the swagger back in hard rock", praising Eddie Van Halen's "jaw-dropping technique", which "raised the bar for rock guitar." In 2013, Rolling Stone listed the album at number 27 of the 100 Best Debut Albums of All Time. In 2024, Loudwire staff elected it as the best hard rock album of 1978.

On April 15, 2013, David Lee Roth was interviewed by Jay Mohr for his podcast, where he selected the album as his favorite Van Halen recording.

In 2021, Classic Rock Magazine wrote: "Just when everyone thought the guitar had no further surprises to offer. Just when the metal world was settling down to a comfortable, predictable period… along came a hot-blooded, arrogantly souped-up gang from California, ready to turn heads, twist reputations, and bring us all to new heights of ecstasy. [...] Perhaps the closest we’ll ever get to a metal sex machine, this album was an overpowering torrent of testosterone."

In 2023, Matt Mitchell of Paste Magazine wrote: "It can be easy to underscore the importance of Van Halen’s eponymous debut record, given that they were never the most primitive or marquee name working in rock ‘n’ roll. But, Van Halen is, to say the least, a perfect album packed to the brim with some of the most exciting and energetic rock tunes post-Beatles break-up. [...] Without Van Halen, glam and hair metal wouldn’t exist the way it does today—there would be no Appetite For Destruction or foil to mainstream pop. There’s an unquantifiable, daring magic here, and it’s what has made Van Halen a household name for nearly 50 years."

== Track listing ==
All tracks are written by Van Halen, except where noted.

Side one
No.	Title	Writer(s)	Length
1.	"Runnin' with the Devil"		3:36
2.	"Eruption"		1:42
3.	"You Really Got Me" (The Kinks cover)	Ray Davies	2:38
4.	"Ain't Talkin' 'bout Love"		3:50
5.	"I'm the One"		3:47

Side two
No.	Title	Writer(s)	Length
6.	"Jamie's Cryin'"		3:31
7.	"Atomic Punk"		3:02
8.	"Feel Your Love Tonight"		3:43
9.	"Little Dreamer"		3:23
10.	"Ice Cream Man" (John Brim cover)	John Brim	3:20
11.	"On Fire"		3:01

== Personnel ==
=== Van Halen ===
- David Lee Roth (credited as "David Roth") – vocals, acoustic guitar on "Ice Cream Man"
- Eddie Van Halen (credited as "Edward Van Halen") – guitar, backing vocals, electric sitar on "Ain't Talkin' 'bout Love"
- Michael Anthony – bass guitar, backing vocals
- Alex Van Halen – drums

=== Production ===
- Ted Templeman – producer
- Donn Landee – engineer
- Peggy McCreary – second engineer
- Kent Nebergall – second engineer
- Dave Bhang – art direction & design
- Elliot Gilbert – photography

== Charts ==
=== Weekly charts ===
Chart (1978)	Peak position
Australian Albums (Kent Music Report)	17
Canada Top Albums/CDs (RPM)	18
Dutch Albums (Album Top 100)	36
Japanese Albums (Oricon)	44
New Zealand Albums (RMNZ)	22
UK Albums (Official Charts)	34
US Billboard 200	19

Chart (1980)	Peak position
Dutch Albums (Album Top 100)	10

Chart (2011)	Peak position
Italian Albums (FIMI)	89

Chart (2020)	Peak position
US Top Rock Albums (Billboard)	4

=== Year-end charts ===
Chart (1978)	Position
US Billboard 200	33

Chart (1979)	Peak position
US Billboard 200	15

Chart (2020)	Peak position
US Top Rock Albums (Billboard)	88

== Certifications ==
Certifications for Van Halen
Region	Certification	Certified units/sales
Australia (ARIA)	Gold	20,000^{^}
Canada (Music Canada)	4× Platinum	400,000^{^}
Finland (Musiikkituottajat)	Gold	25,305
France (SNEP)	Gold	100,000^{*}
Germany (BVMI)	Gold	250,000^{^}
Japan (RIAJ)	Gold	100,000^{^}
Netherlands (NVPI)	Gold	50,000^{^}
United Kingdom (BPI)	Gold	100,000^{^}
United States (RIAA)	Diamond	10,000,000^{^}
^{*} Sales figures based on certification alone.^{^} Shipments figures based on certification alone.

== See also ==
- Van Halen discography
