= Little Guitars =

Song by Van Halen

from the album Diver Down
- Released: April 14, 1982
- Recorded: 1982
- Genre: Hard rock
- Length: 4:33
- Label: Warner Bros.
- Songwriter: Michael Anthony / David Lee Roth / Alex Van Halen / Eddie Van Halen
- Producer: Ted Templeman

"Little Guitars" is a song performed by Van Halen. It was included on their album Diver Down. The song's intro is included when played on radio. Despite it never being released as a commercial single, the song reached #33 on the US Album Rock Tracks chart in 1982.

The song is notable for its intro, an acoustic flamenco-style solo by Eddie Van Halen. This was accomplished by using his right hand to pick a single-note trill on the high E string. He then used his left hand to play the melody on the low E, A, and D strings using hammer-ons and pull-offs.

"Everyone thinks I overdubbed on that. Then I show them how I did it. Classical guitarists can do that, but they finger-pick. I can't finger-pick. No, I definitely cheated. I'm good at that. If there's a sound in my head and I want it, I'll find a way to do it. I bought a couple Montoya records. I actually tried to finger-pick, and I'm going, 'Screw this, it's too hard.'" – Eddie Van Halen

Eddie Van Halen with the custom mini-Les Paul in 1984.

In addition to the intro, the song is also notable for the mini-Les Paul guitar (the so-called "little guitar") that Edward used for the main track. This is the only Van Halen recording that the guitar was used for. The mini-Les Paul was made by Nashville luthier David Petschulat, and was pitched and sold to Eddie during a tour stop in Nashville, Tennessee. Eddie purchased a second mini-LP guitar that was then built to slightly different specs; the first being a honey-sunburst with mini-humbuckers, and the second being dark wine-red with a thicker body and full-size humbuckers.

"And the song is titled this because its played on a copy of a Les Paul three inches longer than your forearm to the tip of your finger so you could put the whole thing in your pocket if you wanted to. It makes a very distinctive sound- different from your traditional rock axe. I got the idea for the song from the acoustic part. It sounded Mexican to me, so I wrote a song for a Señorita." – David Lee Roth

Chuck Klosterman of Vulture.com ranked it the 18th-best Van Halen song, writing "Nothing is heavy, everything is edifying — a comprehensive success."
