= Dreams (Van Halen song) =

Single by Van Halen

from the album 5150
- B-side: "Inside"
- Released: May 1986
- Recorded: 1985–1986
- Studio: 5150 Studios, Studio City, California
- Genre: Synth rock; hard rock; pop metal
- Length: 4:20 (7" promo); 4:53 (7" single/album); 5:07 (12")
- Label: Warner Bros.
- Songwriters: Michael Anthony; Sammy Hagar; Alex Van Halen; Eddie Van Halen
- Producers: Van Halen; Mick Jones; Donn Landee

Van Halen singles chronology
"Why Can't This Be Love" (1986)	"Dreams" (1986)	"Love Walks In" (1986)

Music videos
- "Dreams" on YouTube

"Dreams" is a song by Van Halen released in May 1986, from their seventh studio album 5150. It was the second single from that album, and it reached # 22 on the Billboard Hot 100 as well as #24 on the Cash Box Top 100. Nine years after its original release, "Dreams" introduced the band to a new generation of fans when it appeared in Mighty Morphin Power Rangers: The Movie and on its soundtrack album.

== Background ==
"Dreams" was written during the Sammy Hagar era of the band. It was performed during most tours featuring Hagar, including the final Hagar reunion tour. Even the Gary Cherone–headed tour supporting Van Halen III featured the song in their set-list. The song was also used to close the 2004 Democratic National Convention, played after the acceptance speech of John Kerry. It was also used as the campaign's theme song at rallies across the country in 2004. During an interview with Hagar for Rolling Stone featuring questions from fans, Hagar said that "Dreams", along with "Right Now", were his favorite Van Halen songs, with "Dreams" being his most favorite if you pushed him. The song has also been redone by Hagar by his solo band, becoming a slower, more contemplative song, performed acoustically instead of the original album's faster-paced rock arrangement.

== Reception ==
Cash Box called it a "celebration of teen freedom" and said that "Hagar’s voice cuts loose and soars over the trademark Van Halen hard rock/ classic pop song as only Van Halen can put it down." Billboard said that "EVH's stinging guitar and Hagar's larynx abuse proclaim this item bona fide hard rock, despite a suspiciously cheerful pop bounce." In a 1998 article written by Rick Reger for the Chicago Tribune, "Dreams" was described negatively as being a, "flaccid piece of pop-metal".

The song was ranked #1 on Ultimate Classic Rock's list of the Top 10 Van Hagar Songs, and was described as a "soaring piece of pop magic".

== Arrangements ==
Eddie Van Halen played guitar and keyboards on the studio version of this song. During the 5150 Tour, he played the keyboards and switched to the guitar during the first solo, while Hagar played the rhythm parts before then. On later tours, he would play guitar only, while the keyboard was either played offstage by a hired performer (such as Alan Fitzgerald of Night Ranger during the For Unlawful Carnal Knowledge Tour), or prerecorded material was used.

During live performances, on the chorus "We'll get higher and higher, straight up we'll climb. Higher and higher, leave it all behind", bassist Michael Anthony usually sang the second "higher" in both parts. On the studio version, Sammy Hagar sings them both. This became a standard part of the song's live performances and Eddie Van Halen would also join in the singing.

Of the album version, producer Mick Jones said: "I was able to push Sammy to new heights – literally. He was singing so high that he was hyperventilating. He almost passed out."

== Music videos ==
There were three music videos made for the song. The most well known version was released in 1986 and featured the US Navy's Blue Angels performing a variety of aerial stunts with the A-4F Skyhawk. The other two videos were shot in March 1993 from a live performance at the Whisky a Go Go in West Hollywood, California, to celebrate the band's return to the venue after 15 years for promotion of the Live: Right Here, Right Now release. One version of the video features newscasters and interviews with fans lining up outside the venue before the performance. This version is available on Van Halen: Video Hits, Vol. 1. A second version features far less commentary and more focus on the performance itself.

== Charts ==
Chart (1986)	Peak position
Australia (Kent Music Report)	51
Canada Top Singles (RPM)	85
US Billboard Hot 100	22
US Cash Box Top 100	24
UK Singles Chart	62
US Top Rock Tracks (Billboard)	6
West Germany (Official German Charts)	53

== Personnel ==
- Eddie Van Halen – lead & rhythm guitar, synthesizer
- Alex Van Halen – drums
- Sammy Hagar – lead vocals
- Michael Anthony – bass, backing vocals
