= Best of Both Worlds (Van Halen song) =

1986 single by Van Halen

Single by Van Halen

from the album 5150
- B-side: "Best of Both Worlds (Live)"
- Released: October 1986
- Recorded: 1985–1986
- Genre: Hard rock
- Length: 3:58 (single version); 4:49 (album version)
- Songwriters: Sammy Hagar, Eddie Van Halen, Alex Van Halen, Michael Anthony

Van Halen singles chronology
"Love Walks In" (1986)	"Best of Both Worlds" (1986)	"Black and Blue" (1988)

"Best of Both Worlds" is a song by American rock band Van Halen on their album 5150 that was later released as a single in October 1986. A music video taken from the Live Without a Net concert video was in heavy rotation on MTV.

== Background ==
The song is about Sammy's optimistic look on Van Halen's future, and creating your own luck. Primarily a guitar-driven song, the second verse includes some synth pads to add texture to the sound.

== Reception ==
Cash Box said that "the guitar wizardry of Eddie Van Halen charges through the grooves of this song" and also praised Sammy Hagar's vocal performance. Billboard said it has a "strong pop hook and hedonist philosophy."

In 2011, the song was ranked at #5 on Ultimate Classic Rock's list of the Top 10 Van Hagar Songs. They also ranked the song as best song from 5150.

== Personnel ==
- Sammy Hagar — lead and backing vocals
- Eddie Van Halen — guitar, keyboards, backing vocals
- Michael Anthony — bass guitar, backing vocals
- Alex Van Halen — electronic drums

== Charts ==
Chart (1986)	Peak position
U.S. Billboard Mainstream Rock	12
