= Runnin' with the Devil =

Single by Van Halen

from the album Van Halen
- B-side: "Eruption"
- Released: April 1978
- Recorded: 1977
- Studio: Sunset Sound Recorders, Hollywood
- Genre: Hard rock
- Length: 3:34
- Label: Warner Bros.
- Songwriters: Michael Anthony; David Lee Roth; Alex Van Halen; Edward Van Halen
- Producer: Ted Templeman

Van Halen singles chronology
"You Really Got Me" (1978)	"Runnin' with the Devil" (1978)	"Jamie's Cryin'" (1978)

Music video
- "Runnin' with the Devil" on YouTube

"Runnin' with the Devil" is a song by the American hard rock band Van Halen, released as the second single from their eponymous debut album in April 1978. The lyrics were inspired by Ohio Players 1974 song "Runnin' from the Devil". In 2009, "Runnin' with the Devil" was named the 9th greatest hard rock song of all time by VH1. Chuck Klosterman of Vulture ranked it the eighth-best Van Halen song, praising the staccato bass playing as well as David Lee Roth's vocal performance.

"Runnin' with the Devil" remains a staple track of classic rock radio and Van Halen's discography. Alex Van Halen has stated that this song "best epitomizes why Eddie Van Halen was such a genius".

== Composition and lyrics ==
The song begins with a collection of car horns sounding. The horns were taken from the band's own cars and mounted in a box and powered by two car batteries, with a foot switch. Producer Ted Templeman slowed the horns down before adding them to the track. This same idea was first used during the band's club sets and appeared on the Gene Simmons-recorded demo of the song, as well as the song "House of Pain" which preceded it on the demo. A four-measure guitar solo is played after the second and third chorus. At some point in the song, singer David Lee Roth belts out "Yoww!"

Initial pressings of the Van Halen compilation Best Of, Vol.1 contained an alternate edit of "Runnin' with the Devil" where the verses, chorus and solos were arranged in a different order than that of the original album version. It was reported that this was accidental and subsequent pressings have replaced this version with the one found on Van Halen.

== Background ==
The song's lyrics have often been misinterpreted as being satanic, yet the band members have never revealed the full meaning of the song. It is usually interpreted as being about the life of a touring young band. The song's verses deal with an individual's experience, including learning that a "simple" lifestyle is not as simple as it appears. The lyrics "Runnin' with the devil" are usually interpreted as being a reference to freedom. In the song freedom is portrayed as a lack of social ties and living in the present. The song's meaning has also been interpreted as being an attempt to convince a person that the theme of a simple life is not wrong as it appears. Therefore, the lyrics of "Runnin' with the Devil" would not be serious.

== Reception ==
Cash Box said it has "driving guitar work, tough jaunty beat and excellent lead and backing vocals." Record World said that "The production is extremely hot, with a 'live' quality to it, and sets off the screaming guitars quite well." In March 2023, Rolling Stone ranked the song at number 68 on their "100 Greatest Heavy Metal Songs of All Time" list.

== Legacy ==
"Runnin' with the Devil" remains a staple of classic rock radio and is considered one of Van Halen's signature songs.

The song is featured in a scene of the 2000 film Little Nicky, in which Adam Sandler plays the son of the Devil.

In January 2016, Van Halen licensed the song for use in advertising for the first time, when Acura featured elements of it—including David Lee Roth's vocal ad-libs and Eddie Van Halen's guitar riffs—in a Super Bowl 50 commercial for the Acura NSX. Eddie Van Halen and his brother Alex Van Halen were reportedly fans of the NSX and approved the song's use, according to Acura's national advertising manager, Leila Cesario. The 30-second commercial, produced by ad agency MullenLowe, contains no dialogue, pairing Roth's isolated vocals with images of the car shot in red, white and blue to emphasize its U.S. manufacture.

== Personnel ==
=== Van Halen ===
- David Lee Roth – vocals
- Eddie Van Halen – guitar, backing vocals
- Michael Anthony – bass guitar, backing vocals
- Alex Van Halen – drums

== Charts ==
Chart (1978)	Peak position
US Billboard Hot 100	84

Chart (1980)	Peak position
Belgian VRT Top 30	11
Dutch Mega Charts	2
Dutch Top 40	8
UK Singles Chart	52

Chart (2020)	Peak position
US Hot Rock & Alternative Songs (Billboard)	14

1980 year-end chart	Position
Belgian VRT Top 30	76
Dutch Megacharts	30
Dutch Top 40	53
