= Donn Landee =

American record producer and recording engineer (1947–2026)

- Born: Donn Edward Landee; February 26, 1947; Los Angeles, California, U.S.
- Died: April 2026 (aged 79)
- Genres: Rock, film score
- Occupations: Record producer, recording engineer, composer
- Years active: 1967–1989; 2014–2026

Donn Edward Landee (February 26, 1947 – April 2026) was an American record producer and recording engineer. Much of his work as an engineer was done with producer Ted Templeman at Sunset Sound Recorders in Hollywood, Los Angeles, California. The pair worked with a wide variety of artists for Warner Bros. Records during the 1970s and 1980s, including Van Halen and The Doobie Brothers.

== Life and career ==
In the late 1960s Landee began working on recording sessions at TTG Studios on La Brea Avenue in Hollywood. The studio was owned by engineer Ami Hadani. The upstairs studio featured a custom vacuum tube console. Landee recorded "Sky Pilot" in this room for Eric Burdon and the Animals and created the 'phasing' effect used in the song. Landee then worked at Sunwest Studios as an engineer in 1968 and became the manager. He then moved to Warner Bros. Records' Amigo Studios working under Lee Herschberg; he gained a large number of music industry contacts. API studio recording desks designed by renowned audio engineer Bill Putnam and utilizing solid state microphone preamplifiers and mix systems were installed at Amigo Studios, Sunset Sound, and at United Western Recorders in Hollywood in the early 1970s.

In 1983, Landee helped Eddie Van Halen build his home studio, 5150 Studios, using a mixing desk he retrieved from United Western that was nearly identical to the one the band had been recording with at Sunset during the previous five years. He also worked with Eddie on some instrumental scores for The Seduction of Gina and The Wild Life.

Landee died in April 2026, at the age of 79.
