= Eruption (instrumental) =

1978 instrumental by Van Halen

Instrumental by Van Halen

from the album Van Halen
- A-side: "Runnin' with the Devil"
- Released: February 10, 1978
- Recorded: September 8, 1977
- Studio: Sunset Sound Recorders, Hollywood
- Genre: Instrumental rock; hard rock
- Length: 1:42
- Label: Warner Bros.
- Composers: Michael Anthony; David Lee Roth; Alex Van Halen; Edward Van Halen
- Producer: Ted Templeman

Music video
- "Eruption" on YouTube

"Eruption" is a guitar solo performed by Eddie Van Halen and the second track from Van Halen's self-titled 1978 debut album. It is widely regarded to be one of the greatest guitar solos of all time, having popularized tapping. It segues into a cover of the Kinks' "You Really Got Me", and the two songs are usually played together by radio stations and in concert. The song was later included as the B-side to the group's second single, "Runnin' with the Devil".

== Composition and recording ==
"Eruption" starts with a short accompanied intro with Alex Van Halen on drums and Michael Anthony on bass. The highlight of the solo is the use of two-handed tapping. "Eruption" was played on the Frankenstrat, with an MXR Phase 90, an Echoplex, a Univox echo unit and a 1968 Marshall 1959 Super Lead tube amp. The Sunset Sound studio reverb room was also used to add reverb. The Frankenstrat was tuned down a half-step. "Eruption" begins in the key of A flat and ends on an E flat note that is a twelfth fret, 6th string harmonic processed through a Univox EC-80 echo unit.

== Inspiration ==
The "Eruption" introduction is based on the "Let Me Swim" introduction by Cactus. After the intro, an E-flat major quotation of the "Etude No. 2" by Rodolphe Kreutzer is heard. The end section begins with a series of rapid two-handed tapping triads that have a classical like structure and eventually finishes with a repeated classical cadence followed by sound effects generated by a Univox EC-80 echo unit.

The piece that would later be named "Eruption" had existed as part of Van Halen's stage act at least as far back as 1975, when it featured no tapping. Although one-handed tapping (hammer-ons and pull-offs) was standard guitar technique, "Eruption" introduced two-handed tapping to the mainstream popular rock audience, and it was a popular soloing option throughout the 1980s.

Initially, "Eruption" was not considered as a track for the Van Halen album as it was just a guitar solo Eddie performed live in the clubs. But Ted Templeman overheard it in the studio as Eddie was rehearsing it for a club date at the Whisky a Go Go and decided to include it on the album. Eddie recalled, "I didn't even play it right. There's a mistake at the top end of it. To this day, whenever I hear it, I always think, 'Man, I could've played it better.'"

"Spanish Fly", an acoustic guitar solo on Van Halen II, can be viewed as a nylon-string version of "Eruption", expanding on similar techniques. Similarly, it was suggested by Templeman for inclusion on the album after he heard Eddie Van Halen playing a classical guitar. In March 2005, Q magazine placed "Eruption" at number 29 in its list of the 100 Greatest Guitar Tracks. "Eruption" has been named the 2nd greatest guitar solo by Guitar World magazine. Chuck Klosterman of Vulture.com named it the best Van Halen song, noting "if you love Van Halen, this is what you love, and you can listen to it a thousand times without diminishing returns."

== Legacy ==
In 2021, Classic Rock Magazine wrote: "Eruption showcased an Eddie solo that had every wannabe within reach of a fretboard throwing away the rule book."

== Personnel ==
- Eddie Van Halen – electric guitar
- Michael Anthony – bass guitar
- Alex Van Halen – drums

== Accolades ==
Publication	Country	Accolade	Year	Rank
Guitar World	United States	100 Greatest Guitar Solos	2009	2
Q	United Kingdom	100 Greatest Guitar Tracks	2005	29
Rolling Stone	United States	100 Greatest Guitar Tracks	2008	6
