= 5150 (album) =

Studio album by Van Halen
- Released: March 24, 1986
- Recorded: November 1985 – February 1986
- Studios: 5150 Studios, Studio City, California
- Genres: Hard rock; glam metal; pop rock; synth-pop
- Length: 43:16
- Label: Warner Bros.
- Producers: Mick Jones; Donn Landee; Van Halen

Van Halen chronology
1984 (1984)	5150 (1986)	OU812 (1988)

Singles from 5150
- 1. "Why Can't This Be Love" Released: March 1986; 2. "Dreams" Released: May 1986; 3. "Love Walks In" Released: July 28, 1986; 4. "Best of Both Worlds" Released: October 1986

5150 (pronounced "fifty-one-fifty") is the seventh studio album by American rock band Van Halen. It was released on March 24, 1986, by Warner Bros. Records and was the first of four albums to be recorded with lead singer Sammy Hagar, who replaced David Lee Roth. The album was named after Eddie Van Halen's home studio, 5150, in turn named after a California law enforcement term for a mentally disturbed person (a reference to Section 5150 of the California Welfare and Institutions Code). The album hit number 1 on the Billboard 200 chart, surpassing the band's previous album, 1984, which had peaked at number 2 behind Michael Jackson's Thriller album, on which Eddie made a guest appearance.

The album was remastered by Donn Landee and released on October 6, 2023, as part of The Collection II; the four studio albums with Hagar, plus an extra disc of eight rarities from this era.

== Overview ==
Van Halen had considerable difficulty finding a replacement for the popular David Lee Roth, until July 1985, when Eddie was referred to former Montrose singer Sammy Hagar by a mechanic working on Eddie's Lamborghini. The pair hit it off, and the new singer and band immediately began work on new songs. Van Halen went to work on the album in November 1985; it would be finished in February 1986, just one month before its release.

The album 5150 was notable for a number of love songs and ballads, a contrast of the straightforward heavy rock of the original albums. Many called the new incarnation "Van Hagar" (derisively or affectionately). The nickname was so ubiquitous that, as Hagar points out in his book, Warner Bros. asked them to consider renaming the band as such; the Van Halen brothers refused.

Bolstering criticism was the absence of Ted Templeman, who having produced every previous album for the band, left to helm Roth's solo Eat 'Em and Smile. Templeman would return to produce Van Halen's For Unlawful Carnal Knowledge several years later, for which Andy Johns had originally been tapped. Donn Landee took over producer duties for 5150 after serving as an engineer on previous albums. Foreigner guitarist Mick Jones was also brought in as a producer.

The production on this album was markedly different from their albums with Templeman. The guitar, previously high in the mix and frequently pushed to the left channel (to simulate a "live sound"), now sat equal in the mix and its overall sound had changed. This may have been Landee's doing, as he was not a fan of the "live mix".

5150 is the first Van Halen album not to feature any instrumental tracks as well as their first to be longer than 36 minutes.

== Artwork ==
The artwork features an Art Deco depiction of Atlas kneeling while holding a mirror-polished metallic sphere on his shoulders. The model for the album was ESPN BodyShaping's Rick Valente. The Van Halen logo wraps around the sphere; the first time the wings were shown on an album as curved instead of straight. The title of the album appears as a placard on a chain around Atlas' neck. The back cover of the album depicts the Atlas character collapsed, with the sphere dropped and broken open, revealing the band inside.

== Release ==
Despite the controversy of replacing Roth, the album was both the band's first (and Hagar's first) to top the Billboard 200, doing so on April 26, 1986, and was certified double platinum on May 28.

A live video created during the tour for this album was released as Live Without a Net, which has since been released on DVD. The tour was a significant change from previous tours. Where Van Halen previously had years of material to work with, even on tour supporting the first album, Hagar was uncomfortable performing a large number of songs from the original lineup. Therefore, most of the band's back catalog was dropped from the set lists. Instead, the shows consisted of almost the entire 5150 album, a few Hagar solo hits ("I Can't Drive 55" and "There's Only One Way to Rock"), and a cover of Led Zeppelin's "Rock and Roll"; the band also played a humorous verse of Robert Palmer's "Addicted to Love" as part of "Best of Both Worlds." Of the Roth-era tracks, "You Really Got Me", "Panama", and "Ain't Talkin' 'bout Love" were regularly performed. Unlike Roth, Hagar was an established guitarist, allowing Eddie to play keyboards on some songs.

== Critical reception ==
Professional ratings
Review scores
Source	Rating
AllMusic	4/5 stars
Christgau's Record Guide: The '80s	C+
Kerrang!	3/5 stars
Rolling Stone	3/5 stars
The Rolling Stone Album Guide	3/5 stars

Reviews for 5150 were initially mixed, but in later years the album became considered one of Van Halen's most complete recordings. The Village Voice's Robert Christgau rated the album a C+, which signifies "a not disreputable performance, most likely a failed experiment or a pleasant piece of hackwork." He wondered how "the guitar mavens who thought Eddie equalled Van Halen are going to like his fireworks displays and balls-to-the-wall hooks now that video star David Lee Roth has given way to one of the biggest schmucks in the known biz." He also stated that "no musician with something to say could stomach responding to Sammy Hagar's call".

Furthermore, Tim Holmes for Rolling Stone rated the album three out of five stars. He noted that "part of Eddie Van Halen's cheeky genius [...] lies in his ability to think in terms of both complex orchestration and rock banalities". He also said that "Eddie can still split the atom with his axe, and he knows it. It's a Van Halen world with or without David Lee Roth, and 5150 shoots off all the bombastic fireworks of a band at the peak of its powers." He concluded that "ultimately, it is Eddie Van Halen's uncanny and intuitive ability to orchestrate these contradictions that gives the Van Halen machinery its velocity and amplitude."

A retrospective review from AllMusic's Stephen Thomas Erlewine was fairly positive. Erlewine noted the pronounced shift in mood from Roth's tongue-in-cheek humor to Hagar's more serious persona which "plays it right down the middle, never winking, never joking". But Erlewine also praised the stronger songwriting due to Hagar bringing "a previously unheard sense of discipline" which led to 5150 being a "pretty impressive opening act for Van Halen Mach II."

== Track listing ==
All tracks are written by Edward Van Halen, Sammy Hagar, Michael Anthony, and Alex Van Halen.

Side one
No.	Title	Length
1.	"Good Enough"	4:05
2.	"Why Can't This Be Love"	3:48
3.	"Get Up"	4:37
4.	"Dreams"	4:54
5.	"Summer Nights"	5:06
Total length:		22:30

Side two
No.	Title	Length
6.	"Best of Both Worlds"	4:49
7.	"Love Walks In"	5:11
8.	"5150"	5:44
9.	"Inside"	5:02
Total length:		20:46

== Personnel ==
Van Halen

- Sammy Hagar – lead and backing vocals, guitar
- Edward Van Halen – guitar, keyboards, backing vocals
- Michael Anthony – bass guitar, backing vocals
- Alex Van Halen – drums, electronic drums

Production

- Dan Chapman – illustration
- Ken Deane – audio engineer
- Bobby Hata – mastering
- Mick Jones – producer
- Donn Landee – producer, engineer, 2023 remaster
- Jeri McManus – art direction
- Aaron Rapoport – photography
- Van Halen – art direction
- Alex Van Halen – producer
- Eddie Van Halen – producer

== Charts ==
Chart (1986)	Peak position
Australian Albums (Kent Music Report)	5
Austrian Albums (Ö3 Austria)	13
Canada Top Albums/CDs (RPM)	2
Dutch Albums (Album Top 100)	30
Finnish Albums (The Official Finnish Charts)	2
German Albums (Offizielle Top 100)	11
Japanese Albums (Oricon)	4
New Zealand Albums (RMNZ)	13
Norwegian Albums (VG-lista)	5
Swedish Albums (Sverigetopplistan)	2
Swiss Albums (Schweizer Hitparade)	16
UK Albums (Official Charts)	16
US Billboard 200	1

Chart (2026)	Peak position
Croatian International Albums (HDU)	11
Hungarian Physical Albums (MAHASZ)	18

== Certifications ==
Region	Certification	Certified units/sales
Australia (ARIA)	2× Platinum	140,000^{^}
Canada (Music Canada)	3× Platinum	300,000^{^}
Germany (BVMI)	Gold	250,000^{^}
United Kingdom (BPI)	Silver	60,000^{^}
United States (RIAA)	6× Platinum	6,000,000^{^}
^{^} Shipments figures based on certification alone.
