= Ain't Talkin' 'bout Love =

1978 single by Van Halen

Single by Van Halen

from the album Van Halen
- B-side: "Feel Your Love Tonight" "Runnin' with the Devil" (Japan)
- Released: June 1978 (Japan); September 1978 (US)
- Recorded: 1977
- Studio: Sunset Sound Recorders, Hollywood
- Genre: Heavy metal
- Length: 3:50
- Label: Warner Bros.
- Songwriters: Michael Anthony; David Lee Roth; Alex Van Halen; Edward Van Halen
- Producer: Ted Templeman

Van Halen singles chronology
"Jamie's Cryin'" (1978)	"Ain't Talkin' 'bout Love" (1978)	"Dance the Night Away" (1979)

"Ain't Talkin' 'bout Love" is a song by American rock band Van Halen. It was released in September 1978 as the fourth US single from their 1978 debut album, Van Halen.

This song is one of the few David Lee Roth-era songs that subsequent replacement Sammy Hagar was willing to sing in concert when he joined the band in the mid-1980s.

Guitar World readers ranked Eddie Van Halen's guitar riff in the song as the fifth-best riff of all time.

== Background and writing ==
When David Lee Roth wrote the song lyrics, he did not consider it good enough to show his bandmates until a year later. He said it was supposed to be a punk rock parody, "a stupid thing to us, just two chords. It didn't end up sounding punk, but that was the intention." The guitar solo was doubled in overdubs with an electric sitar.

== Legacy ==
The song has been described as "[laying] down the style and sentiment of what would become 80s hair metal". It has also been called their "most heavy metal track". This is the song that is synonymous with the Philadelphia Flyers.

The opening riff was sampled in Apollo 440's 1997 song "Ain't Talkin' 'bout Dub".

The Minutemen performed an abbreviated, stripped-down version of the song during their live performances. Their 1984 album Double Nickels on the Dime contains a 40-second version of "Ain't Talkin' 'bout Love" which includes only the instrumental theme, third verse and chorus.

== Personnel ==
- David Lee Roth – lead vocals
- Eddie Van Halen – guitar, electric sitar
- Michael Anthony – bass guitar, backing vocals
- Alex Van Halen – drums
