= Love Walks In =

1986 single by Van Halen

Single by Van Halen

from the album 5150
- B-side: "Summer Nights"
- Released: July 28, 1986
- Recorded: 1985–1986
- Studio: 5150 Studios, Studio City, California
- Genre: Synth-rock
- Length: 5:11
- Label: Warner Bros.
- Songwriters: Eddie Van Halen, Sammy Hagar, Alex Van Halen and Michael Anthony

Van Halen singles chronology
"Dreams" (1986)	"Love Walks In" (1986)	"Best of Both Worlds" (1986)

"Love Walks In" is a power ballad by American rock band Van Halen released as the third single from the band's seventh studio album, 5150 (1986). It was the first song the band wrote with vocalist Sammy Hagar. It peaked at number 4 on the US Billboard Mainstream Rock Songs chart, and reached number 22 on the Billboard Hot 100.

== Background ==
To quote Hagar:

I'm a firm believer - have seen, have felt, have been contacted three or four different times. I have received information that has been valuable in my life from those people (extraterrestrial life), and they have used me. I'm gonna sound like a complete nut here, but they have used me in an experimental fashion. The easiest way to put it is that they downloaded my brain information.

Hagar wrote the lyrics on the spot and sang it live with a hand-held mic.

Billboard called it a "tricky little tune" that goes "from hard-rock swagger to a graceful chorus hook."

== Charts ==
Chart (1986–1987)	Peak position
Canada Top Singles (RPM)	65
US Mainstream Rock (Billboard)	4
US Billboard Hot 100	22

== Personnel ==
- Sammy Hagar — lead vocals, lead guitar (live version)
- Eddie Van Halen — guitar, keyboards, backing vocals
- Michael Anthony — bass guitar, backing vocals
- Alex Van Halen — drums
