= Why Can't This Be Love =

1986 single by Van Halen

Single by Van Halen

from the album 5150
- B-side: "Get Up"
- Released: March 1986
- Recorded: 1985–1986
- Genre: Synth-pop; glam metal; pop rock
- Length: 3:47 / 5:00 (extended version)
- Label: Warner Bros.
- Songwriters: Eddie Van Halen; Michael Anthony; Sammy Hagar; Alex Van Halen
- Producers: Mick Jones; Donn Landee; Eddie Van Halen; Michael Anthony; Sammy Hagar; Alex Van Halen

Van Halen singles chronology
"Hot for Teacher" (1984)	"Why Can't This Be Love" (1986)	"Dreams" (1986)

"Why Can't This Be Love" is a song by the American rock band Van Halen for their seventh studio album, 5150 (1986). The song was the group's first single with Sammy Hagar, replacing founding member David Lee Roth. It was released on both 7" and 12" formats with the latter having an extended version featuring extra lyrics.

In the US, it went to number three on the Billboard Hot 100 and hit number one on the Cashbox Top 100, the week of May 16. It was a top 10 hit in the United Kingdom, Australia and Germany and a top 20 single in Canada, the Netherlands and Sweden.

== Background ==
5150 was a detour from the band, and the direction they would follow centered on a more keyboard-driven sound.

"The old people that were in doubt, they heard (imitates keyboard riff notes) ‘Why Can’t This Be Love’ and they just went, ‘Whoa, this is a new sound for Van Halen,'" said Hagar in 2023. "You know that keyboard riff sounded like a guitar riff. [Whereas] previous stuff like ‘Jump’ sounded like a synthesizer. So some of the hardcore guitar people rebelled a little bit, but they got a whole new audience with that. And we just satisfied them, and they stayed. And we just went out, and every show sold out in minutes, and we went out and just killed it."

== Reception ==
Cash Box called it "a powerful pop/rock kicker." Billboard said "hard-rocking hooks alternate with trademark guitar workouts."

Chuck Klosterman of Vulture.com ranked it the worst Van Halen song, saying that the band's decision to release the song as the first single of the Sammy Hagar era was "the worst decision the band ever made," but said it was not his least favorite Van Halen song to listen to.

== Live performances and in popular culture ==
During the 5150 and OU812 tours, Eddie Van Halen played the keyboard parts (using either a Kurzweil K250 or Yamaha KX88 connected by MIDI to an OB-8 backstage) while Hagar played the guitar parts and the solo. For the For Unlawful Carnal Knowledge and subsequent tours, Van Halen took over the guitar parts and the keyboards were played backstage. Starting during the 1995 Balance tour, Michael Anthony and Eddie Van Halen would sing the second verse of the song during live performances. They would continue to do this on both the 1998 and 2004 tours.

The song is often a source of humor since it contains this tautological lyric: "Only time will tell if we stand the test of time". In 2008, The Daily Telegraph named this the eighth worst lyric of all time.

== Personnel ==
- Sammy Hagar – lead vocals
- Eddie Van Halen – guitar, keyboards, backing vocals
- Michael Anthony – bass, backing vocals
- Alex Van Halen – drums, backing vocals

== Charts ==
=== Weekly charts ===
Weekly sales chart performance for "Why Can't This Be Love"
Chart (1986–1987)	Peak position
Australia (Kent Music Report)	8
Canada Top Singles (RPM)	13
Europe (European Hot 100 Singles)	11
Ireland (IRMA)	8
Netherlands (Dutch Top 40)	16
Netherlands (Single Top 100)	15
New Zealand (Recorded Music NZ)	32
Sweden (Sverigetopplistan)	11
UK Singles (Official Charts)	8
US Billboard Hot 100	3
US Mainstream Rock Airplay (Billboard)	1
West Germany (GfK)	8

=== Year-end charts ===
Year-end chart performance for "Why Can't This Be Love"
Chart (1986)	Rank
Australia (Kent Music Report)	33
Europe (European Hot 100 Singles)	86
UK Singles (OCC)	100
US Billboard Hot 100	69
West Germany (Media Control)	51

== Certifications ==
Region	Certification	Certified units/sales
New Zealand (RMNZ)	Gold	15,000^{‡}
^{‡} Sales+streaming figures based on certification alone.
