= Eddie Van Halen =

American rock guitarist and songwriter (1955–2020)

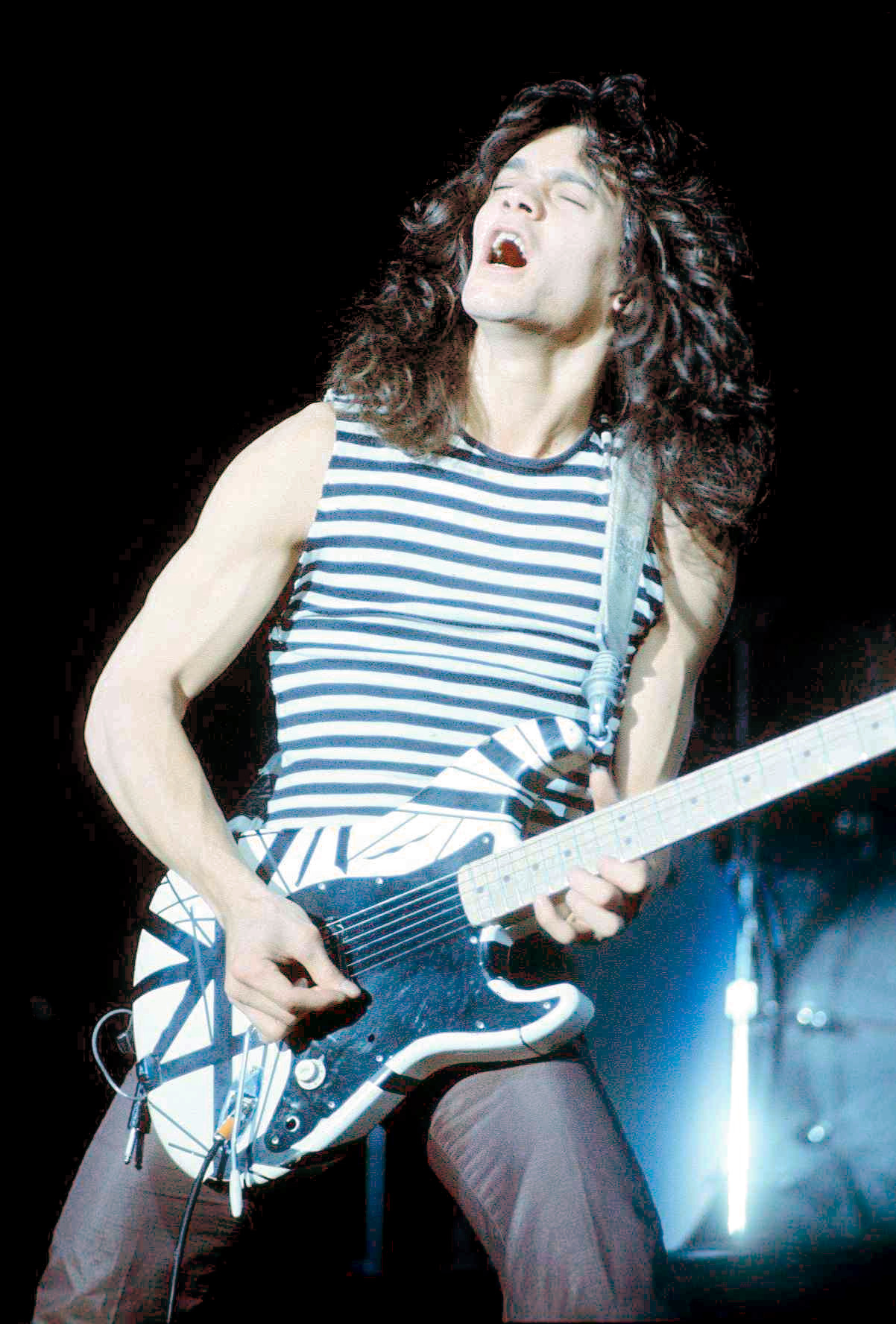
- Van Halen in 1978
- Born: Edward Lodewijk Van Halen; January 26, 1955; Amsterdam, Netherlands
- Died: October 6, 2020 (aged 65); Santa Monica, California, U.S.
- Occupations: Musician; songwriter
- Years active: 1964–2020
- Spouses: Valerie Bertinelli (m. 1981; div. 2007); Janie Liszewski (m. 2009)
- Children: Wolfgang Van Halen
- Relatives: Alex Van Halen (brother)
- Musical career
- Origin: Pasadena, California, U.S.
- Genres: Hard rock; heavy metal; glam metal; pop rock
- Instruments: Guitar
- Formerly of: Van Halen

Edward Lodewijk Van Halen (/væn ˈheɪlən/ van HAY-lən; Dutch: [ˈɛtʋɑrt ˈloːdəʋɛik fɑn ˈɦaːlə(n)]; January 26, 1955 – October 6, 2020) was an American musician and songwriter. He was the guitarist, keyboardist, backing vocalist, and the primary songwriter of the rock band Van Halen, which he founded with his brother Alex Van Halen in 1972, and the brothers were the only two constant members during the band's existence. He is widely regarded as one of the greatest guitarists in rock history.

Eddie Van Halen was well-known for popularizing the tapping guitar technique, allowing rapid arpeggios to be played with two hands on the fretboard. Van Halen was voted number one in a Guitar World Magazine poll for "The 100 Greatest Guitarists of All Time" poll. Rolling Stone ranked Van Halen 4th in its list of the "250 Greatest Guitarists of All Time" in 2023.

Van Halen dealt with numerous health issues beginning in the 1990s. On October 6, 2020, Van Halen died of a stroke at Saint John's Health Center in Santa Monica, California at the age of 65.

== Early life, family and education ==
Edward Lodewijk Van Halen was born in Amsterdam on January 26, 1955, the son of Jan Van Halen and Eugenia (née Van Beers). His father was a Dutch jazz pianist, clarinetist, and saxophonist who worked for the Dutch Air Force and played with local acts like Jos Cleber and Snip en Snap. Van Halen's mother was a Euro-Indonesian woman from Rangkasbitung on the island of Java in the Dutch East Indies, now Indonesia. After six years in Indonesia, the couple moved to Amsterdam in 1949 and later moved to Nijmegen, Netherlands.

After experiencing mistreatment for their mixed-race relationship in the 1950s, Jan and Eugenia Van Halen moved their family to the US in 1962. They settled near family members in Pasadena, California, where Jan Van Halen worked as a janitor to supplement the income he earned from playing music in venues like The Continental Club, La Miranda Country Club and The Alpine Haus. After Eddie's brother Alex had occasionally filled in on drums, Eddie played bass when the band was a member short. His mother worked as a maid to help make ends meet. Since Alex and Eddie did not speak English as a first language, they were considered "minority" students and experienced bullying by white students. They began learning the piano at age six, commuting from Pasadena to San Pedro, Los Angeles, to study with an elderly piano teacher, Stasys Kalvaitis.

Van Halen never learned to read music. Instead, he watched recitals of Bach or Mozart repertoire and improvised. Between 1964 and 1967, he won first place in the annual piano competition at Long Beach City College. Their parents wanted their sons to be classical pianists, but the boys gravitated towards rock music, and were greatly influenced by 1960s British Invasion bands such as the Beatles and the Dave Clark Five.

Initially, Alex began playing the guitar and Eddie bought a drum kit; however, after he heard Alex's performance of the Surfaris' drum solo on the song "Wipe Out", Eddie gave Alex the drums and began learning the electric guitar. According to him, as a teen he often practiced while walking around at home with his guitar strapped on, or sitting in his room for hours with the door locked.

Eddie and Alex formed their first band with three other boys. Calling themselves The Broken Combs, they performed at lunchtime at Hamilton Elementary School in Pasadena. Eddie cited this performance when he was in the fourth grade as key to his desire to become a professional musician. He described supergroup Cream's "I'm So Glad" on the album Goodbye as "mind-blowing". He once claimed that he had learned almost all of Eric Clapton's solos in the band Cream note for note. "I've always said Eric Clapton was my main influence," he said, "but Jimmy Page was actually more the way I am, in a reckless-abandon kind of way." Speaking at an event at the Smithsonian's National Museum of American History in 2015, Van Halen discussed his life and the American Dream. "We came here with approximately $50 and a piano, and we didn't speak the language. Now look where we are. If that's not the American dream, what is?"

== Career ==
=== Van Halen ===
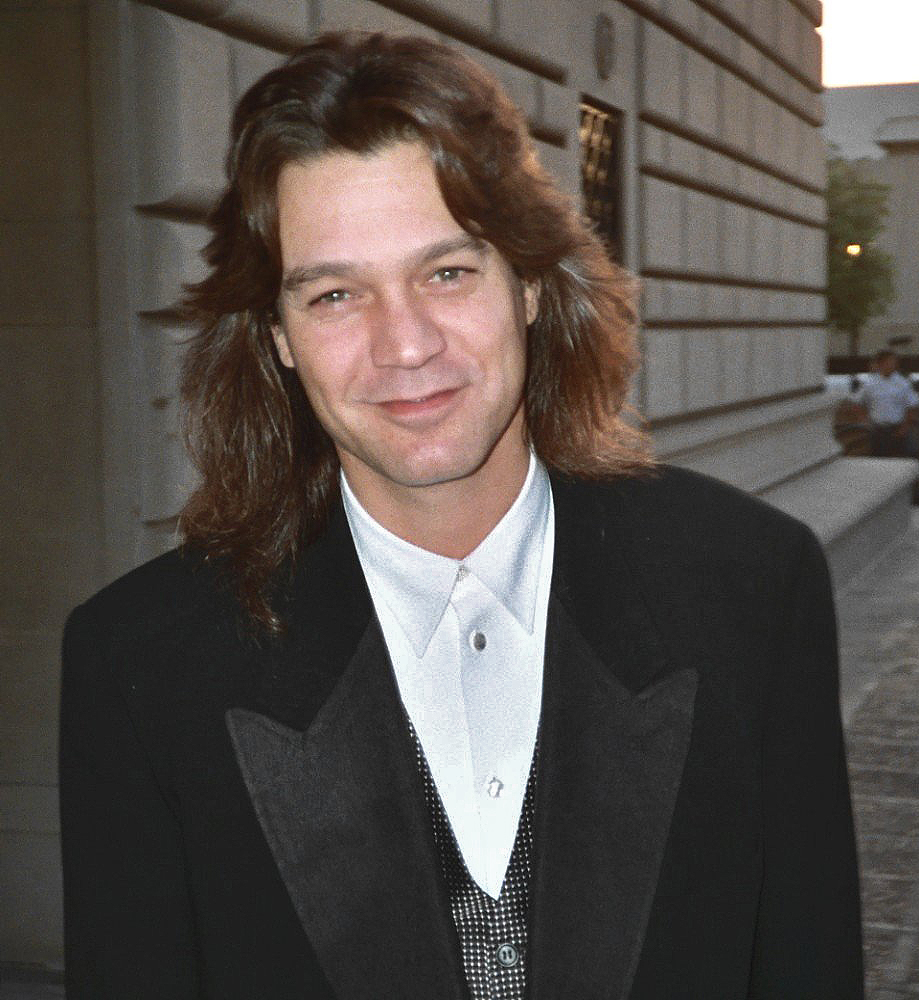
Eddie Van Halen at the 1993 Emmy Awards

In 1972, Eddie and his brother Alex formed the band Mammoth. In 1974, David Lee Roth joined Mammoth as lead singer, and Mammoth officially changed its name to Van Halen. It became a staple of the Los Angeles music scene, playing at well-known clubs such as the Whisky a Go Go. At a 1976 concert at The Starwood in California, the band opened for UFO. Kiss bassist Gene Simmons saw the performance and said, "I was waiting backstage by the third song." He asked the band about their plans, and they said, "There is a yogurt manufacturer that is going to invest in us."

Simmons begged them not to go that route and invited them to record some demos at Electric Lady Studios in Greenwich Village, New York City. Simmons signed them to his company, and the band recorded early demos of their songs, including "Runnin' with the Devil". Excited about the band, Simmons approached Kiss manager Bill Aucoin and Kiss frontman Paul Stanley about them, but they dismissed his desire to sign them to Aucoin's management fold. Stanley later said he "rejected Van Halen to protect Kiss", and that they made an effort to make Simmons drop the band to "keep Gene in check". The discouraging words caused Simmons to rip up the contract, and he "let them go" after feeling he may have held the band back. The next year, Warner Records offered Van Halen a recording contract.

Eddie remained on good terms with Simmons. It was rumored that Eddie nearly replaced guitarist Ace Frehley after his departure from Kiss in 1982, but that Simmons talked him out of leaving Van Halen. Neither Paul Stanley nor Eddie Van Halen remember this happening. Stanley recalled Eddie coming down to the studio, being "blown away" by their song "Creatures of the Night", and telling Stanley he wanted to get into playing keyboards. Stanley was confused at Eddie's interest in keyboards, but his interest resulted in the creation of "Jump".

The band's 1978 album Van Halen reached No. 19 on the Billboard pop music charts and was one of rock's most commercially successful debuts, highly regarded as both a heavy metal and hard rock album. By the early 1980s, Van Halen was one of the most successful rock acts of the time.

Their album 1984 went five-times Platinum a year after its release. Its lead single, "Jump", became the band's only No. 1 pop hit, despite frontman David Lee Roth's thoughts on Eddie's playing the keyboard rather than the guitar, and brought them a Grammy nomination. The band won the 1992 Grammy Award for Best Hard Rock Performance with Vocals for the album For Unlawful Carnal Knowledge.

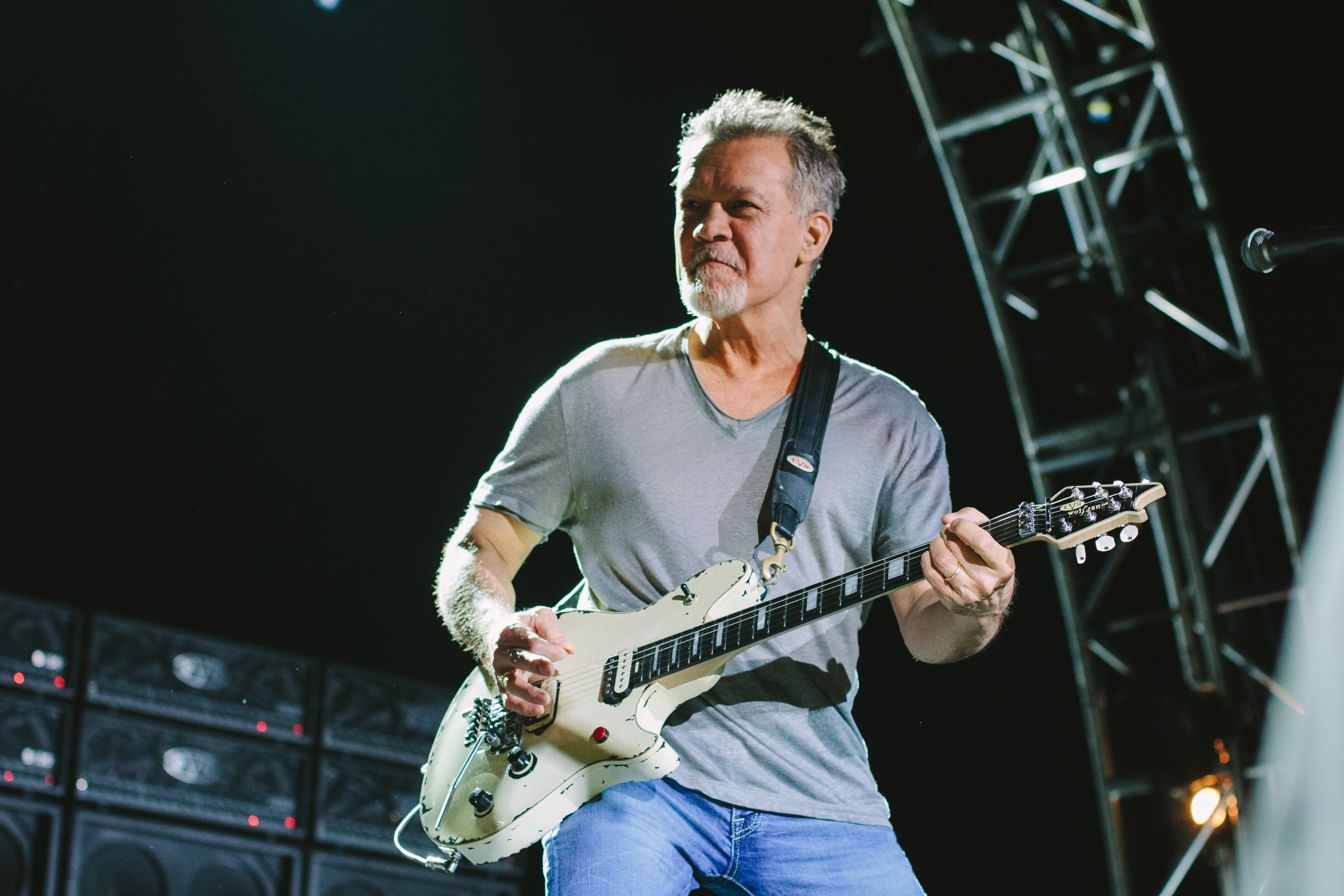
Van Halen performing in 2014

In 2019, the band ranked 20th on the RIAA list of best-selling artists, with 56 million album sales in the US and more than 100 million worldwide. Van Halen charted 13 number-one hits in the history of Billboard's Mainstream Rock chart. VH1 ranked the band seventh on a list of the top 100 hard rock artists of all time. In 2007, Van Halen was inducted into the Rock and Roll Hall of Fame. Individually, Van Halen received acclaim for his guitar work in the band.

=== Other work ===
Van Halen engaged in several projects outside of his band, including solo work and partnerships with his brother on film soundtracks such as The Wild Life in 1984, Twister in 1996, and Sacred Sin in 2006, as well as musical collaborations with Kiss bassist Gene Simmons, singer-songwriter Nicolette Larson, Queen guitarist Brian May, Sammy Hagar, Black Sabbath, Roger Waters, Toto guitarist Steve Lukather, and LL Cool J.

In 1982, Eddie Van Halen contributed the guitar solo to "Beat It", for Michael Jackson's album Thriller, which became the biggest selling album of all time. Van Halen became involved after The Who guitarist Pete Townshend became unavailable and recommended him. Van Halen met with Quincy Jones and Jackson. Unsure of what he could add to a pop song, he played along with the song and ended up restructuring it before adding the classic solo.

In a 2012 CNN interview, he said, "I listened to the song, and I immediately go, 'Can I change some parts?' I turned to the engineer and I go, 'OK, from the breakdown, chop in this part, go to this piece, pre-chorus, to the chorus, out.' Took him maybe 10 minutes to put it together. And I proceeded to improvise two solos over it."

He added, "I was just finishing the second solo when Michael walked in. And you know artists are kind of crazy people. We're all a little bit strange. I didn't know how he would react to what I was doing. So I warned him before he listened. I said, 'Look, I changed the middle section of your song.' Now in my mind, he's either going to have his bodyguards kick me out for butchering his song, or he's going to like it. And so he gave it a listen, and he turned to me and went, 'Wow, thank you so much for having the passion to not just come in and blaze a solo but to actually care about the song and make it better." Van Halen was so pleased, he refused payment for his work. Jackson's Thriller went to the No. 1 spot on the charts, pushing Van Halen's album 1984 to No. 2.

Van Halen made cameo appearances in the music video for Frank Sinatra's "L.A. Is My Lady", an episode of Café Americain starring his then-wife Valerie Bertinelli, and an episode of Two and a Half Men.

== Equipment ==
=== Guitars ===
Eddie Van Halen's first guitar, purchased as a child from Sears and Roebuck, was a Teisco Del Rey. He played the guitar in his elementary school band, The Broken Combs. Van Halen played many custom-built and heavily modified guitars, especially early in his career. Upon Ed embarking on his professional music career, his father purchased a Gibson Les Paul for him. He replaced the original P90 pickup on the bridge with a humbucker to sound like Eric Clapton. He later bought and briefly used a Gibson ES-335, also because of its association with Clapton, though he damaged the body while modifying it and it later became cannibalized for parts on numerous other home-build guitar projects. He also owned an Ibanez Destroyer that was used extensively on the debut Van Halen album. Originally used in its natural wood finish, he later painted it white and made several modifications to the electronics. After recording the album, he used a chainsaw to drastically modify the body shape, cutting a deep V into the bottom of the guitar, and painting it in a similar way to his later, more famous, Frankenstrat. Inset into the V he hand-carved teeth and set two eyehooks and chains; the new distinctive shape led to it being nicknamed "The Shark". He only played it for a short time in this state, however, as the modifications changed the tone of the guitar in an unsatisfactory way; he did retain the guitar for the rest of his life. The final state of the Shark can be seen on the cover of Women and Children First, where he posed with the guitar.

==== Frankenstein ====
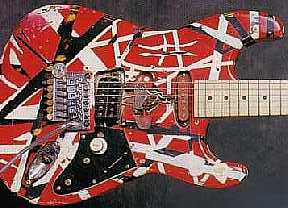
Van Halen's "Frankenstrat"

Van Halen is most associated with a custom guitar he built from parts, commonly referred to as the Frankenstrat or Frankenstein. According to Eddie's son Wolfgang, Eddie did not have a name for the guitar, but the case said "Frankenstein", which he considers official. Originally pictured on his band's self-titled debut album, the maple neck cost $80, while the ash body was bought for $50 as the wood had a knot in it. The tremolo bridge was originally taken from a 1958 Fender Stratocaster and was later replaced with a Floyd Rose tremolo. He frequently replaced the neck on the guitar, going through a number of different ones through the years, and the pickup configuration was also frequently changed. In its most commonly used configuration, the guitar had a single functional pickup, a Gibson PAF bridge pickup from his ES-335, which he potted with paraffin wax to prevent feedback. The middle pickup was removed and in its place, he had stuffed a non-functional selector switch and random wires, while the neck pickup slot was replaced with a red single-coil pickup that was also non-functional. The original selector switches and tone knobs were removed, and the volume knob was replaced with a knob labeled "TONE". The Frankenstein, as shown on the cover of Van Halen I, was originally painted white with black stripes, but was recoated with Schwinn red bicycle paint in 1979.

Before and during the recording of Van Halen II, he built a second "partscaster" guitar painted in a distinctive black-and-yellow striped paint job that earned it the moniker "The Bumblebee Guitar". That guitar was later donated to Rita Haney, the longtime partner of Dimebag Darrell Abbott, shortly after his death; it was placed in his casket and buried along with him. Eddie Van Halen used a mini-Les Paul guitar for "Little Guitars" (Diver Down). This is the only Van Halen recording that the guitar was used for. The mini-Les Paul was made by Nashville luthier David Petschulat and was pitched and sold to him during a tour stop in Nashville, Tennessee. He later purchased a second mini-LP guitar, built to slightly different specs, the first being a honey-sunburst with mini-humbuckers, and the second being dark wine-red with a thicker body and full-size humbuckers. In 1982, Van Halen made his first guitar endorsement by launching the Baretta model with Kramer. This partnership lasted a decade. In the mid-1980s, he purchased a Steinberger GL2T guitar. Its distinctive switch-operated vibrato system can be heard on the 5150 album. From 1991 to 1995, Van Halen worked with Ernie Ball / Music Man, developing the Music Man EVH model guitar, which was later renamed the Axis after the partnership ended. In 1996, Van Halen teamed up with Peavey, where they developed the Peavey EVH Wolfgang; this relationship lasted until 2004, when Van Halen joined forces with Fender, initially releasing the Edward-endorsed Art Series guitars under Fender's Charvel brand and later developing the EVH brand. In 2006, Fender created the "Frank 2", a near-perfect production replica of the original Frankenstrat; Van Halen later claimed that when presented the two guitars in a blind comparison, he had some trouble picking out the original home-made guitar from Fender's production replica. For Van Halen's 2012 tour, and early 2015 television appearances, he used a Wolfgang USA guitar with a black finish and ebony fretboard. For the 2015 tour, he used a white Wolfgang USA guitar designed by Chip Ellis, featuring a custom kill switch.

=== Settings ===
Van Halen's first string endorsement deal happened around 1989 when Ernie Ball launched the 5150 EVH line of guitar strings. The gauge of the strings differed slightly from typical electric guitar strings at the time, which were 9, 11, 16, 24, 32 and 42 (in thousandths of an inch) - the EVH Ernie Ball strings measured 9, 11, 15, 24, 32 and 40. After this endorsement deal ended, guitar strings became part of the Fender EVH line and are now sold as EVH Premium Strings. Van Halen used a variety of pickups, including 1970s Mighty Mites, which were made by Seymour Duncan and were copies of DiMarzio Super Distortion pickups.

He also used Gibson PAFs, one of which was rewound by Seymour Duncan in 1978. In an interview with Guitar World in 1985, Van Halen stated that his guitar sound style which he called "brown sound" is "...basically a tone, a feeling that I'm always working at ... It comes from the person. If the person doesn't even know what that type of tone I'm talking about is, they can't really work towards it, can they?" In a June 2015 interview with Billboard magazine, he stated that with the expression "brown sound" he actually tried to describe the sound of his brother Alex's snare drum, which he thought "...sounds like he's beating on a log. It's very organic. So it wasn't my brown sound. It was Alex's."

In 1993, Van Halen collaborated with Peavey Electronics to develop a series of amplifiers and cabinets, collectively called the 5150 series, which ended in 2004. Van Halen then began work with Fender, developing the EVH products and brand. In 2007, the first EVH branded amplifiers were produced by Fender, followed shortly after by a limited-edition "Frankenstrat" inspired guitar. In 2009, they continued to press forward on the guitar front by releasing the Wolfgang-inspired EVH guitar line. The brand has since expanded to include additional guitars and accessories. Van Halen was awarded three patents related to guitars: a folding prop to support a guitar in a flat position, a tension-adjusting tailpiece, and an ornamental design for a headstock.

=== Keyboards ===
The first recorded keyboard work by Van Halen is "And the Cradle Will Rock...", written and performed on a Wurlitzer electric piano through a Marshall amp. The riff for "Dancing in the Street" (on Diver Down) was written and performed on Minimoog. "Jump" and "I'll Wait" were written and performed on an Oberheim OB-Xa, while "Dreams", "Why Can't This Be Love" and "Love Walks In" are with Oberheim OB-8. Eddie also wrote "When It's Love" and "Right Now" on keyboards.

During the 5150 and OU812 tours, Eddie Van Halen would play keyboard parts live while Sammy Hagar played the guitar. From the For Unlawful Carnal Knowledge tour, Van Halen played guitar throughout the concerts, while the keyboards were played backstage by touring keyboardist Alan Fitzgerald up through 2012.

== Style and influence ==
=== Technique ===
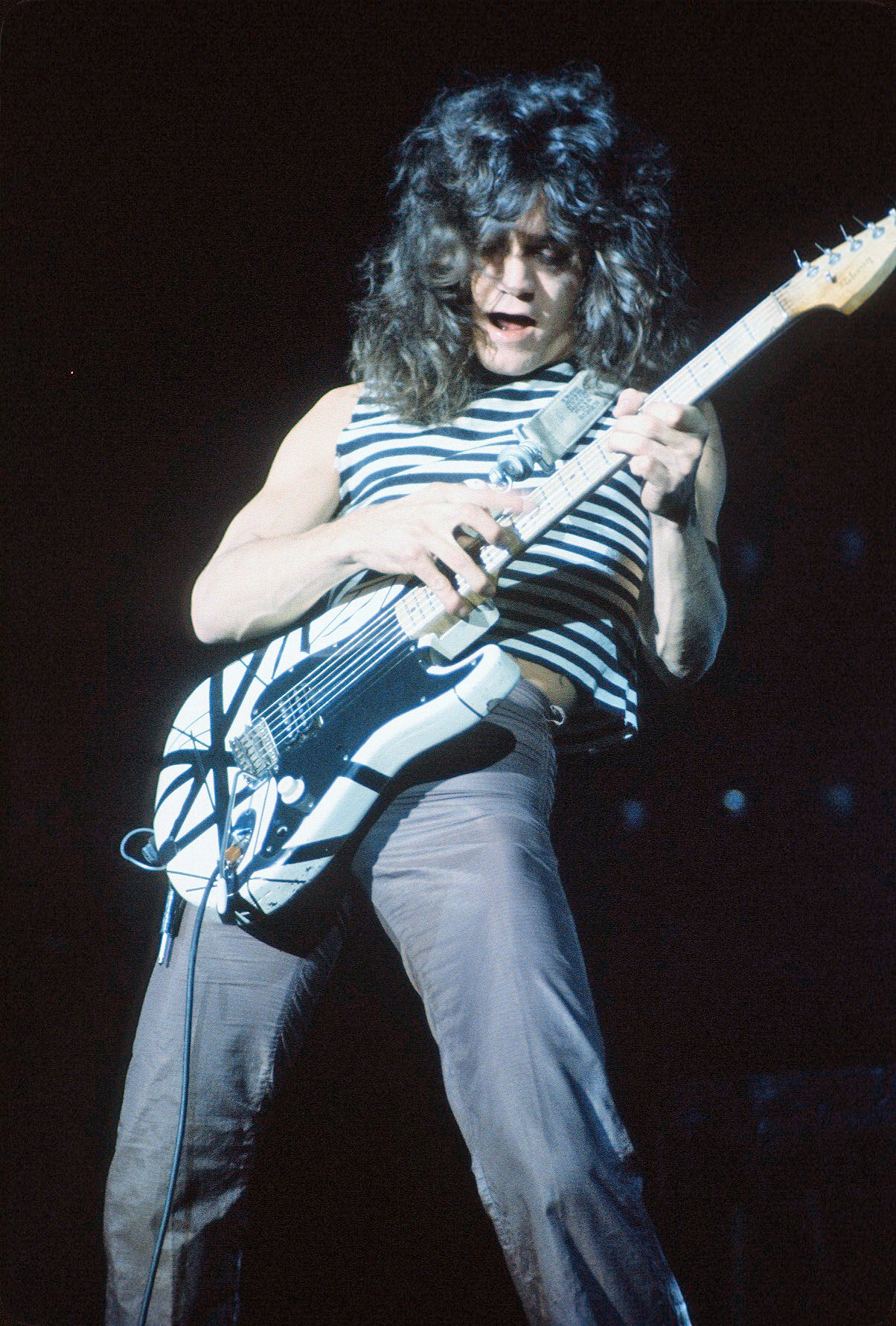
Van Halen using the tapping technique while performing at New Haven Coliseum in 1978

Van Halen's 1978 instrumental solo "Eruption", which was voted number 2 in Guitar World's readers poll of the "100 Greatest Guitar Solos", showcased the tapping technique, which uses both left and right hands on the guitar neck. Although he popularized tapping, he did not invent the technique. According to MusicRadar, Steve Hackett – lead guitarist with Genesis in the 1970s – is "widely credited with inventing two-handed tapping" and was an influence on Van Halen. When asked about this, Hackett said, "Eddie and I have never spoken about it, but yes, he has credited me with tapping... Eddie is a fine player, of course, and he's the one who named the technique."

George Lynch said in an interview that he and Van Halen saw Harvey Mandel tap at the Starwood in the 1970s. Van Halen named Jimmy Page of Led Zeppelin as an influence, saying in one interview with Guitar World:

"I think I got the idea of tapping watching Jimmy Page do his "Heartbreaker" solo back in 1971. He was doing a pull-off to an open string, and I thought wait a minute, open string ... pull off. I can do that, but what if I use my finger as the nut and move it around? I just kind of took it and ran with it."

Until it expired in 2005, Van Halen held a patent for a flip-out support device that attaches to the rear of the electric guitar. This device enables the user to employ the tapping technique by playing the guitar in a manner similar to the piano with the face of the guitar oriented upward instead of forward.

== Personal life ==
=== Marriages and family ===
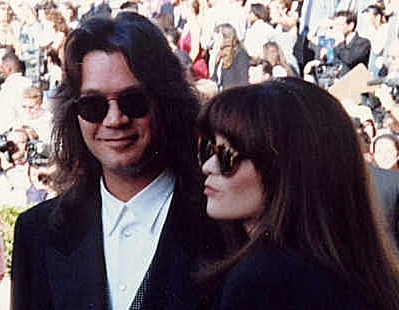
Van Halen and his first wife, Valerie Bertinelli, 1993

In 1980, Van Halen met actress Valerie Bertinelli at a Van Halen concert in Shreveport, Louisiana. They married in California eight months later on April 11, 1981, and had one son, Wolfgang, in 1991. In 2005, Bertinelli filed for divorce in Los Angeles after four years of separation. The divorce was finalized in 2007.

In 2008, Eddie proposed to his girlfriend, Janie Liszewski, an actress and stuntwoman who was Van Halen's publicist at the time. The two married in 2009 at his Studio City estate, with his son Wolfgang and ex-wife Bertinelli in attendance. His brother Alex Van Halen is an ordained minister, and he officiated Eddie's 2009 wedding and that of his former sister-in-law, Valerie Bertinelli, when she remarried in 2011.

=== Health ===
Van Halen struggled with alcoholism and drug addiction throughout his life. He began smoking and drinking at the age of 12, and stated that he eventually needed alcohol to function. He entered rehabilitation in 2007, and shared in a 2015 interview that he had been sober since 2008.

Van Halen was diagnosed with chronic avascular necrosis in 1995. After suffering from lingering injuries from past, high-risk, acrobatic stage performances and crashes, he underwent hip replacement surgery in 1999.

Van Halen began receiving treatment for tongue cancer in 2000. The subsequent surgery removed roughly a third of his tongue. He was declared cancer-free in 2002. He blamed the tongue cancer on his habit of holding guitar picks in his mouth, stating in 2015: "I used metal picks – they're brass and copper – which I always held in my mouth, in the exact place where I got the tongue cancer. ... I mean, I was smoking and doing a lot of drugs and a lot of everything. But at the same time, my lungs are totally clear. This is just my own theory, but the doctors say it's possible."

In 2012, Van Halen underwent emergency surgery for a severe bout of diverticulitis. Recovery time required due to the surgery led to postponement of Van Halen tour dates scheduled in Japan.

Van Halen was hospitalized in 2019 after battling throat cancer over the previous five years, and his ex-wife Valerie Bertinelli also mentioned lung cancer in an Instagram post shortly after his death.

=== Death ===
Van Halen died of a stroke at Saint John's Health Center in Santa Monica, California, on October 6, 2020, at the age of 65, surrounded by his wife, Janie; son and then-current bassist of Van Halen, Wolfgang; ex-wife Valerie Bertinelli; and brother and co-founder/drummer of Van Halen, Alex. Wolfgang confirmed his death on social media later that same day. Some of Van Halen's childhood landmarks in Pasadena became memorials where fans could pay their respects. Van Halen was cremated, and his ashes were given to Wolfgang.

== Legacy ==
In February 2017, Van Halen donated 75 guitars from his personal collection to the Mr. Holland's Opus Foundation, a program that provides musical instruments to students in low-income schools.

At the 2020 Billboard Music Awards, Van Halen was honored by several former musicians he worked with. Jack White from The White Stripes, G. E. Smith, Charlie Benante from Anthrax, and Dierks Bentley gave speeches as a tribute to his career. Wolfgang Van Halen also shared several personal photos between him and his father.

On October 10, 2020, Saturday Night Live paid tribute by playing a clip of him performing with G. E. Smith from a February 1987 show, which was hosted by Valerie Bertinelli.

In 2020, the Pasadena Library, located in Pasadena, California, offered several archives and documents related to Van Halen. The collection included several albums, along with photographs by Neil Zlozower, and several CDs. The library also uploaded Van Halen's albums to Hoopla.

On November 16, 2020, Wolfgang Van Halen announced on The Howard Stern Show that Van Halen would not continue as a band, saying "You can't have Van Halen without Eddie Van Halen".

The Red Hot Chili Peppers paid tribute to Van Halen on their song "Eddie" from their 2022 album Return of the Dream Canteen.

It was announced in 2025 that Sotheby's would auction one of Van Halen's custom-built 1982 Kramer guitars in October. His guitar will headline the pop-culture collectibles “Grails Week” and is estimated at $2–3 million.

== Discography ==
=== With Van Halen ===
- Van Halen (1978)
- Van Halen II (1979)
- Women and Children First (1980)
- Fair Warning (1981)
- Diver Down (1982)
- 1984 (1984)
- 5150 (1986)
- OU812 (1988)
- For Unlawful Carnal Knowledge (1991)
- Balance (1995)
- Van Halen III (1998)
- A Different Kind of Truth (2012)

=== Solo discography ===
- "Donut City" for The Wild Life (1984)
- "Respect the Wind" for Twister (1996)

=== Guest appearances ===
- Nicolette Larson - Nicolette (1978)
- Michael Jackson - Thriller (1982)
- Brian May - Star Fleet Project (1983)
- Sammy Hagar - I Never Said Goodbye (1987)
- Steve Lukather - Lukather (1989)
- Thomas Dolby - Astronauts & Heretics (1992)
- Black Sabbath - Cross Purposes (1994; co-writer of "Evil Eye")
- Rich Wyman - Fatherless Child (1996)
- David Garfield - Tribute to Jeff (1997)
- Roger Waters - The Legend of 1900 (1999)
- Steve Lukather - Santamental (2003)
- LL Cool J - Authentic (2013)

=== Other Appearances ===
- Tone Lōc - Wild Thing (1988)(Guitar sampled from Van Halen's 1978 song Jamie's Cryin')
- 2 Live Crew - "The Fuck Shop" (1989)(Guitar riff and hook sampled from Van Halen's 1978 song Ain't Talkin' 'bout Love)
- Manika (singer) - "I Might Go Lesbian (feat. Tyga)" (2015)(Guitar riff sampled from Van Halen's 1995 song Don't Tell Me (What Love Can Do))

== See also ==
- List of most valuable celebrity memorabilia

== Bibliography ==
- Bennett, Andrew (2022). Eruption In The Canyon: 212 Days and Nights with the Genius of Eddie Van Halen. Andrew Bennett. ISBN 978-1088066157.
- Brannigan, Paul (2021). Unchained: The Eddie Van Halen Story. Permuted Press. ISBN 978-1637583500.
- Gill, Chris; Tolinski, Brad (2021). Eruption: Conversations with Eddie Van Halen. Hachette. ISBN 978-0274800308.
- Rosen, Steve (2022). Tonechaser - Understanding Edward: My 26-Year Journey with Edward Van Halen. Steve Rosen. ISBN 979-8218000233.
- Zlozower, Neil (2011). Eddie Van Halen. Chronicle. ISBN 978-1452101361.
