= Tokyo Dome Live in Concert =

Live album by Van Halen
- Released: March 31, 2015
- Recorded: June 21, 2013
- Venue: Tokyo Dome (Tokyo, Japan)
- Genre: Hard rock, heavy metal
- Length: 119:52
- Label: Warner Bros.
- Producer: Van Halen

Van Halen chronology
A Different Kind of Truth (2012)	Tokyo Dome Live in Concert (2015)	The Japanese Singles 1978–1984 (2019)

Professional ratings
Review scores
Source	Rating
AllMusic	3/5 stars
Record Collector	3/5 stars

Tokyo Dome Live in Concert is the second live album by American rock band Van Halen, released on March 31, 2015. It is their first live album with original lead vocalist David Lee Roth and second live album overall after 1993's Live: Right Here, Right Now. It is the final Van Halen album released during Eddie Van Halen's lifetime.

== History ==
The official press release announcing the album arrived on February 5, 2015. This was only after the information leaked a couple days earlier and after months of speculation.

The album is Van Halen's first live album with their original lead singer David Lee Roth and third bassist Wolfgang Van Halen. The album features songs from every Roth-fronted Van Halen album, including their 2012 release, A Different Kind of Truth. However, the album has been criticized for Roth's vocal performance.

According to Eddie Van Halen, the band originally wanted to remix 25 original song demos that Van Halen had done before they were signed to a major label; however, the original tapes could not be found. They then considered releasing recordings of their early club performances, but the sound quality was deemed too poor. As a result, it was decided to choose a concert recording from their A Different Kind of Truth Tour. According to Eddie, they had a Pro Tools workstation attached to their mixing board each night of that tour. The rest of the band left it up to Roth to pick what live performance would be released, and he chose the Tokyo Dome show.

The cover artwork is an update of an existing 1935 painting of the SS Normandie by Cassandre.

== Track listing ==
All tracks are written by Edward Van Halen, Alex Van Halen, David Lee Roth, and Michael Anthony, except where noted.

Disc one
No.	Title	Writer(s)	Original album	Length
1.	"Unchained"		Fair Warning (1981)	4:56
2.	"Runnin' with the Devil"		Van Halen (1978)	3:44
3.	"She's the Woman"	E. Van Halen; A. Van Halen; Roth; Wolfgang Van Halen	A Different Kind of Truth (2012)	2:57
4.	"I'm the One"		Van Halen	4:12
5.	"Tattoo"	E. Van Halen; A. Van Halen; Roth; W. Van Halen	A Different Kind of Truth	4:32
6.	"Everybody Wants Some!!"		Women and Children First (1980)	8:30
7.	"Somebody Get Me a Doctor"		Van Halen II (1979)	3:22
8.	"China Town"	E. Van Halen; A. Van Halen; Roth; W. Van Halen	A Different Kind of Truth	3:22
9.	"Hear About It Later"		Fair Warning	5:11
10.	"(Oh) Pretty Woman"	Roy Orbison; Bill Dees	Diver Down (1982)	3:08
11.	"Me & You (Drum Solo)" (titled "Drum Struck" on digital releases)	A. Van Halen		2:54
12.	"You Really Got Me"	Ray Davies	Van Halen	5:34
Total length:				52:22

Disc two
No.	Title	Writer(s)	Original album	Length
1.	"Dance the Night Away"		Van Halen II	4:27
2.	"I'll Wait"	E. Van Halen; A. Van Halen; Roth; Anthony; Michael McDonald	1984 (1984)	5:03
3.	"And the Cradle Will Rock..."		Women and Children First	3:44
4.	"Hot for Teacher"		1984	5:44
5.	"Women in Love..."		Van Halen II	4:25
6.	"Romeo Delight"		Women and Children First	5:47
7.	"Mean Street"		Fair Warning	5:11
8.	"Beautiful Girls"		Van Halen II	3:36
9.	"Ice Cream Man"	John Brim	Van Halen	5:10
10.	"Panama"		1984	4:20
11.	"Eruption"		Van Halen	8:08
12.	"Ain't Talkin' 'bout Love"		Van Halen	6:07
13.	"Jump"		1984	5:48
Total length:				67:30

== Personnel ==
- David Lee Roth – lead vocals, acoustic guitar on "Ice Cream Man"
- Edward Van Halen – guitar, backing vocals
- Wolfgang Van Halen – bass, backing vocals
- Alex Van Halen – drums

== Charts ==
Chart (2015)	Peak position
Australian Albums (ARIA)	67
Belgian Albums (Ultratop Flanders)	115
Belgian Albums (Ultratop Wallonia)	71
Dutch Albums (Album Top 100)	48
French Albums (SNEP)	87
German Albums (Offizielle Top 100)	64
Japan (Oricon)	19
Scotland (Official)	57
Swiss Albums (Schweizer Hitparade)	59
UK Albums (OCC)	74
UK Rock & Metal Albums (OCC)	5
US (Billboard 200)	20
US (Billboard Rock Chart)	5
