= Van Halen 2015 North American Tour =

2015 concert tour by Van Halen

- Tour by Van Halen
- Location: North America
- Associated album: Tokyo Dome Live in Concert
- Start date: July 5, 2015
- End date: October 4, 2015
- Legs: 2
- No. of shows: 41

Van Halen concert chronology
- A Different Kind of Truth Tour (2012–2013); Van Halen Summer/Fall North America Tour (2015)

The Van Halen 2015 Tour was the final concert tour by the American hard rock band Van Halen in support of the group's live album, Tokyo Dome Live in Concert, recorded during the band's previous tour. The band toured the United States and Canada during the summer and fall of 2015. It was the final tour the band performed prior to the death of Eddie Van Halen in 2020.

== History ==
On March 24, 2015, the official Van Halen website was updated to announce a concert tour to take place during the summer and fall of 2015, primarily in outdoor venues. The band also announced that they would be performing on television for the first time, with performances on Jimmy Kimmel Live! on March 30, and on The Ellen DeGeneres Show on April 2.

The Kenny Wayne Shepherd Band served as the opening act for all dates except for the September 19 show in Atlanta, Georgia.

The tour ultimately grossed $26 million, covering 39 cities and 41 shows.

== Set list ==
1. "Light Up the Sky"
2. "Runnin' with the Devil"
3. "Romeo Delight"
4. "Everybody Wants Some!!"
5. "Drop Dead Legs"
6. "Feel Your Love Tonight"
7. "Somebody Get Me a Doctor"
8. "She's the Woman"
9. "China Town" (removed from the setlist after the Pelham date)
10. "I'll Wait"
11. Alex Van Halen drum solo ["Drumstruck"]
12. "Little Guitars"
13. "Dance the Night Away"
14. "Beautiful Girls"
15. "Women in Love..."
16. "Hot for Teacher"
17. "In a Simple Rhyme" and "Growth" (removed from the setlist after the Dallas date)
18. "Dirty Movies"
19. "Ice Cream Man"
20. "Unchained"
21. "Ain't Talkin' 'Bout Love"
22. Eddie Van Halen guitar solo [featuring "Little Guitars," "Mean Street" (intros), "Spanish Fly," "Cathedral" and "Eruption"]
23. "You Really Got Me"
24. "Panama"
25. "Jump"

Wolfgang Van Halen revealed some of the tour's setlist on Twitter on July 2, 2015. The full setlist was revealed three days later at the first performance on the tour, at White River Amphitheater in Auburn, Washington. Throughout the tour, the setlist featured songs that had not been played in concert in over three decades, and others that had never been played live before.

== Tour dates ==
Date	City	Country	Venue
July 5, 2015	Auburn	United States	White River Amphitheatre
July 7, 2015	Ridgefield	United States	Amphitheater Northwest
July 9, 2015	Concord	United States	Concord Pavilion
July 11, 2015	San Bernardino	United States	San Manuel Amphitheater
July 14, 2015	Irvine	United States	Irvine Meadows Amphitheatre
July 16, 2015	Mountain View	United States	Shoreline Amphitheatre
July 18, 2015	West Valley City	United States	USANA Amphitheatre
July 20, 2015	Morrison	United States	Red Rocks Amphitheatre
July 22, 2015	Bonner Springs	United States	Cricket Wireless Amphitheater
July 24, 2015	Tinley Park	United States	Hollywood Casino Amphitheatre
July 26, 2015	Maryland Heights	United States	Hollywood Casino Amphitheatre
July 28, 2015	Burgettstown	United States	First Niagara Pavilion
July 30, 2015	Bangor	United States	Darling's Waterfront Pavilion
August 1, 2015	Mansfield	United States	Xfinity Center
August 3, 2015	Cuyahoga Falls	United States	Blossom Music Center
August 5, 2015	London	Canada	Western Fairgrounds
August 7, 2015	Toronto	Canada	Molson Canadian Amphitheatre
August 9, 2015	Holmdel	United States	PNC Bank Arts Center
August 11, 2015	Hartford	United States	Xfinity Theatre
August 13, 2015	Wantagh	United States	Nikon at Jones Beach Theater
August 15, 2015	Wantagh	United States	Nikon at Jones Beach Theater
August 25, 2015	Darien	United States	Darien Lake Performing Arts Center
August 27, 2015	Camden	United States	Susquehanna Bank Center
August 29, 2015	Bristow	United States	Jiffy Lube Live
August 31, 2015	Cincinnati	United States	Riverbend Music Center
September 2, 2015	Noblesville	United States	Klipsch Music Center
September 4, 2015	Clarkston	United States	DTE Energy Music Theatre
September 6, 2015	Bethel	United States	Bethel Woods Center for the Arts
September 9, 2015	Raleigh	United States	Walnut Creek Amphitheatre
September 11, 2015	Charlotte	United States	PNC Music Pavilion
September 13, 2015	Tampa	United States	MidFlorida Credit Union Amphitheatre
September 15, 2015	West Palm Beach	United States	Perfect Vodka Amphitheatre
September 17, 2015	Pelham	United States	Oak Mountain Amphitheatre
September 19, 2015	Atlanta	United States	Music Midtown
September 21, 2015	Austin	United States	Austin360 Amphitheater
September 23, 2015	Dallas	United States	Gexa Energy Pavilion
September 25, 2015	The Woodlands	United States	Cynthia Woods Mitchell Pavilion
September 28, 2015	Phoenix	United States	Ak-Chin Pavilion
September 30, 2015	Chula Vista	United States	Sleep Train Amphitheatre
October 2, 2015	Los Angeles	United States	Hollywood Bowl
October 4, 2015	Los Angeles	United States	Hollywood Bowl

== Gross ==
- Total Gross: $26 million
- Total Attendance: 376,538
- Shows: 39

== Personnel ==
- David Lee Roth – lead vocals
- Eddie Van Halen – guitar, backing vocals
- Wolfgang Van Halen – bass, backing vocals
- Alex Van Halen – drums, percussion
