= Loss of control =

Loss of control may refer to:

- Loss of control (aeronautics), a condition that can lead to an aircraft crash.
- Loss of control (AI), when Artificial Intelligence goes out of human control
- Loss of control defence, a legal partial defence for murder, reducing the conviction to manslaughter
- "Loss of Control", a song by Green Day from the album ¡Uno!
- "Loss of Control", a song by Van Halen from the album Women and Children First
