= A Different Kind of Truth =

2012 studio album by Van Halen

Studio album by Van Halen
- Released: February 7, 2012
- Recorded: November 2010 – August 2011, early January 2012
- Studios: 5150 Studios and Henson Recording Studios, Hollywood, California
- Genres: Hard rock; heavy metal
- Length: 50:12
- Label: Interscope
- Producers: Van Halen; John Shanks

Van Halen chronology
The Best of Both Worlds (2004)	A Different Kind of Truth (2012)	Tokyo Dome Live in Concert (2015)

Singles from A Different Kind of Truth
- 1. "Tattoo" Released: January 10, 2012; 2. "She's the Woman" Released: February 28, 2012

A Different Kind of Truth is the twelfth and final studio album by American rock band Van Halen. Released on February 7, 2012, by Interscope Records, this is Van Halen's only studio album on Interscope and its first album of studio material with lead singer David Lee Roth since 1984. Likewise, A Different Kind of Truth was Van Halen's first studio album since 1998's Van Halen III, as well as their only studio album recorded without bassist Michael Anthony, who had played bass on all of the band's previous albums; Eddie Van Halen's son Wolfgang replaced Anthony for the album, making this his only studio album with the band. It would also be Van Halen's final studio album before Eddie's death and the group's subsequent disbandment in 2020.

A Different Kind of Truth was recorded at Henson Recording Studios and Eddie Van Halen's own 5150 Studios and produced by John Shanks. Seven of the album's 13 songs are musically re-worked and lyrically re-written songs that had been demoed in the late-1970s/early 1980s, but never officially released. The album received positive reviews upon release, with several writers referring to it as a return to form, and multiple publications ranked it as one of the best albums of 2012. It was also a commercial success, debuting in the top ten on numerous record charts. It debuted at No. 2 on the Billboard 200 and, by the end of 2012, had sold in excess of 411,000 copies in the United States alone. The album was promoted with an arena tour.

== Background ==
In 2007, Van Halen reunited with original lead singer David Lee Roth – who had left the band in June 1985, at the peak of their global popularity – for a North American Tour. This tour added bassist Wolfgang Van Halen, the then-16-year-old son of guitarist Eddie Van Halen and actress Valerie Bertinelli, in place of former bassist Michael Anthony, who would go on to form both Chickenfoot and Sammy Hagar and the Circle with Van Halen's second lead singer, Sammy Hagar. The reunion tour consisted of 74 shows from September 2007 to June 2008, and became the band's highest-grossing tour of its thirty-year history, earning over $93 million. Eddie Van Halen was reluctant about the possibility of recording new material with Roth in 2009, citing the poor reaction to the three new songs recorded with Hagar for the 2004 compilation Best of Both Worlds. After Wolfgang became enthusiastic about recording a new Van Halen album, Eddie's opinion changed: "We're doing this [album] for us."

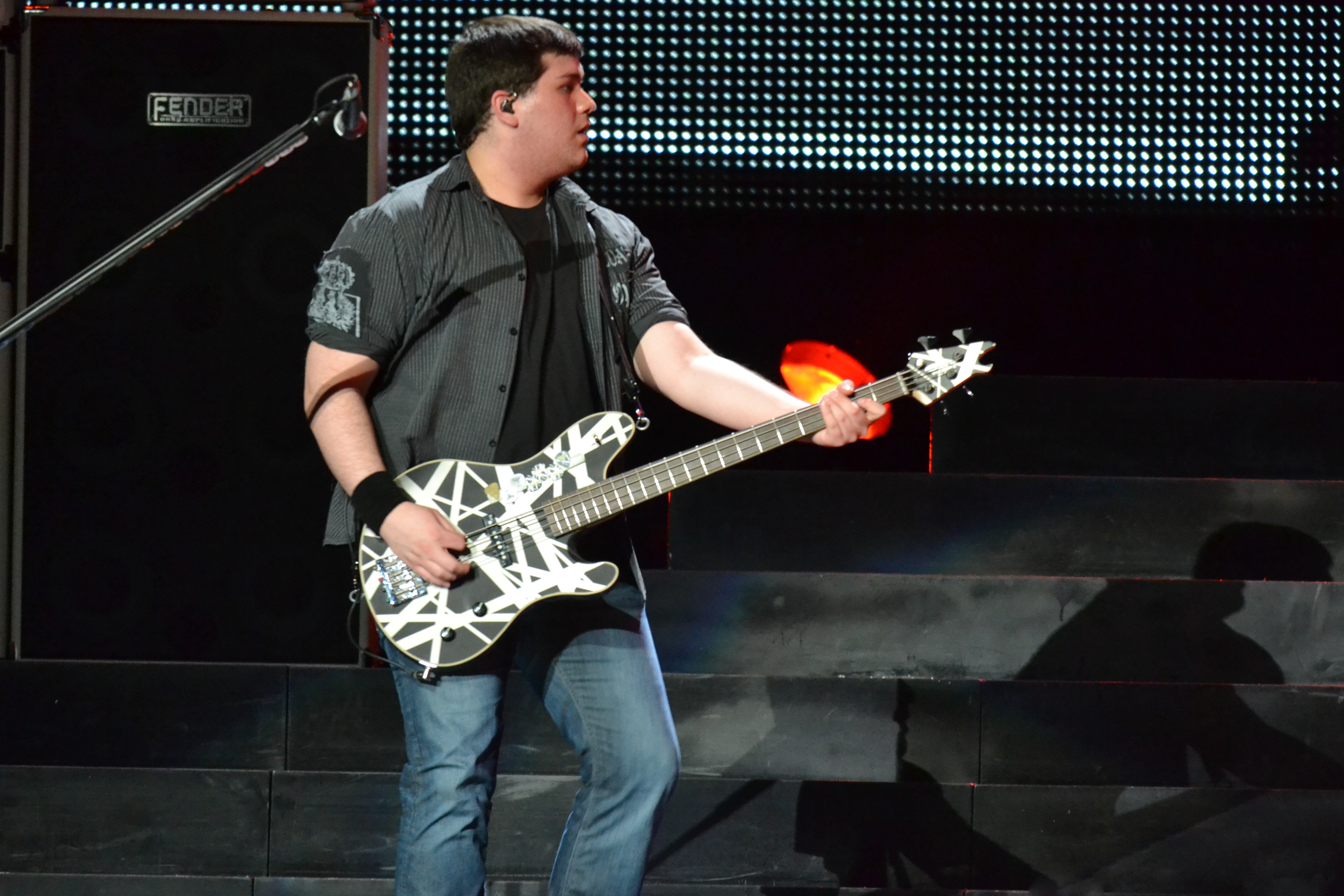
Bassist Wolfgang Van Halen started his work on the album by searching through the band's demo archives.

Eddie, Wolfgang, and Alex Van Halen began jam sessions at the former's 5150 Studios three months after the tour's completion. During this time, Wolfgang discovered rough, unreleased demos from the band's archives. After listening to these and believing they had potential, he brought them to Alex and Eddie to rework and refine. The first of these tracks, "She's the Woman", was completed by August 2009. It had originally been demoed by the band in the mid-1970s. Roth decided to join the project after hearing this song, as well as two other reworked tracks: "Let's Get Rockin'" – later renamed "Outta Space" – and "Bullethead". The demos also included songs originating from an attempted 2000 reunion album with Roth.

Wolfgang's original intention with the album was to create a collection of previously released "B-sides". According to Eddie, this would mean deep album tracks, such as "Drop Dead Legs" and "Girl Gone Bad", along with three reworked demos, with Eddie saying: "It would [have been] a record of our more hardcore songs and none of the pop stuff. That was the initial plan, but the deeper we dug, the more we found. At the same time I was writing new songs. Dave got very excited about that. We all did. We ended up recording demos for 35 songs." After deliberating over whether to self-produce the album or choose a producer from a list that included Rick Rubin and Pat Leonard (who had involvement on their scrapped 1999 album with Gary Cherone), Roth suggested John Shanks. Shanks liked the first three songs and agreed to produce the album, working alongside Wolfgang to pick the demos that would be developed into the album's tracks. While all of Van Halen's albums since 1984 had been produced inside 5150, Roth persuaded the band to work at Henson Recording Studios, where he had been recording for more than a decade.

== Recording and production ==
"I wanted to remind my dad of the mindset he was in when he wrote songs like 'Runnin' with the Devil' and 'Dance the Night Away'. I thought that recording those old songs would make it easier for dad, Dave and Al to put their minds where they were back then and get back to writing how they would have then."

— Wolfgang Van Halen on recording older songs

By mid-January 2011, the band had moved into Henson Studios with Shanks, staff engineer Martin Cooke and engineer Paul David Hager. The band would record music for 12 hours a day, five days a week, with Roth coming in to track his vocals at night. The instrumental tracks were completed within three weeks. Eddie said that he was relieved to relinquish some of the production work to his son, who was considered by the band to be acting in a co-production role: frequently talking to Shanks, being consulted by his father on the musical direction and developing the songs. Along with creating new bits, such as a new breakdown on "She's the Woman"—as the original had ended up being used on Fair Warning's (1981) "Mean Street"—and an arrangement for "Stay Frosty". Wolfgang improvised some bass sections, such as the capo intro to "China Town".

By the end of March 2011, the band returned to finish the record at 5150 with engineer Ross Hogarth. Most of the work at 5150 was for guitars and bass, as Eddie "couldn't hear them at Henson the way I'm used to." Both he and Hogarth felt that attempts at mixing there were not progressing due to sound-quality issues. Eddie attributed this to the tape machines at Henson, claiming that: "Everything ended up sounding like it had a sock over it." The final mix took place over a period of six weeks in the summer of 2011, with each song taking a day to mix. Hogarth indicated that because the process was done at a mixing console, "We couldn't move on to the next song until a mix had been approved by everyone and could go off the desk." Hogarth would start with the drums, adding bass and guitar to finish a backing track, which would be complemented with multing (hiving off different sections of a given part to different tracks) and parallel compression. It was then finished by bringing in Roth's vocals, backing vocals, and further details such as ad libs, screams, and guitar solos.

Hogarth aimed to "bring Ed's guitar sound into the modern era, but maintaining all the DNA of the past." He suggested that the guitar sound be split naturally between stereo channels, instead of separating lead guitar to the left channel and panning effects to the right by using two guitar amplifiers placed far apart. The idea was to have a guitar sound "that was wide and mono, and not digital delay-driven, and it's what you hear on the record, with only a few overdubs." A more-complex structure would be utilized for Wolfgang's bass, as the band wanted "a bass sound that covered the whole spectrum, from high to low and clean to dirty", and his instrument was recorded by up to eight separate microphones. A multi-mic set-up was also employed for Alex's drums, with most of the final drumming coming from overhead microphones. Roth's vocals were all recorded at Henson, without compression.

== Composition and style ==
"She's the Woman"
The second single from the album, "She's the Woman," was first recorded by Van Halen in 1976 as a demo, which was produced by Kiss bassist Gene Simmons.

A Different Kind of Truth was described by Roth as "a sort of collaboration with [Van Halen's] past." Seven of the album's tracks are based on material which Roth suggested dated back to between 1975 and 1977, while Eddie indicated that others had been composed "when I was still in high school and even junior high." "Blood and Fire" dates back to 1984. An instrumental version of the song, titled "Ripley", appeared in Eddie's score for the film The Wild Life. The original title had been inspired by the Ripley guitar used by Eddie on the demo, and he sent that guitar back to Steve Ripley for repair so that it could be used on the album version. According to musician Frank Meyer, who claims to have heard the demo, "Blood and Fire" was one of four songs demoed during a 2000 reunion attempt with Roth and Michael Anthony, along with "As Is", "Honeybabysweetiedoll", and "The Trouble With Never".

Roth rewrote the lyrics for most tracks, as he wanted to incorporate a point of view from his current personal life. He declared that: "All music is autobiographic. Particularly when it's not meant to be," adding that by retooling the songs "there is a body of new that meets halfway there, that I think makes very colorful sense." Only the lead single "Tattoo" contains a synthesizer, which was played by Roth. Two other songs, "You and Your Blues" and "As Is", have a processed guitar that sounds like a synth. Roth also performs acoustic guitar on the intro for "Stay Frosty", a song he had written which was re-arranged by Wolfgang, and is reminiscent of "Ice Cream Man", a John Brim song covered on Van Halen's 1978 debut. Among the effects units used by Eddie on the album were his signature model MXR Phase 90, a Whammy pedal, and a Wah-wah pedal. The latter is prominently featured on the "kind of Hendrix-ish" "The Trouble with Never".

== Release and packaging ==
Van Halen amicably split from long-time label Warner Bros. Records in 2001, although they would later sign a one-record deal with the label shortly afterwards for the 2004 release The Best of Both Worlds. The band briefly entered into negotiations with Columbia Records, but these stalled after Roth indicated he would not sign with the label. In November 2011, the band signed with Interscope Records, after its chairman Jimmy Iovine became personally involved in negotiations.

"Tattoo" was released as the album's lead single on January 10, 2012. One day after its release on iTunes, it was the No. 1 selling rock song in the United States, Canada, Finland and the Netherlands, while also charting in Sweden, Belgium, Germany and the UK. By January 23, the song peaked at No. 1 on Billboard's Hard Rock Singles chart, becoming the No. 1 most played song at classic rock radio, as well as the most added song at mainstream and active rock radio. Two days later, excerpts of both "Tattoo" and "Stay Frosty" were featured on CSI: Crime Scene Investigation.

The album was released on February 7, 2012, in both standard and deluxe edition versions, with the latter containing a bonus DVD titled The Downtown Sessions. This DVD included acoustic versions of "Panama", "You and Your Blues", and "Beautiful Girls". A performance of "You Really Got Me" from this acoustic session was posted online to promote the album. A double gatefold vinyl edition of the album was sold exclusively through Live Nation Entertainment. On February 28, "She's the Woman" was serviced to radio as the second single. Its music video was released online on April 13, and on May 4 a promotional vinyl 7-inch single was serviced to 83 independent record stores to be given with purchases of A Different Kind of Truth. The band members opted to avoid excessive promotional press, an attitude that Roth described as "a sterling statement" on them not following "so many people on television telling you why you should buy something".

The cover artwork was designed by Los Angeles-based Smog Design, following a concept sent by Roth. Smog co-owner John Heiden picked the image, featuring a New York Central Railroad J-3A Dreyfuss Hudson steam locomotive, photographed by Robert Yarnall Richie, from the Southern Methodist University's photo library, stating he chose it because "Richie's angle on the photo makes it look like the locomotive is in motion and coming off the page." Aside from the reversed angle of the train, the artwork shares similarities to the 1975 Commodores album Movin' On. The booklet includes Roth's hand-written lyrics for the songs. Regarding the title, Eddie stated that he liked it because "there's always their reality of what other people think, and there's just the different kind of truth, which is the real truth."

On September 3, 2026, it was announced that A Different Kind of Truth would be rereleased on October 23, on both CD, as well as a 2LP set pressed on 180-gram vinyl in a double gatefold package. A limited edition crystal-clear vinyl version is also set to be released to indie retail stores.

== Tour ==
After performing three warm-up shows at Cafe Wha? in New York City, Henson Studios in Hollywood, California, and The Forum in Inglewood, California, Van Halen began their A Different Kind of Truth Tour in Louisville, Kentucky on February 18. This tour consisted of 46 shows, ending on June 26 in New Orleans, and was the eighth-most-lucrative concert tour of 2012, with a total gross of $54,425,548 and attendance of 522,296. A second North American leg was cancelled, with the band claiming exhaustion. This was followed by the postponement of three Japanese concerts, as Eddie underwent emergency surgery to treat diverticulitis.

In 2013, Van Halen performed the rescheduled Japanese concerts, along with headlining gigs at three festivals: Stone Music Festival in Sydney (the band's first concert in Australia since 1998), Rock USA at Ford Festival Park in Oshkosh, Wisconsin, and the California Mid-State Fair in Paso Robles.

== Reception ==
Professional ratings
Review scores
Source	Rating
AllMusic	4/5 stars
The A.V. Club	B
Boston Herald	A−
Chicago Tribune	2.5/4 stars
Entertainment Weekly	A−
The Guardian	4/5 stars
Rolling Stone	3.5/5 stars
Spin	7/10
Sputnikmusic	3.5/5 stars
USA Today	3.5/4 stars

Upon its release, A Different Kind of Truth received positive reviews from music critics. At Metacritic, which assigns a normalized rating out of 100 to reviews from mainstream critics, the album received an average score of 73, based on 21 reviews, indicating "generally favorable reviews". It also holds an aggregate score of 6.9 out of 10 at AnyDecentMusic?, based on 16 reviews.

The Guardian gave the album four stars out of a possible five, calling it was a "frequently thrilling return" with songs that "crackle, fizz, and bulge with priapic exuberance". Likewise, AllMusic writer Stephen Thomas Erlewine rated the album four stars out of five and wrote: "Van Halen are using their history to revive their present and they succeed surprisingly well on A Different Kind of Truth." The A.V. Club's Steven Hyden stated, "After so many years of fumbling dysfunction that reduced the once-proud Van Halen name to a laughingstock, A Different Kind Of Truth matters because it's a reminder of why this band mattered," while noting that, "Roth deserves some of the credit for that. For whatever reason, when Roth is in the band, Eddie Van Halen plays guitar like the world wants him to play guitar." Rolling Stone gave the album 3.5 out of 5 stars, with critic Rob Sheffield stating, "Van Halen's 'heard you missed us, we're back' album is not only the most long-awaited reunion joint in the history of reunion joints, it is—against all reasonable expectations—a real Van Halen album."

William Clark of Guitar International gave the album a positive review, and said that the record features "some of the most elaborate, expansive, and simply wowing guitar playing that Eddie has passionately poured into a single album". Spin wrote, "the frantic, haute-for-teacher 'As Is' and the mid-tempo shoulda-been-the-single 'You and Your Blues' can hang with any heavy-breathing romp they made in their heyday." Jerry Shriver of USA Today gave the album 3.5/4 stars, saying that "this is the true kick in the butt that arena rock desperately needs". However, in the newspaper's year-end retrospective, Edna Gundersen listed A Different Kind of Truth among the overrated albums of 2012, stating that "the reheated meat-and-potato riffs of Van Halen's past had critics swooning and fans panting, but vanished from the charts after the band's tour was scrapped" and the album got shut out of Grammy Award nominations. Guitar World picked A Different Kind of Truth as the best album of 2012. Rolling Stone named "Stay Frosty" the 16th best song of 2012, and the magazine's readers ranked it the fifth best album of the year.

The record was also a commercial success. A Different Kind of Truth entered the US Billboard 200 at No. 2, selling 188,000 copies in its first six days of release, becoming the group's 14th consecutive top ten album in the US. By the end of 2012, the album had sold 411,000 copies in the US, making it the 71st best-selling record of the year, and the third highest-selling hard rock album. The record also debuted at No. 6 on the UK Albums Chart with first-week sales of 14,040 copies, making it their highest-charting album ever in the country. In Japan, it debuted at No. 3 on the Oricon chart, and was one of the few albums by western artists to appear on their year-end tally, finishing at number 89 with 79,517 copies sold.

After A Different Kind of Truth was removed from streaming platforms in October 2022, Wolfgang Van Halen accused Roth of holding up negotiations to renew its streaming contract because the singer did not like the album. Roth responded with a mocking video stating he indeed does not think highly of the album — "Do you remember Leon Spinks? How about Larry Holmes or Trevor Berbick? Well, these were the last couple of Muhammad Ali's fights, and nobody wants to remember them because they were no fun... And your albums with Van Halen are a lot like those last two fights." — and adding that none of the streaming services were willing to pay what he and Alex Van Halen were asking for its renewal. The album returned to streaming platforms in June 2024 with no further elaboration on the matter.

== Track listing ==
All tracks are written by Edward Van Halen, David Lee Roth, Alex Van Halen, and Wolfgang Van Halen.

A Different Kind of Truth track listing
No.	Title	Length
1.	"Tattoo"	4:44
2.	"She's the Woman"	2:57
3.	"You and Your Blues"	3:43
4.	"China Town"	3:14
5.	"Blood and Fire"	4:26
6.	"Bullethead"	2:30
7.	"As Is"	4:47
8.	"Honeybabysweetiedoll"	3:46
9.	"The Trouble with Never"	4:00
10.	"Outta Space"	2:53
11.	"Stay Frosty"	4:06
12.	"Big River"	3:50
13.	"Beats Workin'"	5:02
Total length:		50:12

The Downtown Sessions – Deluxe edition DVD
No.	Title	Length
1.	"Panama"	5:33
2.	"You and Your Blues (Intro)"	3:20
3.	"You and Your Blues"	3:32
4.	"Beautiful Girls"	3:41
Total length:		16:11

== Personnel ==
Van Halen

- David Lee Roth – lead vocals, synthesizer on "Tattoo", acoustic guitar on "Stay Frosty"
- Edward Van Halen – guitar, backing vocals
- Wolfgang Van Halen – bass, backing vocals
- Alex Van Halen – drums

Production

- Van Halen – producers, mixing
- John Shanks – producer
- Martin Cooke – engineering
- Ross Hogarth – mixing
- Dan Chase – digital editing
- Paul David Hager – assistant engineer
- Peter Stanislaus – assistant engineer
- Bernie Grundman – mastering
- Marc VanGool – guitar and studio technician
- DeGolyer Library, SMU – cover image courtesy
- George Hernandez – inner sleeve design
- Robert Y. Richie Collection – cover image courtesy
- Smog Design – album cover

== Charts ==
=== Weekly charts ===
Chart (2012–2026)	Peak position
Australian Albums (ARIA)	4
Austrian Albums (Ö3 Austria)	17
Belgian Albums (Ultratop Flanders)	51
Belgian Albums (Ultratop Wallonia)	25
Canadian Albums (Billboard)	3
Czech Albums (ČNS IFPI)	9
Danish Albums (Hitlisten)	8
Dutch Albums (Album Top 100)	12
Finnish Albums (Suomen virallinen lista)	3
French Albums (SNEP)	29
German Albums (Offizielle Top 100)	8
Greek Albums (IFPI)	61
Hungarian Albums (MAHASZ)	25
Irish Albums (IRMA)	16
Italian Albums (FIMI)	16
Japanese Albums (Oricon)	3
New Zealand Albums (RMNZ)	14
Norwegian Albums (VG-lista)	9
Scottish Albums (Official Charts)	6
Spanish Albums (Promusicae)	35
Swedish Albums (Sverigetopplistan)	4
Swiss Albums (Schweizer Hitparade)	6
UK Albums (Official Charts)	6
UK Rock & Metal Albums (Official Charts)	1
US Billboard 200	2
US Top Hard Rock Albums (Billboard)	1
US Top Rock Albums (Billboard)	1
US Indie Store Album Sales (Billboard)	1

=== Year-end charts ===
Chart (2012)	Position
Japanese Albums (Oricon)	89
US Billboard 200 (Billboard)	71
US Rock Albums (Billboard)	22
US Hard Rock Albums (Billboard)	3

== Certifications ==
Region	Certification	Certified units/sales
Canada (Music Canada)	Gold	40,000^{^}
^{^} Shipments figures based on certification alone.
