= So This Is Love? (song) =

Single by Van Halen

from the album Fair Warning
- B-side: "Hear About It Later"
- Released: June 1981
- Recorded: 1981
- Studio: Sunset Sound Recorders, Hollywood
- Genre: Hard rock
- Length: 3:06
- Label: Warner Bros.
- Songwriters: Michael Anthony; David Lee Roth; Alex Van Halen; Edward Van Halen
- Producer: Ted Templeman

Van Halen singles chronology
"And the Cradle Will Rock..." (1980)	"So This Is Love?" (1981)	"Unchained" (1981)

"So This Is Love?" is a rock song written by the group Van Halen for their 1981 album Fair Warning. It is one of four singles issued for the album, and is unique among Van Halen songs for being rooted in a swing beat. It peaked at number 110 on the U.S. Billboard Hot 100 and number 15 on the U.S. Mainstream Rock Tracks chart.

Record World said it has "a bit of the blues and lots of hard rock," performed with David Lee Roth's "vocal histrionics" and Eddie Van Halen's "sweaty lead guitar exposition."

Chuck Klosterman of Vulture.com ranked it the 29th-best Van Halen song, noting that it was "Anchored by an unpretentious bass line, 'So This Is Love?' is lyrically confusing, in that the verses of the song express romantic optimism while the title suggests romantic deflation."

A promotional music video was filmed for the song. The video aired on Happy Circus, a show on Italian state television station RAI 1 and was filmed at the Prehistoric Park in Rivolta d'Adda.
