= One Foot Out the Door =

The expression one foot out the door may refer to:

- One Foot Out the Door, a song from Fair Warning (1981), an album by Van Halen.
- One Foot Out the Door, a mixtape by Mike Posner (2009).
