= A Different Kind of Truth Tour =

2012–13 concert tour by Van Halen

- Tour by Van Halen
- Poster to the planned final concert in Tokyo, Japan
- Location: Asia; North America; Oceania
- Associated album: A Different Kind of Truth
- Start date: January 5, 2012
- End date: July 24, 2013
- Legs: 2
- No. of shows: 60

Van Halen concert chronology
- North American Tour (2007–2008); A Different Kind of Truth Tour (2012–2013); North American Tour (2015)

A Different Kind of Truth (or Viva La Van Halen Tour) was a 2012–13 concert tour for hard rock band Van Halen. It was Van Halen's tour in support of their 2012 album, A Different Kind of Truth.

== History ==
On December 26, 2011, the official Van Halen website was updated, announcing that tickets for the 2012 tour would be available starting January 10, 2012. On January 10, the single "Tattoo" premiered on radio stations. The band's new album from Interscope Records, entitled A Different Kind of Truth, was released on February 7.

The band did three warm-up shows – Cafe Wha? in New York City on January 5, 2012, Henson Recording Studios in Hollywood, California on February 1, and The Forum in Inglewood, California on February 8 – before kicking off the North American leg of the tour in Louisville at KFC Yum! Center on February 18. This leg ended on June 26 at New Orleans Arena. Kool & the Gang opened each show (except Uncasville), through the end of June.

Another North American leg was scheduled to begin July 7 and last until September 25, but was postponed and then cancelled due to the band feeling overworked. Ky-Mani Marley was to open each North American show, starting with the July dates.

By mid year 2012, the tour had grossed $44.9 million with 448,506 total tickets sold. This put Van Halen as the number three tour of the year at that point. The band was scheduled to visit Japan for the first time since their 1998 III Tour with Gary Cherone/since 1979 during their "World Vacation Tour" with David Lee Roth, however, due to Eddie Van Halen's emergency surgery for diverticulitis in August 2012, the Asian tour was rescheduled for June 2013, preceded by the band's first Australia show since 1998 at Stadium Australia in Sydney on April 20, 2013.

The band kicked off the Asian leg at Aichi Prefectural Gymnasium in Nagoya on June 18, followed by a show at the Tokyo Dome on June 21 (released as Tokyo Dome Live in Concert) and ending with two shows at Osaka Municipal Central Gymnasium on June 24 and 26. The band finished the tour with two shows at Ford Festival Park in Oshkosh, Wisconsin for the "Rock USA Festival" on July 20 and at Chumash Grandstand Arena in Paso Robles, California for the "California Mid-State Fair" on July 24.

"I'm happy now when somebody sends me a video of those guys in concert," remarked former singer Sammy Hagar, "and I see Eddie's playing good again. I wish that would have been the guy that did the 2004 tour. If it was, we probably still would have been together."

== Tour dates ==
List of 2012 concerts
| Date | City | Country | Venue |
|---|---|---|---|
| January 5, 2012 | New York City | United States | Cafe Wha? |
| February 1, 2012 | Los Angeles | United States | Henson Recording Studios |
| February 8, 2012 | Inglewood | United States | The Forum |
| February 18, 2012 | Louisville | United States | KFC Yum! Center |
| February 20, 2012 | Auburn Hills | United States | The Palace of Auburn Hills |
| February 22, 2012 | Indianapolis | United States | Bankers Life Fieldhouse |
| February 24, 2012 | Chicago | United States | United Center |
| ~~February 26, 2012~~ | ~~Rosemont~~ | United States | ~~Allstate Arena~~ |
| February 28, 2012 | New York City | United States | Madison Square Garden |
| March 1, 2012 | New York City | United States | Madison Square Garden |
| March 3, 2012 | Uncasville | United States | Mohegan Sun Arena |
| March 5, 2012 | Philadelphia | United States | Wells Fargo Center |
| ~~March 7, 2012~~ | ~~Rochester~~ | United States | ~~Blue Cross Arena~~ |
| March 9, 2012 | Buffalo | United States | First Niagara Center |
| March 11, 2012 | Boston | United States | TD Garden |
| March 13, 2012 | Manchester | United States | Verizon Wireless Arena |
| March 15, 2012 | Montreal | Canada | Centre Bell |
| March 17, 2012 | Toronto | Canada | Air Canada Centre |
| ~~March 19, 2012~~ | ~~London~~ | Canada | ~~John Labatt Centre~~ |
| March 21, 2012 | Ottawa | Canada | Scotiabank Place |
| March 24, 2012 | Atlantic City | United States | Boardwalk Hall |
| March 26, 2012 | ~~University Park~~ | United States | ~~Bryce Jordan Center~~ |
| March 26, 2012 | Reading | United States | Sovereign Center |
| March 28, 2012 | Washington, D.C. | United States | Verizon Center |
| March 30, 2012 | Pittsburgh | United States | Consol Energy Center |
| April 1, 2012 | Rosemont | United States | Allstate Arena |
| April 10, 2012 | Sunrise | United States | BankAtlantic Center |
| April 12, 2012 | Orlando | United States | Amway Center |
| April 14, 2012 | Tampa | United States | Tampa Bay Times Forum |
| April 16, 2012 | Jacksonville | United States | Jacksonville Veterans Memorial Arena |
| April 19, 2012 | Atlanta | United States | Philips Arena |
| April 21, 2012 | Greensboro | United States | Greensboro Coliseum |
| ~~April 23, 2012~~ | ~~Baltimore~~ | United States | ~~1st Mariner Arena~~ |
| April 25, 2012 | Charlotte | United States | Time Warner Cable Arena |
| April 27, 2012 | Nashville | United States | Bridgestone Arena |
| April 29, 2012 | St. Louis | United States | Scottrade Center |
| May 1, 2012 | Tulsa | United States | BOK Center |
| ~~May 3, 2012~~ | ~~Salt Lake City~~ | United States | ~~EnergySolutions Arena~~ |
| May 5, 2012 | Tacoma | United States | Tacoma Dome |
| May 7, 2012 | Vancouver | Canada | Rogers Arena |
| May 9, 2012 | Calgary | Canada | Scotiabank Saddledome |
| May 11, 2012 | Edmonton | Canada | Rexall Place |
| May 13, 2012 | Winnipeg | Canada | MTS Centre |
| May 16, 2012 | Orlando | United States | Amway Center (Private SAP show) |
| May 19, 2012 | Saint Paul | United States | Xcel Energy Center |
| May 22, 2012 | Kansas City | United States | Sprint Center |
| May 24, 2012 | Denver | United States | Pepsi Center |
| May 27, 2012 | Las Vegas | United States | MGM Grand Garden Arena |
| ~~May 29, 2012~~ | ~~Reno~~ | United States | ~~Reno Events Center~~ |
| June 1, 2012 | Los Angeles | United States | Staples Center |
| June 3, 2012 | Oakland | United States | Oracle Arena |
| June 5, 2012 | San Jose | United States | HP Pavilion at San Jose |
| ~~June 7, 2012~~ | ~~Fresno~~ | United States | ~~Save Mart Center~~ |
| June 9, 2012 | Los Angeles | United States | Staples Center |
| June 12, 2012 | Anaheim | United States | Honda Center |
| June 14, 2012 | San Diego | United States | Viejas Arena |
| June 16, 2012 | Phoenix | United States | US Airways Center |
| ~~June 18, 2012~~ | ~~Albuquerque~~ | United States | ~~Tingley Coliseum~~ |
| June 20, 2012 | Dallas | United States | American Airlines Center |
| June 22, 2012 | San Antonio | United States | AT&T Center |
| June 24, 2012 | Houston | United States | Toyota Center |
| June 26, 2012 | New Orleans | United States | New Orleans Arena |

List of 2013 concerts
| Date | City | Country | Venue |
|---|---|---|---|
| April 20, 2013 ^{[A]} | Sydney | Australia | Stadium Australia |
| June 18, 2013 | Nagoya | Japan | Aichi Prefectural Gymnasium |
| June 21, 2013 | Tokyo | Japan | Tokyo Dome (Tokyo Dome Live in Concert) |
| June 24, 2013 | Osaka | Japan | Osaka Municipal Central Gymnasium |
| June 26, 2013 | Osaka | Japan | Osaka Municipal Central Gymnasium |
| July 20, 2013 ^{[B]} | Oshkosh | United States | Ford Festival Park (Rock USA Festival) |
| July 24, 2013 ^{[C]} | Paso Robles | United States | Chumash Grandstand Arena (California Mid-State Fair) |

=== Information ===
- Top 200 North American Tours 2012: #8
- Total Gross: US $49.9 million
- Total Attendance: 485,172
- No. of concerts: 50

Festivals and other miscellaneous performances

^{A} This concert is a part of the Stone Music Festival
^{B} This concert is a part of the Rock USA Festival
^{C} This concert is a part of the California Mid-State Fair

A full private show for SAP was played at Orlando Amway Center on May 16, 2012.

=== Cancellations ===
Shows

| March 26, 2012 | University Park, Pennsylvania | Bryce Jordan Center | Event cancelled by promoter for undisclosed reasons |

| Date | City | Country | Venue |
|---|---|---|---|
| ~~July 7, 2012~~ | ~~Uncasville~~ | ~~United States~~ | ~~Mohegan Sun Arena~~ |
| ~~July 9, 2012~~ | ~~Hampton~~ | ~~United States~~ | ~~Hampton Coliseum~~ |
| ~~July 11, 2012~~ | ~~Philadelphia~~ | ~~United States~~ | ~~Wells Fargo Center~~ |
| ~~July 13, 2012~~ | ~~East Rutherford~~ | ~~United States~~ | ~~Meadowlands Arena~~ |
| ~~July 15, 2012~~ | ~~Baltimore~~ | ~~United States~~ | ~~1st Mariner Arena~~ |
| ~~July 17, 2012~~ | ~~Rochester~~ | ~~United States~~ | ~~Blue Cross Arena~~ |
| ~~July 19, 2012~~ | ~~Detroit~~ | ~~United States~~ | ~~Joe Louis Arena~~ |
| ~~July 21, 2012~~ | ~~London~~ | ~~Canada~~ | ~~John Labatt Centre~~ |
| ~~July 24, 2012~~ | ~~Toledo~~ | ~~United States~~ | ~~Huntington Center~~ |
| ~~July 26, 2012~~ | ~~Grand Rapids~~ | ~~United States~~ | ~~Van Andel Arena~~ |
| ~~July 28, 2012~~ | ~~Cleveland~~ | ~~United States~~ | ~~Quicken Loans Arena~~ |
| ~~July 31, 2012~~ | ~~Fort Wayne~~ | ~~United States~~ | ~~Allen County War Memorial Coliseum~~ |
| ~~August 2, 2012~~ | ~~Columbus~~ | ~~United States~~ | ~~Value City Arena~~ |
| ~~August 4, 2012~~ | ~~Knoxville~~ | ~~United States~~ | ~~Thompson–Boling Arena~~ |
| ~~August 6, 2012~~ | ~~Memphis~~ | ~~United States~~ | ~~FedExForum~~ |
| ~~August 8, 2012~~ | ~~Birmingham~~ | ~~United States~~ | ~~Legacy Arena~~ |
| ~~August 10, 2012~~ | ~~Greenville~~ | ~~United States~~ | ~~BI-LO Center~~ |
| ~~August 12, 2012~~ | ~~Cincinnati~~ | ~~United States~~ | ~~U.S. Bank Arena~~ |
| ~~August 21, 2012~~ | ~~Spokane~~ | ~~United States~~ | ~~Spokane Veterans Memorial Arena~~ |
| ~~August 23, 2012~~ | ~~Portland~~ | ~~United States~~ | ~~Rose Garden~~ |
| ~~August 25, 2012~~ | ~~Sacramento~~ | ~~United States~~ | ~~Power Balance Pavilion~~ |
| ~~August 28, 2012~~ | ~~Fresno~~ | ~~United States~~ | ~~Save Mart Center~~ |
| ~~August 30, 2012~~ | ~~Reno~~ | ~~United States~~ | ~~Reno Events Center~~ |
| ~~September 1, 2012~~ | ~~Las Vegas~~ | ~~United States~~ | ~~Mandalay Bay Events Center~~ |
| ~~September 4, 2012~~ | ~~Salt Lake City~~ | ~~United States~~ | ~~Energy Solutions Arena~~ |
| ~~September 6, 2012~~ | ~~Tucson~~ | ~~United States~~ | ~~Tucson Arena~~ |
| ~~September 8, 2012~~ | ~~Albuquerque~~ | ~~United States~~ | ~~Tingleu Coliseum~~ |
| ~~September 11, 2012~~ | ~~El Paso~~ | ~~United States~~ | ~~Don Haskins Center~~ |
| ~~September 13, 2012~~ | ~~Austin~~ | ~~United States~~ | ~~Frank Erwin Center~~ |
| ~~September 15, 2012~~ | ~~Oklahoma City~~ | ~~United States~~ | ~~Chesapeake Energy Arena~~ |
| ~~September 17, 2012~~ | ~~Wichita~~ | ~~United States~~ | ~~Intrust Bank Arena~~ |
| ~~September 19, 2012~~ | ~~Omaha~~ | ~~United States~~ | ~~Century Link Arena~~ |
| ~~September 21, 2012~~ | ~~Moline~~ | ~~United States~~ | ~~iWireless Center~~ |
| ~~September 23, 2012~~ | ~~Ashwaubenon~~ | ~~United States~~ | ~~Resch Center~~ |
| ~~September 25, 2012~~ | ~~Milwaukee~~ | ~~United States~~ | ~~BMO Harris Bradley Center~~ |
| ~~November 20, 2012~~ | ~~Osaka~~ | ~~Japan~~ | ~~Osaka Municipal Central Gymnasium~~ |
| ~~November 22, 2012~~ | ~~Osaka~~ | ~~Japan~~ | ~~Osaka Municipal Central Gymnasium~~ |
| ~~November 25, 2012~~ | ~~Nagoya~~ | ~~Japan~~ | ~~Aichi Prefectural Gymnasium~~ |
| ~~November 27, 2012~~ | ~~Tokyo~~ | ~~Japan~~ | ~~Tokyo Dome~~ |

== Personnel ==
- David Lee Roth – lead vocals, guitar
- Eddie Van Halen – lead guitar, backing vocals
- Wolfgang Van Halen – electric bass guitar, backing vocals
- Alex Van Halen – drums, percussion

Additional musician

- Alan Fitzgerald - keyboards/synthesizers (offstage)
