= She's the Woman =

Single by Van Halen

from the album A Different Kind of Truth
- B-side: "Brown M&M's"
- Released: February 28, 2012
- Recorded: 2011
- Genre: Hard rock
- Length: 2:57
- Label: Interscope
- Songwriters: Eddie Van Halen; David Lee Roth; Alex Van Halen; Wolfgang Van Halen
- Producers: Van Halen; John Shanks

Van Halen singles chronology
"Tattoo" (2012)	"She's the Woman" (2012)

Audio sample
- "She's the Woman": file; help

Music video
- She's the Woman on YouTube

"She's the Woman" is the second song and single from the album, A Different Kind of Truth, from American hard rock band Van Halen. The single was released online and to radio stations February 28, 2012. This is the band's last official single as a result of guitarist Eddie Van Halen's death in October 2020.

== History ==
The song dates back to a demo written in 1976. A version of it was on the demo produced by Gene Simmons that landed Van Halen a record deal with Warner Bros. Records.

In 2009, bassist Wolfgang Van Halen, son of guitarist Eddie Van Halen, picked up the tapes for the song from the 5150 Studios archives looking for tracks to record with his father and his uncle, drummer Alex Van Halen. A demo was done in August 2009, and some time later Eddie sent Pro Tools files of "She's the Woman", “Bullethead” and “Let’s Get Rockin’” — later retitled “Outta Space" — to singer David Lee Roth, who enjoyed the tracks and decided to join their project of a new Van Halen record.

The song was one of six new songs in the 2012 album A Different Kind of Truth that originated from older material, making it one of the more prototypical Van Halen songs on the album.

As the original guitar solo ended up becoming the breakdown in 1981's “Mean Street", Wolfgang came up with a new breakdown "that had these crazy chord changes", leading Eddie to carefully plan out a new solo, the first time he had done so since "Runnin' with the Devil". Roth re-wrote the verse lyrics but kept the title and chorus the same.

== Release ==
Released as a single on February 28, 2012, through Interscope Records, it peaked at No. 31 on the Billboard Rock Songs chart. A promotional vinyl 7-inch single was serviced to 83 indie stores to be given with purchases of A Different Kind of Truth. The B-side is an interview, "Brown M&M's", about the band's infamous contract rider requesting a bowl with M&M's, none of which could be brown. The music video was released on Van Halen's official website on April 13, 2012.

== Personnel ==
- David Lee Roth – lead vocals
- Eddie Van Halen – guitar, backing vocals
- Alex Van Halen – drums
- Wolfgang Van Halen – bass guitar, backing vocals

== Charts ==
=== Weekly charts ===
Chart (2012)	Peak position
US Hot Rock & Alternative Songs (Billboard)	31

=== Year-end charts ===
Chart (2012)	Position
US Hot Rock Songs (Billboard)	100
