= Tattoo (Van Halen song) =

2012 single by Van Halen

Single by Van Halen

from the album A Different Kind of Truth
- Released: January 10, 2012
- Recorded: 2011
- Genre: Hard rock
- Length: 4:44
- Label: Interscope
- Songwriters: Eddie Van Halen; David Lee Roth; Alex Van Halen; Wolfgang Van Halen
- Producers: Van Halen; John Shanks

Van Halen singles chronology
"Up for Breakfast" (2004)	"Tattoo" (2012)	"She's the Woman" (2012)

Music video
- Tattoo on YouTube

"Tattoo" is the first song and single from the album, A Different Kind of Truth, from American rock band Van Halen. The single was released online and to radio stations on January 10, 2012. It was the band's first single to be released on Interscope Records, the first single to feature new bassist Wolfgang Van Halen — Eddie's son — and the first to feature original lead vocalist David Lee Roth since "Hot for Teacher".

== History ==
The song's structure is largely based on "Down in Flames", written in 1977 and performed live by Van Halen during their club days and their first world tour in 1978. When the band decided to cover Clint Ballard Jr.'s song "You're No Good" for their second album, Van Halen II, they incorporated the intro from "Down in Flames" as the intro to their arrangement.

A version of the song was worked on during the aborted 2001 reunion with Roth according to Ray Luzier.

"Tattoo" became Van Halen's first single to chart on the American Billboard Hot 100 in 17 years, and their 23rd overall.

== Music video ==
The music video was shot at the Roxy Theatre, Sunset Strip in West Hollywood, California while rehearsing for their then-upcoming tour in late 2011. Their performance was shot in black and white and starts with a big waving checkered racing flag and ending with a hail of confetti and balloons. The song also features reverse effects and other computer special effects. It is their first music video with David Lee Roth in almost 30 years, their first music video without Michael Anthony, and their first featuring Wolfgang Van Halen. The video was uploaded to YouTube on January 10, 2012, the same day of the single's release.

== Release ==
A 30-second "teaser" clip of the song was posted on January 6, 2012. The official single release was announced as January 10 after Van Halen played an intimate club gig at the Cafe Wha?

== Personnel ==
- David Lee Roth – lead vocals, synthesizer
- Eddie Van Halen – guitar, backing vocals
- Alex Van Halen – drums
- Wolfgang Van Halen – bass, backing vocals

== Chart positions ==
Chart (2012)	Peak position
Canada (Canadian Hot 100)	62
Japan Hot 100 (Billboard)	14
US Billboard Hot 100	67
US Billboard Rock Songs	16
