= And the Cradle Will Rock... =

Single by Van Halen

from the album Women and Children First
- B-side: "Could This Be Magic?" (U.S./Japan); "Everybody Wants Some!!" (UK)
- Released: April 1980 (US)
- Recorded: December 1979 – February 1980
- Studio: Sunset Sound Recorders, Hollywood
- Genre: Hard rock
- Length: 3:31
- Label: Warner Bros.
- Songwriters: Michael Anthony; David Lee Roth; Alex Van Halen; Edward Van Halen
- Producer: Ted Templeman

Van Halen singles chronology
| "Somebody Get Me a Doctor" (1979) | "And the Cradle Will Rock..." (1980) | "So This Is Love?" (1981) |

Audio
- "And the Cradle Will Rock..." on YouTube

"And the Cradle Will Rock..." is a song written and performed by Van Halen. It appears on their 1980 album Women and Children First and was released as a single. It is also the first song to feature Eddie Van Halen playing keyboards.

== Composition ==
The song begins with what sounds like a guitar, but is, in fact, a flanger-effected Wurlitzer electric piano played through Eddie Van Halen's 1960s model 100-watt Marshall Plexi amplifier.

During live performances on the 1980 tour, Michael Anthony would play the keyboards.

== Reception ==
Cash Box called the song a "tongue-in-cheek anthem," saying that "David Lee Roth's acrobatic vocal leaps are in fine form," that Eddie Van Halen provides "sonic lead guitar blasts" and that the song has "industrial strength rhythms."

Chuck Klosterman ranked it the 50th-best Van Halen song, writing "I’ve always found it a bit ponderous and uncompromisingly average, but I’ve also listened to it somewhere in the vicinity of 8,000 times."

Eric Carr of Kiss played "And the Cradle Will Rock..." along with Van Halen's cover of "You Really Got Me" as part of his audition tape, which successfully led to his becoming the new drummer for Kiss.

== Charts ==
| Chart (1980) | Peak position |
|---|---|
| Canada (RPM) | 81 |
| US Billboard Hot 100 | 55 |
