= Unchained (song) =

Single by Van Halen

from the album Fair Warning
- B-side: "Push Comes to Shove" "So This Is Love?" (Japan)
- Released: July 1981
- Studio: Sunset Sound (Hollywood)
- Genre: Hard rock
- Length: 3:29
- Label: Warner Bros.
- Songwriters: Michael Anthony; David Lee Roth; Alex Van Halen; Edward Van Halen
- Producer: Ted Templeman

Van Halen singles chronology
| "So This Is Love?" (1981) | "Unchained" (1981) | "(Oh) Pretty Woman" (1982) |

Music videos
- "Unchained" on YouTube

"Unchained" is a song by American rock band Van Halen. It was released as a single from their fourth studio album, Fair Warning (1981).

== Writing and composition ==
Vocalist David Lee Roth's working title for the song was "Hit the Ground Running." The song features prominent use of the MXR M-117 flanger, which became a popular sound and spurred sales of the pedal. A preset for the flanger was also included on the EVH Flanger MXR pedal. It uses a Drop D♭ tuning with suspended fourth chords interspersed. The song is producer Ted Templeman's only vocal contribution to the band, when he says "Come on, Dave, give me a break!" during the interlude of the song.

== Reception ==
A 2011 Rolling Stone reader's poll placed the song at number one on a list of the 10 best Van Halen songs.

Chuck Klosterman of Vulture.com named it the second-best Van Halen song, writing that it "merely feels like insatiable straight-ahead rock, but the lick is freaky, obliquely hovering above the foundation while the drums oscillate between two unrelated performance philosophies."
