= Everybody Wants Some!! (song) =

Song by Van Halen

from the album Women and Children First
- A-side: "And the Cradle Will Rock..."
- B-side: "Everybody Wants Some!!"
- Released: April 1980
- Recorded: December 1979 – February 1980
- Genre: Hard rock; heavy metal
- Length: 5:08
- Label: Warner Bros.
- Songwriters: Michael Anthony, Alex Van Halen, Eddie Van Halen, David Lee Roth.
- Producer: Ted Templeman

"Everybody Wants Some!!" is a song by the American hard rock band Van Halen. It is the second track from their 1980 album Women and Children First. It is one of the band's most popular songs, starting as a concert highlight throughout the band's early career.

Chuck Klosterman of Vulture.com ranked it the 36th-best Van Halen song, writing that "Roth’s improvised rap is lascivious and fetishistic."

== Composition ==
The song is rife with experimental features including a "jungle" drum and Tarzan-like vocal introduction and some new guitar playing techniques from guitarist Eddie Van Halen. The drum-vocal interlude or breakdown section has an improvised feel, with Roth ad-libbing conversational dialogue; for example, he begins the section by saying “I like…” before being cut off by Eddie striking a guitar chord, then finishes "I like the way the line runs up the back of the stockings". At the very end of the song, Roth quips, "Look, I'll pay you for it."

The song was a staple on all of the tours with Roth, following its release. Often, the band would stop in the middle of the song and Roth would chat with the crowd for several minutes before finishing the song. In later years, with their later lead singers, Van Halen would use the opening drum beat from this song as an introduction into "Panama."

== In popular culture ==
- The song appeared in the 1985 comedy Better Off Dead in a humorous Claymation scene. Other film appearances include the 2001 comedy Joe Dirt, the 2009 horror-comedy Zombieland, and Richard Linklater's 2016 film Everybody Wants Some!! (2016).
- The 1999 Judd Apatow-produced comedy Freaks and Geeks featured the song in episode 9, "We've Got Spirit".
