= Van Halen =

American rock band (1972–1999; 2003–2020)

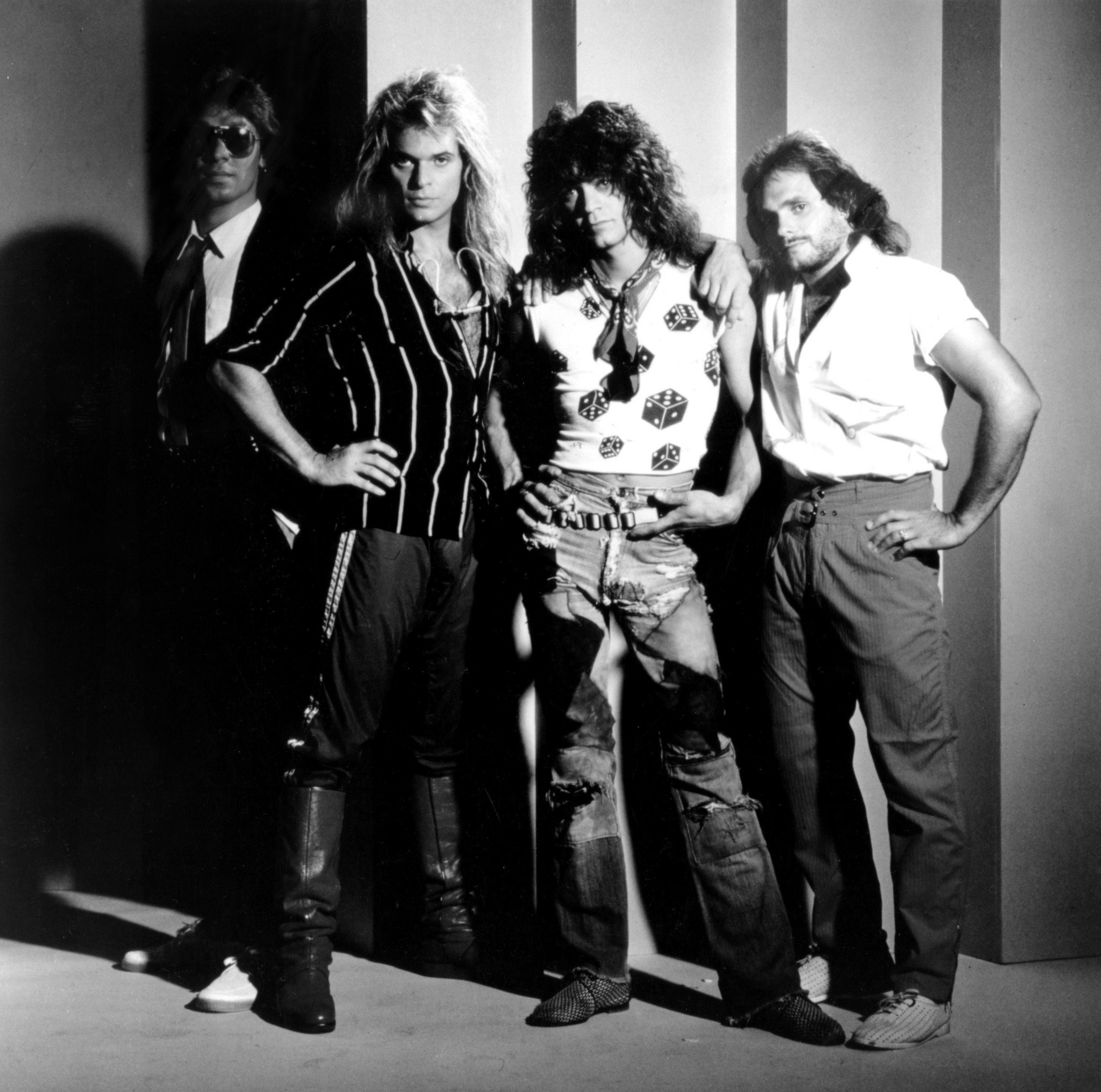
- Van Halen in 1984; (L–R): Alex Van Halen, David Lee Roth, Eddie Van Halen, and Michael Anthony

Background information
- Also known as: Genesis; Mammoth (early)
- Origin: Pasadena, California, U.S.
- Genres: Hard rock; heavy metal; pop rock; glam metal
- Works: Van Halen discography
- Years active: 1972–1999; 2003–2020
- Labels: Warner Bros.; Interscope
- Spinoffs: Mammoth
- Past members: Eddie Van Halen; Alex Van Halen; Mark Stone; David Lee Roth; Michael Anthony; Sammy Hagar; Gary Cherone; Wolfgang Van Halen
- Website: van-halen.com

Van Halen (/væn ˈheɪlən/ van HAY-len) was an American rock band formed in Pasadena, California, in 1972. Credited with restoring hard rock to the forefront of the music scene, Van Halen was known for their energetic live performances and the virtuosity of their guitarist, Eddie Van Halen.

From 1974 to 1985, Van Halen consisted of guitarist, keyboardist, backing vocalist and primary songwriter Eddie Van Halen, his older brother, drummer Alex Van Halen, lead vocalist David Lee Roth, and bassist Michael Anthony. Released in February 1978, the band's self-titled debut album reached No. 19 on the Billboard 200 the following month, and 18 years later, in 1996, had sold over 10 million copies in the United States, achieving a Diamond certification by the Recording Industry Association of America (RIAA). By 1982, the band had released four more albums: Van Halen II (1979), Women and Children First (1980), Fair Warning (1981), and Diver Down (1982), all of which have over time been certified multi-platinum. By the early 1980s, Van Halen was among the most commercially successful rock acts. The album 1984, released in January 1984, was a commercial success with, by February 1999, U.S. sales of 10 million copies and four successful singles. Its lead single, "Jump", was the band's only number-one single on the Billboard Hot 100.

In 1985, Roth left the band to embark on a solo career and was replaced by former Montrose lead vocalist Sammy Hagar. With Hagar, the group released four U.S. number-one, multi-platinum albums over the course of 11 years: 5150 in 1986, OU812 in 1988, For Unlawful Carnal Knowledge in 1991, and Balance in 1995. The group released a double-platinum live album, Live: Right Here, Right Now, in 1993. Hagar left the band in 1996, shortly before the release of the band's first greatest-hits collection, Best Of – Volume I. Former Extreme frontman Gary Cherone replaced Hagar and recorded the commercially unsuccessful album Van Halen III with the band in 1998, before the two parted ways in 1999. Van Halen went on hiatus until reuniting with Hagar in 2003 for a worldwide tour in 2004 and the double-disc greatest hits collection, The Best of Both Worlds (2004). Hagar left Van Halen again after the 2004 tour. Roth returned in 2006, but Anthony was replaced on bass guitar by Eddie's son, Wolfgang Van Halen. In 2012, the band released their final studio album, A Different Kind of Truth, which was critically and commercially successful. It was also the band's first album with Roth in 28 years and the only one to feature Wolfgang. Eddie was diagnosed with cancer in 2001 and died of the disease on October 6, 2020. A month after his father's death, Wolfgang confirmed that Van Halen had disbanded.

As of March 2019, Van Halen is 20th on the RIAA's list of best-selling artists in the United States; the band has sold 56 million albums in the U.S. and more than 80 million worldwide, making them one of the best-selling groups of all time. As of 2007, Van Halen is one of only five rock bands with two studio albums to sell more than 10 million copies in the United States and is tied for the most multi-platinum albums by an American band. Additionally, Van Halen has charted 13 number-one hits on Billboard's Mainstream Rock chart. VH1 ranked the band seventh on its list of the "100 Greatest Hard Rock Artists".

== History ==
=== 1972–1977: Formation and early history ===
The Van Halen brothers were born in Amsterdam, the Netherlands, Alex Van Halen in 1953 and Eddie Van Halen in 1955, sons to Dutch musician Jan Van Halen and Indonesian-born Indo Eugenia Van Beers. The family moved to Pasadena, California, in 1962. Eddie began learning classical piano by ear, and became so proficient he won an annual piano recital contest two or three years in a row, despite never mastering sight-reading sheet music. The brothers began playing music together in the 1960s, with Eddie on drums and Alex on guitar. However, while Eddie was delivering newspapers to pay off his drum set, Alex secretly developed a passion and proficiency at them. Eventually, out of frustration and brotherly competition, Eddie told Alex, "OK, you play drums and I'll play your guitar."

The Van Halen brothers formed their first band, the Broken Combs, in 1964. As they gained popularity playing backyard parties and local high school functions, they changed their name first to the Trojan Rubber Co, then in 1972 to Genesis, later to Mammoth when they discovered Genesis was already in use by a major-label British band. At this time the band included Eddie on both vocals and lead guitar and friend Mark Stone on bass. They rented a sound-system from Indiana-born Pasadena transplant David Lee Roth for $10 per night. Roth fronted a local R&B influenced rock band the Red Ball Jets. Roth's uncle Manny owned Cafe Wha? in New York City until 1968. Partly to save money, they invited Roth to join as their lead vocalist despite previous unconvincing auditions. Ultimately Roth's charismatic "Jim Dandy" approach would be both an artistic foil to Eddie's circumspect, guitar prodigy talents as well as allowing Eddie to focus his energies on song composition.

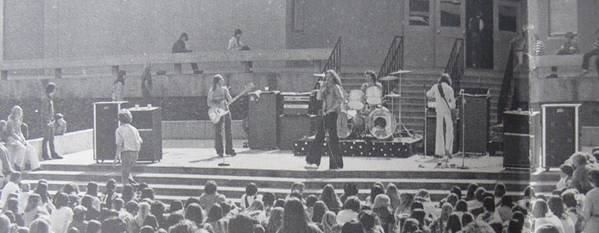
Van Halen performing at La Cañada High School in 1975

In 1973, Mammoth changed its name to Van Halen. According to Roth, this was his idea. He felt it was a name that held long-term identity, artistic and marketing advantages, like Santana. They continued to play Pasadena, San Bernardino, and Venice at clubs, festivals, backyard parties and city parks like Hamilton, drawing up to 2,000 people. Traffic jams and noise complaints to the local police often ensued, as far away as San Pedro. Van Halen subsequently played clubs in Los Angeles and West Hollywood to growing audiences, increasing their popularity through self-promotion, passing out flyers at local high schools. This tenacious self-promotion soon earned them a loyal local following.

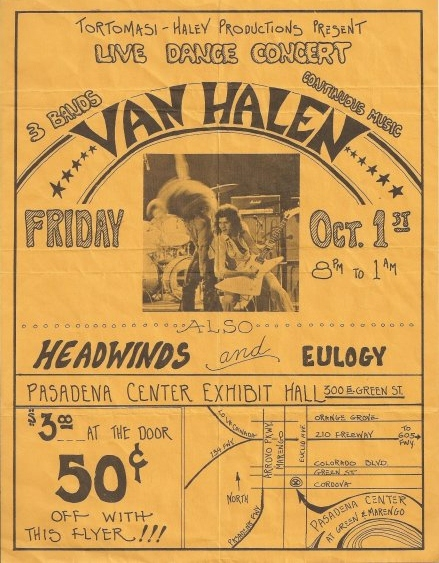
Flyer handed out at La Cañada High School show. Eddie playing an Ibanez Destroyer.

By 1974, Roth had been in the band for about a year, and they decided to replace the ambivalent Stone, who was unsure about a career in music. Michael Anthony Sobolewski, a Pasadena college music-classmate of Eddie's, joined the group after an all-night jam session. He had sung and played bass in a number of less successful Arcadia backyard-party bands, including Snake. Although he was hesitant, his bandmate in Snake encouraged him to seize this opportunity. The band had a major break when it was hired to play regularly at the Sunset Strip club Gazzarri's. The Doors had "broken" there in the late 1960s. Owner Bill Gazzarri had previously claimed Van Halen was too loud for the venue. However, their new managers, Mark Algorri and Mario Miranda, took over the club's hiring and booked them through 1976. By the Spring of 1975, they were the regular Tuesday night band at Myron's Ballroom. They had succeeded in becoming a staple of the Los Angeles music scene during the mid-1970s, playing at clubs like the Whisky a Go Go on Sunset Strip.

Rodney Bingenheimer saw Van Halen at Gazzarri's in the summer of 1976, and convinced Gene Simmons of Kiss to see them perform. Impressed, Simmons produced a 29-track Van Halen demo tape, entitled "Zero", at Village Recorder studios in Los Angeles, with post-production overdubs completed at Electric Lady Studios in New York. Simmons suggested changing their name to "Daddy Longlegs." However, a very disappointed Simmons could do no more once Kiss management decided that Van Halen "had no chance of making it".

=== 1977–1985: Breakthrough and initial success with David Lee Roth ===
Doug Messenger, Van Morrison's band leader guitarist, knowing that Ted Templeman was looking for a "guitar hero" act, had seen Van Halen at the Starwood in Hollywood and placed a number of calls to Warner Records for Ted to check them out. "I don't know if it was 4 calls or 10, but I knew this was exactly the act Ted wanted. So on a horrendously rainy night in mid-1977", Warner Bros. executive Mo Ostin and producer Ted Templeman saw Van Halen perform at the Starwood in Hollywood. It was Van Halen's first booking at the Starwood and the first time they hired their own roadies. "We wanted to come on with a little class and we couldn't be seen setting up our own stuff in Hollywood," explained Roth. Although the audience was negligible – Messenger claims only a barmaid and himself were there until Ostin and Templeman arrived – the Warner Bros. reps were so impressed that they wrote a letter of intent on a napkin, and within a week met at a local diner with the band, their future manager Marshall Berle (nephew of comedian Milton Berle) and Warner touring manager Noel Monk, who had just guided the Sex Pistols across the United States. According to Noel Monk's book, the band's car had broken down en route to the meeting at the diner, and rather than leave the Warner Bros. reps waiting and appear to be an irresponsible band, the members of Van Halen actually ran the remaining distance of several miles to arrive only slightly late. Warner offered the band a two album recording contract, one that heavily favored Warner, paying the band $0.70 per unit (album) sold, a deal that would leave the band over $1 million in debt at the conclusion of their first supporting tour as the opening act for Journey and Ronnie Montrose. The group recorded their debut album at Sunset Sound Recorders studio from mid-September to early October 1977, recording guitar parts for one week and then vocals for two additional. All of the tracks were laid down with little overdubbing or multi-tracking. Minor mistakes were purposely left on the record and a very rudimentary instrument set-up was used to give the record a live feel. During this time, they continued to play various venues in Southern California, including concerts at the Pasadena Convention Center produced by their promoter and impresario, Steve Tortomasi.

Van Halen reached No. 19 on the Billboard pop music charts, one of rock's most commercially successful debuts. It was regarded as both a heavy metal and hard rock album. The album included songs now regarded as Van Halen classics, like "Runnin' with the Devil" and the guitar solo "Eruption", which showcased Eddie's use of a technique known as "finger-tapping", leading into what became the band's first single, a cover of "You Really Got Me". The band toured for 9 months more, opening for Black Sabbath and establishing a reputation for their performances. The band's chemistry was based on Eddie Van Halen's guitar technique and David Lee Roth's charisma. The band returned to the studio for two weeks in late 1978, to record Van Halen II, a 1979 LP similar in style to their debut. This record yielded the band's first hit single, "Dance the Night Away", which peaked at 15 on BB Hot 100.

Over the next four years, the band toured non-stop, never taking more than two weeks to record an album. Their album Women and Children First was released in 1980, and further cemented Van Halen's platinum-selling status to Warner Bros. It yielded two hit singles, "And the Cradle Will Rock..." and "Everybody Wants Some!!". For the first time, an amplified Wurlitzer electric piano was used to complement Eddie's guitar.

In 1981, during the recording of Fair Warning, Eddie's desire for darker, more complex songs in minor keys was at odds with Roth's pop tastes and style. Nonetheless, Roth and veteran Warner Bros. rock producer Ted Templeman acquiesced to Eddie's wishes on this album. Doug Messenger recalled how Ed and engineer Don Landee rerecorded the "Unchained" solo hours after Ted "stormed out of" the studio. This darker album only reached platinum status after $250,000 of payola pushed it up nationwide from 400,000 copies.

Planning to release a cover single, then take a hiatus, Roth and Eddie agreed upon a remake of the 1960s Roy Orbison song "Oh, Pretty Woman", which peaked at 12 on BB Top 100. "Oh, Pretty Woman"'s comical video helped its success, but was also banned by MTV. Due to much pressure from Warner Bros., the hiatus was canceled and the Diver Down LP was squeezed out, again, within two weeks time. Roth's preference for pop covers prevailed this time and with Eddie's synthesizer and guitar riffs Diver Down charted much better. The band earned a spot in the Guinness Book of World Records for the highest-paid single appearance of a band: $1.5 million for a 90-minute set at Steve Wozniak's 1983 US Festival, a show that both Noel Monk and Doug Messenger considered artistically a disaster, Roth having consumed alcohol to the point of forgetting lyrics. Despite this return to form, Roth and Eddie's differences continued, and this caused friction with other band members. Billy Sheehan, after his band Talas completed a tour with Van Halen, claims he was approached by Eddie to replace Michael Anthony; the reasons for this were never completely clear to Sheehan, as nothing came of it. During this time, Eddie contributed the score and instrumental songs to the film The Wild Life. The score was laden with drum machine and hinted at sounds and riffs that would come with their next two albums, 1984 and 5150.

1984 (released on January 9, 1984) was a commercial success, going five-times platinum after a year of release. Recorded at Eddie's newly built 5150 Studios, the album featured keyboards, which had only been used sporadically on previous albums. The lead single, "Jump", featured a synthesizer hook and anthemic lyrics inspired by news coverage of a suicidal jumper. It became the band's first and only No. 1 pop hit with Roth, garnering them a Grammy nomination.

"Jump"
Sample of "Jump", the lead single from the band's sixth album, 1984. Centered around a synthesizer hook instead of the band's trademark guitar sound, and featuring anthemic lyrics, the song became the band's most commercially successful single.

Other singles included "Panama" (No. 13 U.S.), "I'll Wait" (also No. 13 U.S.), and "Hot for Teacher". Three of the songs had popular music videos on MTV. 1984 was praised by critics and peaked at No. 2 on the Billboard charts behind Michael Jackson's Thriller (which notably had a guitar solo by Eddie on "Beat It").

Following the 1984 Tour, Roth decided to quit and form a new band. Group members have given different reasons for the split, but all were firmly rooted in control of the band's sound, artistic direction, singles released and pace. Roth was concerned about Eddie playing music outside of Van Halen. Roth was also launching a successful solo career with two hit cover songs off his Crazy from the Heat EP, a remake of the Beach Boys' classic "California Girls" (No. 3 U.S.) and a pairing of the classic Al Jolson standard "Just a Gigolo" and "I Ain't Got Nobody" (No. 12 U.S.), which had previously been paired together by Louis Prima. Roth was also offered a $20-million film deal for a script titled Crazy from the Heat. On a chance meeting, Roth secured a verbal commitment from Rodney Dangerfield to appear in the film. Roth hoped Van Halen would contribute the soundtrack; however, the film deal fell through when CBS Pictures was reorganized in 1986.

=== 1985–1996: Sammy Hagar era ===
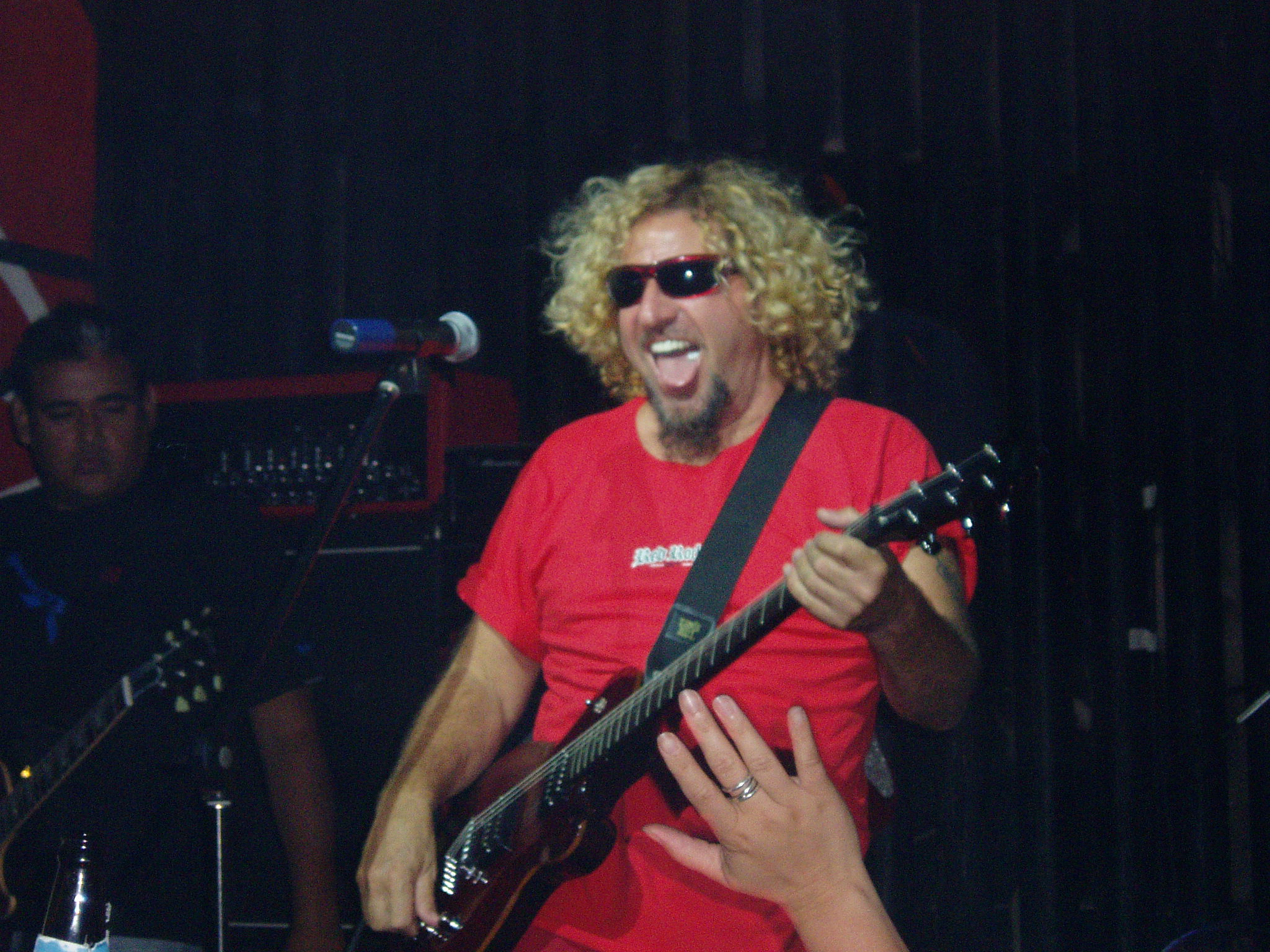
The introduction of Sammy Hagar (pictured in 2005) as vocalist continued the band's worldwide popularity.

Eddie invited Patty Smyth of Scandal to replace Roth, but she declined. Daryl Hall was offered the lead vocal position in 1985, but also declined. Hall verified to Hagar, his musical guest in the May 2015 season premiere of Live from Daryl's House, that he was approached after a Hall & Oates concert.

Eddie was introduced to Sammy Hagar in 1985, via their mutual car mechanic. Hagar was the former frontman for the hard rock group Montrose, and a solo artist coming off a very successful year. His hit single "I Can't Drive 55" came from his 1984 album VOA, produced by Ted Templeman, who had produced Montrose's first album Montrose, as well as all of Van Halen's albums up to that point. Hagar agreed to sing as well as play rhythm guitar.

When Warner Bros. president Mo Ostin came to the band's 5150 Studios to hear the band's progress, Hagar said the band played "Why Can't This Be Love" live with Eddie on keyboards, after which Ostin proclaimed: "I smell money."

The 1986 Van Halen album 5150 was a huge hit, becoming the band's first No. 1 album on the Billboard charts, driven by the keyboard-dominated singles "Why Can't This Be Love" (No. 3 U.S.), "Dreams", and "Love Walks In" (Top 30 U.S.). To further introduce the new era for the band, a new Van Halen logo was put on the cover. It retained elements of the original, but with lines extending from either side of 'VH' wrapped around and formed a ring.

Following the release of the 5150 album, the 5150 Tour was launched to support it across North America. Footage was released on VHS and LaserDisc as Live Without a Net. The band minimized the use of pre-Hagar Van Halen songs in the set.

All four studio albums produced during this period reached No. 1 on the Billboard pop music charts and 17 singles breached the top 12 of the mainstream rock tracks chart. During that era, a single taken from 1988's OU812, "When It's Love", reached the Top Five, peaking at No. 5. In addition, Van Halen was nominated for two Grammy Awards. The band won the 1992 Grammy Award for Best Hard Rock Performance with Vocal for the album For Unlawful Carnal Knowledge. Van Halen continued to enjoy success throughout the mid-1990s. They recorded a live album and concert film at two 1992 F.U.C.K. tour shows in Fresno, California called Live: Right Here, Right Now. During the F.U.C.K. and the live album supporting Live: Right Here Right Now tour, Night Ranger's Alan Fitzgerald played keyboards offstage every night allowing Eddie to concentrate on guitar. Fitzgerald returned to play-offstage keyboards on the 2004, 2007, and 2012 tours.

In 1995, Van Halen released the album Balance and supported Bon Jovi on their European Summer stadium tour. The Balance Tour was nicknamed the "Ambulance Tour" by the band due to an amount of physical ailments, as Hagar had throat problems during the first concerts, Eddie suffered a hip injury caused by avascular necrosis, and Alex wore a neck brace due to ruptured vertebrae.

During the recording of songs for the film Twister, escalating tension between Hagar and the Van Halen brothers boiled over and Hagar departed June 1996. Hagar claimed he was fired, and Eddie claimed Hagar quit. The band had recorded "Humans Being", a song for which Eddie, unhappy with Hagar's lyrics, retitled the song and wrote the melody. This upset Hagar, and when they were to record a second song for the soundtrack, Hagar was in Hawaii for the birth of his child. With Hagar back in Hawaii and against the idea of doing the project, but having another song left to contribute, the Van Halen brothers alone recorded the instrumental "Respect the Wind". The performance, which featured Eddie playing guitar and Alex playing keyboards, was nominated for Best Rock Instrumental Performance at the 39th Annual Grammy Awards.

The band was working on a compilation album. This led to conflicts with Hagar and the group's new manager, Ray Danniels (Ed Leffler's replacement and Alex Van Halen's former brother-in-law), even though it was Leffler who had renewed their contract with Warner Bros. Records and had added of a greatest hits album option years before. Hagar was reluctant to work on a compilation album before a new album came out, but if the rest of the band and Danniels insisted on going forward with one at that time, his preference was that it should include only Roth-era songs, or as a third choice, that two volumes should be released, one of Roth-era songs and one of Hagar-era songs. During this same period, competing personal priorities and creative differences contributed to increasing interpersonal tensions within the band, particularly between Eddie and Hagar. The relationship between Hagar and Van Halen broke down.

=== 1996: Temporary reunion with Roth ===
Roth called Eddie to discuss what tracks would be included on a planned Van Halen compilation (work on which had actually begun before Hagar's departure). They got along well, and Eddie invited him up to his house/studio. Shortly afterwards, Roth re-entered the studio with the band and producer Glen Ballard. Two songs from those sessions were added to the band's Best Of – Volume I album and released as singles to promote it.

In September, Van Halen was asked to present an award at the 1996 MTV Video Music Awards. They agreed, and on September 4, 1996, the four original members of Van Halen made their first public appearance together in over eleven years. This helped to bring the compilation to No. 1 on the U.S. album charts. However, unknown to Roth, Eddie and Alex were still auditioning other singers, including Mitch Malloy.

The band's appearance on the 1996 MTV Video Music Awards fueled reunion speculation. But several weeks after the awards show, it was discovered that Roth was out of Van Halen again. Roth released a statement that Van Halen misled him into thinking they were seriously considering bringing him back into the band and that he had made clear to them beforehand that he did not want to do the awards show unless they were actually reuniting. The next day, the Van Halen brothers and Anthony released their own statement, denying they had in any way led Roth to believe they were planning to bring him back into the band.

Eddie later recounted that at the MTV Video Music Awards appearance, he was embarrassed and outraged by Roth's antics while on camera behind Beck, who was giving an acceptance speech for the award that Van Halen had presented to him. At a backstage press conference, press queries about a reunion tour were met with Eddie saying that he needed a hip replacement and would have to record an entire new studio album before any tour. Roth told Eddie to avoid talking about negative things like his hip and the two almost came to blows.

=== 1996–2000: Gary Cherone era ===
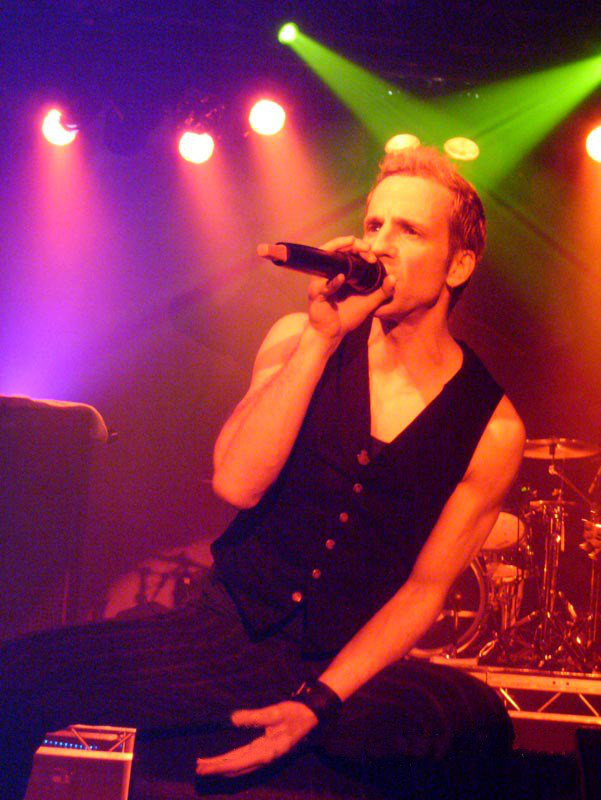
Vocalist Gary Cherone (pictured in 2008) joined the band briefly in the late 1990s.

Van Halen's next lead singer was Gary Cherone, former frontman of the Boston-based band Extreme, a group which had enjoyed some popular success in the early 1990s. The result was the album Van Halen III. Many songs were longer and more experimental than Van Halen's earlier work. It was a notable contrast from their previous material, with more focus on ballads than traditional rock songs ("How Many Say I", with Eddie on vocals). Sales were poor by the band's standards, only reaching a Gold certification, despite the album peaking at No. 4 on the U.S. charts. However, Van Halen III did produce the hit "Without You", and another album track, "Fire in the Hole", appeared on the Lethal Weapon 4 soundtrack. The album was followed by a tour. The III Tour saw Van Halen playing in countries they did not visit before, including first visits to Australia and New Zealand. "Without You" acquired No. 1 place on the Billboard Mainstream Rock Charts in 1998, the 13th song of theirs to do so. This made them the band with the most Mainstream Rock No. 1s.

Van Halen returned to the studio and in early 1999 started work on a new album. For the sessions, they brought on Danny Kortchmar to produce. Working titles of songs included "Left for Dead", "River Wide", "Say Uncle", "You Wear it Well", "More Than Yesterday", "I Don't Miss You ... Much", "Love Divine", and "From Here, Where Do We Go?"; more than 20 songs were rumored to have been written. The project was never released, with Cherone leaving the band amicably in November 1999, citing musical differences and personal issues that he was going through. None of the material from these sessions has been released, and the band released no new material until three new songs written and recorded with Hagar were included on the 2004 Best of Both Worlds compilation.

Cherone stated that he believed if he and the band had toured first and then recorded an album they might have creatively gelled more and the album would have turned out better.

Touring with Cherone had proven disappointing in terms of attendance. Eddie later admitted that Warner Bros. had forced his hand in parting with Cherone. Unlike with the previous two singers, there was reportedly no bad blood behind the breakup, and Cherone remained in contact and on good terms with Van Halen. As when Hagar left, speculation resumed on a Roth reunion.

=== 1999–2003: Hiatus from public ===
Eddie recovered from his hip surgery in November 1999, but from 2000 to early 2004 no statements were made by Van Halen and no music was released. However, information about members past and present trickled in. The Van Halen brothers continued writing at 5150 Studios, Cherone recorded an album and toured with new band Tribe of Judah. One of the songs that Cherone had written for the scrapped second album with Van Halen, titled "Left For Dead", had its lyrics set to a new musical arrangement with Tribe of Judah.

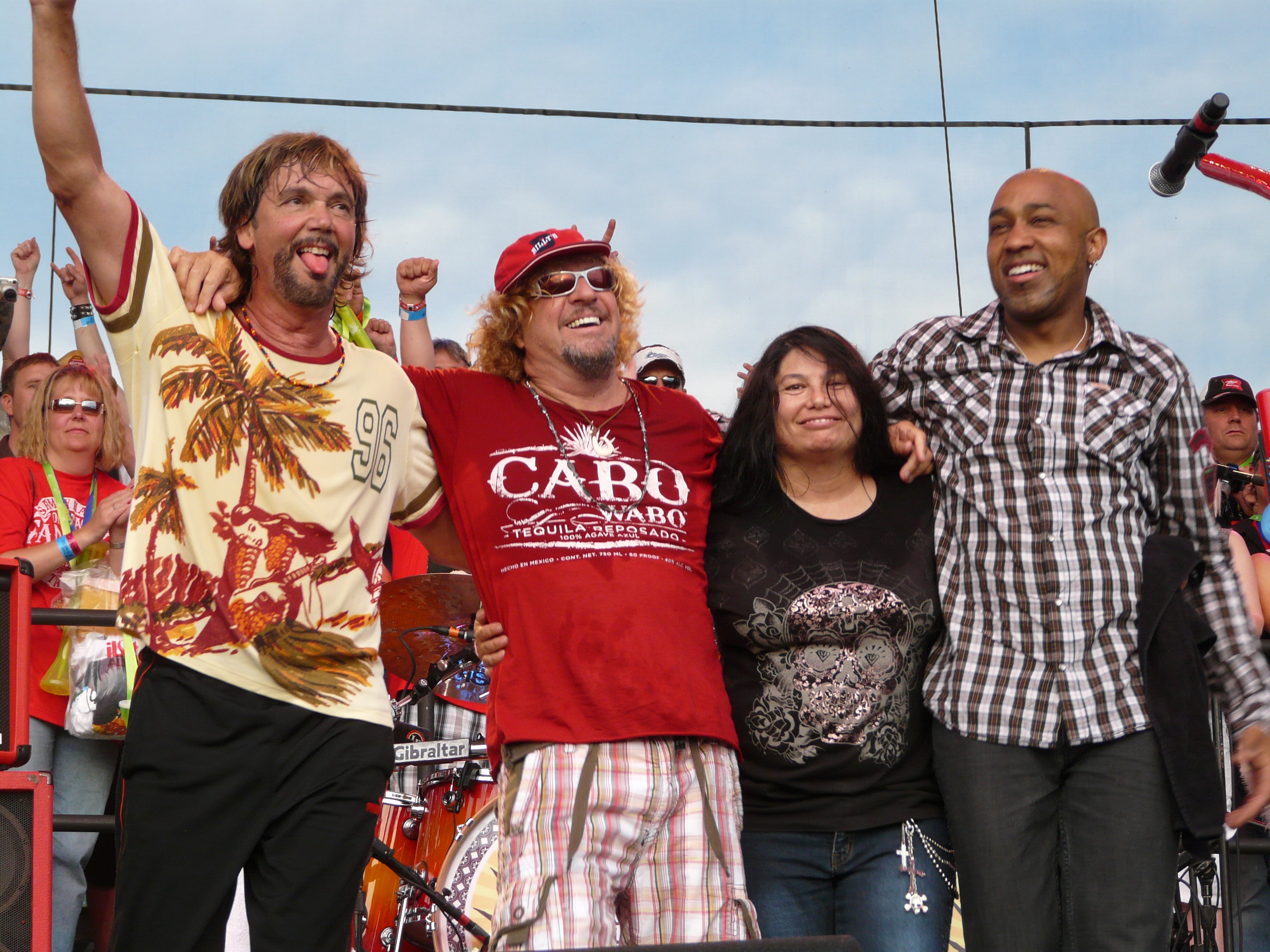
After leaving Van Halen, Hagar has focused on his band the Waboritas as well as branching out into the Cabo Wabo nightclub, merchandise, and alcohol brands.

Responding to speculation that he had been approached to replace Cherone, David Coverdale said, "I called a mutual friend and said, 'Tell Eddie I had nothing to do with this.' It just got ridiculous. I've heard that they were going to approach me, but since I left Purple I've always done my own thing. Why would I join anybody else?"

In 2000, the band reunited briefly with David Lee Roth attempting to do a new album, only for disputes with Roth to abort these plans. The recorded demos were among the ones reworked into new songs on 2012's A Different Kind of Truth. The band also tried to just schedule some concerts with Roth at a later date. In 2001, the band had entered early discussions with Ozzy Osbourne to serve as the next lead vocalist of the band. Negotiations ended, due to the production schedule of The Osbournes however.

In the summer of 2002, Roth and Hagar teamed up in the Song for Song, the Heavyweight Champs of Rock and Roll tour (also known as the 'Sans-Halen' or 'Sam & Dave' Tour). The tour, with both singers headlining, attracted media and audience fascination because it seemed more improbable than ever a Van Halen tour with Roth or Hagar. It drew large crowds and featured no opening acts, Roth and Hagar alternating as the first act. Roth contrasted his personality with Hagar's: "He's the kind of guy you go out with to split a bottle with a friend. I'm the kind of guy you go out with if you want to split your friend with a bottle." Anthony guested with Hagar's band, the Waboritas, numerous times and sometimes sang lead vocals. During performances, Hagar would tease Anthony by asking, "Do the brothers know you're here?" Anthony never played with Roth. Cherone appeared on occasion. Hagar released a live album (Hallelujah), featuring vocals by Anthony and Cherone, and a documentary DVD, Long Road to Cabo, about touring with Roth. While the two singers promoted the tour and publicly claimed mutual respect, rumors of bitter acrimony and mutual loathing swirled. The allegations were later supported by backstage video, which showed the Roth and Hagar camps maintaining strict separation.

Next, Hagar joined with Joe Satriani and Journey guitarist Neal Schon to form a side project, Planet Us, with Michael Anthony and Deen Castronovo (also of Journey) on drums. The band recorded just two songs and played live a few times before dissolving when Hagar and Anthony rejoined Van Halen.

On July 4, 2004, Roth performed with the Boston Pops, at United States' annual Pops Goes the Fourth celebration in Boston. Hagar remained active, releasing five albums and creating his own merchandising brand Cabo Wabo, which lends its name to the line of tequila he formerly owned, as well as his franchise of cantinas. He reunited with Montrose in 2003 and 2005 for a few performances and maintained contact with Anthony, often playing with him. With Van Halen inactive, Anthony set up a website and worked on merchandising projects such as his signature Yamaha bass and range of hot sauces. He became involved with the annual music industry NAMM Show.

=== 2003–2005: Reunion with Hagar ===
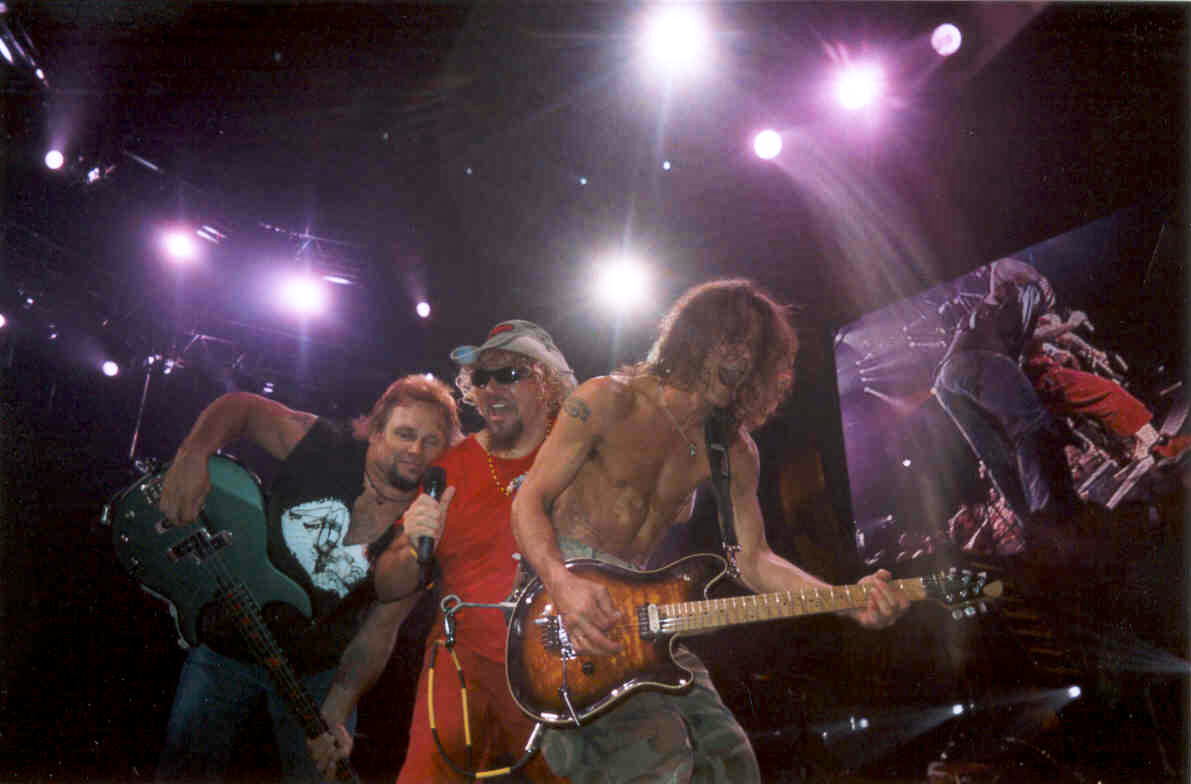
Van Halen during their 2004 reunion period. Left to right: Michael Anthony, Sammy Hagar, Eddie Van Halen.

Anthony had repeatedly contacted Hagar regarding a reunion, detailing how the attempts to do the same with Roth never worked out. Eventually, Hagar decided to call Alex to spend a day together with him. The two got along and became interested in reuniting on stage. Van Halen and Hagar reunited for a new compilation release and a summer concert tour of the U.S.

In July 2004, Van Halen released The Best of Both Worlds, a double CD compilation featuring three new songs with Hagar: "It's About Time", "Up for Breakfast", and "Learning to See". These new songs were credited to Hagar/Van Halen/Van Halen, which was unusual since normally the entire lineup, which also included Michael Anthony, would be credited. However, the performance was credited to the entire band. Anthony revealed in interviews that Eddie had in fact not wanted him to be a part of the reunion, with him only joining at Hagar's insistence. The new songs had already been recorded, with Eddie playing the bass parts himself instead, and Anthony only provided backing vocals for the three tracks. No songs with Cherone from Van Halen III were included. It was certified platinum in the US in August 2004.

The Summer 2004 tour grossed almost US$55 million, and Pollstar listed Van Halen in the top 10 grossing tours of 2004. Critical reviews of the tour were mixed. On some shows, Eddie's son Wolfgang came onstage and played guitar with his father during "316", a song dedicated to his son, taking its name from his March 16 date of birth. During the later stages of the tour, stories of Eddie being drunk began to surface along with fan-shot video footage of poor playing. At the band's final show of the tour, in Tucson, Eddie smashed one of his guitars at the end of the show.

After the tour, things broke down. At first Hagar stated he had yet to decide what he would be doing with Van Halen, although he was still an official member of the band. Soon after, however, both Hagar and Anthony admitted that Eddie had problems with alcohol during the tour that affected everyone involved. Hagar stated that he was "done with Van Halen" and wished that everyone would have "taken it more seriously." Despite this, Eddie later described himself as "satisfied" with the tour.

After the tour ended, Hagar returned to his solo band the Waboritas, and Anthony appeared with him on tour occasionally. The band quickly faded from view after Hagar left again.

=== 2006–2008: Second reunion with Roth and Wolfgang Van Halen era ===
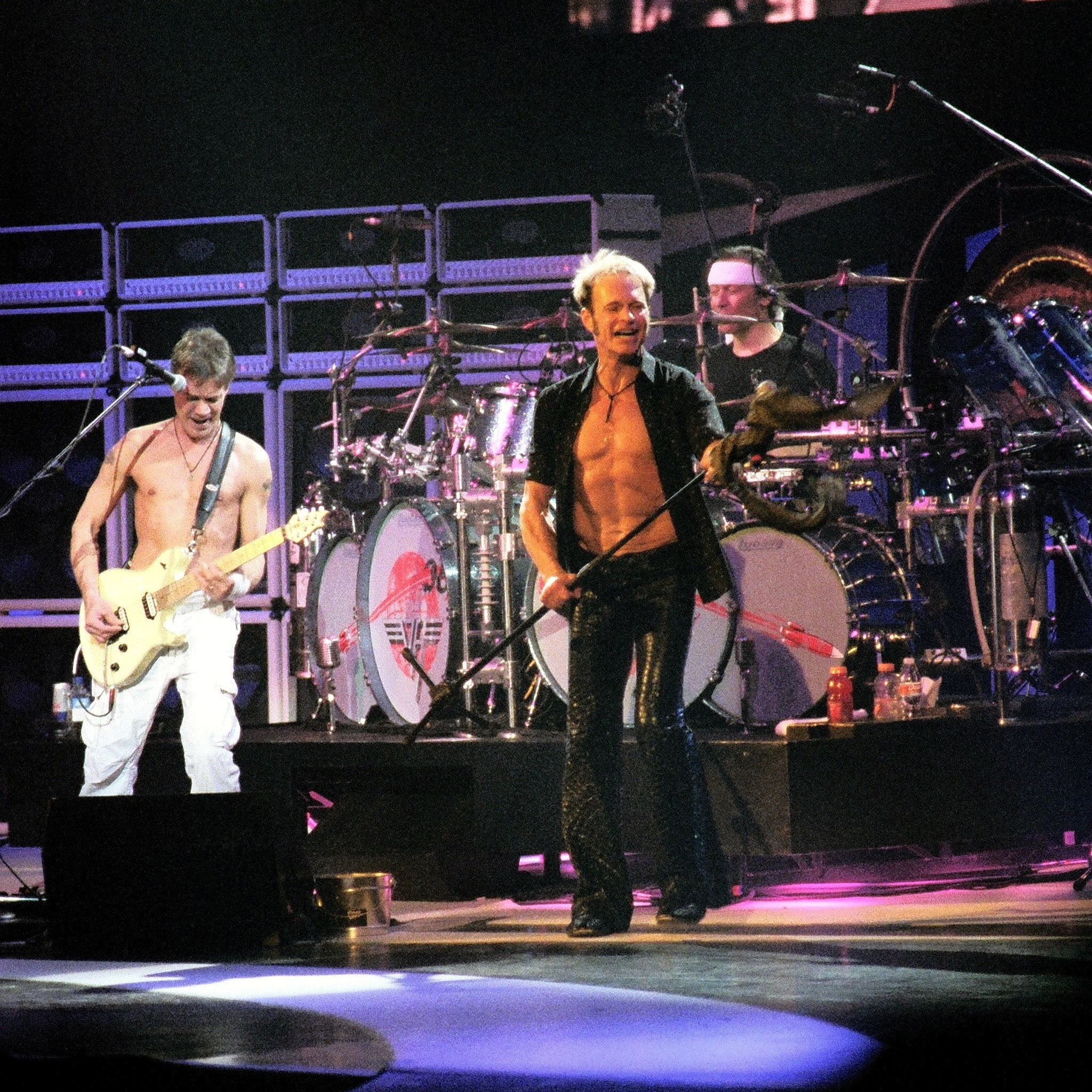
Roth and the Van Halen brothers performing in San Antonio, Texas in 2008

Rumors of a Roth reunion re-emerged and on January 3, 2006, Roth explained during an interview that he had spoken to Alex Van Halen the previous week and a reunion was "inevitable." However, he also said that Eddie Van Halen was "off in his own little world". When asked if any problems occurred with Hagar during the 2004 tour Eddie answered, "Sammy is Sammy, and for the most part that's just fine." Roth persisted with suggestions of a reunion, saying, "People want the reunion," and "No one will pay respect to what any of us do [musically] until we get the reunion out of the way." In May 2006, he told Billboard.com, "There's contact between the two camps."

On June 3, Anthony began a successful tour with Hagar billed as the Other Half (a reference to them being half of Van Halen with the other half being Eddie/Alex), with Anthony singing lead vocals sometimes. Meanwhile, on June 19 the Van Halen brothers jumped onstage with Kenny Chesney at The Home Depot Center performing "Jump" and "You Really Got Me". This unusual performance was their first onstage since the 2004 tour. This was followed by another Eddie performance on July 19, 2006, at the House of Petals in Los Angeles, playing new material. He followed this with an announcement on July 27, 2006, that some of his new music would be released on the soundtrack for the pornographic film Sacred Sin.

In March 2006, Anthony spoke to Japanese rock magazine Burrn!, claiming the brothers did not want him on the 2004 reunion tour, although Hagar did (and would not play without Anthony), but he had to agree to reduced royalties and end absolutely all association with the band after the tour in terms of rights to using the name to promote himself. In this same interview he admitted he was not involved in the new songs on Best of Both Worlds and only recorded three tracks for Van Halen III.

Anthony was replaced as bass player by Eddie's son, Wolfgang Van Halen, in 2006. On September 8, 2006, Howard Stern's live interview with Eddie broke the band's long silence. Eddie said he was willing to reunite with Roth and revealed a solo album in the works. Eddie confirmed that Wolfgang had replaced Anthony on bass; Wolfgang had played guitar alongside his father during Eddie's guitar solo on some 2004 concert dates. When queried about the Other Half tour, Eddie said Anthony could "do what he wants" now. This shocked and offended many fans. In November, Eddie's spokesperson, Janie Liszewski, claimed the Van Halen family was writing/rehearsing for a summer 2007 tour, which Billboard magazine's website shortly confirmed. However, the Van Halen website remained in the state it had been in since the Hagar reunion.

On December 11, 2006, Eddie stated to Guitar World magazine that Roth had been directly invited to rejoin the band. However, on December 28, Roth announced that he had not talked to Eddie in two years, and a reunion with Van Halen could result in a "Jerry Springer-style fight."

In January 2007, Van Halen was inducted into the Rock and Roll Hall of Fame. The Van Halen brothers, Anthony, Hagar, and Roth were inducted, though only Hagar and Anthony appeared at the induction ceremony on behalf of the group. Eddie Van Halen was in rehab at the time, so neither he nor Alex attended the ceremony. Velvet Revolver had been slated to perform "You Really Got Me" with Roth on lead vocals. However, Roth wanted to perform "Jump" and the band hadn't rehearsed that song, so Roth elected to not attend the ceremony at all, and Velvet Revolver performed "Ain't Talkin' 'Bout Love". Anthony and Hagar performed "Why Can't This Be Love" with Paul Shaffer. Billboard announced on January 24, 2007, that Van Halen would reunite with Roth for a U.S. tour. This was confirmed shortly after on the official Van Halen website.

The Van Halen News Desk announced on February 15, 2007, that a Van Halen Best Of (1978–1984), a single-disc compilation of the Roth era, would be released by April 3. Shortly after, information arrived in a flood. Various sources claimed the tour was shut down as was the new Best Of CD. On March 8, 2007, Eddie announced on Van Halen's website that he was in rehab. Along with the announcement, a change was made to the website. The logo at the top of the page changed to the original Van Halen logo from their 1978 debut album.

On April 21, 2007, Eddie served as an Honorary Race Official for the NASCAR race at Phoenix International Raceway. On May 24, he posted a note to the Van Halen website confirming that he had completed rehab successfully.

After nearly 10 months of speculation and rumors, Van Halen (and Roth separately via his own website) said that the band would be going on a tour of North America. Roth claimed in the press release that, "the idea is that this will continue on and on and on" and also that a world tour and a new album were both in the works.

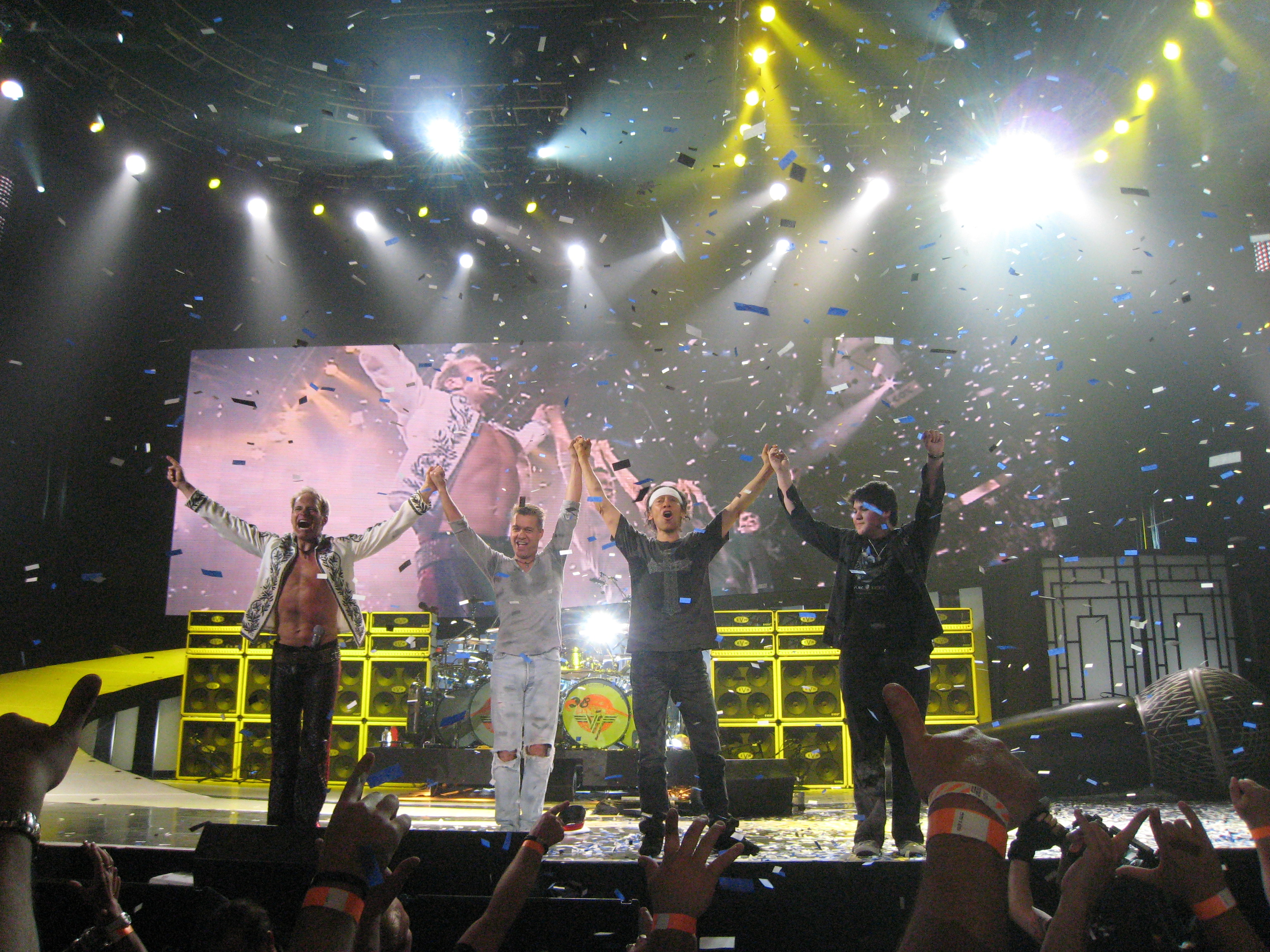
Van Halen onstage with Roth and Wolfgang in 2008

Press reaction to the reunion was largely warm, but the re-designed website sparked controversy when Anthony was removed from images of old album artwork. The album covers were restored to their original condition a day later without a word. Wolfgang claimed in 2020 that the omission of Anthony on the website was a choice made by the band's marketing team and was done without consent of the band. Once the band discovered the condition of the website, they ordered it be reverted to its original state. The Fall 2007 tour was originally 25 dates, but was extended into 2008 with a second leg.

Van Halen started their new tour on September 27, 2007, in Charlotte, North Carolina. Playing to sellout crowds, the tour generated positive reviews. Amid rumors of Eddie being back in rehab, multiple dates of the tour were postponed. The official reason was the need for medical procedures to be run on Eddie.

On March 5, 2008, World Entertainment Weekly to CBS News reported that the reason the tour had been interrupted was Eddie's needing to reenter rehab. The report also indicated that it had been a "furious backstage bust-up in Florida with his 17-year-old son and bandmate Wolfgang" which had motivated Eddie to seek help once again.

In response to rumors about Eddie being back in rehab Valerie Bertinelli said that "he is not in rehab." She did not, however, say if he had recently been in rehab, stating only that he was not currently, a statement echoed by Wolfgang during the 2008 Kids Choice Awards. The tour started back up on April 17 at the Reno Events Center in Nevada.

The tour ended on June 2, 2008, at the Van Andel Arena in Grand Rapids, Michigan. During the show Roth stated multiple times that this would not be their final show and that they would "see everyone next time." At this show the arena sign was altered to read "VAN HALEN ARENA". According to the Van Halen News Desk, the reunion tour with Roth was the highest grossing in the band's history, raking in almost $93 million.

On July 3, 2008, Van Halen headlined the Quebec City Summer Festival in front of a crowd of 85,000.

=== 2008–2020: A Different Kind of Truth and final tours ===
In an interview with Guitar World, posted on November 12, 2008, about the making of his upcoming new EVH Wolfgang guitar from Fender, Eddie said, in regard to new Van Halen music, "I'll be making music 'til the day I die. I've done all kinds of stuff, and more is coming. I can't tell you exactly when right now. Wolfgang is in the 12th grade and he needs to graduate first. Then I'm getting married in June. We'll pick it up after that." Eddie underwent surgery on his left hand in 2009, following some treatment for arthritis as he felt pain in his fingers during the 2007 tour. In an interview with Glide Magazine appearing in the May 2010 issue, Dweezil Zappa commented that Eddie had played him "new stuff from his record." It was not clear from the interview if the music was intended for a new Van Halen record.

In August 2010, Warner/Chappell Music extended its administration agreements with Van Halen (specifically Eddie and Alex Van Halen). Under the agreement, Warner/Chappell will continue to administer their catalog of works. This press release also stated that the group was in the studio recording an album with Roth, that was due for release in 2011.

Van Halen entered the Henson Studio C with producer John Shanks on January 17, 2011. Shanks posted on his Twitter account that he was in the studio with the band and posted a picture of one of Eddie's signature amps.

On June 16, 2011, Creed, Alter Bridge and Tremonti guitarist Mark Tremonti claimed that he had been invited to 5150 studios and that Eddie, Alex and Wolfgang Van Halen performed the album live, in its entirety, for Tremonti and Creed touring guitarist, Eric Friedman. Producer/engineer Ross Hogarth claimed on July 31, 2011, that "[t]he whole Van Halen record has been recorded." On September 5, 2011, it was reported that the mixing on the new album had been completed in mid-August, and production had progressed to the mastering stage.

Their official website was updated on December 26, 2011, announcing that tickets for their 2012 tour would be available starting January 10, 2012. On January 5, 2012, Van Halen played an intimate club gig at New York City's Cafe Wha? which received widespread praise from media and fans. On January 10, the upcoming album's first single, titled "Tattoo", made its premiere on radio stations. The following week, the single debuted at No. 67 on the Billboard Hot 100 Chart. The band's new studio album from Interscope Records, titled A Different Kind of Truth, was released on February 7, 2012. It was Van Halen's first studio release since 1998's Van Halen III and the first new music from the band since the three new songs from the 2004's Best of Both Worlds compilation. It would also be the first Van Halen album to feature Eddie's son, Wolfgang, on the bass in place of Anthony. This would also be the first full-length album to feature Roth on vocals in over 27 years, and the first new material with him in 15 years, since the two new songs with him on the Best Of – Volume I.

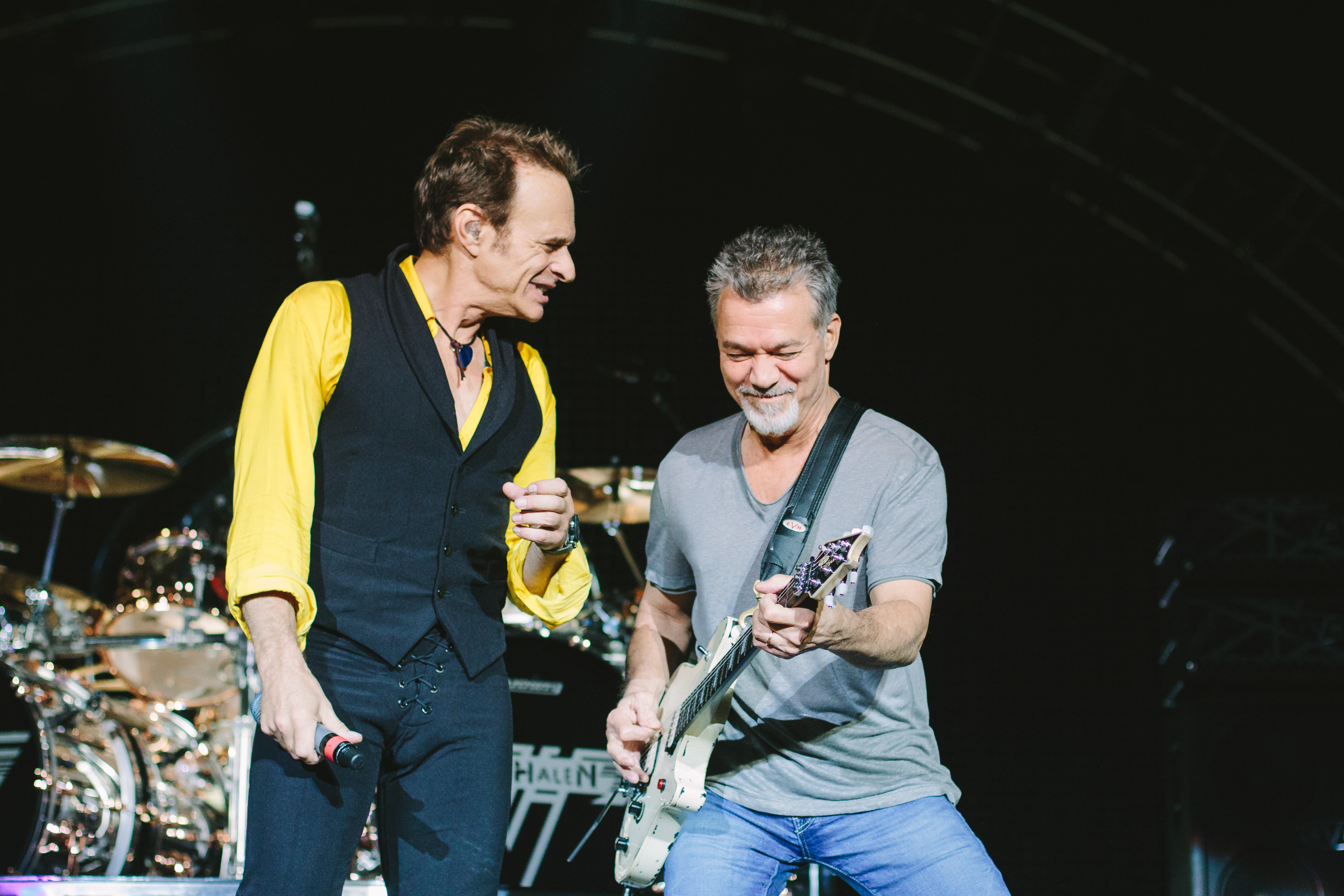
Roth and Eddie Van Halen performing live in 2015

On February 8, 2012, Van Halen performed a "friends and family" dress rehearsal at the Forum in Inglewood, California. The show featured many classics as well as several new songs from A Different Kind of Truth. Despite Van Halen's long lay-off between studio albums, A Different Kind of Truth sold 188,000 copies during its first six days of release, debuting at No. 2 on the Billboard 200 Albums Chart. There was an overwhelmingly positive critical and fan response to A Different Kind of Truth, which helped to fuel the album's long run in the upper reaches of the U.S. Billboard 200 Album Chart; additionally, it earned the band its highest-ever charting album in the United Kingdom (debuting at No. 6).

Despite an average ticket price of approximately $150, Van Halen's "A Different Kind of Truth Tour" proved to be a commercial success as well, with nearly all U.S. arena shows "either sold-out, or close to it." Critically, the band received mostly positive reviews, particularly when performing throughout the U.S. Northeast and West Coast. R&B band Kool and the Gang were hand-picked by frontman Roth to open the first two legs of Van Halen's tour.

On May 17, 2012, Rolling Stone reported that Van Halen was postponing all tour dates after their show of June 26 in New Orleans, Louisiana. Shortly thereafter, the Van Halen News Desk revealed that the band's members were in good health, had not been arguing with each other, and that the reason for the postponed tour dates was to take a break after 18 months of non-stop recording and touring as well as to allow the group the opportunity to enhance its concert presentation before resuming the tour in the late summer of 2012. However, the postponed dates were officially listed as canceled shortly thereafter.

On August 30, 2012, Eddie was diagnosed with diverticulitis and underwent surgery postponing the shows in Japan initially scheduled for November 2012. On April 20, 2013, the Roth-fronted Van Halen played its first show outside North America since 1984, and their first in Australia since 1998, at the Stone Festival in Sydney. This was followed by one show each in Tokyo and Nagoya, and two in Osaka, from June 18 to 26.

On March 31, 2015, their first live album with Roth, Tokyo Dome Live in Concert, was released. The album featured performances from their June 23, 2013, performance at the Tokyo Dome. It was also reported that the band would be releasing newly remastered versions of their 1978 debut and 1984 on CD, digital, and vinyl. In an interview the same month, when asked about the status of Van Halen, Eddie responded by saying "I'd love to make a studio record. Depends on everybody's timing. I don't know what Dave Lee Roth is up to now. I don't know if he's living in New York or Japan or wherever he is."

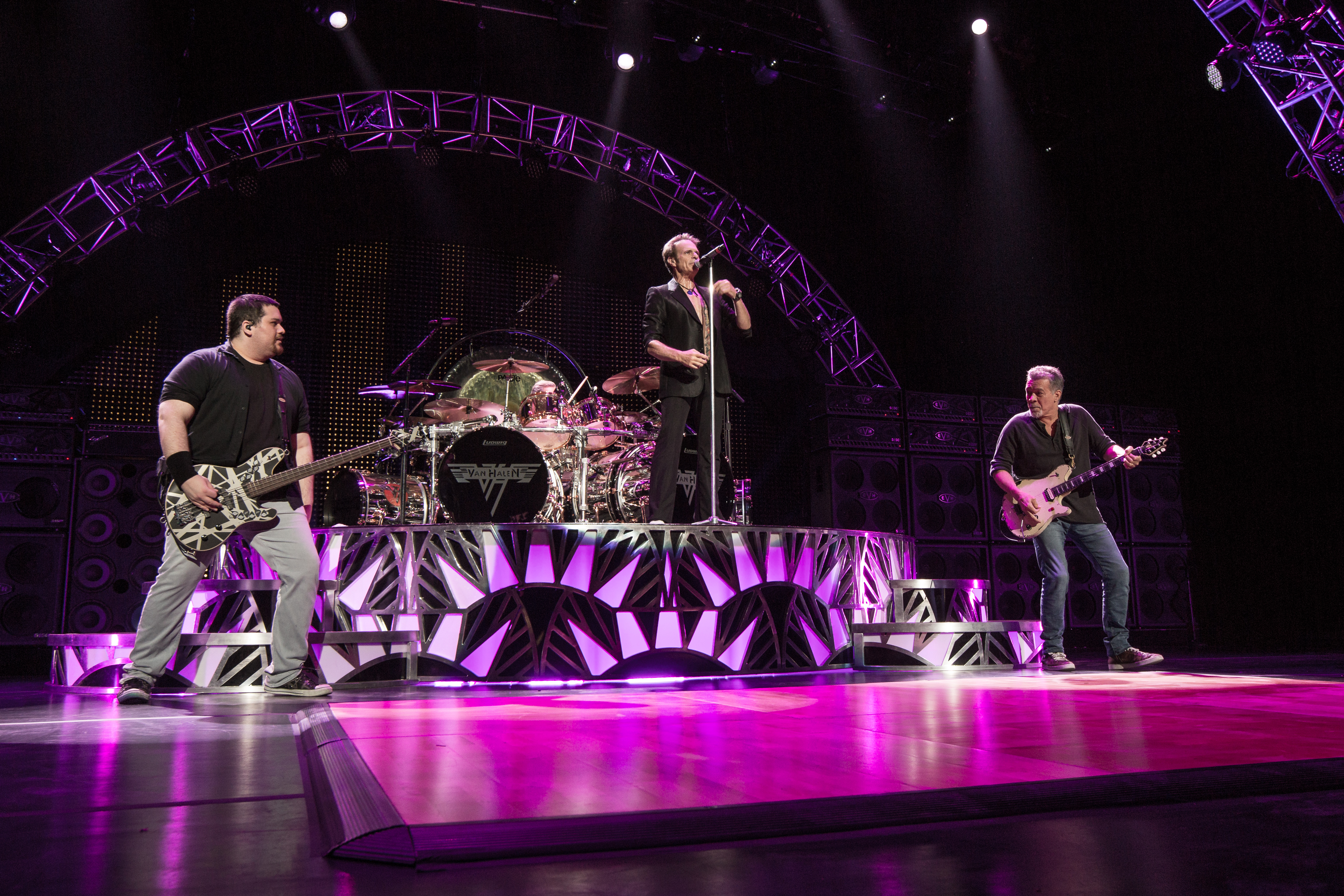
Van Halen performing at the Xfinity Center on August 1, 2015.

On March 24, 2015, Van Halen announced a 39 date tour with Roth to take place from July to October 2015 across North America. In April 2015, Eddie told Rolling Stone that the band would "probably hunker down and do a studio record" after their tour. The band worked with Chris Cornell to write songs, and to potentially lead the band; this ended when the singer died however.

On September 12, 2019, Van Halen announced that they would be releasing a box set of the Japanese singles, which was released on November 1, 2019. On September 30, 2019, while promoting an upcoming 2020 solo concert, Roth expressed uncertainty towards the band's future, stating "I think Van Halen is finished." However, Hagar indicated in a May 2020 interview that he believed otherwise claiming "Until Ed or Alex Van Halen die, they're not finished." He expressed a hope that the band could reunite with himself and Anthony saying "My dream tour is the Sam and Dave tour with Ed, Al and Mike."

=== 2020–present: Eddie's death, disbandment and potential future albums ===
On October 6, 2020, Wolfgang announced on his Twitter account that Eddie had died from cancer. His death came ten days after original Van Halen bassist Mark Stone died of cancer. In a November 2020 interview with Howard Stern, Wolfgang Van Halen confirmed the band's end, stating "You can't have Van Halen without Eddie Van Halen." He had also confirmed that the band had considered a "kitchen-sink" reunion tour with Hagar, Anthony and Cherone in the mix prior to Eddie's illness. He also stated that Eddie had been excited about reuniting with Anthony, Hagar, and Cherone. In August 2023, Wolfgang affirmed that there were no plans for a Van Halen reunion and stated that the band "doesn't exist anymore".

In October and November 2024, Alex Van Halen announced that he has been going through the band's various backlog of unreleased songs and his intentions to release the material as a tribute to his deceased brother. He stated: "There are so many different variables in a band like ours. We don't just walk in the studio and plan, 'Let's make a record,' although we have done that to some degree. But it's not a mechanical process for us. We go in and we play and see what happens, listen to it, invite a couple of people and then see what happens with that. ...But now that Ed's gone, none of those things are really valid because all I have, and Wolf has, is all the recordings in the vault. And they will stay there until we figure out how and why and what to do with them. And again, you have to remember, it has to be on the level of where Ed and I, where we used to play." The musician explained that there is enough material for three to four complete albums.

Alex detailed that in addition to the need for collaboration with other musicians to complete these variety of songs, he has looked into the potential use of AI to duplicate the style of guitar work by his brother, Eddie Van Halen. Additionally, he expressed interest in hiring Robert Plant as the vocalist for the future albums. He additionally announced plans to develop a biopic about the band's formation.

== Contract riders ==
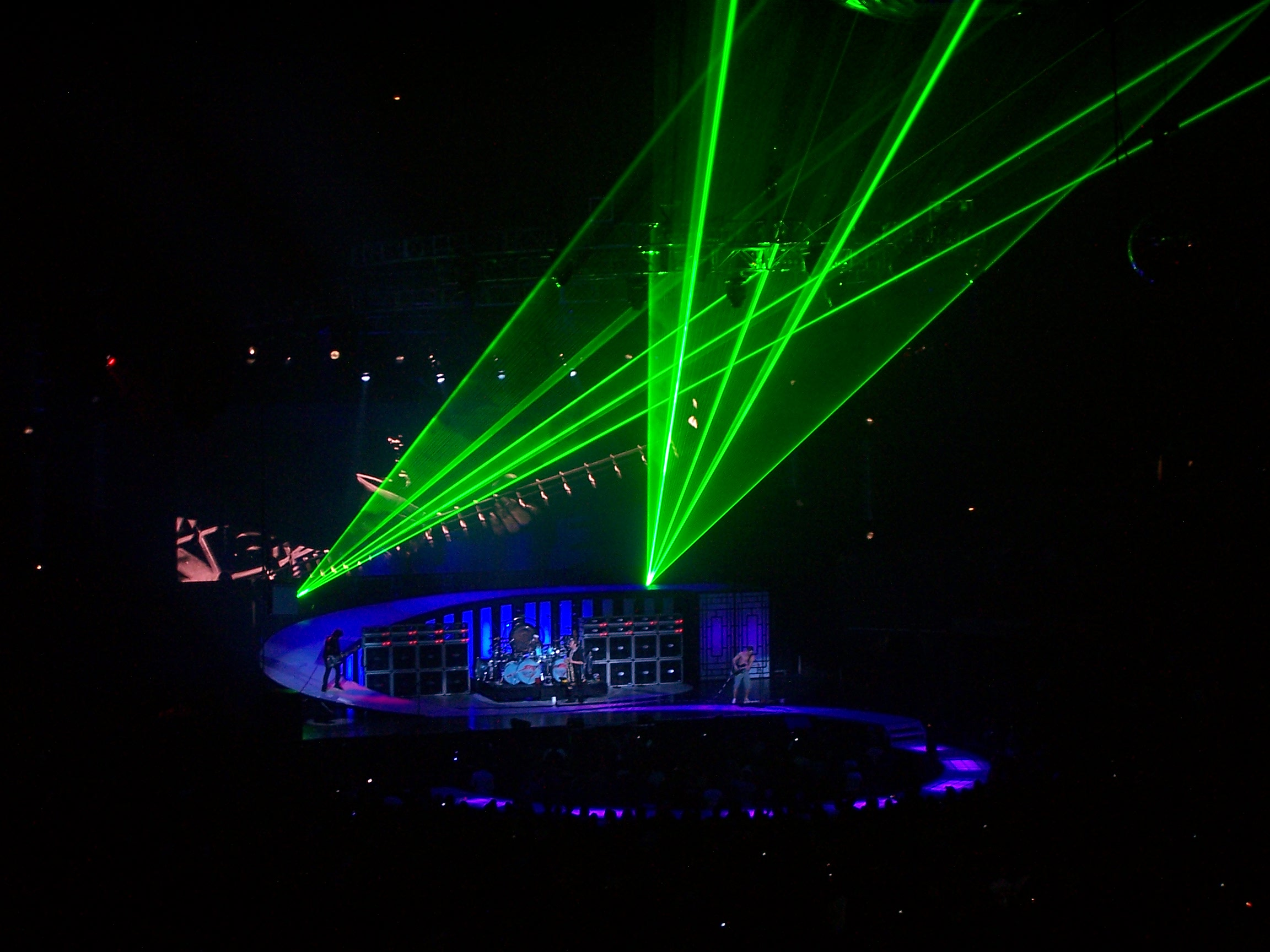
Van Halen's elaborate stage productions required extra security included in their contract riders

The complex technical demands of a Van Halen tour ultimately had a notable side-effect on modern pop music tours, especially via the concert's technical contract rider. The band used contract riders to verify the venue's power availability, security, structural and weight distribution details. Their riders specified that a bowl of M&M's candies was to be placed in their dressing room and, separately, in a different area of the contract, that all of the brown M&M's were to be removed. According to manager Noel Monk and Roth, this was listed in the technical portion of the contract as a test to see if the electrical, structural, security, and safety requirements in the rider had been thoroughly observed. If the bowl, without brown M&Ms was present, then the band, management and crew would assume the other, more legitimate concerns in the technical rider were fulfilled; conversely, if the bowl was missing, or brown M&M's were present, then management could have their crew or the venue inspect the work, redo it or even cancel the night's production at the venue's expense. However, different groups are responsible for each aspect of show production, so these are not necessarily related. The band's rider became well known as a running joke used by the band and venues for publicity.

In one 1980 incident, contracted caterers at what is now Colorado State University Pueblo refused to honor the request, leading the band to go on a rampage that involved throwing food all over a dining area as well as "unmentionable" acts in a nearby restroom. However, even more damage was caused to the basketball floor in the gymnasium due to the weight of the stage brought in.

== Musical style ==
Van Halen's musical style has been described as hard rock, heavy metal, AOR, pop rock, and glam metal. The band's early material has been described as a "party-ready pop metal sound" spearheaded by David Lee Roth's "over-the-top" vocal style, while their later material has been described as "milder" and "more accessible".

The band's music was considered to be ahead of its time. Despite forming and releasing their debut album during the 1970s, Loudwire stated that the band's music exhibited the "attitude, aesthetic and charisma of the '80s." The publication stated the opinion that they were among the "Big Four" bands of '80s rock, along with Guns N' Roses, Mötley Crüe and Def Leppard.

== Band members ==
Final lineup

- Eddie Van Halen – guitar (1972–2020; his death), backing vocals (1974–2020; his death), keyboards (1979–1997); lead vocals (1972–1974, 1997)
- Alex Van Halen – drums (1972–2020); occasional backing vocals (1982–1983, 1990–1991)
- David Lee Roth – lead vocals, occasional acoustic guitar and synthesizer (1974–1985, 1996, 2006–2020)
- Wolfgang Van Halen – bass, backing vocals (2006–2020)

Former

- Mark Stone – bass, backing vocals (1972–1974; died 2020)
- Michael Anthony – bass, backing vocals (1974–2006); occasional synthesizer (1980–1984)
- Sammy Hagar – lead vocals, guitar (1985–1996, 2003–2005)
- Gary Cherone – lead vocals (1996–1999)

=== Lineups ===
Period	Members	Releases
1972–1974 (Note: During the time the band was known as "Genesis" and "Mammoth".)	Eddie Van Halen – guitar, lead vocals; Mark Stone – bass, backing vocals; Alex Van Halen – drums	none
1974–1985 (Note: "Van Halen" from this point on.)	David Lee Roth – lead vocals, acoustic guitar; Eddie Van Halen – guitar, keyboards, backing vocals; Michael Anthony – bass, backing vocals, occasional live keyboards; Alex Van Halen – drums	Van Halen (1978); Van Halen II (1979); Women and Children First (1980); Fair Warning (1981); Diver Down (1982); 1984 (1984)
1985–1996	Sammy Hagar – lead vocals, rhythm and occasional live lead guitar; Eddie Van Halen – guitar, keyboards, backing vocals; Michael Anthony – bass, backing vocals; Alex Van Halen – drums	5150 (1986); OU812 (1988); For Unlawful Carnal Knowledge (1991); Right Here, Right Now (1993); Balance (1995); "Humans Being" (1996)
1996	David Lee Roth – lead vocals; Eddie Van Halen – guitar, backing vocals, keyboards; Michael Anthony – bass, backing vocals; Alex Van Halen – drums	New tracks for Best Of – Volume I (1996)
1996–1999	Gary Cherone – lead vocals; Eddie Van Halen – guitar, keyboards, backing vocals; Michael Anthony – bass, backing vocals; Alex Van Halen – drums	Van Halen III (1998)
2003–2005	Sammy Hagar – lead vocals, rhythm guitar; Eddie Van Halen – guitar, studio bass, backing vocals; Michael Anthony – live bass, backing vocals; Alex Van Halen – drums	New tracks for The Best of Both Worlds (2004)
2006–2020	David Lee Roth – lead vocals, acoustic guitar, studio keyboards; Eddie Van Halen – guitar, backing vocals; Wolfgang Van Halen – bass, backing vocals; Alex Van Halen – drums	A Different Kind of Truth (2012); Tokyo Dome (2015)

== Discography ==
- Van Halen (1978)
- Van Halen II (1979)
- Women and Children First (1980)
- Fair Warning (1981)
- Diver Down (1982)
- 1984 (1984)
- 5150 (1986)
- OU812 (1988)
- For Unlawful Carnal Knowledge (1991)
- Balance (1995)
- Van Halen III (1998)
- A Different Kind of Truth (2012)

== Concert tours ==
- 1978 World Tour
- World Vacation Tour (1979)
- World Invasion Tour (1980)
- Fair Warning Tour (1981)
- Hide Your Sheep Tour (1982–1983)
- 1984 Tour
- 5150 Tour (1986)
- OU812 Tour (1988–1989)
- For Unlawful Carnal Knowledge Tour (1991–1992)
- Right Here Right Now Tour (1993)
- Balance Tour (1995)
- III Tour (1998)
- Summer Tour 2004
- North American Tour 2007–2008
- A Different Kind of Truth Tour (2012–2013)
- North American Tour 2015

== Awards and nominations ==
Van Halen's For Unlawful Carnal Knowledge won two awards in the 1992 season: Best Hard Rock Performance at the 34th Annual Grammy Awards, and Favorite Heavy Metal/Hard Rock Album at the American Music Awards. The band has received an additional two Grammy nominations and eight further AMA nominations. The video for their 1992 single "Right Now" won three awards (of seven nominations) at the 1992 MTV Video Music Awards including the prestigious title of Video of the Year. The band's videos had previously been nominated for four VMAs, with "Jump" winning Award for Best Stage Performance at the inaugural MTV Video Music Awards in 1984.

== See also ==
- List of artists who reached number one in the United States
- List of artists who reached number one on the U.S. Mainstream Rock chart
