= Women and Children First =

Studio album by Van Halen
- Released: March 26, 1980
- Recorded: December 1979 – February 1980
- Studios: Sunset Sound, Hollywood, California
- Genres: Hard rock; heavy metal
- Length: 33:35
- Label: Warner Bros.
- Producer: Ted Templeman

Van Halen chronology
Van Halen II (1979)	Women and Children First (1980)	Fair Warning (1981)

Singles from Women and Children First
- 1. "And the Cradle Will Rock..." Released: April 1980

Women and Children First is the third studio album by American rock band Van Halen, released on March 26, 1980, on Warner Bros. Records. Produced by Ted Templeman and engineered by Donn Landee, it was the first Van Halen album without any cover songs. Critic Stephen Thomas Erlewine called it the "record where the group started to get heavier, both sonically and, to a lesser extent, thematically."

== Background and recording ==
The opening track, "And the Cradle Will Rock..." begins with what sounds like a guitar, but is actually a phase shifter-effected Wurlitzer electric piano played through Eddie Van Halen's 1960s model 100-watt Marshall Plexi amplifier.

Like the two preceding albums, Women and Children First was recorded in Hollywood at Sunset Studios, in about two weeks. The album has more studio overdubs and less emphasis on backing vocals.

This was partly because two of the songs, "In a Simple Rhyme" and "Take Your Whiskey Home", had been written and recorded six years earlier, before Michael Anthony had joined the band. The songs had been recorded as demos at Cherokee Studios; the versions on Women and Children First had some differences lyrically and musically. Two other songs had also been played live earlier: "Fools" as early as 1975, while "Loss of Control" debuted in 1977.

"Could This Be Magic?" contains the only female backing vocal ever recorded for a Van Halen song: Nicolette Larson sings during some of the choruses. The rain sound in the background is not an effect; it was raining outside, and the band decided to record the sound in stereo using two Neumann KM84 microphones, and added it to the track.

The album contains a track at the end of "In a Simple Rhyme," a brief instrumental piece entitled "Growth," beginning at 4:19. While "Growth" faded out on the original vinyl LP and cassette, it was given a cold ending at full volume on the compact disc. At the time, the band was considering starting what would become their next album, Fair Warning, with a continuation of "Growth," but did not. "Growth" was a staple of the band's live shows with Roth and often used as the start of their encores.

Several outtakes from these sessions exist, including an unreleased instrumental often referred to as "Act Like It Hurts," which was the title Eddie Van Halen originally wanted for "Tora! Tora!". "Act Like It Hurts" was also the source of a riff used for "House of Pain," released on 1984.

The first single from the album was the keyboard-driven "And the Cradle Will Rock..." Although the single was not as successful as previous release "Dance the Night Away" or the cover of "You Really Got Me," the album itself was well-received, went platinum within a year and further entrenched the band as a popular concert draw. The song "Everybody Wants Some!!" was also a concert staple through the 1984 tour, and continued to be played by David Lee Roth after he left Van Halen.

The vinyl LP version included a poster of a photograph by Helmut Newton featuring Roth chained to a fence.

== Critical reception ==
Professional ratings
Review scores
Source	Rating
AllMusic	4.5/5 stars
Christgau's Record Guide: The '80s	B
The Rolling Stone Album Guide	2.5/5 stars

Reviews for Women and Children First were generally favorable. David Fricke for Rolling Stone highlighted the songs, "Romeo Delight", "Everybody Wants Some!!", and "Loss of Control", calling them "works of high-volume art". Fricke praised the band, calling them "exceptionally good players". Both Fricke and Robert Christgau compared Eddie's guitar work to Jimi Hendrix. Christgau gave the album a B rating, stating, "[Eddie] earns the Hendrix comparisons, and he's no clone—he's faster, colder, more structural." In a retrospective review for AllMusic, Stephen Thomas Erlewine called the album "mature, or at least ... a little serious", noting "there's a bit of a dark heart beating on this record".

Kerrang! listed the album at number 30 among the "100 Greatest Heavy Metal Albums of All Time", and Rolling Stone listed the album at number 36 in their list of "The 100 Greatest Metal Albums of All Time".

== Track listing ==
All tracks are written by Edward Van Halen, Alex Van Halen, Michael Anthony, and David Lee Roth.

Side one
No.	Title	Length
1.	"And the Cradle Will Rock..."	3:31
2.	"Everybody Wants Some!!"	5:05
3.	"Fools"	5:55
4.	"Romeo Delight"	4:19

Side two
No.	Title	Length
5.	"Tora! Tora!" (Instrumental)	0:57
6.	"Loss of Control"	2:36
7.	"Take Your Whiskey Home"	3:09
8.	"Could This Be Magic?"	3:08
9.	"In a Simple Rhyme" "Growth" (hidden track)	4:20; 0:20
Total length:		33:35

== Personnel ==
Van Halen

- David Lee Roth – lead vocals, acoustic guitar on "Could This Be Magic?"
- Edward Van Halen – guitars, backing vocals, electric piano on "And the Cradle Will Rock..."
- Michael Anthony – bass guitar, backing vocals
- Alex Van Halen – drums

Additional musicians

- Nicolette Larson – backing vocals on "Could This Be Magic?"

Production

- Pete Angelus – creative consultant
- Chris Bellman – remastering
- Donn Landee – engineer
- Gene Meros – engineer
- Jo Motta – project coordinator
- Helmut Newton – poster photo
- Norman Seeff – cover photo
- Richard Seireeni – art direction
- Ted Templeman – production

== Charts ==
=== Weekly charts ===
Chart (1980)	Peak position
Canada Top Albums/CDs (RPM)	12
Dutch Albums (Album Top 100)	3
German Albums (Offizielle Top 100)	19
Japanese Albums (Oricon)	25
New Zealand Albums (RMNZ)	15
Norwegian Albums (VG-lista)	23
Swedish Albums (Sverigetopplistan)	19
UK Albums (Official Charts)	15
US Billboard 200	6

Chart (2021)	Peak position
Hungarian Albums (MAHASZ)	34

=== Year-end Charts ===
Chart (1980)	Position
Canada RPM Top 100 Albums	43
Dutch Albums (Album Top 100)	38
US Billboard 200	51

== Certifications ==
Region	Certification	Certified units/sales
Canada (Music Canada)	2× Platinum	200,000^{^}
France (SNEP)	Gold	100,000^{*}
Netherlands (NVPI)	Gold	50,000^{^}
Japan (RIAJ)	Gold	100,000^{^}
United States (RIAA)	3× Platinum	3,000,000^{^}
^{*} Sales figures based on certification alone.^{^} Shipments figures based on certification alone.
