= Fair Warning (Van Halen album) =

- The album cover is taken from a painting by William Kurelek.

Studio album by Van Halen
- Released: April 29, 1981
- Recorded: March–April 1981
- Studios: Sunset Sound Recorders, Hollywood, California
- Genres: Hard rock; heavy metal
- Length: 31:11
- Label: Warner Bros.
- Producer: Ted Templeman

Van Halen chronology
Women and Children First (1980)	Fair Warning (1981)	Diver Down (1982)

Singles from Fair Warning
- 1. "So This Is Love?" Released: June 1981 (US); 2. "Unchained" Released: July 1981 (Europe); 3. "Mean Street" Released: 1981 (Europe); 4. "Hear About It Later" Released: 1981 (NL)

Fair Warning is the fourth studio album by American rock band Van Halen. Released on April 29, 1981, by Warner Bros. Records, the album peaked at number 5 on the Billboard 200, while the single "So This Is Love?" failed to reach Billboard Hot 100, peaking at number 110 on the Bubbling-Under list. The album sold more than two million copies in the United States, but was still the band's slowest-selling album of the David Lee Roth era. Despite the album's commercially disappointing sales, Fair Warning was met with mostly positive reviews from critics. It was listed by Esquire as one of the "75 Albums Every Man Should Own".

== Packaging ==
The album's cover artwork features (in parts differently composed) details from The Maze, a painting by Canadian artist William Kurelek, which depicts his tortured youth.

The album's cover artwork is accompanied by an insert of a black-and-white portrait of the members of the band, in addition to another black-and-white photo of an exterior wall featuring cracked windows and a lyric from the album's opening song "Mean Street" in handwritten graffiti. This second photo was taken by famed rock photographer Neil Zlozower.

== Critical reception ==
Professional ratings
Review scores
Source	Rating
AllMusic	4/5 stars
Christgau's Record Guide: The '80s	B−
Record Mirror	2.5/5 stars
The Rolling Stone Album Guide	2.5/5 stars

The Village Voice's Robert Christgau rated Fair Warning a B−, signifying "a competent or mildly interesting record usually featuring at least three worthwhile cuts." It featured "not just Eddie's latest sound effects, but a few good jokes along with the mean ones and a rhythm section that can handle punk speed emotionally and technically." He also explained "at times Eddie could even be said to play an expressive – lyrical? – role. Of course, what he's expressing is hard to say. Technocracy putting a patina on cynicism".

A retrospective review by AllMusic's Stephen Thomas Erlewine found the album fairly positive. In the review, he initially stated "it's a dark, strange beast, partially because it lacks any song as purely fun as the hits from the first three records" and "whatever the reason, Fair Warning winds up as a dark, dirty, nasty piece of work [...] Dull it is not and Fair Warning contains some of the fiercest, hardest music Van Halen ever made. There's little question Eddie Van Halen won whatever internal skirmishes they had, [...] even with the lack of a single dedicated instrumental showcase."

The Rolling Stone Album Guide, however, gave the album two-and-a-half stars out of five, stating that "the most significant musical development is the synthesizer introduced at the end of Fair Warning, which would be exploited to greater effect on later albums."

== Track listing ==
All tracks are written by Edward Van Halen, Alex Van Halen, Michael Anthony, and David Lee Roth.

Side one
No.	Title	Length
1.	"Mean Street"	4:58
2.	"Dirty Movies"	4:08
3.	"Sinner's Swing!"	3:09
4.	"Hear About It Later"	4:35

Side two
No.	Title	Length
5.	"Unchained"	3:29
6.	"Push Comes to Shove"	3:49
7.	"So This Is Love?"	3:06
8.	"Sunday Afternoon in the Park" (instrumental)	1:59
9.	"One Foot Out the Door"	1:58
Total length:		31:11

== Personnel ==
=== Van Halen ===
- David Lee Roth – lead vocals
- Edward Van Halen – guitar, synthesizers, backing vocals
- Michael Anthony – bass guitar, backing vocals
- Alex Van Halen – drums

=== Production ===
- Pete Angelus – cover design
- Chris Bellman – remastering
- Gregg Geller – remastering
- Greg Gorman – photography, inlay photos
- William Kurelek – cover artwork, from The Maze
- Donn Landee – engineer
- Gene Meros – engineer
- Jo Motta – project coordinator
- Richard Seireeni – art direction
- Ted Templeman – producer
- Neil Zlozower – photography

== Charts ==
=== Weekly charts ===
Chart (1981)	Peak position
Australia Albums (Kent Music Report)	97
Canada Top Albums/CDs (RPM)	11
Dutch Albums (Album Top 100)	13
Finnish Albums (The Official Finnish Charts)	20
German Albums (Offizielle Top 100)	37
Japanese Albums (Oricon)	61
Norwegian Albums (VG-lista)	27
Swedish Albums (Sverigetopplistan)	18
UK Albums (Official Charts)	49
US Billboard 200	5

=== Year-end charts ===
Chart (1981)	Position
US Billboard 200	71

== Certifications ==
Region	Certification	Certified units/sales
Canada (Music Canada)	Platinum	100,000^{^}
United States (RIAA)	2× Platinum	2,000,000^{^}
^{^} Shipments figures based on certification alone.
