= The End (Mammoth song) =

2025 song by Mammoth

Single by Mammoth

from the album The End
- Released: May 1, 2025
- Length: 3:33
- Label: BMG
- Songwriter: Wolfgang Van Halen
- Producer: Michael "Elvis" Baskette

Mammoth singles chronology
"I'm Alright" (2023)	"The End" (2025)	"The Spell" (2025)

Music video
- "The End" on YouTube

"The End" is a song by American rock band Mammoth. It was released on May 1, 2025, as a single from Wolfgang Van Halen's third studio album, The End. The song marked the first release by Mammoth following the removal of the "WVH" suffix from the band's name. It topped the Billboard Mainstream Rock Airplay chart in August 2025.

== Background and release ==
"The End" was the first release by Mammoth following the removal of the "WVH" initials from the band's name. Wolfgang described the track as "over-the-top and shreddy" while also calling it "melodic and controlled", saying that he was doing different things on the record. He said the song's tapping pattern originated from a 2014 demo that had initially been set aside before he revisited it and built a song around it. He added that he was "maybe worried about too many comparisons" regarding guitar tapping, but later said that "at the end of the day I've realized that's going to happen either way" and that he "might as well just have fun and enjoy myself". He also said that he used Eddie Van Halen's "Frankenstein" guitar to record the song's slap part. He added that the Los Angeles wildfires inspired the song's lyrics, adding that "The End" was about acceptance.

The song was released alongside a music video.

== Composition ==
The song was developed with producer Michael "Elvis" Baskette, a returning collaborator of Van Halen's. Wolfgang noted that the song's intro contains a callback to Van Halen's "Source of Infection" from OU812, saying: "There's a little callback in the intro to 'Source of Infection' off of Van Halen's OU812, where I think maybe Donn Landee says 'Take one'... I actually yelled that into the pickup of the guitar on 'The End'". He said the song's verse riff originated as a slap bass idea that he demonstrated on guitar, after which Baskette suggested continuing with guitar for the part.

The song opens with a two-handed tapping riff, and features fast-paced verse sections and a melodic chorus.

== Reception ==
Heavy Consequence praised Wolfgang Van Halen's guitar playing and vocals. Philip Wilding of Classic Rock described the song as a mix of classic Van Halen and 1980s Rush. Steve Beebee of Kerrang! said that "The End" put Wolfgang's musicianship and melody into "an explosive little capsule". Reviewing the album, Rock 'N' Load praised the song's "killer tapping intro" and "killer riff/hybrid picking technique", while Distorted Sound praised the song's opening electric-guitar composition, describing it as "impossible not to be impressed" by. Spill Magazine wrote that "The End", "The Spell" and "I Really Wanna" showed a "slightly meaner sound" from Wolfgang Van Halen. James Christopher Monger of AllMusic identified "The End" as one of the album's standout tracks.

Loudwire ranked "The End" at No. 1 on its list of best rock songs of 2025.

== Music video ==
Wolfgang Van Halen drafted the concept for the music video, which was directed by Robert Rodriguez, with horror effects artist Greg Nicotero creating zombies, werewolves and vampires. The video depicts the band performing at a bar reminiscent of From Dusk Till Dawn's Titty Twister, where they are greeted by Danny Trejo. It features appearances by Slash, Myles Kennedy, Valerie Bertinelli, and Wolfgang's wife, and opens with the disclaimer: "Due to my strong personal convictions, I wish to stress that this film in no way endorses a belief in the occult." The video begins and ends with an homage to Michael Jackson's "Thriller" video, including a shot of Wolfgang turning toward the camera with yellow eyes. Loudwire also noted that the video features recurring "Wolfgang" characters from previous Mammoth videos, who are revealed to have set up the encounter in an attempt to regain their presence in the band.

== Track listing ==
"The End" single
No.	Title	Length
1.	"The End"	3:33

== Live performances ==
Mammoth performed "The End" at WDHA's "Mammoth For Ya' Mama!" event at Debonair Music Hall in Teaneck, New Jersey, on May 11, 2025. An acoustic version of the song was performed at Rock Fore Down Syndrome during the 2nd Annual Tremonti Family Charity Golf Tournament in Nashville on October 2, 2025. Wolfgang commented that "trying to do the tapping acoustically" was "very funny".

== Chart performance ==
"The End" reached number one on the Billboard Mainstream Rock Airplay chart on August 2, 2025, becoming Mammoth's third song to top the chart.

== Personnel ==
Credits adapted from Apple Music.

Mammoth

- Wolfgang Van Halen – vocals, all instruments, songwriter

Additional credits

- Michael "Elvis" Baskette – producer, mixing engineer, recording engineer
- Brad Blackwood – mastering engineer
- Josh Saldate – assistant mixing engineer, additional engineer
- Jeff Moll – editing engineer, recording engineer

== Charts ==
=== Weekly charts ===
Weekly chart performance for "The End"
Chart (2025)	Peak position
Canada Mainstream Rock (Billboard Canada)	7
Czech Republic Rock (IFPI)	14
US Rock & Alternative Airplay (Billboard)	11
US Mainstream Rock Airplay (Billboard)	1

=== Year-end charts ===
Year-end chart performance for "The End"
Chart (2025)	Position
Canada Mainstream Rock (Billboard)	28
US Rock & Alternative Airplay (Billboard)	48
US Mainstream Rock Airplay (Billboard)	28
