= Kramer Focus =

The Kramer Focus is a series of electric guitars and electric basses manufactured by Kramer Guitars, currently owned by Gibson.

== The Focus ==
The Focus was one of Kramer's first models manufactured and then imported from Japan. There were three superstrat-styled models, all of which featured the popular Floyd Rose tremolo. The Focus 1000 sported a single slanted humbucker, similar to the Kramer Baretta. The 2000 sported two humbuckers, thus resembling a Kramer Pacer Imperial. The "'3000'" sported a HSS configuration on a Fender Stratocaster-type pickguard. The 6000 sported a HSS configuration, like the Kramer Pacer. earlier 6000 configurations had 3 individual switches for pickup switching, in 1988 Kramer switched to a regular 5-way lever switch. The other two guitars both sported two humbuckers and a Floyd Rose and were distinguished by body shape. The 4000 sported a Gibson Flying V shape, and was later changed to more closely resemble a Jackson Randy Rhoads or Kramer Vanguard with 2 Humbucker, 3-way switch, 1 volume, and one tone. The 5000 model resembles the Kramer Voyager, and also came with a triple humbucker configuration. There were also three basses in the line. The 77 featured a split pickup, while the 88 featured a full-size humbucker. The 8000 has a Z shape, resembling the Kramer Condor bass, and features two split pickups.

== Floyd Rose tailpiece ==
The Floyd Rose vibrato tailpiece on the guitars was later replaced with the Vintage tremolo seen more often on Fender Stratocasters in the early 1990s after a lawsuit with Rose himself over royalties.

== Bankruptcy ==
Kramer declared bankruptcy in 1989 and was then purchased by Music Yo then later by Gibson. Kramer still manufactures the Focus series today, though the only guitar now more closely resembles a Fender Stratocaster, with a vintage-style 6-screw tremolo.

== See also ==
- Kramer Guitars
- Gibson Guitars
- Kramer Pacer
- Eddie Van Halen
- Fender Stratocaster
