= The Spell (Mammoth song) =

2025 song by Mammoth

Single by Mammoth

from the album The End
- Released: July 9, 2025
- Genre: Hard rock
- Length: 3:29
- Label: I Am the Sheriff; BMG
- Songwriter: Wolfgang Van Halen
- Producer: Michael "Elvis" Baskette

Mammoth singles chronology
| "The End" (2025) | "The Spell" (2025) |

Music video
- "The Spell" on YouTube

"The Spell" is a song by American rock band Mammoth. It was released on July 9, 2025, as the second single from the band's third studio album, The End. It topped the Billboard Mainstream Rock Airplay chart in February 2026.

== Background and composition ==
Wolfgang Van Halen characterized "The Spell" as having a "woozy seventies rock vibe" and said the song featured vocal runs he previously would not have attempted. He also called it a "good-feeling song", stating that listeners who were not interested in musical technicality could enjoy it, while noting that "cool riffs and drum fills" were also present. The song was described as opening with a palm-muted groove and featuring an "incisive riff" over an "off-kilter drumbeat".

Consequence characterized the song as a melodic hard rock track.

== Release and promotion ==
"The Spell" was released on July 9, 2025, alongside the announcement of Mammoth's third studio album, The End. The single was accompanied by a performance video featuring Wolfgang Van Halen playing multiple instruments. A video of the band performing an acoustic version of the song for Apple Music's "Zane Lowe Show" was published on March 25, 2026.

== Reception ==
In a review of The End, Gerrod Harris of Spill Magazine wrote that singles including "The Spell" had a "slightly meaner sound", while James Christopher Monger for AllMusic identified "The Spell" as one of the album's standout tracks.

== Music video ==
The music video was directed by Gordy De St. Jeor, and depicts four versions of Wolfgang Van Halen performing together, similar to the band's 2021 video for "Don't Back Down".

== Track listing ==
All tracks are written by Wolfgang Van Halen.

"The Spell" single
| No. | Title | Length |
|---|---|---|
| 1. | "The Spell" | 3:29 |
| 2. | "The End" | 3:33 |
| Total length: | | 7:02 |

== Chart performance ==
"The Spell" became Mammoth's fourth number-one single on the Billboard Mainstream Rock Airplay chart when it topped the chart on February 7, 2026.

== Personnel ==
Credits adapted from Apple Music.

Mammoth

- Wolfgang Van Halen – vocals, all instruments, songwriter

Additional credits

- Michael "Elvis" Baskette – producer, mixing engineer, recording engineer
- Brad Blackwood – mastering engineer
- Josh Saldate – assistant mixing engineer, additional engineer
- Jeff Moll – editing engineer, recording engineer

== Charts ==
Weekly chart performance for "The Spell"
| Chart (2025–2026) | Peak position |
|---|---|
| Canada Mainstream Rock (Billboard Canada) | 16 |
| US Rock & Alternative Airplay (Billboard) | 9 |
| US Mainstream Rock Airplay (Billboard) | 1 |
