= List of Peavey guitars =

Peavey Guitars are electric, acoustic, and electric bass guitars branded by Peavey Electronics.

== List of models ==
=== Guitars ===
- Axcelerator Series
  - Axcelerator (made in USA 1994–1998)
  - Axcelerator AX (made in USA 1995–1998)
  - Axcelerator F (made in USA 1994)
- Cropper Classic (made in USA)

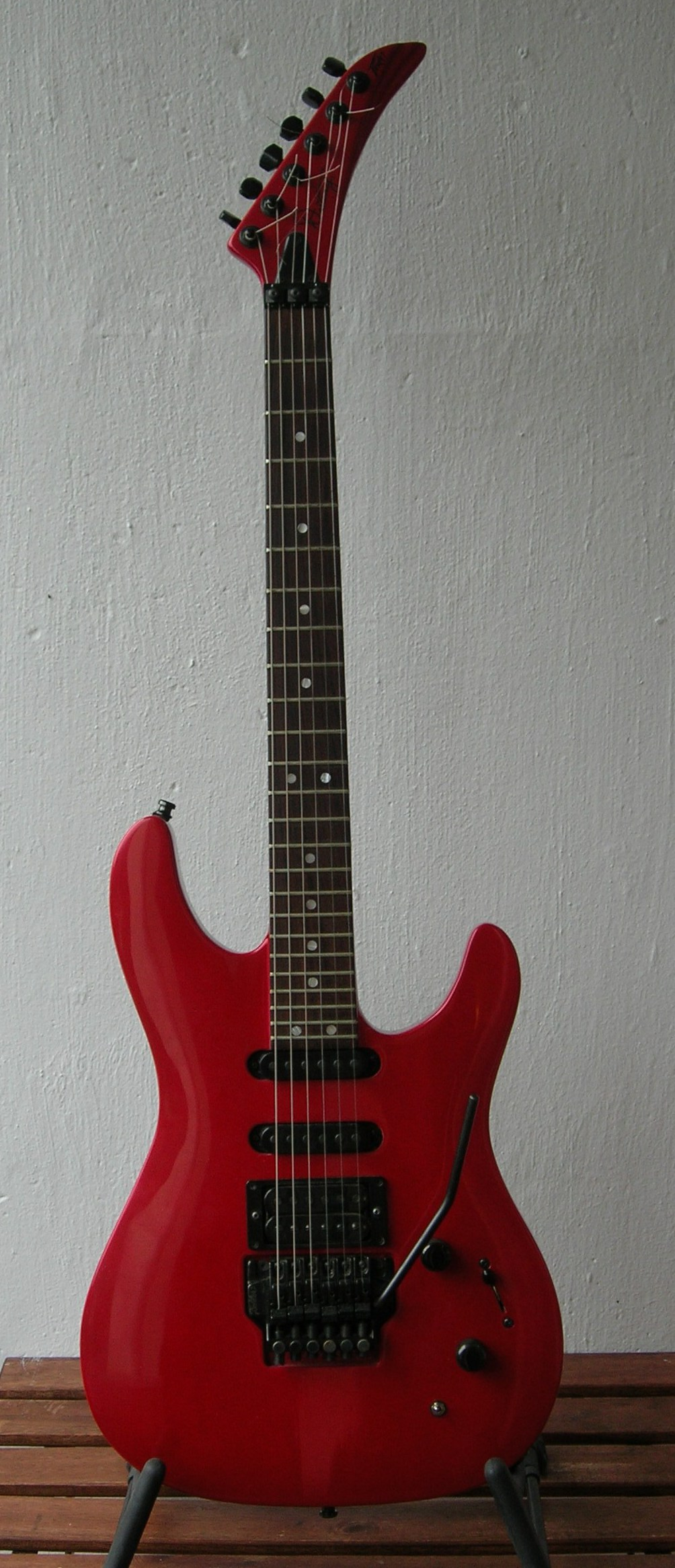
Peavey Destiny

- Destiny Series
  - Destiny (made in USA 1989–1994)
  - Destiny Custom (made in USA 1989–1994)
- Detonator Series
  - Detonator (made in USA)
  - Detonator AX (made in USA 1995–1998)
  - Detonator JX (made in USA)
- EVH Wolfgang Series (1996–2004)
  - EVH Wolfgang
  - EVH Wolfgang Special
- Falcon Series
  - Falcon (made in USA 1986–1988)
  - Falcon Active (made in USA 1988–1989)
  - Falcon Classic (made in USA 1988–1990)
  - Falcon Custom (Kahler tremolo – made in USA 1986–1988)
  - Falcon Custom (Power Bend II tremolo – made in USA 1989–1991)
  - Falcon 1 International Series (made in Korea)
  - Falcon Standard (made in USA 1989–1991)

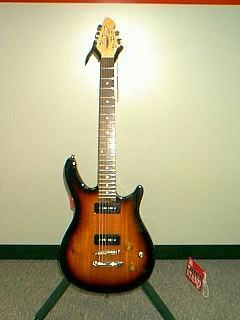
Leakesville Firenza in Mahogany burst

- Firenza Series
  - Impact Firenza (see Impact Series)
  - Firenza (made in Leakesville MS, USA 1998–2002)
  - Firenza AX (made in Leakesville MS, USA 1998–2002)
  - Firenza JX (made in Leakesville MS, USA 1998–2002)
- G-90 (made in USA)
- Generation Series
  - Generation Custom (made in USA 1989–1994)
  - Generation Custom ACM (made in USA)
  - Generation Custom EX
  - Generation EX (made in China)
  - Generation EXP
  - Generation EXP ACM (made in Korea)
  - Generation EXP Custom ACM
  - Generation S-1 (made in USA 1988–1994)
  - Generation S-2 (made in USA 1990–1994)
  - Generation S-3 (made in USA 1991–1994)
  - Generation Standard (made in USA 1989–1994)
  - Generation Triple/Single EX (made in China)
  - Generation Vintage EX (made in China)
- Hartley Peavey Signature Series
  - Hartley Peavey Signature EX
  - Hartley Peavey Signature EXP (made in Korea)
  - Hartley Peavey Signature Select
  - Hartley Peavey Signature USA Custom (made in USA)
- Hartley Peavey Special Series
  - Hartley Peavey Special CT USA (made in USA)
  - Hartley Peavey Special EX
  - Hartley Peavey Special USA (made in USA)
- Horizon Series
  - Horizon (made in USA 1983–1986)
  - Horizon II (made in USA 1983–1986)
  - Horizon II Custom (made in USA 1984–1985)
- Hydra Series
  - Hydra (made in USA)
  - Jeff Cook Signature Model (made in USA)
- Impact Series
  - Impact 1 (made in USA 1985–1987); 1993 only reissue was Made in USA, set neck, hard tail, and 3 per side tuners
  - Impact 1 Unity (made in USA 1987–1989)
  - Impact 2 (made in USA 1985–1987); 1993 only reissue was Made in USA, set neck, Peavey Power Bend trem system, and 3 per side tuners
  - Impact Firenza (made in USA)
  - Impact Firenza AX (made in USA)
  - Impact Milano (made in USA)
  - Impact Torino I (made in USA)
  - Impact Torino II (made in USA)
- Jack Daniel's Series
  - Jack Daniel's EX
  - Jack Daniel's EXP
  - Jack Daniel's USA (made in USA)
- Jazz Fusion Series
  - JF-1 EXP (made in China) EX on guitar
  - JF-2 EXP (made in China)
- Limited Series
  - Limited HB (made in Leakesville, Mississippi, USA)
  - Limited ST (made in Leakesville, Mississippi, USA)
  - Limited VT (made in Leakesville, Mississippi, USA)
  - Limited STD (made in Leakesville, Mississippi, USA)
- Mantis Series
  - Mantis (made in USA 1984–1986)
  - Mantis LT (made in USA)
- Milestone Series
  - Milestone (made in USA 1983–1986)
  - Milestone 12-string (made in USA 1983–1986)
- Mystic (made in USA 1983–1986)
- Nitro Series
  - Nitro I (made in USA 1986–1989)
  - Nitro I Active (made in USA 1988–1990)
  - Nitro I Custom (made in USA 1987–1989)
  - Nitro II (made in USA 1987–1989)
  - Nitro III (made in USA 1987–1989)
  - Nitro III Custom (made in USA 1987–1989)
  - Nitro Limited (made in USA 1987–1990)
  - Nitro C-2 (made in USA 1990–1992)
  - Nitro C-3 (made in USA 1990–1992)
- Odyssey Series
  - Odyssey (made in USA 1990–1994)
  - Odyssey 25th Anniversary (made in USA 1990–1994); 250 total
  - Odyssey Custom (made in USA 1990–1994)
- Omniac JD USA (made in USA 2006–2009)
- Patriot Series
  - Patriot (made in USA 1983–1986)
  - Patriot Plus (made in USA 1983–1986)
- Predator Series
  - Predator (Kahler Flyer tremolo made in USA 1985–1988)
  - Predator (Power Bend tremolo made in USA)
  - Predator AX (made in USA 1995–1996)
  - Predator Plus (rosewood fingerboard version made in Korea and Vietnam)
  - Predator Plus (maple fingerboard version made in Vietnam only)
  - Predator Plus EXP (made in Korea and Indonesia)
  - Predator Plus HB (made in Korea)
- PXD Series
  - PXD Tomb
  - PXD Tragic
  - PXD Twenty-Three
  - PXD Vicious
  - PXD DT Vicious (Devin Townsend signature model)
  - PXD Void
- Raptor Series
  - Raptor I
  - Raptor II
  - Raptor III
  - Raptor Plus (made in Korea and China)
  - Raptor Plus EXP (made in Korea)
  - Raptor Plus TK (made in Korea)
  - Raptor Special
- Razer (made in USA 1983–1986)
- Reactor Series
  - Reactor (made in USA)
  - Reactor AX (made in USA 1995–1999)
- Rockingham
- Rotor Series
  - Rotor EX
  - Rotor EXP (bolt neck – made in Korea)
  - Rotor EXP (set neck – made in Korea)
  - Rotor EXP (locking tremolo – made in Indonesia)
  - Rotor EXP Limited (neck-through – made in Korea)
  - Rotor Special (single pickup)
- SC Series
  - SC-1
  - SC-2
  - SC-3
- T-Series
  - T-15 (made in USA 1982–1984)
  - T-25 (made in USA 1982–1983)
  - T-25 Special (made in USA 1982–1983)
  - T-26 (made in USA 1982–1983)
  - T-27 (made in USA 1982–1983)
  - T-27 Limited (made in USA 1982–1983)
  - T-30 (made in USA 1981–1983)
  - T-60 (made in USA 1978–1986)
- Tracer Series
  - Tracer (Power Bend tremolo) (made in USA 1988–1994)
  - Tracer Custom (made in USA 1989–1990)
  - Tracer Custom '89 (made in USA 1989–1991)
  - Tracer Deluxe (made in USA 1988–1990)
  - Tracer Deluxe '89 (made in USA 1989–1991)
  - Tracer LT (made in USA 1991–1994)
  - Tracer II (made in USA 1989–1990)
  - Tracer II '89 (made in USA 1989–1991)
- V-Type Series
  - V-Type NTB ST
  - V-Type NTB TR
  - V-Type EXP
  - V-Type U.S.A. (made in USA 2002–2004)
- Vortex Series
  - Vortex 1 (made in USA 1985–1986)
  - Vortex 2 (made in USA 1985–1986)
  - Vortex EX
- Vandenberg (made in USA)

=== Bass guitars ===
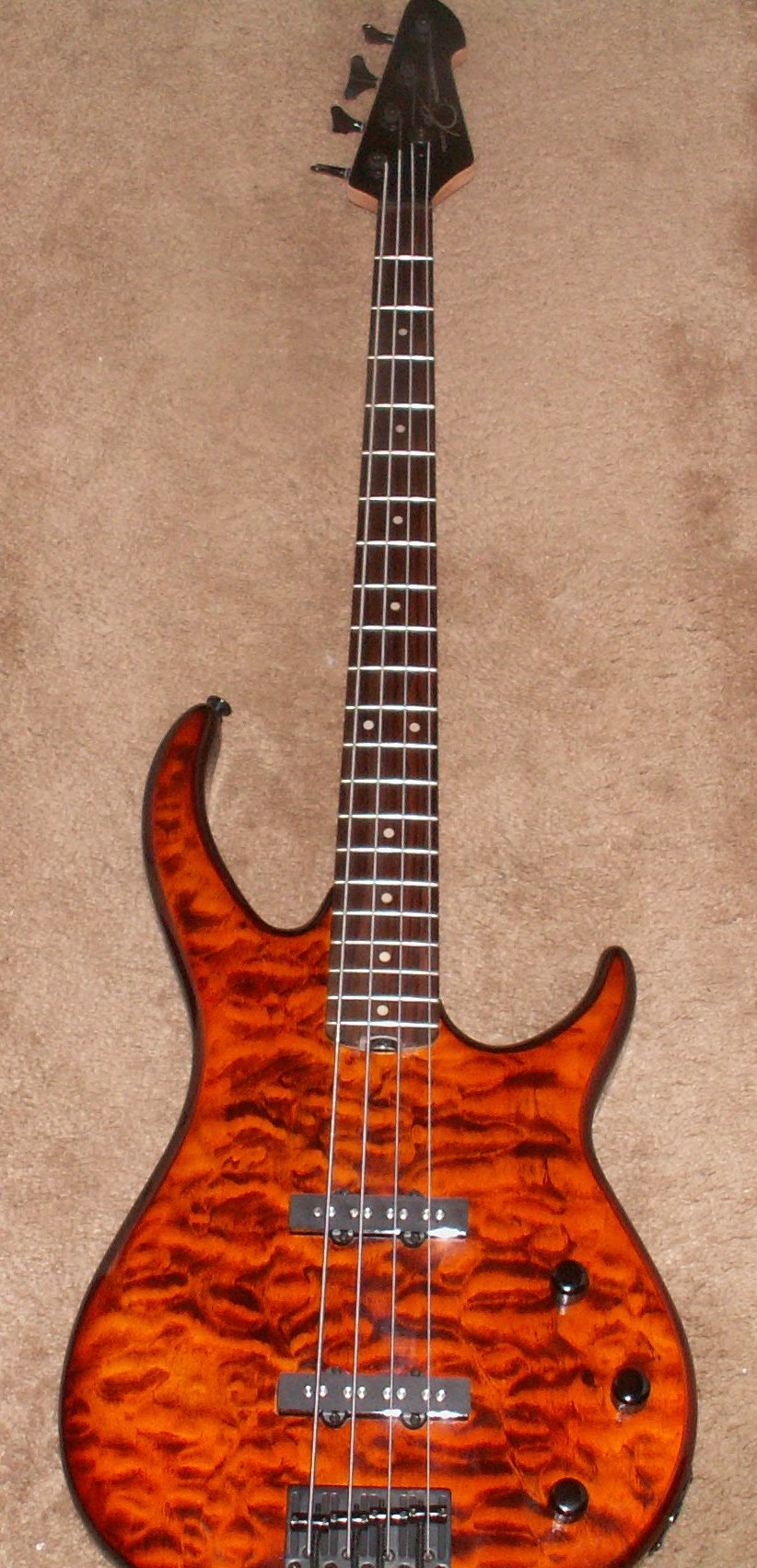
A Peavey Millennium BXP

- Axcelerator Series (made in USA)
  - 4 String (discontinued)
  - 5 String (discontinued)
  - 6 String (discontinued)
  - Axcelerator 2-T (discontinued)
- B-Quad (Brian Bromberg's signature, necks made by Modulus Guitars; made in USA)
  - 4 String (discontinued)
  - 5 String (discontinued)
- BXP Series (made in Vietnam)
- Cirrus Series (made in USA)
  - 4 String (discontinued)
  - 5 String (discontinued)
  - 6 String (discontinued)
- Cyberbass
  - 4 String (discontinued)
  - 5 String (discontinued)
- TL (Tim Landers's Signature Series (made in USA)
  - TL-5 5 String (discontinued)
  - TL-6 String (discontinued)
- Dyna-Bass Series (made in USA with design help from Tim Landers)
  - 4 String (discontinued)
  - 5 String (discontinued)
- Forum Series (made in USA)
  - Forum P/J (discontinued)
  - Forum AX (discontinued)
  - Forum Plus (discontinued)
- Foundation Series (made in USA)
  - Foundation S P/J Schaller Pickups (discontinued); script logo
  - Foundation 4 String VFL Pickups (discontinued); block logo
  - Foundation 5 String VFL Pickups (discontinued); block logo
  - Foundation 2000 (discontinued); block Logo
- Fury Series 4 string (made in USA)
  - 1st Generation Super Ferrite (discontinued); script logo
  - 2nd Generation Split P Bass Pickup (discontinued); block logo
  - 3rd Generation Split P bass Pickup (discontinued); block logo
  - Forum P/J Version of 3rd Generation Fury (discontinued); block logo
- Fury Series (made in Korea)
  - 4 String (discontinued)
  - 5 String (discontinued)
  - 6 String (discontinued)
- G-Bass (discontinued, made in USA)
- Grind Bass USA (made in USA)
  - 4 String P/J (discontinued)
  - 5 String J/J (discontinued)
- Grind Series (made in Vietnam/China)
  - 4 String
  - 5 String
  - 6 String
- Jack Daniel's USA
- Midibase
  - 4 String (discontinued)
- Milestone Series (made in Korea)
  - 4 String (discontinued)
  - 5 String (discontinued)
- Millennium & Millennium Plus USA
  - 4 String JJ (discontinued)
  - 5 String JJ (discontinued)
  - 4 String J/MM (discontinued)
  - 5 String J/MM (discontinued)
- Millennium International Series (made in Korea or Indonesia)
  - 4 String Passive (pictured)(discontinued)
  - 4 String Active (discontinued)
  - 5 String Passive (discontinued)
  - 5 String Active (discontinued)
- Patriot (made in USA – discontinued)
- RJ IV Randy Jackson Signature (U.S.A.) (discontinued)
- Sarzo Bass Rudy Sarzo Signature Model (U.S.A) (discontinued)
- T-Series (made in USA) (discontinued)
  - T-20 (discontinued)
  - T-40 (1978; discontinued)
  - T-45 (discontinued)
- Unity Passive (1990; made in USA – discontinued)
- Unity Series (1991; made in USA – discontinued)
- Unity Series Koa (1991; made in USA – discontinued)
- VWB Verdine White Signature Model (made in USA – discontinued)
- Zodiac Series (discontinued)
  - Zodiac BXP (discontinued)
  - Zodiac DE Scorpio (discontinued)

=== Acoustic guitars ===
- Aberdeen
- Briarwood DR Series
- Briarwood CL-1
- Briarwood DR-1
- Briarwood DR-112
- Briarwood DR-2ER
- Briarwood DR-3ER CDS
- Briarwood DR-3ERS
- Briarwood DR-4CA EQ
- Briarwood DR-4CA WR EQ
- Briarwood DR-5CA EQ QT
- Briarwood FL-1
- Ecoustic Series
  - Ecoustic (made in USA)
  - Ecoustic ATS (made in USA)
    - Indianola
- International Series
  - PVI-705 Classical
- Jack Daniel's Series
  - Jack Daniel's JD-AG1
  - Jack Daniel's JD-AG2
  - Jack Daniel's JD-AG3
- Route 61

=== Serial numbers ===
- Serial numbers correlate to shipping dates of US models only. 1978 to 1995. Imports designated by EX, EXP, or BXP are not serialized by year.
- 8Mxxxxxx ............................................1978
- 0000xxxx t/m 0030xxxx ........................1978
- 0031xxxx t/m 0047xxxx ........................1979
- 0048xxxx t/m 0065xxxx ........................1980
- 0066xxxx t/m 0094xxxx ........................1981
- 0100xxxx t/m 0129xxxx ........................1982
- 0130xxxx t/m 0169xxxx ........................1983
- 0170xxxx t/m 0199xxxx ........................1984
- 0200xxxx t/m 0239xxxx ........................1985
- 0240xxxx t/m 0259xxxx ........................1986
- 0260xxxx t/m 0339xxxx ........................1987
- 0340xxxx t/m 0359xxxx ........................1988
- 0360xxxx t/m 0419xxxx ........................1989
- 04249338 t/m 0439xxxx ........................1990
- 0440xxxx t/m 0519xxxx ........................1991
- 0520xxxx t/m 0599xxxx ........................1992
- 0600xxxx t/m 0639xxxx ........................1993
- 0640xxxx t/m 0769xxxx ........................1994
- 0770xxxx >>.........................................1995

== See also ==
- Peavey Electronics
- Hartley Peavey
