= Mammoth II =

Studio album by Mammoth
- Released: August 4, 2023
- Recorded: 2022–2023
- Studio: 5150 (Los Angeles)
- Genre: Rock
- Length: 48:07
- Label: BMG
- Producer: Michael Baskette

Mammoth chronology
Mammoth WVH (2021)	Mammoth II (2023)	The End (2025)

Singles from Mammoth II
- 1. "Another Celebration at the End of the World" Released: March 22, 2023; 2. "Like a Pastime" Released: May 8, 2023; 3. "Take a Bow" Released: June 27, 2023; 4. "I'm Alright" Released: August 1, 2023

Mammoth II is the second studio album by American rock band Mammoth. Similar to the band's first album, Mammoth WVH (2021), all writing, vocals, and instruments were performed by Wolfgang Van Halen. The album was released through I Am the Sheriff and BMG Rights Management on August 4, 2023.

== Background ==
Wolfgang Van Halen, son of Van Halen guitarist Eddie Van Halen, after years of performing for various bands, began branching out into writing his own solo music as early as 2014. His first album, written and recorded entirely on his own, was finished in 2018, but was not released until 2021, under the moniker Mammoth WVH (shortened in 2025 to simply "Mammoth"), in reference to one of Van Halen's early band names and his own initials. The release, Mammoth WVH, was a success, debuting at number one on the Billboard Top Rock Albums and Top Hard Rock Albums. After touring in support of the release for over a year, Wolfgang turned his focus on recording a follow-up album.

== Writing and recording ==
Work on the album began in September 2022. Starting the sessions were difficult for Wolfgang; while his father Eddie was not formally credited in the first album, he was still present for the sessions in the 2010s, and music was an area of bonding for the two. However, Eddie's death in 2020 meant that the sessions would be Wolfgang's first without him around. Despite this, the sessions were, by design, much quicker than the ones for the first album, as Wolfgang had already established the band's sound, and knew what worked and what didn't, making the album more about expanding upon what was already created. Similar to the first album, all writing, vocals and instrumentation - guitar, bass and drums - were performed by Wolfgang. The album was recorded in Eddie's 5150 Studios with music producer Michael "Elvis" Baskette.

== Themes and composition ==
Many of the songs are themed around Wolfgang processing his grief of losing his father, Eddie, who died in 2020. Wolfgang explained:

Everyone thinks the first album was me working through everything that had been happening, like losing my father. But that's not true. I finished [the first] album in 2018. This is the album where I'm working through everything that happened in my life since 2019, and that's a lot. I think that's why it ended up being a darker, heavier album".

Another common theme on the album was Wolfgang's reaction to negativity and toxic behavior he experienced online and on social media. Many songs are written from the perspective of him addressing an amalgamation of internet trolls he's experienced online. The track "I'm Alright" explores his personal reactions to people who attempt to boss him around in regards to how he should approach music. Wolfgang described it as his "anthem for telling people to fuck off". The track "Better Than You" is a more general observation about the internet that "everyone on the internet thinks they're better than everyone else, but they're really just as miserable as everyone else.

Publications noted the album sounded similar to work of the Foo Fighters, Alter Bridge and the "variety of hard rock that was favored in the first part of the 2000s". It features a greater emphasis on guitar solos than the debut album, the longest being the 90-second solo on the track "Take a Bow", which was performed by Wolfgang with Eddie's frankenstein guitar he recorded many early Van Halen songs on. Wolfgang described it as darker and heavier than his first album, with an emphasis on balancing "heaviness" and "melody", particularly on tracks "Right?" and "Better Than You". The track "Right?", which was written as the album's "mission statement", was given its name due an accident while recording the drum tracks where, when talking with a sound engineer, Wolfgang responded "Right?" so loudly that it was picked up on the drum mic; he liked how it sounded and retained it on the final recording. Wolfgang described "Better Than You" as his attempt to merge the sounds of The Beatles with metal band Meshuggah. Similarly, the track "Like a Pastime" was also influenced by Meshuggah and was conceived by accident when Wolfgang was attempting to explain what a polyrhythm was to his fiance; by the time he finished his attempts to demonstrate it to her, he realized he had created a basis for a new song. The song "Miles Above Me" was described by Wolfgang as his attempt at a "pop punk comfort song", with his guitar solo being inspired by the work of George Harrison.

== Release and promotion ==
In March 2023, the album's name Mammoth II, and release date, August 4, 2023, were announced. The album's first single, "Another Celebration at the End of the World", was released on the same day. In the same month, it was announced they had signed to the BMG record label for releasing the album. "Like a Pastime" was released as the second single.

== Reception ==
Professional ratings
Review scores
Source	Rating
AllMusic	3.5/5 stars
Blabbermouth.net	8/10
Classic Rock	4/5 stars
Distorted Sound	8/10
Kerrang!	3/5
Spill Magazine	3.5/5 stars

The album was generally well received by critics. Classic Rock praised the album as "scaling new peaks" and "better than Wolfgang's debut because it has more variety as well as better-quality songwriting". Ultimate Classic Rock praised the album's "starting-gun riffs, easily digestible lyrics and impassioned vocals" and concluded it was "a template for the future that doesn't disregard his past." Kerrang! praised its massive sound, noting it is "bigger than a stampeding herd of elephants. The next thing is always slightly bigger than the last very big thing". While the reviewer noted the album's constantly large sound sometimes dampened its impact, it still concluded that "Mammoth II remains, inarguably, a worthy follow-up to that equally muscular debut."

== Track listing ==
All tracks are written by Wolfgang Van Halen.

Mammoth II track listing
No.	Title	Length
1.	"Right?"	4:30
2.	"Like a Pastime"	3:45
3.	"Another Celebration at the End of the World"	4:35
4.	"Miles Above Me"	4:02
5.	"Take a Bow"	6:54
6.	"Optimist"	4:34
7.	"I'm Alright"	4:35
8.	"Erase Me"	4:12
9.	"Waiting"	4:23
10.	"Better Than You"	6:37
Total length:		48:07

== Personnel ==
Mammoth

- Wolfgang Van Halen – vocals, guitars, bass, drums, percussion, piano

Technical

- Michael Baskette – production, mixing, engineering
- Jef Moll – engineering, digital editing
- Josh Saldate – engineering assistance, additional engineering
- Patrick Bertinelli – wah operation (track 7)
- Brad Blackwood – mastering

Artwork

- Chuck Brueckmann – art design
- Patrick Bertinelli – art design
- John Brosio – cover art
- Travis Shinn – photography

== Charts ==
Chart performance for Mammoth II
Chart (2023)	Peak position
Austrian Albums (Ö3 Austria)	36
Belgian Albums (Ultratop Flanders)	186
Belgian Albums (Ultratop Wallonia)	181
French Albums (SNEP)	178
German Albums (Offizielle Top 100)	14
Scottish Albums (Official Charts)	9
Swiss Albums (Schweizer Hitparade)	4
UK Albums (Official Charts)	76
UK Independent Albums (Official Charts)	4
UK Rock & Metal Albums (Official Charts)	1
US Billboard 200	29
US Independent Albums (Billboard)	6
US Top Hard Rock Albums (Billboard)	1
US Top Rock Albums (Billboard)	3
