= The End (Mammoth album) =

Studio album by Mammoth
- Released: October 24, 2025
- Studio: 5150 (Los Angeles)
- Genre: Rock
- Length: 39:09
- Label: BMG
- Producer: Michael Baskette

Mammoth chronology
Mammoth II (2023)	The End (2025)

Singles from The End
- 1. "The End" Released: May 1, 2025; 2. "The Spell" Released: July 9, 2025; 3. "I Really Wanna" Released: September 10, 2025; 4. "Same Old Song" Released: October 24, 2025

The End is the third studio album by American rock band Mammoth. As with the band's previous albums, Mammoth WVH (2021) and Mammoth II (2023), all writing, vocals, and instrumentation were handled solely by Wolfgang Van Halen. The album was released through I Am the Sheriff and BMG Rights Management on October 24, 2025.

== Writing and recording ==
In an interview on KDVV/V100 radio in February 2024, Wolfgang confirmed that he had begun "working on some preliminary sort of" the third Mammoth album, with a working title of Mammoth III. All writing, vocals, and instrumentation—including guitar, bass, drums, and keyboards—were performed by Wolfgang. Recording took place at 5150 Studios in Studio City, Los Angeles, with Michael "Elvis" Baskette returning as producer. Van Halen noted a change in how he recorded his parts for the upcoming album:

In the past, I would use Logic Pro to sit there and type out a drum part with MIDI drums and then play guitar to it. This time, I was able to play guitar in the moment, run out, and play drums. It was way more fun to sit at the kit and perform what naturally came to me. Doing these parts back to back in real time was a game changer.

The process concluded by mid-2025, prior to the release of the lead single "The End" on May 1, 2025.

== Release and promotion ==
The first single "The End", was released on May 1, 2025. A second single, "The Spell", was released on July 9, 2025. On the same day, the band officially announced their third studio album, The End, scheduled for release on October 24, 2025. The album was released through I Am the Sheriff and BMG Rights Management. A third single, "I Really Wanna", was released on September 10, 2025. The fourth and final single "Same Old Song" was released on the album release date.

== Reception ==
Professional ratings
Review scores
Source	Rating
AllMusic	3.5/5 stars
Classic Rock	4/5 stars
Distorted Sound	7/10
Kerrang!	3/5
The Spill Magazine	3.5/5 stars

The album was generally well received by critics. MetalInsider called it "a masterpiece … pure rock and roll at its finest" and said Wolfgang "has out-done himself." Classic Rock said he "adds another compelling entry to a remarkable résumé." Moshville Times noted that while the title "may be ominous … it really sounds like Van Halen is just getting started," praising the growth and evolution displayed across the record. Kerrang! pointed to the album's strong delivery but mentioned that occasionally the songs "swim similar strokes" and that listeners might "wish he'd push the songs a bit further."

== Track listing ==
All tracks are written by Wolfgang Van Halen.

No.	Title	Length
1.	"One of a Kind"	5:28
2.	"The End"	3:33
3.	"Same Old Song"	4:06
4.	"The Spell"	3:29
5.	"I Really Wanna"	3:17
6.	"Happy"	4:08
7.	"Better Off"	3:26
8.	"Something New"	4:03
9.	"Selfish"	3:34
10.	"All in Good Time"	3:59

== Personnel ==
Mammoth

- Wolfgang Van Halen – vocals, guitars, bass, drums, percussion, piano

Technical

- Michael Baskette – production, mixing, engineering
- Jef Moll – engineering, digital editing
- Josh Saldate – engineering assistance, additional engineering
- Brad Blackwood – mastering
- Moon Patrol – cover artwork

== Charts ==
Chart performance for The End
Chart (2025)	Peak position
Australian Albums (ARIA)	96
Austrian Albums (Ö3 Austria)	45
Belgian Albums (Ultratop Wallonia)	175
French Physical Albums (SNEP)	49
French Rock & Metal Albums (SNEP)	18
German Albums (Offizielle Top 100)	91
Scottish Albums (Official Charts)	16
Swiss Albums (Schweizer Hitparade)	23
UK Albums Sales (OCC)	16
UK Independent Albums (Official Charts)	3
UK Rock & Metal Albums (Official Charts)	1
US Billboard 200	77
US Independent Albums (Billboard)	13
US Top Rock & Alternative Albums (Billboard)	17
