= Don't Back Down (disambiguation) =

"Don't Back Down" is a 1964 song by the Beach Boys.

Don't Back Down may also refer to:

- Don't Back Down (album), by The Queers, 1996
- Don't Back Down (Mammoth song), 2021
- "Don't Back Down", a song by Saint Etienne from the 2000 album Sound of Water
