= John Brosio =

American painter (born 1967)

- Born: 1967 (age 58–59); South Pasadena, California
- Education: University of California, Davis BFA (1991)
- Known for: Surrealist paintings of human relations with nature
- Notable work: Fatigue 2
- Style: Surrealism, oil painting
- Website: johnbrosio.com

John Brosio (born 1967) is an American painter whose works focuses on the relationships between humans and nature.

== Early life and education ==
Brosio was born in 1967, in South Pasadena, California. He studied art at Art Center College of Design under Richard Bunkall, Ray Turner, and David Limrite, and the University of California, Davis under Wayne Thiebaud, David Hollowell and Robert Arneson, and earned his Bachelor of Fine Arts degree in 1991.

After education, he worked as an intern at Lucasfilm Industrial Light & Magic company's Creature Shop in San Rafael from February to May 1990.

== Artistic style ==
His paintings largely deal with the small scale and relationship of humanity (represented in images of suburbia and brides for example) in contrast to the enormity of nature, such as against natural disasters like tornadoes, as well as cosmology, particularly the Holographic Principle, resulting in a surreal style. He first came to understand the relationship of humanity and nature through research and storm chasing through Kansas, Oklahoma, and Texas for three seasons. His work has been described as "anxious realism", with a focus on spectacle and the contrast between beauty and disaster.

Brosio's process involves utilizing references from things such as photographs and videos, creating thumbnails, and synthesizing the material into a final work. He utilizes oil paints in his paintings, and his palette is largely inspired by Wayne Thiebaud. Brosio uses bristle filbert brushes extensively on canvas, and also board. He uses Winsor & Newton paints, as well as paints from Old Holland. He coats his paintings with Galkyd Lite (from Gamblin) mixed with a cold wax medium often, or a Gamvar varnish.

== Works ==
Brosio's exhibitions include the solo show of his tornado paintings at the National Academy of Sciences Museum by the Cultural Programs of the National Academy of Sciences opening in October 2008 and closing in January 2009, as well as exhibitions at Sue Greenwood Fine Art gallery, Arcadia Contemporary galleries in California and New York, the John Natsoulas Gallery, the Castelli Art Space, the Thinkspace Gallery in Culver City, La Luz de Jesus gallery, the Clement C. Maxwell Library at Bridgewater State University, the Grunwald Gallery of Art at the Indiana University Bloomington, and the Laguna College of Art and Design (LCAD) Gallery. Brosio's artwork was additionally shown at the LA Art Show in 2016 through an Arcadia booth, where he sold two paintings to J.J. Abrams. His work has also been collected by Mike Mignola, Dave Grohl, and Norman Lear.

His artwork was featured on the cover of the 2021 album Mammoth WVH, named Fatigue 2, displaying a large crab terrorizing a city. The meaning of the subject of the painting generated discussion over Twitter. Fatigue 2 was also the cover image of "Songs of Profit, Songs of Loss: Private Equity, Wealth, and Inequality" by Daniel Scott Souleles.

He has served as an instructor of MFA art classes in painting and drawing and as a mentor for the MFA program at the Laguna College of Art and Design. He has also worked as a Visual Arts Chair at Idyllwild Arts Academy.
