= Mammoth (band) =

American rock band

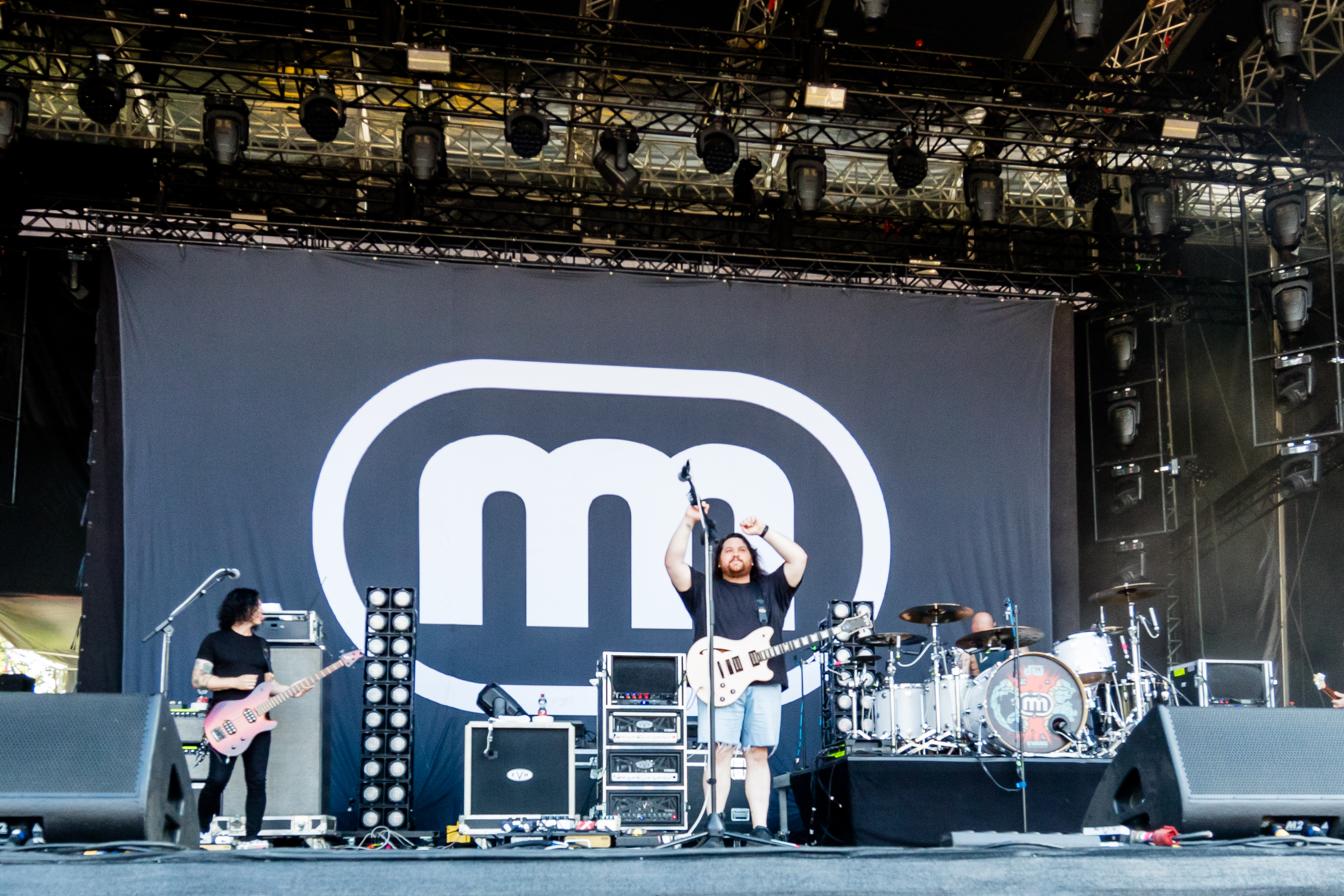
- Mammoth performing in Bolzano, South Tyrol in 2023

Background information
- Also known as: Mammoth WVH (2015–2025)
- Origin: Los Angeles, California, U.S.
- Genres: Hard rock; alternative rock
- Years active: 2015–present
- Labels: EX1; BMG
- Spinoff of: Van Halen
- Members: Wolfgang Van Halen
- Website: mammoth.band
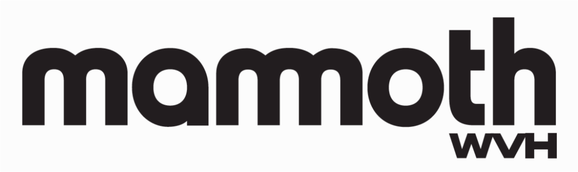

Mammoth (formerly known as Mammoth WVH until 2025) is an American rock band formed and fronted by Wolfgang Van Halen. The band name is a reference to one of the early names of Van Halen, in which he played from 2007 until 2020, alongside his father Eddie and uncle Alex. Wolfgang formed Mammoth initially as a solo project while he was still a part of Van Halen, but it became his full-time band after their disbandment in 2020 as a result of Eddie's death. To date, the band has released three albums: Mammoth WVH (2021), Mammoth II (2023), and The End (2025).

Mammoth is not to be confused with a United Kingdom-based band of the same name, which released the album Mammoth (1988).

== History ==
=== Formation and development ===
In a February 2015, Eddie announced that Wolfgang had started working on a solo project album. Recording took place at 5150 Studios and lasted until 2017. Release of the debut album was delayed, as Wolfgang chose to spend time with his father, whose health was declining. In June 2019, Wolfgang appeared as a guest on his mother Valerie Bertinelli's Food Network television show and announced that he had finished recording the album.

The first single "Distance" was released on November 16, 2020 as a tribute to his father, who died from a stroke on October 6, 2020 after years of battling throat cancer. Wolfgang later revealed that he began work on the song years prior as a coping strategy while his father's health was declining, stating that he knew there would be an eventual death of his beloved parent, bandmate, and best friend.

In February 2021, Wolfgang announced that Mammoth WVH's self-titled debut album would be released on June 11 of the same year. Later that month, Wolfgang stated that Mammoth WVH will move forward as his primary project, confirming that while it started off as a solo project, he considers the lineup a band. When asked why he recorded the entire album himself, he stated that he wanted to challenge himself and referenced inspiration from Dave Grohl's work as the sole member of the early years of Foo Fighters. Wolfgang initially named the band Mammoth WVH in reference to his father's band named Mammoth, which eventually evolved into Van Halen. Wolfgang said that the concept for the name came from a combination of inspirations. As a child, he grew up hearing the name of his father's former band believing, "That's the coolest name! When I grow up, I want to call my own band that." The younger Van Halen admired that Eddie had a multi-faceted role including serving as the original lead singer of Mammoth, and with his intentions to solely write, perform, and produce the album, he settled on the name. Upon settling on the title, he presented his idea to his father who responded to it with immense positivity and gave his blessing.

In June 2021, Wolfgang described the debut album as "personal" and "therapeutic", while acknowledging influence taken from his father's career. In developing the overall sound and style for the project, Wolfgang stated that while "I'll always be there to champion my father and his legacy...I definitely made a choice to not sound directly like Van Halen...I think that would be boring if I was a carbon copy of my dad."

=== 2021–2022: Mammoth WVH ===
The debut album Mammoth WVH was released on June 11, 2021. It was met with positive reviews from music critics. Music Talkers complimented that the album "has its own distinct sound...no two tracks feel the same." Sonic Perspectives declared that while the musician was initially met with doubt and criticism, the album "would make [his father] proud" and that fans should "expect to hear his name in this business for many years to come." While Riff Magazine criticized it as having calculated technique and lacking risk-taking, they praised his musical technicality and acknowledged that "he can go in just about any direction he wants, not only because of his last name, but because he really is that good." Consequence Heavy stated that while the diversity of songs creates a lack of cohesion, it is a "deeply personal and musically rewarding debut" with "virtuosic" musicianship.

Ultimate Classic Rock similarly praised the musical technicality, praising the "disciplined focus" and stating: "It's going to be fascinating to hear how Wolfgang's music evolves on future albums." Louder Sound gave the album 4/5 stars, calling it "high-tech, energetic, relentless and thrilling", while Metal Planet Music similarly praised the album by classifying it as a "tour de force." Wolfgang commented on the album and its success, saying: "I'm so thankful that my father was able to listen to, and enjoy the music I made. I'm really proud of the work I've done and nothing made me happier than seeing how proud he was that I was continuing the family legacy."

After the release of the debut album, Van Halen added Frank Sidoris, Jon Jourdan, Ronnie Ficarro, and Garrett Whitlock to the lineup in preparation for an upcoming tour and for future albums. In early 2022, the band embarked on a co-headlining tour with Dirty Honey called the Young Guns tour. The tour ended in April.

=== 2022–2025: Mammoth II and The End ===
In February 2022, Wolfgang stated that he hoped to begin recording a second album in 2022 following a tour in support of the debut album, citing that he has enough material to record, as well as leftover tracks from the debut album to look at. Wolfgang proceeded to begin work later that year on October 4. Mammoth II was released on digital formats on August 4, 2023. Additionally, the 10-song album was released on a limited edition pink cassette available on the band's website.

In an interview on KDVV/V100 radio in February 2024, Wolfgang confirmed that he had begun "working on some preliminary sort of" the third Mammoth WVH album, with a working title of Mammoth III. A new single, "The End", was released on May 1, 2025. The band also announced that they would commence a tour, titled The End Tour, where Myles Kennedy would feature as a supporting act. Coinciding with the release of the single "The End", the band's name was shortened to simply Mammoth. A second single, "The Spell", was released on July 9, 2025. On the same day, the band announced that their third studio album, The End, would be released on October 24, 2025.

=== 2026–present: Upcoming fourth studio album ===
In March 2026, Wolfgang announced that he has about "30 ideas that have just been, on and off, worked on" for the fourth Mammoth album. In regards to a specific timetable for the album, Wolfgang said, "We kind of have it penciled in for next year, around like Q2 [second quarter of 2027], that we'll probably get back in the studio for the next [Mammoth album]. So I think maybe by the end of the year I'll start to shift my focus in my head to being more open to creative thinking, so to speak."

== Band members ==
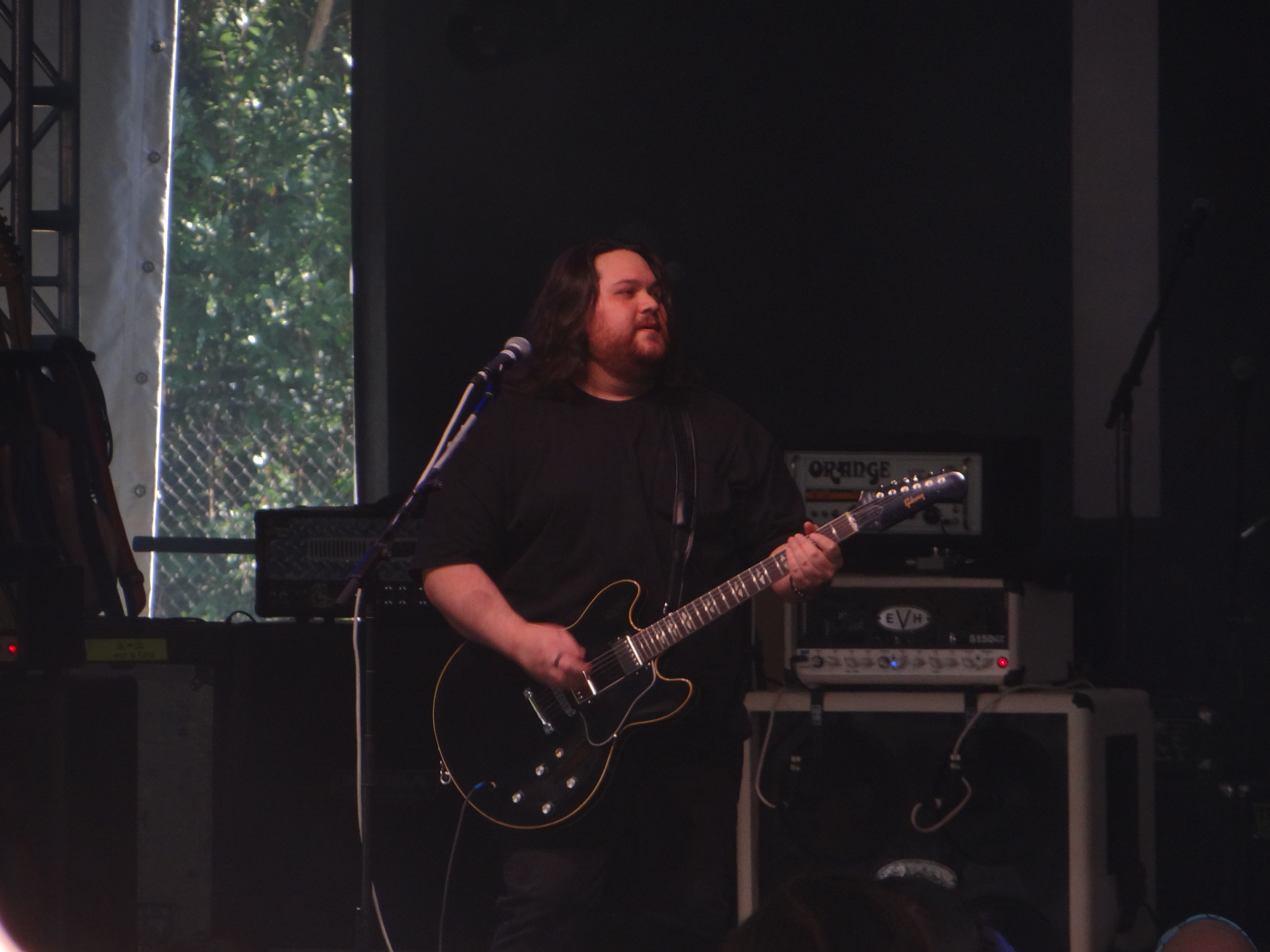
Wolfgang Van Halen performing with Mammoth in 2021

Official band

- Wolfgang Van Halen – vocals, guitars, keyboards, piano, bass guitar, drums, percussion

Additional touring lineup

- Frank Sidoris – guitars, backing vocals (2021–present)
- Jonathan Jourdan – guitars, backing vocals (2021–present)
- Ronnie Ficarro – bass, backing vocals (2021–present)
- Garrett Whitlock – drums, percussion (2021–2026)
- Nathan Bulla – drums, percussion (2026–present)

== Discography ==
=== Albums ===
List of studio albums, with selected chart positions
Title	Details	Peak chart positions										Sales
Title	Details	US	US Indie	US Hard Rock	US Rock	CAN	NLD	SCO	SWI	UK	UK Rock	Sales
Mammoth WVH	Released: June 11, 2021; Label: EX1; Formats: CD, LP, digital download	12	1	1	1	53	91	15	18	—	2	US: 68,000
Mammoth II	Released: August 4, 2023; Label: BMG; Formats: CD, LP, digital download	28	6	1	3	—	—	9	4	76	2	US: 58,000
The End	Released: October 24, 2025; Label: BMG; Formats: CD, LP, digital download	77	13	3	14	—	—	16	23	—	1	US: 29,000
"—" denotes a recording that did not chart or was not released in that territory.

=== Singles ===
Title	Year	Peak chart positions						Album
Title	Year	US Main.	US Rock	US Bub.	US Hard Digi.	US Hard Rock	CZE Rock	Album
"Distance"	2020	1	9	25	1	1	—	Mammoth WVH
"Don't Back Down"	2021	1	—	—	—	8	4	Mammoth WVH
"Epiphany"	2021	9	—	—	—	25	—	Mammoth WVH
"Another Celebration at the End of the World"	2023	7	—	—	18	—	—	Mammoth II
"I'm Alright"	2023	5	—	—	19	17	—	Mammoth II
"The End"	2025	1	—	—	4	25	14	The End
"The Spell"	2025	1	—	—	—	17	—	The End
"—" denotes a recording that did not chart or was not released in that territory.

=== Promotional singles ===
Title	Year	Peak chart positions		Album
Title	Year	US Hard Digi.	CZE Rock	Album
"You're to Blame"	2021	8	—	Mammoth WVH
"Think It Over"	2021	—	2	Mammoth WVH
"Feel"	2021	—	—	Mammoth WVH
"Mammoth"	2021	—	—	Mammoth WVH
"Talk & Walk"	2022	—	—	Mammoth WVH
"Goodbye"	2022	24	—	Mammoth WVH
"Like a Pastime"	2023	—	—	Mammoth II
"Take a Bow"	2023	—	—	Mammoth II
"I Really Wanna"	2025	—	—	The End
"—" denotes a recording that did not chart or was not released in that territory.

=== Music videos ===
Title	Year	Director	Album
"Distance"	2020	Chuck Brueckmann	Mammoth WVH
"Don't Back Down"	2021	Unknown	Mammoth WVH
"Epiphany"	2022	from live footage broadcast	Mammoth WVH
"Another Celebration at the End of the World"	2023	Gordy De St. Jeor	Mammoth II
"I'm Alright"	2023	Gordy De St. Jeor	Mammoth II
"The End"	2025	Robert Rodriguez and Greg Nicotero	The End
"The Spell"	2025	Gordy De St. Jeor	The End
"I Really Wanna"	2025	Unknown	The End
"Same Old Song"	2025	J.T. Ibanez	The End
"One of a Kind"	2026	from live footage broadcast	The End
