= Mammoth WVH (album) =

Studio album by Mammoth
- Released: June 11, 2021
- Recorded: 2013–2018; 2020
- Studio: 5150 Studios
- Genres: Hard rock; alternative rock
- Length: 58:08; 62:45 (Japanese pressing)
- Labels: EX1; Cleopatra
- Producer: Michael Baskette

Mammoth chronology
Mammoth WVH (2021)	Mammoth II (2023)

Singles from Mammoth WVH
- 1. "Distance" Released: November 16, 2020; 2. "You're to Blame" Released: February 11, 2021; 3. "Don't Back Down" / "Think It Over" Released: March 26, 2021; 4. "Feel" Released: April 23, 2021; 5. "Mammoth" Released: May 21, 2021; 6. "Epiphany" Released: December 7, 2021; 7. "Talk & Walk" Released: September 16, 2022; 8. "Goodbye" Released: November 11, 2022

Mammoth WVH (later retitled to Mammoth) is the debut studio album by American rock band Mammoth. The album was released on June 11, 2021, by EX1 Records, with distribution from Cleopatra Records.

== Background ==
The album's origins can be traced back to 2013 after Wolfgang Van Halen finished the A Different Kind of Truth Tour with Van Halen and began working on his own music. The album was completed in 2018.

For the opening track, "Mr. Ed", Wolfgang used the original Electro-Harmonix Micro-Synthesizer that his father, Eddie Van Halen, used for the 1981 Van Halen track "Sunday Afternoon in the Park".

Wolfgang used his father's original Frankenstrat guitar for the solos on "Mammoth" and "Feel".

The album cover features a painting by American painter John Brosio of a giant crab terrorizing a parking lot. When asked about the significance of the crab, Wolfgang Van Halen responded on Twitter with a screenshot of the synonyms of the word "mammoth", further stating that "We all know it takes being a Van Halen to understand that the word mammoth means 'big.'"

== Critical reception ==
Professional ratings
Aggregate scores
Source	Rating
Metacritic	79/100
Review scores
Source	Rating
AllMusic	3.5/5 stars
Blabbermouth.net	8/10
Classic Rock	4/5 stars
Consequence	B+
Distorted Sound	7/10
Kerrang!	3/5
Mojo	4/5 stars

Mammoth WVH received generally positive reviews from critics. At Metacritic, which assigns a normalized rating out of 100 to reviews from critics, the album received an average score of 79, which indicates "generally favorable reviews", based on four reviews.

It was elected by Loudwire as the 28th best rock/metal album of 2021. In 2021, the single "Distance" was nominated for Best Rock Song for the 64th Grammy Awards.

== Track listing ==
All tracks are written by Wolfgang Van Halen

Mammoth WVH track listing
No.	Title	Length
1.	"Mr. Ed"	3:44
2.	"Horribly Right"	3:39
3.	"Epiphany"	4:28
4.	"Don't Back Down"	3:45
5.	"Resolve"	5:03
6.	"You'll Be the One"	3:01
7.	"Mammoth"	4:30
8.	"Circles"	3:58
9.	"The Big Picture"	3:15
10.	"Think It Over"	3:55
11.	"You're to Blame"	4:06
12.	"Feel"	3:57
13.	"Stone"	6:33
14.	"Distance"	4:12
Total length:		58:08

Japanese bonus track
No.	Title	Length
15.	"Talk & Walk"	4:37
Total length:		62:45

Digital deluxe edition
No.	Title	Length
15.	"Talk & Walk"	4:35
16.	"As Long As You’re Not You"	3:41
17.	"Goodbye"	4:20
Total length:		70:00

== Personnel ==
Credits for Mammoth WVH adapted from liner notes.

Mammoth

- Wolfgang Van Halen – lead & backing vocals, lead & rhythm guitars, keyboards, piano, bass guitar, drums, percussion

Production

- Michael Baskette – production, mixing
- Josh Saldate – engineering
- Jef Moll – engineering, editing
- Brad Blackwood – mastering
- John Brosio – artwork
- Chuck Brueckmann – art direction, design
- Travis Shinn – photography

== Charts ==
=== Weekly charts ===
Weekly chart performance for Mammoth WVH
Chart (2021)	Peak position
Canadian Albums (Billboard)	53
Dutch Albums (Album Top 100)	91
Scottish Albums (Official Charts)	15
Swiss Albums (Schweizer Hitparade)	18
UK Rock & Metal Albums (Official Charts)	2
US Billboard 200	12
US Independent Albums (Billboard)	1
US Top Hard Rock Albums (Billboard)	1
US Top Rock Albums (Billboard)	1

=== Year-end charts ===
Year-end chart performance for Mammoth WVH
Chart (2021)	Position
US Top Rock Albums (Billboard)	86

=== Singles ===
Title	Peak chart positions
Title	US Main.
"Distance"	1
"Don't Back Down"	1
"Epiphany"	9
