= Peavey Predator =

Series of electric guitars

- Manufacturer: Peavey
- Period: 1985–present

Construction
- Body type: Solid
- Neck joint: Bolt-on
- Scale: 25.5 in (650 mm)

Woods
- Body: Basswood; Poplar
- Neck: Maple
- Fretboard: Rosewood

Hardware
- Bridge: Usually proprietary Tremolo; Hardtail
- Pickup: Usually 2 or 3 double-coils

Colors available
- Black, Gloss Black, Candy Apple Red, Metallic Garnet Red, Red, Cobalt Blue, Powder Blue, Metallic Topaz Blue, Metallic Dark Blue, White, Snowy White, Sunburst, Vintage Burst, Metallic Titanium, Metallic Gold, Metallic.

The Peavey Predator is a series of electric guitars made by Peavey Electronics. It has been made continuously since 1985. It is a double-cutaway guitar, with an extended top "horn" shape for balance. There are five models of the Peavey Predator, with different styles and makes of each.

== History ==
The Predator models were introduced in the mid-1980s, and the first model featured alder body and maple neck a dual humbucker, locking tremolo design. After several years, the design was modified to three single coils pickups instead, and later to the popular single/single/humbucker variant. In 2007, the NanoValve Stage Pack (MSR $400) was introduced with a Predator Plus EXP guitar, Nanovalve guitar amp, tuner, cable, gig bag, picks, strap, and a Learn to Play DVD.

== Models ==
There are five different models of the Peavey Predator, with different styles and makes. They were made in the United States, Korea, Vietnam, and Indonesia. While the United States manufacturing have now stopped they are still made in Korea and Vietnam.

=== Predator ===
Was made in the United States from 1985-1988 (Kahler Flyer tremolo) and from 1990-2000 (Power Bend tremolo).Alder body and maple neck.

=== Predator AX ===
Closely similar to Predator, but the AX has rosewood fingerboard with pearl dot inlay, 2 single coil/1 humbucker pickups, volume/tone control, 3-position mini switch, available in Black, Powder Blue, Red, Cream, or White finish, manufactured 1994-95. Also has upgraded sealed tuners and white pickup covers.

=== Predator DX ===
Is similar to Predator AX, except has maple fingerboard, also manufactured in 1994-95. Has the standard Predator open/covered tuners and pickups have exposed poles.

=== Predator Plus ===
A major extension of Predator series, the Predator Plus was a rather unique "fat strat" H-S-S styled after the Peavey Wolfgang model. It was equipped with a 25½” bolt on maple neck with dual expanding truss rod bolt, rosewood fretboard, short 3-on-a-side headstock, Schaller locking tuners, a Powerbend III chrome tremolo bridge and a nut width of 1 11/16". This model came with a solid poplar body and pearloid pickguard available in six colors: Black; Sunburst; Metallic Dark Blue; Titanium; Transparent Green; Transparent Red.

=== Predator Plus EXP ===
The Predator Plus EXP is composed of an offset double cutaway body, 22-fret rosewood fingerboard with dot inlay, two humbucker pickups, Floyd Rose licensed tremolo, black hardware, available in Black, Candy Apple Red, or Metallic Topaz Blue finish. Manufactured in 2003–present.

=== Predator Plus HB ===
Peavey builds the Predator Plus HB with dual humbucking pickups for raw power whether you're playing leads or rhythm. They also fit the Predator with the best bridge in the business—a Floyd Rose® double-locking tremolo. It's a world-class whammy bar that stays in tune and you rarely find it on guitars in this price range. Other features include 25-1/2 in. scale, body binding, and high quality sealed, die-cast tuning machines. Colors are available in Gloss Black, Cobalt Blue, Metallic Gold, Metallic Garnet Red, or Metallic. It was discontinued in 2002.

=== Predator Plus ST ===
The newest of the series the 'Predator Plus ST' is available in six colors; Gloss Black, Candy Apple Red, Topaz Blue, Transparent Purple, Transparent Amber and Transparent Black. It's made with 2 Peavey custom USA designed humbucking pickups, with a three way switch selector. The body is made of solid basswood, with a premium AAA quilt maple top on transparent finish versions, and binding. It has a maple bolt-on neck with 5 bolts and 25.5" scale length. The fret board is made from rosewood and there are 24-frets that are 2.7 mm wide × 1.1 mm tall and 4 mm white dots are inlaid on the frets.

== See also ==
- Peavey Electronics
- List of Peavey guitars
