= EVH Wolfgang =

Electric guitar

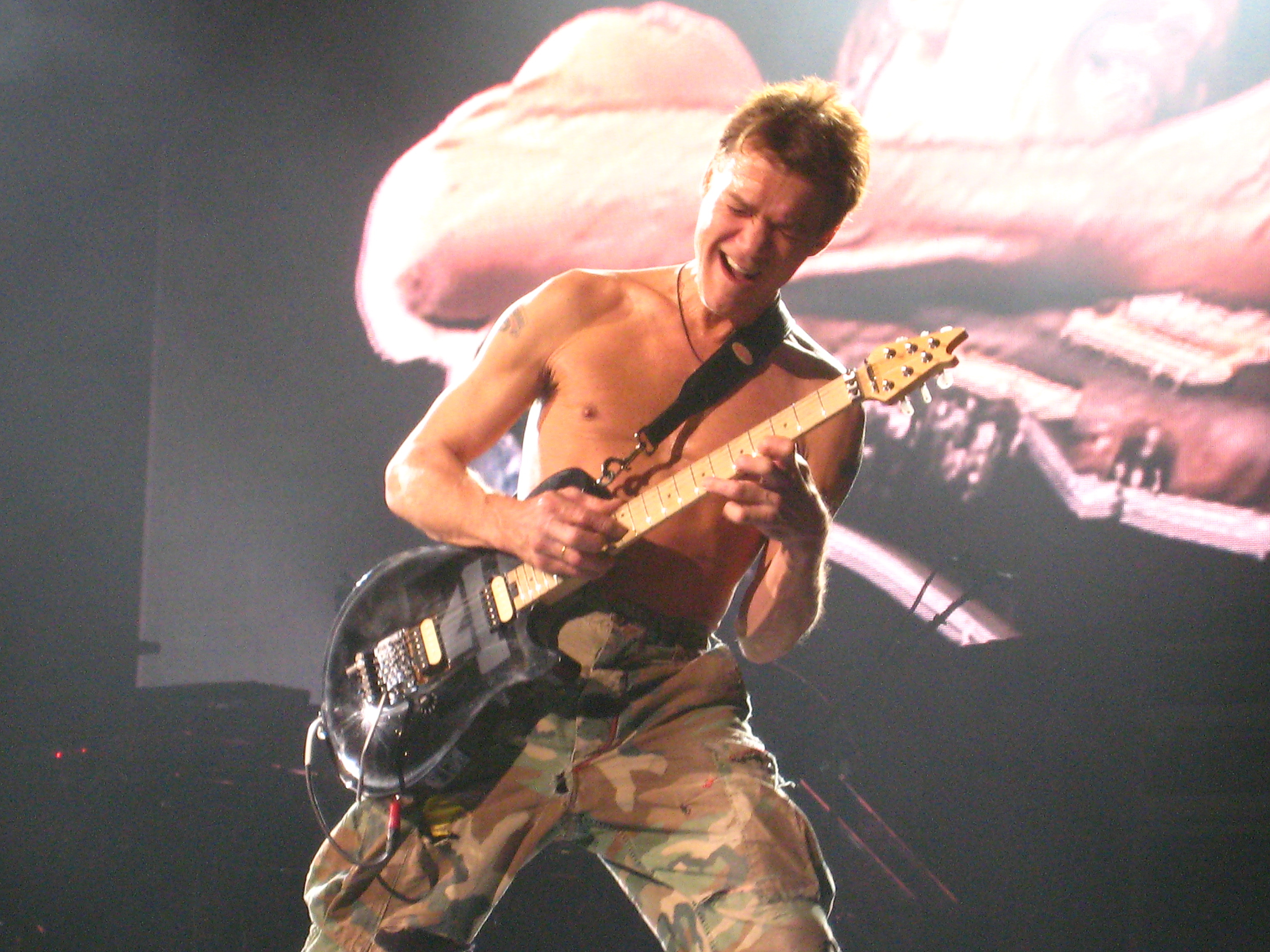
- Eddie Van Halen playing an EVH Wolfgang prototype in 2007
- Manufacturer: EVH
- Period: 2009-present

Construction
- Body type: Solid
- Neck joint: Bolt-on
- Scale: 25.5"

Woods
- Body: Basswood with Maple top
- Neck: Quartersawn Maple
- Fretboard: Maple or Ebony

Hardware
- Bridge: EVH Floyd Rose
- Pickup(s): Wolfgang bridge and neck humbuckers

The EVH Wolfgang is an electric guitar manufactured by Eddie Van Halen's company, EVH, which is owned by Fender Musical Instruments Corporation. The Wolfgang is named after Van Halen's son Wolfgang Van Halen.

== Background and design ==
After joining Fender in 2005, Eddie Van Halen set out to rebuild the Peavey EVH Wolfgang from the ground up. He teamed up with Fender Master Builder Chip Ellis in May 2006. Van Halen stated that this was his "last attempt" to design a guitar.

New features included stainless steel frets, a 12" – 16" compound radius, and custom Bourns potentiometers (low friction 500 kΩ for volume and high friction 250 kΩ for tone). The bridge is a signature model Floyd Rose designed by EVH and is exclusive to the Wolfgang. The bridge is made in South Korea with bent steel baseplates and no gaps between saddles. The Wolfgang pickups are made in-house at Fender; they were chosen after trying out 80 prototypes made by Seymour Duncan and DiMarzio. They have Alnico 2 magnets and are direct mounted to the body with two screws on each leg, with foam rubber underneath, which allows the top of the pickup to be adjusted parallel to the strings. The cavities inside the guitar are left unpainted to let the instrument breathe and age "like a Stradivarius". The fine tuners on the Floyd Rose bridge was Van Halen's idea during its development in the late 1970s and early 1980s, inspired by the fine tuners on violins and cellos.

== Models ==
=== EVH Wolfgang USA ===
The Wolfgang USA is the flagship model, manufactured in Corona, California. Released in 2009, it had a maple fingerboard and the only color options were Vintage White, Black, and Tobacco Burst. Ebony fingerboards were soon introduced, in 2011 tsunami hit Japan causing closure and in 2012 opened in China. but by 2015, ebony became the only option available. However, as of 2020, maple fingerboards are still available on the lefty version on the Vintage White model. A Wolfgang USA Edward Van Halen Signature model was released in 2017, with a new Alnico 3 Wolfgang neck pickup.

=== EVH Wolfgang Special ===
A flat top version, the Wolfgang Special, was introduced in 2010. It was made in Japan and had the same pickups as the USA model. The factory, Chushin Gakki in Matsumoto, Nagano, closed in late 2011. A re-imagined Wolfgang Special, made in Ensenada, Baja California, was introduced in 2014 with an arched top.

=== EVH Wolfgang WG Standard ===
The Wolfgang WG Standard series was introduced in 2014. It is made in Indonesia, and is the lowest priced Wolfgang model. It has a Floyd Rose Special bridge with zinc saddles instead of steel and a zinc sustain block instead of brass. Quilted Maple veneer tops with various bursts and fades are available as well as single matte color models. In 2020, the baked maple fingerboard was introduced to the Standard line.

=== Parts and accessories ===
Wolfgang USA bridge and neck pickups were available to buy, separate from the guitar. They have been discontinued for sale as of November 2026. On previous Van Halen signature guitars, the Music Man EVH (now called the Axis) and the Peavey Wolfgang, the custom pickups made for that guitar could not be bought separately. The Wolfgang's custom EVH Bourns pots are also available, as well as EVH strings, picks, and cable.

== Usage on Van Halen albums and tours ==
=== Van Halen 2007–2008 North American Tour ===
Prototypes of the Wolfgang were road tested by Van Halen on Van Halen's Van Halen 2007–2008 North American Tour. A Tobacco Burst Wolfgang and a black Wolfgang with a number 4 stenciled on the front were used in 2007. A Vintage White Wolfgang was used in 2008.

=== A Different Kind of Truth ===
Van Halen used an EVH Wolfgang Stealth with an ebony fingerboard for the majority of Van Halen's 2012 album A Different Kind of Truth. "As Is" features a Wolfgang with a D2H (Drop 2 Hell) tailpiece. The D2H is made from solid brass and can drop the low E string down two and a half steps or more. It has never made it on to a production model. The end of "As Is" features a Wolfgang with a Sustainer, as well as on the song "Honeybabysweetiedoll."

=== A Different Kind of Truth Tour ===
The Wolfgang Stealth was also used for the majority of the A Different Kind of Truth Tour. It has a kill switch and a titanium D-Tuna.

=== Tokyo Dome Live in Concert ===
Van Halen used a Wolfgang with an ebony fingerboard and a black and white stripe job on June 21, 2013, in Tokyo, the night that Tokyo Dome Live in Concert was recorded.

=== Van Halen 2015 North American Tour ===
Van Halen used a black Wolfgang with a relic'd Ivory top coat for the majority of the Van Halen 2015 North American Tour. Built by Chip Ellis, it has a fatter neck than the Stealth. Van Halen sanded down the back of the neck himself. A replica version was released afterwards, limited to 20 pieces. On the song "I'll Wait", Van Halen would sometimes play a Wolfgang WG Standard.

== Notable EVH Wolfgang users ==
- Edward Van Halen
- Wolfgang Van Halen
- Paul Sidoti, guitarist for Taylor Swift
- Jack White
- John Mayer
- Steve Stevens, guitarist for Billy Idol
