= Peavey EVH Wolfgang =

Peavey electric guitar model

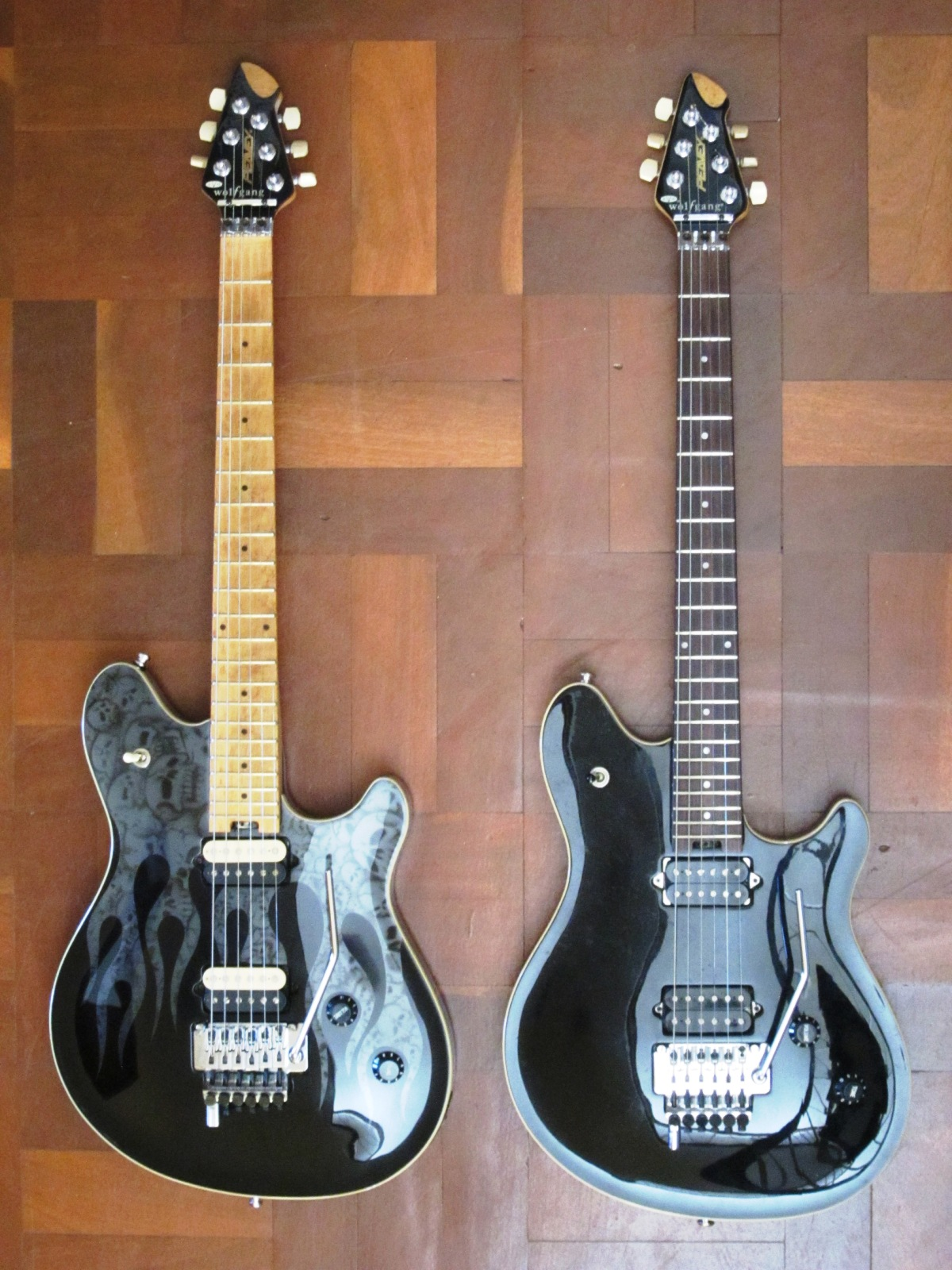
- Two custom models of the Peavey EVH Wolfgang.
- Manufacturer: Peavey
- Period: 1996–2004

The Peavey EVH Wolfgang is a series of solid-body electric guitars developed by Peavey Electronics with Eddie Van Halen and produced from 1996 to 2004. EVH refers to Eddie Van Halen; Wolfgang is the name of his son, Wolfgang Van Halen.

The range comprised the USA carved-top Wolfgang, the lower-priced flat-top Wolfgang Special introduced in 1998, a Custom Shop program launched in 2002, and the Korean-made Wolfgang Special QT, commonly called the Special EXP. Designer and luthier Jim DeCola worked closely with Van Halen on development and road testing.

== Development ==
Peavey had already collaborated with Van Halen on the 5150 amplifiers. As his Music Man agreement neared its end, his management approached Peavey about a signature guitar. Hartley Peavey contacted Sterling Ball before proceeding.

DeCola demonstrated Peavey's capabilities by copying Van Halen's Music Man, with a birdseye-maple neck, basswood body, figured-maple top and six-in-line Peavey headstock. Van Halen tested it during rehearsals for the Balance tour in Pensacola, Florida, and approved further development.

Hartley Peavey encouraged a design distinct from the Music Man, including a carved top. The asymmetrical body shape also provided better balance for the instrument.

Van Halen wanted a small 3+3 headstock. Early designs resembled a Gibson Flying V and a Washburn; DeCola ultimately developed the offset layout and scooped tip. The logo was developed with Pasadena's ArtCenter College of Design, with wood samples submitted to Van Halen.

Six prototypes were tested during the Balance tour, followed by approximately two dozen pilot instruments inspected at 5150 Studios. Development took about a year. Van Halen unveiled the guitar at the 1996 NAMM Show, and production began in mid-1996.

== Design and construction ==
=== Body and neck ===
The original Wolfgang has a bound, carved-top body in either solid basswood or basswood with a figured-maple top. The bolt-on neck and fingerboard are made of birdseye maple with an oil finish; the scale length is 25.5 inches, with 22 frets and a constant 15-inch fingerboard radius. A 10-to-16-inch compound radius was tested during development. The fingerboard is cut from the neck blank and glued back on, preserving grain continuity.

Two graphite/epoxy bars flank the truss rod. Hartley Peavey linked their use to the less predictable stability of birdseye maple; DeCola recalled that Van Halen preferred the reinforced prototypes. The frets are tall and narrow, approximately Dunlop 6105 size. A recessed truss-rod adjustment wheel preserves wood around the neck pocket and permits close neck-pickup placement. The body binding is cast epoxy.

=== Headstock, markings and controls ===
The original Wolfgang has a 10° angled, 3+3 headstock. The rear EVH signature is heat-branded because, according to DeCola, a decal or printed marking would be less durable on the oil-finished neck.

The carved-top model has volume and tone controls and a three-position Switchcraft selector: up selects the bridge pickup, centre both, and down the neck pickup. This orientation followed Van Halen's preference; the switch's upper-body location reduces accidental operation.

=== Pickups ===
The USA Wolfgang and Special use two custom-wound Peavey humbuckers, or dual-coil pickups, developed to Van Halen's specifications, mounted directly to the body and treated in a two-stage wax-dipping process. Initially made in-house, their winding and assembly were outsourced after spring 2000 without changing the approved specifications, according to DeCola.

Published measurements give approximately 16.22 kΩ DC resistance at the neck and 13.87 kΩ at the bridge, with different wire types accounting for the difference. Korean QT/EXP pickups follow the same basic specifications but are manufactured outside the United States.

=== Bridges ===
USA tremolo models use a Ping Well PT-505 double-locking bridge made to Peavey specifications under Floyd Rose licence. Its dimensions include 10.8 mm string spacing, approximately 54 mm overall spread, 74 mm stud spacing, 8 mm inserts, a 355 mm saddle radius and a 33 mm brass block.

The tremolo rests against the body rather than floating freely. Its D-Tuna switches the lowest string between E and D without retuning the others. DeCola contributed to its mechanical refinement. An earlier version was associated with THE WILLIE, a trademark application filed by E.L.V.H., Inc. in 1997 and abandoned in 1998.

The later fixed-bridge, or hardtail, version uses a recessed Tune-o-matic and stop tailpiece to maintain similar neck geometry. DeCola traced it to a piezo-equipped prototype and advocated production despite Van Halen's initial preference for tremolo models.

== Production ==
Production began at Leakesville, Mississippi, and moved to Meridian after the Leakesville plant closed in 2002.

A factory film documents the approximately 127,000-square-foot facility, humidity-controlled wood storage, CNC machining, finishing, pickup manufacture, assembly and final checks.

The former factory was demolished in March 2023.

== Models ==
=== Peavey EVH Wolfgang ===
The flagship USA model has a carved top, a sculpted neck joint and Schaller Mini M6 tuners with pearloid or ivory-coloured buttons. Figured-maple tops measure approximately 5/8 inch before carving.

Opaque and transparent finishes varied during production. Some black or ivory examples also used figured-maple tops unsuitable for transparent finishing. Collector and former Peavey dealer Geoff Knapp, mentioned in Peavey Guitars: The Authorized American History, documents the transition from quilted to flame maple as suitable quilted stock became harder to obtain.

=== Wolfgang Special USA ===
The lower-priced, flat-top Special appeared in 1998. It retained the USA Wolfgang's pickups, tremolo and electronics specifications, but used unfigured hard-rock maple, a straight headstock, standard die-cast tuners and a single volume control. According to DeCola, the savings came mainly from these differences in construction and equipment.

Later versions were also available with figured-maple tops approximately 1/4 inch thick and fixed bridges, in opaque and transparent finishes. Special Flame Top and Special ST variants were available from 2000, and rosewood fingerboards from 2001.

=== Price-list positioning and model range ===
Peavey's July 1996 list placed the four Wolfgang body/bridge configurations alone in its highest electric-guitar price tier, Level 3, at $100 increments. Other electric guitars occupied Level 1, with none in Level 2. By July 1999, the Special alone occupied Level 2. In autumn 2001, the number of listed Wolfgang variants fell from fourteen to seven because rosewood fingerboards were treated as options rather than separate models.

=== Custom Shop ===
The four-person Custom Shop operated from January 2002 to 2004, launching with twelve monthly guitar giveaways. Knapp records approximately 285 instruments in its first phase, including 92 customer orders, with the remainder mainly for the "Wolfgang Vault" and exhibitions. Approximately 130 orders and 70 other instruments followed in Meridian, bringing the estimated total to 500.

Customers configured a Wolfgang or Special using largely standard production components, as DeCola explained. Choices covered woods, inlays, bridge, hardware, finishes, graphics and matching headstocks.

Body woods included basswood, alder, ash and mahogany, with koa and korina on request. Tops were available in flame maple, quilted maple and koa; fingerboards in birdseye maple, rosewood and ebony. Inlays included dots, EVH Blocks, Tribal Flames, Skulls or none. Chrome, gold or black hardware and approximately thirty colours and graphics were offered. Specials could receive birdseye-maple necks.

=== Peavey EVH Wolfgang Special QT/EXP ===
Introduced in 2002 after approximately two years of development, the Korean-made International Series Special QT is also known as the EXP. It has a basswood body, quilted-maple top, faux binding, hard-rock maple neck, two humbuckers developed to Van Halen's specifications, one volume control and a licensed tremolo with D-Tuna. Finishes included Blue, Maroon, Amber and Sunburst.

The top consists of a maple layer approximately 3/16 inch thick, made from three or four pieces and covered with a quilted-maple veneer. The neck lacks graphite reinforcement and is approximately 1.2 mm wider at the 12th fret than the USA neck. It uses Grover Mini tuners and a Korean licensed Floyd Rose with squared saddles; no fixed-bridge version is documented.

Peavey's 2002 documentation describes an oil-finished neck, but the production instruments have a satin polyester finish. Early examples may lack the rear EVH signature because marking equipment arrived after production began.

=== Production variations and prototypes ===
The USA Wolfgang 7.5, also called the Wolfgang Junior or three-quarter-scale Wolfgang, had a 22¾-inch scale. Approximately ten prototypes were made and shown at NAMM in 2003; limited dealer interest prevented production. Experimental finishes, hardware combinations and individual prototypes are documented separately from the official range.

== Identification ==
=== Distinguishing features ===
The table below focuses on externally visible distinguishing features useful for visual identification.

| Feature | Wolfgang | Wolfgang Special | Wolfgang Special QT/EXP |
|---|---|---|---|
| Made in | USA | USA | Korea |
| Production years | 1996–2004 | 1998–2004 | 2002–2004 |
| Tuning machines | Schaller tuning machines with pearloid or cream buttons | Unbranded all-metal die-cast tuning machines (standard Peavey, not Schaller) | Grover all-metal tuning machines |
| Headstock | 10° angled | Straight | Straight |
| Front headstock lettering | PEAVEY + EVH + Wolfgang | PEAVEY + EVH + Wolfgang + SPECIAL positioned slightly farther outward | PEAVEY + EVH + Wolfgang + SPECIAL positioned slightly farther inward (closer to center) |
| Rear headstock markings | Incised, uninked serial number; heat-branded EVH signature and patent marking | Incised, uninked serial number; heat-branded EVH signature and patent marking | Surface-printed serial number, EVH signature, and patent marking |
| Neck | Birdseye maple, oil-finished | Hard-rock maple, oil-finished | Hard-rock maple, satin clear-coated |
| Fingerboard | Birdseye maple | Hard-rock maple | Hard-rock maple |
| Neck-joint recess | Recessed, stepped neck-joint area | No recessed body step | No recessed body step |
| Top | Arched top | Flat top | Flat top with visibly layered construction: three- or four-piece maple top with a thin quilted-maple veneer |
| Tone control | Yes | No | No |
| Bridge | Peavey/Floyd Rose licensed double-locking tremolo; saddles with angled inner sides; fixed-bridge version also available | Peavey/Floyd Rose licensed double-locking tremolo; saddles with angled inner sides; fixed-bridge version also available | Korean licensed Floyd Rose with squared saddles; no fixed-bridge version |

=== Collector terminology ===
Collector and seller terminology includes "1st year Wolfgang Quilt" for first-year quilted tops, "Wolfgang Standard" for opaque carved-top models, "Standard Deluxe" for flame-maple carved tops, and "Special Deluxe" for figured-maple flat tops. These descriptive labels should be distinguished from Peavey's model designations.

=== Serial numbers and production dating ===
USA-made Wolfgangs have eight-digit serial numbers beginning with 91; more rarely, USA guitars from the final phase of production have serial numbers beginning with 51, while serial numbers beginning with 1 have been documented on a very limited number of prototypes. There is no separate serial-number code for Custom Shop instruments.

On USA Wolfgangs, the serial number is stamped directly into the wood on the back of the headstock, between the tuning machines. On early examples, up to approximately mid-to-late 1998, the wording Pat. Pend. appears in place of the final patent number. Korean QT/EXP guitars instead use black-printed information on the back of the headstock and serial numbers beginning with 02, 03 or 04.

Production of the Peavey EVH Wolfgang began in 1996. Eddie Van Halen stated that he personally inspected the first 100 guitars, including number 69, which he gave to Jason Becker on 31 August of that year.

Serial numbers were assigned during production and dates at completion. According to Geoff Knapp, instruments already numbered but subjected to further checks, rework or temporary holds could bear later dates.

There is no official system or mathematical rule for determining the exact production date from the serial number. Original Peavey documentation or confirmation from Peavey support is required.

The annual ranges shown are indicative estimates based on observations of 120 Wolfgangs, derived by simply arranging their serial numbers and documented dates in order. They reflect the collected examples, do not establish definitive boundaries for the entire production run, and are not official data or ranges published by Peavey.

| Approximate period | Observed/inferred serial range |
|---|---|
| 1996 | 91000001–91000643 |
| 1997 | 91001193–91004613 |
| 1998 | 91004653–91013199 |
| 1999 | 91013828–91021113 |
| 2000 | 91022169–91023704 |
| 2001 | 91023989–91027023 |
| 2002 | 91027601–91028737 |
| 2003–2004 | 91029130 to the end of the 91 series |
| 2003–2004 | 51xxxxxx, late-production USA serial numbers |

== Later related models ==
Van Halen's partnership with Peavey ended in 2004.

=== Peavey HP Special ===
Shortly after the end of the Van Halen partnership, Peavey introduced the HP Special in 2005, produced in both USA and Asian versions. The initials HP refer to Hartley Peavey, although the project was originally intended to be named Carina. The HP Special retains several elements of the Wolfgang, including the basswood body, optional contoured maple top and bolt-on maple neck, but introduces a different headstock, a five-screw neck joint and additional pickup configurations, including H-S-H.

=== EVH Wolfgang ===
A new EVH Wolfgang family subsequently appeared under the EVH brand associated with Fender, with the new model introduced in 2009. The new guitar resembled the Peavey Wolfgang but represented a further development of the design based on Eddie Van Halen's preferences.

=== Peavey HP2 ===
Peavey announced the HP2 in July 2017 as a model closely related to the discontinued Peavey Wolfgang. The HP2 features neither the EVH/Wolfgang logos nor the D-Tuna. Manufactured in the United States, it combines newly manufactured components with parts left over from the Wolfgang era. It is fitted with a new licensed Floyd Rose and new pickups with push/pull coil-splitting, allowing one coil of each humbucker to be switched off using the volume and tone controls.

Production resumed in Europe, in the Czech Republic, in 2020, again with guitars lacking the EVH/Wolfgang logos and the D-Tuna. The first 800 or so guitars bear the inscription NOS on the back of the headstock, indicating the use of components or materials left over from the original Wolfgang production run. Early reports mention around 400 NOS models.

The guitars come with a rectangular tweed-style case and a certificate of authenticity. The bridge is a licensed Floyd Rose produced for Peavey; the pickups feature push/pull coil-splitting on the volume and tone controls. According to measurements taken, the pickups, manufactured in Korea, have a resistance of approximately 15 kΩ at the bridge and approximately 13 kΩ at the neck.

Subsequently, the HP2 range was expanded to include new finishes and materials, including the HP2 Poplar Burl RM, featuring a poplar burl top and a roasted maple neck rather than birdseye maple.
