= Don't Back Down (Mammoth song) =

2021 song by Mammoth

Single by Mammoth

from the album Mammoth WVH
- Released: March 26, 2021
- Genre: Hard rock
- Length: 3:45
- Label: EX1
- Songwriter: Wolfgang Van Halen
- Producer: Michael Baskette

Mammoth singles chronology
"You're to Blame" (2021)	"Don't Back Down" (2021)	"Feel" (2021)

Music video
- "Don't Back Down" on YouTube

"Don't Back Down" is a song by American rock band Mammoth. It was released on March 26, 2021, as a single from Wolfgang Van Halen's debut studio album, Mammoth WVH. The song topped the Billboard Mainstream Rock Airplay chart in September 2021.

== Recording and release ==
As with all tracks on the album, Wolfgang Van Halen performed all instruments on "Don't Back Down". The recording features a Foxx Tone Machine fuzz pedal, a Gibson ES-335, and a Fender Starcaster, which was played through an EVH 5150III head. It also features a phaser pick slide at the end of the track.

"Don't Back Down" was released on March 26, 2021, alongside the song "Think It Over", with both tracks made available for streaming. An official live video was released on June 4, 2021. The song was featured on the Madden NFL 26 soundtrack.

== Composition and style ==
Wolfgang described the song as having a shuffle feel and said its demo was "very Sabbath-y".

Metal Injection described the song as a "bluesy hard rock jam", while Classic Rock characterized its chorus as "glam-tinged". Guitar World described the song as a "fuzz-heavy riffer". Kerrang! described the song as featuring a "Royal Blood"-sized "dirty rock'n'roll riff". Loudwire described the song as featuring aggressive, fast-tempo rhythms, while Blabbermouth referred to it as "the anthemic single for rock radio" and said it catered to fans of the band's "harder sound".

== Music video ==
The music video is set at 5150 Studios and features multiple versions of Wolfgang, with four shown performing the song and two shown as producers. The video depicts him recording the song by himself, with Wolfgang performing all instrumental and vocal parts, and was filmed over two days.

== Track listing ==
All tracks are written by Wolfgang Van Halen.

"Don't Back Down" single
No.	Title	Length
1.	"Don't Back Down"	3:45
2.	"Think It Over"	3:55
3.	"You're to Blame"	4:06
4.	"Distance"	4:12
Total length:		15:59

== Chart performance ==
The song reached number one on the Billboard Mainstream Rock Airplay chart on September 11, 2021, making the band the first act since 2019 to send its first two entries on the chart to number one. Wolfgang said that the song reaching number one proved that the success of "Distance" was not a "fluke".

== Personnel ==
Credits adapted from Apple Music.

Mammoth

- Wolfgang Van Halen – vocals, guitar, drums, bass, piano, songwriter

Additional credits

- Michael Baskette – producer, mixing engineer
- Jeff Moll – editing engineer
- Josh Saldate – assistant engineer
- Brad Blackwood – mastering engineer

== Charts ==
=== Weekly charts ===
Weekly chart performance for "Don't Back Down"
Chart (2021)	Peak position
Czech Republic Rock (IFPI)	4
US Rock & Alternative Airplay (Billboard)	10
US Mainstream Rock Airplay (Billboard)	1

=== Year-end charts ===
Year-end chart performance for "Don't Back Down"
Chart (2021)	Position
US Rock & Alternative Airplay (Billboard)	42
US Mainstream Rock Airplay (Billboard)	2
