= Old Holland =

Company in the Netherlands, founded 1664

- Industry: Fine Art materials
- Founded: 1664; 362 years ago in The Hague
- Founder: Willem Roelofs
- Headquarters: Netherlands
- Area served: Worldwide
- Products: Oils, Acrylic Paint, watercolours, Pigments, Raw Materials, Auxiliaries, Ancient Pigments,
- Website: https://www.oldholland.com/

Old Holland is a company based in the Netherlands, that manufactures high-quality painting supplies. Founded in 1664, the company continues the heritage of Old Dutch Masters, making products that include: oil paint, watercolor paint, acrylic paint, auxiliaries, and pigments.

== History ==
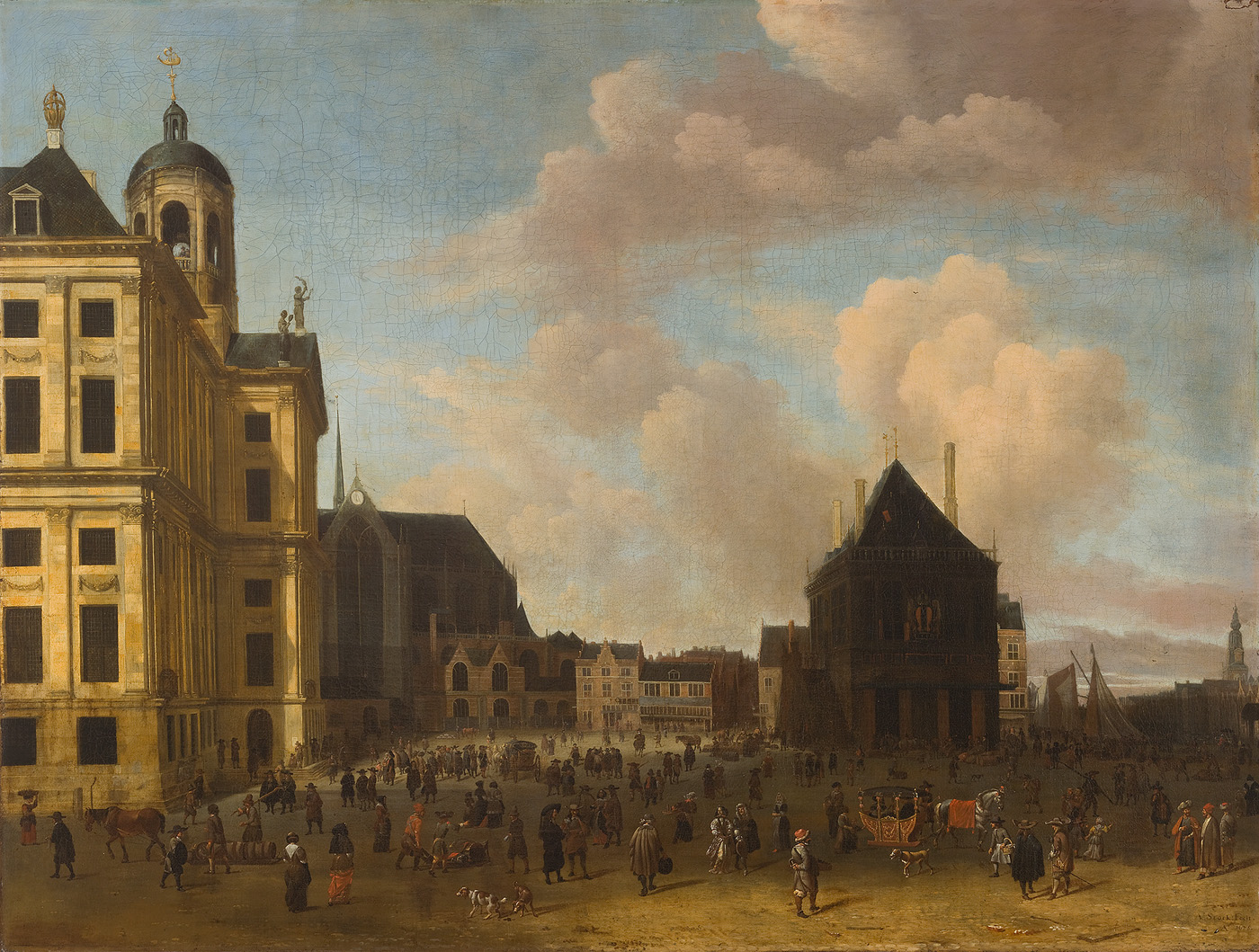
Dam Square in Amsterdam, Abraham Storck, 1675, Amsterdam Museum, Amsterdam, The Netherlands

The beginning of the 17th century saw the rise and development of Dutch painting and the start of the Dutch Golden Age of Painting, when the so-called Old Masters such as Rembrandt van Rijn, Johannes Vermeer, and Frans Hals flourished. As the demand for paintings grew, more painters and painter’s guilds emerged. As guilds began to grow, they also began to develop and transfer their knowledge about painting techniques and paint production, passing this knowledge down through generations of artists.

In the 1660s the members of the Guild of Saint Luke in The Hague set up the beginnings of the Royal Academy of Art, The Hague, and began to make their own paint according to the traditional recipes that had been kept since their establishment. During the 1700s, manufacturers of the painters’ confraternity began to experiment with new color mixtures. As the paint makers continued to improve their recipes, well-known artists of the time, most famously Rembrandt, continued to buy their colors from the confraternity.

In 1870, artist Willem Roelofs took over the manufacturing of paint out of the school, collecting the knowledge regarding pigments and paint recipes that the Guild of Saint Luke had passed on from generation to generation. Around 1905, Albert Roelofs succeeded his father at the head of the company. He officially named the company Oudt Hollandse Olieverwen Makerij and moved the company to Scheveningen, a district of The Hague. In many artists’ circles, ‘Scheveningen paint’ stands for quality.

In 1982 Theo de Beer took over the company, reviving and modernizing the production while keeping the same, historic ingredients. Old Holland then introduced a range of 168 oil colors, watercolor ranges, and acrylic paints.

In 2000, Edward de Beer took over the company, bringing it into modernity as his father had done in the generation before him. At the request of modern artists, Old Holland also adds a selection of metallic, iridescent, pearlescent and interference colors to the New Masters Classic Acrylics collection.

Old Holland’s factory switched to a sustainable, environmentally friendly production process in 2014, complete with energy-efficient LED lighting and solar panels. And in 2018 the company launches its new website and announces the founding of the Old Holland Academy.

== Products ==
Fine Art products made and distributed by Old Holland:

| Product | Range |
|---|---|
| Paint | 168 Oil Colors, 168 Acrylic Colors, 168 Watercolor Colors Ancient Pigments: Four ancient pigments for restoration work |
| Pigments & Raw Materials | Organic Pigments, Anorganic Pigments, Synthetic Organic Pigments, Dammar resin, Gum Arabic, and more. |
| Auxiliaries | Oil mediums, Oils, Oil solvents, Oil Varnishes, Acrylic Gels, Acrylic Varnishes, Acrylic Primers, Watercolor Mediums. |
| Ancient Pigments | Four ancient pigments for restoration work |

== Old Holland Academy ==
In 2018, Old Holland announced its Old Holland Academy, a collection of knowledge and information on colors mostly compiled from the teachings of Theo de Beer.

The company also announced its partnership with the online art, traditional art program Evolve Artist, which offers students custom mixed Old Holland Paints as a part of the program.
