= Kramer Baretta =

The Kramer Baretta, introduced in 1983, was a guitar manufactured by the Kramer guitar company, which was originally located in New Jersey.

== Features ==
The Baretta featured a Floyd Rose locking tremolo system and one Reverse Zebra Schaller Golden 50 humbucking pickup. The Baretta was discontinued in 1990 when the company went bankrupt, until Gibson bought them in the late 1990s. The most notable player of the Kramer Baretta is Van Halen guitarist Eddie Van Halen. The model was originally styled to be Van Halen's signature model, although he never endorsed it on stage. The banana headstock was copied from his "custom shark" Ibanez Destroyer. The single diagonal pickup was taken from his Frankenstrat guitar and was set diagonally to compensate for the wider string spacing of the tremolo bridge compared with the narrower pole spacing on the humbucker pickup. A reissue of the Baretta is currently available.
