= Distance (Mammoth song) =

2020 song by Mammoth

Single by Mammoth

from the album Mammoth WVH
- Released: November 16, 2020
- Genre: Hard rock ballad
- Length: 4:12
- Label: EX1
- Songwriter: Wolfgang Van Halen
- Producer: Michael Baskette

Mammoth singles chronology
"Distance" (2020)	"You're to Blame" (2021)

Music video
- "Distance" on YouTube

"Distance" is a song by American rock band Mammoth. It was released on November 16, 2020, as Wolfgang Van Halen's debut solo single from his album, Mammoth WVH. The song is a tribute to Wolfgang's father, Eddie Van Halen. It topped both the Billboard Mainstream Rock Airplay and Hot Hard Rock Songs charts. The song was nominated for Best Rock Song at the 64th Grammy Awards.

== Background and release ==
Wolfgang Van Halen wrote the song while his father was battling throat cancer, thinking about what life would be like without him. He described the song as highly personal, and said that anyone could relate to the idea of having a profound loss in their life. The song was recorded under the name Mammoth WVH, a reference to the original name used by the band Van Halen. Wolfgang said the idea for the song had existed for some time, and decided to finish and release the song, stating that he wanted to "put it out for dad". He was able to play the song for his father before his death, and it became one of Eddie's favorite tracks. Wolfgang said that his father cried when he first heard the song. He later said that Eddie "just understood it as a song about loss". He also said he "never intended "Distance" to be the very first piece of music people would hear from [him]". He added that "Distance" was not initially intended for inclusion on his debut album. The song was later included as a bonus track on his band's self-titled debut album. Wolfgang said it was added as a bonus track "due to the overwhelming response".

The song was released with an accompanying music video. Proceeds from the song were donated to The Mr. Holland's Opus Foundation.

== Composition and lyrics ==
Wolfgang Van Halen performed all instruments and vocals on the track. Guitar World described the song as a hard rock ballad. It has also been described as an "open letter" to his father, and includes lyrics such as "no matter what the distance is, I will be with you".

Wolfgang said the song's chorus was "almost like a mantra" when he thought about his father.

== Reception ==
Loudwire included "Distance" on its list of the best rock songs of 2020. In a review, Consequence called the song the album's strongest and most emotionally compelling track. In another review, Classic Rock described the track as more heartfelt, noting that its direct approach prevents it from becoming overly sentimental.

== Music video ==
The music video was compiled from home footage of Eddie Van Halen with his son, spanning from Wolfgang Van Halen's infancy to his performances with Van Halen, and concludes with a voicemail message from Eddie. Most of the footage was filmed by Wolfgang's mother, Valerie Bertinelli. The single's cover artwork was based on a scene from the video.

== Live performances ==
The song was performed live on Jimmy Kimmel Live! on February 11, 2021, as the project's first live performance. Wolfgang was joined by a backing band, in contrast to the studio recording where he performed all instruments. It marked the debut of Mammoth WVH's touring lineup, and it took place shortly after the announcement of the band's debut album. During the performance, portions of the song's music video were shown on a screen behind the band. The song was then performed on the television program Today, marking the band's second live appearance, this time in an acoustic arrangement. It was also performed acoustically during a March 30, 2022, show in Sayreville, New Jersey, with Wolfgang playing it solo due to the absence of touring guitarists.

== Track listing ==
"Distance" single
No.	Title	Length
1.	"Distance"	4:12

== Accolades ==
Year	Award	Results	Ref.
2022	Grammy Award for Best Rock Song	Nominated	

== Commercial performance ==
The song sold 9,000 downloads in the United States within its first two days of release. It was projected to debut in the top five of the Rock Digital Song Sales chart and to enter the Hot Rock & Alternative Songs chart. The song received early airplay on mainstream rock radio, drawing spins from multiple reporting stations shortly after release. In its first tracking week, the song recorded 826,000 U.S. streams, 13,000 downloads, and 1.6 million radio audience impressions.

== Chart performance ==
The song debuted at number one on the Billboard Hot Hard Rock Songs chart. It also debuted at number 9 on the Hot Rock & Alternative Songs chart, number 20 on the Mainstream Rock Airplay chart, number 32 on the Rock Airplay chart, and number 25 on the Bubbling Under Hot 100 chart. It reached numbers one and two on the Hard Rock Digital Song Sales and Rock Digital Song Sales charts, respectively, and number one on the Mainstream Rock Airplay chart dated February 27, 2021. On the Rock Airplay chart, it peaked at number 9. The song also reached number one on the Mediabase and BDS Active rock radio charts.

== Personnel ==
Credits adapted from Apple Music.

Mammoth

- Wolfgang Van Halen – vocals, guitar, drums, bass, piano, songwriter

Additional credits

- Michael Baskette – producer, mixing engineer
- Jeff Moll – editing engineer
- Josh Saldate – assistant engineer
- Brad Blackwood – mastering engineer

== Charts ==
=== Weekly charts ===
Weekly chart performance for "Distance"
Chart (2020–2021)	Peak position
US Bubbling Under Hot 100	25
US Rock & Alternative Airplay (Billboard)	9
US Hot Rock & Alternative Songs (Billboard)	9
US Mainstream Rock Airplay (Billboard)	1

=== Year-end charts ===
Year-end chart performance for "Distance"
Chart (2021)	Position
US Rock & Alternative Airplay (Billboard)	29
US Mainstream Rock Airplay (Billboard)	15
