= Frankenstein (guitar) =

Electric guitar created by Eddie Van Halen

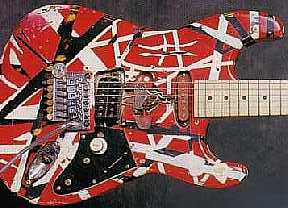
- Frankenstein
- Manufacturer: Eddie Van Halen
- Period: 1977–1981 (construction period)

Construction
- Body type: Solid
- Neck joint: Bolt-on

Woods
- Body: Northern Ash
- Neck: Maple
- Fretboard: Maple

Hardware
- Bridge: Floyd Rose
- Pickup: Gibson PAF

Colors available
- Red, black and white

Frankenstein, also known as "Frankie", is a guitar created by Eddie Van Halen.

Frankenstein was Van Halen's attempt to combine the sound of a classic Gibson guitar with the physical attributes and tremolo bar functionality of a Fender Stratocaster. An early version of a superstrat, the guitar was made from a Northern Ash Stratocaster body, with pickup routing which Van Halen modified to fit a Gibson PAF humbucking pickup in the bridge position. The guitar has a maple neck and fretboard, chrome hardware and was painted with a white over black design. This gave the appearance of a white guitar with black stripes. Later, red was painted over the original black and white. This now gave the appearance of a red guitar but was, in fact, just a third color sprayed over the original design. It has a standard six-string setup and a Floyd Rose tremolo.

In April 2019, the Metropolitan Museum of Art displayed Frankenstein as part of the "Play It Loud: Instruments of Rock and Roll" exhibit. A copy of Frankenstein is housed in the National Museum of American History, part of the Smithsonian Institution in Washington, D.C.

== Design ==
=== Body ===
Van Halen bought Frankenstein's northern ash body around January 1977 from Wayne Charvel, who primarily distributed Boogie Bodies necks and bodies and Schecter and Mighty Mite parts.

Van Halen said in early interviews that the body was made by Boogie Bodies, but it does not appear to match the specific shape and minutiae of Boogie Bodies Strat replacements of the era, but is a direct match for a Schecter pattern Strat body, which Charvel distributed. The body might have been one of about 100 ash bodies that Charvel himself made under the tutelage of Dave Schecter. These bodies, stamped "Charvel Azusa", are known as 'Azusa' pattern bodies and match Frankenstein exactly.

Van Halen bought the factory second body at a discount price of $50 due to a knot in the wood in the lower cutaway.

=== Neck ===
The guitar was initially assembled using parts from a 1961 Fender Stratocaster that Van Halen had been using for some time. The $80 Boogie Bodies neck, which was acquired around summer 1977, had jumbo frets and a brass nut with a large Strat headstock.

=== Bridge and pickup ===
Van Halen originally used the Fender tremolo system from his 1961 Fender Stratocaster, adding the Floyd Rose FRT-3 and FRT-4 later. He equipped the Frankenstrat with a PAF ("patent applied for") pickup removed from his Gibson ES-335, potting the pickup in paraffin wax to reduce microphonic feedback. He then screwed the pickup to the guitar in the bridge position, slightly offset from perpendicular to the strings, to compensate for the different string spacing between the Gibson's pickup and the Fender's bridge. This pickup was later replaced by an array of Seymour Duncan and Mighty Mite humbuckers.

=== Controls ===
Van Halen removed both tone-control potentiometers, wiring the pickups in a simple circuit largely due to his limited knowledge of electronics. He placed a knob marked "Tone" on the volume-control pot, then used a vinyl record that he had shaped into a pickguard to cover the controls. This pickguard was later replaced by a real, similarly shaped pickguard. Although it has five mounting holes (one drilled by Van Halen), it was installed with only three screws. A strip of double-sided masking tape was added near the pickguard, on which Van Halen placed a variety of picks. The simple circuit consisted of a single humbucking pick-up, an A500k potentiometer (the volume control) and a 1/4-inch output jack.

=== Finish ===
Van Halen painted the body with black lacquer shortly after purchasing it. The guitar was used in this state from approximately February 1977 until July 1977, when he put strips of masking tape around the body in a criss-crossing stripe pattern before repainting it white, creating the classic Frankenstrat paint scheme. Van Halen put a Gibson decal on the headstock, emphasizing the "cross-pollination" between Gibson and Fender. Charvel, just prior to the departure of its founder Wayne Charvel, produced what was essentially a professionally made copy of Frankenstein Van Halen built himself, but with a yellow and black motif and a body with the electronics loaded from the rear, as opposed to being suspended by a pickguard. This guitar, dubbed 'Bumblebee', was delivered to Van Halen in the Summer of 1978 and used live on the second European leg of Van Halen's 1978 world tour, as well as being photographed for the cover of the upcoming Van Halen II album. Frustrated by people beginning to copy his flair, Van Halen chose to refinish the original black and white Frankenstein with an additional layer of red paint at the end of March 1979. The guitar was hastily prepped with coarse sandpaper, causing additional damage to the original finish, masked with gaffer's tape and sprayed with a pearl white undercoat followed by a bright red top coat yielding the now unmistakable 3-color stripe scheme once the tape was removed. The white undercoat, which was part of the Schwinn bicycle lacquer's 2-part candy-color formula, caused the red paint to erode into a pinkish hue with time. The guitar was reassembled and used live on Van Halen's 1979 world tour.

== Upgrades ==
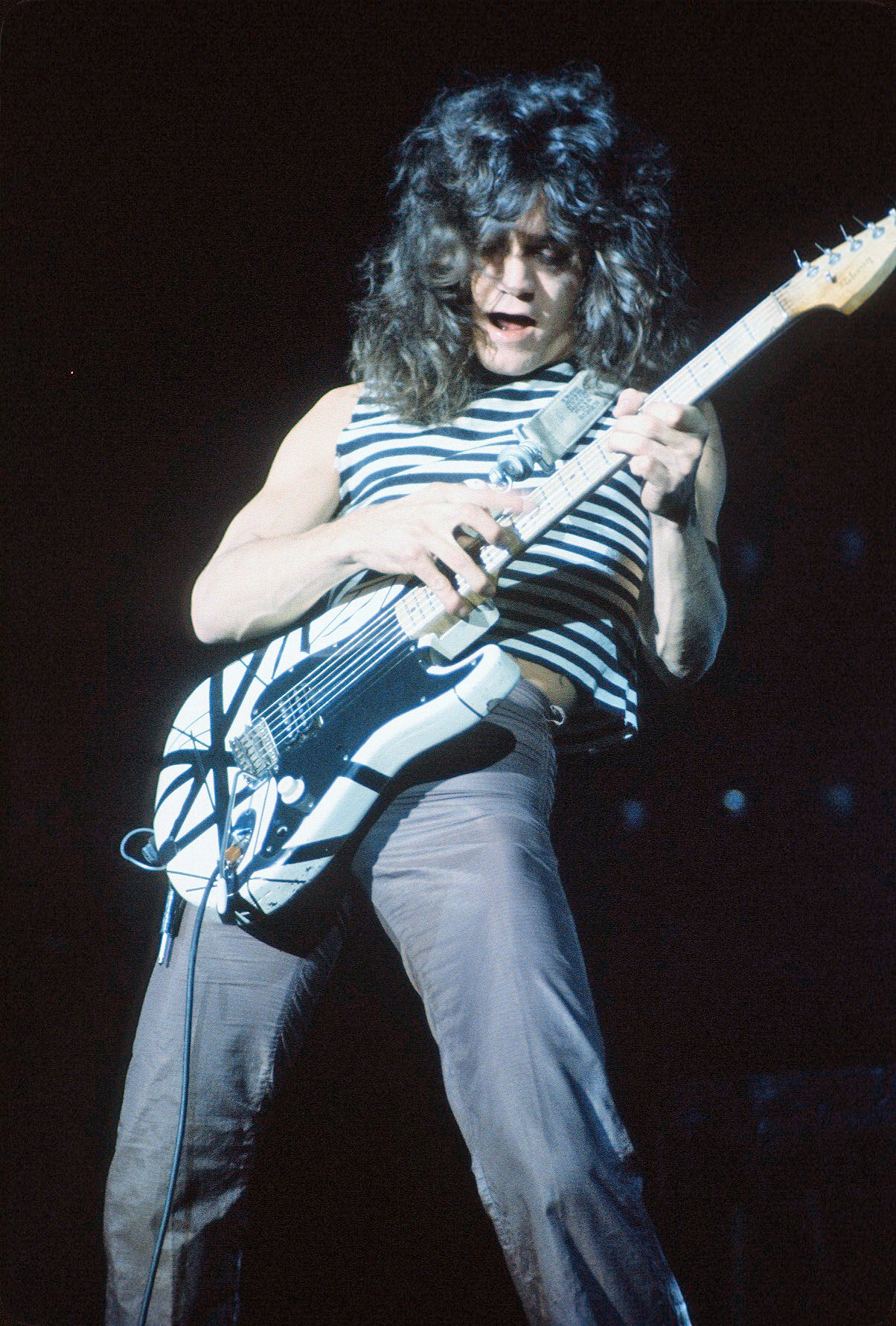
Van Halen playing an early configuration of Frankenstein. Here it has the paint seen on the cover of Van Halen's debut album, before it was repainted in red. While it still only has a single functional bridge humbucker, the holes for the other two pickups have been covered by a solid black pickguard. This pickguard would later be removed when the guitar was repainted and he would stuff non-functional electronics into the exposed pickup slots. This iteration also uses a Fender tremolo arm.

Frankenstein has gone through a number of necks over the years and its bridge has evolved from the 1961 Fender tremolo to original Floyd Rose bridges (with and without fine tuners). He added a 1971 quarter under the Floyd Rose so that the Floyd Rose bridge stayed flush with the body and Van Halen attached truck reflectors to the rear of the body so he could flip the guitar over to reflect stage lights onto the crowd. He installed large screw eyes instead of strap buttons, a foolproof method of securing the guitar to the strap.

During the late 1970s and early 1980s, many guitar companies tried to capitalize on Van Halen's popularity by manufacturing Frankenstein replicas. In 1979, he replaced the original black pickguard with a white pickguard and added a Mighty Mite single coil with a red phenolic bobbin on neck. He later replaced the white pickguard with a cut up black vinyl record, covered the back with aluminum foil and replaced the Gibson humbucker pickup with one from the "Bumblebee" guitar. In 1981, he replaced the vinyl record with a trimmed piece of a 3-ply black Fender pickguard to cover the control cavity. To confuse imitators, he screwed a three-way switch sideways into the middle position cavity, replaced the previous humbucker with a Seymour Duncan pickup and replaced the neck with the "Bumblebee" guitar's. In an interview, Eddie admitted the single-coil pickup and middle switch were not connected to anything.

== Variants ==
=== Kramer ===
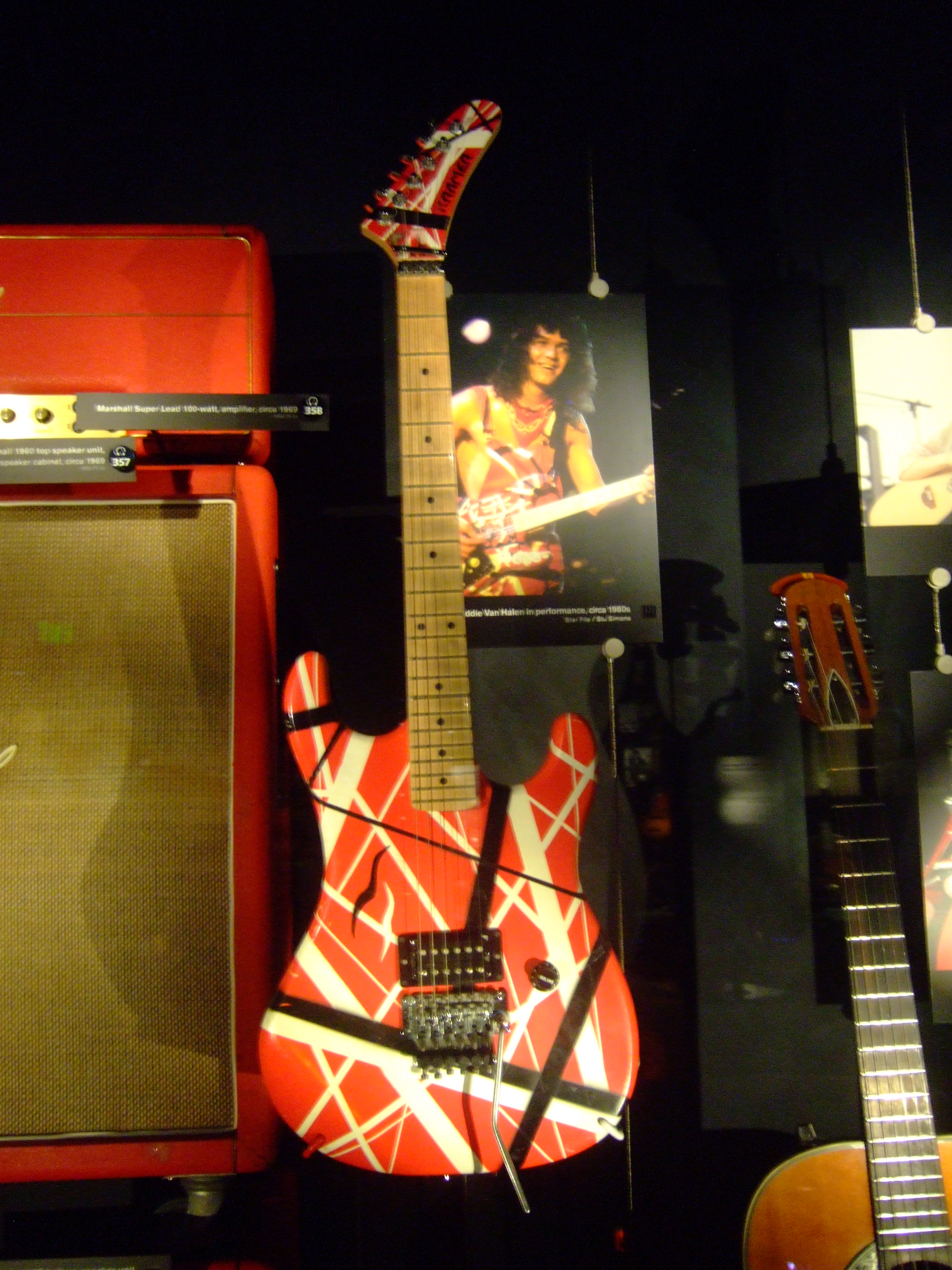
The Kramer guitar made by Eddie Van Halen

Kramer Guitars was the first company endorsed by Van Halen in 1983, when it built a Frankenstein replica and during this time he replaced the original Frankenstein neck with a prototype Kramer Pacer neck first seen during Van Halen's Hide Your Sheep Tour in January 1983. Later that year the Pacer neck was replaced with a Kramer "Banana" style neck first seen during Van Halen's performance at the US Festival and then in the "Jump" video. In 1984, he was given the "Hot for Teacher" guitar (seen in the song's video clip) and began appearing in Kramer advertisements. Paul Unkert, the "Guitar Guy" of UNK guitars, worked on Frankenstein and put his "Unk" stamp on it.

The best-known Kramer owned by Van Halen was the 5150, which he built in the Kramer factory. Although it was thought that the guitar was made from a Kramer Baretta body, it had a prototype Pacer body. The guitar, used from the 1984 tour through the OU812 tour, was last used to record "Judgement Day" for the album For Unlawful Carnal Knowledge (1991). Although the 5150 reappeared on the 2004 reunion tour with Sammy Hagar, the guitar upgraded with a Charvel neck and EVH Wolfgang humbucker, it was subsequently retired.

A number of other Kramers were also built and used by Van Halen during this time (most notably the 1984 Kramer), although most were simply striped designs without other markings. These guitars were primarily backups for the 5150 on tours and were retired at the same time. Some were given away or awarded in contests.

=== Charvel hybrid VH2 ===
The second Frankenstein, appearing on the Van Halen II LP and tour, was a 1979 Charvel hybrid VH2 "Bumblebee" black-and-yellow striped guitar. Anecdotally it was buried with Dimebag Darrell of Pantera in a Kiss Kasket, who had asked for a Charvel Art Series replica before they were released; Van Halen was said to have presented the original guitar at his funeral.

=== Ibanez Destroyer ===
This guitar was a 1976 Ibanez Destroyer made from ash wood. The wood is often mistaken for korina because of the finished appearance of Ibanez model No. 2459.

Van Halen later removed a large chunk of the wood with a hacksaw, giving it an open-jaws shape. It was nicknamed the "Shark" because the chunk he cut out was serrated, resembling shark teeth. This guitar was used in the videos for "Runnin' with the Devil" and "You Really Got Me".

The removal of the wood however destroyed the guitar's sound and he retired it. To record "Women and Children First", Van Halen borrowed a Destroyer from the then-unknown musician Chris Holmes.

=== Fender-Charvel ===
Charvel introduced a signature-model Eddie Van Halen guitar, the Charvel EVH Art Series Guitar equipped with a single custom-wound pickup and a Floyd Rose locking tremolo, in three colors: white with black stripes, black with yellow stripes and red with black-and-white stripes. The guitars have a neck profile similar to the original Frankenstein.

Three hundred replicas of the red-and-black-and-white-striped Frankenstein were offered by Van Halen's EVH brand for $25,000 each. About 180 were sold in the United States and the remainder overseas. In 2018, Fender-EVH added the '78 Eruption model, followed by the 2019 '79 Bumblebee replica. All three guitars are meticulously recreated to include parts as close to the original as possible. Van Halen himself stated that the red-black-white Frankenstein replicas feel and sound better than the original guitar built in the 1970s.

=== Guitar Hero: Van Halen ===
Frankenstein's paintjob was used in the box art for Guitar Hero: Van Halen. It also appears a number of times in the game, including transitions at the end of songs; the stripes appear one by one in quick succession and are then removed.

=== 2012 tour ===
For the band's 2012 tour, Van Halen used a variant of Frankenstein with the black-and-white capped-bridge pickup from his Wolfgang models, a maple Wolfgang neck with a black headstock and a Wolfgang-style volume knob, this guitar is a replica of his original Frankenstein.

=== EVH ===
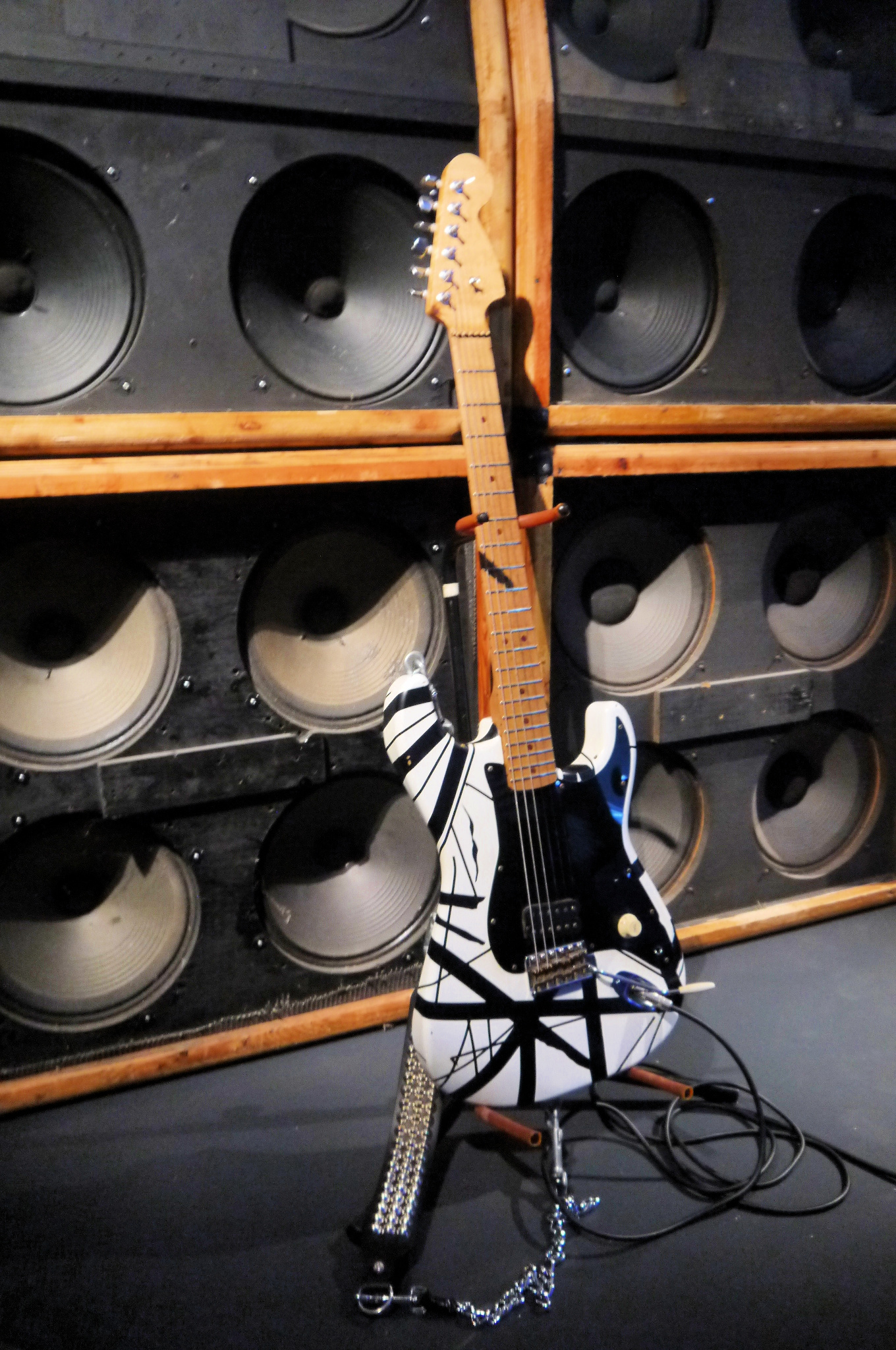
A 2018 replica of Frankenstein in its original "Eruption '78" configuration.

In 2013 Van Halen's brand, EVH, released a line of Fender USA-manufactured replicas based on previous Frankensteins. There are three, based on the Charvel "Bumblebee", the original pick-guarded Frankenstein and the red, white and black Frankenstein, with hardware similar to that of the EVH Wolfgangs.

Capitalising on these replica guitars, EVH and Fender later released a more budget-friendly Frankenstein replica (named "Franky") under the Striped Series moniker, which are manufactured in Fender's Ensenada, Mexico facility. EVH also sells a Frankenstein replica pickup, which they claim was wired to the same specs as Van Halen's original PAF.

== See also ==
- List of guitars
