= Kramer Pacer =

The Kramer Pacer is a guitar series made by Kramer Guitars from the beginning of the Kramer wooden neck period to the company's bankruptcy in 1990.

== Types ==
The Pacer Imperial, (the very first) Special, Standard and Custom were debuted in 1981. The Pacer Imperial had two humbuckers and was made from 1981 to 1989. The Pacer Special had one humbucker and was made from 1981 to 1985. The Pacer Custom had two hums and was made between 1981 and 82. The Pacer Standard had 1 hum and was also made from 1981 to 1982. The Pacer Carrera had two black hums and was made from 1982 to 1986. "The Pacer" had three single-coil pickups and was made from 1982 to 1985. The Pacer Deluxe had one hum and two single coils. It was made between 1983 and 1987. The Pacer Custom I had a slanted hum and two single coils. It was made between 1986 and 1989. The Pacer Custom II had one hum and two single coils. It was made between 1986 and 1989.

In 2010, Kramer released the Kramer Pacer Vintage, a H-H guitar with a locking tremolo. It is available in Pearl White and Candy Red.In 2015, Kramer put out a Bengal Tiger finish on the face of an orange guitar body. The red version is discontinued. The white and Bengal finishes continue as part of Kramer's Classic series. Currently in 2025, The Pacer is available as Deluxe, Carrera and Classic models.

== Parts ==
=== Headstocks ===
The headstocks of Pacers, like most Kramer guitars, went through a series of changes. From 1981 to 1982, Pacers had headstocks that were almost identical to that of a Fender Stratocaster. When Fender threatened to sue, they changed to a head known as the "classic" head. The classic head was like the Strat head but without the ball shape at the top. This was made from 1982–1984 and is often referred to as the "chicken" or "beak" headstock. In 1984, Kramer changed to the banana head or hockey-stick head. Later, the headstock took on a "pointy" profile, similar to that of the competitors of the day. These were made until 1990.

=== Tremolos ===
The first tremolos were the ESP Guitars Flicker tremolos or Rockinger tremolos. By 1984, Floyd Rose tremolos were used.

== Notable users ==
- George Lynch
- Joe Satriani
- Toadies
- Jeff LaBar
- Eddie Van Halen
- Satchel
- Mick Mars
- David Chastain
- Michael Romeo
- Jorge Martínez (of Ilegales)
