= Wolfgang Van Halen =

American musician (born 1991)

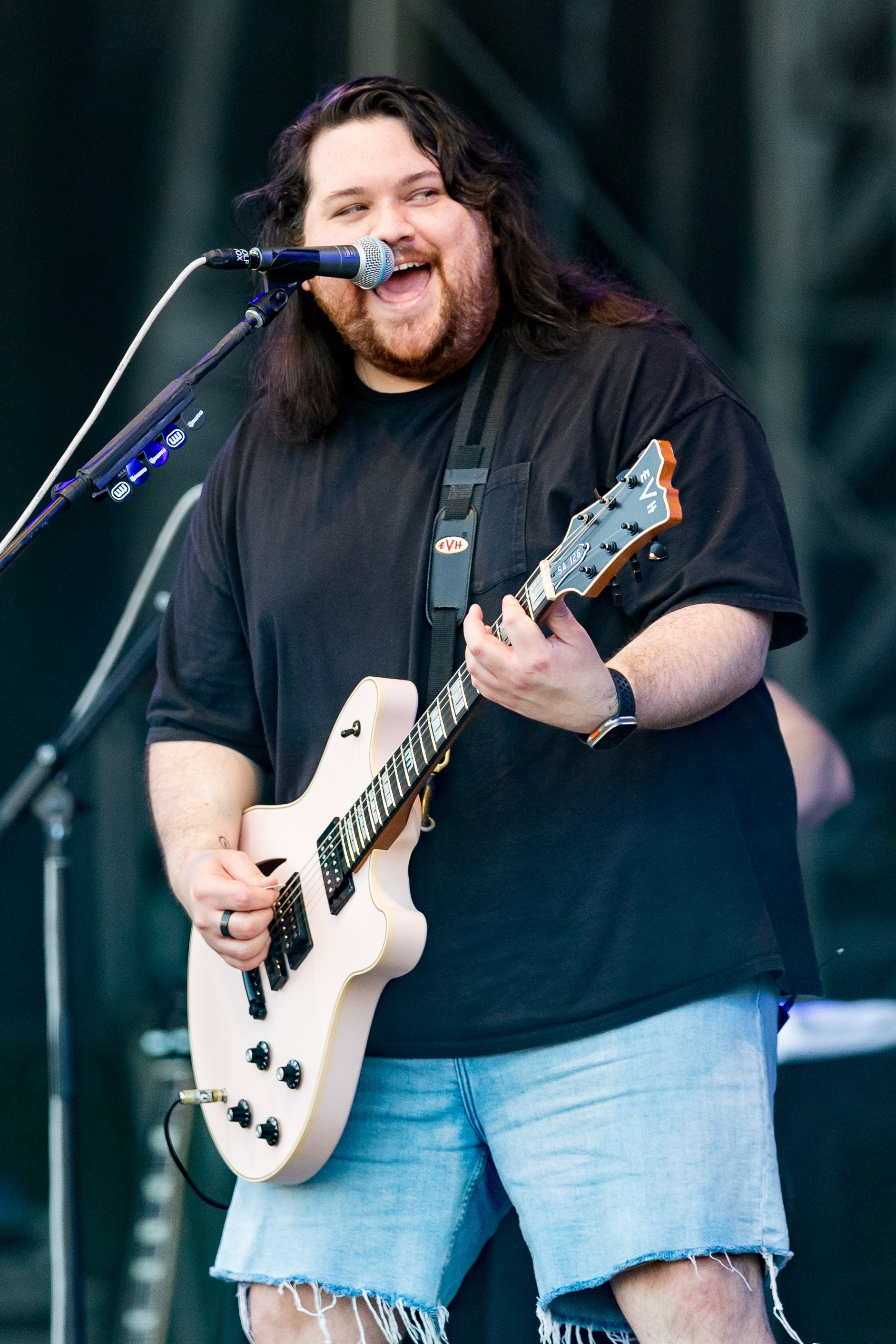
- Van Halen in 2023
- Born: Wolfgang William Van Halen; March 16, 1991 (age 35); Santa Monica, California, U.S.
- Other names: Wolfie; Wolf
- Occupations: Musician; singer; songwriter
- Years active: 2004–present
- Spouse: Andraia Allsop (m. 2023)
- Parents: Valerie Bertinelli; Eddie Van Halen
- Relatives: Alex Van Halen (uncle)
- Musical career
- Genres: Hard rock; alternative rock; heavy metal
- Instruments: Guitar; bass; vocals; keyboards; drums
- Member of: Mammoth
- Formerly of: Van Halen; Tremonti
- Website: mammothwvh.com

Wolfgang William Van Halen (/væn ˈheɪlən/ van HAY-lən, Dutch: [ˈʋɔl(ə)fxɑŋ ˈʋɪlijɑɱ vɑn ˈɦaːlə(n)], born March 16, 1991) is an American musician, singer, and songwriter. The son of actress Valerie Bertinelli and guitarist Eddie Van Halen, he performed alongside his father and his uncle Alex as the bassist for Van Halen from 2007 to 2020. He also performed with the heavy metal band Tremonti from 2012 to 2016. After his father died in 2020, which led to the disbanding of Van Halen, he began to focus on his solo project Mammoth, in which he performs all instruments and vocals. His debut album Mammoth WVH was released in 2021, and his second album Mammoth II was released in 2023.

== Early life ==
Wolfgang William Van Halen was born on March 16, 1991, in Santa Monica, California to rock musician Eddie Van Halen and actress Valerie Bertinelli. He is of Dutch, Indonesian, English, and Italian descent.

Wolfgang started his musical career as a drummer. He often watched his father rehearse, and at times would try to play his uncle Alex's drum kit, whereupon the latter would give him a few lessons. Wolfgang started playing drums at the age of nine, being mostly self-taught with only few lessons from his uncle, and got his first drum set from his father as a present for his tenth birthday. Some time later he moved on to guitar and bass. He can also play keyboards and "figure things out by ear". In 2006, when Wolfgang was 15 years old, his father talked on The Howard Stern Show about his son's musical talent, stating: "Wait 'til you hear this kid play bass, guitar and drums. He can do anything I do on guitar...the name 'Van Halen', the family legacy is gonna go on way after I'm gone 'cause this kid is just a natural."

Wolfgang later began actively participating in Van Halen, the band. He also made guest appearances during some dates of Van Halen's 2004 tour, appearing during his father's extended guitar solo spot and playing with him the instrumental "316" (from the album For Unlawful Carnal Knowledge), which refers to his birthday.

For a 13-year period ending in 2004, Eddie Van Halen collaborated with Peavey on a line of guitars, the Wolfgang series, named after his son. In 2008, his father named a custom guitar after him, the EVH Wolfgang.

== Career ==
=== Van Halen ===
In late 2006, in an interview with Guitar World, Eddie Van Halen confirmed that his son would replace Michael Anthony as Van Halen's bassist. Wolfgang first toured with Van Halen in his new capacity in 2007. Eddie took Wolfgang out of school for the tour, with Wolfgang missing 11th grade, but he put plans for a new album on hold so that Wolfgang could graduate. In August 2010, Van Halen announced that they would record a new album, with Wolfgang playing bass.

In early 2008, Van Halen appeared on the cover of the April issue of Guitar World with his father, in the magazine's first father-son issue.

Van Halen recorded his only studio album with Van Halen, A Different Kind of Truth, in 2011. The album was released on February 7, 2012.

Van Halen appears as the bassist for Van Halen in Guitar Hero: Van Halen, replacing Michael Anthony even in the band's past incarnation.

Van Halen remained in Van Halen until 2020, when the band disbanded following his father's death.

=== Tremonti ===
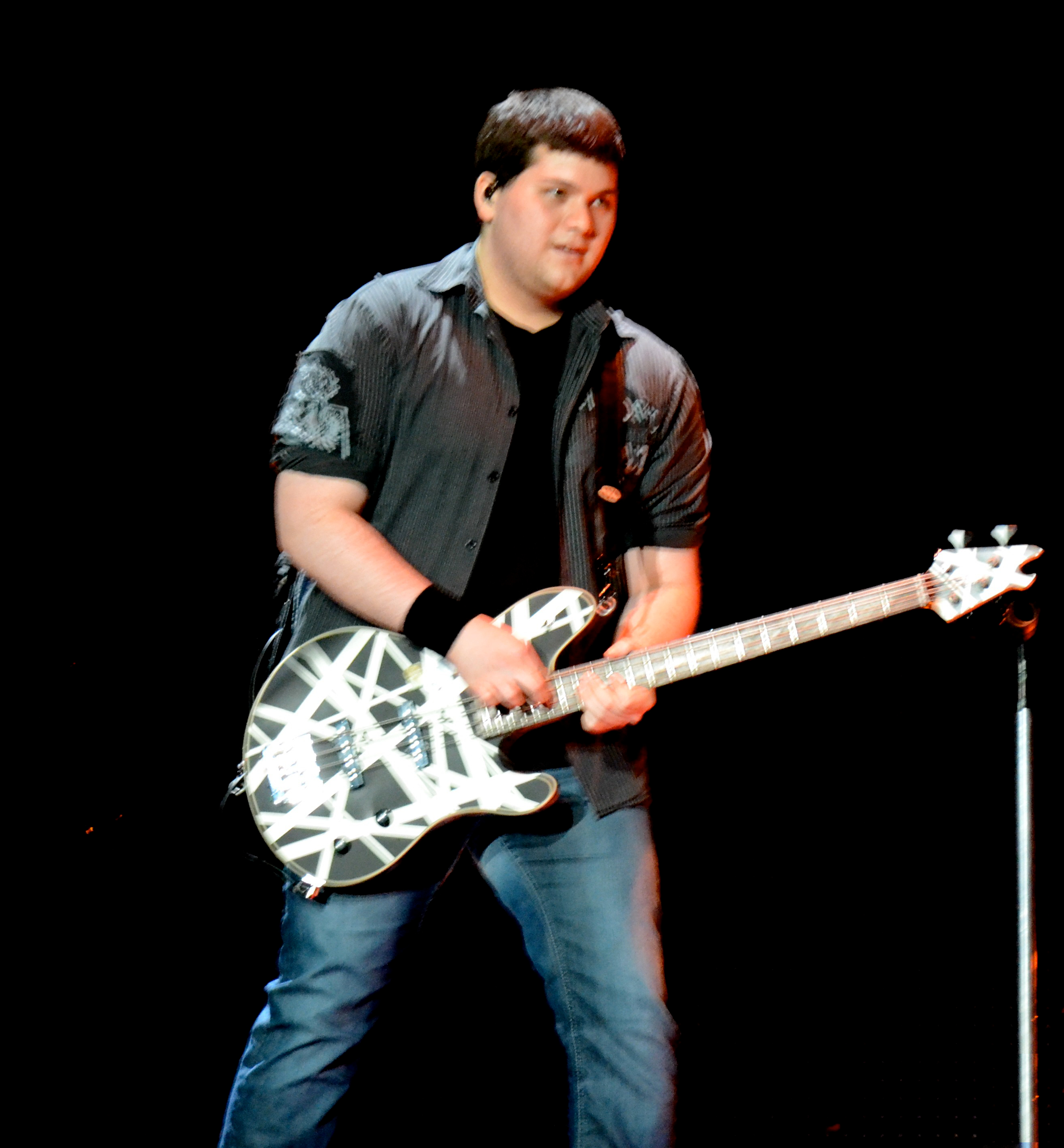
Van Halen performing in 2012

On September 10, 2012, Alter Bridge and Creed guitarist Mark Tremonti announced that Van Halen would be filling in for Brian Marshall as bassist for the first tour of Tremonti's eponymous band. Tremonti's first album, All I Was, was released on July 17 of that year. Wolfgang became an official member of Tremonti in 2013, replacing previous bassist Brian Marshall. He appears on the band's 2015 studio album Cauterize and its 2016 follow-up Dust.

=== Clint Lowery ===
Sevendust guitarist Clint Lowery revealed in a June 2019 tweet on Twitter that Van Halen would play on his solo debut. "[Wolfgang] will be playing drums, maybe some bass," he says. "I'll do the rest. Just not good enough on the kit myself to pull it off in [the] studio."

=== Mammoth ===
In 2021, Van Halen released his debut album Mammoth WVH under the same name. The LP showcased his talents as a songwriter and musician with Van Halen writing every song and playing every instrument on the studio album. After the album's release, Mammoth WVH began touring, with Frank Sidoris, Jon Jourdan, Ronnie Ficarro, and Garrett Whitlock rounding out the touring lineup. The band's name would later be shortened to simply Mammoth.

In 2023, Van Halen was one of the guitarists in "I'm Just Ken", recorded for the Barbie soundtrack. He would later appear in the song's live performance during the 96th Academy Awards.

=== Awards and recognition ===
Van Halen was nominated for a 2022 Grammy Award in the category of Best Rock Song for his song "Distance", from his album Mammoth WVH. He wrote the song when his father was dealing with complications from cancer. "[Eddie] cried when he first heard it. It was a really special moment that I'll never forget." Both "Distance" and his second single, "Don't Back Down", reached #1 on the Billboard's Mainstream Rock Airplay Chart. The band is the first act to send its first two songs to No. 1 on the chart since The Glorious Sons in 2019.

== Musical style ==
Wolfgang started playing the bass as his father started asking if he wanted to play with him. Van Halen first viewed bass as "an easier version of guitar, but as soon as I started playing it I realized how wrong that was", but stated that his experience with a guitar made it easier for him to deal with the instrument. His style was described by Eddie as a "rhythm bassist, like I'm a rhythm guitarist and a bassist put together." When he began playing bass, his inspirations were Les Claypool of Primus and Justin Chancellor of Tool. He also enjoys Chris Wolstenholme of Muse, John Entwistle of The Who, Jack Bruce of Cream "and all of the classic players".

Wolfgang is primarily a hard rock, alternative rock, and heavy metal musician. However, he has also released a few pop songs under the Mammoth name, namely "Think It Over" and "Distance".

== Personal life ==
Named in homage to the classical composer Wolfgang Amadeus Mozart, he is the only child of Dutch-American guitarist Eddie Van Halen and American actress Valerie Bertinelli. He is also the nephew of drummer Alex Van Halen. Wolfgang has said that he did not know his father was a famous musician until he "started picking up CDs and saw his father's picture on them".

Wolfgang Van Halen announced his engagement to longtime girlfriend Andraia Allsop on July 6, 2022. The two married on October 15, 2023.

== Discography ==
with Van Halen

- A Different Kind of Truth (2012)
- Tokyo Dome Live in Concert (2015)

with Tremonti

- Cauterize (2015)
- Dust (2016)

with Mammoth

- Mammoth WVH (2021)
- Mammoth II (2023)
- The End (2025)

as a featured musician

- The Strange Case Of... by Halestorm (2012)
- God Bless the Renegades by Clint Lowery (2020)
