= Piece of Mind =

Studio album by Iron Maiden
- Released: 16 May 1983
- Recorded: January–March 1983
- Studio: Compass Point (Nassau, Bahamas)
- Genre: Heavy metal
- Length: 45:28
- Label: EMI
- Producer: Martin Birch

Iron Maiden chronology
The Number of the Beast (1982)	Piece of Mind (1983)	Powerslave (1984)

Singles from Piece of Mind
- 1. "Flight of Icarus" Released: 11 April 1983; 2. "The Trooper" Released: 20 June 1983

Piece of Mind is the fourth studio album by English heavy metal band Iron Maiden. It was released on 16 May 1983 in the United Kingdom by EMI Records and in the United States by Capitol Records. It was the first album to feature drummer Nicko McBrain, who had recently left the band Trust.

Piece of Mind was a critical and commercial success, reaching number three on the UK Albums Chart and achieving platinum certification in the UK and North America.

== Background ==
In December 1982, drummer Clive Burr ended his association with the band due to personal and tour schedule problems and was replaced by Nicko McBrain, previously of French band Trust, as well as Pat Travers and Streetwalkers. Soon afterwards, the band went to Jersey to compose the songs, taking over the hotel Le Chalet (as it was out of season) and rehearsing in its restaurant. In February, the band journeyed for the first time to the Bahamas to record the album at Nassau's Compass Point Studios. Recordings were finished in March, and the album was later mixed at Electric Lady Studios in New York City.

This is the first of four Iron Maiden albums that were not named after a song featured on the album itself (though the lyrics in the song "Still Life" contain the expression "peace of mind"). Originally, the release's working title was Food for Thought—once the band had decided that Eddie would be lobotomised on the front cover—until the band came up with the title Piece of Mind in a pub in Jersey during the album's writing stage.

Included in the liner notes is a slightly altered version of a passage from the Book of Revelation, which reads,

And God shall wipe away all tears from their eyes; and there shall be no more Death. Neither sorrow, nor crying. Neither shall there be any more brain; for the former things are passed away.

The actual text (from Chapter 21, Verse 4) is nearly identical, except that it reads, "neither shall there be any more pain" rather than "brain", which was added as a pun on the album's title.

In a lower corner on the back side of the album cover, there is this message: "No synthesisers or ulterior motives".

== Composition ==
Lyrically, the album largely reflects the group's literary interests, such as "To Tame a Land", inspired by Frank Herbert's 1965 science fiction novel Dune; "Sun and Steel", based on the life of samurai Miyamoto Musashi and its title taken from Yukio Mishima's 1968 essay Sun and Steel; "Still Life", influenced by Ramsey Campbell's 1964 short story "The Inhabitant of the Lake", and "The Trooper", inspired by Alfred, Lord Tennyson's "The Charge of the Light Brigade" (1854). Film influences are also present, such as "Where Eagles Dare", based on the Brian G. Hutton 1968 film of the same title, scripted by Alistair MacLean, and "Quest for Fire", based on the 1981 film by Jean-Jacques Annaud, which incorrectly puts together, in the same period of History, dinosaurs and men. On top of this, "Revelations", written by Dickinson, includes lines from G. K. Chesterton's hymn "O God of Earth and Altar", while the remainder of the song is influenced by Aleister Crowley. More exotic influences include Greek mythology, albeit slightly altered, for "Flight of Icarus". "To Tame a Land" was intended to be titled "Dune" after the novel, but after seeking permission from Frank Herbert's agents, the band received a message that stated: "Frank Herbert doesn't like rock bands, particularly heavy rock bands, and especially bands like Iron Maiden", and were forced to change the name.

=== Hidden message ===
At the beginning of the sixth track, "Still Life", the band included a hidden message which could only be understood by playing the song backwards. This was a joke and an intended swing back at the critics who had accused Iron Maiden of being Satanic. The backwards message consists of drummer Nicko McBrain mimicking actor John Bird's impression of Idi Amin, uttering the following phrase "What ho said the t'ing with the three 'bonce', don't meddle with things you don't understand...", followed by a belch. The phrase itself is taken from the satirical album The Collected Broadcasts of Idi Amin (1975) by Bird and Alan Coren. "What ho" and "What ho said the t'ing" are phrases that also crop up regularly on McBrain's "Listen With Nicko!" tracks from The First Ten Years collection.

According to McBrain, "We were sick and tired of being labelled as Devil worshippers and all this bollocks by these fucking morons in the States, so we thought, 'Right, you want to take the piss? We'll show you how to take the bleeding piss, my son!' And one of the boys taped me in the middle of this Idi Amin routine I used to do when I'd had a few drinks. I remember it distinctly ended with the words, 'Don't meddle wid t'ings yo don't understand.' We thought, if people were going to be stupid about this sort of thing, we might as well give them something to be really stupid about, you know?"

== Release and reception ==
Professional ratings
Review scores
Source	Rating
AllMusic	4.5/5 stars
Record Mirror	4/5 stars
Kerrang!	Very Good
Sputnikmusic	4.5/5 stars
Ultimate Guitar	8.7/10
Metal.de	9/10
Pitchfork	8.5/10
Rolling Stone	2/5 stars

Preceded by the single "Flight of Icarus" on 28 April, Piece of Mind was released on 16 May 1983. It peaked at No. 3 in the UK and spent eighteen weeks on the chart.

In North America, the album became the band's highest charting thus far, peaking at No.14 in the Billboard 200. By July, Piece of Mind was certified gold by the RIAA, rising up to platinum status in 1986. In 1995, the album achieved platinum status in the UK.

Retrospective reviews were mostly positive, with Sputnikmusic hailing it "easily an album that belongs in your collection" (although they argue that "the likes of Powerslave [1984], Somewhere in Time [1986], and Brave New World [2000] would overtake it").

AllMusic described it as "essential for anyone with even the most basic interest in heavy metal", although "the second half dips a bit from the first". In a mixed review from Rolling Stone: "Both Piece of Mind and Powerslave proceed in kind, albeit with diminished melodic interest..." A reviewer from Ultimate Guitar added "Not Maiden's best, but certainly not their worst. A hearty addition to the collection of any metal fan. As usual Maiden serves up another classic of epic proportions."

German reviewer Metal.de stated (in a basic translation from the original German-language text): "'Piece of Mind' is another highlight in Iron Maiden's discography. The hit factor remains incredibly high—so much so that it is easy to overlook the fact that the album stumbles slightly in the home stretch."

In 1983, Kerrang! published a poll of the greatest metal albums of all time, with Piece of Mind ranking number 1 and The Number of the Beast at number 2.

It was ranked No. 21 on IGN's list of the top 25 metal albums in 2007. In 2013, Loudwire dubbed it the third-best metal album of 1983.

== Tour ==
The UK leg of the World Piece Tour opened at Hull City Hall on 2 May. Subsequent legs in Europe, the US, followed by a second European tour were later carried out before the tour concluded on 18 December with a televised performance at Westfalenhalle in Dortmund. A total of 139 shows were performed throughout the tour.

The tour was supported by Grand Prix in the UK, Rock Goddess during the first European leg, Saxon, Fastway, Coney Hatch, Quiet Riot and Axe in the US, and by the Michael Schenker Group during the second European leg. Local Dutch band Vandale also supported the band during their show in Kerkrade.

== Cover versions ==
In 2010, Maiden uniteD, featuring lead singer Damian Wilson, released an all-acoustic reinterpretation of the album titled Mind the Acoustic Pieces.

Two songs were covered for the 2008 tribute album Maiden Heaven: A Tribute to Iron Maiden: "The Trooper" by Coheed and Cambria and "To Tame a Land" by Dream Theater. The latter was also included in the special edition of Dream Theater's 2009 album Black Clouds & Silver Linings.

"The Trooper" has been covered by Finnish doom/death metal band Sentenced on their 1994 EP The Trooper, the American heavy metal band Iced Earth on the "tour edition" of their 2011 album, Dystopia, the death metal band Vital Remains on the 1998 tribute album A Call to Irons, Christian metal band Stryper on the album The Covering in 2011, and Swedish lounge act Hellsongs on their 2008 album, Hymns in the Key of 666. In 2024, Mongolian folk metal band The Hu released a Mongolian-language version of "The Trooper" on their EP of the same title.

"Where Eagles Dare" has been covered by Fozzy on their 2002 album Happenstance, by Týr on their 2013 album Valkyrja, and by Deliverance on their 2013 album Hear What I Say!.

== Track listing ==
Side one
No.	Title	Writer(s)	Length
1.	"Where Eagles Dare"	Steve Harris	6:08
2.	"Revelations"	Bruce Dickinson	6:51
3.	"Flight of Icarus"	Adrian Smith; Dickinson	3:49
4.	"Die with Your Boots On"	Smith; Dickinson; Harris	5:22

Side two
No.	Title	Writer(s)	Length
5.	"The Trooper"	Harris	4:10
6.	"Still Life"	Dave Murray; Harris	4:37
7.	"Quest for Fire"	Harris	3:40
8.	"Sun and Steel"	Dickinson; Smith	3:25
9.	"To Tame a Land"	Harris	7:26
Total length:			45:28

1995 reissue bonus disc
No.	Title	Writer(s)	Length
1.	"I've Got the Fire" (Montrose cover)	Ronnie Montrose	2:38
2.	"Cross-Eyed Mary" (Jethro Tull cover)	Ian Anderson	3:55
Total length:			6:33

- The song "To Tame a Land" is inspired by Frank Herbert's sci-fi novel Dune, and was originally intended to share the book's title. However, the band was forced to retitle it as "To Tame a Land" after Herbert's agent refused permission, famously stating that the author "doesn't like rock bands, particularly heavy rock bands, and especially bands like Iron Maiden". Because this change occurred at the last minute, a few initial pressings of the album retained the "Dune" song title.
- The first North American picture disc edition includes "Cross-Eyed Mary" as a bonus track on side one.
- The first Japanese CD pressing from 1986 has the hidden message preceding "Still Life" included as a separate track listed as "Phatoor".

== Personnel ==
Production and performance credits are adapted from the album liner notes.

=== Iron Maiden ===
- Bruce Dickinson – vocals
- Dave Murray – guitars
- Adrian Smith – guitars
- Steve Harris – bass guitar
- Nicko McBrain – drums

=== Production ===
- Martin "Black Night" Birch – producer, engineer, mixing
- Frank Gibson – assistant engineer
- Denis Haliburton – assistant engineer
- Bruce Buchhalter – assistant mixing engineer
- Derek Riggs – sleeve illustration, sleeve design, sleeve concept
- Simon Fowler – photography
- Keith Peacock – art continuation
- Rod Smallwood – sleeve design, sleeve concept
- George Marino at Sterling Sound – Original US LP mastering
- Utopia Studios, London UK – Original UK LP mastering
- Simon Heyworth – remastering (1998 edition)
- Ross Halfin – photography (1998 edition)
- Robert Ellis – photography (1998 edition)

== Charts ==
=== Weekly charts ===
Chart (1983)	Peak position
Australian Albums (Kent Music Report)	17
Austrian Albums (Ö3 Austria)	10
Canada Top Albums/CDs (RPM)	10
Dutch Albums (Album Top 100)	9
Finnish Albums (The Official Finnish Charts)	2
German Albums (Offizielle Top 100)	8
Italian Albums (Musica e dischi)	18
Japanese Albums (Oricon)	26
New Zealand Albums (RMNZ)	8
Norwegian Albums (VG-lista)	9
Swedish Albums (Sverigetopplistan)	6
UK Albums (Official Charts)	3
US Billboard 200	14

Chart (2006)	Peak position
Spanish Albums (Promusicae)	64

Chart (2010)	Peak position
Greek Albums (IFPI)	39

Chart (2012)	Peak position
Swedish Albums (Sverigetopplistan)	34

Chart (2018–2020)	Peak position
Hungarian Albums (MAHASZ)	16
UK Rock & Metal Albums (Official Charts)	8

=== Year-end charts ===
Chart (1983)	Position
German Albums (Offizielle Top 100)	57

== Certifications ==
Region	Certification	Certified units/sales
Australia (ARIA)	Gold	20,000^{^}
Canada (Music Canada)	2× Platinum	200,000^{^}
Finland (Musiikkituottajat)	Gold	25,000
Germany (BVMI)	Gold	250,000^{^}
Japan (RIAJ)	Gold	100,000^{^}
New Zealand (RMNZ)	Gold	7,500^{^}
Sweden (GLF)	Gold	50,000^{^}
United Kingdom (BPI)	Platinum	300,000^{^}
United States (RIAA)	Platinum	1,000,000^{^}
^{^} Shipments figures based on certification alone.
