= I Got the Fire =

1974 song recorded by Montrose

Song by Montrose

from the album Paper Money
- Released: October 11, 1974
- Genre: Rock
- Length: 3:06
- Label: Warner Bros.
- Songwriter: Montrose
- Producers: Ted Templeman, Montrose

"I Got the Fire" is a song written by American musician Ronnie Montrose and originally recorded by his band Montrose in 1974. It was later covered by Axe in 1982 and Iron Maiden in 1983.

== Recorded versions ==
=== Montrose version ===
The song was originally released by Montrose on their 1974 Paper Money album. The guitar solo was the result of a fortunate accident. As AllMusic noted, it was the result of "a studio screwup which resulted in the bottom-heavy reverberating noise in its intro." The song was one of the last the band recorded with original vocalist Sammy Hagar before he left Montrose to start a solo career.

=== Iron Maiden version ===
"I've Got the Fire"

Song by Iron Maiden
- A-side: "Flight of Icarus"
- Released: 11 April 1983
- Recorded: 1983
- Genre: Hard rock
- Length: 2:37
- Label: EMI
- Songwriter: Montrose
- Producer: Martin Birch

With a slight title change to "I've Got the Fire", the song was covered by English heavy metal band Iron Maiden as the B-side of their "Flight of Icarus" single in 1983. The band had earlier released a live version of the song as the B-side of their "Sanctuary" single in 1980. The 1983 version was a studio recording.

=== Axe version ===
The song was also covered in 1982 by US hard rock band Axe for their album Offering. Axe featured former Blackfoot vocalist Bobby Barth.

=== Rest in Pieces version ===
The song was also covered in 1990 by New York hardcore/metal band Rest in Pieces on their album Under My Skin.
