= Flyin' High (Blackfoot album) =

Studio album by Blackfoot
- Released: December 1976
- Studio: Muscle Shoals Sound Studio, Sheffield, Alabama
- Genre: Southern rock
- Length: 37:45
- Label: Epic
- Producer: David Hood, Jimmy Johnson

Blackfoot chronology
No Reservations (1975)	Flyin' High (1976)	Strikes (1979)

Professional ratings
Review scores
Source	Rating
AllMusic	2.5/5 stars

Flyin' High is the second album by the American Southern rock band Blackfoot, released in 1976.

Of the band's first five albums, this is the only one not to feature contributions from Rickey Medlocke's grandfather Shorty Medlocke.

== Track listing ==
All tracks are written by Rickey Medlocke and Jakson Spires. Additional writers where indicated.

No.	Title	Writer(s)	Length
1.	"Feelin' Good"		2:47
2.	"Flyin' High"	Charlie Hargrett	4:20
3.	"Try a Little Harder"	Hargrett	4:48
4.	"Stranger on the Road"		2:43
5.	"Save Your Time"		3:43
6.	"Dancin' Man"	Hargrett	3:38
7.	"Island of Life"		4:07
8.	"Junkie's Dream"		3:57
9.	"Madness"		4:56
10.	"Mother"		2:46

== Personnel ==
=== Band members ===
- Rickey Medlocke – lead vocals, guitars
- Charlie Hargrett – guitars
- Greg T. Walker – bass guitar, keyboards, guitar on "Mother", backing vocals
- Jakson Spires – drums, percussion, backing vocals

=== Additional musicians ===
- Suzy Storm, Laura Struzick – backing vocals

=== Production ===
- Producers: David Hood, Jimmy Johnson
- Engineers: Greg Hamm, Jerry Masters
- Mixed by Steve Melton
- Mastered by George Marino
- Design: Andy Engel
- Photography by Arthur Maillet, Teresa Alfieri
