= Siogo =

Studio album by Blackfoot
- Released: May 1983
- Recorded: Subterranean Studios and Solid Sound, Ann Arbor, Michigan; The Recording Connection Mobile, Cleveland, Ohio
- Genre: Southern rock
- Length: 37:41
- Label: Atco
- Producer: Al Nalli

Blackfoot chronology
Marauder (1981)	Siogo (1983)	Vertical Smiles (1984)

Professional ratings
Review scores
Source	Rating
Allmusic	3/5 stars

Siogo is the sixth album by the American Southern rock band Blackfoot, released in 1983. It is the first of two albums featuring former Uriah Heep keyboardist Ken Hensley.

Although the band told their record company that "Siogo" was an Indian word for "closeness" or "togetherness", it is actually an acronym for "Suck It Or Get Out". According to guitarist Charlie Hargrett, it was coined by the band's road crew and put up as a sign in the front lounge of their tour bus during previous tours.

"Heart's Grown Cold" is a cover and originally appeared on the 1980 Nazareth album Malice In Wonderland.

== Track listing ==
No.	Title	Writer(s)	Length
1.	"Send Me an Angel"	Ken Hensley, Jack Williams	4:36
2.	"Crossfire"	Rickey Medlocke, Charlie Hargrett, Jakson Spires, Robert Barth	4:08
3.	"Heart's Grown Cold"	Zal Cleminson	3:32
4.	"We're Goin' Down"	Medlocke, Spires	4:12
5.	"Teenage Idol"	Medlocke, Spires	4:48
6.	"Goin' In Circles"	Medlocke, Spires	3:06
7.	"Run for Cover"	Medlocke, Spires, Hensley	4:12
8.	"White Man's Land"	Medlocke, Spires	2:55
9.	"Sail Away"	Medlocke, Spires, Hargrett, Hensley	4:30
10.	"Drivin' Fool"	Medlocke, Spires	4:48

== Personnel ==
Band members

- Rickey Medlocke - lead vocals, guitars
- Charlie Hargrett - guitars
- Ken Hensley - keyboards, slide guitar on "Drivin' Fool", backing vocals
- Greg T. Walker - bass guitar, backing vocals
- Jakson Spires - drums, percussion, backing vocals

Additional musicians

- Michael Osborne, Lala - backing vocals

Production

- Al Nalli - producer
- Pat Schneider - engineer
- Arnie Rosenberg, Robert Bene, Will Spencer - assistant engineers
- Bob Ludwig - mastering

== Charts ==
Chart (1983)	Peak position
Swedish Albums (Sverigetopplistan)	36
UK Albums (OCC)	28
US Billboard 200	82
