= Greg T. Walker =

American bassist (born 1951)

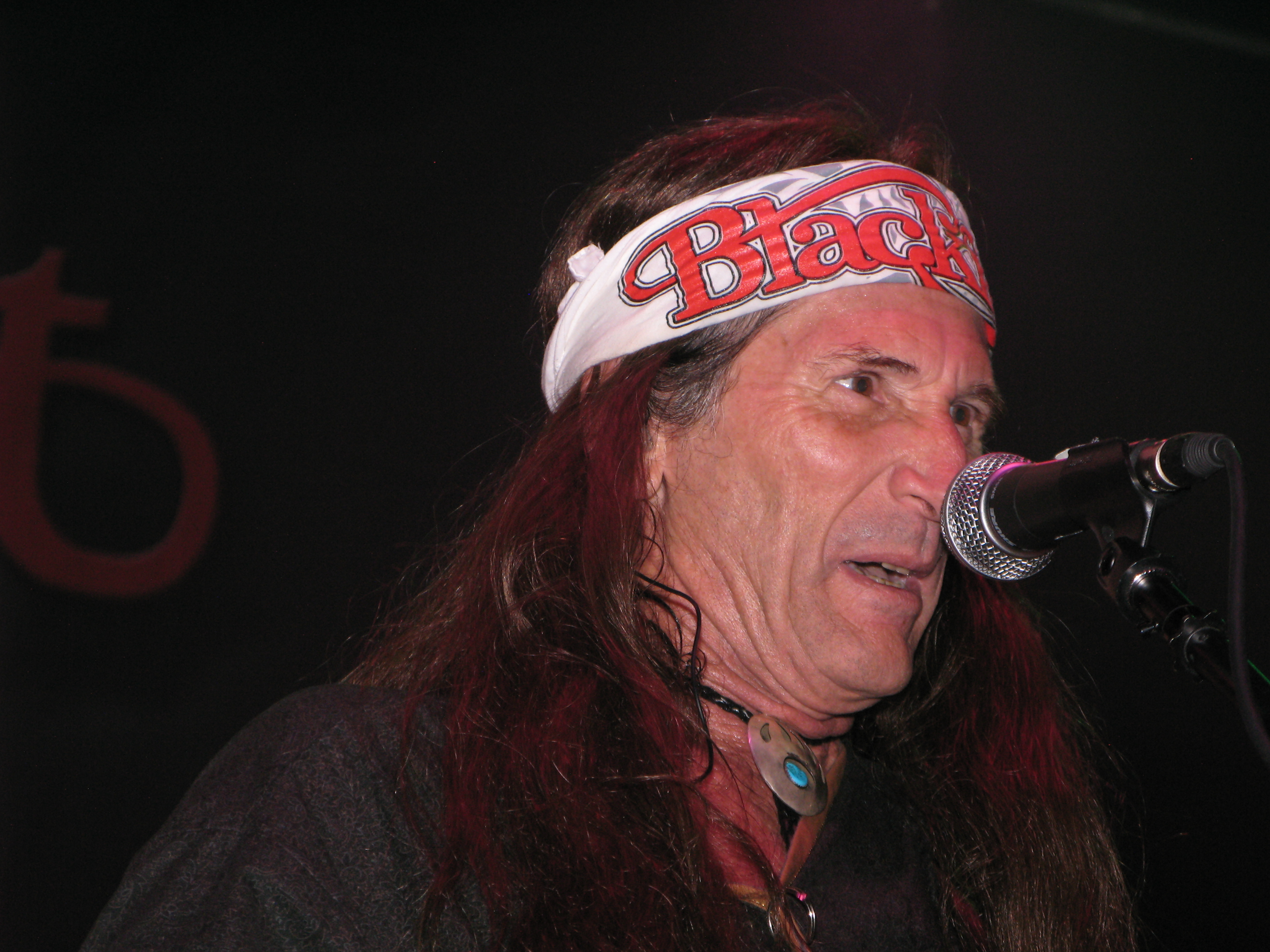
- Spires on stage with Blackfoot in 2008

Background information
- Born: July 8, 1951 (age 75)
- Genre: Rock
- Instruments: Bass, keyboards
- Years active: 1969–present
- Formerly of: Blackfoot, Lynyrd Skynyrd

Greg T. Walker (born 8 July 1951) is an American bassist who played with rock bands Blackfoot from 1969 and 2011 and Lynyrd Skynyrd between 1971 and 1972.

== Career ==
Walker's first band was formed when he was ten years old, and included his friends Rickey Medlocke and Jackson Spires.

Walker was a founding member of Blackfoot, founded with his childhood friends Medlocke, Spires, and Charlie Hargrett. In 1971, the first carnation of Blackfoot disbanded, and he joined Lynyrd Skynyrd, around three months after Medlocke had joined as a drummer. Both men knew the band members personally prior to joining. A year later, they both left the band and reformed Blackfoot, as according to Walker "It was a matter of it was a different kind of rock. I missed Blackfoot because I was used to that hard driving rock. I just wanna rock. I told Rickey my desires and he agreed. So, we left at the same time."

With Blackfoot, Walker performed on their first seven studio albums before he departed in 1986. He then reformed the group with Hargrett and Spires in 2004, which he remained with until 2011, when Medlocke, the owner of the band name, formed a new group with no original members.

Currently, Walker plays in the band Two Wolf, a band he formed in 2015. Two Wolf released their self-titled debut album in June 2025. He also takes part in the yearly Rock Legends Cruise.

== Personal life ==
Walker has Native American heritage; he is part Eastern Muscogee Creek. Walker makes his own Native American jewerelly.

Walker lives in Florida. Before he moved to Florida, he lived in Texas, where he adopted abused and abandoned horses and trained them.

== Discography ==
=== With Blackfoot ===
- No Reservations (1975)
- Flyin' High (1976)
- Strikes (1979)
- Tomcattin' (1980)
- Marauder (1981)
- Siogo (1983)
- Vertical Smiles (1984)

=== With Lynyrd Skynyrd ===
- Street Survivors (1977) (Bass on One More Time recorded during 1971-72)
- Skynyrd's First and... Last (1978)
