= Tomcattin' =

Studio album by Blackfoot
- Released: June 1980
- Recorded: 1980
- Studio: Subterranean Studio, Ann Arbor, Michigan; Roadmaster #2, Cleveland, Ohio; Sound Suite Studios, Detroit, Michigan; Bee Jay Studios, Orlando, Florida
- Genre: Southern rock, hard rock
- Length: 40:35
- Label: Atco
- Producer: Al Nalli and Henry Weck

Blackfoot chronology
| Strikes (1979) | Tomcattin' (1980) | Marauder (1981) |

Professional ratings
Review scores
| Source | Rating |
|---|---|
| AllMusic | 4/5 stars |
| Martin Popoff | 9/10 stars |

Tomcattin' is the fourth studio album by Southern rock band Blackfoot, released in 1980. The album features Shorty Medlocke, grandfather of band member Rickey Medlocke, on "Fox Chase". While the album did not spawn any hit singles, it was enough to keep the band's devoted fan base loyal and strong. It remains a popular staple in Blackfoot's catalogue.

== Track listing ==
All songs composed by Rickey Medlocke and Jakson Spires, except where indicated

Side one

1. "Warped" – 4:12
2. "On the Run" – 4:00
3. "Dream On" (R. Medlocke, Spires, Greg T. Walker) – 5:16
4. "Street Fighter" (Charlie Hargrett, Medlocke, Spires) – 2:34
5. "Gimme, Gimme, Gimme" – 4:06

Side two

6. "Every Man Should Know (Queenie)" – 3:43
7. "In the Night" – 3:52
8. "Reckless Abandoner" – 5:13
9. "Spendin' Cabbage" – 3:15
10. "Fox Chase" (R. Medlocke, Shorty Medlocke, Spires) – 4:23

== Personnel ==
Blackfoot

- Rickey Medlocke – lead vocals, lead, bottleneck, acoustic and 12-string guitars
- Charlie Hargrett – lead guitar
- Greg T. Walker – bass, backing vocals
- Jakson Spires – drums, backing vocals, percussion

Additional musicians

- Shorty Medlocke – harmonica on "Fox Chase"
- Pat McCaffrey – keyboards and saxes
- Henry Weck – percussion
- Donna Davis, Pamela Vincent, Melody McCully – backing vocals
- Peter Ruth – electric harmonica

Production

- Al Nalli – producer
- Henry Weck – producer, engineer
- W.D. Woods II, Andy De Ganhal – mixing assistants
- Greg Calbi – mastering at Sterling Sound, New York

== Charts ==
| Chart (1980) | Peak position |
|---|---|
| US Billboard 200 | 50 |
