= No Reservations (Blackfoot album) =

Studio album by Blackfoot
- Released: September 1975
- Studio: Muscle Shoals, Sheffield, Alabama
- Genre: Southern rock, hard rock
- Length: 36:32
- Label: Antilles
- Producer: Jimmy Johnson, David Hood

Blackfoot chronology
No Reservations (1975)	Flyin' High (1976)

Professional ratings
Review scores
Source	Rating
AllMusic	3/5 stars
The Rolling Stone Record Guide	3/5 stars

No Reservations is the first album by the American Southern rock band Blackfoot, released in 1975.

== Track listing ==
All songs by Jakson Spires, except "Railroad Man" by Shorty Medlocke.

Side one
No.	Title	Length
1.	"Railroad Man"	2:22
2.	"Indian World"	2:52
3.	"Stars"	4:08
4.	"Not Another Maker"	5:08
5.	"Born to Rock & Roll"	3:37

Side two
No.	Title	Length
1.	"Take a Train"	4:23
2.	"Big Wheels"	5:05
3.	"I Stand Alone"	7:47
4.	"Railroad Man"	1:10
Total length:		36:32

2017 remastered bonus tracks
No.	Title	Length
10.	"Hunting for Yourself"	3:44
11.	"Bummed Out"	3:06
Total length:		43:22

The bonus tracks are by a different band, from Little Rock, Arkansas. They had one 45 RPM release on the San American label and were working on an album when the group split in early 1971.

== Personnel ==
Credits taken from original LP.

Band members

- Rickey Medlocke – lead vocals, rhythm, lead and acoustic guitars, dobro, mandolin
- Charlie Hargrett – lead, rhythm, and acoustic guitars
- Greg T. Walker – bass guitar, backing vocals, keyboards
- Jakson Spires – drums, backing vocals, percussion

Additional musicians

- Shorty Medlocke – lead vocals, banjo, acoustic guitar, and train whistle on "Railroad Man" (b-side version)
- Barbara Wyrick, Laura Struzick, Suzy Storm – background vocals
- Barry Beckett – keyboards (overdubs)
- Roger Hawkins – percussion (overdubs)

Production

- Jimmy Johnson and David Hood – producers
- George Marino – mastering engineer
