= Offering =

Offering may refer to:

== In religion ==
- A religious offering or sacrifice
- Alms, voluntary gifts to others, especially poor people, as an act of virtue
- Tithe, the tenth part of something, such as income, paid to a religious organization or government
- Offertory, the part of a worship service where gifts are given
- Sacred food as offering
- Votive offering
- Burnt offering

=== Buddhism ===
- Offering (Buddhism)
- Sur offering

=== Judaism ===
General article: Korban

- Dough offering
- Drink offering
- Gift offering
- Guilt offering
- Heave offering
- Incense offering
- Sin offering
- Slaughter offering
- Thank offering
- Thanksgiving offering
- Wave offering

=== Christianity ===
- Offering (Christianity)

==== Roman Catholicism ====
- Morning offering

==== Church of Jesus Christ of Latter-day Saints ====
- Fast offering

== Finance and business ==
- Alternative public offering, an alternative to an initial public offering
- Direct public offering, a method by which a business can offer stock directly to the public
- Follow-on offering, an issuance of stock after the company's initial public offering
- Initial public offering, a public offering for the first time
- Public offering, the offering of securities of a company to the public
- Public offering without listing, a public offering by non-Japanese firms in the Japanese market
- Seasoned equity offering, a new equity issue by an already publicly traded company
- Secondary market offering, an offering of a security that has been previously issued
- Securities offering, a round of investment, by which a business raises money

== Arts and entertainment ==
=== Film ===
- The Offering (1966 film), a Canadian drama film directed by David Secter
- The Offering (2004 film), an Australian film of 2004
- The Offering (2016 film), or The Faith of Anna Waters, an American-Singaporean horror film
- The Offering (2020 film), a 2020 Spanish thriller drama
- The Offering (2023 film), an American horror film

=== Literature ===
- The Offering, a 1975 play by Nuruddin Farah
- The Offering, a 2015 novel by Grace McCleen
- The Offering, a 1982 novel by Gerald Suster

=== Music ===
==== Albums ====
- Offering (Axe album), 1982
- Offering (Carpenters album), reissued as Ticket to Ride, 1969
- Offering (Cults album) or the title song, 2017
- Offering (Larry Coryell album) or the title song, 1972
- Offering: Live at Temple University, by John Coltrane, or the title song (see below), 2014 (recorded in 1966)
- Offering, an album by Merzbow (Masami Akita), 2004
- The Offering (Borealis album), 2018
- The Offering (Killah Priest album) or the title song, 2007
- The Offering (Larry Willis album) or the title song, 2008
- The Offering, by Mary Youngblood, 1998

==== Songs ====
- "Offering", by Chelsea Wolfe from Hiss Spun, 2017
- "Offering", by John Coltrane from Expression, 1967
- "An Offering", by Neurosis from Sovereign, 2000
- "The Offering", by Donna de Lory from The Unchanging, 2013
- "The Offering", by Insomnium from Heart Like a Grave, 2019
- "The Offering", by Sleep Token from Sundowning, 2019

=== Painting ===
- The Offering, a 1971 painting by Ray Crooke

== See also ==
- Offer (disambiguation)
- Offerings (disambiguation)
