= Mark Weorpel =

American guitarist and vocalist

Mark Woerpel
- Origin: United States
- Genres: Rock
- Occupation(s): Guitarist, vocalist, songwriter, music teacher
- Instrument(s): Guitar, vocals
- Years active: 1980s–present

Mark Woerpel is a rock guitarist and vocalist who has played in bands including, Blackfoot, Warp Drive, and Them Pesky Kids.

== Career ==
While part of the band Blackfoot, Woerpel played guitar alongside of the Lynyrd Skynyrd guitarist Rick Medlocke. Woerpel has composed songs including all ten tracks on Warp Drive's Compact disk that is titled Gimmie Gimmie. Woerpel left Blackfoot after Medlocke started writing songs in the country genre. Mark Woerpel currently is the lead guitarist for the band Them Pesky Kids. Mark also teaches guitar to students at a variety of skill levels. He now lives in Wisconsin on a hobby farm.
