= Train, Train =

1979 single by Blackfoot

Single by Blackfoot

from the album Strikes
- B-side: "Baby Blue"
- Released: October 1979
- Recorded: 1979
- Genre: Southern rock; hard rock; blues rock
- Length: 3:36
- Label: Atco
- Songwriter(s): Shorty Medlocke
- Producer(s): Al Nalli; Henry Weck

Blackfoot singles chronology
"Highway Song" (1979)	"Train, Train" (1979)	"Spendin' Cabbage" (1980)

"Train, Train" is a song by American Southern rock band Blackfoot and the second single from their third studio album Strikes (1979). It was written by Shorty Medlocke, the grandfather of Blackfoot frontman/guitarist Rickey Medlocke, and peaked at #38 on the Billboard Hot 100.

== Background ==
"Train, Train" was originally recorded in 1971 by Shorty Medlocke and his daughter, as Shorty Medlock & Mickey with the Fla. Plow Hands, and was the B-side of their single "If I Could Live It Over (I'd Be a Different Guy)".

== Composition ==
The song opens with a bluesy harmonica performance from Shorty Medlocke, followed by a guitar riff. The Rolling Stone Album Guide called the song a "truly tough guitar workout".

== Covers ==
The song was covered by metal band Warrant on their 1990 album Cherry Pie and country singer Dolly Parton on her 1999 album The Grass Is Blue.

== Charts ==
Chart (1979–1980)	Peak position
US Billboard Hot 100	38
