= Religious restrictions on the consumption of pork =

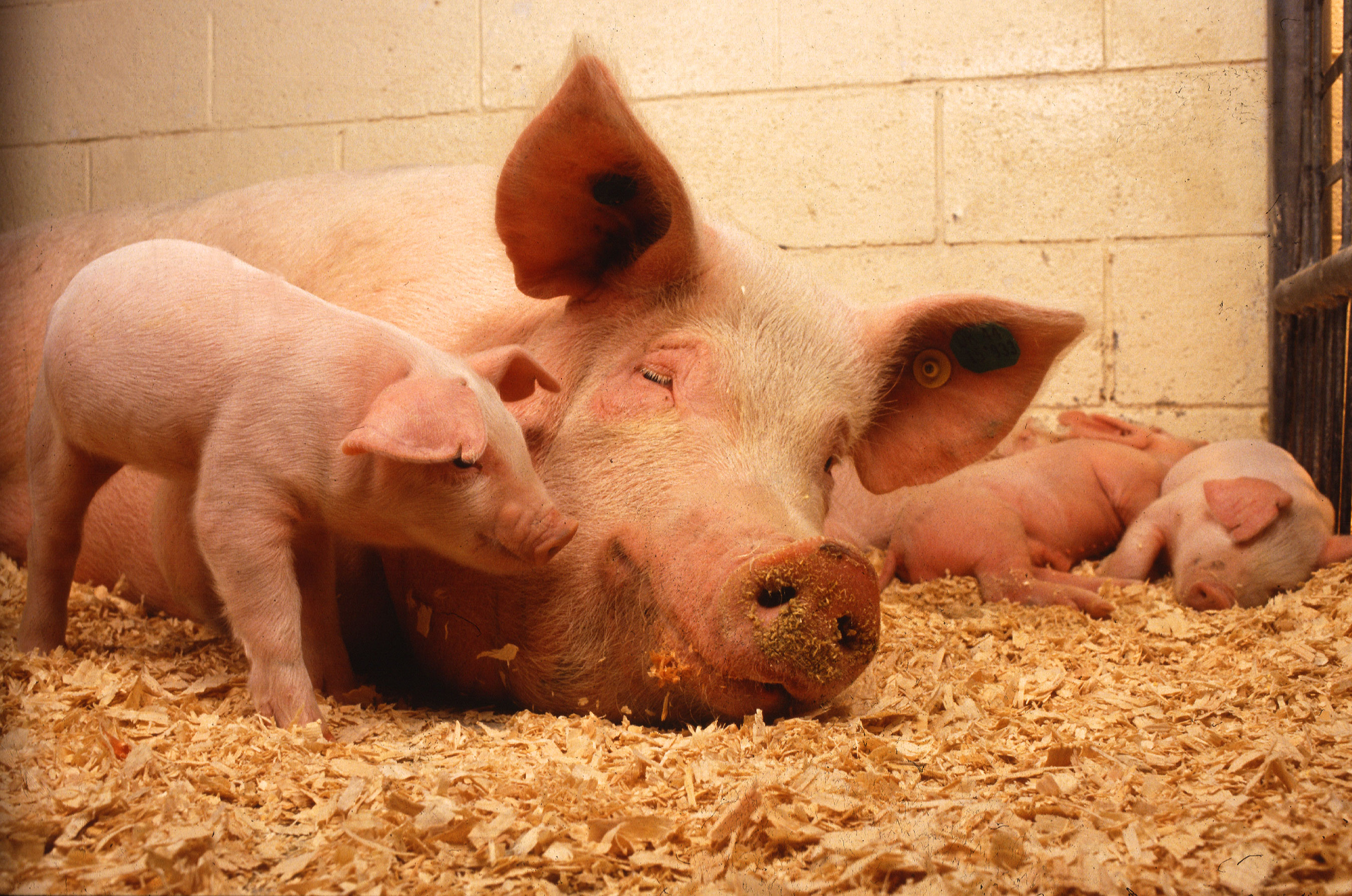
In the Torah, pigs are listed among several animals that the Hebrew God forbids for human consumption because they are considered to be ritually unclean. This sentiment is echoed in the Quran. Accordingly, pork and pork-based products are forbidden in Judaism and Islam, as well as among Christian denominations that adhere to Jewish dietary laws.

The consumption of pork by humans is restricted by many worldwide religions. This restriction is most notable for featuring in Judaism and Samaritanism, before being adopted by other Abrahamic religions such as Islam. It is thought to have its origin in a stigma that was already present in the ancient Near East, as before the rise of the Israelites—pork was prohibited in cultures in Mesopotamia, Egypt, and those of the Levant and Anatolia. The pig also represented a taboo observed at Comana in Pontus, as noted by the Greek geographer Strabo. A lost poem of the Greek poet Hermesianax, reported centuries later by the Greek geographer Pausanias, described an etiological myth of Attis being destroyed by a supernatural boar to account for the fact that "in consequence of these events, the Galatians who inhabit Pessinous do not touch pork."

In spite of the common religious stigma associated with pigs, pork remains the most consumed meat of any animal globally. With regard to Christianity, only certain sects that consider Jewish dietary laws to still be binding abstain from pork, including Hebrew Catholics, Seventh-day Adventists, Hebrew Roots, and Messianic Jews. Thus, the Christian-majority Western world is among the regions where pork consumption has historically been widespread, along with East Asia and parts of Southeast Asia.

== Ancient Near East ==
It was common in ancient Near East for pigs, dogs and other animals to be barred from religious places. 8th century BC Babylonian wisdom literature labels them as unclean and reviled by sun god Shamash due to their customs, even although pigs were raised and eaten in everyday life. Assyrians associated pigs to the demoness Lamashtu, if still consuming them as food and honoring boar hunting. Pigs were also sacrificed in Babylon during Akitu. An Assyrian tablet from 716 BC states "The pig is unholy bespattering his backside, making the streets smell, polluting the houses. The pig is not fit for a temple, lacks sense, is not allowed to tread on pavements, an abomination to all the gods, an abhorrence [to (his) god], accursed by Šamaš".

Ancient Egyptians also featured their own pork taboo, repeatedly recorded by Classical authors, although it seemed to apply only to priests. In turn, Egyptians were also said to sacrifice pigs once per year. It is heavily debated if Egyptian religious restrictions on pork might have influenced Jewish ones or vice versa. In Coffin Text 157, the pig is considered a cultic abomination and detestable to Horus.

The Hittites had prohibitions against pigs near temples and sacred sites, as they were considered unclean for those areas. While pigs were domesticated early in the Near East, they became considered impure in many different cultures. Amongst the Hittites, despite official and religious prohibitions against them, their domestication and consumption continued, though at a much lower scale than other farm animals.

According to Porphyry of Tyre, Phoenicians abstained from pork because it was not produced in their lands. He seems to have been under the mistaken impression this reason was the same for Jews, instead of an active proscription. Herodotus records than in Tyre, Phoenicia, it was forbidden for pork, women, and foreigners to be brought into the sanctuary of the temple of the deity Melqart. This restriction was attested during the Persian period. Pig bones in Phoenician archaeological sites are few, although not absent, with Carthage and Utica showing the biggest quantities.

Piglets were sacrificed in the Phoenician colony of Carthage after the introduction of the Greek cult of Demeter and Kore, brought back after the siege of Syracuse in 397 BC. Pork consumption in Carthage shot up after the Roman conquest of the territory, due especially to the important role of the pig in Roman culture.

"The pig tended to be regarded as a dangerously liminal animal. With the feet of a cud-eater, the diet of a scavenger, the habits of a dirt-dweller and the cunning of a human, it exhibited an unsettling combination of characteristics, rendering it culturally inedible for some (but not all) southern Levantine peoples, for whom pigs were often associated with the underworld or malevolent supernatural powers."

— Stavrakopoulou, Francesca

== In Jewish law ==
=== Israelite period ===
The Torah contains passages in the Book of Leviticus that list the animals that are permissible for human consumption. According to Leviticus 11:3, animals that have divided hooves and chew their cud—like cows, sheep, and deer—are kosher animals (permissible) and may be consumed by following Jewish jurisprudence for animal slaughter. Pigs do not qualify for this status because, despite having the feet of a typical cud-chewing animal, they do not chew their cud. The ban on the consumption of pork is repeated in the Book of Deuteronomy (14:8). Thus, pig farming was largely absent in Israel and Judah. However, there is an exemption in Judaism on the basis of pikuach nefesh, which allows a Jew to break almost any Torah commandment (including the restriction on consuming pork) without it counting as a sin if they find themselves in a life-threatening situation, namely starvation.

It was previously thought that an absence of pig remains at archaeological sites were indicative of Israelite ethnic presence, but research has challenged past assumptions. The pattern of pork consumption was complex and attributed to economics, environment and settlement type. In many cases the Philistines had less than 1% of pig use in their smaller towns and villages, and pig bones were instead common across the Northern Kingdom, while they were consistently rare in Judah.

=== Greco-Roman period ===
During the Roman period, abstinence from pork became one of the most identifiable features of the Jewish religion to outsiders. One example appears in Histories (5.4.1–2) by the Roman historian Tacitus.

Because Jewish dietary restrictions on pork were well-known to non-Jews, foreign attempts of oppression and assimilation of Jewish populations into Greco-Roman culture often involved attempting to force Jews into consuming pork. According to 2 Maccabees (6:18–7:48), the Seleucid emperor Antiochus IV Epiphanes attempted to force Jews in his realm to consume pork as part of his attempted restrictions on the practice of Judaism. In addition, the Jewish philosopher Philo of Alexandria records that during the Alexandrian anti-Jewish riots of 38, some Alexandrian mobs also attempted to force Jews into consuming pork. Some forms of Jewish Christianity also adopted these restrictions on the consumption of pork, as is noted in the early Christian treatise Didascalia Apostolorum.

== In Islamic law ==
=== Permissibility ===
Islamic dietary laws concerning pigs are directly extracted from the Quran, in which pork is only rendered permissible for those Muslims who find themselves in an undesirable situation that compels them to consume it. For example, if a Muslim is physically forced, intimidated, or tricked by an oppressor into consuming pork, or if they voluntarily resort to consuming pork because they are facing starvation, then they are entirely free of the sin and will not be judged for it.

Outside of emergencies, pork is haram (unlawful) and cannot be made halal (lawful) by following Islamic jurisprudence for animal slaughter.

==== Quranic passages ====
There are several passages in the Quran that mention pork being forbidden for human consumption, while also declaring amnesty for those who consume it in exceptional circumstances.

He has only forbidden for you [to eat] carrion, blood, swine, and that which is slaughtered in the name of any other than Allah. But if someone is compelled by necessity—neither driven by desire nor exceeding immediate need—there is no sin upon them. Indeed, Allah is All-Forgiving and All-Merciful.

— Al-Baqarah 2:173

"He has only forbidden for you [to eat] carrion, blood, swine, and that which is slaughtered in the name of any other than Allah. But if someone is compelled by necessity—neither driven by desire nor exceeding immediate need—then surely Allah is All-Forgiving and All-Merciful."

— An-Nahl 16:115

Say, O Prophet, "I do not find in what has been revealed to me anything forbidden to eat except carrion, running blood, swine—which is impure—or a sinful offering in the name of any other than Allah. But if someone is compelled by necessity—neither driven by desire nor exceeding immediate need—then surely your Lord is All-Forgiving and All-Merciful."

— Al-An'am 6:145

"For those who are Jewish, We forbade every animal with undivided hooves and the fat of oxen and sheep except what is joined to their backs or intestines or mixed with bone. In this way We rewarded them for their violations. And We are certainly truthful."

— Al-An'am 6:146

=== Arabian custom ===
According to the Roman historian Sozomen, some Arab polytheists in pre-Islamic Arabia who traced their ancestry to Ishmael abstained from consuming pork.

== Other religions ==
According to the Greek historian Herodotus, the Scythians had a taboo against the pig, which was never offered in sacrifice, and they apparently loathed so much as to even keep the animal within their lands.

A Scottish pork taboo purportedly existed until the 19th century, as discussed by the Scottish folklorist Donald Alexander Mackenzie. It was particularly prevalent among Highlanders, whom Mackenzie believed refrained from pork due to an ancient taboo. Several writers who confirm that there was a prejudice against pork consumption, or a generally superstitious attitude toward pigs, do not see it in terms of a taboo related to an ancient cult.

== Analyses of pork taboos ==
The American anthropologist Marvin Harris, specializing in cultural materialism, thought that the main reason for prohibiting consumption of pork was ecological and economical. Pigs require water and shady woods with seeds, but such conditions are scarce in the Near East. Unlike many other animals that are kept as livestock, pigs are not herbivores—they are omnivores and are also known for scavenging, which may have contributed to their reputation of ritual uncleanliness. Furthermore, a Near Eastern society keeping large stocks of pigs could destroy their ecosystem.

It is speculated that chickens supplanted pigs as a more portable and efficient source of meat, and these practical concerns led to the religious restrictions.

Medieval French rabbi Rashi wrote in his commentary on the Hebrew Bible and Talmud that the prohibition of pork as a Jewish dietary law that would be derided by others as making no sense. Rabbi and polymath Maimonides interpreted the common dietary laws chiefly as a means of keeping the body healthy in his Guide for the Perplexed. He argued that the meat of the forbidden animals, birds, and fish is unwholesome and indigestible. He said this does not seem to apply to pork since it does not appear to be harmful at first glance, however, since the pig is a filthy animal, using them for food would make marketplaces and houses dirtier than latrines.

The Sefer HaChinuch (an early work of halakha) gives a general overview of the Jewish dietary laws. The anonymous Levite writes "And if there are any reasons for the dietary laws which are unknown to us or those knowledgeable in the health field, do not wonder about them, for the true Healer that warns us against them is smarter than us, and smarter than the doctors."

== See also ==
- Food and drink prohibitions
  - Jewish dietary laws
    - Kosher foods
    - Kosher animals
  - Christian dietary laws
  - Islamic dietary laws
- Comparison of Islamic and Jewish dietary laws
  - Ritually unclean animal
- Pig toilet
