= Marauder (Blackfoot album) =

Studio album by Blackfoot
- Released: July 1981
- Recorded: Subterranean Studio, Ann Arbor, Michigan
- Genre: Southern rock, hard rock
- Length: 37:26
- Label: Atco
- Producer: Al Nalli, David L. Weck

Blackfoot chronology
Tomcattin' (1980)	Marauder (1981)	Highway Song Live (1982)

Professional ratings
Review scores
Source	Rating
AllMusic	4/5 stars
Martin Popoff	8/10 stars
The Rolling Stone Album Guide	2.5/5 stars

Marauder is the fifth studio album by the Southern rock band Blackfoot, released in 1981.

The album continued in the same vein as their previous successes, Strikes (1979) and Tomcattin' (1980). Opening up with the heavy "Good Morning", and including the ballad "Diary of a Workingman", Marauder also sported the hit "Fly Away", which reached No. 42, and another Shorty Medlocke appearance on the "Rattlesnake Rock n' Roller", this time with a spoken introduction and banjo solo. Marauder was the last of their albums that were purely hard, driving, rock – they unsuccessfully introduced synthesizers to their sound through the 1980s, and their popularity waned. Eduardo Rivadavia describes Marauder as "...one of the band's best hard rockers to date", and "the last great Blackfoot album".

The band officially broke up amid declining fortunes in the mid-1980s, though Medlocke resumed recording under the name Blackfoot a few years later. He is now, again, a member of Lynyrd Skynyrd.

Heavy metal band Exodus covered "Good Morning" which was released as a b-side to the single "The Lunatic Parade" (1990).

== Track listing ==
All songs written and composed by Rick Medlocke and Jakson Spires, except where noted.

Side one

1. "Good Morning" – 3:36
2. "Payin' for It" – 3:35
3. "Diary of a Workingman" – 5:36
4. "Too Hard to Handle" – 4:02
5. "Fly Away" – 2:58

Side two

6. "Dry County" – 3:42
7. "Fire of the Dragon" – 4:02
8. "Rattlesnake Rock 'n' Roller" (Shorty Medlocke, Rick Medlocke, Spires) – 4:01
9. "Searchin'" – 5:43

== Personnel ==
All credits adapted from album liner notes.

Blackfoot

- Rickey Medlocke – lead vocals, guitar
- Charlie Hargrett – guitar
- Greg T. Walker – bass guitar, keyboards, vocals
- Jakson Spires – drums, percussion, vocals

Additional musicians

- Henry Weck – percussion
- Shorty Medlocke – banjo intro on track 8
- Magic Rooster, Pat McCaffrey – horns, keyboards
- David Cavender – trumpet
- Donna Davis, Pamela Vincent – backing vocals

Production

- Al Nalli – producer
- Henry Weck – producer, engineer
- Andy de Ganhal – mixing assistant

== Charts ==
Chart (1981–1982)	Peak position
UK Albums (OCC)	38
US Billboard 200	48
