= Skinny Molly =

American rock band

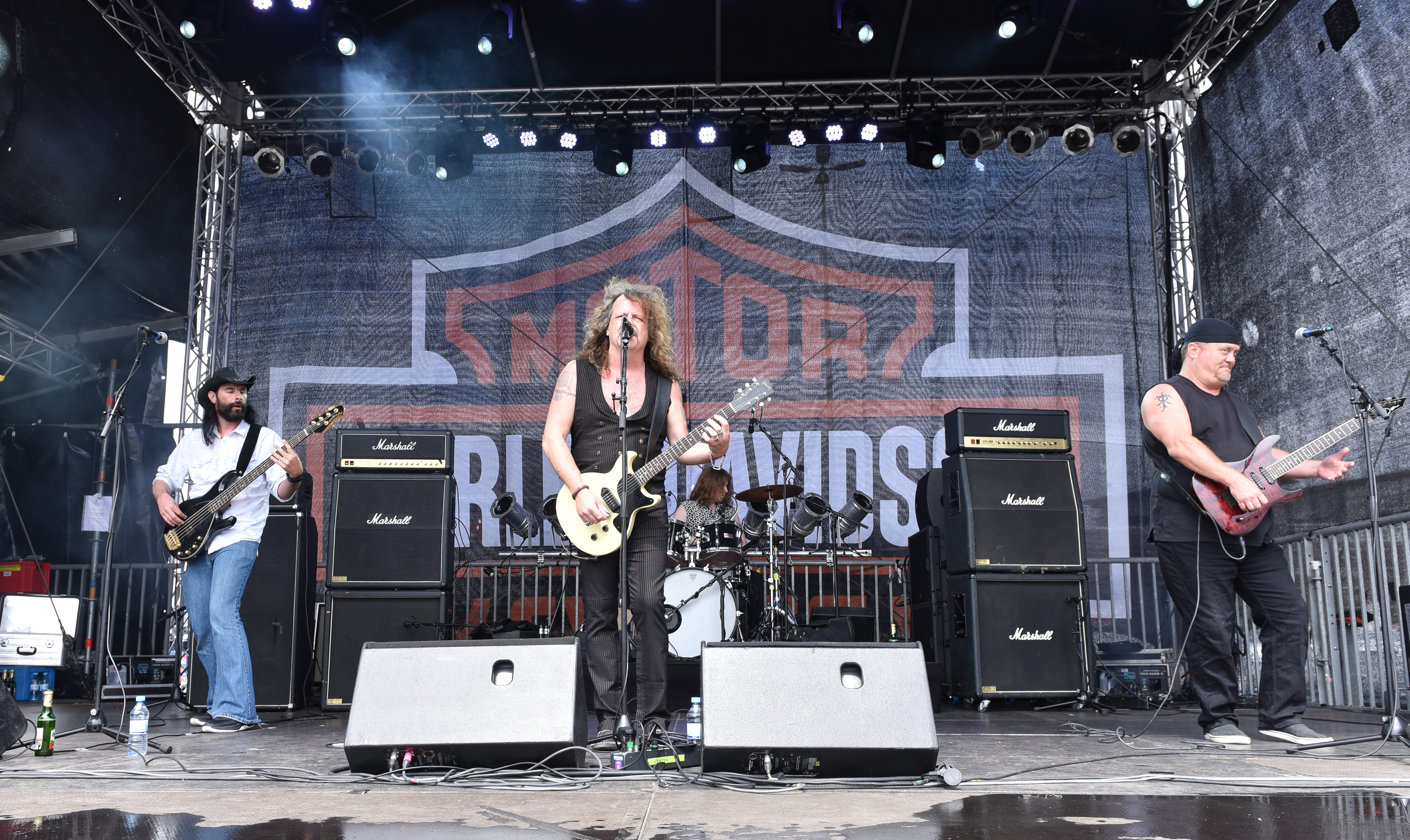

Background information
- Origin: Nashville, Tennessee, U.S.
- Genres: Southern rock, blues rock, hard rock, boogie rock, country rock
- Years active: 2004–present
- Labels: Moss Rose Records, Ruf Records
- Members: Mike Estes; Jay Johnson; Luke Bradshaw; Kurt Pietro
- Past members: Dave Hlubek; Chris Walker; Kyle Law; Ash Sims
- Website: skinnymollyrocks.com

Skinny Molly is an American southern rock band from Nashville, Tennessee, United States.

The band was formed in 2004 by guitarist/vocalist Mike Estes (guitar player for Lynyrd Skynyrd and Blackfoot), Dave Hlubek (guitarist and founding member of Molly Hatchet) and drummer Kurt Pietro. Hlubek rejoined Molly Hatchet in 2005 and was replaced by guitarist/vocalist Jay Johnson (formerly played with the Rossington Band and Blackfoot) in 2008. Nashville bluegrass and Grand Ole Opry bassist Luke Bradshaw joined Skinny Molly in 2007. This lineup continues to tour the US and Europe.

They released their first album in 2008 (No Good Deed) on Moss Rose Records. Their second album; Haywire Riot was released on Ruf Records in 2012.

In 2014 they released a new album called Here For A Good Time, the album features Ed King on the song "Make It Easy" and Joey Huffman on several other songs.

== Band members ==
=== Current ===
- Mike Estes - Guitar, lead vocals (2004–present)
- Jay Johnson - Guitar, vocals (2008–present)
- Luke Bradshaw - Bass (2007–present)
- Kurt Pietro - Drums (2004–present)

=== Former ===
- Dave Hlubek - Guitar (2004–2005; died 2017)
- Chris Walker - Guitar (2005–2008)
- Kyle Law - Drums (2018–2021)
- Ash Sims - Drums (2005-2007; UK only)

== Discography ==
=== Studio albums ===
- No Good Deed – 2008
- Haywire Riot – 2012
- Here for a Good Time – 2014
