= Vertical Smiles =

Studio album by Blackfoot
- Released: October 1984
- Genre: Southern rock
- Label: Atco
- Producers: Al Nalli, Eddy Offord

Blackfoot chronology
Siogo (1983)	Vertical Smiles (1984)	Rick Medlocke and Blackfoot (1987)

Vertical Smiles is the seventh studio album by Southern rock band Blackfoot.

It is the second and last album to feature former Uriah Heep keyboardist Ken Hensley and the first without guitarist Charlie Hargrett who left during the recording of the album over disagreements with the rest of the band and management.

== Critical reception ==
Professional ratings
Review scores
Source	Rating
Allmusic	1.5/5 stars

Eduardo Rivadavia of Allmusic largely detested the album, citing it as having "one of the most misogynistic title/cover tandems...since Montrose's equally tasteless and musically inadequate Jump on It eight years earlier." Though he conceded that "die-hard Blackfoot fans may be able to tolerate partially convincing hard rockers like 'Get It On' and 'Young Girl'," he concluded by stating "the surrounding embarrassments are simply too painful to warrant anyone else being exposed to the torment and disappointment that is Vertical Smiles."

== Track listing ==
Side one

1. "Morning Dew" (Bonnie Dobson cover) - 5:27
2. "Livin' in the Limelight" (Peter Cetera cover) - 4:02
3. "Ride with You" - 3:33
4. "Get It On" - 4:29

Side two

1. "Young Girl" - 4:24
2. "Summer Days" - 3:19
3. "A Legend Never Dies" (RPM cover) - 3:03
4. "Heartbeat and Heels" - 3:15
5. "In for the Kill" - 3:50

== Personnel ==
- Rickey Medlocke - lead and rhythm guitars, lead and backing vocals, guitar synthesizer
- Ken Hensley - keyboards, backing vocals
- Greg T. Walker - bass, backing vocals
- Jakson Spires - drums, backing vocals, percussion
- Sherri Jarrel - backing vocals

Production

- Engineered by Eddy Offord at Eddy Offord Studios, Atlanta, Georgia
- Mixed by Eddy Offord and Rick Medlocke
- Mastered at Atlantic Studios by Dennis King
- Front cover photography: Gary Heery, Bob Defrin
- Art Direction: Bob Defrin
- Produced by Al Nalli and Eddy Offord for Al Nalli Productions, INC.

== Charts ==
Chart (1984)	Peak position
Finnish Albums (The Official Finnish Charts)	24
Swedish Albums (Sverigetopplistan)	48
UK Albums (Official Charts)	82
US Billboard 200	176
