= Highway Song (Blackfoot song) =

Single by Blackfoot

from the album Strikes
- B-side: "Road Fever"
- Released: June 12, 1979
- Recorded: 1979
- Genre: Southern rock; hard rock
- Length: 7:00 (original album version); 7:30 (extended fade-out; later featured on their Greatest Hits album); 3:59 (single version)
- Label: Atco
- Songwriters: Rickey Medlocke; Jackson Spires
- Producers: Al Nalli; Henry Weck

Blackfoot singles chronology
"Railroad Man" (1975)	"Highway Song" (1979)	"Train, Train" (1979)

Music video
- "Highway Song" on YouTube

"Highway Song" is a song recorded by the American southern rock band Blackfoot and the lead single from their third studio album Strikes (1979). It was written by lead singer/guitarist Rickey Medlocke and drummer Jackson Spires. It reached #26 on the Billboard Hot 100. The song was recorded in the key of E minor with no key changes throughout. While the single version maintains its tempo throughout, the album version increases its speed at the close of the lyrical portion through the song's ending.

"Highway Song" has often been considered similar to the song "Free Bird" by Lynyrd Skynyrd, particularly because it closes out with a long stretch of guitar solos.

== Charts ==
Chart (1979)	Peak position
US Billboard Hot 100	26
