= Offer =

(The) Offer or offers may refer to:

== People ==
- Ofer Eshed or Offer Eshed (1942-2007), Israeli basketball player
- Offer Nissim (born 1964), Israeli house DJ
- Avner Offer, economic historian
- Dick Offer, English rower
- Jack Offer, English rower
- Or Offer (born 1983), Israeli entrepreneur and investor
- Steve Offer (born 1949), former Canadian politician
- Vince Offer (born 1964), Israeli-born American spokesperson

== Brands, enterprises and regulators ==
- Google Offers, was a service offering discounts and coupons
- Offers.com, an online marketplace
- Office of Electricity Regulation (OFFER), a forerunner of the current Office of Gas and Electricity Markets in Great Britain

== Business terms ==
- Proposal (business), a written offer from a seller to a prospective buyer
  - Offer price, the price a seller is willing to accept for a particular good
  - Tender offer, an offer to buy company stock from existing stockholders under specific conditions

== Law ==
- Firm offer, an offer that is irrevocable for a certain period or until a certain time or occurrence of a certain event
- Offer and acceptance, elements of a contract
- Offer of judgment, a United States tort reform law aimed at controlling unnecessary litigation and at encouraging settlement
- Settlement offer, an offer to end a civil lawsuit out of court

== Film and television ==
- Offers, a 2005 Dutch television film
- The Offer, a 2022 mini-series
- "The Offer" (Arrow), a 2015 episode
- "The Offer" (Desmond's), a 1989 episode
- "The Offer" (Most Dangerous Game), a 2020 episode
- "The Offer" (Parenthood), a 2014 episode
- "The Offer" (Steptoe and Son), a 1962 episode
- "The Offer" (The Office Movers), a 2024 episode

== See also ==
- Offering (disambiguation)
