= Flight of Icarus =

Single by Iron Maiden

from the album Piece of Mind
- B-side: "I Got the Fire"
- Released: 11 April 1983
- Recorded: 1983
- Genre: Heavy metal
- Length: 3:49
- Label: EMI
- Songwriters: Adrian Smith; Bruce Dickinson
- Producer: Martin Birch

Iron Maiden singles chronology
"The Number of the Beast" (1982)	"Flight of Icarus" (1983)	"The Trooper" (1983)

Music video
- Flight of Icarus on YouTube

"Flight of Icarus" is a song by English heavy metal band Iron Maiden from their fourth studio album, Piece of Mind (1983). It was their eighth single, and their first in the United States, where it received heavy rotation on MTV, and was one of their few to garner substantial radio airplay. It was Iron Maiden's highest charting single on the Billboard Hot Mainstream Rock Tracks chart, peaking at number 8, however, it was a lesser success in the UK, peaking at number 11 on the UK Singles Chart.

One of Iron Maiden's most famous songs, it was the band's first single composed entirely by members other than Steve Harris, credited to Adrian Smith and Bruce Dickinson. Long absent from live shows, "Flight of Icarus" was performed live for the first time in 32 years on May 26, 2018, in Tallinn, Estonia. During their hiatus from Iron Maiden, Dickinson and Smith performed the song live with Dickinson's solo band in the 1990s.

== Overview ==
The song is loosely based on the ancient Greek myth of Icarus who was imprisoned with his father Daedalus in the palace of Knossos on Crete. In an attempt to escape, the pair fabricated wings from feathers and wax so they could fly away. Unfortunately Icarus, not heeding the advice of his father, flew too close to the Sun, melting the wax that held the feathers and thus fell to his death in the sea.

In this version, an unnamed old man with blazing eyes stands on a hill facing a crowd, which may or may not be the protagonist's father. An unnamed youth, presumably Icarus, comes from the crowd and makes extended eye contact with the man. He tells the crowd that he flies "in the name of God." The chorus exclaims "Fly on your wings like an eagle," and to fly as high as & to touch the sun. As he flies, his eyes glaze as he "flies on the wings of a dream." His wings then turn to ash as he realizes his father has either been betrayed (if the old man is not his father) or has betrayed him (if this man is his father). He then dies. The chorus, however, continues to plead for someone to fly & touch the sun.

Written in the key of F-sharp minor, the song features a galloping pace and a high-pitched chorus. The solos are played by Dave Murray and Adrian Smith and, after a repetition of the main chorus, the song flows into a brief harmonized section followed by another solo—in double time—by Dave Murray; after a variation of the chorus ('Fly as high as the sun!'), it finally ends with a prolonged F-sharp minor chord over which Bruce Dickinson holds an A_{5}.

The single cover, in something of a parody of the original myth, portrays a winged Eddie killing Icarus with a flamethrower. Icarus resembles the figure in Evening: Fall of Day, by William Rimmer, which was used as a label logo by Led Zeppelin. According to the artist, Derek Riggs, this is a reference to Led Zeppelin's break-up a few years before.

The song received criticism in the UK on release, with Garry Bushell commenting, "Plodding rather than powerful, it seemed universally unpopular with hardcore British metallurgists whose worst fears were bolstered by the number's release as the first American single. Bassist Steve Harris has since said that "releasing 'Icarus' in the States was a mistake," going on to state that "I do wish we'd had time to break it in live before we recorded it, it's a lot more powerful live, a lot faster and heavier." In support of the song, Dickinson stated, "Steve never liked it. He thought it was too slow, but I wanted it to be that rocksteady sort of beat. I knew it would get onto American radio if we kept it that way, and I was right."

The song appears on the tribute album Numbers from the Beast, featuring Ripper Owens on vocals, Doug Aldrich on guitars, Jimmy Bain on bass, and Simon Wright on drums, and it was also covered by the progressive metal band Fates Warning in 1983.

== Music video ==
The video for this track was directed by Jim Yukich and was filmed in the Bahamas at Compass Point Studios (where the album was recorded) as the band played a staged recording session of the track. Drummer Nicko McBrain appeared as a blue faced grim reaper. Also, producer Martin Birch had a cameo in the clip as his face morphed with Maiden mascot Eddie. A newer version of the video features Flash animation by Camp Chaos spliced between the original footage, replacing McBrain and Birch's acting scenes and some of the '80s-style visual effects. The animation depicts Icarus fleeing away from a winged Eddie (as seen on the single cover).

== Track listing ==
7" Single

Side one
No.	Title	Writer(s)	Length
1.	"Flight of Icarus"	Adrian Smith, Bruce Dickinson	3:49

Side two
No.	Title	Writer(s)	Length
2.	"I've Got the Fire"	Ronnie Montrose	2:37

The B-side is a cover of Montrose's "I Got the Fire", from their 1974 album, Paper Money. Iron Maiden originally released a live cover of the song during the Paul Di'Anno era, on the 1980 single "Sanctuary", but the "Flight of Icarus" version features Bruce Dickinson on vocals and is a studio recording.

== Personnel ==
Production credits are adapted from the 7 inch vinyl cover.

Iron Maiden

- Bruce Dickinson – vocals
- Dave Murray – guitars
- Adrian Smith – guitars
- Steve Harris – bass guitar
- Nicko McBrain – drums

Production

- Martin Birch – producer, engineer
- Derek Riggs – cover illustration
- Simon Fowler – photography

== Charts ==
Single	Chart (1983)	Peak position	Album
"Flight of Icarus"	Australia (Kent Music Report)	93	Piece of Mind
"Flight of Icarus"	Irish Singles Chart	14	Piece of Mind
"Flight of Icarus"	UK Singles Chart	11	Piece of Mind
Single	Chart (1990)	Peak position	Album
"Flight Of Icarus / The Trooper"	UK Albums Chart (Note: Re-release of both singles as part of The First Ten Years box set. Exceeded the length limit of the UK Singles chart.)	7	—
