= Offerings =

Offerings may refer to:

- Offerings (film), a 1989 American slasher film
- Offerings (Typhoon album), 2018
- Offerings: A Worship Album, by Third Day, 2000
- Offerings, a 1998 album by Vas

== See also ==
- Offering (disambiguation)
