= Unclean animal =

Animal whose consumption or handling is taboo

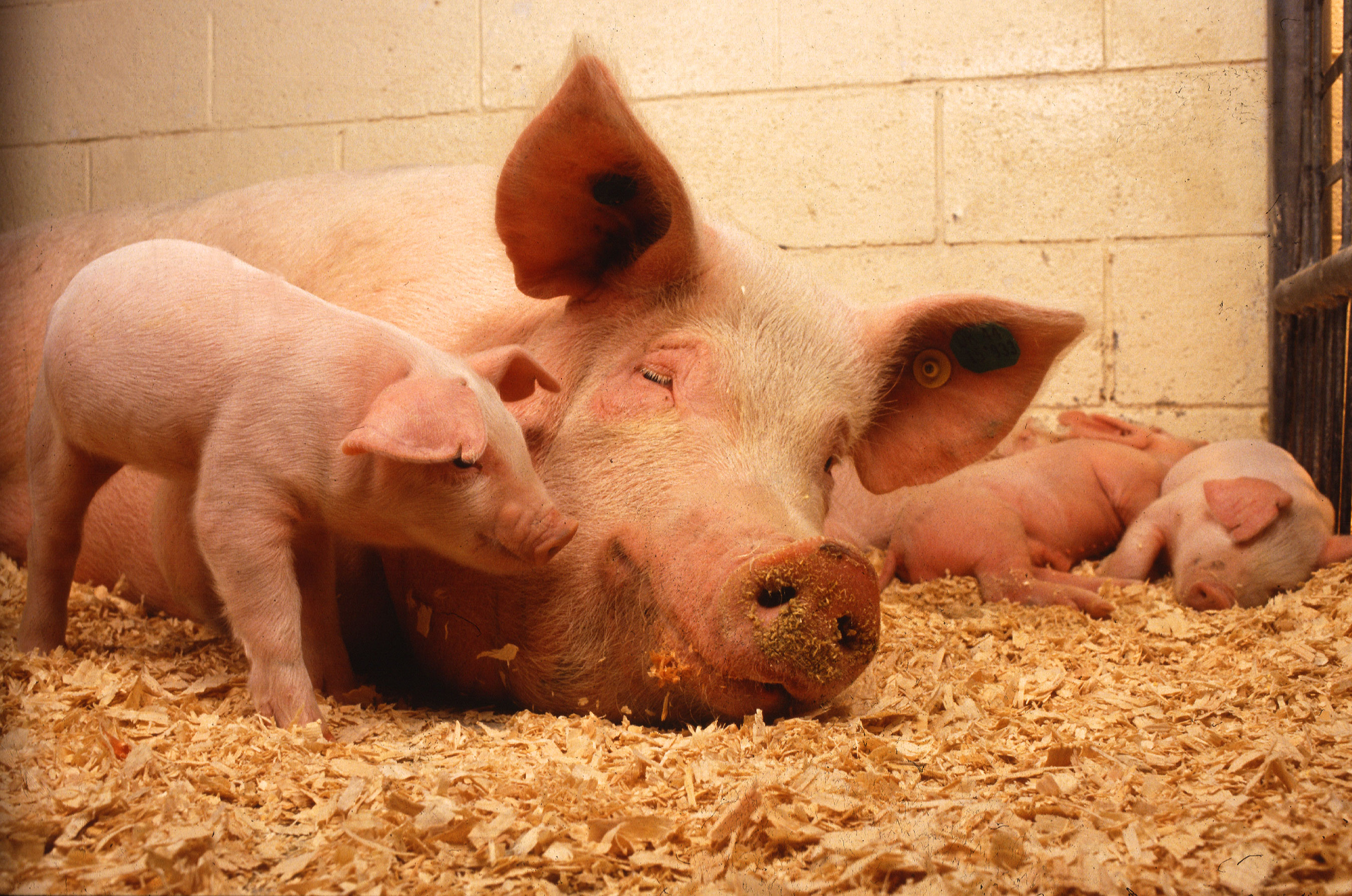
The pig is considered an unclean animal as food in Judaism and Islam, and some parts of Christianity.

In some Abrahamic religions, an unclean animal is an animal whose consumption or handling is taboo. According to these religions, people who handle such animals may need to ritually purify themselves to get rid of their uncleanliness.

== Judaism ==
In Judaism, the concept of "impure animals" plays a prominent role in the Kashrut, the part of Jewish law that specifies which foods are allowed (kosher) or forbidden to Jews. These laws are based upon the Books of Leviticus and Deuteronomy of the Torah and in the extensive body of rabbinical commentaries (the Talmud).

The distinction between clean and unclean animals is recognised in the Book of Genesis, where Noah is instructed to bring into the Ark all sorts "of pure beasts, and of beasts that are impure, and of fowls, and of every thing that creepeth upon the earth". He is directed to bring in seven pairs of each kind of clean animal, but only one pair of each kind of unclean animal. H. E. Ryle suggests that more clean animals than unclean were required "presumably, because they would be wanted (a) for food, (b) for sacrifice, and (c) for domestic purposes". Once the flood waters had receded, Noah's sacrificial offering consisted only of clean birds and animals.

In the Torah, some animals are explicitly named as pure or impure, while others are classified by anatomical characteristics or other criteria. In some cases, there is some doubt as to the precise meaning of the Biblical Hebrew animal name.

According to Jewish dietary laws, to be "pure" an animal must also be free from certain defects and must be slaughtered and cleaned according to specific regulations (Shechita).

Any product of an impure or improperly slaughtered animal is also non-kosher. Animal gelatin, for example, has been avoided, although recently kosher gelatin (from cows or from fish prepared according to kosher regulations) has become available; the status of shellac is controversial. The prohibitions also extend to certain parts of pure animals, such as blood, certain fat tissues, and the sciatic nerves.

Finally, it is forbidden to cook the meat of an animal in the milk or dairy product of that same animal, which has in turn led to the traditional practice of using separate complete sets of kitchen utensils for meat and dairy so as to totally ensure this rule is not broken.

=== Classification of animals ===
The Torah does not classify animals under modern scientific categories such as mammals, fish, reptiles, birds, etc. Rather, the religious categories are land-dwelling animals (land mammals, flightless birds, and land reptiles, etc.), flying animals (birds, insects, flying mammals such as bats), and given that each of these religious categories of animals includes species of at least two or more of each scientific categories of animals, there is no general kashrut rules relating per se to mammals, birds, reptiles, or fish. However, rules for each of these classes of animals can be extrapolated from the biblical requirements.

==== Mammals ====
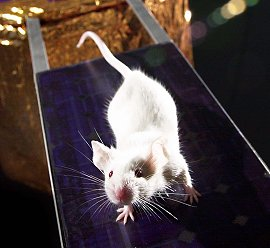
Mouse

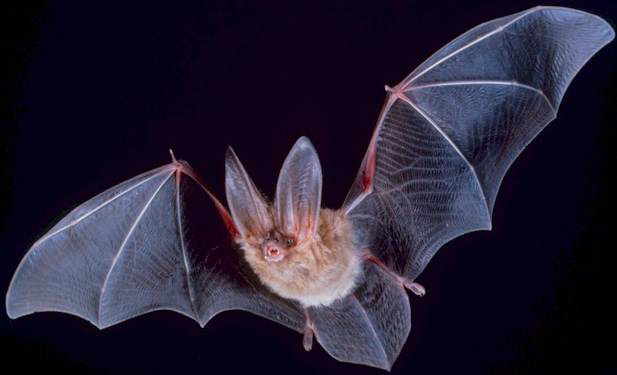
Townsend's big-eared bat

According to the Torah, land-dwelling animals that both chew their cud (ruminate) and have cloven hooves, are kosher.

By these requirements, any land-dwelling animal that is kosher can only possibly be a mammal, but even then, permitted are only those mammals that are placentals and strictly herbivorous (not omnivores nor carnivores) that both ruminate and also have cloven hooves, such as bovines (cattle/cows, bison, buffalos, yak, etc.), sheep, goats, deer, antelope, and giraffes; there is no tradition for the consumption of giraffe by any Jewish community.

All other mammals, land-dwelling or otherwise, are forbidden by the Torah, including "crawling creatures" such as mice, and flying mammals such as the various species of bats.

Also forbidden are water-bound mammals, such as whales, dolphins, seals, and dugongs, as they do not have the characteristics required of water-bound creatures to be kosher; the creature must possess both fins and scales to be kosher.

Land-dwelling mammals possessing only one of the two characteristics of kosher land-dwellers, such as the camel who ruminates but has no cloven hooves or the pig who possesses cloven hooves but does not ruminate, are not kosher. These two animals are cited explicitly.

Given these conditions, there is no kosher land-dwelling non-mammal.

==== Fish ====
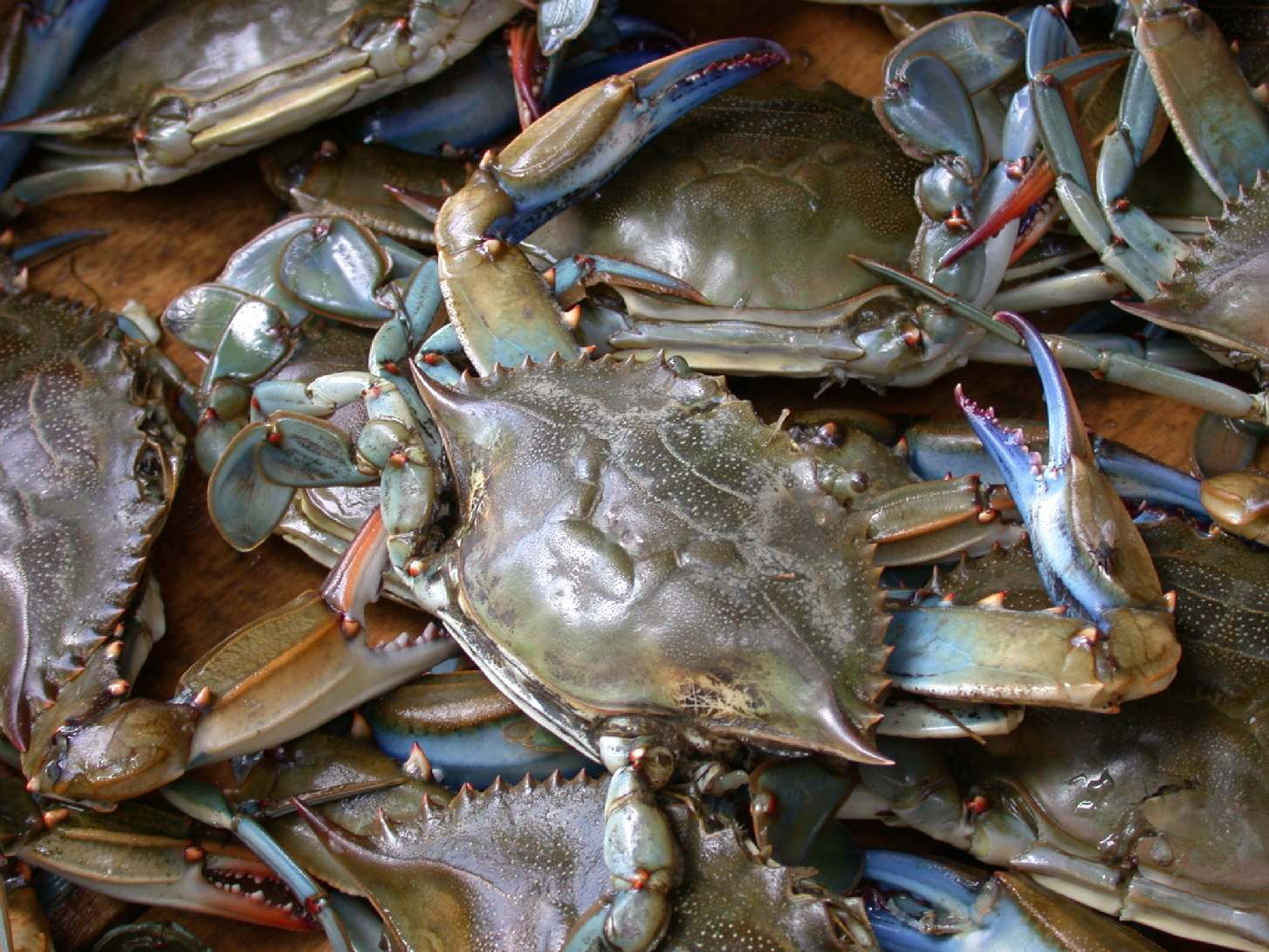
Blue crab for sale in Piraeus.

According to Leviticus 11:9–10, anything that comes from the water ("in the seas, and in the rivers") that has both fin and scales may be eaten. By these requirements, fish are the only possible kosher water-dwelling creatures. Because all creatures possessing both fins and scales also possess an endoskeleton and gills, any creature possessing lung or an exoskeleton is not kosher.

As every fish possessing scales also possesses fins, any water-dwelling creature possessing scales is kosher.

==== Birds ====
The Torah names only a few birds that may not be eaten; those not in the list are presumed to be kosher. However, the precise identity of the unclean birds is a matter of contention in traditional Jewish texts. It is therefore common to eat only birds with a clear masorah (tradition) of being kosher in at least one Jewish community, such as domestic fowl.

Leviticus 11 lists the non-kosher flying creatures. The Hebrew names listed are translated in the English Standard Version of the Bible as follows:

- Cormorant
- Eagle
- Gull
- Hawk
- Heron
- Hoopoe
- Red and Black Kite
- Osprey
- Owl (Horned, Screech, Little, White, and Desert)
- Raven
- Stork
- Vulture and Black Vulture
- Bats

==== Insects ====
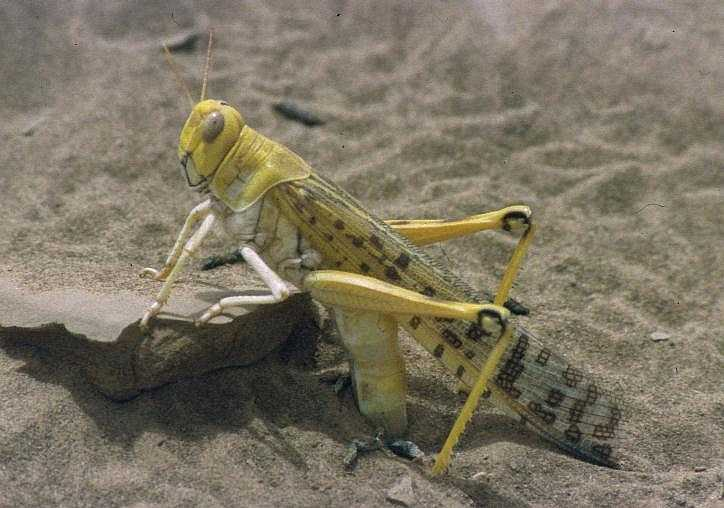
Desert locust

Leviticus 11:20–23 details which insects are not to be eaten, though all insects are considered impure to avoid mistaken consumption.

An exception is made for certain locusts (Schistocerca gregaria), which are traditionally considered kosher by some Yemenite Jewish communities.

Bees' honey is considered kosher as the honey is not made of bees.

=== Explicit list ===
The following animals are considered to be impure according to Leviticus 11 and Deuteronomy 14, based on Rashi's identification:

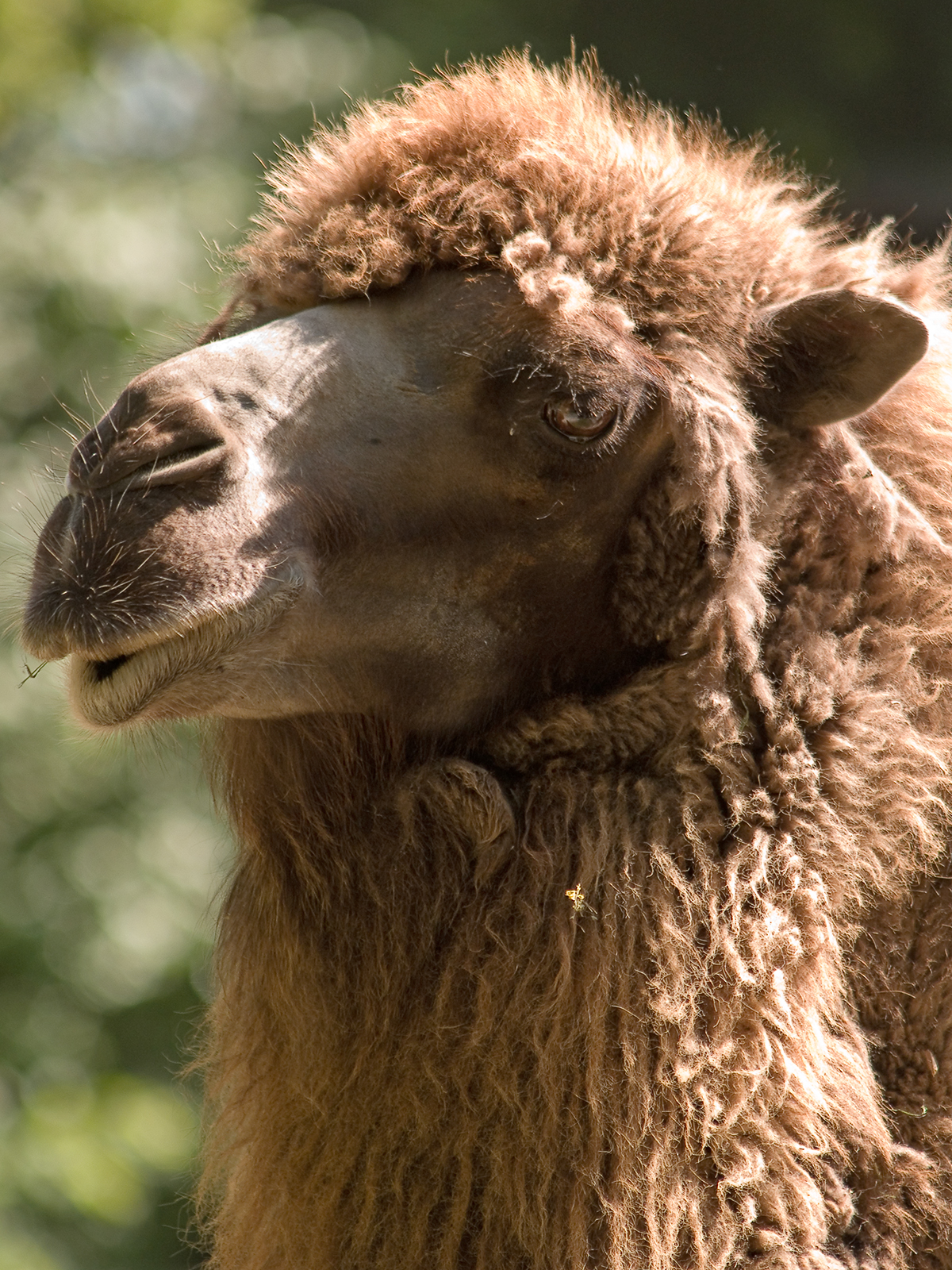
Camel

- Bat
- Camel
- Chameleon
- Coney (hyrax)
- Cormorant
- Cuckow (cuckoo)
- Eagle
- Ferret
- Frog
- Gier eagle
- Glede
- Great owl
- Hare
- Hawk
- Heron
- Kite
- Lapwing
- Little owl
- Lizard
- Mole
- Mouse
- Night hawk
- Osprey
- Ossifrage
- Owl
- Pelican
- Pig
- Raven
- Snail
- Stork
- Tortoise
- Vulture
- Weasel

=== Reasons ===
The Jewish concept of "unclean animals" arose out of public health concerns by community leaders, since, in the conditions of the times, some of those animals were indeed correlated with diseases.

British anthropologist Mary Douglas proposed that the "unclean" label had philosophical grounds, namely it was cast on foods that did not seem to fall neatly into any symbolic category. The pig, for example, was seen as an "ambiguous" creature, because it has cloven hooves like cattle, but does not chew cud.

== Christianity ==
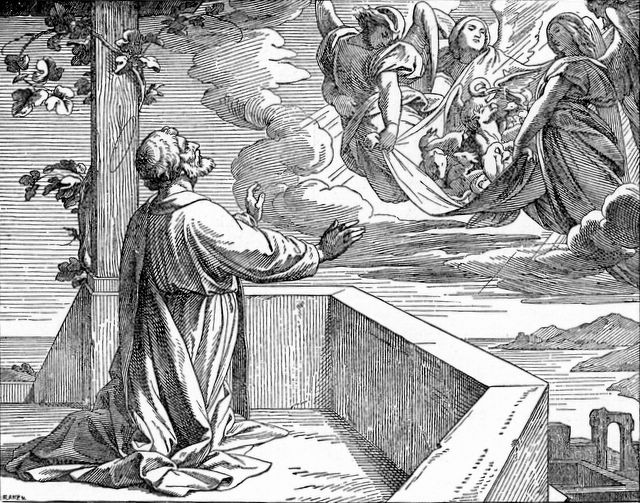
Peter's vision of a sheet with animals. Illustration from Treasures of the Bible, 1894.

In the very early days of Christianity it was debated if converts ought to follow Jewish customs (including circumcision and dietary laws) or not. According to the account of the Council of Jerusalem in Acts 15, a compromise was reached between those who wanted full compliance and those who favored a more liberal view. It was agreed that the converted Gentiles would have to bear "no greater burden than these necessary things: You must abstain from food sacrificed to idols, from blood, from the meat of strangled animals, and from sexual immorality. You will do well to avoid these things".

While the majority of Christians agree that the dietary restrictions of the Old Testament were lifted with Christ's New Covenant, a view known as supersessionism, there are Torah Observant Christians who believe that they should still be observed.

Some, like the Seventh-day Adventists, argue that the liberal view would imply the acceptance even of alcohol, tobacco, rats and roaches as "clean food"; and that God never declares something an abomination and then changes his mind.

Supporters of the stricter view have also disputed the interpretation of Peter's vision Acts 10:5–10, claiming that God was merely instructing him not to refer to Gentiles as "unclean" since salvation had been extended to them. This is expressly stated by Peter later in the chapter at Acts 10:28 ("but God hath shewed me that I should not call any man common or unclean.") In Acts 10:14 Peter makes a distinction between "common" (Greek: κοινόν, koinón) and "unclean" (Greek: ακάθαρτον, akátharton) to which God replies in the next verse "What God hath cleansed, that call not thou common [Greek: κοίνου, koínou]".

One modern example of a Torah-submissive group is the Seventh-day Adventist Church, whose co-founder Ellen G. White was a proponent of vegetarianism. Many Seventh-day Adventists avoid meat for health reasons, although vegetarianism is not a requirement. Members of the United Church of God as well as other Sabbath-keeping Churches also believe in not consuming the meat from unclean animals.

=== Seventh-day Adventist ===
Adventists are known for presenting a "health message" that advocates vegetarianism and expects adherence to the kosher laws, particularly the consumption of kosher foods described in Leviticus 11, meaning abstinence from pork, shellfish, and other animals proscribed as "unclean".

=== Ethiopian and Eritrean Orthodox Tewahedo Churches ===
Members of the Ethiopian and Eritrean Orthodox Tewahedo churches generally abstain from pork and other unclean meats; however, this is merely a cultural practice with no formal canons on the church prohibiting the consumption of unclean meats.

== Islam ==
In Islam several animals are considered unclean and their consumption is sinful (harām), except in case of necessity; while others are permitted (halāl), as long as they are slaughtered in the proper manner and with blessings given to God.

The Quran expressly forbids consumption of "the flesh of swine". There are no other "impure animals" explicitly named in the Qur'an. If someone converts to Islam, Allah "allows them as lawful what is good and prohibits them from what is bad; he releases them from their heavy burdens and from the yokes that were upon them".

For other animals, great importance is given to the manner of its death: forbidden are blood and carrion ("dead meat"), and any animal that has been "killed by strangling, or by a violent blow, or by a headlong fall, or by being gored to death". Also forbidden is any animal that has been eaten by a wild animal, unless the person is able to slaughter it before it dies.

Finally, the Qur'an forbids food which has been invoked by a name other than Allah, which has been sacrificed on stone altars, or has been subjected to the pagan practice of raffling with arrows. Food slaughtered by an idolater is forbidden, but food that is acceptable to Jews and Christians is allowed to Muslims as well.

=== Dogs ===
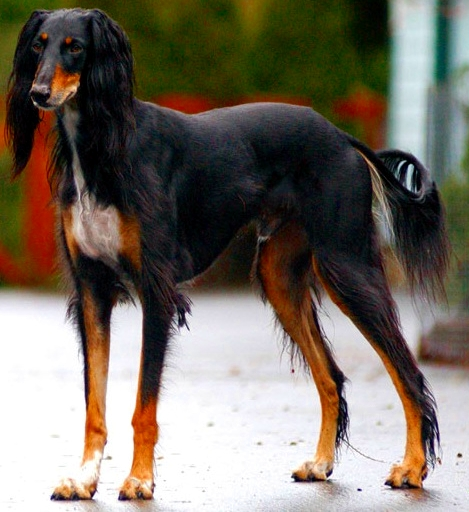
Saluki dog

According to the majority of Sunni scholars, dogs can be owned by farmers, hunters, and shepherds for the purpose of hunting and guarding and the Qur'an states that it is permissible to eat what trained dogs catch. Among the Bedouin, the saluki dogs are cherished as companions and allowed in the tents.

== See also ==
- Clostridial necrotizing enteritis
- Food and drink prohibitions
- Islam and cats
- Religious restrictions on the consumption of pork
- Trichinosis
