= Offering (Axe album) =

Studio album by Axe
- Released: 1982
- Recorded: Bee Jay Recording Studio, Orlando, Florida, USA.
- Genre: Hard rock; arena rock; power rock
- Length: 35:47
- Label: Atco
- Producer: Al Nalli

Axe chronology
Living on the Edge (1981)	Offering (1982)	Nemesis (1983)

Professional ratings
Review scores
Source	Rating
Allmusic	3/5 stars

Offering is the third studio album by the American hard rock band Axe, released by Atco Records in 1982. A remastered CD was released by Rock Candy Records in 2024

== Track listing ==
1. "Rock 'n' Roll Party in the Streets" ( Bobby Barth ) – 3:29
2. "Video Inspiration" ( B. Barth ) – (2:49)
3. "Steal Another Fantasy" ( B. Barth ) – (4:41)
4. "Jennifer" ( B. Barth, Edgar Riley, jr., Michael Osborne, Ted Mueller ) – (3:57)
5. "I Got the Fire" (Ronnie Montrose; Montrose cover) – (3:19)
6. "Burn the City Down" ( B. Barth ) – (4:46)
7. "Now or Never" ( B. Barth ) – (3:51)
8. "Holdin' On" ( B. Barth, E. Riley, M. Osborne ) – 2:54
9. "Silent Soldiers" ( B. Barth ) – 6:01

== Personnel ==
- Bobby Barth – lead guitar, lead vocals
- Mike Osbourne – rhythm guitar, backing vocals
- Edgar Riley – keyboards, backing vocals
- Wayne Haner – bass
- Teddy Mueller – drums

== Chart performance ==
=== Album ===
Chart (1982)	Peak position
US (Billboard 200)	81

=== Singles ===
Year	Single	Chart	Position
1982	"Rock 'n' Roll Party in the Streets"	Billboard Rock Tracks	23
1982	"Now or Never"	Billboard Hot 100	64
