= Shorty Medlocke =

American musician (1912–1982)

- Born: Paul Robert Medlock; July 20, 1912
- Origin: United States
- Died: August 6, 1982 (aged 70)
- Genres: Blues; country; bluegrass
- Occupations: Musician, songwriter
- Instruments: Harmonica, banjo, guitar
- Years active: 1969–1982
- Website: www.michaelherring.com/shorty

Shorty Medlocke (born Paul Robert Medlock, July 20, 1912 – August 6, 1982) was an American blues, country and bluegrass musician and banjo player. He is the grandfather of Rickey Medlocke of the Southern rock bands Blackfoot and Lynyrd Skynyrd. Despite his stage name "Medlocke", his real surname officially is spelled without an "e" on the end.

Starting in 1969, Shorty made contributions to Blackfoot's music. He wrote the Top 40 hit "Train, Train" (released on the album Strikes), and played harmonica on the track. For the follow-up album Tomcattin', Shorty co-wrote the song "Fox Chase" and gave the song a short introduction. For Marauder, Shorty co-wrote "Rattlesnake Rock 'n' Roller" and played banjo on the track. Shorty had also appeared on Blackfoot's 1975 debut album, No Reservations, singing a version of "Railroad Man" (which he also wrote). Shorty Medlocke was also one of the inspirations for the song "Ballad of Curtis Loew" by Lynyrd Skynyrd.
