= Sur offering =

A sur offering (Sanskrit: homa) is a Tibetan Buddhist practice in which a mixture of flour, sweets and dairy products, sometimes with additional valuable or aromatic substances, is consecrated and placed in a fire or burned as incense. The resulting fragrant smoke is offered to the objects of refuge and shared with all sentient beings.

Tiny, high-pitched cymbals called tingshas may be struck while the offering is burned; these call sentient beings, especially hungry ghosts (pretas), to share it and satisfy their hunger. Partaking of this blessing purifies their karma and allows them to pass on to a blessed rebirth.

The practice may be long or short, as time and circumstances allow, and generally does not require initiation from a lama. The merit of the practice is dedicated to the benefit of deceased persons or animals, especially during the 49 days after death, during which they are believed to be in the bardo state. Sur offerings may also be done to dispel negative or harmful influences, such as ghosts.
