= Strikes (album) =

Studio album by Blackfoot
- Released: March 7, 1979
- Studio: Subterranean Studio (Ann Arbor, MI); Sound Suite Studios (Detroit, MI); Bee Jay Studios (Orlando, FL)
- Genre: Southern rock; hard rock; blues rock
- Length: 33:41
- Label: Atco
- Producer: Al Nalli; Henry Weck

Blackfoot chronology
Flyin' High (1976)	Strikes (1979)	Tomcattin' (1980)

Singles from Strikes
- 1. "Highway Song" Released: 1979; 2. "Train, Train" Released: 1979

Professional ratings
Review scores
Source	Rating
AllMusic	4.5/5 stars
Classic Rock	3.5/5 stars
The Rolling Stone Album Guide	3.5/5 stars

Strikes is the third studio album by the American Southern rock band Blackfoot. It was released on March 7, 1979, through Atco Records. Recording sessions took place at Subterranean Studios in Ann Arbor, at Sound Suite Studios in Detroit, and at Bee Jay Studios in Orlando. Production was handled by Henry Weck and Al Nalli.

The album debuted at number 183 on the Billboard 200 and later reached number 42. On April 18, 1986, it received a Platinum certification status by the Recording Industry Association of America.

It features two singles: "Highway Song", which reached number 26 on the Billboard Hot 100, and "Train, Train", which reached number 38.

== Track listing ==
No.	Title	Writer(s)	Length
1.	"Road Fever"	Rickey Medlocke	3:07
2.	"I Got a Line on You" (Spirit cover)	Randy Craig Wolfe	3:17
3.	"Left Turn on a Red Light"	R. Medlocke; Jakson Spires	4:35
4.	"Pay My Dues" (Blues Image cover)	Blues Image	3:03
5.	"Baby Blue"	R. Medlocke; Spires; Charlie Hargrett	2:33
6.	"Wishing Well" (Free cover)	Paul Rodgers; Paul Kossoff; Tetsu Yamauchi; John Bundrick; Simon Kirke	3:11
7.	"Run and Hide"	R. Medlocke; Spires	3:24
8.	"Train, Train"	Shorty Medlocke	3:32
9.	"Highway Song"	R. Medlocke; Spires	7:00 / 7:31 ^
Total length:			33:10 / 33:41

^The original album version of "Highway Song" was approximately 7 minutes long; later remastered versions of the album feature the song with an extended fade-out, lengthening it to 7:31 (this latter version was also featured on the band's Rattlesnake Rock 'N Roll Greatest Hits album).

== Personnel ==
Band members

- Rickey Medlocke – lead vocals, guitar
- Charlie Hargrett – guitar
- Greg T. Walker – bass, backing vocals
- Jakson Spires – drums, backing vocals

Additional personnel

- Pat McCaffrey – keyboards
- Shorty Medlocke – harmonica (track 8 – prelude)
- Michael "Cub" Koda – harmonica (track 8)
- Donna D. Davis – backing vocals
- Pamela T. Vincent – backing vocals
- Cynthia M. Douglas – backing vocals
- David L. Weck a.k.a. Henry "H-Bomb" Weck – percussion, recording engineer, producer
- Al Nalli – producer

== Charts ==
Chart (1979)	Peak position
US Billboard 200	42

== Certifications ==
Region	Certification	Certified units/sales
United States (RIAA)	Platinum	1,000,000^{^}
^{^} Shipments figures based on certification alone.
