= Bobby Barth =

American singer-songwriter (born 1952)

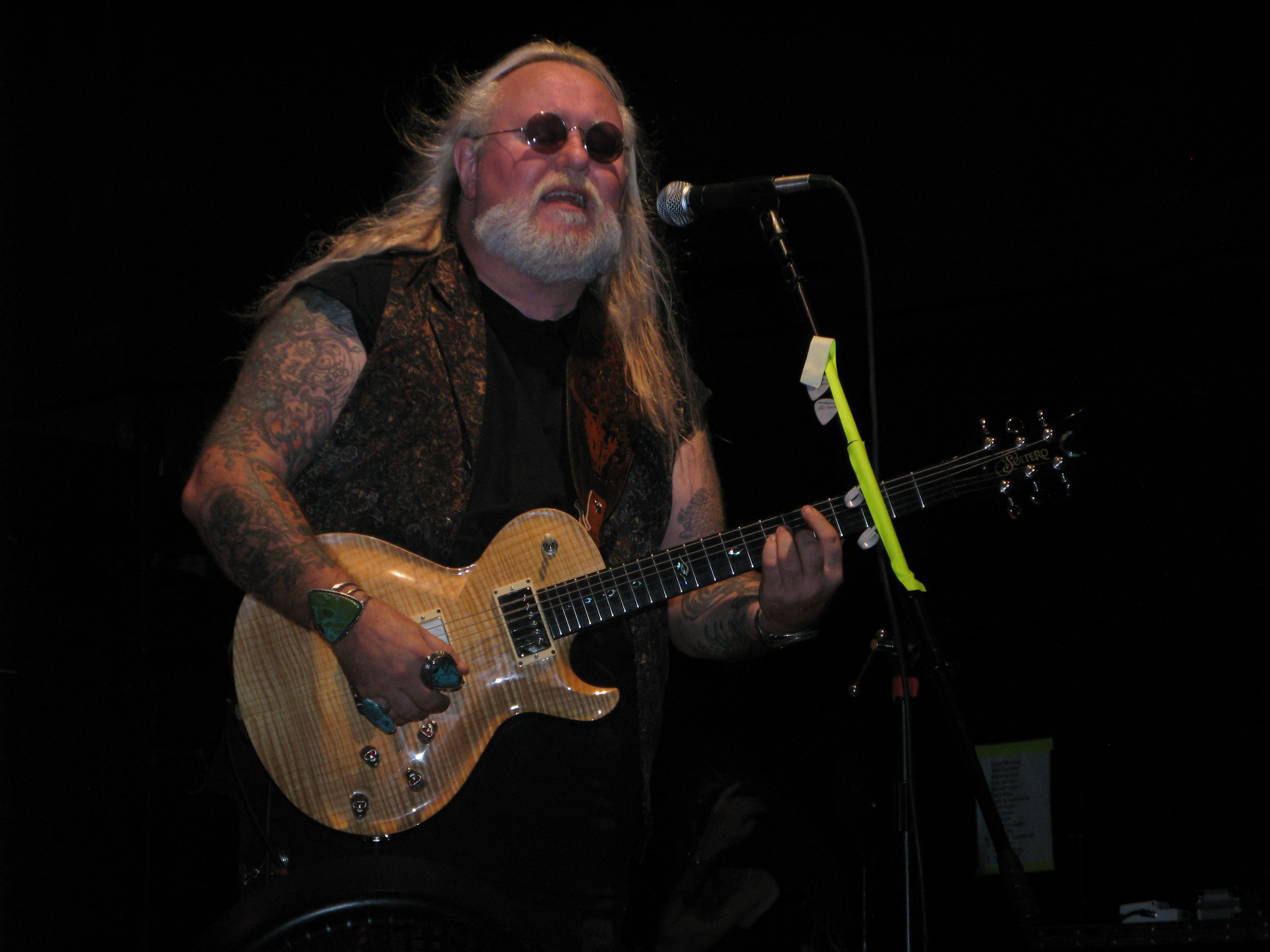
- Barth performing with Blackfoot in 2008.

Background information
- Born: December 5, 1952 (age 73); Coffeyville, Kansas
- Genres: Southern rock Hard rock
- Occupation: Musician
- Instruments: Vocals, guitar, drums
- Years active: 1969–present

Bobby Barth (born December 5, 1952, in Coffeyville, Kansas, United States) is an American singer, songwriter, record producer and guitarist. As a player, Barth is most known for his emotional melodic style and his slide work.

== Education ==
Barth attended St. John's Military School in Salina, Kansas, and finished his formal education at Fountain-Fort Carson High School in Fountain, Colorado. He began playing drums in 1960, working weekend and one-night shows in 1963. Barth learned guitar basics from his stepfather, and in 1968 he left home and began to play music full-time.

== Music career ==
Barth joined the Colorado group Wakefield in 1969, as lead guitarist and singer. Wakefield was made up of Pueblo, Colorado, natives Charlie Ferrill on drums, Carl Marcon on bass, Mike Carrol on trumpet, Ron Struthers on sax and flute and San Francisco native Paul Zamucen on congas and timbales. The band performed in clubs across the country until parting company around 1973.

Barth launched Babyface around the same time, with Colorado drummer Bobby Miles, California bassist Mike Turpin, and Wisconsin keyboardist Edgar Riley Jr. This band went through a few member changed and recorded their first and only record for now-defunct ASI Records. Although the band felt betrayed by the producer, who changed the direction of the record after the band left the studio, the record produced a top 20 song on the Billboard A/C charts. The band, which considered itself to be a cerebral rock band, but was stuck performing for crowds that expected to hear its top 20 hit, was forced to disband in 1978.

After a short time Barth, Turpin and Riley joined forces with guitarist Michael Osborne and drummer Teddy Mueller to reform the Babyface concept without the intrusion of ASI Records and emerged in Gainesville, Florida, as Alien. In 1979, MCA Records penned a deal with pop music label Curb Records to form a company that would co-produce rock bands. Alien was the first band to sign with the MCA-Curb label and after a quick name change to Axe, —due to the release of the motion picture Alien— gave birth to two records, Axe and Living on the Edge. Barth recounts that both records were a poor representation of the band (despite the song "Battles" being played by album-oriented rock stations), due to their lack of studio experience and "dreadful" choice of producers. After the industry-wide bloodbath of 1980, like so many other bands, Axe found itself without a label. Working with Roger Probert of Atlantic Records, the band set a deal with Atlantic. Details are confusing, but overnight the band managed by Jim Dawson and Arnakata Management and produced by Thom Allom of Judas Priest, found itself on Atco Records instead of Atlantic, with a new manager and producer. Albums produced under that contract included Offering and Nemesis. Offering brought the band to the attention of American radio, with "Rock and Roll Party in the Streets", when the single, without any real support from Atco, made the Billboard Top 100 songs for their year ending charts, and the album making the Billboard top 75 albums of the year chart, both for 1981.

The band continued to tour and record, until in 1984 Osborne and Barth were involved in a fatal car crash. Barth escaped with only spinal injuries, but Osborne was killed in the crash. Barth recorded his solo record, Two Hearts One Beat, as a tribute to Osborne in 1985.

Barth joined Blackfoot, another Atco/Nalli band, in 1984 after recovering from the crash. He played with Blackfoot until their breakup in 1986. After the breakup of Blackfoot, Bobby continued to tour with Blackfoot's Ricky Medlocke until leaving in late 1986. Barth moved back to Los Angeles and partnered with UFO drummer Andy Parker to open Satellite Sound Recording in Burbank. Barth started to engineer and produce projects with the help of the producer of his solo record 2 Hearts, Was Not Was bassist Bruce Nazarian. The two became involved with writing and producing for major films until, in 1990, Barth was recruited to play guitar for Angry Anderson. After recording Angry's record Blood From Stone, Barth moved to Australia to tour with Anderson. The record garnered two top 10 hits and a tour with Aerosmith. Upon Barth's return to the USA, he and his wife left Los Angeles and moved to Denver, and started NEH Records. Barth produced several records for MTM, Toshiba-EMI, and Japan's Zero Corporation Label, as well as countless indie projects. In mid-2001, Barth and his business partner Michael McPherson separated the label's retail sales from the studio and Barth moved the studio to New Orleans.

In 2004, the original members of Blackfoot (minus Medlocke) asked Barth to reunite and to tour again. From 2004 till 2010, Barth and Blackfoot were touring, with Barth fronting the band. He left in late 2010. In 2012 an anthology of his work covering seven CDs with Axe was released on Cleopatra records, titled Axeology followed by a 4 cd set of the first four axe records “Axe” “Living on the Edge” “Offering” and “Nemesis”. In June 2012, the final Axe show was filmed on their 35 anniversary and released as a DVD/CD package called Axe Live 2012 on the NEH Record label. Barth went into semi retirement in 2015 moving his family and studio to Lafayette County, Florida. On September 20, 2019, the release of Axe the Final Offering on Escape Music was made and is rumored to be the last Axe recording, making a total of 12 records spanning over 40 years.

== Other interests ==
Although a working musician all his life, Barth says his greatest accomplishment was receiving the Colorado Master of the Year Award in 1998 while serving as the Worshipful Master of Denver Lodge No. 5, Colorado's oldest Masonic Lodge. He continues to be active in Freemasonry and in the rebuilding of New Orleans. He is also Vice President and a founding member of the Louisiana Grand Chapter of the "Widows Sons" motorcycle Riding Assoc. Barth is also currently an honorary member of the Alabama Widows Sons Masonic Riders Association in Montgomery, Alabama.
