= Danick Vandale =

Canadian cyclist

Personal information
- Born: 12 July 1995 (age 31) Canada
- Height: 5 ft 7 in (1.70 m)
- Weight: 63 kg (139 lb; 9.9 st)

Cycling career
- Sport: Cycling
- Disciplines: Road and Track
- Role: Rider
- Rider type: All-Rounder

Professional team
- 2015: H&R Block Pro Cycling

Danick Vandale is a Canadian bicycle racer, currently with the H&R Block Pro Cycling team.
