= Blackfoot (band) =

American Southern rock band

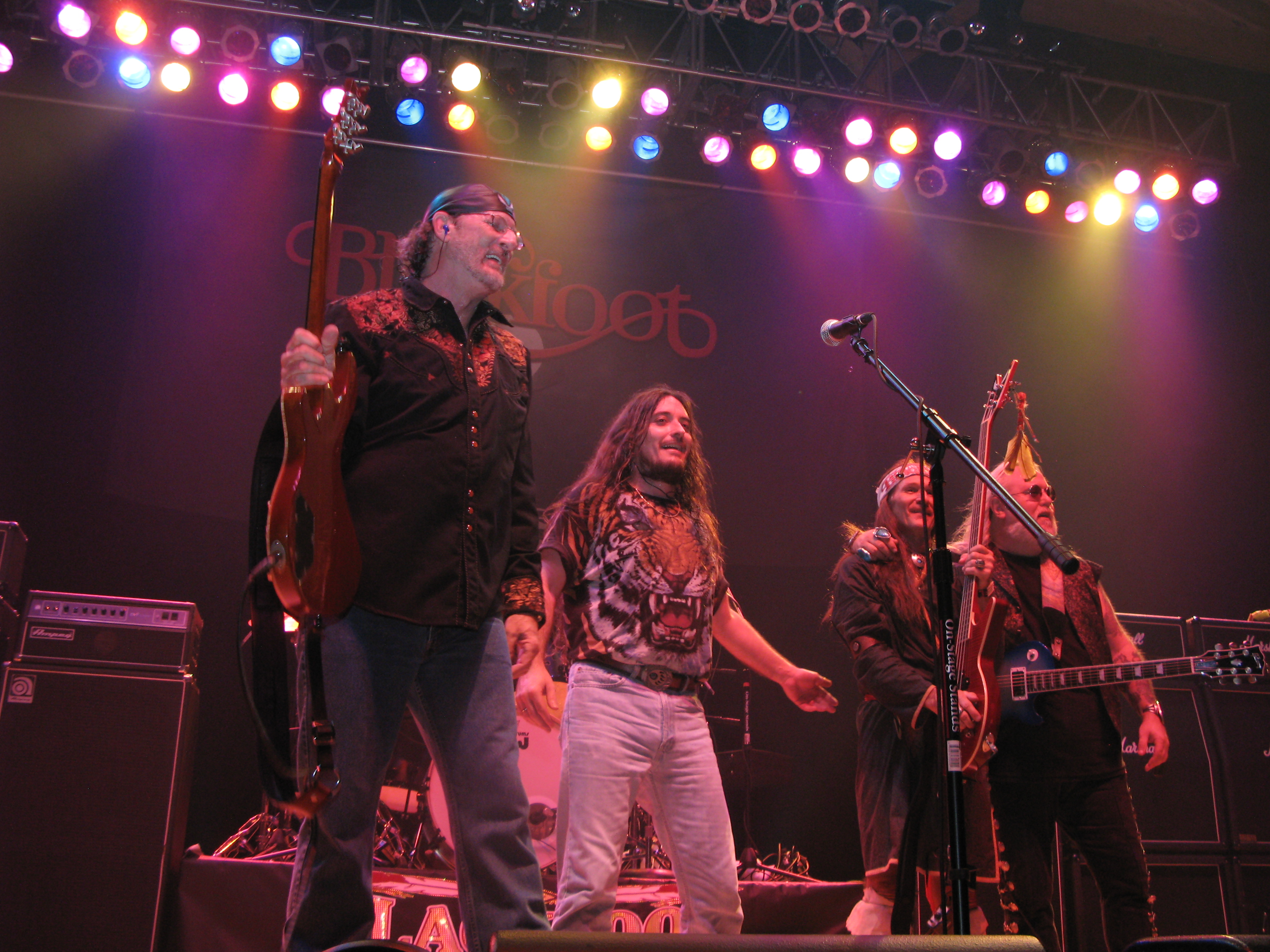
- Blackfoot at Penn's Peak, Pennsylvania, 2008

Background information
- Also known as: Rick Medlocke and Blackfoot; Fresh Garbage; Hammer
- Origin: Jacksonville, Florida, U.S.
- Genres: Hard rock; southern rock
- Years active: 1970–1997, 2004–present
- Labels: Island; Epic; Atco; Atlantic; Music for Nations; Wildcat!; Bullet Proof

Blackfoot is an American Southern rock band from Jacksonville, Florida, formed in 1970. Though they primarily play with a Southern rock style, they are also known as a hard rock act. The band's classic lineup consisted of guitarist and vocalist Rickey Medlocke, guitarist Charlie Hargrett, bassist Greg T. Walker and drummer Jakson Spires.

They had a number of successful albums during the 1970s and early 1980s, including Strikes (1979), Tomcattin' (1980) and Marauder (1981).

== History ==
=== Early years ===
During the spring of 1969, Rickey Medlocke and Greg T. Walker met New York City natives Ron Sciabarasi and Charlie Hargrett in Jacksonville and organized the band "Fresh Garbage" (named after the like titled song from California psychedelic rock act Spirit), featuring Medlocke on drums and vocals, Walker on bass, Hargrett on guitar and Sciabarasi on keyboards. They played most of their shows at The Comic Book Club on Forsyth Street.

That autumn, Fresh Garbage dissolved following the departure of Sciabarasi, who was drafted and sent to Vietnam. However, Medlocke, Walker and Hargrett regrouped and formed the band "Hammer", with Medlocke switching to vocalist/guitarist and with new recruits Jakson Spires (drums; born on April 12, 1951, died on March 16, 2005), DeWitt Gibbs (keyboards) and Jerry Zambito (guitars, who only stayed briefly) joining the band. Gibbs, Zambito and Spires had previously played together in Tangerine, while Spires and Walker had been in a high school group called the Rocking Aces. They soon relocated to Gainesville, Florida, to be the house band of Dub's Steer Room, a well-known topless bar on the outskirts of town.

At the beginning of 1970, the band relocated to Manhattan after a friend, Nancy O'Connor who was working in a music publishing company, told her boss about the band and he had them move to New York City.

During the early spring of the same year, the band, after learning of another band on the West Coast named Hammer, decided to change their name to Blackfoot to represent the American Indian heritage of its members: Jakson Spires (from Oklahoma) had a Cheyenne/French father and a Cherokee mother; Rickey Medlocke's father was Lakota Sioux and Blackfoot Indian, and his mother's side is Creek/Cherokee, Scottish and Irish; Greg "Two Wolf" Walker is part Eastern (Muskogee) Creek, a tribe recognized by the state of Florida, but not federally. Charlie Hargrett was the only white man of the original, classic line-up.

When the band failed to acquire a contract as a result of their relocation, Gibbs quit the band and Medlocke began playing rhythm guitar full-time.

During the spring of 1971, Medlocke and Walker accepted an offer to join Lynyrd Skynyrd and Blackfoot ended for a time. Still in New Jersey, Charlie Hargrett played briefly in "No Name" a band formed around him. They rehearsed at Steve Bondy's Family Home nearby in Morristown and included New Jersey locals Steve Bondy on guitar, Bert Carey on bass and Andy Peebles on drums. "No Name" played covers as well as original songs briefly in Budd Lake & Stanhope, New Jersey.

There was a brief attempt to regroup as Blackfoot during 1972, but Medlocke bowed out again and Walker and Gibbs got together with others in a new band named Rainbow to do some demos in Atlanta. But when this didn't lead anywhere, Rainbow splintered and Walker relocated to New York to join the band Cross Country for a short period. Hargrett remained in the north, living in Hackettstown, New Jersey.

During August 1972, Blackfoot's old friend and roadie, John Vassiliou, visited Hargrett with Reidsville, North Carolina bassist Leonard Stadler from the band Blackberry Hill. Hargrett decided to relocate to North Carolina and invited Medlocke, who had left Lynyrd Skynyrd by this time, to reform Blackfoot with Stadler on bass guitar and Spires returning as drummer. Danny Johnson (later with the bands Derringer and Steppenwolf), from a Louisiana group, Axis, was employed as second guitarist. But Medlocke soon decided to be both main vocalist and guitarist again, and so Johnson's tenure with the band was brief.

During the summer of 1973, Stadler quit the band after a tumor was discovered on one of his lungs. It later dissolved, but Stadler decided to leave secular music to join a gospel group. He eventually became a Methodist minister. Greg T. Walker was invited to rejoin at this juncture.

By 1974, the band had returned their base of operations to the Northeast (Northern New Jersey) and Medlocke developed nodes on his vocal cords and temporarily lost his voice. Another singer, Patrick Jude, was brought into the band. But after a brief time, Medlocke was able to sing again and Jude was dismissed. Soon afterward, Medlocke and Walker sent producers/session players Jimmy Johnson and David Hood a copy of Blackfoot's material. Johnson and Hood had worked with Medlocke and Walker in Muscle Shoals, Alabama when they were there recording with Lynyrd Skynyrd.

No Reservations was released by the company Island Records in September 1975 as part of a deal organized by Blackfoot's then manager Lou Manganiello, and their second record album, Flyin' High, was released by Epic Records company in December 1976. Both record albums were produced by Johnson and Hood.

=== Mid-1970s ===
By late 1975, the group was living back in Gainesville, Florida. During 1977, they communicated with Black Oak Arkansas' manager, Butch Stone, who hired them as the backing group for one of his clients, Ruby Starr, who had been a backup singer for Black Oak but was now becoming self-employed. After the stint with Ruby ended during 1978, they met Brownsville Station manager Al Nalli and his partner Jay Frey, who got them a contract with Atco Records.

Strikes, produced by Al Nalli and engineered by Brownsville Station drummer Henry Weck, was recorded in Nalli's basement studio in Ann Arbor, Michigan and was completed by January 1979. It was destined to be the band's most commercially successful effort. The song "Train, Train", written by Rickey's grandfather, "Shorty" Medlocke, became their first success and best known song. "Highway Song" proved to be another success for them later that year.

The group toured frequently during 1979; at the end of that year, on December 7th, they opened for the band The Who at the Silverdome in Pontiac, Michigan, while developing their next album, Tomcattin, which was released in June 1980. They went on to release the album Marauder in July 1981 and Highway Song Live (taken from a show the band played in Zurich, Switzerland on 3/26/82) in June 1982.

=== 1980s ===
During the early 1980s, the "Southern rock" genre was considered passe by the pop music press, so the band began attempting to change their style somewhat. They decided to add keyboards to the group once again. Organist Ken Hensley (ex-Uriah Heep) was contacted and agreed to join during 1982 in time for their next record album, Siogo (May 1983). But the poor sales for Siogo had the band thinking they might have to "modernize" for the new MTV generation. It was also thought that perhaps Hargrett with his "biker type" appearance might not be appropriate for television. Hargrett angrily and reluctantly decided to end his employment with the band during January 1984, having not played on their next album, Vertical Smiles, which had been recorded in Atlanta in late 1983 with former Yes band's engineer Eddy Offord. This album was rejected by Atco. But the revamped version, which was finally released in October 1984, also failed to sell well.

Ken Hensley, no longer accustomed to Blackfoot's intense tour schedule, quit by late 1984 and was replaced by former Axe band's singer/guitarist Bobby Barth. But by December 1985, with their popularity waning and good-quality engagements becoming few, the band decided to quit. During February 1986 the Blackfoot company was dissolved. Medlocke decided to continue with a new team that included Doug "Bingo" Bare (keyboards, synthetics, backup vocals, ex-Whiteface), Jerry "Wizzard" Seay (bass, backing vocals, from Mother's Finest) and Harold Seay (drums, percussion). For their album Rick Medlocke and Blackfoot (April 1987, their final album for Atlantic Records), the new group was attempting a more radio-style 1980s rock music sound. Jeff Stevens played bass guitar for one track.

During 1988, Wizzard and Seay quit and Gunner Ross (drums, percussion, ex-Ted Nugent), bassist Mark Mendoza (formerly of Twisted sister) and Neal Casal (guitar) were employed. Mendoza quit by the end of the year and Rikki Mayr (ex-Lizzy Borden band) began playing bass for the band during early 1989.

=== 1990s ===
During 1990, a new album, Medicine Man, was released by the independent Loop company.

By 1992, Medlocke had revamped the team yet again and hired three other players: guitarist Mark Woerpel (former front man for the band Warp Drive out of Milwaukee, who had also done some studio work for Medlocke for earlier albums), Benny Rappa (drums, percussion, a former Whiteface player) and Tim Stunson on bass guitar. Another new album, After the Reign, was released during 1994 by the company Wildcat and, like Medicine Man, had something of the band's old style. Also during 1994, the Rhino Records collection Rattlesnake Rock N' Roll: The Best of Blackfoot was released.

By 1996, Blackfoot was: Medlocke, drummer Stet Howland, John Housley (from Ragady Ann) for lead and rhythm guitar and Bryce Barnes (from Edwin Dare) for bass guitar. That same year, Medlocke rejoined Lynyrd Skynyrd, this time as a guitarist. But he continued to tour with Blackfoot honoring all dates booked through 1997, then disbanded the group to concentrate on Lynyrd Skynyrd.

Live On The King Biscuit Flower Hour, a 1983 concert recording, was released during early 1998, and EMI released Live during 2000, also culled from the band's heyday.

=== 2004–2011 ===
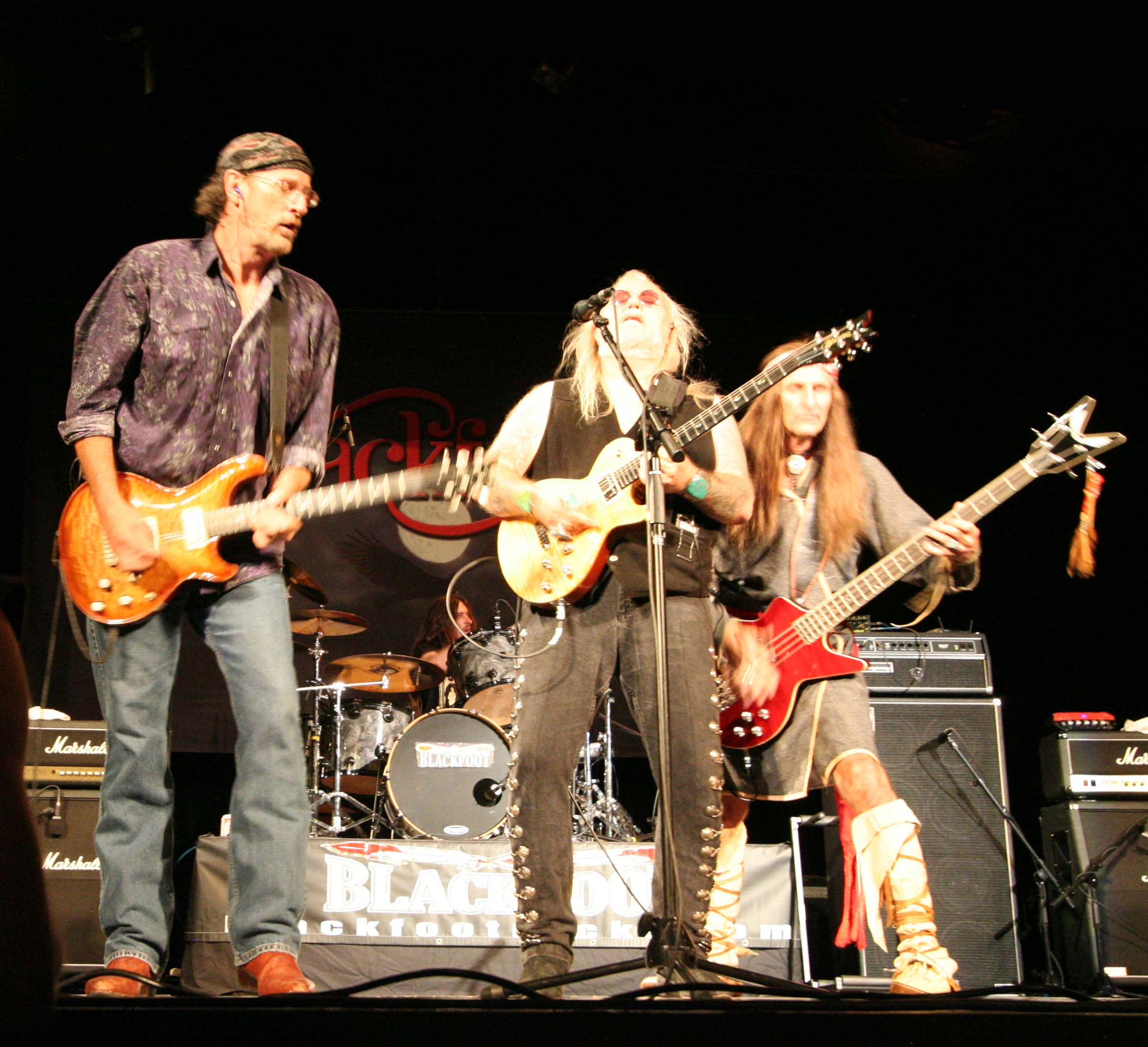
Blackfoot performing in 2008

During 2004 a second resurrection of Blackfoot occurred with original members Jakson Spires, Greg T. Walker and Charlie Hargrett. Medlocke was not available, so the lead vocals role was given to Bobby Barth (band member of Axe). Spires died suddenly on March 16, 2005, at age 53, of an aneurysm, but the band decided to persevere. In compliance with the will of Spires, Austrian drummer Christoph Ullmann was hired as the new drummer.

During 2006, the band toured and was joined by Skinny Molly's Jay Johnson (the son of Jimmy Johnson, their original co-producer) for guitar and vocals after Barth was sidelined for a shoulder and neck operation. Barth resumed performing later that year, as Johnson stayed on for a short time. During November 2006, Ullman left to return to Austria and was succeeded by Mark McConnell. In April 2007 Blackfoot dismissed Johnson and McConnell. That year the band toured and consisted of bassist Walker, Hargrett, Barth and drummer Michael Sollars. Later that year a live DVD was released. In 2009 Scott Craig was employed as drummer to succeed Sollars.

During the spring of 2010, Barth was forced to undergo emergency back surgery. Former Lynyrd Skynyrd guitarist Mike Estes and current vocalist/guitarist for Skinny Molly was then employed for lead vocals/guitar and Kurt Pietro (drummer of Skinny Molly) replaced Scott Craig on drums. In the summer of 2011 Charlie Hargrett was replaced by Randy Peak.

=== 2012–2015 ===
In 2012 Rickey Medlocke reformed Blackfoot with a completely new line-up (see Members below), with him acting as their producer.

Walker, Hargrett, Estes and Pietro subsequently regrouped under the band name Fired Guns. Then in 2015, Walker, Hargrett, Barth and Ullman began performing together again under the band name Warrior's Pride. Medlocke continued to perform with Lynyrd Skynyrd and Walker eventually formed a new band called Two Wolf by the end of the decade.

=== 2016-present ===
On August 5, 2016, Blackfoot released their first album in 20 years, Southern Native. The video for the song and samples were released on August 2, 2016, via regular channels and social media.

Since the new lineup's first appearance in 2012, there have been constant shuffles in personnel. And since 2023, Medlocke has been making it a point to appear at more of the band's concerts, alongside former 90s member Mark Woerpel.

== Band members ==
=== Current ===
- Rickey Medlocke – lead vocals, rhythm guitar (1970–1971, 1972–1974, 1974–1977, 1978–1997, 2023–present), lead guitar (1982–1988), dobro (1972–1984)
- Mark Weorpel – lead guitar, keyboards, vocals (1992–1996, 2023-present)
- Mark Westlund – guitar (2023–present)
- Johnny Keyte – bass (2023–present)
- Steve Soderstrom – drums (2023–present)
- Stacy Michelle - backing vocals (2023-present)

=== Former ===
- Greg T. Walker – bass, backing vocals (1970–1971, 1973–1986, 2004–2011), keyboards (1970–1971, 1973–1986, 2004–2011)
- Charlie Hargrett – lead guitar (1970–1971, 1972–1984, 2004–2011), rhythm guitar (1969)
- Jakson Spires – drums, backing vocals (1970–1971, 1972–1986, 2004–2005; died 2005)
- Dewitt Gibbs – keyboards, backing vocals (1970)
- Leonard Stadler – bass (1972–1973; died 2012)
- Danny Johnson – lead guitar (1972)
- Patrick Jude – lead vocals (1974)
- Ken Hensley – keyboards, rhythm guitar, backing vocals (1982–1984; died 2020)
- Bobby Barth – keyboards, rhythm guitar, lead vocals (1984–1986; 2004–2006, 2006–2010)
- Doug "Bingo" Bare – keyboards, backing vocals (1986–1992)
- Jerry "Wizzard" Seay – bass, backing vocals (1986–1988)
- Harold Seay – drums (1986–1988)
- Gunner Ross — drums (1988–1992; died 2021)
- Neal Casal – lead guitar (1988–1992; died 2019)
- Mark Mendoza – bass (1988)
- Rikki Mayr – bass, backing vocals (1989–1992)
- Tim Stunson – bass (1992–1996)
- Benny Rappa – drums (1992–1994)
- Stet Howland – drums (1994–1997)
- John Housley – lead guitar (1996–1997)
- Bryce Barnes – bass (1996–1997)
- Christoph Ullmann – drums (2005–2006)
- Jay Johnson – lead vocals, rhythm guitar (2006–2007)
- Tommy Krash – lead guitar (2008)
- Mark McConnell – drums (2006–2007; died 2012)
- Michael Sollars – drums (2007–2009)
- Scott Craig – drums (2009–2010)
- Mike Estes – lead vocals, rhythm guitar (2010–2011)
- Kurt Pietro – drums (2010–2011)
- Randy Peak – lead guitar (2011)
- Christopher Williams – drums, backing vocals (2012)
- Brian Carpenter – bass (2012–2017)
- Philip Shouse – lead vocals, rhythm guitar (2012)
- Matt Anastasi – drums, backing vocals (2012–2019)
- Sean Chambers – lead vocals, rhythm guitar (2012–2014)
- Jeremy Thomas – lead vocals, rhythm guitar (2014–2016)
- Rick Krasowski – lead vocals, rhythm guitar (2016–2017)
- Derek DeSantis – bass, backing vocals (2017–2019)
- Pierson Whicker – drums (2019)
- Tommy Scott – bass (2019)
- Jeff Shields – guitar, vocals (2020)
- Tim Rossi – guitar, vocals (2020)
- Seth Lester – guitar (2020)
- Wesley James Mitzelfield – drums (2020)
- John Lee – bass (2020)
- Kenny Lawrence – lead vocals (2021-2022)
- Drew Spencer – guitar (2021-2022)
- Stuart McConnell – guitar (2021-2022)
- Chief Spires – bass (2021-2022)
- Dave Somerville – drums (2021-2022)

== Discography ==
=== Studio albums ===
- No Reservations (1975)
- Flyin' High (1976)
- Strikes (1979) US No. 42 (RIAA: platinum)
- Tomcattin' (1980) US No. 50
- Marauder (1981) US No. 48
- Siogo (1983) US No. 82
- Vertical Smiles (1984) US No. 176
- Rick Medlocke and Blackfoot (1987)
- Medicine Man (1990)
- After the Reign (1994)
- Southern Native (2016)

=== Live albums ===
- Highway Song Live (1982)
- Live on the King Biscuit Flower Hour

( at The Palladium, California, 10th August 1983 ) (1998 / 2003 / 2004)

- Train Train: Southern Rock's Best – Live (2007/2011)

=== Singles ===
- "Railroad Man" (1975)
- "Highway Song" (1979) US No. 26
- "Train, Train" (1979) US No. 38
- "Spendin' Cabbage" (1980)
- "On the Run" (1980)
- "Dry County" (1980)
- "Fly Away" (1981) US No. 42
- "Searchin'" (1981) US No. 108
- "Send Me an Angel" (1983)
- "Teenage Idol" (1983) US No. 103
- "Morning Dew" (1984)
- "Guitar Slingers Song and Dance" (1990)
- "Never Run Out Of Road" (2024)
- " Rise Again" (2024)

=== Compilations ===
- Rattlesnake Rock N' Roll: The Best of Blackfoot (1994)
- Greatest Hits (2002)

=== Radio shows ===
- Blackfoot Interview (1978)
- Blackfoot – Johnny Van Zant (1979 Reading Festival)
- Blackfoot – Stevie Ray Vaughan KBFH (1980)
- Blackfoot – Triumph KBFH (1981 [Best of the Biscuit])
- Blackfoot KBFH (1982)
- Rickey Medlocke Eddie Trunk (2024)

=== Rare items ===
- Wishing Well/Highway Song Japanese (1979)
- Maxi single (1980)
- Blackfoot Picture Disc

=== DVD ===
- Train Train (2007) Atco Records
- Blackfoot: Live in Kentucky (2008)

== Other sources ==
- Rickey Medlocke's Blackfoot announces January 25, 2025 show at Penn's Peak in Jim Thorpe, PA, September 19, 2024 Rickey Medlocke’s Blackfoot w/Peacemaker | Penn's Peak
- Rickey Medlocke's Blackfoot Current Lineup Ashley Talent InternationalAshley Talent International, llc
- Rickey Medlocke's Band releases "Never Run Out of Road" Rickey Medlocke Releases “Never Run Out Of Road” Benefit Single
- Rickey Medlocke's Band releases "Rise Again" RICKEY MEDLOCKE BAND Releases New Country-Infused Rock Anthem 'Rise Again'
