= Axe (band) =

American hard rock band

- Origin: Gainesville, Florida, United States
- Genres: Hard rock
- Years active: 1979–1984, 1989, 1995-2019

Axe (stylized as AXE) was an American hard rock band from Gainesville, Florida, formed in 1979 and disbanded in 2012. The band is best known for their 1982 song "Rock 'N' Roll Party in the Streets", and had other hits such as "Now or Never", "I Think You'll Remember Tonight" and "Heat in the Street".

== Biography ==
Previously known as Babyface with a line-up of vocalist Edgar Riley, guitarist Bobby Barth, bassist Mike Turpin and drummer Bob Miles and managed by J. Brian Gendimenico (1962–2016), the group adopted the new title of Axe in 1979 when the band added second guitarist Michael Osborne. Signing with MCA Records, by manager Lou Manganiello Jr, Axe released their self-titled debut in 1979 and immediately gained attention with a melodic rock sound comprising heavy guitars mixed with keyboards. Band leader Bobby Barth had first picked up a guitar in 1965, encouraged by his father who was already an accomplished player, although Barth's first interest had been in the drums. As a drummer Barth had made his first public appearance in 1963, but would not play in front of an audience in his new vocation until 1967 at a college gig in Colorado. Barth claims to have no recollections of the bands whose singles he played on early in his professional career, although he does recall that his first vinyl appearance was covering a Rolling Stones song, before later forming Babyface.

Following Axe with 1980's Living On The Edge the group switched labels to Atco in 1982 for third album Offering, an album that included the hit anthem "Rock n' Roll Party In The Streets" and a cover of Montrose's "I Got The Fire". The album marked the addition of new bassist Wayne Haner to the ranks and AXE got to tour with Scorpions, Kiss, Judas Priest, Ozzy Osbourne and ZZ Top. The band also played in Britain during 1983 opening for Iron Maiden.

The band was notable for being photographed on the back cover of their second LP all sporting B. C. Rich guitars, one of the first bands to use them exclusively.

Following the arrival of the band's fourth album Nemesis and touring with Mötley Crüe in 1984, AXE suffered a setback when guitarist Michael Osborne was killed in an auto crash in which a badly injured Bobby Barth was lucky enough to escape with his life. The band dissolved following the tragedy.

Barth, once recovered, joined Blackfoot, replacing the seasoned Ken Hensley after the release of the 1984 album Vertical Smiles and for the subsequent touring. The tenure was short lived however and Barth subsequently released a well crafted solo album Two Hearts, One Beat on Atco Records in 1986. An attempt in 1989 at reforming AXE, including UFO drummer Andy Parker, was made but petered out, with Barth going to Australia in order to work with ex-Rose Tattoo frontman Angry Anderson.

Upon his return to America in 1991 the Denver, Colorado-based Caught in the Act came to his attention and, persuaded to take the band under his wing, Barth set to work producing demos. The ensuing debut album, which was eventually released on the Swedish Empire label and featuring covers of two AXE classics, Silent Soldiers and Steal Another Fantasy. Barth has continued to work with the group on a second record, although Caught in the Act has since had to revert to the C.I.T.A. handle due to the existence of a Dutch Boy band with prior claim to the name.

Due to Barth's connections with the Japanese label Zero and German company MTM Music, he felt there was sufficient interest in AXE to make a renewed effort to put the group back together, albeit with a slightly revised line-up, and the release of a brand new album, aptly titled Five.

The reformed 1997 line up was former Frank Zappa vocalist Bob Harris, Barth on guitars, Edgar Riley Jr on keyboards and original drummer Teddy Mueller (born Ted J. Mueller on September 13, 1954) plus bassist Blake Eberhard, vocalist Bob Harris, and keyboardist Rob Lowe. Blake is one of Colorado's premier studio and live bassists. He joined Axe after being hired by Barth for several recording sessions, and added the new dimension of fretless bass and slap-bass style to the Axe sound. In the interim period between the band's split and the reformation, Edgar Riley Jr had worked with Frank Zappa and had also played with several unidentified bands in the Southern states of America and Teddy Mueller had got involved in the publishing industry.

A brand new AXE album, Axe (Twenty Years From Home) was released in September 1997 featuring re-recorded versions of choice tracks from each of the first four AXE albums, plus two from the recently released V record. For their 2001 album The Crown the group inducted new personnel guitarist Danny Masters and drummer Christian Teele. Masters had previously issued solo albums Electric Babylon and Till The Moon Goes Away. AXE would release a limited edition mini album Live In America 1981 to commemorate their European 2001 tour dates. The same year would find Barth gaining production credits with Denver's BLISTER 66.

Barth is also a member of Southern Rockers Red Rock Roosters releasing an album Attitude Is Everything in 1998. During 2003 Bob Harris re-emerged fronting the Edge of Forever project, an eighties Rock styled venture in union with keyboard player Alessandro Del Vecchio, bassist Christian Grillo and the Sleek, Gotthard and U.D.O. credited guitarist Igor Gianola.

In 2004, Barth rejoined Blackfoot.

Ted Mueller died on June 29, 2012, at the age of 57.

== Band members ==
Current

- Bobby Barth – guitar (1979–1984, 1989, 1997–present), lead vocals (1979–1984, 1989, 1997–2006)
- Bob Harris – keyboards, lead vocals (1997–2001, 2006–present)
- Gerald Berger – bass (2006–present)
- David Landes – guitar (2004–present)
- Scott Misner – drums (2007–present)
- Brad Banhagel – guitar, lead vocals (2004–present)
- Paul Byron – keyboards (2010–present)

Former

- Edgar Riley Jr. – keyboards, backing vocals (1979–1984, 1989, 1997–2006)
- Mike Turpin – bass (1979–1984, 1989)
- Teddy Mueller – drums (1979–1984, 1997–2001; died 2012)
- Michael Osborne – guitar (1979–1984; his death)
- Andy Parker – drums (1989)
- Blake Eberhard – bass (1997–2001)
- Rob Lowe – keyboards, backing vocals (1997–1998)
- Danny Masters – guitar (2001)
- Christian Teele – drums (2001)
- Javier Salinas – keyboards (2006–2010)
- Wayne "The Dangler" Haner – bass (1980–1984)

== Discography ==
=== Studio albums ===
Title	Album details	Chart
Title	Album details	US
Axe	Released: 1979; Label: MCA Records	—
Living on the Edge	Released: 1980; Label: MCA Records	—
Offering	Released: 1982; Label: ATCO Records	81
Nemesis	Released: 1983; Label: ATCO Records	156
Five	Released: 1996; Label: MTM Music	—
The Crown	Released: 2000; Label: MTM Music	—
Final Offering	Released: 2019; Label: Escape Music	—
"-" denotes a recording that did not chart or was not released in that territory.

=== Singles ===
Year	Title	Peak
Year	Title	Billboard Hot 100
1982	"Now or Never"	64
1983	"I Think You'll Remember Tonight"	94

=== Live albums ===
- Live in America 1981 (2001)
- Live 2012 (NEH Records) (2012)

=== Compilation albums ===
- 20 Years from Home (1997)
- 20 Years from Home Volume II (1998)
- Axeology (2012)

=== Music videos ===
- Rock 'N' Roll Party In The Streets (1982)
- Heat In The Street (1983)
- I Think You'll Remember Tonight (1983)
