= Rickey Medlocke =

American rock musician (born 1950)

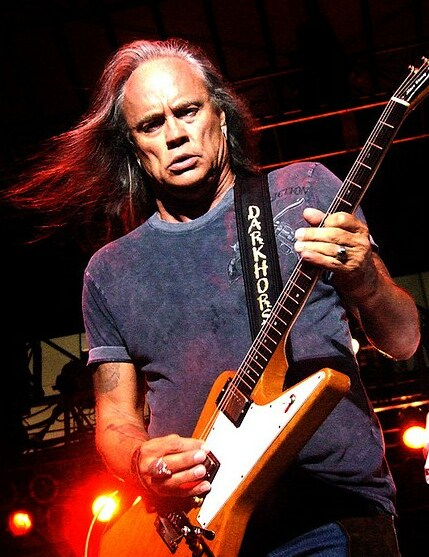
- Medlocke performing live in 2009 (with his customary Gibson Explorer)

Background information
- Born: February 17, 1950 (age 76); Jacksonville, Florida, U.S.
- Genres: Southern rock, hard rock
- Occupation: Musician
- Instruments: Guitar; vocals
- Years active: 1969–present
- Member of: Lynyrd Skynyrd
- Formerly of: Blackfoot

Rickey Medlocke (born February 17, 1950), sometimes credited as Rick, is an American musician, best known as the frontman/guitarist for the Southern rock band Blackfoot and as a member of Lynyrd Skynyrd. During his first stint with Lynyrd Skynyrd from 1971 to 1972, he played drums and sang lead on a few songs that would initially be released on the 1978 album Skynyrd's First and... Last. Medlocke would rejoin Blackfoot in 1972 and later returned to Lynyrd Skynyrd in 1996 as a guitarist. He remains with that band to the present day. Medlocke was inducted into the Native American Music Hall of Fame in 2008.

== Early life ==
Rickey Medlocke was born Rickey Lynn Green on February 17, 1950, in Jacksonville, Florida. He was raised by his maternal grandparents. His grandfather, Paul "Shorty" Medlocke, was a bluegrass musician and taught his grandson to play a miniature banjo. Medlocke started performing onstage at age three, and his musical abilities increased over the years. He began teaching himself to play the guitar by age five and was playing drums in Shorty's band at age eight. Over the next several years Medlocke mastered the banjo, guitar, drums, mandolin, dobro and keyboards. He had a melodic singing voice and had taught himself to sing and play guitar at the same time. After graduating high school, Medlocke formed his first band, Fresh Garbage (inspired by the Spirit song), in which he was lead vocalist and drummer. That band soon changed its name to Hammer, then to Blackfoot.

== Career ==
Medlocke recorded briefly with the 1970s-era Lynyrd Skynyrd band as a session musician, occasionally playing drums or singing lead on a few songs for them in 1971: "One More Time", "Preacher's Daughter", "Lend a Helpin' Hand", "Wino", "White Dove", "Comin' Home", "The Seasons", "Ain't Too Proud to Pray", and "You Run Around". On occasion, Medlocke played alongside the band's original drummer Bob Burns but came to desire the energy of a guitarist at the front of the stage. This resulted in his 1972 decision to reform Blackfoot. The band began touring and producing hit songs that included "Train, Train", which was written by his grandfather, and "Highway Song", lyrics and title were written by Rickey and Blackfoot drummer Jackson Spires. The songs music, backing vocals and solos were arranged by "Blackfoot" and appeared along with songs written by others. He disbanded the group in the early 1990s.

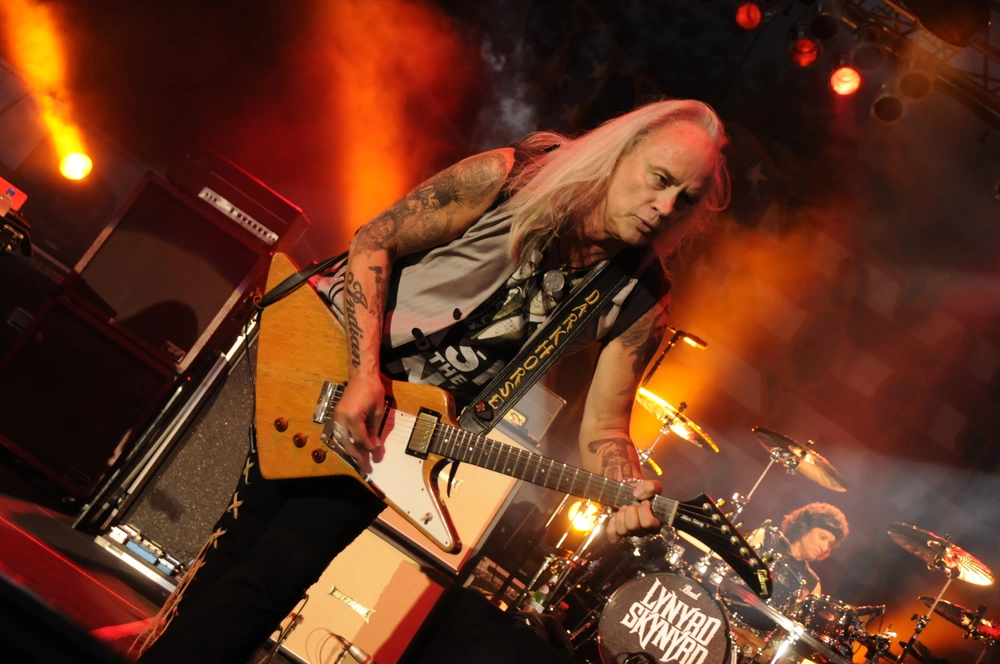
Medlocke with Lynyrd Skynyrd in 2012

For a while in the 1990s, Medlocke thought about pursuing other careers until he received a phone call in 1996 from Gary Rossington inviting him to rejoin Lynyrd Skynyrd as a lead guitarist and primary songwriter. Rossington asked Medlocke if he remembered how to play "Free Bird", "Tuesday's Gone", and "Workin' For MCA", among others.

== Discography ==
=== With Lynyrd Skynyrd ===
- Street Survivors (1977) (drums & chorus on "One More Time", recorded during 1971-1972)
- Skynyrd's First and... Last (1978) (contains early recordings from 1971 and 1972)
- Twenty (1997)
- Lyve from Steel Town (1998)
- Skynyrd's First - The Complete Muscle Shoals Album (1998) (contains early recordings from 1971 and 1972)
- Edge of Forever (1999)
- Christmas Time Again (2000)
- Vicious Cycle (2003)
- Lynyrd Skynyrd Lyve: The Vicious Cycle Tour (2003)
- God & Guns (2010)
- Last of a Dyin' Breed (2012)
