= Iron Maiden Tour =

1980 concert tour by Iron Maiden

- Tour by Iron Maiden
- Poster with the UK tour dates
- Location: Europe
- Associated album: Iron Maiden
- Start date: 1 April 1980
- End date: 21 December 1980
- No. of shows: 103 in total (112 planned)

Iron Maiden concert chronology
- Metal for Muthas Tour (1980); Iron Maiden Tour (1980); Killer World Tour (1981)

The Iron Maiden Tour was a concert tour by the English heavy metal band Iron Maiden in support of their eponymous debut album. The band's first solo headlining tour, it followed the co-headlined Metal for Muthas Tour from earlier in the same year. The tour commenced with a British leg from 1 April to 23 August, although this included one concert in Finland, before the band supported Kiss on their Unmasked Tour from 24 August to 16 October, immediately following which guitarist Dennis Stratton was sacked and replaced with Adrian Smith. After Smith was hired, the band decided to undertake another British tour, taking place from 21 November to 21 December.

The tour would see them perform in mainland Europe for the first time, as well as record their first live video at the Rainbow Theatre, London, on the last night of the tour.

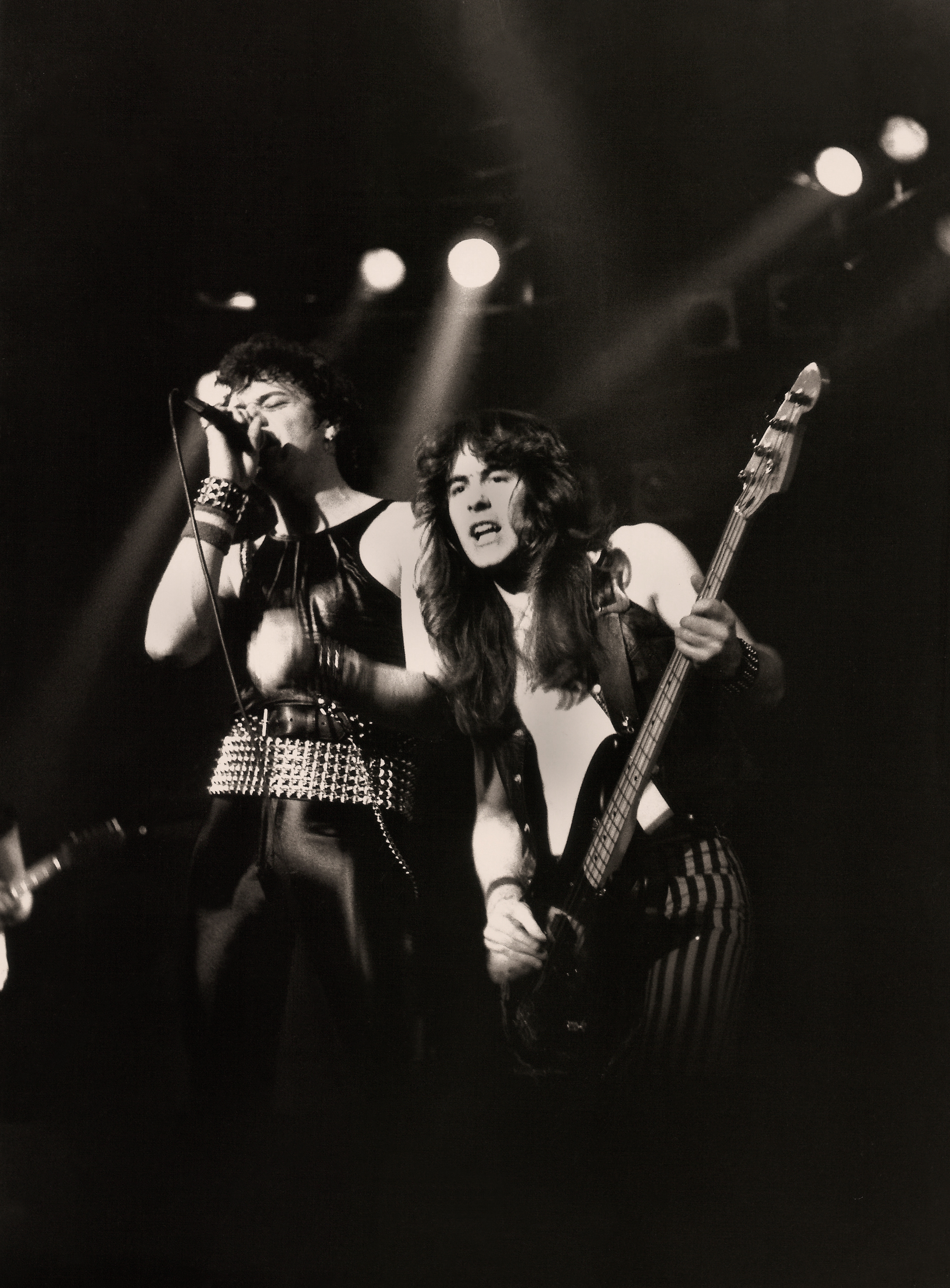
Paul Di'Anno and Steve Harris performing at the Manchester Apollo

== Tour dates ==
List of 1980 concerts
Date	City	Country	Venue
1 April 1980^{[A]}	London	England	Rainbow Theatre
2 April 1980	London	England	Marquee Club
3 April 1980	London	England	Marquee Club
5 April 1980^{[B]}	Kortrijk	Belgium	Festival Grounds
6 April 1980	London	England	The Bandwagon
7 April 1980	Plymouth	England	Fiesta
8 April 1980	London	England	The Ruskin Arms
10 April 1980	Grimsby	England	Central Hall
14 April 1980	London	England	The Ruskin Arms
15 May 1980	Lincoln	England	Lincoln Drill Hall
16 May 1980	Newcastle upon Tyne	England	Mayfair Ballroom
17 May 1980	Dunfermline	Scotland	Kinema Ballroom
18 May 1980	Ayr	Scotland	Ayr Pavilion
19 May 1980	Aberdeen	Scotland	Music Hall
20 May 1980	Carlisle	England	Carlisle Market Hall
21 May 1980	Bradford	England	St George's Hall
22 May 1980	Withernsea	England	Grand Pavilion
23 May 1980	Cambridge	England	Cambridge Corn Exchange
25 May 1980	Dunstable	England	Queensway Hall
27 May 1980	Blackburn	England	King George's Hall
28 May 1980	Wolverhampton	England	Wolverhampton Civic Hall
29 May 1980	Hanley	England	Victoria Hall
30 May 1980	Swindon	England	Brunel Rooms
31 May 1980	St Austell	England	Cornwall Coliseum
1 June 1980	Bristol	England	Locarno
2 June 1980	Malvern	England	Winter Gardens
4 June 1980	Cardiff	Wales	Top Rank Suite
6 June 1980	West Runton	England	West Runton Pavilion
7 June 1980	Birmingham	England	Birmingham Odeon
8 June 1980	Sheffield	England	Top Rank Suite
9 June 1980	Liverpool	England	Royal Court Theatre
11 June 1980	Sunderland	England	Mecca Centre
12 June 1980	Dundee	Scotland	Caird Hall
13 June 1980	Glasgow	Scotland	The Apollo
14 June 1980	Middlesbrough	England	Middlesbrough Town Hall
16 June 1980	Wakefield	England	Unity Hall
17 June 1980	Leicester	England	De Montfort Hall
18 June 1980	Chatham	England	Central Hall
19 June 1980	Guildford	England	Guildford Civic Hall
20 June 1980	London	England	Rainbow Theatre
21 June 1980	Bracknell	England	Bracknell Sports Centre
22 June 1980	Swansea	England	Brangwyn Hall
24 June 1980	Norwich	England	St. Andrew's Hall
25 June 1980	Derby	England	Assembly Rooms
26 June 1980	Manchester	England	Manchester Apollo
27 June 1980	Bath	England	Bath Pavilion
28 June 1980	Oxford	England	The Apollo
29 June 1980	Brighton	England	Top Rank Suite
30 June 1980	Poole	England	Arts Centre
1 July 1980	Portsmouth	England	Locarno
3 July 1980	London	England	Marquee Club
4 July 1980	London	England	Marquee Club
5 July 1980	London	England	Marquee Club
8 July 1980	London	England	Marquee Club
9 July 1980	London	England	Marquee Club
11 July 1980	London	England	Marquee Club
12 July 1980	London	England	Marquee Club
19 July 1980^{[C]}	Oulu	Finland	Kuusisaari
10 August 1980	London	England	Global Village
21 August 1980	West Runton	England	West Runton Pavilion
23 August 1980^{[D]}	Reading	England	Little John's Farm
~~24 August 1980~~^{[E]}	Lisbon	Portugal	Casals Hall
~~25 August 1980~~^{[E]}	Lisbon	Portugal	Casals Hall
29 August 1980^{[E]}	Rome	Italy	Castel Sant'Angelo
~~30 August 1980~~^{[E]}	Perugia	Italy	Stadio Renato Curi
31 August 1980^{[E]}	Genoa	Italy	Palasport di Genova
2 September 1980^{[E]}	Milan	Italy	Velodromo Vigorelli
~~4 September 1980~~	London	England	Marquee Club
~~5 September 1980~~	London	England	Marquee Club
~~6 September 1980~~^{[E]}	Stafford	England	Bingley Hall
~~8 September 1980~~^{[E]}	London	England	Wembley Arena
~~9 September 1980~~^{[E]}	London	England	Wembley Arena
11 September 1980^{[E]}	Neunkirchen am Brand	West Germany	Hemmerleinhalle
12 September 1980^{[E]}	Düsseldorf	West Germany	Philipshalle
13 September 1980^{[E]}^{[F]}	Frankfurt	West Germany	Rebstockgelände
15 September 1980^{[E]}	Dortmund	West Germany	Westfalenhallen
17 September 1980^{[E]}	Sindelfingen	West Germany	Messehalle
18 September 1980^{[E]}	Munich	West Germany	Olympiahalle
20 September 1980^{[E]}	Kassel	West Germany	Eissporthalle
21 September 1980^{[E]}	Forest	Belgium	Forest National
23 September 1980^{[E]}	Avignon	France	Parc des Expositions de Avignon
24 September 1980^{[E]}	Lyon	France	Palais des Sports de Gerland
~~26 September 1980~~^{[E]}	Lille	France	Parc des Expositions de Lille
27 September 1980^{[E]}	Paris	France	Hippodrome de Pantin
28 September 1980^{[E]}	Münchenstein	Switzerland	St. Jakobshalle
30 September 1980^{[E]}	Cologne	West Germany	Sporthalle
1 October 1980^{[E]}	Bremen	West Germany	Stadthalle Bremen
2 October 1980^{[E]}	Hanover	West Germany	Niedersachsenhalle
4 October 1980^{[E]}	Hamburg	West Germany	Ernst-Merck-Halle
5 October 1980^{[E]}	Leiden	Netherlands	Groenoordhallen
6 October 1980^{[E]}	Karlsruhe	West Germany	Schwarzwaldhalle
9 October 1980^{[E]}	Stockholm	Sweden	Eriksdalshallen
10 October 1980^{[E]}	Gothenburg	Sweden	Scandinavium
11 October 1980^{[E]}	Copenhagen	Denmark	Brøndbyhallen
13 October 1980^{[E]}	Drammen	Norway	Drammenshallen
21 November 1980	London	England	Brunel University
22 November 1980	Leeds	England	University of Leeds
23 November 1980	Redcar	England	Coatham Bowl
24 November 1980	Kingston upon Hull	England	Hull City Hall
25 November 1980	Newcastle upon Tyne	England	Newcastle City Hall
26 November 1980	Birmingham	England	Birmingham Odeon
27 November 1980	Derby	England	Assembly Hall
28 November 1980	Hanley	England	Victoria Hall
~~29 November 1980~~	Sheffield	England	University of Sheffield
30 November 1980	Manchester	England	Manchester Apollo
~~1 December 1980~~	Nottingham	England	Rock City
19 December 1980	London	England	Marquee Club
20 December 1980	London	England	Marquee Club
21 December 1980	London	England	Rainbow Theatre

Festivals and other miscellaneous performances
^{A} This concert was in support of Judas Priest
^{B} This concert was a part of Wheel Pop Festival
^{C} This concert was a part of Kuusrock Festival
^{D} This concert was a part of Reading Festival
^{E} This concert was in support of Kiss
^{F} This concert was a part of Open Air Festival

Cancellations

- 24 August 1980: Lisbon, Portugal, Cascais Hall
- 25 August 1980: Lisbon, Portugal, Cascais Hall
- 30 August 1980: Perugia, Italy, Stadio Comunale
- 31 August 1980: Bologna, Italy, Stadio Renato Dall'Ara
- 29 November 1980: Sheffield, England, University of Sheffield; (Paul Di'Anno's throat infection)

== See also ==
- List of Iron Maiden concert tours
