= List of the Smiths' live performances =

The Smiths were an English rock band from 1982 to 1987. This is a chronological list of their known live performances.

== Tour dates ==
Date	Town/City	Country	Venue
4 October 1982	Manchester	United Kingdom	The Ritz (Note: Supporting Blue Rondo à la Turk. Dale Hibbert on bass.)
25 January 1983	Manchester	United Kingdom	Manhattan Sound (Note: First gig with Andy Rourke on bass.)
4 February 1983	Manchester	United Kingdom	The Haçienda (Note: Supporting 52nd Street. "Handsome Devil" from this concert released as the B-side of "Hand in Glove".)
21 February 1983	Manchester	United Kingdom	Rafters (Note: Supporting Richard Hell and the Voidoids.)
23 March 1983	London	United Kingdom	The Rock Garden
6 May 1983	London	United Kingdom	University of London Union (Note: Supporting The Sisters of Mercy.)
21 May 1983	London	United Kingdom	Electric Ballroom, Camden (Note: Supporting The Fall.)
2 June 1983	Cannock Chase	United Kingdom	Miners' Gala
3 June 1983	Birmingham	United Kingdom	Fighting Cocks
4 June 1983	London	United Kingdom	Brixton Ace (Note: Supporting The Decorators.)
29 June 1983	London	United Kingdom	Brixton Ace (Note: "Hand in Glove" from this concert was released as an extra track on the 1992 CD single of "There Is a Light That Never Goes Out".)
30 June 1983	Coventry	United Kingdom	University of Warwick (Note: Sharing the bill with Aztec Camera, The Truth and The Impossible Dreamers.)
1 July 1983	Bournemouth	United Kingdom	Midnight Express Club
6 July 1983	Manchester	United Kingdom	The Haçienda
7 July 1983	London	United Kingdom	The Rock Garden
7 August 1983	London	United Kingdom	Lyceum Ballroom (Note: Supporting Howard Devoto and SPK.)
9 August 1983	London	United Kingdom	Dingwalls, Camden
11 August 1983	Leeds	United Kingdom	Warehouse
19 August 1983	Norwich	United Kingdom	Gala Ballroom
30 August 1983	London	United Kingdom	Dingwalls, Camden (Note: Support act Easterhouse.)
3 September 1983	Colchester	United Kingdom	Woods Leisure Centre
15 September 1983	London	United Kingdom	The Venue (Note: Support acts Felt and The Go-Betweens.)
16 September 1983	Bath	United Kingdom	Moles Club
25 September 1983	London	United Kingdom	Lyceum Ballroom (Note: Supporting Gang of Four.)
29 September 1983	Blackburn	United Kingdom	The Gum Club
30 September 1983	Birmingham	United Kingdom	University of Birmingham
1 October 1983	London	United Kingdom	City of London Polytechnic
5 October 1983	London	United Kingdom	Institute of Contemporary Arts (Note: Part of the ICA's Rock Week. Sharing the bill with Quando Quango and The Impressions.)
14 October 1983	Bangor	United Kingdom	Bangor University
17 October 1983	Sheffield	United Kingdom	University of Sheffield
21 October 1983	London	United Kingdom	North East London Polytechnic
22 October 1983	Liverpool	United Kingdom	Liverpool Polytechnic
27 October 1983	London	United Kingdom	Kingston Polytechnic
28 October 1983	London	United Kingdom	King's College London
10 November 1983	Portsmouth	United Kingdom	Portsmouth Polytechnic
16 November 1983	Leicester	United Kingdom	Leicester Polytechnic
17 November 1983	London	United Kingdom	Westfield College
18 November 1983	Ormskirk	United Kingdom	Edge Hill College
24 November 1983	Manchester	United Kingdom	The Haçienda
6 December 1983	Derby	United Kingdom	Derby Assembly Rooms (Note: Recorded for the BBC series Whistle Test and broadcast on BBC Two on 9 December 1983.)
9 December 1983	Dublin	Ireland	SFX
19 December 1983	London	United Kingdom	Electric Ballroom, Camden (Note: Support act The Red Guitars.)
31 December 1983	New York City	United States	Danceteria
31 January 1984	Sheffield	United Kingdom	University of Sheffield
1 February 1984	Stoke-on-Trent	United Kingdom	North Staffordshire Polytechnic
2 February 1984	Coventry	United Kingdom	University of Warwick
12 February 1984	London	United Kingdom	Lyceum Ballroom (Note: Support acts Billy Bragg and The Redskins.)
14 February 1984	Norwich	United Kingdom	University of East Anglia
15 February 1984	Nottingham	United Kingdom	Rock City
16 February 1984	Leicester	United Kingdom	University of Leicester
18 February 1984	Colchester	United Kingdom	University of Essex
21 February 1984	Bournemouth	United Kingdom	Bournemouth Town Hall
22 February 1984	Reading	United Kingdom	University of Reading
23 February 1984	Swansea	United Kingdom	Swansea University
24 February 1984	Bristol	United Kingdom	University of Bristol
25 February 1984	Brighton	United Kingdom	Brighton Polytechnic
27 February 1984	Canterbury	United Kingdom	University of Kent
28 February 1984	Stoke-on-Trent	United Kingdom	Victoria Hall
29 February 1984	Leeds	United Kingdom	University of Leeds
2 March 1984	Glasgow	United Kingdom	University of Glasgow
3 March 1984	Dundee	United Kingdom	University of Dundee
4 March 1984	Aberdeen	United Kingdom	Fusion Club
5 March 1984	Edinburgh	United Kingdom	Coaster's
7 March 1984	Newcastle upon Tyne	United Kingdom	Mayfair Ballroom
8 March 1984	Middlesbrough	United Kingdom	Middlesbrough Town Hall
9 March 1984	Lancaster	United Kingdom	Lancaster University
10 March 1984	Coventry	United Kingdom	Lanchester Polytechnic
12 March 1984	London	United Kingdom	Hammersmith Palais (Note: Support act The Red Guitars. Guest appearance by Sandie Shaw.)
13 March 1984	Manchester	United Kingdom	Free Trade Hall
14 March 1984	Liverpool	United Kingdom	University of Liverpool
15 March 1984	Kingston upon Hull	United Kingdom	University of Hull
17 March 1984	Loughborough	United Kingdom	Loughborough University
18 March 1984	Leicester	United Kingdom	De Montfort Hall
19 March 1984	Sheffield	United Kingdom	Sheffield City Hall
20 March 1984	Birmingham	United Kingdom	Tower Ballroom (Note: Postponed from 9 February. The original date still appeared on tickets.)
21 April 1984	Amsterdam	Netherlands	Theater de Meervaart
22 April 1984	Bree	Belgium	Breekend Festival
24 April 1984	Zürich	Switzerland	Rote Fabrik
4 May 1984	Hamburg	West Germany	Markthalle Hamburg
9 May 1984	Paris	France	L'Eldorado
17 May 1984	Belfast	United Kingdom	Ulster Hall
18 May 1984	Dublin	Ireland	SFX
19 May 1984	Dublin	Ireland	SFX
20 May 1984	Cork	Ireland	Savoy
3 June 1984	Seinäjoki	Finland	Provinssirock Festival
10 June 1984	London	United Kingdom	Jubilee Gardens – GLC Jobs for a Change Festival
12 June 1984	Carlisle	United Kingdom	Market Hall
13 June 1984	Glasgow	United Kingdom	Barrowland Ballroom
14 June 1984	Edinburgh	United Kingdom	Caley Palais
15 June 1984	Dundee	United Kingdom	Caird Hall
16 June 1984	Aberdeen	United Kingdom	Capitol Theatre
17 June 1984	Inverness	United Kingdom	Eden Court Theatre (Note: Support act Del Amitri.)
20 June 1984	Blackpool	United Kingdom	Opera House Theatre
22 June 1984	St Austell	United Kingdom	Cornwall Coliseum
23 June 1984	Pilton	United Kingdom	Glastonbury Festival
24 September 1984	Gloucester	United Kingdom	Gloucester Leisure Centre (Note: Support act The Woodentops.)
25 September 1984	Cardiff	United Kingdom	Cardiff University
26 September 1984	Swansea	United Kingdom	Mayfair
12 November 1984	Dublin	Ireland	SFX (Note: Support act James.)
13 November 1984	Dublin	Ireland	SFX
14 November 1984 (Note: 11 November according to some sources.)	Waterford	Ireland	Savoy
16 November 1984	Limerick	Ireland	Savoy
17 November 1984	Galway	Ireland	Leisureland
18 November 1984	Cork	Ireland	Savoy
20 November 1984	Letterkenny	Ireland	Leisure Centre
21 November 1984	Coleraine	United Kingdom	University of Ulster
22 November 1984	Belfast	United Kingdom	Ulster Hall
1 December 1984	Paris	France	Paris Expo Porte de Versailles
27 February 1985	Chippenham	United Kingdom	Goldiggers
28 February 1985	Guildford	United Kingdom	Guildford Civic Hall
1 March 1985	London	United Kingdom	Brixton Academy
3 March 1985	Portsmouth	United Kingdom	Portsmouth Guildhall
4 March 1985	Reading	United Kingdom	The Hexagon
6 March 1985	Poole	United Kingdom	Arts Centre
7 March 1985	Brighton	United Kingdom	Brighton Dome
8 March 1985	Margate	United Kingdom	Winter Gardens
11 March 1985	Ipswich	United Kingdom	Gaumont
12 March 1985	Nottingham	United Kingdom	Nottingham Royal Concert Hall
16 March 1985	Stoke-on-Trent	United Kingdom	Victoria Hall
17 March 1985	Birmingham	United Kingdom	Birmingham Hippodrome
18 March 1985	Oxford	United Kingdom	Apollo Theatre (Note: Support act James. "Nowhere Fast", "Shakespeare's Sister", "Stretch Out and Wait" and "Meat Is Murder" from this concert released as the B-sides of "That Joke Isn't Funny Anymore". This concert was broadcast on Janice Long's BBC Radio 1 show on 9 May 1985.)
22 March 1985	Sheffield	United Kingdom	Sheffield City Hall
23 March 1985	Middlesbrough	United Kingdom	Middlesbrough Town Hall
24 March 1985	Newcastle upon Tyne	United Kingdom	Newcastle City Hall
27 March 1985	Liverpool	United Kingdom	Royal Court Theatre
28 March 1985	Bradford	United Kingdom	St George's Hall
29 March 1985	Northampton	United Kingdom	Derngate Theatre
31 March 1985	Manchester	United Kingdom	Palace Theatre
1 April 1985	Leicester	United Kingdom	De Montfort Hall
4 April 1985	Bristol	United Kingdom	Bristol Hippodrome
6 April 1985	London	United Kingdom	Royal Albert Hall (Note: Support act James. Guest appearance by Pete Burns.)
14 May 1985	Rome	Italy	Teatro Tendastrisce
16 May 1985	Barcelona	Spain	Studio 54
18 May 1985	Madrid	Spain	Paseo de Camoens
7 June 1985	Chicago	United States	Aragon Ballroom (Note: Support act Billy Bragg.)
8 June 1985	Royal Oak	United States	Royal Oak Music Theatre
9 June 1985	Vaughan	Canada	Kingswood Music Theatre
11 June 1985	Washington, D.C.	United States	Warner Theatre
12 June 1985	Upper Darby	United States	Tower Theater
14 June 1985	Boston	United States	Opera House
17 June 1985	New York City	United States	Beacon Theatre
18 June 1985	New York City	United States	Beacon Theatre
21 June 1985	Oakland	United States	Kaiser Auditorium
25 June 1985	San Diego	United States	San Diego State University Open Air Theater
27 June 1985	Los Angeles	United States	Hollywood Palladium
28 June 1985	Los Angeles	United States	Hollywood Palladium
29 June 1985	Irvine	United States	Irvine Meadows Amphitheatre
22 September 1985	Irvine	United Kingdom	Magnum Leisure Centre
24 September 1985	Edinburgh	United Kingdom	Edinburgh Playhouse
25 September 1985	Glasgow	United Kingdom	Barrowland Ballroom (Note: "What's the World" from this concert released as a B-side of "I Started Something I Couldn't Finish".)
26 September 1985	Dundee	United Kingdom	Caird Hall
28 September 1985	Lerwick	United Kingdom	Clickimin Centre
30 September 1985	Aberdeen	United Kingdom	Capitol Theatre
1 October 1985	Inverness	United Kingdom	Eden Court Theatre
31 January 1986	Newcastle upon Tyne	United Kingdom	Newcastle City Hall – Red Wedge concert (Note: Also featuring Billy Bragg, Junior Giscombe, The Style Council, The Communards and Prefab Sprout.)
8 February 1986	Liverpool	United Kingdom	Royal Court Theatre (Note: From Manchester With Love benefit gig for Liverpool City Council; sharing the bill with New Order, The Fall and John Cooper Clarke.)
10 February 1986	Dublin	Ireland	National Stadium (Note: Support act The June Brides.)
11 February 1986	Dundalk	Ireland	Fairways Hotel
12 February 1986	Belfast	United Kingdom	Queen's University Belfast
16 July 1986	Glasgow	United Kingdom	Barrowland Ballroom (Note: Including Craig Gannon on guitar.) (Note: Support act Stockholm Monsters.)
17 July 1986	Newcastle upon Tyne	United Kingdom	Mayfair Ballroom
19 July 1986	Manchester	United Kingdom	G-Mex Centre (Note: Part of the Festival of the Tenth Summer.)
20 July 1986	Salford	United Kingdom	University of Salford (Note: Support act Raymonde.)
30 July 1986	London	Canada	Centennial Hall
31 July 1986	Vaughan	Canada	Kingswood Music Theatre
2 August 1986	Ottawa	Canada	Congress Centre
3 August 1986	Montreal	Canada	Université de Montréal
5 August 1986	Mansfield	United States	Great Woods Center
6 August 1986	New York City	United States	Hudson River Park, Pier 84
8 August 1986	Washington, D.C.	United States	Charles E. Smith Center
11 August 1986	Cleveland	United States	Music Hall, Public Auditorium
12 August 1986	Pittsburgh	United States	Fulton Theater
14 August 1986	Detroit	United States	Fox Theatre
15 August 1986	Chicago	United States	Aragon Ballroom
16 August 1986	Milwaukee	United States	Performing Arts Center
22 August 1986	Santa Barbara	United States	Arlington Theater
23 August 1986	Berkeley	United States	Hearst Greek Theatre
25 August 1986	Los Angeles	United States	Universal Amphitheatre
26 August 1986	Los Angeles	United States	Universal Amphitheatre
28 August 1986	Irvine	United States	Irvine Meadows Amphitheatre
29 August 1986	San Diego	United States	San Diego State University Open Air Theater
31 August 1986	Mesa	United States	Mesa Amphitheatre
3 September 1986	Boulder	United States	University of Colorado Boulder Events Center
5 September 1986	Houston	United States	Cullen Performance Hall
6 September 1986	Dallas	United States	Bronco Bowl
8 September 1986	New Orleans	United States	McAlister Auditorium, Tulane University
10 September 1986	St. Petersburg	United States	Bayfront Arena
13 October 1986	Carlisle	United Kingdom	Sands Centre
14 October 1986	Middlesbrough	United Kingdom	Middlesbrough Town Hall
15 October 1986	Wolverhampton	United Kingdom	Wolverhampton Civic Hall
17 October 1986	St Austell	United Kingdom	Cornwall Coliseum
18 October 1986	Gloucester	United Kingdom	Leisure Centre
19 October 1986	Newport	United Kingdom	Newport Centre
21 October 1986	Nottingham	United Kingdom	Nottingham Royal Concert Hall
23 October 1986	London	United Kingdom	Kilburn National Ballroom (Note: Support act Soil. This concert formed the basis of the live album Rank, and also of a BBC Radio 1 In Concert programme first broadcast on 18 April 1987.)
24 October 1986	London	United Kingdom	Brixton Academy (Note: Support act The Railway Children.)
26 October 1986	London	United Kingdom	London Palladium
27 October 1986	Preston	United Kingdom	Preston Guild Hall (Note: This concert was cut short after only one song due to Morrissey being injured by an object thrown onto the stage.)
30 October 1986	Manchester	United Kingdom	Free Trade Hall
12 December 1986	London	United Kingdom	Brixton Academy – Artists Against Apartheid benefit (Note: Support act Pete Shelley. "Some Girls Are Bigger Than Others" from this concert released as a B-side of "I Started Something I Couldn't Finish".)
