= List of Iron Maiden concert tours =

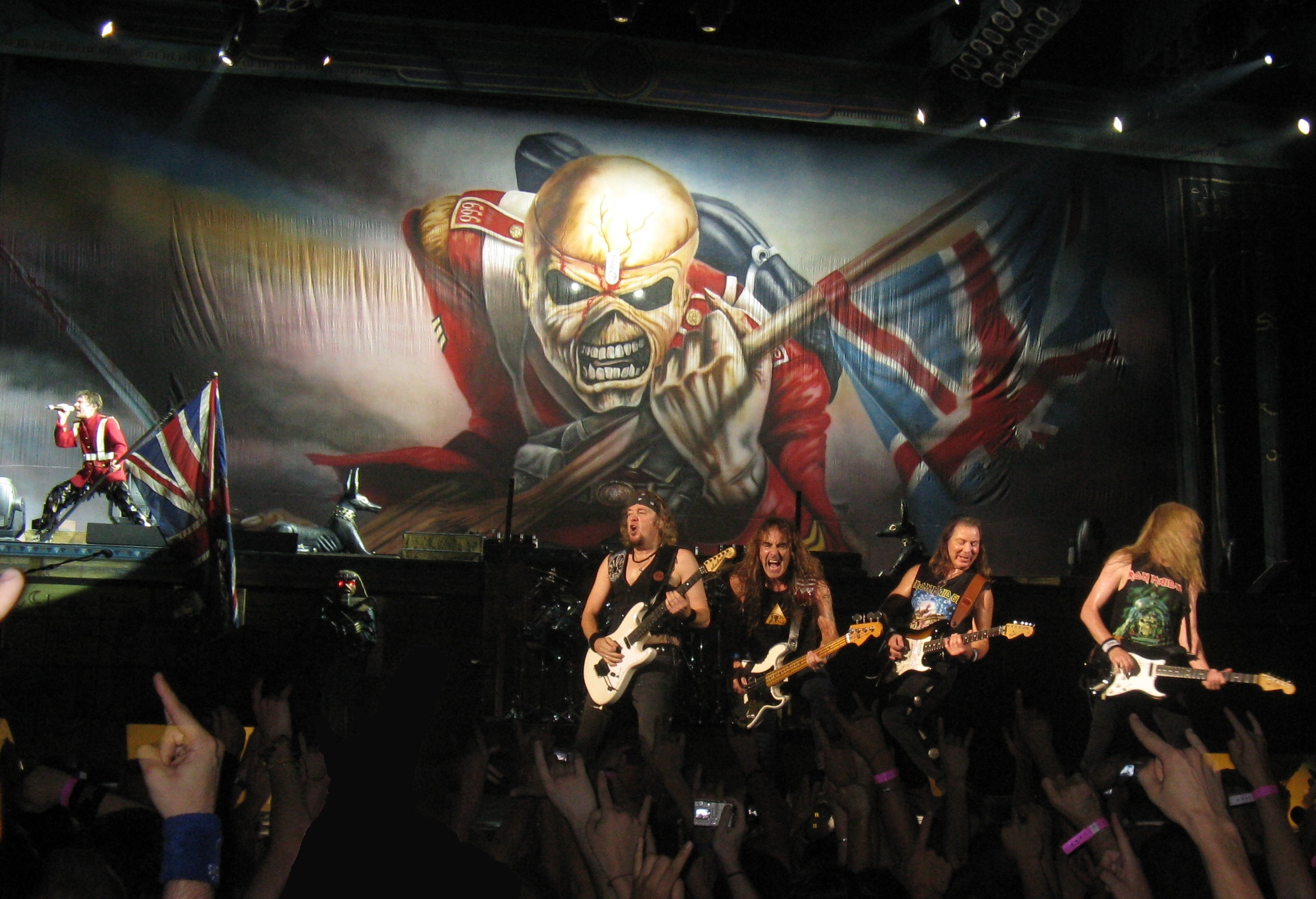
Iron Maiden performing in Paris (Bercy Arena) on 1 July 2008

Iron Maiden are an English heavy metal band, founded in 1975 by bassist Steve Harris in London. After several personnel changes in the 1970s, the band settled on a lineup of Harris, Paul Di'Anno (lead vocals), Dave Murray (lead and rhythm guitars), Dennis Stratton (backing vocals, lead and rhythm guitar) and Clive Burr (drums), before they set out on their first professional tour, the Metal for Muthas Tour which supported the compilation album of the same name. After taking on a supporting slot with Judas Priest on their British Steel Tour and setting out on their own headline tour in support of their debut album, Iron Maiden, the band supported Kiss on the European leg of their Unmasked Tour, following which Stratton was dismissed because of musical differences. Guitarist Adrian Smith was hired, following which Iron Maiden set out on a short series of UK dates before recording their second studio album, Killers.

Following the resulting supporting tour, during which the band played their first shows in North America supporting Judas Priest and UFO, Paul Di'Anno was sacked for his unreliability and was replaced with former Samson vocalist Bruce Dickinson. 1982's The Beast on the Road tour, in support of their UK No. 1 album The Number of the Beast, saw the band return to the US, supporting Scorpions, Rainbow, 38 Special and Judas Priest, following which the band departed ways with drummer Clive Burr, also due to reliability issues. With Burr's replacement, Nicko McBrain, the band set out on their first complete headlining tour, 1983's World Piece Tour, after which the same lineup remained intact for three further successful tours with much larger stage productions; 1984-85's World Slavery Tour, which marked the first time a band had taken a full stage production into the Eastern Bloc, 1986-87's Somewhere on Tour and 1988's Seventh Tour of a Seventh Tour, during which the group headlined before the largest ever crowd at Donington Park.

Unsatisfied with the band's musical direction for 1990's No Prayer for the Dying, guitarist Adrian Smith left the group and was replaced with Janick Gers. For their next two tours, 1990-91's No Prayer on the Road and 1992's Fear of the Dark Tour, Iron Maiden decided to use a less elaborate stage production following their large-scale 1980's tours, after which singer Bruce Dickinson announced he would be leaving the group to focus on his solo career following a farewell tour. In 1995, the band announced Dickinson's replacement, Blaze Bayley, who would remain in Iron Maiden for two stints on the road, The X Factour and Virtual XI World Tour, during which the band played significantly smaller venues before Bayley's departure from the group was prompted by vocal issues on both tours. In 1999, Bruce Dickinson and Adrian Smith returned to Iron Maiden, completing their current six-piece lineup which has set out on nine further tours. Since then, the band's popularity has grown further than their commercial peak in the 1980s, headlining major stadiums worldwide, while the band's 2008-09 Somewhere Back in Time World Tour was described as "groundbreaking" for its introduction of the band's customised Boeing 757, Ed Force One.

Iron Maiden's long touring history has seen them perform across the globe, visiting Europe, North and South America, Oceania, Asia and Africa, from which they have released eleven live albums. The band have headlined several major festivals, such as Rock in Rio, Monsters of Rock, Download Festival, Reading and Leeds Festivals, Wacken Open Air and several editions of Sonisphere Festival. In addition, they have performed in some of the world's largest stadiums, including London's Twickenham Stadium, Gothenburg's Ullevi Stadium, Stockholm's Friends Arena, Mexico City's Foro Sol, San Juan's Estadio Ricardo Saprissa Aymá, Malmö Stadion, Helsinki Olympic Stadium, Lima's Estadio Universidad San Marcos, São Paulo's Estádio do Morumbi, Paris' Parc des Princes, Santiago's Estadio Nacional and Buenos Aires' José Amalfitani Stadium and River Plate Stadium. Overall, the band have visited 59 countries and played over 2000 concerts.

== 1980s tours ==
Year(s)	Title	Legs (locations) and dates	Number of shows (Note: Complete list of shows for Metal for Muthas and British Steel Tour (1980), Iron Maiden Tour (1980), Killer World Tour (1981), The Beast on the Road (1982), World Piece Tour (1983), World Slavery Tour (1984-85), Somewhere on Tour (1986-87) and Seventh Tour of a Seventh Tour (1988) are listed on the IronMaiden.com website. Retrieved 6 June 2012.)	Supported release
1980	Metal for Muthas Tour	1 – 11 February 1980 (Great Britain)	11	Metal for Muthas
The band's first professional concert tour supported the Metal for Muthas compilation album, which included several other artists linked with the new wave of British heavy metal, such as Raven, Tygers of Pan Tang and Praying Mantis. Having only played in small clubs and pubs, this was the first time Iron Maiden would perform in larger venues. Although originally scheduled to play the full 30 dates of the tour, the band dropped out after just 11 performances to record their debut album. According to the band's booking agent, John Jackson, cancelling the dates "actually worked out better for them that way... when Maiden had to leave the tour to finish the album, we decided to make up for it by rescheduling all the dates they had cancelled for the summer. But by then the album had been a big hit and the demand for tickets was suddenly so great that we kept having to add dates on."
1980	British Steel Tour	7 – 27 March 1980 (Great Britain)	19	Iron Maiden
Their first supporting tour with Judas Priest took place between the release of the band's first single, "Running Free", on 8 February and their debut album on 14 April. As these shows would be their first following the Metal for Muthas tour, these dates saw Iron Maiden playing major concert halls for the first time, including the Hammersmith Odeon in London.
1980	Iron Maiden Tour	1 April – 13 October 1980 (Europe); 21 November – 21 December 1980 (England)	101	Iron Maiden
Their first headline tour of the UK began immediately following their shows supporting Judas Priest on the British Steel Tour, during which they took breaks to play festivals in Belgium and Finland in April and July respectively, their first ever performances in mainland Europe. After completing their first UK leg in August, the band returned to the European mainland to support Kiss on their Unmasked Tour, which saw the group's debut performances in major arenas and stadiums. Following these dates, guitarist Dennis Stratton was replaced by Adrian Smith. After deciding that it would be best to play some shows with Smith before recording their next album, 1981's Killers, the band set out on another UK tour, during which their final concert at the Rainbow Theatre in London was filmed for their first ever live video, entitled Live at the Rainbow.
1981	Killer World Tour	17 February – 3 May 1981 (Europe); 21 – 24 May 1981 (Japan); 3 June – 4 August 1981 (North America); 24 August – 23 December 1981 (Europe)	118	Killers
In support of their second studio album, Killers, the band embarked on their first world tour, including their debut shows in Japan, which were released on audio as Maiden Japan, and North America, where they supported Judas Priest (on their World Wide Blitz Tour) and UFO for select dates in the US. Their first ever US performance took place with Judas Priest at The Aladdin Casino, Las Vegas on 3 June. Before this, the band played their first headline shows in mainland Europe and moved into larger venues in the UK, including the Hammersmith Odeon. Iron Maiden's last show with vocalist Paul Di'Anno took place in Copenhagen, after which they undertook a short tour of Italy with his replacement, Bruce Dickinson, before returning to the UK.
1982	The Beast on the Road	25 February – 1 May 1982 (Europe); 11 May – 23 October 1982 (North America); 7 – 21 November 1982 (Australia); 26 November – 10 December 1982 (Japan)	184	The Number of the Beast
Their second world tour would be their last with Clive Burr on drums. The tour debuted in the UK, during which they recorded their show at the Hammersmith Odeon, which was eventually released on audio as Beast over Hammersmith in 2002 while its video footage was included on the 2004 DVD The History of Iron Maiden – Part 1: The Early Days. Following these dates the band returned to North America, where they supported Scorpions on their Blackout Tour (which took them into North American stadiums for the first time), Rainbow on their Straight Between the Eyes US Tour, 38 Special on their Special Forces Tour and Judas Priest on their World Vengeance Tour, in the middle of which they returned to the UK to headline Reading Festival, and afterwards undertook their first tour of Australia.
1983	World Piece Tour	2 May – 12 June 1983 (Europe); 21 June – 25 October 1983 (North America); 7 November – 18 December 1983 (Europe)	139	Piece of Mind
In support of 1983's Piece of Mind, the band undertook their first complete headlining tour (not supporting any other bands), with new drummer Nicko McBrain. While the band were touring in Texas, footage was recorded for a TV documentary, entitled 'Ello Texas, which was later included in the Live After Death 2008 DVD release. The tour concluded with two concerts at Westfalenhallen in Dortmund, where the band headlined a show which included sets from Ozzy Osbourne, Judas Priest, Scorpions, Def Leppard and Quiet Riot. The band's concert was recorded for German TV and the footage was later included in The Early Days DVD.
1984–85	World Slavery Tour	9 August – 14 November 1984 (Europe); 24 November 1984 – 31 March 1985 (North America); 11 January 1985 (Brazil – Rock in Rio); 14 – 25 April 1985 (Japan); 2 – 10 May 1985 (Australia); 23 May – 5 July 1985 (United States)	187	Powerslave
The band's longest and most arduous tour to date, the opening concerts in Poland were reportedly the first time a western artist had taken a full stage production into the Eastern Bloc, and was documented in the Behind the Iron Curtain video. Taking its Egyptian theme from the Powerslave album cover, the stage production was one of the band's most elaborate, which included a large amount of props and other theatrical elements, such as sarcophagi, pyro and a 30-foot mummified Eddie, the band's mascot. In addition to the Eastern Bloc, the band performed their first show in South America, co-headlining the Rock in Rio festival with Queen, with an attendance of 300,000 (thus making it the largest concert the band have ever played). Iron Maiden also undertook their most extensive North American tour ever, including 7 consecutive sell out shows at Radio City Music Hall, although the band were forced to cancel the last two nights as Dickinson was ill, while their four performances from Long Beach, California were released in audio and video formats as Live After Death in 1985. Recordings from the Hammersmith Odeon concerts were also included in the Live After Death audio release.
1986–87	Somewhere on Tour	10 September – 18 December 1986 (Europe); 7 January – 2 May 1987 (North America); 11 – 21 May 1987 (Japan)	151	Somewhere in Time
Following the gruelling World Slavery Tour, the band took more time off before departing on their next successful, although less rigorous, world tour. No footage from the tour was released, except for a small clip used in the 12 Wasted Years documentary as well as bootleg recordings by fans. According to manager Rod Smallwood, he thought it was too soon after 1985's Live After Death to issue another concert video and very little footage was recorded, a decision with which bassist Steve Harris was not pleased.
1988	Seventh Tour of a Seventh Tour	28 – 29 April (West Germany); 8 May – 10 August 1988 (North America); 18 August – 5 October 1988 (Europe); 18 November – 12 December 1988 (United Kingdom)	98	Seventh Son of a Seventh Son
The band set out on another world tour in support of Seventh Son of a Seventh Son, during which they made their debut at Donington Park's Monsters of Rock festival, where they headlined before an audience of 107,000, the largest crowd in the venue's history. The following winter, the band performed in arenas in the UK for the first time, during which the Birmingham NEC shows were recorded and released the following year as Maiden England. As he would leave during No Prayer for the Dying's pre-production stages, this would be the last tour with Adrian Smith on guitar before his return in 1999.

== 1990s tours ==
Year(s)	Title	Legs (locations) and dates	Number of shows (Note: Complete list of shows for No Prayer on the Road (1990-91), Fear of the Dark Tour (1992), Real Live Tour (1993), The X Factour (1995-96), Virtual XI World Tour (1998) and The Ed Hunter Tour (1999) are listed on the IronMaiden.com website. Retrieved 6 June 2012.)	Supported release
1990–91	No Prayer on the Road	19 September – 22 December 1990 (Europe); 13 January – 19 March 1991 (North America); 28 March – 5 April 1991 (Japan); 29 June – 21 September 1991 (Europe)	106	No Prayer for the Dying
For their first concert tour with Janick Gers on guitar, and following the more elaborate production of their 1980s shows, the band decided to return to using a less extensive stage set, featuring fewer props and other effects. Apart from two B-sides on their 1992 single, "From Here to Eternity", no live recordings from this tour were released.
1992	Fear of the Dark Tour	3 – 5 June 1992 (Europe); 8 June – 4 August 1992 (North & South America); 15 August – 19 September 1992 (Europe); 26 September – 10 October 1992 (Central & South America); 20 – 23 October 1992 (Oceania); 26 October – 4 November 1992 (Japan)	65	Fear of the Dark
In support of 1992's Fear of the Dark, the band made a return headline appearance at the Monsters of Rock festival at Donington Park, featuring a guest appearance by Adrian Smith during the encores, which was later released in 1993 in audio and video formats. In addition, A Real Live One and some of A Real Dead One (both released in 1993) were recorded at various venues across Europe. Having last performed there at the Rock in Rio festival in 1984, Iron Maiden returned to South America, although the Chilean show was cancelled following complaints from the Catholic Church, who accused the band of being Satanists.
1993	Real Live Tour	25 March – 28 August 1993 (Europe)	45	A Real Live One
This would be the band's last tour with Bruce Dickinson on vocals before he returned to the band in 1999, with his farewell show, featuring horror magician Simon Drake, taking place at Pinewood Studios and released on video as Raising Hell (1994). Named after the live album, A Real Live One, concerts from this tour comprised most of its follow-up, A Real Dead One.
1995–96	The X Factour	28 September – 12 October 1995 (Africa/Middle East); 14 October 1995 – 2 February 1996 (Europe); 8 February – 5 April 1996 (North America); 11 – 18 April 1996 (Japan); 22 June – 17 August 1996 (Europe); 24 August – 7 September 1996 ([North & South America)	128	The X Factor
For their first shows with Blaze Bayley on vocals, the band decided to start the tour with their first ever performances in Africa and the Middle East. As Iron Maiden's popularity had diminished, they moved into smaller venues in Europe and North America. This was not the case in South America where they headlined the Monsters of Rock festival at Estádio do Pacaembu in São Paulo, Brazil before an audience of approximately 55,000. Due to the tour's heavy schedule, Bayley suffered from vocal issues which meant that several shows in the US had to be cancelled.
1998	Virtual XI World Tour	22 April – 30 May 1998 (Europe); 26 June – 9 August 1998 (North America); 4 September – 26 October 1998 (Europe); 18 – 22 November 1998 (Japan); 2 – 12 December 1998 (South America)	81	Virtual XI
For their world tour in support of 1998's Virtual XI, the band decided to make their first visits to Turkey and Malta, as well as return to a more elaborate production reminiscent of their 1980s stage shows. As with their previous tour, several dates had to be cancelled as Blaze Bayley suffered from vocal issues, which ultimately brought about his departure from the group.
1999	The Ed Hunter Tour	11 July – 8 August 1999 (North America); 9 September – 1 October 1999 (Europe)	28	Ed Hunter
Following the return of Bruce Dickinson and Adrian Smith in January, Iron Maiden decided to undertake a short tour in 1999 with their new six-piece line-up before they recorded their next studio album, 2000's Brave New World. Tying in with the band's new video game and greatest hits collection, Ed Hunter (1999), this was the only time that the band's set-list was compiled from the results of an internet poll. Smith was absent from three concerts to attend his father's funeral, while an injury to Dave Murray's finger in Los Angeles led to the cancellation of the three following shows.

== 2000s tours ==
Year(s)	Title	Legs (locations) and dates	Number of shows (Note: Complete list of shows for Brave New World Tour (2000-02), Give Me Ed... 'Til I'm Dead Tour (2003), Dance of Death World Tour (2003-04), Eddie Rips Up the World Tour (2005), A Matter of Life and Death Tour (2006-07) and Somewhere Back in Time World Tour (2008-09) are listed on the IronMaiden.com website. Retrieved 6 June 2012.)	Supported release
2000–02	Brave New World Tour	2 June – 23 July 2000 (Europe); 1 August – 20 September 2000 (North America); 19 – 29 October 2000 (Japan); 2 November 2000 – 7 January 2001 (United Kingdom); 9 – 19 January 2001 (North & South America); 19 – 21 March 2002 (United Kingdom)	81	Brave New World
As the band did not play in Britain on The Ed Hunter Tour, Iron Maiden's first UK show with their new line-up took place at Earls Court, London and sold out in 3 days. The tour also saw the band return to large venues in the US, such as Madison Square Garden, which sold out in 2 hours. Three European concerts were cancelled after Janick Gers fell off-stage in Mannheim. The tour ended with a performance at the third Rock in Rio, with an estimated attendance of 250,000, which was released on audio and video the following year. Although intending to take time off in 2002, the band held three charity concerts at Brixton Academy, London in March 2002 for former drummer, Clive Burr, shortly after announcing that he had been diagnosed with multiple sclerosis.
2003	Give Me Ed... 'Til I'm Dead Tour	23 May – 12 July 2003 (Europe); 21 July – 30 August 2003 (North America)	55	—
To preview their forthcoming Dance of Death album, the band undertook a summer tour of Europe and North America, during which they headlined the first edition of Download Festival at Donington Park before an audience of 45,000. The stage decoration was based on artwork from the band's past releases, while the Eddie props were based on the 2002 compilation, Edward the Great, and the 2003 music video collection, Visions of the Beast.
2003–04	Dance of Death World Tour	19 October – 21 December 2003 (Europe); 11 – 31 January 2004 (North & South America); 5 – 8 February 2004 (Japan)	52	Dance of Death
Following their summer dates, the band's world tour in support of Dance of Death began that winter, during which their performance at Westfalenhallen in Dortmund was recorded for an audio and video release entitled Death on the Road.
2005	Eddie Rips Up the World Tour	28 May – 9 July 2005 (Europe); 15 July – 20 August 2005 (North America); 26 August – 2 September 2005 (UK/Ireland)	42	—
Following the release of the DVD, The History of Iron Maiden – Part 1: The Early Days, the setlist of Iron Maiden's 2005 summer tour consisted entirely of songs from their first four albums. In Sweden, the band headlined Ullevi Stadium in Gothenburg for the first time, which was broadcast across Scandinavia by SVT. The show's initial 53,500 tickets were sold out in 2 and a half hours. In North America, the group made their first and only appearances at Ozzfest, co-headlining with Black Sabbath, their final performance at which was sabotaged by singer Ozzy Osbourne's family. The tour concluded with another Clive Burr MS Trust Fund charity concert, this time taking place at Hammersmith Apollo, London. Although no live document from the tour was released, Brave Words & Bloody Knuckles reported that a DVD from one of the band's European shows was planned.
2006–07	A Matter of Life and Death Tour	4 – 21 October 2006 (North America); 25 – 31 October 2006 (Japan); 9 November – 23 December 2006 (Europe); 9 – 17 March 2007 (UAE/Europe/India); 2 – 24 June 2007 (Europe)	57	A Matter of Life and Death
Throughout the 2006 tour, the band notably played the A Matter of Life and Death album in its entirety. In 2007, Iron Maiden undertook their first shows in India and United Arab Emirates, after which they played their record breaking fourth headline performance at Donington Park before an audience of 80,000, then the largest crowd in Download Festival's history. The tour ended on 24 June 2007 with another Clive Burr MS Trust Fund charity concert at Brixton Academy, London. Although Bruce Dickinson reported on-stage at Donington that the concert was being filmed for a possible DVD, no footage from the tour has since been released.
2008–09	Somewhere Back in Time World Tour	1 – 16 February 2008 (Asia & Oceania); 19 February – 16 March 2008 (North & South America); 21 May – 21 June 2008 (North America); 27 June – 19 August 2008 (Europe); 10 – 22 February 2009 (Europe, Asia & Oceania); 25 February – 2 April 2009 (North & South America)	90	—
Following the DVD release of Live After Death, the band set out on the Somewhere Back in Time World Tour, during which the setlist consisted primarily of the band's 1980s material, while the stage show was largely a recreation of the World Slavery Tour set, along with elements of the Somewhere on Tour show. The tour was described as "groundbreaking" for its use of Ed Force One, the band's customised Boeing 757, which led to the documentary film Iron Maiden: Flight 666. The band's own charter meant that they were able to visit Ecuador, Peru, Colombia and Costa Rica for the first time. On top of this, Iron Maiden's first ever stadium show in the UK took place at Twickenham Stadium on 5 July 2008, while their largest ever solo show took place in São Paulo on 15 March 2009, with an estimated audience of 63,000.

== 2010s tours ==
Year(s)	Title	Legs (locations) and dates	Number of shows (Note: Complete list of shows for The Final Frontier World Tour (2010-11), the Maiden England North American Tour (2012), the Maiden England World Tour (2013), the Maiden England European Tour (2014), The Book of Souls World Tour (2016) and The Book of Souls World Tour (2017) are listed on the IronMaiden.com website. Retrieved 20 August 2015.)	Supported release
2010-11	The Final Frontier World Tour	9 June – 20 July 2010 (North America); 30 July – 21 August 2010 (Europe); 11 February – 10 March 2011 (Russia, Asia & Oceania); 17 March – 17 April 2011 (North & South America); 28 May – 6 August 2011 (Europe)	98	The Final Frontier
As a preview for The Final Frontier, released that August, Iron Maiden set out on a summer tour of North America and Europe in 2010, during which they played their first concert in Transylvania. The tour recommenced the following year, during which the band used Ed Force One again, leading to their first ever shows in Singapore, Indonesia and South Korea. The planned Japanese shows in Tokyo at Saitama Super Arena were cancelled due to the 2011 Tōhoku earthquake and tsunami. The band's performance at Estadio Nacional in Santiago, Chile, was released in audio and video formats as En Vivo!. Overall, the tour had an estimated attendance of 2 million people.
2012-14	Maiden England World Tour	21 June – 18 August 2012 (North America); 27 May – 31 July 2013 (Europe); 3 September – 2 October 2013 (North & South America); 27 May – 5 July 2014 (Europe)	100	—
Iron Maiden's Maiden England World Tour began with North American shows in June 2012 and continued with worldwide dates in 2013 and additional European concerts in 2014. This included the band's record-breaking fifth headline performance at Donington Park, a return to the Rock in Rio festival in Brazil, and their first appearance in Paraguay. The tour's setlist and stage show was based around the video of the same name, recorded during the Seventh Tour of a Seventh Tour in 1988, which was re-released in 2013 under the title Maiden England '88.
2016-2017	The Book of Souls World Tour	24 February – 16 April 2016 (North & South America); 20 April – 21 May 2016 (Asia, Oceania & Africa); 27 May 2016 – 27 May 2017 (Europe); 3 June 2017 – 22 July 2017 (North America)	117	The Book of Souls
In support of their 2015 album, The Book of Souls, the band visited 35 countries, including their first shows in El Salvador, China and Lithuania. The band again used "Ed Force One" as transport in 2016, although this time they upgraded to a Boeing 747-400 jumbo jet.
2018 – 2022	Legacy of the Beast World Tour	26 May – 11 August 2018 (Europe); 18 July – 15 October 2019 (North & South America); 22 May – 31 July 2022 (Europe); 27 August – 27 October 2022 (North & South America)	140	—

== 2020s tours ==
Year(s)	Title	Legs (locations) and dates	Number of shows	Supported release
2023–2024	The Future Past World Tour	28 May – 5 August 2023 (Europe); 6 October 2023 (North America) 1 - 29 September 2024 (Oceania, Japan); 4 October - 7 December 2024 (North America, South America)	81	Somewhere in Time; Senjutsu
2025–2026	Run for Your Lives World Tour	27 May – 2 August 2025 (Europe)	28	N/A
