= Metal for Muthas Tour =

1980 concert tour

- Tour by various NWOBHM era artists
- Official tour advertisement for the Lyceum, London, 10 February 1980
- Location: United Kingdom
- Start date: 1 February 1980
- End date: 2 March 1980
- No. of shows: 30
Iron Maiden tour chronology
Early Days Shows (1976–79)	Metal for Muthas Tour (1980)	Iron Maiden Tour (1981)

The Metal for Muthas Tour was a 1980 concert tour headlined variously by Motörhead, Samson, and Saxon. Supporting the new wave of British heavy metal compilation album Metal for Muthas, the tour featured a large number of bands identified as the founders of the movement. During the tour, the three headlining bands were supported by twenty-two other bands, including a then-unknown Iron Maiden, who performed on the first 11 dates of the tour.

== Featured acts ==
- Air Angels
- Angel Witch
- Bad Manners
- Blitzfish
- Bombshell
- Desolation Angels
- Diamond Head
- Dogwatch
- Fist
- Iron Maiden
- Magnum
- The Monos
- More
- Motörhead
- Nutz
- Praying Mantis
- Quartz
- Raven
- Samson
- Saxon
- Sledgehammer
- Urchin
- Witchfynde
- Wounded John Scott Cree

== Tour dates ==
Date	City	Country	Venue
1 February 1980	Aberdeen	Scotland	Aberdeen University
2 February 1980	Glasgow	Scotland	Glasgow University
3 February 1980	Saint Andrews	Scotland	St Andrews University
4 February 1980	Edinburgh	Scotland	Tiffany's
5 February 1980	Grimsby	England	Central Hall
6 February 1980	Bristol	England	Romeo & Juliet's
7 February 1980	Wakefield	England	Unity Hall
8 February 1980	Huddersfield	England	Huddersfield Polytechnic
9 February 1980	Manchester	England	UMIST
10 February 1980	London	England	Lyceum Ballroom
11 February 1980	Mansfield	England	Civic Theatre
14 February 1980	Swansea	Wales	Circles
15 February 1980	Hitchin	England	Hitchin College
16 February 1980	West Runton	England	West Runton Pavilion
17 February 1980	Redcar	England	Coatham Bowl
18 February 1980	Birkenhead	England	Hamilton Club
19 February 1980	Oldham	England	Civic Hall
20 February 1980	Blackburn	England	King George's Hall
21 February 1980	Carlisle	England	Market Hall
22 February 1980	Newcastle upon Tyne	England	Mayfair Ballroom
23 February 1980	Leicester	England	Leicester University
24 February 1980	Sheffield	England	Top Rank
25 February 1980	Plymouth	England	Fiesta
26 February 1980	Cardiff	Wales	Top Rank
27 February 1980	Portsmouth	England	Portsmouth Polytechnic
28 February 1980	Wolverhampton	England	Wolverhampton Civic Hall
29 February 1980	Hanley	England	Victoria Hall
1 March 1980	Retford	England	The Porterhouse
2 March 1980	Birmingham	England	Top Rank
