= List of entertainment events held at Veikkaus Arena =

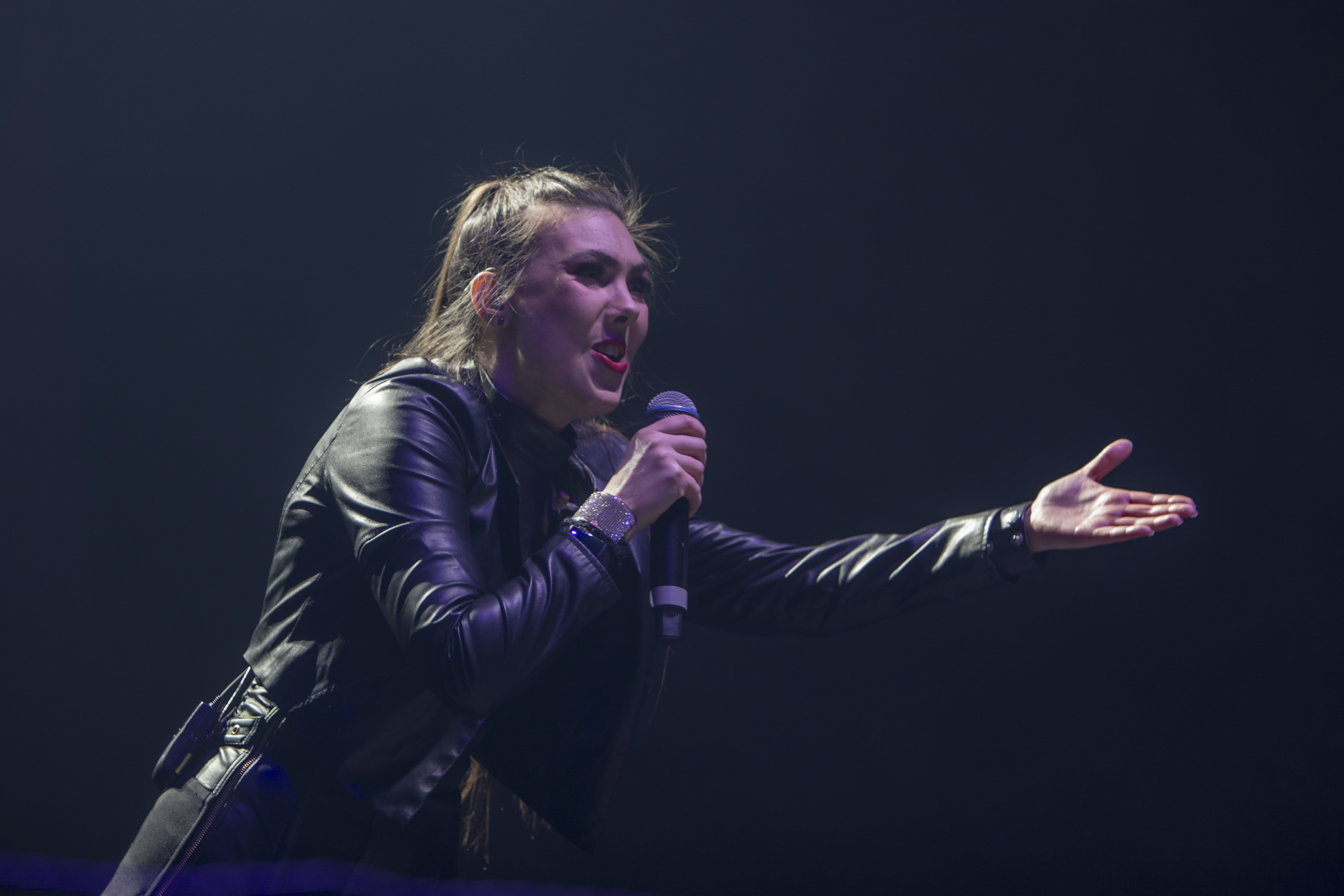
Elize Ryd performing at the Hartwall Arena in 2019

Veikkaus Arena is currently the biggest entertainment venue in Finland, with many artists having performed at the arena, spanning a wide range of music genres. It was known as "Hartwall Areena" in 1997–2014 and as "Hartwall Arena" in 2014–2022. The arena went unused for three years due to sanctions placed on the former Russian owners Roman Rotenberg and Gennady Timchenko following the Russian invasion of Ukraine until it was purchased by real estate company Trevian who reopened the arena in October 2025.

Entertainment events at Helsinki Halli
Date	Artists	Tour	Opening Act
1997
May 15	Aerosmith	Nine Lives Tour	
June 17	Kiss	Alive/Worldwide Tour	The Hellacopters
1998
May 25	Spice Girls	Spiceworld Tour	
May 26	Spice Girls	Spiceworld Tour	
September 9	Depeche Mode	The Singles Tour	
1999
February 26	Kiss	Psycho Circus World Tour	Buckcherry
June 2	Alanis Morissette	Junkie Tour	
August 2	Backstreet Boys	Into the Millennium Tour	
August 3	Backstreet Boys	Into the Millennium Tour	
October 4	Whitney Houston	My Love Is Your Love World Tour	Amanda Marshall
October 5	Whitney Houston	My Love Is Your Love World Tour	Amanda Marshall
November 21	Cher	Believe Tour	Belinda Carlisle
2000
May 16	Bob Dylan	Never Ending Tour 2000	
August 7	Bon Jovi	Crush Tour	
2001
September 19	Depeche Mode	Exciter Tour	
2002
May 31	Roger Waters	In the Flesh Tour	
June 4	Elton John	Songs from the West Coast Tour	
June 5	Elton John	Songs from the West Coast Tour	
October 1	ZZ Top	Euro-Afrique Tour	Gary Moore
2003
June 30	Iron Maiden	Give Me Ed... 'Til I'm Dead Tour	
August 27	Santana	Shaman Tour	
October 9	Bob Dylan	Never Ending Tour 2003	
October 10	David Bowie	A Reality Tour	The Dandy Warhols
November 10	Iron Maiden	Dance of Death World Tour	
November 11	Robbie Williams	2003 Tour	
November 12	Robbie Williams	2003 Tour	
2004
September 21	Sarah Brightman	Harem World Tour	
2005
March 9	Laura Pausini	World Tour '05	
July 5	Black Sabbath	2005 European Tour	
July 6	Iron Maiden	Eddie Rips Up the World Tour	Mastodon
July 7	Iron Maiden	Eddie Rips Up the World Tour	Mastodon
October 2	Backstreet Boys	Never Gone Tour	
October 21	Nightwish	Once Upon a Tour	Sonata Arctica
November 29	Elton John	Peachtree Road Tour	
2006
March 6	Depeche Mode	Touring the Angel	The Bravery
July 5	Guns N' Roses	Chinese Democracy Tour	
July 6	Guns N' Roses	Chinese Democracy Tour	
November 14	Iron Maiden	A Matter of Life and Death Tour	Trivium (band)
November 15	Iron Maiden	A Matter of Life and Death Tour	Trivium (band)
2007
March 14	Shakira	Oral Fixation Tour	
July 7	Aerosmith	World Tour 2007	
October 12	Gwen Stefani	The Sweet Escape Tour	CSS
2008
March 14	Rihanna	Good Girl Gone Bad Tour	Ciara
April 12	Backstreet Boys	Unbreakable Tour	Stanfour
May 27	Kiss	Alive 35 World Tour	Cinder Road
May 28	Kiss	Alive 35 World Tour	Cinder Road
June 1	Bob Dylan	Never Ending Tour	
June 9	Celine Dion	Taking Chances World Tour	Calaisa
June 13	Kylie Minogue	KylieX2008	
2009
April 23	Tina Turner	50th Anniversary Tour	
April 24	Tina Turner	50th Anniversary Tour	
May 20	Laura Pausini	World Tour 2009	
June 4	Eagles	Long Road Out of Eden Tour	
June 14	Metallica	World Magnetic Tour	Lamb of God
June 15	Metallica	World Magnetic Tour	Lamb of God
July 16	Britney Spears	Circus Tour	DJ Havana Brown
September 19	Nightwish	Dark Passion Play World Tour	Apocalyptica
October 22	Muse	The Resistance Tour	
November 11	Marilyn Manson	The High End of Low Tour	
November 12	P!nk	Funhouse Tour	Evermore
November 16	Cliff Richard; The Shadows	The Final Reunion Tour	
December 2	Backstreet Boys	This Is Us Tour	
2010
February 2	Depeche Mode	Tour of the Universe	Nitzer Ebb
June 10	Whitney Houston	Nothing but Love World Tour	Axl Smith
October 13	Lady Gaga	The Monster Ball Tour	
October 14	Lady Gaga	The Monster Ball Tour	
2011
February 22	Kylie Minogue	Aphrodite: Les Folies Tour	
March 20	My Chemical Romance	The World Contamination Tour	
April 7	Enrique Iglesias	Euphoria Tour	Anna Abreu
April 27	Roger Waters	The Wall Live	
April 28	Roger Waters	The Wall Live	
July 21	Prince	Welcome 2	
October 14	Britney Spears	Femme Fatale Tour	Destinee & Paris
December 7	Deep Purple	The Songs That Built Rock Tour	
2012
April 20	Michael Bublé	Crazy Love Tour	Naturally 7
August 27	Lady Gaga	Born This Way Ball	The Darkness; Lady Starlight
August 28	Lady Gaga	Born This Way Ball	The Darkness; Lady Starlight
September 16	Nickelback	Here and Now Tour	
November 5	Michael Jackson: The Immortal World Tour		
November 6	Michael Jackson: The Immortal World Tour		
November 7	Jennifer Lopez	Dance Again World Tour	Stooshe
November 10	Nightwish	Imaginaerum World Tour	
December 10	Muse	The 2nd Law World Tour	Deap Vally
December 20	Swedish House Mafia	One Last Tour	
2013
February 19	Slash	Apocalyptic Love World Tour	
February 24	The Jacksons	Unity Tour	
February 26	The Killers	Battle Born World Tour	Louis XIV
April 26	Justin Bieber	Believe Tour	
May 21	Josh Groban	All That Echoes World Tour	
May 28	P!nk	The Truth About Love Tour	Redrama
June 3	Kiss	Monster World Tour	Reckless Love
June 16	Lana Del Rey	Paradise Tour	Kari Tapiiri
July 28	Rihanna	Diamonds World Tour	GTA
November 13	Scorpions	Rock 'n' Roll Forever Tour	
November 17	Black Sabbath	Reunion Tour	
December 15	Depeche Mode	Delta Machine Tour	
2014
February 21	Michael Bublé	To Be Loved Tour	Naturally 7
February 24	Sarah Brightman	Dreamchaser World Tour	
March 7	Backstreet Boys	In a World Like This Tour	Redrama
March 8	30 Seconds to Mars	Love, Lust, Faith and Dreams Tour	
May 12	Justin Timberlake	The 20/20 Experience World Tour	DJ Freestyle; Steve
May 18	Robbie Williams	Swings Both Ways Live	
May 19	Robbie Williams	Swings Both Ways Live	
May 31	Aerosmith	Global Warming Tour	
June 1	Miley Cyrus	Bangerz Tour	
November 10	Elton John	Follow the Yellow Brick Road Tour	
December 10	Enrique Iglesias	Sex and Love Tour	
2015
March 18	Katy Perry	Prismatic World Tour	Charli XCX
2016
January 18	Slipknot	European Tour 2016	
January 27	Imagine Dragons	Smoke + Mirrors Tour	Sunset Sons
April 4	Mariah Carey	Sweet Sweet Fantasy Tour	
June 3	5 seconds of summer	Sounds Live Feels Live World Tour	Don Broco
June 14	Muse	Drones World Tour	The New Regime
September 2	Nickelback	No Fixed Address Tour	Monster Truck
September 13	Red Hot Chili Peppers	The Getaway World Tour	Battles
September 14	Red Hot Chili Peppers	The Getaway World Tour	Battles
September 26	Justin Bieber	Purpose World Tour	The Knocks
September 27	Justin Bieber	Purpose World Tour	The Knocks
2017
April 15	Saara Aalto	In My Wildest Dreams Concert	
April 28	Andrea Bocelli	Cinema World Tour	
May 4	Kiss	Freedom to Rock Tour	
May 7	Enrique Iglesias	Sex and Love Tour	
May 22	Bruno Mars	24K Magic World Tour	Anderson Paak
November 18	Marcus & Martinus	Hartwall Arena Concert	
November 19	Queen + Adam Lambert	Queen + Adam Lambert Tour 2017–2018	
2018
February 14	Marcus & Martinus	Moments Tour	
February 18	Depeche Mode	Global Spirit Tour	Black Line
May 9	Metallica	WorldWired Tour	Kvelertak
May 11	Metallica	WorldWired Tour	Kvelertak
May 28	Iron Maiden	Legacy of the Beast World Tour	Killswitch Engage
May 29	Iron Maiden	Legacy of the Beast World Tour	Killswitch Engage
2019
June 24	Bob Dylan	Never Ending Tour 2019	
October 5	Ariana Grande	Sweetener World Tour	Ella Mai; Social House
2025
October 16	Bob Dylan	Rough and Rowdy Ways World Wide Tour	
November 9	Roxette	Roxette in Concert	
November 26	Zara Larsson	Midnight Sun Tour	Omar Rudberg
December 12	IBE		
2026
February 6	Disney On Ice		
February 7	Disney On Ice		
February 8	Disney On Ice		
March 20	Anna Abreu	CARNAVAL DE ABREU – 20 years celebration concert	Sara Bee
March 21	Anna Abreu	CARNAVAL DE ABREU – 20 years celebration concert	Sara Bee
March 27	Louis Tomlinson	How Did We Get Here? World Tour	Alex Spencer
March 28	Eino Grön		
April 3	Sini Sabotage		
May 23	Käärijä	EURODISKO	Joker Out / Pure
May 25	Tori Amos	In Times of Dragons	Isaac Levi
May 27	Massive Attack		
June 16	Def Leppard	LIVE 2026	Extreme
June 24	ZZ Top		
July 22	Lenny Kravitz	Live Tour	
July 25	Patti Smith		
July 28	Scorpions		
September 5	Maria Ylipää; JVG; Hector; Anna Puu		
October 18	Placebo		
October 28	Benjamin Ingrosso	What Happens Next?	
October 30	Kaija Koo		
November 28	Kuumaa	Kuumaa 10	
December 5	Hector	Hector,Hector	
December 7	Pitbull		Lil Jon
December 8	Pitbull		Lil Jon
December 18	Raskasta Joulua		
2027
February 22	Five Finger Death Punch		Lamb of God
March 12	Tomas Ledin		
April 10	Rush	Fifty Something	
May 8	Sabaton		
June 5	André Rieu		
June 14	Westlife		

== Other events ==
The venue also hosted the first (and so far the only) Eurovision Song Contest in Finland, after the country's victory in the Eurovision Song Contest in Athens.
