= Killer World Tour =

1981 concert tour by Iron Maiden

- Tour by Iron Maiden
- Location: Europe; Japan; North America
- Associated album: Killers
- Start date: 17 February 1981
- End date: 23 December 1981
- No. of shows: 131 in total (140 scheduled)

Iron Maiden concert chronology
- Iron Maiden Tour (1980); Killer World Tour (1981); The Beast on the Road (1982)

The Killer World Tour was a concert tour by the English heavy metal band Iron Maiden from 17 February 1981 to 15 November 1981. This was the band's first world tour, including their debut shows in North America (where they supported Judas Priest on their World Wide Blitz Tour, and UFO on select dates) and Japan where they recorded the live release, Maiden Japan. On top of this, the band moved into larger venues in the United Kingdom, including the Hammersmith Odeon, in London.

This would be Iron Maiden's last tour with singer Paul Di'Anno, who was dismissed due to his unreliability. He was replaced by Samson vocalist Bruce Dickinson, with whom the band undertook a short series of concerts in Italy and the UK from 26 October to 23 December, before they set about writing and recording their next album, The Number of the Beast.

== Tour dates ==
List of 1981 concerts
Date	City	Country	Venue
17 February 1981	Ipswich	England	Gaumont Theatre
18 February 1981	Norwich	England	University of East Anglia
19 February 1981	Oxford	England	New Theatre Oxford
20 February 1981	Lancaster	England	Lancaster University
21 February 1981	Derby	England	Assembly Rooms
22 February 1981	Manchester	England	Manchester Apollo
23 February 1981	Hanley	England	Victoria Hall
24 February 1981	Dunstable	England	Queensway Hall
26 February 1981	Guildford	England	Guildford Civic Hall
27 February 1981	Bristol	England	Colston Hall
28 February 1981	Taunton	England	Taunton Odeon
1 March 1981	Bournemouth	England	Winter Gardens
2 March 1981	Southampton	England	Gaumont Theatre
4 March 1981	Bradford	England	St George's Hall
5 March 1981	Liverpool	England	Royal Court Theatre
6 March 1981	Middlesbrough	England	Middlesbrough Town Hall
7 March 1981	Newcastle upon Tyne	England	Newcastle City Hall
8 March 1981	Glasgow	Scotland	The Apollo
9 March 1981	Edinburgh	Scotland	Odeon Theatre
10 March 1981	Sheffield	England	Sheffield City Hall
12 March 1981	Birmingham	England	Birmingham Odeon
13 March 1981	Cambridge	England	Corn Exchange
14 March 1981	Bracknell	England	Bracknell Sports Centre
15 March 1981	London	England	Hammersmith Odeon
18 March 1981	Lille	France	Palais St. Sauveur
19 March 1981	Hagondage	France	Salle de Fetes
20 March 1981	Reims	France	Maison des Sports
21 March 1981	Paris	France	Bataclan
22 March 1981	Paris	France	Bataclan
23 March 1981	Lyon	France	Palais d'Hiver
24 March 1981	Miramas	France	Salle des Fêtes
25 March 1981	Toulon	France	Patinoire Vert Côteau
26 March 1981	Nice	France	Théâtre de Verdure de Nice
27 March 1981	Montpellier	France	Palais des Sports de Montpellier
30 March 1981	Milan	Italy	Rolling Stone
31 March 1981	Reggio Emilia	Italy	Palasport di Reggio Emilia
1 April 1981	Brescia	Italy	Palasport di Brescia
2 April 1981	Gorizia	Italy	Palasport di Gorizia
3 April 1981	Turin	Italy	PalaRuffini
5 April 1981	Zürich	Switzerland	Volkshaus
6 April 1981	Erlangen	West Germany	Stadhalle Erlagen
7 April 1981	Düsseldorf	West Germany	Phillipshalle
8 April 1981	Cologne	West Germany	Sporthalle
9 April 1981	Kassel	West Germany	Stadthalle Kassel
~~10 April 1981~~	~~West Berlin~~	West Germany	~~Neue Welt~~
11 April 1981	Bremen	West Germany	Stadthalle Bremen
12 April 1981	Wertheim	West Germany	Main-Tauber-Halle
13 April 1981	Munich	West Germany	Schwabinger Brau
14 April 1981	Karlsruhe	West Germany	Gartenhalle
15 April 1981	Stuttgart	West Germany	Ausstellungshalle
~~16 April 1981~~	~~Mannheim~~	West Germany	~~Rosengarten~~
17 April 1981	Strasbourg	France	Tivoli Hall
18 April 1981	Mulhouse	France	Palais des Fêtes
19 April 1981	Douvaine	France	Salle de la Bulle
21 April 1981	Toulouse	France	Colomiers Hall
22 April 1981	Bordeaux	France	Salle du Grand Parc
23 April 1981	Orléans	France	Rothonde
24 April 1981	Genk	Belgium	Limburghal
25 April 1981	Antwerp	Belgium	Cine Roma
26 April 1981	Leiden	Netherlands	Stadsgehoorzaal
~~27 April 1981~~	~~Winschoten~~	Netherlands	~~De Klinker~~
28 April 1981	Nijmegen	Netherlands	Concertgebouw de Vereeniging
29 April 1981	Offenbach	West Germany	Stadthalle Offenbach
~~30 April 1981~~	~~Hanover~~	West Germany	~~Kurhaus Friednstal~~
~~1 May 1981~~	~~Hamburg~~	West Germany	~~Markthalle~~
~~2 May 1981~~	~~Dortmund~~	West Germany	~~Westfallenhalle~~
~~3 May 1981~~	~~West Berlin~~	West Germany	~~Neue Welt~~
~~5 May 1981~~	~~Oslo~~	~~Norway~~	~~Unknown~~
~~7 May 1981~~	~~Lund~~	~~Sweden~~	~~Olympen~~
~~8 May 1981~~	~~Stockholm~~	~~Sweden~~	~~Göta Lejon~~
~~10 May 1981~~	~~Copenhagen~~	~~Denmark~~	~~Odd Fellow~~
21 May 1981	Tokyo	Japan	Kōsei Nenkin Kaikan
22 May 1981	Osaka	Japan	Festival Hall
23 May 1981^{[A]}	Nagoya	Japan	Aichi Kōsei Nenkin Kaikan
24 May 1981	Tokyo	Japan	Nakano Sun Plaza
3 June 1981^{[B]}	Paradise	United States	Aladdin Theatre for the Performing Arts
4 June 1981^{[B]}	Phoenix	United States	Arizona Veterans Memorial Coliseum
5 June 1981^{[B]}	El Paso	United States	El Paso County Coliseum
6 June 1981^{[B]}	Odessa	United States	Ector County Coliseum
7 June 1981^{[B]}	Lubbock	United States	Lubbock Municipal Coliseum
8 June 1981^{[B]}	McAllen	United States	Villa Real
9 June 1981^{[B]}	Laredo	United States	Laredo Civic Center
10 June 1981^{[B]}	San Antonio	United States	Convention Center Arena
11 June 1981^{[B]}	University Park	United States	Moody Coliseum
13 June 1981^{[B]}	Houston	United States	Sam Houston Coliseum
14 June 1981	Detroit	United States	Harpos Concert Theatre
19 June 1981	Toronto	Canada	The Concert Hall
21 June 1981	Montreal	Canada	Le Club
22 June 1981^{[C]}	Milwaukee	United States	Henry Maier Festival Park
26 June 1981	Lynwood	United States	Point East
27 June 1981^{[B]}	Cleveland	United States	Agora Theater
28 June 1981^{[B]}	Landover	United States	Capital Centre
1 July 1981^{[B]}	Asbury Park	United States	Asbury Park Convention Hall
2 July 1981^{[B]}	Salisbury	United States	Wicomico Youth and Civic Center
3 July 1981^{[B]}	Norfolk	United States	Scope Arena
4 July 1981^{[B]}	Pittsburgh	United States	Stanley Theatre
7 July 1981^{[B]}	Myrtle Beach	United States	Myrtle Beach Convention Center
9 July 1981^{[B]}	Atlanta	United States	Fox Theatre
10 July 1981^{[B]}	Johnson City	United States	Freedom Hall
11 July 1981^{[B]}	Memphis	United States	Mid-South Coliseum
12 July 1981^{[B]}	Trotwood	United States	Hara Arena
15 July 1981^{[B]}	Johnstown	United States	Cambria County War Memorial Arena
16 July 1981^{[B]}	Buffalo	United States	Shea's Buffalo
17 July 1981^{[B]}	Rochester	United States	Auditorium Theatre
18 July 1981^{[B]}	Syracuse	United States	Landmark Theatre
19 July 1981^{[B]}	Albany	United States	Palace Theatre
21 July 1981^{[B]}	New York City	United States	Palladium
22 July 1981^{[B]}	New York City	United States	Palladium
23 July 1981^{[B]}	New York City	United States	Palladium
24 July 1981^{[B]}	New York City	United States	Palladium
25 July 1981^{[B]}	New Haven	United States	New Haven Coliseum
26 July 1981^{[B]}	Allentown	United States	Allentown Fairgrounds
28 July 1981^{[B]}	Boston	United States	Orpheum Theatre
29 July 1981^{[B]}	Baltimore	United States	Baltimore Civic Center
30 July 1981^{[B]}	Upper Darby Township	United States	Tower Theater
1 August 1981^{[D]}	San Bernardino	United States	Swing Auditorium
4 August 1981^{[D]}	Long Beach	United States	Long Beach Arena
15 August 1981^{[E]}	Stuttgart	West Germany	Cannstatter Wasen
16 August 1981^{[E]}	Nuremberg	West Germany	Zeppelinfeld
~~22 August 1981~~	~~Baarlo~~	~~Netherlands~~	~~Sportpark De Berckt~~
23 August 1981^{[E]}	Darmstadt	West Germany	Stadion am Böllenfalltor
26 August 1981	Fréjus	France	Arènes de Fréjus
27 August 1981	Cap d'Agde	France	Cap d'Agde Arena
29 August 1981	Bayonne	France	Arènes de Bayonne
31 August 1981	Annecy	France	Parc des Sports
1 September 1981	Orange	France	Roman Theatre of Orange
6 September 1981	Belgrade	Yugoslavia	Belgrade Hippodrome
8 September 1981	Stockholm	Sweden	Göta Lejon
9 September 1981	Lund	Sweden	Olympen
10 September 1981	Copenhagen	Denmark	Odd Fellows Mansion
26 October 1981	Bologna	Italy	Palazzo dello Sport
27 October 1981	Rome	Italy	Teatro Tendastrisce
28 October 1981	Florence	Italy	Teatro Tenda
29 October 1981	Padua	Italy	Palasport San Lazzaro
30 October 1981	Milan	Italy	PalaLido
15 November 1981	London	England	Rainbow Theatre
23 December 1981^{[F]}	London	England	The Ruskin Arms

Festivals and other miscellaneous performances
^{A} Five songs from this show, namely "Running Free", "Remember Tomorrow", "Killers", "Innocent Exile" and "Wrathchild" were recorded and released in the Maiden Japan EP
^{B} This show was in support of Judas Priest
^{C} This concert was a part of Summerfest
^{D} This show was in support of UFO
^{E} This concert was a part of The 4th Golden Summernight Concert (Sunrise Festival)
^{F} This concert was a secret show under the name "Genghis Khan"

Cancelled and rescheduled dates

The tour was subject to a number of cancellations due to problems with Paul Di'Anno's voice, causing four German dates to be cancelled and several Scandinavian dates to be rescheduled. According to band manager Rod Smallwood, the reason for the vocal issues were brought about by adopting a "rock star" lifestyle, which Di'Anno states was because he "couldn't see [his] way to the end of" the band's heavy schedule and that he believed that this was "what you were supposed to do in a big, successful rock band." On the other hand, Steve Harris, the band's bassist, has since said that he did not "know whether he was seeking attention or what", arguing that having to cancel shows because of personal problems was intolerable and ultimately cemented Di'Anno's dismissal. The full list of cancelled dates are as follows:

- 27 April 1981: Winschoten, Netherlands, De Klinker (Poor ticket sales)
- 30 April 1981: Offenbach am Main, West Germany, Stadthalle Offenbach
- 1 May 1981: Hamburg, West Germany
- 2 May 1981: Dortmund, West Germany
- 3 May 1981: West Berlin, Neue Welt
- 7 May 1981: Lund, Sweden, Olympen (Rescheduled to 9 September)
- 8 May 1981: Stockholm, Sweden, Göta Lejon (Rescheduled to 8 September)
- 9 May 1981: Oslo, Norway
- 10 May 1981: Copenhagen, Denmark, Odd Fellows Mansion (Rescheduled to 10 September)
- 22 August 1981: Baarlo, Netherlands, Sportpark De Berckt
