= Twilight Zone (Iron Maiden song) =

Single by Iron Maiden

from the album Killers
- A-side: "Wrathchild" (double A-side)
- Released: 2 March 1981
- Genre: Heavy metal
- Length: 2:32
- Songwriters: Dave Murray; Steve Harris
- Producer: Iron Maiden

Iron Maiden singles chronology
"Women in Uniform" (1980)	"Twilight Zone" / "Wrathchild" (1981)	"Purgatory" (1981)

"Twilight Zone" is the fourth single by Iron Maiden, released on 2 March 1981. It is the lead single to the 1981 LP Killers. The song did not appear in the original album in February, but was included in the U.S. release in June and the international 1998 remaster. At the time of its release, it was the band's second-most successful single, peaking at No. 31 in the UK Singles Chart. It is the band's first single to feature guitarist Adrian Smith. In the 1990 box set, The First Ten Years, it is on the same CD and 12" vinyl as the previous single, "Women in Uniform".

== History ==
"Twilight Zone" was a non-album single in the UK, but it did appear on the US and Canadian versions of the Killers album and as a bonus track on the Japanese version, although mistakenly entitled "Details of Twilight Zone". This came about because the band also sent a telex explaining the song to their Japanese colleagues, headlined "Details of Twilight Zone", which they mistook to be the name of the song itself. It was released a month after the album, in the middle of the band's UK tour. The song was originally intended to be the B-side of Wrathchild, but the band felt it was so strong that it deserved to be the A-side instead. The single's other song, "Wrathchild", was also given 'A-side' status because, according to Steve Harris, "we had a live version of us doing 'Wrathchild' at the Rainbow, before Christmas, on video that we could use. We couldn't afford to pay for another video for 'Twilight Zone', so we did a double A-side, because we knew we were gonna be off touring a lot and, if by any chance they wanted us on Top of the Pops again, at least we'd got a video for 'Wrathchild' we could give them."

Like their two previous single covers, the artwork for "Twilight Zone" was subject to criticism in the press, where it was interpreted as "gratuitous sexism." The media were offended by what appeared to be the band's mascot, Eddie, spying on a young girl in her bedroom. Garry Bushell points out that the critics were mistaken, as the song lyrics and picture on the girl's dressing table insinuate that Eddie is dead and contacting his lover ("Charlotte") from beyond the grave, thus making it the band's first love song. Derek Riggs painted the cover over the course of a weekend, on a CS-10 drawing board, on which he had difficulty painting; the girl was modeled after a friend of his.

In an interview with eonmusic in 2020, Adrian Smith said that the song had been recorded "very quickly", stating that the tempo made the track "almost on the edge of being unplayable". Although uncredited as a writer, Smith also revealed that he had written the song's distinctive harmony section.

The Red Vinyl. The same recording can be found on clear vinyl, as well as standard black vinyl.

== Track listing ==
7" single

Side one
No.	Title	Writer(s)	Length
1.	"Twilight Zone"	Dave Murray, Steve Harris	2:32

Side two
No.	Title	Writer(s)	Length
2.	"Wrathchild"	Harris	2:52

== Personnel ==
Production credits are adapted from the 7 inch vinyl cover.

=== Iron Maiden ===
- Paul Di'Anno – lead vocals
- Dave Murray – guitar
- Adrian Smith – guitar
- Steve Harris – bass
- Clive Burr – drums

=== Production ===
- Iron Maiden – producer
- Nigel Hewitt – engineer
- Derek Riggs – cover illustration

== Charts ==
=== Twilight Zone / Wrathchild ===
Chart (1981)	Peak position
French Singles(SNEP)	27
UK Singles (Official Charts)	31
US Mainstream Rock (Billboard)	31

=== Women in Uniform / Twilight Zone ===
Chart (1990)	Peak position
UK Albums (Official Charts)	10
