= Victoria Hall =

Victoria Hall can refer to:

== People ==
- Victoria Hall, Murder victim of serial killer Steven Wright

== Canada ==
- Victoria Hall (Cobourg), a town hall in Ontario
- Victoria Hall (Hamilton), a commercial building
- Victoria Hall (Petrolia), a town hall in Ontario
- Victoria Hall (Westmount), Quebec

== United Kingdom ==
- The Hub, Edinburgh, formerly Victoria Hall
- Victoria Hall, Ealing, a grade II* listed public hall in Ealing, West London, England
- Victoria Hall, Saltaire, a grade II* listed building and concert hall in Saltaire, West Yorkshire, England
- Victoria Hall, Settle, a concert hall in Settle, North Yorkshire, England
- Victoria Hall, Sheffield, a Methodist church in England
- Victoria Hall, Stoke-on-Trent, a concert hall in England
- Victoria Hall, Sunderland, site of the Victoria Hall disaster

== Other countries ==
Alphabetised by country

- Victoria Hall (Fremantle), a theatre in Western Australia
- Victoria Public Hall, Chennai, a heritage building in India
- Victoria Hall, a student residence at Queen's University at Kingston, Jamaica
- Victoria Hall (Geneva), Switzerland, a concert hall
- Victoria Hall (Pittsburgh), Pennsylvania, U.S., a landmark
- Victoria Hall (Montevideo), Uruguay, a theatre

== See also ==
- Victoria Theatre and Concert Hall, Singapore
- Victoria Theatre (disambiguation)
