= G Live =

Arts centre in Guildford, Surrey, England

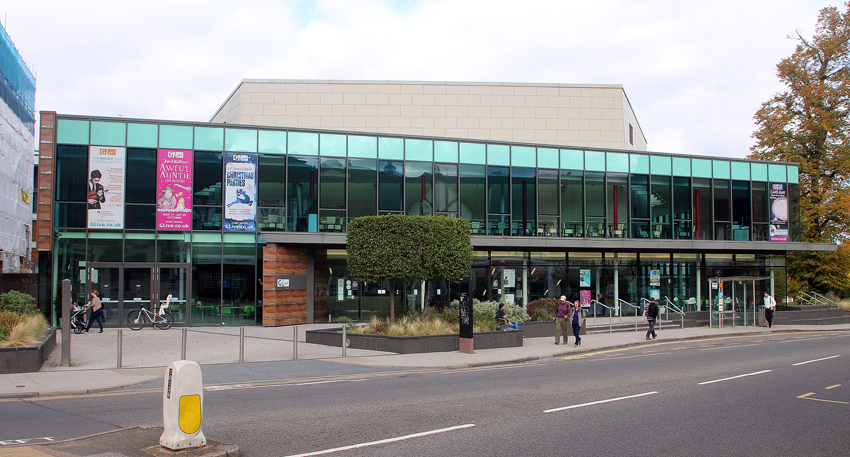

- G Live in Surrey
- Address: London Road
- Location: Guildford
- Coordinates: 51°14′17″N 0°33′59″W
- Owner: Guildford Borough Council
- Operator: Trafalgar Entertainment
- Capacity: Main auditorium: 1000-1700; Bellerby Studio: 100
- Type: Arts and conference venue
- Public transit: 5 minute walk to London Road station. Local buses stop outside.

Construction
- Groundbreaking: August 2009
- Opened: September 2011
- Cost: £26 million
- Architect: Austin-Smith:Lord

Website
- glive.co.uk

G Live is an arts centre in Guildford, Surrey, England. It was officially opened by Prince Edward, Duke of Kent in February 2012.

== Background ==
=== Civic Hall ===
The site was originally home to the Guildford Civic Hall, which was the town's main arts and entertainment venue. It closed in January 2004 for the construction of the new live entertainment and conference venue, G Live, which opened in September 2011. The new building incorporates 80% of the structural material from its predecessor. The venue cost £26m and was officially opened by Prince Edward, Duke of Kent on 8 February 2012.

=== G Live ===
G Live is operated by Trafalgar Entertainment. It had previously been operated by HQ Theatres until March 2021 when Trafalgar acquired HQ's theatre operations. The name was chosen by local members of the public.

G Live hosted 162 shows in its first year of opening. The first show to be held at the venue, which officially opened on September 14 2011, was a performance by the London Symphony Orchestra. Since then, the venue has been open to big names such as Jimmy Carr, Dawn French, Tim Minchin and Diversity and touring productions including The Rocky Horror Show, Lord of the Dance and Strictly Ballroom.

During the COVID-19 pandemic, G Live served as a vaccination centre. The centre was the second borough-owned building to deliver pandemic support alongside Guildford Spectrum.

== Guildford International Concert Series (GICS) ==
G Live has been the home of the Guildford International Concert Series since its establishment in 2011. Every year, the venue hosts a series of concerts of classical orchestral music with groups from across the globe.

Orchestras that have played at the Guildford International Concert Series include the London Symphony Orchestra, Royal Philharmonic Orchestra, Czech National Symphony Orchestra, Swedish Philharmonia and the Bournemouth Symphony Orchestra.

== Creative Learning Programme ==
G Live regularly hosts workshops and events for the local community through its creative learning program, including a "memory cinema" and family fun days, which include "Craft Tables, Face Painting, Drumming, Dance and Reading Corners to spark the imagination along with a Sensory Spectacular area and games" The venue reports an annual engagement of 12,000 people through its Creative Learning department, and adopts an "Arts for All" approach to its activities.

Every year, the venue hosts a "Summer Youth Project" for children from ages 8-17, in the form of a professional, full-scale theatre production. In 2023, the project engaged 71 young persons from the local community for a production of Bugsy Malone.

== Facilities ==
=== Main Auditorium ===
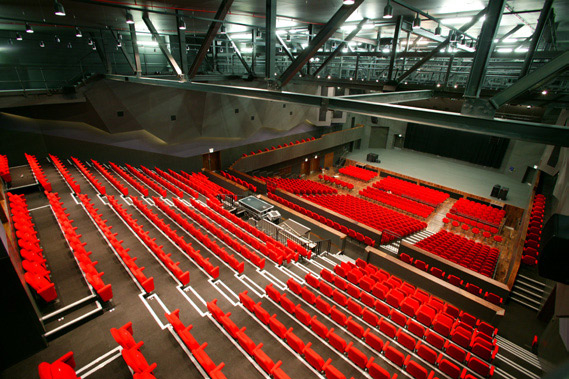
The G Live auditorium from above

The Main Hall features a large extendable stage and seating for up to 1031. With seats removed and converted into a flat floor space, the Main Hall turns into a space suitable for a dinner dance for up to 420 people or a reception for up to 800.

The Main Hall is 418 square metres (19m x 22m) for exhibition and event space. The stage is 231 square metres (22m x 10.5m).

=== Bellerby Studio ===
The Bellerby Studio is a studio theatre that can accommodate up to 120 people standing. It is a multi-functional space with a tall ceiling that can be used for comedy shows, private parties and dining experiences.

=== The Glass Room ===
The glass room is a large conference/entertaining space with fully glazed walls on three sides and a balcony, creating a bright space with a panoramic view. It can be used independently from the rest of the building and is available for private hire.

=== Seminar/Private Dining Rooms ===
G Live has a number of private dining and conference rooms which are equipped with integral AV equipment

== Awards ==
=== 2023 Surrey Rocks Awards ===
On Thursday 25 May, Surrey Rocks Magazine hosted an Awards show at Denbie's Wine Estate in Dorking to celebrate the best of best in Surrey business. The awards were in aid of Prostate Cancer UK and winners were chosen by the Surrey public. G Live won the award for Best Live Music venue over 6 other venues.

=== Royal Institute for Architecture Award ===
On the venue's first birthday, G Live won a regional Downland Award from the Royal Institute of British Architects. Local paper Surrey Live wrote at the time:

G Live’s first birthday this month has been turned into a double celebration, with the announcement that the building’s design has won a regional Downland Award from the Royal Institute of British Architects. Despite its location in London Road, judges described the building as an "anchor" in Guildford’s High Street, suitable for everything from ice shows to banqueting.

=== Experience Guildford Leisure and Lifestyle Award ===
In October 2015, G Live hosted the Experience Guildford Customer Service Awards. After secret shopper reports and thousands of public votes, G Live won the Leisure and Lifestyle award.

== 2013 accident ==
On 9 February 2013, a tour manager from the singing group Fisherman's Friends was killed by a falling metal door at the venue. The group were due to have performed at the venue. One of the singers of the group also suffered critical injuries when the door fell and later also died in hospital. In November 2015 David Naylor, 56, from Bridgnorth, Shropshire, was charged with two counts of manslaughter by gross negligence. In November 2016, Naylor was cleared of manslaughter, and Express Hi-Fold Doors Limited was fined £30,000 for breaches of health and safety laws.
