= Redcar Jazz Club =

Music venue in North Yorkshire, England

Coordinates: 54.6205°N 1.0726°W

Redcar Jazz Club was a music venue located in the seaside town of Redcar, North Yorkshire, England. It was a regular stop for up-and-coming rock musicians during the 1960s and early 1970s. Bands such as Cream, Free, Yes, Curved Air and Pink Floyd all occupied the stage in the ballroom of the Coatham Hotel a Victorian edifice in the grand style. The ballroom, which was the location of the weekly concerts, occupied a later extension to the building on the unfinished east end, the original builder apparently having run out of money in the 1870s. It was owned by Charles Amer, who was the jazz band leader of the Charles Amer Orchestra.

In the early 1970s, bands became too large, both for the small audiences which could fit in the ballroom, and the small stage which had to accommodate ever larger amounts of equipment. The Club folded, and the hotel has been renovated into luxury apartments, under the name Regency Mansions.

In 2007, the home of the Redcar Jazz Club again came to prominence when the Coatham Hotel building was featured in the film Atonement.

== See also ==
- List of jazz clubs
- Coatham Bowl
