= Purgatory (song) =

Single by Iron Maiden

from the album Killers
- B-side: "Genghis Khan"
- Released: 15 June 1981
- Recorded: 1980
- Genre: Heavy metal, speed metal
- Length: 3:22
- Label: EMI
- Songwriter: Steve Harris
- Producer: Martin Birch

Iron Maiden singles chronology
| "Twilight Zone" / "Wrathchild" (1981) | "Purgatory" (1981) | "Run to the Hills" (1982) |

"Purgatory" is Iron Maiden's fifth single, released on 15 June 1981, and would be their last with singer Paul Di'Anno. It served as the second single from Killers. The single was reissued in 1990, on the same CD and 12" vinyl as the EP Maiden Japan, in the First Ten Years box set.

== History ==
According to drummer Nicko McBrain, the track is a remake of one of the band's earlier songs, entitled "Floating", of which "Purgatory" is a faster re-arrangement. It was the group's least successful single as it failed to break into the Top 50 in the UK charts, although the group's manager, Rod Smallwood, states that this was because "it wasn't really a single, it was just lifted off the album which the fans already had."

Most notably, the single's original cover artwork was withdrawn for use on the band's next studio album, The Number of the Beast. Smallwood recalls that, on being presented with the original cover, "we said, 'No, that's much too good,' so we kept it for the album. We had the artwork months before we had the music." This meant that the band's artist, Derek Riggs, had to come up with a replacement, this time illustrating the Devil's face rotting away to reveal the band's mascot, Eddie's, face underneath.

== Track listing ==
7" single

Side one
| No. | Title | Writer(s) | Length |
|---|---|---|---|
| 1. | "Purgatory" | Steve Harris | 3:22 |

Side two
| No. | Title | Writer(s) | Length |
|---|---|---|---|
| 2. | "Genghis Khan" | Harris | 3:10 |

== Personnel ==
Production credits are adapted from the 7 inch vinyl cover.

Iron Maiden

- Paul Di'Anno – vocals
- Dave Murray – guitar
- Adrian Smith – guitar
- Steve Harris – bass guitar
- Clive Burr – drums

Production

- Martin Birch – producer
- Derek Riggs – cover illustration

== Charts ==
=== Purgatory ===
| Chart (1981) | Peak position |
|---|---|
| UK Singles (Official Charts) | 52 |

=== Purgatory / Maiden Japan ===
| Chart (1990) | Peak position |
|---|---|
| UK Singles (Official Charts) | 5 |
