= Neue Welt (Berlin) =

Entertainment venue in Berlin, Germany

Coordinates: 52.486298°N 13.4215°E

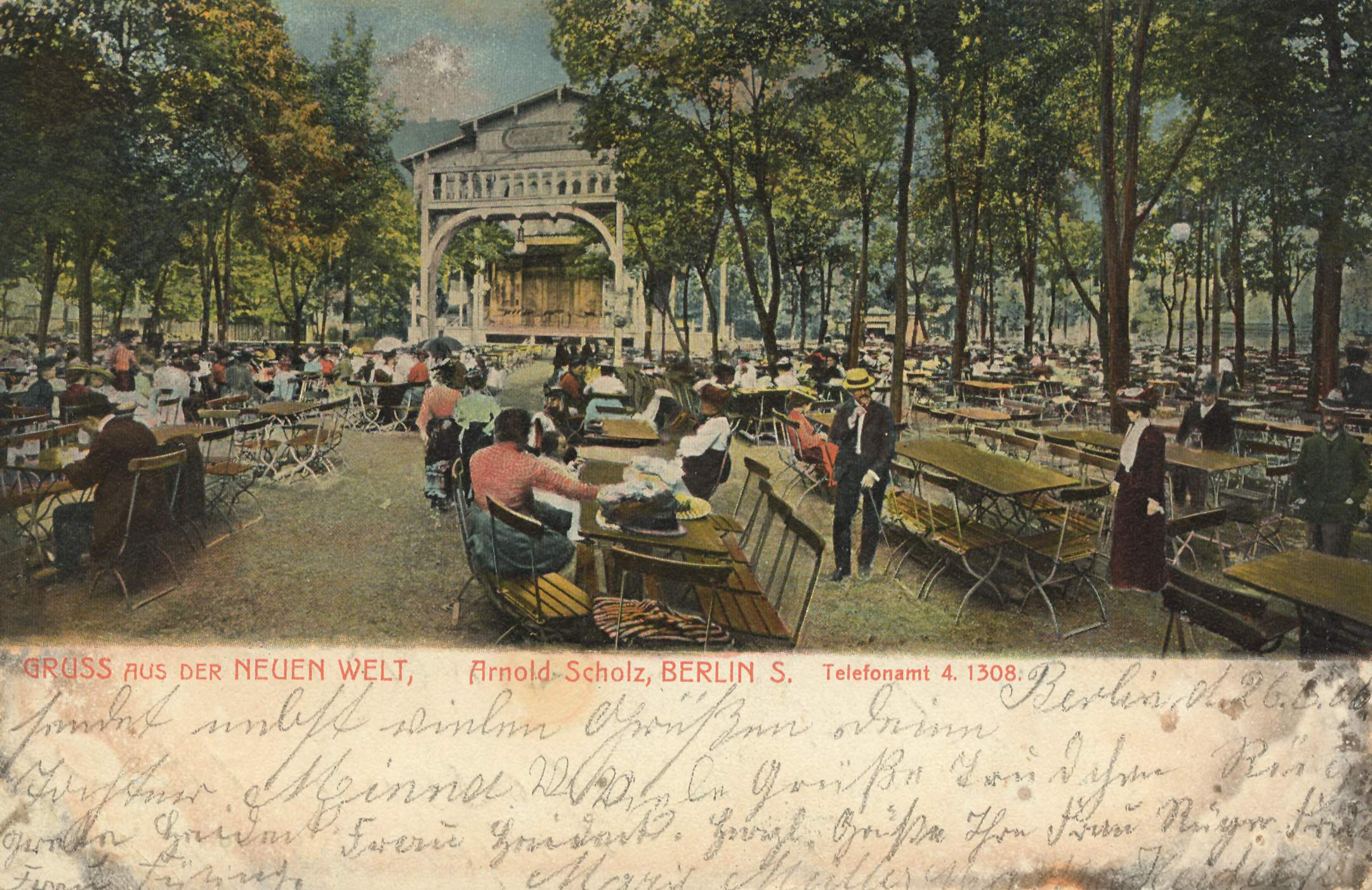
Beer garden at Neue Welt, around 1905

Neue Welt (English: New World) was a concert hall in Berlin, Germany. Neue Welt had two halls. The smaller one held 1,500 people, the larger one up to 3,000. Both were rebuilt around 1950. Adolf Hitler spoke at Neue Welt in 1930 to an audience containing Albert Speer who would later be appointed First Architect. From the 1960s until its closing in 1982, it was a popular venue for pop and rock concerts. Notable performers included Dio, Jimi Hendrix, Ted Nugent, Whitesnake and Bob Seger. Today there is a venue called Huxley's Neue Welt at this location.

After closing in 1982, the location stood empty until 1984. A new concept included a supermarket and a roller skating rink; the building was remodeled accordingly 1984–1985. The Roller Skate Center Neue Welt existed until 1990. The additional name Huxley's may have already been in informal use as early as 1985; however, the official renaming did not take place until February 1992. From that point on, the venue was managed by Thomas Spindler, who had previously organized concerts at the Ecstasy club in Schöneberg. His brother, Peter Spindler, had already founded a corporation named Huxley’s GmbH in 1991 together with two other partners. According to an interview with Thomas Spindler in Tip magazine, the renaming to Huxley's Neue Welt was initiated by Peter and Thomas Spindler and occurred in 1992.
