= Victoria Theatre =

Victoria Theatre may refer to:

== In the United Kingdom ==
- Victoria Theatre, Halifax, located in West Yorkshire, England
- Victoria Theatre, Salford, located in Manchester, England

== In the United States ==
- Victoria Theatre (Dayton, Ohio), located in the United States of America
- Victoria Theatre (Hammerstein's), a demolished theatre located in New York City, United States
- Victoria Theater (Harlem), a demolished theatre in New York City, United States
- Embassy Five Theatre, a demolished theatre known as the Victoria Theatre from 1943 to 1980
- Victoria Theatre, San Francisco, located in the United States
- Victoria Theatre (Shamokin, Pennsylvania), formerly located in the United States
- Victoria Theater (Wheeling, West Virginia), located in the United States

== Elsewhere ==
- Victoria Theatre and Concert Hall, located in Singapore
- Victoria Theatre, Devonport, located in Auckland, New Zealand
- Victoria Theatre (Newcastle), located in New South Wales, Australia
- Coors Event Centre, (formerly the Victoria Theatre), located in Saskatoon, Canada

== Similar names ==
- Victoria Palace Theatre, located in the City of Westminster, England
- Apollo Victoria Theatre, (formerly the New Victoria Theatre, and before that the New Victoria Cinema), also located in the City of Westminster, England
- New Victoria Theatre, located in Woking, England
- Royal Victoria Theatre, Adelaide, South Australia, historical name for Queen's Theatre, Adelaide
- Royal Victoria Theatre, Sydney (1838–1880), in Australia
- New Vic Theatre, a replacement for the Victoria Theatre, in Stoke, Staffordshire, England
- The Old Vic (originally the Royal Coburg Theatre, later known as the Royal Victoria Theatre) located in London, England

== See also ==
- Victoria Hall (disambiguation)
