= IBE =

IBE or Ibe may refer to:

- Chidiebere Ibe, Nigerian medical illustrator and student
- Ibe Wuyts, Belgian singer; see The Voice van Vlaanderen
- Identity-based encryption
- Inference to the Best Explanation
- Intercultural bilingual education
- Internet Booking Engine
- Ion beam etching
- Institute of Biological Engineering
- Institute of Business Ethics
- International Breakdance Event, the "Notorious IBE" festival held annually in the Netherlands
- International Bureau of Education, a UNESCO institute
- Jordon Ibe, English footballer who plays for Derby County as a winger
- Level, an airline with the ICAO code IBE
