= Dance of Death World Tour =

2003–2004 concert tour by Iron Maiden

- Tour by Iron Maiden
- Official tour advertisement for the band's performance in Banská Bystrica, Slovakia, 21 October 2003
- Associated album: Dance of Death
- Start date: 19 October 2003
- End date: 8 February 2004
- No. of shows: 53 (55 Scheduled)

Iron Maiden concert chronology
- Give Me Ed... 'Til I'm Dead Tour (2003); Dance of Death World Tour (2003–2004); Eddie Rips Up the World Tour (2005)

The Dance of Death World Tour was a concert tour by the English heavy metal band Iron Maiden in support of their thirteenth studio album, Dance of Death. The group's eighth live record, Death on the Road, was recorded in Dortmund.

The tour was subject to a short number of cancellations, with the band's shows in Wrocław, Rotterdam and Helsinki being postponed while lead vocalist Bruce Dickinson recovered from flu and laryngitis. On top of this, the group's second show in New York was cut short after one audience member dropped a beer on the soundboard, while the final concert was cancelled due to a scheduling conflict.

== Production ==
Throughout the tour, the stage was decorated to look like a medieval castle, with two towers on either side of the runways, featuring Grim Reaper statues and a castle gate between them for the opening song. The stage floor was decorated to look like a twelve-point star, identical to the one featured in the Dance of Death artwork.

The tour was notable for its extensive use of props and other theatrics. Bruce Dickinson would begin "Dance of Death" from a throne on the left podium, wearing a cape and two Venetian masks, and would later sport a Grim Reaper cloak. Paschendale would begin with battlefield sound effects reminiscent of the First World War, during which the road crew, dressed in military uniform, would place dead bodies and barbed wire around the set, and Bruce Dickinson would recite (pre-recorded) the first two stanzas of "Anthem for Doomed Youth" by Wilfred Owen.

A giant Eddie would appear from the back of the set during "Iron Maiden", wearing a cloak and wielding a scythe. The walk-on Eddie would also appear as the Grim Reaper during "The Number of the Beast."

== Tour dates ==
List of 2003 concerts
Date	City	Country	Venue
19 October 2003	Debrecen	Hungary	Phoenix Hall
21 October 2003	Banská Bystrica	Slovakia	Bystrica Sports Hall
22 October 2003	Prague	Czech Republic	T-Mobile Arena
24 October 2003	Munich	Germany	Olympiahalle
25 October 2003	Stuttgart	Germany	Schleyerhalle
27 October 2003	Assago	Italy	Filaforum
28 October 2003	Florence	Italy	Nelson Mandela Forum
30 October 2003	Zürich	Switzerland	Hallenstadion
~~31 October 2003~~	Thonex	Switzerland	Salles Des Fetes
1 November 2003	Badalona	Spain	Palau Municipal d'Esports de Badalona
2 November 2003	Madrid	Spain	Palacio Vistalegre
4 November 2003	Frankfurt	Germany	Jahrhunderthalle
5 November 2003	Rotterdam	Netherlands	Rotterdam Ahoy (rescheduled)
7 November 2003	Wrocław	Poland	Centennial Hall (rescheduled)
10 November 2003	Helsinki	Finland	Hartwall Arena (rescheduled)
12 November 2003	Copenhagen	Denmark	Valby-Hallen
14 November 2003	Stockholm	Sweden	Globen Arena
15 November 2003	Gothenburg	Sweden	Scandinavium
17 November 2003	Hanover	Germany	Eilenriedehalle
18 November 2003	Berlin	Germany	Treptow Arena
20 November 2003	Leuven	Belgium	Brabenthal
22 November 2003	Paris	France	Palais Omnisports de Paris-Bercy
24 November 2003	Dortmund	Germany	Westfalenhalle
26 November 2003	Hamburg	Germany	Sporthalle
27 November 2003	Leipzig	Germany	Arena
28 November 2003	Wrocław	Poland	Centennial Hall
29 November 2003	Paris	France	Le Zénith (rescheduled)
1 December 2003	Dublin	Ireland	The Point
3 December 2003	Newcastle upon Tyne	England	Telewest Arena
4 December 2003	Nottingham	England	Nottingham Arena
6 December 2003	Sheffield	England	Hallam FM Arena
8 December 2003	Glasgow	Scotland	SECC
9 December 2003	Manchester	England	MEN Arena
12 December 2003	London	England	Earls Court
13 December 2003	Rotterdam	Netherlands	Rotterdam Ahoy
15 December 2003	Cardiff	Wales	Cardiff International Arena
16 December 2003	Birmingham	England	NEC Arena
18 December 2003	Metz	France	Galaxie Amnéville
21 December 2003	Helsinki	Finland	Hartwall Areena

List of 2004 concerts
Date	City	Country	Venue
11 January 2004	Buenos Aires	Argentina	José Amalfitani Stadium
13 January 2004	Santiago	Chile	Pista Atlética
16 January 2004	Rio de Janeiro	Brazil	Claro Hall
17 January 2004	São Paulo	Brazil	Estádio do Pacaembu
20 January 2004	Montreal	Canada	Bell Centre
21 January 2004	Quebec City	Canada	Colisée Pepsi
23 January 2004	New York	United States	Hammerstein Ballroom
24 January 2004	New York	United States	Hammerstein Ballroom
26 January 2004	New York	United States	Hammerstein Ballroom
27 January 2004	New York	United States	Hammerstein Ballroom (cancelled)
30 January 2004	Los Angeles	United States	Universal Amphitheatre
31 January 2004	Los Angeles	United States	Universal Amphitheatre
5 February 2004	Sapporo	Japan	Hokkaido Kosei Nenkin Hall
7 February 2004	Osaka	Japan	Osaka-jō Hall
8 February 2004	Saitama	Japan	Saitama Super Arena
