= Killers (Iron Maiden album) =

Studio album by Iron Maiden
- Released: 16 February 1981
- Recorded: November 1980 – January 1981
- Studio: Battery (London)
- Genre: Heavy metal
- Length: 38:18
- Label: EMI
- Producer: Martin Birch

Iron Maiden chronology
Live!! +one (1980)	Killers (1981)	Maiden Japan (1981)

Singles from Killers
- 1. "Twilight Zone" / "Wrathchild" Released: 2 March 1981; 2. "Purgatory" Released: 15 June 1981

Killers is the second studio album by English heavy metal band Iron Maiden. It was first released on 16 February 1981 in the United Kingdom by EMI Records and on 11 May in the United States by Harvest and Capitol Records. The album was their first with guitarist Adrian Smith, and their last with vocalist Paul Di'Anno, who was fired after problems with his stage performances arose due to his alcohol and cocaine use. Killers was also the first Iron Maiden album recorded with producer Martin Birch, who went on to produce their next eight albums until Fear of the Dark (1992).

== Background ==
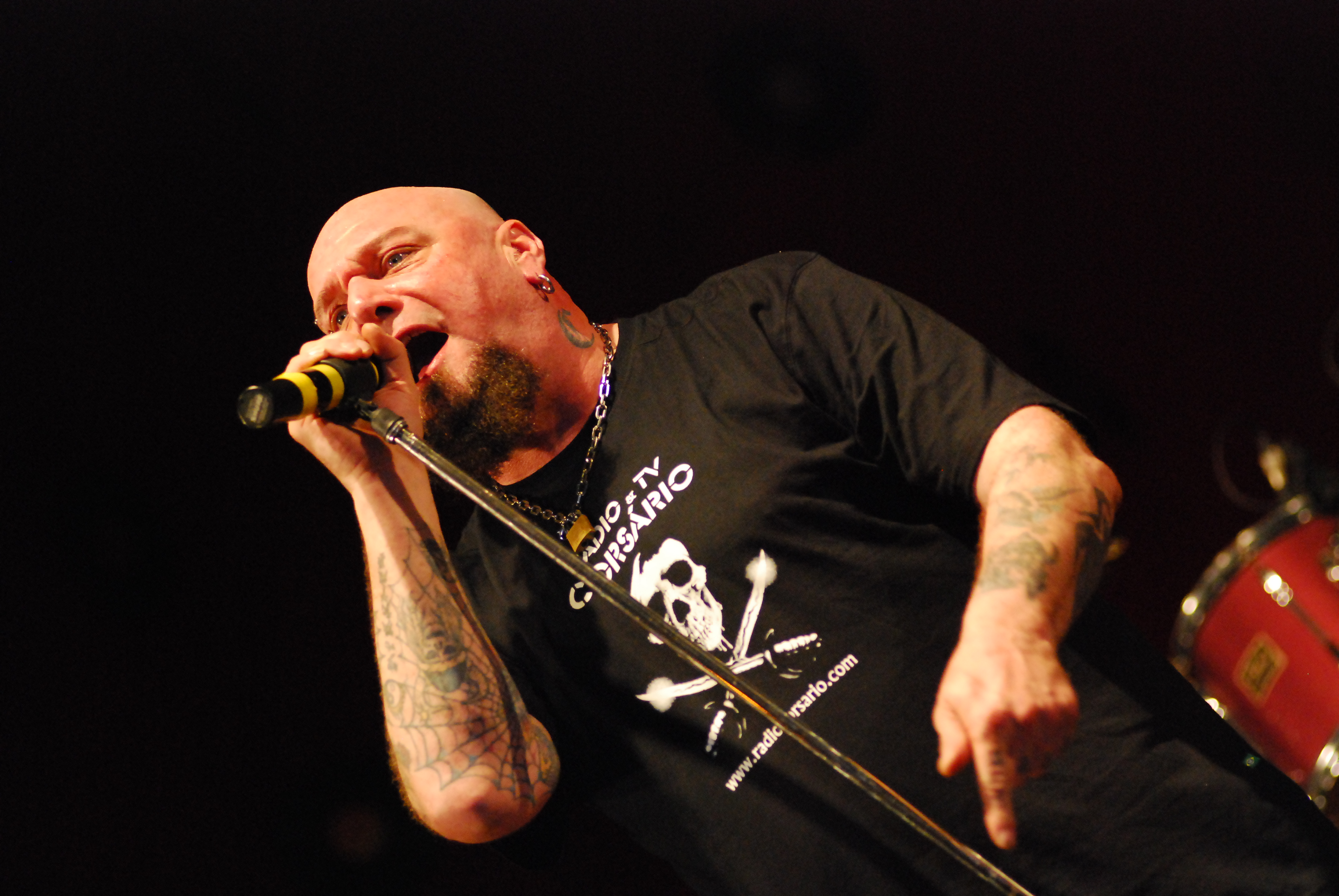
Killers was the second and final Iron Maiden album with vocalist Paul Di'Anno (shown here in 2008)

Killers is the only Iron Maiden album to feature two instrumentals. It was written almost exclusively by Steve Harris; only "Twilight Zone" and the title track are cowritten.

When considering producers for their debut album, Martin Birch had topped the band’s shortlist; however, he was busy working on Heaven And Hell with Black Sabbath. Birch later recalled that when Iron Maiden contacted him regarding Killers, they told him: “We didn’t think we were worthy of you. Because of what you’ve done [in the past] and your reputation, we didn’t think you would take us on.” Birch replied: "That was your first mistake, because I was very disappointed that you didn’t ask me."

Except for "Murders in the Rue Morgue" (based on the story of the same name by Edgar Allan Poe) and "Prodigal Son", the songs were written in the years prior to the recording of their debut album. Five of the album's songs featured in the band's live setlists in 1977, when Dennis Wilcock fronted Iron Maiden. "Wrathchild" and "Strange World" appear to be written as far back as 1976 and original singer Paul Mario Day later claimed he had co-written "Strange World". No songs were recorded professionally until the Killers sessions, with the exception of "Wrathchild" (a version recorded in 1979 was featured on the Metal for Muthas compilation). Both "Innocent Exile" and "Wrathchild," are among the first songs Steve Harris had ever written, all the back in 1973.

Steve Harris later noted in the official Iron Maiden book, Run To The Hills: "Production-wise, Killers was like chalk and cheese compared to the first album." Harris also acknowledged the lack of brand new material on the record; however, he claimed it was nonsensical to deny such good songs a proper release: "The first album was like a ‘best-of’ from our live set, songs which went back years. [For Killers], we still had a lot of really good, strong songs, like 'Wrathchild', and we didn’t want to lose them."

"The Ides of March" is nearly identical to "Thunderburst", by fellow British NWOBHM band Samson, who featured a pre-Maiden Bruce Dickinson on vocals; however, "The Ides of March" was written during the brief time in 1977 in which future Samson drummer Thunderstick was a member of Iron Maiden. While Harris took sole credit for "The Ides of March", "Thunderburst" is credited to Harris and all four members of Samson's Head On line-up, Bruce Bruce, aka Bruce Dickinson, Chris Aylmer, Paul Samson, and Thunderstick, aka Barry Purkis.

The album cover, featuring Eddie holding a bloody axe while his victim grabs his shirt, has in the background the street artist Derek Riggs lived in at the time, Etchingham Court in North Finchley.

Killers spent eight weeks on the UK chart. The North American edition, which came out a few months later, was initially released on Harvest Records/Capitol Records and subsequently on Sanctuary Records/Columbia Records. The song "Twilight Zone" was added to the album. In Australia, the Skyhooks cover "Women in Uniform" was added instead as a bonus track.

The Killer World Tour featured the band's first US shows, beginning at The Aladdin, Las Vegas, in support of Judas Priest. Subsequently, "Wrathchild" is the only regularly played track from the album, appearing in almost all their tours.

== Critical reception ==
Professional ratings
Review scores
Source	Rating
AllMusic	4/5 stars
Collector's Guide to Heavy Metal	9/10
Pitchfork	7.3/10
Sputnikmusic	4/5 stars
The Daily Vault	A−
Ultimate Guitar	9.7/10
Metal.de	10/10
Metal Hammer	3.5/5 stars

Upon release the album was met with mixed reception Robbi Miller from British music weekly Sounds gave Killers a one-star rating, stating "it’s more of a failure than a triumph." However Steve Harris later noted that Miller had dated, and been dumped by, Paul Di’Anno not long before, although he added that early review copies were sent out with an inferior mix.

However as years have passed the album has retrospectively been viewed as a classic album with Metal Hammer stating "Today, Killers occupies a unique place in the Maiden canon. The textbook ‘difficult second album’, it’s beloved by connoisseurs but not widely revered like the albums either side of it. Yet if it could ever be termed a disappointment, it’s only in comparison to what came after it. For Iron Maiden themselves, it represents the most dramatic transition of their illustrious career, and a key stepping stone to what came next."

Steve Huey of AllMusic gave the album 4/5 starts writing "the teaming of new guitarist Adrian Smith with Dave Murray forms the most formidable twin-guitar attack in heavy metal, outside of Glenn Tipton and K.K. Downing. Plus, bassist Steve Harris' busy, driving lines are now consistently audible in the mix. The resulting instrumental fireworks are what truly make the album tick." A reviewer from Ultimate Guitar gave the album a 9.7/10, claiming: "I feel that this is one of Maiden's best albums. Not their #1 best, but easily, let's see, yeah, #3. Right behind Piece of Mind and Seventh Son of a Seventh Son. In my eyes, it shows a stunning jump from the debut, and was really the first album in which the band established a signature sound."

In 2018, Metal Hammer included the album on its list of the 20 Best Albums of 1981. In 2025, Consequence ranked it at number 64 on their list of the 75 Best Metal Albums of All Time.

== Track listing ==
All tracks are written by Steve Harris, except where noted.

Side one
No.	Title	Length
1.	"The Ides of March" (instrumental)	1:48
2.	"Wrathchild"	2:54
3.	"Murders in the Rue Morgue"	4:14
4.	"Another Life"	3:22
5.	"Genghis Khan" (instrumental)	3:02
6.	"Innocent Exile"	3:50

Side two
No.	Title	Writer(s)	Length
7.	"Killers"	Paul Di'Anno; Harris	4:58
8.	"Prodigal Son"		6:05
9.	"Purgatory"		3:18
10.	"Drifter"		4:47
Total length:			38:18

Side two – North American edition
No.	Title	Writer(s)	Length
7.	"Killers"	Di'Anno; Harris	4:58
8.	"Twilight Zone"	Dave Murray; Harris	2:33
9.	"Prodigal Son"		6:05
10.	"Purgatory"		3:18
11.	"Drifter"		4:47
Total length:			40:51

Side two – Australian edition
No.	Title	Writer(s)	Length
7.	"Killers"	Di'Anno; Harris	4:58
8.	"Women in Uniform" (Skyhooks cover)	Greg Macainsh	3:07
9.	"Prodigal Son"		6:05
10.	"Purgatory"		3:18
11.	"Drifter"		4:47
Total length:			41:25

1995 UK reissue bonus disc
No.	Title	Writer(s)	Length
1.	"Twilight Zone"	Murray; Harris	2:33
2.	"Women in Uniform" (Skyhooks cover)	Macainsh	3:07
3.	"Invasion"		2:38
4.	"Phantom of the Opera" (live)		6:55
Total length:			15:13

1995 US reissue bonus disc
No.	Title	Writer(s)	Length
1.	"Women in Uniform" (Skyhooks cover)	Macainsh	3:07
2.	"Invasion"		2:38
3.	"Phantom of the Opera" (live)		6:55
4.	"Running Free" (live; from Maiden Japan)	Harris; Di'Anno	3:07
5.	"Remember Tomorrow" (live; from Maiden Japan)	Harris; Di'Anno	5:44
6.	"Wrathchild" (live; from Maiden Japan)		2:52
7.	"Killers" (live; from Maiden Japan)	Harris; Di'Anno	4:50
8.	"Innocent Exile" (live; from Maiden Japan)		3:46
Total length:			32:59

1998 remastered edition
No.	Title	Writer(s)	Length
1.	"The Ides of March" (instrumental)		1:46
2.	"Wrathchild"		2:55
3.	"Murders in the Rue Morgue"		4:19
4.	"Another Life"		3:23
5.	"Genghis Khan" (instrumental)		3:09
6.	"Innocent Exile"		3:54
7.	"Killers"	Harris; Di'Anno	5:01
8.	"Prodigal Son"		6:12
9.	"Purgatory"		3:20
10.	"Twilight Zone"	Murray; Harris	2:33
11.	"Drifter"		4:49
Total length:			41:21

== Covers ==
The song "Wrathchild" was covered by Gallows on the 2008 tribute CD Maiden Heaven: A Tribute to Iron Maiden, released by Kerrang! magazine.

== Personnel ==
Production and performance credits are adapted from the album liner notes.

=== Iron Maiden ===
- Paul Di'Anno – vocals
- Dave Murray – guitars
- Adrian Smith – guitars
- Steve Harris – bass guitar
- Clive Burr – drums

=== Additional personnel ===
- Martin "Headmaster" Birch – producer, engineer
- Nigel Hewitt – second engineer
- Derek Riggs – cover illustration
- Dave Lights – cover concept
- Robert Ellis – photography
- Rod Smallwood – photography (1998 edition)
- Dennis Stratton – guitar on "Women in Uniform", "Invasion", and "Phantom of the Opera" (1995 edition)
- Tony Platt – producer of "Women in Uniform" (1995 edition)
- Simon Heyworth – remastering (1998 edition)
- Ross Halfin – photography (1998 edition)
- P.G. Brunelli – photography (1998 edition)
- Simon Fowler – photography (1998 edition)
- Denis O'Regan – photography (1998 edition)
- George Chin – photography (1998 edition)

== Charts ==
=== Weekly charts ===
Chart (1981)	Peak position
Australian Albums (Kent Music Report)	20
Austrian Albums (Ö3 Austria)	20
French Albums (SNEP)	1
Finnish Albums (The Official Finnish Charts)	18
German Albums (Offizielle Top 100)	10
Japanese Albums (Oricon)	28
New Zealand Albums (RMNZ)	41
Norwegian Albums (VG-lista)	19
Swedish Albums (Sverigetopplistan)	11
UK Albums (Official Charts)	12
US Billboard 200	78

Chart (2006)	Peak position
Italian Albums (FIMI)	79

Chart (2010)	Peak position
Greek Albums (IFPI)	64

Chart (2018)	Peak position
UK Rock & Metal Albums (Official Charts)	10

Chart (2020–2021)	Peak position
Hungarian Albums (MAHASZ)	22
Portuguese Albums (AFP)	40

Chart (2026)	Peak position
Greek Albums (IFPI)	85

==== Year-end charts ====
Chart (1981)	Position
German Albums (Offizielle Top 100)	26

== Certifications ==
Region	Certification	Certified units/sales
Canada (Music Canada)	Platinum	100,000^{^}
France (SNEP)	3× Gold	300,000^{*}
Germany (BVMI)	Gold	250,000^{^}
Japan (RIAJ)	Gold	100,000
Sweden (GLF)	Gold	50,000^{^}
United Kingdom (BPI)	Gold	100,000^{^}
United States (RIAA)	Gold	500,000^{^}
^{*} Sales figures based on certification alone.^{^} Shipments figures based on certification alone.
