= Eddie Rips Up the World Tour =

2005 concert tour by Iron Maiden

- Tour by Iron Maiden
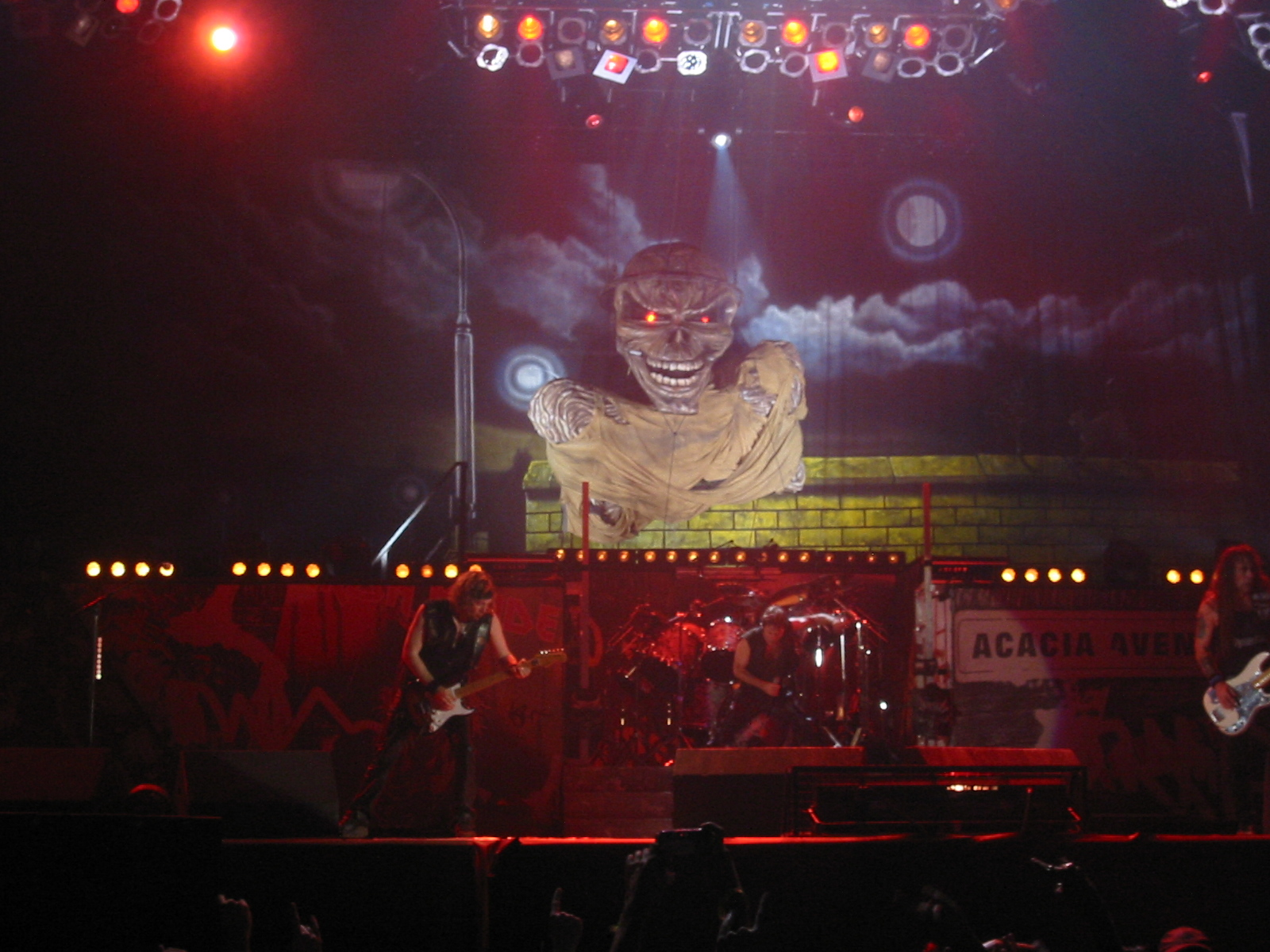
- Iron Maiden performing in Paris on 25 June 2005
- Start date: 28 May 2005
- End date: 2 September 2005
- No. of shows: 45 (3 cancellations)

Iron Maiden concert chronology
- Dance of Death World Tour (2003–2004); Eddie Rips Up the World Tour (2005); A Matter of Life and Death Tour (2006–2007)

Eddie Rips Up the World Tour was a concert tour by the English heavy metal band Iron Maiden, in support of their 2004 DVD, The History of Iron Maiden – Part 1: The Early Days.

== Background ==
The tour saw the band headlining several stadiums and festivals throughout Europe, with the concert at Ullevi Stadium in Gothenburg, Sweden on 9 July being broadcast live in full on both Swedish national television and radio, and co-headlining with Black Sabbath for the majority of the North American Ozzfest tour.

The final date of the US segment of the tour (Hyundai Pavilion in San Bernardino, California on 20 August 2005) ended on a sour note. Throughout the tour, vocalist Bruce Dickinson reportedly made several comments about reality television, the widespread use of autocue by current bands and the fact that Iron Maiden had headlined several dates of the tour (due to Ozzy Osbourne's illness), to which Osbourne's wife, Sharon, took offence. In addition, the PA system was shut off multiple times, cutting off power to Dickinson's microphone and the band's instruments mid-song and members of other bands were recruited to cause further disturbance, such as throwing eggs at Iron Maiden during their performance and by running on-stage with an American flag during "The Trooper". The effort to ruin the band's show seemed to have been in vain, however, as the band reportedly played even better as their performance was disrupted. Shortly after Iron Maiden's set, Sharon entered the stage to the unanimous boos from the crowd and stated that, while she loves Iron Maiden, Dickinson is a "prick."

Following the show, Iron Maiden's manager Rod Smallwood issued a statement condemning the incident.

== Set ==
Throughout the tour, the stage was decorated with artwork lifted from The History of Iron Maiden – Part 1: The Early Days DVD release, with the runways appearing as alleyway walls and featuring ripped-up posters from that period, such as Live at the Rainbow, and a street sign reading "Acacia Avenue".

At a small number of shows, an inflatable Eddie (identical to that of the first album cover) would appear during "Iron Maiden". However, for the majority of the tour, the giant Eddie from the Give Me Ed... 'Til I'm Dead Tour was used in its place. The walk-on Eddie would also appear during "Drifter", either in a straitjacket (as on the Piece of Mind album cover) or as a replica of the original used on "The Beast on the Road" tour.

== Opening acts ==
- Mastodon
- DragonForce
- Dream Theater
- Marilyn Manson
- Turbonegro
- In Flames
- Nightwish
- Within Temptation

== Tour dates ==
List of 2005 concerts
Date	City	Country	Venue	Attendance
28 May 2005	Prague	Czech Republic	T-Mobile Arena	
29 May 2005	Chorzów	Poland	Mystic Festival	
31 May 2005	Graz	Austria	Stadthalle	
4 June 2005	Nürburgring	Germany	Rock am Ring	
5 June 2005	Nuremberg	Germany	Rock im Park	
7 June 2005	Reykjavík	Iceland	Egilshöll	
11 June 2005	Bologna	Italy	Gods of Metal	
12 June 2005	Zürich	Switzerland	Spirit of Music Festival	
16 June 2005	Lisbon	Portugal	Pavilhão Atlântico	
18 June 2005	Murcia	Spain	Lorca Rock Festival	
21 June 2005	Athens	Greece	Terra Vibe Park	
25 June 2005	Paris	France	Parc des Princes	
26 June 2005	Dessel	Belgium	Graspop Metal Meeting	
28 June 2005	Oslo	Norway	Oslo Spektrum	
29 June 2005	Oslo	Norway	Oslo Spektrum	
2 July 2005	Leipzig	Germany	With Full Force	
3 July 2005	Weert	Netherlands	Bospop	
6 July 2005	Helsinki	Finland	Hartwall Areena	
7 July 2005	Helsinki	Finland	Hartwall Areena	
9 July 2005	Gothenburg	Sweden	Ullevi Stadium	57,000/60,000
15 July 2005	Mansfield	United States	Tweeter Center	20,100/20,100
16 July 2005	Quebec City	Canada	Colisée Pepsi (N)	
17 July 2005	Hartford	United States	New England Dodge Music Center	20,430/24,000
19 July 2005	Camden	United States	Tweeter Center at the Waterfront	23,655/25,371
21 July 2005	Corfu	United States	Darien Lake Performing Arts Center	15,044/21,800
23 July 2005	Burgettstown	United States	Post-Gazette Pavilion	21,526/23,085
24 July 2005	Bristow	United States	Nissan Pavilion	18,803/20,975
26 July 2005	Holmdel Township	United States	PNC Bank Arts Center	12,059/17,000
27 July 2005	Holmdel Township	United States	PNC Bank Arts Center	12,060/17,000
30 July 2005	Tinley Park	United States	Tweeter Center	20,794/28,644
31 July 2005	Noblesville	United States	Verizon Wireless Music Center	20,038/24,204
2 August 2005	Columbus	United States	Germain Amphitheatre	14,606/20,000
3 August 2005	Toronto	Canada	Molson Amphitheatre (N)	
4 August 2005	Clarkston	United States	DTE Energy Music Theatre	17,202/17,202
6 August 2005	East Troy	United States	Alpine Valley Music Theatre	20,575/35,072
9 August 2005	Greenwood Village	United States	Coors Amphitheater (N)	4,953/14,800
11 August 2005	Auburn	United States	White River Amphitheatre	16,923/19,536
13 August 2005	Mountain View	United States	Shoreline Amphitheatre	19,623/22,000
15 August 2005	Wheatland	United States	Sleep Train Amphitheater	
18 August 2005	Phoenix	United States	Cricket Wireless Pavilion	16,430/20,151
20 August 2005	San Bernardino	United States	Hyundai Pavilion	46,078/46,843
26 August 2005	Leeds	England	Leeds Festival	
28 August 2005	Reading	England	Reading Festival	
30 August 2005	Dublin	Ireland	Royal Dublin Society	35,000/35,000
2 September 2005	London	England	Hammersmith Apollo	

N – Non-Ozzfest show
