= Coatham Bowl =

Entertainment venue in Redcar, England

Coordinates: 54.61916°N 1.07642°W

The Coatham Bowl (later known as the Redcar Bowl) was an entertainment venue located in Redcar, England. It hosted events ranging from conferences, dances and pop concerts. The bowl was a particularly popular venue for concerts during the early-1970s to 1990s. Notable past performers include Whitesnake, Yes, Iron Maiden, Uriah Heep. In 2014 the venue was demolished.

== See also ==
- Redcar Jazz Club
