= Bracknell Leisure Centre =

Leisure centre in Bracknell, England

The Bracknell Leisure Centre (formerly Bracknell Sports Centre) is a sports and entertainment complex located at Bagshot Road in Bracknell, Berkshire, England. It was particularly popular as a concert venue between the late 1960s and early 1980s hosting bands such as Iron Maiden, U2, Genesis (twice, first time supporting Arthur Brown's Kingdom Come), Free, The Jeff Beck Group, Madness, The Specials, Haircut 100, Thin Lizzy, Traffic, Roxy Music (with Brian Eno), Status Quo, Captain Beefheart, Dr Feelgood, Wishbone Ash (twice), Stiff Little Fingers, Motorhead, Hawkwind (five times), Stranglers, Groundhogs, Rory Gallagher, Focus and Yes.
