= Carlisle Market Hall =

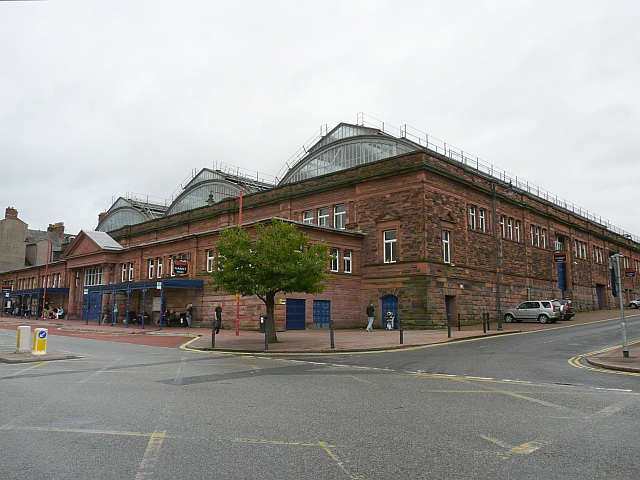
- North view of the Market Hall

- Location within Cumbria

General information
- Type: Market hall
- Location: Carlisle, Cumbria, UK
- Coordinates: 54.8960°N 2.9365°W
- Construction started: 1887

Other information
- Number of stores: approx 100

Website
- www.cumberland.gov.uk/parks-culture-and-leisure/markets/carlisle-market-hall

Carlisle Market Hall is a market hall located in Carlisle, Cumbria, England. It was built between 1887 and 1889 for Carlisle Corporation by Arthur Cawston and Joseph Graham, both of Westminster, with ironwork manufactured by Cowans, Sheldon & Company. It is one of the few covered Victorian markets remaining in the country. It has been used as a concert venue; notable past performers include Thin Lizzy, Gillan, Status Quo, Uriah Heep, The Smiths, Motörhead, Rory Gallagher, Iron Maiden, Genesis, AC/DC, The Who and Gene Vincent.

The market was redeveloped in the 1990s with the number of stalls reduced and one of the two entrances to Scotch Street closed off. The stalls are now located in the northern half (facing West Tower Street) of the hall while the rest of the building (facing Fisher Street) was at first converted into an arcade of small retail units which were never fully occupied and then replaced with a branch of TK Maxx on the first floor and a Wilko below, which has since closed.

As of 2025, Plans have been made and approved to renovate the Market Hall, including the creation of a "food hall" and performance space. This is since the purchase of the building by the Bearmont group.
