= Mayfair Ballroom =

Former music venue in Newcastle-upon-Tyne, England

Coordinates: 54.972°N 1.616°W

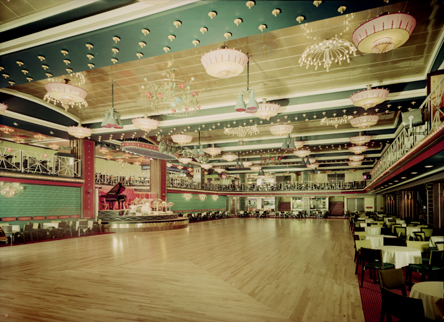
The Mayfair dance floor in 1961

Mayfair Ballroom was a ballroom and concert hall situated on Newgate Street in Newcastle upon Tyne, England. The oblong room was built to hold 1,500 people and had a small stage along one of the longer walls. It was opened in September 1961 by the Mecca organisation.

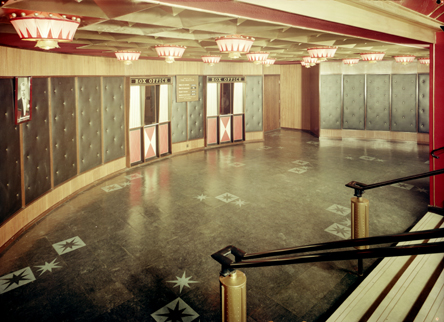
The ticket hall

Artists that played the venue, early in their careers, include AC/DC, The Who, Led Zeppelin, Free, Pink Floyd, Queen, the Police, Shy, the Prodigy, Black Grape, the Cross, Kylie Minogue, Daft Punk, Tin Machine, U2, the Clash, Iron Maiden, Metallica, Faith No More, Judas Priest, Bodycount and Nirvana, The Glitter Band among others.

Led Zeppelin's first ever live performance in the United Kingdom was at the Mayfair Ballroom on 4 October 1968, albeit billed as "The Yardbirds featuring Jimmy Page". Free's final live performance in the UK took place at the venue on 20 October 1972. At the end of the show, guitarist Paul Kossoff broke the neck of his cherished Les Paul guitar after uncharacteristically throwing it into the air in frustration.

In 1999 the Mayfair was demolished and replaced with a retail and entertainment venue called The Gate. The closing night was attended by 5,000 people.
