= Guildford Civic Hall =

Coordinates: 51°14′19″N 0°33′59″W

Guildford Civic Hall was an arts and entertainment venue in Guildford, Surrey, England. Opened in 1962, it closed in January 2004, and has since been demolished. Many famous artists performed at the Guildford Civic Hall, including Eric Clapton, Iron Maiden, Deep Purple (28 November 1969), Genesis and Dire Straits. The King Crimson album Live in Guildford was recorded at the venue on November 13, 1972. By 2010, development was underway for a new £26 million replacement facility on the same site, which opened as G Live in September 2011.

At the 1992 United Kingdom general election, the count for the Guildford constituency was held at the Civic hall.
