= Victoria Hall, Stoke-on-Trent =

Concert hall in Stoke-on-Trent, England

Victoria Hall
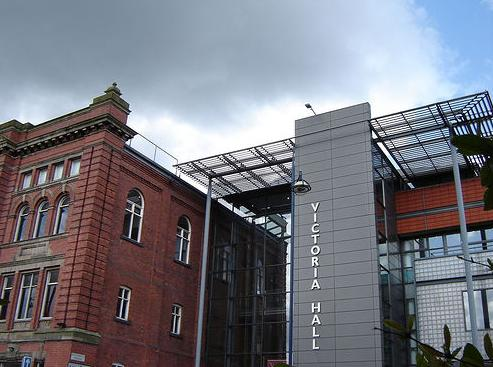
- The original redbrick and terracotta (left) against the 1999 extension (right)
- Interactive map of Victoria Hall
- Address: Bagnall Street; Stoke-on-Trent; England
- Coordinates: 53.0231°N 2.1752°W
- Owner: Ambassador Theatre Group
- Capacity: 1,467

Construction
- Opened: 1888
- Years active: 1888-present

Website
- Official Box Office

For other theatres with a similar name, see Victoria Theatre (disambiguation)

Victoria Hall is a concert hall in Hanley, Stoke-on-Trent, England. It opened in 1888, having been constructed to commemorate Queen Victoria's Jubilee the previous year. Along with the Regent Theatre, also in Hanley, it is managed by the Ambassador Theatre Group.

== History ==
Victoria Hall was constructed as an annex to Hanley Town Hall in 1888, as part of the town's celebrations for the Golden Jubilee of Queen Victoria. It was built in red brick and terracotta, and designed by local borough surveyor Joseph Lobley.

Conductors who have appeared at the hall include Edward Elgar who conducted the first performance of his composition King Olaf (Op 30). In 1996 Donald Hunt conducted the BBC Philharmonic and the Ceramic City Choir in a revival to mark the centenary of the premiere.

Recordings made in the hall include the live album by Slash Made in Stoke 24/7/11.

== Facilities ==
Originally the building had a capacity of 2,800 people, but this has since been reduced considerably to 1,467 as seating replaced wooden forms and benches.

The organ has four manuals. The original instrument was presented by George Meakin, a local businessman, who acquired it in Yorkshire. It was rebuilt and enlarged in the 1920s. The organ has since been modified more than once, but the most recent work has been aimed at restoring its 1920s tone.

As an adjunct to the town hall, the building originally had minimal front-of-house facilities. To remedy this, an extension was constructed in 1999 as part of the development of a "Cultural Quarter" in Hanley. This building interlinks with the hall, providing a new entrance space with better facilities for the audiences and performers along with access for the disabled to all parts of the house.
