= List of Iron Maiden tribute albums =

This is a list of albums recorded in tribute to the English heavy metal band Iron Maiden.

== The Maiden Years Volume 1 – Tribute to Iron Maiden ==
The Maiden Years Volume 1 – Tribute to Iron Maiden

Compilation album by various artists
- Released: 1996
- Genre: Heavy metal
- Length: 49:29
- Label: Sum Records

No.	Title	Artist	Length
1.	"Can I Play with Madness"	Steve Overland	3:25
2.	"2 Minutes to Midnight"	Steve Grimmett	5:52
3.	"Wrathchild"	Paul Di'Anno	2:55
4.	"Hallowed Be Thy Name"	Doogie White	6:54
5.	"Running Free"	Paul Di'Anno	3:10
6.	"The Evil That Men Do"	Doogie White	4:24
7.	"Phantom of the Opera"	Paul Di'Anno	6:51
8.	"The Number of the Beast"	Steve Grimmett	4:31
9.	"Iron Maiden"	Paul Di'Anno	3:47
10.	"Run to the Hills"	Steve Overland	3:34
11.	"The Trooper"	Gary John Barden	4:06

== Made in Tribute: A Tribute to the Best Band in a Whole Goddamn World! ==
Made in Tribute: A Tribute to the Best Band in a Whole Goddamn World!

Compilation album by various artists
- Released: 1998
- Genre: Heavy metal
- Length: 71:53
- Label: Adrenaline Records

Made in Tribute: A Tribute to the Best Band in a Whole Goddamn World! is the first tribute compilation to Iron Maiden and features covers from established bands such as Arch Enemy, Therion and In Flames.

No.	Title	Artist	Length
1.	"Aces High"	Arch Enemy	4:24
2.	"2 Minutes to Midnight"	Decameron	6:23
3.	"Children of the Damned"	Therion	4:29
4.	"Die With Your Boots On"	Armageddon	5:32
5.	"Wasted Years"	Nocturnal Rites	4:58
6.	"Wrathchild"	Sadist	2:29
7.	"The Trooper"	Lord Belial	3:42
8.	"The Evil That Men Do"	Naglfar	4:43
9.	"22 Acacia Avenue"	Dark Tranquillity	6:04
10.	"Murders in the Rue Morgue"	In Flames	3:09

== A Call to Irons ==
A Call to Irons

Compilation album by various artists
- Released: 5 May 1998
- Genres: Death metal, black metal, doom metal, heavy metal, blackened death metal
- Length: 71:53
- Label: Dwell Ministries

A Call to Irons is one of the earlier tribute albums released to honour the heavy metal band Iron Maiden. It includes a diverse collection of bands ranging from power metal bands like Steel Prophet to extreme progressive metal bands like Opeth.

No.	Title	Artist	Length
1.	"Ides of March/Purgatory"	Steel Prophet	5:27
2.	"Powerslave"	Ancient Wisdom	5:54
3.	"The Trooper"	Vital Remains	4:06
4.	"Genghis Khan"	Angel Corpse	3:27
5.	"Hallowed Be Thy Name"	Solitude Aeturnus	7:34
6.	"Phantom of the Opera"	New Eden	6:35
7.	"Remember Tomorrow"	Opeth	5:01
8.	"To Tame a Land"	Morgion	10:06
9.	"Strange World"	Evoken	7:00
10.	"Rime of the Ancient Mariner"	Opera IX	13:03
11.	"Transylvania"	Absu	3:42

== Transilvania 666 ==
Transilvania 666

Compilation album by various artists
- Released: 16 November 1999
- Genre: Heavy metal
- Label: Locomotive Music

Transilvania 666 is a tribute album to the heavy metal band Iron Maiden by various Spanish bands, released in 1999.

Disc 1:

1. "Run to the Hills" (Avalanch)
2. "Flight of Icarus" (Tierra Santa)
3. "Charlotte the Harlot" (Lujuria)
4. "The Evil That Men Do" (Azrael)
5. "Wasted Years" (Skunk D.F)
6. "Wrathchild" (Grass)
7. "Fear of the Dark" (Demonios)
8. "Revelations" (Twilight)

Disc 2:

1. "Strange World" (Mägo de Oz)
2. "The Trooper" (Easy Rider)
3. "Phantom of the Opera" (Ankhara)
4. "Powerslave" (Piramid)
5. "Running Free" (Tea)
6. "Holy Smoke" (Aerobitch)
7. "Moonchild" (Sentinel)
8. "Children of the Damned" (Dracon)

== A Call to Irons Vol. 2 ==
A Call to Irons Vol. 2: A Tribute to Iron Maiden

Compilation album by various artists
- Released: 26 January 1999
- Genre: Heavy metal
- Length: 58:45
- Label: Dwell

For the second Call to Irons tribute album, Dwell used an all American line up with mainly progressive/heavy/power bands. A lot of the bands featured on this album are now defunct and had few if any original releases.

No.	Title	Artist	Length
1.	"Invaders"	Engrave	3:15
2.	"Gangland"	Steel Prophet	3:52
3.	"Iron Maiden"	From The Depths	3:37
4.	"Total Eclipse"	Terror	4:19
5.	"Wrathchild"	Acheron	2:51
6.	"Revelations"	Possessions	6:06
7.	"Killers"	Ion Vein	5:18
8.	"Where Eagles Dare"	Mystic Force	6:12
9.	"2 Minutes to Midnight"	Deceased	5:45
10.	"Public Enema Number One"	31 October	3:51
11.	"Sea of Madness"	Prototype	5:52
12.	"Children of the Damned"	Diesel MacHine	4:38
13.	"Sanctuary"	Abattoir	3:10

== The Maiden Years Volume 2 – Tribute to Iron Maiden ==
The Maiden Years Volume 2 – Tribute to Iron Maiden

Compilation album by various artists
- Released: 2001
- Genre: Heavy metal
- Label: Sum Records

No.	Title	Artist	Length
1.	"Bring Your Daughter... to the Slaughter"	Doogie White
2.	"Murders in the Rue Morgue"	Paul Di'Anno
3.	"Aces High"	Steve Grimmett
4.	"Flight of Icarus"	Steve Overland
5.	"Wasted Years"	Steve Grimmett
6.	"Remember Tomorrow"	Paul Di'Anno
7.	"The Clairvoyant"	Doogie White
8.	"The Prisoner"	Steve Overland
9.	"Sanctuary"	Paul Di'Anno
10.	"Powerslave"	Steve Grimmett
11.	"Killers"	Paul Di'Anno
12.	"Fear of the Dark"	Bernie Shaw

== Numbers from the Beast ==
Numbers from the Beast

Compilation album by various artists
- Released: 11 October 2005
- Genre: Heavy metal
- Label: Rykodisc
- Producers: Bob Kulick; Brett Chassen

Numbers from the Beast is a tribute album to Iron Maiden that was released in 2005. It celebrated the band's 25th anniversary of the release of their debut album. The songs are performed by some of the leading names in heavy metal. The album is produced by Bob Kulick and Brett Chassen. The cover-art was made by Derek Riggs, creator of Maiden's mascot Eddie. Track three features former Iron Maiden lead vocalist Paul Di'Anno, who sang on the original version of the song. It used the "All-Star" Formation after the release of Roadrunner Records's "Roadrunner United", with the same premise.

No.	Title	Personnel	Length
1.	"Run to the Hills"	Personnel: Robin McAuley (McAuley Schenker Group, Survivor) – lead vocals; Michael Schenker (Scorpions, UFO, M.S.G) – lead guitar; Pete Fletcher – rhythm guitar; Tony Franklin (The Firm, Blue Murder, Whitesnake, Kenny Wayne Shepherd) – bass; Brian Tichy (Billy Idol, Foreigner, Whitesnake) – drums	4:05
2.	"Wasted Years"	Personnel: Dee Snider (Twisted Sister) – lead vocals; George Lynch (Dokken, Lynch Mob) – lead guitar; Bob Kulick (Balance, Blackthorne) – rhythm guitar; Jeff Pilson (Dokken, Dio, Foreigner) – bass; Jason Bonham (Bonham, Foreigner, UFO, Black Country Communion) – drums	5:32
3.	"Wrathchild"	Personnel: Paul Di'Anno (Iron Maiden) – lead vocals; Alex Skolnick (Testament) – lead guitar; Chris Traynor (Orange 9mm, Helmet) – rhythm guitar; Frank Bello (Anthrax) – bass; John Tempesta (Exodus, Testament, The Cult, White Zombie, Rob Zombie) – drums	3:17
4.	"Flight of Icarus"	Personnel: Tim "Ripper" Owens (Judas Priest, Iced Earth) – lead vocals; Doug Aldrich (Lion, Burning Rain, Dio, Whitesnake) – guitar; Jimmy Bain (Rainbow, Wild Horses, Dio) – bass; Simon Wright (AC/DC, Dio) – drums	4:10
5.	"Fear of the Dark"	Personnel: Chuck Billy (Testament) – lead vocals; Craig Goldy (Rough Cutt, Giuffria, Dio) – guitar; Ricky Phillips (The Babys, Angel, Bad English, Styx) – bass; Mikkey Dee (King Diamond, Motörhead) – drums	8:30
6.	"The Trooper"	Personnel: Ian "Lemmy" Kilmister (Motörhead) – lead vocals; Phil Campbell (Persian Risk, Motörhead) – guitar; Rocky George (Suicidal Tendencies, Cro-Mags) – guitar; Chuck Wright (Quiet Riot, Giuffria, House of Lords, Impellitteri) – bass; Chris Slade (The Firm, AC/DC, Asia, Tom Jones) – drums	4:06
7.	"Aces High"	Personnel: Jeff Scott Soto (Yngwie Malmsteen, Talisman, Journey) – lead vocals; Nuno Bettencourt (Extreme) – guitar; Billy Sheehan (David Lee Roth, Mr. Big, Niacin) – bass; Vinny Appice (Black Sabbath, Dio) – drums	4:58
8.	"2 Minutes to Midnight"	Personnel: Joe Lynn Turner (Rainbow, Yngwie Malmsteen, Deep Purple) – lead vocals; Richie Kotzen (Poison, Mr. Big)– guitar; Bob Kulick – rhythm guitar; Tony Franklin(The Firm, Blue Murder, Whitesnake, Kenny Wayne Shepherd) – bass; Chris Slade(The Firm) – drums	6:22
9.	"Can I Play with Madness"	Personnel: Mark Slaughter (Vinnie Vincent Invasion, Slaughter) – lead vocals; Bruce Kulick (Blackjack, Kiss) – guitar; Marco Mendoza (Blue Murder, Whitesnake, Thin Lizzy) – bass; Aynsley Dunbar (The Jeff Beck Group, Frank Zappa, Journey, Whitesnake) – drums	4:16
10.	"The Evil That Men Do"	Personnel: Chris Jericho (Fozzy) – lead vocals; Paul Gilbert (Racer X, Mr. Big) – guitar; Bob Kulick – rhythm guitar; Mike Inez (Alice in Chains, Slash's Snakepit, Heart) – bass; Brent Fitz (Union, Slash) – drums	5:27
11.	"The Wicker Man"	Personnel: John Bush (Armored Saint, Anthrax) – lead vocals; Jeff Duncan (Armored Saint) – lead guitar; Scott Ian (Anthrax) – guitar; Rob "Blasko" Nicholson (Ozzy Osbourne, Rob Zombie) – bass; Ben Graves (Murderdolls) - drums; Jason C. Miller (Godhead) – backing vocals	5:10

== Slave to the Power ==
Slave to the Power: The Iron Maiden Tribute

Compilation album by various artists
- Released: 7 March 2000
- Recorded: 22 May 1998 – September 2, 1999
- Length: 130:11
- Label: Meteor City

Slave to the Power is a tribute album to Iron Maiden.

Disc 1
No.	Title	Artist	Length
1.	"Another Life"	Solace	4:34
2.	"Children of the Damned"	Sebastian Bach	4:36
3.	"Remember Tomorrow"	Crowbar	7:00
4.	"Wrathchild"	Archie Bunker & John Perez	3:28
5.	"Powerslave"	Dofka	7:22
6.	"Moonchild"	Shallow	4:38
7.	"Total Eclipse"	Warhorse	6:08
8.	"Flight of Icarus"	Ian Parry & Kamelot	4:10
9.	"The Trooper"	Holy Mother	4:13
10.	"Aces High"	Electric Frankenstein	4:43
11.	"Purgatory"	Wardog	3:21
12.	"The Evil That Men Do"	Conquest	6:07
13.	"Alexander the Great"	Eleventh Hour	8:21

Disc 2
No.	Title	Artist	Length
1.	"Running Free"	Iron Savior	3:12
2.	"The Number of the Beast"	Tchort	5:33
3.	"Stranger in a Strange Land"	Error Seven	5:31
4.	"Invaders"	Rotors to Rust	3:47
5.	"Murders in the Rue Morgue"	Cosmosquad with Ray Alder	4:32
6.	"The Trooper"	Höyry-Kone	3:55
7.	"Wasted Years"	Fates Prophecy	5:04
8.	"Innocent Exile"	Eternal Elysium	4:49
9.	"Revelations"	Pharoah	6:50
10.	"The Prisoner"	Las Cruces	6:13
11.	"Where Eagles Dare"	The Quill	6:21
12.	"The Prophecy"	Solstice	5:34
13.	"Run to the Hills"	John West with Chris Caffery	3:56

=== Notes ===
Slave to the Power was also released as a single disc version in Japan (JVC/Victor, 2000) and South Korea (Sail Productions/Pony Canyon Korea, 2000) omitting various songs. 8 songs were licensed by Nuclear Blast for a bonus CD included with the European version of A Tribute to the Beast, Vol. 2 (2003). A 2-CD/gatefold double vinyl version containing a total of 20 was released by Century Media subsidiary People Like You Records in 2003. Russian label CD Maximum issued a 2-disc version in 2003 with all 26 songs that appeared on the original Meteor City release.

== A Tribute to the Beast ==
A Tribute to the Beast

Compilation album by various artists
- Released: 2002
- Recorded: 2002
- Genres: Heavy metal Thrash metal Death metal Power metal Black metal
- Label: Nuclear Blast

A Tribute to the Beast is a tribute album to the heavy metal band Iron Maiden that was released in 2002.

1. "The Ides of March / Purgatory" (Steel Prophet)
2. "Aces High" (Children of Bodom)
3. "The Trooper" (Rage) (Onmyo-Za in Japanese version).
4. "Hallowed Be Thy Name" (Cradle of Filth)
5. "Running Free" (Grave Digger)
6. "Prowler" (Burden of Grief)
7. "Die With Your Boots On" (Sonata Arctica)
8. "Children of the Damned" (Therion)
9. "Transylvania" (Iced Earth)
10. "Remember Tomorrow" (Opeth)
11. "The Number of the Beast" (Sinergy)
12. "Stranger in a Strange Land" (Disbelief)
13. "Flight of Icarus" (Tierra Santa)
14. "22 Acacia Avenue" (Dark Tranquillity)
15. "Wrathchild" (Six Feet Under)
16. "Powerslave" (Darkane)

== A Tribute to the Beast, Vol. 2 ==
A Tribute to the Beast Vol.2

Compilation album by various artists
- Released: 2003
- Recorded: 2003
- Genres: Heavy metal Thrash metal Death metal Power metal Black metal
- Label: Nuclear Blast

A Tribute to the Beast, Vol. 2 is a tribute album to the heavy metal band Iron Maiden that was released in 2003.

1. "Killers" (Destruction)
2. "The Trooper" (Sentenced)
3. "2 Minutes to Midnight" (Primal Fear)
4. "Wasted Years" (Thunderstone)
5. "Wrathchild" (Stuck Mojo & Devin Townsend)
6. "Remember Tomorrow" (Anthrax)
7. "Iron Maiden" (Tankard)
8. "Moonchild" (Necrophobic)
9. "Strange World" (Mägo De Oz)
10. "Déjà Vu" (Wolf)
11. "Sanctuary" (Mystic Prophecy)
12. "Fear of the Dark" (Graveworm)
13. "Revelations" (live) (Therion)
14. "Hallowed Be Thy Name" (Iced Earth)
15. "Children of the Damned" (Sebastian Bach)
16. "Run to the Hills" (John West & Chris Caffery)
17. "Murders in the Rue Morgue" (Cosmosquad & Ray Alder)
18. "Flight of Icarus" (Ian Perry & Kamelot)
19. "Another Life" (Solace)
20. "Alexander the Great" (Eleventh Hour)
21. "Purgatory" (Wardog)
22. "Running Free" (Iron Savior)

== Food for Thought ==
Food for Thought: Now That's What I Call 'Kin' Music

Compilation album by various artists
- Released: July 2005
- Recorded: 2003–2005
- Genres: Heavy metal, thrash metal, alternative rock, punk rock, jazz, disco, country
- Length: 71:03
- Label: Book of Hours Antitainment
- Producers: Henrik Johansson & Mattias Reinholdsson

Food for Thought is an Iron Maiden tribute album with a slightly different take on the band's music. It was released in July 2005 after having been worked on for two years by Swedes Henrik Johansson and Mattias Reinholdsson. It features mainly Johansson and Reinholdsson doing different genre versions of Iron Maiden songs with contributions from musician friends and acquaintances. The intention with the tribute was to make it sound like the covers were done by a bunch of very different bands which might explain the album's left field take on some of the songs.

1. "Be Quick or Be Dead"
2. "Twilight Zone"
3. "22 Acacia Avenue" (feat. Gabriela Kulka)
4. "The Angel and the Gambler"
5. "The Mercenary"
6. "The Trooper" (feat. LG Petrov of Entombed)
7. "Fortunes of War"
8. "Blood on the World's Hands"
9. "Stranger in a Strange Land"
10. "Flash of the Blade"
11. "Wildest Dreams"
12. "Futureal"
13. "The Nomad"
14. "Sanctuary" (feat. Björn Flodkvist, Enter the Hunt, ex. Candlemass)
15. "Innocent Exile"
16. "Public Enema Number One"
17. "Heaven Can Wait"
18. "Burning Ambition" (feat. Bo Lindberg of Hoven Droven)
19. "Seventh Son of a Seventh Son"

== The Piano Tribute to Iron Maiden ==
The Piano Tribute to Iron Maiden

Studio album by Scott Lavender
- Released: 2 August 2005
- Recorded: 2005
- Genres: piano instrumental music
- Length: 61:39
- Label: Vitamin Records

The Piano Tribute to Iron Maiden is a tribute album to the heavy metal band Iron Maiden that was released on 2 August 2005, from Vitamin Records, a label located in Los Angeles California. It is described as "a symphony that sounds perfect on every track when played on piano"

Recorded in early 2005 by the pianist and conductor Scott Lavender.

1. "2 Minutes to Midnight" – 6:33
2. "Wasted Years" – 5:11
3. "Can I Play with Madness" – 3:46
4. "The Trooper" – 4:54
5. "Brave New World" – 5:04
6. "Run to the Hills" – 3:49
7. "Caught Somewhere in Time" – 5:55
8. "Aces High" – 4:46
9. "Hallowed Be Thy Name" – 6:55
10. "Flight of Icarus" – 3:55
11. "Number of the Beast" – 6:02
12. "Eddie's Lament" (Original track) – 4:49

== Maiden Heaven ==
Maiden Heaven

Compilation album by various artists
- Released: 16 July 2008
- Recorded: 2008
- Genres: Heavy metal Thrash metal Alternative rock Punk rock
- Length: 74:03
- Producer: Kerrang!

Maiden Heaven: A Tribute to Iron Maiden is a tribute album to the heavy metal band Iron Maiden that was released on 16 July 2008, as a free gift with Kerrang! Issue 1219. It is described as "our tribute to Iron Maiden, which features exclusive covers by Metallica, Avenged Sevenfold, Coheed & Cambria, Trivium, Machine Head and Dream Theater" on the Kerrang! website.

Between 14 and 26 May, Kerrang! ran a competition to determine the CD's cover. The entrants were told to interpret the concept in any way they wanted, and using any tools they could. The winner would receive a year's subscription to Kerrang! and their art would feature on the cover.

On 18 June, Felipe Franco from Bogotá, Colombia was announced as the winner, and his entry (Eddie as an angel who has burst into flame, in a landscape of ash) was displayed on the Kerrang! website.

1. "Prowler" (Black Tide) – 3:53
2. "Remember Tomorrow" (Metallica) – 5:46
3. "Flash of the Blade" (Avenged Sevenfold) – 4:00
4. "2 Minutes to Midnight" (Glamour of the Kill) – 5:38
5. "The Trooper" (Coheed and Cambria) – 4:22
6. "Wasted Years" (DevilDriver) – 5:00
7. "Run to the Hills" (Sign) – 5:07
8. "To Tame a Land" (Dream Theater) – 7:16
9. "Caught Somewhere in Time" (Madina Lake) – 4:02
10. "Wrathchild" (Gallows) – 2:40
11. "Fear of the Dark" (Fightstar) – 7:13
12. "Hallowed Be Thy Name" (Machine Head) – 7:26
13. "Iron Maiden" (Trivium) – 3:42
14. "Running Free" (Year Long Disaster) – 3:14
15. "Brave New World" (Ghostlines) – 4:35

=== Volume 2 ===
A new edition of Maiden Heaven titled Maiden Heaven Volume 2: An All-Star Tribute to Iron Maiden was released in June 2016, accompanying issue 1623 of the magazine.

1. "Running Free" (Stone Sour)
2. "Speed of Light" (Reigning Days)
3. "Hallowed Be Thy Name" (Escape the Fate)
4. "Fear of The Dark" (Lonely the Brave)
5. "For The Greater Good of God" (Trivium)
6. "The Red and The Black" (Steven Battelle)
7. "The Evil That Men Do" (Creeper)
8. "The Number of The Beast" (Lower Than Atlantis)
9. "Powerslave" (Anaal Nathrakh)
10. "Aces High" (Cry Venom)
11. "Sun and Steel" (Fozzy)
12. "The Wicker Man" (Muncie Girls)
13. "The Trooper" (Heck)
14. "Remember Tomorrow" (Uncle Acid & the Deadbeats)
15. "Wasted Years" (Anathema)

== The Golden Beast ==
The Golden Beast: A Tribute from Colombia to Iron Maiden

Compilation album by various artists
- Released: 2008
- Recorded: 2008
- Genre: Heavy metal
- Label: EMI Music
- Producer: DeltaRecords - Julio Monroy

The Golden Beast is a tribute album to Iron Maiden by various Colombian bands, released in 2008. The album was recorded by Julio Monroy at DeltaRecords studios in Bogota, Colombia. Juan Arbelaez from Evenpro was the commercial producer.

1. "Wasted Years" (Sigma)
2. "Infinite Dreams" (Entropia)
3. "The Evil That Men Do" (Legend Maker)
4. "The Wicker Man" (Perpetual)
5. "Aces High" (Noiszart)
6. "Be Quick or Be Dead" (Introspeccion)
7. "Can I Play With Madness" (Terra Sur)
8. "Flight of Icarus" (Akash)

== See also ==
- Tribute album
- The Iron Maidens
- Maiden uniteD
