= Sonstorp =

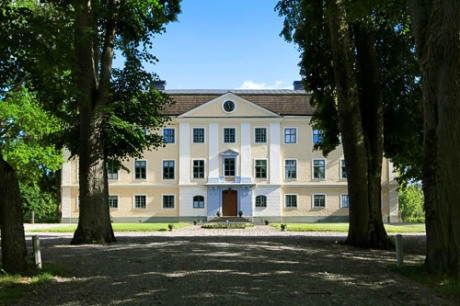
- Sonstorp Mansion

- Location within Östergötland Location within Sweden
- Coordinates: 58°43′N 15°38′E
- Country: Sweden
- Province: Östergötland
- County: Östergötland County
- Municipality: Finspång Municipality

Area
  - Total: 0.57 km^{2} (0.22 sq mi)

Population (31 December 2020)
  - Total: 430
  - Density: 750/km^{2} (2,000/sq mi)
- Time zone: UTC+1 (CET)
  - Summer (DST): UTC+2 (CEST)

Sonstorp (Swedish pronunciation: [ˈsɔ̌nːstɔrp]) is a locality situated in Finspång Municipality, Östergötland County, Sweden with 429 inhabitants in 2010.

== Sports ==
The following sports clubs are located in Finspång Municipality:

- Sonstorps IK
