= Stranger in a Strange Land (Iron Maiden song) =

Single by Iron Maiden

from the album Somewhere in Time
- B-side: "That Girl" (FM cover); "Juanita" (Marshall Fury cover)
- Released: 10 November 1986
- Recorded: 1986
- Studio: Compass Point (Nassau); Wisseloord (Hilversum)
- Genre: Heavy metal
- Length: 5:42
- Label: EMI; Capitol
- Songwriter: Adrian Smith
- Producer: Martin Birch

Iron Maiden singles chronology
"Wasted Years" (1986)	"Stranger in a Strange Land" (1986)	"Can I Play with Madness" (1988)

"Stranger in a Strange Land" is a song by the English heavy metal band Iron Maiden, released as the second single from their sixth studio album, Somewhere in Time (1986). The song is unrelated to Robert A. Heinlein's novel by the same name.

== Synopsis ==
The lyrics are about an Arctic explorer who dies and is frozen in the ice. After a hundred years his body is found preserved by other people exploring the area. Adrian Smith was inspired to write about this song after talking to an explorer who had a similar experience while discovering the frozen body of Franklin Expedition participant John Torrington.

The guitar solo in "Stranger in a Strange Land" is played by Smith. In a 2020 interview with eonmusic, the guitarist said that it was one of the first Iron Maiden songs that gave him "space to play in", citing its mid-paced tempo as the reason why; "a lot of the Maiden stuff up until then had been very fast, and aggressive, and heavy, but that actually allowed me a little bit of space to stretch out a bit", he said.

The song is one of only five Iron Maiden songs to fade out; the others being "The Prophecy" from Seventh Son of a Seventh Son, "Hell on Earth" from Senjutsu, "Women in Uniform", a single included on some pressings of Killers, and "Kill Me Ce Soir", the B-side to the 12" single Holy Smoke released in 1990. The lyrics "brave new world" were also present in Iron Maiden's 2000 studio release, Brave New World.

The music video for "Stranger in a Strange Land" was recorded between 3 November and 7 November 1986, at the Hammersmith Odeon in London, England.

== Cover details ==
Eddie's appearance on the single cover is an homage to the Clint Eastwood character "Man with No Name", although it can also be seen as a mixture of Rick Deckard from Blade Runner and the "Man with No Name". This version of Eddie would later be used in the Camp Chaos music video for "Run to the Hills".

- In the top-right corner of the cover (slightly right of Eddie's lit match), the time on the clock appears as "11:58". This is a reference to an earlier Iron Maiden single, "2 Minutes to Midnight".
- Several cards can be seen falling from the table. One (orange background, next to red-coloured card) contains a picture of the Grim Reaper, like that on "The Trooper" cover.
- Just under one of the stacks of cards, on the edge of the table, Derek Riggs' signature can be seen.
- In the music video for a later song, "The Angel and the Gambler" (from Virtual XI), then-singer Blaze Bayley is dressed up like this Eddie.

== B-sides ==
The B-sides to this single, "That Girl" and "Juanita", were both played during The Entire Population of Hackney secret gig on 19 December 1985, with Andy Barnett on lead vocals on "That Girl" and Adrian Smith on "Juanita". This is probably where the idea came from to play them as B-sides, especially with Adrian's large presence on this single and the Somewhere in Time album.

"That Girl" was written by Merv Goldsworthy, Pete Jupp and Andy Barnett in an early line-up of the band FM and was one of the demo tracks which secured them a record deal with CBS in 1984. The song was eventually released by both Iron Maiden and FM in 1986. By then the brothers Steve and Chris Overland had joined FM and some parts of the original song (mainly choruses) had been rewritten for its inclusion on FM's debut album Indiscreet, released just three weeks prior to Iron Maiden's Somewhere In Time which featured a cover of the original arrangement. On this Iron Maiden version the first guitar solo is played by Dave Murray, while the ending guitar solo is played by Adrian Smith.

"Juanita" was originally played by Barnett's band, Marshall Fury, in the early 1980s, and it was written by Steve Barnacle and Derek O'Neil. Marshall Fury never recorded a studio version of the song.

== Track listing ==
'7" single

Side one
No.	Title	Writer(s)	Length
1.	"Stranger in a Strange Land"	Adrian Smith	5:42

Side two
No.	Title	Writer(s)	Length
1.	"That Girl" (FM cover)	Merv Goldsworthy, Pete Jupp, Andy Barnett	5:02

12" single

Side one
No.	Title	Writer(s)	Length
1.	"Stranger in a Strange Land"	Smith	5:42

Side two
No.	Title	Writer(s)	Length
1.	"That Girl" (FM cover)	Goldsworthy, Jupp, Barnett	5:02
2.	"Juanita" (Marshall Fury cover)	Steve Barnacle, Derek O'Neil	3:45

== Personnel ==
Personnel as listed in the album's liner notes are:

- Bruce Dickinson – vocals
- Dave Murray – guitars, guitar synthesiser
- Adrian Smith – guitars, guitar synthesiser
- Steve Harris – bass guitar
- Nicko McBrain – drums

Production

- Martin Birch – producer, engineer, mixing
- Derek Riggs – cover illustration
- Ross Halfin – photography

== Chart performance ==
Single	Chart (1986)	Peak position	Album
"Stranger in a Strange Land"	Irish Singles Chart	18	Somewhere in Time
"Stranger in a Strange Land"	UK Singles Chart	22	Somewhere in Time
Single	Chart (1990)	Peak position	Album
"Wasted Years/ Stranger in a Strange Land"	UK Albums Chart (Note: Re-release of both singles as part of The First Ten Years box set. Exceeded the length limit of the UK Singles chart.)	9	—
