= Christin Lilja =

Swedish international footballer

Personal information
- Full name: Christin Marie Lilja
- Date of birth: 7 January 1975 (age 51)

Senior career*
Years	Team	Apps	(Gls)
1997	Lotorps IF		
1998–2000	Athene Moss	43	(39)

International career
	Sweden	9	(2)
- * Club domestic league appearances and goals

Christin Lilja (born 7 January 1975) is a Swedish former footballer. She was a member of the Sweden national team that reached the semi-finals of UEFA Women's Euro 1997.

Lilja played club football for Lotorps IF in the Damallsvenskan before joining clubs in Norway.

After she retired from playing football, Lilja became a coach. She is an assistant manager with IFK Norrköping DFK.
