= Closer to Your Heart =

Closer to Your Heart may refer to:

- "Closer to Your Heart" (Clannad song), 1985
- "Closer to Your Heart" (Natalie Grant song), 2014
- "Closer to Your Heart", a 2004 song by The Ladder on Future Miracles
