= Wilhelmine Schröder =

Fredrika Vilhelmina "Wilhelmine" Augusta Schröder (23 September 1839 – 13 May 1924), was a Swedish telegraphist, writer and journalist, and was also the confidant and royal mistress of King Charles XV of Sweden.

== Biography ==
Wilhelmine Schröder was born in Hörsholm in Denmark as the daughter of Johan Peter Schröder (d. 1850) and Louise Augusta von Götsche. She had two sisters, Sophia (1835-1856) and Emma Thora (1837-1926). The family moved to the mansion Widröra in Ottarp parish in Scania in Sweden in 1846, where her father became the manager of the estate for Major von Müehlefeld. Her father and von Müehlefeld came to be involved in a conflict in 1847 and the process between von Müehlefeld and the Schröder family continued for many years, also after the death of her father, which ruined the family.

Schröder allegedly met Charles XV when she met him in an audience regarding a murder attempt of her father, who died a couple of years after the attempt. It is known that she contacted him in 1860 and sought assistance in the family process with von Müehlefeld, but it is unknown if she met him in person at that occasion. Their first confirmed meeting is from 1866, when she moved to Hällestad with her sister. Charles fell in love with her and courted her for several years until she agreed to a relationship on the condition that she remain financially independent and retain her job at the telegraph office in Hällestad rather than being "kept" by him. In reality, however, she is not listed as having a job as a post official in the registers: her sister is listed as working at the telegraph office, but Wilhelmine herself is only listed as a mamsell. In 1869, she moved to Stockholm when she tired of travelling between the cities, but allegedly took the same job in the capital, still refusing to be supported by Charles. Charles did, however, give her an apartment at Drottninggatan 72. She is described as having been independent, serious, and practical, though she had a great interest in the supernatural and in spiritualism. Charles was fascinated by her interests, discussed existential issues with her, and called her "a priestess of pure and holy love", with whom he sought "forgiveness for his sins". Their relationship lasted until Charles's death in 1872. Charles left his brother, who succeeded him, with instructions that Schröder should be financially provided for after his death, but she continued to insist on her economic independence.

Schröder was a journalist and contributed in the Tidskrift för Hemmet: exactly when is hard to confirm because journalists in this era often wrote anonymously and did not sign their articles. In 1902, she published a book about the supernatural, Från det fördolda. Borg- och folksagor ("From the Hidden: Castle- and folktales"). She also wrote an unpublished manuscript about her relationship with the monarch entitled Den trogna (The Faithful), dated 1918. She lived in Solna in 1873–76, and then in Confidencen close to Ulriksdal Palace until her death. She shared Confidencen with her mother for several years and from 1916 she lived with her sister, who became her heir.

She died at Ulriksdal in 1924 shortly before the age of 85.
