= Albin Carlson =

Swedish ice hockey player

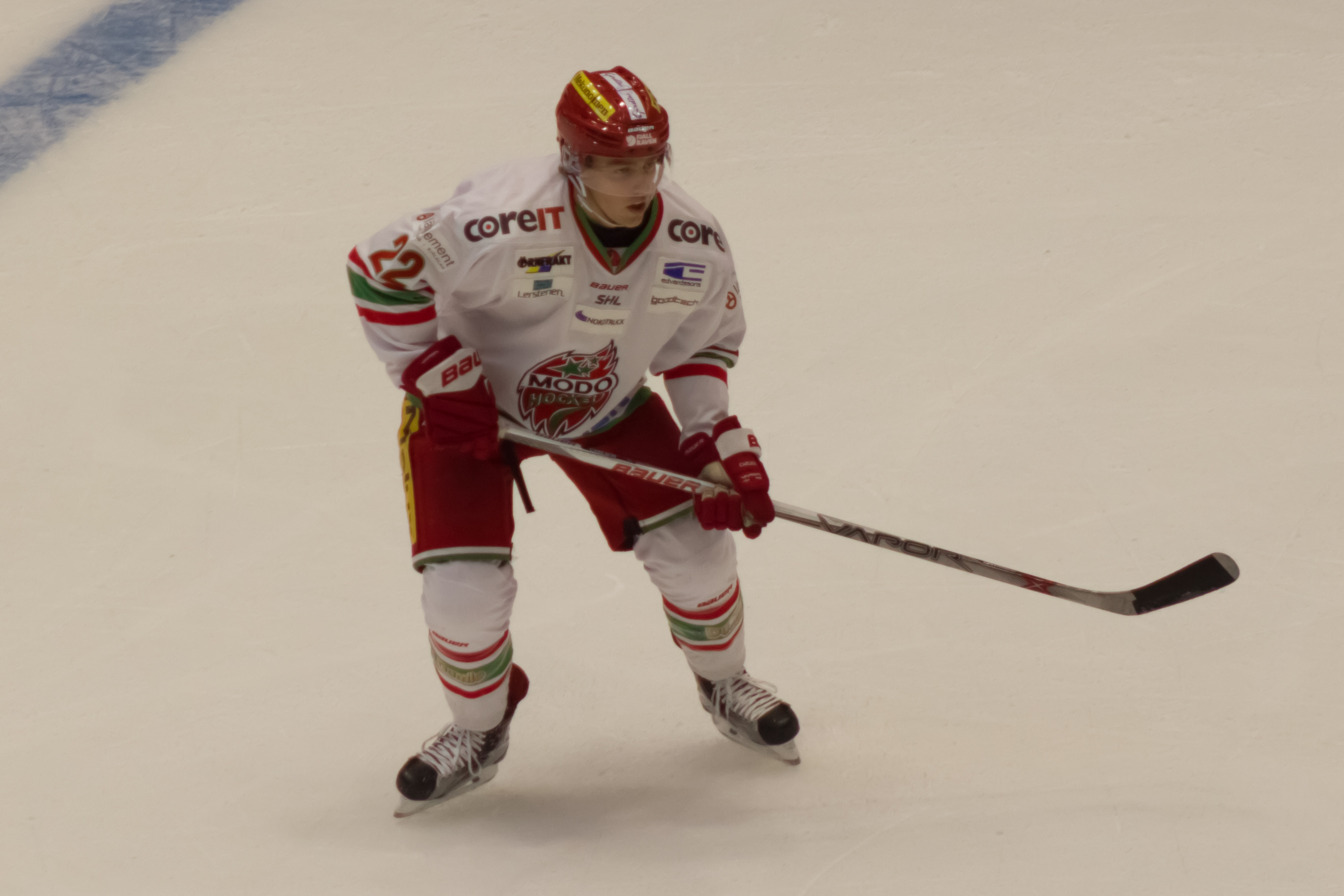
- Karlsson playing for Modo Hockey in October 2015.
- Born: March 15, 1994 (age 31) Finspång, Sweden
- Height: 5 ft 10 in (178 cm)
- Weight: 185 lb (84 kg; 13 st 3 lb)
- Position: Defence
- Shoots: Left
- Allsv team Former teams: Södertälje SK; MoDo Hockey; Timrå IK
- Playing career: 2013–present

Albin Carlson (born March 15, 1994) is a Swedish professional ice hockey defenceman. He is currently playing for Södertälje SK of the HockeyAllsvenskan (Allsv).

He has formerly played in the SHL with Modo Hockey. On April 6, 2016, Karlsson signed a two-year contract with Almtuna IS of the Allsvenskan. Following the completion of his contract with Almtuna, Karlsson then played four seasons with Timrå IK.
