= Take It to the Streets =

Take It to the Streets may refer to:

- Take It to the Streets (Curtis Mayfield album), 1990
- Take It to the Streets (The Angels album), 2012
- "Take It to the Streets" (song), a 1997 song by Rampage featuring Billy Lawrence

== See also ==
- Takin' It to the Streets (disambiguation)
