= The Ladder (band) =

UK musical group

The Ladder British Electro-Industrial Trance act, Formed in 2004 by Addz 'Vindicare' Milner to be later joined by Danny Dellamorte & Katarina to complete the line-up, The Ladder fuses various electronic genres to create multi-timbrel soundscape's somewhat different from similar artists within the Industrial and EBM music genre.

In 2013 The band has released a 6-track E.P. named Charade.

The name 'The Ladder' is a reference to the film Jacob's Ladder in which 'The Ladder' is a fictional experimental drug used in the Vietnam war to enhance a soldiers fighting ability by inducing the primeval rage of man.

The Ladder British hard rock group. The band is composed of three past members of the group FM, Steve Overland, Pete Jupp and Bob Skeat along with former Dare/Ten guitarist Vinny Burns. The band has released two studio albums, Future Miracles in 2004 and Sacred in 2007. Originally thought to be an FM reunion, the group decided not to use that name for what was termed "political reasons", as well as seeking a fresh approach.

== Personnel ==
The Ladder (Industrial act)

- AddZ Vindicare (synths & vocals)
- Danny Dellemorte (lead vocals)
- Katarina Ängst (synths)

The Ladder (hard rock band)

- Steve Overland – lead and backing vocals
- Pete Jupp – drums and percussion
- Bob Skeat – bass guitar
- Vinny Burns – guitars – 2004
- Gerhard Pichler – guitars – 2007

== Discography ==
The Ladder (industrial act)

- The Ladder EP (2008)
- Charade (2013)

Remixes by The Ladder (industrial act)

- Flesh eating Foundation – Godless (the ladder mix)
- Global Citizen – Teatime (the ladder mix)
- State of Union – Dancing in the Dark (the ladder remix)
- Solitary Experiments – Rise and Fall (the ladder remix)
- Ext!ze – Electronic Revolt (the ladder remix)
- Surgyn – Sharp as Stars (Acidic Lobotomy Remix by the Ladder)

The Ladder (hard rock)

- Future Miracles (2004)
- Sacred (2007)
