= Tough It Out =

Studio album by FM
- Released: October 2, 1989
- Recorded: CBS Rooftop Studios (London); Air Studios (London)
- Genre: Hard rock
- Length: 47:09
- Label: Epic
- Producer: Neil Kernon

FM chronology
Indiscreet (1986)	Tough It Out (1989)	Takin' It to the Streets (1991)

Professional ratings
Review scores
Source	Rating
Allmusic	3/5 stars

Tough it Out is the second studio album by the British hard rock band FM, released in 1989 on the Epic Records label, the follow-up album to the band's first album, Indiscreet (1986).

== Critical reception ==
The British music newspaper Music Week gave very positive response to the album. Kirk Blows called it a "triumphant return". In his view, compared to Indiscreet, "FM have succeeded in marrying the polish of their debut with the cut and thrust that was previously lacking, to create finely crafted, melodic rock with universal appeal".

== Track listing ==
1. "Tough It Out" - 5:36 (S. Overland/C. Overland/J. Harms)
2. "Don't Stop" - 3:53 (M. Goldsworthy/P. Jupp/D. Digital)
3. "Bad Luck" - 4:07 (S. Overland/C. Overland/Desmond Child)
4. "Someday (You'll Come Running)" - 3:57 (J. Randall/R. Randall/T. Sciuto)
5. "Everytime I Think of You" - 4:37 (S. Mullen/J. Cesario/G. Jones)
6. "Burning My Heart Down" - 4:01 (S. Overland/C. Overland/D. Child)
7. "The Dream That Died" - 4:36 (S. Overland/C. Overland)
8. "Obsession" - 4:08 (M. Goldsworthy/P. Jupp/D. Digital)
9. "Can You Hear Me Calling?" - 3:40 (S. Overland/C. Overland)
10. "Does It Feel Like Love" - 4:21 (S. Overland/C. Overland)
11. "Feels So Good" - 4:13 (S. Overland/C. Overland)

=== 2005 remaster bonus tracks ===
12. "Let Love Be the Leader" - 3:45
13. "Love Lasts Forever" - 3:52
14. "This Could Be the Last Time" - 3:44
15. "Hurt is Where the Heart is" - 3:58
16. "Everytime We Touch" - 4:46
17. "Let Love Be the Leader (Live)" - 6:36
18. "Frozen Heart (Live)" - 5:09

=== 2012 remaster bonus tracks ===
12. "Hurt is Where the Heart is" - 3:58
13. "This Could be the Last Time" - 3:44
14. "Someday (Extended)" - 5:22
15. "Alibi" - 3:50
16. "Everytime We Touch" - 4:46

== Personnel ==
- Steve Overland - lead vocals, guitar
- Merv Goldsworthy - bass guitar, backing vocals
- Pete Jupp - drums, backing vocals
- Chris Overland - lead guitar
- Didge Digital - keyboards
- Background vocals by "The Abrasive Brothers" (Merv, Pete, Steve and Terry Brock)
- Background vocals on "Someday" - "The Abrasive Brothers" and Robin Beck

== Production ==
- Produced by Neil Kernon
- Mixed by Nigel Green
- Recorded at CBS Rooftop Studios (London) and Air Studios (London)
- Mixed at Battery Studios (London)
- Assisted by Richard Hollywood, Karen Down and Andrew (Carb) Canelle (Rooftop), Matt Howe and Rupert Coulson (Air) and (Def) Geoff Hunt (Battery)

== Charts ==
=== Weekly charts ===
Weekly chart performance for Tough It Out
Chart (1989)	Peak position
Swedish Albums (Sverigetopplistan)	30
UK Albums (OCC)	34
