= Grytgöl =

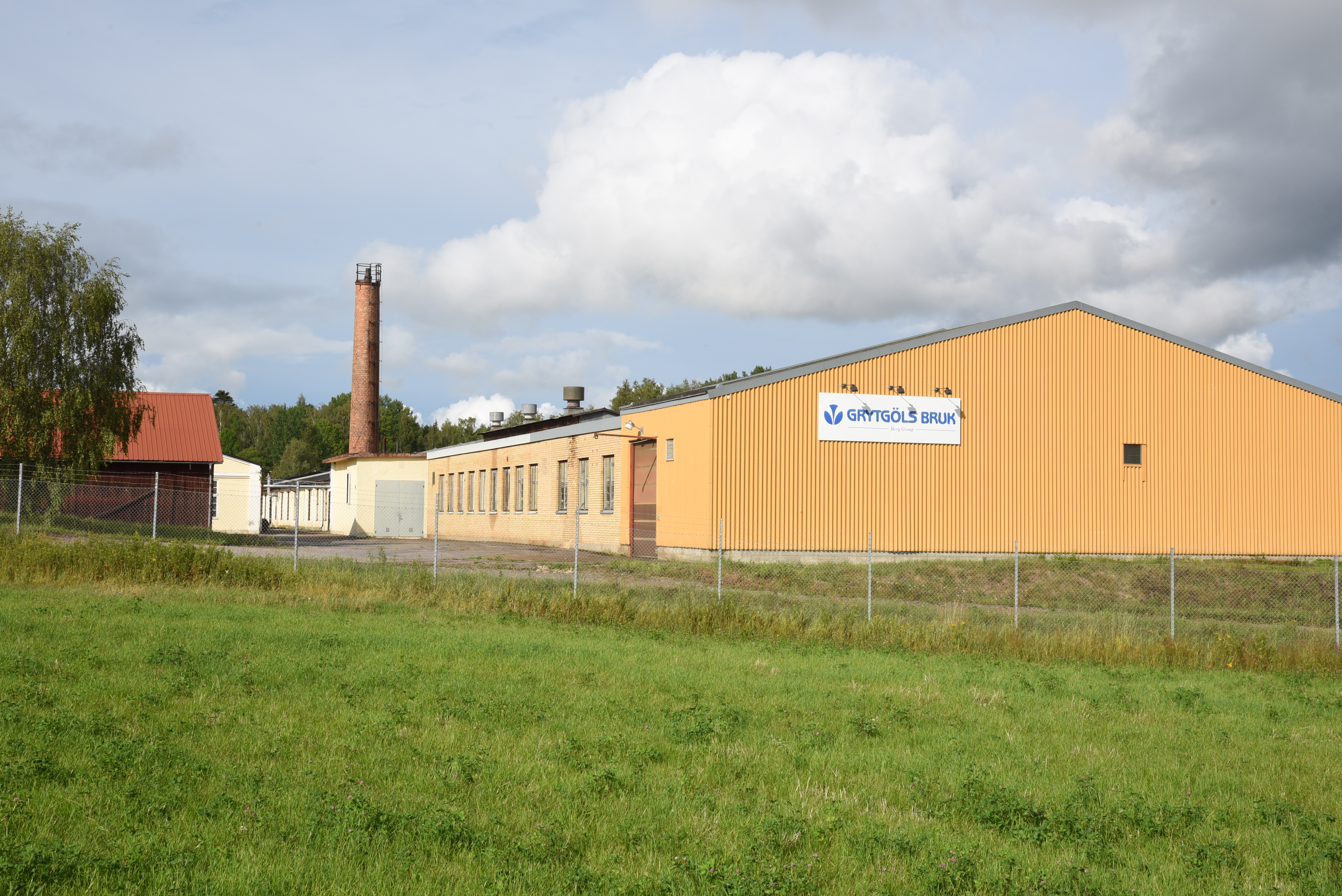

- Location within Östergötland Location within Sweden
- Coordinates: 58°48′N 15°33′E
- Country: Sweden
- Province: Östergötland
- County: Östergötland County
- Municipality: Finspång Municipality

Area
  - Total: 0.72 km^{2} (0.28 sq mi)

Population (31 December 2020)
  - Total: 323
  - Density: 450/km^{2} (1,200/sq mi)
- Time zone: UTC+1 (CET)
  - Summer (DST): UTC+2 (CEST)

Grytgöl is a locality situated in Finspång Municipality, Östergötland County, Sweden with 263 inhabitants in 2010.
