= Borggård =

- Location within Östergötland Location within Sweden
- Coordinates: 58°44′N 15°32′E
- Country: Sweden
- Province: Östergötland
- County: Östergötland County
- Municipality: Finspång Municipality

Area
  - Total: 0.42 km^{2} (0.16 sq mi)

Population (31 December 2020)
  - Total: 259
  - Density: 620/km^{2} (1,600/sq mi)
- Time zone: UTC+1 (CET)
  - Summer (DST): UTC+2 (CEST)

Borggård is a locality situated in Finspång Municipality, Östergötland County, Sweden with 238 inhabitants in 2010.
