= Igelfors =

- Location within Östergötland Location within Sweden
- Coordinates: 58°51′N 15°41′E
- Country: Sweden
- Province: Östergötland
- County: Östergötland County
- Municipality: Finspång Municipality

Area
  - Total: 0.64 km^{2} (0.25 sq mi)

Population (31 December 2020)
  - Total: 221
  - Density: 350/km^{2} (890/sq mi)
- Time zone: UTC+1 (CET)
  - Summer (DST): UTC+2 (CEST)

Igelfors is a locality situated in Finspång Municipality, Östergötland County, Sweden with 214 inhabitants in 2010.

== See also ==
- Igelfors Bruk
