= Ljusfallshammar =

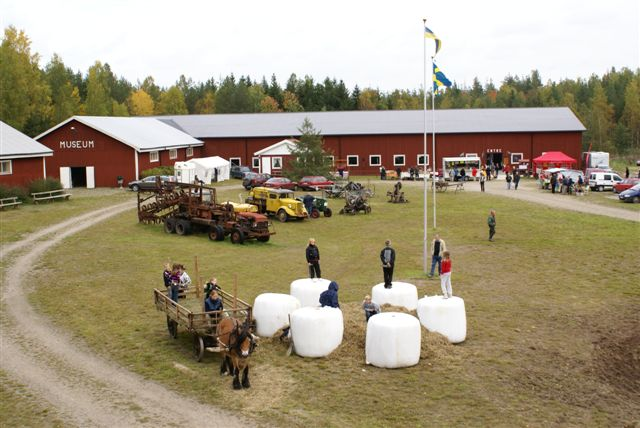

- Location within Östergötland Location within Sweden
- Coordinates: 58°47′N 15°29′E
- Country: Sweden
- Province: Östergötland
- County: Östergötland County
- Municipality: Finspång Municipality

Area
  - Total: 0.65 km^{2} (0.25 sq mi)

Population (31 December 2010)
  - Total: 327
  - Density: 499/km^{2} (1,290/sq mi)
- Time zone: UTC+1 (CET)
  - Summer (DST): UTC+2 (CEST)

Ljusfallshammar is a locality situated in Finspång Municipality, Östergötland County, Sweden with 327 inhabitants in 2010.
