= Dead Man's Shoes (FM album) =

Studio album by FM
- Released: 1995
- Recorded: Chapel Studios (Lincolnshire); Rotunda Studios (Berkshire)
- Genre: Rock
- Length: 49:22
- Label: Raw Power
- Producer: Andy Reilly, FM

FM chronology
Only the Strong - The Best of FM (1994)	Dead Man's Shoes (1995)	Paraphernalia (1996)

Professional ratings
Review scores
Source	Rating
Allmusic	3/5 stars

Dead Man's Shoes is a studio recorded album released by British AOR/hard rock band FM. Dead Man's Shoes was released in 1995 on the Raw Power record label.

== Track listing ==
1. "Nobody's Fool" (Overland, Goldsworthy, Jupp, Barnett, Davis) - 5:33
2. "Ain't No Cure for Love" (Overland, Goldsworthy, Jupp, Barnett, Davis) - 4:16
3. "Get Ready" (Smokey Robinson) - 3:57
4. "Don't Say" (Overland, Goldsworthy, Jupp, Barnett, Davis) - 4:28
5. "Mona" (Overland, Goldsworthy, Jupp, Barnett, Davis) - 4:55
6. "Sister" (Overland, Goldsworthy, Jupp, Barnett, Davis) - 4:39
7. "You're the One" (Overland, Goldsworthy, Jupp, Barnett, Davis) - 5:32
8. "Tattoo Needle" (Overland, Goldsworthy, Jupp, Barnett, Davis) - 5:11
9. "Misery" (Overland, Goldsworthy, Jupp, Barnett, Davis) - 5:53
10. "Dead Man's Shoes" (Overland, Goldsworthy, Jupp, Barnett, Davis) - 4:58

== Personnel ==
- Steve Overland - Lead vocals, guitar
- Merv Goldsworthy - Bass, vocals
- Pete Jupp - Drums, vocals
- Andy Barnett - Lead guitar, vocals
- Jem Davis - Keyboards

== Production ==
- Produced by Merv Goldsworthy, Steve Overland, Pete Jupp, Andy Barnett, Jem Davis and Andy Reilly
- Mixed by Andy Reilly
- Engineered by Andy Reilly and Andy Barnett
- Assisted by Steve Clow
- Recorded at Chapel Studios (Lincolnshire) and Rotunda Studios (Berkshire)
