= Indiscreet (FM album) =

Studio album by FM
- Released: 8 September 1986
- Recorded: Mediterranean Studios (Ibiza); Comforts Place (Surrey); Livingston Recording Studios (London).
- Genre: Hard rock
- Length: 40:21
- Label: Portrait
- Producers: Dave King, FM

FM chronology
Indiscreet (1986)	Tough It Out (1989)

Singles from Indiscreet
- 1. "Frozen Heart"

Professional ratings
Review scores
Source	Rating
AllMusic	3.5/5 stars
Record Mirror	3/5 stars

Indiscreet is the debut album from British hard rock band FM. Indiscreet was originally released in 1986 on the Portrait Records label, a sister label of Epic Records. The song "Frozen Heart" became a moderately successful single. The song "That Girl" was covered by Iron Maiden as a B-side to their single "Stranger in a Strange Land" following its inclusion in a live set by The Entire Population of Hackney (featuring Andy Barnett, erstwhile and future FM member and friend of Maiden guitarist Adrian Smith). Written by Merv Goldsworthy, Pete Jupp and Andy Barnett in an early FM line-up, it was one of the demo songs which secured FM their record contract with Portrait/Epic in 1984. By the time Indiscreet was released FM had re-written parts of their song, while Iron Maiden's release three weeks later covered the original arrangement.

== Track listing ==
No.	Title	Writer(s)	Length
1.	"That Girl"	Merv Goldsworthy, Pete Jupp, Andy Barnett	3:55
2.	"Other Side of Midnight"	Goldsworthy, Jupp	4:07
3.	"Love Lies Dying"	Goldsworthy, Steve Overland, Jupp, Chris Overland, Didge Digital	4:46
4.	"I Belong to the Night" (Swapped with "Frozen Heart" on some releases)	S. Overland, C. Overland	4:17
5.	"American Girls"	S. Overland, C. Overland	4:06
6.	"Hot Wired"	Goldsworthy	4:49
7.	"Face to Face"	S. Overland, C. Overland, Jupp	4:37
8.	"Frozen Heart" (Swapped with "I Belong to the Night" on some releases)	Goldsworthy, S. Overland, C. Overland, Jupp, Digital	5:07
9.	"Heart of the Matter"	S. Overland, C. Overland	4:27
Total length:			40:21

=== 2005 remaster bonus tracks ===
No.	Title	Length
10.	"Captured"
11.	"Alibi"
12.	"Hold On to the Night"
13.	"American Girls (Live)"
14.	"Face to Face (Live)"
15.	"Other Side of Midnight (Live)"
16.	"Say It Like It Is (Live)"
17.	"Dangerous (Live)"

=== 2012 remaster bonus tracks ===
Disc One

No.	Title	Length
10.	"Other Side of Midnight (BBC Session)"
11.	"Face to Face (BBC Session)"
12.	"That Girl (BBC Session)"
13.	"Dangerous (BBC Session)"
14.	"Frozen Heart (Live)"

Disc Two

No.	Title	Length
1.	"Frozen Heart (Extended)"
2.	"Captured"
3.	"American Girls (Live)"
4.	"Say It Like It Is (Live)"
5.	"American Girls (Instrumental)"
6.	"Let Love Be the Leader"
7.	"Let Love Be the Leader (Extended)"
8.	"Let Love Be the Leader (Live)"
9.	"Other Side of Midnight (Live)"
10.	"Face to Face (Live)"
11.	"Bad Luck (Extended)"
12.	"Addicted to Love (Live)"
13.	"Hot Legs (Live)"

== Personnel ==
- Steve Overland – Lead vocals, guitar
- Merv Goldsworthy – Bass, backing vocals
- Pete Jupp – Drums, backing vocals
- Chris Overland – Lead guitar
- Didge Digital – Keyboards

== Production ==
Produced, arranged and engineered by Merv Goldsworthy, Steve Overland, Pete Jupp, Chris Overland, Didge Digital and Dave King.
Assisted by Alan Moulder, Pete Woodroffe, George Shilling and Mark Robinson.
Recorded at Mediterranean Studios (Ibiza), Comforts Place (Surrey) and Livingston Studios (London).
