= Tierra Santa (band) =

Spanish heavy metal band

- Origin: La Rioja, Spain
- Genres: Heavy metal; Power metal; Hard rock
- Years active: 1997–2008, 2010–present
- Labels: Locomotive Music; Maldito Records
- Members: Ángel San Juan; Roberto Gonzalo; Juan Antonio San Martín; Dan Díez; Francisco Gonzalo Castillo
- Past members: Tomy; Óscar Muñoz; Paco Francisco; Iñaki Fernández; Mikel G. Otamendi; Arturo Morras; David Karrika; Eduardo Zamora

Tierra Santa is a Spanish heavy metal band from La Rioja, Spain. The band was formed in 1991 as "Privacy", and changed its name to Tierra Santa (which means "Holy Land", because of their middle-age themed lyrics) in 1997. The band released their debut album Medieval that same year, touring with Dio as an opening act on the American band's Spanish tour. From then on, together with bands such as Mägo de Oz, Saratoga or Avalanch, Tierra Santa became one of the main exponents of the heavy/power metal sung in Spanish that spread at the end of the 20th century, as well as one of the essential bands of Spanish metal in general, achieving success both in their native country and in Latin America. In 2004 they toured through the United States for the first time.

== Band Members ==
Current

- Ángel San Juan – lead vocals, rhythm guitar (1997–2008, 2010–present)
- Dan Díez – lead guitar (2017–present)
- Roberto Gonzalo – bass (1997–2008, 2010–present)
- Francisco Gonzalo Castillo – drums (2020–present)
- Juanan San Martín – keyboards (2010–present)

Past

- Arturo Morras – lead guitar (1997–2008, 2010–2014)
- Eduardo Zamora – lead guitar (2014–2017)
- Iñaki Fernández – drums (1997–2006)
- David Karrika – drums (2006–2008, 2010–2020)
- Tomy – keyboards (1997–1998)
- Óscar Muñoz – keyboards (1998–2000)
- Paco Francisco– keyboards (2000–2002)
- Mikel G. Otamendi – keyboards (2002–2008)

== Discography ==
=== Studio albums ===
- Medieval (1997)
- Legendario (1999, dedicated to Gabriel Crescioni)
- Tierras de Leyenda (2000, dedicated to Allison Joyner)
- Sangre de Reyes (2001)
- Indomable (2003)
- Apocalipsis (2004)
- Mejor Morir en Pie (2006)
- Caminos de Fuego (2010)
- Mi Nombre Será Leyenda (2013)
- Quinto Elemento (2017)
- Destino (2022)
- Un Viaje Épico (2024)

=== Live albums ===
- Las Mil y Una Noches (2003)
- Gillman Fest 2018 (2018)
- Todos Somos Uno (2023)

=== Compilation albums ===
- 1997 - 2007 (2007)
- Esencia (2014)

=== DVDs ===
- Cuando la Tierra toca el Cielo (2001)
- Las Mil y Una Noches (2003)
- Todos Somos Uno (2023)

=== Collaborations ===
- Larga vida al Volumen Brutal (Tribute to Barón Rojo)
- A Tribute to the Beast (Tribute to Iron Maiden)
- The Music Remains the Same (Tribute to Led Zeppelin)
- Transilvania 666 (Tribute to Iron Maiden)
- Luchando hasta el final (Zenobia album with Ángel's collaboration)
- El poder del deseo (Lujuria album with Ángel's collaboration)
- Meridiam (Meridiam album with Ángel's collaboration)
