= Finspång =

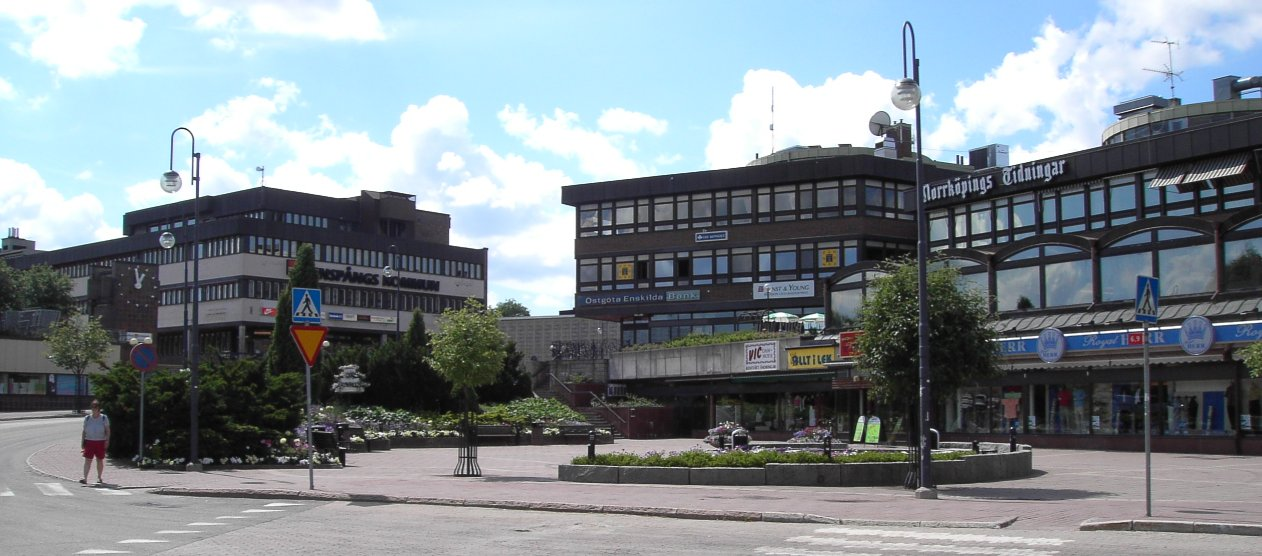
- Bergslagstorget in central Finspång

- Location within Östergötland Location within Sweden
- Coordinates: 58°42′N 15°48′E
- Country: Sweden
- Province: Östergötland
- County: Östergötland County
- Municipality: Finspång Municipality

Area
  - Total: 8.18 km^{2} (3.16 sq mi)

Population (31 December 2020)
  - Total: 13,261
  - Density: 1,620/km^{2} (4,200/sq mi)
- Time zone: UTC+1 (CET)
  - Summer (DST): UTC+2 (CEST)

Finspång (Swedish pronunciation: [ˈfɪ̂nːspɔŋ]) is a locality and the seat of Finspång Municipality, Östergötland County, Sweden with 12,440 inhabitants in 2010.

== Overview ==
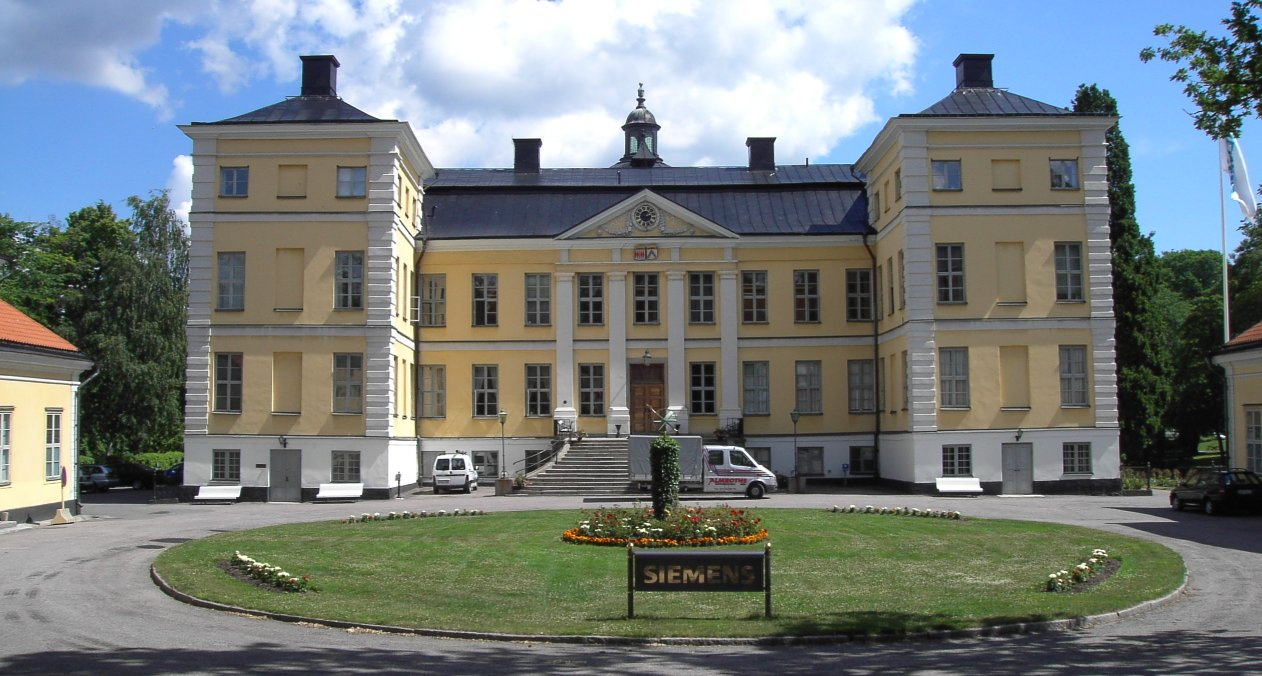
Finspång Castle.

Finspång is a traditional industrial town. The first industries were established in 1580 when a Royal factory for cannon and cannon balls was chartered. The industry was to continue for 300 years under supervision of the Walloon/Dutch family De Geer. Anders Qvarfordt was employed by Count Louis de Geer. His assignment was "to lodge and feed the Count de Geers Vallon blacksmiths". Finspång Castle was built by Louis De Geer (1622–1695), and around it industries and an orangery developed into the town of Finspång.

In the late 19th century Bofors steel works, which initially supplied forgings and castings to the factory, started to expand into the weapons business. With Alfred Nobel's help, by the 1911 AB Bofors-Gullspång had outcompeted, bought and closed down its competitor.

When in 1913 a turbine plant STAL was founded in the town, both good metalwork facilities and skilled labor were available. In 1916 the company became a subsidiary of ASEA.

Today the two main industrial areas are those of Siemens Energy turbines and metal processing.

Administratively Finspång remained part of the rural municipality Risinge until 1942, when it was made a market town (köping). Since 1971 it is the seat of the enlarged Finspång Municipality.

== Notable people ==
- Dan Swanö, Musician
- Tony Särkkä, Musician
- Pär Arvidsson, Swimmer
- Bengt Baron, Swimmer
- Liselotte Neumann, golfer. Winner of 25 professional golf tournaments
- Bertil Andersson, academic leader
- Charles De Geer born 1720, noted naturalist, entomologist, industrialist and civil servant
- Artur Svennson, athlete
- Sören Cratz, association football manager

== Sports ==
The following sports clubs are located in Finspång Municipality:

- Sonstorps IK
- Finspångs FK
- Finspångs SOK
- Finspångs AIK

== Twinnings ==
- Joutsa, Finland
