= Butbro =

- Location within Östergötland Location within Sweden
- Coordinates: 58°43′N 15°50′E
- Country: Sweden
- Province: Östergötland
- County: Östergötland County
- Municipality: Finspång Municipality

Area
  - Total: 0.46 km^{2} (0.18 sq mi)

Population (31 December 2010)
  - Total: 261
  - Density: 571/km^{2} (1,480/sq mi)
- Time zone: UTC+1 (CET)
  - Summer (DST): UTC+2 (CEST)

Butbro is a locality situated in Finspång Municipality, Östergötland County, Sweden with 261 inhabitants in 2010.
