= Finspång Municipality =

Finspång Municipality Finspångs kommun
- Municipality
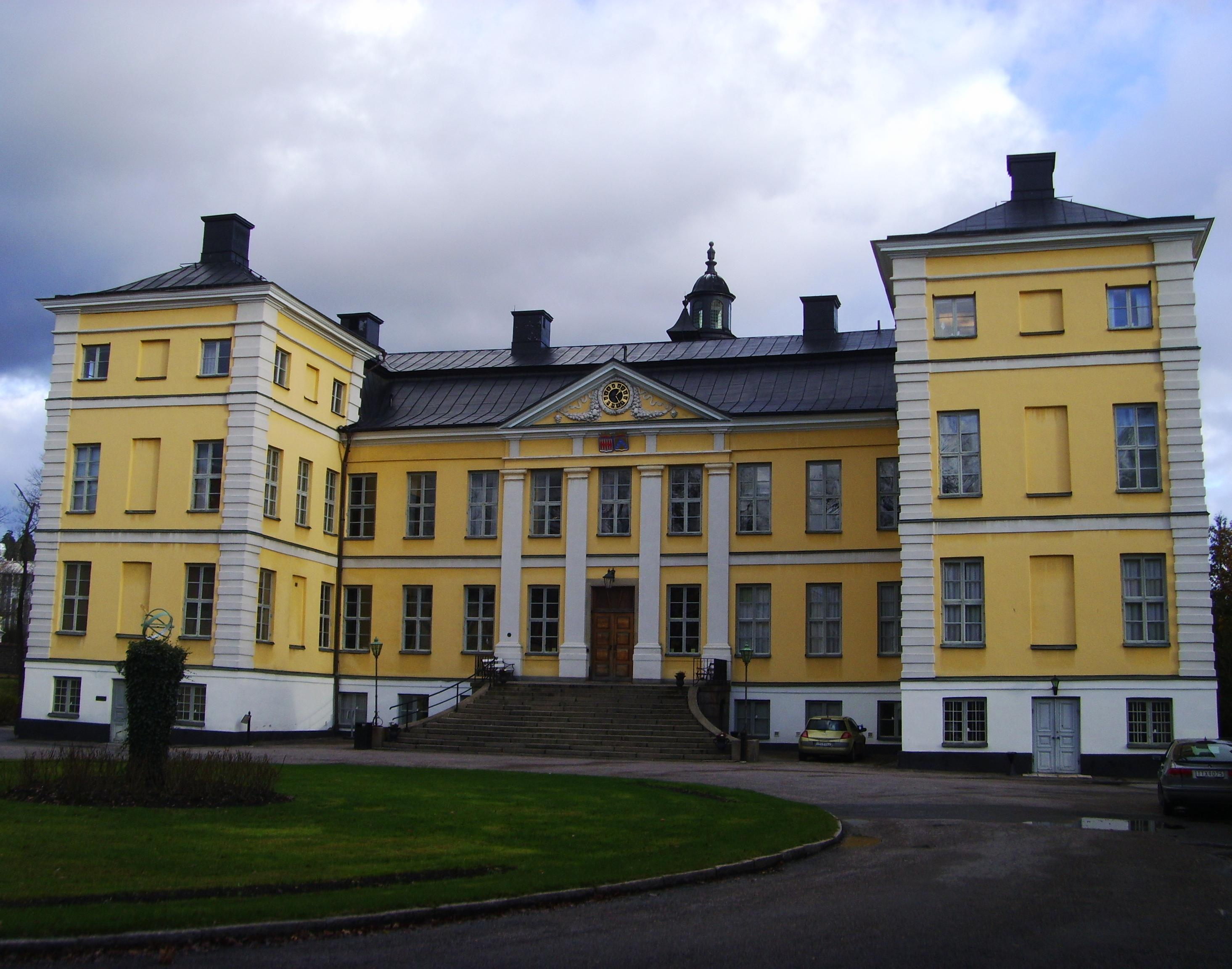
- Finspång Castle

- Coat of arms

- Coordinates: 58°42′N 15°48′E
- Country: Sweden
- County: Östergötland County
- Seat: Finspång

Area
  - Total: 1,215.05 km^{2} (469.13 sq mi)
  - Land: 1,055.28 km^{2} (407.45 sq mi)
  - Water: 159.77 km^{2} (61.69 sq mi)
- Area as of 1 January 2014.

Population (30 June 2025)
  - Total: 21,582
  - Density: 20.451/km^{2} (52.969/sq mi)
- Time zone: UTC+1 (CET)
  - Summer (DST): UTC+2 (CEST)
- ISO 3166 code: SE
- Province: Östergötland
- Municipal code: 0562
- Website: www.finspong.se

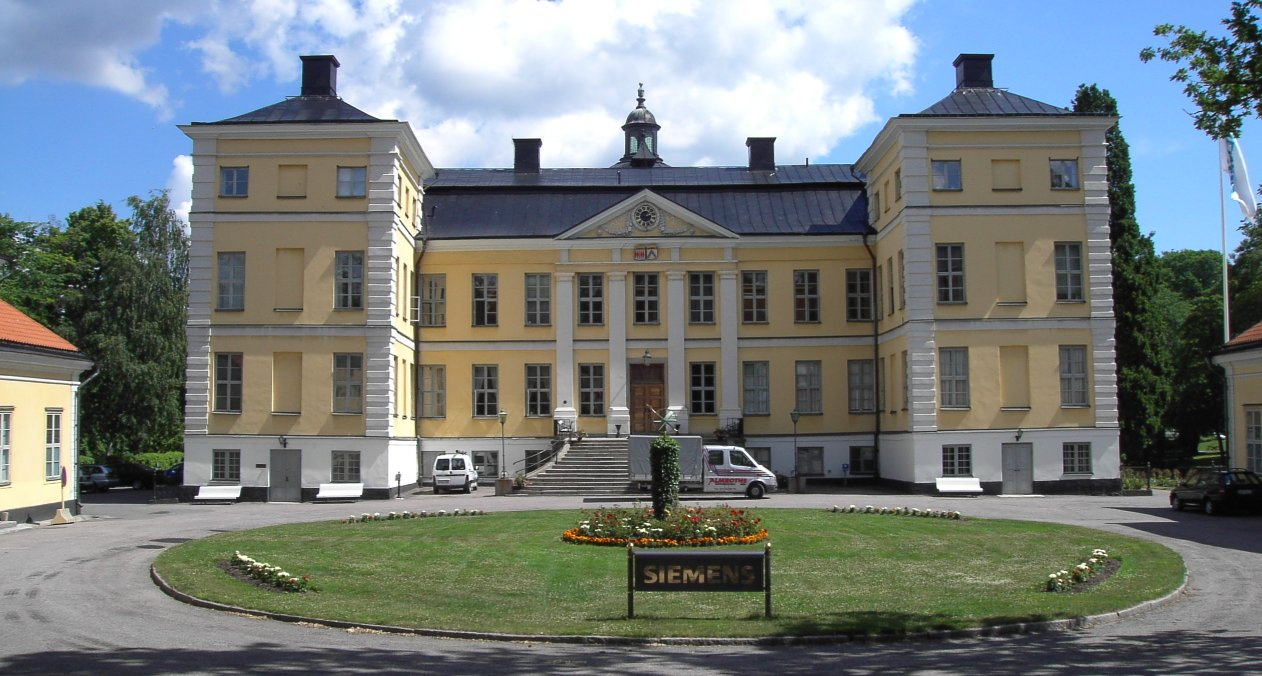
Finspång castle

Finspång Municipality (Swedish: Finspångs kommun) is a municipality in Östergötland County in Sweden. Its seat is located in the town of Finspång, with some 21 654 (30 September 2024), inhabitants.

== Nature ==
The municipality refers to itself as Sweden's most lake-dense municipality, with at least 170 named lakes. The municipality boasts that one can swim in a different lake each day of the year as there are 366 different ones.

== History ==
Finspång is a traditional industrial city. The first industries were established in 1580 when a Royal factory for cannon and cannonballs was supervised. The industry was to continue for 300 years under supervision of the Dutch-stemming family De Geer. By Louis de Geer (1622-1695), the Finspång Castle was constructed, and around it industries and an orangery developed into the city Finspång. Today the two main industrial areas are those of turbines and aluminum processing.

== Localities ==
- Finspång (seat)
- Rejmyre
- Lotorp
- Sonstorp
- Falla
- Hällestad
- Ljusfallshammar
- Grytgöl
- Igelfors
- Borggård
- Butbro
- Hävla
- Bränntorp
- Byle
- Kolstad
- Lämmetorp
- Lövlund
- Prästköp

== Demographics ==
This is a demographic table based on Finspång Municipality's electoral districts in the 2022 Swedish general election sourced from SVT's election platform, in turn taken from SCB official statistics.

In total there were 21,862 residents, including 16,657 Swedish citizens of voting age. 48.5% voted for the left coalition and 50.0% for the right coalition. Indicators are in percentage points except population totals and income.

Location	Residents	Citizen adults	Left vote	Right vote	Employed	Swedish parents	Foreign heritage	Income SEK	Degree
Location			%	%					
Bergska	1,179	903	52.8	45.7	85	83	17	27,080	37
Brenäs	475	402	40.9	58.2	91	92	8	27,194	38
Centrum	1,227	1,041	54.4	43.9	76	78	22	20,411	30
Grosvad	1,784	1,294	53.5	45.7	78	71	29	23,826	30
Grytgöl	549	447	43.3	55.4	87	96	4	26,006	27
Hagaryd	554	463	42.9	54.7	85	92	8	24,055	31
Hårstorp N	1,609	1,160	52.4	46.1	81	72	28	25,759	39
Hårstorp S	1,631	1,110	50.6	47.2	70	64	36	22,861	32
Hällestad	1,006	773	50.2	48.5	84	91	9	24,064	28
Ljusfallshammar	439	367	41.8	56.3	80	92	8	22,564	28
Lotorp	1,152	865	42.0	56.9	88	91	9	29,181	34
Nyhem	1,524	1,022	52.4	45.9	71	65	35	22,546	30
Regna	582	482	37.1	61.1	77	90	10	21,704	21
Rejmyre	1,087	861	43.0	55.5	79	88	12	23,021	23
Sonstorp	889	694	39.0	60.2	88	93	7	26,287	28
Storängen	1,618	1,246	52.7	46.1	74	70	30	22,035	29
Svälthagen	1,420	1,055	48.8	49.6	81	79	21	24,626	31
Viggestorp	1,451	1,141	46.0	52.6	86	88	12	28,585	39
Östermalm	1,686	1,331	52.4	46.6	80	76	24	23,843	33
Source: SVT

== Elections ==
=== Riksdag ===
These are the results of the Riksdag elections of Finspång Municipality since the 1972 municipality reform. The results of the Sweden Democrats were not published by SCB between 1988 and 1998 at a municipal level to the party's small nationwide size at the time. "Votes" denotes valid votes, whereas "Turnout" denotes also blank and invalid votes.

Year	Turnout	Votes	V	S	MP	C	L	KD	M	SD	ND
1973	93.7	15,333	3.9	56.9	0.0	20.6	6.1	2.9	9.3	0.0	0.0
1976	94.2	15,981	3.3	55.8	0.0	19.5	8.1	2.5	10.3	0.0	0.0
1979	93.0	16,078	4.5	56.4	0.0	14.7	8.2	2.6	13.1	0.0	0.0
1982	93.4	16,121	4.3	59.2	1.4	13.2	4.2	2.8	14.9	0.0	0.0
1985	92.2	16,001	4.6	58.2	1.4	12.5	9.6	0.0	13.6	0.0	0.0
1988	88.5	15,190	5.5	56.1	4.9	10.3	8.4	4.1	10.5	0.0	0.0
1991	89.1	15,095	5.1	50.7	2.8	7.5	6.6	8.3	12.3	0.0	6.4
1994	89.3	15,081	7.4	55.1	4.3	6.9	4.9	5.2	14.1	0.0	1.2
1998	84.3	13,830	14.5	46.2	4.0	4.4	2.9	11.4	14.9	0.0	0.0
2002	83.0	13,253	9.4	51.6	4.0	5.7	8.2	9.6	9.6	0.9	0.0
2006	83.7	13,301	6.6	47.1	4.1	7.0	4.7	7.0	18.0	2.7	0.0
2010	85.2	13,760	6.1	43.9	5.8	5.6	4.6	5.8	22.2	5.3	0.0
2014	86.4	13,971	5.3	43.2	4.6	5.1	3.3	4.6	16.1	15.4	0.0

Blocs

This lists the relative strength of the socialist and centre-right blocs since 1973, but parties not elected to the Riksdag are inserted as "other", including the Sweden Democrats results from 1988 to 2006, but also the Christian Democrats pre-1991 and the Greens in 1982, 1985 and 1991. The sources are identical to the table above. The coalition or government mandate marked in bold formed the government after the election. New Democracy got elected in 1991 but are still listed as "other" due to the short lifespan of the party. "Elected" is the total number of percentage points from the municipality that went to parties who were elected to the Riksdag.

Year	Turnout	Votes	Left	Right	SD	Other	Elected
1973	93.7	15,333	**60.8**	36.0	0.0	3.2	96.8
1976	94.2	15,981	59.1	**37.9**	0.0	3.0	97.0
1979	93.0	16,078	60.9	**36.0**	0.0	3.1	96.9
1982	93.4	16,121	**63.5**	32.3	0.0	4.2	95.8
1985	92.2	16,001	**62.8**	35.7	0.0	1.5	98.5
1988	88.5	15,190	**66.5**	29.2	0.0	4.3	95.7
1991	89.1	15,095	55.8	**34.7**	0.0	9.5	96.9
1994	89.3	15,081	**66.8**	31.1	0.0	2.1	97.9
1998	84.3	13,830	**64.7**	33.6	0.0	1.7	98.3
2002	83.0	13,253	**65.0**	33.1	0.0	1.9	98.1
2006	83.7	13,301	57.8	**36.7**	0.0	5.5	94.5
2010	85.2	13,760	55.8	**38.2**	5.3	0.7	99.3
2014	86.4	13,971	**53.1**	29.1	15.4	2.4	97.6

== Twin towns ==
Finspång Municipality has formal twin town treaties with three cities. These treaties were signed in 1967.

- Stromberg, Germany
- Yvoir, Belgium
- Givet, France

Today there is no contact with Stromberg or Givet, and contact was broken with Yvoir before being reestablished in 1997.

Finspång also has (informally) established cooperation with seven other cities:

- Dzierzgoń, Poland
- Finsterwalde, Germany
- Joutsa, Finland
- Nordborg, Denmark
- Salaspils, Latvia
- Sibiu, Romania
- Stade, Germany

(Source and more information: (in Swedish))

== Notable people born in Finspång ==
- Louis Gerhard De Geer (1818–1896) - First Prime Minister of Sweden
- Kerstin Ekman (born 1933) - author
- Pär Arvidsson (born 1960) - butterfly swimmer
- Bengt Baron (born 1962) - backstroke swimmer
- Liselotte Neumann (born 1966) - professional golfer
- Dan Swanö (born 1973) - musician and music producer
- Robert Steiner (born 1973) - professional soccer player

== Sports ==
The following sports clubs are located in Finspång Municipality:

- Sonstorps IK
- Torstorps IF

== See also ==
- Finspång Fief Hundred
