= Falla, Östergötland =

Falla
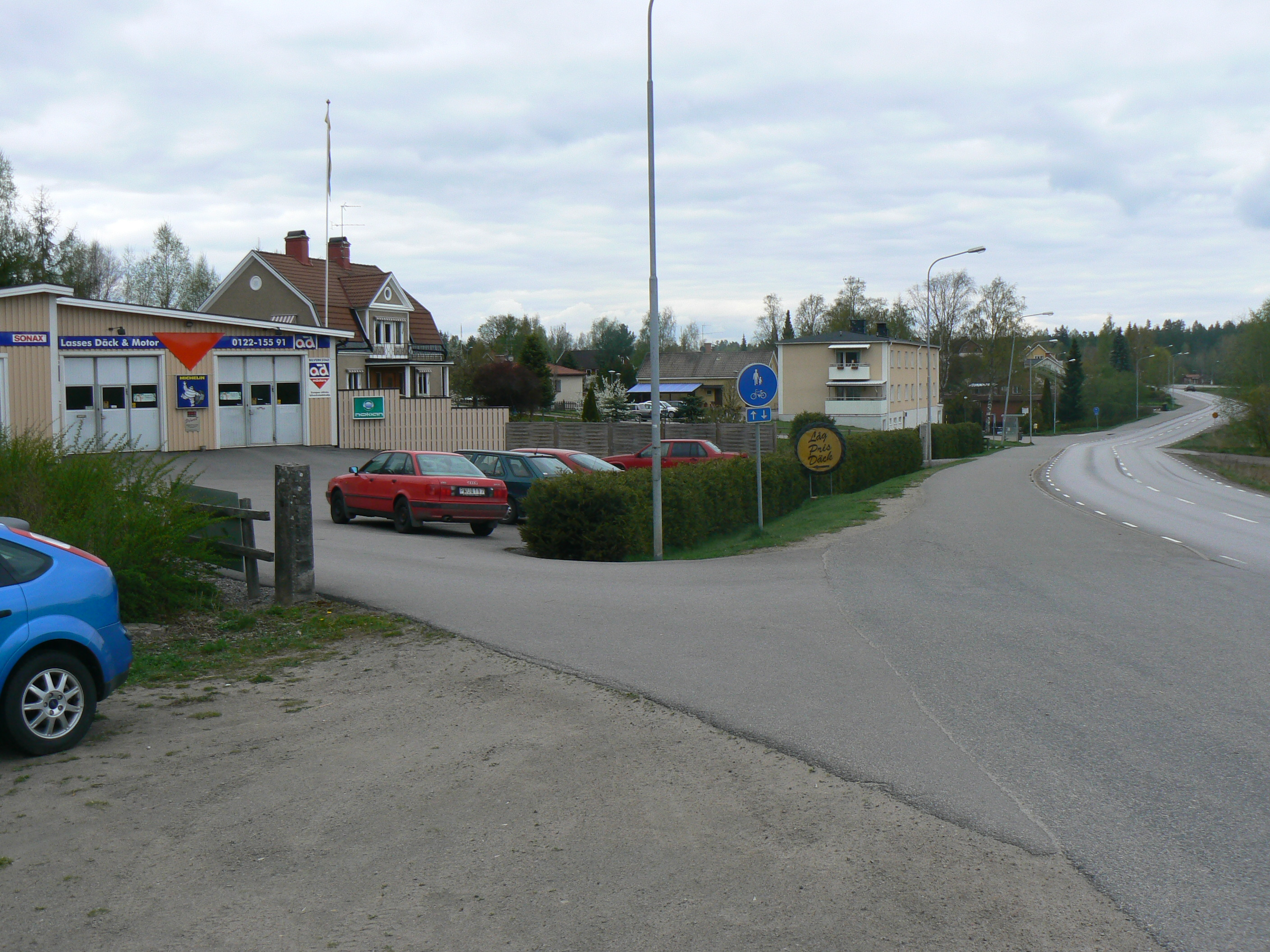

- Location within Östergötland Location within Sweden
- Coordinates: 58°41′N 15°45′E
- Country: Sweden
- Province: Östergötland
- County: Östergötland County
- Municipality: Finspång Municipality

Area
  - Total: 0.71 km^{2} (0.27 sq mi)

Population (31 December 2010)
  - Total: 467
  - Density: 654/km^{2} (1,690/sq mi)
- Time zone: UTC+1 (CET)
  - Summer (DST): UTC+2 (CEST)

Falla is a locality situated in Finspång Municipality, Östergötland County, Sweden with 467 inhabitants in 2010.
