= Takin' It to the Streets =

Takin' It to the Streets may refer to:

- Takin' It to the Streets (The Doobie Brothers album)
  - "Takin' It to the Streets" (song from above album)
- Takin' It to the Streets (FM album)
