= Lotorps IF =

Swedish sports club

- Full name: Lotorps idrottsförening
- Sport: association football bandy, skiing (earlier)
- Founded: 15 March 1923
- Based in: Lotorp, Sweden
- Ballpark: Bruksvallen

Lotorps IF is a sports club in Lotorp, Sweden, established on 15 March 1923. The women's bandy team has played three seasons in the Swedish top division. The women's soccer team played three seasons in the Swedish top division between 1978 and 1997.
