= Igelfors Bruk =

Igelfors Bruk AB is a Swedish manufacturer of different forgings, including transmission details for trucks and drawbars for circuit breakers. They also manufacture customer-ready products, including Rescue Axes that are shipped worldwide. The company is a subsidiary owned by the Permec Group, and is situated in a small village called Igelfors, hence the company name. It was founded in 1891, when two local factories, Igelfors Stångjärnsbruk and Nyhammars spikbruk, were merged.
