= The Entire Population of Hackney =

English supergroup band

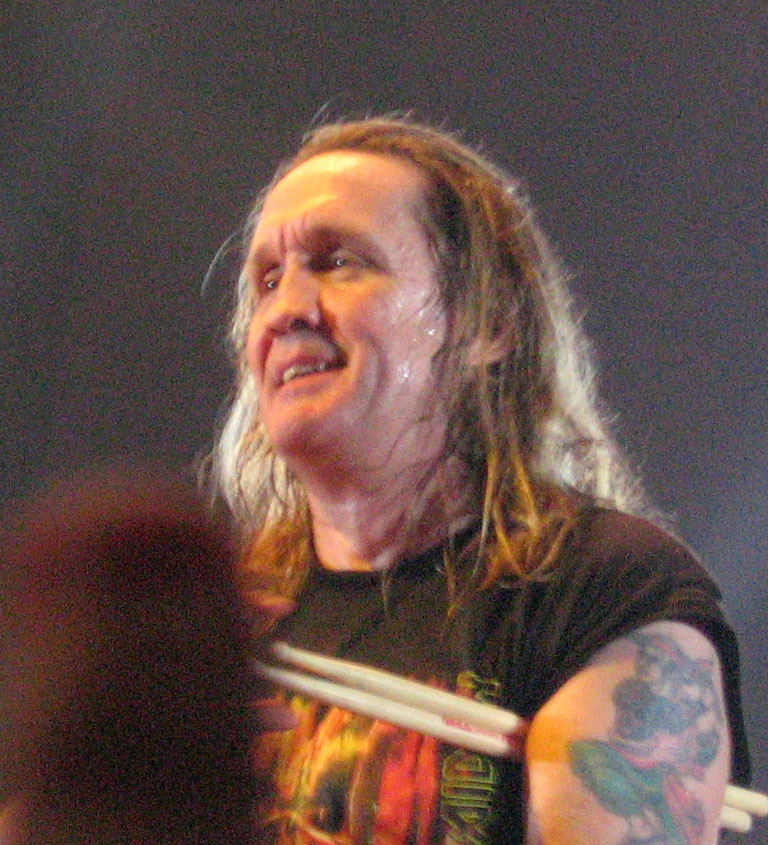
- Nicko McBrain, 2006

Background information
- Also known as: The Sherman Tankers
- Origin: Hackney, London, England
- Genres: Hard rock; heavy metal
- Years active: 1985
- Spinoffs: ASAP; The Untouchables; Psycho Motel; Smith/Kotzen
- Spinoff of: Iron Maiden; Urchin; FM

The Entire Population of Hackney is the name used for a supergroup project featuring members of Iron Maiden, FM and Urchin that played two concerts in December 1985. It is also the name used for a bootleg recording of the first show. It is most notable for being the spark that would lead to Adrian Smith forming his ASAP project later on and ultimately his split with Iron Maiden in 1990 (He returned in 1999 and has since remained a member of the band, although he has pursued other projects). It is also notable for leading to the first Iron Maiden recording without the current lead singer on lead vocals.

== Background ==
At the end of the World Slavery Tour in July 1985, Iron Maiden took six months off, when Nicko McBrain's frustration of not playing after winding down from an extensive Iron Maiden tour and looking at a six-month break, drove him to rent a rehearsal studio and invite Adrian Smith along to jam. The two invited more friends including: Dave Colwell (the one who wrote "Reach Out"), Visage guitarist Andy Barnett as well as Martin Connoly, a friend of McBrain's who also played in Marshall Fury. Colwell and Barnett were both members of an early line-up of the band FM at the time "That Girl" was written in 1984 by Barnett with bassist Merv Goldsworthy and drummer Pete Jupp. It was this early version of the song which was performed by The Entire Population of Hackney and later covered by Iron Maiden, whilst FM re-wrote parts of their song for inclusion on their 1986 debut album, Indiscreet.

McBrain arranged two gigs, one under the name The Entire Population of Hackney and the other under the name The Sherman Tankers. The audience recording called The Entire Population of Hackney was taken from the first show; Bruce Dickinson, Dave Murray and Steve Harris joined the band on stage only for the encores. Their set includes songs from all the members and some covers from Bob Seger and ZZ Top.

The result of this short break from Iron Maiden was that three of the songs featured in the setlist would be later used on two Iron Maiden singles. "Reach Out" featured on "Wasted Years" and "Juanita" and "That Girl" featured on "Stranger in a Strange Land".

== Set list (first show) ==
The Entire Population of Hackney

Live album by Urchin/Iron Maiden/FM
- Released: 1985
- Recorded: Marquee Club, London, England, 19 December 1985.
- Genre: Bootleg recording
- Producer: N/A

Track listing

| No. | Title | Writer(s) | Length |
|---|---|---|---|
| 1. | "Juanita" (Marshall Fury cover) | Steve Barnacle, Derek O'Neil | 4:32 |
| 2. | "See Me Through" (Buster James cover) | BJB, Martin Croxford | 3:22 |
| 3. | "Reach Out" | Dave Colwell | 3:36 |
| 4. | "Chevrolet" (ZZ Top cover) | Billy Gibbons | 3:38 |
| 5. | "My Lady" (Urchin song) | Adrian Smith | 6:55 |
| 6. | "Silver and Gold" | Smith, Andy Barnett, Colwell, Richard Young | 6:21 |
| 7. | "That Girl" (FM song) | Goldsworthy, Jupp, Barnett | 5:06 |
| 8. | "Fighting Man" | Barnett, Colwell | 5:33 |
| 9. | "School Days" | Colwell | 5:51 |
| 10. | "When She's Gone" | Smith | 5:30 |
| 11. | "Try" | Kenny Mountain | 4:06 |
| 12. | "Losfer Words (Big 'Orra)" (Iron Maiden song) (Steve Harris & Dave Murray arrive on stage) | Harris | 4:11 |
| 13. | "2 Minutes to Midnight" (Iron Maiden song) (Bruce Dickinson arrives on stage) | Smith, Dickinson | 6:11 |
| 14. | "Rosalie" (Bob Seger cover) | Seger | 4:33 |
| 15. | "Tush" (ZZ Top cover) | Gibbons, Dusty Hill, Frank Beard | 4:29 |

== Credits (first show) ==
(On the bootleg, included beneath each member is a list of bands that each were in that had songs played at this concert.)

- Adrian Smith – lead vocals (tracks 1–6, 8, 10 and 11), lead & rhythm guitars (all tracks)
  - Urchin, Iron Maiden and ASAP,
- Bruce Dickinson - lead vocals (tracks 13–15)
  - Iron Maiden
- Andy Barnett – lead vocals (tracks 7 and 9), lead & rhythm guitars, backing vocals (tracks 1–6, 8, 10 and 11)
  - Urchin, Marshall Fury, FM and ASAP
- Dave Colwell – lead & rhythm guitars, backing vocals (tracks 1–11)
  - 720, FM and ASAP.
- Dave Murray - lead & rhythm guitars (tracks 12–15)
  - Urchin and Iron Maiden
- Martin Connoly – bass (tracks 1–11)
  - Marshall Fury
- Steve Harris - bass (tracks 12–15)
  - Iron Maiden
- Nicko McBrain - drums (all tracks)
  - Iron Maiden
