= Qvarforth =

Family name

Origin
- Origin: German
- Region of origin: Scandinavia, Belgium, Germany

Qvarforth is a surname whose origins may have begun in Germany. Qvarforth, or one of its derivatives, is a surname used in Scandinavia, Germany, Belgium and other areas located in northern Europe.

Its origin can be traced back to Anders Qvarfordt born in Querfod, Saxony (Germany). This may have later developed into the surname of two melters, Mikkel and Anders Querfood, who worked at Baerums factory in Norway in 1610.

The name Qvarfordt is first mentioned in 1627 from an area then known as Risinge until 1942, since 1971 Finspång Municipality, Östergötland County, Sweden, with Anders Qvarfordt. He and his nine children are mentioned in a court order in Risinge 1695. Five of his six sons were blacksmiths and two of his three daughters were married to blacksmiths.

The theory is that the family is German and not from Wallonia. There is a town in Saxony called Querfurt and it is believed that descendants of Querfurt as they moved throughout got the name "Franz of Querfurt", which over time turned into varieties of Querfurt in the different regions. There are 16 different varieties of Qvarfordt. The form Qvarfordt makes up about half of all instances of the broader name.

Qvarforth comes in many varieties:

- Cvarfordh
- Kvarfordh
- Kvarfordt
- Kavarforth
- Quarford
- Quarfot
- Quarfordt
- Qvarfordt
- Qvarfors
- Qvarfort
- Qvarforth
- Qvarfot
- Qvarfoth
- Qvarfott
- Qwarfordt
- Qwarfort
