= Tobruk (band) =

English rock band

- Origin: Bedfordshire, England
- Genres: Rock, hard rock
- Years active: 1981–1987
- Labels: Parlophone; FM Revolver
- Past members: Stuart "Snake" Neale; Nigel Evans; Mick Newman; Eddie Fincher; Mike Brown; Jem Davies

Tobruk were an English rock band, formed in 1981.

== History ==
The band was formed in 1981 when vocalist Stuart "Snake" Neale (26 April 1963 – 20 December 2006), guitarist Nigel Evans, and keyboard player Jem Davies from the Bedford-based band, Stranger, joined forces with guitarist Mick Newman, bassist Steve Woodward and drummer Allan Vallance.

Although the band came to the fore during the tail-end of the new wave of British heavy metal movement, their sound was more melodic and polished.

The band relocated to Birmingham and commenced touring. A demo brought them exposure on the Friday Rock Show in 1982. They gigged to promote their debut single "Wild on the Run" with "The Show Must Go On" which was released on Neat Records around 1983. Steve Woodward, who was a founding member and main songwriter, left the band in 1983 after a tour with Diamond Head just as EMI was showing interest in the band. A new rhythm section was recruited, when drummer Eddie Fincher and bassist Mike Brown joined. Vallance went on to stints in Sons of Eden and Proteus. Woodward currently plays guitar and sings in the band Three Chord Trick.

The band's management at the time, Light And Sound Design, hired out the Birmingham Odeon, rigged it with expensive lights and sound and invited various talent scouts. This led the band to sign a deal. After signing to EMI (Parlophone) in 1984 Tobruk went on a club tour before playing some dates with Diamond Head. They also toured the UK supporting UFO.

They then ventured to Philadelphia to start recording their debut album, also titled Wild on the Run at Warehouse Studios. Lance Quinn from Lita Ford and Bon Jovi-fame co-produced the album with the band. The album was released in May 1985 and tours followed supporting UFO, Tokyo Blade and Manowar.

The band's 1985 single "Falling" gained some airplay. The 7" single release contained a prize draw competition in which the prize was a parachute jump (i.e. free-'falling') with the band at Bovingdon Green Airfield in Buckinghamshire. The winner (23-year-old John Michael Dunn (later known as John Michael Richards), of Thatto Heath, St.Helens, Merseyside (Lancashire)) had to sign a disclaimer/waiver relinquishing Parlophone Records of any responsibility for death, injury or loss. John Richards was a prominent Rock DJ on radio in Northwest England.

Unfortunately, the band could not break in the UK, as they sounded too American. The album's sales disappointed and the band left Parlophone around 1987. A second album was released through FM Revolver, called Pleasure + Pain.

By this stage, the band started falling apart with Snake and Fincher leaving the band to join the band Idol Rich. Tobruk tried to soldier on and recorded some demos with ex-The Alliance vocalist, Tony Martin, but nothing came of it and the band split for good. Martin went on to join Black Sabbath. Nigel spent some time touring with Shy.

Snake also had a stint in an early incarnation of The Wildhearts, but never recorded officially with them, although some demos were produced. Mike Brown played bass in a short-lived band with Alan Kelly (drummer, ex-Shy) called Why The Rabbit shortly after Tobruk broke up. Jem Davis and Fincher started the band Midnight Blue with one-time Yngwie Malmsteen and Rainbow singer Doogie White and recorded Take The Money and Run circa 1994. Davis also toured with UFO and had stints in Praying Mantis and FM.

Phoenix Music re-issued a Tobruk retrospective in 2001 with rare tracks and video footage, called Recaptured. Rip Tide Records also re-released Wild on the Run on CD in that year.

== Discography ==
- The Girl with the Flyaway Hair (WEA – Ireland), 1981
- "Wild on the Run" 7" (Neat), 1983
- Wild on the Run (Parlophone / EMI), 1985
  - Wild on the Run [Re-released with Bonus Live Disc] (Majestic Rock Records), 2007
- Pleasure + Pain (FM Revolver), 1987
- Recaptured (Phoenix), 2001

== See also ==
- List of new wave of British heavy metal bands
- The Wildhearts
