= Steve Overland =

British singer/musician (born 1960)

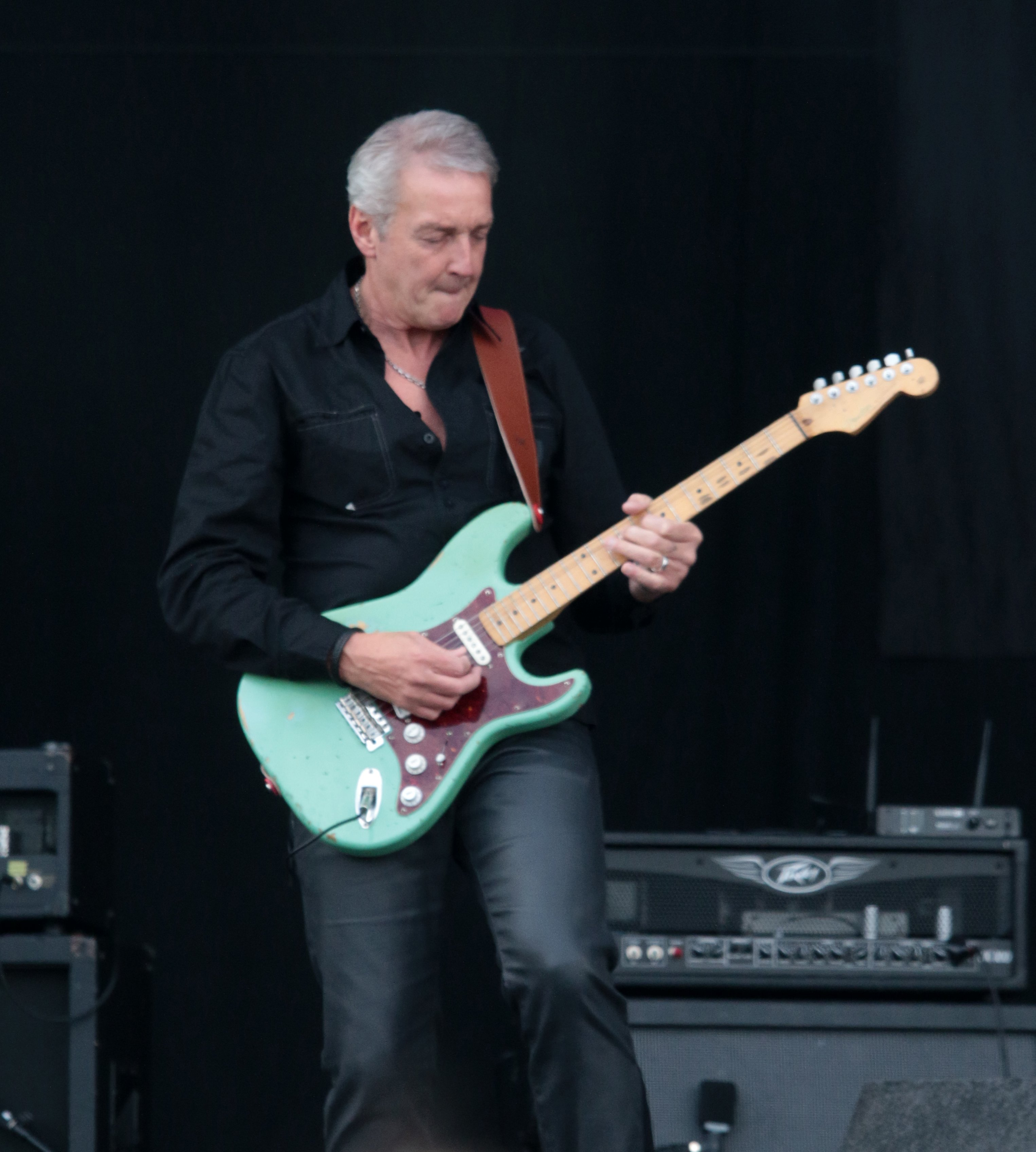
- Overland with FM in 2015

Background information
- Born: 16 July 1960 (age 66); King's Lynn, Norfolk, England
- Instruments: Guitar, Vocals
- Member of: FM
- Formerly of: Wildlife; The Ladder; Shadowman

Steve Overland is a British singer and guitarist who is the lead vocalist and songwriter for the bands Wildlife, FM, The Ladder, Shadowman, and his own group, Overland. Most recently he has collaborated with Fates Warning guitarist, Jim Matheos, in Kings of Mercia.

== History ==
Overland's nearly 50-year career began in his home region of East Anglia, where he and his brother Chris formed the band Wildlife in 1980. The group were scouted by Adam Faith and soon signed to Chrysalis Records, who released the band's debut album, Burning, in 1980. The band moved labels to the Led Zeppelin owned Swan Song Records for their 1983 self-titled follow up album, which featured Simon Kirke on drums. The band were also managed for a short period by Peter Grant. The demise of Swan Song in 1983 meant that the Wildlife album was under-promoted, with an American release for the album being cancelled. Around this time, the band also recorded a song called "Shot in the Dark" that was never featured on an album. However, this tune later served as the prototype for Ozzy Osbourne's song of the same name. Wildlife's version was never officially released, and the band split up soon after.

Overland next formed the AOR band FM, with former Wildlife members Pete Jupp and Chris Overland. FM's first album, issued in 1986 on Portrait Records, was named Indiscreet. The band's next album, Tough It Out, was released in 1989 with serious financial backing from Epic Records, which was Portrait's parent company. For this album, the band brought in songwriter Desmond Child, known for his work on Bon Jovi's album, Slippery When Wet. This 1986 to 1989 period saw the band at their commercial peak, scoring minor UK Chart hits with "Frozen Heart", "Bad Luck", and the non-album release, "Let Love Be The Leader". The band toured as headline artists, as well as undertaking support slots with Bon Jovi, Tina Turner and Meat Loaf.

The band was then dropped by Epic Records and signed to Music for Nations for their third album, Takin' It to the Streets. The album displayed a shift towards a more straightforward rock approach and also included a cover of "I Heard It Through the Grapevine", which was released as a single. This was the first album to feature ex-Visage and ASAP guitarist Andy Barnett, Chris Overland having left the band after the Tough It Out tour. FM's fourth album, Aphrodisiac, followed in 1992 and is often considered to be the band's best. The band then signed to the Raw Power label to record Dead Man's Shoes, which featured new keyboard player, Jem Davis. In March 1996, Steve Overland and Pete Jupp decided to disband FM, forming the band So! with Wishbone Ash bass player, Bob Skeat, soon after. So!'s debut album, Brass Monkey, had two very limited releases, with copies of either release being difficult to come by.

Overland has recorded prolifically throughout the 2000s (decade), with the bands The Ladder, Shadowman, and latterly, with his solo albums, Break Away and Diamond Dealer.

In 2007, FM reformed for a one-off gig at Nottingham's Rock City, headlining Firefest IV. This 'one-off' reunion led to a more permanent incarnation with Jim Kirkpatrick replacing Andy Barnett on lead guitar. Overland and Kirkpatrick had been a songwriting team independently of the band prior to Jim joining FM. FM have since toured extensively in the UK and throughout Europe, both as headliners and also touring with Thin Lizzy, Journey, Foreigner and Europe. Five more albums have been released Metropolis (2010), Rockville (2013), Rockville II (2013), Heroes and Villains (2015) and Atomic Generation (2018).

Overland has also appeared in the Broadway show Dreamtime, which had a successful run at the Ed Sullivan Theater.

In November 2023 it was announced that Overland (the band) would perform at Firefest Festival (10 Years After) to be held in the UK at Manchester Academy on 11-13 October 2024. The band preceded headline act Hurricane on the Saturday night.

== Discography ==
=== with Wildlife ===
- Burning (1980)
- Wildlife (1983)

=== with FM ===
- Indiscreet (1986)
- Tough It Out (1989)
- Takin' It to the Streets (1991)
- Aphrodisiac (1992)
- Dead Man's Shoes (1995)
- Metropolis (2010)
- Rockville (2013)
- Rockville II (2013)
- Heroes and Villains (2015)
- Indiscreet 30 (2016)
- Atomic Generation (2018)
- Synchronized (2020)
- Thirteen (2022)
- Old Habits Die Hard (2024)
- Brotherhood (2025)

=== with So! ===
- Brass Monkey (2000)

=== with The Ladder ===
- Future Miracles (2004)
- Sacred (2007)

=== with Shadowman ===
- Land of the Living (2004)
- Different Angles (2006)
- Ghost in the Mirror (2008)
- Watching Over You (2011)
- Secrets and Lies (2017)

=== with Overland ===
- Break Away (2008)
- Diamond Dealer (2009)
- Epic (2014)
- Contagious (2016)
- Scandalous (2020)
- Six (2023)

=== with Ozone ===
- Self Defence (2015)

=== with Groundbreaker ===
- Groundbreaker (2018)
- Soul to Soul (2021)

=== with Lonerider ===
- Attitude (2019)
- Sundown (2022)
- Down In The Dust (2024)

=== with Kings of Mercia ===
- Kings of Mercia (2022)
- Battle Scars (2024)

=== with The Staks Band ===
- Hurricane (2020)
- Journeyman (Back On The Open Road) (2023)

=== with Acoustica ===
- Acoustica (2026)

=== Guest appearances ===
Title	Release	Other artist(s)	Album
"Fall Free"	1996	Alan Parsons	On Air
"Revealing Science of God"	2001		Wonderous (A Tribute to Yes)
"Owner of a Lonely Heart"	2001		Wonderous (A Tribute to Yes)
"Always Yours"	2017	Lee Abraham	Colours
