= Hällestad =

- Location within Östergötland Location within Sweden
- Coordinates: 58°44′N 15°34′E
- Country: Sweden
- Province: Östergötland
- County: Östergötland County
- Municipality: Finspång Municipality

Area
  - Total: 0.99 km^{2} (0.38 sq mi)

Population (31 December 2020)
  - Total: 322
  - Density: 330/km^{2} (840/sq mi)
- Time zone: UTC+1 (CET)
  - Summer (DST): UTC+2 (CEST)

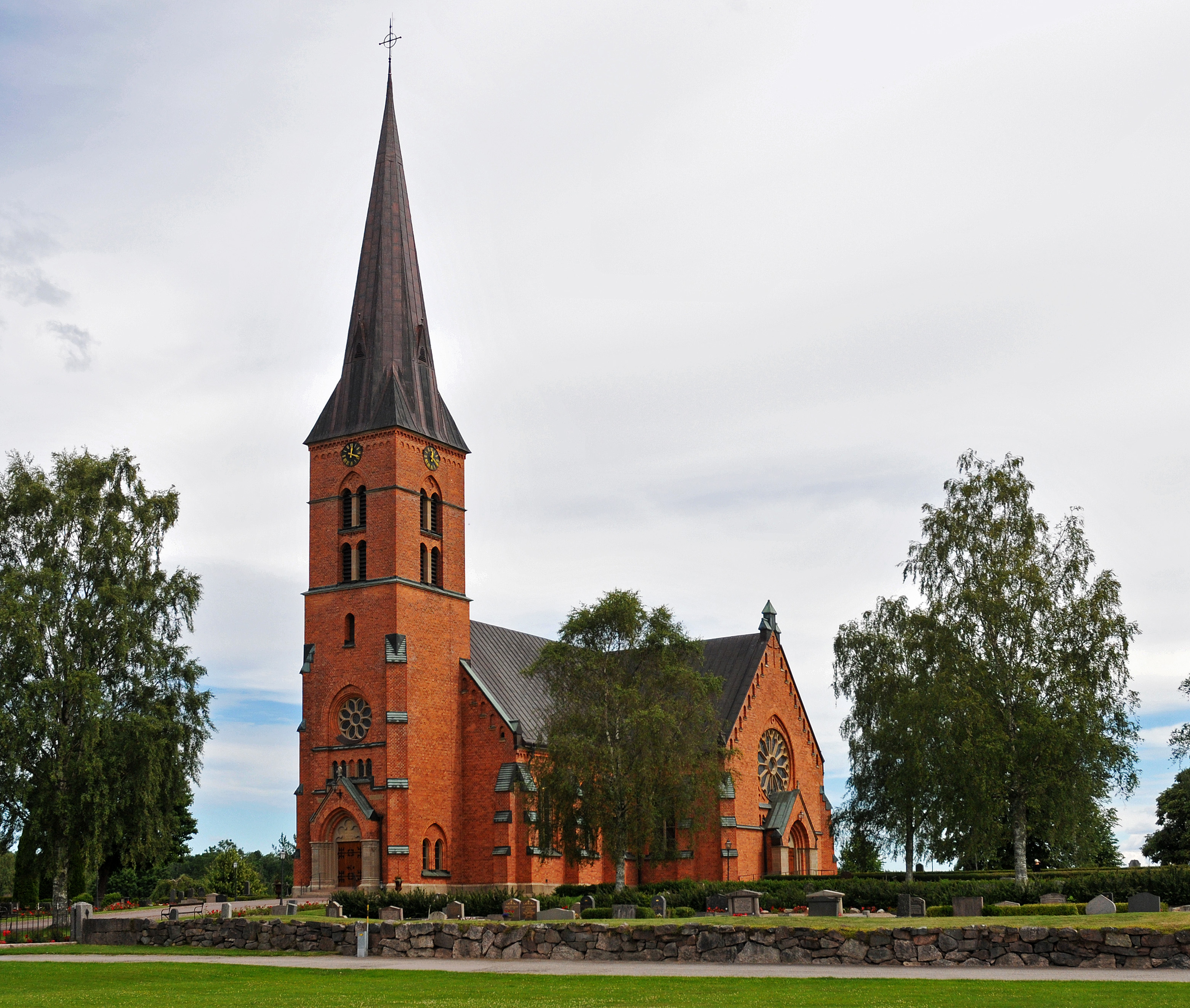

Hällestad is a locality situated in Finspång Municipality, Östergötland County, Sweden with 336 inhabitants in 2010.
