= Future Miracles =

Album by The Ladder

Studio album by The Ladder
- Released: 2004
- Genre: Hard rock
- Length: 52:24 (46:03)
- Labels: Avalon; MICP-10470
- Producer: Steve Morris

Future Miracles is the debut album by the British group The Ladder. All of the songs on the album were former FM songs that were never recorded by that band.

== Track listing ==
1. "Like Lovers Do" – 4:38 (Steve Overland/Chris Overland)
2. "Closer to Your Heart" – 4:58 (S. Overland/C. Overland/Merv Goldsworthy/Pete Jupp)
3. "Do You Love Me Enough" – 4:35 (S. Overland/Jupp)
4. "Dangerous" – 6:05 (S. Overland/C. Overland)
5. "Baby Blue" – 4:17 (S. Overland/Goldsworthy/Jupp)
6. "All I Ever Really Wanted" – 4:07 (S. Overland/Jupp)
7. "Time For Changes" – 4:16 (S. Overland/Jupp)
8. "The Angels Cried" – 6:21 (S. Overland/Jupp)
9. "Say It Like It Is" – 4:20 (S. Overland/C. Overland)
10. "When Tomorrow Comes" – 4:40 (S. Overland/C. Overland)
11. "Too Bad" – 4:07 (S. Overland/C. Overland/Jupp)
- Track listing for the Asian version, the European version (Escape Music ESM109) omits track 8.

== Personnel ==
- Steve Overland – lead and backing vocals
- Pete Jupp – drums and percussion
- Bob Skeat – bass guitar
- Vinny Burns – guitars
- Steve Morris – guitars and keyboards

== Production ==
- Executive Producer – Khalil Turk
- Mixing – Corey Macfadyen
- Engineer – Steve Morris
