= Takin' It to the Streets (FM album) =

Studio album by FM
- Released: 1991
- Recorded: Ezee Studios (London); The Old Chapel (Winchester)
- Genre: Hard rock
- Length: 49:04
- Label: Music for Nations
- Producer: FM

FM chronology
Tough It Out (1989)	Takin' It to the Streets (1991)	Aphrodisiac (1992)

Professional ratings
Review scores
Source	Rating
Metal Hammer	4/5 stars

Takin' It to the Streets is the third studio album released by British hard rock band FM. Takin' It to the Streets was released in 1991 on the Music for Nations record label.

== Track listing ==
1. "I'm Ready" - 3:57 (S. Overland)
2. "I Heard It Through the Grapevine" - 4:27 (Norman Whitfield/Barrett Strong)
3. "Only the Strong Survive" - 5:25 (M. Goldsworthy/P. Jupp/S. Overland/A. Barnett)
4. "Just Can't Leave Her Alone" - 4:03 (M. Goldsworthy)
5. "She's No Angel" - 4:43 (M. Goldsworthy/P. Jupp/S. Overland/D. Digital)
6. "Dangerous Ground" - 4:33 (M. Goldsworthy/P. Jupp)
7. "Bad Blood" - 3:52 (M. Goldsworthy/P. Jupp/S. Overland)
8. "Crack Alley" - 4:53 (M. Goldsworthy)
9. "If It Feels Good (Do It)" - 4:30 (M. Goldsworthy/P. Jupp/S. Overland)
10. "The Girl's Gone Bad" - 4:39 (M. Goldsworthy/P. Jupp/S. Overland/A. Barnett)
11. "The Thrill of It All" - 4:02 (M. Goldsworthy)

== Personnel ==
- Steve Overland - Lead vocals, guitar, acoustic guitar
- Merv Goldsworthy - Bass, vocals
- Pete Jupp - Drums, vocals
- Didge Digital - Keyboards
- Andy Barnett - Lead guitar, slide guitar, vocals
- Steve Overland, Andy Barnett, Pete Jupp, Leigh Matty, Craig Joiner and Sonia Jones - Background vocals
- Andy Barnett, Steve Overland and Craig Joiner - Guitar Solos
- Martin Shaw, Dennis Rollins, 'Baps' McMillan and Kenny Wellington - The 'Raging' Horns
- Augustus Gowalski - Horn Arrangement

== Production ==
Produced by Merv Goldsworthy, Steve Overland, Pete Jupp, Andy Barnett and Didge Digital
Engineered by Reg Hollywood and Andy Reilly
Recorded at Ezee Studios (London) and The Old Chapel (Winchester)
Mastered at The Hit Factory (London) by Tim Young
