= Rejmyre =

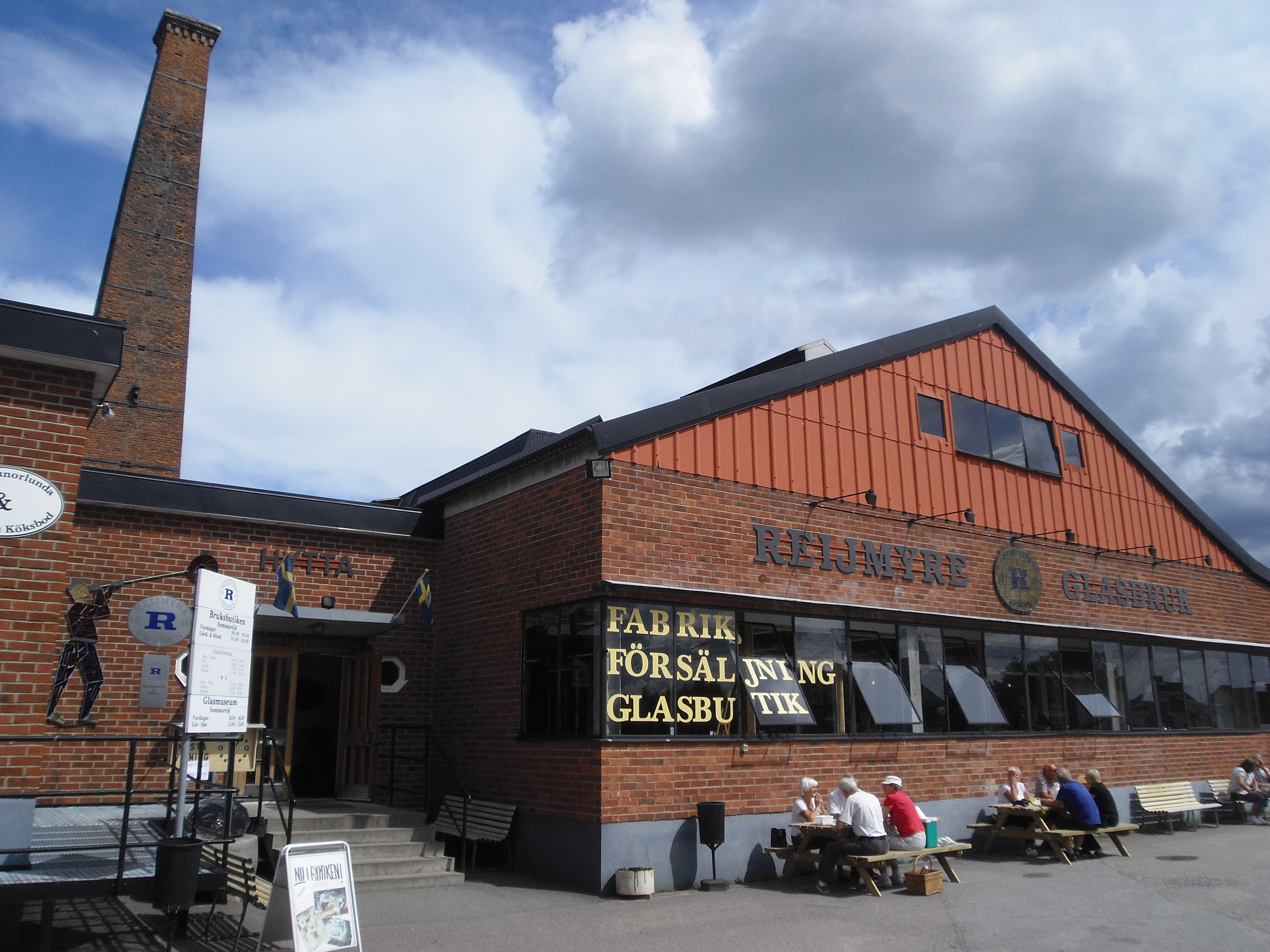

- Location within Östergötland Location within Sweden
- Coordinates: 58°50′N 15°55′E
- Country: Sweden
- Province: Östergötland
- County: Östergötland County
- Municipality: Finspång Municipality

Area
  - Total: 1.15 km^{2} (0.44 sq mi)

Population (31 December 2020)
  - Total: 894
  - Density: 777/km^{2} (2,010/sq mi)
- Time zone: UTC+1 (CET)
  - Summer (DST): UTC+2 (CEST)

Rejmyre is a locality situated in Finspång Municipality, Östergötland County, Sweden with 900 inhabitants in 2010. Rejmyre is best known for Reijmyre Glasbruk, a glass manufacturer founded in 1810.
