= Sonstorps IK =

Swedish football club

- Full name: Sonstorps Idrottsklubb
- Nickname: BLUE AND WHITE
- Short name: SIK
- Founded: 1921
- Ground: Stråkvads IP; Finspång; Sweden
- Chairman: Bo Sundkvist
- Coach: Pontus Gunnarsson
- League: Division 5 Östergötland Östra
Home colours	Away colours

Sonstorps IK is a Swedish football club located in Finspång.

== Background ==
Sonstorps IK currently plays in Division 5 Östergötland Östra which is the sixth tier of Swedish football. They play their home matches at the Stråkvads IP in Finspång.

The club is affiliated to Östergötlands Fotbollförbund.

== Season to season ==
Season	Level	Division	Section	Position	Movements
200^*	Tier 7	Division 5	Östergötland Mellersta	5th	
2007	Tier 7	Division 5	Östergötland Mellersta	6th	
2008	Tier 7	Division 5	Östergötland Östra	1st	Promoted
2009	Tier 6	Division 4	Östergötland Östra	9th	
2010	Tier 6	Division 4	Östergötland Östra	9th	
2011	Tier 6	Division 4	Östergötland Östra		Relegated

* League restructuring in 2006 resulted in a new division being created at Tier 3 and subsequent divisions dropping a level.
