= FM (British band) =

British rock band

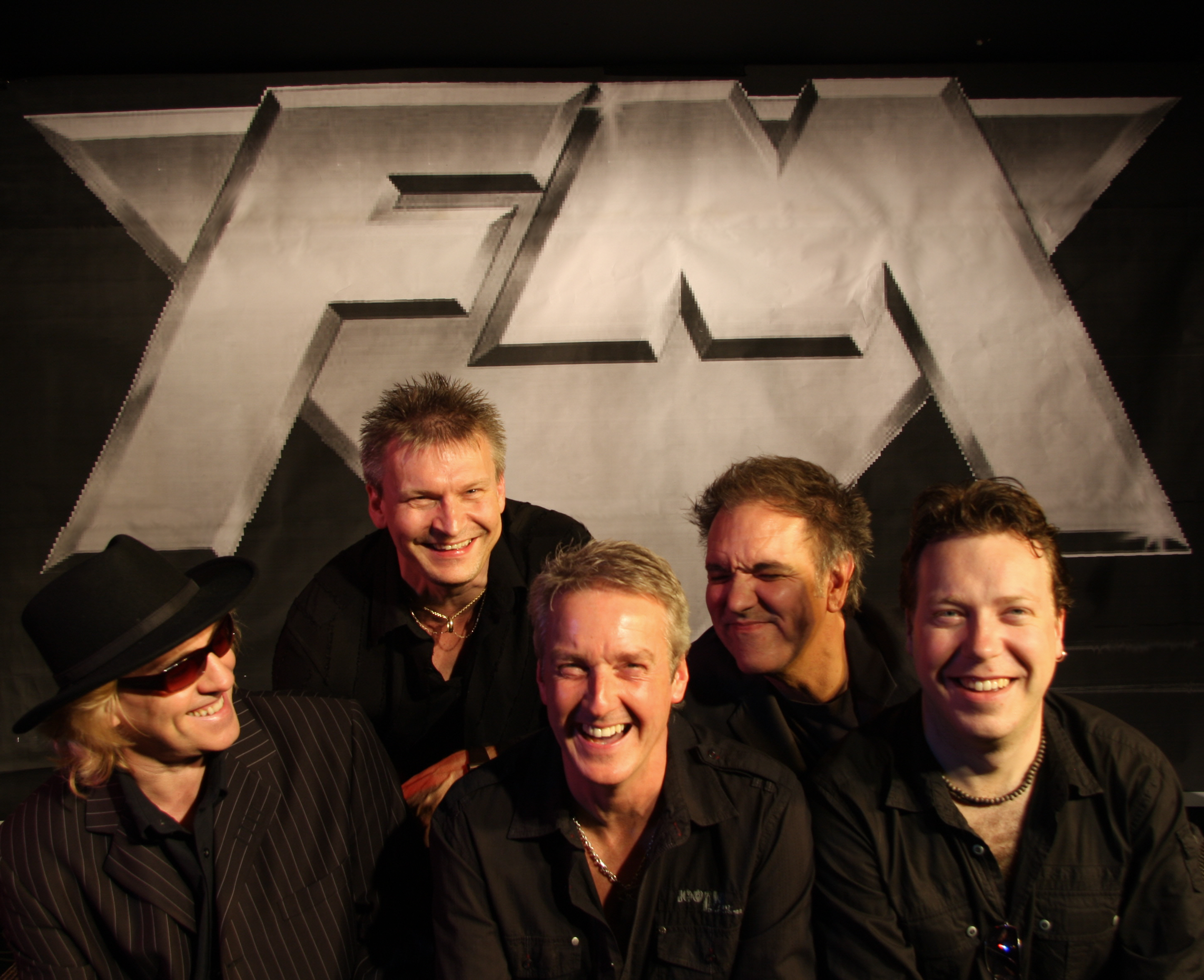
- UK band FM at the video shoot for Wildside - Crewe, 26 July 2009. From left to right: Merv Goldsworthy, Jem Davis, Steve Overland, Pete Jupp, Jim Kirkpatrick

Background information
- Also known as: FM UK (North America)
- Origin: London, England
- Genres: Hard rock
- Years active: 1984–1995, 2007–present
- Labels: Portrait, Epic, Music For Nations, Riff City Records, Frontiers Records
- Members: Merv Goldsworthy; Pete Jupp; Steve Overland; Jem Davis; Jim Kirkpatrick
- Past members: Didge Digital; Chris Overland; Andy Barnett; Tony Mitman
- Website: www.fmofficial.com

FM are a British rock band (referred to as FM UK in North America to avoid confusion with the Canadian progressive rock band FM). They have released fourteen studio albums to date. Three of those, Indiscreet, Tough It Out and 2015's Heroes and Villains reached the UK Albums Chart, whilst five of the band's singles made inroads into the UK Singles Chart.

== Career ==
FM was formed in the summer of 1984 in London. Comprising the ex-Samson pair of bassist Merv Goldsworthy and drummer Pete Jupp, the Overland brothers – vocalist/guitarist Steve and lead guitarist Chris Overland (both formerly of Wildlife, where they played with future Ozzy Osbourne, Johnny Hallyday and Vince Neil bassist Phil Soussan) and keyboardist Philip Manchester (of new wave band The Invaders, also known as Didge Digital), the band initially wrote six songs which by December 1984 had helped them secure a recording contract with the CBS/Portrait label. That same month the band set off on tour in Germany with Meat Loaf.

The first UK public appearance of FM (not to be confused with the Canadian band of the same name) was on Valentine’s Day in 1985 at London's legendary Marquee Club. The debut album, Indiscreet followed and their debut single "Frozen Heart" was heard in many venues during 1986. FM hit the road in Europe supporting Tina Turner, Foreigner, Gary Moore, Status Quo and Magnum, also opening for REO Speedwagon at London’s Hammersmith Odeon. At the year's end they accepted a spot with Bon Jovi on the UK leg of their Slippery When Wet Tour. The band also recorded theme songs for the animated sci-fi series The Adventures of the Galaxy Rangers.

When CBS folded the Portrait label, FM switched to Epic. The Overland brothers went to the United States to write with Desmond Child, returning with the hard rock anthem "Bad Luck". Queensrÿche and Dokken producer Neil Kernon was engaged to oversee 1989’s Tough It Out.

To promote Tough It Out, the band set out on a 42 date UK tour that saw them returning to the Hammersmith Odeon. Soon afterwards, Chris Overland decided to leave FM, his final performance taking place at the Town & Country Club. In his place, FM recruited Andy Barnett, a guitarist who had already been in a prototype line-up of the group, and had a co-writing credit for the Indiscreet song, "That Girl," which was later covered by Iron Maiden as a B-side. His debut with the group was 1991's Takin’ It To The Streets.

FM moved to another record label, Music For Nations, and Didge Digital left in late 1991. A cover version of Marvin Gaye's "I Heard It Through the Grapevine" was not a hit, but was followed by their next album, Aphrodisiac. They undertook a string of acoustic concerts in the winter of 1992.

With Europe and the Far East markets opening up for FM, a full-time keyboard appointment was made with Jem Davis (former Tobruk and UFO), joining the band. The arrangement was short-lived. After the release of Dead Man's Shoes in 1995, the band split up.

At Nottingham's Rock City venue on 27 October 2007 however, FM played together again in public for the first time in twelve years, headlining the sold-out Firefest festival. The reaction the band received to this one-off appearance led to the swift decision to make the reunion permanent. Guitarist Andy Barnett could not commit to long-term plans however and the band were disappointed to accept his resignation. At Steve Overland's suggestion Jim Kirkpatrick was recruited and he made his live debut with FM at a low-key show at Winstanley College (Wigan, UK) on 19 March 2009, followed by a more public appearance when FM headlined Firefest for a second time in October 2009. To coincide with this festival appearance FM released the new single "Wildside" as part of an EP containing new recordings and live tracks. For the first time new recruit Jim Kirkpatrick was featured on record. The single was a taster of forthcoming new album, Metropolis.

Metropolis, FM's first new album since Dead Man's Shoes in 1995, was showcased at a sell-out launch party at The Roadhouse, Covent Garden, London in February 2010 and was released on 31 May 2010. Produced by the band, Metropolis met with critical acclaim and the two singles from the album - "Hollow" (released 17 May 2010) and "Bring Back Yesterday" (released 7 September 2010) each spent a month on the playlist at BBC Radio 2 and were playlisted on many other radio stations.

FM toured all over the UK in support of the album throughout 2010. Their live schedule included a set on the main stage at Download Festival as a late replacement for Ratt in June 2010 and a set on the main stage at Hard Rock Hell IV at Prestatyn in December. December also saw the return of an FM tradition with a 'Christmas Party' show at Islington Academy London.

FM started 2011 with a show at London's Hammersmith Apollo on 22 January with Thin Lizzy. The rest of the year saw the band return to many overseas strongholds of years gone by including headline shows in the Netherlands and Spain (their first ever live concert in that country); a show with D-A-D in Portugal; dates with Journey and Foreigner in Germany, Dublin and Belfast and appearances at major festivals such as Graspop in Belgium and Sweden Rock. They were also invited back to play at Download Festival again.

In January 2012 FM headlined the Sunday night Rock Stage at the Great British Rock & Blues Festival in Skegness and during March they staged three special concerts in Glasgow, Manchester and London to celebrate the 25th Anniversary of the release of their début album Indiscreet. These shows saw FM play Indiscreet live in its entirety for the first time ever as part of a full show and were commemorated by the release of the live in concert DVD Indiscreet 25 Live on 1 April 2013, filmed at the Manchester and London shows. In mid-August 2012 FM performed as Special Guests of Thin Lizzy at shows in Carlisle and Belsonic 2012 in Belfast and followed this with the Special Guest slot on Thin Lizzy's UK tour in November/December 2012 alongside The Treatment. The nine-track mini-album Only Foolin' EP was released 26 November 2012 featuring a mix of new studio recordings and live tracks recorded at FM's "Indiscreet 25Live" shows earlier in the year.

In November 2012 FM announced their forthcoming seventh studio album would be released March 2013 with the title Rockville by launching a PledgeMusic campaign. Via PledgeMusic fans could pre-order the album along with pledging for other items such as a two-CD package to include Rockville II (a second CD of nine new tracks and a new recording of the song "High", originally released by Steve Overland and Pete Jupp under the SO! banner on the album Brass Monkey), Steve Overland's microphone, various items autographed by the band and VIP concert access.

FM held a press launch for Rockville at London O2 Academy 2 Islington on 6 March 2013 which was also attended by Pledgers via the band's PledgeMusic campaign. Following a playback of the album in full the band played a half-hour set of some of their crowd-pleasing anthems before a playback of Rockville II.

Rockville was released 11 March 2013 and debuted on the Official UK Rock Chart at No. 6, followed on 25 March by the release of Rockville II which had earned an official release of its own due to the amount of interest generated by its inclusion in FM's PledgeMusic campaign. On 15 March 2013 FM began a UK tour in support of Rockville. Special Guests for the first four dates on the tour were Vega and Serpentine whilst It Bites and Vega were Special Guests for the second half of the tour. The tour was followed on 6 April 2013 by a set at the inaugural HRH AOR festival which was held at Rotherham's Magna Science Adventure Centre on a bill which included Tesla, Danny Vaughn and past touring-mates Romeo's Daughter.

In June 2013 FM played at HiRock, a two-day festival held in Germany at Freilichtbühne Loreley and the Max Aicher Arena in Inzell. Other artists performing at HiRock included Toto, Rick Springfield, Whitesnake, Journey and Black Star Riders. Due to adverse weather conditions and extensive flooding in the surrounding area the second day of the festival at Inzell did not take place. On 27 July 2013 the band were Special Guests at Planet Rock's Steelhouse Festival in Wales followed the next day by a headline show at The River Rooms in Stourbridge with Toby Jepson performing an acoustic set as Special Guest. During June and July 2013 the band's single "Story Of My Life" from Rockville spent several weeks on the BBC Radio 2 playlist. In December Toby Jepson returned as Special Guest for FM's final headline appearance of the year at a sold-out The Box in Crewe and the band ended the year with a set on the main stage at Planet Rock's Planet Rockstock festival. Their single "Better Late Than Never" was added to the BBC Radio 2 playlist on 26 December 2013.

On the afternoon of Saturday 8 February 2014 FM headlined the 'Reds' stage at the Giants Of Rock festival in Minehead, also appearing were Elliott Randall, Molly Hatchet and Big Country. A large part of the original Friday line-up for this festival was cancelled, resulting in stage times throughout the rest of the weekend being rescheduled.

During 2014 - in addition to writing and recording for their next release - FM toured across the UK with Foreigner and Europe during March / April 2014, with further European dates alongside Foreigner and a series of headline shows in the Netherlands, Germany, Spain and Portugal taking them into May. To coincide with this tour FM released a new eleven-track EP entitled Futurama on 31 March 2014. Futurama includes four new studio tracks, six new live recordings and an extended mix.

The second half of 2014 featured FM's 30th Anniversary celebrations. They headlined Cambridge Rock Festival on Saturday 9 August 2014 with Bernie Marsden joining FM onstage during the encore for a rendition of "Here I Go Again". Bernie Marsden joined FM again for the encore at The River Rooms in Stourbridge during their 30th Anniversary Tour in November. The tour also took in shows at Southampton, Cardiff, Bingley, Southend and Holmfirth with special guests including Toby Jepson, Hand Of Dimes and Three Lions. A late cancellation by Vandenberg's Moonkings and a call from the Planet Rock festival organisers resulted in FM rounding off 2014 with a surprise appearance on the main stage at Planet Rockstock on Sunday 7 December.

FM released their ninth studio album Heroes and Villains via Frontiers Records on 20 April 2015 (UK / Europe) and 21 April 2015 (USA) and embarked on a UK tour in May with Special Guests Romeo's Daughter and No Hot Ashes. The track "Shape I'm In" from the new album was added to the BBC Radio 2 playlist from Saturday 4 April 2015. Festival appearances in 2015 included Nantwich Jazz, Frontiers Rock Festival in Italy (FM's first-ever performance in Italy), Rock The Ring in Switzerland, Graspop Metal Meeting in Belgium, Netherlands festival Bospop, Team Rock's inaugural Ramblin' Man Fair in Maidstone, Steelhouse Festival in Wales and two festivals in Sweden at Skogsröjet in Rejmyre and Helgeåfestivalen in Knislinge. In November 2015 FM continued their European Tour with more UK dates followed by a co-headline run of shows in mainland Europe with Electric Boys. Their last show of the year was headlining Planet Rockstock, the band's third appearance at the festival in three years.

FM's Heroes and Villains tour continued through 2016 with dates across the UK in January (Special Guests Romeo's Daughter, The King Lot, Bernie Marsden and No Hot Ashes). Festival appearances included The Great British Rock & Blues Festival, Rockweekend AOR and Väsby Rock Festival in Sweden, and Nantwich Jazz, Blues & Music Festival. The band also featured as Special Guests on Heart's "She Devils" UK tour in the summer of 2016, performing at London's Royal Albert Hall, Manchester O2 Apollo, Glasgow Royal Concert Hall and Birmingham Symphony Hall.

Also in 2016 FM celebrated the 30th anniversary of their debut album with the release of Indiscreet 30, re-recording the original tracks to update the album - "We are not trying to recreate the original, but this is our interpretation played by FM as we are today with the sound of FM 2016" explained Merv Goldsworthy.

In 2017 FM played their first-ever show in Greece to a sell-out crowd along with appearances at HRH AOR festival, a unique triple-headline bill alongside The Quireboys and Gun as part of the Castell Roc Music Festival at Chepstow Castle, Escape Open Air and HEAT festivals in Germany, Rock & Blues Custom Show in Pentrich and a return to Cambridge Rock Festival.

FM's eleventh studio album Atomic Generation was released on 30 March 2018 via Frontiers Records (14 March 2018 in Japan). In addition to shows across the UK throughout 2018 - including dates with Dare and Toby Jepson - FM appeared at Frontiers Rock Festival in Milan on 29 April and played the USA for the first time when they headlined at Melodic Rock Fest 5 in Chicago on 6 May, following this with a headline set at the sister festival Melodic Rock Fest Scandinavia in Malmö on 1 June.

In September 2018 FM accepted an invitation to join Saxon as Special Guests on their "Thunderbolt Tour Part 2" to replace previously announced Y&T whose singer / guitarist Dave Meniketti was suffering from a serious back injury and thus unable to embark on the tour. The three-band bill toured throughout Europe from 19 September to 16 October with Raven as opening act and with Wayward Sons opening for four shows in the UK 18–21 October. With current keyboardist Jem Davis unable to join FM for the European shows at such short notice, the band recruited guest keyboard player and original band member Didge Digital for the European dates with Jem Davis performing at the UK shows.

=== 2019 onwards ===
On 22 February 2019 FM released via Frontiers Records The Italian Job, a live DVD/CD package (also on Blu-ray) of their set at the Frontiers Rock Festival in Milan, Italy on 29 April 2018. FM's twelfth studio album Synchronized was released on 22 May 2020 via Frontiers Records. The band's thirteenth studio album, aptly titled Thirteen, was released by Frontiers Records on 18 March 2022. Prior to the release of Thirteen, and to celebrate the 30th anniversary of their second album Tough It Out, FM via Frontiers records released a live version of the album, Tough It Out Live. The 2CD set was released on 4 September 2021. Post-Covid-19 the band resumed touring, and during 2022 undertook a European tour and supported The Dead Daisies across the UK. For 2023 dates include in May a 12-date co-headline tour with Dare and Tyketto.

The death of founder member Chris Overland was announced on 24 August 2023.

== Members ==
=== Current members ===
- Merv Goldsworthy – bass, backing vocals (1984–1995, 2007–present)
- Pete Jupp – drums, backing vocals (1984–1995, 2007–present)
- Steve Overland – lead vocals, rhythm guitar (1984–1995, 2007–present)
- Jem Davis – keyboards, synthesizer, organ, piano, keytar, harmonica, backing vocals (1993–1995, 2007–present)
- Jim Kirkpatrick – lead guitar, backing vocals (2008–present)

=== Former members ===
- Didge Digital – keyboards, keytar, occasional backing vocals (1984–1991)
- Chris Overland – lead guitar, backing vocals (1984–1990; died 2023)
- Andy Barnett – lead guitar, backing vocals (1990–1995, 2007–2008)
- Tony Mitman – keyboards (1992)
- Charlie Olins - keyboards, piano (1992) (tour only)
- Mitt Gamon - harmonica (1992) (tour only)

=== Lineups ===
Years	Lineup	Albums
1984–1990	Steve Overland – lead vocals, rhythm guitar; Chris Overland – lead guitar, backing vocals; Didge Digital – keyboards, keytar, occasional backing vocals; Merv Goldsworthy – bass, backing vocals; Pete Jupp – drums, backing vocals	Indiscreet (1986); Tough It Out (1989)
1990–1991	Steve Overland – lead vocals, rhythm guitar; Didge Digital – keyboards, keytar, occasional backing vocals; Merv Goldsworthy – bass, backing vocals; Pete Jupp – drums, backing vocals; Andy Barnett – lead guitar, backing vocals	Takin' It to the Streets (1991)
1992	Steve Overland – lead vocals, rhythm guitar; Merv Goldsworthy – bass, backing vocals; Pete Jupp – drums, backing vocals; Andy Barnett – lead guitar, backing vocals; Tony Mitman – keyboards	Aphrodisiac (1992)
1993–1995	Steve Overland – lead vocals, rhythm guitar; Merv Goldsworthy – bass, backing vocals; Pete Jupp – drums, backing vocals; Andy Barnett – lead guitar, backing vocals; Jem Davis – keyboards, keytar, backing vocals	Dead Man's Shoes (1995)
1995–2007	Disbanded
2007–2008	Steve Overland – lead vocals, rhythm guitar; Merv Goldsworthy – bass, backing vocals; Pete Jupp – drums, backing vocals; Andy Barnett – lead guitar, backing vocals; Jem Davis – keyboards, keytar, backing vocals
2008–present	Steve Overland – lead vocals, rhythm guitar; Merv Goldsworthy – bass, backing vocals; Pete Jupp – drums, backing vocals; Jem Davis – keyboards, keytar, backing vocals; Jim Kirkpatrick – lead guitar, backing vocals	Metropolis (2010); Rockville (2013); Rockville II (2013); Heroes and Villains (2015); Atomic Generation (2018); Synchronized (2020); Thirteen (2022); Old Habits Die Hard (2024)

== Discography ==
Studio albums

- Indiscreet (1986)
- Tough It Out (1989)
- Takin' It to the Streets (1991)
- Aphrodisiac (1992)
- Dead Man's Shoes (1995)
- Metropolis (2010)
- Rockville (2013)
- Rockville II (2013)
- Heroes and Villains (2015)
- Indiscreet 30 (2016)
- Atomic Generation (2018)
- Synchronized (2020)
- Thirteen (2022)
- Old Habits Die Hard (2024)
- Brotherhood (2025)

Compilation albums

- Only the Strong: The Very Best of FM 1984-1994 (1994)
- Closer to Heaven (1996)
- Paraphernalia (Double album - the second one is live) (1996)
- Long Time No See (Triple album - the third one is live) (2003)
- Long Lost Friends (Double album) (2005)
- Vintage and Rare (2006)

Live albums

- Live at the Astoria (1989)
- No Electricity Required (Double live album) (1993)
- The Italian Job (2019)
- Tough It Out Live (2021)

EPs

- The Blues & Soul EP (1993)
- Wildside EP (2009)
- City Limits EP (2011)
- Only Foolin' EP (2012)
- Futurama (2014)

DVD

- Back in the Saddle (2008)
- Live in Europe (2012)
- Indiscreet 25 Live (2013)
- The Italian Job (2019)

VHS

- Live Acoustical Intercourse (1993)

Special release

- Numbered and autographed box 7" single: "Let Love Be the Leader" / "Let Love Be the Leader" (Live) 1987
