= More (band) =

British heavy metal band

- Origin: London, England
- Genre: Heavy metal
- Years active: 1980–1982, 1985, 1998–2000; 2011–present
- Labels: Warhead Music LLP (2025-Present), Atlantic Records (1981-1982)
- Members: Johnny Trowbridge; Baz Nicholls; Steve Rix; Peter Welsh
- Website: Facebook.com/MOREthebandofficial

More is a British heavy metal band formed during the new wave of British heavy metal scene in the early 1980s. Their first two albums and two singles were recorded on major label, Atlantic Records. More toured with Iron Maiden on the ‘Killers’ tour, played the German rock festival 'Golden Summer Night' at Stuttgart and Darmstadt in August 1981, as well as the 'Monsters of Rock' festival at Donington Park one week later. As of 2026, More is still active and playing live with a full-length album, 'Destructor', originally recorded during 2017 and later released in October 2025.

== Career ==
Initially the band More was fronted by vocalist Paul Mario Day, who had sung in an early incarnation of Iron Maiden. By the time of their second album, Frank Darch and Laurie Mansworth had left, the latter going on to form the band Airrace. Andy John Burton was recruited as the new drummer and the band became a four-piece. Bassist Brian Day also left during the recording of the second album, to be replaced by Barry 'Baz' Nicholls, who has since remained a constant member in the line-up.

Following Paul Mario Day's subsequent departure from the band, the line-up of Cox, Nicholls, Burton and vocalist Mick Stratton released a 7" single called "Trickster" in 1982, before splitting up.

Kenny Cox revived More briefly in 1985, with vocalist Ron Jackson, guitarist Mel Jones, bassist Baz Nicholls, and Paul George on drums. Following that, Kenny Cox moved on to the band Mammoth, with ex-Gillan and Sun Red Sun bassist John McCoy and ex-Samson vocalist Nicky Moore

Cox and Nicholls reformed More in the spring of 1998, with Mike Freeland featuring on vocals. A track called "My Obsession" was recorded by this incarnation of the band.

In 2011, Andy John Burton, Baz Nicholls (bass; joined More in 1982), Mike Freeland (vocals; part of More's 1999 line-up), Paul Stickles (guitar; also with the band Dangerous Breed) and special guest Chris Tsangarides assembled to perform the More back catalogue as “Exmore”. They performed live at the 'Headbangers Open Air' festival in July 2011, with a warm-up show taking place at the Astor Theatre in Deal, Kent, plus a post-festival club show the following Sunday. Following an enthusiastic reaction from the audience at this concert, the bandmembers made the collective decision to continue performing.

The band played a co-headlining show with Marseille at the Sir Robert Peel venue in Kingston upon Thames, Surrey on 15 October 2011.

The following year, the band changed their name to More 2012 and scheduled further shows, including: 26 May at the Railway venue in Bolton, 23 November at the Red Lion pub in Gravesend, Kent, and 1 December at the 'Hard Rock Hell VI' festival, with Steve Rix on drums.

An appearance at the 'Metalwave UK' festival in Purfleet, Essex, alongside Praying Mantis, Dennis Stratton, Cloven Hoof, Chariot and Deep Machine, took place on 5 October 2013, followed by a performance at the 'Heavy Metal Maniacs' festival in Amstelveen on 19 October 2013.

In 2013, Dave John Ross, a guitarist who was first approached to replace Kenny Cox in 2000, stepped in following the departure of Paul Stickles. Further concert appearances were then scheduled for the 'Bang Your Head!!!' festival in Balingen on 12 July 2014, and the 'Hard Rock Hell VII' festival in Pwllheli on 15 November 2014.

In 2015, the band played at the 'Legends of Rock' festival in Great Yarmouth and the 'Hard Rock Hell VIII' festival in Pwllheli.

In November and December 2016, the band undertook a short European tour as special guests of German band Bonfire, taking in shows in Belgium, Germany and Holland.

Chris Tsangarides died on 6 January 2018, immediately followed by the resignation of vocalist Mike Freeland.

Andy John Burton died on 7 November 2021.

Kenny Cox died on 21 June 2022.

JAM at the Farm 2018 - A TRIBUTE TO CHRIS TSANGARIDES took place on the 7th of October 2018 with a line up that included the three remaining members, Baz Nicholls (bass), Steve Rix (drums) and Dave John Ross (guitar), with the addition of former vocalist, Mike Freeland, former guitarist, Paul Stickles and guest vocalist Chris 'Stoz' Storozynski (Forged In Black) completing the line up for this one-off tribute concert. A Video single 'Rocquiem' was released in conjunction with this event, being the only official video featuring all recording members of the album 'Destructor', (later released in 2025/26).

In March 2022, a revamped More announced the recruitment of Polish vocalist Roman Kańtoch (ex-Kruk). However, this proved to be short-lived, and Mike Freeland returned to the band in August 2023, with Peter Welsh (ex-Tytan) joining on guitar. This saw More return to performing live, notably headlining 'Taken by Force' Festival in the Netherlands in November 2024.

As of 2025, More were scheduled to play at various festivals, including the 'Hammerdown NWOBHM All-Dayer' at the Cart and Horses venue in London on 18 May 2025, 'Sonic Rock Solstice' in Stoke Prior on 20 June 2025, 'Mearfest Space' in Nuneaton on 29 August 2025, and 'British Steel Saturday Night XII' in Fismes, France on 4 October 2025. The band released a full-length album, “Destructor”, on 4 October 2025, featuring songs written by Kenny Cox and Chris Tsangarides, who had also produced and played guitar on the recordings.

Original vocalist Paul Mario Day died on 29 July 2025 after a battle with cancer.

More released two video singles for "Scream" and "Spirits of War" in September 2026 on their YouTube channel https://www.youtube.com/@morebandofficial/playlists

In September 2026, long time frontman Mike Freeland announced his retirement from music due to ill health endorsing Johnny Trowbridge (ex Tara’s Secret) as his successor in a press release from the band’s management. More performed their first show with Johnny Trowbridge at the Belper 250 Rocks Festival on 19th September 2026 and announced the band is working on new material for the follow up album to "Destructor" and booking new tours and festival dates.

== Line-ups ==
1980–1981

- Paul Mario Day - Vocals
- Kenny Cox - Guitar
- Paul Todd - Guitar
- Brian Day - Bass
- Frank Darch - Drums

1981–1982 (Warhead)

- Paul Mario Day - Vocals
- Kenny Cox - Guitar
- Laurie Mansworth - Guitar
- Brian Day - Bass
- Frank Darch - Drums

1982 (Blood & Thunder)

- Mick Stratton - Vocals
- Kenny Cox - Guitar
- Brian Day - Bass
- Andy John Burton - Drums

1982

- Mick Stratton - Vocals
- Kenny Cox - Guitar
- Baz Nicholls - Bass
- Andy John Burton - Drums

1985

- Ron Jackson - Vocals
- Kenny Cox - Guitar
- Mel Jones - Guitar
- Baz Nicholls - Bass
- Paul George - Drums

1998–2000

- Mike Freeland - Vocals
- Kenny Cox - Guitar
- Baz Nicholls - Bass
- Rick Dyat / Andy Robinson - Drums

2011-2012

- Mike Freeland - Vocals
- Chris Tsangarides - Guitar
- Paul Stickles - Guitar
- Baz Nicholls - Bass
- Andy John Burton - Drums

2013 - 2018 (Destructor)

- Mike Freeland - Vocals
- Chris Tsangarides - Guitar
- Dave John Ross - Guitar
- Baz Nicholls - Bass
- Steve Rix - Drums

2018 - 2023 (Vocalist search/Covid lockdown years)

- Dyan Mair / Jamie Pattenden / Roman Kańtoch - Vocals
- Dave John Ross - Guitar
- Baz Nicholls - Bass
- Steve Rix - Drums

2023 - September 2023

- Mike Freeland - Vocals
- Dave John Ross - Guitar
- Baz Nicholls - Bass
- Steve Rix - Drums

2023 - 2026

- Mike Freeland - Vocals
- Peter Welsh
- Baz Nicholls - Bass
- Steve Rix - Drums

2026 - Present

- Johnny Trowbridge - Vocals
- Peter Welsh - Guitar
- Baz Nicholls - Bass
- Steve Rix - Drums

== Discography ==
=== Albums ===
Warhead (Atlantic Records, 1981)

1. "Warhead" - 3:47
2. "Fire" (The Crazy World of Arthur Brown cover) - 3:31
3. "Soldier" - 4:52
4. "Depression" - 5:00
5. "Road Rocket" - 3:54
6. "Lord of Twilight" - 4:48
7. "Way of the World" - 3:42
8. "We Are the Band" - 4:30
9. "I Have No Answers" - 5:42

Total length: 39:46

Blood & Thunder (Atlantic Records, 1982)

1. "Killer on the Prowl" - 5:11
2. "Blood & Thunder" - 3:46
3. "I Just Can't Believe It" - 4:16
4. "I've Been Waiting" - 3:21
5. "Traitors Gate" - 4:11
6. "Rock and Roll" - 4:30
7. "I Wanna Take You" - 3:15
8. "Go Home" - 3:15
9. "The Eye" - 2:40
10. "Nightmare" - 6:10

Total length: 40:35

Destructor (Recorded during 2017/ released via Warhead Music LLP in October 2025)

1. “Hearts on Fire”
2. “Rocquiem”
3. “Scream”
4. “New World”
5. “Destructor”
6. “Spirits of War”
7. “Immortal”
8. “My Obsession”
9. “Wolf Behind Your Eyes”
10. “More”

=== Singles ===
- "We Are the Band" / "Atomic Rock" (Atlantic Records, 1981) - UK No. 59
- "Trickster" / "Hey Joe" (Atlantic Records, 1982)

== See also ==
- List of new wave of British heavy metal bands
