= Mind the Acoustic Pieces =

Studio album by Maiden uniteD
- Released: 9 December 2010
- Recorded: 6 D.C. Studio, Sandlane Studios and Audiocult.
- Genre: Acoustic rock
- Length: 45:10
- Language: English
- Producer: Ruud Jolie and Joey Bruers

Mind the Acoustic Pieces is the first studio album by Maiden uniteD. It is an all-acoustic reinterpretation of the 1983 Iron Maiden album Piece of Mind with rearranged music for an acoustic setting

== Background ==
Joey Bruers and Ruud Jolie rewrote the entire Piece of Mind album for their Maiden uniteD project. Maiden uniteD is a project that plays Iron Maiden songs acoustically with new arrangements, featuring guest musicians from different bands.

== Track listing ==
No.	Title	Writer(s)	Length
1.	"Where Eagles Dare"	Steve Harris	5:08
2.	"The Trooper"	Harris	5:57
3.	"Quest for Fire"	Harris	3:50
4.	"Still Life"	Dave Murray, Harris	4:21
5.	"Revelations"	Bruce Dickinson	6:32
6.	"Die with Your Boots On"	Dickinson, Smith, Harris	4:35
7.	"Flight of Icarus"	Dickinson, Adrian Smith	5:06
8.	"Sun and Steel"	Dickinson, Smith	3:34
9.	"To Tame a Land"	Harris	6:07

== Single and different album versions ==
The single "The Trooper" was released on November 20, 2010 featuring an alternate version of "Sun and Steel" with Anneke van Giersbergen on vocals.
Mind the Acoustic Pieces was released on CD December 9, 2010.
On April 1, 2011, Maiden uniteD released a limited vinyl edition of the album featuring the alternate version of "Sun and Steel" with Anneke van Giersbergen on vocals.

== Personnel ==
Damian Wilson: Vocals
Ruud Jolie: Guitar
Joey Bruers: Bass
Marco Kuypers: Piano
Mike Coolen: Drums
Anneke van Giersbergen: Guest vocals on "To Tame a Land" and on "Sun and Steel" (vinyl edition)
