= Maiden uniteD =

European acoustic cover band project

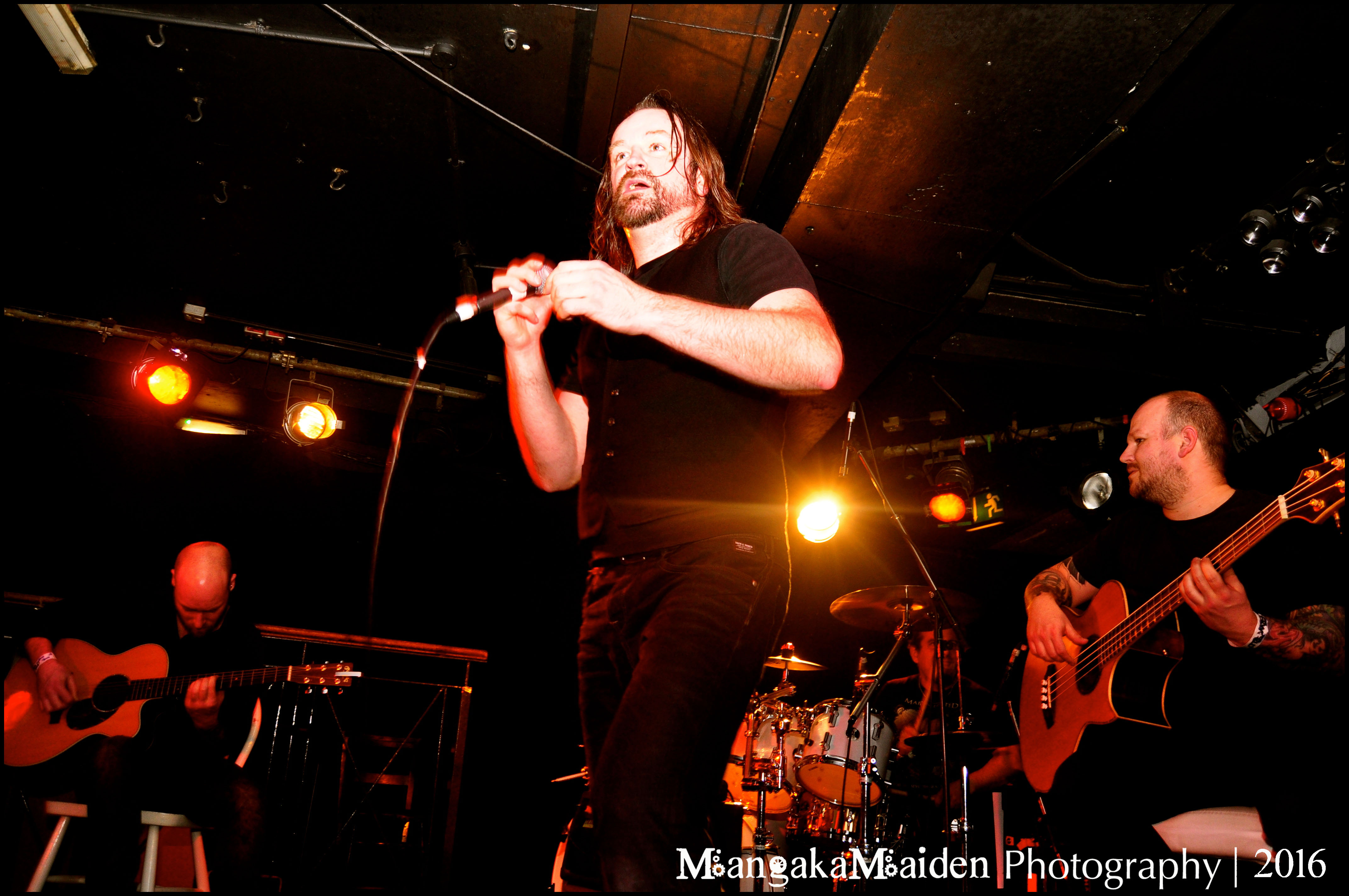
- The band performing in 2016

Background information
- Origin: United Kingdom, Netherlands
- Genres: Acoustic rock, influenced by heavy metal
- Years active: 2006–present
- Label: Private Management
- Members: Damian Wilson; Ruud Jolie; Joey Bruers; Marco Kuypers; Mike Coolen; Perttu Kivilaakso; Anneke van Giersbergen
- Website: www.MaidenuniteD.com

Maiden uniteD is an acoustic project. Musicians from different bands join to play an all-acoustic tribute to English heavy metal band Iron Maiden. The songs are played with new arrangements.

The project is not affiliated with the Los Angeles-based Iron Maiden tribute band of the same name, Maiden United.

== About ==
In 2006, Joey Bruers was asked to perform a tribute at a convention for the Dutch Iron Maiden fan club in Dynamo, Eindhoven. Together with several musicians he played a set of acoustic Iron Maiden songs. Steve Harris attended the convention and gave the band ‘two thumbs up’.

There were a few more shows like this and then he started to write new acoustic arrangements for a series of songs with Ruud Jolie (Within Temptation).

They began to search for musicians to record these songs and on 9 December 2010 their first album was released; Mind the Acoustic Pieces, an all-acoustic reinterpretation of Iron Maiden's classic album Piece of Mind.

The album was supported by the "Pieces Over Europe Tour" (December 2010 - April 2011). Maiden uniteD played at the 2011 Wacken Open Air festival in Germany and they played at the 2011 Download festival in the UK.

Their second album 'Across The Seventh Sea' was released in September 2012 and followed by a European tour in November and December. This album contains rearranged songs from several Iron Maiden albums. Perttu Kivilaakso (Apocalyptica) plays cello on the tracks 'The Evil That Men Do' and 'Infinite Dreams'.

Maiden uniteD brought their third album Remembrance out in 2015. There are also special guests on this album such as ex Iron Maiden singers Paul Di'Anno and Blaze Bayley. Next to them are Wudstik, Marcela Bovio of Stream of Passion and ex Iron Maiden drummer Thunderstick also on the album. A European tour follows from September through December.

== Discography ==
=== Albums ===
- Mind the Acoustic Pieces (2010)
- Mind the Acoustic Pieces (ltd. Vinyl edition) (2011)
- Across the Seventh Sea (2012)
- Across the Seventh Sea (ltd. Vinyl edition) (2012)
- Remembrance (2015)
- Empire of the Clouds [E.P.] (2018)
- The Barrel House Tapes (2019)

=== Singles ===
- The Trooper/Sun and Steel (with Anneke van Giersbergen on vocals) (2011)
- Strange World (2015)

== Current members ==
- Joey Bruers (Up The Irons): : Bass

== Guest Members on Tour ==
- Perttu Kivilaakso (Apocalyptica): Cello
- Anneke van Giersbergen (formerly The Gathering), (Devin Townsend), (Ayreon): Vocals
- Luke Appleton (Blaze Bayley, Absolva): Bass
- Lee Morris (formerly Paradise Lost): Drums
- Huub van Loon (Dearworld): Keyboards
- Joe Lazarus (Voodoo Six): Drums
- Marcela Bovio (formerly Stream of Passion), (MaYaN), (Ayreon): Vocals
- Martijn Balsters (The Dust Connection): Guitar
- Wudstik (Ayreon), (For all we Know): Vocals
- Tom Sikkers (Daybroke): Guitar
- Dennis Stratton (formerly Iron Maiden): Guitar
- Stef Broks (Textures): Drums

== Former members ==
- Marco Kuypers (Cloudmachine): Piano
- Mike Coolen (Within Temptation): Drums
- Damian Wilson (Threshold, Ayreon, Star One, Headspace, Landmarq): Vocals
- Ruud Jolie (Within Temptation, For all we Know): Guitar
- Thijs Schrijnemakers (Orgel Vreten): Keyboards

== Concert tours ==
| Duration | Concert tour | Lineups | | | | | | |
| Duration | Concert tour | Vocals | Bass | Guitars | Drums | Keyboards | Guests on Tour | Gigs |
|---|---|---|---|---|---|---|---|---|
| 2010/2011 | Mind the Acoustic Pieces Tour | Damian Wilson | Joey Bruers | Ruud Jolie | Mike Coolen | Marko Kuypers | Anneke van Giersbergen | 24 |
| 2012/2013 | Across the Seventh Sea Tour | Damian Wilson | Joey Bruers | Ruud Jolie | Stef Broks | Huub van Loon / Thijs Schrijnemakers | Perttu Kivilaakso / Luke Appleton / Lee Morris / Martijn Balsters / Tom Sikkers / Wudstik | 42 |
| 2015 | Remembrance Tour | Damian Wilson | Joey Bruers | Ruud Jolie | Dirk Bruinenberg | Huub van Loon / Thijs Schrijnemakers | Marcela Bovio, Wudstik, Joe Lazarus | tba |
