= Cart and Horses =

Pub in Stratford, London, England

Coordinates: 51°32′45″N 0°0′16″E

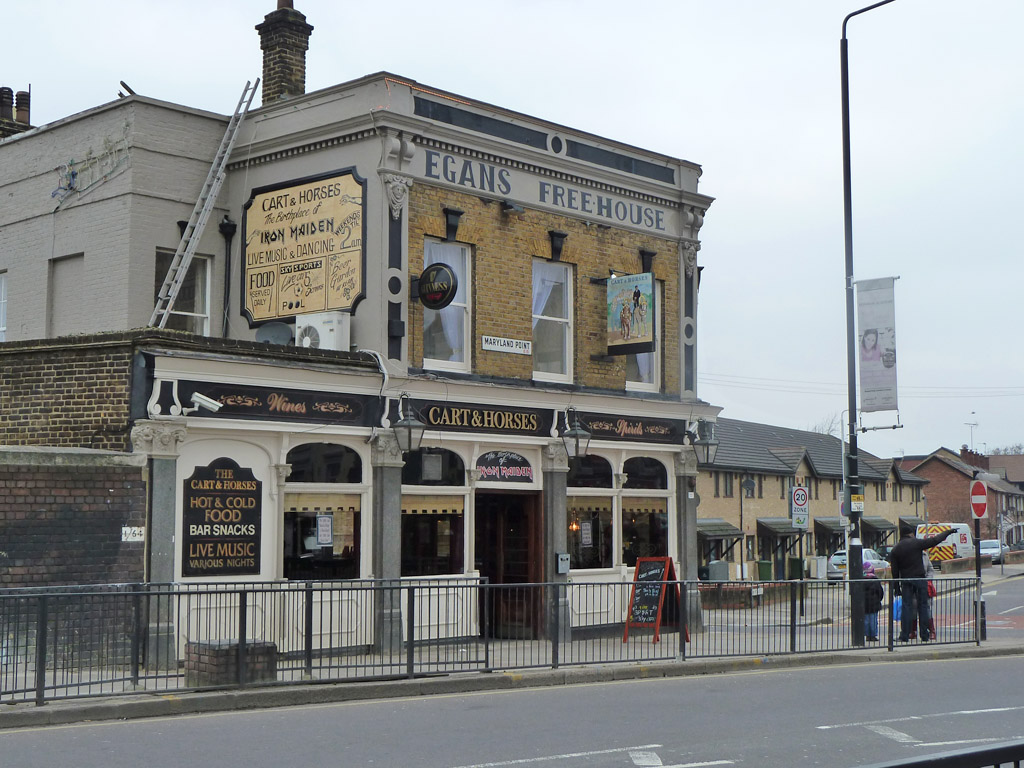
The pub in 2013, a sign advertising it as "the birthplace of Iron Maiden"

The Cart and Horses is a pub in Stratford, London, next to Maryland railway station. Established in the early 19th century, it was an early venue for the heavy metal band Iron Maiden in the late 1970s and it became associated with the group.

== Location ==
The pub is on the corner of Maryland Point, Leytonstone Road and Windmill Lane. It is adjacent to Maryland railway station. In the early 20th century, this was part of the A11, the main road from London to Norwich.

== History ==
There has been a pub in Stratford with this name since 1765. In the early 19th century, it was on The Grove, adjoining Stratford House, at what later became nos 150–52. These buildings survived until around 1970, and featured typical 18th century balusters in the staircases.

Around 1805, the pub moved to its current location at Maryland Point. The premises were rebuilt around 1880.

The heavy metal band Iron Maiden first performed at the pub in 1976 with a line-up including founder and leader Steve Harris. They performed several times at the venue that year, and their appearance on 21 December was Dave Murray's first with the group. By 1977, the group's performances were becoming so popular, they were stretching the venue's capacity. After an altercation at a gig on 23 May, they were banned from the pub. They returned for a final gig on 7 April 1978. Live music is still an important feature of the venue, which promotes its associations with the group. In 2020, the basement was renovated to allow an audience of up to 80.
