= Iron Maiden =

English heavy metal band

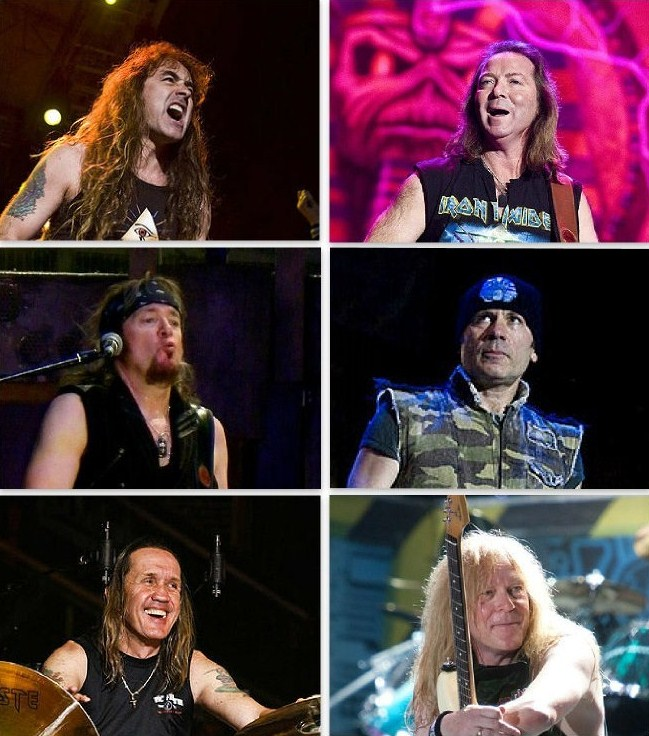
- Iron Maiden Lineup since 1999; Top: Steve Harris (L), Dave Murray (R); Middle: Adrian Smith (L), Bruce Dickinson (R); Bottom: Nicko McBrain (L), Janick Gers (R)

Background information
- Origin: London, England
- Genre: Heavy metal
- Works: Discography; songs; tours
- Years active: 1975–present
- Labels: EMI; Parlophone; BMG; UMe; Sanctuary; Legacy; Columbia; Portrait; CMC; Epic; Capitol; Harvest
- Members: Steve Harris; Dave Murray; Adrian Smith; Bruce Dickinson; Nicko McBrain; Janick Gers
- Past members: See former members
- Website: ironmaiden.com

Iron Maiden are an English heavy metal band formed in Leyton, East London, in 1975 by bassist and primary songwriter Steve Harris. Although fluid in the early years of the band, the line-up for most of the band's history has consisted of Harris, lead vocalist Bruce Dickinson, drummer Nicko McBrain, and guitarists Dave Murray, Adrian Smith and Janick Gers. As pioneers of the new wave of British heavy metal movement, Iron Maiden released a series of UK and US Platinum and Gold albums, including 1980's eponymous debut album, 1981's Killers, and 1982's The Number of the Beast – its first album with Dickinson, who in 1981 replaced Paul Di'Anno as lead singer. The addition of Dickinson was a turning point in their career, establishing them as one of heavy metal's most important bands. The Number of the Beast is among the most popular heavy metal albums of all time, having sold almost 20 million copies worldwide.

After some turbulence in the 1990s, the return of Dickinson and Smith in 1999 led to a resurgence in popularity, with a series of new albums and highly successful tours. Their three most recent albums — The Final Frontier (2010), The Book of Souls (2015), and Senjutsu (2021) — have all reached number 1 in more than 25 countries. Iron Maiden have sold over 130 million copies of their albums worldwide and have obtained over 600 certifications. The band is considered to be one of the most influential and revered heavy metal bands of all time. They have received multiple industry awards, including the Grammy and Brit Awards. Iron Maiden were inducted into the Rock and Roll Hall of Fame in 2026 as performers.

The band have released 41 albums, including 17 studio albums, 13 live albums, four EPs, and seven compilations. They have also released 47 singles, 20 video albums, and 2 video games. Iron Maiden's lyrics cover such topics as history, literature, war, mythology, dark fantasy, science fiction, society, and religion. As of October 2019, the band have played 2,500 live shows. For over 40 years the band have featured their signature mascot, "Eddie", on the covers of almost all of their releases.

== History ==
=== Early years (1975–1978) ===
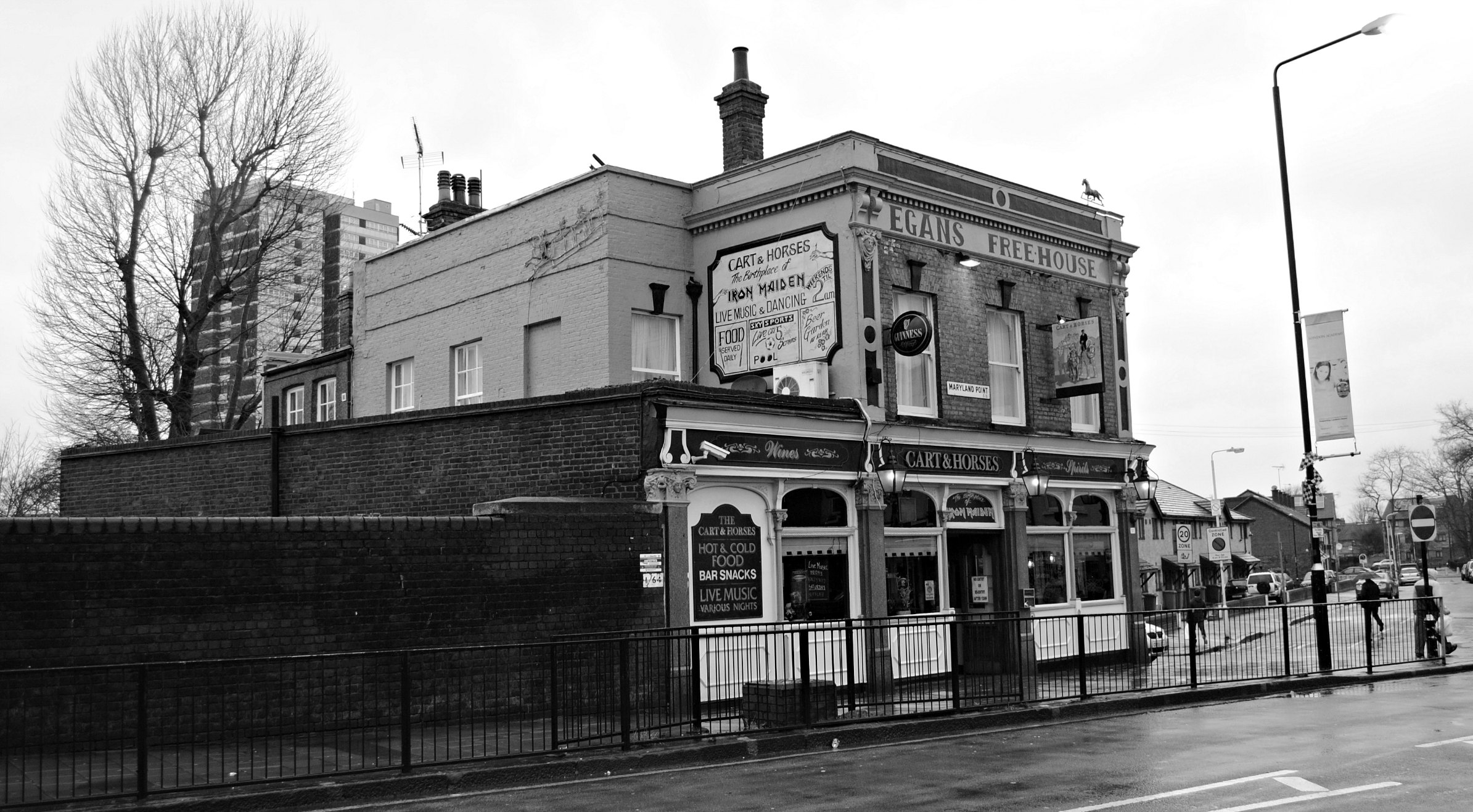
The Cart and Horses, located in Maryland Point, Stratford, was where Iron Maiden played some of their first shows in 1976. The building was officially named "The Birthplace of Iron Maiden".

Bassist Steve Harris formed Iron Maiden in the autumn of 1975. Harris attributed the band's name to a film adaptation of The Man in the Iron Mask from the novel by Alexandre Dumas, as the title reminded him of the iron maiden torture device. They originally used the name Ash Mountain, but most of the band members preferred the name Iron Maiden. After months of rehearsal, Iron Maiden made their debut at St. Nicks Hall in Poplar on 1 May 1976, before taking up a semi-residency at the Cart and Horses Pub in Maryland, Stratford. The original line-up was short-lived, with vocalist Paul Mario Day being the first to go as, according to Harris, he lacked "energy or charisma on stage". He was replaced by Dennis Wilcock, a Kiss fan who used makeup and fake blood during live performances and had earlier played with Harris and Doug Sampson in the band Smiler. Wilcock's friend, guitarist Dave Murray, was invited to join, much to the dismay of the band's guitarists Dave Sullivan and Terry Rance. Their frustration led Harris to temporarily disband Iron Maiden in 1976, though the group reformed soon after with Murray as the sole guitarist. Harris and Murray remain the band's longest-serving members and have performed on all of their releases.

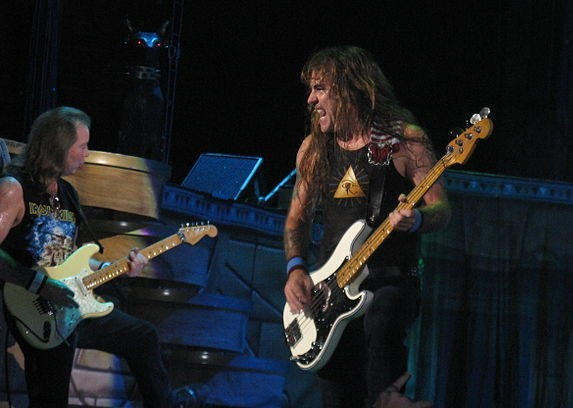
Dave Murray and Steve Harris in 2008. Harris and Murray are the only members to have performed on all of the band's albums.

Iron Maiden recruited another guitarist in 1977, Bob Sawyer, who was sacked for embarrassing the band on stage by pretending to play guitar with his teeth. Tension ensued again, causing a rift between Murray and Wilcock, who convinced Harris to fire Murray, as well as original drummer Ron Matthews. A new line-up was put together, including future Cutting Crew member Tony Moore on keyboards, Terry Wapram on guitar and drummer Barry Purkis (better known today as Thunderstick). After a single gig with the band in January 1978, Moore was asked to leave as Harris decided keyboards did not suit the band's sound. Dave Murray rejoined in late March 1978, and when Terry Wapram disapproved he was sacked. A few weeks later, Dennis Wilcock decided to leave Iron Maiden to form his own band, V1, with Wapram, and drummer Barry Purkis also left. Former Smiler drummer Doug Sampson was at Dennis' and Thunderstick's last gig, and joined the band afterwards.

Harris, Murray and Sampson spent the summer and autumn of 1978 rehearsing while they searched for a singer to complete the band's new line-up. A chance meeting at the Red Lion, a pub in Leytonstone, in November 1978 evolved into a successful audition for vocalist Paul Di'Anno. Steve Harris said, "There's sort of a quality in Paul's voice, a raspiness in his voice, or whatever you want to call it, that just gave it this great edge". At this time, Murray would typically act as their sole guitarist, with Harris commenting, "Davey was so good he could do a lot of it on his own. The plan was always to get a second guitarist in, but finding one that could match Davey was really difficult".

=== Record contract and early releases (1978–1981) ===
On New Year's Eve, 1978, Iron Maiden recorded a four-song demo at Spaceward Studios in Cambridge. Hoping the recording would help them secure more gigs, the band gave a copy to Neal Kay, who, at the time, was managing a heavy metal club called "Bandwagon Heavy Metal Soundhouse". After hearing the tape, Kay began playing the demo regularly at the Bandwagon, and one of the songs, "Prowler", eventually went to number 1 in the Soundhouse charts, which were published weekly in Sounds magazine. A copy was also acquired by Rod Smallwood, who soon became the band's manager. As Iron Maiden's popularity increased, they released the demo on their own record label as The Soundhouse Tapes, named after the club. Featuring only three tracks (one song, "Strange World", was excluded as the band were unsatisfied with its production), all 5,000 copies sold out within weeks.

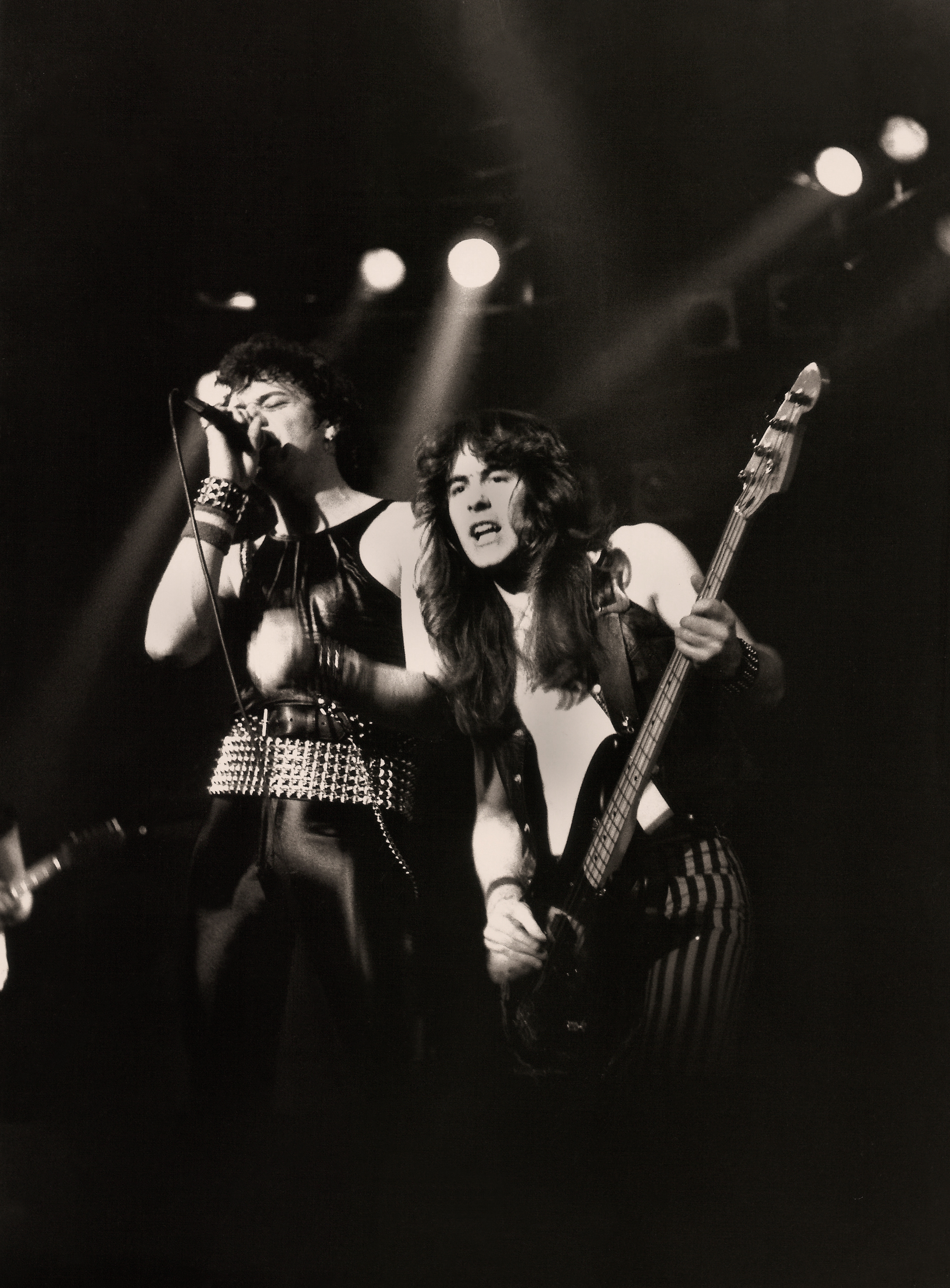
Paul Di'Anno and Steve Harris supporting Judas Priest on their British Steel Tour, 1980

In December 1979, the band secured a major record deal with EMI and asked Dave Murray's childhood friend, Adrian Smith of Urchin, to join the group as their second guitarist. Busy with his own band, Smith declined and Dennis Stratton was hired instead. Shortly after, Doug Sampson left due to health issues and was replaced by ex-Samson drummer Clive Burr at Stratton's suggestion on 26 December 1979. Iron Maiden's first appearance on an EMI album was on the Metal for Muthas compilation (released on 15 February 1980) with two early versions of "Sanctuary" and "Wrathchild". The release led to a tour including several other bands linked with the new wave of British heavy metal movement.

Iron Maiden released their self-titled debut album in 1980, which debuted at number 4 in the UK Albums Chart. In addition to the title track, the album included other early favourites such as "Running Free", "Transylvania", "Phantom of the Opera" and "Sanctuary" – which was not on the original UK release, but appeared on the US version and subsequent remasters. The band embarked on a headline tour of the UK, before opening for Kiss on their 1980 Unmasked Tour's European leg as well as supporting Judas Priest on select dates. After the Kiss tour, Dennis Stratton was dismissed from the band as a result of creative and personal differences, and was replaced by Smith in October 1980. In December, the band played at the Rainbow Theatre in London, where their first live video was filmed. Live at the Rainbow was released in May 1981, and "Iron Maiden" and "Wrathchild" from this video received heavy rotation on MTV during its first hours on the air as the first metal videos ever.

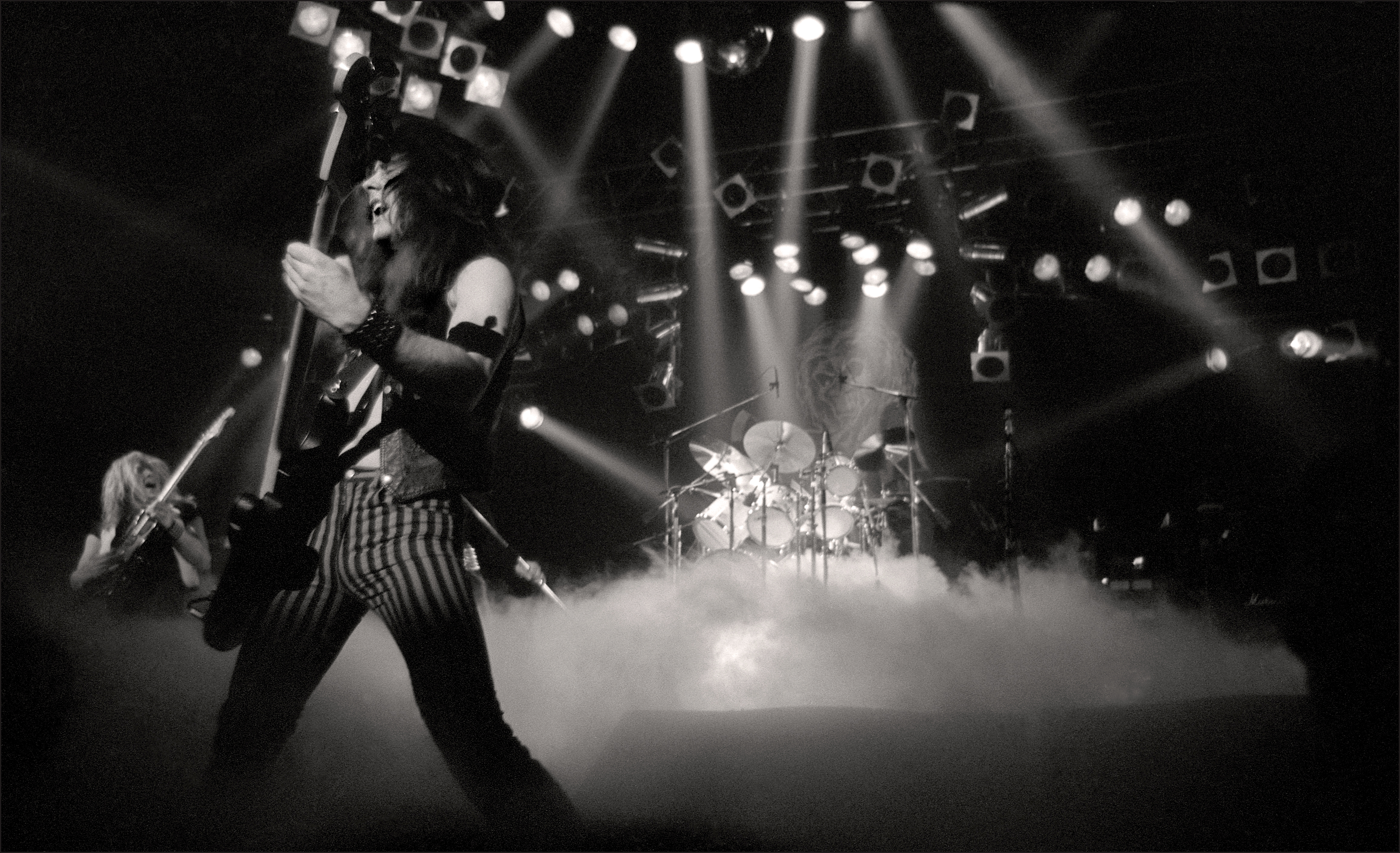
Iron Maiden on stage, Killer World Tour 1981

In 1981, Iron Maiden released their second studio album, Killers. Although many tracks were written prior to their debut release, it had two new songs: "Prodigal Son" and "Murders in the Rue Morgue" (the latter's title was taken from the short story by Edgar Allan Poe). Unsatisfied with the production on their debut album, the band hired veteran producer Martin Birch, who would continue to work with Iron Maiden until his retirement in 1992. The record was followed by the band's first world tour with their debut performance in the United States opening for Judas Priest at the Aladdin Theatre in Paradise, Nevada. Killers marked the band's USA album charts debut, reaching number 78 on the Billboard 200, and they booked 132 shows to promote the album, including their first concert in Belgrade, Yugoslavia. During the summer, Iron Maiden played several festivals in Europe, including at the Golden Summernights 1981 festivals at Zeppelinfeld in Nuremberg in front of 100,000 people.

=== Success (1981–1985) ===
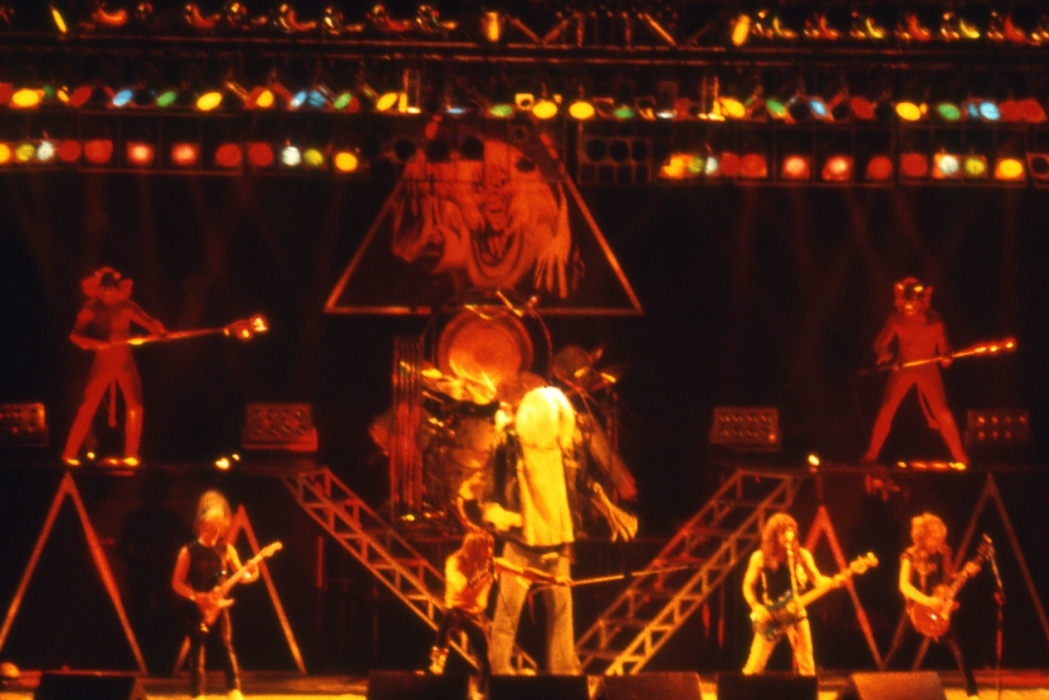
Stage set 1982

By 1981, Paul Di'Anno was demonstrating increasingly erratic behaviour, particularly due to his drug usage, about which Di'Anno comments, "It wasn't just that I was snorting a bit of coke, though; I was just going for it non-stop, 24 hours a day, every day ... the band had commitments piling up that went on for months, years, and I just couldn't see my way to the end of it. I knew I'd never last the whole tour. It was too much". Di'Anno was dismissed following the Killer World Tour with the band already having selected his replacement. After a meeting with Rod Smallwood at the Reading Festival, Bruce Dickinson, formerly of Samson, auditioned for Iron Maiden in September 1981 and was immediately hired. The following month, Dickinson went out on the road with the band on a small headlining tour in Italy and a one-off show at the Rainbow Theatre in the UK. For the last show, and in anticipation of their forthcoming album, the band played "Children of the Damned" and "22 Acacia Avenue", introducing fans to their new material.

In 1982, Iron Maiden released their third studio album, The Number of the Beast, which became the band's first number 1 record on the UK Albums Chart, was a Top 10 hit in many other countries, and reached number 33 on the Billboard 200. At the time, Dickinson was in the midst of legal difficulties with Samson's management and was not permitted to add his name to any of the songwriting credits, although he still made what he described as a "moral contribution" to "Children of the Damned", "The Prisoner", and "Run to the Hills". The band embarked on a world tour, dubbed The Beast on the Road, with shows in North America, Japan, Australia and Europe, including a headline appearance for 40,000 people at the Reading Festival. Iron Maiden played 188 shows in 10 months. The Beast on the Road's US leg proved controversial when an American conservative political lobbying group claimed Iron Maiden were Satanic because of the new album's title track and "demonic" cover art, and a group of Christian activists destroyed Iron Maiden records in protest. Dickinson later said the band treated this as "silliness" and the demonstrations in fact gave them "loads of publicity". The Number of the Beast sold 2.5 million copies in its first year, 14 million by 2010, and 20 million by 2022.

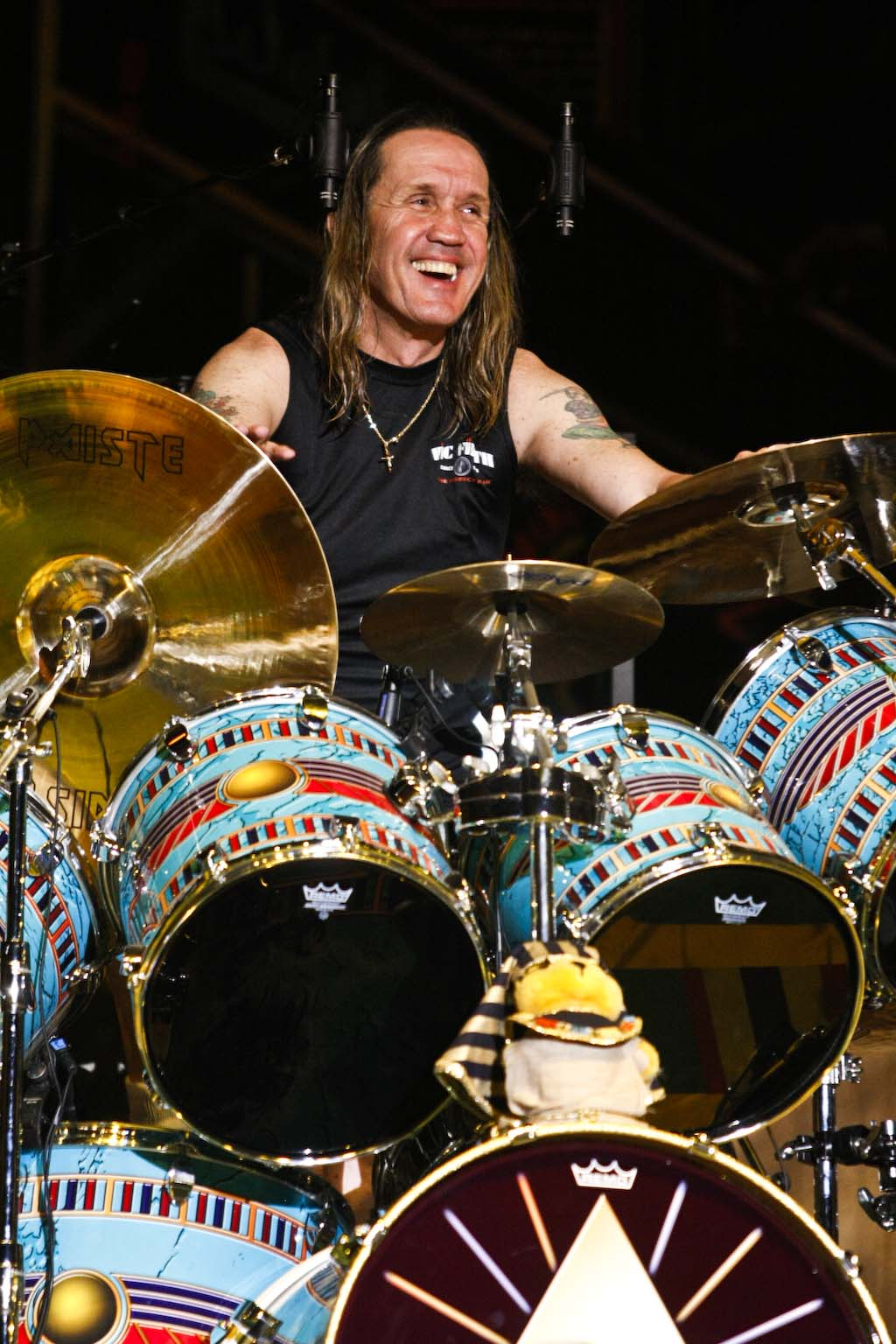
Nicko McBrain was Iron Maiden's drummer from 1982.

In December 1982, drummer Clive Burr was fired from the band and replaced by Nicko McBrain, who previously played for Trust. Although Harris said the dismissal took place because his live performances were affected by offstage activities, Burr later claimed he was unfairly ousted from the band. The band then recorded the first of three consecutive albums at Compass Point Studios in the Bahamas. In 1983, they released their fourth studio album, Piece of Mind, which reached the number 3 spot in the UK and number 14 on the Billboard 200. Piece of Mind features the singles "The Trooper" and "Flight of Icarus", the latter being one of the band's few songs to gain substantial airplay in the US. Iron Maiden played 147 concerts in Europe and North America as a part of the World Piece Tour. This was also their first major North American tour as headliners, selling out Madison Square Garden with a crowd of 20,000.

After the success of Piece of Mind and its supporting tour, the band released their fifth studio album, Powerslave, on 9 September 1984. The album features the singles "2 Minutes to Midnight" and "Aces High", the title track, and "Rime of the Ancient Mariner" (based on Samuel Taylor Coleridge's poem Rime of the Ancient Mariner). Powerslave was another chart success, reaching number 12 on the Billboard 200 and eventually number 1 in the UK. The band's fifth studio album sold over 4 million copies in its first year after the premiere. The tour following the album, called World Slavery Tour, was the band's largest to date with 193 shows in 28 countries over 13 months, playing to an estimated 3,500,000 people. Many shows were played back to back in the same city, such as in Long Beach, California, where the band played four consecutive concerts at Long Beach Arena for a combined audience of 54,000 fans. Iron Maiden also made their debut appearance in South America, where they co-headlined the Rock in Rio festival with Queen for an audience estimated at 350,000–500,000 people. The tour started in August 1984 with five shows in Poland. Iron Maiden were the first Western artists to bring full-scale production behind the Iron Curtain. The band's third official video, entitled Behind the Iron Curtain, was released in October 1984. The World Slavery Tour documentary brought footage of the band touring Eastern Europe in 1984, performing shows in the countries visited, Behind the Iron Curtain was the first documentary ever published by a Western artist that showed them touring the countries of Eastern Bloc. The documentary movie was broadcast by MTV and local TV stations around the world.

The tour was physically gruelling for the band, who demanded six months off when it ended (although this was later reduced to four months). This was the first substantial touring break in the group's history, including the cancellation of a proposed supporting tour for the new live album, with Bruce Dickinson threatening to quit unless the tour ended. In October 1985, Iron Maiden released the double live album and home video, Live After Death. A critical and commercial success, it peaked at number 19 on the Billboard 200 and number 2 in the UK. The album was recorded at Long Beach Arena and also features additional tracks from four nights at London's Hammersmith Apollo.

=== Experimentation (1986–1989) ===
Returning from their time off, the band added different musical elements to their 1986 studio album, Somewhere in Time. These focused on synthesised bass and guitars to add textures and layers to the sound. The release performed well across the world, particularly the single "Wasted Years", but included no writing credits from Dickinson, whose material was rejected by the rest of the band. The album was the band's biggest American chart success to date, reaching number 11 on the Billboard 200 and number 2 in the UK charts. The Somewhere on Tour was also a success. The band played 157 shows for over two and a half million fans, including eighty-one shows in North America. Once again, Iron Maiden visited Poland, Hungary and Yugoslavia to play for tens of thousands of fans in each country. The experimentation evident on Somewhere in Time continued on their next album, Seventh Son of a Seventh Son, which was released in 1988. A concept album recorded at Musicland Studios in Munich and based on the 1987 novel Seventh Son by Orson Scott Card, it was the band's first record to include keyboards, which were performed by Harris and Smith. Dickinson's enthusiasm was also renewed as his ideas were accepted for this album. Another popular release, it became Iron Maiden's third album to hit number 1 in the UK charts and reached number 12 on the Billboard 200.

On 8 May 1988, Iron Maiden played a show at the legendary heavy metal venue L'Amour in Brooklyn under the name "Charlotte and the Harlots". L'Amour was a regular hang-out for many band members and particularly Steve Harris, who knew DJ/Host/Booker Chuck Kaye.

During the following tour, the band headlined the Monsters of Rock festival at Donington Park on 20 August 1988, playing to the largest crowd in the festival's history (107,000). The tour concluded with several headline shows in the UK in November and December 1988, with the concerts at the NEC Arena, Birmingham, recorded for a live video, entitled Maiden England. The video debuted at top spots of worldwide music videos charts. In May, the group set out on a supporting tour, which saw them perform 103 shows to well over two million people worldwide over seven months. To recreate the album's keyboards onstage throughout the tour, the group recruited Michael Kenney, Steve Harris' bass technician; Kenney served as the band's live keyboard player until 2022, also performing on the band's four following albums.

=== Upheaval (1989–1994) ===
During a break in 1989, guitarist Adrian Smith released a solo album with his band ASAP, entitled Silver and Gold. Vocalist Bruce Dickinson also began work on a solo album with former Gillan guitarist Janick Gers, releasing Tattooed Millionaire in 1990, followed by a tour. At the same time, to mark the band's 10-year recording anniversary, Iron Maiden released a compilation collection, The First Ten Years, a series of 10 CDs and double 12-inch singles. Between 24 February and 28 April 1990, the individual parts were released one by one, each containing two of Iron Maiden's singles, including the original B-sides.

Iron Maiden then began work on a new studio record. During the pre-production stages, Adrian Smith left the band due to differences with Steve Harris regarding the direction the band should be taking. Smith disagreed with the "stripped down" style they were leaning towards and preferred to continue with the sound and writing that had brought them success with Seventh Son of a Seventh Son. Janick Gers, having worked on Dickinson's solo project, was chosen to replace Smith and became the band's first new member in seven years. The album No Prayer for the Dying was released in October 1990. It contained the hit singles "Holy Smoke" and "Bring Your Daughter... to the Slaughter", the band's first – and, to date, only – UK Singles Chart number 1, originally recorded by Dickinson's solo project for the soundtrack of A Nightmare on Elm Street 5: The Dream Child. Iron Maiden's eighth studio album debuted at number 2 on the UK albums chart and number 17 on the Billboard 200. No Prayer for the Dying was a return to their musical roots, especially in the simplicity of composition. In total, Iron Maiden played for some two million fans on the No Prayer on the Road tour.

After another break, the band recorded their next studio album, Fear of the Dark, which was released in 1992. The title track became a regular part of the band's concert setlists. Achieving their fourth number 1 on the UK albums chart and number 12 on the Billboard 200, the release also included the number 2 single "Be Quick or Be Dead", the number 21 single "From Here to Eternity", and the softer "Wasting Love". The album featured the first songwriting by Gers, and no collaboration between Harris and Dickinson on songs. The extensive worldwide tour that followed included their first-ever Latin American leg, although Christian organisations prevented Iron Maiden from performing in Chile and accused them of being "emissaries of satanic propaganda", and headlining the Monsters of Rock festivals in seven European countries. Iron Maiden's second performance at Donington Park, for a sold-out audience of 75,000, was filmed for the audio and video release Live at Donington and featured a guest appearance by Adrian Smith, who joined the band to perform "Running Free". The tour also saw conflicts between Bruce Dickinson and rest of the band.

In 1993, Dickinson left the band to pursue his solo career, but agreed to remain for a farewell tour and two live albums (later re-released in one package). The first, A Real Live One, was released in March 1993 and featured songs from 1986 to 1992, and the second, A Real Dead One, was released after Dickinson left the band and featured songs from 1980 to 1984. The tour did not go well, with Steve Harris claiming Dickinson would only perform properly for high-profile shows, and that at several concerts, he would only mumble into the microphone. Dickinson denied he was under-performing, saying it was impossible to "make like Mr. Happy Face if the vibe wasn't right", and that news of his exit from the band had prevented any chance of a good atmosphere during the tour. Dickinson played his farewell show with Iron Maiden on 28 August 1993. The show was filmed, broadcast by the BBC, MTV and released on video under the name Raising Hell.

=== Difficulties (1994–1999) ===
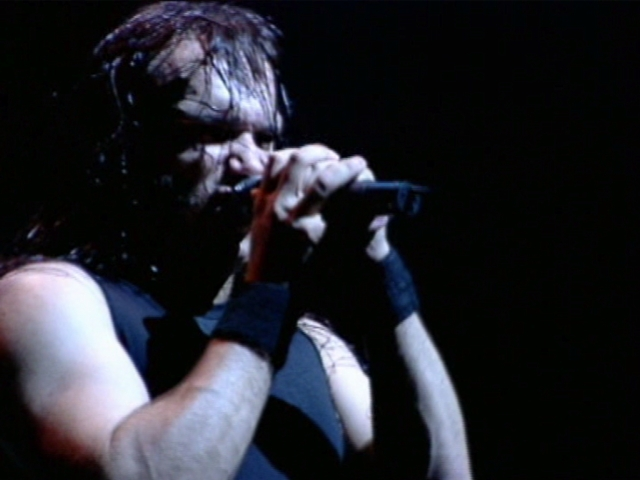
Blaze Bayley, Iron Maiden frontman from 1994 to 1999

In 1994, the title track from the Fear of the Dark album received a Grammy Awards nomination for "Best Metal Performance", a first for Iron Maiden. The band listened to the thousands of tapes sent in by vocalists before convincing Blaze Bayley, formerly of the band Wolfsbane, who had supported Iron Maiden in 1990, to audition for them. Harris' preferred choice from the outset, Bayley had a different vocal style from his predecessor and ultimately received a mixed reception among fans.

After a three-year hiatus – a record for the band at the time – Iron Maiden released their next studio album, The X Factor. The band had their lowest chart position since 1981 for an album in the UK, debuting at number 8; however, the album went on to win "Album of the Year" awards in France, Spain and Germany. The record included the 11-minute epic "Sign of the Cross", the band's longest song since "Rime of the Ancient Mariner", as well as the singles "Man on the Edge" (based on the film Falling Down) and "Lord of the Flies", based on the novel Lord of the Flies. The release is notable for its "dark" tone, inspired by Steve Harris' divorce. The band toured for the rest of 1995 and 1996, playing their first shows in Israel and South Africa as well as Malta, Bulgaria and Romania in Europe, before concluding in the Americas. The biggest show of the whole tour was a headline appearance for 60,000 people at the Monsters of Rock festival in São Paulo, Brazil. The X Factor sold 1.3 million copies, the lowest sales result since 1981. After the tour, Iron Maiden released a compilation album, Best of the Beast. The band's first compilation, it included a new single, "Virus", in which the lyrics attack critics who had recently written off the band.

In 1998, Iron Maiden released Virtual XI, whose chart scores were the band's lowest to date. The album peaked at number 16 in the UK, the band's lowest for a new studio record. At the same time, Steve Harris assisted in remastering the band's entire discography, up to and including Live at Donington. Bayley's tenure in Iron Maiden ended in January 1999 when he was asked to leave during a band meeting. The dismissal took place due to issues Bayley had experienced with his voice during the Virtual XI World Tour, although Janick Gers said this was partly the band's fault for forcing him to perform songs pitched outside the natural range of his voice.

=== Reunion and renewed success (1999–2005) ===
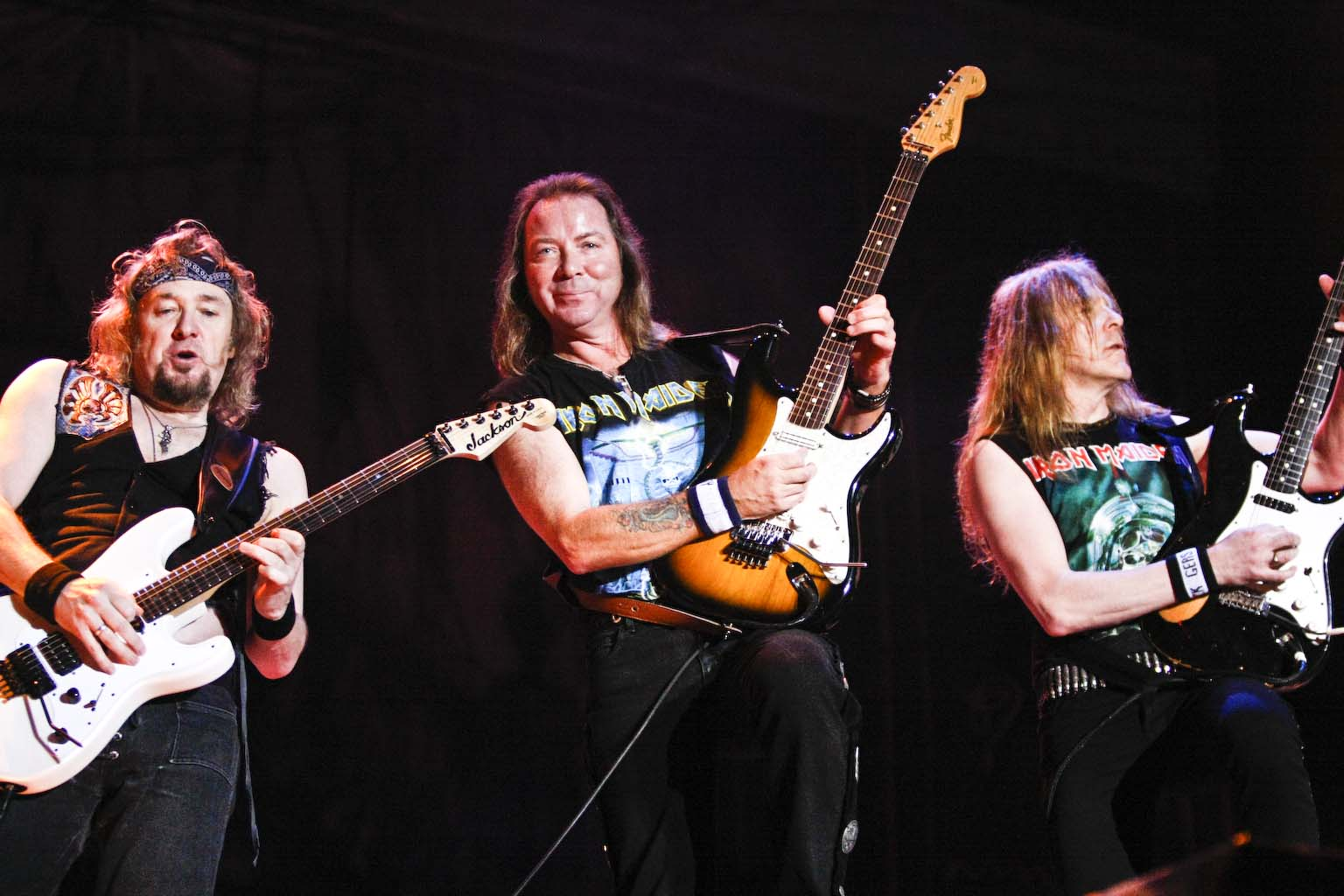
Adrian Smith (left) re-joined Iron Maiden in 1999, giving the band a three–guitar line-up.

The band entered into talks with Dickinson, who agreed to rejoin during a meeting in Brighton in January 1999, along with guitarist Adrian Smith, who was telephoned a few hours later. With Gers remaining, Iron Maiden now had a three-guitar line-up (nicknamed "The Three Amigos"), and embarked on a hugely successful reunion tour. Dubbed The Ed Hunter Tour, it tied in with the band's newly released greatest hits collection, Ed Hunter, whose track listing was decided by a poll on the group's website, and also contained a computer game starring Eddie, the band's mascot.

Not satisfied with the results from Harris' Barnyard Studios, located on his property in Essex, which had been used for the last four Iron Maiden studio albums, the band recorded the new release, Brave New World, at Guillaume Tell Studios in Paris, France in November 1999 with producer Kevin Shirley. Iron Maiden continued to find inspiration in movies and books, as shown in songs like "The Wicker Man" – based on the 1973 British cult film The Wicker Man – and "Brave New World" – a title taken from the Aldous Huxley novel Brave New World. The album revisited the more progressive and melodic sound featured in some earlier recordings, along with elaborate song structures and keyboard orchestration. The album was a commercial and artistic success.

The reunion world tour that followed had over 100 dates (including 31 shows of the 1999 tour), and culminated on 19 January 2001 in a show at the Rock in Rio festival in Brazil, where Iron Maiden played to an audience of over 250,000. While the performance was being produced for a CD and DVD release in March 2002, under the name Rock in Rio, the band took a year off from touring, although they played three consecutive shows at Brixton Academy to raise funds for former drummer Clive Burr, who had recently announced that he had been diagnosed with multiple sclerosis. The band performed two further concerts for Burr's MS Trust Fund charity in 2005, and 2007, before his death in 2013. During the 2000–2002 tour, Iron Maiden played 91 shows for over two million people in 33 countries. In addition to their touring success, the band was nominated twice for the annual Grammy Awards and received the International Achievement Award at the 2001 Ivor Novello Awards. In November 2001, a documentary movie about the making of The Number of the Beast album was produced by BBC as a part of the Classic Album series.

Following their summer 2003 Give Me Ed... 'Til I'm Dead Tour, with 57 shows in Europe and North America and headlining large festivals such as Roskilde, Heineken Jammin' Festival, Rock am Ring and Rock im Park (combined attendance of 130,000) and the first Download Festival held at Donington Park; a successor to Monsters of Rock, Iron Maiden released Dance of Death, their thirteenth studio album. It met with worldwide critical and commercial success, reaching number 2 on the UK Albums Chart and number 18 on the Billboard 200. Produced by Kevin Shirley, now the band's regular producer, many critics felt this release reached the standard of their earlier efforts. Historical and literary references were present, with "Montségur" focussing on the Cathar stronghold conquered in 1244, and "Paschendale" relating to the First World War battle.

During the Dance of Death Tour 2003–04, which began in September 2003, Iron Maiden played 53 shows across Europe, North America, Latin America and Japan. The band's performance at Westfalenhalle, in Dortmund, Germany, was recorded and released in August 2005 as a live album and DVD entitled Death on the Road. In 2005, the band announced the Eddie Rips Up the World Tour, which, tying in with their 2004 DVD entitled The History of Iron Maiden – Part 1: The Early Days, only featured material from their first four albums. As part of this celebration of their earlier years, "The Number of the Beast" single was re-released and went straight to number 3 on the UK Chart. The tour featured many headlining stadium and festival dates, including a performance at Ullevi Stadium in Sweden to an audience of almost 60,000. This concert was also broadcast live on satellite television across Europe to approximately 60 million viewers. The band completed the tour by headlining the Reading and Leeds Festivals on 26–28 August, and the RDS Stadium in Ireland on 31 August.

=== Continued success and expanded tours (2005–2014) ===
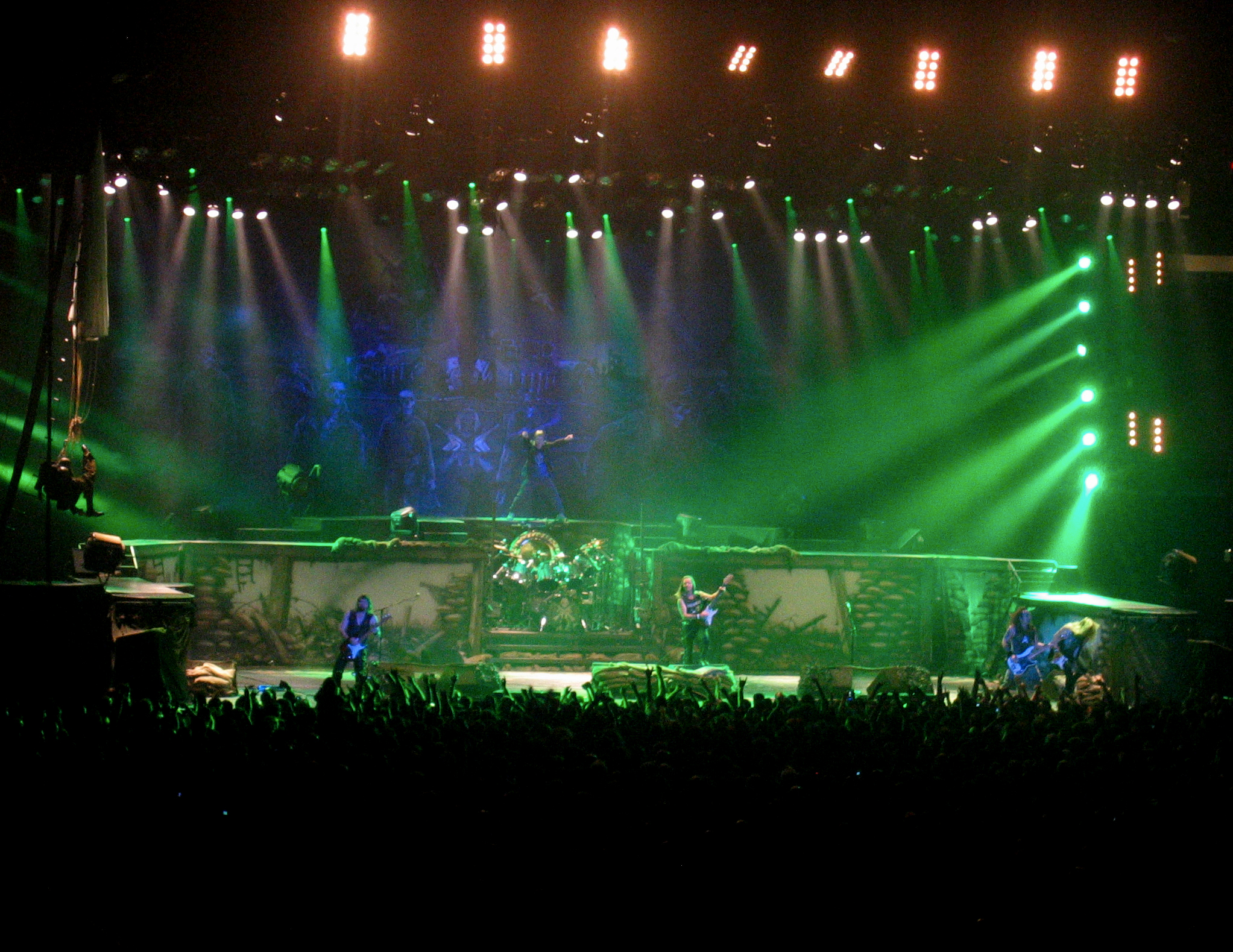
Iron Maiden militarian stage set presented on A Matter of Life and Death World Tour

At the end of 2005, Iron Maiden began work on A Matter of Life and Death, their fourteenth studio album, which was released in autumn 2006. War and religion are recurring themes in the lyrics and the cover artwork. The release was a critical and commercial success, marking the band's first top ten on the Billboard 200 and debuting at number one in the album charts of 13 countries. The supporting tour saw mixed critical reception, but included the band's first performance in Dubai at the Dubai Desert Rock Festival for 25,000 people, followed by a concert in Bangalore Palace Grounds, the first of any heavy metal band in India. The band then played a string of European dates, including an appearance at Download Festival, their fourth headline performance at Donington Park, to approximately 80,000 people.

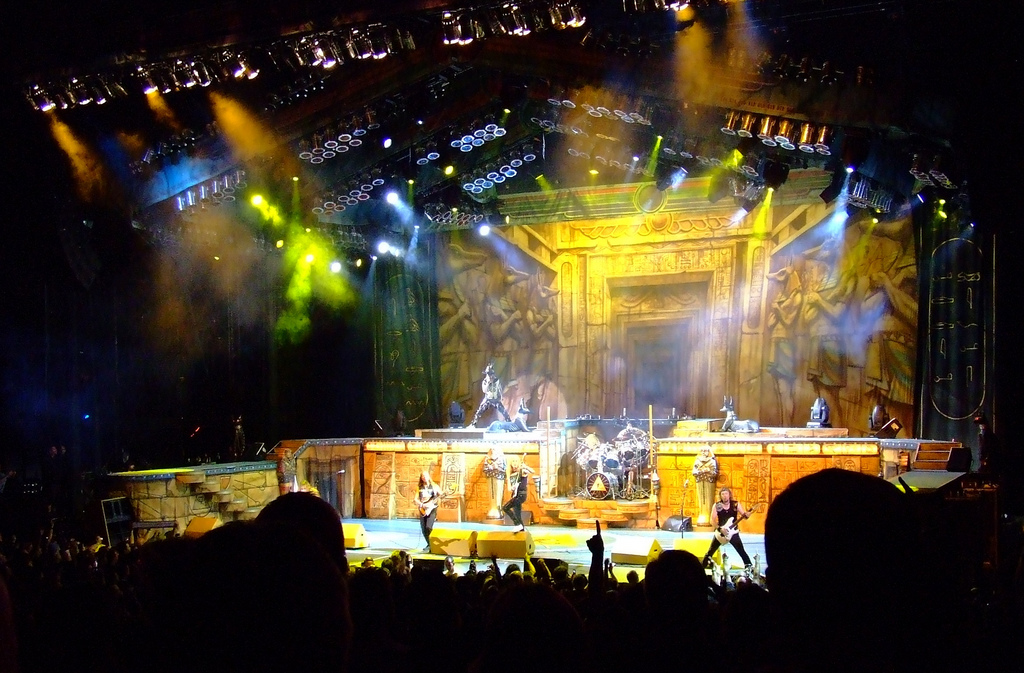
Somewhere Back in Time World Tour was one of the most important in Iron Maiden's career.

On 5 September 2007, the band announced their Somewhere Back in Time World Tour, tying in with the DVD release of their Live After Death album. The setlist for the tour consisted of songs from the 1980s. They played their first concerts in Costa Rica and Colombia and their first shows in Australia and Puerto Rico since 1992. The tour led to the release of a new compilation album, entitled Somewhere Back in Time, which included a selection of tracks from their 1980 eponymous debut to 1988's Seventh Son of a Seventh Son, as well as several live versions from Live After Death. In 2008–09 in Latin America the band played 27 concerts for about a million people in total, a record for a heavy rock performer. The tour continued with two legs in the US and Europe in the summer of 2008. The sole UK concert took place at Twickenham Stadium, marking the first time the band would headline a stadium in their own country. The 2008 tour was the second highest-grossing tour of the year for a British artist. The final leg included the band's first appearances in Peru and Ecuador, as well as their return to Venezuela and New Zealand after 17 years. The band also played another show in India at the Rock in India festival to a crowd of 20,000. At their concert in São Paulo on 15 March, Dickinson announced on stage that it was the largest non-festival show of their career, with an overall attendance of 100,000 people. The final leg ended in Florida on 2 April after which the band took a break. Overall, the tour reportedly had an attendance of over two and a half million people worldwide over both years. At the 2009 Brit Awards, Iron Maiden won the award for best British live act.

On 20 January 2009, the band announced they were planning to release a full-length documentary film in select cinemas on 21 April 2009. Entitled Iron Maiden: Flight 666, it documented the first part of the Somewhere Back in Time World Tour (between February and March 2008). Flight 666 was co-produced by Banger Productions and was distributed in cinemas by Arts Alliance Media and EMI, with D&E Entertainment sub-distributing in the US. The film went on to have a Blu-ray, DVD, and CD release in May and June, topping the music DVD charts in 25 countries. In most of them the release went Gold, Platinum or Multi-Platinum.

The band had begun composing new material and booked studio time in early 2010 with Kevin Shirley producing, and The Final Frontier was announced on 4 March and featured three singles "The Final Frontier", "El Dorado" and "Coming Home", as well as epic, progressive opuses "Isle of Avalon", "The Talisman" and "When The Wild Wind Blows". The album, the band's fifteenth, was released on 16 August to critical acclaim. It was also the band's greatest commercial success to that point, reaching number 1 in twenty-eight countries worldwide, including a debut at number 4 on Billboard 200.

The album's supporting tour saw the band perform 101 shows across the globe to an estimated audience of over two and a half million, including their first visits to Singapore, Indonesia, and South Korea. "El Dorado" won the Best Metal Performance award at the 2011 Grammy Awards, the band's first win after two previous nominations. On 15 March, a new compilation to accompany 2009's Somewhere Back in Time was announced. The double disc set covers the period 1990–2010 (the band's most recent eight studio albums). In 2012, the band announced a new live album and DVD release entitled En Vivo!, based on footage from the Chile concert. The DVD topped the music video charts around the world. In addition to the concert footage, the video release includes an 88-minute tour documentary, entitled Behind the Beast, containing interviews with the band and their crew. In December 2012, one song from the release ("Blood Brothers") was nominated for a Grammy Award for Best Hard Rock/Metal Performance at the 2013 Grammy Awards.

On 15 February, the band announced their third retrospective Maiden England World Tour 2012–14, which was based around the video Maiden England. The tour commenced in North America in the summer of 2012 and was followed by further dates in 2013 and 2014, and included the band's fifth headline performance at Donington Park with 100,000 fans in attendance. Iron Maiden closed the tour in July 2014 at Sonisphere Festival, Knebworth, having undertaken 100 shows in 32 countries before an estimated audience of more than 2.7 million people.

=== Latest albums and tours (2015–present) ===
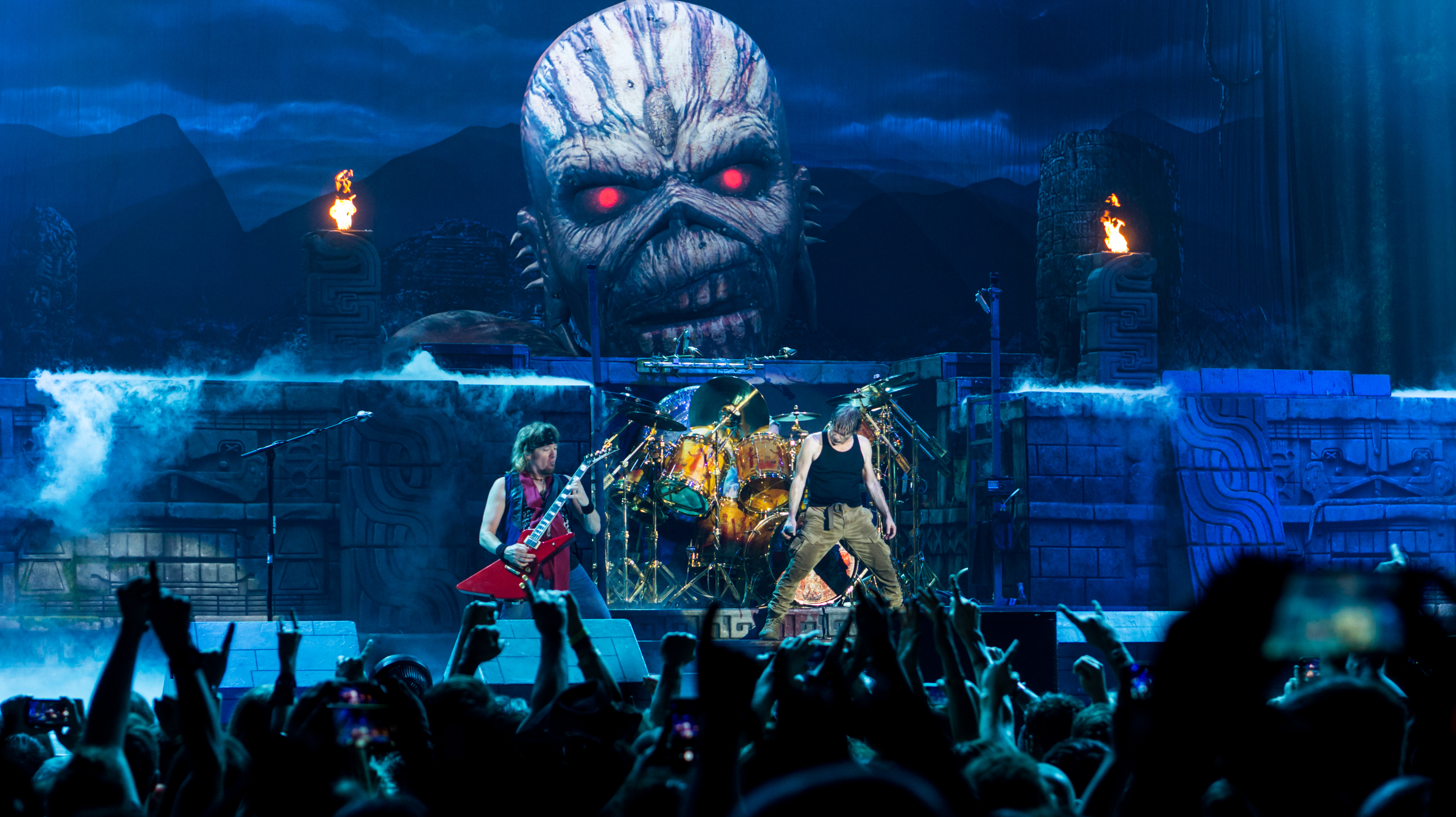
Smith and Dickinson on stage at London's O_{2} Arena in May 2017

The band's 2015 album, The Book of Souls, was released on 4 September. The band's first original studio album not to be issued by EMI outside North America, following Parlophone's acquisition by Warner Music Group in 2013, it was a icritical and commercial success, becoming the band's fifth UK number 1 album and hit number 4 on Billboard 200 in the US. The new release reached the number one position in the album charts of 43 countries. The new record was recorded at Guillaume Tell Studios in late summer 2014; its closing song, "Empire of the Clouds", penned by Dickinson, surpassed "Rime of the Ancient Mariner" (from 1984's Powerslave) as Iron Maiden's longest song, at 18 minutes in length.

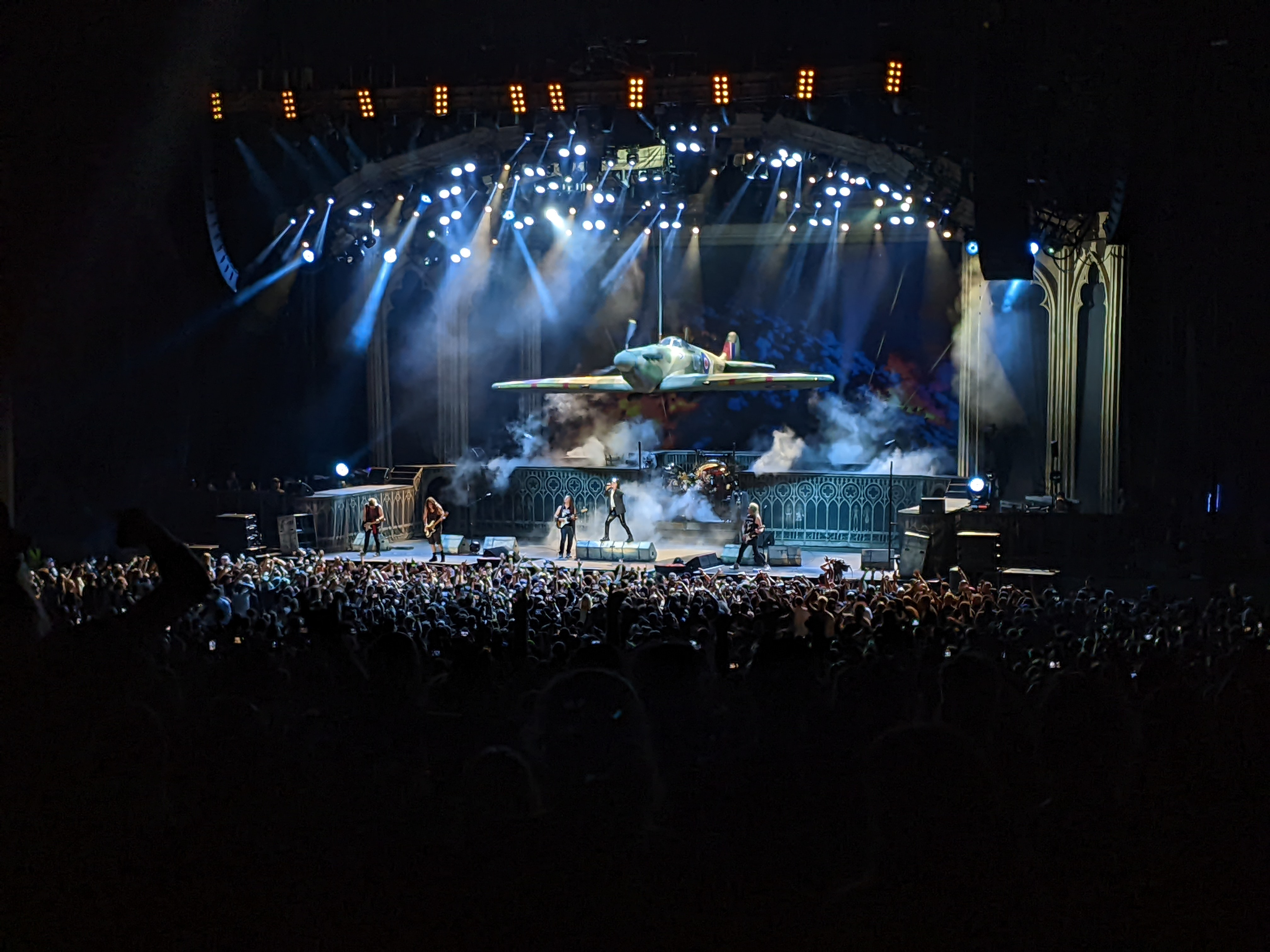
Iron Maiden in Chula Vista, 2022

In February 2016, the band embarked on The Book of Souls World Tour, with shows in 35 countries across six continents, including their first performances in China, El Salvador, and Lithuania. It was the band's biggest album tour since 1996. In total, Iron Maiden played 117 shows on six continents for well over two and a half million people. The band then launched the Legacy of the Beast World Tour in Europe in 2018, with North and South American shows following in 2019. The tour was inspired by the band's new mobile game and comic series released in 2017, entitled Legacy of the Beast. The tour was received very positively by fans and critics, spanning up to three years with 140 shows, performing to over 3.5 million fans. The COVID-19 pandemic forced the rescheduling of nearly one million tickets from 2020, first to 2021, and then to 2022. A live double album from the Legacy of the Beast World Tour called Nights of the Dead was recorded during three sold-out concerts in Mexico City's Palacio de los Deportes for a combined audience of over 70,000 people.

On 19 July 2021, the band announced that their seventeenth studio album, Senjutsu, would be released on 3 September 2021. Senjutsu eventually reached the top of the best-seller lists in 27 countries, but it was the band's first album in fifteen years not to reach number one on the UK charts, although it did top the UK Rock & Metal Singles and Albums Charts. In total, Senjutsu reached the top three in 55 countries and the top five in 63 countries. In September, the band and Kiss were inducted legacy members into The Metal Hall of Fame alongside Triumph, Stryper, guitarist Marty Friedman, and photographer Mark Weiss.

The band started their 25th global tour, The Future Past World Tour, with a concert in Ljubljana in May 2023. Throughout the 2023–24 world tour, Iron Maiden performed 81 shows for almost two million fans. Following the conclusion of the tour in São Paulo in December 2024, McBrain retired from touring, but remained a member of Iron Maiden who would be involved with studio projects. British Lion drummer Simon Dawson was announced as his touring replacement.

The band began its 26th global tour, Run for Your Lives World Tour, in May 2025, to celebrate the band's 50th anniversary and is focused on the band's first nine studio albums. Over a million tickets were sold for the first thirty-two shows for the European leg in 2025, which was later extended in 2026. After an EddFest festival on 11 July 2026, a celebration of the band's 50th anniversary, and the South American shows later in the year, the band were originally set to take a break from touring until at least 2028, but then changed their minds and added additional North American shows on the Run for Your Lives tour for 2027.

On 14 July 2026, the band announced a partnership with Pophouse Entertainment, covering the resale of copyright stakes in the music catalog, reissues, merchandising, image, logo, and Eddie's character. The agreement includes a theatrical concert film, a museum, and advanced digitalization of the group's image. On 14 November 2026, the band, who were unable to attend due to touring commitments, were inducted into the Rock and Roll Hall of Fame, which took place at the Peacock Theater in Los Angeles, and was broadcast on ABC and Disney+.

== Image and legacy ==
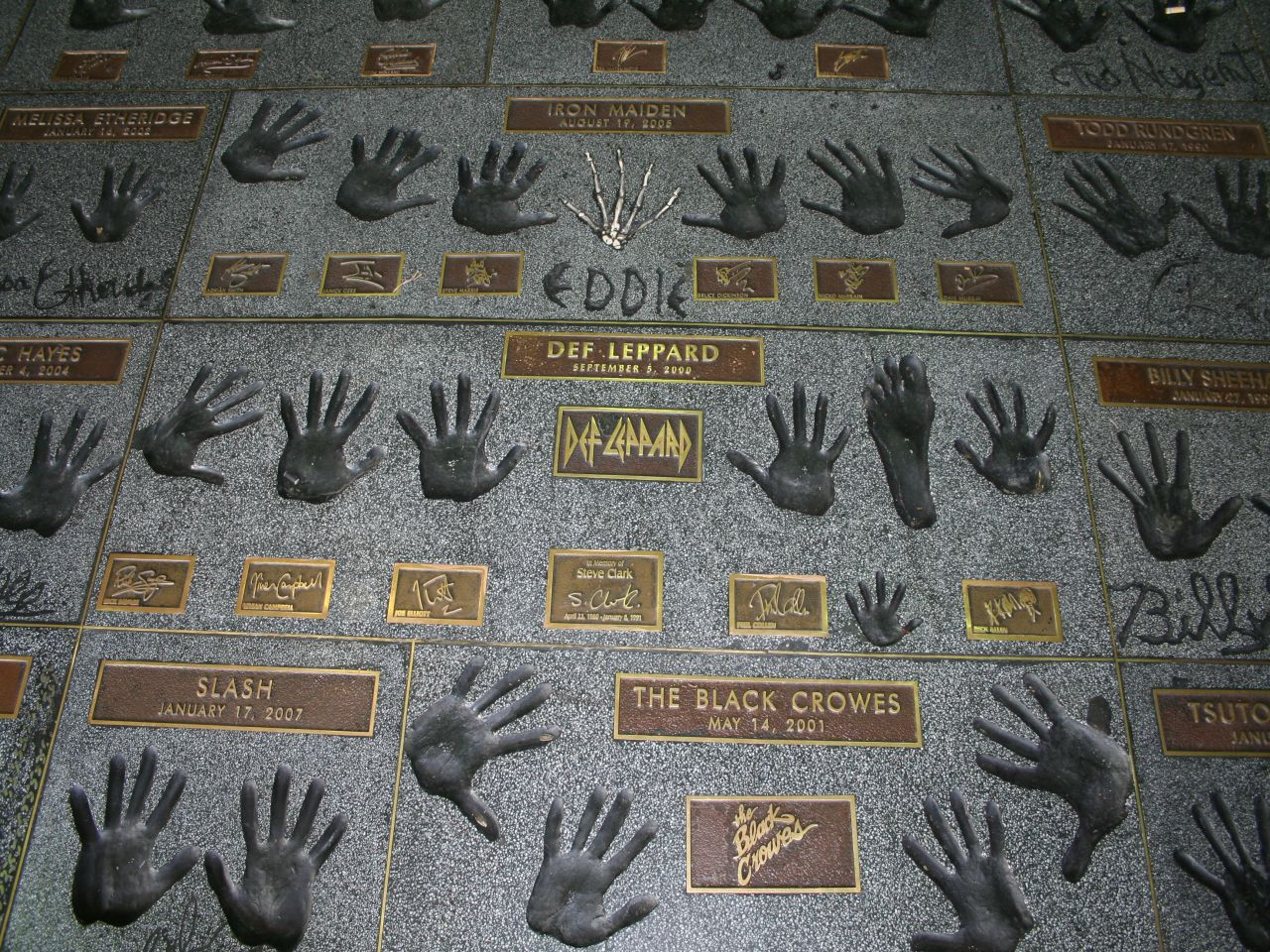
Hollywood's RockWalk (Iron Maiden and Eddie are featured at the top of the picture, above Def Leppard)

Iron Maiden have received numerous nominations, honours and awards including Grammy Awards and equivalents awards in many countries, Brit Awards, Ivor Novello Awards, and Juno Awards. They have ranked highly in many polls of the greatest metal artists of all time. In 2012 The Number of the Beast was voted as Best British Album Ever by the British public as part of Elizabeth II's Diamond Jubilee celebrations. In 2016, the staff of Loudwire named them the second-best metal band of all time.

Iron Maiden were inducted into Hollywood RockWalk, BPI Hall of Fame and Kerrang! Hall of Fame in 2005. Band's mascot Eddie the Head is a part of the British Music Experience permanent exhibition. In April 2021, the band's former members (Paul Di'Anno, Blaze Bayley, and illustrator Derek Riggs) were inducted into the Metal Hall of Fame. In 2016 Iron Maiden were given the titles of Honorary Visitors of the Country Award in El Salvador, and in 2019 they were honored as Visitors Of The Nation and Chamber of Deputies of Argentina, the first time the honor was given to an international artist. In January 2023 Iron Maiden were honoured by Royal Mail with dedicated postal stamps and cards. The band were honoured with an official Royal Mint coin commemorating their 50th anniversary in July 2025, joining The Royal Mint's Music Legends series. In June 2026, the band's manager, Rod Smallwood, received the "Order of the British Empire" (OBE). This recognition completed the band's 50th Anniversary celebrations.

Iron Maiden received three nominations for the Rock and Roll Hall of Fame in the 2020s: the first in early 2021, the second in February 2023, and the third in May 2026. The band was inducted on 13 April 2026, but will not attend the ceremony due to scheduling conflicts. All current recording members of the band will be inducted along with four former members including vocalists Paul Di'Anno, Blaze Bayley, drummer Clive Burr and guitarist Dennis Stratton. According to data published in the magazine Pollstar in 2025, Iron Maiden concerts had generated more than $1 billion in revenue since 1982. Iron Maiden was also the fifth-highest earning artist based on concert ticket sales between November 2024 and October 2025, with a revenue of $128 million and 1.32 million net ticket sales over 41 concerts.

Iron Maiden have sold over 130 million copies of their albums worldwide, despite little radio or television support. According to many sources all audio-visual catalogue of the band have sold in over 200 million copies worldwide, including regular albums, singles, compilations, and videos. Their third studio album, The Number of the Beast, is among the most popular heavy metal albums of all time and the most commercially successful release of the band, having sold almost 20 million copies worldwide. As of 2022 their releases have been certified silver, gold and platinum around 600 times worldwide.

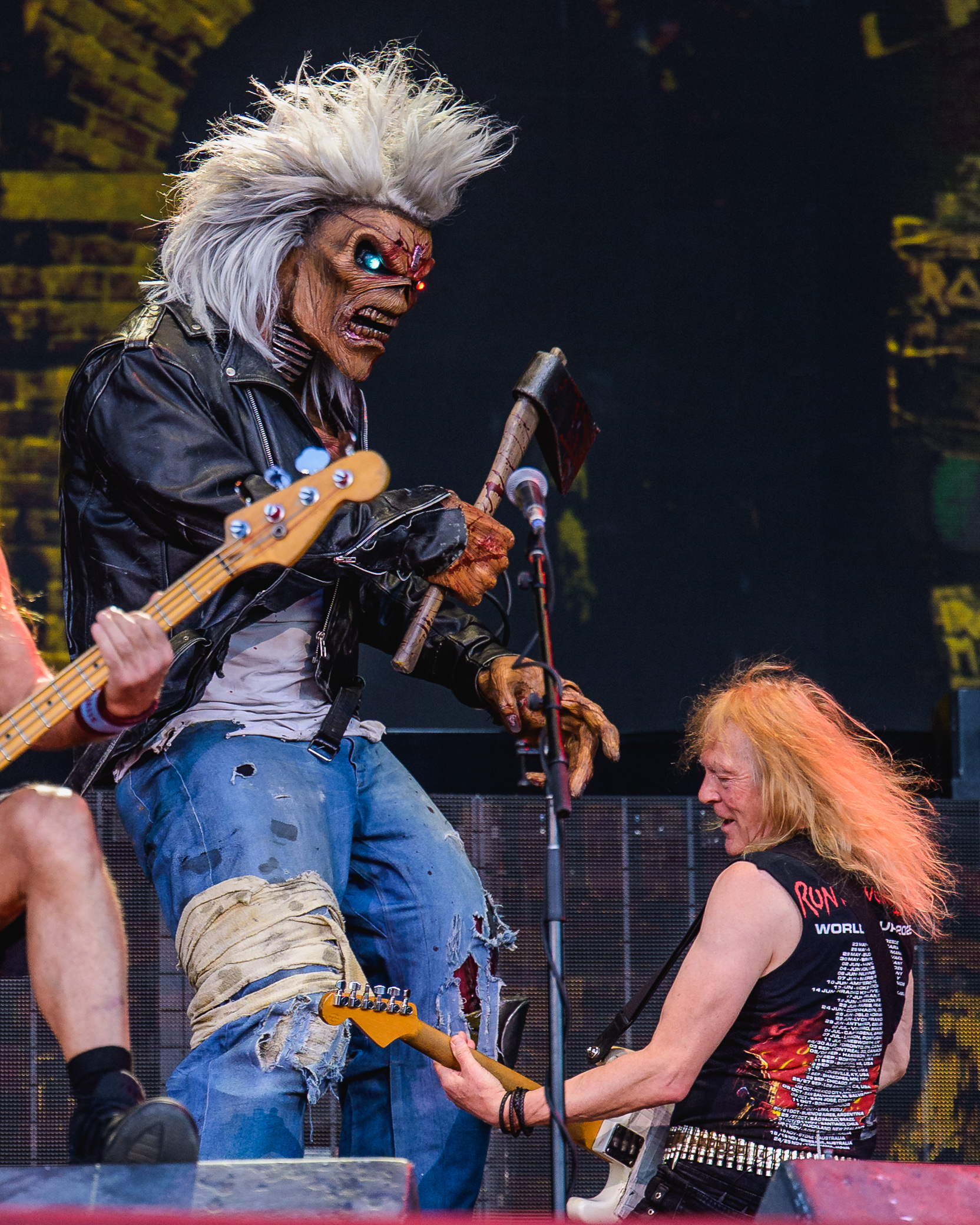
Iron Maiden's mascot Eddie "attacking" Janick Gers during a performance at Tons of Rock in Oslo, June 2026

In 1979–1980, visual artist Derek Riggs created the macabre mascot named Eddie The Head. Since then, Eddie has been an integral part of the stage and media image of the group. Originally a papier-mâché mask which would squirt fake blood during their live shows, the character featured on the band's debut album cover, also done by Derek Riggs. Eddie was painted exclusively by Riggs until 1992, at which point the band began using artwork from other artists, including Melvyn Grant. A large puppet version of Eddie has appeared many times during carnival celebrations in Rio de Janeiro and other South American cities. During the Cavalcade of Magi 2021 in the Spanish city of Cadiz, next to dolls representing characters known from the world of pop culture, there was a huge, inflatable mummy inspired by the image of the Iron Maiden mascot from 1985.

Iron Maiden's distinct logo has adorned all of the band's releases since their debut, 1979's The Soundhouse Tapes EP. The typeface originates with Vic Fair's poster design for the 1976 science fiction film, The Man Who Fell to Earth, also used by Gordon Giltrap, although Steve Harris claims he designed it himself, using his training as an architectural draughtsman.

The niece of Clive Burr, Rayne Leat, is a professional wrestler and wrestles with a metalhead gimmick under the moniker "The Maiden of Metal", in reference to Burr and Iron Maiden. Leat also revealed that the jacket she wears to the ring belonged to Burr.

=== Influence on other artists and the genre ===
Iron Maiden have influenced numerous artists and bands representing different genres of rock and metal music. Kiss co-founder Paul Stanley said Iron Maiden "have helped spawn an entire genre of music" and influenced literally thousands of other artists. According to Guitar World, Iron Maiden's music has "influenced generations of newer metal acts, from legends like Metallica to current stars like Avenged Sevenfold." Metallica members Lars Ulrich, Kirk Hammett, and Jason Newsted have cited Iron Maiden as a major influence on their work. Other bands and artists directly influenced by Iron Maiden include Ghost, Avenged Sevenfold, In Flames, Anthrax, Exodus, Alice in Chains, Megadeth, Testament, Helloween, Dream Theater, Blind Guardian, Slipknot, Disturbed, Opeth, Sabaton, Emperor, Cradle of Filth, Sikth, Pantera, Darkest Hour, Killswitch Engage, Fozzy, All That Remains, Parkway Drive, Gamma Ray, Powerwolf, Volbeat, and My Chemical Romance.

Journalist Geoff Barton says the band's music constituted an important passage between the classic heavy rock school during the 1960s and 1970s, based on rhythm and blues, and contemporary heavy metal, characterised by sub-genre diversification and stylistic eclecticism. Music journalist Götz Kühnemund said "Iron Maiden were (and still are) the inspiration for all the heavy metal bands we know today because they're an intrinsically heavy metal group. They're equally important for those who play power metal, speed, thrash, death, black, nu metal, metal core and hard rock – almost every genre." The journalist stated the band introduced a DIY approach to all rock music. According to Rock 'n Roll Fantasy Camp the style and attitude of Iron Maiden drummer Nicko McBrain has inspired generations of heavy-metal drummers that followed. Music writer, heavy metal expert and radio broadcaster Scott Penfold stated band's "influence on the genre is immeasurable, as they not only inspired subsequent generations of metal bands but also revolutionised live shows with their elaborate stage productions, further cementing their status as pioneers of heavy metal." Quentin Thane Singer of Forbes, claimed that "Dave Murray’s and Adrian Smith’s dueling guitar harmonies, galloping riffs and epic guitar solos have influenced nearly every significant band to come out of the metal genre since the mid ‘80s."

Music journalist and the writer Neil Daniels said Iron Maiden "redefined the whole genre blending classic heavy rock influence with punky vibe, twin guitars attack and progressive approach which finally have created the new quality. [The] Band's influence on generations of rock and metal bands cannot be overstated. They elevated metal to an art form, proving that academic and musical inspirations can coexist." The band's profile by the Rock and Roll Hall of Fame says "in the 1980s, Iron Maiden released seven high-octane albums that cemented them as one of the greatest rock bands – creating a blueprint for how heavy metal bands should look, sound and tour." According to Metal Hammer Iron Maiden is the second band to Black Sabbath, which has had the most significant impact on metal and heavy rock music.

=== Appearance in media ===
The first heavy metal videos broadcast by MTV were the live versions of "Iron Maiden" and "Wrathchild" taken from the official VHS Live at the Rainbow. In 1989, Iron Maiden took part in the Rock Aid Armenia project (also known as Live Aid Armenia) - a humanitarian project by the British music industry. The project aimed to raise funds to help people affected by the earthquake in Armenia in 1988.

The number of releases in tribute to the British band can be estimated in the hundreds, with an extremely wide range of stylistic variants. In 2008, Kerrang! released Maiden Heaven: A Tribute to Iron Maiden, an album composed of Iron Maiden cover songs performed by Metallica, Machine Head, Dream Theater, Trivium, Coheed and Cambria, Avenged Sevenfold, and other groups influenced by the band. In 2010, Maiden uniteD, an acoustic tribute band consisting of members of Ayreon, Threshold and Within Temptation, released Mind the Acoustic Pieces, a re-interpretation of the entire Piece of Mind album. As of 2021 nearly 200 Iron Maiden cover audio-visual releases exist (each featuring various artists), including piano, electro, string quartet and hip-hop tributes.

On 14 March 2025, the band announced Iron Maiden: Burning Ambition, a feature documentary film created in cooperation with Universal Pictures. Released in cinemas worldwide in May 2026, the documentary was directed by Malcolm Venville and produced by Dominic Freeman. Burning Ambition features humorous testimonies from famous Maiden superfans, including Javier Bardem, Lars Ulrich and Gene Simmons. Helen Parker, known as EVP Universal Pictures Content Group, was chosen as executive producer. According to Thames & Hudson, the visual book entitled "Iron Maiden: Infinite Dreams – The Official Visual History" will be published in the same period accompanying the movie.

=== Claims of Satanic references ===
The 1982 release of The Number of the Beast created some controversy for the band. The artwork and title track led to Christian groups in the United States branding the band as Satanists, encouraging people to destroy copies of the release. The band's manager, Rod Smallwood, later said the groups initially burnt the records, but later decided to destroy them with hammers due to fear of breathing in the melting vinyl's fumes. The protests were not restricted to the US, with Christian organisations preventing Iron Maiden from performing in Chile in 1992.

The band have always denied the notion they are Satanists, with lead vocalist Bruce Dickinson doing so on-stage in the Live After Death concert video. Steve Harris has since commented that "It was mad. They completely got the wrong end of the stick. They obviously hadn't read the lyrics. They just wanted to believe all that rubbish about us being Satanists." Harris has also said that "The Number of the Beast" song was inspired by a nightmare he had after watching Damien: Omen II, and also influenced by Robert Burns' "Tam o' Shanter". The band's drummer, Nicko McBrain, has been a born-again Christian since 1999.

=== Ed Force One ===
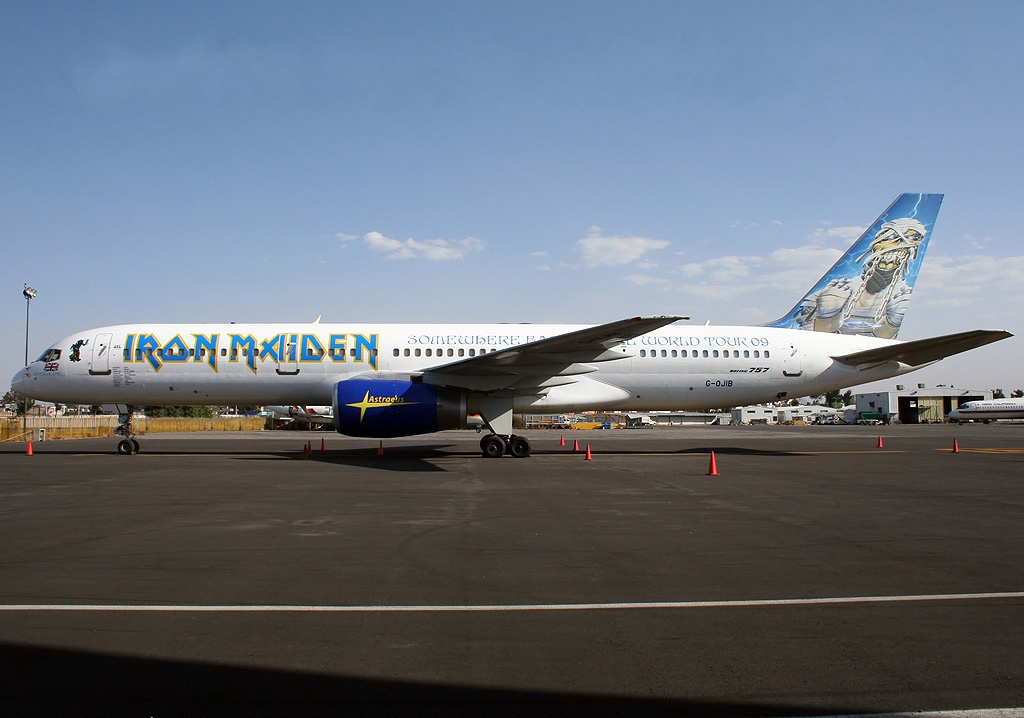
The band's former Ed Force One, a Boeing 757-200

For their Somewhere Back in Time World Tour in 2008 and 2009, Iron Maiden commissioned an Astraeus Airlines Boeing 757 as transport. The aeroplane was converted into a combi configuration, which enabled it to carry the band, their crew and stage production, allowing the group to perform in countries which were previously deemed unreachable logistically. It was also repainted with a special Iron Maiden livery, which the airline decided to retain after receiving positive feedback from customers.

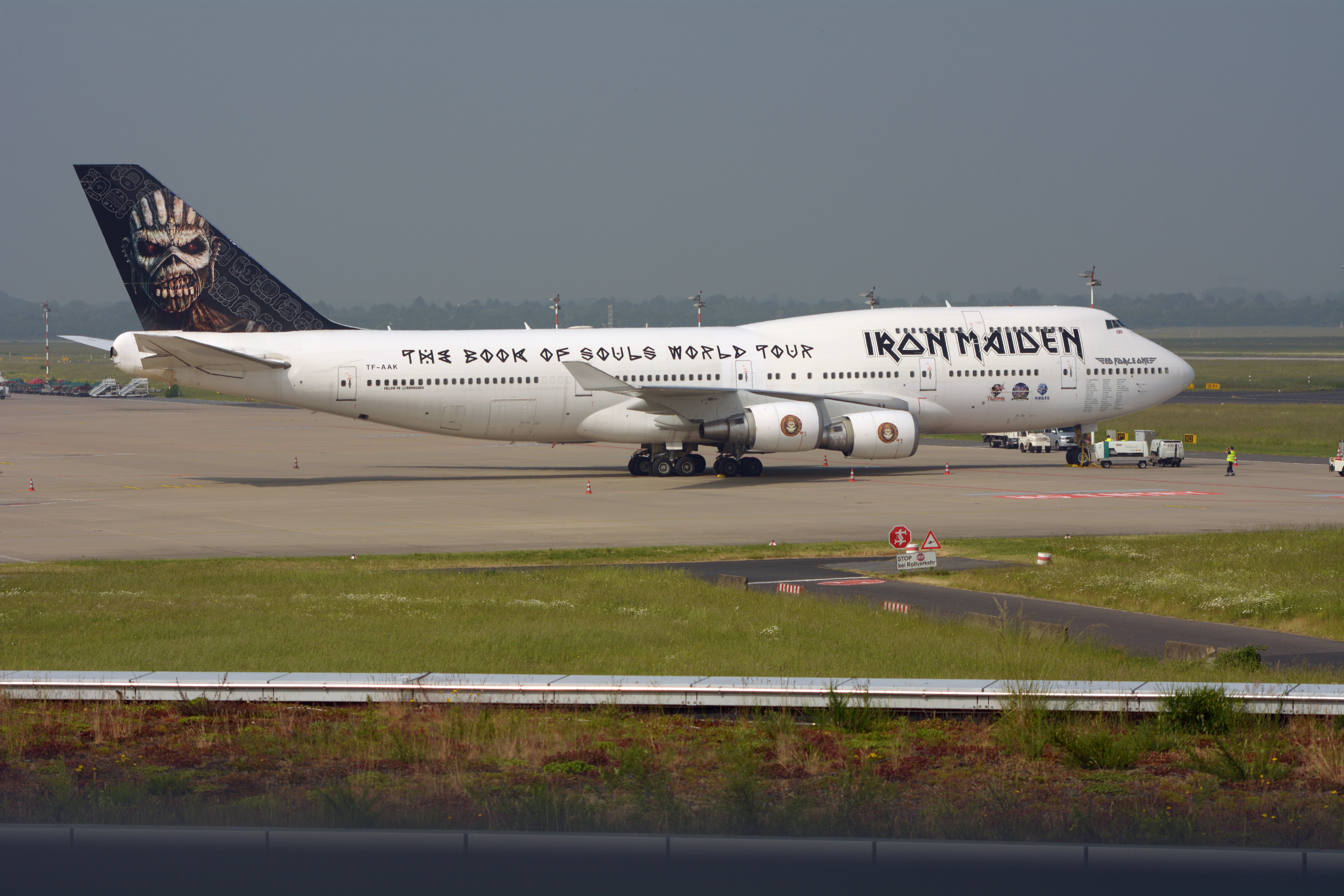
Iron Maiden's Ed Force One, a Boeing 747-400, as used during The Book of Souls World Tour in 2016

The aircraft, named "Ed Force One" after a competition on the band's website, was flown by Dickinson until 2022, as he was also a commercial airline pilot for Astraeus; the plane also appears in the documentary Iron Maiden: Flight 666. For The Book of Souls World Tour in 2016, the band upgraded to an ex-Air France Boeing 747-400 jumbo jet which allows for more space without the aircraft having to undergo a significant conversion to carry their equipment.

In 2025, the band announced that the 747-400 they used during 2016's The Book of Souls World Tour would be scrapped, and keychains constructed from the plane's parts could be collected by fans. "She's been scrapped but bits of her will live on," Dickinson said. The keychains were sold for €66.66, which is a reference to the band's album The Number of the Beast.

== Musical style and influences ==
"Run to the Hills" (1982)
"Run to the Hills" (The Number of the Beast) demonstrates the band's trademark "gallop" riff style.

"Caught Somewhere in Time" (1986)
"Caught Somewhere in Time" (Somewhere in Time). The band's use of harmonised guitars and usage of "gallop" rhythm remains unchanged as synthesisers are added.

"Brave New World" (2000)
"Brave New World" (Brave New World) demonstrates the band's increased use of progressive elements in the latter half of their career.

Steve Harris, Iron Maiden's bassist and primary songwriter, has said his influences include Black Sabbath, Deep Purple, Led Zeppelin, Uriah Heep, Pink Floyd, Genesis, Yes, Jethro Tull, Thin Lizzy, UFO, Queen, Wishbone Ash and Golden Earring. Iron Maiden covered a song by Golden Earring called "Kill Me Ce Soir" on the B-side of the single "Holy Smoke". In 2010 Harris said, "I think if anyone wants to understand Maiden's early thing, in particular the harmony guitars, all they have to do is listen to Wishbone Ash's Argus album. Thin Lizzy too, but not as much. And then we wanted to have a bit of a prog thing thrown in as well, because I was really into bands like Genesis and Jethro Tull. So you combine all that with the heavy riffs and the speed, and you've got it." In 2004, Harris explained the band's "heaviness" was inspired by "Black Sabbath and Deep Purple with a bit of Zeppelin thrown in." Harris also developed his own playing style, which guitarist Janick Gers describes as "more like a rhythm guitar." Harris's bass technique is responsible for the band's galloping style, heard in such songs as "The Trooper" and "Run to the Hills".

The band's guitarists, Dave Murray, Adrian Smith, and Janick Gers, each have their own individual influences and playing styles. Dave Murray is known for his legato technique which, he says, "evolved naturally. I'd heard Jimi Hendrix using legato when I was growing up, and I liked that style of playing." Stating that he "was inspired by blues rock rather than metal," Adrian Smith was influenced by Johnny Winter and Pat Travers, leading to him becoming a "melodic player." Janick Gers prefers a more improvised style, largely inspired by Ritchie Blackmore, which he says is in contrast to Smith's "rhythmic" sound.

Singer Bruce Dickinson, who typically works in collaboration with guitarist Adrian Smith, has an operatic vocal style, inspired by Arthur Brown, Peter Hammill, Ian Anderson and Ian Gillan, and is often considered to be one of the best heavy metal vocalists of all time. Although Nicko McBrain has only received one writing credit, on the Dance of Death album, Harris often relies on him while developing songs. Adrian Smith commented, "Steve loves playing with him. [They] used to work for hours going over these bass and drum patterns."

Throughout their career, the band's style has remained largely unchanged, although the addition of guitar synthesisers on 1986's Somewhere in Time, keyboards on 1988's Seventh Son of a Seventh Son, and an attempt to return to the "stripped down" production of their earlier material on 1990's No Prayer for the Dying marked some experimentation. In recent years, however, the band have begun using more progressive elements in their songs, which Steve Harris describes as not progressive "in the modern sense, but like Dream Theater, more in a 70s way". Greg Prato of Ultimate-Guitar wrote, "By and large, Iron Maiden's long and lengthy career can be categorised into two separate eras: "punk Maiden" and "prog Maiden". According to Harris, Seventh Son of a Seventh Son was the band's first album which was "more progressive", and they would return to this style in 1995's The X Factor, which he states is "like an extension of Seventh Son..., in the sense of the progressive element to it". The development contrasts with the band's raw-sounding earlier material, which AllMusic states was "clearly drawing from elements of punk rock", although Harris firmly denies this.

== Band members ==
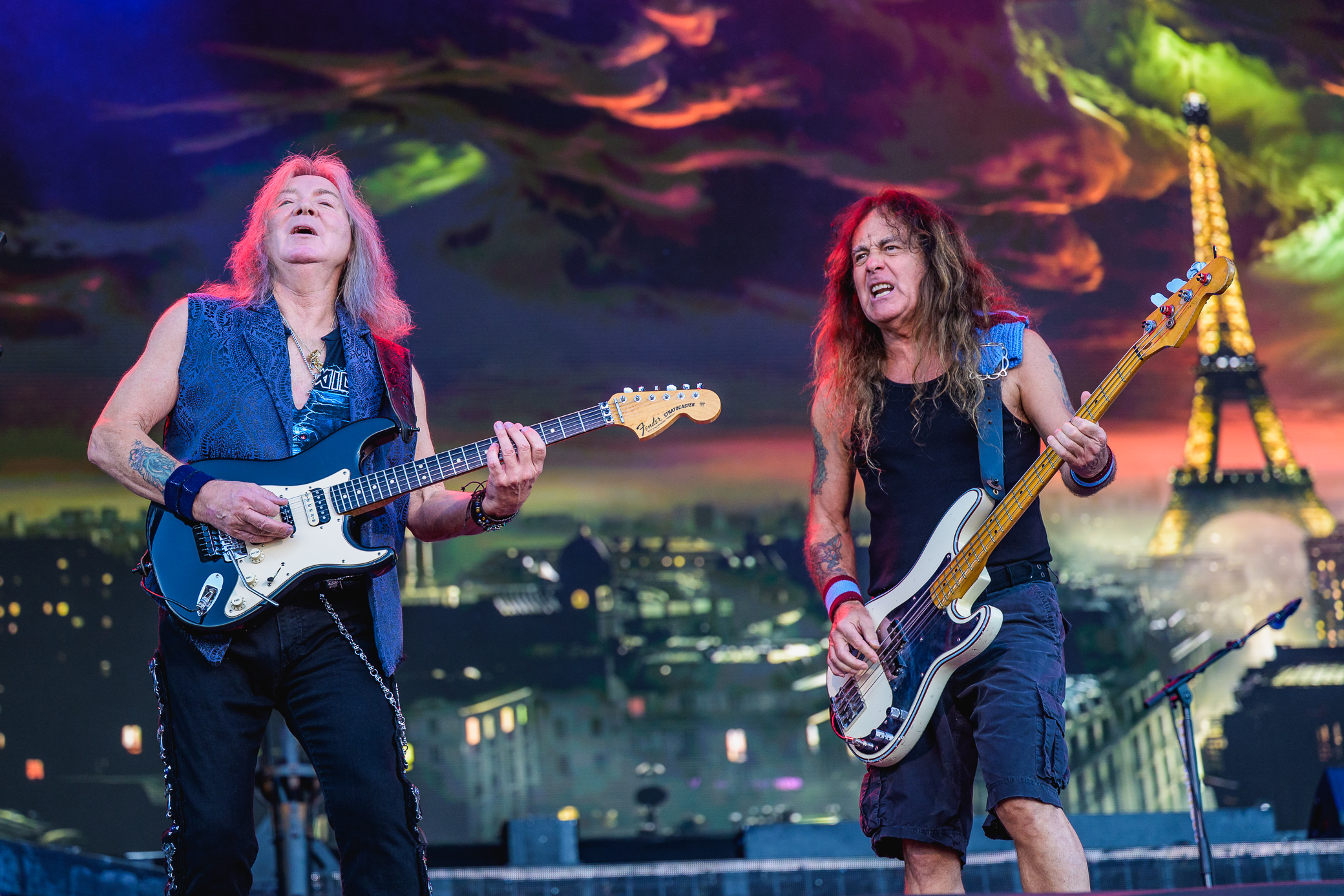
Guitarist Dave Murray and bassist Steve Harris

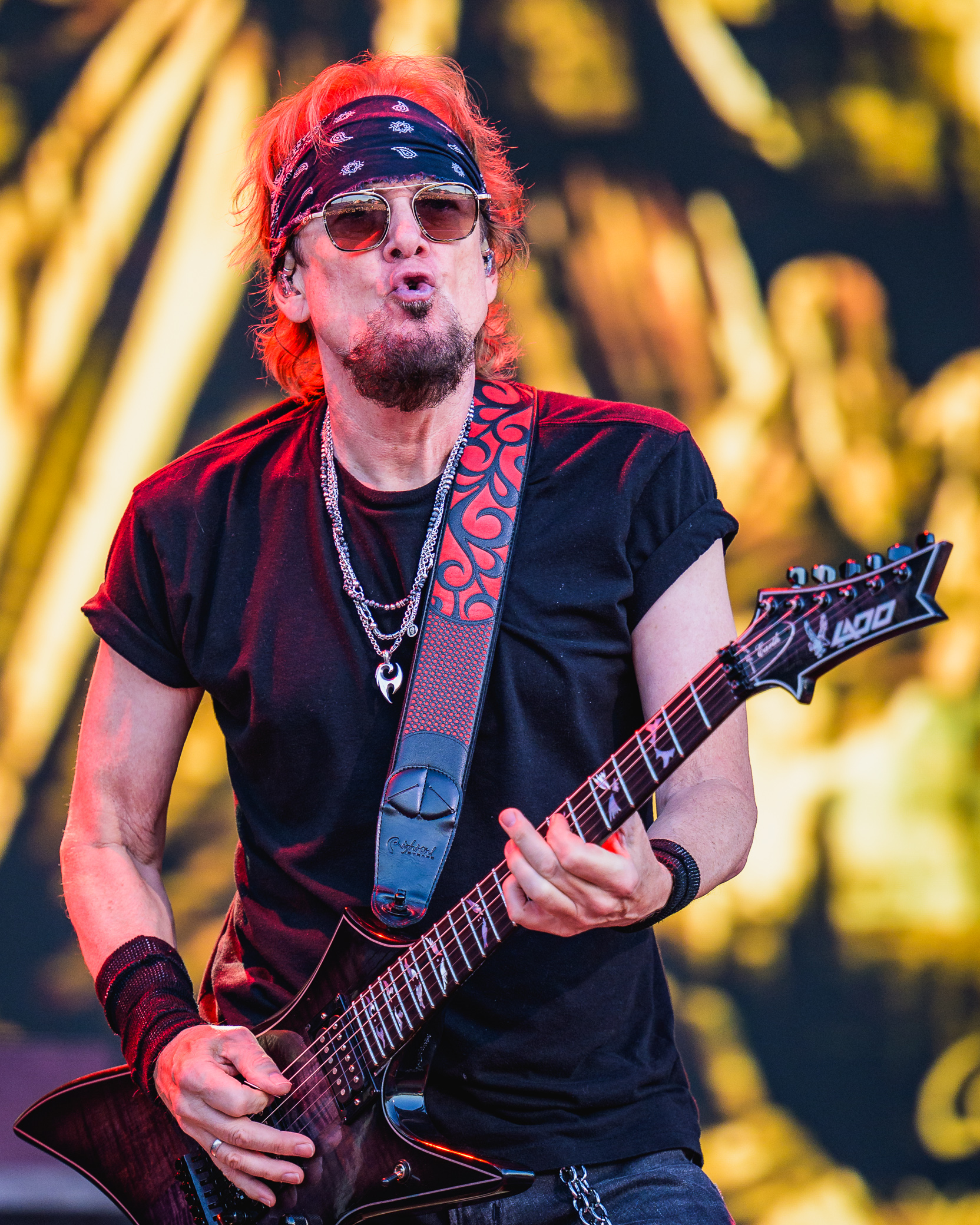
Guitarist Adrian Smith

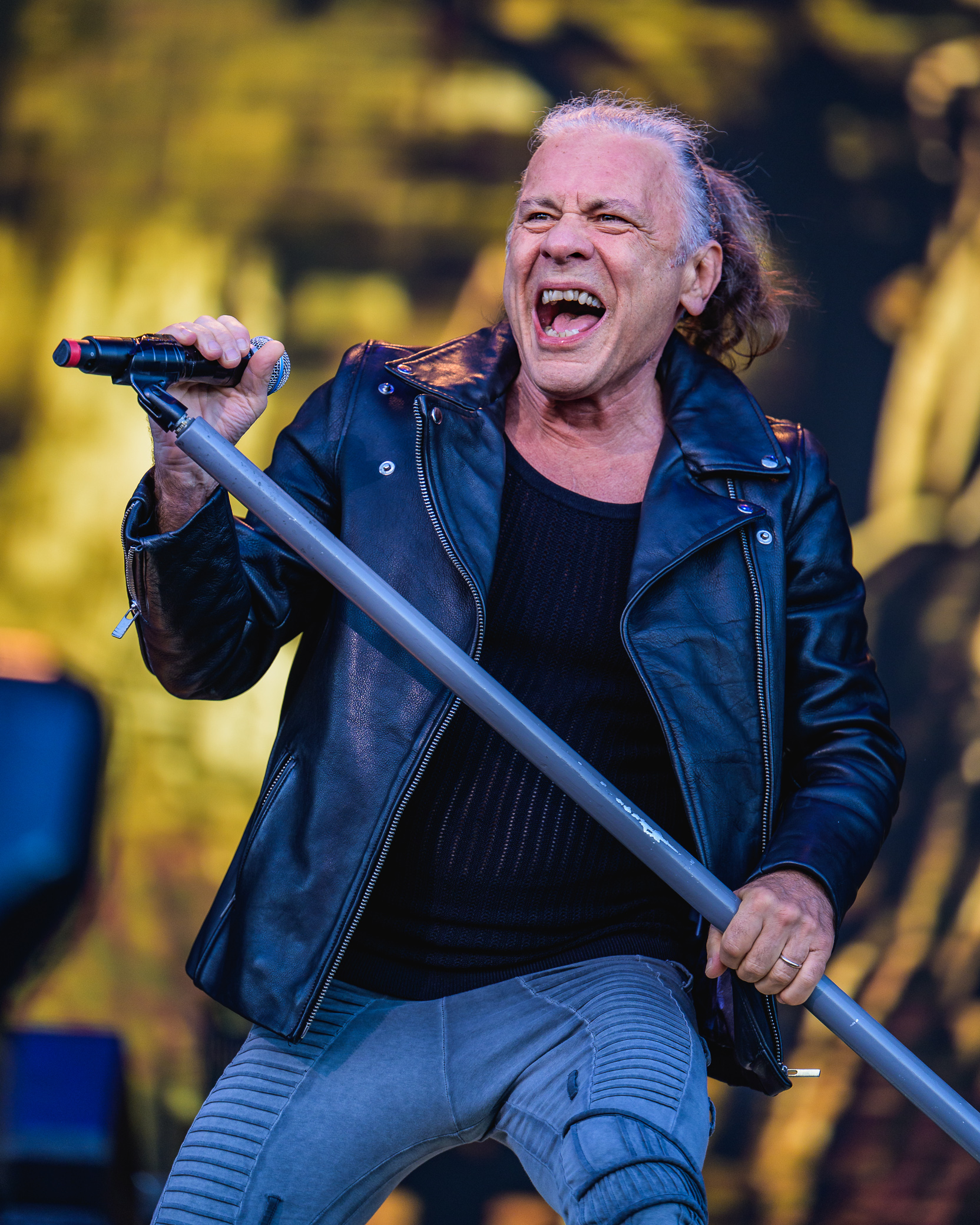
Lead vocalist Bruce Dickinson

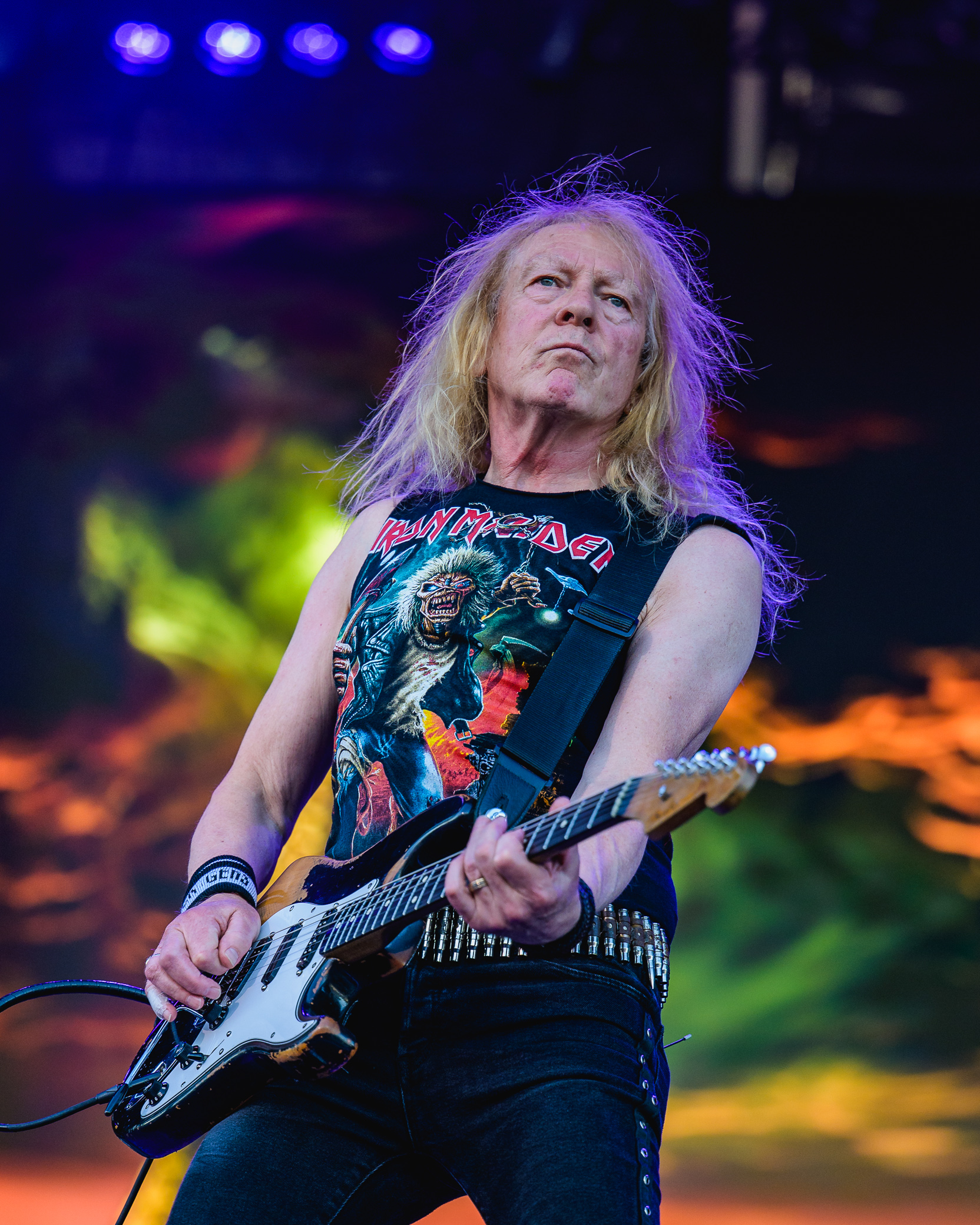
Guitarist Janick Gers

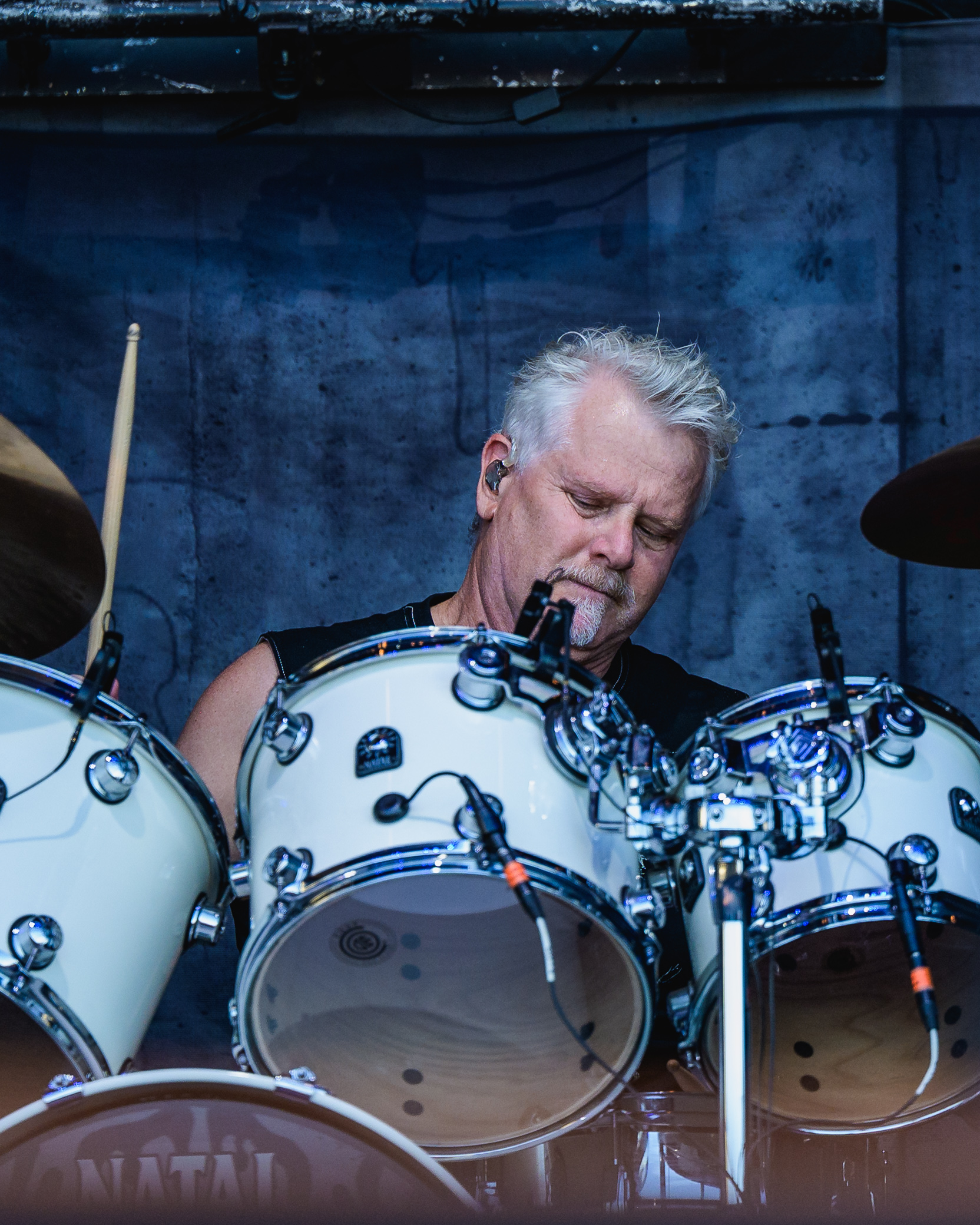
Touring drummer Simon Dawson

Current

- Steve Harris – bass, backing vocals (1975–present); keyboards, synthesizers (1986–1988, 1997–present)
- Dave Murray – guitars (1976–present); guitar synthesizers (1986)
- Adrian Smith – guitars, backing vocals (1980–1990, 1999–present); keyboards, synthesizers (1986–1988, 2006)
- Bruce Dickinson – lead vocals (1981–1993, 1999–present); piano (2014)
- Nicko McBrain – drums (1982–present; not touring 2024–present)
- Janick Gers – guitars (1990–present)

Touring

- Brent Diamond – keyboards (2022–present)
- Simon Dawson – drums (2024–present)

== Discography ==
Studio albums

- Iron Maiden (1980)
- Killers (1981)
- The Number of the Beast (1982)
- Piece of Mind (1983)
- Powerslave (1984)
- Somewhere in Time (1986)
- Seventh Son of a Seventh Son (1988)
- No Prayer for the Dying (1990)
- Fear of the Dark (1992)
- The X Factor (1995)
- Virtual XI (1998)
- Brave New World (2000)
- Dance of Death (2003)
- A Matter of Life and Death (2006)
- The Final Frontier (2010)
- The Book of Souls (2015)
- Senjutsu (2021)

== Concert tours ==
- Metal for Muthas Tour (1980)
- Iron Maiden Tour (1980)
- Killer World Tour (1981)
- The Beast on the Road (1982)
- World Piece Tour (1983)
- World Slavery Tour (1984–1985)
- Somewhere on Tour (1986–1987)
- Seventh Tour of a Seventh Tour (1988)
- No Prayer on the Road (1990–1991)
- Fear of the Dark Tour (1992)
- Real Live Tour (1993)
- The X Factour (1995–1996)
- Virtual XI World Tour (1998)
- The Ed Hunter Tour (1999)
- Brave New World Tour (2000–2002)
- Give Me Ed... 'Til I'm Dead Tour (2003)
- Dance of Death World Tour (2003–2004)
- Eddie Rips Up the World Tour (2005)
- A Matter of Life and Death Tour (2006–2007)
- Somewhere Back in Time World Tour (2008–2009)
- The Final Frontier World Tour (2010–2011)
- Maiden England World Tour (2012–2014)
- The Book of Souls World Tour (2016–2017)
- Legacy of the Beast World Tour (2018–2022)
- The Future Past World Tour (2023–2024)
- Run for Your Lives World Tour (2025–2027)

== See also ==
- List of artists who reached number one on the UK Singles Chart
- List of new wave of British heavy metal bands
- List of music artists and bands from England
- List of songs recorded by Iron Maiden
- List of Iron Maiden tribute albums
- The Iron Maidens
