= The Very Best of Montrose =

Greatest hits album by Montrose
- Released: Oct 17, 2000
- Recorded: 1973–1976, 1987
- Genre: Hard rock
- Length: 76:02
- Label: Rhino

Professional ratings
Review scores
| Source | Rating |
|---|---|
| AllMusic | 4/5 stars |

The Very Best of Montrose is the only compilation album by American hard rock band Montrose. It was released in 2000 by Rhino Records. The album contains songs from the group's five albums, the first four in consecutive years in the mid-seventies and another from 1987.

== Track listing ==
1. "Rock the Nation" (Montrose) – 3:03
2. "Bad Motor Scooter" (Hagar) – 3:41
3. "Space Station #5" (Hagar, Montrose) – 5:18
4. "Rock Candy" (Carmassi, Church, Hagar, Montrose) – 5:05
  - from Montrose (1973)
5. "I Got the Fire" (Montrose) – 3:06
6. "Spaceage Sacrifice" (Hagar, Montrose) – 4:55
7. "We're Going Home" (Montrose) – 4:52
8. "Paper Money" (Hagar, Montrose) – 5:01
  - from Paper Money (1974)
9. "All I Need" (Alcivar, Carmassi, Fitzgerald, James, Montrose) – 4:21
10. "Twenty Flight Rock" (Ned Fairchild/Eddie Cochran) – 2:43
11. "Clown Woman" (Montrose) – 4:21
12. "Dancin' Feet" (Montrose, James) – 4:05
  - from Warner Bros. Presents Montrose! (1975)
13. "Let's Go" (James, Montrose, Alcivar, Carmassi) – 4:15
14. "Jump on It" (James, Montrose, Alcivar, Carmassi) – 3:37
15. "Music Man" (Montrose) – 4:16
  - from Jump on It (1976)
16. "M for Machine" (Montrose) – 3:59
17. "Stand" (Montrose) – 4:46
18. "Ready Willing and Able" (Montrose) – 4:19
  - from Mean (1987)

== Personnel ==
=== Band ===
- Ronnie Montrose – all guitars, lead vocals on track 7
- Sammy Hagar – lead vocals on tracks 1–6, 8
- Denny Carmassi – drums on tracks 1–15
- Bill Church – bass on tracks 1–4
- Alan Fitzgerald – bass on tracks 5–12
- Jim Alcivar – keyboards on tracks 9–15
- Bob James – lead vocals on tracks 9–15
- Johnny Edwards – lead vocals on tracks 16–18
- Glenn Letsch – bass on tracks 16–18
- James Kottak – drums on tracks 16–18

=== Additional musicians ===
- Nick DeCaro – Mellotron on track 7
- Randy Jo Hobbs – bass on tracks 13–14
