= The Best of Gamma =

Greatest hits album by Gamma
- Released: 1992
- Recorded: 1978–1983
- Genre: Hard rock
- Length: 73:29
- Label: GNP Records

Professional ratings
Review scores
Source	Rating
Allmusic	4.5/5 stars

The Best of Gamma is a compilation of music from the first three Gamma albums.

== Track listing ==
1. Mean Streak (Alcivar, Montrose, Pattison) – 4:50 **
2. Four Horsemen (Montrose, Pattison) – 4:48 **
3. Dirty City (Montrose, Pattison) – 4:04 **
4. Voyager (Montrose, Pattison) – 5:23 **
5. "Stranger" (Froom, Stahl) – 3:00 ***
6. "Condition Yellow" (Carmassi, Froom, Montrose) – 4:08 ***
7. "No Way Out" (Froom, Montrose, Stahl) – 4:05 ***
8. "Third Degree" (Froom, Montrose, Stahl) – 3:47 ***
9. "Thunder & Lightning" (Montrose, Pattison) – 4:37 *
10. "I'm Alive" (Clint Ballard Jr.) – 3:18 *
11. "Razor King" (Montrose, Pattison) – 5:53 *
12. "Modern Girl" (Froom, Montrose) – 3:35 ***
13. "Right the First Time" (Froom, Montrose, Stahl) – 3:47 ***
14. "Wish I Was" (Mickey Newbury) – 5:16 *
15. "What's Gone Is Gone" (Froom, Montrose, Jerry Stahl) – 5:30 ***
16. "Fight To The Finish" (Alcivar, Montrose) – 6:25 *

Gamma 1 (1979) – *

Gamma 2 (1980) – **

Gamma 3 (1982) – ***

== Personnel ==
- Ronnie Montrose: Guitar
- Davey Pattison: Vocals
- Jim Alcivar: Keyboards (Gamma 1 & 2)
- Alan Fitzgerald: Bass (Gamma 1)
- Skip Gillette: Drums (Gamma 1)
- Denny Carmassi: Drums (Gamma 2 & 3)
- Glenn Letsch: Bass (Gamma 2 & 3)
- Mitchell Froom: Keyboards (Gamma 3)

== Production ==
- Produced by Ken Scott*, Gary Lyons**, Ronnie Montrose** & ***
- Engineered by Ken Scott*, Gary Lyons**, Jim Gaines***
