= Roll Over and Play Live =

Live album by Ronnie Montrose
- Released: March 1999
- Genre: Instrumental Rock, Hard rock
- Length: 71:39
- Label: RoMoCo
- Producer: Ronnie Montrose

Ronnie Montrose chronology
Mr. Bones (1996)	Roll Over and Play Live (1999)	Bearings (1999)

Roll Over and Play Live is a live album of instrumental rock music by Ronnie Montrose. It was recorded at Magnolia's in Santa Rosa, California in the summer of 1995. It features five original songs: "Feet First", "Cold Film", "Seven Men Riding", "Jungle Boy" and "Greenthing". "Greenthing" adds in a few "Rock Candy" elements from the Montrose album. "Primary Function", "Indigo Spheres", "Largemouth" and "Wish in One Hand" are from the Music From Here album. "Sidewinder" originally appeared on the album The Speed Of Sound.

== Track listing ==
No.	Title	Length
1.	"Feet First" (Ronnie Montrose)	7:47
2.	"Primary Function" (Montrose, Michele Graybeal, Craig McFarland)	5:01
3.	"Indigo Sphres" (Montrose, Graybeal, McFarland)	8:02
4.	"Cold Film" (Montrose)	6:19
5.	"Seven Men Riding" (Montrose)	5:56
6.	"Jungle Boy" (Montrose)	6:22
7.	"Largemouth" (Montrose, Graybeal, McFarland)	6:18
8.	"Greenthing" (Montrose)	6:35
9.	"Sidewinder" (Montrose)	8:07
10.	"Wish in One Hand" (Montrose, Graybeal, McFarland)	5:12

== Personnel ==
- Ronnie Montrose – Guitar
- Michele Graybeal Montrose - Drums
- Craig McFarland – Bass

== Production ==
- Produced by Ronnie Montrose
- Remote recording/live mixing by Jim Mathews
