= Bob Alcivar =

American musician (1938–2025)

- Born: July 8, 1938
- Origin: Chicago, Illinois, U.S.
- Died: September 12, 2025 (aged 87)
- Genres: Rock music, jazz, new-age
- Occupations: Music producer; arranger; composer; conductor; piano; keyboards
- Formerly of: The Signatures

Bob Alcivar (July 8, 1938 – September 12, 2025) was an American music producer, arranger, composer, conductor and keyboard player.

Alcivar died on September 12, 2025, at the age of 87. He was the father of rock keyboard player Jim Alcivar (Montrose, Gamma).

== Discography ==
Name of Artist/group	Title	Year	Role	Notes
The Signatures	The Signatures: Their Voices and Instruments	1957	bass, arranger, vocals	producer: Sid Garris - label: Whippett Records
The Signatures	The Signatures Sign In	1958	as member of	Produced by George Akaklan - label= Warner Brothers
The Signatures	Prepare to Flip!	1959	as member of	Produced by Bob Prince
Julie London	Around Midnight	1960	composer	
The New Christy Minstrels	The Wandering Minstrels	1965	vocal arrangement	
The New Christy Minstrels	New Kick!	1966	arranger, director	
The Association	Birthday	1969	vocal arrangement	
The 5th Dimension	The Age of Aquarius	1969	arranger	
The Association	The Association	1969	arranger	
The Carnival	The Carnival	1969	arranger	
Seals & Crofts	Seals & Crofts	1970	producer	
The Sandpipers	Come Saturday Morning	1970	producer & arranger	
The 5th Dimension	Portrait	1970	arranger	
Robin Wilson	Ain't That Something	1970	producer, arranger	
Sérgio Mendes & Brasil '77	Love Music	1973	arranger, keyboards, vocals	
Tim Weisberg	Dreamspeaker	1974	arranger	
Tom Waits	The Heart of Saturday Night	1974	arranger	
The 5th Dimension	Soul & Inspiration	1974	arranger	
Sérgio Mendes & Brasil '77	Vintage 74	1974	vocal arrangement, rhythm arrangement	
Sérgio Mendes & Brasil '77	Sérgio Mendes	1975	vocal arrangement	
Montrose	Jump On It	1976	string arrangement	
Bette Midler	Broken Blossom	1977	arranger on "I Never Talk To Strangers" (duet with Tom Waits)	
Bruce Johnston	Going Public	1977	horn arrangement, string arrangement	
Tim Weisberg	Live at Last	1977	producer	
Marilyn McCoo & Billy Davis, Jr.	The Two of Us	1977	keyboards	
Ronnie Montrose	Open Fire	1978	orchestra arrangement, conductor	
Tom Waits	Blue Valentine	1978	orchestra	
The Beach Boys	Keepin' the Summer Alive	1980	horn arrangements	
Tom Waits	Heartattack and Vine	1980	string arrangement, orchestral arrangement, conductor	
Seals & Crofts	Longest Road	1980	string arrangement	
Tom Waits	One from the Heart	1982	piano, orchestral arrangement, conductor	
Ceremony	Hang Out Your Poetry	?	arranger, string arrangement	
Jazz at the Movies Band	One from the Heart: Sax at the Movies II	1994	arranger, conductor	
Royal Philharmonic Orchestra	Symphonic Sounds: The Music of Beach Boys	1998	conductor, orchestral arrangement	
Jazz at the Movies	The Bedroom Mixes	2000	arranger	
Bob Alcivar	Bahai Prayers -	2000		

== Film ==
- Butterflies Are Free (1972)
- The Crazy World of Julius Vrooder (1974)
- Olly Olly Oxen Free (1978)
- One From the Heart (1982)
- The Best Little Whorehouse in Texas (arranger, 1982)
- Hysterical (1983)
- That Secret Sunday (TV) (1986)
- Blind Witness (TV) (1999)
- Naked Lie [TV] (1989)
- Roxanne: The Prize Pulitzer [TV] (1989)
- Sparks: The Price of Passion [TV] (1990)
- Deadly Medicine [TV] (1991)
