= Mick Haggerty =

American designer and artist

- Born: England
- Education: Central School of Art; Royal College of Art
- Occupations: Graphic designer; illustrator; art director; music video director; artist
- Notable work: Breakfast in America; Face the Music

Mick Haggerty is an English graphic designer, illustrator, art director, music video director and artist. Haggerty has received four Grammy Award nominations for Best Recording Package for the album Worship and Tribute and in 1980 was jointly awarded, with Mike Doud, the Grammy for Supertramp's Breakfast in America (1979). He also received a Grammy nomination for Best Music Video (short form) in 1986 for The Daryl Hall and John Oates Video Collection.

== Background ==
Born in England and educated in London at the Central School of Art and the Royal College of Art, he moved to Los Angeles in 1973. During the following decades he produced images for many artists. Starting in 1980 he directed many of the first music videos for artists. His editorial illustration includes covers for Time, Vanity Fair, New York Magazine, and New West Magazine. He was a founding partner in various design groups, Art Attack with John Kehe (1975), Neo Plastics with C.D. Taylor (1980) and Brains with Steve Samiof (1994). He served as Art Director at Virgin Records (1992) and Warner Music (2001). Haggerty was a member of the faculty of Otis Parsons School of Design (now Otis College of Art and Design) from 1983–91. His work is included in the collection of the Museum of Modern Art in New York.

== Album and single covers ==
- Tony Cole - Magnificently Mad, 1973
- Bang! - Music, 1973
- John Mayell - Ten Years Are Gone, 1973
- Thunderclap Newman - Hollywood Dream, 1973
- The Ikettes - (G)Old and New, 1974
- Creative Source - Migration, 1974
- The Warner Bros. Music Show, 1974
- Phoebe Snow - Phoebe Snow, 1974
- Electric Light Orchestra – The Night the Light Went On in Long Beach, 1974
- Elvin Bishop - Struttin' My Stuff, 1975
- The Waters - Waters, 1975
- Blackfoot - No Reservations, 1975
- Electric Light Orchestra – Face the Music, (with John Kehe), 1975
- Pointer Sisters - Steppin', 1975 (1976 Grammy Award nominee)
- Hot Tuna - Yellow Fever, 1975
- Lee Ritenour - First Course, 1976
- Bobby Whitlock - Rock Your Sox Off, 1976
- The James Montgomery Band - The James Montgomery Band, 1976
- Del Reeves and Billie Jo Spears - By Request, 1976
- Dave Mason - Let it Flow, 1977
- Cidny Bullens - Desire Wire, 1978
- Kinsman Dazz - Kinsman Dazz, 1978
- The Beach Boys - L.A. (Light Album), 1979
- Jerry Lee Lewis – Jerry Lee Lewis, 1979
- Styx – Cornerstone, 1979
- Supertramp – Breakfast in America, 1979 (1980 Grammy Award winner)
- Nick Glider - Frequency, 1979
- Gamma - Gamma 1, 1979
- Gamma – Gamma 2, 1980
- Mayday - Mayday, 1981
- The Police – Ghost in the Machine 1981
- Paul Collins' Beat - The Kids are the Same, 1982
- Nazareth - 2XS, 1982
- Daryl Hall and John Oates - H2O, 1982
- Jimi Hendrix – Kiss the Sky, 1982
- The Go-Go's – Vacation, 1982 (1983 Grammy Award nominee)
- Daryl Hall and John Oates - Jingle Bell Rock (From Daryll), 1983
- David Bowie – Let's Dance, 1983
- David Bowie – Tonight, 1984
- John Fogerty - The Old Man Down The Road, 1984
- Daryl Hall and John Oates - Big Bam Boom,
- Simple Minds – Alive and Kicking, 1985
- Orchestral Manoeuvres in the Dark – The Pacific Age, 1986
- David Bowie – Never Let Me Down, 1987
- Tom Petty and The Heartbreakers – Let Me Up (I've Had Enough), 1987
- Public Image Ltd – 9, 1989
- Jellyfish – Bellybutton cover spread, 1990
- Keith Richards – Main Offender, 1992
- Jellyfish – Spilt Milk, 1993
- Richard Thompson – Mirror Blue, 1994
- Glassjaw - Worship and Tribute, 2002 (2003 Grammy Award nominee)
