= Paper Money =

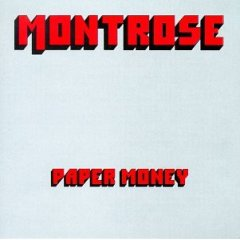

Studio album by Montrose
- Released: October 11, 1974
- Studios: Warner Bros. Recording Studios, North Hollywood, California
- Genres: Rock, hard rock
- Length: 34:50
- Label: Warner Bros.
- Producers: Ted Templeman, Ronnie Montrose

Montrose chronology
Montrose (1973)	Paper Money (1974)	Warner Bros. Presents Montrose! (1975)

Sammy Hagar chronology
Montrose (1973)	Paper Money (1974)	Nine on a Ten Scale (1976)

Singles from Paper Money
- 1. "Paper Money" Released: September 1974; 2. "Connection" Released: November 1974; 3. "I Got the Fire" Released: March 1975 (Japan)

Professional ratings
Review scores
Source	Rating
AllMusic	3/5 stars
Collector's Guide to Heavy Metal	6/10

Paper Money is the second studio album by the American hard rock band Montrose, released on October 11, 1974, by Warner Bros. Records. It was produced by Ted Templeman and is the band's final recording with original vocalist Sammy Hagar. It marks the arrival of new bass player Alan Fitzgerald, replacing original bassist Bill Church.

== History ==
Paper Money was the band's highest-charting release, reaching No. 65 on the Billboard 200. To promote the album, the band appeared live on The Midnight Special television show, performing "Paper Money" and "I Got the Fire".

After building acrimony between Ronnie Montrose and Sammy Hagar reached a peak during the band's 1974–75 European tour to promote Paper Money, Hagar parted ways with the band in early February 1975 and was replaced by vocalist Bob James.

Although the liner notes for the CD edition of Paper Money state that Ronnie Montrose was offered the lead guitar slot for Mott the Hoople when he left the Edgar Winter Group, the guitarist has stated that this never happened.

== Track listing ==
Credits adapted from the album liner notes.

Side one
No.	Title	Writer(s)	Length
1.	"Underground" (Lauren Wood cover)	Ilene Rappaport	3:33
2.	"Connection" (The Rolling Stones cover)	Jagger–Richards	5:42
3.	"The Dreamer"	Sammy Hagar; Ronnie Montrose	3:36
4.	"Starliner" (Instrumental)	Montrose	3:36

Side two
No.	Title	Writer(s)	Length
5.	"I Got the Fire"	Montrose	3:06
6.	"Spaceage Sacrifice"	Hagar; Montrose	4:55
7.	"We're Going Home"	Montrose	4:52
8.	"Paper Money"	Hagar; Montrose	5:01
Total length:			34:50

=== Paper Money (2017 rerelease bonus) ===
On October 13, 2017, Rhino Entertainment released a Deluxe Edition. The bonus disc tracks are from a session on KSAN radio from the Record Plant in Sausalito, California on December 26, 1974.

Deluxe Edition disc 2
No.	Title	Writer(s)	Length
1.	"Intro by Phil Buchanan"		0:29
2.	"I Got the Fire"	Montrose	3:13
3.	"Rock Candy"	Denny Carmassi; Bill Church; Hagar; Montrose	5:59
4.	"Bad Motor Scooter"	Hagar	4:45
5.	"Spaceage Sacrifice"	Hagar; Montrose	6:58
6.	"One and a Half"	Montrose	4:31
7.	"Roll Over Beethoven" (Chuck Berry cover)	Chuck Berry	3:39
8.	"Trouble" (Elvis Presley cover)	Jerry Leiber and Mike Stoller	4:56
9.	"Space Station #5"	Hagar; Montrose	11:40

== Personnel ==
Montrose

- Sammy Hagar – lead vocals (except on "We're Going Home")
- Ronnie Montrose – guitar, lead vocals on "We're Going Home", producer
- Alan Fitzgerald – bass, synthesizer
- Denny Carmassi – drums, backing vocals

Additional musicians

- Mark T. Jordan – piano on "Connection"
- Nick DeCaro – mellotron on "We're Going Home"
- Charles Faris – special effects

Production

- Ted Templeman – producer
- Donn Landee – engineer

== Charts ==
Chart (1974)	Peak position
Canada Top Albums/CDs (RPM)	73
US Billboard 200	65

== Other sources ==
- Montrose; Paper Money liner notes; Warner Brothers Records 1974
