= Twenty Flight Rock =

Single by Eddie Cochran
- B-side: "Cradle Baby"
- Released: November 1957
- Studio: Gold Star, Hollywood
- Genre: Rock and roll, rockabilly
- Length: 1:42
- Label: Liberty
- Songwriters: Eddie Cochran; Ned Fairchild
- Producer: Simon Jackson

Eddie Cochran singles chronology
"Drive In Show" (1957)	"Twenty Flight Rock" (1957)	"Jeannie Jeannie Jeannie" (1958)

Official audio
- "Twenty Flight Rock" on YouTube

"Twenty Flight Rock" is a song originally performed by Eddie Cochran in the 1956 film comedy The Girl Can't Help It, and released as a single the following year. The song was published in 1957 as written by Ned Fairchild and Eddie Cochran, by American Music Incorporated and Campbell, Connelly and Company. Cochran's contribution was primarily on the music. His version is rockabilly-flavored, but artists of a variety of genres have covered the song.

== Background ==
The first version of "Twenty Flight Rock" was recorded by Cochran in July 1956 at Gold Star Studios, with Connie Smith on the bull fiddle and Jerry Capehart thumping a soup carton. Cochran re-recorded the song sometime between May and August 1957. This later version was released in the United States (Liberty 55112) with "Cradle Baby" as a flipside. It was a moderate seller, but was more popular in Europe and had steady sales for a long period. The song is from the point of view of a man whose girlfriend lives on the twentieth floor of a high-rise apartment building with a broken elevator, forcing him to climb the stairs (exhausting himself) to reach her.

The song follows the twelve-bar blues format, using the device of counting upwards ("One flight, two flight, three flight, four/five, six, seven flight, eight flight, more") in the refrain in a manner similar to "Rock Around the Clock". The final verse ends on a surprisingly morbid note compared to other pop songs of the time: "All this climbin' is a-gettin' me down. They'll find my corpse draped over a rail."

The barely 15-year-old Paul McCartney used "Twenty Flight Rock" as his first song when he auditioned for John Lennon on July 6, 1957, in Liverpool, England. The 16-year-old Lennon, introduced that day to McCartney at St. Peter's Church Hall prior to a church garden fete, was impressed by his new acquaintance's ability to play the song on the guitar. The good first impression of McCartney's performance led to an invitation to join the Quarrymen—Lennon's band that would eventually evolve into the Beatles. On The Beatles Anthology, McCartney noted that: "I think what impressed him most was that I knew all the words."

Cochran appeared in the film The Girl Can't Help It performing "Twenty Flight Rock" as a tongue-in-cheek example of the supposed lack of classically trained vocal ability required to perform rock and roll. The guitar solo was edited out in the movie. The song also featured in the film The Delinquents (1989).

== Musicians, 1956 version ==
- Eddie Cochran – guitar, vocals
- Connie "Guybo" Smith – double bass
- Jerry Capehart – box slapping

== Musicians, 1957 version ==
- Eddie Cochran – guitars, vocals
- Perry Botkin Sr. – rhythm guitar
- Connie "Guybo" Smith – double bass
- The Johnny Mann Chorus – backing vocals

== Notable cover versions ==
- Cliff Richard and The Shadows recorded a rendition on Richard's 1959 second album Cliff Sings.
- Paul McCartney sang the song for John Lennon when they met for the first time in 1957 at his audition to be admitted into Lennon's group, The Quarrymen. He would record a studio version on the 1988 album, CHOBA B CCCP, and a live version was included in the 1999 concert film, Live at the Cavern Club.
- Vince Taylor released a version on 1961's Le Rock C'est Ça!.
- Dickie Rock and the Miami Showband released a version on a 7-inch single in 1964 on Piccadilly Records.
- Commander Cody and His Lost Planet Airmen released a version on their 1971 album Lost in the Ozone.
- Montrose released a version on their 1975 album Warner Bros. Presents Montrose!.
- Robert Gordon and Link Wray recorded a version on their 1978 album Fresh Fish Special.
- The Rolling Stones released a version on their 1982 album Still Life. Recorded during the band's American Tour 1981.
- Tiger Army included a version on its 1999 debut album Tiger Army.
- Conan O'Brien performed it as a duet with Jack White at the Nashville date of the former's Legally Prohibited from Being Funny on Television Tour in 2010, which was included on the live album, Conan O’Brien – Live At Third Man. The two would repeat this rendition on the first episode of Conan.
