= Gamma 2 =

Album by Gamma

Studio album by Gamma
- Released: August 1980
- Studio: The Automatt, San Francisco
- Genre: Hard rock, heavy metal
- Length: 36:50
- Label: Elektra
- Producer: Gary Lyons, Ronnie Montrose

Gamma chronology
Gamma 1 (1979)	Gamma 2 (1980)	Gamma 3 (1982)

Ronnie Montrose chronology
Gamma 1 (1979)	Gamma 2 (1980)	Gamma 3 (1982)

Professional ratings
Review scores
Source	Rating
AllMusic	3/5 stars
Collector's Guide to Heavy Metal	10/10

Gamma 2 is Gamma's second album, released in 1980. On this album Ronnie Montrose keeps his streak of not having the same personnel on two albums in a row, changing the line-up once again. Davey Pattison (vocals), Montrose (guitar), and Jim Alcivar (synthesizer) remain from Gamma 1. Glenn Letsch replaces Alan Fitzgerald on bass and old Montrose bandmate Denny Carmassi replaces Skip Gillette on drums.

== Cover ==
The cover image was photographed by Jeffrey Scales to a design by Mick Haggerty. The original image had a lone woman on the sunbed but a man was added after record executives raised concerns over the appearance of sharks attacking vulnerable woman. Mick Haggerty felt the change improved the image.

== Track listing ==
Side one

1. "Mean Streak" (Ronnie Montrose, Davey Pattison, Jim Alcivar) – 4:50
2. "Four Horsemen" (Montrose, Pattison) – 4:48
3. "Dirty City" (Montrose, Pattison) – 4:04
4. "Voyager" (Montrose, Pattison) – 5:23

Side two

5. "Something in the Air" (John "Speedy" Keen) – 3:17
6. "Cat on a Leash" (Montrose, Jerry Stahl) – 4:03
7. "Skin and Bone" (Montrose, Stahl) – 4:48
8. "Mayday" (Montrose, Alcivar) – 5:37

== Personnel ==
All credits adapted from the original release.

Gamma

- Davey Pattison – lead vocals
- Ronnie Montrose – guitar, producer
- Jim Alcivar – keyboards
- Glenn Letsch – bass guitar
- Denny Carmassi – drums

Additional musicians

- Genya Ravan – additional vocals on "Dirty City"

Production

- Gary Lyons – producer, engineer, mixing at Mediasound Studios, New York City
- Ken Kessie, Peter Thea, Wayne Lewis – assistant engineers
- George Marino – mastering at Sterling Sound, New York
