= Open Fire (Ronnie Montrose album) =

1978 studio album by Ronnie Montrose

Studio album by Ronnie Montrose
- Released: January 1978
- Studio: At Group IV Recording Studios, Hollywood, California
- Genre: Instrumental rock, jazz fusion
- Length: 35:27
- Label: Warner Bros.
- Producer: Edgar Winter

Ronnie Montrose chronology
| Jump On It (1976) | Open Fire (1978) | Gamma 1 (1979) |

Professional ratings
Review scores
| Source | Rating |
|---|---|
| Allmusic | 3/5 stars |

Open Fire is the debut studio album by American musician, guitarist and session musician Ronnie Montrose, released in 1978. The album contains jazz, rock and acoustic music concepts similar to those of Blow by Blow (1975) by Jeff Beck.

Ronnie hints in previous Montrose releases that he was heading for a solo career. Songs like "Whaler" and "One And a Half" from Warner Brothers Presents... Montrose! and "Tuft-Sedge" and "Merry-Go-Round" from Jump On It contained various acoustic, synthesizer and string elements that showed Ronnie was looking to branch out from his hard rock persona.

Ronnie reunited with Edgar Winter, who produced the album and played piano and keyboards as well. The album also features Montrose alumni Jim Alcivar on keyboards, Alan Fitzgerald on bass and drummer Rick Shlosser, who worked with Ronnie on Van Morrison's Tupelo Honey.

== Content ==
The album begins with "Openers," an orchestral piece very similar in style to The Planets by Gustav Holst, which blends into "Open Fire," the closest thing to a straight-ahead rocker on this disc with an unmistakable Ronnie Montrose lead guitar sound. "Mandolinia" begins with a Moog sequencer bass followed by layers of mandolin sounds and guitars. "Town Without Pity" is a cover that replaces Gene Pitney's vocals with lead guitar work by Ronnie and backed by piano from Edgar Winter; Bob Alcivar handles the orchestral arrangements. "Leo Rising" is an acoustic guitar piece. "Heads Up" and "Rocky Road" are two examples of jazz fusion. "My Little Mystery" features more acoustic guitar with Edgar Winter manning the harpsichord and further use of Bob Alcivar's orchestra, resulting in a Baroque ending. The album ends with a song titled "No Beginning/No End." A Moog-based synth intro by Jim Alcivar starts the song; Ronnie then enters with acoustic playing before closing the song with trademark electric soloing.

On the strength of this effort, Montrose was invited to perform with accomplished jazz and jazz fusion drummer Tony Williams. On July 27, 1978, Montrose joined Williams, Brian Auger (keyboards), Mario Cipollina (bass) and special guest Billy Cobham also on drums for a show in Tokyo as the "Tony Williams All Stars". The setlist included "Rocky Road", "Heads Up" and "Open Fire" and the "Open Fire" performance appears on The Joy of Flying by Tony Williams (1978).

== Track listing ==
Side one

1. "Openers" - (Bob Alcivar) - 2:54
2. "Open Fire" - (Ronnie Montrose, Edgar Winter) - 3:53
  - Ronnie Montrose - guitar, theremin
  - Jim Alcivar - Moog synthesizer, sequencer programming
  - Alan Fitzgerald - bass
  - Rick Schlosser - drums
3. "Mandolinia" - (Montrose) - 3:14
  - Ronnie Montrose - guitar, mandolin, mandocello
  - Jim Alcivar - sequencer programming
  - Edgar Winter - bass synthesizer
  - Rick Schlosser - drums
4. "Town Without Pity" - (Dimitri Tiomkin, Ned Washington) - 3:17
  - Ronnie Montrose - guitar
  - Edgar Winter - piano
  - Alan Fitzgerald - bass
  - Rick Schlosser - drums
5. "Leo Rising" - (Montrose) - 3:49
  - Ronnie Montrose - guitar
  - Jim Alcivar - Ondes Martenot

Side two

6. "Heads Up" - (Montrose, Winter) - 3:39
  - Ronnie Montrose - guitar
  - Alan Fitzgerald - bass
  - Rick Schlosser - drums
7. "Rocky Road" - (John "Big Johnny" Thomassie, Charlie Brent, Jon Smith) - 4:23
  - Ronnie Montrose - guitar
  - Edgar Winter - piano
  - Alan Fitzgerald - bass
  - Rick Schlosser - drums
8. "My Little Mystery" - (Montrose) - 4:40
  - Ronnie Montrose - guitar
  - Edgar Winter - harpsichord
9. "No Beginning/No End" - (Montrose)- 5:54
  - Ronnie Montrose - guitar
  - Jim Alcivar - Moog synthesizer, effects
  - Edgar Winter - piano
  - Alan Fitzgerald - bass
  - Rick Schlosser - drums

== Personnel ==
- Ronnie Montrose – guitar, theremin, mandolin, mandocello
- Edgar Winter - piano, harpsichord, Moog sequencer bass, producer
- Jim Alcivar - Moog synthesizer, Ondes Martenot, sequencer programming
- Alan Fitzgerald – bass
- Rick Shlosser – drums
- Bob Alcivar - orchestra arrangement, conductor

=== Production ===
- Edgar Winter - producer
- Dick Bogert - engineer
