= Rock Candy (song) =

Song by Montrose

from the album Montrose
- Released: October 17, 1973
- Recorded: 1973
- Genre: Hard rock, blues rock
- Length: 5:03
- Label: Warner Bros.
- Songwriters: Sammy Hagar, Ronnie Montrose, Bill Church, Denny Carmassi
- Producer: Ted Templeman

Audio video
- "Rock Candy" on YouTube

"Rock Candy" is a song by American hard rock band Montrose, and the last song written and recorded for their 1973 debut album. It was composed by all four band members. The song still gets performed on Sammy Hagar's solo tours and even had been re-recorded as the B-side to the Hagar single "Little White Lie" by the original band. It was also included on Hagar's 2003 live release Live: Hallelujah.

The song is well known for its distinctive drum intro played by Denny Carmassi. According to Ronnie Montrose in radio interviews, the song originated from Carmassi's experimentation with alternatives to Led Zeppelin drummer John Bonham's intro to "When the Levee Breaks". According to Hagar,

'Rock Candy' is like a standard for bands like Def Leppard or The Cult. Over the years, anybody who wants to jam with me wants to jam 'Rock Candy' – Chad Smith, Joe Satriani, Matt Sorum, Slash. Lemmy from Motörhead came up to me at a show in England, and what did Lemmy say? 'Fucking Rock Candy, mate'.

The song was featured in the 1994 movie The Stöned Age, and has appeared in the U.S. television series My Name is Earl. In May 2015, Hagar sang the song with Daryl Hall and Hall's band at Hagar's Cabo Wabo nightclub for an episode of Live from Daryl's House.

A recording of "Rock Candy" by Montrose can be heard in a helicopter shot from the 1976 version of the film A Star is Born. It was filmed at a concert put on by the producers of the film at Sun Devil Stadium at Arizona State University on March 20, 1976.

== Cover versions ==
- BulletBoys for the Wayne's World soundtrack in 1992. Like the original Montrose version, this was produced by Ted Templeman.
- Dixie Witch for the 1970s cover compilation album Sucking the 70's – Back in the Saddle Again.
- Canadian rocker Lee Aaron covered the song in her album Bodyrock.
- L.A. Guns covered the song during their early years.
- Felix Hanemann of the band Zebra included it on his debut solo album Rock Candy in 1999.
- Lita Ford covered it as part of her live album Live & Deadly.
