= Territory (Ronnie Montrose album) =

Studio album by Ronnie Montrose
- Released: October 1986
- Studio: The Music Annex, Menlo Park, California
- Genre: Instrumental rock, jazz fusion, jazz-rock, ambient
- Length: 38:25
- Label: Passport
- Producer: Ronnie Montrose

Ronnie Montrose chronology
Gamma 3 (1982)	Territory (1986)	Mean (1987)

Territory is Ronnie Montrose's second album of instrumental jazz fusion music although there are vocals on "Love You To" and "I Spy" published in 1986.

Professional ratings
Review scores
Source	Rating
Allmusic	2/5 stars

== Track listing ==
1. "Catscan" (Ronnie Montrose) – 5:04
2. "I'm Gonna Be Strong" (Barry Mann, Cynthia Weil) – 2:53
3. "Love You To" (George Harrison) – 4:43
4. "Odd Man Out" (Montrose) – 3:53
5. "I Spy" (Montrose) – 4:20
6. "Territory" (Montrose) – 4:28
7. "Synestesia" (Montrose) – 3:26
8. "Pentagon" (Montrose) – 3:58
9. "Women of Ireland" (Seán Ó Riada) – 5:37

== Personnel ==
- Ronnie Montrose – guitar, mandolin, bass guitar, keyboards, koto, Steiner head, vocals on "Love You To" and "I Spy"
- Hilary Hanes – bass guitar
- Steve Bellino – drums
- Andre B. Chapman – drums
- Patrick Feehan – keyboards
- Mitchell Froom – keyboards
- Kevin Monaghan – keyboards
- Doug Morton – keyboards
- Edgar Winter – saxophone on "Catscan"
- Barbara Imhoff – harp on "Women of Ireland"
- Michael Beese – electric violin
- Keeta Bill – vocals on "I Spy"

== Production ==
- Produced by Ronnie Montrose
- Engineered by Roger Wiersema and Ronnie Montrose
- Cover artwork by Marc Bonilla and Paul Bonilla
