= Bearings (album) =

Studio album by Ronnie Montrose
- Released: April 1999
- Genre: Instrumental rock, acoustic music
- Length: 55:14
- Label: RoMoCo
- Producer: Ronnie Montrose

Ronnie Montrose chronology
Roll Over and Play Live (1999)	Bearings (1999)	Gamma 4 (2000)

Bearings is an album of acoustic instrumental rock music by Ronnie Montrose and the last solo album released in his lifetime before his death in 2012.

== Track listing ==
All tracks are written by Ronnie Montrose.

No.	Title	Length
1.	"All Aboard"	2:50
2.	"Breathe Deep"	2:46
3.	"Solid Ground"	3:52
4.	"The Map is Not the Road"	4:20
5.	"Morning"	4:49
6.	"The Whole Truth"	4:55
7.	"Lunarization"	4:14
8.	"Forever is Now"	4:10
9.	"Three Wishes"	3:20
10.	"She's Watching"	5:12
11.	"This is Only a Test"	3:56
12.	"Line of Reason"	4:40
13.	"Lighthouse"	2:45
14.	"Soul Repair"	3:37

== Personnel ==
- Ronnie Montrose – acoustic guitar, mandolin, acoustic bass guitar
- Ed Roth - keyboards
- Michele Graybeal Montrose - percussion
- CJ Hutchins - acoustic guitar on "Line of Reason"

== Production ==
- Produced by Ronnie Montrose
- Basic guitar tracks co-produced and engineered by Ronnie Montrose and David Culiner
- Recorded and mixed by Ronnie Montrose at RoMoCo Studios
- Mastered by Charles Choi at RoMoCo Studios
