= Gamma (band) =

American rock band

- Gamma in 1980. Left to right: Jim Alcivar, Ronnie Montrose, Denny Carmassi, Davey Pattison, Glenn Letsch

Background information
- Origin: San Francisco, California, U.S.
- Genres: Hard rock, AOR
- Years active: 1978–1983, 2000
- Labels: Warner Bros., Elektra
- Past members: Ronnie Montrose; Davey Pattison; Jim Alcivar; Glenn Letsch; Skip Gillette; Denny Carmassi; Alan Fitzgerald; Mitchell Froom

Gamma was an American hard rock band formed by guitarist Ronnie Montrose and singer Davey Pattison in San Francisco in 1979. They released four albums: Gamma 1 (1979), Gamma 2 (1980), Gamma 3 (1982) (all on Elektra Records) and Gamma 4 (2000). Their biggest hit was 1980's "I'm Alive", which peaked at #60 on the Billboard Hot 100. "Right The First Time" in 1982 was a minor chart entry in the US, but a top 40 hit in Canada. Some of their other best known songs include "Fight to the Finish" from their first album, and "Meanstreak" and "Voyager" from the second album.

== History ==
=== Original incarnation (1979–1983) ===
Ronnie Montrose put the band together after having released a solo album Open Fire in 1978, after having disbanded the hard rock band Montrose in 1977. Gamma was a far more AOR-oriented band than Montrose, and used a lot of the latest keyboard technology in its sound.

The debut album Gamma 1 was released in 1979 and reached No. 131 on the Billboard 200, totalling 17 weeks on the chart. Gamma scored a hit single with "I'm Alive" which got to No. 60 on the Billboard Hot 100 chart. "I'm Alive" had significant airplay on KSHE, St. Louis, Missouri. The original lineup of Ronnie Montrose (guitars), Davey Pattison (vocals), Alan Fitzgerald (bass), Jim Alcivar (keyboards) and Skip Gillette (drums) recorded this album. Guitarist Montrose, bassist Fitzgerald and keyboardist Alcivar had all been members of the band Montrose.

Gamma 2 was issued in 1980. Alan Fitzgerald (who later joined Night Ranger as their keyboardist) was replaced by bassist Glenn Letsch, and Denny Carmassi (another ex-Montrose member) came in on drums. The album had a cover design by Mick Haggerty, featuring two sharks with only their fins visible burrowing through a lawn that was being sprinkled. The album peaked at No. 65, and featured a heavier sound. (e.g. "Mean Streak" and "Cat on a Leash"). There was also a cover version of Thunderclap Newman's "Something in the Air". It was produced by Gary Lyons and Ronnie Montrose.

Keyboardist Jim Alcivar was replaced by Mitchell Froom and Gamma 3 was released in 1982. The album reached No. 72 and produced the single "Right the First Time" which reached No. 77 on the Billboard Hot 100 and No. 10 on Billboard's Album Rock Tracks chart. In Canada, "Right the First Time" peaked at No. 27, making the song the band's only top 40 hit on their national pop chart. The album's opening track, "What's Gone Is Gone", and tracks like "No Way Out", were arena rockers, while others like "Condition Yellow" and "Moving Violation", continued the odd writing style and sounds that the band started with on their debut album.

However, Gamma's label Elektra Records never really promoted the band, and with only moderate sales, they disbanded.

=== Post-break-up activities ===
- Ronnie Montrose resumed solo activities, releasing a series of instrumental albums with little success, before reforming Montrose in 1987 with a new lineup. He committed suicide on March 3, 2012.
- Davey Pattison went on to sing for Robin Trower, and also sang on two songs on Ronnie Montrose's 1990 solo album, The Diva Station.
- Denny Carmassi went on to drum for over a decade with Heart, then played with Coverdale/Page and Whitesnake. In 2002 he joined Foreigner for touring duties.
- Mitchell Froom went on to become a record producer in the 1980s and 1990s, producing albums for Elvis Costello, Los Lobos, Crowded House, Suzanne Vega, Paul McCartney, the Del Fuegos, Bonnie Raitt, and many others.
- Glenn Letsch went on to work with Monty Byrom in the band New Frontier. He has also performed the bass on Montrose's Mean (1987) album and toured with Robin Trower.

=== Reunion (2000) ===
Montrose reunited with Pattison in the 1990s and reactivated the band in 2000. The new line-up was Davey Pattison (vocals), Ronnie Montrose (guitar), Denny Carmassi (drums), Glenn Letsch (bass), and Ed Roth (keyboards). Carmassi and Letsch had also played on Gamma 2 and 3; Roth was a new addition to the band. In an interview around the time of the release of Gamma 4 (2000) Carmassi stated "For me, it was a chance to play with Ronnie again. I always loved playing with him. There are certain people you "get off" playing with. I've played with many guitar players over the years, some with big reputations, and Ronnie stands out as one of the best." The group recorded the album Gamma 4 before once again dissolving.

=== Remastering (2011–2013) ===
In 2011, Rock Candy Records, a reissue label in the UK, began remastering and releasing the Gamma catalogue. They started with Gamma 2 which includes 24 bit remastering from original source tapes and extensive liner notes with comments from Glenn Letsch.

Gamma 1 was remastered in 2013 by Jon Astley, (who remixed the remasters for The Who) and features a new interview with vocalist Davey Pattison.

Gamma 3 includes interview comments from Glenn Letsch, Davey Pattison and drummer Denny Carmassi plus a single edit of "Right the First Time" as a bonus track.

=== Gamma (2013–present) ===
After the death of Ronnie Montrose on March 3, 2012, the original members of Gamma (plus Marc Bonilla on guitar) performed to a sell out memorial concert in San Francisco, California. It was here that former Montrose manager/promoter Jim Douglas of Primetime Entertainment suggested that Pattison form a new band. Gamma was reformed with Pattison on vocals, Dan Buch (Butch) on drums, Van Spragins on bass, Tommy Merry on guitar and Brad Barth on keyboards. Notably Gamma performed with Deep Purple in Saratoga, California in the summer of 2014 and with Boston in Lincoln, California in the summer of 2016.

== Personnel ==
- Davey Pattison – vocals
- Ronnie Montrose – guitar
- Jim Alcivar – keyboards (Gamma 1 & 2)
- Mitchell Froom – keyboards (Gamma 3)
- Ed Roth – keyboards (Gamma 4)
- Alan Fitzgerald – bass (Gamma 1)
- Glenn Letsch – bass (Gamma 2, 3 & 4)
- Skip Gillette – drums (Gamma 1)
- Denny Carmassi – drums (Gamma 2, 3 & 4)
- Dan Buch – drums
- Tommy Merry – guitar
- Van Spragins – bass
- Brad Barth – keyboards

== Discography ==
=== Studio albums ===
- Gamma 1 (1979)
- Gamma 2 (1980)
- Gamma 3 (1982)
- Gamma 4 (2000)

=== Live albums ===
- Concert Classics (1998) (a bootleg of a 1979 concert in Denver, Colorado, USA)

=== Compilation albums ===
- The Best of Gamma (1992)
