= 10x10 (album) =

Studio album by Ronnie Montrose
- Released: September 29, 2017
- Recorded: 2003–2017
- Genre: Hard rock
- Length: 46:02
- Label: Rhino Records
- Producers: Ronnie Montrose, Ricky Phillips

Ronnie Montrose chronology
Gamma 4 (2000)	10x10 (2017)

10x10 is a posthumous solo album by Ronnie Montrose. Ronnie had been touring with bassist Ricky Phillips (Styx, The Babys) and Eric Singer (Kiss) in the early 2000s. Over three days in 2003 at Doug Messenger's studio in North Hollywood, the sessions produced 10 strong tracks of rhythm guitar, bass and drums with the intention to get a singer for the vocals. Eventually Ronnie decided on the 10x10 concept, 10 tracks and 10 different singers. Early on, he was able to secure contributions from close friends and collaborators like Sammy Hagar, Edgar Winter and Davey Pattison. In the intervening years Ronnie battled prostate cancer and, at one point, hadn't touched a guitar for 2 years.

Conflicts in scheduling led to the record remaining unfinished for years up until Montrose's passing in 2012. Along with completion of the vocals, the songs also needed lead guitar as well. Ricky Phillips, with the blessing of Ronnie's wife Leighsa and assistance of Eric Singer, picked up the reins and completed the album. "After he passed, I had to carry on with what Ronnie wanted, because he was such a purist. The songs were cut to 2-inch tape and then transferred to digital, but I really needed it to be a cohesive record. I've done enough records to know how easily the levels of 10 different singers can sound disjointed if you don't stay on top of the production."

According to Singer, "I have to give a lot of credit to Ricky Phillips. Ricky really wanted to see this thing through. It was more for Ronnie than just for himself, or for ourselves. We really believed what we had originally captured had a certain vibe and a certain magic to the people in that room when it was created. We felt like, 'Hey, this thing needs to get done. We need to see this thing through, for every good reason.'"

The 10x10 liner notes credit Leighsa Montrose for the cover concept and confirm that the waveform graphic originates from “Head On Straight,” courtesy of Warner Bros. Studios, with the original sound wave captured by Steve Ledesma.

== Track listing ==
1. "Heavy Traffic" (Montrose/Martin/Pressis/Phillips)
2. "Love Is An Art" (Montrose/Winter)
3. "Color Blind" (Montrose/Hagar)
4. "Still Singin' With The Band" (Montrose/Phillips/Mensinger)
5. "Strong Enough" (Montrose/Phillips/Shaw/Mensinger)
6. "Any Minute" (Montrose/Farner)
7. "The Kingdom's Come Undone" (Montrose/Phillips)
8. "One Good Reason" (Montrose/Turgon)
9. "Head On Straight" (Montrose/Phillips/Mensinger)
10. "I'm Not Lying" (Montrose/Phillips/Rolie)

== Personnel ==
On all tracks

- Ronnie Montrose - main guitar
- Ricky Phillips - bass
- Eric Singer - drums

Additional personnel

Heavy Traffic

- Eric Martin - lead and backing vocals
- Dave Meniketti - guitar solo
- Ed Roth - organ and piano
- J'nae Fincannon and Debby Holiday - backing vocals

Love Is An Art

- Edgar Winter - lead and harmony vocals, Hammond organ, saxophone
- Rick Derringer - guitar solo
- Ricky Phillips - synth bass, tambourine and percussion

Color Blind

- Sammy Hagar - lead vocals
- Steve Lukather - guitar solo
- Ricky Phillips - Hammond organ, Wurlitzer electric piano, harmony guitars and backing vocals
- J'nae Fincannon, Debby Holiday and Jeff Scott Soto - backing vocals
- Todd Sucherman - percussion

Still Singin' With The Band

- Glenn Hughes - lead and backing vocals
- Phil Collen - guitar solo
- Jimmy "Z" Zavala - harmonica
- Ricky Phillips - Hammond organ and backing vocals
- Jeff Scott Soto - backing vocals

Strong Enough

- Tommy Shaw - lead and backing vocals, slide guitar solo, electric & high strung guitars
- Ricky Phillips - atmospheric synth, keys, percussion and backing vocals
- Ed Roth - organ and piano
- Todd Sucherman - percussion

Any Minute

- Mark Farner - lead and backing vocals, guitar solo
- Ricky Phillips - Hammond organ and backing vocals
- J'nae Fincannon and Debby Holiday - backing vocals
- Jimmy "Z" Zavala - harmonica

The Kingdom's Come Undone

- Ricky Phillips - lead and backing vocals, harmony guitars and Hammond organ
- Joe Bonamassa - guitar solo
- Ed Roth - keyboards

One Good Reason

- Bruce Turgon - lead and vocals
- Brad Whitford - guitar solo
- Ricky Phillips - percussion, Hammond organ from guitar solo out
- Ed Roth - Hammond organ

Head On Straight

- Davey Pattison - lead vocals
- Marc Bonilla - guitar solo
- Ricky Phillips - Hammond organ, backing vocals
- Bruce Turgon - backing vocals

I'm Not Lying

- Gregg Rolie - lead and backing vocals, synthesizers and keyboards
- Tom Gimbel - saxophone
- Ricky Phillips - 12 string guitar, acoustic guitar, Hammond organ, coda arrangement, percussion and backing vocals
- Todd Sucherman - percussion
- Jeff Scott Soto and Debby Holiday - backing vocals
- Lawrence Gowan - piano
