= Gamma 4 =

Studio album by Gamma
- Released: 2000
- Studios: TML Studios and RoMoCo Studios
- Genre: Rock
- Length: 50:24
- Label: RoMoCo
- Producer: Ronnie Montrose

Gamma chronology
Gamma 3 (1982)	Gamma 4 (2000)

Ronnie Montrose chronology
Bearings (1999)	Gamma 4 (2000)	10x10 (2017)

Professional ratings
Review scores
Source	Rating
AllMusic	3/5 stars

Gamma 4 is Gamma's fourth and final album and was originally released on Ronnie Montrose's own label, RoMoCo, in 2000. In 2005, it was re-released by Wounded Bird Records.

== Track listing ==
All credits adapted from the original release.

No.	Title	Length
1.	"Darkness to Light" (Ronnie Montrose, Davey Pattison)	5:35
2.	"Love Will Find You" (Montrose, CJ Hutchins)	4:18
3.	"Resurrection Shuffle" (Tony Ashton)	4:36
4.	"Oh No You Don't!" (Montrose)	4:30
5.	"Bad Reputation" (Montrose, Pattison)	4:05
6.	"Last Man on Earth" (Montrose)	7:55
7.	"The Only One" (Montrose, Pattison)	3:52
8.	"Out of These Hands" (Montrose, Hutchins)	5:24
9.	"Prayers" (Montrose, Pattison)	3:36
10.	"The Low Road Home" (Montrose, Pattison)	6:33

== Personnel ==
- Davey Pattison – vocals
- Ronnie Montrose – guitar, producer, guitars and keyboards engineer
- Ed Roth – keyboards
- Glenn Letsch – bass
- Denny Carmassi – drums

Additional musicians

- Edgar Winter – saxophone on tracks 3 and 4
- Jim Gammon – trumpet on tracks 3 and 4
- Marc Bonilla – horn arrangements on tracks 3 and 4
- Lisa Battle – background vocals on track 8
- Jean-Michel Byron – background vocals on tracks 2 and 8
- Michele Montrose – percussion on track 7, background vocals on track 9, artwork

Production

- Troy Lucketta – basic tracks engineer
- Andy Martin, David Culiner – assistant engineers
- Michael Scott – mixing
- Steve Hall – mastering at Future Disc, Hollywood
