= The Diva Station =

Studio album by Ronnie Montrose
- Released: 1990
- Genre: Instrumental Rock, Hard rock
- Length: 38:32
- Label: Enigma ( U.S.A.) / Roadrunner Records (EU)
- Producer: Ronnie Montrose

Ronnie Montrose chronology
The Speed of Sound (1988)	The Diva Station (1990)	Mutatis Mutandis (1991)

The Diva Station is a mix of instrumental rock music with three songs with vocals. Former Gamma vocalist Davey Pattison reunites for two songs with Ronnie Montrose.

== Track listing ==
1. "Sorcerer" (Ronnie Montrose) 6:24
2. "The Diva Station" (Montrose, Davey Pattison) 4:32
3. "Weirding Way" (Aynsley Dunbar, Davey Faragher, Montrose) 3:50
4. "New Kid in Town" (Montrose) 4:53
5. "Choke Canyon" (Dunbar, Faragher, Montrose) 3:31
6. "Little Demons" (Montrose) 5:20
7. "Stay With Me" (Jerry Ragovoy, George David Weiss) 4:24 - Lorraine Ellison cover
8. "Quid Pro Quo" (Montrose) 3:55
9. "High and Dry" (Montrose) 4:45
10. "Solitaire" (Montrose) 2:12

== Personnel ==
- Ronnie Montrose – electric guitar, acoustic guitar, mandocello, vocal effects
- Gary Hull - keyboards
- Davey Faragher– bass guitar
- Aynsley Dunbar – drums

== Additional personnel ==
- Davey Pattison: vocals on "The Diva Station" and "Stay With Me"
- Boris – bass guitar and vocals on "New Kid in Town"
- Steve Bellino - drums on "New Kid in Town" and "Weirding Way"

== Production ==
- Produced by Ronnie Montrose
- Engineered by Ronnie Montrose and Roger Wiersema
