= Glenn Letsch =

- Born: June 23, 1949 (age 77)
- Genres: Hard rock, instrumental rock
- Occupation: Musician
- Instrument: Bass guitar
- Website: glennletsch.com

Glenn Letsch (born June 23, 1949) is an American bass guitarist. He was in a Los Angeles band with Mitchell Froom called "Bullet Park" . After Ronnie Montrose produced their demo, he asked Letsch to join his band Gamma, where Letsch became friends with singer Davey Pattison. When Gamma disbanded in 1982, Pattison became Robin Trower's principal vocalist and Letsch continued with several of Ronnie Montrose projects and session work including playing bass on Sims computer games. He joined Trower's touring band in 2008 reuniting with Pattison.

== Discography ==
- Gamma - Gamma 2 (1980)
- Gamma - Gamma 3 (1982)
- Montrose - Mean (1987)
- Various Artists (Ronnie Montrose) - Guitar Speak (1988) "Blood Alley 152"
- Ronnie Montrose - The Speed Of Sound (1988)
- New Frontier - New Frontier (1988)
- Jonathan Cain - Back to the Innocence (1995)
- Gamma - Gamma 4 (2000)
- Guitar Shorty - I Go Wild! (2001)
- Johnny Colla - Lucky Devil (2003)
- Journey "Eclipse" 2010
- Glenn Letsch & Friends - "Funky Business" (2015)
- Robin Trower "Come And Find Me" (2025)
