= Warner Bros. Presents Montrose! =

Studio album by Montrose
- Released: 26 September 1975
- Studio: The Record Plant, Los Angeles and Sausalito, California
- Genre: Hard rock; heavy metal
- Length: 34:00
- Label: Warner Bros.
- Producer: Ronnie Montrose

Montrose chronology
Paper Money (1974)	Warner Bros. Presents Montrose! (1975)	Jump on It (1976)

Singles from Warner Bros. Presents Montrose!
- 1. "Matriarch" Released: September 1975

Professional ratings
Review scores
Source	Rating
AllMusic	4/5 stars
Collector's Guide to Heavy Metal	6/10

Warner Bros. Presents Montrose! is the third studio album by American hard rock band Montrose, released on Warner Bros. Records on 26 September 1975.

It is the first Montrose album released after the departure of singer Sammy Hagar and also the first not produced by Ted Templeman. Bob James, an unknown vocalist and songwriter from the South Bay area of Los Angeles who had been singing in a Montrose cover band, was chosen as Hagar's successor in early 1975. Another newcomer from Los Angeles, Jim Alcivar, joined the band on keyboards, making this the first Montrose album to feature a keyboardist as a full member of the band. At this juncture guitarist band leader Ronnie Montrose parted ways with Ted Templeman and chose to self-produce the album.

In 1971, singer-songwriter Kendell Kardt, formerly of the band Rig, recorded a solo album, Buddy Bolden, featuring guests Jerry Garcia and Ronnie Montrose, both of whom played on the songs "Buddy Bolden" and "Black Train". "Black Train" was written by Kardt about the heroin-overdose death of an unnamed friend of Rig guitarist Arthur Richards. The original Kendell Kardt version of the song has a Country & Western feel with Garcia on pedal steel guitar and Montrose on lead guitar and Hawaiian lap steel. A shakeup at Capitol resulted in Kardt's contract being dropped and the album being shelved. Ronnie Montrose's motivation for choosing to unearth the unreleased track for a more aggressive reinterpretation may have stemmed from the guitarist's vehement personal anti-drug/anti-alcohol stance at the time, exemplified by his insistence that all Montrose band members abide by a strict policy of drug and alcohol-free performances.

The album achieved the second highest chart position of the four Montrose releases, reaching No. 79 in the Billboard 200. It was critically praised and also noted for its movie-poster cover art, giving the impression that Warner Bros. Records was presenting a rock band like a big budget Hollywood production.

== Track listing ==
Credits adapted from the album liner notes.

Side one
No.	Title	Writer(s)	Length
1.	"Matriarch"	Jim Alcivar, Denny Carmassi, Alan Fitzgerald, Bob James, Ronnie Montrose	4:33
2.	"All I Need"	Alcivar, Carmassi, Fitzgerald, James, Montrose	4:21
3.	"Twenty Flight Rock" (Eddie Cochran cover)	Eddie Cochran, Ned Fairchild	2:43
4.	"Whaler"	Alcivar, Carmassi, Fitzgerald, James, Montrose	6:54

Side two
No.	Title	Writer(s)	Length
5.	"Dancin' Feet"	Montrose, James	4:05
6.	"O Lucky Man!"	Alan Price	3:11
7.	"One and a Half"	Montrose	1:36
8.	"Clown Woman"	Montrose	4:21
9.	"Black Train"	Kendell Kardt, Arthur Richards, Martin Fried	4:34

== Personnel ==
Montrose

- Bob James – lead vocals
- Ronnie Montrose – guitar, vocals, producer
- Jim Alcivar – keyboards
- Alan Fitzgerald – bass
- Denny Carmassi – drums

Additional musicians

- Novi Novog – viola (Track 4)

Production

- Charles Faris – engineer
- John Henning – associate engineer

== Covers ==
- British metal band Avenger covered the song "Matriarch" for their 1984 release "Blood Sports".

== Charts ==
Chart (1975)	Peak position
Swedish Albums (Sverigetopplistan)	40
US Billboard 200	79

== Other sources ==
- Montrose; "Warner Bros. Presents... Montrose!" liner notes; Warner Bros. Records 1975
