= Mean (album) =

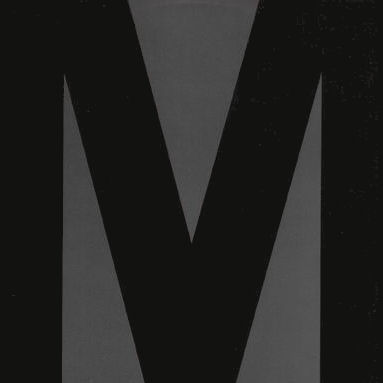

Studio album by Montrose
- Released: 1987
- Studio: The Music Annex, Menlo Park, California
- Genre: Hard rock, glam metal
- Length: 37:50
- Label: Enigma
- Producer: Ronnie Montrose

Montrose chronology
Jump On It (1976)	Mean (1987)

Ronnie Montrose chronology
Territory (1986)	Mean (1987)	The Speed Of Sound (1988)

Professional ratings
Review scores
Source	Rating
AllMusic	2/5 stars
Collector's Guide to Heavy Metal	6/10
Kerrang!	4/5 stars

Mean is the fifth and final album by American hard rock band Montrose, released in 1987. It has much more of a glam metal sound than previous Montrose albums. It was the lowest-charting release on Montrose's career, reaching No. 165 on the Billboard 200 in June 1987.

According to Ronnie Montrose, singer Johnny Edwards and drummer James Kottak were still officially in the band Buster Brown at the time of the recording of Mean. They later played together in the first line-up of the band Wild Horses.

Guitarist Ronnie Montrose and bassist Glenn Letsch played together in the band Gamma both before, and after, this album.

The song "M for Machine" was written for the film RoboCop but not used in it.

Drummer James Kottak went on to join the original line-up of hard rock/glam metal band Kingdom Come, remaining with that band during their most commercially successful period, prior to reconnecting with Edwards in Wild Horses. He would later rejoin renown hard rock band Scorpions in 1996, remaining with the group until his eventual firing in 2016, reportedly due to his struggle with alcoholism. After leaving Wild Horses, Edwards became the frontman for Foreigner on their 1991 album, Unusual Heat.

== Track listing ==
1. "Don't Damage the Rock" (Ronnie Montrose) – 5:06
2. "Game of Love" (Clint Ballard Jr. / Wayne Fontana and The Mindbenders cover) – 2:57
3. "Pass It On" (Montrose, Johnny Edwards, James Kottak) – 3:37
4. "Hard Headed Woman" (Montrose) – 3:50
5. "M for Machine" (Montrose) – 3:59
6. "Ready, Willing, and Able" (Montrose) – 4:19
7. "Man of the Hour" (Montrose) – 4:23
8. "Flesh and Blood" (Montrose, Edwards, Kottak) – 4:36
9. "Stand" (Montrose) – 4:46

== Personnel ==
- Johnny Edwards – vocals
- Ronnie Montrose – guitars, producer
- Glenn Letsch – bass guitar
- James Kottak – drums

Production

- Roger Wiersema – engineer
- John Francombe – additional engineering
- Eddy Schreyer – mastering at Capitol Studios
- Marc Bonilla – cover design

== Charts ==
Chart (1987)	Peak position
US Billboard 200	165

== Other sources ==
- Montrose; "Mean" liner notes; Enigma Records 1987
