= Gamma 3 =

Studio album by Gamma
- Released: February 1982
- Studio: The Automatt, San Francisco, California, U.S.A.
- Length: 38:02
- Label: Elektra
- Producer: Ronnie Montrose

Gamma chronology
Gamma 2 (1980)	Gamma 3 (1982)	Gamma 4 (2000)

Ronnie Montrose chronology
Gamma 2 (1980)	Gamma 3 (1982)	Territory (1986)

Professional ratings
Review scores
Source	Rating
AllMusic	3/5 stars
Collector's Guide to Heavy Metal	7/10

Gamma 3 is the third studio album released by the rock band Gamma. It was released in 1982.

== Track listing ==
All songs by Ronnie Montrose, Mitchell Froom and Jerry Stahl, except where indicated.

Side one

1. "What's Gone Is Gone" – 5:30
2. "Right the First Time" – 3:47
3. "Moving Violation" (Montrose, Froom, Stahl, Denny Carmassi) – 3:36
4. "Mobile Devotion" – 6:34

Side two

1. "Stranger" (Froom, Stahl) – 3:00
2. "Condition Yellow" (Montrose, Froom, Carmassi) – 4:08
3. "Modern Girl" – 3:35
4. "No Way Out" – 4:05
5. "Third Degree" – 3:47

== Personnel ==
All credits adapted from the original release.

- Davey Pattison – vocals
- Ronnie Montrose – guitar, producer
- Mitchell Froom – keyboards
- Glenn Letsch – bass guitar
- Denny Carmassi – drums

== Production ==
- Jim Gaines – engineer
- Dave Frazer, Maureen Droney, Wayne Lewis, Ken Kessie – assistant engineers
- Bobby Hata, Donn Landee – mastering at Amigo Studios, Los Angeles
