= Ronnie Montrose =

American guitarist (1947–2012)

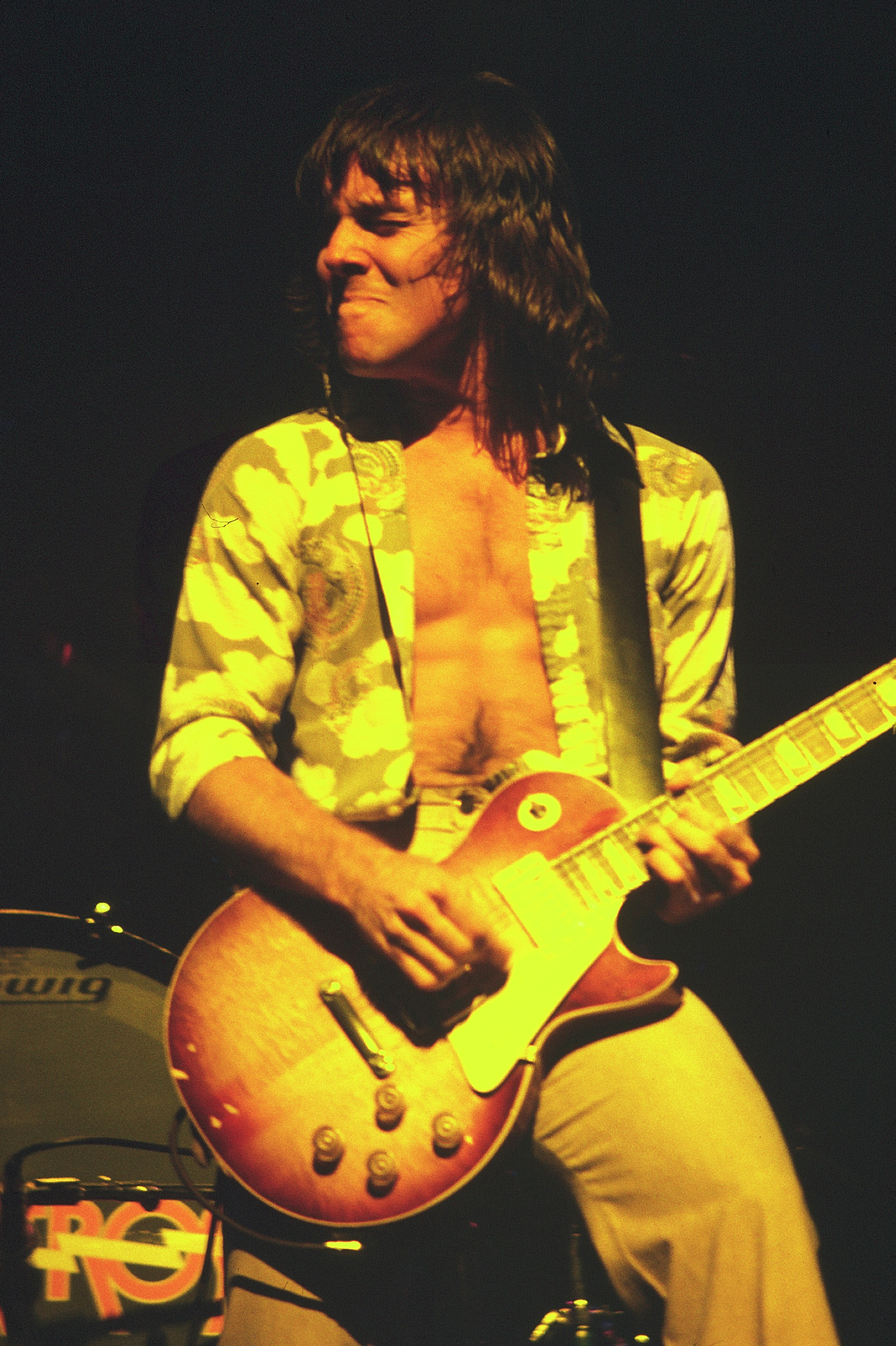
- Montrose in 1974

Background information
- Born: Ronald Douglas Montrose; November 29, 1947; San Francisco, California, U.S.
- Died: March 3, 2012 (aged 64) Brisbane, California, U.S.
- Genres: Hard rock, heavy metal, instrumental rock, jazz fusion, blues rock
- Occupation: Musician
- Instrument: Guitar
- Years active: 1968–2012

Ronald Douglas Montrose (November 29, 1947 – March 3, 2012) was an American guitarist who founded and led the rock bands Montrose and Gamma. He also performed and did session work with a variety of musicians, including Van Morrison, Herbie Hancock, Beaver & Krause, Boz Scaggs, Edgar Winter, Gary Wright, The Beau Brummels, Dan Hartman, Tony Williams, The Neville Brothers, Marc Bonilla and Sammy Hagar.

Montrose's 1973 debut album has often been cited as "America's answer to Led Zeppelin". Ronnie Montrose is often recognized as one of the most influential guitarists in early hard rock.

== Early years ==
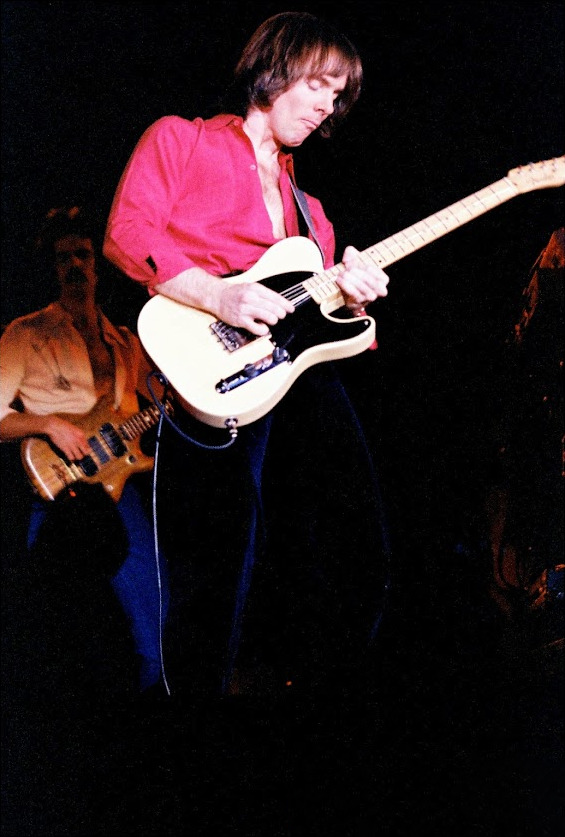
Montrose in 1978

Montrose was born in San Francisco, California. When he was a toddler, his parents moved back to his mother's home state of Colorado (his father was from Bertrand, Nebraska, and his mother was from Golden, Colorado). He spent most of his younger years in Denver until he ran away at about 16 years old to pursue his musical career. Ultimately he spent most of his life in the San Francisco Bay area.

== Sawbuck ==
In late 1968, Montrose joined the San Francisco–based band Sawbuck, whose lineup at the time included Mojo Collins (vocals, guitar), Starr Donaldson (guitar), Chuck Ruff (drums), and Bill Church (bass).^{[1]} Sawbuck was signed to Fillmore Records, the label co‑owned by producer David Rubinson and promoter Bill Graham, and performed throughout 1969–1970, opening for major acts.^{[2]} The group was active locally, performing around the Bay Area while Montrose also worked independently as a carpenter. Through that work he met Bill Graham and producer David Rubinson, after being hired to build office partitions and sheetrock at their Fillmore Records offices. Montrose developed a working relationship with Rubinson, who allowed Sawbuck to rehearse in the Fillmore offices at night in exchange for Montrose’s carpentry work.

By late 1970, Sawbuck began recording what would become their self‑titled debut album. During these sessions Rubinson's secretary arranged an audition for Montrose with Van Morrison, who was assembling a new band for Tupelo Honey. Both Montrose and Church left Sawbuck to join Morrison, but each returned briefly as guest musicians during the completion of the Sawbuck album.^{[3]} They appear on two tracks each, with one track featuring both of them together.^{[4]}

The album was released in 1972 with the final credited lineup of Mojo Collins, Starr Donaldson, Chuck Ruff, Nineyear Wooldridge (bass), and Stephen Hatley (keyboards).^{[5]}

== Van Morrison ==
In 1971, Montrose auditioned for Van Morrison at the Lion Share club in San Anselmo, California. He later recalled that David Rubinson’s secretary phoned him unexpectedly and asked whether he would like to “play with Van Morrison,” which Montrose initially misunderstood as an invitation for his band to open a show. At the audition he found a dozen guitarists waiting, but said he felt a sudden certainty that he would be hired. When Morrison asked whether he knew “Domino,” Montrose improvised through the song, after which Morrison immediately offered him the job.

Montrose said Morrison reacted warmly when he mentioned he was from Denver, explaining that as a child in Belfast he had been fascinated with American “cowboy” imagery brought home by his father, a sailor or Merchant Marine.Montrose later recounted that while they were touring with the J. Geils Band, J. Geils told him that Morrison had phoned and said, “Well, I got a cowboy,” pleased to have an American Western‑type guitarist in the lineup.

The album opens with "Wild Night", a hybrid of R&B, soul and country music influences, which uses a moderate 4/4 time signature and features the lead guitar playing of Ronnie Montrose. The song's intro was created, according to Montrose, when "One afternoon I was messing around with what is now the intro on the record, [Van] stopped me and ... said ' ... that thing you just played ... that's the intro, don't forget it'". This guitar-driven intro in Clinton Heylin's opinion made it one of Morrison's most memorable singles. "Wild Night", which has been described by biographer Ken Brooks as "a great start to the album", was first recorded after the Astral Weeks sessions in Autumn 1968 and was re-recorded numerous times before its eventual release on Tupelo Honey. Morrison recalled during an interview that the song was originally "a much slower number, but when we got to fooling around with it in the studio, we ended up doing it in a faster tempo."

According to WOAS – Woodshed of American Sound, a regional music‑history publication, tension developed between Montrose and Morrison during touring for Tupelo Honey. Bassist Bill Church recalled that the relationship soured after he and Montrose stepped to the front of the stage during a performance at UCLA’s Pauley Pavilion on October 16, 1971, an action Morrison strongly disapproved of; Church’s misstep was excused because he was taking pain medication, but Montrose’s was not. The article also reports the long‑circulated account that Morrison eventually told Montrose, “When the bus stops, somebody’s gotta get off,” effectively dismissing him mid‑tour.

Montrose and Church also played on “Listen to the Lion,” recorded during the Tupelo Honey sessions and later released on Morrison’s Saint Dominic's Preview (1972). Two additional tracks from the same sessions featuring Montrose, “Ordinary People” and “Wonderful Remark,” remained unreleased until they appeared on the archival compilation The Philosopher's Stone (1999).^{[6]}

== Edgar Winter Group ==
Montrose played briefly with Boz Scaggs before joining the newly formed Edgar Winter Group in 1972. Winter assembled the lineup of Dan Hartman, Ronnie Montrose, and Chuck Ruff in late 1972 for what became the band’s breakthrough album, They Only Come Out at Night. Montrose’s recruitment of Ruff effectively ended the remnants of Sawbuck, the band they had both previously played in.

Released in November 1972, They Only Come Out at Night peaked at No. 3 on the Billboard 200 and remained on the charts for 80 weeks. The album produced two major hits: the No. 1 instrumental "Frankenstein" and "Free Ride", written and sung by Hartman.

Montrose recorded electric guitar, acoustic 12‑string, and mandolin on the album.

According to drummer Chuck Ruff, Montrose left the Edgar Winter Group shortly afterward due to conflicts with manager Steve Paul: “Ronnie Montrose left the band because he and Steve Paul did not get along at all. They were gonna call a big meeting and fire him. I told Ronnie, so before they could do that he quit.”

The later single version of “Free Ride,” released in August 1973 and running 3:05, features a noticeably different guitar solo. Ruff stated that the band “re‑recorded ‘Free Ride’ two or three times with Rick Derringer and Jerry Weems,” resulting in the revised single mix.

== Montrose ==
=== Montrose ===
After leaving the Edgar Winter Group, Montrose began forming a new hard‑rock band built around his guitar style. Sammy Hagar later recalled that he had recently seen the Edgar Winter Group in concert and was struck by Montrose’s playing, prompting him to seek out Montrose when he heard he had left the band. Hagar arrived at Montrose’s home with a guitar and several original songs, including “Make It Last” and “Bad Motor Scooter,” both of which were incorporated into the group’s early repertoire. Montrose and Hagar wrote “Space Station No. 5” during their first meeting, and Montrose introduced Hagar to material he had already begun developing, such as “Rock the Nation.” Drummer Denny Carmassi had recently met Hagar and invited him to join his band Thunderstick, after singing on three songs for them, a Bay Area hard‑rock group whose lineup included guitarist Jim Alcivar, later a member of Montrose. Instead of joining Thunderstick, Hagar brought Carmassi to Montrose, and the two musicians immediately fit the direction Montrose envisioned. After auditioning bass players, Bill Church joined the group, completing the original lineup.

Over time, Montrose (1973) came to be recognized as a foundational American hard‑rock album whose concise, high‑energy guitar style helped define the genre’s direction in the mid‑1970s. Critics and musicians have frequently cited it as a precursor to Van Halen’s debut. Eddie Van Halen’s blues‑based riffs and tight arrangements drew clear parallels to Ronnie Montrose’s work on tracks such as “Rock the Nation” and “Bad Motor Scooter.”< Van Halen covered “Make It Last” in their early club performances and later hired the same producer, Ted Templeman, and engineer, Donn Landee, for their 1978 debut album; music journalist Matthew Wilkening wrote in Ultimate Classic Rock that the Montrose record “clearly had an impact on Hagar’s future Van Halen bandmates.”

Members of Iron Maiden have cited Montrose as one of the early hard‑rock groups that inspired them during the formative years of British heavy metal. The album has also been described by Sammy Hagar and others as an important influence on Def Leppard, with the first Montrose record frequently cited by band members as part of the hard‑rock lineage that shaped their early sound.

=== Paper Money ===
Montrose’s second album, Paper Money (1974), marked a shift toward more varied textures and arrangements. While still rooted in hard rock, the record incorporated more melodic and experimental elements, signaling Ronnie Montrose’s interest in expanding beyond the straightforward attack of the debut. The sessions also brought the band’s first lineup change, with Bill Church replaced by Alan Fitzgerald on bass. Creative clashes over musical direction emerged during this period: Sammy Hagar favored continuing the high‑energy hard‑rock style of the first album, while Montrose pushed for broader arrangements and stylistic experimentation — an approach that would become a recurring theme throughout his career. The album includes hard‑rock tracks such as “I Got the Fire,” “Spaceage Sacrifice,” and the title song, alongside more stylistically varied material like the reworking of the Rolling Stones’ “Connection” and the instrumental “Starliner,” which reflected Montrose’s interest in expanding the band’s musical palette.

The track “We’re Going Home” reflected the growing creative tension within the band. The song was written by Ronnie Montrose, and Sammy Hagar declined to sing it, leading Montrose to perform the lead vocal himself; Hagar and drummer Denny Carmassi contributed background vocals. The recording emphasized Montrose’s interest in more atmospheric and textural approaches, featuring sustained guitar tones and a mellotron part performed by arranger Nick DeCaro, elements that contrasted with the more direct hard‑rock style favored by Hagar.

The CD liner notes for Paper Money later claimed that Montrose had been invited to join Mott the Hoople as lead guitarist after leaving the Edgar Winter Group, but Montrose stated that this was only a rumor. Around the same time, Montrose guested on Gary Wright’s song “Power of Love” from The Dream Weaver (1975). The track’s credits list Montrose as the sole guitarist on an album otherwise dominated by keyboard instrumentation, underscoring his versatility outside the Montrose band format and his growing interest in broader musical textures. After conflicts arose between Sammy Hagar and Ronnie Montrose during a European tour, Hagar was dismissed from the band in 1975, bringing the group’s original lineup to a close and leading Montrose to rebuild the band for the next album.

=== Warner Bros. Presents Montrose! ===
Following Hagar’s dismissal in 1975, Montrose rebuilt the band with vocalist Bob James, a singer he discovered while James was working in a record store. James auditioned for the group in producer Ted Templeman’s office at Warner Bros., with Montrose accompanying him on acoustic guitar. Montrose also added multi‑instrumentalist Jim Alcivar, whose earlier work with drummer Denny Carmassi in Carmassi’s pre‑Montrose band Thunderstick gave the pair an established musical rapport and broadened the group’s musical range. Alcivar later recalled that his long association with Montrose began when Carmassi and Sammy Hagar recommended him to Ronnie during the Thunderstick period, leading to his audition and eventual role in the band. The resulting album, Warner Bros. Presents Montrose! (1975), blended straight‑ahead rockers such as “Matriarch,” “Dancin’ Feet,” and Kendell Kardt’s “Black Train”—a song Montrose had played on four years earlier—with more stylistically varied material. “Whaler” introduced an acoustic, atmospheric direction featuring Novi Novog’s viola, echoing textures heard in early alternate versions of “Space Station #5,” while the acoustic instrumental “One and a Half,” which Montrose had performed for years and recorded in an extended live version, marked another departure from the band’s earlier sound. Montrose’s guitar remained central, but the album reflected a move toward more layered arrangements and underscored his interest in steering the band’s direction rather than repeating the formula of the debut.

=== Jump on It ===
Jump on It (1976) continued Montrose’s collaboration with vocalist Bob James and keyboardist Jim Alcivar, pushing further into melodic and rhythmic experimentation. Produced by Jack Douglas and engineered by Jay Messina, the album adopted a cleaner, more spacious sound, with Ronnie Montrose exploring a wider range of guitar tones and textures. The record featured an unusual low‑end configuration: Randy Jo Hobbs played bass on three tracks, while Jim Alcivar supplied the remaining bass parts via keyboard bass, a setup that carried over into the band’s bass‑less tour. The album also included two compositions by Dan Hartman, the proggy instrumental “Tuft‑Sedge,” and string arrangements by Alcivar’s father, Bob Alcivar, whose orchestra appears on the record. Although not a commercial breakthrough, Jump on It demonstrated Montrose’s continued stylistic evolution beyond the hard‑rock template of the debut. Its release was accompanied by a notorious Hipgnosis cover design, often cited as one of the most polarizing in the band’s catalog — even shocking the band themselves.

=== Open Fire ===
After four vocal‑based Montrose albums, Ronnie shifted direction and released the instrumental solo album Open Fire (1978), produced by Edgar Winter. The record marked a significant departure from the hard‑rock framework of Montrose, drawing on jazz‑fusion, classical, acoustic, and cinematic influences. Montrose had already hinted at this broader musical vocabulary on tracks such as “Whaler,” “One and a Half,” “Tuft‑Sedge,” and “Merry‑Go‑Round,” but Open Fire made those tendencies explicit. The album reunited him with Winter and featured contributions from Montrose alumni Jim Alcivar and Alan Fitzgerald, along with drummer Rick Shlosser who Montrose played with in Van Morrison's band. Its orchestral passages, synthesizer textures, and acoustic compositions highlighted Montrose’s expanding compositional interests and technical range, presenting a side of his musicianship not fully explored within the Montrose band. The album’s reception also led to Montrose performing with Tony Williams’ All‑Stars in Tokyo later that year, underscoring his credibility within jazz‑fusion circles.

== Gamma ==
=== Gamma 1 ===
Following Open Fire, Montrose formed Gamma with Scottish vocalist Davey Pattison, recommended by Robin Trower’s bassist/vocalist James Dewar, who had described Pattison as “one of the best undiscovered vocalists around.” Pattison’s recruitment followed a demo he had recorded with Matthew Fisher, which Dewar and drummer Bill Lordan passed to Bill Graham’s office; Montrose responded strongly to the material and invited Pattison to the United States to front the new band. Prior to Gamma, Pattison had worked in clubs in Scotland before gaining attention through the 1977 demo.

The debut lineup reunited several Montrose alumni: Jim Alcivar appeared on his fourth consecutive Montrose‑related project, and Alan Fitzgerald returned on bass, joined by drummer Skip Gillette. Produced by Ken Scott, Gamma 1 blended hard rock with progressive and AOR elements, emphasizing Alcivar’s synthesizer textures and Pattison’s melodic vocal style. The album showcased a broad range of Montrose’s musical vocabulary, including hard‑rock tracks, acoustic passages, and instrumental and progressive elements. Songs such as “Razor King” and “Fight to the Finish” highlighted Montrose’s lead‑guitar intensity, while the re‑imagined versions of “Wish I Was” and "I'm Alive" demonstrated his approach to reinterpretation, incorporating new arrangements and extended soloing. The album’s stylistic variety distinguished it from the more streamlined hard‑rock direction the band would pursue on subsequent releases.

Pattison’s first performance with Gamma was a high‑profile opening slot for Santana before approximately 25,000 people, a dramatic shift from the club circuit he had worked in Scotland. The band quickly moved into larger venues, reflecting Montrose’s intention to position Gamma as a more modern, arena‑ready hard‑rock act.

=== Gamma 2 ===
Following the release of Gamma 1, Montrose reconfigured the rhythm section for Gamma 2, bringing in former Montrose drummer Denny Carmassi and bassist Glenn Letsch. Letsch had previously worked with producer Mitchell Froom in the Los Angeles band Bullet Park, whose demo Montrose produced; at the conclusion of those sessions, Montrose invited both Letsch and Carmassi to join Gamma. The new lineup gave the band a tighter, more forceful foundation and contributed to the album’s heavier, more hard‑rock‑driven sound.

Gamma 2 leaned further into aggressive guitar‑driven material while retaining the progressive edge of the debut. Tracks such as “Mean Streak” and “Voyager” became signature pieces for the band, with “Voyager” later noted by Pattison as one of Gamma’s standout songs. Across their first three albums, Gamma sold approximately one million units, reflecting the band’s growing presence on the late‑1970s and early‑1980s hard‑rock circuit.

Carmassi described the Gamma 2 period as an exciting time of musical exploration. Although he did not consciously alter his drumming approach, he noted that the band was increasingly curious about emerging European electronic and synth‑driven styles, citing influences such as Ultravox, Alan Parsons Project, and Ideal (German band). While Carmassi still played acoustic drums on the album, the band’s interest in electronic textures shaped the album’s more modern production aesthetic. His playing provided a heavier, more assertive rhythmic foundation that contrasted with the more atmospheric approach of Gamma 1.

The Gamma 2 lineup quickly became one of the band’s most cohesive configurations, combining Montrose’s sharpened guitar attack, Alcivar’s synthesizer work, Pattison’s increasingly confident vocals, and the new rhythm section’s power and precision. The album’s success helped position Gamma for larger venues and tours, setting the stage for the stylistic shift that would define Gamma 3.

In between Gamma 2 and Gamma 3, Montrose composed and performed the soundtrack for the 1980 Canadian skiing comedy Powderheads, collaborating with keyboardist Mitchell Froom, drummer Denny Carmassi, and bassist Jimmy Haslip. Froom had already been connected to the Gamma circle through Bullet Park, a Los Angeles band he co‑led with future Gamma bassist Glenn Letsch, whose demo Montrose had produced prior to recruiting Letsch and Carmassi for Gamma 2. The Powderheads project marked Montrose’s first direct musical collaboration with Froom and introduced the more atmospheric, synth‑textured approach that would shape Gamma 3. The film starred David Ferry and Catherine Mary Stewart.

=== Gamma 3 ===
For Gamma 3, keyboardist Mitchell Froom replaced Jim Alcivar, bringing a more textural and experimental sensibility to the band’s sound. The new lineup—Davey Pattison, Ronnie Montrose, Denny Carmassi, Glenn Letsch, and Froom—shifted toward a polished, early‑1980s production style that incorporated synthesizers, layered arrangements, and a stronger new‑wave influence. Building on the atmospheric ideas explored during the Powderheads soundtrack sessions, the album moved away from the harder, guitar‑driven approach of Gamma 2 and adopted a more contemporary, keyboard‑forward direction.

During the album’s development, Pattison—who had contributed lyrics on earlier Gamma material—was no longer involved in the band’s songwriting. Several of the album’s lyrics were instead written by Jerry Stahl, later known for his work as a novelist and screenwriter. Although Pattison was disappointed by the change, he continued to deliver his vocals with the same conviction and intensity that had characterized the first two Gamma albums.

Tracks such as “Right the First Time” reflected the band’s more commercial orientation, with the song reaching the Top 10 on Billboard’s rock chart. During the Gamma 3 era, the band performed at major stadium events, including Day on the Green IV in 1981 before an estimated 80,000 fans, and toured with acts such as AC/DC, ZZ Top, Journey, and Foreigner, underscoring their presence on the early‑1980s hard‑rock circuit.

Gamma 3 marked the end of the band’s original run. After the album’s release, Montrose returned to solo work, Carmassi joined Heart, Froom moved into production and session work, and Pattison began a long‑running collaboration with Robin Trower. Gamma would not reconvene until the early 1990s for a brief reunion and later for Gamma 4 in 2000.

== Solo and Later Years ==
In 1983, Montrose played lead guitar on the song "(She Is a) Telepath" from Paul Kantner's album Planet Earth Rock and Roll Orchestra although he was not a member of the original PERRO.

In 1985, he joined Seattle's Rail (winners of MTV's first Basement Tapes video competition) for several months. He was looking for a new band and one of Rail's guitarists, Rick Knotts had recently left. Billed as 'Rail featuring Montrose' or 'Ronnie & Rail', they played a set of half Rail favorites and half Montrose songs ("Rock Candy", "Rock the Nation", "Matriarch" and Gamma's remake of Thunderclap Newman's "Something in the Air"). At the end of the tour, there was an amicable split.

Montrose continued to record through the 1980s and 1990s, releasing solo albums including The Speed of Sound (1988), Music from Here (1994), and Bearings (2000), as well as another Montrose album titled Mean (1987) and a fourth Gamma album Gamma 4 (2000). Montrose recorded a rousing interpretation of the Beatles song "Love You To", that included a rare Montrose vocal performance, on his album Territory in 1986.

Montrose appeared on Sammy Hagar's solo album Marching to Mars (1997) along with original Montrose members bassist Bill Church and drummer Denny Carmassi on the song "Leaving the Warmth of the Womb". The original Montrose lineup also reformed to play as a special guest at several Hagar concerts in summer 2004 and 2005. Montrose also performed regularly from 2001 until 2011 with a Montrose lineup featuring Keith St. John on lead vocals and a rotating cast of veteran hard rock players on bass and drums. In 2011, Montrose formed the 'Ronnie Montrose Band' with Randy Scoles on vocals, Dan McNay on bass, and Steve Brown on drums, playing music from his entire career, including both Montrose and Gamma songs. This lineup was captured in his final released work, the concert DVD Ronnie Montrose: Live at the Uptown.

During his 2009 tour, Montrose revealed that he had fought prostate cancer for the previous two years but was healthy once again; he continued to tour until his death in 2012.

== Death ==
Montrose died from a self-inflicted gunshot wound on March 3, 2012. His death was initially assumed by some media outlets to be the result of prostate cancer. However, the San Mateo County Coroner's Office released a report that confirmed the guitarist had shot himself.

The toxicology reported a significantly high blood alcohol content of 0.31 percent at the time of death. The deaths of Montrose's uncle and of his beloved pet dog Lola, both in early 2012, had worsened what Guitar Player magazine called a "clinical depression that plagued him since he was a toddler."

Montrose is survived by his wife, two children and five grandchildren.

== Discography ==
=== Solo ===
- Open Fire (1978)
- Territory (1986)
- The Speed of Sound (1988)
- The Diva Station (1990)
- Mutatis Mutandis (1991)
- Music from Here (1994)
- Mr. Bones (1996)
- Roll Over and Play Live (Live album) (1999)
- Bearings (1999)
- 10x10 (2017)

=== with Montrose ===
- Montrose (1973)
- Paper Money (1974)
- Warner Brothers Presents Montrose! (1975)
- Jump on It (1976)
- Mean (1987)
- The Very Best of Montrose (2000)

=== with Gamma ===
- Gamma 1 (1979)
- Gamma 2 (1980)
- Gamma 3 (1982)
- The Best of Gamma (1992)
- Gamma 4 (2000)

=== with Van Morrison ===
- Van Morrison – Tupelo Honey (1971)

=== with Edgar Winter Group ===
- Edgar Winter Group – They Only Come Out at Night (1972)

=== Session work ===
- Herbie Hancock – Mwandishi (1971) "Ostinato (Suite for Angela)"
- Victoria (Domalgoski) – Victoria (1971) "Song About the Sun", "We've Got Ways to Keep High" with Herbie Hancock
- Beaver & Krause – Gandharva (1971) "Saga of the Blue Beaver"
- Van Morrison – The Philosopher's Stone (1971) "Ordinary People" & "Wonderful Remark" [compilation released 1999]
- Kendell Kardt – Buddy Bolden (unreleased solo LP 1971) "Buddy Bolden" & "Black Train" with Jerry Garcia
- Boz Scaggs – Unreleased Muscle Shoals tapes (1971)
- Sawbuck – Sawbuck (1972) "Believe" and "Lovin' Man"
- Van Morrison – Saint Dominic's Preview (1972) "Listen to the Lion" – recorded 1971 during Tupelo Honey sessions
- Kathi McDonald – Insane Asylum (1973) "(Love Is Like a) Heat Wave", "Heartbreak Hotel" & "If You Need Me"
- Gary Wright – The Dream Weaver (1975) "Power of Love"
- The Beau Brummels – The Beau Brummels (1975) "Down to the Bottom"
- Dan Hartman – Images (1976) "The Party's in the Back Room" & "High Sign"
- Hoodoo Rhythm Devils – Safe in Their Homes (1976) "Safe in Their Homes" & "Teach Your Daughter"
- Tony Williams – The Joy of Flying (1978) "Open Fire"
- The Tony Williams All Stars - Live In Tokyo 1978
- Nicolette Larson – In the Nick of Time (1979) "Just in the Nick of Time"
- Lauren Wood – Lauren Wood (1979) "Dirty Work" (Steely Dan cover)
- Earth Quake – Two Years in a Padded Cell (1979) "Trouble"
- Jamie Sheriff – No Heroes (1980) "Soldier"
- Paul Kantner – Planet Earth Rock and Roll Orchestra (1983) "(She Is a) Telepath"
- The Neville Brothers – Uptown (1987) "Whatever It Takes"
- Various Artists – Guitar Speak (1988) "Blood Alley 152"
- Heist – High Heel Heaven (1989) "She Needs Love", "Tighter"
- Various Artists – Born to Ski soundtrack (1991) "Born to Ski"
- Marc Bonilla – EE Ticket (1991) "Razorback"
- Marc Bonilla – American Matador (1993) "I Am the Walrus" (instrumental cover)
- Anti-M – Positively Negative (1995) "Security", "Television", "Lonely" and "Iniki"
- Glenn Hughes – Addiction (1996) "Justified Man"
- Edgar Winter – The Real Deal (1996) "Eye of the Storm"
- Kevin Crider – Signatures (1996) "Stratovision"
- Sammy Hagar – Marching to Mars (1997) "Leaving the Warmth of the Womb"
- C.J. Hutchins – Out of These Hands (1998) "Cannonball" (bass), "Cross-Leg", "Rock Me to Sleep", "Out of These Hands", "What Went Wrong" (bass) & "Circus Song"
- David Culiner – Implode (1999) "Human Shield"
- Jerry Jennings – Shortcut to the Center (1999) [Released in 2005] "Observation" (acoustic), "One Blue Lady" (lead)
- Bruce Turgon – Outside Looking In (2005) "Outside Looking In"
- Various Artists – The Songs of Pink Floyd (2002) "Another Brick in the Wall (Pt. 2)"
- Various Artists – Secondhand Smoke – A Tribute to Frank Marino (2005) "Try for Freedom"

=== Production ===
- Mitchell Froom – Key of Cool (1984)
- Jeff Berlin / Vox Humana – Champion (1985) background vocals
- Wrath – Nothing to Fear (1987)
- Heathen – Breaking the Silence (1987)
- C.J. Hutchins – Out of These Hands (1998) guitar, bass
- Jerry Jennings – Shortcut to the Center (1999) [Released in 2005]
- Y&T – Unearthed, Vol. 2 (2005) composer

== Soundtracks ==
- Powderheads (1980)
- Mr. Bones (1996)

Mr. Bones

Soundtrack album by Ronnie Montrose
- Released: November 29, 1996
- Genre: Instrumental rock
- Label: SegaSoft
- Producer: Ronnie Montrose

Ronnie Montrose chronology
| Music from Here (1994) | Mr. Bones (1996) | Roll Over and Play Live (1999) |

=== Mr. Bones details ===
The soundtrack accompanied the 1996 SegaSoft video game Mr. Bones. The music was conceived and produced by Ronnie Montrose and released on a separate Mr. Bones CD. Release date: November 29, 1996 and Label: SegaSoft. All music by Ronnie Montrose except Dry Moat, The Valley and Mausoleum by Ronnie Montrose and Jim Hedges. All lyrics by Merle Kessler. Engineered by Gordon Lyon.

- Ronnie Montrose - Electric & Acoustic Guitars, Bass, Keyboards, Penny whistle, Little People Vocals
- Myron Dove - Bass
- Billy Johnson - Drums
- Joe Heinemann - Keyboards
- Michele Graybeal - Percussion, Snare & Brushes, Little People Vocals
- Spencer Nilsen - Organ on "Who's Out There?"
- Fitz Houston - Vocal on "In This World"

== Tracks ==
1. Manifesto 6:56
2. Bones Is Bones 4:38
3. Who's Out There? 3:14
4. Don't Think Play 3:54
5. The Village 3:55
6. In This World 3:41
7. The First Thing 5:05
8. Dry Moat 6:00
9. The Valley 4:31
10. By the Way 4:47
11. Red to Blue 5:27
12. Shadow Monster 3:35
13. Mausoleum 4:33
14. Icy Lake 3:06
15. The Last Word 5:37

Total Running Time: 68:59
