= Jump on It (Montrose album) =

Studio album by Montrose
- Released: September 1976
- Genre: Rock, hard rock
- Length: 32:28
- Label: Warner Bros.
- Producer: Jack Douglas

Montrose chronology
Warner Bros. Presents Montrose! (1975)	Jump on It (1976)	Mean (1987)

Ronnie Montrose chronology
Warner Brothers Presents Montrose! (1975)	Jump on It (1976)	Open Fire (1978)

Singles from Jump on It
- 1. "Music Man" Released: September 1976; 2. "Jump on It" Released: November 1976 (Japan); 3. "Let's Go" Released: November 1976 (US)

Professional ratings
Review scores
Source	Rating
AllMusic	3/5 stars
Collector's Guide to Heavy Metal	5/10

Jump on It is the fourth studio album by American hard rock band Montrose.

It is the second Montrose album to feature singer Bob James and keyboardist Jim Alcivar, and features bass guitarist Randy Jo Hobbs on three songs. The remainder of the bass parts were supplied by Jim Alcivar via the keyboard and there was no bass guitarist on the Jump on It tour. Jack Douglas produced the album.

Jump on It was the band's third highest-charting release, reaching No. 118 on the Billboard 200 in October 1976.

== Track listing ==
Side one

1. "Let's Go" (Bob James, Ronnie Montrose, Jim Alcivar, Denny Carmassi) – 4:15
2. "What Are You Waitin' For?" (Dan Hartman) – 3:48
3. "Tuft-Sedge" (Montrose) – 2:50
4. "Music Man" (Montrose) – 4:16

Side two

1. "Jump on It" (James, Montrose, Alcivar, Carmassi) – 3:37
2. "Rich Man" (Hartman) – 4:24
3. "Crazy for You" (Montrose, Ilene "Chunky" Rappaport) – 3:26
4. "Merry-Go-Round" (Montrose) – 5:38

== Personnel ==
Montrose

- Bob James – vocals
- Ronnie Montrose – guitars
- Jim Alcivar – keyboards, keybass
- Denny Carmassi – drums

Additional musicians

- Randy Jo Hobbs – bass on "Let's Go", "Jump On It" and "Rich Man"
- Bob Alcivar – string arrangements

Production

- Jack Douglas – producer
- Jay Messina – engineer
- Rod O'Brien – additional recording & engineering
- Hipgnosis – cover design and photography

== Charts ==
Chart (1976)	Peak position
US Billboard 200	118

== Other sources ==
- Montrose; Jump On It liner notes; Warner Brothers Records 1976
- Ronnie Montrose; The Very Best of Montrose liner notes; Rhino Records 2000
