= Jim Alcivar =

American keyboardist

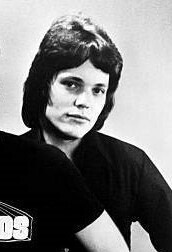
- Alcivar in 1976

Background information
- Genre: Hard rock
- Occupation: Musician
- Instrument: Keyboards
- Formerly of: Montrose, Gamma

Jim Alcivar is an American keyboardist, synthesizer player, and sound engineer best known for his work with guitarist Ronnie Montrose in the bands Montrose and Gamma, and on Montrose’s first solo album Open Fire (1978). Alcivar’s playing helped define the transition of Montrose’s sound from hard rock toward more progressive and keyboard‑driven arrangements in the mid‑1970s.

== Early life and background ==
Alcivar was born in Renton, Washington, and grew up traveling with his parents, both jazz musicians. His father, Bob Alcivar, is a composer, arranger, and producer known for his work with The Fifth Dimension, The Association, and other vocal groups. Jim began on trumpet before switching to guitar and later keyboards, influenced by bands such as Vanilla Fudge, Iron Butterfly, and Led Zeppelin.

== Career ==
Before joining Montrose, Alcivar played in several California‑based bands, including Thunderstick, with drummer Denny Carmassi and bassist Jim Keylor. During that period, Sammy Hagar recorded vocals on several Thunderstick demos. Alcivar later recalled that Carmassi and Hagar recommended him to Montrose, leading to his audition and eventual role in the band.

He joined Montrose for Warner Brothers Presents Montrose! (1975) and Jump on It (1976), contributing keyboards and arrangements that expanded the group’s sound beyond its earlier guitar‑centric style. Alcivar also appeared on Montrose’s instrumental solo album Open Fire (1978), produced by Edgar Winter.

In 1979, Alcivar became a founding member of Gamma, Montrose’s new project blending hard rock with progressive and AOR influences. He performed on Gamma 1 (1979) and Gamma 2 (1980), providing synthesizer textures that helped define the band’s distinctive sound.

== Later work ==
After leaving Gamma, Alcivar continued studio and live work as a keyboardist and engineer. His early recordings with Thunderstick were later rediscovered and released online, featuring Sammy Hagar on vocals. Alcivar has also collaborated with his father on orchestral arrangements and continues to work in music production.

== Legacy ==
Alcivar’s contributions to Montrose and Gamma are regarded as pivotal in broadening Ronnie Montrose’s musical range from straightforward hard rock to more layered, progressive compositions. His work on Warner Bros. Presents Montrose! and Gamma 1 is frequently cited by fans and historians as key examples of Montrose’s evolving sound.

== Discography – Musician ==
- Montrose – Warner Brothers Presents... Montrose! (1975)
- Montrose – Jump on It (1976)
- Ronnie Montrose – Open Fire (1978)
- 1994: – Please Stand By (1979)
- Gamma – Gamma 1 (1979)
- Gamma – Gamma 2 (1980)

== Discography – Engineer ==
- Dead Kennedys – Give Me Convenience or Give Me Death (1987)
- Dead Kennedys – Live at the Deaf Club 1979 (2004)
