= Montrose (album) =

Studio album by Montrose
- Released: October 17, 1973
- Studios: Warner Bros. Recording Studios and Sunset Sound Recorders, Hollywood, California, Wally Heider Studios, San Francisco, California (guitar overdubs)
- Genres: Hard rock; heavy metal; blues rock
- Length: 32:22
- Label: Warner Bros.
- Producers: Montrose; Ted Templeman

Montrose chronology
Montrose (1973)	Paper Money (1974)

Ronnie Montrose chronology
They Only Come Out at Night (1972)	Montrose (1973)	Paper Money (1974)

Sammy Hagar chronology
Montrose (1973)	Paper Money (1974)

Singles from Montrose
- 1. "Rock the Nation" Released: January 1974; 2. "Space Station #5" Released: March 1974; 3. "Bad Motor Scooter" Released: 19 April 1974 (UK)

Professional ratings
Review scores
Source	Rating
AllMusic	4/5 stars
Classic Rock	8/10 stars
Collector's Guide to Heavy Metal	10/10
Record Collector	4/5 stars

Montrose is the debut studio album by American hard rock band Montrose, released in October 1973 by Warner Bros. It was produced by Ted Templeman. Montrose marks the career debut of singer-guitarist Sammy Hagar, who would later achieve significant success as a solo artist and as a member of Van Halen.

== Background ==
Montrose was guitarist Ronnie Montrose's first record leading his own band, after having done session work for various musicians, including Van Morrison, Herbie Hancock and Edgar Winter. The band included Bill Church (bass) who Ronnie played with in the band Sawbuck and with Van Morrison, Denny Carmassi (drums),and a then-unknown Sammy Hagar (vocals). Ronnie Montrose mainly used a Gibson Les Paul, a Fender Bandmaster amp, and a Big Muff fuzzbox by Electro-Harmonix in recording the album.

== Music ==
Classic Rock Magazine described the album's sound as "primeval pandemonium topped with liberal amounts of cool American gloss."

== Reception ==
The album was not successful upon release, peaking at No. 133 on the US Billboard 200. "Rock Candy" and "Bad Motor Scooter" were the only tracks to receive radio airplay. It has been reported that the band's label, Warner Bros., did not know how to market Montrose, already having the Doobie Brothers and Deep Purple to cover the rock genres, saw the band as something of a redundancy on their roster of artists. In 1974, the album was issued in Europe via Germany under the title Rock the Nation. This release duplicated the track listing of the U.S. album, but had a different front sleeve image, replacing the band's photo with that of a large-busted blonde girl sporting a pink see-through blouse. Montrose eventually proved to be an international sleeper hit, selling in excess of one million copies and attaining platinum status in 1986.

== Legacy ==
Some critics have arguably labeled it the "first American heavy metal album". Often being cited as "America's answer to Led Zeppelin", it is held to be influential among hard rock and heavy metal musicians. Classic Rock Magazine named the album as one of the "albums that built heavy metal" in 2021. Staff writers for the site wrote: "Even today, nearly 50 years down the line, the record’s power remains undiminished. If a band came along sounding like this in 2020, they’d be hailed as the saviours of rock’n’roll. Yes, Montrose is that timeless."

Montrose was voted as the 4th best Metal Album of All Time by Kerrang! magazine in 1989. That same year, Hit Parader named it within the Top 100 Heavy Metal albums of all time.

English heavy metal band Iron Maiden recorded "Space Station #5" as B-side of the single "Be Quick or Be Dead" in 1992.

"Make It Last" was covered by Van Halen during their early years (available on Van Halen bootlegs). "Make It Last" and "Rock Candy" were also covered by Van Halen when Sammy Hagar joined the band.

== Track listing ==
Credits adapted from the album liner notes.

Side one
No.	Title	Writer(s)	Length
1.	"Rock the Nation"	Ronnie Montrose	3:03
2.	"Bad Motor Scooter"	Sammy Hagar	3:41
3.	"Space Station #5"	Hagar; Montrose	5:18
4.	"I Don't Want It"	Hagar; Montrose	2:58

Side two
No.	Title	Writer(s)	Length
5.	"Good Rockin' Tonight"	Roy Brown	2:59
6.	"Rock Candy"	Denny Carmassi; Bill Church; Hagar; Montrose	5:05
7.	"One Thing on My Mind"	Hagar; Montrose; J. Sanchez	3:41
8.	"Make It Last"	Hagar	5:31
Total length:			32:22

=== Montrose (2017 re-release bonus) ===
On October 13, 2017, Rhino Entertainment released a Deluxe Edition. The first six tracks are demos from the album's recordings. The remaining are from the group's debut performance, a session on KSAN radio from the Record Plant in Sausalito, California on April 21, 1973.

Deluxe Edition disc 2
No.	Title	Writer(s)	Length
1.	"One Thing on My Mind" (demo)	Hagar; Montrose; Sanchez	3:40
2.	"Shoot Us Down" (demo)	Montrose	4:32
3.	"Rock Candy" (demo)	Carmassi; Church; Hagar; Montrose	3:55
4.	"Good Rockin' Tonight" (demo)	Brown	3:20
5.	"I Don't Want It" (demo)	Hagar; Montrose	3:07
6.	"Make It Last" (demo)	Hagar	4:06
7.	"Intro by Tom Donahue"		0:54
8.	"Good Rockin' Tonight" (KSAN session)	Brown	3:55
9.	"Rock Candy" (KSAN session)	Carmassi; Church; Hagar; Montrose	4:46
10.	"Bad Motor Scooter" (KSAN session)	Hagar	5:01
11.	"Shoot Us Down" (KSAN session)	Montrose	4:54
12.	"One Thing on My Mind" (KSAN session)	Hagar; Montrose; Sanchez	3:27
13.	"Rock The Nation" (KSAN session)	Montrose	4:55
14.	"Make It Last" (KSAN session)	Hagar	6:04
15.	"You're Out of Time" (KSAN session)	Montrose	3:35
16.	"Roll Over Beethoven" (KSAN session)	Chuck Berry	4:53
17.	"I Don't Want It" (KSAN session)	Hagar; Montrose	3:55

== Personnel ==
All credits adapted from the original release. Only the mastering credits are from the 2005 Audio Fidelity release.

=== Montrose ===
- Sammy Hagar – vocals
- Ronnie Montrose – guitar
- Bill Church – bass
- Denny Carmassi – drums

=== Production ===
- Ted Templeman – producer
- Donn Landee – engineer
- Stephen Jarvis – engineer (guitar overdubs)
- Steve Hoffman – mastering

== Charts ==
Chart (1973–74)	Peak position
UK Albums (Official Charts)	43
US Billboard 200	133

Chart (2017)	Peak position
UK Rock & Metal Albums (Official Charts)	28

== Certifications ==
Region	Certification	Certified units/sales
United States (RIAA)	Platinum	1,000,000^{^}
^{^} Shipments figures based on certification alone.
