= Bob James (rock singer) =

American singer (1952–2021)

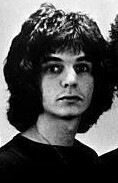
- James in 1976

Background information
- Born: Robert Dennis James; 1952; Struthers, Ohio, U.S.
- Origin: Los Angeles, California, U.S.
- Died: February 2021 (aged 68)
- Genres: Rock, hard rock
- Occupations: Singer, songwriter
- Formerly of: Montrose, Magnet, Swan

Robert Dennis James (1952 – February 2021) was an American singer best known for his work with the hard rock band Montrose.

== Biography ==
Born in Struthers, Ohio, James moved to the South Bay area of Los Angeles in 1963. His early bands The Symbols of Time, Shatterminx, and Swan included David Pack (Ambrosia), Joe Puerta (Ambrosia), Robert Fleischman (Journey), and Marc Droubay (Survivor). In early 1975 he was chosen by Ronnie Montrose as the replacement for vocalist Sammy Hagar in the band Montrose and is featured as lead vocalist and co-songwriter on the Montrose albums Warner Brothers Presents... Montrose! (1975) and Jump On It (1976).

After leaving Montrose in early 1977 he reunited with his pre-Montrose original band Swan who recorded demos at Capitol Records with Montrose engineer Charles Faris and performed live in the Los Angeles area. In 1978 he relocated to New York to join the Anglo-American group Magnet who were mentored by Danny Goldberg, Phil DeHaviland, Jerry Moss, and Peter Frampton. Magnet featured Frampton's former Humble Pie bandmate Jerry Shirley on drums, and released the album Worldwide Attraction on the A&M label in 1979. During this period James was approached by Aerosmith manager David Krebs as a possible replacement for Steven Tyler.

Circa 1981, following the dissolution of Magnet, James formed the Los Angeles–based group Private Army featuring former Cheap Trick member Pete Comita on guitar and the future Quiet Riot rhythm section of bassist Rudy Sarzo and drummer Frankie Banali. When Pete Comita left the band, Bob James replaced him with guitarist Peter Van Name. By early 1982 Private Army had disbanded and James relocated to Chicago to form 'USSA' with Private Army guitarist Pete Comita, future Ozzy Osbourne/Mötley Crüe drummer Randy Castillo and ex-Pezband guitarist Tommy Gawenda. His USSA-era composition "Reach Out" was recorded by Cheap Trick and appears on the 1981 Heavy Metal movie soundtrack.

By late 1982, he had left USSA and returned to Los Angeles where he remained active throughout the remainder of the 1980s and early 1990s as a songwriter and performer, before turning his focus to mechanical engineering, engineering management, and real estate investing. After nearly three decades of professional silence, in July 2013 James filmed a music video for his original composition "Diamond in the Rough", which can be seen on YouTube. His son Brendan Willing James (born 1979) is the bassist and vocalist with the band Grizfolk.

In early 2021, album format videos for "Dusk Summons the Sky" by Shatterminx and "The Lost Album" by Swan, showcasing James's pre and post Montrose recordings, were posted to YouTube.

James died in February 2021 at the age of 68.

== Discography ==
=== With Montrose ===
- Warner Bros. Presents (Montrose album) (1975)
- Jump On It (1976)

=== With Magnet ===
- Worldwide Attraction (1979)

== Other sources ==
- Montrose; Warner Bros. Presents liner notes; Warner Brothers Records 1975
- Montrose; Jump On It liner notes; Warner Brothers Records 1976
- Ronnie Montrose; The Very Best of Montrose liner notes; Rhino Records 2000
