= Ned Fairchild =

American songwriter

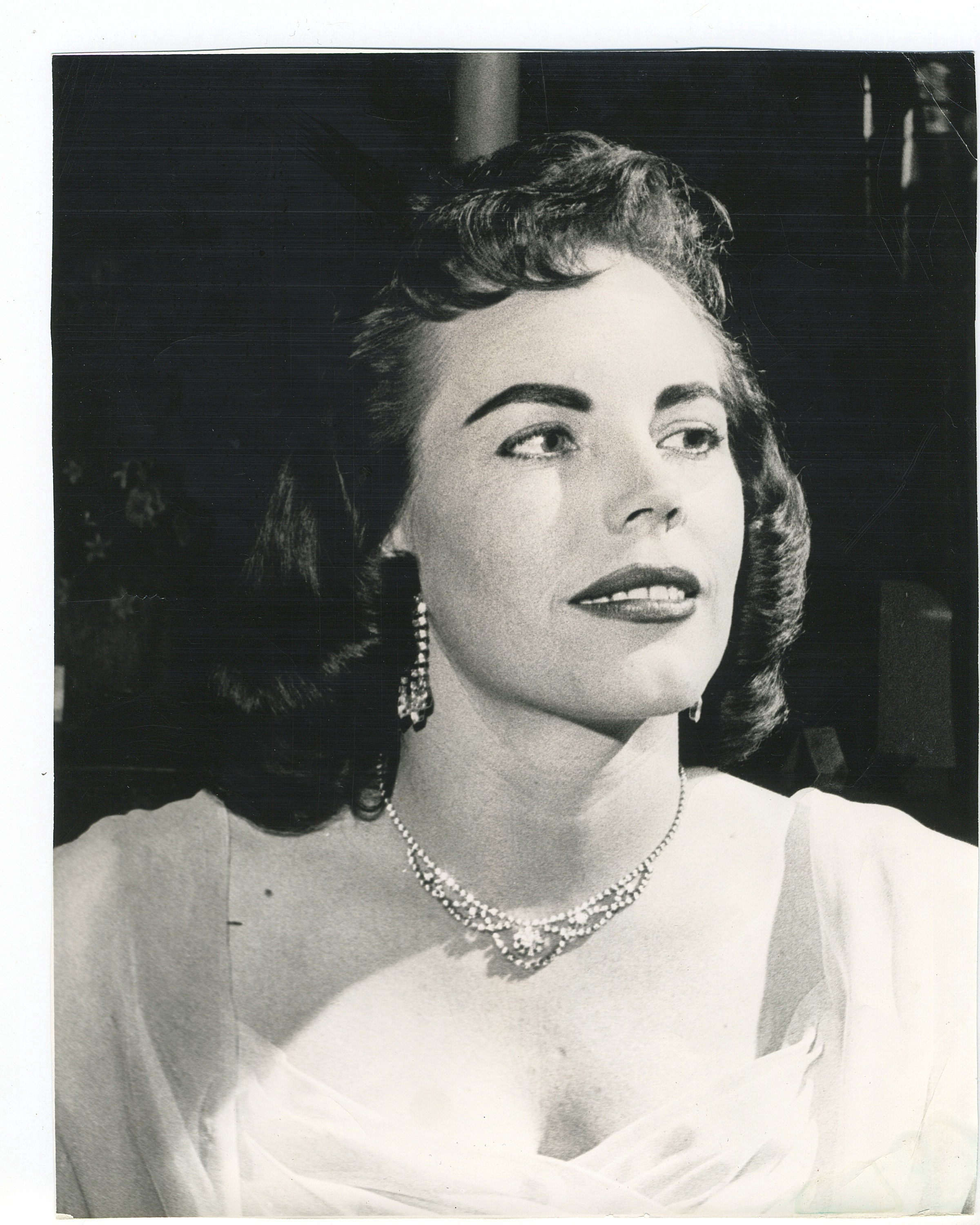
Publicity photo from her own collection of Nelda Fairchild, likely at the time performing as "Sunny Bingo"

Nelda "Ned" Fairchild (August 26, 1929 in Burley, Idaho - May 3, 2015) was an American songwriter. Her best known work is the 1957 rock'n'roll hit "Twenty Flight Rock", on which a co-writing credit was given to rock and roll pioneer Eddie Cochran. Paul McCartney and John Lennon have in different contexts said that McCartney was invited to join Lennon's band, The Quarrymen, because he knew both the chords and words to "Twenty Flight Rock", a much-admired staple of the bands forming in England at that time.

== Biography ==
=== Early life and career ===
Born Nelda Fairchild, she and her sister Teena (real name Ella) began performing at ages 4 and 5 as a sister act on radio shows.

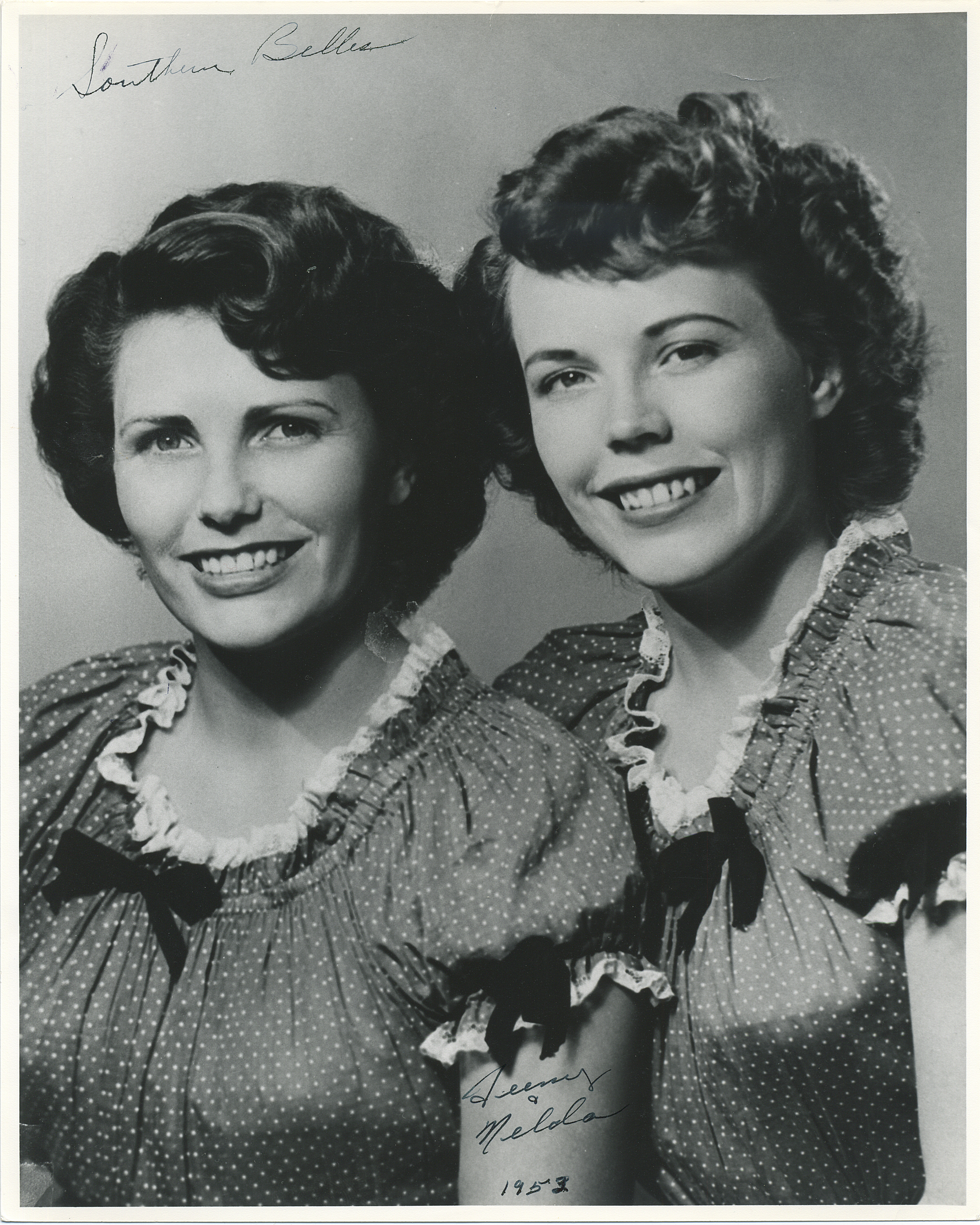

As teenagers living in Southern California, they worked regularly and were cast members on Burt "Foreman" Phillips' musical variety show in Compton, California. By the 1950s, they were appearing as The Southern Belles, appearing on Town Hall Party with Merle Travis and other early TV music stars. Travis introduced Nelda to the AMI president Irv Cross, who made her a staff writer, one of a very few women then on the writing staffs of music publishers. She variously wrote as Ned Fairchild and Sunny Bingo.

=== Twenty Flight Rock ===
It was at that time common for a star who recorded a song to take a co-writer credit. Originator of this thread, journalist Dean Miller, examined royalty statements at Fairchild's home in 2007 to confirm Fairchild was paid an undivided royalty on "Twenty Flight Rock", which supports her statements that Cochran's co-writing credit is not for authorship, but for covering the song.

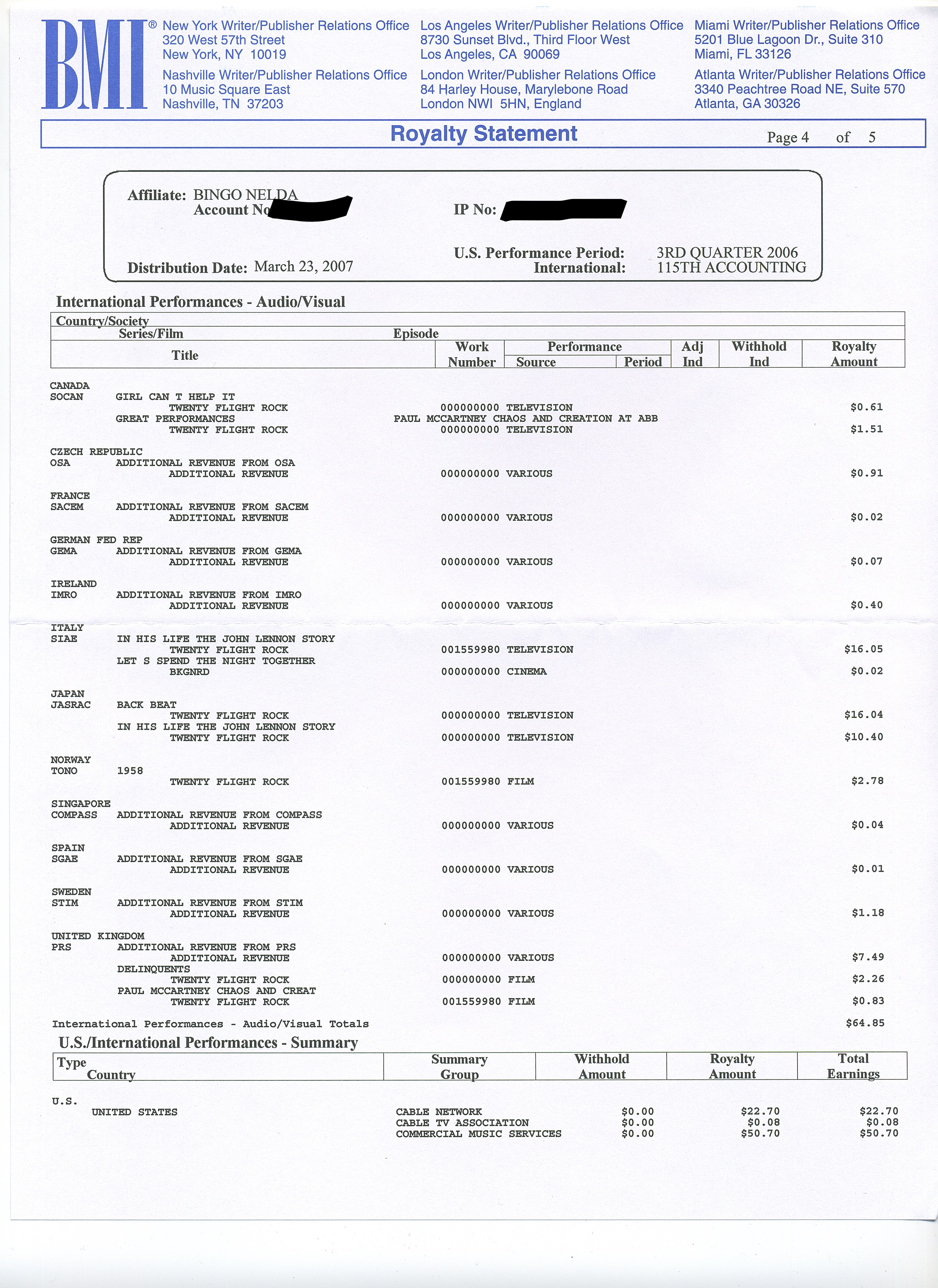
This BMI royalty statement is one example of several showing royalties paid, without division, to Fairchild for "Twenty Flight Rock"

Cochran's nephew, biographer Bobby Cochran, dismisses her as Irv Cross' mistress in Three Steps to Heaven: The Eddie Cochran Story, though without supporting documentation to substantiate the claim that Cross gave her credit as a gift. Notably, Cochran has no solo songwriting credits while Fairchild wrote and published multiple songs, some solo and some with co-writers. In "Chaos & Creation at Abbey Road", McCartney's 2005 bio/documentary, McCartney tells the story of auditioning on the song, which he credits with gaining him a spot in John Lennon's band, The Quarrymen. The song performed by Cochran was featured in "The Girl Can't Help It," a 1956 film featuring Jayne Mansfield.

=== Personal life ===
Her first marriage at age 15 in 1944 was to Jack B. Farnsworth. He fought in the South Pacific during World War II, was disabled by malaria, and came home a war hero. They divorced, leaving Nelda a single mother of a four-year-old son, Jack D. Farnsworth. She met and married Richard "Bing" Bingo in 1950. Together they had two children, Jill and Frank, and Nelda's song writing and poetry proliferated. She worked nearly continuously, often on the road selling her songs and singing in bars and lounges with a small band. Bing died in 2002. Her son, Jack, died in July 2011.

In 2006, she published the autobiographical book Sing or Cry: My Life in Verse. After the book was published she was diagnosed with Alzheimer's disease.

== Songs written by Ned Fairchild ==
- "Twenty Flight Rock" (Ned Fairchild/Eddie Cochran) co-written with and recorded by Eddie Cochran
- "Freddie the Little Fir Tree" (Ned Fairchild/Merle Travis) performed by Gene Autry
- "I Took Him From You" performed by the DeJohn Sisters
- "Too in Love" (Ned Fairchild/Merle Travis) performed by Hank Thompson
- "Since You Said Goodbye"
- "World Turning Blue" (performed by Sunny Bingo)
- "Wondering Where You Are Tonight" (performed by Sunny Bingo)
