= Davey Pattison =

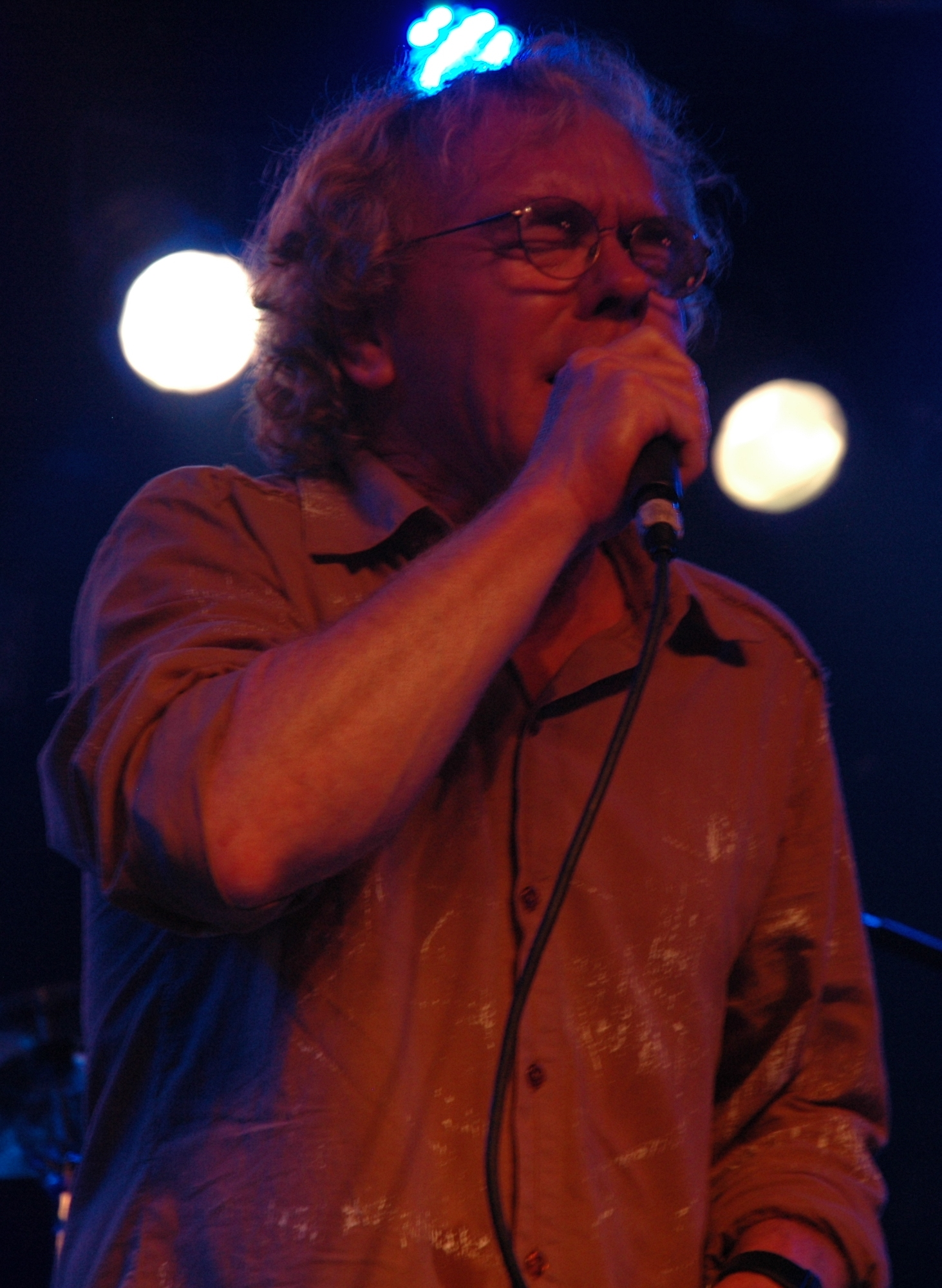
- Pattison performing in Fort Lauderdale, Florida, in January 2008

Background information
- Born: November 18, 1945 (age 80); Glasgow, Scotland
- Genres: Hard rock, blues-rock, heavy metal, blues, rhythm and blues
- Occupations: Singer-songwriter, musician
- Instruments: Vocals, guitar, piano, bass
- Years active: 1969–present
- Labels: Angel Air
- Formerly of: Gamma

Davey Pattison (born November 18, 1945, in Scotland) is a Scottish-American singer based in the San Francisco Bay Area. Pattison started his career in 1969, and it took off after arrival in the United States in 1979, on invitation from Bill Graham, to front the rock band Gamma, formed by Ronnie Montrose.

"I'd given up all hope of finding a quality singer for Gamma until I heard Davey Pattison", according to Montrose. In 1986, Pattison began singing for the first time with guitarist Robin Trower.

After several albums with Trower, Pattison rejoined Montrose in 1992. Since then, Pattison has performed as a solo artist and has also reunited with Trower for the Robin Trower Band's 2005 album, Another Days Blues.

In 2004, Pattison joined with legendary guitar player Michael Schenker to form the Schenker-Pattison Summit, along with Aynsley Dunbar, one of rock's most well known drummers and bassist Gunter Nezhoda to record The Endless Jam. They followed up with The Endless Jam Continues in 2005 with Tim Bogert on bass. Both albums contain only cover versions.

Pattison toured during the summer of 2008 and fall of 2010 in Europe with the Robin Trower Band, and toured the United States with Trower in 2011.

In 2013, Pattison re-formed Gamma with drummer Dan Buch (Butch), Van Spragins on bass, Tommy Merry on guitar and Brad Barth on keyboards. Pattison is performing hits from Gamma, Robin Tower and Schenker-Pattison Summit.

Pattison returned to Paisley, Scotland in 2021 due to health issues. Early in 2023 he formed The Davey Pattison Blues Band, consisting of Davey Pattison (vocals), Jim Keilt (guitar) (Middle of the Road, The Look, John Otway. Keilt recorded extensively throughout the UK and Europe. He currently hosts the longest running Blues Jam in Europe at the State Bar in Glasgow). Alan McAuley (Bass), Mikey Grant (Keyboards) and James (Papa Siz) Nevans (Drums), playing gigs all over Scotland and beyond.

== Personal life ==
Pattison previously lived in California, in a small town near San Francisco.

== Discography ==
- Kid Gloves – Kid Gloves, featuring former members of Peter Frampton's band, The Herd (1972)
- Gamma 1 (1979)
- Gamma 2 (1980)
- Tom Coster – T.C. (1981) (2 songs)
- Gamma 3 (1982)
- Robin Trower – Passion (1987)
- Robin Trower – Take What You Need (1988)
- Robin Trower – In the Line of Fire (1990)
- Ronnie Montrose – The Diva Station (1990)
- L.A. Blues Authority – L.A. Blues Authority (1992)
- Davey Pattison – Mississippi Nights (1999)
- Gamma 4 (2000)
- Original Cast – Leonardo: The Absolute Man (2001)
- Pete Sears – Long Haul (2001)
- Davey Pattison – Pictures (2003)
- Robin Trower – Living Out of Time (2003)
- Schenker-Pattison Summit – The Endless Jam (2004) with guitarist Michael Schenker
- Schenker-Pattison Summit – The Endless Jam Continues (2005)
- Robin Trower – Another Days Blues (2005)
- Robin Trower – Living Out of Time: Live (2005)
- Robin Trower – RT @ RO 08 (2009)
- Robin Trower – The Playful Heart (2010)
- Ronnie Montrose – 10x10 (2017)
