= Denny Carmassi =

American drummer

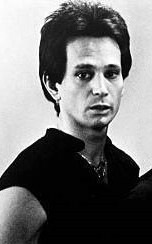
- Carmassi with Montrose in 1976

Background information
- Born: April 30, 1947 (age 79) or May 5, 1947 (age 79); Alameda County, California, U.S.
- Genres: Rock; hard rock
- Occupation: Drummer
- Years active: 1970–present
- Formerly of: Montrose; Gamma; Heart; Sammy Hagar; Ted Nugent; Coverdale/Page

Dennis Joseph "Denny" Carmassi (born 1947) is an American drummer notable for playing with many rock bands.

== Biography ==
Carmassi was born into a family of drummers; his father, his uncle, and his brother each played the drums. Occasionally, they allowed young Denny to sit in with them. His father exposed him to great drummers, including Buddy Rich, Jimmy Vincent and Richard Goldberg. Denny listened to the radio and discovered such drummers as Earl Palmer, D.J. Fontana, Al Jackson Jr., Clyde Stubblefield, Jabo Starks, Dino Danelli, Ginger Baker, Mitch Mitchell, John Bonham, and Tony Williams. Out of high school, he started playing topless clubs in San Francisco. He joined a band called Sweet Linda Divine and recorded an album in New York on Columbia, produced by Al Kooper, but before long they parted ways. Carmassi went on to work with several local bands in the San Francisco Bay Area and began working with Montrose and Sammy Hagar in the 1970s.

Carmassi was a member of the first four line-ups of the band Montrose. After Montrose, he played with his former Montrose bandmate Sammy Hagar as a solo artist, and with his former Montrose bandmates Ronnie Montrose and Jim Alcivar in the band Gamma. He played with Heart, Coverdale-Page, Whitesnake, and David Coverdale as a solo artist.

== Discography ==
=== By date ===
1970s

- Sweet Linda Divine – Sweet Linda Divine (1970)
- Montrose – Montrose (1973)
- Montrose – Paper Money (1974)
- Montrose – Warner Brothers Presents... Montrose! (1975)
- Montrose – Jump On It (1976)
- Sammy Hagar – Musical Chairs (1977)
- Sammy Hagar – All Night Long (1978)
- Randy Meisner – Randy Meisner (1978)
- St. Paradise – St. Paradise (1979)

1980s

- Gamma – Gamma 2 (1980)
- Gamma – Gamma 3 (1982)
- Randy Meisner – Randy Meisner (1982)
- Heart – Passionworks (1983)
- Kim Carnes – Café Racers (1983)
- Mitchell Froom – Key of Cool (1984)
- Al Stewart – Russians & Americans (1984)
- Joe Walsh – The Confessor (1985)
- Heart – Heart (1985)
- Stevie Nicks – Rock a Little (1985)
- .38 Special – Strength in Numbers (1986)
- Heart – Bad Animals (1987)
- Whitesnake – Here I Go Again 87 – Radio-Edit Single (1987)
- Cinderella – Long Cold Winter (1988)
- Russell Hitchcock – Russell Hitchcock (1988)

1990s

- Heart – Brigade (1990)
- Heart – Rock the House Live! (1991)
- Coverdale-Page – Coverdale and Page (1993)
- Heart – Desire Walks On (1993)
- Randy Newman – Faust (1995)
- Ted Nugent – Spirit of the Wild (1995)
- Sammy Hagar – Marching to Mars (1997)
- Whitesnake – Restless Heart (1997)

2000s

- David Coverdale – Into the light (2000)
- Trip to Heaven – 707 (2000)
- Gamma – Gamma 4 (2000)
- Bruce Turgon – Outside Looking In (2006)
- Mercy (featuring Lynda Morrison) – "Bad Habit" (2014)

=== By Band / Artist-surname ===
- Kim Carnes – Café Racers (1983)
- Cinderella – Long Cold Winter (1988)
- Coverdale-Page – Coverdale/Page (1993)
- David Coverdale – Into the light (2000)
- Mitchell Froom – Key of Cool (1984)
- Gamma – Gamma 2 (1980)
- Gamma – Gamma 3 (1982)
- Gamma – Gamma 4 (2000)
- Sammy Hagar – Musical Chairs (1977)
- Sammy Hagar – All Night Long (1978)
- Sammy Hagar – Marching to Mars (1997)
- Heart – Passionworks (1983)
- Heart – Heart (1985)
- Heart – Bad Animals (1987)
- Heart – Brigade (1990)
- Heart – Rock the House Live! (1991)
- Heart – Desire Walks On (1993)
- Russell Hitchcock – Russell Hitchcock (1988)
- Randy Meisner – Randy Meisner (1978)
- Randy Meisner – Randy Meisner (1982)
- Montrose – Montrose (1973)
- Montrose – Paper Money (1974)
- Montrose – Warner Brothers Presents... Montrose! (1975)
- Montrose – Jump On It (1976)
- MFLD (featuring Lynda Morrison) – Bad Habit (2014)
- Stevie Nicks – Rock a Little (1985)
- Randy Newman – Faust (1995)
- Ted Nugent – Spirit of the Wild (1995)
- St. Paradise – St. Paradise (1979)
- Al Stewart – Russians & Americans (1984)
- Sweet Linda Divine – Sweet Linda Divine (1970)
- Trip to Heaven – 707 (2000)
- Bruce Turgon – Outside Looking In (2006)
- Joe Walsh – The Confessor (1985)
- Whitesnake – Here I Go Again 87 – Radio-Edit Single (1987)
- Whitesnake – Restless Heart (1997)
- .38 Special – Strength in Numbers (1986)
