= Gamma 1 =

Studio album by Gamma
- Released: July 1979
- Studio: Chateau Recorders, North Hollywood, California
- Genre: Hard rock
- Length: 37:10
- Label: Elektra
- Producer: Ken Scott

Gamma chronology
Gamma 1 (1979)	Gamma 2 (1980)

Ronnie Montrose chronology
Open Fire (1978)	Gamma 1 (1978)	Gamma 2 (1980)

Professional ratings
Review scores
Source	Rating
AllMusic	3/5 stars
Collector's Guide to Heavy Metal	10/10
Record Mirror	5/5 stars

Gamma 1, released in 1979, is Gamma's debut album. It reached No. 131 on the Billboard Album charts, totalling seventeen weeks on the survey. "I'm Alive" reached No. 60 on the Billboard singles charts. "I'm Alive" is a cover of The Hollies song from 1965.

== Track listing ==
Credits adapted from the original LP releases.

Side one

1. "Thunder and Lightning" (Ronnie Montrose, Davey Pattison) – 4:37
2. "I'm Alive" (Clint Ballard Jr.) – 3:18
3. "Razor King" (Montrose, Pattison) – 5:53
4. "No Tears" (Pattison) – 4:53

Side two

1. "Solar Heat" (Montrose) – 3:09
2. "Ready for Action" (Montrose) – 3:39
3. "Wish I Was" (Mickey Newbury) – 5:16
4. "Fight to the Finish" (Montrose, Jim Alcivar) – 6:25

== Personnel ==
- Davey Pattison – vocals
- Ronnie Montrose – guitar
- Jim Alcivar – synthesizer
- Alan Fitzgerald – bass guitar
- Skip Gillette – drums

== Production ==
- Ken Scott – producer, engineer
- Brian Leshon, Phil Jost – assistant engineers
- Bernie Grundman – mastering at A&M Studios, Los Angeles
