= Alan Fitzgerald =

American musician

- Born: July 16, 1949 (age 77); United States
- Occupation: Musician
- Instruments: Bass guitar; keyboards; synthesizers; piano

Francis Alan "Fitz" Fitzgerald (born July 16, 1949) is an American rock musician. A multi-instrumentalist, he is best known as the second bassist of Montrose and as keyboardist for Night Ranger. He has also performed with Gamma, and former Montrose bandmate Sammy Hagar. Fitzgerald also worked as an offstage keyboard player with Van Halen, during their concerts from 1991 until 2004, 2007, 2012.

== Discography ==
=== Montrose ===
- Paper Money (1974)
- Warner Bros. Presents Montrose! (1975)

=== Sammy Hagar ===
- Nine on a Ten Scale (1976)
- Sammy Hagar (1977)
- All Night Long Live (1978)

=== Ronnie Montrose ===
- Open Fire (1978)

=== Gamma ===
- Gamma 1 (1979)

=== Night Ranger ===
- Dawn Patrol (1982)
- Midnight Madness (1983)
- 7 Wishes (1985)
- Big Life (1987)
- Neverland (1997)
- Seven (1998)

=== Alliance ===
- Alliance (1997)
- Missing Piece (1999)
- Destination Known (2007)

=== Van Halen ===
- Live: Right Here, Right Now (1993)
- Live from the Tokyo Dome (2015)
