= Sammy Hagar discography =

Discography of American musician

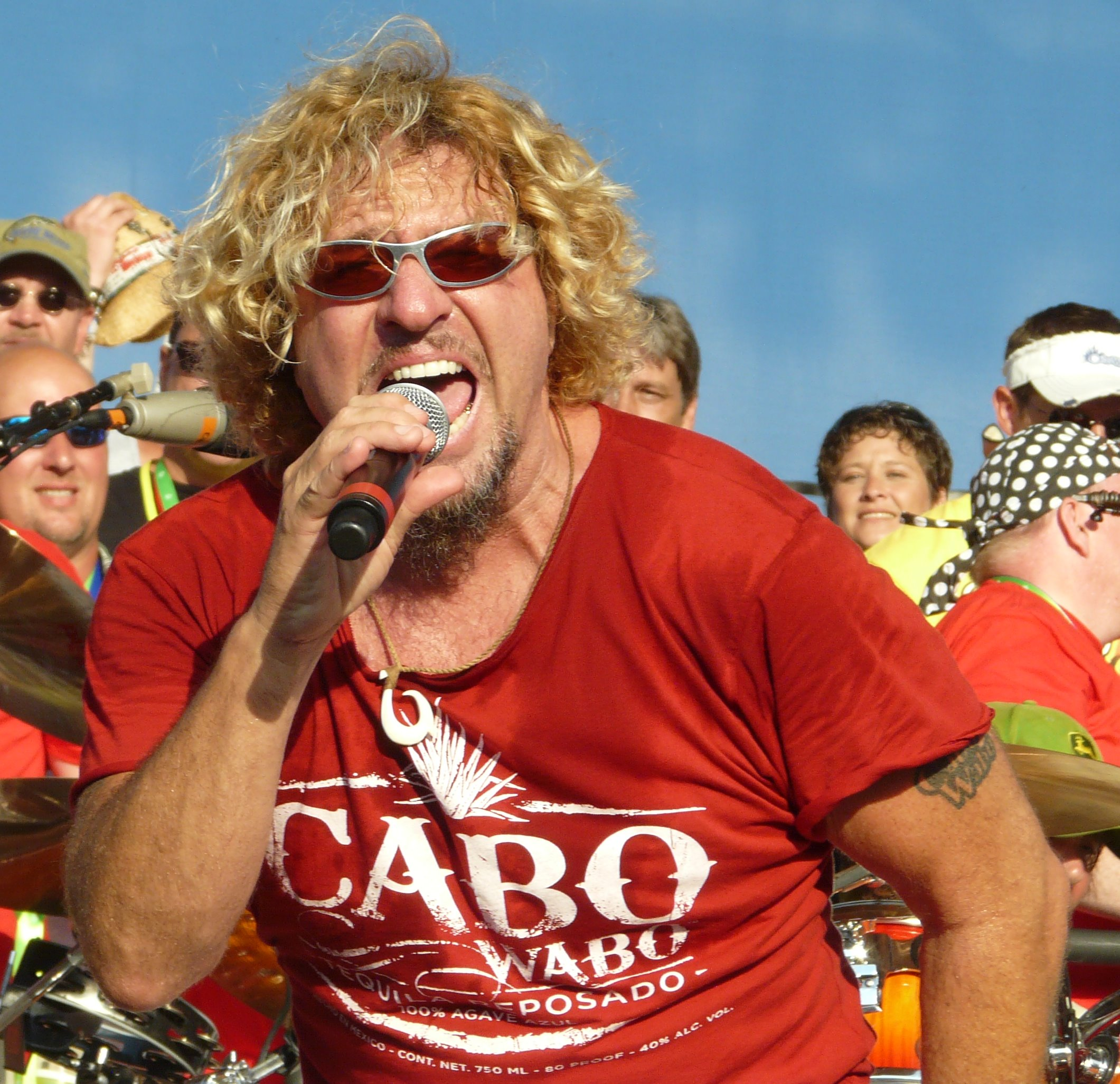
- Hagar performing at the Moondance Jam in 2008
- Studio albums: 26
- Live albums: 8
- Compilation albums: 16
- Singles: 103
- Video albums: 8

Sammy Hagar is an American musician and songwriter with a music career spanning over 40 years. He rose to prominence during the early 1970s as the lead vocalist of the hard rock band Montrose. He left the band in the mid-1970s and embraced a solo career, releasing his debut studio album Nine on a Ten Scale in 1976. He has since kept a steady successful solo career, achieving a hit in 1984 with "I Can't Drive 55". Hagar later joined Van Halen, replacing lead singer David Lee Roth in 1985. Hagar is also known for having associated with and being a member of various other bands.

== Studio albums anthology ==
This list chronologically lists solo and band studio albums.

Band	Album	Year	Chart (US)	RIAA (US)	Guitar	Bass	Drums	Keyboards
Montrose	Montrose	1973	133	Platinum	Ronnie Montrose	Bill Church	Denny Carmassi	–
Montrose	Paper Money	1974	65	–	Ronnie Montrose	Alan Fitzgerald	Denny Carmassi	–
Sammy Hagar	Nine on a Ten Scale	1976	–	–	sessions	Bill Church	sessions	Alan Fitzgerald
Sammy Hagar	Sammy Hagar	1977	167	–	David Lewark	Bill Church	Scott Mathews	Alan Fitzgerald
Sammy Hagar	Musical Chairs	1977	100	–	Sammy Hagar / Gary Pihl	Bill Church	Denny Carmassi	Alan Fitzgerald
Sammy Hagar	Street Machine	1979	71	–	Sammy Hagar / Gary Pihl	Bill Church	Chuck Ruff	–
Sammy Hagar	Danger Zone	1980	85	–	Sammy Hagar / Gary Pihl	Bill Church	Chuck Ruff	Geoff Workman
Sammy Hagar	Standing Hampton	1982	28	Platinum	Sammy Hagar / Gary Pihl	Bill Church	David Lauser	–
Sammy Hagar	Three Lock Box	1982	17	Gold	Sammy Hagar / Gary Pihl	Bill Church	David Lauser	–
Sammy Hagar	VOA	1984	32	Platinum	Sammy Hagar / Gary Pihl	Bill Church	David Lauser	Jesse Harms
Hagar Schon Aaronson Shrieve	Through the Fire	1984	42	–	Neal Schon	Kenny Aaronson	Michael Shrieve	–
Van Halen	5150	1986	1	6× Platinum	Eddie Van Halen	Michael Anthony	Alex Van Halen	Eddie Van Halen
Sammy Hagar	I Never Said Goodbye	1987	14	Gold	Sammy Hagar	Eddie Van Halen	David Lauser	Jesse Harms
Van Halen	OU812	1988	1	4× Platinum	Eddie Van Halen	Michael Anthony	Alex Van Halen	Eddie Van Halen
Van Halen	For Unlawful Carnal Knowledge	1991	1	3× Platinum	Eddie Van Halen	Michael Anthony	Alex Van Halen	Eddie Van Halen
Van Halen	Balance	1995	1	3× Platinum	Eddie Van Halen	Michael Anthony	Alex Van Halen	Eddie Van Halen
Sammy Hagar	Marching to Mars	1997	18	–	Sammy Hagar / Vic Johnson	Jonathan Pierce	Denny Carmassi	Jesse Harms
Sammy Hagar & The Waboritas	Red Voodoo	1999	22	–	Sammy Hagar / Vic Johnson	Mona Gnader	David Lauser	Jesse Harms
Sammy Hagar & The Waboritas	Ten 13	2000	52	–	Sammy Hagar / Vic Johnson	Mona Gnader	David Lauser	Jesse Harms
Sammy Hagar & The Waboritas	Not 4 Sale	2002	181	–	Sammy Hagar / Vic Johnson	Mona Gnader	David Lauser	Jesse Harms
Sammy Hagar & The Waboritas	Livin' It Up!	2006	50	–	Sammy Hagar / Vic Johnson	Mona Gnader	David Lauser	–
Sammy Hagar	Cosmic Universal Fashion	2008	95	–	Sammy Hagar / Vic Johnson	Mona Gnader	David Lauser	–
Chickenfoot	Chickenfoot	2009	4	Gold	Joe Satriani	Michael Anthony	Chad Smith	–
Chickenfoot	Chickenfoot III	2011	9	–	Joe Satriani	Michael Anthony	Chad Smith	–
Sammy Hagar	Sammy Hagar & Friends	2013	23	–	Various	Various	Various	–
Sammy Hagar with Vic Johnson	Lite Roast	2014	188	–	Sammy Hagar / Vic Johnson	–	–	–
Sammy Hagar and the Circle	Space Between	2019	4	–	Sammy Hagar / Vic Johnson	Michael Anthony	Jason Bonham	–
Sammy Hagar and the Circle	Crazy Times	2022	95	–	Sammy Hagar / Vic Johnson	Michael Anthony	Jason Bonham	–

== Montrose ==
=== Studio albums ===
Album	Year	Chart (US)	RIAA (US)
Montrose	1973	133	Platinum
Paper Money	1974	65	-

=== Singles ===
Year	Title	Album
1973	"Rock the Nation"	Montrose
1973	"Space Station #5"	Montrose
1973	"Bad Motor Scooter"	Montrose
1974	"I Got the Fire"	Paper Money
1974	"Paper Money"	Paper Money
1974	"Connection"	Paper Money

=== Compilations ===
Hagar was in Montrose from 1973 to 1975. Montrose's compilation include songs featuring Bob James who recorded with the band from 1975 to 1976 and Johnny Edwards who sang for the band in 1987. Consequently, not all songs on this album feature Hagar or his songwriting.

Album	Year	Chart (US)	RIAA (US)	Release period covered (Hagar songs)	Newly released songs with Hagar
The Very Best of Montrose	2000	-	-	1973-1974	No

== Solo and Sammy Hagar & The Waboritas ==
Sammy Hagar solo/Sammy Hagar & The Waboritas discography
- Studio albums: 17
- Live albums: 6
- Compilation albums: 12
- Singles: 60
- Video albums: 3

The Waboritas (also known as "The Wabos") is a backing band Hagar uses on some of his albums, but he tends to still refer to these as solo albums so they have been kept together. On compilation albums, often no distinction is made between Hagar's solo work and his work with the Waboritas so none has been made here.

=== Studio albums ===
Sammy Hagar/Waboritas	Album	Year	Chart (USA)	RIAA (USA)
Sammy Hagar	Nine on a Ten Scale	1976	-	-
Sammy Hagar	Sammy Hagar	1977	167	-
Sammy Hagar	Musical Chairs	1977	100	-
Sammy Hagar	Street Machine	1979	71	-
Sammy Hagar	Danger Zone	1980	85	-
Sammy Hagar	Standing Hampton	1982	28	Platinum
Sammy Hagar	Three Lock Box	1982	17	Gold
Sammy Hagar	VOA	1984	32	Platinum
Sammy Hagar	I Never Said Goodbye	1987	14	Gold
Sammy Hagar	Marching to Mars	1997	18	-
Sammy Hagar & The Waboritas	Red Voodoo	1999	22	-
Sammy Hagar & The Waboritas	Ten 13	2000	52	-
Sammy Hagar & The Waboritas	Not 4 Sale	2002	181	-
Sammy Hagar & The Waboritas	Livin' It Up!	2006	50	-
Sammy Hagar	Cosmic Universal Fashion	2008	95	-
Sammy Hagar	Sammy Hagar & Friends	2013	23	-
Sammy Hagar	Lite Roast	2014	188	-

Note: I Never Said Goodbye was originally named Sammy Hagar but was renamed after an MTV competition where a fan got to pick a name for the album.

=== Live albums ===
Artist	Album	Year	Chart (USA)	RIAA (USA)
Sammy Hagar	All Night Long	1978	89	-
Sammy Hagar	Live 1980	1983	203	-
Sammy Hagar & The Waboritas	Live: Hallelujah	2003	152	-
Sammy Hagar	Special Limited Edition (Live In St. Louis Enhanced CD)	2003	-	-
Sammy Hagar	Greatest Hits Live	2003	-	-
Sammy Hagar and the Circle	At Your Service (Live)	2015	78	-

=== Compilations ===
Album	Year	Chart (USA)	RIAA (USA)	Release period covered	Newly released tracks
Rematch	1982	171	—	1976–1980	No
Cruisin' & Boozin'	1984	—	—	1976–1980	No
Red Hot!	1989	—	—	1976–1980	No
The Best of Sammy Hagar	1992	—	—	1976–1980	No
Turn Up the Music!	1993	—	—	1976–1980	No
Unboxed	1994	51	Gold	1981–1987	2 songs
The Anthology	1994	—	—	1973–1984	No
The Best of Sammy Hagar	1999	—	—	1977–1979	No
Masters of Rock	2001	—	—	1976–1980	No
Classic Masters	2002	—	—	1977–1980	No
The Essential Red Collection	2004	75	—	1973–1999	2 songs
This Is Sammy Hagar: When the Party Started Volume 1	2016	—	—	1999–2006	2 songs

=== Singles ===
List of songs, with selected chart positions, showing year released and album name
Year	Title	Peak positions					Album	Sammy Hagar/Waboritas
Year	Title	US	US Hard Rock	US Mainstream	Canada	UK	Album	Sammy Hagar/Waboritas
1976	"Flamingos Fly"	—	—	—	—	—	Nine on a Ten Scale	Sammy Hagar
1977	"Cruisin' and Boozin'"	—	—	—	—	—	Sammy Hagar	Sammy Hagar
1977	"Catch the Wind"	—	—	—	—	—	Sammy Hagar	Sammy Hagar
1977	"Filmore Shuffle"	—	—	—	—	—	Sammy Hagar	Sammy Hagar
1977	"Turn Up the Music"	—	—	—	—	—	Musical Chairs	Sammy Hagar
1977	"You Make Me Crazy"	62	—	—	84	—	Musical Chairs	Sammy Hagar
1978	"I've Done Everything for You"	—	—	—	—	36	All Night Long / Loud & Clear	Sammy Hagar
1979	"(Sittin' on) The Dock of the Bay"	65	—	—	66	—	Non-album single	Sammy Hagar
1979	"Plain Jane"	77	—	—	—	—	Street Machine	Sammy Hagar
1979	"Falling in Love"	—	—	—	—	—	Street Machine	Sammy Hagar
1979	"This Planet's on Fire"	—	—	—	—	52	Street Machine	Sammy Hagar
1980	"Straight to the Top"	—	—	—	—	—	Street Machine	Sammy Hagar
1980	"Heartbeat"	—	—	—	—	67	Danger Zone	Sammy Hagar
1980	"Run for Your Life"	—	—	—	—	—	Danger Zone	Sammy Hagar
1981	"Heavy Metal"	—	—	—	—	—	Heavy Metal soundtrack	Sammy Hagar
1982	"I'll Fall in Love Again"	43	—	2	44	—	Standing Hampton	Sammy Hagar
1982	"Piece of My Heart"	73	—	—	—	67	Standing Hampton	Sammy Hagar
1982	"There's Only One Way to Rock" [promo]	—	—	31	—	—	Standing Hampton	Sammy Hagar
1982	"Baby's on Fire" [airplay]	—	—	35	—	—	Standing Hampton	Sammy Hagar
1982	"Can't Get Loose" [airplay]	—	—	49	—	—	Standing Hampton	Sammy Hagar
1982	"Fast Times at Ridgemont High" [airplay]	—	—	21	—	—	Fast Times at Ridgemont High soundtrack	Sammy Hagar
1982	"Your Love Is Driving Me Crazy"	13	—	3	19	—	Three Lock Box	Sammy Hagar
1983	"Remember the Heroes" [airplay]	—	—	6	—	—	Three Lock Box	Sammy Hagar
1983	"I Don't Need Love" [airplay]	—	—	24	—	—	Three Lock Box	Sammy Hagar
1983	"Never Give Up"	46	—	—	—	—	Three Lock Box	Sammy Hagar
1984	"Two Sides of Love"	38	—	5	99	—	VOA	Sammy Hagar
1984	"I Can't Drive 55"	26	—	9	—	—	VOA	Sammy Hagar
1984	"VOA" [promo]	—	—	—	—	—	VOA	Sammy Hagar
1984	"Swept Away" [promo]	—	—	—	—	—	VOA	Sammy Hagar
1987	"Winner Takes It All"	54	—	3	—	—	Over the Top soundtrack	Sammy Hagar
1987	"Give to Live"	23	—	1	47	78	I Never Said Goodbye	Sammy Hagar
1987	"Boy's Night Out" [airplay]	—	—	15	—	—	I Never Said Goodbye	Sammy Hagar
1987	"Returning Home" [airplay]	—	—	20	—	—	I Never Said Goodbye	Sammy Hagar
1987	"Eagles Fly"	82	—	22	—	—	I Never Said Goodbye	Sammy Hagar
1994	"High Hopes"	—	—	4	—	—	Unboxed	Sammy Hagar
1994	"Buying My Way into Heaven"	—	—	36	—	—	Unboxed	Sammy Hagar
1997	"Marching to Mars"	—	—	3	39	—	Marching to Mars	Sammy Hagar
1997	"Little White Lie"	—	—	1	41	—	Marching to Mars	Sammy Hagar
1997	"Both Sides Now"	—	—	11	—	—	Marching to Mars	Sammy Hagar
1997	"Kama"	—	—	—	—	—	Marching to Mars	Sammy Hagar
1998	"On the Other Hand"	—	—	—	—	—	Marching to Mars	Sammy Hagar
1999	"Shag"	—	—	22	—	—	Red Voodoo	Sammy Hagar & The Waboritas
1999	"Mas Tequila"	116	—	2	—	—	Red Voodoo	Sammy Hagar & The Waboritas
1999	"Right on Right"	—	—	—	—	—	Red Voodoo	Sammy Hagar & The Waboritas
2000	"Serious Juju"	—	—	10	—	—	Ten 13	Sammy Hagar & The Waboritas
2000	"Deeper Kinda Love"	—	—	—	—	—	Ten 13	Sammy Hagar & The Waboritas
2001	"Let Sally Drive (Ride Sally Ride)"	—	—	16	—	—	Ten 13	Sammy Hagar & The Waboritas
2001	"I Can't Drive 65"	—	—	—	—	—	Non-album single	Sammy Hagar & The Waboritas
2002	"Things've Changed"	—	—	35	—	—	Not 4 Sale	Sammy Hagar & The Waboritas
2003	"Hallelujah"	—	—	—	—	—	Live: Hallelujah	Sammy Hagar & The Waboritas
2004	"Call My Name"	—	—	—	—	—	The Essential Red Collection	Sammy Hagar
2005	"Let Me Take You There"	—	—	—	—	—	Livin' It Up	Sammy Hagar & The Waboritas
2006	"Sam I Am"	—	—	—	—	—	Livin' It Up	Sammy Hagar & The Waboritas
2006	"Mexico"	—	—	—	—	—	Livin' It Up	Sammy Hagar & The Waboritas
2007	"Open"	—	—	—	—	—	Non-album single	Sammy Hagar
2008	"I'm on a Roll"	—	—	—	—	—	Cosmic Universal Fashion	Sammy Hagar
2008	"Cosmic Universal Fashion"	—	—	—	—	—	Cosmic Universal Fashion	Sammy Hagar
2008	"Loud"	—	—	—	—	—	Cosmic Universal Fashion	Sammy Hagar
2013	"Knockdown Dragout"	—	—	—	—	—	Sammy Hagar & Friends	Sammy Hagar
2013	"Personal Jesus"	—	—	—	—	—	Sammy Hagar & Friends	Sammy Hagar
2016	"Inner Child"	—	—	—	—	—	Non-album single	Sammy Hagar
2025	"Encore. Thank You. Goodnight."	—	2	—	—	—	Non-album single	Sammy Hagar

=== Music videos ===
Year	Video	Director	Editor
1983	"Your Love is Driving Me Crazy"		
1983	"Three Lock Box"	Rick Sereeni	
1984	"Two Sides of Love"	Leslie Libman	Peter Cohen
1984	"I Can't Drive 55"	Gil Bettman	
1985	"VOA"	Gil Bettman	
1987	"Hands and Knees"	John Sanborn	
1987	"Winner Takes It All"		
1987	"Give to Live"	Gil Bettman	
1997	"Little White Lie"	Kevin Donovan	
1997	"Kama"		
1999	"Mas Tequila"	Gil Bettman	Paul Ware
2002	"Things've Changed"	Gil Bettman	Paul Ware
2006	"Sam I Am"	Paul Ware	Paul Ware
2008	"LOUD"	Andrew Bennett	
2008	"Cosmic Universal Fashion"	Zan Passante & Todd Gallopo	
2013	"Knockdown Dragout"	Arthur Rosato	Albert Lopez & Jon Luini

=== Video releases ===
Year	Title	Producer	Director	Editor	Awards
2001	Cabo Wabo Birthday Bash Tour	Allen Kelman	Jeb Brien		
2003	The Long Road To Cabo	David Huseonica; Andrew Molina	Gil Bettman	Paul Ware	Aurora Gold Award; Best Editing
2007	Sammy and The Wabos: Livin' It Up In St. Louis	Evan Haiman	Hank Lena	Ray Volkema	
2010	Go There Once, Be There Twice[unreleased]	Paul Ware	Gil Bettman	Paul Ware	Special Achievement; Lake Arrowhead Film Festival

=== Guest appearances ===
Year	Album	Artist	Comment
1967	non-album single	Samson & Hagar	Appears on a single released on the Ranwood label: "Reach Out To Find Me" b/w "Read My Thoughts"
1981	Heavy Metal soundtrack	Sammy Hagar	Original version of the song "Heavy Metal"
1982	Fast Times at Ridgemont High	Sammy Hagar	Hagar plays the title track
1984	Footloose	Sammy Hagar	"The Girl Gets Around"
1987	Over The Top Soundtrack	Sammy Hagar	"Winner Takes It All"
1992	Lone Ranger	Jeff Watson	Vocal scatts on "Cement Shoes"
1995	Welcome to the Neighbourhood	Meat Loaf	"Amnesty is Granted", which later appeared on Hagar's Marching to Mars record
1997	A Fistful of Alice	Alice Cooper	Guest lead guitar on "School's Out" - Live June 2, 1996, at Hagar's Cabo Wabo Cantina in Mexico
1998	Pleasure & Pain	Roy Rogers	Co-vocals on "You Can't Stop Now"
1999	Kill My Brain	Nick Gravenites And Animal Mind	Guest guitar/backing vocals on "Bad Talking Blues" and "Didn't You Used To Be Somebody"
2007	Baghdad Heavy Metal	Baghdad Heavy Metal	The track "Cosmic Universal Fashion" was included here, which was later reworked and appeared on Hagar's full-length album of the same name.
2011	Santa's Going South	Hagar with Toby Keith	Digital holiday single, released in the U.S. only
2012	Melodicrock.com Volume 9 - 15 Years Later	Hagar with Jesse Harms and Denny Carmassi	"Fallen From Grace". Previously unreleased demo version of the song that was officially released in the 1990 album Brigade by the rock band Heart. The song was written by the trio.
2014	The Art of McCartney	Paul McCartney tribute album	Vocals on "Birthday"
2014	Shutup & Jam!	Ted Nugent	Vocals on "She's Gone"
2017	10x10	Ronnie Montrose	Vocals on "Color Blind"
2021	You and Me	Nancy Wilson	Vocals on "The Boxer"
2022	The Sick, the Dying... and the Dead! (digital edition)	Megadeth	Vocals on "This Planet's on Fire (Burn in Hell)" A cover of Sammy's own 1979 track.

== Hagar Schon Aaronson Shrieve ==
Hagar Schon Aaronson Shrieve discography
- Live albums: 1
- Singles: 1

=== Live album ===
Album	Year	Chart (USA)	RIAA (USA)
Through The Fire	1984	42	-

=== Singles ===
Year	Title	US Hot 100	US Rock	UK Singles Chart	Album
1984	"Whiter Shade of Pale"	94	-	-	Through the Fire

== Van Halen (1985–1996, 2004) ==
=== Studio albums ===
Album	Year	Chart (USA)	RIAA (USA)	Chart (Canada)	CRIA (Canada)
5150	1986	1	6× Platinum	2	3× Platinum
OU812	1988	1	4× Platinum	1	-
For Unlawful Carnal Knowledge	1991	1	3× Platinum	4	Platinum
Balance	1995	1	3× Platinum	2	Platinum

=== Live albums ===
Album	Year	Chart (USA)	RIAA (USA)	Chart (Canada)	CRIA (Canada)
Live: Right Here, Right Now	1993	5	2× Platinum	15	Gold

=== Compilations ===
Hagar was in Van Halen from 1985 to 1996 and 2004. Both of Van Halen's compilation albums also include songs featuring current lead vocalist David Lee Roth who recorded with the band from 1974 to 1985. He returned in 1996 for the first best of album that went #1 on Billboard. He then returned in 2006 and is still a member, touring with them in 2007, 2008, 2012, 2013 and 2015. Consequently, not all songs on these albums feature Hagar or his songwriting.

Album	Year	Chart (USA)	RIAA (USA)	CRIA (Canada)	Release period covered (Hagar songs)	Newly released songs with Hagar
Best Of – Volume I	1996	1	3× Platinum	3× Platinum	1986-1996	1 song
The Best of Both Worlds	2004	3	Platinum	-	1986-1995	3 songs

=== Singles ===
Year	Title	US Hot 100	US Rock	UK Singles Chart	Album
1986	"Why Can't This Be Love"	3	1	8	5150
1986	"Dreams"	22	6	62	5150
1986	"Love Walks In"	22	4	-	5150
1986	"Best of Both Worlds"	-	12	-	5150
1986	"Summer Nights"	-	33	-	5150
1988	"When It's Love"	5	1	28	OU812
1988	"Black and Blue"	34	1	-	OU812
1988	"Finish What Ya Started"	13	2	-	OU812
1988	"Cabo Wabo"	-	31	-	OU812
1988	"Mine All Mine"	-	50	-	OU812
1989	"Feels So Good"	35	6	63	OU812
1991	"Poundcake"	-	1	74	For Unlawful Carnal Knowledge
1991	"Runaround"	-	1	-	For Unlawful Carnal Knowledge
1991	"Top of the World"	27	1	63	For Unlawful Carnal Knowledge
1992	"The Dream Is Over"	-	7	-	For Unlawful Carnal Knowledge
1992	"Right Now"	55	2	-	For Unlawful Carnal Knowledge
1992	"Man on a Mission"	-	21	-	For Unlawful Carnal Knowledge
1993	"Jump" (live)	-	-	26	Live: Right Here, Right Now
1993	"Dreams" (live)	111	-	-	Live: Right Here, Right Now
1993	"Won't Get Fooled Again" (live)	-	1	-	Live: Right Here, Right Now
1995	"The Seventh Seal"	-	36	-	Balance
1995	"Don't Tell Me (What Love Can Do)"	-	1	27	Balance
1995	"Can't Stop Lovin' You"	30	2	33	Balance
1995	"Not Enough"	97	27	-	Balance
1995	"Amsterdam"	-	9	-	Balance
1996	"Humans Being"	-	1	-	Twister Soundtrack
2004	"It's About Time"	-	6	-	The Best of Both Worlds
2004	"Up For Breakfast"	-	33	-	The Best of Both Worlds

=== Video releases ===
Year	Title	RIAA (USA)
1986	Live Without a Net	2× Platinum
1993	Live: Right Here, Right Now	Gold
1996	Video Hits Volume I	Gold

== with The Hagar/Hart Project ==
The Hagar/Hart Project discography
- Singles: 1

=== Singles ===
Year	Title	US Hot 100	US Rock	UK Singles Chart	Album
1999	"Code War"	-	-	-	Non-album single

== Chickenfoot ==
=== Studio album ===
Chickenfoot discography
- Studio albums: 2
- Live albums: 1
- Singles: 7

Album	Year	Chart (US)	RIAA (US)	Chart (Canada)	CRIA (Canada)
Chickenfoot	2009	4	Gold	5	Gold
Chickenfoot III	2011	9	-	-	-

=== Live albums ===
Album	Year	Chart (USA)	RIAA (USA)	Chart (Canada)	CRIA (Canada)
LV	2012	-	-	-	-

=== Singles ===
Year	Title	US Hot 100	US Rock	UK Singles Chart	Album
2009	"Oh Yeah"	-	21	-	Chickenfoot
2009	"Soap on a Rope"	-	-	-	Chickenfoot
2009	"Sexy Little Thing"	-	40	-	Chickenfoot
2009	"My Kinda Girl"	-	-	-	Chickenfoot
2011	"Big Foot"	-	32	-	Chickenfoot III
2011	"Different Devil"	-	-	-	Chickenfoot III
2017	"Divine Termination"	-	-	-	Best + Live

== Sammy Hagar and the Circle ==
Sammy Hagar and the Circle discography
- Studio albums: 2
- Live albums: 1
- Singles: 3

=== Studio albums ===
Album	Year	Chart (USA)	RIAA (USA)	Chart (Canada)	CRIA (Canada)
Space Between	2019	4	-	-	-
Lockdown 2020	2021	-	-	-	-
Crazy Times	2022	95	-	-	-

=== Live albums ===
Album	Year	Chart (USA)	RIAA (USA)	Chart (Canada)	CRIA (Canada)
At Your Service.	2015	78	-	-	-

=== Singles ===
Year	Title	US Hot 100	US Rock	UK Singles Chart	Album
2019	"Trust Fund Baby"	-	-	-	Space Between
2019	"Can't Hang"	-	-	-	Space Between
2021	"Heroes"	-	-	-	Lockdown 2020

=== Music videos ===
Year	Video	Director
2019	"Trust Frund Baby"	ZZ Satriani
2019	"Can't Hang"	-
2021	"Heroes"	Jon R. Luini
2022	"Crazy Times"	Travis Detweiler
2022	"Pump It Up"	Travis Detweiler
2022	"Funky Feng Shui"	Travis Detweiler
