= Lite Roast =

Studio album by Sammy Hagar with Vic Johnson
- Released: October 14, 2014
- Recorded: 2013–2014
- Genres: Acoustic, country
- Length: 39:52
- Label: Mailboat Records
- Producers: Sammy Hagar, Vic Johnson, Bob Daspit, Jaimeson Durr

Sammy Hagar chronology
Sammy Hagar & Friends (2013)	Lite Roast (2014)	At Your Service (2015)

Professional ratings
Review scores
Source	Rating
Allmusic	3/5 stars
Ottawa Sun	3/5 stars

Lite Roast is the seventeenth studio album by American rock singer Sammy Hagar, and his first acoustic & unplugged album. The album was released on October 14, 2014, by Mailboat Records. It includes acoustically re-recorded versions of Hagar's previously released songs.

== Track listing ==
No.	Title	Writer(s)	Previous appearance	Length
1.	"Red Voodoo"	Sammy Hagar	Red Voodoo	3:19
2.	"One Sip"	Kenny Chesney / Sammy Hagar	Livin' It Up!	2:24
3.	"Finish What Ya Started"	Michael Anthony / Sammy Hagar / Alex Van Halen / Eddie Van Halen	OU812	4:02
4.	"Eagles Fly"	Sammy Hagar	I Never Said Goodbye	4:49
5.	"The Love"	Larry Dvoskin / Sammy Hagar / Neal Schon	Red Voodoo	3:44
6.	"Father Sun"	Sammy Hagar	Sammy Hagar & Friends	3:41
7.	"Dreams"	Michael Anthony / Sammy Hagar / Alex Van Halen / Eddie Van Halen	5150	3:55
8.	"Deeper Kinda Love"	Larry Dvoskin / Sammy Hagar	Ten 13	2:43
9.	"Who Has The Right?"	Sammy Hagar	Marching To Mars	4:02
10.	"Sailin'"	Sammy Hagar	Livin' It Up!	3:45
11.	"Halfway to Memphis"	Sammy Hagar	Not 4 Sale	3:25
12.	"Personal Jesus (iTunes bonus track)"	Martin Gore	Sammy Hagar & Friends	3:22
Total length:				39:52

== Personnel ==
- Sammy Hagar - lead vocals, guitar
- Vic Johnson - guitar, backing vocals
- Andre Thierry - accordion on tracks 1 & 11
