= Live: Hallelujah =

Live album by Sammy Hagar and The Waboritas
- Released: May 20, 2003
- Recorded: 2002
- Genre: Hard rock
- Length: 77:29
- Label: Silverline Records
- Producer: Bob Daspit

Sammy Hagar and The Waboritas chronology
Not 4 Sale (2002)	Live: Hallelujah (2003)	Livin' It Up! (2006)

Professional ratings
Review scores
Source	Rating
Allmusic	2.5/5 stars

Live: Hallelujah is a live album by Sammy Hagar and The Waboritas.

== Track list ==
1. "Shaka Doobie (The Limit)" (Sammy Hagar) – 3:30
  - originally from Hagar's Ten 13 album.
  - recorded at the Mars Music Amphitheater in Tampa, Florida, on July 31, 2002.
2. "Three Lock Box" (Sammy Hagar) – 3:40
  - originally from Hagar's Three Lock Box album.
  - recorded at the UMB Bank Pavilion in Maryland Heights, Missouri, on June 7, 2002.
3. "There's Only One Way to Rock" (Sammy Hagar) – 4:05
  - originally from Hagar's Standing Hampton album.
  - recorded at the UMB Bank Pavilion in Maryland Heights, Missouri, on June 7, 2002.
4. "Give to Live" (Sammy Hagar) - 4:08
  - originally from Hagar's I Never Said Goodbye album.
  - recorded at the UMB Bank Pavilion in Maryland Heights, Missouri, on June 7, 2002.
5. "Top of the World" (Michael Anthony/Sammy Hagar/Alex Van Halen/Edward Van Halen) – 3:50
  - originally from Van Halen's For Unlawful Carnal Knowledge album.
  - recorded at the UMB Bank Pavilion in Maryland Heights, Missouri, on June 7, 2002.
6. "Deeper Kinda Love" (Larry Dvoskin/Sammy Hagar) – 4:27
  - originally from Hagar's Ten 13 album.
  - recorded at the UMB Bank Pavilion in Maryland Heights, Missouri, on June 7, 2002.
7. "Why Can't This Be Love" (Michael Anthony/Sammy Hagar/Alex Van Halen/Edward Van Halen) – 3:46
  - originally from Van Halen's 5150 album.
  - recorded at the UMB Bank Pavilion in Maryland Heights, Missouri, on June 7, 2002.
8. "Eagles Fly" (Sammy Hagar) – 5:02
  - originally from Hagar's I Never Said Goodbye album.
  - recorded at the UMB Bank Pavilion in Maryland Heights, Missouri, on June 7, 2002.
9. "Little White Lie" (Sammy Hagar) – 3:41
  - originally from Hagar's Marching To Mars album.
  - recorded at the UMB Bank Pavilion in Maryland Heights, Missouri, on June 7, 2002.
10. "Rock Candy" (Denny Carmassi/Bill Church/Sammy Hagar/Ronnie Montrose) – 4:40
  - originally from Montrose's first album, Montrose.
  - recorded at the Mars Music Amphitheater in Tampa, Florida, on July 31, 2002.
11. "I Can't Drive 55" (Sammy Hagar) – 4:55
  - originally from Hagar's VOA album.
  - recorded at the UMB Bank Pavilion in Maryland Heights, Missouri, on June 7, 2002.
12. "Mas Tequila" (Gary Glitter/Sammy Hagar/Mike Leander) – 5:19
  - originally from Hagar's Red Voodoo album.
  - recorded at the UMB Bank Pavilion in Maryland Heights, Missouri, on June 7, 2002.
13. "Heavy Metal" (Sammy Hagar/Jim Peterik) – 4:47
  - originally from Hagar's Standing Hampton album.
  - recorded at the UMB Bank Pavilion in Maryland Heights, Missouri, on June 7, 2002.
14. "When It's Love" (Michael Anthony/Sammy Hagar/Alex Van Halen/Edward Van Halen) – 5:38
  - originally from Van Halen's OU812 album.
  - recorded at the Tweeter Center For The Performing Arts in Mansfield, Massachusetts, on August 28, 2002.
15. "Right Now" (Michael Anthony/Sammy Hagar/Alex Van Halen/Edward Van Halen) – 5:35
  - originally from Van Halen's For Unlawful Carnal Knowledge album.
  - recorded at the Verizon Wireless Amphitheater in Charlotte, North Carolina, on August 7, 2002.
16. "Dreams" (Michael Anthony/Sammy Hagar/Alex Van Halen/Edward Van Halen) – 4:59
  - originally from Van Halen's 5150 album.
  - recorded at the Selland Arena in Fresno, California, on June 27, 2002.
17. "Hallelujah" (Sammy Hagar) – 4:17
  - originally from Hagar's Not 4 Sale album.
  - the same studio track as on Not 4 Sale.

== Personnel ==
- Sammy Hagar: lead vocals and guitar
- Vic Johnson: guitar
- Jesse Harms: keyboards
- Mona Gnader: bass guitar
- David Lauser: drums

=== Special guests ===
- Michael Anthony: bass guitar and background vocals on "Top of the World", "When It's Love", "Right Now" and "Dreams"
- Gary Cherone: duet lead vocal with Hagar on "When It's Love"
- Pat Badger, Fran Sheehan, Sib Hashian, Barry Goudreau: backing vocals on "When It's Love"

== Singles ==
- "Hallelujah" b/w "Right Now (live)" (Sanctuary SANDJ-85553-2)

== Versions ==
- Sanctuary (Europe) : MISCD026
- Sanctuary (UK) : MISPRO26
- Sanctuary (US) : SANSP-84608-2
- Sanctuary (Japan) : PCCY-01675
