= Sound Barrier =

American heavy metal band

- Origin: Los Angeles, California, U.S.
- Genres: Heavy metal, hard rock
- Years active: 1980–1987, 2017–present
- Labels: MCA, Pit Pull, Metal Blade, Firebrand
- Members: Bernie K. Spacey T. Stanley E. Eric Valentine
- Past members: Dave Brown

Sound Barrier is an American pioneering all-black heavy metal quartet from Los Angeles, whose members have also recorded and toured with acts such as Masi, Total Eclipse, Mother's Finest and Fishbone.

== Biography ==
Formed in 1980 after vocalist Bernie K. and guitarist Spacey T. met while playing in a R&B funk band, Sound Barrier was most notable for the fact that, as a heavy metal band specializing in what was widely perceived to be a "white-dominated" genre, all four original members were African American, which gained them significant publicity but did not result in commercial success. They were signed by MCA Records but quickly dropped again when their debut album, Total Control (1982), sold just 12,000 copies.

The band issued a self-released EP, Born to Rock (1984), engineered and produced by Karat Faye, which contained a cover of the Steppenwolf classic "Born to Be Wild". Bassist Stanley E. left the fold in 1986 and was replaced by Romanian-born Emil Lech who had previously played in Terriff with future Ozzy Osbourne guitarist Joe Holmes.

The band was signed to Metal Blade for their Speed of Light LP (1986), this time covering Thin Lizzy's "Hollywood (Down on Your Luck)", but split up the following year. Lead vocalist Bernie Kimbell and drummer Dave "Skavido" Brown again teamed up in Masi, another Metal Blade act, led by Italian guitarist Alex Masi, and recorded the Fire in the Rain album in 1987. Guitarist Spacey T. formed the band Gangland, recruiting Stanley E. on bass, and recorded a three-song demo with the record producer Bill Metoyer in 1988.

Emil Lech joined Joshua for their 1988 album, Intense Defense, before forming Driver with fellow Joshua members Rob Rock and Greg Shultz, releasing a self-titled cassette-only EP in 1990. After the demise of Driver, Lech moved to Germany where he founded the band Ape with guitarists Matthias Dieth and Andy Susemihl, both formerly with Sinner and U.D.O., and drummer Chris Pfannschmidt. The band released the album, Human Greed, in 1992 before splitting up.

Parting ways with Masi after the Fire In The Rain album, Kimbell and Brown joined forces with former The BusBoys members Vic Johnson and Andre "Dre" Berry in Total Eclipse whose sole album was released in 1992 on the A&M Records distributed label Tabu Records. The band's MTV video single was for the song "Fire in the Rain", which Kimbell and Brown had previously cut with Masi.

Following the demise of Gangland, Spacey T. joined the ranks of funk/hard rock pioneers Mother's Finest and helped co-write and record their 1992 album Black Radio Won't Play This Record. He also toured with the group. In 1997, he joined Los Angeles alternative rock act Fishbone, and toured and recorded with the band until 2003. Upon his departure, he formed Year Of The Dragon along with Fishbone founding member Walter Kibby II, a.k.a. Dirt Walt, recording the A Time To Love Is A Time To Bleed EP (2006) and Blunt Force Karma album (2009).

On August 16, 2013, Bernie Kimbell organized a cancer benefit show for former bandmate, Dave Brown, which took place at Paladino's in Tarzana, Los Angeles, with live appearances by Armored Saint, DC4, Roy Z & Friends and P.A.I.D.. as well as members of The BusBoys, Warrior, World War III, Hellion, Steeler, and Bitch, among others. Brown died on November 12, 2013.

On April 18, 2017, a reunited Sound Barrier played the Whisky a Go Go in Hollywood, California, as part of the Ultimate Jam Night under the "Metal Has No Color" banner. Original members Bernie K., Spacey T. and Stanley E. were joined by Eric Valentine on drums; also on hand were Tom Morello of Rage Against the Machine, dUg Pinnick of King's X, Corey Glover of Living Colour, and Doc Coyle of God Forbid. At the show, Sound Barrier premiered their new single, "I'm Just A Man", produced by Morello and released on his label, Firebrand Records, on April 28, 2017.

== Members ==
- Bernie K. - vocals (1980–1987, 2017–present) (born Bernie Kimbell)
- Spacey T. - guitar (1980–1987, 2017–present) (born Tracey Singleton)
- Stanley E. - bass (1980–1986, 2017–present) (born Stanley Davis)
- Emil Lech – bass (1986–1987) (born Emil Lechințeanu)
- Dave "Skavido" Brown – drums
- Eric Valentine – drums (2017–present)

== Discography ==
=== Singles ===
- "I'm Just a Man" (2017)

=== Albums ===
- Total Control (1983)
- Speed of Light (1986)

=== EPs ===
- Born to Rock (1984)

=== Music videos ===
- "Rock Without the Roll" (1983)
- "Born to Rock" (1984)

== Bibliography ==
- Hale, Mark (1993). "2763 Sound Barrier". Headbangers (First edition, second printing ed.). Ann Arbor, Michigan: Popular Culture, Ink. p. 327. ISBN 1-56075-029-4.
