= The Best of Sammy Hagar =

The Best of Sammy Hagar is the name of two albums:

- The Best of Sammy Hagar (1992 album)
- The Best of Sammy Hagar (1999 album)
