= List of Rock and Roll Road Trip with Sammy Hagar episodes =

Rock and Roll Road Trip with Sammy Hagar Presented by Mercury Insurance was an original music series on AXS TV hosted by Sammy Hagar. The series features Hagar traveling the country to interview and often perform with popular and influential musicians.

The following is a complete list of Rock and Roll Road Trip episodes.

== Series overview ==
Season	Episodes	Originally released	
Season	Episodes	First released	Last released
1	6	January 24, 2016	February 28, 2016
2	13	March 5, 2017	August 13, 2017
3	12	April 8, 2018	June 24, 2018
4	12	May 5, 2019	July 28, 2019
5	6	April 19, 2020	May 31, 2020

== Episodes ==
=== Season 1 (2016) ===
No. overall	No. in season	Title	Featured guest	Original release date
1	1	"Sunset Strip"	Tommy Lee, Michael Anthony	January 24, 2016
Sammy heads to Sunset Blvd to reminisce at the Whisky A-Go-Go with Van Halen legend Michael Anthony, before visiting with former Mötley Crüe drummer Tommy Lee at his house. The All Star Trio then performs at Tommy's studio.
2	2	"San Fran & the Dead"	Bob Weir, Mickey Hart	January 31, 2016
Join Sammy as he heads west to Mill Valley, California to catch up with members of the Grateful Dead. Prepare to become a Deadhead as Sammy joins Bob Weir for an acoustic set at the Sweetwater Music Hall followed by a spacey jam at Mickey Hart's studio in the mountains.
3	3	"Cooperstown"	Alice Cooper	February 7, 2016
Things heat up this week when Sammy takes a trip to Phoenix, Arizona to meet up with 'the Godfather of Shock Rock', Alice Cooper.
4	4	"Carolina Rebellion"	Michael Anthony, Jason Bonham, Vic Johnson	February 14, 2016
Sammy teams up with his band The Circle featuring Jason Bonham, to headline Florida's largest waterfront music festival, SunFest, before heading to North Carolina to headline the Carolina Rebellion Festival in front of 50k rocking fans.
5	5	"LA Grammy Museum"	Nancy Wilson, Jerry Cantrell, Kevin Cronin	February 21, 2016
Sammy explores the Grammy Museum at L.A. Live with REO Speedwagon legend Kevin Cronin. Later joined by Heart's Nancy Wilson and Alice In Chain's Jerry Cantrell. They exchange personal stories, followed by an intimate performance.
6	6	"Cabo Birthday Bash"	Michael Anthony, Jason Bonham, Vic Johnson	February 28, 2016
Sammy flies down to Cabo for his annual "Birthday Bash" to perform for his fans called the "Redheads". It's an exclusive, behind the scenes celebration that is now in its 20th year.

=== Season 2 (2017) ===
No. overall	No. in season	Title	Featured guest	Original release date
7	1	"Acoustic 4 A Cure"	John Mayer, Joe Satriani, James Hetfield, Melissa Etheridge, Patrick Monahan, Tommy Lee	March 5, 2017
Sammy Hagar heads to the landmark Fillmore Theatre in San Francisco to perform his annual Acoustic-4-A-Cure Concert. He sits down with John Mayer and Joe Satriani and later they all hit the stage with fellow musicians James Hetfield (Metallica), Melissa Etheridge, Pat Monahan (Train), and Tommy Lee (Mötley Crüe).
8	2	"Big Dog Daddy"	Toby Keith	March 12, 2017
Sammy flies to Norman, Oklahoma to hang out with Toby Keith. They visit Toby's restaurant and then do an interview and an acoustic performance at Toby's 160-acre ranch.
9	3	"Small Town"	John Mellencamp	March 19, 2017
This week, Sammy travels to Bloomington, Indiana to hang with John Mellencamp at his art studio. They discuss John's career, Farm Aid, and his passion for painting.
10	4	"Two Stops"	Rick Nielsen, Michael Anthony, Jason Bonham, Vic Johnson	March 26, 2017
Sammy drops in with Cheap Trick's guitar God Rick Nielsen in Chicago to talk rock history. He then heads to Denver, Colorado to play the iconic Red Rocks Amphitheatre with his band The Circle (Michael Anthony, Jason Bonham and Vic Johnson).
11	5	"Blues & Wine"	Billy Gibbons	April 2, 2017
Sammy drops by the unique concert hall, Mountain Winery, in Saratoga, California to sit down with ZZ Top's Billy Gibbons to talk rock and roll, followed by an intimate blues performance.
12	6	"Aloha Fleetwood"	Mick Fleetwood	April 9, 2017
Sammy travels to Maui to visit with Fleetwood Mac founder Mick Fleetwood. The Maui neighbors catch up on music and art and jump on stage at Fleetwoods on Front Street to perform a Fleetwood Mac classic.
13	7	"Livin' Live"	TBA	April 16, 2017
The Season 2 Best of Rock and Roll Road Trip with Sammy Hagar brings you never before seen performances featuring Sammy and various season 2 guests.
14	8	"Vegas Rocks"	Don Felder, Tommy Shaw, James Young, Carrot Top	July 9, 2017
This week, check out Sammy in Las Vegas, Nevada to hang out with Carrot Top, cruise the strip in a classic Cadillac with Don Felder, hang backstage at the Venetian Theater with Classic Rock icons Styx, and join in on a Hotel California jam.
15	9	"Chicken & Chili"	Chad Smith, Joe Satriani	July 16, 2017
Red Hot Chili Peppers/Chickenfoot drummer Chad Smith drops by Sammy's studio to catch up and perform new Chickenfoot songs with Joe Satriani and Sammy.
16	10	"Nashville Cats"	Vince Neil	July 23, 2017
Sammy visits with Vince Neil of Mötley Crüe at his home in Nashville, Tennessee. Later, he drops by legendary Phoenix Studios to plug in and play some acoustic songs.
17	11	"Supermensch"	Shep Gordon, Mick Fleetwood	July 30, 2017
Sammy goes back to Maui, Hawaii, and stops by to see "Supermensch" uber-manager Shep Gordon. Shep invites friends and family for dinner and enjoys tunes from Sammy and his friends.
18	12	"South by DMC"	Darryl McDaniels	August 6, 2017
Sammy is honored as a keynote speaker at the World's Biggest Music Festival, South by Southwest (SXSW) in Austin, Texas. He then joins Rock & Roll Hall of Famer, Pioneer of Hip Hop, Run-DMC Frontman Darryl “DMC” McDaniels, in a Rock-Rap jam with Blacktop Mojo as the house band.
19	13	"Marooned in LA"	Adam Levine, Richie Sambora, Orianthi	August 13, 2017
For the Season 2 finale, Sammy heads to Los Angeles to meet up with Maroon 5 frontman, Adam Levine. They hit the road in Adam's Ferrari and Richie Sambora stops by Conway Recording Studios for an unforgettable performance with Adam and Sammy.

=== Season 3 (2018) ===
No. overall	No. in season	Title	Featured guest	Original release date
20	1	"Acoustic Foo A Cure"	Dave Grohl, Taylor Hawkins	April 8, 2018
21	2	"Lake TaWho"	Roger Daltrey	April 15, 2018
22	3	"Rockstar"	Nickelback	April 22, 2018
24	4	"Dirty White Boys"	Mick Jones	April 29, 2018
25	5	"L.A. Metal"	TBA	May 6, 2018
26	6	"Acoustic Part Deux"	Sarah McLachlan, Pat Benatar, Neil Giraldo	May 13, 2018
27	7	"Cruisin' With The Redheads"	Paul Rodgers, Bad Company, Todd Rundgren	May 20, 2018
28	8	"Mardi Gras"	Trombone Shorty, Emeril Lagasse	May 27, 2018
29	9	"Rock & Roll Journey"	Neal Schon,	June 3, 2018
30	10	"Look What the Cat Dragged In"	Bret Michaels	June 10, 2018
31	11	"Sammy 24/7"	Zakk Wylde, Sully Erna,	June 17, 2018
32	12	"Red 'Til I'm (Not) Dead"	Eddie Money, Chad Kroeger, Toby Keith, Darryl McDaniels, Bob Weir. Vinnie Paul, Kenny Aronoff	June 24, 2018

=== Season 4 (2019) ===
No. overall	No. in season	Title	Featured guest	Original release date
33	1	"On The Rock & Roll Road Trip Again"	Willie Nelson	May 5, 2019
34	2	"Low Ridin' in L.A."	Cheech Marin, Tommy Chong	May 12, 2019
35	3	"Rick & Roll Road Trip"	Rick Springfield,	May 19, 2019
36	4	"Rocker Went Down To Georgia"	Charlie Daniels	June 2, 2019
37	5	"48 Can't Drive 55"	Rick Hendrick	June 9, 2019
38	6	"One Bourbon, One Santo, One Beer"	George Thorogood	June 16, 2019
39	7	"Studio to Stage"	Michael Anthony, Jason Bonham	June 23, 2019
40	8	"Rock & Roll Beach Party"	TBA	June 30, 2019
41	9	"Tool'n Around in Flavortown"	Guy Fieri, Maynard Keenan,	July 7, 2019
42	10	"Guitar Legends 2"	Robby Krieger, Joe Bonamassa	July 14, 2019
43	11	"Best Seat In The House"	Kenny Aronoff, Sheila E.	July 21, 2019
44	12	"Welcome to the Road Trip"	Duff McKagan	July 28, 2019

=== Season 5 (2020) ===
No. overall	No. in season	Title	Featured guest	Original release date
45	1	"Viva Def Vegas"	Shaquille O'Neal, Joe Elliott, Def Leppard	April 19, 2020
46	2	"Homecoming"	Rob Thomas	April 26, 2020
47	3	"Hangin' with Uncle Ted"	Ted Nugent	May 3, 2020
48	4	"Save a Horse, Ride a Rockstar"	John Rich, Big Kenny	May 10, 2020
49	5	"Three for the Road"	Brian May, Joe Walsh, Tanya Tucker	May 17, 2020
50	6	"Going to Extremes"	Nuno Bettencourt, Gary Cherone	May 26, 2020
