= Sam I Am =

Sam I Am may refer to:

- a character in Dr. Seuss' book Green Eggs and Ham
- Sam I Am, Serious Sam, a 2001- video game by Croteam
- Sam-I-Am, a 1986 album by Sam Harris
- Sam I Am, a song from Sammy Hagar's album Livin' It Up!
- Samiam, a Berkeley, California punk band
- Sam I Am (TV series), an ABC television series also known as Samantha Be Good and Samantha Who?, starring Christina Applegate
- "Sam I Am" (Charmed), an episode of the television series Charmed
- a nickname for basketball player Sam Cassell
