= The BusBoys =

American rock band

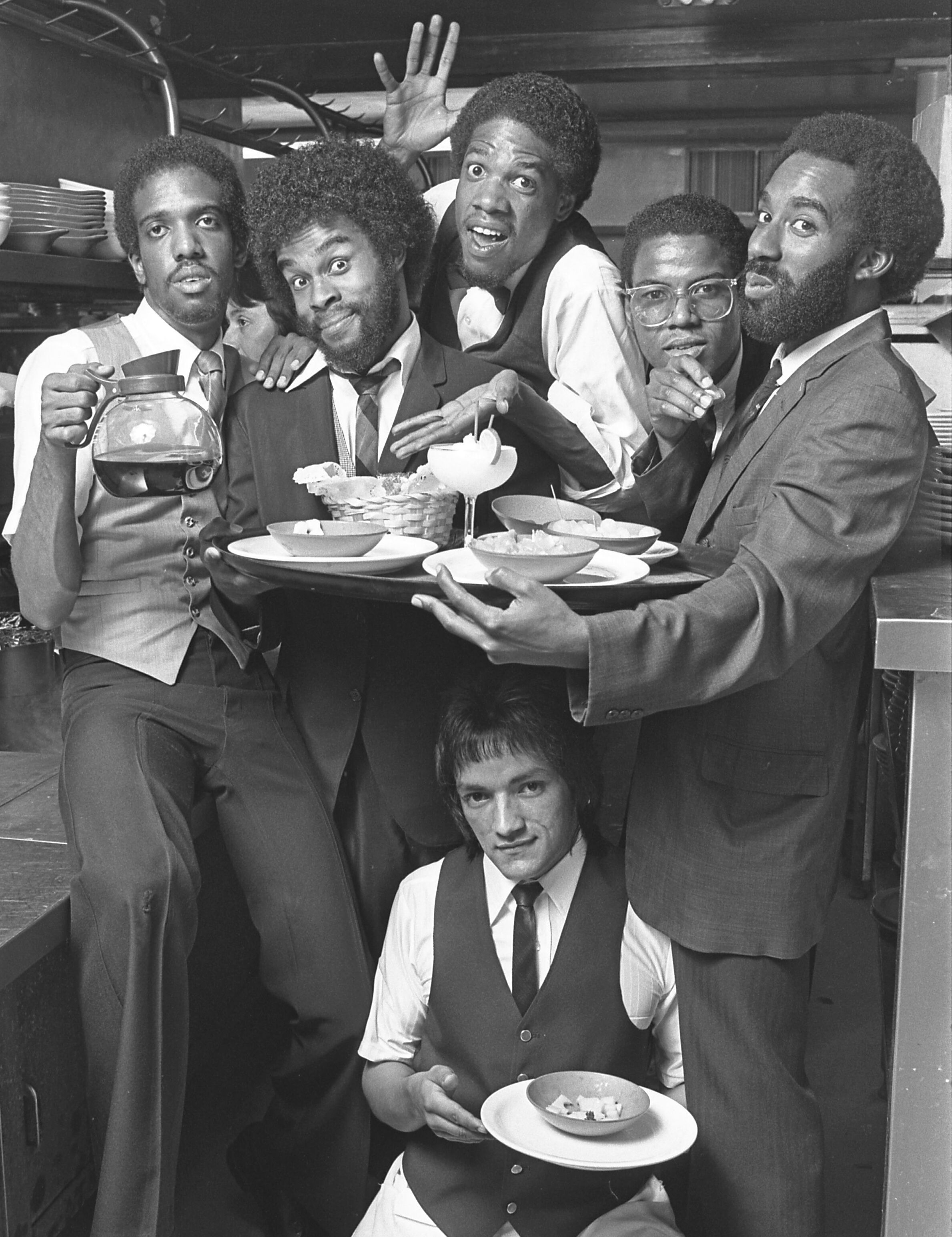
- The BusBoys in 1980

Background information
- Origin: Los Angeles California
- Genres: Rock; R&B; funk; soul
- Years active: 1978–present
- Label: Arista Records
- Members: Brian O'Neal; Kevin O'Neal; Reggie Leon; Kenny Tomlin; Bill Steinway; Vic Johnson; Steve Felix; Jorge Evans; Marc Palmer
- Past members: Gus Loundermon; Mike Jones; Andrew Kapner; Ace Andres
- Website: busboys.com

The BusBoys is an American rock and roll band known for its association with Eddie Murphy and performing in the film 48 Hrs. The band's best known songs are "New Shoes", "The Boys Are Back in Town", which appeared in 48 Hrs. and in Eddie Murphy Delirious, and "Cleanin' Up the Town", written for the 1984 film Ghostbusters.

== Overview ==
The band was formed in Los Angeles in the late 1970s. The original lineup featured brothers Brian O'Neal (keyboards, vocals) and Kevin O'Neal (bass, vocals), Gus Loundermon (sometimes misspelled as "Gus Louderman") (vocals), Mike Jones (keyboards, vocals), Vic Johnson (guitar), and Steve Felix (drums). All of the original band's members were African-Americans except Felix, who is of Hispanic heritage.

The BusBoys are best known for their appearance in the 1982 film 48 Hrs., in which they performed their songs "New Shoes" and "The Boys Are Back in Town" (the latter song is also heard during the closing credits). The band opened for the film's costar, comedian Eddie Murphy, during his subsequent Delirious standup comedy tour—during which he referred to them throughout the program—including an hour-long special that aired on HBO. On January 29, 1983, the BusBoys were also musical guests on an episode of Saturday Night Live with Murphy singing background vocals for the band. A follow-up song, "Cleanin' Up the Town," written for the soundtrack to the 1984 film Ghostbusters, was a minor hit for the group, reaching #68 on Billboard's Hot 100 Singles chart in the United States. The album was nominated for a Grammy award.

The BusBoys' first two albums on Arista Records, Minimum Wage Rock & Roll and American Worker, both reached the Billboard 200 chart.

The BusBoys toured extensively with the original line up, appearing with prominent acts such as Linda Ronstadt, Brian Setzer and The Stray Cats, and ZZ Top. Their many TV appearances included American Bandstand, Soul Train, and Don Kirshner's Rock Concert.

On February 29, 1988, the BusBoys released a third album entitled Money Don't Make No Man with a more synth-funk feel. The track "Never Giving Up" featured Eddie Murphy prominently during the chorus. Murphy also appeared in the music video to support the album release and the song release. The music video was shot at "The Palace," which is now known as "Avalon," on Vine Street in Hollywood, across the street from Capitol Records. The music video was directed by legendary director Wayne Isham.

BusBoys originator and co-producer Kevin O’Neal departed from the group in 1985 and was replaced by Greg French. The band replaced Loundermon with Reggie Leon and Jones with keyboardists Andrew Kapner and Bill Steinway. Kapner, being a 16-year-old high school student, was unable to tour in 1985, and Mike Radi was brought in to play keyboards for the road. Kevin continued to assist behind the scenes, as both O'Neal and Loundermon are credited as additional musicians.

Leon has been a member of Sha Na Na for over 15 years, and Johnson joined Sammy Hagar's back-up band, The Waboritas, in 1999 and continued playing with Hagar in the supergroup Sammy Hagar and the Circle in 2015.

In 2000, the BusBoys released their fourth album, (Boys Are) Back in Town, which featured rerecorded versions of their two popular songs from 48 Hrs. It was the first time that the title track had been made available on one of the band's CDs. Gus Loundermon (vocals) returned to the band's line-up, along with two new members, Kenny Tomlin (bass) and Jorge Evans (guitar). Brian O'Neil commented in an interview with Songfacts that, "for almost 20 years it was probably the most famous song in the history of America that had never been released."

== Comeback ==
The band has enjoyed a rebirth in large part to the popular use of "The Boys Are Back In Town" in various television sports programming. The track has served as the theme for the NBA and Fox Sports Network's coverage of Major League Baseball. In addition, their song "Did You See Me" was used to promote the NFL Re-Play series on the NFL Network in 2006 and 2007.

After several years out of the limelight, The BusBoys made an appearance on ABC TV during the Capital One Bowl on New Years Day 2005 under their new name, "Brian O'Neal and The BusBoys." And in early 2006, they began releasing tracks from their new music project, Sex, Love and Rock & Roll, via digital download. The full album was to be released in CD form in late 2007.

In July 2007, the band announced on its website that they were at work on a documentary film, The Story of Brian O'Neal and The BusBoys, directed by Ruth Robinson.

Director Richard Linklater used the Bus Boys song "Minimum Wage" in the soundtrack for his 2016 film Everybody Wants Some!!

== Discography ==
=== Studio albums ===
Year	Title	Peak chart positions
Year	Title	US
1980	Minimum Wage Rock & Roll	85
1982	American Worker	139
1988	Money Don't Make No Man	-
2000	(Boys Are) Back in Town	-

=== Soundtrack appearances ===
Year	Title	Peak chart positions	Film/Soundtrack
Year	Title	US	Film/Soundtrack
1982	"The Boys Are Back In Town"	-	48 Hrs.
1982	"48 Hrs."	-	48 Hrs.
1982	"Love Songs Are For Crazies"	-	48 Hrs.
1982	"New Shoes"	-	48 Hrs.
1984	"Cleanin' Up the Town"	68	Ghostbusters
2016	"Minimum Wage"	-	Everybody Wants Some!!
