= Sammy Hagar =

American rock musician (born 1947)

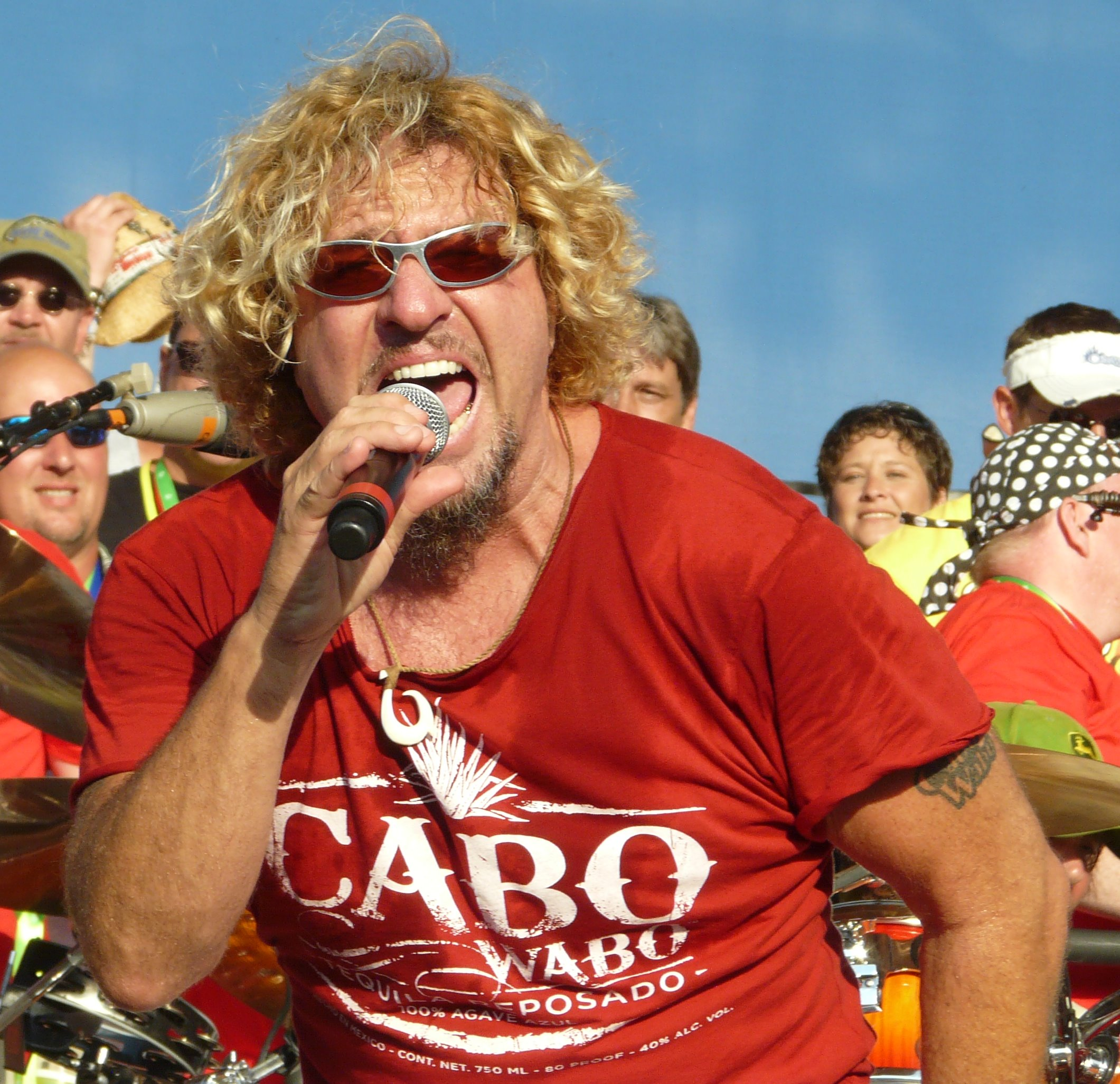
- Hagar performing in 2008

Background information
- Also known as: The Red Rocker
- Born: Samuel Roy Hagar; October 13, 1947 (age 79); Salinas, California, U.S.
- Genres: Hard rock; heavy metal; glam metal; pop rock
- Occupations: Singer; songwriter; musician
- Instruments: Vocals; guitar
- Years active: 1972–present
- Labels: Capitol; Geffen; MCA; Cabo Wabo; Beyond Music; Loud & Proud; Roadrunner; Silverline; earMUSIC; 33rd Street
- Member of: Sammy Hagar & the Waboritas; Chickenfoot; Sammy Hagar and the Circle
- Formerly of: Montrose; Van Halen; HSAS; Planet Us
- Website: redrocker.com

Samuel Roy Hagar (born October 13, 1947), also known as the Red Rocker, is an American singer, songwriter, guitarist, and entrepreneur. He rose to prominence in the early 1970s with the hard rock band Montrose before launching a successful solo career, scoring a hit in 1984 with "I Can't Drive 55". He enjoyed further commercial success as the second lead vocalist of Van Halen from 1985 through 1996, and from 2003 to 2005.

In 2007 Hagar was inducted into the Rock and Roll Hall of Fame as a member of Van Halen. His musical style primarily consists of hard rock and heavy metal.

A lifelong entrepreneur, Hagar has founded four spirits brands and 13 restaurants. In 2008, with his wife, Kari Hagar, he founded a private non-profit focused on children's causes and hunger relief, the Hagar Family Foundation.

== Early life ==
Hagar was born on October 13, 1947, to Robert Alton "Bobby" Hagar and Alberta "Gladys" Baio Hagar in Salinas, California, and was named after his maternal grandfather, Sam Roy Baio. He is of Irish and Italian descent. His family worked in the lettuce fields and he lived with his parents and three siblings in a labor camp until moving south to Fontana, California. There, his father Bobby had landed a job at the Kaiser Steel Mill, working in the open hearth. Bobby Hagar was an alcoholic boxer who held a record for being knocked down 20 times in a single fight. Friends said he was "mentally damaged" upon returning home from fighting in World War II. "My father was the town drunk," said Hagar, who described his father as "a complete alcoholic and madman" who was abusive toward his wife. Hagar's mother would occasionally take the children to a nearby orange grove to sleep in the car when their father became too violent. The Hagar family moved frequently, as Bobby had a habit of spending the rent money on alcohol; Hagar recalls living in nine different homes in Fontana while growing up. When Hagar was ten years old, his mother Gladys took the children and left Bobby for good.

Growing up, Hagar would pick fruit, deliver newspapers, and mow lawns to earn money. He excelled academically and discovered music while in high school, teaching himself to play guitar on a $29.95 instrument his mom purchased him from a Sears and Roebuck catalog in 1962. He fronted his first band, the Fabulous Castilles, when he was 14 years old. At age 17, Hagar went to San Bernardino and snuck in to see the 1964 US debut of the Rolling Stones at the Swing Auditorium. He also regularly attended concerts by surf guitarist Dick Dale at the Riverside National Guard Armory.

After graduating from high school, Hagar "wanted to get out of Fontana as quickly as I could". He moved to nearby Riverside and played in a handful of local bands, while also landing a job running the music department at a local store. Hagar first joined the Johnny Fortune Band as lead vocalist and rhythm guitarist and subsequently played in a string of other pre-Montrose bands including Big Bang, Skinny, Dustcloud, Cotton, Jimmy, the Justice Brothers, and Manhole. The Justice Brothers were the house band at a bar called "The Nightclub" in San Bernardino, before they relocated to San Francisco. During this period in Riverside, Hagar met drummer David Lauser, who would become his friend and musical partner for decades to come. Hagar then married and moved to San Francisco.

At some point after landing in San Francisco, two members of his band were arrested on drug charges, and Hagar found himself broke and without a band. He subsequently spent several months driving a dump truck for his father-in-law in New York as a means of supporting himself until he could put a new band together.

In 1970, Hagar returned to Fontana with his wife and new baby, pursuing a career in music full-time. While in Fontana, he claims he was visited by "a ship and two creatures inside of this ship" while he lay in bed one night. "And they were connected to me, tapped into my mind through some kind of mysterious wireless connection", he said of the experience, adding "I was kind of waking up. They said, in their communication to each other, no words spoke, 'Oh, he's waking up. We've got to go.' They fired off a numerical code, but it was not of our numerical system. All of a sudden, pow, the connection instantly broke." The experience affected Hagar deeply and led him to travel to Yucaipa, California, to consult a psychic, who told Hagar that he needed to go back to San Francisco where fame was awaiting him.

== Musical career ==
=== Montrose (1973–1975) ===
While playing in a San Francisco cover band, Hagar was discovered and recruited to join Montrose, a new band being put together by noted session guitarist Ronnie Montrose. Hagar appeared on the band's debut and sophomore albums, which included the first song Hagar ever wrote, "Bad Motor Scooter". After conflicts arose between himself and Ronnie Montrose during a European tour, Hagar was fired. Bassist Bill Church, whom Montrose had fired after the first album, and drummer Denny Carmassi eventually followed Hagar out of Montrose, playing with his backing band as he embarked on a solo career.

=== Solo career (1976–1987, 1997, 2008, 2013–2014) ===
By the late 1970s, Hagar was enjoying moderate success as a solo artist on Capitol Records under the tutelage of A&R man Carter, with such albums as Nine on a Ten Scale and hits such as "Red", which would build his persona and style, leading to his nickname as "the Red Rocker". However, Hagar felt that Carter did not play to his strengths as "a heavy-metal guy" and instead tried to generate Top 40 hits (such as a cover of Otis Redding's "(Sittin' On) The Dock of the Bay") with little success. Hagar opened for Boston during their 1978/1979 "Don't Look Back" tour, and was scheduled to continue in San Bernardino, California. Prior to the show, Hagar was replaced on the bill by the up-and-coming Los Angeles club band the Knack. Hagar split with Carter for his 1979 Street Machine album which he self-produced. But after it and 1980's Danger Zone failed to break out, Hagar felt that Capitol was not supporting him sufficiently.

Hagar also penned songs that became hits for other bands, notably the top 10 rocker for Rick Springfield, "I've Done Everything for You". Bette Midler recorded two Hagar songs, "Keep on Rockin" and "Red".

Eddie Van Halen approached Hagar when they played a festival together in 1978 and told him that Montrose was his favorite band, referring to himself as a "Montrose freak". Hagar has said that Eddie had been heavily influenced by Montrose, saying "Not his soloing as much as the chording – yeah, he took some of that big open chord thing [from Montrose]. The big open A, the big open D, the big open E. Everything as open as you could make it, to make it as heavy as possible with one guitar. And that was pretty much Ronnie's style, too."

Hagar left Capitol for the newly formed Geffen Records and made some personnel changes, including enlisting long-time friend and former Justice Brothers bandmate David Lauser as his drummer. His first Geffen release, Standing Hampton, was his biggest-selling album to date and went platinum on the strength of songs such as "There's Only One Way to Rock". The follow-up, Three Lock Box, generated his first pop Top 40 hit single and his highest-charting solo single on the Billboard Hot 100, "Your Love Is Driving Me Crazy", which peaked at No. 13 in early 1983.

Hagar continued to enjoy commercial success in the 1980s, with perhaps his best-known song, "I Can't Drive 55", from his 1984 album VOA, reaching No. 26 on the Billboard Hot 100 Singles Chart and garnering heavy AOR airplay. By this time, Hagar had become a headlining act in many parts of the United States and Europe.

In 1987, Hagar had his first No. 1 hit on the Billboard Album Rock Tracks with "Give to Live" from I Never Said Goodbye, released after he had joined Van Halen.

=== HSAS (1983–1984) ===
In 1983 and 1984, Hagar and guitarist Neal Schon of Journey formed the supergroup HSAS (Hagar Schon Aaronson Shrieve) along with former Foghat bassist Kenny Aaronson and former Santana drummer Michael Shrieve. HSAS did a small Christmas tour to benefit local charities and released an album, Through the Fire. The tracks which appeared on the album were recorded live, but crowd noise was removed during the mixing process to create the feel of a studio album. As intended from its start, HSAS was a short-lived project. One song in particular, a cover of "A Whiter Shade of Pale", received some airplay, peaking at No. 94 on the Billboard Hot 100 Singles chart as "Top of the Rock" became an under-the-radar airplay favorite on AOR stations and in markets such as Seattle.

=== Van Halen (1985–1996) ===
After parting ways with vocalist David Lee Roth in 1985, the remaining members of the band Van Halen contacted many potential replacements. In July, given Eddie Van Halen's appreciation of Montrose and at his car mechanic's suggestion, the band auditioned and quickly hired Hagar to fill the opening. With Hagar at the front, Van Halen produced four multi-platinum, number 1 Billboard charting albums: 5150, OU812, For Unlawful Carnal Knowledge, and Balance, as well as many chart hits, including nine number 1 Mainstream Rock hits. During Hagar's stint as Van Halen's vocalist, the band was often informally referred to by fans as "Van Hagar" as a way to distinguish the band from the previous David Lee Roth era.

Internal disputes eventually led to Hagar's departure from the band in June 1996. Hagar disagreed with a decision to record two new tracks for a greatest hits album after the band had agreed to take time off following their 1995 world tour. This issue was pushed by Van Halen's new manager Ray Danniels, Alex Van Halen's brother-in-law, who was brought in after the death of their longtime manager Ed Leffler. Hagar wanted instead to record a new studio album, but only after Eddie, Alex, and Hagar's pregnant wife had all dealt with their respective medical issues. Eventually the band decided to record two songs for the Twister soundtrack. The process was acrimonious and ultimately resulted in only one song, "Humans Being"—the other, "Between Us Two", ended up unfinished and replaced with an instrumental played by Eddie and Alex—along with the end of Hagar's tenure. Among the problems were how Hagar was with his wife in Hawaii, where they had arranged for a natural delivery of the baby, but the couple would eventually relocate to San Francisco after Hagar endured three trips to California to work on the songs, and arguments with Eddie regarding rewriting his lyrics and issuing a greatest hits album. Van Halen would then bring David Lee Roth back to record two new songs for said compilation, Best Of – Volume I. When Van Halen again parted ways with Roth, the band hired Gary Cherone, the former lead singer of Extreme (also managed by Danniels), instead of rehiring Hagar.

=== Los Tres Gusanos (1993–1996, 2002, 2005–present) ===
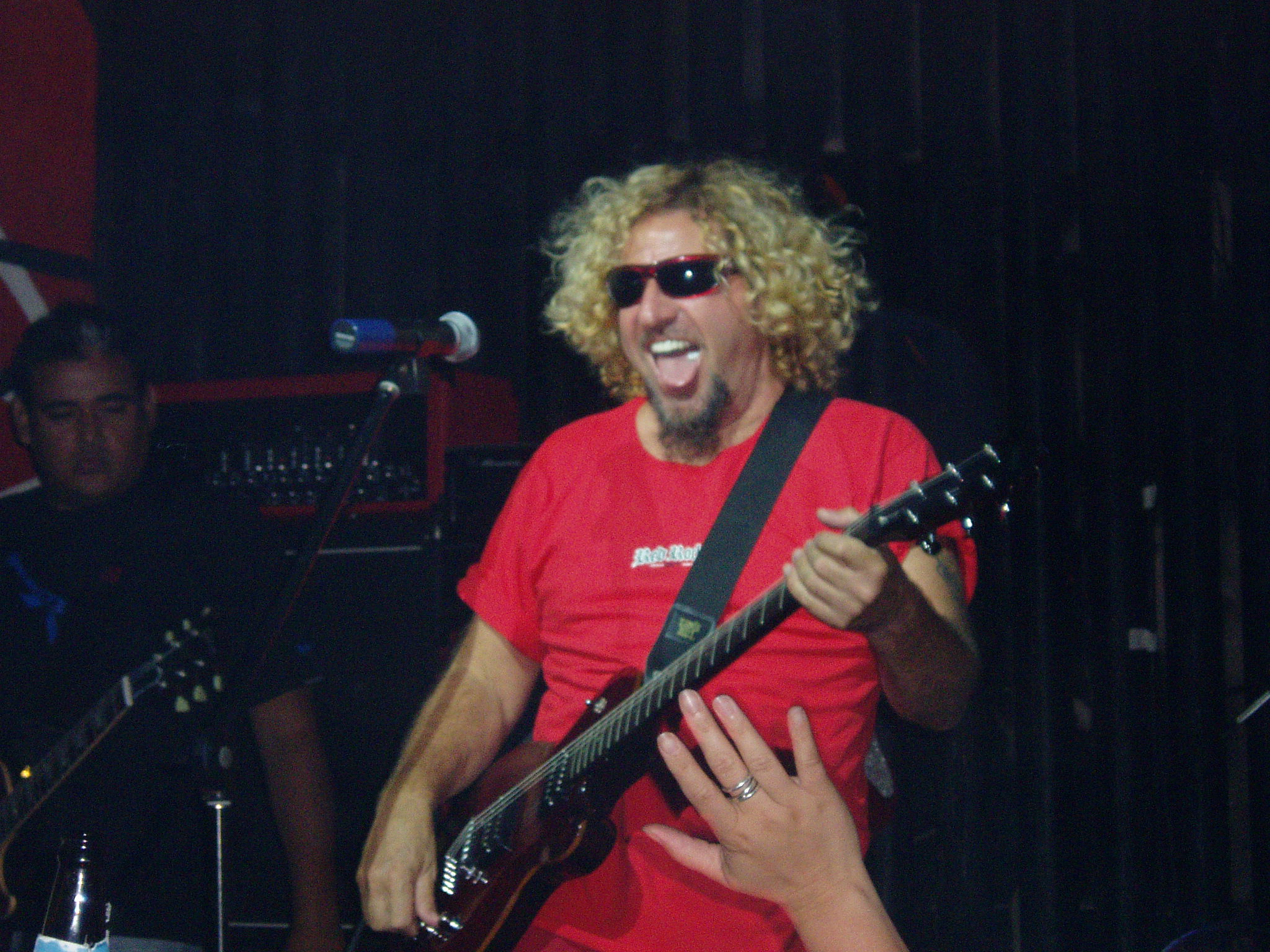
Hagar performing in 2005

Having jammed as a trio in 1992, Hagar, drummer David Lauser, and Van Halen bassist Michael Anthony formed the harmony-singing rock band Los Tres Gusanos (in English, the Three Worms) in 1993. Playing a mixture of Hagar, Van Halen, and cover songs at Cabo Wabo and in San Francisco the band got together a few times a year. Initially active until 1996, Los Tres Gusanos regrouped in 2002, then again in 2005, and has performed together many times since. Lauser has gone on record to say, "Los Tres Gusanos will never die and rumors abound that they may resurface in Cabo soon."

Musician Robert Berry stood in for Michael Anthony in 1996 and 1998 while the bass player fulfilled his touring commitments with Van Halen.

Los Tres Gusanos has played at the BAMMIES (aka the California Music Awards) and is known for its live performances. Similarly, neither band has ever made any official releases, although a number of unofficial bootleg live recordings have been widely circulated on CD and download, though these tend to be credited to Van Halen even when Hagar refers to Los Tres Gusanos by name during the recorded performances. In 2021, Hagar claimed that, during the early years of Los Tres Gusanos' formation, he was offered a spot singing for metal band Pantera that did not come to fruition.

=== Sammy Hagar & the Waboritas (1996–2005) ===
Hagar produced several solo records after the split with Van Halen in 1996. He hit No. 1 on the Mainstream Rock Tracks chart in 1997 with "Little White Lie". In 1999, he formed a long-term band, called the Waboritas: David Lauser returned on drums, as did Jesse Harms on keyboards, and new to the mix was former Bus Boys guitarist Vic Johnson, and former Tommy Tutone bassist Mona Gnader. Subsequent tours were known for spontaneity; such as improvising "Folsom Prison Blues" by Johnny Cash at the IC Light Amphitheatre in Pittsburgh after the noise of a train disturbed the show.

In the summer of 2002, Roth and Hagar teamed up in the Song for Song, the Heavyweight Champs of Rock and Roll Tour (also known as the 'Sans-Halen' or 'Sam & Dave' Tour). The tour attracted media and audience fascination because it seemed more improbable than even a Van Halen tour with Roth or Hagar. The tour drew large crowds and featured no opening acts; Roth and Hagar alternated as the first act. Roth contrasted his personality with Hagar's: "He's the kind of guy you go out with to split a bottle with a friend. I'm the kind of guy you go out with if you want to split your friend with a bottle." Michael Anthony guested with Hagar's Waboritas numerous times and sometimes even sang lead. During performances, Hagar teased Anthony by asking, "Do the brothers know you're here?" Anthony never played with Roth. Gary Cherone appeared on occasion. Hagar released a live album (Live: Hallelujah), featuring vocals by Mike and Gary, and a documentary DVD, Long Road to Cabo, about touring with Roth.

"I thought that tour would be really cool, and it wasn't," Hagar said. "He [Roth] was so pompous and demanding. He's a strange guy."

=== Planet Us (2002–2003) ===
In 2002, with Van Halen still unreformed at this point, Hagar joined again with guitarists Neal Schon of Journey and later Joe Satriani to form a new side project called Planet Us, along with Van Halen member Michael Anthony on bass and Deen Castronovo (also of Journey) on drums. Despite having big intentions, the band only recorded two songs and played live a few times before dissolving when Hagar and Anthony reunited with Van Halen. The two songs, "Psycho Vertigo" and "Peephole", would not see release until Schon's Soul SirkUS released "Peephole" on 2003's "World Play" and Hagar's 2008 effort, Cosmic Universal Fashion.

=== Reunion with Van Halen (2003–2005) ===
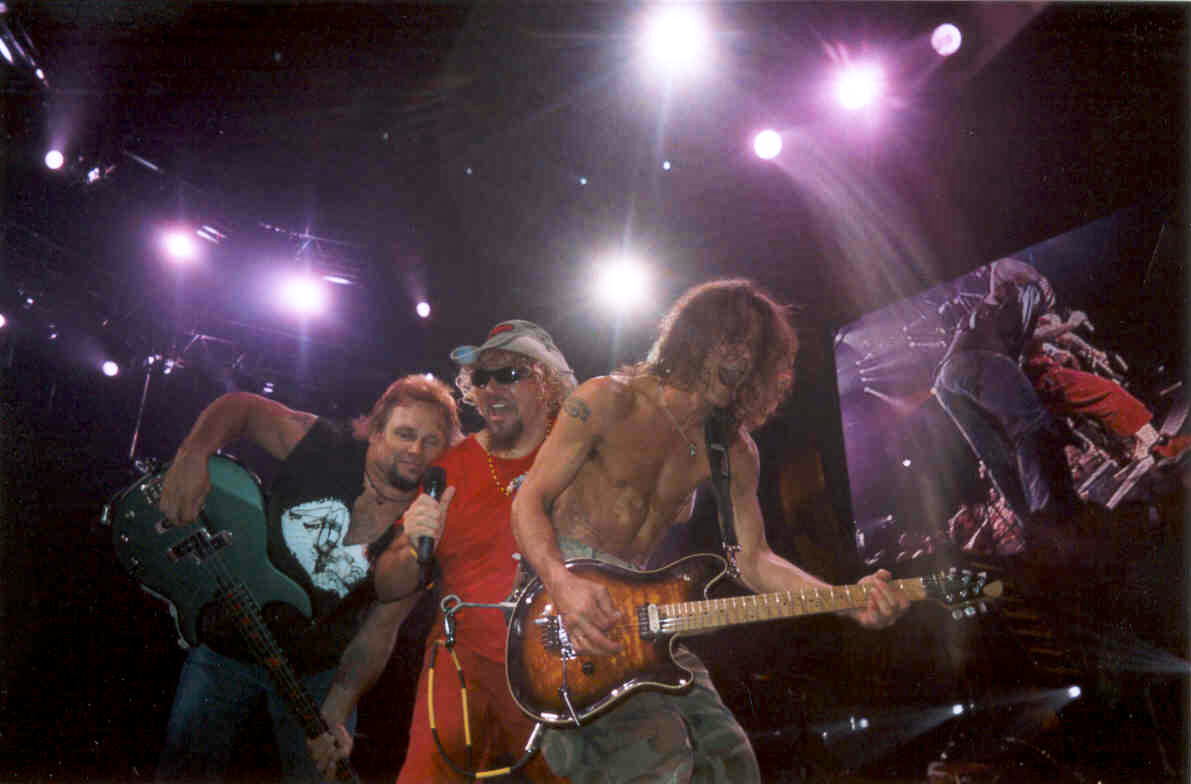
Hagar performing with Van Halen in 2004

After the successful tour with David Lee Roth, Hagar started thinking about his former Van Halen bandmates, calling Alex in late 2003 following a tip from a mutual friend. In 2004, Van Halen toured with Hagar while releasing a 2-CD greatest hits album, titled The Best of Both Worlds, featuring three new Van Halen tracks fronted by Hagar.

The subsequent tour brought on more problems, however, most notably Eddie Van Halen's alleged relapse into alcoholism. The relationship between Hagar and Van Halen eventually got so strained that they completed the tour using two separate charter jets, one for Hagar and Michael Anthony and one for Eddie and Alex. The tour ended with a somewhat infamous final show in Tucson, Arizona. As the show ended, Eddie smashed his guitar on stage sending shrapnel into the audience. This caused tensions backstage after the show, eliminating the possibility of a new album being recorded. Hagar said in an interview (and later confirmed in greater detail in his 2011 autobiography) that Eddie had changed and was not the same person anymore.

=== Sammy Hagar & the Waboritas (2005–present) ===
In 2005, Hagar continued to play with the Waboritas as he toured the Atlantic coast and the Midwest and added ex-Van Halen bass player Michael Anthony. Hagar's 2006 tour with the Waboritas also included a segment with Anthony, playing as a band called the Other Half (a reference to Hagar and Anthony being the half of Van Halen that was not Van Halen by name) for a set of songs in the middle of the show, including both Hagar- and Roth-era tunes. Hagar released an album and DVD called Livin' It Up! In St. Louis with the Wabos on July 25, 2006. Hagar has a longstanding and strong relationship with St. Louis. He often credits St. Louis fans and the radio station KSHE in St. Louis with helping to launch his professional career.

=== Chickenfoot (2008–2012) ===
In 2008, Hagar formed a supergroup named Chickenfoot with Michael Anthony, Red Hot Chili Peppers drummer Chad Smith, and guitar virtuoso Joe Satriani. Their self-titled debut album was released in June 2009 and debuted at No. 4 on the Billboard Music Chart.

=== Sammy Hagar and the Circle (2014–present) ===
Hagar formed a new supergroup in 2014, featuring Michael Anthony, Waboritas guitarist Vic Johnson, and drummer Jason Bonham. The group was named Sammy Hagar and the Circle as according to Hagar, "this band has kinda taken me full circle in my career", featuring tracks from his solo hits, along with Montrose, Van Halen, and Chickenfoot. Led Zeppelin songs were also featured in homage to Led Zeppelin due to the fact that Jason is the son of Zeppelin drummer John Bonham. Focusing on Sammy Hagar and the Circle meant Chickenfoot would be put on hiatus, helped by the fact the other supergroup gave Hagar some frustration in "spending a half-million on a record, writ[ing] and record[ing] for six months. It's a lot of work, and then to not sell many records." Sammy Hagar and the Circle began touring in 2014, with a live recording released on the album, At Your Service in May 2015.

In August 2015, it was reported that the Circle were having discussions about making a studio record to follow up their live album, with Hagar stating, "I want to see what [the Circle] can do in the studio, I've got a vibe on what I think this band will be, and it ain't classic rock, believe it or not. I want to play, like American folk rock, with a heavy edge. Remember the Band? Yeah, write lyrics about America, and about the world. I just have a feeling that this band might be able to do that really well. We'll find out." Sammy Hagar and the Circle's debut studio album Space Between was released May 10, 2019, on BMG. The album debuted at No. 4 on the Billboard 200 chart, No. 1 on Billboard's Top Album Sales chart, No. 1 on Billboard's US Independent Albums chart, and No. 1 on Billboard's Top Rock Albums chart. The sales start marked Hagar's third-largest sales week since Nielsen Music began tracking data in 1991.

=== Van Halen tribute tours (2023–2026) ===
On November 14, 2023, Hagar announced that he, as well as former Van Halen bandmate Michael Anthony would embark on a tour celebrating the catalogue of the band's period with Hagar as vocalist, titled the "Best of All Worlds" tour. Alongside Hagar and Anthony were Joe Satriani, an established collaborator through Chickenfoot, and drummer Jason Bonham, who plays with Hagar and Anthony in the Circle. Staged for the summer of 2024, the run stretched through the midwestern, southern, and northeastern United States, with Loverboy serving as the opening act. On August 27, 2024, with three dates before the end of the tour, Bonham was suddenly replaced prior to the band's concert in Cincinnati by Kenny Aronoff, who had previously substituted in Chickenfoot. Later, Bonham cited family health issues as the reason for his departure, and Hagar was forced to carry on with Aronoff due to scheduling obligations. Aronoff remained with Hagar, Anthony and Satriani as they announced a Las Vegas residency at MGM Park Dolby Live for April and May 2025, themed again around the 1986–1995 Van Halen catalogue, as well as select picks from the David Lee Roth era.

Following these Las Vegas dates, as well as another run in March 2026, the group embarked on an abbreviated 12–date tour across the east coast and midwest during the summer of 2026 with Rick Springfield as support. Hagar announced prior to the run that it would be his final major tour, preferring the format of residencies. Again in September 2026, the group performed a series of shows in Las Vegas, after which Hagar made the announcement that he would move on from Van Halen–centric sets.

== Other ventures ==
=== Television appearances ===
- In 1998, Hagar made a one-time guest appearance in the CBS police drama Nash Bridges, assuming the role of a bartender in a gay bar for the season 4 episode "Imposters".
- In 2007, Hagar starred in a number of National Automotive Parts Association (NAPA) commercials with Nextel Cup drivers Michael Waltrip and Dale Jarrett. The campaign centered around Hagar's song "I Can't Drive 55", changing the words to "I Can't Drive the 55", a reference to Waltrip's car number 55.
- Hagar covered the Patti Smith song "Free Money" early in his career. In 2007, Smith and Van Halen were both inducted into the Rock and Roll Hall of Fame. "Free Money" was prominently featured in a video montage of Smith's performances. At the end of the induction show, Hagar jammed with Smith to her song "People Have the Power".
- Hagar appeared in Celebrity Ghost Stories on The Biography Channel. He told of how he was awakened by his estranged father, drunkenly pounding on his door and demanding to see his new grandson. Hagar angrily sent him away. Moments later, the loud knocking resumed but when Hagar opened the door, it was a bandmate telling him that his father had been found dead earlier that night.
- Hagar made a guest appearance with Chickenfoot on the Aqua Teen Hunger Force episode "IAMAPOD" in 2010.
- In 2012, Hagar appeared in episode 30 of the third season of American Restoration in which he commissioned Rick to create a custom rum dispenser out of a restored vintage refrigerator.
- Hagar made an animated guest appearance in "Covercraft", a 2014 episode of The Simpsons.
- Hagar acted as a guest mentor on Adam Levine's team on the 11th season of the NBC talent show, The Voice.

=== Business interests ===
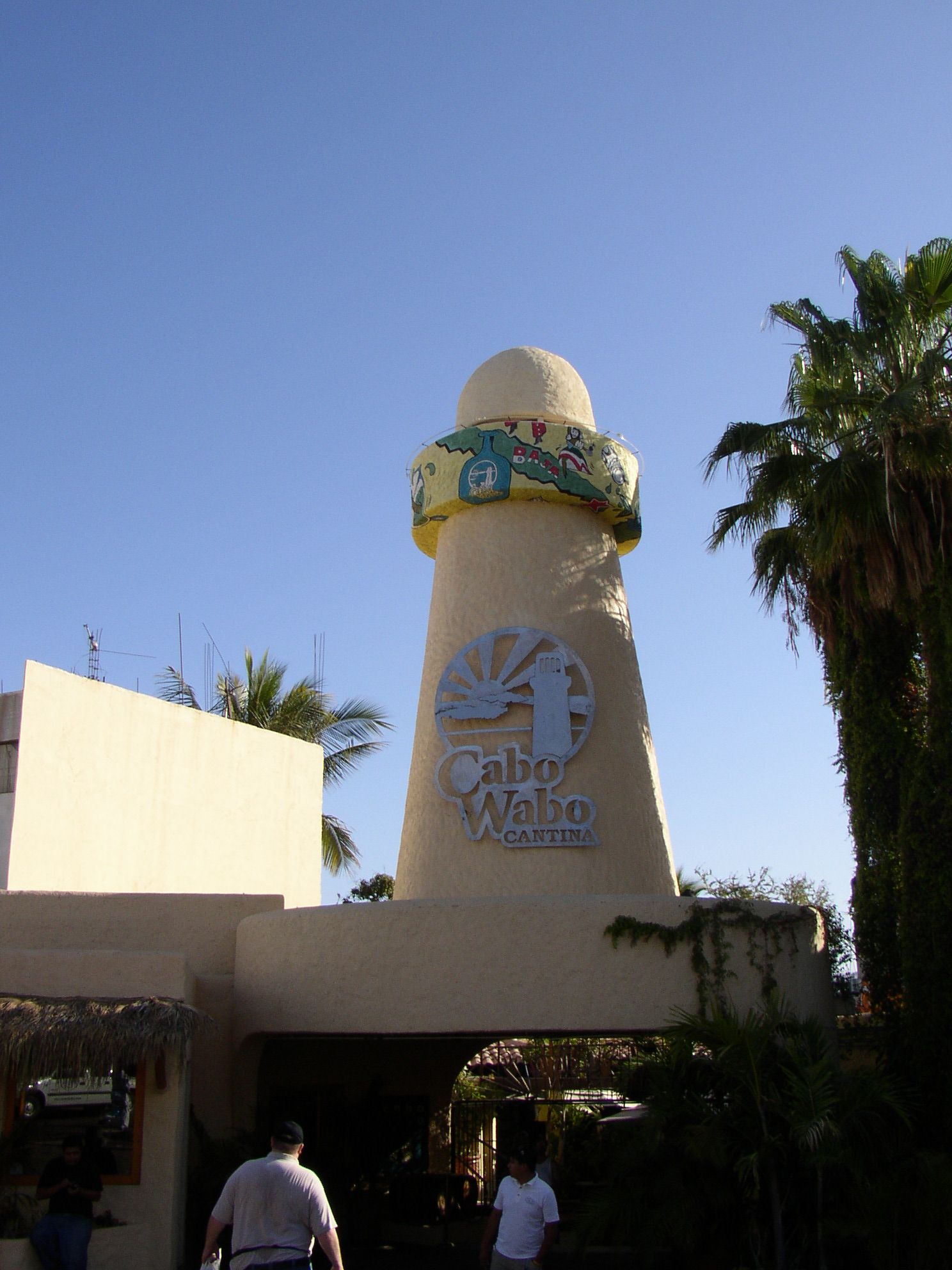
Exterior view of Hagar's Cabo Wabo restaurant and nightclub in Cabo San Lucas, Mexico

In the 1990s, Hagar bought a mountain bike store and built another one named Sausalito Cyclery, soon rated the number 1 independent bike store in California. Hagar designed a mountain bike called the "Red Rocker", built with a red frame by Gary Fisher and black components with no chrome. Hagar owns a nightclub and restaurant in Cabo San Lucas, Mexico, called Cabo Wabo Cantina, where the video for the 1999 hit song "Mas Tequila" (from the 1999 Red Voodoo album) was filmed. Hagar plays at the club during his annual autumn "Birthday Bash". Hagar also has opened another nightclub in the franchise in Lake Tahoe, Nevada, and markets a highly successful line of premium tequilas by the same Cabo Wabo name. Cabo Wabo Cantina opened in Fresno on August 29, 2008. However, it closed a few months later when the operator had a falling out with Hagar.

In early 2009, Hagar opened "Sammy's Beach Bar & Grill" at Harrah's Casino in St. Louis. He opened other locations at the McCarran Airport in Las Vegas, Hopkins International Airport in Cleveland, Kahului Airport in Maui, and the Daniel K. Inouye International Airport in Honolulu. Hagar donates all of the profits of both locations to local charities.

It was announced on May 7, 2007, that Hagar was selling an 80% interest in his Cabo Wabo Tequila to Gruppo Campari, the world's seventh-largest spirits company, for $80 million (equivalent to $124,200,000 in 2025). Skyy Spirits of San Francisco, a vodka producer and subsidiary of Milan's Gruppo Campari will market Cabo Wabo globally, with continued participation by Hagar. Gerry Ruvo, president and chief executive of Skyy Spirits said "Sammy has done a fantastic job building the brand, so we are going to obviously spend time with him and work with him to continue our efforts to take the brand to an even larger level, both here in the U.S. and, more important, globally." Ruvo said Great Britain, Spain, Australia, Southeast Asia, Japan, Germany, and Italy are considered key expansion markets for Tequila. Hagar created Cabo Wabo Tequila to serve patrons at his Cabo Wabo Cantina in Cabo San Lucas, Mexico. He began to distribute it in 1999. In 2007, his company sold 147,000 cases, making it the second-best-selling premium Tequila in the United States, he said in a telephone interview. Cabo Wabo Enterprises, based in Novato, California, earned about $60 million in sales in 2007. In 2010, he sold the remaining 20% interest in Cabo Wabo Tequila to Gruppo Campari for $11 million (bringing the total to $91 million).

In the summer of 2010, Hagar opened a beach bar at the Ballys Casino on the Atlantic City beach, which suffered extensive damage in Hurricane Sandy, and was not reopened.

When asked how he has balanced being a rock star and tequila mogul, Hagar responded: "I always had other people doing everything. It was my palate and my concept. I would go in taste and say, 'Leave this in the barrel a little bit longer.' That was my job. I could do that right before I went on stage. That's a perfect time to do it, as a matter of fact!" In November 2011, Hagar launched Sammy's Beach Bar Rum in Hawaii. It is distilled on Maui by Hali'imaile Distilling Company. It is currently being rolled out to other North American markets.

In 2009, Hagar and celebrity chef Tyler Florence opened a restaurant together in Mill Valley, California. Called El Paseo, it is a steakhouse, with Hagar's contribution being focused on the wine and music selection.

In 2015, Hagar launched a weekly radio show called Sammy Hagar's Top Rock Countdown, supported by Envisage Radio Group, where he puts together various-genre playlists of his favorite songs. As of August 2018, the show has been syndicated across 90 radio stations.

In 2016, Hagar launched a new television program on Mark Cuban's network AXS TV. The show, Rock & Roll Road Trip with Sammy Hagar, follows Sammy around on the road talking with musical and entertainment guests as well as a jam session on each episode. Season Four kicked off in May 2019. The first episode of Season 5 aired in April 2020. Due to the coronavirus outbreak, production was paused but will resume when it can be done safely.

In 2019, Hagar teamed up with Guy Fieri to launch Santo tequila brand.

=== Author ===
In March 2011, Hagar released an autobiography entitled Red: My Uncensored Life in Rock, written with the assistance of rock critic Joel Selvin. On April 3, 2011, it reached No. 1 on the New York Times Best Seller list of hardcover nonfiction.

During an interview with the American Rock Scene, Hagar announced the forthcoming paperback version of Red would include an additional chapter, stating that he "didn't want to release the same book again."

In September 2015, Hagar released the cookbook Are We Having Any Fun Yet? – The Cooking & Partying Handbook. The book contains food and drink recipes, along with pictures and stories of Hagar's cooking memories.

== Backing bands ==
Though time spent in Van Halen interrupted Hagar's solo career, he briefly returned to the studio with solo material in 1987 and 1993.

=== Sammy Hagar and the Circle (2014–present) ===
- Vic Johnson – guitar, backing vocals
- Michael Anthony – bass, backing vocals
- Jason Bonham – drums

=== The Waboritas (2003, 2004–2009, 2010–present) ===
- Vic Johnson – guitar, backing vocals (1997–2003, 2004–2009, 2010–present)
- Mona Gnader – bass, backing vocals (1997–2003, 2004–2009, 2010–present)
- Kenny Aronoff – drums (2026–present)

=== Former band members ===
- Bill Church – bass, backing vocals (1976–1985)
- Alan Fitzgerald – keyboards (1976–1979)
- David Lewark – guitar, backing vocals (1976–1977)
- Scott Mathews – drums (1976–1977)
- Gary Pihl – guitar, backing vocals (1977–1985)
- Chuck Ruff – drums (1977–1980)
- Denny Carmassi – drums (1977, 1997)
- Glenn Ross Campbell – guitar, backing vocals (unknown)
- Billy Carmassi – drums (unknown)
- Geoff Workman – keyboards, backing vocals (1980)
- David Lauser – drums (1981–1985, 1987, 1993, 1997–2003, 2004–2009, 2010–2022)
- Jesse Harms – keyboards, backing vocals (1984–1985, 1987, 1997–2003)
- Jonathan Pierce – bass, backing vocals (1993, 1997)
- Joe Satriani – guitar (2023–2026)
- Jason Bonham – drums (2023–2024)
- Kenny Aronoff – drums (2024–2026)
- Rai Thistlethwayte – keyboards, backing vocals (2024–2025)
- Greg Phillinganes – keyboards, backing vocals (2025)
- Nathan Mercado – keyboards, backing vocals (2026)

== Equipment ==
Hagar previously endorsed Yamaha guitars, which produced a line of Hagar signature guitars named the Yamaha AES620 SH. The guitar is based on Yamaha's AES620 and features a number of modifications requested by Hagar, including a Seymour Duncan JB pickup in the bridge position, a "Cabo Wabo" inlay at the 12th fret and custom translucent red finish. In addition to his signature model, Hagar also plays a handmade AES920 solid-body guitar. Previously, Hagar collaborated with Washburn Guitars, which made a Hagar signature guitar named Washburn RR150, which featured Seymour Duncan pickups and a piezo pickup incorporated into the bridge. In recent years, Hagar has switched to Gibson Guitars, having two signatures by them: the "Red Rocker" Les Paul, and the Sammy Hagar Explorer.

Hagar has used Crate Amplifiers, which marketed a Hagar signature 120-watt amplifier named Crate BV120RH Red Voodoo Amp Head. Currently, he uses Blackstar and Marshall amps, making use of the Marshall Vintage Modern 2466 head and Blackstar Series One 100-watt head.

== Personal life ==
Hagar married his first wife, Betsy Berardi, on November 3, 1968. They have two sons. In 1994, the couple divorced after 26 years of marriage. He married his current wife, Kari Hagar, on November 29, 1995, and together they have two daughters. In 2008, they founded the Hagar Family Foundation, a 501(c)(3) nonprofit focused on children's causes and hunger relief for families in need.

He is the cousin of Christian metal singer Ken Tamplin, who has performed with Joshua, Shout and Magdallan and on his own.

He is a long-time Ferrari enthusiast and owns a 2008 Ferrari 599 GTB Fiorano F1. He owns the 1982 Ferrari 512BB that appeared in his "I Can't Drive 55" music video.

In January 2024, Hagar appeared on an episode of PBS' Finding Your Roots in which he was informed that his Y-DNA did not match any men with the surname Hagar. His Y-DNA matched 27 men with the last name Belcher. Further analysis determined that his great-great-grandfather, born in Virginia in 1845, was fathered by a Belcher and not the Hagar named in the paper records.

== Discography ==
=== Studio albums ===
- Nine on a Ten Scale (1976)
- Sammy Hagar (1977)
- Musical Chairs (1977)
- Street Machine (1979)
- Danger Zone (1980)
- Standing Hampton (1982)
- Three Lock Box (1982)
- VOA (1984)
- I Never Said Goodbye (1987)
- Marching to Mars (1997)
- Red Voodoo (1999)
- Ten 13 (2000)
- Not 4 Sale (2002)
- Livin' It Up! (2006)
- Cosmic Universal Fashion (2008)
- Sammy Hagar & Friends (2013)
- Lite Roast (2014)
- Space Between (2019)
- Lockdown 2020 (2021)
- Crazy Times (2022)

=== with Montrose ===
- Montrose (1973)
- Paper Money (1974)

=== with HSAS ===
- Through The Fire (1984)

=== with Van Halen ===
- 5150 (1986)
- OU812 (1988)
- For Unlawful Carnal Knowledge (1991)
- Balance (1995)

=== with Chickenfoot ===
- Chickenfoot (2009)
- Chickenfoot III (2011)
