= The Waboritas =

American rock band

The Waboritas / The Wabos
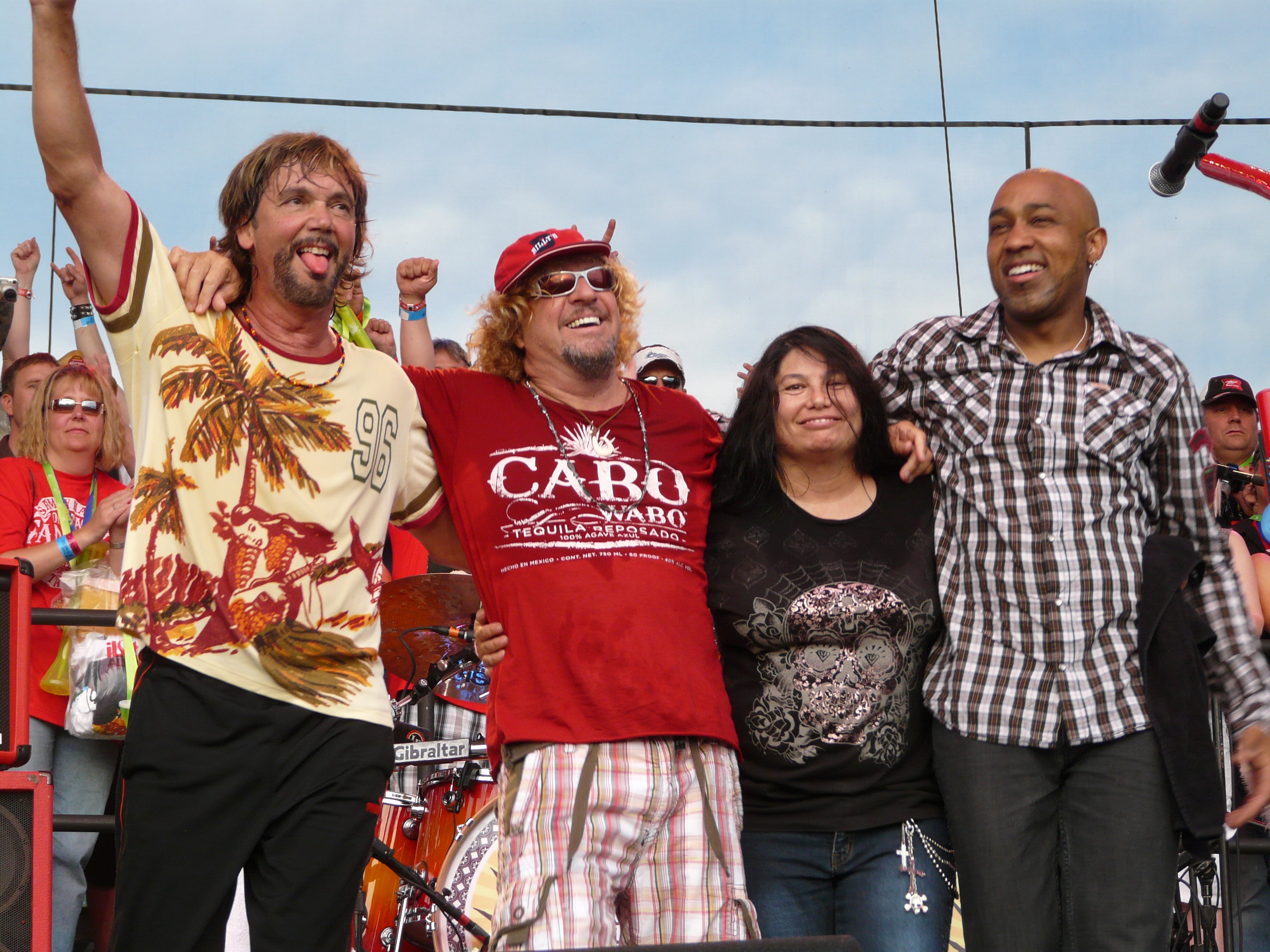
- Sammy Hagar and the Waboritas at the Moondance Jam in July 2008

Background information
- Genre: Hard rock
- Years active: 1997–present
- Label: MCA Records
- Members: Vic Johnson; Mona Gnader; Kenny Aronoff
- Past members: Jesse Harms; David Lauser
- Website: redrocker.com

The Waboritas, also known more recently as The Wabos, are Sammy Hagar's backup band. They were formed in 1997, after Hagar left Van Halen the year prior, and have been active ever since. Their only hiatus was during the Van Halen tour of 2004, during which Hagar kept them fully paid.

They include Sammy Hagar's former Justice Brothers bandmate drummer David Lauser, who played on several of Sammy Hagar's solo albums in the eighties before he left for Van Halen and the more recent formation of The Waboritas. The band also once included keyboardist Jesse Harms, known for appearances on several of Sammy Hagar's previous solo albums as well. For a mid-2000s live tour after Jesse Harms' departure, the band also included percussionist Gibby Ross, who had also done some studio work on the Livin' It Up! album.

Though not a member of the band, former Van Halen bassist Michael Anthony (who was with the band from 1974 to 2006) has made frequent guest appearances with the Wabos. Wabo member Vic Johnson is part of Sammy Hagar and the Circle with Hagar, Anthony, and Jason Bonham.

Sammy Hagar, David Lauser, and Michael Anthony also comprise the harmony-singing rock band Los Tres Gusanos, with whom Vic Johnson often performs as a guest.

Hagar's 2008 album, Cosmic Universal Fashion, is a solo album and not a Waboritas album; this is his first since he began using The Waboritas as a backing band and thus unusual; as on Hagar's last four studio albums he has played with The Wabos on disc and credited the album to both of them. However, the Waboritas are still the main musicians on most of the album's tracks with guest appearances similar to the Marching to Mars format.

Kenny Aronoff appeared in place of longtime Hagar drummer David Lauser at Sammy Hagar's birthday concerts in Cabo San Lucas in 2026. These were the first appearances by the Wabos since 2022.

== Discography ==
=== Studio albums ===
- Red Voodoo (1999)
- Ten 13 (2000)
- Not 4 Sale (2002)
- Livin' It Up! (2006)

=== Live albums ===
- Live: Hallelujah (2003)
