= Hagar Family Foundation =

Private American nonprofit focused on hunger relief

- Formation: 2008
- Founder: Kari Hagar; Sammy Hagar
- Legal status: 501(c)(3) organization
- Purpose: Hunger relief and children's causes
- Headquarters: Novato, California

The Hagar Family Foundation is a 501(c)(3) nonprofit organization founded in 2008 by Sammy and Kari Hagar. Primarily focused on children's causes and hunger relief for families in need, the foundation supports community-based food banks and provides funding for medical research and the care of critically ill children.

== History ==
Raised by a single mother, Hagar and his three siblings grew up in a low-income household in Fontana, California. The family often relied on public assistance from local food banks and other support organizations. In an interview with Marin, Hagar attributed his success, in part, to the financial hardship of his upbringing: "It's where all my drive comes from. I was willing to work hard to ensure I was never poor again." He has since sold more than 60 million albums worldwide and founded four spirits brands and 13 restaurants.

In 2008, Hagar and his wife, Kari, established the Hagar Family Foundation. Among other causes, the foundation provides direct financial aid to community-based food banks; schools and educational programs; pediatric hospitals; and people in need of housing and/or money to pay the expenses associated with the care of critically ill children. As of 2024, the foundation has donated more than $4 million to local and national organizations.

== Charitable initiatives ==
=== Food relief ===
The Hagar Family Foundation has made direct donations to food banks on every tour date in every US city where Hagar has performed since 2008 and additionally donates to charities in the four cities where Hagar's airport restaurants are located. The food banks that are selected circumvent red tape to provide people with reliable and immediate food relief. Hagar said: "I want to give a dollar to somebody and have it go right into their pocket. I want to put food on the table."

In addition to direct donations, the Hagar Family Foundation works to bring attention to the need for local hunger relief in tour markets; among other awareness-raising efforts, a version of the video for the Van Halen song "Right Now" that incorporated information about community food banks was created. In several cities, the foundation raised both awareness and money by offering tickets for lawn seats at Hagar shows in exchange for donations to local charities. In St. Louis more than 10,000 seats were given away. The Hagar Family Foundation also sponsored "Blessings in a Backpack" at nine schools in St. Louis; the program provided a weekend's worth of healthy food that needy students picked up in backpacks every Friday and returned every Monday.

=== UCSF Benioff Children's Hospital, Acoustic-4-A-Cure, pediatric medicine ===
The Hagars' philanthropic relationship with the UCSF Benioff Children's Hospital began when a friend of Hagar's was diagnosed with a brain tumor. Hagar subsequently met Jean Nakamura, a physician and scientist at the hospital conducting research to reduce the mortality rate of babies born with brain tumors. In 2014, in association with the Hagar Family Foundation, Hagar teamed with Metallica's James Hetfield to create Acoustic-4-A-Cure, a concert to benefit pediatric brain tumor research at UCSF Benioff Children's Hospital. The inaugural Acoustic-4-A-Cure concert was held at San Francisco's Fillmore Theater on May 16, 2014. In addition to Hagar and Hetfield, it featured performances by "five decades of rock royalty," including Billie Joe Armstrong of Green Day, Heart's Nancy Wilson, Pat Monahan of Train and Joe Satriani. The sold-out concert raised $100,000 to underwrite the cost of adding two research assistants at Nakamura's lab. Hetfield worked with Hagar on Acoustic-4-A-Cure in 2014, 2015, and 2016.

As of 2024, eight Acoustic-4-A-Cure concerts have taken place with performances by artists including Michael Anthony, Joan Baez, Kevin Cronin, Melissa Etheridge, Mick Fleetwood, Dave Grohl, Taylor Hawkins, Chris Isaak, Kris Kristofferson, Tommy Lee, John Mayer, Sarah McLachlan, Pat Benatar and Neil Geraldo, Linda Perry, Adam Sandler, Chad Smith, Rick Springfield, Taj Mahal and Don Was. Bob Weir played at and co-presented Acoustic-4-A-Cure in 2018, 2019, and 2023. The concerts have raised more than $1,000,000 for UCSF Benioff Children's Hospital since 2014.

=== Additional giving ===
The Hagar Family Foundation has also made donations to Children's Hospital of Orange County; Tilly's Life Center; Miracle Flight For Kids, which provides free flights to children for life-saving medical care; HUGS, an organization that supports families with critically ill children; the Nevada Cancer Institute; Emeril Lagasse Foundation; Farm Aid; Johnson & Wales University; the Hana Maui Youth Center; Second Opinion; and the Keiki Aloha Fund, a program that provides financial support to families of Maui children who were treated off island for major medical conditions. The foundation has supported Keep Memory Alive and its Power of Love Gala, an annual event that benefits the Lou Ruvo Center for BrainHealth at the Cleveland Clinic, since 2008. Hagar enlisted friends including John Mayer, Rick Springfield, Alice Cooper and Kevin Cronin to perform at the 2023 Power of Love event.
