= Street Machine (album) =

Studio album by Sammy Hagar
- Released: August 25th 1979
- Genre: Hard rock
- Length: 41:34
- Label: Capitol
- Producer: Sammy Hagar

Sammy Hagar chronology
All Night Long (1978)	Street Machine (1979)	Danger Zone (1980)

Singles from Street Machine
- 1. "Plain Jane" Released: 1979; 2. "Falling in Love" Released: 1979; 3. "This Planet's on Fire" Released: 1979; 4. "Straight to the Top" Released: 1980

Professional ratings
Review scores
Source	Rating
AllMusic	2.5/5 stars
Record Collector	3/5 stars

Street Machine is the fourth studio album by American rock vocalist Sammy Hagar, released in 1979 by Capitol Records. The album peaked at number 71 on the Billboard 200 album charts on October 20, 1979.

== Song information ==
- The track "Wounded in Love" was co-written by Hagar's then-wife Betsy.
- "Falling in Love" has backing vocals by Brad Delp, Barry Goudreau and Sib Hashian of the group Boston.
- "This Planet's on Fire (Burn in Hell)" was later covered by Megadeth and included on certain editions of their sixteenth studio album, The Sick, the Dying... and the Dead! Hagar sang vocals on the recording.

== Track listing ==
All songs written by Sammy Hagar, except where noted.

1. "Growing Pains" – 3:46
2. "Child to Man" – 4:28
3. "Trans Am (Highway Wonderland)" – 3:46
4. "Feels Like Love" – 4:21
5. "Plain Jane" – 3:49
6. "Never Say Die" – 4:47
7. "This Planet's on Fire (Burn in Hell)" – 4:34
8. "Wounded in Love" (Betsy Hagar, Sammy Hagar) – 3:50
9. "Falling in Love" – 4:44
10. "Straight to the Top" – 3:29

== Personnel ==
- Sammy Hagar – guitar, lead vocals
- Bill Church – bass guitar, background vocals
- Gary Pihl – guitar, background vocals
- Chuck Ruff – drums, background vocals
- Steve Douglas – saxophone
- Mark T. Jordan – piano

== Reissues ==
- The 1996 One Way Records re-release includes a bonus live track, "Miles from Boredom", which was recorded at the Long Beach Arena in Long Beach, California, on July 13, 1980. This was a previously unreleased track from the recordings that were released on Live 1980.
- On May 26, 2009, Rock Candy records re-released the album as a "Collector's Edition: Remaster & Reloaded". The collection contains extensive liner notes, photos and bonus tracks from a 1979 non-album single, "(Sittin' On) The Dock Of The Bay" and "I've Done Everything for You".

== Singles ==
- "Plain Jane" (mono) b/w "Plain Jane" (stereo) - US (Capitol P-4757)
- "Plain Jane" (mono) b/w "Plain Jane" (stereo) - US (Capitol PRO-9189/9190)
- "Plain Jane" b/w "Wounded in Love" - UK (Capitol CL 16101)
- "This Planet's on Fire (Burn in Hell)" b/w "Space Station #5" (live) - UK (Capitol CL 16114)
- "Straight to the Top" b/w "Growing Pains" - US (Capitol 4825)

== Charts ==
Chart (1979)	Peak position
UK Albums (Official Charts)	38
US Billboard 200	71

== Releases ==
- Capitol (US) : ST-11983
- Capitol (Japan) : ECS-81278
- Revolver (1986 UK reissue) : REV LP 72
- Capitol (US) : CDP 748433 2
- BGO (1992 UK reissue) : BGOCD150
- One Way Records (1996 reissue) : 72438 19092 25
- Capitol (1996 Japan reissue) : TOCP-8344
- Rock Candy Records (2009 reissue) : CANDY052
