= Danger Zone (Sammy Hagar album) =

Studio album by Sammy Hagar
- Released: June 1980
- Recorded: 1980
- Studios: Wally Heider Studios, San Francisco, California
- Genre: Hard rock
- Length: 35:09
- Label: Capitol
- Producers: Sammy Hagar; Geoff Workman

Sammy Hagar chronology
Street Machine (1979)	Danger Zone (1980)	Standing Hampton (1982)

Danger Zone is the fifth studio album by American rock vocalist Sammy Hagar, released in June 1980 by Capitol Records. This is his last studio album during his tenure with Capitol Records. The album includes appearances by then Journey singer Steve Perry and guitarist Neal Schon. The album peaked at number 85 on the Billboard 200 album charts on July 12, 1980.

== Song information ==
- "Love Or Money" was a favorite of John Kalodner, which helped serve as a catalyst in getting Hagar signed to the then new Geffen Records.
- The track "In The Night (Entering The Danger Zone)" was inspired by the film Lucifer Rising.
- "Heartbeat" is the second track on which Hagar shares a writing credit with his then-wife, Betsy. The first was "Wounded In Love" on the Street Machine album.
- "Run For Your Life" is a cover of a song from the band Runner's first (and only) album, Runner. This version has the former Journey singer Steve Perry on back-up vocals. It was (co-)produced by Boston's Tom Scholz, who had originally been signed to produce the entire album but was ordered by his own record label to pull out. This song also segues into "Danger Zone".

== Reception ==
Professional ratings
Review scores
Source	Rating
AllMusic	2.5/5 stars

In their retrospective review, AllMusic declared the album a solid effort, pointing out "20th Century Man" and "Run for Your Life" as highlights, but nonetheless determined the album to be "not up to the standard of Sammy Hagar's best material".

== Track listing ==
All tracks are written by Sammy Hagar, except where noted.

Side one
No.	Title	Writer(s)	Length
1.	"Love or Money"		3:00
2.	"20th Century Man"	S. Hagar; Gary Pihl	3:13
3.	"Miles from Boredom"		3:41
4.	"Mommy Says, Daddy Says"		2:33
5.	"In the Night (Entering the Danger Zone)"		5:09

Side two
No.	Title	Writer(s)	Length
6.	"The Iceman"		4:09
7.	"Bad Reputation"		3:29
8.	"Heartbeat"	Betsy Hagar; S. Hagar	3:53
9.	"Run for Your Life" (Runner cover)	Steve Gould; John Pidgeon	4:22
10.	"Danger Zone"		0:40
Total length:			35:09

== Personnel ==
Band

- Sammy Hagar – vocals, guitar
- Bill Church – bass guitar
- Gary Pihl – guitar, keyboards
- Chuck Ruff – drums
- Geoff Workman – keyboards

Guest musicians

- Steve Perry – background vocals on "Love or Money", "The Iceman", "Heartbeat" and "Run for Your Life"
- Neal Schon – guitar solos on "Love or Money"

Production

- Dave Frazer – engineer assistant
- Tom Scholz – inspiration, pre-production arrangements and drum recordings; co-producer of "Run For Your Life"
- Geoff Workman – engineer

== Singles ==
- "Heartbeat" b/w "Miles from Boredom" – US (Capitol 4893)
- "Heartbeat" (stereo) b/w "Heartbeat" (mono) – US (Capitol P-4893)
- "Heartbeat" b/w "Love or Money" – UK (Capitol RED1)
- "Heartbeat" b/w "Love or Money" – Holland (Capitol 1A 006-86200)
- "Run for Your Life" b/w "Love or Money" – Germany (Capitol 006-86 215)

== Charts ==
Chart (1980)	Peak position
UK Albums (Official Charts)	12
US Billboard 200	85

== Releases ==
- Capitol (US) – ST-12069
- BGO (1995 UK reissue) – BGOCD281
- Capitol (Japan) – TOCP-7516
