= Cosmic Universal Fashion =

Studio album by Sammy Hagar
- Released: November 18, 2008
- Genre: Hard rock
- Length: 43:39
- Label: Loud & Proud, Roadrunner
- Producer: Bob Daspit, Sammy Hagar

Sammy Hagar chronology
Livin' It Up! (2006)	Cosmic Universal Fashion (2008)	Sammy Hagar & Friends (2013)

Professional ratings
Review scores
Source	Rating
Allmusic	2/5 stars
Record Collector	3/5 stars
The Toronto Sun	3/5 stars

Cosmic Universal Fashion is the fifteenth studio album by Sammy Hagar, released on November 18, 2008 by Loud & Proud and Roadrunner Records. Shortly after its release, Hagar formed the supergroup Chickenfoot with his former Van Halen bandmate Michael Anthony.

Cosmic Universal Fashion debuted at number 95 on the Billboard 200.

== Song information ==
- The title track was previously released in a different version by Baghdad Heavy Metal in an album called Baghdad Heavy Metal in 2007.
- "Loud" features Michael Anthony, The Cult's Billy Duffy with Guns N' Roses and Velvet Revolver's Matt Sorum.
- Hagar's version of "Fight for Your Right to Party" includes a guest lead vocal by his tour manager, Paul Binder, who is introduced as the character "Bling". Hagar has performed the song live with Bling for years, often infusing "Summertime Blues". In the album's liner notes, Hagar explains that the Beastie Boys would not let him change the lyrics. That being the case, Hagar then says, "Then the teacher was right." (In reference to the Beastie Boys lyric "but your teacher preaches class like you're some kind of jerk".)
- "Psycho Vertigo" and "Peephole" feature the Journey guitarist Neal Schon and drummer Deen Castronovo with the former Van Halen bass guitarist Michael Anthony. Hagar, Schon and Anthony were originally planning to form a new side project called Planet Us after finishing these two tracks but Hagar and Anthony rejoined Van Halen in 2004. "Peephole" was later recorded by Schon's side project band Soul SirkUS.
- "Switch On The Light" features ZZ Top's Billy Gibbons.
- "24365" features the Funkadelic bass guitarist Bootsy Collins on backup vocals.

== Track listing ==
No.	Title	Writer(s)	Length
1.	"Cosmic Universal Fashion"	Sammy Hagar, Steven Lost, David Kahne	3:33
2.	"Psycho Vertigo"	Hagar, Neal Schon	5:03
3.	"Peephole"	Hagar, Schon	4:20
4.	"Loud"	John Eddie	3:55
5.	"Fight for Your Right to Party"	Rick Rubin, Adam Yauch, Adam Horovitz	3:48
6.	"Switch on the Light"	Hagar	3:17
7.	"When the Sun Don't Shine"	Hagar	4:15
8.	"24365"	Hagar	3:58
9.	"I'm on a Roll"	Hagar, Niki Oosterbeen	2:40
10.	"Dreams/Cabo"	Michael Anthony/Hagar/Alex Van Halen/Eddie Van Halen	8:50

== Personnel ==
- Sammy Hagar - lead vocals, guitar
- Michael Anthony - bass guitar, vocals on tracks 2, 3, 4, 5, 10
- Billy Gibbons - vocals on track 6
- Billy Duffy - guitars on track 4
- Matt Sorum - drums, percussion on track 4
- Bootsy Collins - backing vocals on track 8
- Deen Castronovo - drums on tracks 2, 3
- Neal Schon - guitars on tracks 2, 3
- David Lauser - drums on tracks 5, 6, 7, 8, 9, 10
- Vic Johnson - guitar, vocals on tracks 5, 6, 7, 8, 9, 10
- Mona Gnader - bass guitar, vocals on tracks 5, 6, 7, 8, 9, 10
