= David Lauser =

American rock drummer (born 1951)

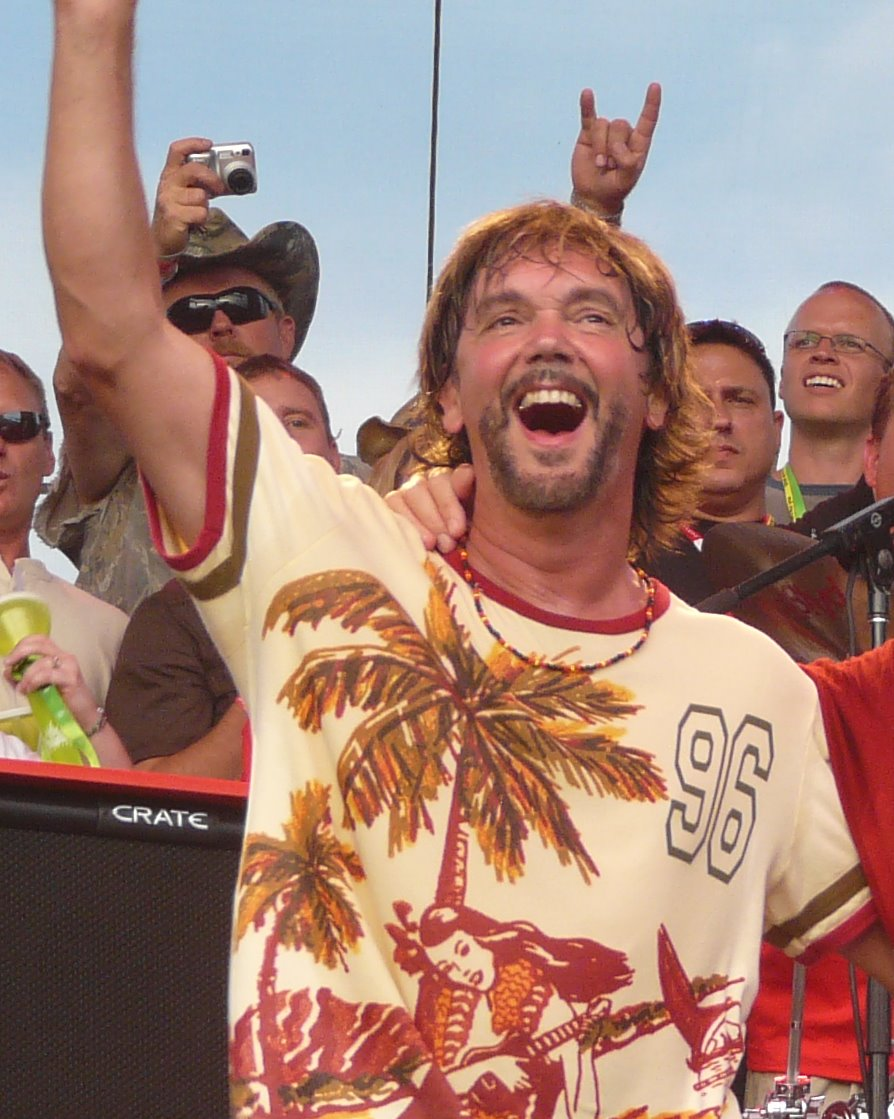
- David Lauser on July 12, 2008 with Sammy Hagar

Background information
- Birth name: David Lauser
- Born: 20 February 1951 (age 74); San Bernardino, California, United States
- Genres: Hard rock, heavy metal
- Instrument: Drums
- Years active: 1971–present

David Lauser (born 20 February 1951) is an American rock drummer, who is most famous for playing with Sammy Hagar.

Sammy Hagar and David Lauser played together in a band called Justice Brothers before Sammy Hagar joined Montrose.

Lauser later played on various Sammy Hagar solo albums, starting with Standing Hampton and is now a member of The Waboritas, also played with Sammy Hagar in Los Tres Gusanos.

Lauser's first marriage to Jacqueline Cushen in 1982 resulted in a daughter, Danielle Marie, also known affectionately as "Ella Bean." In 2002, Lauser married his second wife. On January 4, 2015, his wife Liza Cozad-Lauser died from cancer.

David Lauser continues to tour with Sammy Hagar's Wabos and December People, a charitable rock and roll holidays band.

== Discography ==
=== With Sammy Hagar solo ===
- Standing Hampton
- Three Lock Box
- VOA
- I Never Said Goodbye
- Unboxed
- Cosmic Universal Fashion

=== With Sammy Hagar And The Waboritas ===
- Red Voodoo
- Ten 13
- Not 4 Sale
- Live: Hallelujah
- Livin' It Up

=== With Alliance ===
- Alliance - 1991
- Bond of Union - 1991
- Missing Piece - 1996
- Destination Known - 2007
- Road to Heaven - 2008

== Equipment ==
- DW drums and pedals.
- Paiste cymbals.
- Remo drum heads.
- Vic Firth drum sticks.
- Gibraltar hardware.
