= Standing Hampton =

Studio album by Sammy Hagar
- Released: January 6, 1982
- Recorded: Spring–Summer 1981
- Studios: Goodnight L.A. Studios, Los Angeles
- Genre: Hard rock
- Length: 42:06
- Label: Geffen
- Producer: Keith Olsen

Sammy Hagar chronology
Danger Zone (1980)	Standing Hampton (1982)	Three Lock Box (1982)

Singles from Standing Hampton
- 1. "I'll Fall in Love Again" Released: 1982; 2. "Piece of My Heart" Released: 1982; 3. "There's Only One Way to Rock" Released: 1982; 4. "Baby's on Fire" Released: 1982; 5. "Can't Get Loose" Released: 1982

Standing Hampton is the sixth studio album by American rock vocalist Sammy Hagar, released on January 6, 1982, by Geffen. This was his first album after moving from Capitol Records to Geffen. It was his first album to achieve RIAA certification, eventually going platinum, and five of its singles charted in either the mainstream rock or pop singles charts.

The British version of the album was released with a bonus interview 45 rpm called Conversations with Sammy Hagar (Geffen XPS 133).

== Critical reception ==
Professional ratings
Review scores
Source	Rating
AllMusic	4.5/5 stars
Record Mirror	3/5 stars

Kerrang! reviewer Dante Bonutto praised the album opener "There's Only One Way to Rock" (in British editions it was a first track) and complained that the rest of the songs on the album could not match its energy and originality.

== Title and artwork ==
Hagar has said that he was originally going to call this album One Way To Rock. It was a British fan who told him of the term that came to be the title. In Cockney rhyming slang, a "Hampton" is a substitution for penis (Hampton Wick rhymes with "Dick"). One that is "standing" would be a reference to an erection. This led to the cover art that shows a gentleman greeting a woman in various states of undress. The liner notes on the inner sleeve state that the cover graphics were inspired by the work of Surrealist painter Paul Delvaux. The female model is Patti McGuire, the Playboy Playmate of the Year in 1977. She married tennis player Jimmy Connors in 1979.

== Song information ==
- "I'll Fall in Love Again" was used in the soundtrack to the film Vision Quest.
- A couple of non-album tracks, "Don't Get Hooked" and "Satisfied", appeared as B-sides and have not been released in any other format since.
- "There's Only One Way to Rock" went on to be one of Hagar's biggest solo hits and a signature tune. This song, along with "I Can't Drive 55", were the two Hagar songs that Van Halen consistently played when he joined the band.
- A different version of the song "Heavy Metal" was used for the soundtrack and the animated movie Heavy Metal.
- The lyrics to the song "Inside Lookin' In" refers to "ringin' just like one UXB". UXB is an acronym for an "unexploded bomb".
- The lyrics to "Sweet Hitchhiker" refers to "Blaupunkt blastin' my favorite song". Blaupunkt refers to a popular brand of car stereo.
- "Piece of My Heart" is a cover of the song originally recorded by Erma Franklin and made famous by Janis Joplin.

== Track listing ==
All tracks are written by Sammy Hagar, except where noted.

Side one
No.	Title	Writer(s)	Length
1.	"I'll Fall in Love Again"		4:15
2.	"There's Only One Way to Rock"		4:15
3.	"Baby's on Fire"		3:34
4.	"Can't Get Loose"		5:39
5.	"Heavy Metal"	Hagar; Jim Peterik	3:51

Side two
No.	Title	Writer(s)	Length
6.	"Baby, It's You"		4:46
7.	"Surrender"	Chas Sandford	3:15
8.	"Inside Lookin' In"		4:26
9.	"Sweet Hitchhiker"	Hagar; David Lauser	4:10
10.	"Piece of My Heart" (Big Brother and the Holding Company cover)	Bert Berns; Jerry Ragovoy	3:55
Total length:			42:06

== Charts ==
=== Weekly charts ===
Chart (1982)	Peak position
Canada Top Albums/CDs (RPM)	39
UK Albums (Official Charts)	84
US Billboard 200	28

=== Year-end charts ===
Chart (1982)	Position
US Billboard 200	49

=== Charting singles ===
Year	Single	Chart	Position
1982	"Baby's on Fire"	Billboard Mainstream Rock	35
1982	"Can't Get Loose"	Billboard Mainstream Rock	49
1982	"I'll Fall in Love Again"	Billboard Mainstream Rock	2
1982	"I'll Fall in Love Again"	Billboard Pop Singles	43
1982	"Piece of My Heart"	Billboard Pop Singles	73
1982	"Piece of My Heart"	UK Singles	67
1982	"There's Only One Way to Rock"	Billboard Mainstream Rock	31

== Certifications ==
Region	Certification	Certified units/sales
United States (RIAA)	Platinum	1,000,000^{^}
^{^} Shipments figures based on certification alone.

== Personnel ==
=== Musicians ===
- Sammy Hagar – lead vocals, guitar
- Gary Pihl – guitar, backing vocals
- Bill Church – bass guitar, backing vocals
- David Lauser – drums, backing vocals

=== Production ===
- Keith Olsen – producer, engineer
- Chris Minto – engineer
- Greg Fulginiti – mastering
- Richard Seireeni – art direction

== Releases ==
- Geffen Records (Japan): 25AP 2247
- Geffen Records (Japan): MVCG 21004
- Geffen Records (UK): GEF 85456
- Geffen Records (Holland): GEF 45456
- Geffen Records (Germany): GEFD 02006
