= Not 4 Sale (Sammy Hagar album) =

2002 studio album by Sammy Hagar

Studio album by Sammy Hagar and The Waboritas
- Released: October 8, 2002
- Genre: Hard rock
- Length: 42:04
- Label: Cabo Wabo Music
- Producer: Bob Daspit and the Waboritas

Sammy Hagar and The Waboritas chronology
Ten 13 (2000)	Not 4 Sale (2002)	Live: Hallelujah (2003)

Professional ratings
Review scores
Source	Rating
AllMusic	3.5/5 stars
The Encyclopedia of Popular Music	3/5 stars

Not 4 Sale is the thirteenth studio album by American rock singer Sammy Hagar, and the second album by Hagar's backup band The Waboritas. As it was released in the US on Hagar's own Cabo Wabo Music label, problems arose with distribution; the release date passed without copies being delivered to several national retail chains.

It peaked at #11 on the Billboard Independent Albums chart.

== Song information ==
- "Stand Up" was originally written by Hagar for the film Rock Star. It appears here with new lyrics.
- The studio version of "Hallelujah" is included as the only studio track on Live: Hallelujah. Hagar wanted to give the song another commercial chance since the Not 4 Sale release was plagued with distribution problems.
- "Halfway to Memphis" was later re-recorded as a country song for the Livin' It Up! album.
- "Whole Lotta Zep" is a re-working/medley of three Led Zeppelin songs: "Whole Lotta Love", "Black Dog", and "Kashmir".

== Critical reception ==
AllMusic wrote: "With quite a few rock veterans trying to update their sound with modern touches and failing miserably come the early 21st century, Hagar wisely sticks to his bread and butter on Not 4 Sale".

== Track listing ==
All tracks are written by Sammy Hagar, except where stated

No.	Title	Writer(s)	Length
1.	"Stand Up"		5:58
2.	"Hallelujah"		4:08
3.	"Halfway to Memphis"		4:30
4.	"Things've Changed"	Jesse Harms	4:19
5.	"Whole Lotta Zep" (Medley of Led Zeppelin songs: "Whole Lotta Love," "Black Dog," and "Kashmir")	John Paul Jones, John Bonham, Hagar, Jimmy Page, Robert Plant	3:29
6.	"The Big Nail"		3:29
7.	"Make It Alright"		2:33
8.	"Not 4 Sale"	Hagar, Joe Hutchinson	3:38
9.	"The Big Square Inch"		4:12
10.	"Karma Wheel"		5:48

== Personnel ==
- Sammy Hagar: lead vocals, guitar
- Victor Johnson: guitar
- Jesse Harms: keyboards
- Mona Gnader: bass
- David Lauser: drums, co-lead vocals on "The Big Square Inch"

== Singles ==
- "Things've Changed" (US)

== Versions ==
- 33rd Street Records (US): 33RD ST 3315
- 33rd Street Records (Russia): M3-II/75/2002
- Cabo Wabo Music/Pony Canyon Inc (Japan): PCCY-01674
