= Livin' It Up! =

Studio album by Sammy Hagar and The Waboritas
- Released: July 25, 2006
- Recorded: 2005–2006
- Genre: Rock
- Length: 41:11
- Label: Cabo Wabo Music
- Producer: Bob Daspit

Sammy Hagar and The Waboritas chronology
Live: Hallelujah (2003)	Livin' It Up! (2006)	Cosmic Universal Fashion (2008)

Singles from Livin' It Up!
- 1. "Let Me Take You There" Released: 2005; 2. "Mexico" Released: 11 July 2006

Singles
- Let Me Take You There

Alternative cover
- Mexico

Professional ratings
Review scores
Source	Rating
Allmusic	4/5 stars

Livin' It Up! is the fourteenth studio album by Sammy Hagar and his fourth with the Waboritas. While writing with Kenny Chesney and covering Toby Keith, Hagar began singing about enjoying the life of a beach dweller. It was vaguely reminiscent of Jimmy Buffett's career, and Hagar even used this time as an opportunity to meet more easy-going party fans as he went on a brief tour with Chesney.

== Song information ==
- "I Love This Bar" was previously recorded by Toby Keith for his 2003 album Shock'n Y'all.
- "Rainy Day Women #12 & 35" is a cover of a Bob Dylan song, originally released on his 1966 album Blonde on Blonde.
- The first version of the song "Halfway to Memphis" was recorded for the Hagar's album Not 4 Sale.
- "Let Me Take You There" was called "I'll Take You There" when it was recorded by the soul/gospel family band the Staple Singers. The song was included on the group's 1972 album Be Altitude: Respect Yourself.

== Track listing ==
All tracks are written by Sammy Hagar, except where stated.

No.	Title	Writer(s)	Length
1.	"Sam I Am"	Bob Daspit, Sammy Hagar, Nicole Summerwood	2:56
2.	"Living on a Coastline"		4:20
3.	"Mexico"		3:34
4.	"The Way We Live"		4:39
5.	"I Love This Bar"	Scotty Emerick, Toby Keith	3:41
6.	"One Sip"	Kenny Chesney, Hagar	2:18
7.	"Rainy Day Women #12/#35"	Bob Dylan	3:37
8.	"Halfway to Memphis"		4:23
9.	"Sailin'"		4:21
10.	"Let Me Take You There"	Hagar, Alvertis Isbell	4:24
11.	"Someday"		2:58

== Personnel ==
- Sammy Hagar - lead vocals, guitar
- David (Bro) Lauser - drums, percussion, backing vocals
- Vic (Tore Up) Johnson - electric and acoustic guitar, backing vocals
- Mona Gnader - bass guitar, backing vocals

=== Additional personnel ===
- Gibby Ross - timbales, congas, shaker, cowbell, tambourine
- Bob Daspit - guitar, slide guitar, percussion, backing vocals
- Nicole Summerwood - backing vocals
- Roy Rogers - slide guitar
- Rosendo Rodriguez Mariachi Band
- Tim Hockenberry - trombone, piccolo trumpet
- Austin de Lone - piano
- Dave Zirbel - pedal steel guitar
- Aaron Hagar - backing vocals and lead vocal duet on "Someday"
- Kari Hagar - backing vocals

Technical

- Will Blochinger - photography

== Chart performance ==
The album premiered at #50 on the Billboard Charts in 2006, with 16,000+ sold.
