= Ten 13 =

Studio album by Sammy Hagar
- Released: October 24, 2000
- Recorded: 2000
- Genre: Pop rock; hard rock
- Length: 47:26
- Label: Beyond Music
- Producer: Sammy Hagar, Jesse Harms (as "The Agave Bros.")

Sammy Hagar chronology
Red Voodoo (1999)	Ten 13 (2000)	Not 4 Sale (2002)

Ten 13 is the twelfth solo studio album by American rock singer Sammy Hagar. The title is his date of birth (October 13). It was released on October 24, 2000 by Beyond Music.

== Song information ==
- "Tropic of Capricorn" has an instrumental bonus tacked on the end called "Maui Wowie".

Professional ratings
Review scores
Source	Rating
AllMusic	3/5 stars
Entertainment Weekly	D

== Track listing ==
All tracks are written by Sammy Hagar, except where noted.

No.	Title	Writer(s)	Length
1.	"Shaka Doobie (The Limit)"		3:19
2.	"Let Sally Drive"		4:39
3.	"Serious Juju"		3:50
4.	"The Message"	Jesse Harms	4:33
5.	"Deeper Kinda Love"	Hagar, Larry Dvoskin	4:19
6.	"Little Bit More"	Hagar, James Michael	3:37
7.	"Ten 13"		4:35
8.	"Protection"		4:44
9.	"3 in the Middle"		3:46
10.	"The Real Deal"		3:11
11.	"Tropic of Capricorn"		7:00

Japanese release bonus tracks
No.	Title	Writer(s)	Length
12.	"High and Dry Again" (Live)		6:43
13.	"Serious Juju" (Radio mix)		3:51
14.	"Let Sally Drive" (Edit)		3:58
15.	"Deeper Kinda Love" (Alternative mix)	Hagar, Dvoskin	4:37

== Personnel ==
- Sammy Hagar: lead vocals, guitar
- Victor Johnson: guitar
- Jesse Harms: keyboards
- Mona Gnader: bass
- David Lauser: drums

Additional personnel

- Roy Rogers: slide guitar on "The Real Deal"

== Live and Raw in Cabo ==
Ten 13 was sold with a different bonus disc at both Best Buy and Circuit City retail stores. The mini-CDs were recorded at the Riverport Amphitheater outside of St. Louis, Missouri, on July 21, 2000.

Live And Raw In Cabo Best Buy disc (2000)

=== Best Buy disc ===
1. "Intro" - 0:25
2. "Three Lock Box" (Hagar) - 3:12
3. "Both Sides Now" (Hagar/Harms) - 3:44

Live And Raw In Cabo Circuit City disc (2000)

=== Circuit City disc ===
1. "Intro" - 0:28
2. "Space Station #5" (Hagar/Jim Peterik) - 3:27
3. "High and Dry Again" (Hagar) - 6:34

== Singles ==
- "Serious Juju" b/w "3 in the Middle" US (63985-78160-2)
- "Serious Juju" (Radio edit) b/w "Serious Juju" (Album version) US (63985-78160-2)
- Live and Raw in Cabo US (BYDJ-78166-2)
- Live and Raw in Cabo US (BYDJ-78167-2)
- "Let Sally Drive" (Album version) b/w "Let Sally Drive" (Edit) US (BYDJ-78173-2)
- "Deeper Kinda Love" (Remix) b/w "Deeper Kinda Love" (Remix edit) US (BYDJ-78174-2)

== Versions ==
- Cabo Wabo/Beyond (US): 63985-78110-2
- Cabo Wabo/Beyond (Japan): TECI 24043
