= Vic Johnson (musician) =

Guitarist

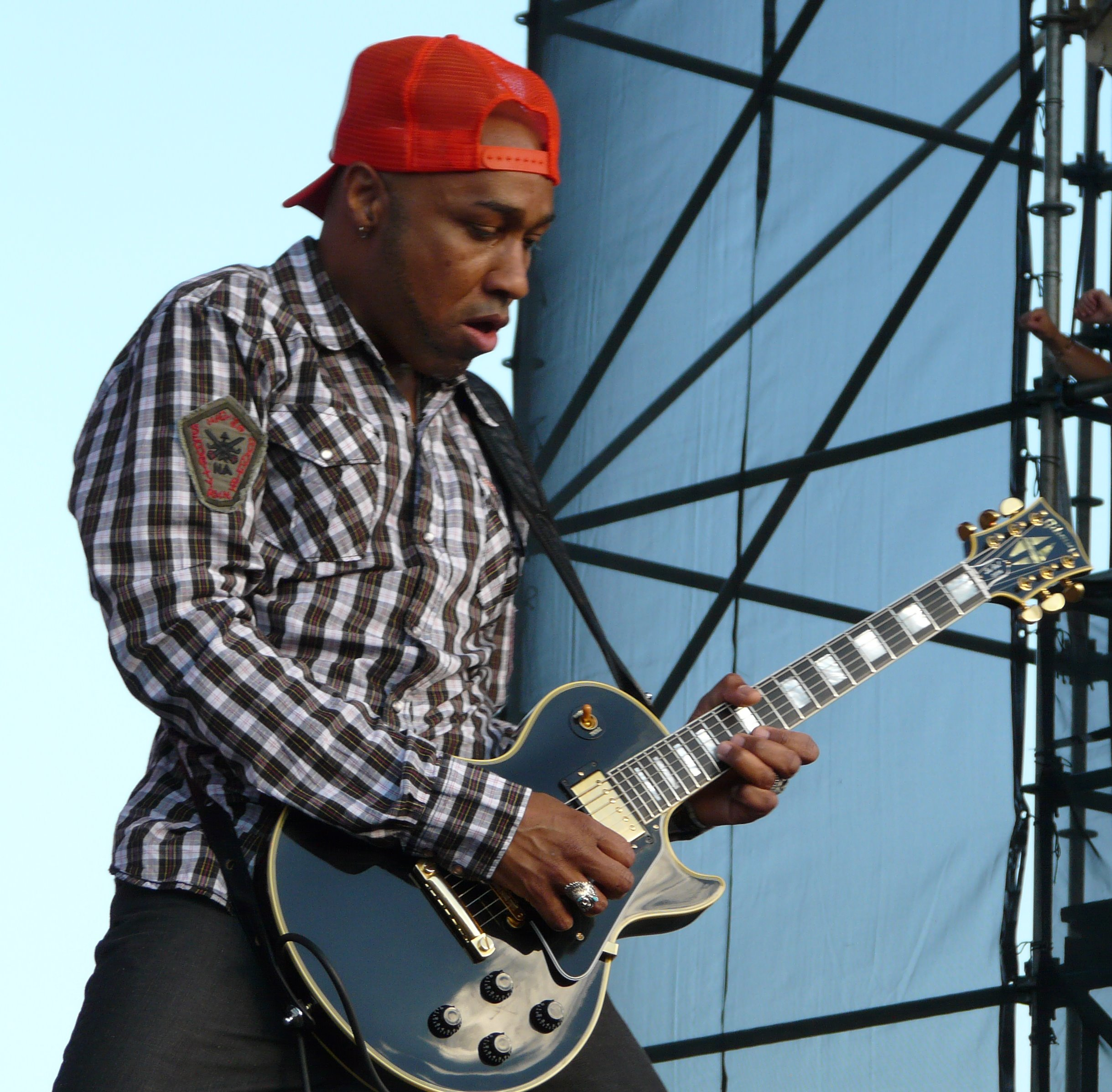
- Vic Johnson with Sammy Hagar on July 12, 2008, at the Moondance Jam

Background information
- Born: Victor C. Johnson; July 7th Los Angeles, California, United States
- Genres: Rock, hard rock, heavy metal
- Occupation: Guitarist
- Years active: 1980–present

Vic Johnson is an American rock guitarist best known for playing guitar with The BusBoys and later with Sammy Hagar and the Waboritas.

He was influenced by Jimi Hendrix. He played in several bands throughout high school around the Colorado Springs, Colorado, area. Originally from Security, Colorado, he moved to Los Angeles, California, in the 1980s, where he joined The BusBoys, a predominantly African-American rock band. The band appeared in the film 48 Hrs., performed on Saturday Night Live, and recorded several albums with Arista Records.

Johnson also took on several side projects during this decade including Sound Barrier, an all-black heavy metal band. Sound Barrier evolved into Total Eclipse, played clubs such as the Whisky a Go Go in West Hollywood, and toured across the country. During the 1990s Johnson was a session musician, but in 1997 he joined Sammy Hagar's band on the Marching to Mars world tour. Johnson continues to tour with members of Hagar's Waboritas.

Hagar also called Johnson for his supergroup Sammy Hagar and the Circle, along with bassist Michael Anthony (whom Hagar met in Van Halen and who also played occasionally with The Waboritas), and drummer Jason Bonham.

== Discography ==
=== with The BusBoys ===
- Minimum Wage Rock & Roll (1980)
- American Worker (1982)
- Money Don't Make No Man (1988)
- (Boys Are) Back in Town (2000)

=== with Sound Barrier ===
- Total Control (1983)
- Speed of Light (1986)

=== with Sammy Hagar & The Waboritas ===
- Red Voodoo (1999)
- Ten 13 (2000)
- Not 4 Sale (2002)
- Live -- Hallelujah (2003)
- Livin' It Up! (2006)
- Lite Roast (2014)

=== with Sammy Hagar and The Circle ===
- At Your Service (2015)
- Space Between (2019)
- Lockdown 2020 (2021)
- Crazy Times (2022)
