= The Essential Red Collection =

Greatest hits album by Sammy Hagar
- Released: August 10, 2004
- Recorded: 1973–1999
- Genre: Heavy metal; hard rock; glam metal
- Length: 78:40
- Label: Hip-O

Sammy Hagar chronology
Live: Hallelujah (2003)	The Essential Red Collection (2004)	Livin' It Up! (2006)

Professional ratings
Review scores
Source	Rating
AllMusic	4/5 stars

The Essential Red Collection is a greatest hits album by Sammy Hagar. It includes some of his early works, from "Bad Motor Scooter" with Montrose, released demos, film soundtrack songs to more recent material. It was released in 2004 on Hip-O Records. It excludes songs from his time with Van Halen.

== Song information ==
- "Thinking of You" was retooled for Hagar's first album, Nine on a Ten Scale, and included with the title, "Rock 'n' Roll Romeo".
- A different version of "Heavy Metal" was included on the Heavy Metal soundtrack. The version included here, however, was the re-recorded version for his Standing Hampton album.
- "Winner Takes It All", "Give to Live", and "Eagles Fly" feature Edward Van Halen on bass guitar.

== Track listing ==
All tracks are written by Sammy Hagar, except where noted.

The Essential Red Collection track listing
No.	Title	Writer(s)	Album	Length
1.	"Bad Motor Scooter"		Montrose (1973)	3:41
2.	"Thinking of You"		(previously unreleased 1974 demo)	3:42
3.	"Call My Name"		(previously unreleased 1974 demo)	3:03
4.	"Red"	Hagar; John Carter	Sammy Hagar (1977)	4:04
5.	"I've Done Everything for You"		(originally released as a B-side to the 1979 "(Sittin' On) The Dock of the Bay" single)	3:03
6.	"Heavy Metal"	Hagar; Jim Peterik	Standing Hampton (1982)	3:49
7.	"I'll Fall in Love Again"		Standing Hampton	4:10
8.	"There's Only One Way to Rock"		Standing Hampton	4:14
9.	"Fast Times at Ridgemont High"		Fast Times at Ridgemont High (1982)	3:34
10.	"Your Love is Driving Me Crazy"		Three Lock Box (1982)	3:30
11.	"Two Sides of Love"		VOA (1984)	3:41
12.	"I Can't Drive 55"		VOA	4:12
13.	"The Girl Gets Around"	Hagar; Dean Pitchford	Footloose (1984)	3:21
14.	"Winner Takes It All"	Giorgio Moroder; Thomas Whitlock	Over the Top (1987)	3:58
15.	"Give to Live"		I Never Said Goodbye (1987)	4:22
16.	"Eagles Fly"		I Never Said Goodbye	4:59
17.	"High Hopes"		Unboxed (1994)	5:28
18.	"Little White Lie"		Marching to Mars (1997)	2:52
19.	"Marching to Mars"		Marching to Mars	5:05
20.	"Mas Tequila"	Hagar; Gary Glitter; Mike Leander	Red Voodoo (1999)	4:10

== Singles ==
- "Call My Name" b/w "Eagles Fly (Unreleased Radio Edit)" b/w "Eagles Fly (Album version)" (Hip-O)

== Versions ==
- Hip-O Records (US) : B0002760-02
