= Unboxed (Sammy Hagar album) =

Compilation album by Sammy Hagar
- Released: March 15, 1994
- Recorded: 1981–1993
- Genre: Rock
- Length: 49:34
- Label: Geffen Records
- Producer: Mike Clink

Sammy Hagar chronology
Turn Up The Music! (1993)	Unboxed (1994)	The Anthology (1994)

Professional ratings
Review scores
Source	Rating
Allmusic	4.5/5 stars
Rolling Stone	2/5 stars

Unboxed is a compilation album of Sammy Hagar's recording career at Geffen Records. It features two previously unreleased songs, "High Hopes" and "Buying My Way Into Heaven". It was released on March 15, 1994.

== Development ==
In 1993, Geffen's A&R representative John Kalodner called Hagar to say the label wanted to release a compilation called "Unboxed". Hagar approved the title, as it poked fun at all the artists and bands that were releasing boxed set collections at the time. He agreed to record two new songs for financial reasons: Sammy was going through a divorce with his first wife Betsy Berardi, and the album would help settle it. Berardi wanted the division of royalties from songs he wrote while the two were married. Hagar convinced her to accept a fixed amount instead, which would be Geffen's payment for Unboxed. In an interview with Howard Stern in 2011, Sammy said he paid his wife nearly $9 million, and $23,000 per month for many years to follow. Sammy never kept a penny on that release, as all the money it made was given to his ex-wife, as part of the divorce settlement.

In order for the album to be released by Geffen, Sammy wanted at least $500,000 for two new songs. Eventually he negotiated a publishing deal for Unboxed which gave him around $750,000. There would be no single released, or new video. The only promotion Hagar would take part would be a two-week press junket, half in New York and half in Los Angeles, which included the Late Show with David Letterman and appeared on CNN's Showbiz Today. The two new songs had been presented to the Van Halen camp many years prior, but rejected. Sammy recorded the songs with producer Mike Clink.

According to Sammy's autobiography, the Van Halen brothers did not want Sammy to put out an album. During this time, Van Halen was in the process of hiring a new manager after Ed Leffler died in October 1993, and behind the scenes, the band was beginning to fall apart. Sammy created a new publishing company called, "Nine Music" and insisted that his portions of the Van Halen publishing no longer be combined with Van Halen's publishing company, "Yessup." He had a clause in his contract with Van Halen that said he could record a solo album after each Van Halen studio album. Sammy would receive upwards of $1.5 for each album. When Van Halen's new manager came into the picture, Ray Danniels had this clause removed, which caused tension between Sammy and the Van Halen camp. Another bad moment occurred during the promotion, as Hagar wanted to bring Van Halen bassist Michael Anthony with him to The Tonight Show, but the Van Halens complained and eventually Sammy gave up on his appearance.

In 1997, Hagar declared that he considered Unboxed the beginning of the end of his tenure in Van Halen, and added that "If I would have ever dreamed that I wouldn't be in Van Halen anymore and was going to have resume my solo career again, I would have never contributed anything towards my own greatest hits package, even for the money." Eddie Van Halen complained that Hagar was against his project of a Van Halen compilation when he had a few greatest hits albums during his tenure as the singer - though the others, Capitol Records's Red Hot! (1989) and The Best of Sammy Hagar (1992), unlike Unboxed, were released without Hagar's consent, as his contract with Capitol gave him no control over it.

== Song information ==
- "High Hopes" is about the inspirational effects that comes with smoking marijuana, only to have those inspirational dreams forgotten when the effects wear off. When asked if it was a pro-drug song or anti-drug song, Sammy simply stated, "Hey, it's the facts, Jack. It's not pro or negative, I'm just talking about what happens." Prior to the album's release, Hagar had performed the song live with his band Los Tres Gusanos.
- "Buying My Way into Heaven" is about televangelists. "I have relatives. I have people within my family. I know people that within their family that are not really well off. And they skimp and scrape to send these people $10 bucks, $20 bucks, whatever they can afford. And the idea of it is so that they can be guaranteed, that because they've had a miserable life on the planet Earth, and been such beaten down and had such heartbreaks and bad luck. That these guys go out and they tell these people, 'Send me your money, and I'll make sure you're okay in Heaven.' And I think that's about the lowest thing that anyone can do to anyone. I think that these people should send their money, 'cause these guys are multi-multi-hundreds of millions of dollars that they have, and they should send these people that need the money the money and not ask them to send it to them. If they want to do something for God, they should send money to these people, and they should open up their big giant mansions and their churches to the homeless and feed them daily."
- One notable omission from this collection is Hagar's highest-charting single, "Your Love Is Driving Me Crazy".

== Track listing ==
1. "High Hopes" (Hagar) - 5:19
2. "Buying My Way into Heaven" (Hagar) - 4:39
3. "I'll Fall in Love Again" (Hagar) - 4:10
4. "There's Only One Way to Rock" (Hagar) - 4:15
5. "Heavy Metal" (Hagar/Jim Peterik) - 3:50
6. "Eagles Fly" (Hagar) - 4:59
7. "Baby's on Fire" (Hagar) - 3:34
8. "Three Lock Box" (Hagar) - 3:21
9. "Two Sides of Love" (Hagar) - 3:41
10. "I Can't Drive 55" (Hagar) - 4:13
11. "Give to Live" (Hagar) - 4:23
12. "I Don't Need Love" (Bill Church/Hagar/David Lauser/Gary Pihl) - 3:10

== Personnel ==
- Sammy Hagar: lead vocals on all songs, guitar
- Gary Pihl: guitar on 3-5, 7-10, 12
- Jesse Harms: keyboards 6, 9-11
- John Pierce: bass on 1-2
- Bill Church: bass on 3-5, 7-10, 12
- Eddie Van Halen: bass on 6 and 11, guitar solo on 6
- David Lauser: drums

== Charts ==
Chart (1994)	Peak position
US Billboard 200	51

== Certifications ==
Region	Certification	Certified units/sales
United States (RIAA)	Gold	500,000^{^}
^{^} Shipments figures based on certification alone.
