= Dust (band) =

American hard rock band

- Origin: New York City, U.S.
- Genres: Hard rock
- Years active: 1969–1972
- Label: Kama Sutra Records
- Past members: Kenny Aaronson; Marc Bell; Richie Wise

Dust was an American hard rock band active in the early 1970s.

== History ==
Dust was formed in 1969 by Richie Wise and two teenagers, Kenny Aaronson and Marc Bell. The trio's producer and manager, Kenny Kerner, also wrote the group's lyrics. Their eponymous debut album was released on Kama Sutra Records in 1971, followed by a sophomore release, Hard Attack, issued on the same label the following year. Although Wise began writing material for a third album, the band dissolved due to lack of promotion and Wise's interest in producing.

While the group only released these two albums, they later became of historical interest to collectors of early American heavy metal. Both albums were reissued on April 16, 2013, as a combined CD set titled Hard Attack / Dust (Legacy Recordings), as well as on vinyl on April 20 for Record Store Day.

== Later projects ==
Wise and Kerner went into production with Kiss, among others, producing that band's first two albums.

Bell's next project after Dust was Estus; he played on their 1973 eponymous album. In the mid-1970s, he joined Richard Hell & the Voidoids, playing on their first album, Blank Generation). In 1978, he replaced Thomas Erdelyi in the Ramones, assuming the name Marky Ramone. Marky was inducted with The Ramones into the Rock and Roll Hall of Fame in 2001 and received a Grammy Lifetime Achievement Award in 2011. He also later performed with Marky Ramone and the Intruders, The Ramainz, Marky Ramone & the Speedkings, Teenage Head, the Misfits, and Marky Ramone's Blitzkrieg, as well as on solo recordings by former bandmates Dee Dee Ramone and Joey Ramone. Bell is currently an on-air personality on Sirius/XM Satellite Radio, hosting "Punk Rock Blitzkrieg". Bell has also appeared on numerous TV shows including The Simpsons and Anthony Bourdain: No Reservations.

Aaronson joined Stories, who earned a number one hit with "Brother Louie". He later toured and/or recorded with Edgar Winter, Joan Jett and the Blackhearts, Bob Dylan, Billy Idol, Billy Squier, Foghat, HSAS (Sammy Hagar, Neil Schon, Kenny Aaronson, Michael Shrieve), Brian Setzer, Mick Taylor, Dave Edmunds, Graham Parker, Hall and Oates, Leslie West Band, Rick Derringer, Blue Öyster Cult, Michael Monroe, Dana Fuchs, John Eddie, Mountain, Robert Gordon, Joe Cocker, Corky Laing, the Satisfactors, the Yardbirds and Richard Barone, among others. Since 2015, he has been a member of The Yardbirds.

== Former members ==
- Richie Wise – guitar, vocals
- Kenny Aaronson – bass
- Marc Bell – drums
- Billy Seidman – bass

== Discography ==
=== Studio albums ===
- Dust (1971, Kama Sutra Records)
- Hard Attack (1972, Kama Sutra Records)

=== Compilation albums ===
Hard Attack/Dust (2013, Legacy Recordings)
