= Jaywalk (disambiguation) =

Jaywalking is a term commonly used in North America to refer to illegal or reckless pedestrian crossing of a roadway.

Jaywalking, Jaywalk, or Jaywalker may also refer to:

- Jaywalking (The Tonight Show): recurring segment on The Tonight Show with Jay Leno
- JWalk, unit testing toolkit for the Java programming language
- Jaywalk (horse) (born 2016), Thoroughbred racehorse
- The Jaywalker (animated short), see: Academy Award for Best Animated Short Film

== Bands and Musicians ==
- The Jaywalks, Australian band
- J-Walk, Korean musical duo
- Dee Jaywalker, Belgian punk rock musician and songwriter

== Albums ==
- Jaywalkin', 1975 album by jazz bassist Niels-Henning Ørsted Pedersen
- Jaywalker (album), 2005 album by Josh Joplin
- The Jaywalker, 2004 album by Duke Ellington

== See also ==
- Jay Walker (disambiguation)
