= Who's Your Daddy? =

Who's Your Daddy? is an alternate capitalization of "Who's your daddy?", a phrase expressing dominance, especially of a sexual nature.

Who's Your Daddy? may also refer to:

== Music ==
- "Who's Your Daddy?" (Lordi song), 2006
- "Who's Your Daddy?" (Toby Keith song), 2002
- "Who's Your Daddy?", a song by Benny Benassi from Best of Benny Benassi
- "Who's Your Daddy?", a song by Daddy Yankee from El Cartel: The Big Boss
- "Who's Your Daddy", a song by Ringo Starr from Y Not

== Television ==
- Who's Your Daddy? (2005 TV series), an American reality television series
- Who's Your Daddy? (2020 TV series), an Indian streaming television series
- "Who's Your Daddy?" (House), a 2006 episode of House
- Who's Your Daddy (Friday Night Lights), an episode of the TV series Friday Night Lights
- "Who's Your Daddy?/Homewrecker", an episode of The Fairly OddParents
- Who's Your Daddy Now?, a Filipino sitcom
- Who's Your Daddy, a 2012 episode of Royal Pains

== Other uses ==
- Who's Your Daddy? (film), a 2003 film written and directed by Andy Fickman
- Who's Your Daddy? (video game), a 2015 video game created by Joe Dave Williams
- Who's Your Daddy?, also known as Father Figures, a 2017 American comedy film

== See also ==
- Who's Ya Daddy?, a song by Gerling
- The Jaywalks, formerly known as Who's Ya Daddy
- "Who's the Daddy?", 2005 episode of Two Pints of Lager and a Packet of Crisps
- Hoosier Daddy (disambiguation)
- Who's Your Mommy? (disambiguation)
