= Ramones – Around the World =

Ramones – Around the World is a 1998 video of the American punk band the Ramones. It consists of home video footage from Marky Ramone of the band's extensive touring and backstage footage along with live performances, and is considered by critics to give a much more accurate picture of the band than later, slicker productions, such as Ramones: Raw. It showcases the huge affection their core fans felt for the band but also the regard the third wave of punk influenced bands had for them, The title should not be confused with Rock Around The World, a 1970s syndicated live-concert radio series which featured the Ramones in one episode.
