= Anthology (Sammy Hagar album) =

The Anthology

Compilation album by Sammy Hagar
- Released: 1994
- Recorded: 1973–84
- Genre: Rock
- Length: 61:01
- Label: The Connoisseur Collection

Sammy Hagar chronology
Unboxed (1994)	The Anthology (1994)	The Best of Sammy Hagar (1999)

The Anthology is a unique Sammy Hagar compilation album, in that it combines tracks from both of his Capitol Records and Geffen Records eras. Additionally, four tracks from his two Montrose albums on Warner Bros. Records are included.

Professional ratings
Review scores
Source	Rating
Allmusic	link

== Track listing ==
1. "Bad Motor Scooter" (Sammy Hagar) - 3:46
2. "Rock The Nation" (Ronnie Montrose) - 3:04
3. "Connection" (Mick Jagger/Keith Richards) - 5:44
4. "Paper Money" (Hagar/Montrose) - 4:58
5. "Flamingos Fly" (Van Morrison) - 4:23
6. "Keep On Rockin'" (John Carter/Hagar) - 2:51
7. "Cruisin' & Boozin'" (Hagar) - 3:07
8. "Fillmore Shuffle" (Bruce Stephens) - 3:42
9. "Red" (Carter/Hagar) - 4:06
10. "You Make Me Crazy" (Hagar) - 2:45
11. "I've Done Everything for You" (Hagar) - 3:04
12. "This Planet's on Fire (Burn in Hell)" (Hagar) - 4:37
13. "Heartbeat" (Betsy Hagar/Hagar) - 3:54
14. "Piece of My Heart" (Bert Berns/Jerry Ragovoy) - 3:55
15. "Your Love Is Driving Me Crazy" (Hagar) - 3:23
16. "Two Sides Of Love" (Hagar) - 3:40
17. "I Can't Drive 55" (Hagar) - 4:12
