= Who's Your Mommy? =

Who's Your Mommy? may refer to:

- Who's Your Mommy? (TV series), a 2005 American reality television series
- "Who's Your Mommy?", an episode of The Adventures of Jimmy Neutron, Boy Genius
- "Who's Your Mommy?", an episode of The Thundermans
- "Who's Your Mommy?", a song from the 2024 Hindi-language film Madgaon Express

== See also ==
- Who's Your Momma, 2007 album by Anouk
- Who's Your Mummy?, a book in the Goosebumps HorrorLand series
- Who's Your Daddy? (disambiguation)
