= Marky Ramone & the Speedkings =

Marky Ramone & the Speedkings was founded in 2001. The band recorded a studio album which first came out in Europe/Argentina and Japan as No If's, And's or But's. Each of these releases featured different tracks as a bonus. It was then released in the United States as Legends Bleed in September 2002 and featured live tracks. The band did several European tours as well as a Japan and US tour, the latter of which ended in 2003. They released several singles, including "I've Got Dee Dee On My Mind" in memory of Dee Dee Ramone. A live album, Alive, was recorded and released on Rawk'A Hula Records.

== Band members ==
- Nick "CQ" Cooper (lead vocals, guitar)
- Dee Jaywalker (guitar, backing vocals)
- Glen Meyer (bass)
- Marky Ramone (drums)
