= Hagar Schon Aaronson Shrieve =

Hard rock supergroup (1983–1984)

- Also known as: HSAS
- Origin: California, U.S.
- Genres: Hard rock; glam metal
- Years active: 1983–1984
- Label: Geffen
- Past members: Sammy Hagar; Neal Schon; Kenny Aaronson; Michael Shrieve

Hagar Schon Aaronson Shrieve (also known as HSAS) was a rock supergroup band featuring lead vocalist Sammy Hagar, lead guitarist Neal Schon, bassist Kenny Aaronson and drummer Michael Shrieve. The group reportedly rehearsed for less than a month before playing in concert. They released a semi-live album, recorded during two live performances at The Warfield in San Francisco, entitled Through the Fire. The album includes a cover of Procol Harum's "A Whiter Shade of Pale".

== History ==
=== Formation ===
After the release of Journey's Frontiers in early 1983, guitarist Neal Schon decided to pursue another project with vocalist/guitarist Sammy Hagar. Hagar had released his Three Lock Box album in late 1982 and afterwards took a three-month safari vacation in Africa. Schon and Hagar then began looking for other musicians to complete the band. In an interview from mid-1983, Schon talked about the band's formation: "Sammy and I just get along so well. We're already working on an album together, and it's a killer! Right now we have Denny Carmassi, who used to work with Sammy on drums, and we're looking for a bassist. We worked a bit with Tom Petersson, but I guess he had other commitments."

Schon went on the Frontiers tour with Journey from February to September 1983, and then reconvened with Hagar. By this time, Carmassi had left the band to join Heart, and the remaining two band members became Kenny Aaronson on bass and Michael Shrieve on drums. Shrieve and Schon had played together in Santana in the early 1970s.

=== Through the Fire ===
To record their album, the band played live dates in the San Francisco Bay Area from November 9, 1983, to November 21, 1983. Two of the dates, November 14 and November 15 at the Civic Center in San Jose, California were recorded and broadcast by MTV. This footage was aired at least once but was never released on official videotapes or DVDs. The album Through the Fire was edited in-studio to reduce the crowd noise, but otherwise was left as recorded.

A full concert of the band was also aired on the radio as a Westwood One broadcast. The original tracks that did not make the album include: "Movin' In for the Kill", "Tough Enough", "Through the Eyes of Love", "Hope and Fear", "What Will Never Be", and "Since You Came" (later revisited by Hagar as "The Love" on Red Voodoo (1999).

The first single released was their cover version of "A Whiter Shade of Pale" in May 1984, which reached No. 94 on the Billboard Hot 100 charts. Another single released, "Top of the Rock" (as a promo only,) peaked at No. 15 on the "Billboard" Top Rock Tracks, and it became popular in various airplay regions of the United States. In addition, a third single from H.S.A.S., "Missing You" (also promo only,) peaked at No. 37 on the Top Rock Tracks.

The band toured briefly in California in 1984, adding rhythm guitarist Nick Sciorsci for live performances.

=== Later projects ===
HSAS only produced one album before Schon returned to Journey, and Hagar recorded his VOA album and subsequently joined Van Halen. Hagar and Schon reunited almost 20 years later to form the short-lived Planet Us project, which would also feature past Van Halen and future Chickenfoot and Sammy Hagar and the Circle bassist Michael Anthony.

== Discography ==
=== Studio albums ===
- Through the Fire (1984)

=== Singles ===
- "Whiter Shade of Pale" (1984)
