= Hoosier Daddy =

Hoosier Daddy is a pun on the phrase "Who's your daddy?" and the demonym "Hoosier" (the latter referring to a resident of Indiana, United States).

Hoosier Daddy may also refer to:

- "Hoosier Daddy" (According to Jim), season 6 episode 4 (2007)
- "Hoosier Daddy" (In Plain Sight), season 1 episode 2 (2008)
- Hoosier Daddy, the sponsor of the Rookie Sportsman Modified division at the Devil's Bowl Speedway
- Hoosier Daddy, nominee for Best Lesbian Romance at the 26th Lambda Literary Awards
- Hoosier Daddy, a typeface designed by Jim Parkinson

== See also ==
- Who's Your Daddy? (disambiguation)
