= Jay Walker =

Jay Walker may refer to:

- Jay Walker (politician) (born 1972), American politician, football analyst and former player
- Jay S. Walker (born 1956), American entrepreneur
- Jay Walker (Ninjago), a character in Ninjago

== See also ==
- Jaywalker (disambiguation)
- Jason Walker (disambiguation)
