= Jason Walker =

Jason Walker may refer to:

- Jason Walker (footballer) (born 1984), English footballer
- Jason Walker (musician) (1969–2026), New-Zealand–Australian musician
- Jason Walker (American musician), American musician

== See also ==
- Jay Walker (disambiguation)
