= Dust (Dust album) =

Studio album by Dust
- Released: September 1971
- Recorded: Bell Sound (New York City)
- Genres: Hard rock, heavy metal
- Length: 36:35
- Label: Kama Sutra
- Producers: Kenny Aaronson, Kenny Kerner

Dust chronology
Dust (1971)	Hard Attack (1972)

Professional ratings
Review scores
Source	Rating
AllMusic	4/5 stars
Answers.com	3.5/5 stars

Dust is the debut album by American hard rock band Dust, released by Kama Sutra Records in September 1971.

== Track listing ==
All tracks are written by Richie Wise and Kenny Kerner, except where noted.

No.	Title	Writer(s)	Length
1.	"Stone Woman"		4:03
2.	"Chasin' Ladies"		3:39
3.	"Goin' Easy"		4:30
4.	"Love Me Hard"		5:30
5.	"From a Dry Camel"		9:52
6.	"Often Shadows Felt"		5:12
7.	"Loose Goose"	Kenny Aaronson	3:49

== Personnel ==
Dust

- Richie Wise – electric and acoustic guitars, vocals
- Marc Bell – drums
- Kenny Aaronson – bass, steel, dobro and bottleneck guitars
- Kenny Kerner – lyrics, production, management
