= Tom Guerra =

American musician

- Born: 1963 (age 62–63)
- Genres: Roots rock, blues, garage rock
- Occupations: Musician, songwriter, author, session musician, preservationist
- Instrument: Guitar
- Years active: late 1970s–present
- Website: tomguerra.com

Tom Guerra (born 1963) is an American guitarist, songwriter, and vintage guitar preservationist. He has been a member of Mambo Sons and Dirty Bones Band, has appeared as a guest on recordings by other notable artists, and has released albums under his own name.

== Career ==
Guerra began his music career in the late 1970s, playing in the New England club circuit with blues and rock acts. His primary influences include Rory Gallagher, Paul Kossoff, Jimmy Page, Keith Richards, Ronnie Wood, Muddy Waters, Buddy Guy, and Joe Walsh. In the 1980s, Guerra recorded with Rick Derringer, Max Weinberg, Guitar Shorty, Kenny Aaronson, and many others. From 1983 to 1992 Guerra was a member of the garage rock group Dirty Bones Band and recorded four albums with them. He was profiled in Guitar Player magazine in 1991. He started writing for Vintage Guitar Magazine in 1998 and continues to do so to the present day. His column focuses on authentic recording techniques and collecting vintage guitars. Guerra has also received many endorsements from guitar companies including Brian Moore Custom guitars, plus effects and amplifier companies like DST-Engineering. In 1999 Guerra formed the band Mambo Sons with longtime collaborator Scott Lawson. That band released four albums, receiving several "album of the year" accolades from publications like NYRock magazine and Modern Guitars magazine, while Lawson was invited to serve as artist-in-residence at the Wallace Stegner house.

In 2009 and 2013, at the request of Johnny Winter, Guerra wrote the liner notes for Winters' series of live albums entitled The Bootleg Series. When Mambo Sons went on hiatus in 2012, Guerra shifted to songwriting, studio session work, and production, as well as working on solo recordings. He also turned to topical songwriting: his 2012 song "Love Comes to Us All" addressed the Sandy Hook Elementary School shooting and was praised by several Connecticut politicians. In 2013, he recorded "Put Up Their Names - The Ballad of the U.S.S. Frank E. Evans" to honor the 74 sailors lost aboard the USS Frank E. Evans naval disaster off the coast of Vietnam in June 1969. According to Guerra, the purpose of the song is to bring attention to the U.S. Government's refusal to list the names of those 74 servicemen on the Vietnam Veterans Memorial. His first solo album All of the Above was released in 2014, followed by Trampling Out the Vintage in 2016, and American Garden in 2018. The latter album included several songs that Guerra had been invited to write for a Yardbirds reunion album that was ultimately shelved.

In 2020, in the midst of the worldwide Covid-19 pandemic, Guerra released his fourth solo album entitled Sudden Signs of Grace. Guerra said he felt compelled to release it now because "people need music, especially during times like these." In a review of Sudden Signs of Grace, The Big Takeover commended Guerra by stating it's "his best album to date...gorgeous." The video for the title track features guest appearances from a number of rock notables, including Hilton Valentine, Dan Baird, Christine Ohlman, G.E. Smith, Alvin Youngblood Hart, Jeff Pevar, Kenny Aaronson and Morgan Fisher.

In March 2022, Sentimental Junk, Guerra's fifth solo album was released on the Thin Man Music label, featuring the single "California's Got to My Girl", a duet with Jon Butcher, and also featuring Mike Kosacek on drums, Morgan Fisher and Matt Zeiner on keys, and Kenny Aaronson on bass. A Newsweek podcast called the release "Capturing Lightning in a Bottle".

In late 2023, Guerra released "Mutilated World", as a single, also featuring Kenny Aaronson and drummer Mike Kosacek. In January 2024, the single "Sister Topanga" was released with this same lineup followed by "New American Way" in March 2024. In June 2024, Guerra released a new single with his core lineup of Aaronson and Kosacek, called “Television Dreams” with Jon Butcher on lead guitar. August 2024 saw Guerra guest on the new single by The Forefront Ramblers and in September, Guerra's new single "Good Times Big Fun" featuring the core lineup of Aaronson (bass) Kosacek (drums) and Guerra (vocals and guitars) was released and added to the online streaming services.

Guerra continued with his singles releases in 2025, with "Chi Chi Chu" featuring legendary SNL vocalist Christine Ohlman as well as the rhythm section of Aaronson and Kosacek. Summer of 2025 had him guesting on new albums by Laurent Moitrot and former Mott the Hoople guitarist Ariel Bender.

Based on the Minneapolis riots, Guerra released a cover of Minnesotan Paul Westerberg's "Meet Me Down the Alley" in February 2026.

Guerra has been praised for his commitment to songwriting: in a review of his 2016 album, American Songwriter said, "Guerra has honed his songwriting homework... All in all, the record is that rarity in the rock world: eclectic but never unfocused".

== Solo and band discography ==
- Exhumed - Dirty Bones Band (1983)
- Last Remains - Dirty Bones Band (1986)
- new wOrld disOrder - Dirty Bones Band (1991)
- Stronger Than Dirt - Dirty Bones Band (1993)
- Mambo Sons - Mambo Sons (1999)
- Play Some Rock & Roll - Mambo Sons (2003)
- Mr. Positive - Jeff Keithline (2004)
- Racket of Three - Mambo Sons (2005)
- Heavy Days - Mambo Sons (2009)
- All of the Above - Tom Guerra (2014)
- Trampling Out the Vintage - Tom Guerra (2016)
- American Garden - Tom Guerra (2018)
- 360 Degrees - Jon Butcher (2019)
- Sudden Signs of Grace - Tom Guerra (2020)
- Sentimental Junk - Tom Guerra (2022)
- "Mutilated World" (single) - Tom Guerra (2023)
- "Sister Topanga" (single) - Tom Guerra (2024)
- "New American Way" (single) - Tom Guerra (2024)
- "Television Dreams" (single) - Tom Guerra (2024)
- "Not So Fast Saint Marie" (single) - The Forefront Ramblers (2024)
- "Good Times Big Fun" (single) - Tom Guerra (2024)
- "Chi Chi Chu" (single) - Tom Guerra and Christine Ohlman (2025)
- "Donne-moi du temps" (album) - Laurent Moitrot (2025)
- "Bottleneck Blues" (single) - Luther Grosvenor (2025)
- "Meet Me Down the Alley" (single) - Tom Guerra and Morgan Fisher (2026)
