= Bad Motor Scooter =

Single by Montrose

from the album Montrose
- Released: October 17, 1973
- Genre: Hard rock, boogie rock
- Length: 3:43
- Label: Warner Bros.
- Songwriter: Sammy Hagar
- Producer: Ted Templeman

Audio video
- "Bad Motor Scooter" on YouTube

"'Bad Motor Scooter" is a song by American hard rock band Montrose, released on the band's 1973 debut album. Along with "Rock Candy", it is arguably the band's best-known song.

== Background and recording ==
The song was written by lead singer and frontman Sammy Hagar. Its introduction, a distorted electric slide guitar sound which emulates that of a revving motorcycle, became the defining component of the song. When the song was conceived before this guitar sound, the band and producer Ted Templeman were not happy because they felt it was missing a hook to make it stand out. Ronnie Montrose stumbled upon it while messing with a slide and fuzz box one day in the studio. Playing his guitar in Open D tuning, Montrose improvized what became the motorcycle sound — although Templeman and engineer Donn Landee kept him going when they failed to get the recording tape rolling. When performed live by the original Montrose lineup, Sammy Hagar would play the "motorcycle" introduction on a lap steel slide guitar.

== Playing by Chickenfoot ==
Hagar provided the same intro when Chickenfoot, the supergroup composed of Hagar, Joe Satriani, Michael Anthony and Chad Smith, performed a version during their live performances. Joe Satriani did the "motorcycle" introduction at the Montrose tribute concert using the whammy bar on his guitar instead of the slide guitar. On Chickenfoot's Best + Live album, Hagar claimed that "Bad Motor Scooter" was "actually the first song I ever wrote in my life".

The song has also been included on the Sammy Hagar compilation The Essential Red Collection.
