= Zonked/Ain't It Fun =

Studio album by Dee Dee Ramone
- Released: 1997
- Genre: Punk rock
- Label: Other People's Music

Zonked/Ain't It Fun is an album by Dee Dee Ramone. Zonked is the record released in America on the Other People's Music label, and Ain't It Fun is the version released in the UK on Blackout Records.

Lux Interior, Joey Ramone, and Marky Ramone made contributions to the album.

Ain't It Fun contains a bonus track, "Please Kill Me".

== Track listing ==
1. I'm Zonked, Los Hombres
2. Fix Yourself Up
3. I Am Seeing UFO's (with Joey Ramone on vocals)
4. Get Off Of The Scene
5. Never Never Again
6. Bad Horoscope (with Lux Interior on vocals)
7. It's So Bizarre
8. Get Out Of My Room
9. Someone Who Don't Fit In
10. Victim Of Society
11. My Chico
12. Disguises
13. Why Is Everybody Always Against Germany
14. Please Kill Me (Bonus track only on Ain't It Fun)
