= Kenny Aaronson =

American bassist (born 1952)

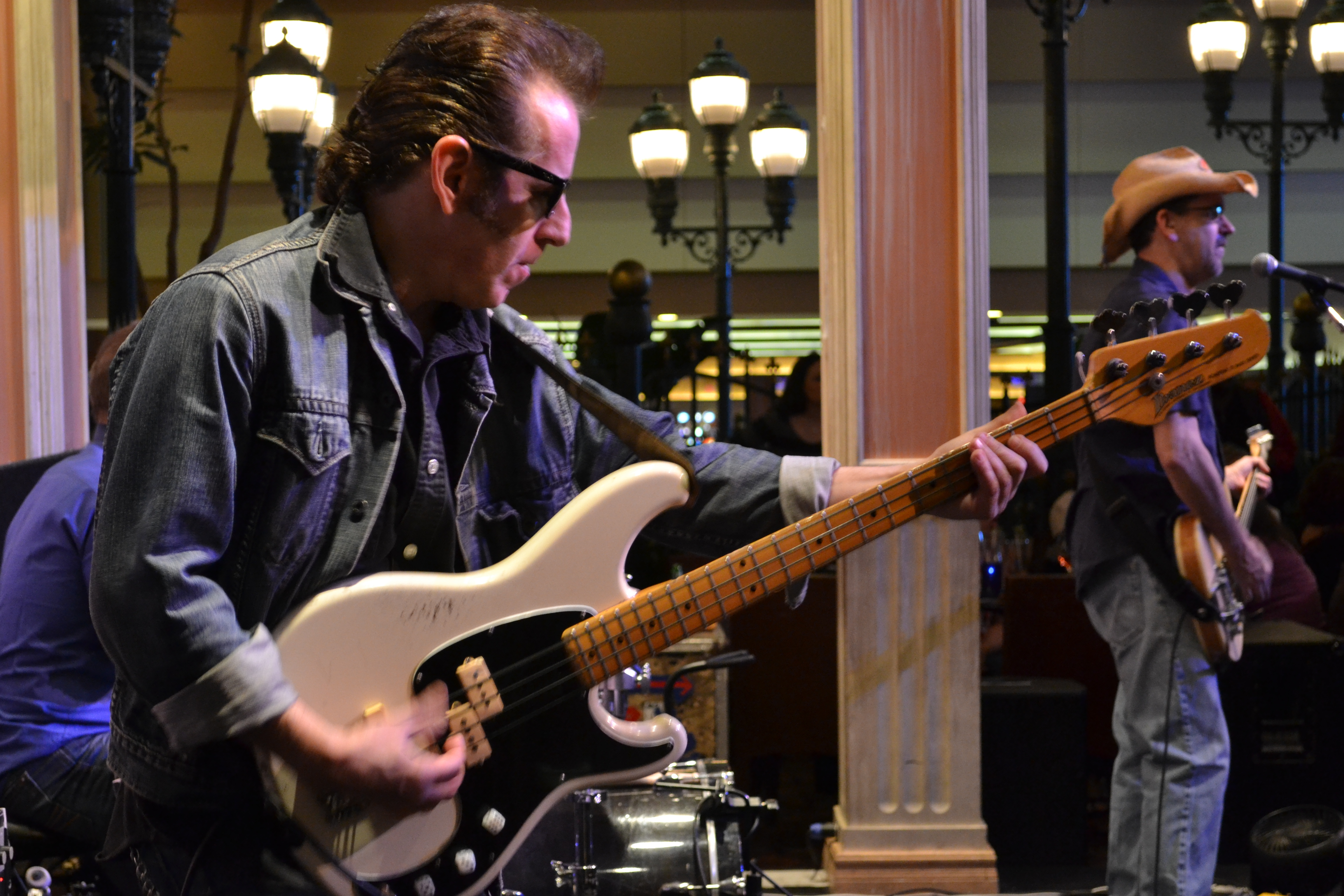
- Aaronson in 2011

Background information
- Born: Kenneth Aaronson; April 14, 1952 (age 74); Brooklyn, New York, U.S.
- Genres: Rock
- Occupation: Bassist
- Years active: 1971–present
- Member of: The Yardbirds
- Formerly of: Dust; Stories; Hagar Schon Aaronson Shrieve; New York Dolls

Kenny Aaronson (born April 14, 1952) is an American bass guitarist. He has recorded or performed with many notable artists such as Bob Dylan, Rick Derringer, Billy Idol, Joan Jett and the Blackhearts, Foghat, Sammy Hagar, Billy Squier, New York Dolls, and Hall and Oates. Since 2015, he has been the bassist for the Yardbirds.

== Early life and career ==
Following in his older brother's footsteps, he started playing drums at 11. Enamored by the bass on Motown records, and influenced by James Jamerson, Aaronson switched to an electric bass at 14.

As a teenager he played bass for Brooklyn-based hard rock band Dust, which included Marc Bell (a.k.a. Marky Ramone) and Richie Wise, which released two albums in 1971 and 1972 on the Kama Sutra Records label. In 1973, Aaronson joined the New York band Stories, whose single, "Brother Louie", reached #1 on the Billboard, Cashbox and Record World charts. From 1976 to 1979, Aaronson played bass for Rick Derringer.

== Peak success ==
In 1988, Aaronson was named Bassist of the year by Rolling Stone. That year Aaronson also toured with Bob Dylan, but he was forced to leave the tour after developing skin cancer. Aaronson underwent surgery, which was successful in defeating the disease.

Aaronson was the bassist in the house band for the MTV Guitar Greats Show with Dave Edmunds, Chuck Leavell and Michael Shrieve. He backed up Steve Cropper, Brian Setzer, Dickey Betts, Link Wray, Neal Schon, Johnny Winter, Lita Ford, Tony Iommi and Dave Gilmour. He auditioned for the Rolling Stones in 1994.

Aaronson toured and recorded with Billy Idol, Billy Squier, Foghat, Brian Setzer, Dave Edmunds, HSAS (with Sammy Hagar, Neal Schon, and Michael Shrieve), Mick Taylor, Graham Parker, Hall and Oates, Edgar Winter, Robert Gordon, Leslie West Band, Rick Derringer and Joan Jett.

Aaronson was a regular member of Jett's backing group the Blackhearts from 1991 to 1995. Aaronson was one of the few Blackheart band members to co-write a track with Jett. The song, "World of Denial", was recorded for the 1994 album Pure and Simple but was not released in the U.S. until 2001's Fit to Be Tied – Great Hits by Joan Jett and The Blackhearts.

== Recent work ==
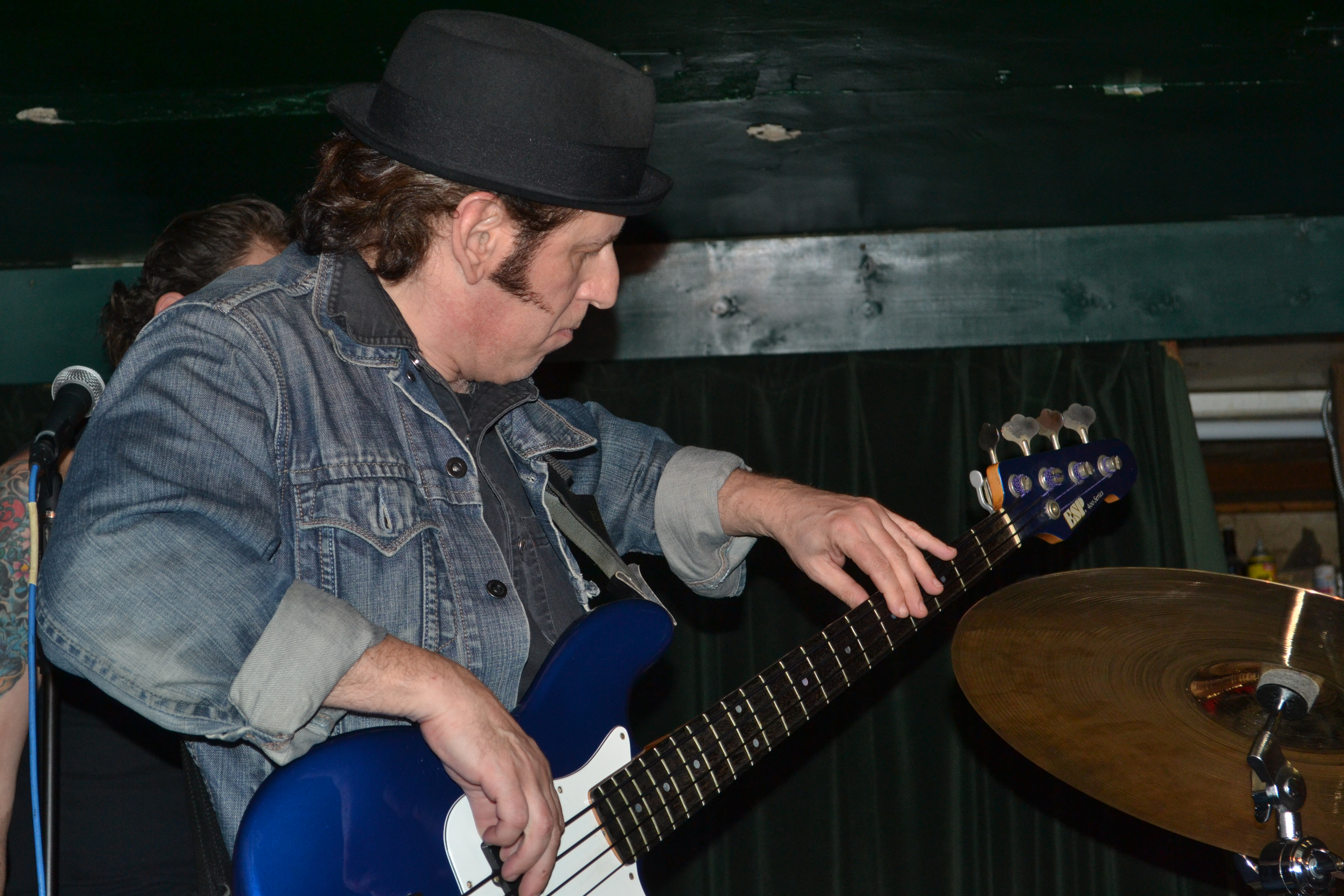
Aaronson in 2011

In July 2011, Aaronson supported singer/songwriter John Eddie and played with Corky Laing & The Memory Thieves. Also in 2011, Aaronson recorded with ex Bongo's singer Richard Barone on a tribute album for The Runaways. Aaronson joined the New York Dolls and toured in the summer of 2011 supporting Mötley Crüe and Poison.

In 2014, he recorded with Gar Francis of the Doughboys, Kurt Reil of The Grip Weeds and Bruce Ferguson of The Easy Out a self-titled full-length album under the name The Satisfactors. In June 2015, the first single of the album called Johnny Commando reached Top 10 in The Netherlands at Ned.FM Radio. In November 2015, he joined the British band The Yardbirds.

In 2016, he was featured on former Mambo Sons guitarist/songwriter Tom Guerra's second solo album Trampling Out the Vintage, and in 2018, co-wrote three songs with Guerra, originally intended for The Yardbirds, which were included on Guerra's third solo album, American Garden. In 2020, Aaronson once again figured prominently on Tom Guerra's fourth solo album Sudden Signs of Grace, and also appeared in the video for the title track. In 2022, he played a major role in Sentimental Junk, Guerra's fifth solo album.

== Discography ==
With Dust

- Dust (1971)
- Hard Attack (1972)

With Stories

- Brother Louie (1973)
- Traveling Underground (1973)

With Rick Derringer

- Derringer (1976)
- Sweet Evil (1977)
- Derringer Live (1977)
- If I Weren't So Romantic, I'd Shoot You (1978)
- Guitars and Women (1979)
- Rock and Roll Hoochie Koo: The Best of Rick Derringer (1996)

With Silver Condor

- Trouble at Home (1983)

With Hagar Schon Aaronson Shrieve

- Through the Fire (1984)

With Brian Setzer

- The Knife Feels Like Justice (1986)

With Blue Öyster Cult

- Club Ninja (1985)
- Imaginos (1988)

With Billy Idol

- Vital Idol (1987)

With Michael Monroe

- Not Fakin' It (1989)

With Joan Jett and the Blackhearts

- Pure and Simple (1994)
- Fit to be Tied writing credit on "World of Denial" (1997, 2006)

With Billy Squier

- Sixteen Strokes lap steel (1995)

With Graham Parker

- Live from New York (1996)

With Ian McDonald

- Drivers Eyes (1999)

With Tom Guerra and Scott Lawson (Mambo Sons)

- Mambo Sons (1999)

With John Eddie

- Guy Walks into a Bar (2001)
- Who the Hell is John Eddie (2003)

With Mountain

- Master of War (2007)

With Dana Fuchs

- Lonely for a Lifetime (2003)
- Love to Beg (2011)

With The Satisfactors

- The Satisfactors (2014)

With Radio Exile

- Radio Exile (2015)

With Tom Guerra

- Trampling Out the Vintage (2016)
- American Garden (2018)
- Sudden Signs of Grace (2020)
- Sentimental Junk (2022)

With Mark Duda

- Month of Sundays (2017)

Others

- Contributor to "Standing in the Shadows of Motown", The biography of James Jamerson (1989)
- Soundtrack "Porky's Revenge" (1990)
- Tribute to Otis Blackwell "Brace Yourself" with Joe Louis Walker, Debbie Harry, Ronnie Spector, Kris Kristofferson, Graham Parker, Smithereens(1994)
- Soundtrack "Boys on the Side" (1995)
