= Hoosier =

Official word describing a resident of the U.S. state of Indiana

Hoosier /ˈhuːʒər/ is the official demonym for the people of the U.S. state of Indiana. The origin of the term remains a matter of debate; however, "Hoosier" was in general use by the 1840s, having been popularized by Richmond resident John Finley's 1833 poem "The Hoosier's Nest". Indiana adopted the nickname "The Hoosier State" more than 150 years ago.

"Hoosier" is used in the names of numerous Indiana-based businesses and organizations. "Hoosiers" is also the name of the Indiana University athletic teams, whose mascot, a bison, is named Hoosier. As of 2017, the term is the official demonym used by the U.S. Government Publishing Office (GPO), making it the only GPO-recommended demonym of any US state that is not directly formed from the state's name. Before 2017, the GPO-recommended demonym for the state was "Indianian".

== Origin ==
In addition to "The Hoosier's Nest", the term also appeared in the Indianapolis Journal's "Carrier's Address" on January 1, 1833. There are many suggestions for the derivation of the word but none are universally accepted. In 1833, the Pittsburgh Statesman said the term had been in use for "some time past" and suggested it originated from census workers calling "Who's here?". Also in 1833, former Indiana Governor James B. Ray began publishing a newspaper titled The Hoosier.

=== Scholarship ===
In 1900, Meredith Nicholson wrote The Hoosiers, an early attempt to study the etymology of the word as applied to Indiana residents. Jacob Piatt Dunn, longtime secretary of the Indiana Historical Society, published The Word Hoosier, a similar attempt, in 1907. Both chronicled some of the popular and satirical etymologies circulating at the time and focused much of their attention on the use of the word in the Upland South to refer to woodsmen, yokels, and rough people. Dunn traced the word back to the Cumbrian hoozer, meaning anything unusually large, derived from the Old English hoo (as at Sutton Hoo), meaning "high" and "hill". The importance of immigrants from northern England and southern Scotland was reflected in numerous placenames including the Cumberland Mountains, the Cumberland River, and the Cumberland Gap. Nicholson defended the people of Indiana against such an association, while Dunn concluded that the early settlers had adopted the nickname self-mockingly and that it had lost its negative associations by the time of Finley's poem.

Johnathan Clark Smith subsequently showed that Nicholson and Dunn's earliest sources within Indiana were mistaken. A letter by James Curtis cited by Dunn and others as the earliest known use of the term was actually written in 1846, not 1826. Similarly, the use of the term in an 1859 newspaper item quoting an 1827 diary entry by Sandford Cox was more likely an editorial comment and not from the original diary. Smith's earliest sources led him to argue that the word originated as a term along the Ohio River for flatboatmen from Indiana and did not acquire its pejorative meanings until 1836, after Finley's poem.

William Piersen, a history professor at Fisk University, argued for a connection to the Methodist minister Rev. Harry Hosier (c. 1750–May 1806), who evangelized the American frontier at the beginning of the 19th century as part of the Second Great Awakening. "Black Harry" had been born a slave in North Carolina and sold north to Baltimore, Maryland, before gaining his freedom and beginning his ministry around the end of the American Revolution. He was a close associate and personal friend of Bishop Francis Asbury, the "Father of the American Methodist Church". Benjamin Rush said of him that "making allowances for his illiteracy, he was the greatest orator in America". His sermons called on Methodists to reject slavery and to champion the common working man. Piersen proposed that Methodist communities inspired by his example took or were given a variant spelling of his name (possibly influenced by the "yokel" slang) during the decades after his ministry.

According to Washington County newspaper reports of the time, Abraham Stover was Colonel of the Indiana Militia. He was a colorful figure in early Washington County history. Along with his son-in-law, John B. Brough, he was considered one of the two strongest men in Washington County. He was always being challenged to prove his might, and seems to have won several fights over men half his age. After whipping six or eight men in a fist fight in Louisville, Kentucky, he cracked his fists and said, "Ain't I a husher", which was changed in the news to "Hoosier", and thus originated the name of Hoosier in connection with Indiana men.

Jorge Santander Serrano, a PhD student from Indiana University, has also suggested that Hoosier might come from the French words for 'redness', rougeur, or 'red-faced', rougeaud. According to this hypothesis, the early pejorative use of the word Hoosier may have a link to the color red ("rouge" in French) which is associated with indigenous peoples, pejoratively called "red men" or "red-skins", and also with poor white people by calling them "red-necks".

=== Folk etymologies ===
==== "Who'sh 'ere?" ====
Humorous folk etymologies for the term "hoosier" have a long history, as recounted by Dunn in The Word Hoosier.

One account traces the word to the necessary caution of approaching houses on the frontier. In order to avoid being shot, a traveler would call out from afar to let themselves be known. The inhabitants of the cabin would then reply "Who's here?" which – in the Appalachian English of the early settlers – slurred into "Who'sh 'ere?" and thence into "Hoosier?" A variant of this account had the Indiana pioneers calling out "Who'sh 'ere?" as a general greeting and warning when hearing someone in the bushes and tall grass, to avoid shooting a relative or friend in error.

The poet James Whitcomb Riley facetiously suggested that the fierce brawling that took place in Indiana involved enough biting that the expression "Whose ear?" became notable. This arose from or inspired the story of two 19th-century French immigrants brawling in a tavern in the foothills of southern Indiana. One was cut and a third Frenchman walked in to see an ear on the dirt floor of the tavern, prompting him to slur out "Whosh ear?"

==== Mr. Hoosier's men ====
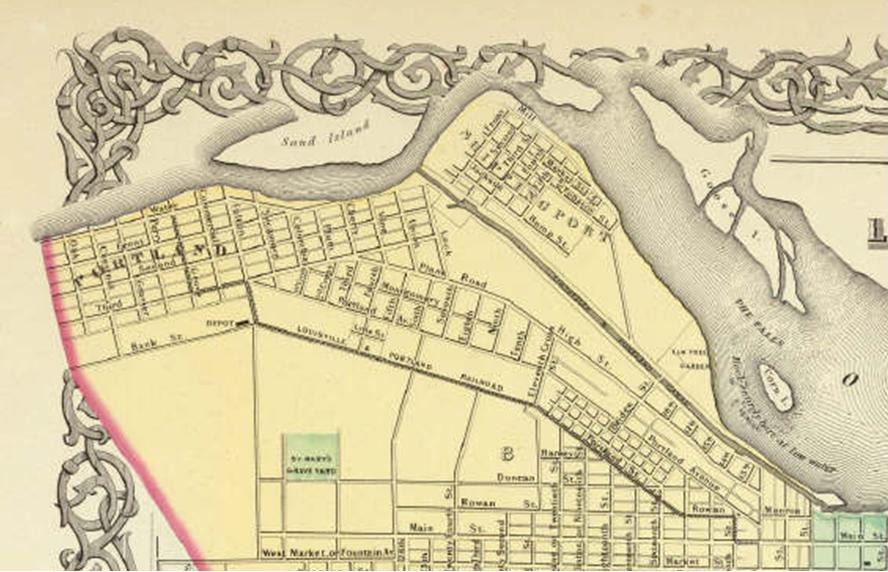
One possible origin of the term "Hoosier" came from the construction of the Louisville and Portland Canal (1826–1833).

Two related stories trace the origin of the term to gangs of workers from Indiana under the direction of a Mr. Hoosier.

The account related by Dunn is that a Louisville contractor named Samuel Hoosier preferred to hire workers from communities on the Indiana side of the Ohio River like New Albany rather than Kentuckians. During the excavation of the first canal around the Falls of the Ohio from 1826 to 1833, his employees became known as "Hoosier's men" and then simply "Hoosiers". The usage spread from these hard-working laborers to all of the Indiana boatmen in the area and then spread north with the settlement of the state. The story was told to Dunn in 1901 by a man who had heard it from a Hoosier relative while traveling in southern Tennessee. Dunn could not find any family of the given name in any directory in the region or anyone else in southern Tennessee who had heard the story and accounted himself dubious. This version was subsequently retold by Gov. Evan Bayh and Sen. Vance Hartke, who introduced the story into the Congressional Record in 1975, and matches the timing and location of Smith's subsequent research. However, the U.S. Army Corps of Engineers has been unable to find any record of a Hoosier or Hosier in surviving canal company records.

== Other uses ==
The word "hoosier" has been used in Greater St. Louis as a pejorative for an unintelligent or uncultured person. (Note: Thomas E. Murray carefully analyzed the use of "hoosier" in St. Louis, Missouri, where it is the favorite epithet of abuse. "When asked what a Hoosier is," Murray writes, "St. Louisans readily list a number of defining characteristics, among which are 'lazy,' 'slow-moving,' 'derelict,' and 'irresponsible.'" He continues, "Few epithets in St. Louis carry the pejorative connotations or the potential for eliciting negative responses that hoosier does." He conducted tests and interviews across lines of age and race and tabulated the results. He found the term ecumenically applied. He also noted the word was often used with a modifier, almost redundantly, as in "some damn Hoosier". In a separate section Murray speaks of the history of the word and cites Baker and Carmony (1975) and speculates on why Hoosier (in Indiana a "neutral or, more often, positive" term) should remain "alive and well in St. Louis, occupying as it does the honored position of being the city's number one term of derogation." A radio broadcast took up where Murray left off. During the program Fresh Air, Geoffrey Nunberg, a language commentator, answered questions about regional nicknames. He cited Elaine Viets, a Post-Dispatch columnist (also quoted by Paul Dickson), as saying that in St. Louis a "Hoosier is a low-life redneck, somebody you can recognize because they have a car on concrete blocks in their front yard and are likely to have just shot their wife who may also be their sister.") The word is also encountered in sea shanties. In the book Shanties from the Seven Seas by Stan Hugill, in reference to its former use to denote cotton-stowers, who would move bales of cotton to and from the holds of ships and force them in tightly by means of jackscrews.

A Hoosier cabinet, often shortened to "hoosier", is a type of free-standing kitchen cabinet popular in the early decades of the twentieth century. Almost all of these cabinets were produced by companies located in Indiana and the name derives from the largest of them, the Hoosier Manufacturing Co. of New Castle, Indiana. Other Indiana businesses include Hoosier Racing Tire and the Hoosier Bat Company, manufacturer of wooden baseball bats.

The RCA Dome, former home of the Indianapolis Colts, was known as the "Hoosier Dome" before RCA purchased the naming rights in 1994. The RCA Dome was replaced by Lucas Oil Stadium in 2008.

== In popular culture ==
- Indiana native Kurt Vonnegut's book Cat's Cradle describes this identification as an example of a granfalloon.
- In the book Double Negative by David Carkeet, Wach exhorts Cook to give a PR talk, perhaps on Hoosier. As a result, Cook researches its etymology.
- In the movie The Outlaw Josey Wales (starring Clint Eastwood), a shopkeeper states "I'm a Hoosier" to the disgust of an elderly customer.
- The HBO miniseries The Pacific refers to PFC Bill Smith by the nickname "Hoosier", as do the two Marine memoirs on which the series is based.
- Adam Savage, host of the Discovery Channel series MythBusters, often refers to co-host Jamie Hyneman as a Hoosier, the latter having been raised on a farm in Indiana, and attended Indiana University.
- Serial killer Carl Panzram's last words were reportedly, "Hurry it up, you Hoosier bastard! I could kill 10 men while you're fooling around!"
- In the movie We're No Angels, Sean Penn's character says when asked to wear work clothes as a disguise, "Whaddya think I am, a Hoosier or something?"
- In the book Donnie Brasco: My Undercover Life in the Mafia, gangster Benjamin "Lefty Guns" Ruggiero uses Hoosier as an epithet.
- Hoosiers, a 1986 sports film, is about a small-town Indiana high school basketball team that wins the state championship.
- The Frugal Hoosier is a fictional discount grocery store depicted in the ABC sitcom The Middle, based in the fictional Indiana town of Orson.
- In the NBC sitcom Parks and Recreation episode "Soulmates", a fictional online dating site called "hoosiermate.com" was the main subject. The series is set in Indiana.
- The US Secret Service has designated the code name "Hoosier" for former US Vice President, former Indiana Governor, and Indiana native Mike Pence.
- On his podcast, retired Indianapolis Colts punter Pat McAfee defined the term as "a human who is willing to stand up in the face of adversity, chug two beers, and do anything he can to make America a better place. That's what a Hoosier is."
- In 1987, then-United States Senator Dan Quayle of Indiana requested of the Merriam-Webster dictionary to redefine the term "Hoosier" to mean "someone who is smart, resourceful, skillful, a winner, unique and brilliant." The dictionary denied the request.

== See also ==
- Hoosier Daddy (disambiguation)
