= Hard Attack (Dust album) =

Studio album by Dust
- Released: 1972
- Studio: Bell Sound (New York City)
- Genre: Hard rock, heavy metal
- Length: 38:30
- Label: Kama Sutra
- Producer: Kenny Aaronson, Kenny Kerner

Dust chronology
Dust (1971)	Hard Attack (1972)

Professional ratings
Review scores
Source	Rating
Sputnikmusic	4.0/5 stars
AllMusic	3.0/5 stars

Hard Attack is the second and final album by Dust, released by Kama Sutra Records in 1972. The cover art featured a previously published piece by Frank Frazetta titled "Snow Giants".

== Track listing ==
All tracks are written by Richie Wise and Kenny Kerner, except where noted

No.	Title	Writer(s)	Length
1.	"Pull Away/So Many Times"		5:02
2.	"Walk in the Soft Rain"		4:25
3.	"Thusly Spoken"		4:27
4.	"Learning to Die"	Kenny Aaronson	6:27
5.	"All in All"		4:06
6.	"I Been Thinkin'"		2:12
7.	"Ivory"		2:42
8.	"How Many Horses"		4:18
9.	"Suicide"		4:53
10.	"Entrance"		0:19

== Personnel ==
Dust

- Richie Wise - electric and acoustic guitars, vocals
- Marc Bell - drums
- Kenny Aaronson - bass, steel, dobro and bottleneck guitars

with:

- Fred Singer (of Thog) - piano, organ
- Larry Wilcox - arranger and conductor of strings

Technical

- Harry Yarmark - engineer
- Glen Christensen - art direction
