= Winner Takes It All (Sammy Hagar song) =

1987 single by Sammy Hagar

Single by Sammy Hagar

from the album Over the Top soundtrack
- B-side: "The Fight"
- Released: February 11, 1987
- Recorded: 1987
- Studio: Sound City Studios, Los Angeles CA
- Genre: Rock
- Length: 3:59
- Label: CBS, Columbia
- Songwriter(s): Giorgio Moroder, Thomas Whitlock
- Producer(s): Edward Van Halen, Sammy Hagar

Sammy Hagar singles chronology
"Swept Away" (1984)	"Winner Takes It All" (1987)	"Returning Home" (1987)

Music video
- "Winner Takes It All" on YouTube

"Winner Takes It All" is a 1987 rock song written by record producer Giorgio Moroder and Thomas Whitlock and recorded by Sammy Hagar. Originally was included in the soundtrack of the Sylvester Stallone movie Over the Top, being the first track and second single from the album, released through CBS Records. The song peaked at No. 3 on the Billboard Album Rock Tracks chart and No. 54 on their Hot 100 chart. It appears in Hagar's 2004 compilation album The Essential Red Collection.

== Background ==
In late 1986, producer / director of the film Over the Top Menahem Golan chose prestigious Italian composer and record producer Giorgio Moroder as music supervisor of the soundtrack. Moroder was in charge of creating a concept album with a compilation of new songs in different genres and diverse artists, writing most tracks on the album himself in collaboration with Tom Whitlock.

Originally, Moroder contacted John Wetton, lead singer of the rock group Asia, to sing "Winner Takes It All" for the film, but after performing the song, it was felt that his voice wasn't "mean" enough. Instead, the song was offered to Sammy Hagar, by then the successful new lead singer in Van Halen, and he was given the opportunity to choose his own session musicians.

Hagar's version features a bass guitar solo interlude by Hagar's then-bandmate Eddie Van Halen. Denny Carmassi —a longtime friend of Hagar and ex-bandmate in Montrose—also played on the track.

"Winner Takes It All" was never included on a Sammy Hagar solo studio album, and it did not appear in most of his authorized compilations. Hagar said in his video commentary for the DVD The Long Road to Cabo that he was unenthusiastic about the song, being focused on his career with Van Halen, and being used to recording his own songs.

== Music video ==
The song's music video was made via Geffen Records – then Hagar's record label – although its director was not officially accredited. It shows Sammy Hagar performs the song with his guitar, as well as a mix of some of the most vibrant scenes of the film.

The music video opens with Hagar running barefoot to the camera and playing guitar. As he sings the song, clips from the film play throughout. In the end, Hagar arm wrestles with Sylvester Stallone's character, Lincoln Hawk, and Hagar wins.

He said that Stallone gave him his black cap at the end of the shoot of the music video, both signed it, and the cap went to charity, fetching around $10,000.

== Track listing ==
1. "Winner Takes It All" – 3:58
2. "The Fight" (Instrumental) – 3:55

== Personnel ==
- Sammy Hagar – vocals, lead guitar
- Edward Van Halen – rhythm guitar, bass, backing vocals
- Denny Carmassi – drums
- Giorgio Moroder – synthesizer
- Edward Van Halen, Sammy Hagar – producers
