= Live 1980 (Sammy Hagar album) =

1983 live album by Sammy Hagar

Live album by Sammy Hagar
- Released: October 14, 1983
- Recorded: 1980
- Genre: Hard rock
- Length: 31:45
- Label: Capitol
- Producer: John Carter

Sammy Hagar chronology
| Three Lock Box (1982) | Live 1980 (1983) | Through the Fire (1984) |

Live 1980 is a live album by American rock musician Sammy Hagar, recorded in 1980 on tour for his then-newest album, Danger Zone and released in 1983.

The album mainly contains tracks from Danger Zone and its predecessor, Street Machine. It was released by Capitol Records after the success of Hagar's Geffen-era releases, Standing Hampton and Three Lock Box.

== Song information ==
While every version of this release has the track listing as noted below, the song "In the Night" continues into the next track "The Danger Zone". The rest of "The Danger Zone" is a Gary Pihl keyboard solo. "The Danger Zone", as it appears on the Danger Zone album, is not represented on this live release.

Professional ratings
Review scores
| Source | Rating |
|---|---|
| Allmusic | link |

== Track listing ==
All tracks are written by Sammy Hagar, except where stated.

| No. | Title | Writer(s) | Length |
|---|---|---|---|
| 1. | "Trans Am (Highway Wonderland)" | | 5:15 |
| 2. | "Love or Money" | | 3:57 |
| 3. | "Plain Jane" | | 2:26 |
| 4. | "20th Century Man" | Hagar, Gary Pihl | 3:59 |
| 5. | "This Planet's on Fire (Burn in Hell)" | | 5:14 |
| 6. | "In the Night (Entering the Danger Zone)" | | 1:26 |
| 7. | "The Danger Zone" | | 5:00 |
| 8. | "Space Station #5" | Hagar, Ronnie Montrose | 4:28 |

== Reissues ==
The 1996 One Way Records re-release includes a bonus live track, "Someone Out There", which has not been released elsewhere.

== Personnel ==
- Sammy Hagar – lead vocals, rhythm guitar
- Gary Pihl – lead guitar, keyboards, backing vocals
- Bill Church – bass guitar, backing vocals
- Chuck Ruff – drums, backing vocals

== Versions ==
- Capitol Records (US LP): SN-16376
- Capitol Records (Japan LP): ECS-63048
- Capitol Records (Spain LP): 064 7122991
- Capitol Records (Germany LP): 1C 064 7122991
- Capitol Records (US CD): CDP 7 48432 2
- One Way Records (1996 US Reissue): 72438 19093 24
