= Through the Fire (Hagar Schon Aaronson Shrieve album) =

Studio album by Hagar Schon Aaronson Shrieve
- Released: March 1984
- Recorded: 9–21 November 1983, December 1983
- Studio: Westwood Mobile, Fantasy Studios, Berkeley, California
- Genre: Hard rock; glam metal
- Length: 36:39
- Label: Geffen
- Producer: Sammy Hagar, Neal Schon

Sammy Hagar chronology
Live 1980 (1983)	Through the Fire (1984)	VOA (1984)

Professional ratings
Review scores
Source	Rating
AllMusic	2.5/5 stars
Robert Christgau	D+

Through the Fire is the only studio album by the band Hagar Schon Aaronson Shrieve, also known as HSAS. The album was recorded live with guitar overdubs added later. The only single, a cover of Procol Harum's "Whiter Shade of Pale", reached No. 94 on the Billboard Hot 100 chart.

== Track listing ==
All tracks are written by Sammy Hagar and Neal Schon, except where stated.

Side one
No.	Title	Length
1.	"Top of the Rock"	4:21
2.	"Missing You"	4:28
3.	"Animation"	4:55
4.	"Valley of the Kings"	3:30
5.	"Giza"	1:22

Side two
No.	Title	Writer(s)	Length
6.	"Whiter Shade of Pale" (Procol Harum cover)	Gary Brooker, Matthew Fisher, and Keith Reid	4:49
7.	"Hot and Dirty"		4:19
8.	"He Will Understand"		4:49
9.	"My Home Town"		4:06

== Personnel ==
- Sammy Hagar – lead vocals, producer
- Neal Schon – lead and rhythm guitars, producer
- Kenny Aaronson – bass
- Michael Shrieve – drums

Production

- Don Smith – engineer, mixing
- Greg Ladanyi – mixing
- Doug Sax, Mike Reese – mastering

== Singles ==
- "Whiter Shade of Pale" b/w "Hot And Dirty" – US (Geffen 29280-7)
- "Whiter Shade of Pale" b/w "Hot And Dirty" – Japan (Geffen 07SP 804)
- "Whiter Shade of Pale" b/w "Whiter Shade of Pale (edit)" – US Promo (Geffen 7-29280)
- "Whiter Shade of Pale" b/w etched signatures in wax – US Promo (Geffen PRO-A-2142)

== Releases ==
- Geffen (US) : GHS 4023
- Geffen (Japan) : 23AP 2825
- Geffen (Netherlands) : GEF 25893
- Geffen (US) : CD 050059.2
