= Turn Up the Music! =

Turn Up The Music!

Compilation album by Sammy Hagar
- Released: 1993
- Recorded: 1976–1980
- Genre: Rock
- Length: 35:02
- Label: Cema Special Markets

Sammy Hagar chronology
The Best of Sammy Hagar (1992)	Turn Up The Music! (1993)	Unboxed (1994)

Professional ratings
Review scores
Source	Rating
Allmusic	2/5 stars

Turn Up The Music! is a Sammy Hagar compilation album and is named after one of his early fan favorite tracks. It is available with at least two different covers.

== Song information ==
- Steve Perry appears on the track "Run For Your Life".
- Neal Schon appears on the track "Love Or Money".

== Track listing ==
1. "Trans Am (Highway Wonderland)" (Sammy Hagar) - 3:31
2. "Plain Jane" (Sammy Hagar) - 3:48
3. "The Iceman" (Sammy Hagar) - 4:12
4. "Run For Your Life" (Steve Gould/Pidgeon) - 4:22
5. "I've Done Everything for You" (Sammy Hagar) - 3:25
6. "Rock 'N' Roll Weekend" (Sammy Hagar) - 3:43
7. "Turn Up the Music" (John Carter/Sammy Hagar) - 5:46
8. "Urban Guerilla" (John Carter/Sammy Hagar) - 2:52
9. "Love or Money" (Sammy Hagar) - 3:57
10. "Reckless" (Sammy Hagar) - 3:34
