= Over the Top (1987 film) =

Film by Menahem Golan

- Theatrical release poster
- Directed by: Menahem Golan
- Screenplay by: Stirling Silliphant; Sylvester Stallone
- Story by: Gary Conway; David C. Engelbach
- Produced by: Menahem Golan; Yoram Globus
- Starring: Sylvester Stallone; Robert Loggia; Susan Blakely; David Mendenhall
- Cinematography: David Gurfinkel
- Edited by: James Symons; Don Zimmerman
- Music by: Giorgio Moroder
- Color process: Metrocolor
- Production company: The Cannon Group, Inc.
- Distributed by: Warner Bros.
- Release dates: February 12, 1987 (New York and Los Angeles); February 13, 1987 (United States)
- Running time: 93 minutes
- Country: United States
- Language: English
- Budget: $25 million
- Box office: $16,057,580

Over the Top is a 1987 American sports drama film directed by Menahem Golan, and written by Stirling Silliphant and Sylvester Stallone, who stars as Lincoln Hawk, a long-haul truck driver who tries to win back his estranged son Michael while becoming a champion arm wrestler. Robert Loggia, Susan Blakely, and David Mendenhall are among the supporting cast.

Over the Top was released on February 13, 1987, by Warner Bros. in the United States. The film was a box-office bomb, and received middling reviews from critics but has made a cult following ever since.

== Plot ==
Lincoln Hawk (called Lincoln Hawks in the trailer and sometimes inconsistently in the movie itself) is a truck driver who also arm wrestles for extra cash. He had left his family ten years ago and has a young son named Michael. His estranged wife Christina, who is in the hospital suffering from heart disease, asks that Hawk pick up Michael from military school and develop a relationship with him. Christina's wealthy father – Jason Cutler – believes that Hawk has no right to be in his grandson's life. Michael distrusts Hawk initially and treats him with contempt.

Over the course of a road trip from Colorado to California, the two bond. When they arrive at the hospital, Christina has died from complications during surgery. Michael blames Hawk for delaying his arrival and leaves for Cutler's estate.

After Christina's funeral, Hawk is arrested for ramraiding Cutler's gated mansion to try to see his son. Michael visits Hawk in jail and forgives him but chooses to live with Cutler. As a condition of charges being dropped, Hawk signs over custody of Michael to Cutler.

Hawk leaves to compete in the World Armwrestling Championship in Las Vegas, hoping to start a trucking company with the prize money. Most other participants are much larger, including Bull Hurley, the undefeated world champion for the past five years. When Hawk arrives, he sells his truck and uses the proceeds to place a bet on himself (as a 20–1 long shot) to win. Meanwhile, Michael learns that Cutler had driven Lincoln and Christina apart and had been hiding letters Hawk had written to him. Stunned by Cutler's deceptions, Michael steals a pickup truck and drives to Las Vegas to find Hawk.

Hawk advances to the final eight competitors in the double-elimination tournament before suffering his first loss, injuring his arm in the process. Cutler, who is also in Las Vegas, summons Hawk to his hotel suite and offers him $500,000 and a top-of-the-line semi on the condition that he stay out of their lives for good, but Hawk refuses and vows to retrieve Michael after the tournament. He returns to the competition with improved focus and advances to the final match against Hurley. Michael finds Hawk and apologizes for misjudging him, which gives Hawk the emotional support to compete. After a long match, Hawk beats Hurley and wins the tournament. Hawk and Michael take their winnings and drive off to start a new life together.

== Cast ==
- Sylvester Stallone as Lincoln "Linc" Hawk
- Robert Loggia as Jason Cutler
- Susan Blakely as Christina Hawk
- Rick Zumwalt as Bob "Bull" Hurley
- David Mendenhall as Michael "Mike" Hawk
- Chris McCarty as Tim Salanger
- Terry Funk as Ruker
- Bruce Way as John Grizzly
- Paul Sullivan as Carl Adams
- Jimmy Keegan as Richie
- Greg "Magic" Schwartz as Smasher
- Allan Graf as Collins
- John Braden as Col. Davis
- Reggie Bennett as Female Arm Wrestler

Multiple world armwrestling champions John Brzenk, Cleve Dean, Scott Norton, Allen Fisher, John Vreeland and Andrew "Cobra" Rhodes (who plays the final match referee) also make cameo appearances. Randy Raney, who would appear with Stallone the following year in Rambo III, plays Mad Dog Madison.

Wrestler Terry Funk, who played Ruker, had a long working relationship with Stallone since appearing in Stallone's 1978 film Paradise Alley.

== Production ==
=== Development and writing ===
In May 1984, it was reported Sylvester Stallone would appear in the film for a fee of $12 million. Cannon Films presold the movie over the next few years, during which time Stallone appeared in Rhinestone, Rambo: First Blood Part II and Rocky IV.

Cannon hired Stirling Silliphant to write the script. "It's an action love story with the emphasis on action," Silliphant says. "It's the story of a man trying to win back the love of his son and win the world arm-wrestling championship in Las Vegas." Although Stallone was a writer and had final cut on the film, Sillphant said "I don't anticipate any problem whatsoever. I'm a very difficult person to abuse... He doesn't have to do anything at this point. He has been very smart about what he can do. He has to protect that."

=== Filming ===
The film was shot for about 9 weeks from June 9 to August 15, 1986. The military academy scenes, portrayed as being in Colorado, were filmed at Pomona College in Claremont, California in 1986. The Kirkeby mansion at 750 Bel Air Road, Los Angeles (also the home of the Clampett family on the CBS comedy The Beverly Hillbillies) was used to portray the Cutler estate. Parts of the film were also shot in Monument Valley, Utah. Olive View–UCLA Medical Center was also used as the hospital.

== Music ==
In late 1986, producer/director Menahem Golan selected Italian composer and record producer Giorgio Moroder as music supervisor for the soundtrack. Moroder was in charge of creating a concept album with a compilation of new songs in different genres and diverse artists, writing most tracks on the record himself, in collaboration with Tom Whitlock.

The album was issued on February 13, 1987, under CBS, to coincide with the release of the movie. It contains music by Frank Stallone, Kenny Loggins (who performs the film's central theme, "Meet Me Half Way"), Eddie Money and Sammy Hagar. John Wetton, lead singer of the rock group Asia, sang "Winner Takes It All" for the movie, but after performing the song, it was felt that his voice wasn't "mean" enough, so the track was offered to Hagar, whose version, featuring a bass guitar solo by Hagar's then-Van Halen bandmate Eddie Van Halen, ended up being the one on the soundtrack. Asia is credited for the track "Gypsy Soul", but Wetton is the only Asia member who actually contributed to it.

Track listing:

1. "Winner Takes It All" – Sammy Hagar
2. "In This Country" – Robin Zander (international versions of the film had Eddie Money singing instead)
3. "Take It Higher" – Larry Greene
4. "All I Need Is You" – Big Trouble
5. "Bad Nite" – Frank Stallone
6. "Meet Me Half Way" – Kenny Loggins
7. "Gypsy Soul" – Asia
8. "The Fight (Instrumental)" – Giorgio Moroder
9. "Mind Over Matter" – Larry Greene
10. "I Will Be Strong" – Eddie Money

Sylvester Stallone appears in the video for "Winner Takes It All", arm-wrestling Hagar. Hagar says in his video commentary on the DVD The Long Road to Cabo that he was unenthusiastic about the song. Hagar says that Stallone gave him his black cap at the end of the shoot, both signed it, and the cap went to charity, fetching around $10,000.

== Reception ==
=== Box office ===
Theatrical international release poster by Renato Casaro

Over the Top was released by Warner Bros. Pictures on Thursday, February 12, 1987, in New York and Los Angeles before expanding to 1,758 theaters on Friday, grossing $5.1 million over the President's Day weekend, finishing in fourth place. In total, the film earned $16 million in the US and Canada.

=== Critical response ===
On Rotten Tomatoes, the film has an approval rating of 32% based on 31 reviews, with an average rating of 4.7/10. The site's consensus states: "The definitive film about arm-wrestling truck drivers fighting for custody of their children, Over the Top lives down to its title in the cheesiest of ways." On Metacritic, it has a score of 40 out of 100 based on reviews from 12 critics, indicating "mixed or average reviews." Audiences polled by CinemaScore gave the film an average grade of "B+" on an A+ to F scale.

Variety called it "routinely made in every respect". Janet Maslin of The New York Times called it "muddled" and criticized the number of product placements. Rita Kempley of The Washington Post wrote that the film does not live up to Stallone's Rocky films and is "virtually a feature-length video" because of all the rock songs.

Movie historian Leonard Maltin seemed to agree: "Title merely begins to describe this heavy-handed variation on The Champ...In trying to underplay, Stallone speaks so quietly that you often can't make out what he's saying."

The film received three nominations at the 8th Golden Raspberry Awards in 1988. David Mendenhall won two awards for both Worst Supporting Actor and Worst New Star, and Stallone was nominated for Worst Actor, which he lost to Bill Cosby for Leonard Part 6.

Stallone later said of the film, "I would have made it less glossy and set it more in an urban environment, for one. Next, I would've not used a never-ending stream of rock songs, but scored music instead, and most likely would've made the event in Vegas more ominous – not so carnival-like."
