= Jesse Harms =

American musician (born 1952)

- Born: Jesse Harms
- Genres: Rock
- Occupations: Musician; Songwriter
- Instruments: Keyboards, Vocals

Jesse Harms (born July 6, 1952, in Massachusetts) is an American musician and songwriter. He has worked with Sammy Hagar, David Lee Roth, Eddie Money, REO Speedwagon, Bad English, Guitar Shorty, Patty Smyth, and McAuley Schenker Group.

== Early life ==
Harms was raised in Berkeley, California. He began playing the piano at 8 years old and studied classical music until he was 15. He lost interest in classical at that time, and in high school started playing the organ with a band called Zephyr, later Rags. They became friends with another band, Cookin' Mama, that guitarist Pat Thrall played in, and around 1971 some combining of the members took place. After high school Harms attended the University of California, Berkeley but dropped out to concentrate on music. During the next few years Harms studied piano with some very good jazz teachers notably, Bill Bell (Carmen McRae), Tom Coster (Santana, Gabor Szabo) and Wilbert Baranco.

== Career ==
=== 1970s ===
In the early 70's Harms formed a band called “Rags” with Pat Thrall (Pat Travers Band, Meatloaf ) and Kelly Keagy (Night Ranger). After trying to write original songs, the band started playing covers in clubs to earn a living. Pat was unhappy with the decision and left. The band went on to play clubs in California, Hawaii, Oregon, and Alaska from 1973 to 1978. Harms realized that he wasn't getting any closer to his goal of playing on records so, with Pat Thrall's help he met Alphonso Johnson (Weather Report) who was trying to form a progressive rock band for Elektra/Asylum Records. After moving to L.A., Harms spent the next year writing songs with Alphonso, forming a band that included Vinnie Appice (Dio, Black Sabbath) and Joe Turano (Michael Bolton) and making a record. Unfortunately, Electra/Asylum dropped the album before its release. Through his friend Darrel Verdusco (John Hiatt, Mickey Thomas), Harms met John Hiatt. John was unsigned at the time, but he had a good band and some club dates in L.A. So, Harms joined his band. Through John, Harms met Ry Cooder.

=== 1980s ===
Ry asked Harms to play on his Borderline album and then signed John and his band to tour Europe as his backup musicians in the winter of 1980 to promote the record. A U.S. Tour followed in 1981. Hiatt signed with Geffen Records and the rest of 1981 was spent recording the CD All of a Sudden in New York and London with Tony Visconti as producer. The album was released in 1982 and a tour opening for Graham Parker followed, but the album had poor sales and Hiatt let the band go. Immediately, Harms joined his friend Pat Thrall again to tour in support of Pat's new project The Hughes/Thrall Band with Glenn Hughes (Deep Purple, Trapeze) and Tommy Aldridge (Black Oak Arkansas, Ozzy Osbourne, Whitesnake). The band toured the U.S. playing arenas as the opening act for Santana. But that album also had poor sales and was dissolved. Soon after Harms got a call from producer Keith Olsen to do some additional recording on a single from Three Lock Box an album he had made for Sammy Hagar. Hagar had been hiring a studio keyboard player and a studio backup singer to make his last two records and he had nobody in his band to reproduce the parts on tour, so in late 1982 Harms joined his band. Most of 1983 was spent on the road touring to support Three Lock Box. The album earned a Gold Record and the tour sold-out arenas all across the U.S. 1984–85 were spent making Sammy Hagar's platinum album VOA (which included one of Harms's songs, Don't Make Me Wait and the support tour, which was one of the most successful tours of the year, selling out arenas and stadiums in the U.S. In 1985 Hagar opted to join Van Halen, the last date his old band played was Farm Aid at University of Illinois stadium which featured Eddie Van Halen on guitar. In late 1985 Harms focused on writing songs and in early 1986 he got a call from Ted Templeman again to work on David Lee Roth's platinum Eat 'Em and Smile album (Steve Vai, Billy Sheehan, Greg Bissonette). After playing on the album, Harms turned down Roth's offer to join Roth's band in order to work on his own songwriting. Most of 1986 was spent trying to form his own band under the guidance of John Kalodner at Geffen Records. In 1987 he reunited with Sammy Hagar to record Hagar's I Never Said Goodbye album that also featured Eddie Van Halen on bass. The album included one of Harms's songs Back Into You and went Gold in the U.S. In 1987 Harms signed a publishing contract with Geffen Music and spent the rest of the year unsuccessfully trying to put together his own band. In 1988 one of Harms's songs, Walk On Water was recorded by Eddie Money and went on to reach #9 on the Billboard Hot 100 and was a number one Rock track as well as a number one MTV video. The album Nothing to Lose went Gold, Walk on Water also was on Eddie's Greatest Hits which sold Platinum. Harms is credited with co-writing the title track of FM (British band)'s 1989 album Tough It Out, which spent two weeks in the British top 40.

In 1989 Harms toured with Eddie Money as part of his band that included original guitarist Jimmy Lyon. Later in 1989 he began writing songs with Kevin Cronin (REO Speedwagon). At the time REO was inactive but with the support of management the band was reformed. His friend Dave Amato (Ted Nugent, Cher) was added on guitar and Brian Hitt (Wang Chung) on drums.

=== 1990s ===
1990 was spent writing and touring with REO Speedwagon as well as recording their CD The Earth, A Small Man, His Dog And A Chicken, which Harms co-produced and included Live It Up which reached #6 on the Rock Chart and 5 more of his songs. During 1990 Harms also wrote a song, Fallen From Grace that appeared on Heart's Double Platinum CD Brigade. Harms left REO in 1991 to get married and focus on Songwriting for MCA Music. 1991 through 1995 were spent in L.A. as a staff writer producing songs that appeared on CD's by Patty Smyth (Gold Record), Bad English (European #1), MSG, and Johnny Van Zandt etc. In 1996 Harms co-wrote a song (Both Sides Now) with Sammy Hagar, which brought them back together. In 1997 he worked on Sammy's Marching To Mars CD, playing keyboards and co-writing 6 songs. Sammy and Harms then put together a band that would later be called the Waboritas and toured in 1997–1998 to support the Album, which went Gold. In 1998-1999 he was the co-producer and Pro-Tools engineer, as well as playing keys and singing on the Hagar CD Red Voodoo which included 3 of his songs. The band toured in 1998–1999 to support the album which went Gold. The CD included the #1 rock track Mas Tequila which helped launch Sammy's Cabo Wabo tequila brand.

=== 2000s ===
In 2000 Harms co-produced, played keys and sang on Sammy's Ten 13 CD which included one of his songs and the band toured into 2001 to support the album. In 2002 Sammy released Not 4 Sale which included Harms's song Things've Changed which was the only single released from the CD.

2002-2003 also included the “Heavyweights of Rock” tour with David Lee Roth and more touring in support of the ill-fated Not 4 Sale.

In 2004 Harms was the Producer and Pro-Tools engineer on Guitar Shorty's CD Watch Your Back which also included 5 of his songs as well as writing, producing and engineering his own solo CD The Best of What I've Got. Harms also wrote 3 songs, including the title track, on Guitar Shorty's follow up CD We the People which won the Handy Blues Award. In 2005 Harms purchased a Marin Music Center in Novato, California which he operated until he sold it in 2019.

== Discography ==
=== with Sammy Hagar solo ===
- VOA (1984)
- I Never Said Goodbye (1987)
- Marching to Mars (1997)

=== with Sammy Hagar and The Waboritas ===
- Red Voodoo (1999)
- Ten 13 (2000)
- Not 4 Sale (2002)

=== with David Lee Roth ===
- Eat 'Em and Smile (1986)

=== with Eddie Money ===
- Nothing to Lose (1988)

=== with REO Speedwagon ===
- The Earth, a Small Man, His Dog and a Chicken (1990)

=== with McAuley Schenker Group ===
- M.S.G. (1991)

=== Jesse Harms solo ===
- The Best of What I've Got (2004)
