= Red Voodoo =

1999 studio album by Sammy Hagar and the Waboritas

Studio album by Sammy Hagar and The Waboritas
- Released: March 23, 1999
- Recorded: 1998
- Genre: Hard rock
- Length: 48:21
- Label: MCA
- Producer: Sammy Hagar & Jesse Harms

Sammy Hagar and The Waboritas chronology
Marching to Mars (1997)	Red Voodoo (1999)	Ten 13 (2000)

Professional ratings
Review scores
Source	Rating
AllMusic	3/5 stars

Red Voodoo is the eleventh studio album by American rock musician Sammy Hagar, and his first album to feature his band the Waboritas. This album was released on March 23, 1999, by MCA Records. When Hagar finished touring in support of his Marching to Mars album, he recorded this album. Red Voodoo is an extension of the party atmosphere that permeated Hagar's concerts on that tour and the album contains a party-vibe. "Mas Tequila" was the lead single and alluded to Hagar's other career endeavor, as his Cabo Wabo tequila was being distributed throughout the United States.

== Song information ==
- The arrangement of "Mas Tequila" is based on the Gary Glitter song "Rock and Roll Part 2"; hence Glitter and Mike Leander receiving songwriting credits.
- "Don't Fight It (Feel It)" was performed live by another of Hagar's bands, Los Tres Gusanos, before it was released on Red Voodoo.
- "The Love" originates from an unreleased song by Hagar's short lived rock supergroup Hagar Schon Aaronson Shrieve named "Ever Since You Came"

== Track listing ==
No.	Title	Writer(s)	Length
1.	"Mas Tequila"	Gary Glitter, Sammy Hagar, Mike Leander	4:11
2.	"Shag"	Hagar, Jesse Harms	3:34
3.	"Sympathy for the Human"	Hagar	4:47
4.	"Red Voodoo"	Hagar	3:48
5.	"Lay Your Hand on Me"	Hagar	4:10
6.	"High and Dry Again"	Hagar	5:35
7.	"The Revival"	Hagar, Harms	3:38
8.	"Don't Fight It (Feel It)"	Wilson Pickett	3:12
9.	"The Love"	Larry Dvoskin, Hagar, Neal Schon	4:07
10.	"Right on Right"	Hagar	5:22
11.	"Returning of the Wish"	Dvoskin, Hagar, Harms	5:53

== Personnel ==
- Sammy Hagar – lead vocals, guitar
- Victor Johnson – guitar
- Jesse Harms – keyboards
- Mona Gnader – bass guitar
- David Lauser – drums

=== Additional personnel ===
- Roy Rogers – 'Bad ass Slide guitar' on "Don't Fight It (Feel It)"
- Tower of Power – horns on "'Don't Fight It (Feel It)"

== Live In Cabo ==
Live In Cabo disc (1999)

Red Voodoo was sold with a bonus disc at Best Buy retail stores. The mini-CD was recorded at the band's first performance together by the SFX Radio Network. The performance was from the Cabo Wabo Cantina in Los Cabos, Mexico, on May 17, 1997.

1. "Red" (John Carter/Sammy Hagar) – 4:52
2. "Heavy Metal" (Sammy Hagar/Jim Peterik) – 4:25
3. "Right Now" (Michael Anthony/Sammy Hagar/Alex Van Halen/Edward Van Halen) – 4:39

== Singles ==
- "Mas Tequila" b/w "Little White Lie" US (MCA TRKS7 55574)
- "Mas Tequila (Radio Edit)" b/w "Little White Lie (Album Version)" US (MCA TRK5P 4304)
- "Mas Tequila (Radio Edit)" b/w "Shag" Europe (MCA 155 582-2)
- "Mas Tequila" b/w "Shag (Miami mix)" b/w "The Revival (Miami mix)" US (MCA)
- "Shag (Version One)" b/w "Shag (Version Two)" US (MCA TRK5P-4367)
- "Right On Right (Radio Edit)" US (MCA TRK5P-4407) TRK5P-4367

== Versions ==
MCA Records (US) : TRKD 118727
MCA Records (Japan) : MVCE 24135 (includes the "Right Now" track from the Live in Cabo disc.)
MCA Records (Taiwan) : TRKD 11872
