= Marky Ramone =

American drummer (born 1952)

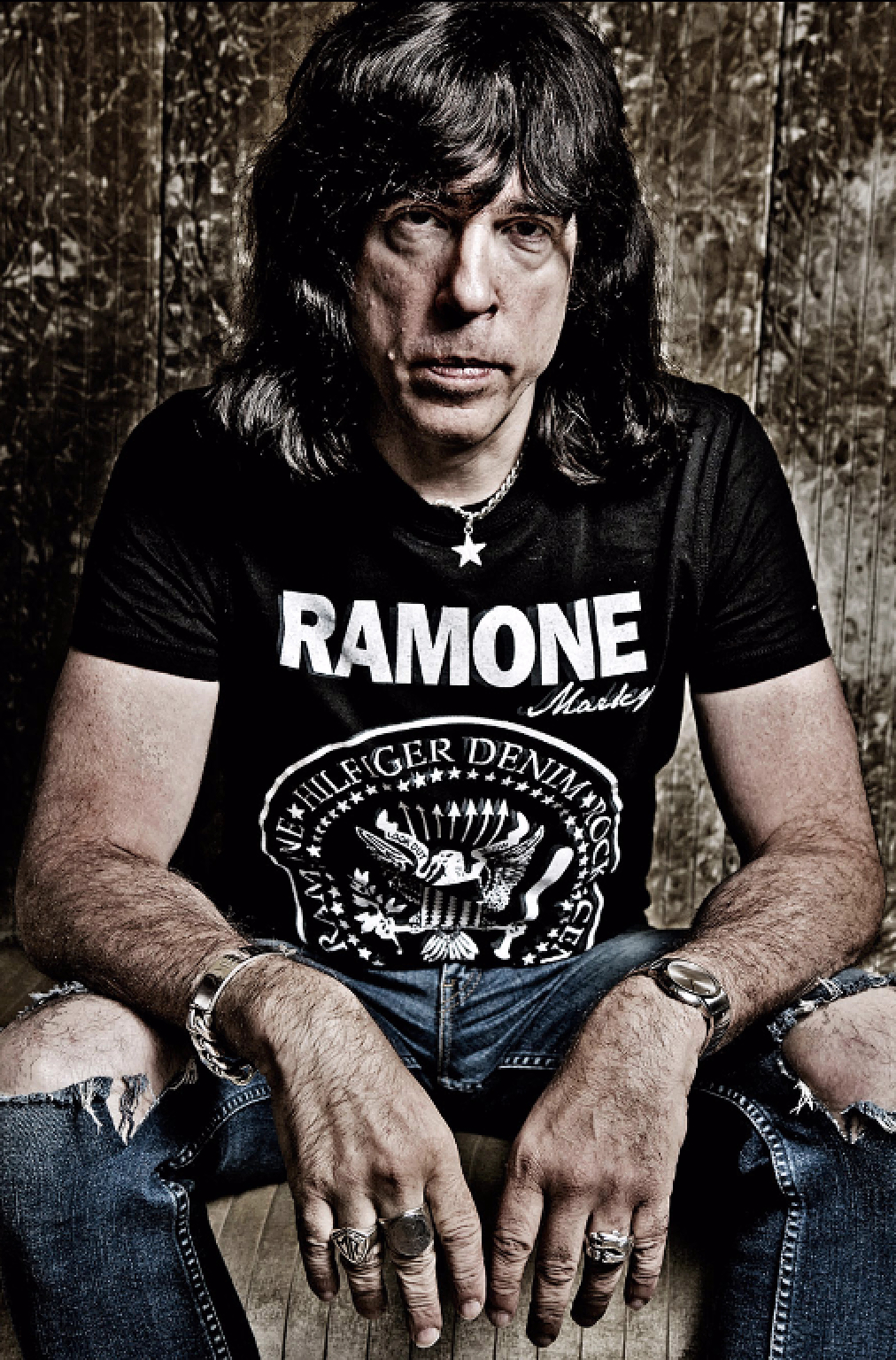
- Ramone in 2009

Background information
- Born: Marc Steven Bell; July 15, 1952 (age 74); New York City, U.S.
- Genres: Punk rock; heavy metal; hard rock
- Occupation: Musician
- Instruments: Drums; percussion
- Years active: 1969–present
- Website: markyramone.com

Signature
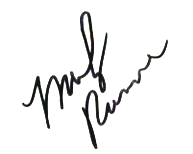

Marc Steven Bell (born July 15, 1952), better known as Marky Ramone, is an American drummer. He began playing in hard rock bands in the New York City area, notably Dust and Estus. He was asked to drum for the punk rock band Richard Hell and the Voidoids. He replaced drummer Tommy Ramone in the Ramones in 1978 and played with the band from 1978 to 1983 and 1987 to 1996: their longest-serving drummer. He has also played drums for other punk rock and heavy metal bands including his own band, Marky Ramone and the Intruders. As of 2026, he is one of three surviving members of the band, the others being Richie Ramone and C.J. Ramone. He continues to keep the Ramones' legacy alive around the world with his band Marky Ramone's Blitzkrieg.

Ramone lives in Brooklyn Heights with his wife, Marion Flynn. In 2015, he released his autobiography, Punk Rock Blitzkrieg: My Life as a Ramone.

== Early life ==
According to his autobiography, Bell and his twin brother Fred were born at New York Infirmary for Indigent Women and Children on July 15, 1952; he is of Dutch ancestry on his father's side and French on his mother's side. His father was a longshoreman, while his mother ran the Brooklyn College music library.

== Music career ==
Bell began playing drums in 1971 with the hard rock band Dust, featuring Kenny Aaronson on bass and Richie Wise on guitar, and produced by Kenny Kerner. Bell recorded two albums with the band before getting into the punk scene. In late 1972, following the death of the New York Dolls' original drummer Billy Murcia, Bell was the only seriously considered alternative to the eventually chosen Jerry Nolan. "Jerry and I knew each other," he said. "When Billy died, I went down to the loft where the Dolls were auditioning... I could do different time signatures, different accents, and I basically overplayed it – put in all these drum fills that weren't necessary. And Jerry just kept the beat straight. So Jerry got it and I didn't."

In 1973, Marky joined Estus and recorded an album of the same name, produced by the Rolling Stones' first producer, Andrew Loog Oldham. Bandmates for Estus included Harry Rumpf and Tom and John Nicholas. In the mid-1970s, Bell joined Wayne County & The Backstreet Boys, then moved onto Richard Hell and the Voidoids and played on their first album, Blank Generation.

Following the departure of Tommy Ramone, Marky would be chosen as the next drummer for the Ramones. Marky would claim that before this point, he had had a conversation with Dee Dee Ramone in which Dee Dee had mentioned Tommy's departure from the band, and he was asked the question if he would ever join the Ramones. Marky responded with, "I guess I would." Following this, a month later, he would claim that he had been waiting on Johnny to know his situation with the group and would be told, "Danny and Linda want you to audition, but I think you're in." At auditions Marky would play "I Don't Care", "Sheena Is a Punk Rocker", and "Rockaway Beach". Marky would ultimately be chosen as the next drummer and would be coached by Tommy Ramone on the drumming style.

Marky was with the Ramones for the next five years. He starred in the movie Rock 'n' Roll High School, recorded the anthem "I Wanna Be Sedated", and worked with producer Phil Spector. After five albums with Dee Dee, Joey, and Johnny Ramone, Marky was asked to leave the band in February 1983 following an incident regarding his drinking problem. The night before a show in Virginia Beach, he would become drunk in Columbus, where he was staying with a friend. Marky would claim that he had drunk with Roger Maris of the New York Yankees and would subsequently sleep in. The following day a groupie who had promised to drive him to the gig in Virginia Beach would later claim the next day that she could not drive. This would lead to a show cancellation and Marky having to pay per diems. Another incident would involve Dee Dee Ramone discovering a vodka bottle hidden in a trashcan and drinking between sessions in the bathroom during the recordings for Subterranean Jungle. He was replaced by Richie Ramone, who was himself replaced four years later by Clem Burke of Blondie (under the name Elvis Ramone), who was asked to leave after only two shows.

Marky would reach sobriety following his departure from the band. According to Marky, this followed an incident where he was driving drunk and had blacked out at the wheel, subsequently crashing into a furniture store. He also attributed his sobriety to an incident where he and roadie Little Matt were driving down Ocean Avenue in Brooklyn when the electrical wiring of the vehicle had become ignited by what was presumed to be cigarette ash, leading to them jumping out of the vehicle. Marky claimed that following these events he had chosen to check into a rehabilitation clinic in Long Island for two weeks but would subsequently fall back into drinking. During this period he would attempt to stop on his own, and in one event at his parents' house, he had experienced bouts of psychosis, leading him to return home. During this period he would also attend AA meetings.

He returned to the Ramones clean and sober in August 1987 following the departure of Richie Ramone and subsequent firing of Elvis Ramone. Marky would claim that he was good friends with the girlfriend of Richie and that she had told him he had left the band. This would lead to Marky calling Monte Melnick to discover what had happened, which would then lead to him having a meeting with Johnny Ramone. Additionally, the band had been secretly rehearsing on the side when Elvis had joined with Marky.

In total, he played 1,700 shows and recorded ten studio albums with the band (the most records amongst the band's drummers) until their retirement in August 1996.

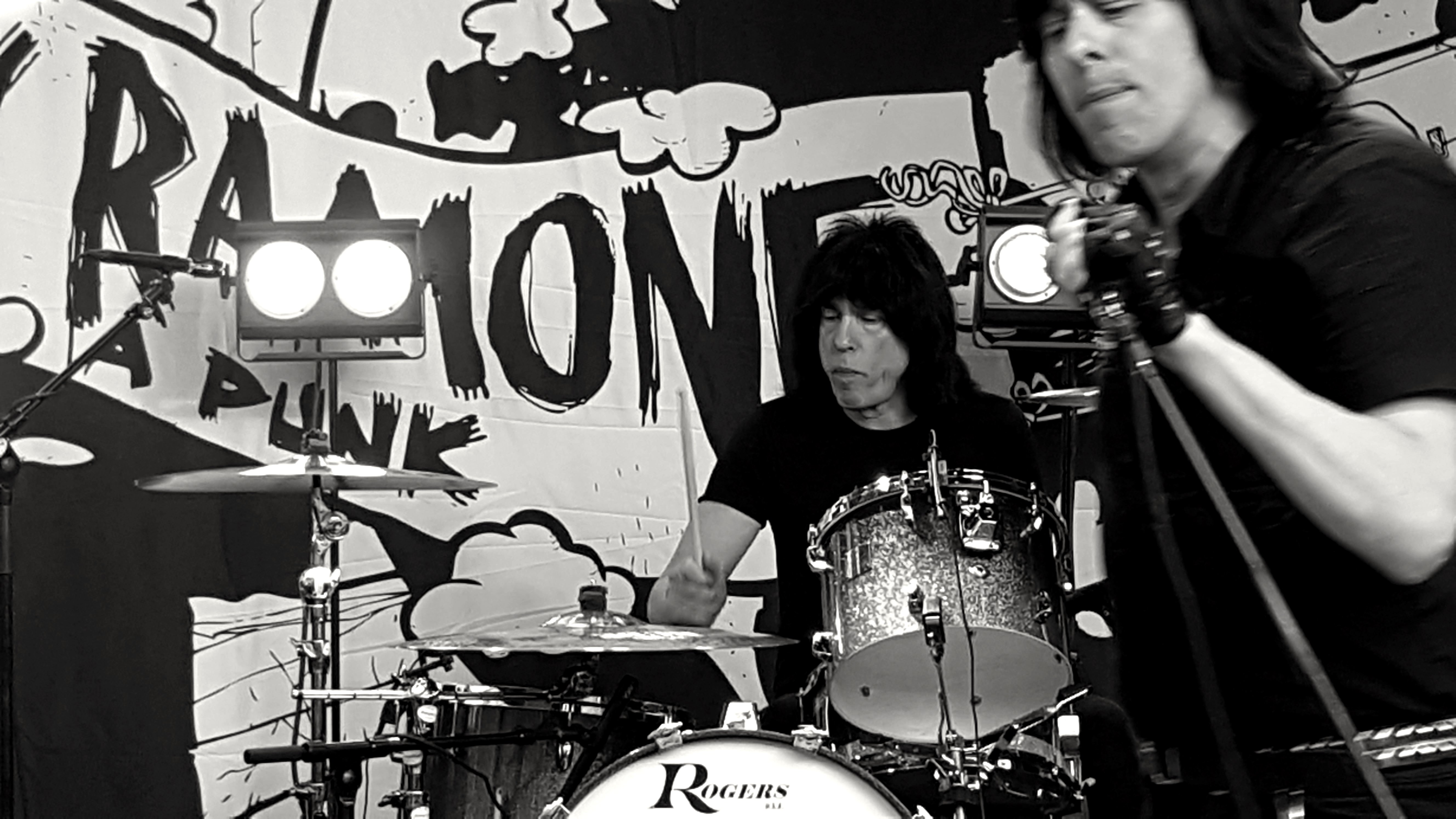
Ramone and Ken Stringfellow, 2016

In 1996, Marky joined Dee Dee Ramone to form the Ramainz, performing Ramones songs.

In 2000, Marky joined Joey to record Joey's solo album, entitled Don't Worry About Me. Joey told talk show host Joe Franklin that Marky was his favorite drummer along with Keith Moon.

In 1997 and 1999, Marky recorded two albums with his solo band, Marky Ramone and the Intruders. In 2001, he was presented with a lifetime achievement award from MTV by U2 singer Bono. In September 2004, Ramone served as executive producer and released a Ramones DVD entitled Ramones: Raw, which featured footage of the band while on tour all over the world along with other various rare, vintage footage. Much of the candid footage is courtesy of Marky Ramone's personal video library. Ramones: Raw is the only certified gold-selling Ramones DVD and one of only two US gold-selling releases in the entire Ramones catalog, the other being the greatest hits double LP Ramones Mania. Ramones: Raw is also the highest-charting release in Ramones history.

On April 22, 2008, Marky Ramone appeared on a new CD in Canada, playing drums with the Canadian punk band Teenage Head. The CD was called Teenage Head with Marky Ramone; it was released in the USA on June 10, 2008.

== Other work ==
=== Radio ===
Since 2005, he has hosted the show Punk Rock Blitzkrieg on SiriusXM. The show was originally aired on Faction (formerly Channel 41) but has since been moved to 1st Wave (Channel 33) following the launch of Turbo on Channel 41 and the relocation of Faction to Channel 314 as an Xtra Channel. The show has been renamed to Marky Ramone's 1st Wave Blitzkrieg. In April 2018, Marky Ramone's Punk Rock Blitzkrieg launched as a 24/7 channel (Channel 712) available online only for Sirius XM subscribers. The channel features previously aired recordings of Marky Ramone's 1st Wave Blitzkrieg.

=== Television ===
- In 1993, Ramone appeared with the Ramones in the episode "Rosebud" of The Simpsons.
- In October 2001, Ramone appeared on MTV, accepting his lifetime achievement award presented by Bono of U2.
- Ramone appeared on Anthony Bourdain: No Reservations twice. On the 2007 Cleveland episode, he ate with Bourdain at the Michael Symon restaurant Lola and also toured the Rock and Roll Hall of Fame and Museum. Bourdain said Bell approved of the Ramones exhibit. On the 2010 "No Reservations Holiday Special", the two gather around a table and discuss what they want from Santa Claus (he wanted a hard-to-get Italian sports car).
- In 2017, Ramone voiced a cartoon version of himself for Cartoon Network's series Uncle Grandpa on the season 5 episode "Late Night Good Morning with Uncle Grandpa".
- In 2017, Ramone appeared on the AMC show Comic Book Men where he showed a piece of art he had created: a toy robot composed of old cellphones.

=== Business ===
- In 2009, Ramone teamed up with Tommy Hilfiger's Hilfiger Denim to launch his own clothing line consisting of leather jackets, jeans, and T-shirts, and his own beer line.
- He has his own line of pasta sauce, "Marky Ramone's Brooklyn's Own Pasta Sauce".

=== Books ===
In 2015, Ramone released his autobiography, Punk Rock Blitzkrieg: My Life as a Ramone.

== Discography ==
=== Solo ===
With Marky Ramone and the Intruders

- 1996: Marky Ramone & the Intruders
- 1999: The Answer to Your Problems? (Note: The South American version of The Answer to Your Problems? was titled Don't Blame Me.)

With Mark Ramone and the Speed Kings

- 2001: No If's, And's or But's (album) (Note: Legends Bleed is the United States expanded reissue of No If's, And's or But's.)
- 2002: Legends Bleed

Compilation

- 2006: Start of the Century (disc 1 with the Intruders, disc 2 solo live album of Ramones covers)

=== Band work ===
With Dust

- 1971: Dust
- 1972: Hard Attack

With Estus

- 1973: Estus

With The Voidoids

- 1977: Blank Generation

With the Ramones

- 1978: Road to Ruin
- 1979: Rock 'n' Roll High School soundtrack
- 1980: End of the Century
- 1981: Pleasant Dreams
- 1983: Subterranean Jungle
- 1989: Brain Drain
- 1992: Loco Live (Live)
- 1992: Mondo Bizarro
- 1993: Acid Eaters
- 1995: ¡Adios Amigos!
- 1996: Greatest Hits Live (live)
- 1997: We're Outta Here! (live)

With The Ramainz:

- 1999: Live in N.Y.C. (live)

With Misfits:

- 2003: Project 1950

With Osaka Popstar:

- 2006: Osaka Popstar and the American Legends of Punk

With Teenage Head:

- 2008: Teenage Head with Marky Ramone

=== Session work ===
With Dee Dee Ramone:

- 1989: Standing in the Spotlight
- 1997: Zonked/Ain't It Fun (Note: The United States version of Zonked was titled Ain't It Fun.)

With Joey Ramone:

- 2001: "Merry Christmas (I Don't Want to Fight Tonight)"
- 2002: Don't Worry About Me (album)

With Raimundos:

- 2001 - Éramos Quatro - (Tracks 8 and 13: "I Don't Care" and "Blitzkrieg Bop")

With Tequila Baby:

- 2002 - Punk Rock Até Os Ossos - (Track 2: Seja Com O Sol, Seja Com A Lua)
- 2006 - Marky Ramone & Tequila Baby (also released on DVD)

With Cherie Currie:

- 2007 – Cherry Bomb

With Bluesman:

- 2008: "Stop Thinking" (single)

With Marky Ramone's Blitzkrieg:

- 2010: "When We Were Angels" (single)
- 2011: "If and When" (single)

=== Music videos ===
Ramone produced, with Callicore Studio, two animated videos illustrating two songs from the Marky Ramone and the Intruders albums.

- 2015: "I Wanna Win the Lottery"
- 2016: "I Want My Beer"

== Filmography ==
- 1979: Rock 'n' Roll High School (himself)
- 1980: Blank Generation (member of the Voidoids)
- 1993: Ramones – Around the World (himself, director, producer)
- 1994: Space Ghost Coast to Coast (himself)
- 1997: We're Outta Here! (himself)
- 2002: The Brooklyn Boys (Tommy)
- 2003: End of the Century: The Story of the Ramones (himself)
- 2004: Ramones: Raw (himself)
- 2010: Lemmy (himself)
- 2017: Uncle Grandpa Voice Role (himself)
- 2017: Unearthed & Untold: The Path to Pet Sematary (Documentary film, himself)

== Awards ==
- Ramone's hand prints are on Hollywood's RockWalk.
- In March 2002, Ramone was inducted to the Rock and Roll Hall of Fame at New York's Waldorf Astoria as a Ramone.
- Marky Ramone is the only living Ramone who won the lifetime achievement award from the Grammy Awards for 2011.

== Cited works ==
- Melnick, Monte (2007). On the Road With the Ramones. London: Bobcat Books. ISBN 978-0-85712-223-0.
- Ramone, Marky; Herschlag, Richard (2015). Punk Rock Blitzkrieg: My Life as a Ramone. New York City: Touchstone. ISBN 978-1-4516-8775-0.
- Antonia, Nina (1998). Too Much Too Soon: The New York Dolls. London: Omnibus Press. ISBN 0711967776.
