= Your Love Is Driving Me Crazy =

- Side A of the US single

Single by Sammy Hagar

from the album Three Lock Box
- B-side: "I Don't Need Love"
- Released: November 22, 1982
- Recorded: 1982
- Genre: Hard rock, pop metal
- Length: 3:30
- Label: Geffen
- Songwriter: Sammy Hagar
- Producer: Keith Olsen

Sammy Hagar singles chronology
"Piece of My Heart" (1982)	"Your Love Is Driving Me Crazy" (1982)	"Never Give Up" (1983)

"Your Love Is Driving Me Crazy" is a song written and performed by Sammy Hagar from his album Three Lock Box. It provided Hagar with his only top 20 solo hit on the Billboard Hot 100 chart, peaking at number 13 in 1983. The song reached number 19 in Canada.

"Your Love Is Driving Me Crazy" was ranked the 79th biggest U.S. hit of 1983 by Billboard magazine.

== Charts ==
=== Weekly charts ===
Chart (1983)	Peak position
Canada RPM 50 Singles	19
US Billboard Hot 100	13
US Mainstream Rock (Billboard)	3
US Cash Box Top 100 Singles	25

=== Year-end charts ===
Chart (1983)	Rank
US Billboard Top Pop Singles	79
