= Ramones: Raw =

Ramones: Raw is a DVD of the punk band Ramones. It consists of home video footage from Marky Ramone of the band's extensive touring and backstage footage along with live performances of their best-known songs.

Extras include a 1980 concert filmed in Rome, Italy. It also features the Ramones appearing in a partially ad-libbed skit from Channel 9's The Howard Stern Show and clips from The Uncle Floyd Show.

The commentary to the DVD features Marky Ramone, Johnny Ramone and director John Cafiero together discussing various scenes from the movie.

== Certifications ==
Region	Certification	Certified units/sales
Australia (ARIA)	Gold	7,500^{^}
Spain (Promusicae)	Gold	10,000^{^}
United States (RIAA)	Gold	50,000^{^}
^{^} Shipments figures based on certification alone.
