= Who's your daddy? =

Slang expression

Who's your daddy? is an American slang expression that, in one use, takes the form of a rhetorical question. It is commonly used as a boastful claim of dominance over the intended listener. It may also be a part of role play between intimate partners or as a claim of sexual dominance.

According to the Historical Dictionary of American Slang, the phrase dates back to 1681, when sex workers would use it to ask each other who their procurer was. Its modern popularity has been attributed to its frequent use in sexually suggestive skits broadcast in the 1980s by radio shock jock Doug Tracht; Tracht states he heard the term in the 1968 song "Time of the Season" by The Zombies in a non-sexual manner ("What's your name? Who's your daddy? Is he rich like me?") and "converted it to have a spicy connotation". The phrase is used in countless films and televisions shows, and is also used as a title for various forms of media including video games and songs.
