= Marching to Mars =

Studio album by Sammy Hagar
- Released: May 20, 1997
- Recorded: 1996–1997
- Genre: Hard rock
- Length: 50:58
- Label: MCA
- Producer: Mike Clink

Sammy Hagar chronology
Balance (1995)	Marching to Mars (1997)	Red Voodoo (1999)

Professional ratings
Review scores
Source	Rating
AllMusic	4/5 stars
Entertainment Weekly	B−

Marching to Mars is the tenth studio album by American rock singer Sammy Hagar, and his first post-Van Halen solo album. It features various musicians on different songs. It was released on May 20, 1997, by MCA Records. "Little White Lie" was a major mainstream rock hit, topping the mainstream rock tracks chart for five weeks.

== Song information ==
- Hagar had the idea for "Little White Lie" while still a member of Van Halen. The song was originally intended to be about racism, until Hagar saw Eddie and Alex Van Halen talking trash about him on MTV. At which point, Hagar rewrote the song to be about his former bandmates.
- "Leaving the Warmth of the Womb" amounted to a Montrose reunion. The sessions also had a rerecording of the Montrose classic, "Rock Candy", which can be found on the CD single release of "Little White Lie".
- "Kama" is described by Hagar as the Sanskrit translation of "love". It was written for his daughter, whom he had given the word as a name.
- Written while Hagar was still in Van Halen, "Amnesty Is Granted" was previously recorded by Meat Loaf for his album Welcome to the Neighborhood. Hagar played guitar and sang backing vocals on that version. According to Hagar's autobiography, he wrote the song about being able to be with his newfound love away from his ex-wife Betsy.
- "Salvation on Sand Hill" is co-written by Brother Cane's vocalist/lyricist/guitarist Damon Johnson who says, "...Sammy was inspired to write those lyrics after I showed him a book I had been reading: Salvation on Sand Mountain, which is about the worship rituals of some churches in Northeast Alabama..."

== Track listing ==
No.	Title	Writer(s)	Length
1.	"Little White Lie"	Sammy Hagar	2:54
2.	"Salvation on Sand Hill"	Hagar, Damon Johnson	5:01
3.	"Who Has the Right?"	Craig Chaquico, Hagar, Jesse Harms	5:20
4.	"Would You Do It for Free?"	Hagar, Harms	4:30
5.	"Leaving the Warmth of the Womb"	Hagar	5:06
6.	"Kama" (featuring Matt Sorum)	Hagar, Harms	5:20
7.	"On the Other Hand"	Hagar	2:42
8.	"Both Sides Now"	Hagar, Harms	4:27
9.	"The Yogi's So High (I'm Stoned)"	Hagar	6:02
10.	"Amnesty Is Granted"	Hagar	4:23
11.	"Marching to Mars"	Hagar, Mickey Hart	5:09

Japanese release bonus tracks
No.	Title	Writer(s)	Length
12.	"Ether"	Hagar, Harms	1:09
13.	"Wash Me Down Again"	Hagar, Harms	6:05

== Singles ==
- "Little White Lie" US (Track Factory TRK5P-3964)
- "Little White Lie" b/w "Rock Candy" Japan (MCA Victor MVCE-9002)
- "Little White Lie" b/w "Rock Candy" b/w "Ether" Europe (Track Factory TRD 49036)
- "Both Sides Now" (Radio Edit) b/w "Both Sides Now" (Album version) US (Track Factory TRK5P-90091)
- "Both Sides Now" (Radio Edit) US (GKS Entertainment 8125)
- "Marching To Mars" (Radio Edit) b/w "Marching To Mars" (Album version) US (Track Factory TRK5P-4011)
- "On The Other Hand" b/w "Right Now" (live) US (Track Factory TRK5P-4158)
- "Kama" (Radio Edit) b/w "Kama" (Album version) Asia (MCA TRK5P-4095)

== Personnel ==
All tracks were produced by Mike Clink, except for the title track, which was co-produced by Clink and Mickey Hart.

Little White Lie

- Lead vocals and guitar – Sammy Hagar
- Drums – Denny Carmassi
- Bass guitar – Jonathan Pierce
- Guitar – Slash
- Slide guitar and dobro – Roy Rogers
- Harmonica – Huey Lewis
- Percussion – Luis Conte, Mickey Hart, Giovanni Hidalgo

Salvation On Sand Hill

- Lead vocals and guitar – Sammy Hagar
- Drums – Denny Carmassi
- Bass guitar – Jonathan Pierce
- Rhythm and solo guitar – Damon Johnson
- Keyboards – Jesse Harms

Who Has The Right?

- Lead/background vocals and guitar – Sammy Hagar
- Drums – Denny Carmassi
- Bass guitar – Jonathan Pierce
- Keyboards – Jesse Harms
- Background vocals – Eric Martin, Mickey Thomas

Would You Do It For Free?

- Lead/background vocals and guitar – Sammy Hagar
- Drums – Denny Carmassi
- Bass guitar – Bootsy Collins
- Keyboards and background vocals – Jesse Harms

Leaving The Warmth of the Womb

- The original lineup of Montrose
- Lead vocals and guitar – Sammy Hagar
- Drums – Denny Carmassi
- Bass, vocals – Bill Church
- Acoustic, rhythm and solo guitar – Ronnie Montrose

Kama

- Lead/background vocals and guitar solo – Sammy Hagar
- Drums – Matt Sorum
- Bass guitar – Jonathan Pierce
- Guitars – Mike Landau
- Keyboards and background vocals – Jesse Harms
- Background vocals – Aaron Hagar, Mickey Thomas

On The Other Hand

- Lead/background vocals and acoustic/electric guitar – Sammy Hagar
- Drums – Denny Carmassi
- Bass guitar – Jonathan Pierce
- Acoustic and slide guitar – Damon Johnson
- Percussion – Mickey Hart, Giovanni Hidalgo

Both Sides Now

- Lead vocals and guitar – Sammy Hagar
- Drums – Denny Carmassi
- Bass guitar – Jonathan Pierce
- Keyboards and background vocals – Jesse Harms
- Percussion – Luis Conte, Mickey Hart, Giovanni Hidalgo

The Yogi's So High (I'm Stoned)

- Lead vocals and guitar – Sammy Hagar
- Drums – Denny Carmassi
- Bass guitar – Jonathan Pierce
- Keyboards and background vocals – Jesse Harms

Amnesty Is Granted

- Lead vocals and guitar – Sammy Hagar
- Drums – Denny Carmassi
- Bass guitar – Jonathan Pierce
- Keyboards – Jesse Harms

Marching To Mars

- Lead vocals, bass guitar and guitar – Sammy Hagar
- Drums – Denny Carmassi
- Sequencing and percussion – Mickey Hart
- Percussion – Giovanni Hidalgo
- Background vocals – Arnie's Army, Derrick Hawkins, Harley Di Nardo, Dave Cartategui, Kari Hagar

== Charts ==
Chart (1997)	Peak position
Canada Top Albums/CDs (RPM)	68
UK Rock & Metal Albums (Official Charts)	25
US Billboard 200	18

== Releases ==
- MCA Victor (Japan) : MVCE 240 10
- Track Factory (Europe) : TRD 11627
- Track Factory/MCA Records (Canada) : TRKSD 11627
