= Dee Jaywalker =

Belgian musician

Dee Jaywalker (1962-2024) was a Belgian musician and songwriter.

== Discography ==
=== With Organized Pleasure ===
- "Tropical Stumble" (1980)

=== With Definitivos ===
Dee Jaywalker himself played and wrote only the last 12' inch "Sightseeing - Bilateral Deals - Besse

- "Mister C"
- "Modern Dance"
- "All I Know"
- "Courtrai Tonight"
- "Sightseeing"
- "Bilateral deals"
- "Besse"

=== With Whydads ===
- That's why (1988)
- Harde Tijden (comp.) (1988)

=== With Marky Ramone and the SpeedKings ===
- "Ride Tonight" (2001)
- No Ifs Ands Or Buts (2001, White Jazz Records; 2002, JVC Records)
- Legends Bleed (2002, Thirsty Ear Records)
- Alive (2002, Rawk'A Hula)
- "I've Got Dee Dee On My Mind" (2002)
- "Rawk Over Scandinavia" (2002)
- "Love Hates Me" (2003)
- "Girls & Gasoline" (2003)
- "Good Cop Bad Cop/Sidewalkin" (September 2003)

=== With Greyhounddogs ===
- We're Getting Closer To The Grave Each Day: A Tribute To Hank Williams performing "Lost Highway" (2004)

=== Solo ===
- 59 O'Clock (2006, Nicotine Records)

=== With Walter Lure ===
- Walter Lure Live in Berlin (2008, Nicotine Records)

== Sources ==
- Nicotine Records
- About Dee Jaywalker, Ramones Website
- French show review
- Italian Article
- French article on the official Mouscron website
- Definitivos
- Definitivos on Bloody Belgium
- Definitivos on Bloodstains Across
- Short Bio of Dee Jaywalker on this SpeedKings article
- NYRock review of the Speedkings album
- Interview with Dee Jaywalker for SideWalkin'
- German article about the SpeedKings
- SpeedKings on Ragazzi Music
- Faroutski Official Site
- New York Waste
- Loud Fast Rules Magazine
