= I Never Said Goodbye =

Studio album by Sammy Hagar
- Released: June 23, 1987
- Recorded: 1987
- Studios: A&M Studios and One on One Recording Studios, Los Angeles, The Record Plant, Sausalito, California
- Genre: Glam metal
- Length: 45:33
- Label: Geffen
- Producers: Sammy Hagar, Edward Van Halen, David Thoener

Sammy Hagar chronology
5150 (1986)	I Never Said Goodbye (1987)	OU812 (1988)

Singles from I Never Said Goodbye
- 1. "Give to Live" Released: June 1987 (US); 2. "Eagles Fly" Released: October 1987

Professional ratings
Review scores
Source	Rating
Allmusic	2/5 stars
Crash	5–6/6
Kerrang!	4/5 stars

I Never Said Goodbye is the ninth studio album by American rock musician Sammy Hagar. The album was released on June 23, 1987 by Geffen Records. Released while Hagar was a member of Van Halen, I Never Said Goodbye was Hagar's first solo album since 1984's VOA. The album was recorded in ten days under a contractual obligation to Geffen Records as a condition of his leaving the company to join Van Halen and their record label, Warner Bros. Records. The album spent 23 weeks on the Billboard 200 chart and became Hagar's highest charting solo album, peaking at number 14 on August 15, 1987.

Hagar originally considered releasing it as another self-titled album with a textless cover. It was renamed I Never Said Goodbye after the new name was chosen as part of an MTV promotional contest. Some pressings retain the title Sammy Hagar, not to be confused with the 1977 album Sammy Hagar.

The album features Eddie Van Halen on bass guitar. The songs "Give to Live" and "Eagles Fly" were also performed live by Van Halen together with Hagar. "Give to Live" topped the Mainstream Rock Tracks chart in 1987, becoming Hagar's first song to reach number one on that chart.

== Song information ==
- "Returning Home" was intended to be a sequel to "Silver Lights" from Hagar's first album Nine on a Ten Scale. Whereas "Silver Lights" was a story about aliens taking humans from Earth, "Returning Home" tells the story of the humans' return trip. Hagar said that it could also apply to a tale that his future self might tell a child at that time.
- "Standin' at the Same Old Crossroads" was released in an extended version on the "Give to Live" single.
- "Privacy" was inspired by several run-ins that Hagar had with the California Highway Patrol while driving in his car with black-tinted windows. While court challenges would always be resolved in Hagar's favor, the law could not prevent the police from repeatedly pulling him over and giving him tickets.
- "Eagles Fly" was demoed with three other songs as a follow-up to Hagar's VOA album before joining Van Halen. When they had almost finished recording 5150 and "Dreams" had not yet been written, 5150's producer, Mick Jones, suggested that the band needed another song. Hagar presented "Eagles Fly" to the band acoustically, which was rejected as being too folksy. The band later joined Hagar performing the song live on their 1993 and 1995 tours. The song's lyrics deal with the level of consciousness immediately after birth, where humans are aware of all that is and all that was.

== Track listing ==
All tracks are written by Sammy Hagar, except where noted.

Side one
No.	Title	Length
1.	"When the Hammer Falls"	4:09
2.	"Hands and Knees"	4:52
3.	"Give to Live"	4:23
4.	"Boys' Night Out"	3:19
5.	"Returning Home"	6:17

Side two
No.	Title	Writer(s)	Length
6.	"Standin' at the Same Old Crossroads"		1:46
7.	"Privacy"		5:23
8.	"Back into You"	Hagar; Jesse Harms	5:15
9.	"Eagles Fly"		5:00
10.	"What They Gonna Say Now"		5:09
Total length:			45:33

== Personnel ==
- Sammy Hagar – lead vocals, all guitars
- Eddie Van Halen – bass, backing vocals, guitar solo on "Eagles Fly"
- Jesse Harms – keyboards, backing vocals
- David Lauser – drums, backing vocals

Additional musicians

- Albhy Galuten – additional keyboards and percussion
- Omar Hakim – drum overdubs on tracks "Hands and Knees" & "Back into You"

Production

- David Thoener – engineer, co-producer
- Rob Beaton, Cary Butler, Robert DelaGarza, Marc DeSisto, Mark McKenna, Toby Wright – assistant engineers
- Greg Fulginiti – mastering at Artisan Sound Recorders

== Charts ==
Chart (1987)	Peak position
Canada Top Albums/CDs (RPM)	48
German Albums (Offizielle Top 100)	56
Swedish Albums (Sverigetopplistan)	37
UK Albums (Official Charts)	86
US Billboard 200	14

== Certifications ==
Region	Certification	Certified units/sales
United States (RIAA)	Gold	500,000^{^}
^{^} Shipments figures based on certification alone.
