= The Jaywalks =

Australian indie rock band

The Jaywalks (formerly known as 'Who's Ya Daddy') were an indie rock Australian band. In 2004, they were recognized by Guinness World Records for being the youngest group of musicians banned from commercial radio airplay for their song "I Like Fat Chicks". It was banned on 23 December 2004 by ZZZ FM. At the time of the ban being announced, the average age of the three piece (later four piece) group was 12 years and 26 days. Ironically the banned song won a Dolphin Award for Best Pop Song in 2006. In 2008 the band released their debut EP, containing a re-recording of the notorious song and other newer material. The band broke up in 2011.
