= I Can't Drive 55 =

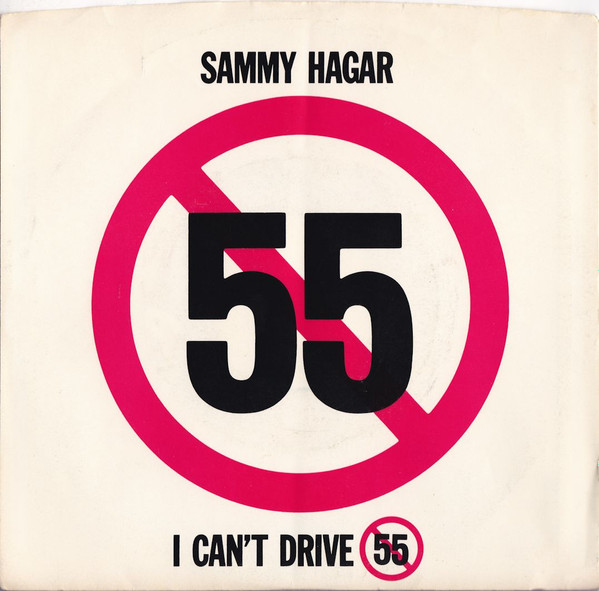

Single by Sammy Hagar

from the album VOA
- B-side: "Dick in the Dirt"
- Released: 1984
- Recorded: 1984
- Genre: Hard rock
- Length: 4:12
- Label: Geffen
- Songwriter: Sammy Hagar
- Producer: Ted Templeman

Sammy Hagar singles chronology
"Two Sides of Love" (1984)	"I Can't Drive 55" (1984)	"VOA" (1984)

"I Can't Drive 55" is the lead single and first track from Sammy Hagar's eighth studio album VOA in 1984. Perpetuated by a very successful music video, it became a concert staple that continued throughout Hagar's tours as a member of Van Halen. The song is a reference to the since-repealed National Maximum Speed Law that set speed limits at 55 miles per hour (89 km/h) in the United States.

It is the 100th song on VH1's 100 Greatest Hard Rock Songs.

== Song origin ==
Hagar wrote the song in response to receiving a speeding ticket in New York State outside Albany, for driving 62 mph (100 km/h) on the Northway, which at that location had a 55 mph (89 km/h) speed limit, the highest permissible speed limit in the United States at the time due to the National Maximum Speed Law enacted in 1974. Hagar explained in an interview:

Two o'clock in the morning, I'm driving a rental car to Albany, from Albany to Lake Placid. Four-lane Highway, not a soul, I'm going about 62 miles an hour exactly. Cop pulls me, a little wet I didn't even know while I was going the speed limit changed. I'm sitting there, I was so burnt, I was just exhausted. I just handed my driver's license, hand him the Rent-A-Car stuff. He starts to write it up and the guy said how fast is 62. I said like 'I thought it was 65', you know, and he's going [...] 'We give tickets around here for 62!'. You know like 'Where have you been?'. I went 55, get to my house, wrote the song. Oh man, I mean, four o'clock in the morning. I picked up my guitar. I just wrote that damn song. It came that quick.

Hagar has expressed interest in meeting the trooper who issued the ticket.

== Music video ==
The song's music video was directed by Gil Bettman. The video was shot on location at the Saugus Speedway in Santa Clarita, California.

The song's video includes Hagar and his band being chased and jailed by the California Highway Patrol for traffic violations. The video shows Hagar driving a black Ferrari 512 BBi which is later tuned up by Hagar's mechanic, Claudio Zampolli. Zampolli was driving the Ferrari during the video's opening shot, where the Ferrari fish-tails across the speedway. Hagar claims in the commentary for the video on the DVD, The Long Road to Cabo that he burned out his clutch during the video. Hagar drove a 512, but a 308 was also used. Hagar claims it cost him $5800 to fix.

A trial scene is presided over by a judge played in a cameo appearance by John Kalodner. The judge's props were borrowed from director Robert Zemeckis, director of the 1980 film Used Cars. Sets were built and the video was shot during the summer. There was no air conditioning in the jailhouse set, so the cast and crew were hot.

The yellow jumpsuit, worn by Hagar in the video, can be seen at the New Orleans Hard Rock Cafe. A stuntman was used for Hagar's stunts. An exploding ramp was used to throw Hagar across the courtroom.

== Track listing ==
1. "I Can't Drive 55" (Sammy Hagar) – 4:12
2. "Dick in the Dirt" (Sammy Hagar) – 4:19

== Personnel ==
- Sammy Hagar – lead vocals, lead guitar
- Gary Pihl – rhythm guitar, backing vocals
- Jesse Harms – keyboards, backing vocals
- Bill Church – bass guitar, backing vocals
- David Lauser – drums, backing vocals

== Chart performance ==
Chart (1984–85)	Peak position
US Billboard Hot 100	26
US Top Rock Tracks	9

== Additional placements ==
- The song was featured in a 2007 NAPA Auto Parts commercial, which featured NASCAR drivers Michael Waltrip and teammate Dale Jarrett asking Hagar to keep the noise down during a recording session. In response, Hagar asked Waltrip if he could drive faster. Waltrip's car number, at the time of the commercial, was No. 55, and he had failed to qualify for some races.
- In 2021, Sammy Hagar performed this song live at the NASCAR All-Star Race at Texas Motor Speedway during the warmup lap before the race began.
