= VOA (album) =

Studio album by Sammy Hagar
- Released: July 23, 1984
- Studios: Fantasy, Berkeley, California; Sunset Sound, Hollywood
- Genre: Hard rock
- Length: 36:24
- Label: Geffen
- Producer: Ted Templeman

Sammy Hagar chronology
Through the Fire (1984)	VOA (1984)	I Never Said Goodbye (1987)

VOA is the eighth studio album by American rock musician Sammy Hagar, released on July 23, 1984, by Geffen Records. It was Hagar's last solo album before joining Van Halen. The title is a reference to the Voice of America broadcast network. The album peaked at number 32 on the Billboard 200 album charts on December 15, 1984, and features the single "I Can't Drive 55", Hagar's most successful song as a solo artist.

== Background and recording ==
The album was recorded at Fantasy Studios in Berkeley, California and Sunset Sound in Hollywood, and then mixed at The Power Station in New York.

According to the album's liner notes, "Burnin' Down the City" is inspired by the street artists of New York City.

Professional ratings
Review scores
Source	Rating
Allmusic	link

== Track listing ==
All tracks are written by Sammy Hagar, except where noted.

No.	Title	Length
1.	"I Can't Drive 55"	4:12
2.	"Swept Away"	5:36
3.	"Rock Is in My Blood"	4:29
4.	"Two Sides of Love"	3:41

Side two
No.	Title	Writer(s)	Length
5.	"Dick in the Dirt"		4:19
6.	"VOA"		4:29
7.	"Don't Make Me Wait"	Hagar; Jesse Harms	4:06
8.	"Burnin' Down the City"		5:32
Total length:			36:24

== Personnel ==
- Sammy Hagar – lead vocals, lead guitar
- Gary Pihl – rhythm guitar, backing vocals
- Jesse Harms – keyboards, backing vocals
- Bill Church – bass guitar, backing vocals
- David Lauser – drums, backing vocals
- Ted "Champagne" Templeman – percussion

=== Production ===
- Ted Templeman – producer
- Jeff Hendrickson – engineer
- Tom Size – assistant engineer
- Gary Rindfuss – assistant engineer
- Eric Mohler – assistant engineer
- Terry Christian – assistant engineer

== Charts ==
Chart (1984)	Peak position
Canada Top Albums/CDs (RPM)	93
US Billboard 200	32

== Certifications ==
Region	Certification	Certified units/sales
United States (RIAA)	Platinum	1,000,000^{^}
^{^} Shipments figures based on certification alone.
