= Who's Your Daddy? (2005 TV series) =

2005 reality television special

- Genre: Reality television
- Presented by: Finola Hughes
- Country of origin: United States
- Original language: English
- No. of seasons: 1
- No. of episodes: 6

Production
- Executive producers: Scott Hallock; Kevin Healey; Ken Mok
- Production location: Thousand Oaks, California
- Running time: 90 minutes
- Production companies: 10 by 10 Entertainment; Hallock-Healey Entertainment; Fox Television Studios

Original release
- Network: Fox (pilot); Fox Reality Channel
- Release: January 3 – June 19, 2005

Who's Your Daddy? is an American reality television special broadcast by the Fox Broadcasting Company (Fox). The 90 minute special premiered on January 3, 2005, and starred actress T. J. Myers. The special depicted eight men in competition for a $100,000 reward over who could best convince Myers, a woman who was adopted, that they were her biological father. One of the contestants, however, actually was Myers's biological father. Myers had the opportunity to interview and observe each contestant before making a determination on which man was her biological father. If Myers incorrectly selected a contestant as her biological father, the contestant won the reward. Conversely, if she correctly determined which contestant was her biological father, Myers won the reward. The special was hosted by English actress Finola Hughes.

The special was intended to serve as a pilot for a six-episode season, although Fox shelved the remaining episodes following the special's modest ratings. The following five episodes were later aired on Fox Reality Channel.

== Format ==
The special's premise was that an adult who had been put up for adoption as an infant was placed in a room with eight men, one of whom was their biological father. If the contestant could correctly pick out who was their father, the contestant would win $100,000. If they chose incorrectly, the person that they incorrectly selected would get the $100,000, although the contestant would still be reunited with their father. The first adoption contestant was actress T. J. Myers. United Press International reported that Myers "guessed which of eight men was her father. She guessed correctly and won $100,000."

== Background ==
According to Myers, when she first new about the show and the whole time they were filming it, the original working title was going to be called "Reunited".

On December 13, 2004, Fox sent out a press release for Who's Your Daddy? Set to air on January 3, 2005, the release described the special as a "dramatic and emotional" program.

Prior to the special's premiere, Fox ordered seven additional episodes.

== Reception ==
Who's Your Daddy? garnered mixed reception from television critics. The special resulted in a grassroots campaign among adoptive parents and protests from national adoption organizations. WRAZ, a Fox affiliate in Raleigh, North Carolina, refused to broadcast the special; rather, the affiliate opted to air a documentary film about adoptive families titled I Have Roots and Branches: Personal Reflections on Adoption. Who's Your Daddy? garnered further controversy when, one day after the special's premiere, Gawker reported that Myers had previously appeared in the 1995 softcore pornography film Seduction of Innocence.

Paul Farhi of The Washington Post referred to Who's Your Daddy? as a "new-low-in-reality-television 'special'", in which he directed his criticisms at the special's title. Alessandra Stanley of The New York Times claimed that despite the special's "provocative title, [Who's Your Daddy?] turned out to be fairly bland and hokey -- a daytime soap opera shown at night." Writing for Salon, Louis Bayard commentated that the series was "too panderingly stupid to get seriously upset about", but "when it comes to deciding what a family is, it may be wise to look to sources outside of Fox." Bayard also noted that he had a four-year-old adopted son from Vietnam.

=== Ratings ===
The special premiered to 6.3 million viewers, in which it was fourth in its time slot according to Nielsen Media Research. The special had a 2.3/6 rating among adults 18-49.

== Cancellation ==
After the pilot finished fourth in the Nielsen ratings for its time slot, Fox decided not to broadcast the other five episodes that had been produced. However, the pilot aired as a 'special' and not as a 'series premiere'. The remaining episodes eventually aired on Fox Reality Channel during Father's Day 2005. They were all filmed before January 2005.

== Who's Your Mommy? ==
A forgotten spinoff series called Who's Your Mommy?, also hosted by Hughes, had a similar premise and payout as Who's Your Daddy? except that eight women are presented to a young woman who must find their real life biological birthmother in order to win $100,000. Two episodes that featured two women named "Alexis" and "Jenna" aired on Fox Reality Channel in the same day on November 25, 2005.

== Avalibility ==
Both Who's Your Daddy? amd Who's Your Mommy? can be seen and viewed on YouTube.
