= Three Lock Box =

Studio album by Sammy Hagar
- Released: December 6, 1982
- Recorded: 1982
- Studio: Goodnight LA (Los Angeles)
- Genre: Hard rock
- Length: 39:10
- Label: Geffen
- Producer: Keith Olsen

Sammy Hagar chronology
Standing Hampton (1982)	Three Lock Box (1982)	Live 1980 (1983)

Singles from Three Lock Box
- 1. "Your Love Is Driving Me Crazy" Released: 1982; 2. "Remember the Heroes" Released: 1983; 3. "I Don't Need Love" Released: 1983; 4. "Never Give Up" Released: 1983

Professional ratings
Review scores
Source	Rating
AllMusic	4.5/5 stars

Three Lock Box is the seventh studio album by the American rock vocalist Sammy Hagar, released on December 6, 1982 by Geffen Records. This album has appearances by Loverboy's Mike Reno, Journey's Jonathan Cain and Mr. Mister's Richard Page. It peaked at number 17 on the Billboard 200 album charts on April 9, 1983. His only top 20 solo hit, "Your Love Is Driving Me Crazy", reached #13 on the Billboard Hot 100 in 1983 and #3 on the Billboard Mainstream Rock songs chart.

== Song information ==
The lyrics to the title track presented a story with a more philosophical bent: "It's got to do with deep sea diving, when you look for a buried treasure. The ultimate treasure would be a sunken treasure with three locks on it, because that means it was the most valuable stuff that the queen had on that ship. And you need three different guys with keys to open it, that way no one could steal it. So a 'Three Lock Box' to me is within yourself. If you unlock the treasure of your physical, and your mental and your spiritual potential - those three in balance - you are a real human being and almost godly."

Elsewhere, Hagar said, "The three lock box can also be a woman's body. The cover of the LP shows the lips, which is one of the locks, and the others I think you can figure out for yourself."

== Reception ==
Kerrang! said, "It's an experimental album that has failed overall, an interesting exploration which doesn't improve on tried and tested formulas. It grows on you the more you listen to it, but is that just familiarity breeding acceptability?"

== Track listing ==
All tracks are written by Sammy Hagar, except where noted.

Side one
No.	Title	Writer(s)	Length
1.	"Three Lock Box"		3:22
2.	"Remote Love"		3:54
3.	"Remember the Heroes"	Jonathan Cain; Hagar	5:58
4.	"Your Love Is Driving Me Crazy"		3:30
5.	"In the Room"		3:42

Side two
No.	Title	Writer(s)	Length
6.	"Rise of the Animal"		5:30
7.	"I Wouldn't Change a Thing"		3:19
8.	"Growing Up"		3:16
9.	"Never Give Up"	Keith Olsen; Alan Pasqua	3:14
10.	"I Don't Need Love"	Bill Church; Hagar; David Lauser; Gary Pihl	3:08
Total length:			39:10

== Personnel ==
=== Band ===
- Sammy Hagar – lead vocals, guitar
- Gary Pihl – guitar
- Bill Church – bass
- David Lauser – drums

=== Guests ===
- Jonathan Cain – keyboards and backing vocals on "Remember the Heroes"
- Mike Reno – vocals on "Remember the Heroes"

=== Additional personnel ===
- Alan Pasqua – keyboards
- Patrick Gleason – sound effects
- Richard Page – additional backing vocals
- Tom Kelly – additional backing vocals
- Greg Fulginiti - mastering

== Singles ==
- "Your Love Is Driving Me Crazy" b/w "I Don't Need Love" - US (Geffen 7-29816)
- "Your Love Is Driving Me Crazy" b/w "I Don't Need Love" - Spain (Geffen GEF A-3043)
- "Your Love Is Driving Me Crazy" b/w "I Don't Need Love" - Holland (Geffen A-3043)
- "Your Love Is Driving Me Crazy" b/w "I Don't Need Love" - US (Geffen PRO-A-1086)
- "Never Give Up" b/w "Fast Times At Ridgemont High" - US (Geffen 7-29718)
- "Never Give Up" b/w "Rise of the Animal"/"Three Lock Box" - US (Geffen PRO-A-2008)

== Releases ==
- Geffen Records (US LP): GHS 2021
- Geffen Records (Japan): 25AP 2485
- Geffen Records (Holland): GEF 25254
- Geffen Records (US CD): 2021-1
- MCA Victor (Japan): MVCG-21005

== Charts ==
=== Weekly charts ===
Chart (1982–83)	Peak position
US Billboard 200	17

=== Year-end charts ===
Chart (1983)	Position
US Billboard 200	46

== Certifications ==
Region	Certification	Certified units/sales
United States (RIAA)	Gold	500,000^{^}
^{^} Shipments figures based on certification alone.
