= At Your Service (The Circle album) =

Live album by Sammy Hagar and the Circle
- Released: 19 May 2015
- Recorded: 2014
- Genre: Hard rock; heavy metal; blues rock
- Label: Mailboat
- Producer: Jaimeson Durr; Sammy Hagar; Vic Johnson

Sammy Hagar and the Circle chronology
At Your Service (2015)	Space Between (2019)

Sammy Hagar chronology
Lite Roast (2014)	At Your Service (2015)	This Is Sammy Hagar: When the Party Started Vol. 1 (2016)

Professional ratings
Review scores
Source	Rating
MelodicRock	89/100

At Your Service is the debut live album by hard rock supergroup Sammy Hagar and the Circle, released on May 19, 2015. It includes music originally recorded by Montrose, Van Halen, Sammy Hagar and The Waboritas, and Led Zeppelin.

A live DVD of this album was released in December 2015. It includes all tracks except for the solos.

== Track listing ==
Disc one
No.	Title	Original album (year)	Length
1.	"There's Only One Way to Rock"	Standing Hampton (1982)	5:45
2.	"Rock Candy"	Montrose (1973)	5:54
3.	"Good Times Bad Times"	Led Zeppelin (1969)	3:26
4.	"Poundcake"	For Unlawful Carnal Knowledge (1991)	5:57
5.	"I Can't Drive 55"	VOA (1984)	5:08
6.	"Mikey Bass Solo"		3:19
7.	"When It's Love"	OU812 (1988)	5:45
8.	"Whole Lotta Love"	Led Zeppelin II (1969)	6:23
9.	"Little White Lie"	Marching to Mars (1997)	4:17
10.	"When the Levee Breaks"	Led Zeppelin IV (1971)	8:03

Disc two
No.	Title	Original album (year)	Length
1.	"Jason Drum Solo" / "Moby Dick"	Led Zeppelin II (1969)	3:53
2.	"Why Can't This Be Love"	5150 (1986)	4:03
3.	"Finish What Ya Started"	OU812 (1988)	4:52
4.	"Heavy Metal"	Standing Hampton (1982)	4:39
5.	"Vic Guitar Solo"		1:24
6.	"Best of Both Worlds"	5150 (1986)	7:03
7.	"Right Now"	For Unlawful Carnal Knowledge (1991)	6:03
8.	"Rock and Roll"	Led Zeppelin IV (1971)	4:37
9.	"Dreams"	5150 (1986)	5:08

== Personnel ==
Sammy Hagar and the Circle

- Michael Anthony – bass, backing vocals
- Jason Bonham – drums
- Sammy Hagar – lead vocals, guitar
- Vic Johnson – guitar, backing vocals

Production

- Paul Binder – production manager
- Stephen "Three" Edgerly – drum tech
- Jim "Rosie" Greenawalt – lighting designer
- Jim Jorgensen – monitor engineer
- Kenny "Flounder" Mason – lighting crew chief
- Gary Notley – production assistant

== Charts ==
Chart (2015)	Peak position
US Billboard 200	78
US Billboard Rock Chart	12
US Billboard Top Album Sales	37
