= Summer Tour 2009 (Chickenfoot) =

2009 concert tour by Chickenfoot

- Tour by Chickenfoot
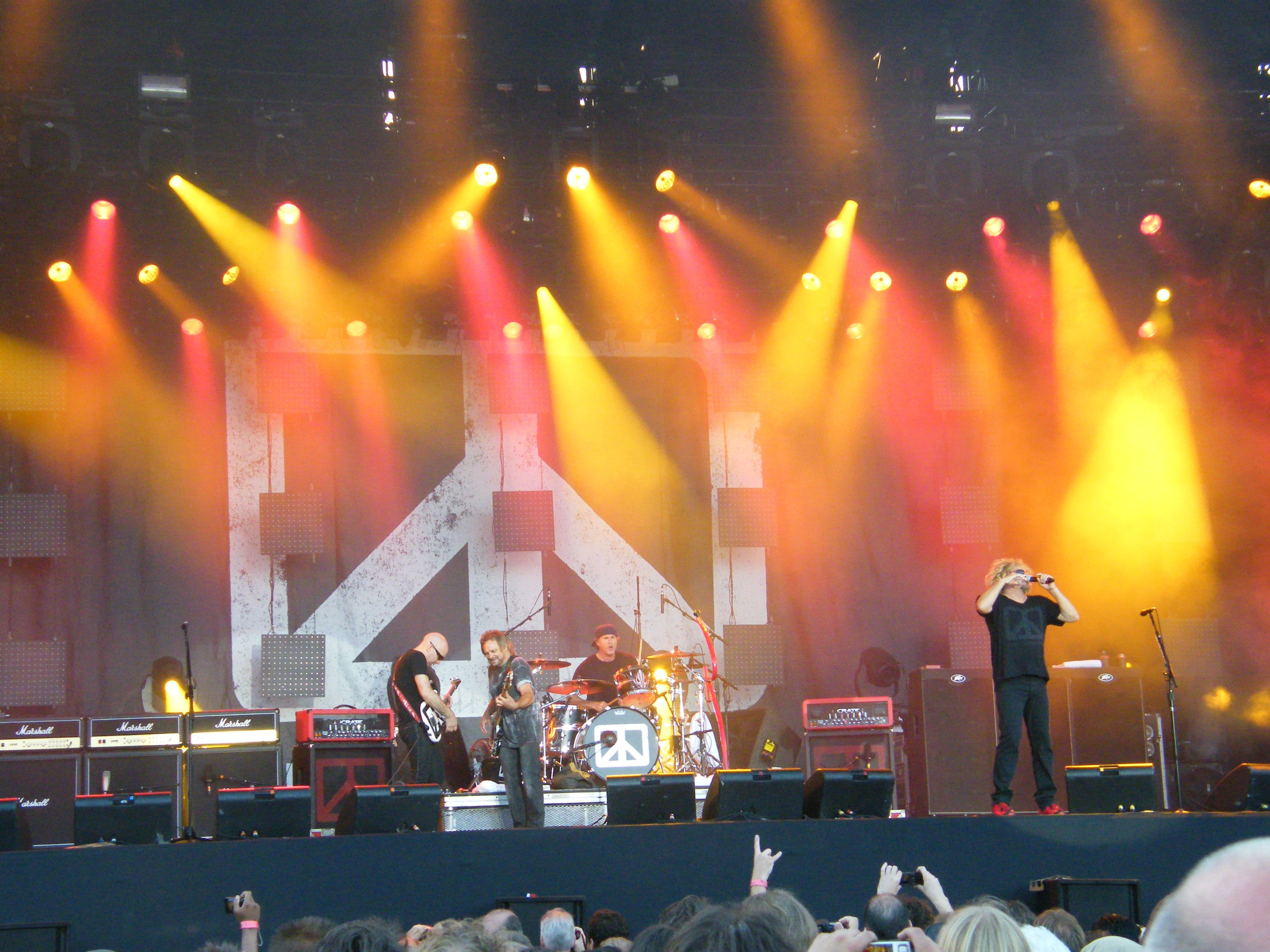
- The band during the Bospop Festival.
- Associated album: Chickenfoot
- Start date: June 20, 2009
- End date: December 5, 2009
- No. of shows: Total: 45: Europe: 11; North America: 34

Chickenfoot concert chronology
- Road Test Tour (2009); Summer Tour 2009 (2009); Road Test Tour (2011)

The Chickenfoot Summer Tour 2009 (also known as the Summer Tour 2009) was a worldwide concert tour by the American supergroup Chickenfoot featuring guitarist Joe Satriani, former Van Halen members singer Sammy Hagar and bassist Michael Anthony as well as Red Hot Chili Peppers drummer Chad Smith. The tour took place to promote their debut studio album Chickenfoot, released in 2009. The Rock band played a series of concerts in both North America and Europe spanning from June until December 2009. It followed the sell-out Road Test Tour which took place in spring of 2009.

== Background ==
Before going on an international world tour in 2009, the band organized a series of shows in the United States to seak critical acclaim and reaction of their fans. These nine dates which took place in the spring of 2009 were titled as the Chickenfoot Road Test Tour 2009. As the tour was quickly sold out, the band shared in a press release on April 21, 2009: "The band was blown away by your response and can't wait to take the show on the road. Chickenfoot will be back […]". On June 5, 2009, Chickenfoot promoted both the upcoming album as well as the summer tour on the program Tonight Show with Conan O'Brien.

On November 6, 2009, the band promoted their final concerts on the show Jimmy Kimmel Live!. Ultimately, the Chickenfoot Summer Tour 2009 was announced on June 3, 2009. The tour started with a total of 14 planned shows in Europe before the tour would be concluded in North America with two shows in Canada, 31 shows in the United States as well as one show in Mexico. In Europe, the band played in Austria, Ireland, England, the Netherlands, Italy, Belgium, France, Sweden and Switzerland. However, some of the shows were cancelled (see notes).

== Set list ==
This set list is representative of the show on 23 September 2009.

1. "Avenida Revolucion"
2. "Sexy Little Thing"
3. "Soap on a Rope"
4. "My Kinda Girl"
5. "Down the Drain"
6. "Bitten By The Wolf"
7. "Oh Yeah"
8. "Learning to Fall"
9. "Get It Up"
10. "Turnin' Left"
11. "Future in the Past"
12. "Bad Motor Scooter"
13. "My Generation"

== Tour dates ==
List of concerts, showing date, city, country and venue
Date	City	Country	Venue
Europe
20 June 2009	Nickelsdorf	Austria	Nova Rock Festival
23 June 2009	Cork	Ireland	Live at the Marquee
25 June 2009	London	England	Shepherd's Bush Empire
26 June 2009	Heerhugowaard	Netherlands	Waerdse Tempel
28 June 2009	Dessel	Belgium	Graspop Metal Meeting
29 June 2009	Paris	France	Olympia
~~2 July 2009~~ (Note: This show was cancelled due a serious injury to drummer Chad Smith.)	~~Madrid~~	~~Spain~~	~~Palacio de Deportes~~
3 July 2009	Pistoia	Italy	Blues Festival
4 July 2009	Montreux	Switzerland	Jazz Festival
5 July 2009	Udine	Italy	Riverside Beach
~~8 July 2009~~ (Note: This show was cancelled due a serious injury to drummer Chad Smith.)	~~Hamburg~~	~~Germany~~	~~Große Freiheit~~
~~9 July 2009~~ (Note: This show was cancelled due a serious injury to drummer Chad Smith.)	~~Copenhagen~~	~~Denmark~~	~~Vega Hall~~
10 July 2009	Kilafors	Sweden	Rockweekend Festival
12 July 2009	Weert	Netherlands	Bospop Festival
North America
2 August 2009	Halifax	Canada	Citadel Hill
~~4 August 2009~~ (Note: This show was cancelled due logistical reasons and rescheduled to August 5, 2009.)	~~Toronto~~	Canada	~~Sound Academy~~
~~5 August 2009~~ (Note: This show was cancelled due logistical reasons and was not rescheduled during this tour.)	~~Pittsburgh~~	~~United States~~	~~Riverplex Amphitheatre~~
5 August 2009	Toronto	Canada	Sound Academy
7 August 2009	Chicago	United States	The Theatre
8 August 2009	Detroit	United States	The Fillmore
11 August 2009	Kansas City	United States	Uptown Theatre
13 August 2009	Comstock Park	United States	Fifth Third Ballpark
15 August 2009	Cleveland	United States	Rock and Roll Hall of Fame
17 August 2009	New York City	United States	Beacon Theatre
18 August 2009	Baltimore	United States	Lyric Opera House
20 August 2009	Uncasville	United States	Mohegan Sun Arena
21 August 2009	Atlantic City	United States	Music Box
22 August 2009	Atlantic City	United States	House of Blues
23 August 2009	Hampton Beach	United States	Casino Ballroom
24 August 2009	Boston	United States	Bank of America Pavilion
26 August 2009	Portsmouth	United States	nTelos Pavilion
27 August 2009	Charlotte	United States	Uptown Amphitheatre
29 August 2009	North Myrtle Beach	United States	House of Blues
30 August 2009	Atlanta	United States	The Tabernacle
5 September 2009	Lake Tahoe	United States	Resort Hotel and Casino
11 September 2009	Denver	United States	The Fillmore
11 September 2009	Columbus	United States	Ohio State Fair
12 September 2009	Grand Junction	United States	Loudwire Music Festival
14 September 2009	Tulsa	United States	Brady Theater
16 September 2009	Houston	United States	Verizon Wireless Theater
17 September 2009	Corpus Christi	United States	Concrete Street Pavilion
18 September 2009	Austin	United States	Travis County Expo
20 September 2009	San Antonio	United States	Sunset Station
21 September 2009	Grand Prairie	United States	Nokia Theatre
23 September 2009	Phoenix	United States	Dodge Theatre
25 September 2009	Berkeley	United States	Greek Theatre
26 September 2009	Valley Center	United States	Open Sky Theater
27 September 2009	Universal City	United States	Gibson Amphitheater
10 October 2009	Cabo San Lucas	Mexico	Cabo Wabo Cantina
5 December 2009	Las Vegas	United States	The Joint
