= Top of the World (Van Halen song) =

1991 single by Van Halen

Single by Van Halen

from the album For Unlawful Carnal Knowledge
- B-side: "Poundcake" (North America only); "In 'n' Out" (Europe only)
- Released: September 1991
- Studio: 5150 (Studio City, California)
- Genre: Pop metal
- Length: 3:52
- Label: Warner Bros.
- Songwriters: Eddie Van Halen; Michael Anthony; Sammy Hagar; Alex Van Halen
- Producers: Andy Johns; Ted Templeman; Van Halen

Van Halen singles chronology
"Poundcake" (1991)	"Top of the World" (1991)	"Right Now" (1992)

Music videos
- "Top of the World" on YouTube

"Top of the World" is a pop metal song by the American rock band Van Halen from their ninth album, For Unlawful Carnal Knowledge. It was released as the second single from the album and spent four non-consecutive weeks at the top of the US Billboard Album Rock Tracks chart, becoming their eighth number 1 on this chart. It was the only single off the album to enter the Top 40 of the Billboard Hot 100, peaking at number 27. The main guitar riff from "Top of the World" is actually carried over from the closing guitar background riff from 1984's "Jump".

In Billboard’s industry reporting from the time of its release, “Top of the World” was highlighted as one of the most-added tracks at rock radio, reflecting strong initial support from programmers as the single was introduced to stations.

== History ==
This song was recorded in early 1991; however, the main riff for this song was first played live on the Van Halen 1979 World Tour during "Dance the Night Away". Eddie Van Halen recorded this song using his brand new Ernie Ball Music Man signature guitar and his new Peavey 5150 amps. The song includes Toto lead guitarist Steve Lukather on background vocals. It was the last song played during live shows on the For Unlawful Carnal Knowledge Tour, following "Jump". It was also played on the 1993 Right Here Right Now Tour, the 1995 Balance Tour, and the ill-fated 2004 reunion tour.

== Personnel ==
- Sammy Hagar – lead vocals
- Eddie Van Halen – guitar, backing vocals
- Michael Anthony – bass guitar, backing vocals
- Alex Van Halen – drums, percussion

=== Additional musicians ===
- Steve Lukather – backing vocals

== Charts ==
=== Weekly charts ===
Chart (1991)	Peak position
UK Singles (Official Charts)	63
US Billboard Hot 100	27
US Mainstream Rock (Billboard)	1

=== Year-end charts ===
Chart (1991)	Position
US Album Rock Tracks (Billboard)	9

== Release history ==
Region	Date	Format(s)	Label(s)	Ref.
United States	September 1991	7-inch vinyl; CD; cassette	Warner Bros.	
United Kingdom	October 7, 1991	7-inch vinyl; 12-inch box set; CD; cassette	Warner Bros.	
Australia	November 4, 1991	CD; cassette	Warner Bros.	
