= Feels So Good (Van Halen song) =

Single by Van Halen

from the album OU812
- B-side: "Sucker in a 3 Piece"
- Released: January 1989
- Genre: Pop rock
- Length: 4:27; 3:59 (single)
- Label: Warner Bros.
- Songwriters: Eddie Van Halen; Alex Van Halen; Sammy Hagar; Michael Anthony
- Producers: Van Halen; Donn Landee

Van Halen singles chronology
"Finish What Ya Started" (1988)	"Feels So Good" (1989)	"Poundcake" (1991)

"Feels So Good" is a song by American rock band Van Halen. It was released as the fourth and final single from the band's eighth studio album OU812 (1988) in January 1989. Like previous singles from the band, including "Jump", "I'll Wait" (both 1984), "Why Can't This Be Love" (1986), and "When It's Love" (1988), "Feels So Good" features a heavy emphasis on keyboards played by Eddie Van Halen. Upon its release, "Feels So Good" was a commercial success, becoming the fourth single in a row from OU812 to reach the top 40 in the US.

== Overview ==
Lead vocalist Sammy Hagar has described "Feels So Good" as being in a "pop Genesis style".

== Release ==
In the fall of 1988, before its release as a single, "Feels So Good" peaked at number 6 on the Billboard Album Rock Tracks chart. Once it had been released as a commercial single, it became the fourth straight top 40 hit from OU812, peaking at number 35. It also charted in the UK, where it peaked at number 63. Despite its success, it was never played live by the band.

== Charts ==
Chart (1989)	Peak position
UK Singles (OCC)	63
US Billboard Hot 100	35
US Billboard Album Rock Tracks	6
