= LV (album) =

Live album by Chickenfoot
- Released: December 7, 2012
- Recorded: Side A: May–June 2012, US; Side B:September 23, 2009, Phoenix, AZ
- Genre: Hard rock, heavy metal, blues rock
- Length: 56:51
- Label: eOne Music, earMUSIC

Chickenfoot chronology
Chickenfoot III (2011)	LV (2012)

Sammy Hagar chronology
Chickenfoot III (2011)	LV (2012)	Sammy Hagar & Friends (2013)

LV is the first live album by American hard rock band Chickenfoot. It was originally released as a bonus to a packaging of the first two Chickenfoot studio albums, and was eventually released on its own. The first "side" includes tracks from the 2012 "Different Devil" tour. "Side B" includes tracks from the band's first tour that were also included in the DVD release, "Get Your Buzz On".

It was included, with the band's two previous albums, in the box set, I + III + LV. Metal Hammer noted in its review of the box set that LV "really showcases why the band have established a reputation for being much more than just a vanity supergroup."

== Title ==
"LV" is a shorthand play on the word "live", but also plays into the album naming scheme adopted by Chickenfoot, using out-of-sequence roman numerals. LV happens to represent "55" as a Roman numeral, playing off of lead singer Hagar's biggest solo hit.

== Track listing ==
All tracks are written by Sammy Hagar and Joe Satriani, except where noted.

No.	Title	Recording	Length
1.	"Lighten Up"	May 12, 2012 in Chicago, IL	6:58
2.	"Big Foot"	June 6, 2012 in Seattle, WA	4:21
3.	"Last Temptation"	June 6, 2012 in Seattle, WA	4:09
4.	"Something Going Wrong"	May 16, 2012 in Boston, MA	6:42
5.	"Down The Drain"	September 23, 2009 in Phoenix, AZ	9:10
6.	"Oh Yeah"	September 23, 2009 in Phoenix, AZ	6:18
7.	"Turnin' Left"	September 23, 2009 in Phoenix, AZ	8:37
8.	"My Kinda Girl"	September 23, 2009 in Phoenix, AZ	4:37
9.	"Learning To Fall"	September 23, 2009 in Phoenix, AZ	5:58

== Personnel ==
Chickenfoot

- Sammy Hagar – lead vocals, rhythm guitar
- Joe Satriani – lead guitar, keyboards, piano
- Michael Anthony – bass guitar, backing vocals
- Chad Smith – drums, percussion on tracks 5–9
- Kenny Aronoff – drums, percussion on tracks 1–4
- Michael "Ace" Baker – recording
