= Lockdown 2020 =

2021 studio album by Sammy Hagar and the Circle

Studio album of cover songs by Sammy Hagar and the Circle
- Released: January 8, 2021
- Genre: Hard rock
- Label: Mailboat
- Producer: Sammy Hagar; Vic Johnson

Sammy Hagar and the Circle chronology
Space Between (2019)	Lockdown 2020 (2021)	Crazy Times (2022)

Sammy Hagar chronology
Space Between (2019)	Lockdown 2020 (2021)	Crazy Times (2022)

Lockdown 2020 is an album of covers by Sammy Hagar and the Circle. This album was recorded during the COVID-19 pandemic and was released on January 8, 2021. It includes covers of The Who's "Won't Get Fooled Again", Bob Marley's "Three Little Birds", AC/DC's "Whole Lotta Rosie" and David Bowie's "Heroes." the only original composition "Funky Feng Shui" was eventually rerecorded and released on 2022's Crazy Times album.

The band announced that all proceeds from their cover of "Heroes" will be donated to food banks nationwide.

== Track listing ==
Lockdown 2020 track listing
No.	Title	Original artist	Length
1.	"Funky Feng Shui" (Lockdown Version)	Sammy Hagar and The Circle	1:13
2.	"Won't Get Fooled Again"	The Who	2:08
3.	"Good Enough"	Van Halen	2:04
4.	"Three Little Birds"	Bob Marley	2:00
5.	"Whole Lotta Rosie"	AC/DC	2:30
6.	"For What It's Worth"	Buffalo Springfield	3:00
7.	"Keep A'Knockin'"	Little Richard	1:38
8.	"Right Now"	Van Halen	3:39
9.	"Don't Tell Me What Love Can Do"	Van Halen	2:54
10.	"Sympathy for the Human"	Sammy Hagar & The Wabos	2:41
11.	"Heroes"	David Bowie	3:07

== Personnel ==
Sammy Hagar and the Circle

- Michael Anthony – bass guitar, backing vocals
- Jason Bonham – drums, percussion, backing vocals
- Sammy Hagar – lead vocals, lead guitar, rhythm guitar
- Vic Johnson – guitar, backing vocals
