= Black and Blue (Van Halen song) =

Single by Van Halen

from the album OU812
- B-side: "A Apolitical Blues"
- Released: May 1988
- Recorded: 1987–1988
- Studio: 5150 Studios, Studio City, California
- Length: 5:26
- Label: Warner Bros.
- Songwriters: Eddie Van Halen; Alex Van Halen; Michael Anthony; Sammy Hagar
- Producers: Van Halen; Donn Landee

Van Halen singles chronology
| "Best of Both Worlds" (1986) | "Black and Blue" (1988) | "When It's Love" (1988) |

"Black and Blue" is a song by American rock band Van Halen, from their 1988 album OU812. It was the first single released from the album, peaking at number 34 on the Billboard Hot 100, and at number 1 on the Billboard Album Rock Tracks chart,

Cash Box called it a "power-rocker that nearly sizzles off the vinyl" and praised Sammy Hagar's singing and Eddie Van Halen's guitar playing.

== Personnel ==
- Michael Anthony – bass guitar, vocals
- Sammy Hagar – lead vocals
- Alex Van Halen – drums
- Eddie Van Halen – guitar

== Charts ==
=== Weekly charts ===
Weekly chart performance for "Black and Blue"
| Chart (1988) | Peak position |
|---|---|
| Canada Top Singles (RPM) | 42 |
| Canada (The Record) | 34 |
| US Billboard Hot 100 | 34 |
| US Billboard Mainstream Rock | 1 |
