= Space Between (album) =

Studio album by Sammy Hagar and the Circle
- Released: May 10, 2019
- Genre: Hard rock
- Length: 34:51
- Label: BMG
- Producer: Jaimeson Durr; Sammy Hagar; Vic Johnson

Sammy Hagar and the Circle chronology
At Your Service (2015)	Space Between (2019)	Lockdown 2020 (2021)

Sammy Hagar chronology
Best + Live (Chickenfoot) (2017)	Space Between (2019)	Lockdown 2020 (2021)

Singles from Space Between
- 1. "Trust Fund Baby" Released: January 28, 2019; 2. "Can't Hang" Released: April 9, 2019; 3. "Affirmation" Released: May 6, 2019

Space Between is the eighteenth studio album by American rock singer Sammy Hagar, and the first studio album to credit Sammy Hagar and the Circle. This album was released on May 10, 2019, by BMG. The album was produced by Hagar, Jaimeson Durr and guitarist Vic Johnson, and debuted at No. 4 on the US Billboard 200 chart, making it Hagar's second highest charting album to date.

== Track listing ==
All lyrics are written by Sammy Hagar, except where noted.

No.	Title	Lyrics	Music	Length
1.	"Devil Came to Philly"		Hagar	2:35
2.	"Full Circle Jam (Chump Change)"		Jason Bonham, Michael Anthony, Vic Johnson	3:38
3.	"Can't Hang"		Hagar	3:56
4.	"Wide Open Space"		Hagar	3:46
5.	"Free Man"		Bonham	4:20
6.	"Bottom Line"		Hagar	2:43
7.	"No Worries"	Hagar, Tom Solis	Hagar, Solis	3:27
8.	"Trust Fund Baby"		Bonham, Ronnie Montrose	4:15
9.	"Affirmation"		Hagar	3:20
10.	"Hey Hey (Without Greed)"		Hagar	2:51

== Personnel ==
Sammy Hagar and the Circle

- Michael Anthony – bass guitar, backing vocals
- Jason Bonham – drums, percussion, backing vocals
- Sammy Hagar – lead vocals, lead guitar, rhythm guitar
- Vic Johnson – guitar, backing vocals

Additional musicians

- Audie DeLone – keyboards
- Ian Hatton – additional guitar
- Brett Tuggle – keyboards

Production

- Steven Campodonico – engineer
- Jaimeson Durr – producer, recording, mixing
- Sammy Hagar – producer
- Ian Hatton – engineer
- Alan Howarth – engineer
- Ted Jensen – mastering
- Vic Johnson – producer
- F. Reid Shippen – mixing

== Charts ==
=== Weekly charts ===
Chart (2019)	Peak position
Belgian Albums (Ultratop Wallonia)	190
German Albums (Offizielle Top 100)	74
Scottish Albums (OCC)	39
Swiss Albums (Schweizer Hitparade)	25
UK Independent Albums (OCC)	16
UK Rock & Metal Albums (OCC)	4
US Billboard 200	4
US Digital Albums (Billboard)	7
US Independent Albums (Billboard)	1
US Top Album Sales (Billboard)	1
US Top Hard Rock Albums (Billboard)	1
US Top Rock Albums (Billboard)	1

=== Year-end charts ===
Chart (2019)	Position
US Top Rock Albums (Billboard)	83
