= Chickenfoot III =

Studio album by Chickenfoot
- Released: September 27, 2011
- Recorded: April 2010 / January–June 2011
- Studio: The Foot Locker / Red Rocker Recording
- Genre: Hard rock, heavy metal, blues rock
- Length: 45:12
- Label: eOne Music, earMUSIC, WHD Entertainment Japan
- Producer: Mike Fraser, Chickenfoot

Chickenfoot chronology
Chickenfoot (2009)	Chickenfoot III (2011)	LV (2012)

Singles from Chickenfoot III
- 1. "Big Foot" Released: August 2, 2011; 2. "Different Devil" Released: January 9, 2012

Sammy Hagar chronology
Chickenfoot (2009)	Chickenfoot III (2011)	LV (2012)

Professional ratings
Review scores
Source	Rating
AllMusic	3.5/5 stars
Rolling Stone Brasil	2.5/5 stars

Chickenfoot III is the second studio album by American hard rock band Chickenfoot, released on September 27, 2011. Despite the title, it is not actually the band's third album; other rumored titles that were mentioned include Chickenfoot IV (four). The first pressing of the album was packaged with a 3-D cover; it was later nominated for the Grammy Award for Best Recording Package at the 2012 ceremony.

== Production ==
The band began to record the album back in April 2010, when they had some free time. They demoed four unnamed songs and put one of them in a video describing the A.M.P.F. technology (which stands for "Audio Musical Performance Fidelity").

On July 8, 2011, the band posted a new video online of the first teaser of one of the songs from the new album with this message included in the video: "Attention Foot Soldiers. Get Your Boots On. September 27, 2011."

== Track listing ==
All tracks are written by Sammy Hagar and Joe Satriani, except where noted.

No.	Title	Writer(s)	Length
1.	"Last Temptation"		4:02
2.	"Alright Alright"	Chickenfoot	4:39
3.	"Different Devil"	Hagar, Satriani, Chad Smith	4:24
4.	"Up Next"		4:33
5.	"Lighten Up"		5:12
6.	"Come Closer"		4:08
7.	"Three and a Half Letters"		4:07
8.	"Big Foot"		3:49
9.	"Dubai Blues"		5:02
10.	"Something Going Wrong"		5:16
11.	"No Change" (bonus track)	Chickenfoot	4:24

=== Vinyl release ===
Limited pressings in red vinyl and blue vinyl were also released in 12" LP format, but the hidden track "No Change" is not on the vinyl versions.

=== Bonus tracks ===
Classic Rock fanpack
No.	Title	Length
11.	"Down the Drain" (live in Phoenix)	9:13
12.	"Oh Yeah" (live in Phoenix)	6:24

Deluxe edition (Disc 2)
No.	Title	Writer(s)	Length
1.	"Avenida Revolucion"	Sammy Hagar, Joe Satriani	5:56
2.	"Soap on a Rope"	Hagar, Satriani	5:32
3.	"Sexy Little Thing"	Hagar, Satriani	4:14
4.	"Oh Yeah"	Hagar, Satriani	4:54
5.	"Runnin' Out"	Hagar, Satriani	3:52
6.	"Get It Up"	Hagar, Satriani, Michael Anthony, Chad Smith	4:41
7.	"Down the Drain"	Hagar, Satriani	6:17
8.	"My Kinda Girl"	Hagar, Satriani	4:32
9.	"Learning to Fall"	Hagar, Satriani	5:13
10.	"Turnin' Left"	Hagar, Satriani	5:48
11.	"Future in the Past"	Hagar, Satriani, Anthony, Smith	6:38
12.	"Bitten by the Wolf"	Hagar, Satriani	4:24

Deluxe edition (Disc 3 – DVD)
No.	Title	Length
1.	"EPK"
2.	"Big Foot" (music video)
3.	"Turning Left" (Live in Phoenix)
4.	"Sexy Little Thing" (music video)

Deluxe edition (Disc 4: DVD)
No.	Title	Length
1.	"Avenida Revolucion" (live)
2.	"Soap on a Rope" (live at Montreaux, 2009)
3.	"Sexy Little Thing" (live at Montreaux, 2009)
4.	"Oh Yeah" (live)
5.	"Runnin' Out" (live)
6.	"Get It Up" (live)
7.	"Down the Drain" (live at Montreaux, 2009)
8.	"My Kinda Girl" (live)
9.	"Learning to Fall" (live)
10.	"Turnin' Left" (live)
11.	"Future in the Past" (live)
12.	"Bitten by the Wolf" (live)
13.	"Soap on a Rope" (music video)

Best Buy version bonus DVD
No.	Title	Length
1.	"The Greeting"
2.	"Making of the Chickenfoot III"
3.	"Behind the Scenes"
4.	"The Packaging"
5.	"Big Foot" (music video)

== Personnel ==
=== Chickenfoot ===
- Michael Anthony – bass guitar, backing vocals
- Sammy Hagar – lead vocals, rhythm guitar
- Joe Satriani – lead guitar, keyboards, piano
- Chad Smith – drums, percussion

=== Additional personnel ===
- Joani Bye – background vocals (6)
- Linda Bye – background vocals (6)
- Monique Creber – background vocals (6)
- Mike Fraser – production, engineering, mixing
- Mike Keneally – piano, organ (2, 3, 6)

== Chart performance ==
=== Weekly charts ===
Chart (2011)	Peak position
Australian Albums (ARIA)	46
Austrian Albums (Ö3 Austria)	11
Belgian Albums (Ultratop Flanders)	87
Belgian Albums (Ultratop Wallonia)	50
Canadian Albums (Billboard)	19
Dutch Albums (Album Top 100)	36
Finnish Albums (Suomen virallinen lista)	41
French Albums (SNEP)	81
German Albums (Offizielle Top 100)	13
Italian Albums (FIMI)	60
Japanese Albums (Oricon)	62
Swedish Albums (Sverigetopplistan)	45
Swiss Albums (Schweizer Hitparade)	12
US Billboard 200	9
US Independent Albums (Billboard)	2
US Top Hard Rock Albums (Billboard)	1
US Top Rock Albums (Billboard)	4
US Indie Store Album Sales (Billboard)	8

=== Year-end charts ===
Chart (2011)	Position
US Independent Albums (Billboard)	37
US Top Hard Rock Albums (Billboard)	23

== Sales ==
Region	Certification	Certified units/sales
United States	—	35,000
