= Poundcake (song) =

1991 single by Van Halen

Single by Van Halen

from the album For Unlawful Carnal Knowledge
- B-side: "Pleasure Dome"
- Released: June 10, 1991
- Studio: 5150 (Studio City, California)
- Length: 5:22
- Label: Warner Bros.
- Songwriters: Eddie Van Halen; Michael Anthony; Alex Van Halen; Sammy Hagar
- Producers: Andy Johns; Ted Templeman; Van Halen

Van Halen singles chronology
"Feels So Good" (1989)	"Poundcake" (1991)	"Top of the World" (1991)

Music videos
- "Poundcake" on YouTube

"Poundcake" is a song by American rock band Van Halen, included as the opening track on their ninth studio album, For Unlawful Carnal Knowledge. "Poundcake" was the first song to be released as a single from the album, reaching number one on the US Billboard Album Rock Tracks chart and number 74 on the UK Singles Chart. The CD single provides an 'interview with Van Halen' which begins with hearing Eddie say, "Hey, this is Eddie Van Halen...". In addition, "Poundcake" begins immediately with the drill and omits the sound of Edward plugging his guitar cable into the amplifier.

== Composition ==
Eddie Van Halen recalls that the song did not earn much of a reaction until producer Andy Johns suggested that he play the rhythm tracks with a 12-string guitar. Afterwards the band helped the composition of the song over the two electric 12-strings doubled beneath Eddie's usual dirty guitar. Regarding the guitar solo, Eddie said that "The solo goes four bars, another four bars, then two bars. Al kept insisting that it wasn't finished. He likes to count, and I never do. I'm strictly feel. I'm always screwing around with time, because I never count." The solo also includes a handful of chords played relatively quietly in the background on keyboards, in the very middle of the solo.

The song is in the key of E major, with the guitar solo in the key of F♯ minor, having a moderate rock common time tempo of 108 beats per minute.

=== Power drill ===
The song features Eddie Van Halen using a Makita 6012HD power drill in the introduction and during the guitar solo. According to Eddie, a guitar technician was operating one of the drills at 5150 Studios while he was playing, and the sound captured was akin to "kick starting your engine". Subsequently, Eddie painted a drill with the Frankenstrat stripes to use during concerts.

== Reception ==
Chuck Klosterman of Vulture.com ranked it the 35th-best Van Halen song, largely praising the song but calling the lyrics "straight-up sewage-drain awful".

== Music video ==
The official music video for "Poundcake," directed by Andy Morahan, shows Eddie using the technique with a Makita cordless power drill painted in his trademark red, black and white stripes. The video, itself, cuts between scenes of the band playing and a demure young lady - played by Diane Manzo - who has shown up for an audition (a handmade sign on the wall says "Van Halen Casting"). While waiting, she spies on the other girls through a hole in the changing room door and is fascinated by their provocative dress and behavior. When they finally notice her, one - played by Tania Coleridge - uses a power drill to create a hole in the door and harass her, ultimately scaring her off. The video was filmed at the Olympic Auditorium in Los Angeles.

The video is also preceded with a young girl reciting a poem of "What Are Little Boys Made Of?" The video ends with a blooper of the girl making a mistake and the director saying they will do another take.

== Charts ==
=== Weekly charts ===
Weekly chart performance for "Poundcake"
Chart (1991)	Peak position
Australia (ARIA)	55
UK Singles (OCC)	74
US Album Rock Tracks (Billboard)	1

=== Year-end charts ===
Year-end chart performance for "Poundcake"
Chart (1991)	Position
US Album Rock Tracks (Billboard)	34

== Release history ==
Region	Date	Format(s)	Label(s)	Ref.
United Kingdom	June 10, 1991	7-inch vinyl; 12-inch vinyl; CD; cassette	Warner Bros.	
Australia	June 17, 1991	7-inch vinyl; cassette	Warner Bros.	
Japan	July 10, 1991	Mini-CD	Warner Bros.	
Australia	July 15, 1991	12-inch vinyl; CD	Warner Bros.	
