= Finish What Ya Started =

Single by Van Halen

from the album OU812
- B-side: "Sucker in a 3 Piece"
- Released: September 1988
- Recorded: 1987–1988
- Studio: 5150 Studios, Studio City, California
- Genre: Country rock, blues rock; Americana
- Length: 4:20
- Label: Warner Bros.
- Songwriters: Eddie Van Halen; Alex Van Halen; Michael Anthony; Sammy Hagar
- Producers: Van Halen; Donn Landee

Van Halen singles chronology
"When It's Love" (1988)	"Finish What Ya Started" (1988)	"Feels So Good" (1989)

"Finish What Ya Started" is a song by Van Halen taken from their 1988 album OU812.

== Background ==
Despite the album being seemingly complete, Eddie Van Halen came up with the riff at 2 in the morning and went down to his then-neighbor Sammy Hagar to show it. Hagar let Eddie in, and the two played guitars in his balcony until they had a completed song. Once Eddie left, Hagar decided to write the lyrics despite being late at night. The theme wound up being sex without orgasm, summed up by Hagar as "blue balls". In the song, Eddie recorded his guitar part on a Fender Stratocaster plugged direct into the studio mixing console. The song is one of only two Van Halen tracks featuring Hagar playing a rhythm guitar part, which he played on a Gibson acoustic.

The version of the song on their 2004 compilation The Best of Both Worlds has no fade out unlike the album version.

== Music video ==
The official music video for the song was directed by Andy Morahan. It features the band playing against a plain white background with quick cuts to women dancing.

== Charts ==
Chart (1988–89)	Peak position
US Billboard Hot 100	13
US Billboard Mainstream Rock	2

== Reception ==
Cash Box called it "a remarkable single...that owes more to T-Rex and Creedence than to a Whitesnake."

In 1988, the song peaked at #13 on the Billboard Hot 100 and #2 on the Billboard rock chart.

== In popular culture ==
The song was later used as theme music for the short-lived 1990 sitcom Sydney, which starred Eddie Van Halen's then-wife, Valerie Bertinelli.
