= OU812 Tour =

1988–1989 concert tour by Van Halen

- Tour by Van Halen
- Location: Asia; North America
- Associated album: OU812
- Start date: May 27, 1988
- End date: February 4, 1989
- Legs: 4
- No. of shows: 76

Van Halen concert chronology
- 5150 Tour (1986); OU812 Tour (1988–1989); For Unlawful Carnal Knowledge Tour (1991–1992)

The OU812 Tour was a concert tour by the American hard rock band Van Halen in support of their studio album OU812.

== Background ==
Van Halen began their tour with a United States leg known as the "Monsters of Rock" tour through 23 cities alongside Metallica, Scorpions, Dokken and Kingdom Come which would feature a specially constructed stage with lights and state-of-the-art sound equipment. The tour originated when promoter Louis Messina had approached the band and suggested a five-band summer long tour, up to which the band didn't hesitate to sign. In the end, the leg itself was a financial failure, though it would be their most expensive tour. Some of the cities the band performed in during the "Monsters of Rock" tour had however shown some success while there was confusion from the promoters where the tour didn't do well, bringing up speculation that the album wasn't familiar with the audience yet, while others stated that the shows were on a weekday while school was going on. During the show in East Troy, Hagar fell during the opening song on the set, receiving a minor tailbone fracture. Despite his injury, he did finish the performance. Following the Monsters of Rock tour, the band did go on a brief hiatus before continuing the tour. On the second North American leg, Van Halen performed in smaller venues, wrapping up the tour with shows in Japan and Hawaii.

== Reception ==
Mark Madden, a staff writer from the Pittsburgh Post-Gazette gave the performance at the Three Rivers Stadium a positive review. He acknowledged that more than 35,000 fans couldn't help but be struck when Eddie Van Halen's fleet fingers played through two hours of the band's biggest hits. Regarding Eddie's solo Madden added that the biggest technical sparkle was that he was successfully able to play within the context of his songs and did not play a bad solo that night. Including Hagar, Madden stated that he brought all the fun, with good vocals and songs - but didn't forget to add about Michael Anthony and Alex Van Halen whom Madden stated were a quality foundation. During the conclusion of his review, Madden noted that the biggest strength for the band's performance was definitely their songs.

Jeff Bunch from the Spokesman Review gave the performance at the Albi Stadium a positive review. In his opening statement, Bunch stated that rock 'n' roll was alive and well in Spokane and that it was better than nothing. He noted on the music being "hot", bringing the crowd to decibel levels that matched the band's sound system which he cited as "powerful". He acknowledged the members' solos, with Eddie Van Halen's being cited as "magical" as he captivated the audience for nearly ten minutes with his lightning-quick fingers. Not forgetting Alex Van Halen or Hagar, he brought up their solos as well - referring to Hagar as a bundle of energy, adding that he is a consummate showman. Bunch concluded his review, stating that it was a great concert, and that people got their money's worth, though he did say that it would be hard to say if the band's show had lived up to its expectations.

Jerry Spangler from the Deseret News gave the Salt Palace performance he attended a mixed review. He stated that while the band had shown to be the best there is on the hard rock circuit, they still lacked the style that could one day make them one of the best bands of all time, referring to them as a good time to a near-capacity crowd they performed for. Spangler noted on one of the show's highlights when Hagar had taken center stage for an acoustic guitar solo, praising it as "warm" and "optimism". He cited that Hagar was the surprise for the show aside from the characteristic of Eddie Van Halen, but did criticize that confidence Hagar presented would translate into inanities.

"The first time I went to a 'big' concert was the Monsters of Rock in 1987 (sic), at a stadium in DC: Kingdom Come, Metallica, Dokken, Scorpions and Van Halen," recalled Dave Grohl. "Standing far enough from the stage that it was taking four seconds for the sound of the snare drum to hit me made no sense at all."

== Tour dates ==
List of 1988 concerts, showing date, city, country and venue
Date	City	Country	Venue
May 27, 1988	East Troy	United States	Alpine Valley Music Theatre
May 28, 1988	East Troy	United States	Alpine Valley Music Theatre
May 29, 1988	East Troy	United States	Alpine Valley Music Theatre
June 4, 1988	Miami	United States	Orange Bowl
June 5, 1988	Tampa	United States	Tampa Stadium
June 10, 1988	Washington, D.C.	United States	RFK Stadium
June 11, 1988	Philadelphia	United States	JFK Stadium
June 12, 1988	Foxborough	United States	Sullivan Stadium
June 15, 1988	Pittsburgh	United States	Three Rivers Stadium
June 17, 1988	Pontiac	United States	Silverdome
June 18, 1988	Pontiac	United States	Silverdome
June 19, 1988	Buffalo	United States	Rich Stadium
June 22, 1988	Akron	United States	Rubber Bowl
June 23, 1988	Akron	United States	Rubber Bowl
June 25, 1988	Oxford	United States	Oxford Plains Speedway
June 26, 1988	East Rutherford	United States	Giants Stadium
June 27, 1988	East Rutherford	United States	Giants Stadium
July 2, 1988	Houston	United States	Rice Stadium
July 3, 1988	Dallas	United States	Cotton Bowl
July 6, 1988	Indianapolis	United States	Hoosier Dome
July 9, 1988	Memphis	United States	Liberty Bowl Memorial Stadium
July 10, 1988	Kansas City	United States	Arrowhead Stadium
July 13, 1988	Minneapolis	United States	Hubert H. Humphrey Metrodome
July 17, 1988	San Francisco	United States	Candlestick Park
July 20, 1988	Spokane	United States	Joe Albi Stadium
July 24, 1988	Los Angeles	United States	Los Angeles Memorial Coliseum
July 27, 1988	Seattle	United States	Kingdome
July 30, 1988	Denver	United States	Mile High Stadium
September 30, 1988	Lexington	United States	Rupp Arena
October 1, 1988	Cincinnati	United States	Riverfront Coliseum
October 3, 1988	Atlanta	United States	Omni Coliseum
October 4, 1988	Antioch	United States	Starwood Amphitheatre
October 6, 1988	Greensboro	United States	Greensboro Coliseum
October 7, 1988	Charlotte	United States	Charlotte Coliseum
October 8, 1988	Knoxville	United States	Thompson–Boling Arena
October 11, 1988	New York City	United States	Madison Square Garden
October 12, 1988	Uniondale	United States	Nassau Coliseum
October 14, 1988	Hartford	United States	Hartford Civic Center
October 15, 1988	Syracuse	United States	Carrier Dome
October 17, 1988	Providence	United States	Providence Civic Center
October 18, 1988	Worcester	United States	Centrum in Worcester
October 20, 1988	Richmond	United States	Richmond Coliseum
October 21, 1988	Norfolk	United States	Norfolk Scope
October 22, 1988	Philadelphia	United States	Spectrum
October 25, 1988	Rosemont	United States	Rosemont Horizon
October 26, 1988	Fort Wayne	United States	Allen County War Memorial Coliseum
October 27, 1988	Fort Wayne	United States	Allen County War Memorial Coliseum
October 28, 1988	Milwaukee	United States	Bradley Center
October 30, 1988	Notre Dame	United States	Joyce Center
October 31, 1988	Cedar Rapids	United States	Five Seasons Center
November 1, 1988	Ames	United States	Hilton Coliseum
November 4, 1988	Valley Center	United States	Kansas Coliseum
November 5, 1988	Lincoln	United States	Bob Devaney Sports Center
November 7, 1988	Peoria	United States	Peoria Civic Center
November 8, 1988	St. Louis	United States	St. Louis Arena
November 9, 1988	St. Louis	United States	St. Louis Arena
November 11, 1988	New Orleans	United States	Lakefront Arena
November 13, 1988	Austin	United States	Frank Erwin Center
November 15, 1988	El Paso	United States	UTEP Special Events Center
November 16, 1988	Tucson	United States	Tucson Community Center
November 17, 1988	Phoenix	United States	Arizona Veterans Memorial Coliseum
November 19, 1988	San Diego	United States	San Diego Sports Arena
November 21, 1988	Sacramento	United States	ARCO Arena
November 22, 1988	Reno	United States	Lawlor Events Center
November 24, 1988	Portland	United States	Memorial Coliseum
November 26, 1988	Salt Lake City	United States	Salt Palace

List of 1989 concerts, showing date, city, country and venue
Date	City	Country	Venue
January 19, 1989	Tokyo	Japan	Tokyo Dome
January 23, 1989	Kyoto	Japan	Kyoto Pulse Plaza
January 24, 1989	Osaka	Japan	Osaka-jō Hall
January 25, 1989	Osaka	Japan	Osaka-jō Hall
January 27, 1989	Hiroshima	Japan	Hiroshima Sun Plaza
January 29, 1989	Kyoto	Japan	Kyoto Pulse Plaza
January 31, 1989	Nagoya	Japan	Nagoya Rainbow Hall
February 1, 1989	Tokyo	Japan	Tokyo Dome
February 2, 1989	Tokyo	Japan	Tokyo Dome
February 4, 1989	Honolulu	United States	Neal S. Blaisdell Center
February 5, 1989	Honolulu	United States	Neal S. Blaisdell Center

== Personnel ==
- Eddie Van Halen – guitar, backing vocals, lead keyboards
- Michael Anthony – bass, backing vocals, keyboards
- Alex Van Halen – drums
- Sammy Hagar – lead vocals, guitar
