= For Unlawful Carnal Knowledge Tour =

1991–92 concert tour by Van Halen

- Tour by Van Halen
- Poster to the concerts in Philadelphia
- Location: North America
- Associated album: For Unlawful Carnal Knowledge
- Start date: August 16, 1991
- End date: May 31, 1992
- Legs: 3
- No. of shows: 99

Van Halen concert chronology
- OU812 Tour (1988–1989); For Unlawful Carnal Knowledge Tour (1991–1992); Right Here Right Now Tour (1993)

The For Unlawful Carnal Knowledge Tour (often abbreviated as the F.U.C.K. Tour or simply The Fuck Tour) was a concert tour by the American rock band Van Halen in support of their studio album For Unlawful Carnal Knowledge. It was one of the band's longer tours, divided into 99 dates. It featured shows in Hawaii and Mexico, places Van Halen rarely played in their history.

Sammy Hagar chose Alice in Chains to be the opening act after seeing the music video for their hit single "Man In The Box" on MTV.

At the two Fresno, California, shows, the band filmed and recorded material for the live double album Live: Right Here, Right Now and live VHS Van Halen: Right Here, Right Now – Live (later also released on laserdisc and DVD). Promotion for these live works was the foundation of the band's next tour. However, Rhino Entertainment published Live in Dallas 1991 as the second live album from the tour in 2024, released after the band was disbanded in 2020.

This tour included the song "Jump" in the set list. This song from 1984 had been the band's only US Hot 100 number 1, but in his attempt to 'forget' the band's past, Sammy Hagar had refused to sing it when he joined the band in 1985. Now an established member of the line-up, he agreed to sing it more often. This tour also marked the first time that keyboards were not performed live on stage by Eddie Van Halen. Keyboard and piano parts were performed off stage by Night Ranger keyboardist Alan Fitzgerald.

The tour was managed by touring veteran Scotty Ross, who has also managed the tours of Poison, Dio, Saliva and Celtic Woman.

== Tour dates ==
List of 1991 concerts, showing date, city, country and venue
Date	City	Country	Venue
August 16, 1991	Atlanta	United States	Coca-Cola Lakewood Amphitheatre
August 17, 1991	Antioch	United States	Starwood Amphitheatre
August 20, 1991	Burgettstown	United States	Coca-Cola Star Lake Amphitheater
August 21, 1991	Cuyahoga Falls	United States	Blossom Music Center
August 24, 1991	Noblesville	United States	Deer Creek Music Center
August 25, 1991	Maryland Heights	United States	Riverport Amphitheater
August 26, 1991	Bonner Springs	United States	Sandstone Amphitheater
August 29, 1991	Clarkston	United States	Pine Knob Music Theatre
August 31, 1991	Milwaukee	United States	Marcus Amphitheater
September 1, 1991	Tinley Park	United States	World Music Theatre
September 6, 1991	Greenwood Village	United States	Fiddler's Green Amphitheatre
September 8, 1991	Phoenix	United States	Desert Sky Pavilion
September 9, 1991	Sacramento	United States	Cal-Expo Amphitheatre
September 10, 1991	Costa Mesa	United States	Pacific Amphitheatre
September 11, 1991	Costa Mesa	United States	Pacific Amphitheatre
September 13, 1991	Mountain View	United States	Shoreline Amphitheatre
September 14, 1991	Mountain View	United States	Shoreline Amphitheatre
September 15, 1991	Sacramento	United States	Cal Expo Amphitheatre
October 8, 1991	Portland	United States	Cumberland County Civic Center
October 9, 1991	Providence	United States	Providence Civic Center
October 11, 1991	Hampton	United States	Hampton Coliseum
October 12, 1991	Raleigh	United States	Hardee's Walnut Creek Amphitheatre
October 15, 1991	Philadelphia	United States	The Spectrum
October 16, 1991	Philadelphia	United States	The Spectrum
October 17, 1991	Landover	United States	Capital Centre
October 20, 1991	Buffalo	United States	Buffalo Memorial Auditorium
October 23, 1991	Albany	United States	Knickerbocker Arena
October 24, 1991	East Rutherford	United States	Brendan Byrne Arena
October 25, 1991	East Rutherford	United States	Brendan Byrne Arena
October 27, 1991	Uniondale	United States	Nassau Veterans Memorial Coliseum
October 29, 1991	Hartford	United States	Hartford Civic Center
October 30, 1991	Worcester	United States	Centrum in Worcester
October 31, 1991	Worcester	United States	Centrum in Worcester
November 3, 1991	Montreal	Canada	Montreal Forum
November 4, 1991	Toronto	Canada	SkyDome
November 7, 1991	Winnipeg	Canada	Winnipeg Arena
November 9, 1991	Edmonton	Canada	Northlands Coliseum
November 10, 1991	Saskatoon	Canada	Saskatchewan Place
November 11, 1991	Calgary	Canada	Olympic Saddledome
November 13, 1991	Vancouver	Canada	BC Place Stadium
~~November 14, 1991~~	~~Tacoma~~	United States	~~Tacoma Dome~~
~~November 15, 1991~~	~~Portland~~	United States	~~Portland Memorial Coliseum~~
December 2, 1991	Memphis	United States	Pyramid Arena
December 3, 1991	Shreveport	United States	Hirsch Memorial Coliseum
December 4, 1991	Dallas	United States	West End Marketplace
December 6, 1991	Biloxi	United States	Mississippi Coast Coliseum
December 7, 1991	Baton Rouge	United States	Riverside Centroplex
December 9, 1991	Tallahassee	United States	Tallahassee-Leon County Civic Center
December 10, 1991	Jacksonville	United States	Jacksonville Memorial Coliseum
December 12, 1991	St. Petersburg	United States	Florida Suncoast Dome
December 13, 1991	Miami	United States	Miami Arena
December 14, 1991	Orlando	United States	Orlando Arena

List of 1992 concerts, showing date, city, country and venue
Date	City	Country	Venue
January 22, 1992	Tacoma	United States	Tacoma Dome
January 23, 1992	Portland	United States	Portland Memorial Coliseum
January 28, 1992	Dallas	United States	Reunion Arena
January 29, 1992	Austin	United States	Frank Erwin Center
January 31, 1992	Houston	United States	The Summit
February 2, 1992	Oklahoma City	United States	Myriad Convention Center
February 3, 1992	Valley Center	United States	Kansas Coliseum
February 5, 1992	Carbondale	United States	SIU Arena
February 7, 1992	Cincinnati	United States	Riverfront Coliseum
February 8, 1992	Louisville	United States	Freedom Hall
February 9, 1992	Evansville	United States	Roberts Municipal Stadium
February 12, 1992	Chattanooga	United States	UTC Arena
February 14, 1992	Birmingham	United States	Birmingham-Jefferson Civic Center
February 15, 1992	Huntsville	United States	Von Braun Civic Center
February 16, 1992	Knoxville	United States	Thompson–Boling Arena
~~February 19, 1992~~	~~Kalamazoo~~	United States	~~Wings Stadium~~
~~February 21, 1992~~	~~Auburn Hills~~	United States	~~The Palace of Auburn Hills~~
~~February 22, 1992~~	~~Auburn Hills~~	United States	~~The Palace of Auburn Hills~~
~~February 24, 1992~~	~~Fort Wayne~~	United States	~~Allen County War Memorial Coliseum~~
February 26, 1992	Roanoke	United States	Roanoke Civic Center
February 28, 1992	Charlotte	United States	Charlotte Coliseum
February 29, 1992	Columbia	United States	Carolina Coliseum
March 2, 1992	Kalamazoo	United States	Wings Stadium
March 3, 1992	Fort Wayne	United States	Allen County War Memorial Coliseum
April 3, 1992	Auburn Hills	United States	The Palace of Auburn Hills
April 4, 1992	Auburn Hills	United States	The Palace of Auburn Hills
April 6, 1992	Manhattan	United States	Bramlage Coliseum
April 7, 1992	Omaha	United States	Omaha Civic Auditorium
April 8, 1992	Little Rock	United States	Barton Coliseum
April 10, 1992	Cedar Rapids	United States	Five Seasons Center
April 11, 1992	Peoria	United States	Peoria Civic Center
April 12, 1992	Columbia	United States	Hearnes Center
April 15, 1992	St. Louis	United States	St. Louis Arena
April 17, 1992	Minneapolis	United States	Target Center
April 18, 1992	Ames	United States	Hilton Coliseum
April 19, 1992	Omaha	United States	Omaha Civic Auditorium
~~April 22, 1992~~	~~Rapid City~~	United States	~~Rushmore Plaza Civic Center~~
April 23, 1992	Billings	United States	MetraPark Arena
April 25, 1992	Denver	United States	McNichols Sports Arena
April 27, 1992	Albuquerque	United States	Tingley Coliseum
April 28, 1992	El Paso	United States	El Paso County Coliseum
May 1, 1992	San Diego	United States	San Diego Sports Arena
May 6, 1992	Paradise	United States	Thomas & Mack Center
May 8, 1992	Daly City	United States	Cow Palace
May 9, 1992	Reno	United States	Lawlor Events Center
May 10, 1992	Sacramento	United States	ARCO Arena
May 12, 1992	Inglewood	United States	Great Western Forum
May 14, 1992	Fresno	United States	Selland Arena
May 15, 1992	Fresno	United States	Selland Arena
May 16, 1992	Inglewood	United States	Great Western Forum
May 17, 1992	Tucson	United States	McKale Center
May 23, 1992	Mexico City	Mexico	Palacio de los Deportes
May 24, 1992	Mexico City	Mexico	Palacio de los Deportes
May 29, 1992	Honolulu	United States	Neal S. Blaisdell Center
May 30, 1992	Honolulu	United States	Neal S. Blaisdell Center
May 31, 1992	Honolulu	United States	Neal S. Blaisdell Center

=== Box office score data ===
List of box office score data with date, city, venue, attendance, gross, references
Date (1991)	City	Venue	Attendance	Gross	Ref(s)
September 13–14	Mountain View, United States	Shoreline Amphitheatre	39,268 / 39,268	$990,762	
September 15	Sacramento, United States	Cal Expo Amphitheatre	14,188 / 14,188	$390,515	

== Personnel ==
- Eddie Van Halen – guitar, backing vocals
- Michael Anthony – bass, backing vocals, keyboards
- Alex Van Halen – drums
- Sammy Hagar – lead vocals, guitar

Additional musician

- Alan Fitzgerald – keyboards
