= When It's Love =

Single by Van Halen

from the album OU812
- B-side: "Cabo Wabo"
- Released: June 1988
- Recorded: 1987
- Studio: 5150 Studios, Studio City, California
- Genre: Pop metal
- Length: 5:38
- Label: Warner Bros.
- Songwriters: Eddie Van Halen; Alex Van Halen; Michael Anthony; Sammy Hagar
- Producers: Donn Landee; Van Halen

Van Halen singles chronology
"Black and Blue" (1988)	"When It's Love" (1988)	"Finish What Ya Started" (1988)

Official audio
- When It's Love on YouTube

When It's Love is a power ballad by American rock band Van Halen. It was released in 1988 as the second single from their eighth studio album OU812. It was the most popular song from that album, hitting No. 1 on the Billboard Mainstream Rock charts and No. 5 on the Billboard Hot 100 chart. The song has been a live performance staple since it was released in 1988. The song was also included in the set list for the band's ill-fated 1998 tour with Gary Cherone. Eddie Van Halen has stated that this particular guitar solo is a nod to Eric Clapton. It became their 3rd and last top 10 hit.

== Reception ==
It was featured on a VH1 special, The Greatest: 25 Greatest Power Ballads, where it was ranked as the 24th greatest power ballad of all time.

== Charts ==
=== Weekly charts ===
Weekly chart performance for "When It's Love"
Chart (1988)	Peak position
Australia (ARIA)	23
Canada (The Record)	34
Irish Singles Chart	23
UK Singles (OCC)	28
US Billboard Hot 100	5
US Billboard Mainstream Rock	1

=== Year-end charts ===
Year-end chart performance for "When It's Love"
Chart (1988)	Position
US Billboard Hot 100	82

== In popular culture ==
The notes of When It's Love are played throughout the 80s-set Bluey episode Fairytale. In the Bluey album Rug Island, the eight track is titled Fairytale, again including the notes of When It's Love.

== See also ==
- List of glam metal albums and songs
