= Right Now (Van Halen song) =

1992 single by Van Halen

- 1992 US cassette cover

Single by Van Halen

from the album For Unlawful Carnal Knowledge
- B-side: "Man On A Mission"
- Released: February 1992
- Recorded: March 1990 – April 1991
- Studio: 5150 Studios, Hollywood, CA
- Genre: Hard rock
- Length: 4:21 (single version); 5:21 (album version)
- Label: Warner Bros.
- Songwriters: Eddie Van Halen; Sammy Hagar; Alex Van Halen; Michael Anthony
- Producers: Van Halen; Ted Templeman; Andy Johns

Van Halen singles chronology
"Top of the World" (1991)	"Right Now" (1992)	"The Dream Is Over" (1992)

Music videos
- "Right Now" on YouTube

"Right Now" is a song written by the group Van Halen for their 1991 album For Unlawful Carnal Knowledge.

== Writing and composition ==
According to guitarist Eddie Van Halen, the instrumental dates back to 1983, "before I wrote "Jump" – it didn't come out until about '92, '93 or something like that, cause nobody wanted anything to do with it." An early version of the melody appears in the 1984 movie The Wild Life which was scored by Eddie. Eddie also stated that before vocalist Sammy Hagar was hired to replace David Lee Roth, he considered an album that would feature various guest singers, with Joe Cocker assigned to "Right Now".

Hagar says the lyrics for "Right Now" were the best he ever wrote for a Van Halen song. "I was tired of writing cheap sex songs," he recalled almost two decades later. "Eddie and I wanted to get serious and talk about world issues." Different edits of the video had been used in Van Halen's 2004 tour to make more explicitly political statements in later years.

== Music video ==
The music video (directed by Mark Fenske and produced by Carolyn Beug) reflected on events that were occurring at the time, both within the band and social issues in the world around them. It used big block letters to display sentences such as "Right now, people are having unprotected sex" and "Right now, someone is working too hard for minimum wage", to describe the footage in the background.

Hagar was initially opposed to the video's concept when the treatment was first presented to him. He stated: "People ain't even going to be listening to what I'm saying because they'll be reading these subtitles" (one of the messages in the video even brings this up: "Right now maybe we should pay attention to the lyrics"). Despite Warner chairman Mo Ostin phoning him stating that it would be the biggest music video in the group's career, he was still so angry that he disappeared to South Carolina for a week with his then-girlfriend.

During the actual filming, he contracted pneumonia and was suffering from a fever, which intensified his anger over the video. Fenske says he did not notice, but allows that he was nervous and busy since it was the first video he had directed and he had many other things to pay attention to. According to Hagar, the scene where he stands away from the microphone and refuses to sing, and the end of the video where he slams the dressing room door were not staged – he was genuinely angry.

"For the idea of the girl setting fire to a guy's photo," Fenske recalls, "I had a photo of me at 24 that I didn't mind burning." He says everyone in the video was either a crew member or band member, save one – his mother. He brought her to the Video Music Awards as his date.

=== Reception ===
The video won three awards at the 1992 MTV Video Music Awards, including the award for Video of the Year. Bassist Michael Anthony thought it was the best video Van Halen had ever done. Despite the accolades, Hagar allegedly expressed disappointment with the result, stating "I don't think it's enough about the band."

Hagar eventually admitted that he was rather impressed with the music video, calling it "brilliant." He clarified that his difficulty cooperating during the video shoot stemmed from the initial storyboard treatment that Fenske presented, which Hagar felt was disorganized, unclear, and missed the meaning of a song that he took much pride in writing. He went on to laud Fenske for his work. Hagar would later reuse the video concept and the "right now" lyric for the title track of his 2008 solo album Cosmic Universal Fashion.

== Personnel ==
- Sammy Hagar – lead vocals, rhythm guitar
- Eddie Van Halen – lead guitar, keyboards, backing vocals
- Michael Anthony – bass, backing vocals
- Alex Van Halen – drums, percussion, backing vocals

== Chart performance ==
Chart (1992)	Peak position
US Billboard Hot 100	55
US Radio Songs (Billboard)	66
US Mainstream Rock (Billboard)	2
US CHR/Pop Airplay (Radio & Records)	23
US AOR Tracks Top 60 (Radio & Records)	1
US Cashbox Top Singles	27

== In popular culture ==
The song was later used in Crystal Pepsi commercials between 1992 and 1993. Eddie said that he agreed to license the song to PepsiCo because he knew that if he did not, the company would hire studio musicians to record a cover. However, the band ended up receiving significant backlash as a result of the decision.

=== Politics ===
The song has been used numerous times by U.S. political candidates. On August 29, 2008 during a campaign rally in Ohio, after Senator John McCain's announcement of Alaska Governor Sarah Palin as his running mate and her remarks, this song was played over the sound system. Band members reportedly disagreed about its use at the McCain rally—Alex and Eddie Van Halen issued a statement saying "Permission was not sought or granted nor would it have been given." Hagar, although he did not specifically endorse McCain, said that he personally did not have any problem with the McCain campaign's use of the song, insisting that no matter which candidate used the song, the lyrics still had the same meaning. During his 2016 presidential campaign, Donald Trump used the song at his rallies.

The band has also used the song for political statements. Although Van Halen vocalist Sammy Hagar was a financial supporter of President George W. Bush in his 2004 re-election campaign, during the 2004 reunion tour, the band projected the "Right Now" music video, with a few extra modern scenes, on a large screen behind them while they performed the song. Some new modern scenes were, "Right now, someone is driving too fast for the last time" and "Right now, a 13-year-old is illegally downloading this song." Another of the updates was a new image of Bush, accompanied by the caption "Right now, nothing is more expensive than regret" (the original video used the image of an unused condom with this caption, implying unplanned parenthood).
