= Crazy Times (album) =

Studio album by Sammy Hagar and the Circle
- Released: September 30, 2022
- Recorded: Late 2021
- Studio: RCA Studio A (Nashville, Tennessee)
- Genre: Hard rock
- Length: 37:24
- Label: UMe
- Producer: Dave Cobb

Sammy Hagar and the Circle chronology
Lockdown 2020 (2021)	Crazy Times (2022)

I realized I had all this pent-up stuff, and it came pouring out. It was automatic to the point that I was writing lyrics on the spot. And for the first time in a long time, I felt like I was writing about things relative to everyone.

— Sammy Hagar on the lyric themes and writing process for Crazy Times

Crazy Times is a 2022 studio album by hard rock supergroup Sammy Hagar and the Circle. The album follows 2021's covers album Lockdown 2020 and continues themes related to the confusion and historic nature of the COVID-19 pandemic, as well as critiques of corporate greed and reflections on aging.

== Reception ==
Editors of AllMusic Guide rated this release four out of five stars, with critic Stephen Thomas Erlewine writing that "the party tunes play off the reflective numbers, creating something that hints at emotional depth". Writing for Ultimate Classic Rock, Micahel Gallucci stated that "results vary" in the quality on the album and that producer Dave Cobb's "job here is to reign in Hagar's most base instincts, and for the most part, he succeeds".

== Track listing ==
1. "Intro: The Beginning of the End" (Sammy Hagar) – 1:50
2. "Slow Drain" (Michael Anthony, Jason Bonham, Dave Cobb, Hagar, and Vic Johnson) – 4:55
3. "Feed Your Head" (Hagar) – 3:18
4. "Pump It Up" (Elvis Costello) – 3:01
5. "Be Still" (Hagar and Mark Tamburino) – 4:01
6. "You Get What You Pay For" (Hagar) – 3:56
7. "Crazy Times" (Anthony, Bonham, Cobb, Hagar, and Johnson) – 4:26
8. "Funky Feng Shui" (Anthony, Bonham, Cobb, Hagar, and Johnson) – 2:17
9. "Father Time" (Hagar) – 4:05
10. "Childhood's End" (Hagar) – 5:35

Bonus tracks on digital edition

11. "2120" (Hagar and Tamburino) – 4:27
12. "Father Time" (acoustic demo) – 3:45

Walmart exclusive bonus hits disc

1. "I Can't Drive 55"
2. "Heavy Metal"
3. "Your Love Is Driving Me Crazy"
4. "There's Only One Way to Rock"
5. "Mas Tequila"
6. "I'll Fall in Love Again"
7. "Three Lock Box"
8. "Eagles Fly"
9. "Baby's on Fire"
10. "Give to Live"

== Personnel ==
Sammy Hagar and the Circle

- Michael Anthony – bass guitar, backing vocals
- Jason Bonham – drums, percussion, backing vocals
- Sammy Hagar – vocals, rhythm guitar
- Vic Johnson – lead and rhythm guitar, backing vocals

Additional personnel

- Andrew Brightman – production coordination
- Dave Cobb – production
- Jaimeson Durr – engineering
- Michael Fahey – assistant engineering
- Todd Gallopo – art direction, design, photo illustration
- Pete Lyman – mastering
- Itoh Masanori – liner notes on Japanese edition
- Vance Powell – engineering, mixing
- Phillip Smith – assistant engineering
- Leah Steiger – band photo
