= Grave disability =

Term in United States disability law

Grave disability or gravely disabled is a legal status used as a criterion in addition to danger to self or others as the basis for involuntary commitment in only 9 of 50 states of the United States. It is not a criterion in Washington, D.C.

In California, it is defined as "a condition in which a person, as a result of a mental health disorder," ...(or impairment by chronic alcoholism)..., "is unable to provide for his or her basic personal needs for food, clothing, or shelter."

Some states such as Louisiana also include substance-related or addictive disorders and add medical care to needs.

It may also be used in certain defined violent felony cases for mental incompetence.
