= Chickenfoot =

American rock supergroup

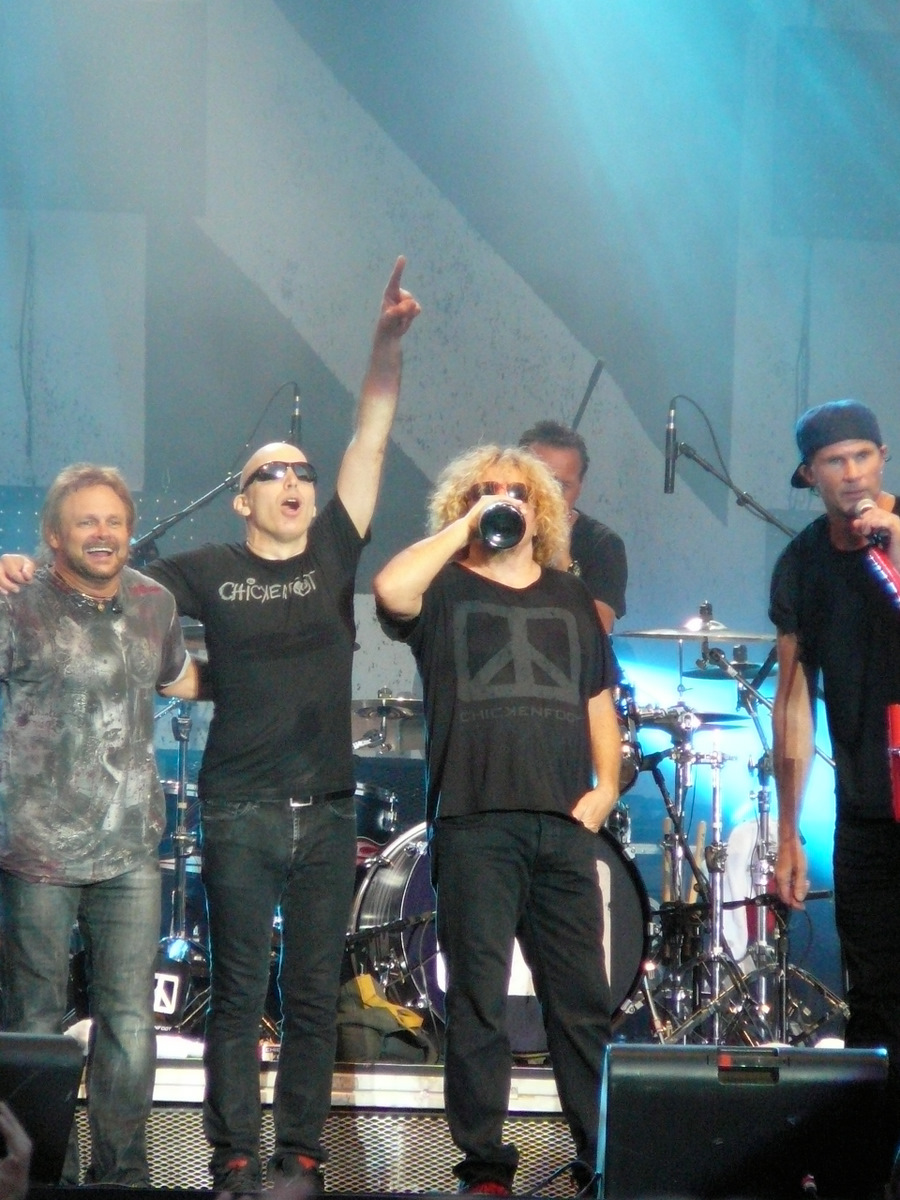
- Live at the Bospop festival, 2009. Left to right: Michael Anthony, Joe Satriani, Sammy Hagar, Chad Smith.

Background information
- Origin: Cabo San Lucas, Baja California Sur, Mexico
- Genres: Hard rock; blues rock
- Years active: 2008–2012; 2016 (on hiatus)
- Labels: eOne; Redline
- Website: www.chickenfoot.us

Chickenfoot is an American hard rock supergroup formed in 2008. The group consists of vocalist Sammy Hagar, bassist Michael Anthony, guitarist Joe Satriani, and drummer Chad Smith. When Smith is unavailable for live performances and tours, Kenny Aronoff has served as the group’s drummer. The group has released two studio albums, one live album, and one box set.

While the band has not formally announced a breakup, in June 2016 Smith said that he had doubts about its survival due to their busy schedules.

In 2025, Jeff Mezydlo of Yardbarker included the band in his list of "the greatest metal acts that formed in the 2000s".

== History ==
=== Chickenfoot (2008–2009) ===
According to vocalist Sammy Hagar: "Chickenfoot started off with me, Michael Anthony, and Chad Smith jamming at my club, Cabo Wabo, in Mexico. Then people started asking us when we were going to tour, make a record, etc. So I said if we're going to do this properly then we're going to have to get a guitarist, so let's talk to Joe Satriani. As far as I'm concerned he's the best guitarist in the world." Hagar, Anthony and Satriani had previously collaborated in 2002 under the name Planet Us. The band also appeared in an episode of Aqua Teen Hunger Force.

Bassist Michael Anthony asserts that the name originated from initial jam sessions between Hagar, Smith, and himself: "there are three talons on a chicken's foot and there are three of us." Anthony later stated: "it was just supposed to be a bullshit name that we'd used for a while, and then [when] the rumors spread about the band, everybody used that name so we thought, 'fuck it, let's call it Chickenfoot'—it all comes down to the music anyway." Chickenfoot's second studio album, Chickenfoot III, was released on September 27, 2011.

The band's first performance together was in February 2008 at a Hagar concert in The Pearl Concert Theatre @ The Palms Casino Resort in Las Vegas. The show included a three-song set which included Led Zeppelin's "Rock and Roll", Traffic's "Dear Mr. Fantasy" and "Going Down", a song often performed by Hagar and Anthony in their other band, Los Tres Gusanos.

During breaks in Satriani's touring schedule, the four-piece gathered in Hagar's home to record demos, and ultimately recorded a full-length album at Skywalker Sound. The band's eponymous debut album, Chickenfoot, was released on June 4, 2009. On its release date, Chickenfoot performed the single "Oh Yeah!" on The Tonight Show with Conan O'Brien. Chickenfoot subsequently began touring in Europe and America.

In October 2009, Smith reconvened with the Red Hot Chili Peppers to begin work on their tenth studio album, ultimately causing Chickenfoot to enter a temporary hiatus. Despite this, the band still appeared on television once more to perform "Sexy Little Thing" and "Oh Yeah" on the November 6, 2009 broadcast of Jimmy Kimmel Live! (taped November 5).

=== Chickenfoot III (2010–2012) ===
On May 6, 2010, Chad Smith confirmed that Chickenfoot would be recording their second album in late 2010 after he completes the recording of the next Red Hot Chili Peppers album. Around the same time, Satriani confirmed that a number of songs had been written, including one called "Come Closer", which began simply as a piano and vocal number.

On September 3, 2010, Chickenfoot announced that they were preparing to record their second album. On January 21, 2011, Michael Anthony confirmed that the band would enter the studio on January 29, 2011, along with Chad Smith, who recorded the drums for the album. On March 11, 2011, Hagar confirmed that the band had been recording with Mike Fraser, a Canadian producer, engineer, and mixer. He also confirmed that they had 12 songs, and the official title for the new album is Chickenfoot III (three). Hagar said "It's the working title, but I guarantee it'll stick." Chickenfoot III was announced to be released in fall 2011 with the album cover being in 3-D. Hagar also stated the band were planning to do a third, fourth, and greatest hits albums sometime in the future.

On July 6, 2011, it was announced that the band signed a new distribution deal with eOne Music in North America. On July 8, 2011, the band posted a teaser of one of their new songs online with this message: "Attention Foot Soldiers... Get Your Boots On".

Chad Smith did not take part in the promotion or touring of Chickenfoot III due to his prior commitments to the Red Hot Chili Peppers, whose album I'm with You was released on August 30, 2011, and the album's subsequent tour. Satriani later stated that Kenny Aronoff would likely take over the drumming duties from Smith for the tour promoting the second album, and this was confirmed on August 27.

On September 27, for the release of III, the band played a live concert via webcast from TRI Studios in California. A fan Q&A followed the performance. They also played a show at the Cabo Wabo Cantina in Mexico on October 9, 2011. The 2012 "Different Devil" summer US tour started on May 4 in South Lake Tahoe, and included at least 20 dates. It was announced on August 28, 2012, that since Chickenfoot's former record label went out of business, and the debut album couldn't be found anywhere, they are re-releasing the debut album with eOne music with bonus live tracks "Lighten Up", "Big Foot", "Last Temptation", and "Something Going Wrong", recorded during the Different Devil tour of Spring 2012. On November 30, 2012, Chickenfoot's first live album LV was released as part of the limited edition box set I+III+LV paired with their first and second album in their Limited Edition releases. On December 7, 2012, LV saw a release on its own.

=== Hiatus and other projects (2013–2015) ===
In a Rolling Stone interview released in October 2014, Hagar stated that although he had enjoyed working with the group, disappointing album sales probably precluded a third Chickenfoot studio album. Satriani also has made similar comments about album sales being a factor that has prevented them from continuing quickly.

In September 2015, Joe Satriani confirmed that the band were working on a new song with possibly more to come: "I think all my complaining and foot stomping really had an effect, because it was really bothering me and I still, philosophically, just felt like there was a really big disconnect there between me and some of the other members of Chickenfoot". He went on to add "and I can happily tell you now that there is a track that is circulating through the band". There was no time line given for the release of the new music, but according to Satriani "there's hope".

=== Reunion (2016–2017) ===
The band briefly reunited for two shows on May 7 and 8, 2016 at Harrah's Showroom at South Lake Tahoe. During the show, the band debuted a song titled "Divine Termination".

Chad Smith discussed the future of Chickenfoot in a June 2016 interview with Rolling Stone. He was asked if Chickenfoot was ever going to tour again, to which he replied "We just played a few weeks ago up in Tahoe, but everyone has different things going on. Sam [Hagar] has his own thing with Mike [Anthony] and Joe [Satriani] is on his own tour. We really enjoy playing together, but with my schedule I don't see us playing too much. I would love to make some new music with those guys, but we'd have to be in the same room at the same time. I just don't know. It's up in the air. I love playing with those guys, though. It's a real treat."

Hagar shared his plans for the band in November 2017, during an appearance on the "Trunk Nation" show on SiriusXM channel Volume: "Joe and I have been talking, when he finishes his [solo] tour next June, if he has enough time and if Chad's available, about doing another Chickenfoot record. And if they can't do it, if we can't all get together, then I'm gonna do a Circle record. It's gonna be one or the other. Those are my two favorite bands in the world. And I would like to do a Circle record."

== Members ==
- Sammy Hagar – lead vocals, rhythm guitar (2008–2012, 2016)
- Michael Anthony – bass, backing vocals (2008–2012, 2016)
- Joe Satriani – lead guitar, keyboards, piano, occasional backing vocals (2008–2012, 2016)
- Chad Smith – drums, percussion (2008–2011, 2016)

=== Touring members ===
- Kenny Aronoff – drums, percussion, backing vocals (2011–2012)

== Discography ==
=== Studio albums ===
Title	Album details	Peak chart positions										Sales	Certifications
Title	Album details	US	AUS	AUT	CAN	FIN	FRA	NL	SWE	SWI	UK	Sales	Certifications
Chickenfoot	Released: June 5, 2009; Label: Redline Entertainment; Formats: CD, LP, music download	4	50	36	5	36	67	25	36	11	23	US: 560,000	RIAA: Gold; MC: Gold
Chickenfoot III	Released: September 27, 2011; Label: eOne Music; Formats: CD, LP, music download	9	46	11	19	41	81	36	45	12	102	US: 42,000	
"—" denotes releases that did not chart

=== Compilations ===
Title	Album details	Peak chart positions
Title	Album details	US
Best + Live	Released: March 10, 2017; Label: eOne Music; Formats: CD, music download	186

=== Live albums ===
Title	Album details
LV	Released: December 7, 2012; Label: Edel; Formats: CD, LP, music download

=== Box sets ===
Title	Details
I+III+LV	Released: November 30, 2012; Label: Edel; Formats: CD + DVD; contains Chickenfoot (Limited Edition), III (Limited Edition with DVD), LV

=== Singles ===
Year	Single	US Main.	Album
2009	"Oh Yeah"	21	Chickenfoot
2009	"Soap on a Rope"	—	Chickenfoot
2009	"Sexy Little Thing"	40	Chickenfoot
2010	"Get It Up"	—	Chickenfoot
2010	"My Kinda Girl"	—	Chickenfoot
2011	"Big Foot"	32	Chickenfoot III
2011	"Three and a Half Letters"	—	Chickenfoot III
2012	"Different Devil"	—	Chickenfoot III
2013	"Something Going Wrong"	—	LV
2017	"Divine Termination"	—	Best + Live
"—" denotes releases that did not chart

== Music videos ==
Year	Video	Director
2009	"Oh Yeah"	Jon Luini & Arthur Rosato
2009	"Soap on a Rope"	Jon Luini & Arthur Rosato
2009	"Sexy Little Thing"	Meat & Potatoes
2010	"Get It Up"	Darin Bristow (see TV animation credits as producer and music video work with Canadian rock artists Kim Mitchell and Big Sugar )
2010	"My Kind of Girl"	Meat & Potatoes
2011	"Big Foot"	Zan Passante & Jon Hill
2011	"Three and a Half Letters"	Arthur Rosato
2017	"Divine Termination"	Jon Luini & Arthur Rosato

=== Video ===
Year	Title
2009	Chickenfoot Deluxe Limited Edition CD+DVD
2010	Get Your Buzz On Live
