= Sammy Hagar and the Circle =

Rock supergroup

- Also known as: The Circle
- Origin: Miami, Florida, U.S.
- Genres: Hard rock; heavy metal; blues rock
- Years active: 2014–2024
- Labels: Mailboat Records; BMG
- Members: Sammy Hagar; Michael Anthony; Vic Johnson; Jason Bonham (Former)

Sammy Hagar and the Circle (simply known as The Circle) is a rock supergroup band originally formed in Miami in 2014, consisting of vocalist Sammy Hagar (Montrose and Van Halen), bassist Michael Anthony (Van Halen), drummer Jason Bonham, and guitarist Vic Johnson. The group released a live album called At Your Service on 19 May 2015, and a live DVD of the same name in December of that same year.

The band released a new album of original material, Space Between, on 10 May 2019. Hagar debuted one of the new songs at his High Tide Beach Party & Car Show in 2018. The first single from Space Between, "Trust Fund Baby", was released on 28 January 2019.

On 30 September 2022 the band released Crazy Times featuring "Pump It Up", the first single and video.

== Personnel ==
- Sammy Hagar – lead vocals, rhythm guitar
- Vic Johnson – lead guitar, backing vocals
- Michael Anthony – bass, backing vocals
- Jason Bonham – drums, percussion, backing vocals

== Discography ==
Studio albums

- Space Between (2019)
- Lockdown 2020 (2021)
- Crazy Times (2022)

Live albums

- At Your Service (2015)
