= For Unlawful Carnal Knowledge =

Studio album by Van Halen
- Released: June 17, 1991
- Recorded: March 1990 – April 1991
- Studios: 5150 Studios, Studio City, California
- Genre: Hard rock
- Length: 52:06
- Label: Warner Bros.
- Producers: Andy Johns; Ted Templeman; Van Halen

Van Halen chronology
OU812 (1988)	For Unlawful Carnal Knowledge (1991)	Live: Right Here, Right Now (1993)

Singles from For Unlawful Carnal Knowledge
- 1. "Poundcake" Released: June 10, 1991; 2. "Runaround" Released: June 1991; 3. "Top of the World" Released: September 1991; 4. "Right Now" Released: February 1992

For Unlawful Carnal Knowledge (often abbreviated as F.U.C.K.) is the ninth studio album by American rock band Van Halen. It was released on June 17, 1991, on Warner Bros. Records and is the third to feature vocalist Sammy Hagar. It debuted at number 1 on the Billboard 200 album chart and maintained the position for three consecutive weeks.

The album marked the first time the band had Ted Templeman working in a producer capacity since 1984, when David Lee Roth was still lead singer. He had, however, assisted in determining the track sequencing for the 1986 effort 5150.

The album was remastered by Donn Landee and released on October 6, 2023, as part of The Collection II; the four studio albums with Hagar, plus an extra disc of eight rarities from this era.

A 2 LP, 2 CD, Blu-ray Expanded Edition of the album was released on July 12, 2024. It included a previously unreleased instrumental version of "The Dream Is Over" as well as Guitar and Organ Versions of the single mix of "Right Now." It also included unreleased concert footage from the band's December 4, 1991, performance in Dallas, Texas captured during the For Unlawful Carnal Knowledge Tour.

== Title ==
The album's title came from lead singer Sammy Hagar, who wanted to push the issue of censorship by naming Van Halen's album with a vulgarity, stating, "That's when censorship was a big issue. I wanted to name the album just Fuck." Hagar eventually backed away from the outright vulgarity after he was told by his friend, former world lightweight boxing champion Ray "Boom Boom" Mancini, that the word "fuck" was an acronym for the phrase "for unlawful carnal knowledge" (though this is a false etymology). Their tour promoting the album was unofficially named F.U.C.K. 'n' Live. Prior to recording, the term "for unlawful carnal knowledge" was used by the band Coven as a track on their album Witchcraft Destroys Minds & Reaps Souls in 1969.

== Recording ==
Van Halen started work on the album in March 1990 and finished in April 1991, two months before its release. The album itself was marketed as the "return" to Van Halen's hard rock roots, with most songs being guitar driven, and the synth sounds being replaced by pianos. The band also reconciled with producer Ted Templeman, who produced earlier Van Halen albums to return to work on the album. According to Eddie Van Halen, this happened because Hagar did not want to work with Andy Johns and Templeman let him "get away with everything." The year-long production led to the 'labored' sound.

This was the first album that Eddie recorded without his trademark Marshall Super Lead serving as the primary amplifier. The Marshall was fading so he went with his 1989 Soldano SLO-100 to record the album primarily, though the Marshall was used sparingly. A prototype for what would become the Peavey 5150 series of custom amplifiers was also used. Peavey's release of the 5150 series coincided with the release of the album.

"Poundcake" featured the sound of a battery-operated Makita power drill, which Eddie held to the pickups of his guitar and revved, creating the intro.

The instrumental "316" is named for the March 16, 1991, birthday of Eddie's son Wolfgang, who later went on to be Van Halen's last bass player, although the song predates his birth (as part of it was used by Eddie at the beginning of his guitar solo on tour, as seen on Live Without a Net, and was originally written for 5150). On Wolfgang's 25th birthday on March 16, 2016, his mother Valerie Bertinelli posted a photo on her Facebook page of her and Eddie during her pregnancy with the caption "Ed playing 316 on my growing tummy, before he knew he would call it 316" Eddie can be seen in the photo playing an acoustic guitar on top of Bertinelli's pregnant belly.

The song "Top of the World" features a riff that was first heard on a studio recording during the outro of the 1984-era hit "Jump". However on bootleg and official (but unreleased) recordings of Van Halen concerts during the original David Lee Roth era, the riff can sometimes be heard being played at the end of "Dance The Night Away", the most notable being at the end of 1983 Us Festival performance of the song. "Top of the World" was played directly after "Jump" on the For Unlawful Carnal Knowledge Tour and appears immediately after it on both Live: Right Here, Right Now (a live album recorded on that tour) and the Best of Both Worlds compilation. "Top of the World" is also notable for featuring Steve Lukather of Toto, who performs backing vocals on the song.

== Critical reception ==
Professional ratings
Review scores
Source	Rating
AllMusic	2.5/5 stars
Entertainment Weekly	C
Christgau's Consumer Guide	(dud)
Rolling Stone	2/5 stars
Ultimate Guitar	4.5/5 stars

Rolling Stone's John Milward rated the album two out of five stars, explaining that it "is so stuffed with zigzagging guitars and blustery vocals that it almost forgets to rock. Eddie Van Halen, who probably has more guitars than teeth, upends such a tackle box of hooks that they only start to surface after repeated listenings. Tasteful simplicity, which is never really simple at all, would have proved a better course to follow." He concluded that the guitars "are busier, the beats are heavier, and the fun is fleeting. Van Halen has chops to burn, but For Unlawful Carnal Knowledge, like its lumbering opening track and first single, 'Poundcake', is stale."

Gina Arnold of Entertainment Weekly gave the album a C and said, "It would be nice to believe that the acronym formed by the title of Van Halen's new, top-charting album was intended as a covert blow against censorship in America. Unfortunately, it's far more likely that the punny name merely indicates VH's love of the kind of bathroom talk that third graders think is funny. [...] For Unlawful Carnal Knowledge doesn't contain even one mind-numbingly catchy melody. Only 'Top of the World' and 'The Dream Is Over' come close to working up a truly fist-thrusting chorus, and the gist of the latter—'dream another dream, this dream is over'—may well be advice that Van Halen and their fans ought to take to heart."

In his Consumer Guide, Robert Christgau gave the album a "dud" rating.

A retrospective review by AllMusic's Stephen Thomas Erlewine was mixed. He stated that the title "indicates the true nature of For Unlawful Carnal Knowledge [...] Backing away from the diversity of OU812, the band turns in some of the most basic, straightforward rock & roll of its career." However, he also stated that it was "undeniable that [Sammy Hagar's] limited vocal power had a great deal to do with the obvious nature of most of this music." He concluded that, even though the band continued to be tight and professional, the songwriting "is, by and large, undistinguished, with the anthemic 'Right Now' standing out as the most memorable song of the batch, mainly because of its incessant chorus."

== Track listing ==
All tracks are written by Edward Van Halen, Michael Anthony, Sammy Hagar and Alex Van Halen.

For Unlawful Carnal Knowledge track listing
No.	Title	Length
1.	"Poundcake"	5:21
2.	"Judgement Day"	4:38
3.	"Spanked"	4:53
4.	"Runaround"	4:20
5.	"Pleasure Dome"	6:58
6.	"In 'n' Out"	6:04
7.	"Man on a Mission"	5:03
8.	"The Dream Is Over"	3:59
9.	"Right Now"	5:21
10.	"316" (instrumental)	1:29
11.	"Top of the World"	3:54
Total length:		52:06

== Personnel ==
Van Halen

- Sammy Hagar – vocals, rhythm guitar
- Edward Van Halen – lead guitar, keyboards, backing vocals, electric drill on "Poundcake"
- Michael Anthony – bass, backing vocals
- Alex Van Halen – drums, percussion, backing vocals

Additional personnel

- Steve Lukather – backing vocals on "Top of the World"

Production

- Andy Johns – producer, engineer, mixing
- Jeri Heiden – art direction
- Lee Herschberg – engineer
- Michael Scott – engineer, mixing
- David Seltzer – photography
- Ted Templeman – producer, mixing
- Van Halen – producers
- Glen Wexler – photography
- Donn Landee – remastering (2023)

== Charts ==
=== Weekly charts ===
Chart (1991–1992)	Peak position
Australian Albums (ARIA)	5
Austrian Albums (Ö3 Austria)	21
Canada Top Albums/CDs (RPM)	4
Dutch Albums (Album Top 100)	24
Finnish Albums (The Official Finnish Charts)	7
German Albums (Offizielle Top 100)	6
Japanese Albums (Oricon)	11
New Zealand Albums (RMNZ)	25
Swedish Albums (Sverigetopplistan)	17
Swiss Albums (Schweizer Hitparade)	11
UK Albums (Official Charts)	12
US Billboard 200	1

Chart (2024)	Peak position
Hungarian Physical Albums (MAHASZ)	18

=== Year-end charts ===
Chart (1991)	Position
German Albums (Offizielle Top 100)	78
US Billboard 200	37

Chart (1992)	Position
US Billboard 200	75

== Certifications ==
Region	Certification	Certified units/sales
Canada (Music Canada)	Platinum	100,000^{^}
Japan (RIAJ)	Gold	100,000^{^}
United Kingdom (BPI)	Silver	60,000^{^}
United States (RIAA)	3× Platinum	3,000,000^{^}
^{^} Shipments figures based on certification alone.

== Awards ==
Grammy Award

Year	Nominated work	Category	Result
1991	For Unlawful Carnal Knowledge	Best Hard Rock Performance	Won
