= Chickenfoot (album) =

Studio album by Chickenfoot
- Released: June 5, 2009
- Recorded: January–February 2009
- Studios: Skywalker Sound in Marin County, California
- Genres: Hard rock, blues rock, heavy metal
- Length: 57:47
- Labels: Redline, EAR Music (Europe), WHD Entertainment (Japan)
- Producers: Andy Johns, Chickenfoot

Chickenfoot chronology
Chickenfoot (2009)	Chickenfoot III (2011)

Singles from Chickenfoot
- 1. "Oh Yeah" Released: April 13, 2009; 2. "Soap on a Rope" Released: August 18, 2009; 3. "Sexy Little Thing" Released: October 21, 2009

Sammy Hagar chronology
Cosmic Universal Fashion (2008)	Chickenfoot (2009)	Chickenfoot III (2011)

Chickenfoot is the debut studio album by the American hard rock band of the same name, released on June 5, 2009 in Europe and the US. The first pressing of the album was packaged with exclusive "heat sensitive" artwork that revealed an image when touched or exposed to heat above 84 degrees Fahrenheit.

On March 20, 2009, the band released two songs, "Soap on a Rope" and "Down the Drain" on their official website. The band's first single, "Oh Yeah", was released to radio stations nationwide, as well as on their official website, on April 13, 2009.

On October 7, 2009, the official Chickenfoot website revealed that the album had been certified Gold.

A deluxe edition with a DVD was released in the UK on October 26, 2009 and the US, exclusively at Best Buy stores, on November 1, 2009.

On October 16, 2012 the album was re-released as a double disc with 5 bonus tracks on the second disc. The reissue was in reaction to the album. Sing discontinued after the original record company went out of business.

== Recording ==
Regarding producer Andy Johns, bassist Michael Anthony states:

He is a great engineer and a great producer. He really was like the fifth member of the band. He was out in the studio with us, making suggestions and everything. He knew when we had a take. He would say, 'Play it as many times as you want, but that is the one right there.' He would go outside and have a cigarette and say, 'Let me know when you guys are through goofing around because this is the take we are using.'

Professional ratings
Review scores
Source	Rating
Billboard	(favorable)
Allmusic	2/5 stars
Entertainment Weekly	C+
Jukebox:Metal	4/5 stars
liveDaily	(favorable)
Modernguitars	(favorable)
Ultimate-Guitar	(8.7)

== Artwork ==
On current pressings of the album, the front and back covers are printed with heat sensitive ink that changes appearance above and below 84 degrees Fahrenheit (approximately 29 degrees Celsius). When below 84 degrees (29 °C) it appears only a white Chickenfoot logo (which is not printed in heat sensitive ink) on a black background. When above 84 degrees (29 °C) it is the logo with four square zones with each band member in each one.

== Track listing ==
All tracks are written by Sammy Hagar and Joe Satriani, except where noted.

No.	Title	Writer(s)	Length
1.	"Avenida Revolucion (Note: This is the song title on the album cover. On the official website the song is named "Avenida Revolution".)"		5:56
2.	"Soap on a Rope"		5:32
3.	"Sexy Little Thing"		4:14
4.	"Oh Yeah"		4:54
5.	"Runnin' Out"		3:52
6.	"Get It Up"		4:41
7.	"Down the Drain"	Hagar, Satriani, Michael Anthony, Chad Smith	6:17
8.	"My Kinda Girl"		4:32
9.	"Learning to Fall"		5:13
10.	"Turnin' Left"		5:48
11.	"Future in the Past"	Hagar, Satriani, Anthony, Smith	6:38

vinyl / iTunes / Japanese / Limited Edition / 2012 double disc re-release bonus track
No.	Title	Writer(s)	Length
12.	"Bitten by the Wolf"	Hagar, Satriani, Smith	4:24

2012 double disc re-release bonus tracks
No.	Title	Length
13.	"Lighten Up" (Live)	6:57
14.	"Big Foot" (Live)	4:21
15.	"Last Temptation" (Live)	4:09
16.	"Something's Going Wrong" (Live)	4:24

== Personnel ==
Adapted from the Chickenfoot liner notes.

=== Band ===
- Sammy Hagar – lead vocals, rhythm guitar
- Joe Satriani – lead guitar, keyboards
- Michael Anthony – bass, backing vocals
- Chad Smith – drums, percussion

=== Recording personnel ===
- Andy Johns – producer, recording
- Bob Daspit – recording
- Dann Michael Thompson – recording, recording assistant, digital editing
- Mike Fraser – recording, mixing
- Judy Kirschner – recording assistant
- John Cuniberti – recording assistant
- Jamie Durr – recording assistant
- Eric Mosher – mixing assistant, digital editing
- Andre Zweers – digital editing
- Bernie Grundman – mastering

=== Artwork ===
- Todd Gallopo – art direction and design
- Bryan Adams – photography
- Jon Luini – digital strategy and video production

== Chart positions ==
=== Weekly charts ===
Chart (2009–2011)	Peak position
Australian Albums (ARIA)	50
Austrian Albums (Ö3 Austria)	36
Belgian Albums (Ultratop Flanders)	61
Belgian Albums (Ultratop Wallonia)	88
Canadian Albums (Billboard)	5
Dutch Albums (Album Top 100)	25
French Albums (SNEP)	67
German Albums (Offizielle Top 100)	17
Italian Albums (FIMI)	45
Japanese Albums (Oricon)	29
Scottish Albums (Official Charts)	23
Swedish Albums (Sverigetopplistan)	36
Swiss Albums (Schweizer Hitparade)	11
UK Albums (OCC)	23
US Billboard 200	4
US Top Hard Rock Albums (Billboard)	1
US Independent Albums (Billboard)	1
US Top Rock Albums (Billboard)	3
US Indie Store Album Sales (Billboard)	6

=== Year-end charts ===
Chart (2009)	Position
US Billboard 200	88
US Top Rock Albums (Billboard)	25

Chart (2010)	Position
US Top Hard Rock Albums (Billboard)	39
US Top Independent Albums (Billboard)	31

== Certifications ==
Region	Certification	Certified units/sales
Canada (Music Canada)	Gold	40,000^{^}
United States (RIAA)	Gold	560,000
^{^} Shipments figures based on certification alone.
