= OU812 =

1988 studio album by Van Halen

Studio album by Van Halen
- Released: May 24, 1988
- Recorded: September 1987 – April 1988
- Studios: 5150 Studios, Studio City, California
- Genres: Hard rock; glam metal
- Length: 50:41 (CD); 46:50 (vinyl)
- Label: Warner Bros.
- Producers: Van Halen; Donn Landee

Van Halen chronology
5150 (1986)	OU812 (1988)	For Unlawful Carnal Knowledge (1991)

Singles from OU812
- 1. "Black and Blue" Released: May 1988; 2. "When It's Love" Released: June 1988; 3. "Finish What Ya Started" Released: September 1988; 4. "Feels So Good" Released: January 1989

OU812 (pronounced as "Oh You Ate One Too") is the eighth studio album by American rock band Van Halen. Released on May 24, 1988, it is the band's second album to feature vocalist Sammy Hagar. Van Halen began work on the album in September 1987 and completed it in April 1988, one month before its release.

Like its predecessor 5150, OU812 hit number 1 on the Billboard 200 chart, the second of four consecutive #1 studio albums for the band. Spurred by four Billboard Hot 100 top-40 singles ("Black and Blue", #34; "Finish What Ya Started", #13; "When It's Love", #5; and "Feels So Good", #35), the album eventually sold over 4 million copies.

The album was remastered by Donn Landee and released on October 6, 2023, as part of The Collection II; the four studio albums with Hagar, plus an extra disc of eight rarities from this era.

== Production ==
Once the 5150 tour concluded, Eddie Van Halen had some riffs he had been working on and Hagar "had a bunch of lyrics in notebooks that I had been thinking about and writing", so they decided to work on another album soon. While the album acknowledges Van Halen for writing and performing and Landee for recording, there was no production credit because according to Hagar, "the band pretty much produced the album ourselves. And we weren't producers, in the sense that we went in with an idea and told everybody what to do and took control. There just wasn't a producer." The only cover song on the album, Little Feat's "A Apolitical Blues", was coincidentally also done by former Van Halen producer Ted Templeman and Landee, to the point the engineer used the same setup to record Van Halen's version.

When Hagar was brought to the studio, Eddie showed a piano and drums demo he recorded with Alex Van Halen, which the band soon developed into the song "When It's Love". Given the musical parts were finished quicker than the lyrics, Hagar took some weeks off and travelled to his Mexican house at Cabo San Lucas to work on more songs. There he found the inspiration for the song "Cabo Wabo", which borrowed the melody of "Make It Last", a song Hagar composed for his previous band Montrose, and whose title later named Hagar's nightclub in the city. The last song to be developed was "Finish What Ya Started", which Eddie and Hagar composed one night late into the production. However, the last track to which Hagar recorded his vocals was the eventual album opener "Mine All Mine", as he felt unsure about the lyrics. The deeper metaphysical lyrics to "Mine All Mine" were rewritten seven times, with Hagar saying "it was the first time in my life I ever beat myself up, hurt myself, punished myself, practically threw things through windows, trying to write the lyrics." Although it was considered a joke song, "Source of Infection" was written about Eddie's hospitalization with dengue fever during his vacation in Australia in April 1988, celebrating his seventh wedding anniversary with Valerie Bertinelli.

The working title was Bone, which Alex hated. Hagar then decided on OU812 after seeing this on the side of a delivery truck on the freeway and finding it funny (rumors persist, though, that the title was a disguised response to the title of David Lee Roth's 1986 solo album, Eat 'Em and Smile). OU812 is seen in Cheech and Chong's Next Movie (1980) on the license plate of the car given to Cheech at the "Comedy House" when he was leaving. It was also scribbled on the cinderblock column on which is mounted the payphone that the cab drivers used in the TV sitcom Taxi (1978–1983). The album's front cover is a homage to the classic cover of With the Beatles. The cover features a black and white photo of the band member's faces partly hidden in shadows, and is also similar to that of Blue Cheer's Vincebus Eruptum (1968) and King Crimson's Red (1974). Album artwork for the back cover is Hugo Rheinhold's statuette Affe mit Schädel.

The track listing on the back cover is arranged in alphabetical order, instead of in sequence on most releases.

The album is dedicated to Eddie and Alex's father, Jan, who died on December 9, 1986, at the age of 66. The inner linings of the album include the words, "This one's for you, Pa". Jan had previously appeared playing clarinet on one track, "Big Bad Bill (Is Sweet William Now)", on Van Halen's 1982 album, Diver Down.

== Critical reception and legacy ==
Professional ratings
Review scores
Source	Rating
AllMusic	3.5/5 stars
Christgau's Record Guide: The '80s	C
Collector's Guide to Heavy Metal	6/10
Kerrang!	5/5 stars
Rolling Stone	3.5/5 stars

Reviews for OU812 were initially mixed. Robert Christgau rated the album a C in The Village Voice, which signifies "a record of clear professionalism or barely discernible inspiration, but not both." He noted that "trading Dave for Sammy sure wrecked their shot at Led Zep of the '80s--master guitarist, signature vocalist, underrated rhythm section." However, he stated: "Eddie's obsessed with technique, Roth's contemptuous of technique, rhythm section's got enough technique and no klutz genius. But Sammy . . . like wow. If I can't claim the new boy owns them [...], you can't deny he defines them." Rolling Stone's David Fricke rated the album three-and-a-half out of five stars. He said of "Source of Infection": "While Eddie Van Halen sprays you with a machine-gun succession of speed-metal-guitar arpeggios, Sammy Hagar sends out the party invitations with his usual savoir-faire — "Hey! All right! Whoo!" Alex Van Halen and Michael Anthony, of course, take him at his word, shooting into hyper-beat space before you can say, 'Jump'." He noted that "Van Halen, contrary to purist grumbling, did not wimp out when Diamond Dave hit the bricks. Nor did the band go — ugh! — pop: the 5150 ladies' choice "Why Can't This Be Love" wasn't really a ballad; it was more like Big Rock Melancholia. In fact, all the 5150-model Van Halen did was replace one mighty mouth with another and trot out some hip, new songwriting tricks." Still, he stated that "the curve balls [...] don't always hit the strike zone. "Finish What Ya Started" is an unexpected turn into wheat-field-rock country." Despite this, he concluded that "maybe Eddie and company haven't been pushing the envelope, so to speak, far enough in terms of songwriting. But "Mine All Mine" is a good teaser for the future, the slow stuff is classy radio fare, and at its best, OU812 is a veritable feast of great white rock & roll wow." Xavier Russell of Kerrang! was more enthusiastic and called OU812 "loud, rude, dirty and very much a Van Halen album".

A retrospective review from AllMusic's Stephen Thomas Erlewine was fairly positive. Erlewine stated that "when David Lee Roth fronted the band, almost everything that Van Halen did seemed easy – as big, boisterous, and raucous as an actual party – but Van Hagar makes good times seem like tough work here." Still, he stated that "the riffs are complicated, not catchy, the rhythms plod, they don't rock, and Sammy strains to inject some good times by singing too hard." However, he concluded that "if it isn't as good as Fair Warning (even if it's nearly not as much fun), it's nevertheless the best showcase of the instrumental abilities of Van Hagar." Canadian journalist Martin Popoff defined OU812 music as "cynical corporate rock" and found the album "over-produced and actually more commonplace" than its predecessor 5150, implying that "the philosophical soul and warmth" of Van Halen "evaporated when David Lee Roth packed it in."

In a music magazine interview published a few years after the release of the album, Eddie Van Halen expressed his opinion that the record was not mixed as well as he would have liked: "Sonically it was shit." Some criticism of the album noted the bass guitar parts are of a low level in the mix compared to the vocals and other instruments. There has been speculation that the thin presence of bass guitar in the mix may be related to the Van Halen brothers' rumored growing animosity towards bassist Michael Anthony. In later years, Anthony would be forced out of the band and his songwriting credits removed or altered.

The experimental band Mr. Bungle, fronted by Faith No More singer Mike Patton, named their 1989 demo tape after the album, humorously retitling it OU818. The band went on to cover several Van Halen songs live throughout their career.

== Track listing ==
All tracks are written by Eddie Van Halen, Sammy Hagar, Alex Van Halen and Michael Anthony, except for "A Apolitical Blues", which is by Lowell George.

Side one
No.	Title	Length
1.	"Mine All Mine"	5:11
2.	"When It's Love"	5:36
3.	"A.F.U. (Naturally Wired)"	4:28
4.	"Cabo Wabo"	7:04

Side two
No.	Title	Length
5.	"Source of Infection"	3:58
6.	"Feels So Good"	4:27
7.	"Finish What Ya Started"	4:20
8.	"Black and Blue"	5:24
9.	"Sucker in a 3 Piece"	5:52

CD and streaming services only
No.	Title	Length
10.	"A Apolitical Blues" (Little Feat cover)	3:50

Note

- "A Apolitical Blues" was absent from the cassette and vinyl pressings, but it was released as the B-side of the 45rpm single of “Black and Blue”, the first single released from the album.

When the album was remastered as part of the 2023 Hagar era box set The Collection II "A Apolitical Blues" was removed from the CD entirely and moved to the 'Studio Rarities' bonus disc, despite it being on the original CD release.

== Personnel ==
=== Van Halen ===
- Sammy Hagar – lead vocals, rhythm guitar
- Eddie Van Halen – lead & rhythm guitars, keyboards, backing vocals
- Michael Anthony – bass, backing vocals
- Alex Van Halen – drums, percussion

=== Production ===
- Donn Landee – producer, engineer, remastering (2023)
- Van Halen – producers
- Ken Deane – assistant engineer
- Bobby Hata – mastering (1988)
- Jeri Heiden – art direction
- Maura P. McLaughlin – art direction
- Eika Aoshima – photography
- Stuart Watson – photography

== Charts ==
=== Weekly charts ===
Chart (1988–1989)	Peak position
Australian Albums (ARIA)	9
Austrian Albums (Ö3 Austria)	21
Canada Top Albums/CDs (RPM)	1
Dutch Albums (Album Top 100)	22
Finnish Albums (The Official Finnish Charts)	1
German Albums (Offizielle Top 100)	12
Japanese Albums (Oricon)	7
Norwegian Albums (VG-lista)	5
Swedish Albums (Sverigetopplistan)	9
Swiss Albums (Schweizer Hitparade)	9
UK Albums (Official Charts)	16
US Billboard 200	1

=== Year-end charts ===
Chart (1988)	Position
US Billboard 200	28

Chart (1989)	Position
US Billboard 200	71

== Certifications ==
Region	Certification	Certified units/sales
United Kingdom (BPI)	Silver	60,000^{^}
United States (RIAA)	4× Platinum	4,000,000^{^}
^{^} Shipments figures based on certification alone.
