= Oh Yeah (Chickenfoot song) =

"Oh Yeah!"

Single by Chickenfoot

from the album Chickenfoot
- Released: April 13, 2009
- Recorded: 2009
- Genre: Hard rock; blues rock; heavy metal
- Length: 4:54
- Label: Redline
- Songwriter(s): Sammy Hagar and Joe Satriani
- Producer(s): Andy Johns, Chickenfoot

Chickenfoot singles chronology
"Oh Yeah!" (2009)	"Soap on a Rope" (2009)

Music video
- "Oh Yeah!" on YouTube

"Oh Yeah!" is the first single and fourth track from rock band Chickenfoot's debut album Chickenfoot. It was released on 13 April 2009.

== Information ==
In a video on the band's website, Joe Satriani said it was "the typical Chickenfoot arrangement where the song starts out with a riff and the band kicks in, then going on all these changes and when the main riff starts again, the listeners have forgotten it because of the musical journey". He also told that it got started very simple with him and Sammy talking about old blues songs and artists, and that it would be great if they could fuse what they did naturally as a band with old blues songwriting.

== Music video ==
The music video for the single premiered at YouTube on June 11, 2009. The video shows the band performing on a scene and in a studio. There are also shots of the band playing at a basketball court. Satriani joked that the video would win many awards as "best barbecue video".

== Track listing ==
1. "Oh Yeah!" (radio edit) -4:13
2. "Get It Up" - 4:42
3. "Learning to Fall" - 5:14

== Chart positions ==
Chart (2009)	Peak position
U.S. Billboard Hot Mainstream Rock Tracks	21
