= 5150 Studios =

Van Halen family recording studio in Los Angeles, California

Studios 5150

General information
- Type: Recording studio
- Location: 3371 Coldwater Canyon Avenue; Studio City, Los Angeles, California, U.S.
- Owner: Wolfgang Van Halen

5150 Studios is Wolfgang Van Halen's recording studio in the Studio City neighborhood of Los Angeles. The studio was built by his late father Eddie Van Halen and is located at 3371 Coldwater Canyon Avenue in Studio City. It was built so Eddie Van Halen could have more control over the recording process than he had in the past. Every Van Halen album from 1984 onwards was recorded at 5150. They took the name for the studio (as well as the band's seventh album, 5150) from Section 5150 (almost always pronounced "fifty-one-fifty") of the California Welfare & Institutions Code, which allows a qualified officer or clinician to place a person under an involuntary psychiatric hold if the person is, "as a result of mental disorder, a danger to others, or to himself or herself, or gravely disabled."

The studio is now used by Eddie's son Wolfgang Van Halen who used it on all three Mammoth albums and plans to continue using it in the future.

== History of studio 5150 ==
=== Beginnings (1983–1989) ===
In 1983, Eddie Van Halen built the studio next to his home with then wife Valerie Bertinelli. He named it "5150" after the police code overheard by producer/engineer Donn Landee one night on his police scanner.

Designed by Landee, the beta version of 5150 Studios was a high-ceilinged sixteen-track studio suitable for recording, overdubbing, and simple mixing, if needed. The recording room was roughly 600 square feet (56 m^{2}), sound insulated with fiberglass and rubber, with a booth on the north end.

The construction on Van Halen's property was passed off to city inspectors as a racquetball court, disregarding the soundproof walls with cinder blocks filled with concrete. A challenge arose in the form of a powerful AM sports radio station broadcasting a few miles away. To prevent Van Halen picking up boxing fights and football games through his guitar wireless units, engineers wrapped a layer of grounded chicken-wire fencing around the studio, turning it into a Faraday cage.

=== Remodeling and beyond (1989–present) ===
Between February 1989 (after the OU812 Tour ended) and March 1990 (before starting work on For Unlawful Carnal Knowledge), Van Halen remodeled the studio, doubling its size, replacing the main mixing board, and at the end of the recording floor, adding an isolated drum room for his brother Alex. When he was finished, it also featured a small arcade for video games and pinball machines.

The studio met with controversy as the Hollywood Association of Recording Professionals had been cracking down on home studios in the Los Angeles area, claiming owners were renting them out and hurting traditional recording studios. However, Van Halen insisted it was only for himself to make music. Because of his testimony, he was given the proper zoning variance to legally make music at his house.

In 1999, Van Halen remodeled the studio once again, by adding a 72-input analog mixing desk and a Mellotron.
