= Michael Anthony (musician) =

American bassist (born 1954)

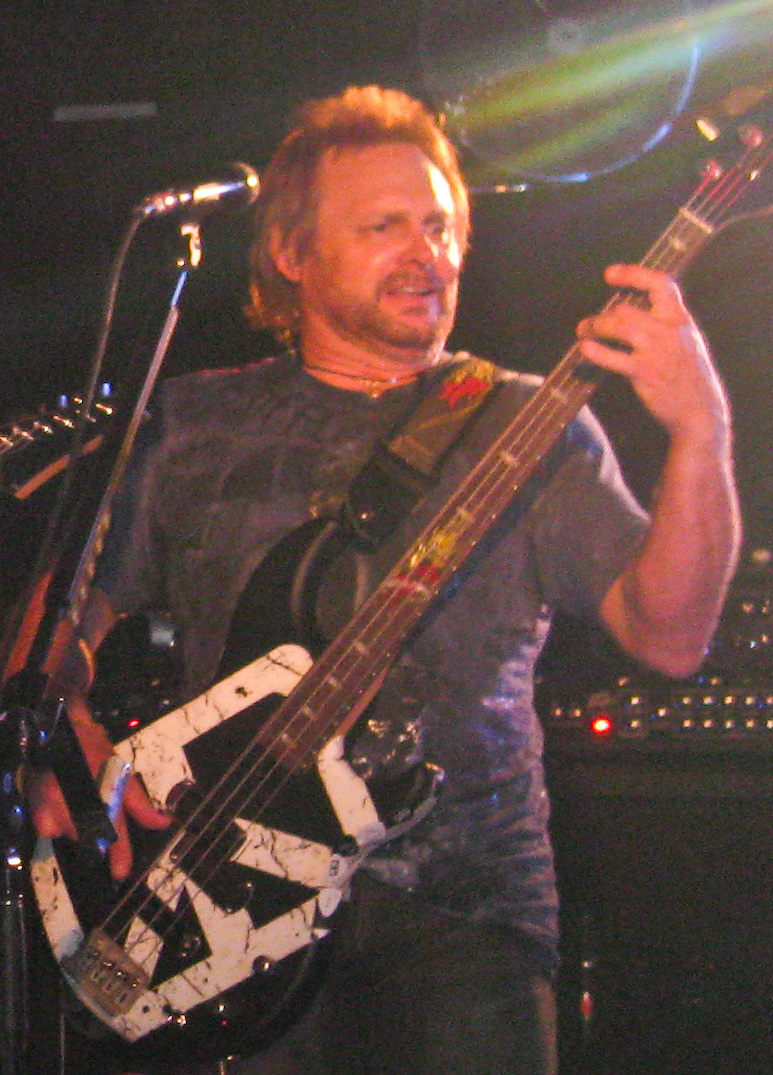
- Anthony with Chickenfoot in 2009

Background information
- Born: Michael Anthony Sobolewski; June 20, 1954 (age 72); Chicago, Illinois, U.S.
- Genres: Hard rock; heavy metal; glam metal
- Occupation: Musician
- Instrument: Bass guitar
- Years active: 1967–present
- Member of: Sammy Hagar and the Circle
- Formerly of: Van Halen; Chickenfoot; Planet Us

Michael Anthony Sobolewski (born June 20, 1954) is an American musician who was the bassist and backing vocalist for the hard rock band Van Halen from 1974 to 2006. He performed on Van Halen's first 11 albums and was their longest-tenured bassist. Since his ousting in 2006, Anthony has continued to collaborate with fellow former Van Halen bandmate Sammy Hagar in the supergroups Chickenfoot, Sammy Hagar and the Circle, and on solo Hagar tours. He also markets a line of hot sauces named Mad Anthony and related products. Anthony was inducted to the Rock and Roll Hall of Fame as a member of Van Halen in 2007.

== Early life ==
Anthony got his interest in music from his trumpeter father, and played the same instrument in his youth.

Anthony was born and partly raised in Chicago on June 20, 1954. He is of Polish descent. The family moved to California twice in Anthony's early years, settling in 1966 in Arcadia, next to Pasadena, home to his future Van Halen bandmates Alex and Edward Van Halen. From 1967 to 1969, Anthony attended Dana Junior High School, where he played in the marching band. He ran track in junior high and also showed promise in baseball, as a catcher, but by the time he started high school he had ceased doing athletics to concentrate on music.

Anthony graduated from Arcadia High in 1972.

== Music career ==
=== (1967–1974) Early musical endeavors ===
Anthony took an interest in guitar as a teenager, but picked up the bass instead since most of his other friends already played guitar or drums. Anthony's friend Mike Hershey gave him a Fender Mustang electric guitar that Anthony converted by removing the two highest strings and playing it as a bass guitar. Eventually, his father bought him a Victoria copy of a Fender Precision Bass and a Gibson amplifier. Anthony mostly modelled his bass playing after Jack Bruce of Cream, but also admired Led Zeppelin's John Paul Jones and Harvey Brooks of Electric Flag. His first band was called Poverty's Children. Other bands he played in included Black Opal, Balls, and Snake. Although Anthony is naturally left-handed, he plays right-handed.

Snake, a three-piece group featuring Anthony on lead vocals and bass guitar, was the last band in which Anthony played before joining Van Halen. Snake played covers of ZZ Top, Lynyrd Skynyrd, and Foghat, along with some original songs. They played several of the same types of gigs as did the Van Halen brothers' band Mammoth. Snake once opened for Mammoth during a show at Pasadena High School. Mammoth's PA failed that night, so Anthony lent them Snake's PA.

Anthony enrolled at Pasadena City College, where he majored in music and met Eddie Van Halen, who also took classes there. When bass player Mark Stone parted ways with Mammoth, the Van Halens auditioned Anthony as a replacement. Anthony was impressed by their skill during subsequent jam sessions even though he had heard the brothers play before. After the session, the Van Halen brothers asked Anthony to join their band. One story claims that he first consulted Snake guitarist Tony Caggiano, who advised Anthony to join up with the guitar prodigy and his brother. However, according to Anthony's web site, he immediately accepted. This has become the accepted version of events.

Anthony had planned to attend college in Santa Barbara after he graduated from Pasadena City College, but dropped out of PCC just before he earned enough credits for a degree so that he could devote all his time to Van Halen.

=== (1974–2006) Van Halen ===
In 1974, Eddie Van Halen, Alex Van Halen, David Lee Roth, and Anthony changed the band’s name from Mammoth, which was in use by another local band, to Van Halen. For several years, they played dates in the Los Angeles and West Hollywood club scene. After cutting a 29-track demo produced by Kiss's Gene Simmons, Van Halen was signed to Warner Bros. in 1977. They released their self-titled debut album on February 10, 1978. Anthony was a 20% member (manager Noel Monk being the fifth) of all debts and profits, including merchandise, until midway through the 1984 tour, when tensions rose to the point that Roth and the Van Halen brothers insisted that he sign away all future songwriting credit and royalties, starting with the current 1984 LP. Noel Monk later wrote of the event, "If I were Mike, I would have told them to 'fuck off' and not played that night, to show them my worth. Instead Mike didn't say a word and signed away millions of dollars, as the three stood over him, lying on the floor."

The band released 11 studio albums from 1978 through 1998, a live album in 1993, and two greatest-hits compilations during Anthony's tenure with the band.

Anthony produced a 1988 demo for his brother (Robert Lee Sobolewski) Bobby Leigh's band Asylum Suite, which was formed in 1984 and featured singer Michael Thomas Fiore.

=== (1996–2003) Diminishing role with Van Halen and side projects ===
As early as 1996, rumors periodically surfaced that Anthony had been fired from Van Halen, despite claims to the contrary. Anthony continued working with the band although the rumors persisted until his actual departure following the 2004 reunion tour with Hagar.

Anthony's involvement in recording the 1998 album Van Halen III was dramatically less than previous albums. Anthony played bass on three songs, with Eddie playing the bass parts for the six other songs that featured bass. Anthony is credited as a songwriter for the album along with the rest of the band. Anthony performed with the band for the 1998 tour, and was credited on messages from the band thereafter. He participated in the band's three reunion efforts with David Lee Roth in 1996, 2000 and 2001 (with the latter resulting in early versions of A Different Kind of Truth tracks). Anthony's name was also credited in a few band newsletters and appeared in band interviews during this time.

Anthony began periodic appearances with Sammy Hagar during his solo tours. He usually played as part of both the Waboritas and Los Tres Gusanos, two of Hagar's bands. During 2002's Roth/Hagar tour (otherwise known as the "Sans Halen" or "Sam and Dave" tour), both Anthony and ex-Van Halen vocalist Gary Cherone made guest appearances at concerts, sometimes together.

In 2002, Anthony, Hagar, Neal Schon, Deen Castronovo, and Joe Satriani formed the supergroup Planet Us and Anthony began making more frequent performances at Hagar concerts. Planet Us recorded two songs, including "Psycho Vertigo", which was intended for the original Spider-Man soundtrack but ultimately did not make the album. That and the other Planet Us song written for the band, "Peephole", were later released on the 2008 Hagar solo album Cosmic Universal Fashion.

=== (2003–2005) Van Halen reunion ===
Initially when Eddie and Alex asked Hagar to rejoin at the end of 2003 for a 2004 tour, the plan was to not invite Anthony back. Hagar, however, refused to perform if Anthony did not rejoin, and Anthony agreed to play but on a reduced royalties contract. The contract drawn up was for the duration of the tour only.

In 2004, Van Halen released the compilation album The Best of Both Worlds which included three new songs. Anthony did not participate in the writing of nor did he play bass on the new songs and was not credited on the album for the new material, although he did sing backup vocals on all of them.

Anthony now states in media interviews that he has not spoken to the Van Halen brothers since the 2004 tour, except to Alex at the funeral of Van Halen drum tech Greg Emerson. He has also speculated that since the brothers were not pleased with Hagar's commercial ventures such as the Cabo Wabo product line, their similar displeasure with Anthony's hot sauce brand may have caused the rift that ultimately separated Hagar and Anthony from the band.

=== (2006–present) Departure from Van Halen, continued collaboration with Sammy Hagar ===
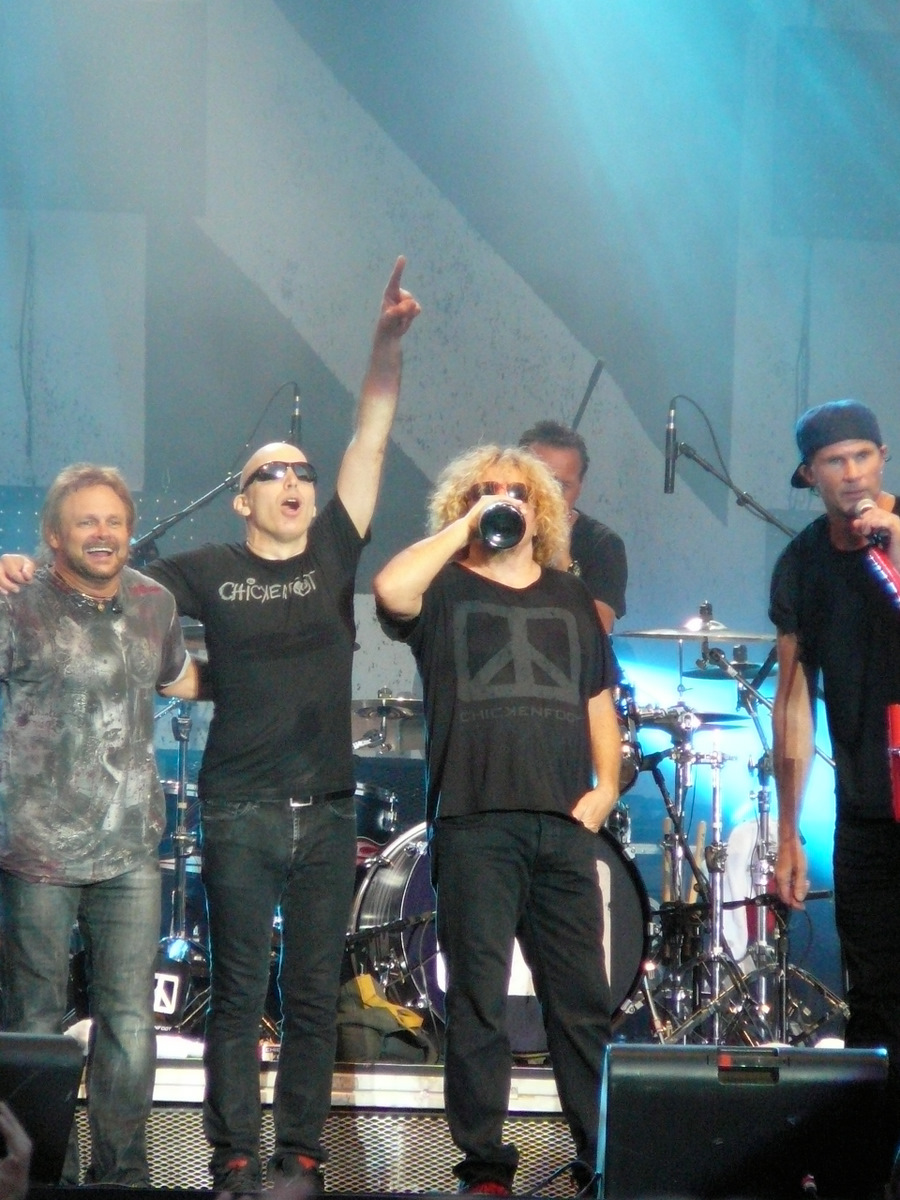
Anthony (left) with Chickenfoot in 2009

Anthony spent the summer of 2006 touring as a member of the Other Half during a segment of the Sammy Hagar and the Waboritas tour. The Other Half featured Anthony and Hagar performing classic Van Halen songs from both the Roth and Hagar periods.

On September 8, 2006, Eddie Van Halen announced that his son Wolfgang was replacing Anthony as Van Halen's bass player. On February 2, 2007, Van Halen announced that they were reuniting for a tour with original vocalist David Lee Roth. Their tour began on September 27, 2007. Anthony commented that he heard about his replacement "on the Internet" and added, "I'm a little miffed that they're calling it a Van Halen reunion. If I was dead and they needed someone to play, that's one thing, but to me this is not a reunion." At the tour press conference David Lee Roth stated, "This is not a reunion, this is a revision."

Anthony joined Hagar on live national television on February 25, 2007, during a pre-race performance for the California NASCAR race on Fox television. Anthony jumped onstage and joined Hagar during a performance of "I Can't Drive 55."

Anthony and Hagar were the only members, former or current, to appear at Van Halen's induction into the Rock and Roll Hall of Fame on March 12, 2007. Eddie Van Halen was in rehab at the time, and Alex Van Halen and David Lee Roth declined to appear.

Anthony is a founding member, bassist and backing vocalist for the band Chickenfoot with Sammy Hagar, Red Hot Chili Peppers drummer Chad Smith and guitarist Joe Satriani. The band released their first studio album in Europe on June 5, 2009, followed by the North American release on June 9. Chickenfoot released their sophomore effort, Chickenfoot III, on September 27, 2011.

Anthony is a member of Sammy Hagar and the Circle, a supergroup that formed in 2014 and features Hagar as well as guitarist Vic Johnson and drummer Jason Bonham.

From 2023 until 2026, Anthony, along with fellow ex–Van Halen member Sammy Hagar organized the Best of All Worlds tour series, a tribute pertaining to Van Halen's 1986–1995 period. Guitarist Joe Satriani and drummer Jason Bonham, later Kenny Aronoff, joined Anthony and Hagar for the tours.

== Jack Daniel's bass ==
At the height of Van Halen’s popularity in the 1980s, Anthony coordinated with his bass tech, Kevin "Dugie" Dugan, to commission master luthier James Tyler to create a bass guitar based on the Jack Daniel's logo. Dugan secured permission from the company with a promise not to make more than three such basses. The first version of the Jack Daniel's bass made its initial appearance in the "Panama" video in April 1984; it is now displayed in the Rock and Roll Hall of Fame. The second version is in Anthony's private storage and the third is still occasionally used by Anthony in live performances.

== Commercial ventures ==
Anthony maintains a personal website titled "Mad Anthony's Cafe" where he markets and sells a number of signature products including hot sauce, BBQ sauce, and hot mustard. His line of commercial foods is the result of a collaboration with a San Diego, California, restaurant noted for its hot sauces. His hot sauce brand, "Mad Anthony," has been described by local news and on the Food Network as "high-end" due to the quality of its ingredients and manufacturing process. The site also provides information on Anthony's Schecter Guitar Research bass guitar series. Chickenfoot bandmate Sammy Hagar carries the bassist's hot sauces at his Sammy's Beach Bar & Grill locations.

== Personal life ==
Anthony met Sue Hendry when both attended Arcadia High School. They married in 1981. They have two daughters. Anthony and his family reside in Newport Beach, California. He can be seen during televised car shows, often being interviewed regarding his love and knowledge for classic motorcycles and cars.

Anthony mostly stayed on the sidelines of the rock-star "party hard" lifestyle, though he was often seen and photographed with a cigarette and a Jack Daniel's (whiskey logo) bass guitar.

== Discography ==
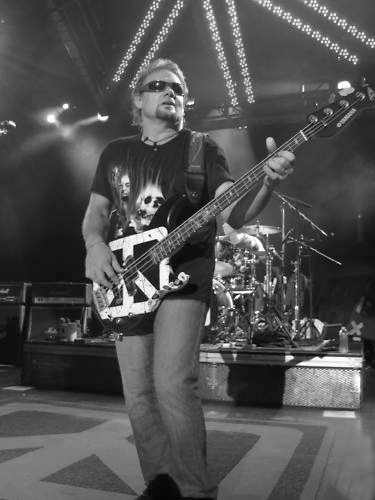
Anthony in 2013

=== with Van Halen ===
- Van Halen (1978)
- Van Halen II (1979)
- Women and Children First (1980)
- Fair Warning (1981)
- Diver Down (1982)
- 1984 (1984)
- 5150 (1986)
- OU812 (1988)
- For Unlawful Carnal Knowledge (1991)
- Balance (1995)
- Best Of Volume 1 (1996)
- Van Halen III (1998)
- Best Of Both Worlds (2004)

=== with Chickenfoot ===
- Chickenfoot (2009)
- Chickenfoot III (2011)

=== with the Circle ===
- At Your Service (2015)
- Space Between (2019)
- Lockdown 2020 (2021)
- Crazy Times (2022)
