= Josh Groban discography =

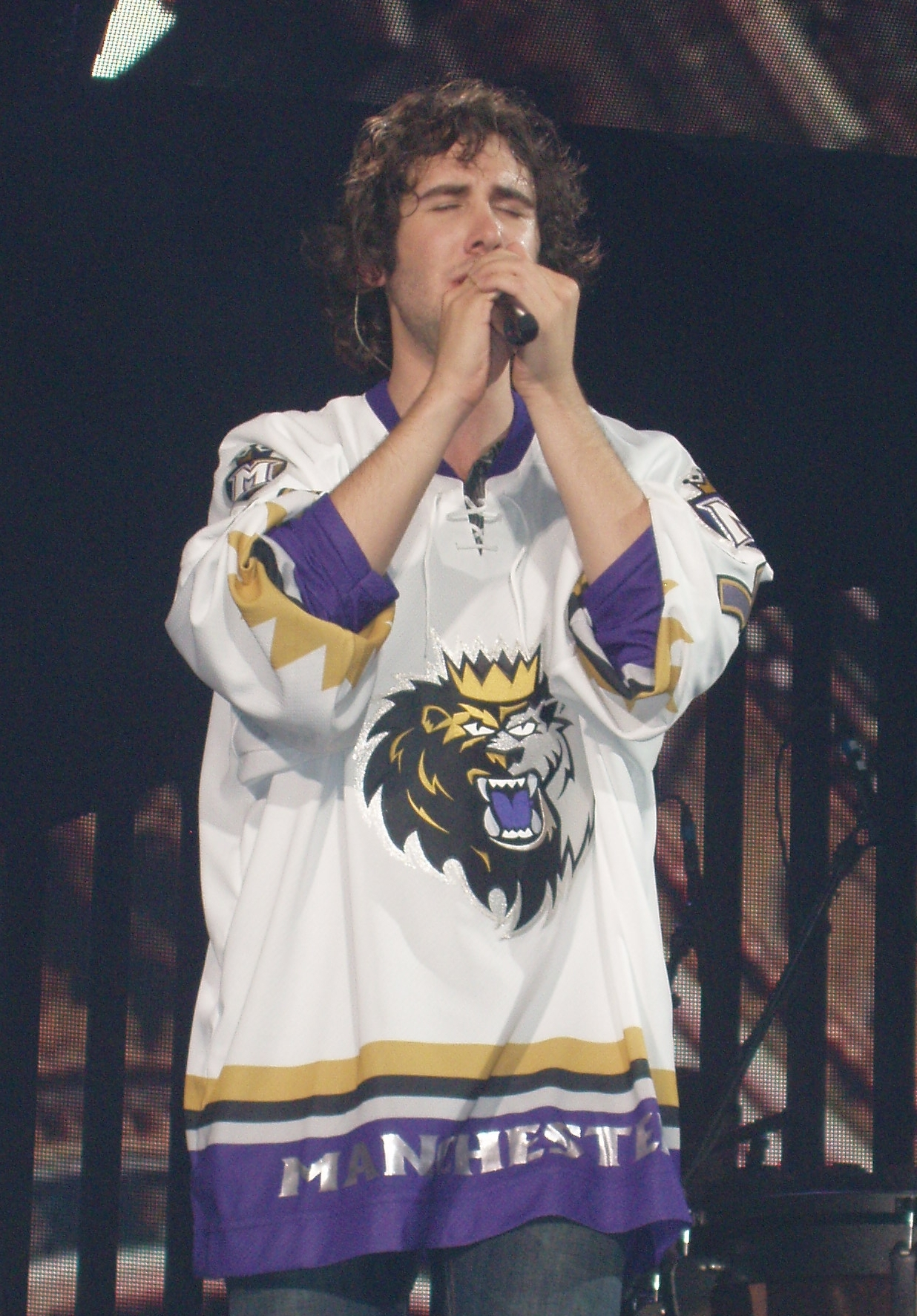
- Josh Groban (2007)
- Studio albums: 10
- Live albums: 4
- Compilation albums: 3
- Singles: 34
- Music videos: 17

American singer Josh Groban has released ten studio albums, four live albums, and 34 singles. Throughout his career, he has sold over 35 million records worldwide, making him one of the biggest stars in the history of classical crossover. Groban ranks as Billboard's 14th top-selling artist of the 2000s with more than 20 million units sold in the U.S. alone. According to RIAA, he has sold 20.5 million certified album units in the US while "Noel" is his biggest seller being certified 6× Platinum in the country and was also the best-selling album of 2007 with almost 3.7 million sold that year. He has scored 3 No. 1 albums on Billboard 200. Closer was the best-selling classical album of the 2000s decade. Groban is also the only artist who has had two albums appear on the Top 20 Best-Selling Albums list of the past decade, according to Billboard.

== Albums ==
=== Studio albums ===
List of studio albums, with selected chart positions, certifications and sales figures
Title	Album details	Peak chart positions										Sales	Certifications
Title	Album details	US	AUS	CAN	FRA	IRE	NLD	NZ	NOR	SWE	UK	Sales	Certifications
Josh Groban	Released: November 20, 2001; Label: 143, Reprise; Format: CD, digital download, cassette	8	28	6	50	—	8	4	6	7	28	US: 5,200,000	RIAA: 4× Platinum; ARIA: Gold; BPI: Gold; MC: 4× Platinum; RIANZ: Gold
Closer	Released: November 11, 2003; Label: 143, Reprise; Format: CD, digital download, cassette	1	25	2	47	62	38	9	2	21	91	US: 6,100,000	RIAA: 6× Platinum; ARIA: Platinum; BPI: Gold; IRMA: Gold; MC: 4× Platinum; RIANZ: Gold
Awake	Released: November 7, 2006; Label: 143, Reprise; Format: CD, digital download	2	5	1	5	16	25	29	11	7	12	US: 2,300,000	RIAA: 2× Platinum; ARIA: Gold; BPI: Gold; IRMA: Gold; MC: 2× Platinum; SNEP: Gold; RIANZ: Gold
Noël	Released: October 9, 2007; Label: 143, Reprise; Format: CD, digital download	1	33	1	24	26	26	—	3	4	58	US: 6,320,000	RIAA: 6× Platinum; ARIA: Gold; GLF: Gold; MC: 6× Platinum
Illuminations	Released: November 16, 2010; Label: 143, Reprise; Format: CD, digital download	4	21	4	48	12	10	9	17	22	30	US: 945,000	RIAA: Platinum; BPI: Silver; IRMA: Gold; MC: Platinum; RIANZ: Gold
All That Echoes	Released: February 5, 2013; Label: Reprise; Format: CD, digital download	1	11	1	42	11	3	3	3	11	9		RIAA: Gold; BPI: Silver; MC: Gold
Stages	Released: April 28, 2015; Label: Reprise; Format: CD, digital download	2	2	2	13	2	5	1	22	—	1	US: 502,000; CAN: 8,700	RIAA: Gold; ARIA: Gold; BPI: Gold; MC: Gold
Bridges	Released: September 21, 2018; Label: Reprise; Format: CD, digital download, streaming	2	14	18	—	14	29	—	—	—	6	US: 94,000	
Harmony	Released: November 20, 2020; Label: Reprise; Format: CD, digital download, streaming	17	26	40	—	31	46	33	—	—	24		
Cinematic	Released: May 8, 2026; Label: Reprise; Format: CD, digital download, streaming	146	24	—	—^{[a]}	—	—	—	—	—	—		
"—" denotes items which were not released in that country or failed to chart.

=== Live albums ===
List of live albums, with selected chart positions and certifications
Title	Album details	Peak chart positions							Certifications
Title	Album details	US	AUS	CAN	IRE	NLD	NOR	UK	Certifications
Josh Groban in Concert	Released: December 3, 2002; Label: 143, Reprise; Format: CD, CD/DVD	34	—	—	—	—	—	—	RIAA: Gold
Live at the Greek	Released: November 30, 2004; Label: 143, Reprise; Format: CD, CD/DVD	24	16	—	—	67	32	—	RIAA: Gold
Awake Live	Released: May 6, 2008; Label: 143, Reprise; Format: CD, CD/DVD	8	—	7	56	51	—	22	
Stages Live	Released: February 5, 2016; Label: Reprise; Format: CD/DVD, CD/Blu-ray, digital download	149	10	—	—	—	—	—	
Bridges Live: Madison Square Garden	Released: April 19, 2019; Label: Reprise; Format: CD/DVD	—	—	—	—	—	—	—	
"—" denotes items which were not released in that country or failed to chart.

=== Compilation albums ===
List of compilation albums, with selected chart positions and certifications
Title	Album details	Peak chart positions							Certifications
Title	Album details	AUS	IRE	NLD	NZ	NOR	SWE	UK	Certifications
With You	Released: 2007; Label: Hallmark; Format: CD	—	—	—	—	—	—	—	RIAA: Gold
A Collection	Released: December 1, 2008; Label: 143, Reprise; Format: CD	23	13	11	8	4	10	22	ARIA: Gold; BPI: Gold; IRMA: Platinum; SNEP: Gold; RIANZ: Platinum
Gems	Released: May 2, 2025; Label: Reprise; Format: CD, digital	79	—	—	—	—	—	—	
Hidden Gems	Released: November 14, 2025; Label: Reprise; Format: CD, digital	—	—	—	—	—	—	—	
"—" denotes items which were not released in that country or failed to chart.

== Singles ==
=== As main artist ===
List of singles, with selected chart positions and certifications, showing year released and album name
Title	Year	Peak chart positions							Certifications	Album
Title	Year	US	US AC	CAN	FRA	NOR	SWE	UK	Certifications	Album
"To Where You Are"	2001	—^{[b]}	1	—	—	—	—	53		Josh Groban
"You're Still You"	2002	—	10	—	—	—	—	—		Josh Groban
"O Holy Night"	2002	—^{[c]}	1	—	—	—	—	—		Josh Groban in Concert
"You Raise Me Up"	2003	73	1	—	16	—	—	74	RIAA: 3× Platinum	Closer
"Remember When It Rained"	2004	—	15	—	—	—	—	—		Closer
"Remember"	2004	—	—	—	—	—	—	—		Troy: Music from the Motion Picture
"Believe"	2004	—^{[d]}	1	86	—	97	—	—		The Polar Express: Original Motion Picture Soundtrack
"You Are Loved (Don't Give Up)"	2006	—^{[e]}	9	—	—	—	—	—		Awake
"Solo Por Ti"	2006	—	—	—	—	—	—	—		Awake
"Smile"	2006	—	—	—	—	—	—	—		Awake
"February Song"	2007	—	13	—	—	—	—	119		Awake
"You Raise Me Up" (with the African Children's Choir)	2007	76	—	—	—	—	—	—		Non-album single
"I'll Be Home for Christmas"	2007	95	1	—	—	—	—	—		Noël
"Silent Night" / "Noche de Paz (Silent Night)"	2007	—	19	—	—	5	—	—		Noël
"Ave Maria"	2007	—	—	54	—	—	50	—		Noël
"Little Drummer Boy" (with Andy McKee and Gigi Hadid)	2007	—	18	—	—	—	—	—		Noël
"The First Noël" (with Faith Hill)	2007	—^{[f]}	20	90	—	—	—	—		Noël
"Angels We Have Heard on High" (with Brian McKnight)	2007	—	29	—	—	—	—	—		Noël
"The Prayer (Live)" (with Celine Dion)	2008	70	—	37	—	—	—	—		Non-album single
"Awake"	2008	—	13	—	—	—	—	—		Awake Live
"Petit Papa Noël"	2008	—	—	—	12	—	—	—		A Collection
"Hidden Away"	2010	—	12	—	—	—	—	166		Illuminations
"Você Existe Em Mim"	2010	—	—	—	—	—	—	—		Illuminations
"Higher Window"	2010	—	19	—	—	—	—	—		Illuminations
"L'Ora Dell'Addio"	2010	—	—	—	—	—	—	—		Illuminations
"If I Walk Away"	2012	—	—	—	—	—	—	—		Illuminations
"Brave"	2012	—	13	—	—	—	—	64		All That Echoes
"I Believe (When I Fall in Love It Will Be Forever)"	2013	—	18	—	—	—	—	—		All That Echoes
"Your Hideaway"	2013	—	—	—	—	—	—	—		Non-album singles
"Remember When It Rained" (Live with Judith Hill)	2014	—	—	—	—	—	—	—		Non-album singles
"The Mystery of Your Gift" (with Brian Byrne and the American Boychoir)	2015	—	—	—	—	—	—	—		Non-album singles
"What I Did for Love"	2015	—	—	—	—	—	—	—		Stages
"Dust and Ashes"	2016	—	—	—	—	—	—	—		Natasha, Pierre & the Great Comet of 1812 (Original Broadway Cast Recording)
"Have Yourself a Merry Little Christmas"	2016	—	1	—	—	—	—	—		Non-album singles
"Happy Xmas (War Is Over)"	2017	—	4	—	—	—	—	—		Non-album singles
"Symphony"	2018	—	—	—	—	—	—	—		Bridges
"Granted"	2018	—	14	—	—	—	—	—		Bridges
"99 Years" (with Jennifer Nettles)	2019	—	21	—	—	—	—	—		Bridges
"Empty Sky"	2020	—	—	—	—	—	—	—		Non-album single
"The Impossible Dream"	2020	—	—	—	—	—	—	—		Harmony
"Angels"	2020	—	19	—	—	—	—	—		Harmony
"Celebrate Me Home"	2020	—	2	—	—	—	—	—		Harmony
"She"	2020	—	—	—	—	—	—	—		Harmony
"Do You Hear What I Hear?" (with the War and Treaty)	2024	—	22	—	—	—	—	—		Non-album single
"Be Alright"	2025	—	20	—	—	—	—	—		Gems
"The Constant"	2025	—	—	—	—	—	—	—		Hidden Gems
"Can You Feel the Love Tonight" (featuring Gay Men's Chorus of Los Angeles)	2026	—	—	—	—	—	—	—		Cinematic
"—" denotes items which were not released in that country or failed to chart.

=== As featured artist ===
List of singles, with selected chart positions, showing year released
Title	Year	Peak chart positions							
Title	Year	US	JP	AUS	CAN	NOR	NZ	SWE	UK
"We Are the World 25 for Haiti" (Artists for Haiti)	2010	2	—	18	7	1	8	5	50
"Forever Love (Live)" (with Yoshiki) (Live at Walt Disney Concert Hall)	2026	—	—	—	—	—	—	—	—

== Music videos ==
List of videos, showing year released
Title	Year
"To Where You Are"	2001
"You Raise Me Up"	2004
"Per Te"	2004
"Remember" (Soundtrack from the original motion picture Troy)	2004
"You Are Loved (Don't Give Up)"	2006
"February Song"	2007
"We Are the World 25 for Haiti" (Artists for Haiti)	2010
"Hidden Away"	2010
"Uncharted" (Cameo appearance) (Sara Bareilles)	2011
"Higher Window"	2011
"If I Walk Away"	2012
"Brave"	2013
"I Believe (When I Fall in Love It Will Be Forever)"	2013
"Hollow Talk"	2013
"What I Did For Love"	2015
"Pure Imagination"	2015
"Bring Him Home"	2015
"Over the Rainbow"	2015
"Anthem"	2015
"River"	2018

== Videography ==
=== CD/DVDs ===
- Josh Groban in Concert (2002)
- Live at the Greek (2004)
- Up Close with Josh Groban (Mother's Day release, 2008)
- Awake Live (2008)
- Soundstage Presents: Josh Groban – An Evening in New York City (2009)
- Stages Live (2016)
- Bridges Live from Madison Square Garden (2019)

=== DVD releases with other artists ===
- Sarah Brightman: La Luna: Live in Concert (DVD) – 2001 – Duet on "There for Me"
- Enchantment (Charlotte Church) – 2001 – Duet on "The Prayer and “Somewhere"
- Prelude: The Best of Charlotte Church – 2002 – Duet on "The Prayer"
- Concert for World Children's Day (DVD) – 2002 – Performed "Gira Con Me," "To Where You Are," "The Prayer" (duet with Céline Dion), and "Aren't They All Our Children Anthem" as a cast.
- Hitman David Foster & Friends (DVD) – 2008 – Performed "Bridge Over Troubled Water" With Bryan Mcknight.
- Chris Botti In Boston (DVD) – 2009 – Performed "Broken Vow".
- Chess in Concert (DVD) – 2009 – Performed "Where I Want to Be," "Quartet (Model of Decorum and Tranquility)," "Mountain Duet," "Anthem," "One More Opponent," "You and I," "The Interview," "Talking Chess," "Endgame," "You and I (Reprise)."

== Recordings with other artists ==
- Charlotte Church – Enchantment – 2001 – "The Prayer"
- Barbra Streisand – Duets – 2002 – "All I Know of Love"
- David Foster – The Best of Me – 2002 – "The Prayer" with Charlotte Church
- Hurricane Relief: Come Together Now – 2005 – "Alla Luce del Sole" and "Tears in Heaven" – fundraising compilation for victims of hurricanes Katrina and Rita
- Barbara Cook – Barbara Cook at the Met – 2006 – "Not While I'm Around" and "Move On" performed live at the Metropolitan Opera
- Angelique Kidjo – Djin Djin – 2007 – "Pearls" (also featuring Carlos Santana)
- Instant Karma: The Amnesty International Campaign to Save Darfur (American Express Edition) – 2007 – "Imagine"
- Hit Man: David Foster and Friends – 2008 – "Bridge Over Troubled Water" with Brian McKnight
- Charles Aznavour – Duos – 2008 – "La Boheme" (duet), recorded in French and English versions
- Plácido Domingo – Amore Infinito – 2008 – "La tua semplicità" (duet)
- Chris Botti – Chris Botti In Boston – 2009 – "Broken Vow"
- Nelly Furtado – Mi Plan – 2009 – "Silencio"
- Joshua Bell – At Home With Friends – 2009 – "Cinema Paradiso"
- Artists for Haiti – 2010 – "We Are the World 25 for Haiti" charity single
- Tony Bennett – Duets II – 2011 – "This Is All I Ask" (duet)
- Barbra Streisand – Partners – 2014 – "Somewhere" (duet)
- Jennifer Nettles – Bridges – 2019 – "99 Years" (duet)
- Barbra Streisand – The Secret of Life: Partners, Volume Two – 2025 – "Where Do I Go From You?" (duet)
- Yoshiki – "Forever Love (Live)" – 2026 (recorded at Walt Disney Concert Hall)

== Soundtracks ==
- A.I. Artificial Intelligence Original Motion Picture Score – 2001 – Duet on "For Always" (with Lara Fabian)
- Troy soundtrack – 2004 – "Remember" with Tanja Tzarovska
- The Polar Express soundtrack – 2004 – "Believe"
- Lady in the Water (teaser trailer) – 2006 – "Mi Mancherai (Il Postino)"
- Makete katsu/The Win After the Lose – NHK Japan miniseries theme song – 2012 – "KONOSAKI NO MICHI"

Boychoir 2015 Mystery of Your Gift

- Beauty and the Beast soundtrack – 2017 – "Evermore"
- Natasha, Pierre & the Great Comet of 1812 (Original Broadway Cast Recording) – 2017 – Principal soloist as Pierre Bezukhov
- Crazy Ex-Girlfriend season 3 soundtrack – 2018 – "The End of the Movie"
- Beauty and the Beast: A 30th Celebration (Original Soundtrack) – 2022 – Principal soloist as The Beast
- Sweeney Todd: The Demon Barber of Fleet Street (2023 Broadway Cast Recording) – 2023 – Principal soloist as Sweeney Todd

== Frequent collaborators ==
Certain performers have appeared with frequency as part of Groban's band. These include:

- Tariqh Akoni: guitar and music director
- Lucia Micarelli: violin, concert mistress, and featured soloist
- Tim Curle: percussion

== Notes ==
- A Cinematic did not enter the French Top Albums chart, but peaked at number 49 on the French Physical Albums chart.
- B "To Where You Are" did not enter the Billboard Hot 100, but peaked at number 16 on the Bubbling Under Hot 100 Singles chart.
- C "O Holy Night" did not enter the Billboard Hot 100, but peaked at number 9 on the Bubbling Under Hot 100 Singles chart.
- D "Believe" did not enter the Billboard Hot 100, but peaked at number 12 on the Bubbling Under Hot 100 Singles chart.
- E "You Are Loved (Don't Give Up)" did not enter the Billboard Hot 100, but peaked at number 10 on the Bubbling Under Hot 100 Singles chart.
- F "The First Noël" did not enter the Billboard Hot 100, but peaked at number 23 on the Bubbling Under Hot 100 Singles chart.
