= A Collection (Josh Groban album) =

Greatest hits album by Josh Groban
- Released: December 1, 2008
- Recorded: 2001–2008
- Genres: Classical; operatic pop; classical crossover; pop rock
- Length: 71:36
- Labels: 143; Warner Bros.
- Producer: David Foster

Josh Groban chronology
| Awake Live (2008) | A Collection (2008) | Illuminations (2010) |

A Collection is the first greatest hits album of American pop-classical singer Josh Groban. It was released in late 2008 internationally.

The compilation takes tracks from his first three studio albums, Josh Groban (2001), Closer (2003), Awake (2006), as well as Groban's version of the Chess song "Anthem", from the 2009 Chess in Concert release. It contains one new song, a live version of "Weeping" (originally recorded for Awake) featuring South African singer Vusi Mahlasela and the Soweto Gospel Choir. It also features "Smile", previously only available via the Internet edition of Awake.

The album also comes with a second disc of five selections from Groban's 2007 holiday album Noël as well as a Spanish version of "Silent Night" (Noche de Paz).

== Track listing ==
=== Disc 1 ===
| No. | Title | Writer(s) | Length |
|---|---|---|---|
| 1. | "Oceano" | Leo Z/Andrea Sandri/Mauro Malavasi | 4:04 |
| 2. | "February Song" | Josh Groban/Marius de Vries/John Ondrasik | 5:14 |
| 3. | "You Are Loved (Don't Give Up)" | Thomas Salter | 4:50 |
| 4. | "You Raise Me Up" | Brendan Graham/Rolf Løvland | 4:51 |
| 5. | "In Her Eyes" | Michael Hunter Ochs/Jeff Cohen/Andy Selby | 4:56 |
| 6. | "Awake" | Josh Groban/Eric Mouquet/Dave Bassett | 5:14 |
| 7. | "Alla Luce del Sole" | Maurizio Fabrizio/Guido Morra | 4:18 |
| 8. | "To Where You Are" | Richard Marx/Linda Thompson | 3:55 |
| 9. | "Anthem [Live]" | Björn Ulvaeus/Benny Andersson/Tim Rice | 3:43 |
| 10. | "Per Te" | Marco Marinangeli/Walter Afanasieff/Josh Groban | 4:17 |
| 11. | "Remember When It Rained" | Josh Groban/Eric Mouquet | 4:41 |
| 12. | "Weeping" (Live; Featuring Vusi Mahlasela and the Soweto Gospel Choir) | Dan Heymann | 5:35 |
| 13. | "Aléjate" | Albert Hammond/Marti Sharron | 4:51 |
| 14. | "Hymne à l'amour" | Édith Piaf/Marguerite Monnot/Geoffrey Parsons | 4:05 |
| 15. | "Cinema Paradiso (Se)" | Ennio Morricone/Andrea Morricone/Alessio de Sensi | 3:27 |
| 16. | "Smile" | Charles Chaplin/John Turner/Geoffrey Parsons | 3:44 |

=== Disc 2 ===
| No. | Title | Length |
|---|---|---|
| 1. | "Silent Night" | 4:11 |
| 2. | "Little Drummer Boy" (Featuring guitarist Andy McKee and Gigi Hadid) | 4:20 |
| 3. | "Ave Maria" | 5:17 |
| 4. | "Panis angelicus" | 4:19 |
| 5. | "Petit Papa Noël" | 4:05 |
| 6. | "Noche de Paz (Silent Night)" | 4:11 |

== Charts ==
=== Weekly charts ===
| Chart (2008) | Peak position |
|---|---|
| Australian Albums (ARIA) | 23 |
| Austrian Albums (Ö3 Austria) | 26 |
| Belgian Albums (Ultratop Flanders) | 85 |
| Belgian Albums (Ultratop Wallonia) | 11 |
| Danish Albums (Hitlisten) | 1 |
| Dutch Albums (Album Top 100) | 11 |
| Finnish Albums (Suomen virallinen lista) | 25 |
| German Albums (Offizielle Top 100) | 53 |
| Irish Albums (IRMA) | 13 |
| New Zealand Albums (RMNZ) | 8 |
| Norwegian Albums (VG-lista) | 4 |
| Portuguese Albums (AFP) | 13 |
| Scottish Albums (Official Charts) | 24 |
| Swedish Albums (Sverigetopplistan) | 10 |
| Swiss Albums (Schweizer Hitparade) | 19 |
| UK Albums (Official Charts) | 22 |

=== Year-end charts ===
| Chart (2008) | Position |
|---|---|
| Dutch Albums (Album Top 100) | 74 |
| Swedish Albums (Sverigetopplistan) | 50 |
| UK Albums (OCC) | 112 |

== Certifications and sales ==
| Region | Certification | Certified units/sales |
|---|---|---|
| Australia (ARIA) | Gold | 35,000^{^} |
| Denmark (IFPI Danmark) | Gold | 15,000^{^} |
| France (SNEP) | Gold | 75,000^{*} |
| Ireland (IRMA) | Platinum | 15,000^{^} |
| New Zealand (RMNZ) | Platinum | 15,000^{^} |
| Sweden (GLF) | Gold | 20,000^{^} |
| United Kingdom (BPI) | Gold | 100,000^{^} |
^{*} Sales figures based on certification alone.^{^} Shipments figures based on certification alone.
