= Awake Live =

Live album by Josh Groban
- Released: May 6, 2008
- Recorded: August 28, 2007
- Genre: Operatic pop; classical; vocal; Gospel
- Length: 100 minutes
- Label: WEA; Reprise; 143 Records
- Director: Hamish Hamilton

Josh Groban chronology
Noël (2007)	Awake Live (2008)	A Collection (2008)

Professional ratings
Review scores
Source	Rating
AllMusic	4.5/5 stars
Billboard	5/5 stars
Starpulse	4.5/5 stars

Awake Live is a live concert album and video by singer Josh Groban. It was released on May 6, 2008.

In the United States, the album is available as a single release in most retail stores. However, the official Josh Groban website released a limited edition internet version of the CD and DVD/Blu-ray with bonus music, alternate album cover and expanded booklet with fan generated photos.

Awake Live captures the Grammy nominated singer's performance at Salt Lake City's Energy Solutions Arena before a sold-out crowd of 15,000 fans on August 28, 2007. While the DVD includes fan favorites from Groban's three best-selling albums, including "Canto Alla Vita" and "Alla Luce del Sole" from his double-platinum self-titled 2001 debut, "You Raise Me Up" and "Remember When It Rained" from the multi-platinum 2003 album Closer, the majority of the songs are from Awake, including the singles "You Are Loved (Don't Give Up)", "February Song", and "Lullaby". Released in September 2006, Awake debuted at number 2 on the Billboard albums chart and has sold more than two million copies in the U.S.

Awake Live is Groban's third live DVD, following 2002's Josh Groban in Concert and 2004's Live at the Greek. The Salt Lake City location was selected in honor of his first arena concert, which occurred in the same city. Groban also sang at the closing ceremony for the 2002 Winter Olympics in Salt Lake City, a performance that was seen by more than two billion people.

On May 15, 2008, over 30 theatres nationwide participated in a screening of Josh Groban's Awake Live in HD. Awake Live is the first time the internationally renowned vocalist showcased a live performance on the silver screen.

== Track listing ==
CD
No.	Title	Writer(s)	Length
1.	"Mai"	Andrea Sandri; Leonardo De Bernardini; Marco Marinangeli	4:43
2.	"February Song"	Josh Groban; John Ondrasik; Marius De Vries	5:11
3.	"In Her Eyes"	Jeff Cohen; Michael Hunter Ochs; Andy Selby	4:55
4.	"So She Dances"	Adam Crossley; Asher Lenz	5:01
5.	"Un Dia Llegara"	Claudia Brant; Oksana Grigorieva	4:28
6.	"Pearls" (with Angelique Kidjo)	Andrew Hale; Sade Adu	5:55
7.	"Weeping"	Dan Heymann	5:35
8.	"Machine"	Josh Groban; Éric Mouquet; Dave Bassett	5:17
9.	"Awake"	Josh Groban; Eric Mouquet; Thomas Salter	7:05
Total length:			48:10

Exclusive internet edition bonus tracks
No.	Title	Writer(s)	Length
8.	"Lullaby"	Josh Groban; David John Matthews; Jochem Van Der Saag
9.	"You Are Loved (Don't Give Up)"	Thomas Salter

=== DVD ===
1. "You Are Loved (Don't Give Up)"
2. "Mai"
3. "Un Dia Llegara"
4. "Un Giorno Per Noi"
5. "Now or Never"
6. "So She Dances"
7. "February Song"
8. "Alla Luce del Sole"
9. "Aurora" (featuring Lucia Micarelli)
10. "Kashmir" (featuring Lucia Micarelli)
11. "In Her Eyes"
12. "Pearls" (featuring Angelique Kidjo)
13. "L'Ultima Notte"
14. "Remember When It Rained"
15. "Lullaby"
16. "Weeping"
17. "Machine"
18. "Canto Alla Vita"
19. "You Raise Me Up"
20. "Awake"

DVD bonus materials

1. "Making of Awake Live"
2. "Behind The Big Orange Curtain"
