= Awake Tour =

2007 concert tour by Josh Groban

- World tour by Josh Groban
- Location: North America, Europe, Australasia
- Associated album: Awake
- Start date: February 17, 2007
- End date: October 18, 2007
- Legs: 5
- No. of shows: 56 in North America; 12 in Europe; 11 in Oceania; 2 in Asia; 81 in total

Josh Groban concert chronology
- Closer Tour (2004-5); Awake Tour (2007); Before We Begin (2010)

The Awake Tour is the second concert tour by American singer-songwriter and actor Josh Groban. Visiting North America, Europe and Australasia over 8 months the tour supported his third studio album, Awake, released on November 7, 2006.

== Background ==
The tour was announced on November 15, 2006 by 143/Reprise Records with initially only 29 dates from February 17 to April 7, 2007. European dates were announced later on and more summer dates in the U.S. and Canada were announced in June 2007. The tour concluded on October 18, 2007 in Manila.

== Opening Acts ==
Angelique Kidjo

== Set list ==
(As per most concerts)

1. "You Are Loved (Don't Give Up)"
2. "Mai"
3. "Un Dia Llegara"
4. "Un Giorno Per Noi"
5. "Now or Never"
6. "So She Dances"
7. "February Song"
8. "Alla Luce Del Sole"

Josh welcomes Lucia Micarelli

1. "Aurora" (Lucia on violin)
2. "Kashmir" (Lucia on violin)

Josh Groban returns entering through the audience

1. "In Her Eyes"
2. "Pearls" featuring Angelique Kidjo (Sade cover)
3. "L'Ultima Notte"
4. "Remember When It Rained"
5. "Lullaby"
6. "Weeping"
7. "Machine"

Encore

1. "Canto Alla Vita"
2. "You Raise Me Up"
3. "Awake"

== Broadcasts and recordings ==
The August 28, 2007 show in Salt Lake City was professionally filmed and recorded then released as Awake Live on May 6, 2008 following a showing in movie theatres on May 1, 2008 and before premiering on PBS Soundstage on June 26, 2008.

== Tour dates ==
Date	City	Country	Venue
North America
February 17, 2007	Verona	United States	Turning Stone Event Center
February 18, 2007	Cleveland	United States	Quicken Loans Arena
February 20, 2007	Grand Rapids	United States	Van Andel Arena
February 21, 2007	Columbus	United States	Nationwide Arena
February 23, 2007	Auburn Hills	United States	The Palace of Auburn Hills
February 24, 2007	Chicago	United States	United Center
February 26, 2007	London	Canada	John Labatt Centre
February 27, 2007	Ottawa	Canada	Scotiabank Place
March 1, 2007	Philadelphia	United States	Wachovia Center
March 2, 2007	Boston	United States	TD Banknorth Garden
March 4, 2007	Montreal	Canada	Bell Centre
March 5, 2007	Toronto	Canada	Air Canada Centre
March 7, 2007	Providence	United States	Dunkin' Donuts Center
March 8, 2007	Uncasville	United States	Mohegan Sun Arena
March 10, 2007	Rochester	United States	Blue Cross Arena
March 12, 2007	New York City	United States	Madison Square Garden
March 13, 2007	Washington, D.C.	United States	Verizon Center
March 16, 2007	Raleigh	United States	RBC Center
March 17, 2007	Atlanta	United States	Philips Arena
March 19, 2007	Dallas	United States	American Airlines Center
March 21, 2007	Houston	United States	Toyota Center
March 22, 2007	San Antonio	United States	AT&T Center
March 25, 2007	Phoenix	United States	US Airways Center
March 27, 2007	Sacramento	United States	ARCO Arena
March 28, 2007	San Jose	United States	HP Pavilion at San Jose
March 31, 2007	Los Angeles	United States	Staples Center
April 4, 2007	Fresno	United States	Save Mart Center
April 6, 2007	San Diego	United States	iPayOne Center
April 7, 2007	Las Vegas	United States	MGM Grand Garden Arena
Europe
May 18, 2007	Oslo	Norway	Oslo Spektrum
May 19, 2007	Stockholm	Sweden	Annexet
May 21, 2007	Amsterdam	Netherlands	Heineken Music Hall
May 22, 2007	Frankfurt	Germany	Alte Oper
May 25, 2007	Birmingham	England	Symphony Hall
May 27, 2007	Manchester	England	Bridgewater Hall
May 28, 2007	Glasgow	Scotland	Clyde Auditorium
May 30, 2007	Dublin	Ireland	Point Theatre
June 2, 2007	Brussels	Belgium	Cirque Royal
June 3, 2007	Paris	France	Grand Amphitheatre
June 6, 2007	London	England	Hampton Court Palace
June 8, 2007	Lyon	France	Salle 3000
June 10, 2007	Nice	France	Palais Nikaïa
June 12, 2007	Zürich	Switzerland	Kongresshaus
North America Leg 2
July 17, 2007	Greenville	United States	Bi-Lo Center
July 20, 2007	Norfolk	United States	Norfolk Scope
July 21, 2007	Atlantic City	United States	Boardwalk Hall
July 24, 2007	East Rutherford	United States	Continental Airlines Arena
July 25, 2007	Uniondale	United States	Nassau Veterans Memorial Coliseum
July 27, 2007	Manchester	United States	Verizon Wireless Arena
July 28, 2007	Albany	United States	Pepsi Arena
July 30, 2007	Uncasville	United States	Mohegan Sun Arena
July 31, 2007	Wilkes-Barre	United States	Wachovia Arena
August 3, 2007	Hershey	United States	Giant Center
August 4, 2007	Pittsburgh	United States	Mellon Arena
August 7, 2007	Milwaukee	United States	US Cellular Arena
August 8, 2007	Green Bay	United States	Resch Center
August 10, 2007	Saint Paul	United States	Xcel Energy Center
August 12, 2007	Winnipeg	Canada	MTS Centre
August 14, 2007	Edmonton	Canada	Rexall Place
August 15, 2007	Calgary	Canada	Scotiabank Saddledome
August 17, 2007	Vancouver	Canada	General Motors Place
August 18, 2007	Seattle	United States	KeyArena
August 21, 2007	Boise	United States	Taco Bell Arena
August 22, 2007	Portland	United States	Rose Garden
August 24, 2007	Stockton	United States	Stockton Arena
August 25, 2007	Anaheim	United States	Honda Center
August 28, 2007	Salt Lake City	United States	EnergySolutions Arena (DVD and PBS special filming)
August 29, 2007	Denver	United States	Pepsi Center
August 31, 2007	Omaha	United States	Qwest Center Omaha
September 2, 2007	Charlotte	United States	Charlotte Bobcats Arena
Oceania
September 28, 2007	Melbourne	Australia	Hamer Hall
September 30, 2007	Sydney	Australia	Sydney Opera House
October 1, 2007	Sydney	Australia	Sydney Opera House
October 3, 2007	Sydney	Australia	Sydney Opera House
October 4, 2007	Sydney	Australia	Sydney Opera House
October 6, 2007	Brisbane	Australia	Brisbane Concert Hall
October 7, 2007	Brisbane	Australia	Brisbane Concert Hall
October 9, 2007	Melbourne	Australia	Hamer Hall
October 10, 2007	Melbourne	Australia	Hamer Hall
October 12, 2007	Adelaide	Australia	Adelaide Entertainment Centre
October 14, 2007	Perth	Australia	Supreme Court Gardens
Asia
October 17, 2007	Manila	Philippines	Philippine International Convention Center
October 18, 2007	Manila	Philippines	Philippine International Convention Center

== Cancelled or Postponed shows ==
The July 18, 2007 in Charlotte was postponed 2 and a half hours before Angelique Kidjo was to begin due to Groban's ear and nose infection and rescheduled to September 2, 2007.
