= Lucia Micarelli =

American violinist, singer and actress

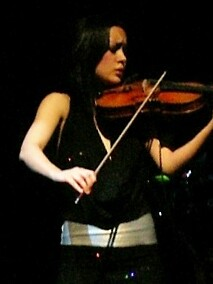
- Micarelli playing the violin during Josh Groban's 2007 concert in the Palais des Congrès, in Paris.

Background information
- Born: Queens, New York, U.S.
- Genres: Classical rock; pop rock
- Occupations: Violinist; actress
- Instrument: Violin
- Years active: 2003–present
- Spouse(s): Eric Byers, Cellist (married 2022-present).
- Website: luciamicarelli.com

Lucia Micarelli is an American violinist, singer and actress best known for her collaborations with Josh Groban, Chris Botti, Jethro Tull, and her role as Annie Talarico in Treme.

== Music career ==
Micarelli was the concertmaster with the Trans-Siberian Orchestra (TSO) on their Christmas Season Tour in 2003. After her tour with TSO, she joined Josh Groban on his Closer Tour as a guest soloist and concertmaster.

In 2006 Micarelli appeared as a featured soloist with Ian Anderson (of Jethro Tull) in Vienna with the Vienna Radio Orchestra.

In 2004, Micarelli released her first album Music From A Farther Room, executive-produced by Josh Groban. It is a blend of classical pieces and familiar pop songs, including Queen's "Bohemian Rhapsody", David Bowie's "Lady Grinning Soul" and David Foster's "To Love You More". In May 2005, she opened for West End singer Michael Ball. In October and November 2005 and most of 2006, Micarelli toured the United States with Jethro Tull.

Micarelli toured In 2007 with Groban on the Awake Tour to promote his album Awake, and completed her second album, titled Interlude.

In 2008, Micarelli toured with trumpeter Chris Botti. While on tour with Botti in July 2009, she injured her left hand badly enough to affect her ability to play. Her rehabilitation was successful, and she was soon playing again, as the numbness in three of her fingers slowly subsided. She also toured with Botti in 2015-2016.

She appeared on a PBS special on June 3, 2017, and appeared at the Vancouver Island Musicfest July 14–15, 2017.

Micarelli did the Harmony Tour with Groban in 2022, a tour that spanned over 25 cities. She played his Hollywood Bowl sows in September of 2025. Most recently, Micarelli was on Groban's Stage, Screen & Symphony Tour including 13 dates with orchestras at locations such as Wolftrap, Blossom, and Riverbend.

Micarelli has collaborated on several live performances and arrangements connected to Wicked:

- Wicked: One Wonderful Night: She performed live violin on stage alongside Cynthia Erivo at the Dolbh Theatre for the 2025 special Wicked: One Wonder Night broadcast, playing tracks such as "I'm Not That Girl."
- "No Good Deed" Live Reimagining: She teamed up with Cynthia Erivo on violin, alongside cellist Eric Byers and dancer Misty Copeland, for a stripped-down live rendition of No Good Deed arranged by Steve Hackman.

Micarelli also has her own tours. For example, she toured her album Suadade with Leo Amuedo in late 2023 and 2024, performing over 25 shows. And in 2025-2026 she toured her album Anthropology with her husband cellist Eric Byers and bassist Nate Farrington. Tours are arranged by Michael Morris at Mint Talent Group.

Micarelli's recent solo performances include a performance with Orchestra Santa Monica in February 2024, a performance at the Rady Shell in San Diego with the Mainly Mozart All-Star Orchestra in 2024, and a September 2026 performance of the Brahms Double Concerto for Violin and Cello with the Evansville (IN) Philharmonic.

== Acting career ==
Micarelli played the role of musician Annie Talarico in HBO's television series Treme, about life in New Orleans after Hurricane Katrina.

Micarelli also had a role in an episode of the WGN television series Manhattan in 2014.

Micarelli plays the lead character, Kate, in the 2020 Hallmark Movies & Mysteries original movie, The Christmas Bow.

== Composing career ==
Micarelli has composed music for two documentaries produced by Jason Hehir:

- Murder in Boston: Roots, Rampage, and Reckoning (2023)
- Novak Djokovic: The Wolf in Winter (2026).

== Discography ==
- Music from a Farther Room (2004)
- "Bohemian Rhapsody" in Josh Groban's Live at the Greek DVD (2004)
- duet with William Joseph in "Kashmir" single (2004)
- Interlude (2006)
- featured soloist "Kashmir" on Josh Groban's Awake Live DVD (2008)
- featured soloist on "Emmanuel" on Chris Botti in Boston (2009)
- featured soloist on Yael's The Love Project Journey DVD/CD (2010)
- featured soloist on several cuts on the CDs from the Treme TV show: "I Don't Stand a Ghost of a Chance" (2010), "New Orleans Blues" (2010), "Heavy Henry" (2011), "Spring Can Really Hang You Up" (2011), "Carved in Stone" (2011)
- duet (voice & violin) with Steve Earle "One More Cup of Coffee" in the Chimes of Freedom CD set (2012) issued by Amnesty International
- An Evening with Lucia Micarelli Live, recorded live at Hahn Hall for PBS (2018)
- Suadede with Leo Amuedo (2023)
- Musical Priest (2024)
- Anthropology (2025) with Eric Byers and Nate Farrington.
