= Spirit of the Season =

Song by Alan Silvestri

from the album The Polar Express
- Released: November 10, 2004
- Genre: Holiday
- Length: 2:34
- Songwriters: Glen Ballard; Alan Silvestri

The Polar Express track listing
- 14 tracks: 1. "The Polar Express"; 2. "When Christmas Comes to Town"; 3. "Rockin' On Top of the World"; 4. "Believe"; 5. "Hot Chocolate"; 6. "Spirit of the Season"; 7. "Seeing Is Believing"; 8. "Santa Claus Is Comin' to Town"; 9. "White Christmas"; 10. "Winter Wonderland"; 11. "It's Beginning to Look a Lot Like Christmas"; 12. "Silver Bells"; 13. "Here Comes Santa Claus"; 14. "Suite from the Polar Express"

"Spirit of the Season" is a song composed by Alan Silvestri with lyrics by Glen Ballard for the movie The Polar Express. It serves as a motif in the background score throughout several scenes, and the elves sing it while preparing Santa's sleigh. The full version, orchestrated by Conrad Pope and featuring both orchestra and choir, can be heard during the end credits, and is included in the soundtrack album.

A cover of the song by the Mormon Tabernacle Choir is featured in their homonymous album with Sissel, which was nominated for 2 Grammys, Best Classical Crossover Album and Best Engineered Album – Classical. It was also featured in the former Disney World Christmas fireworks show at the Magic Kingdom titled “Holiday Wishes”.
