= Bright Blue =

Bright Blue may refer to:

- Bright Blue (band)
- Bright Blue (organisation), think tank in London
