= Granted =

Single by Josh Groban

from the album Bridges
- Released: June 2018
- Genre: Ballad
- Length: 4:38
- Label: Reprise
- Songwriter(s): Josh Groban; Bernie Herms; Toby Gad
- Producer(s): Bernie Herms; Toby Gad

Josh Groban singles chronology
"Symphony" (2018)	"Granted" (2018)	"99 Years (with Jennifer Nettles)" (2019)

Music video
- "Granted" on YouTube

"Granted" is a song by American singer Josh Groban, It was released in early June 2018 along with a lyric video as the lead single on his album Bridges.

== Charts ==
=== Weekly charts ===
Chart (2018)	Peak position
US Adult Contemporary (Billboard)	14

=== Year-end charts ===
Chart (2018)	Position
US Adult Contemporary (Billboard)	34
