= Bright Blue (band) =

South African pop rock band

- Origin: South Africa
- Genres: Pop, rock, mbaqanga
- Past members: Ian Cohen; Peter Cohen; Tom Fox; Dan Heymann
- Website: www.rock.co.za/brightblue/index.html

Bright Blue was a South African band that was prominent on the progressive scene in the final years of apartheid. The band's name "reflected the paradox of being bright in a very blue time" but was also a tribute to Chelsea FC.

They are best known for the protest song "Weeping", written by keyboard-player Dan Heymann, that the band recorded incorporating strands of "Nkosi Sikelel' iAfrika" at a time when public performance of the ANC anthem could lead to summary arrest. However, the powers that be seemed to notice neither the reference to a banned tune nor that the song was an allegory about then State President PW Botha and the state of emergency that he had imposed.

In 1999, "Weeping" was voted the "All-time favourite South African song" in a poll by SA Rock Digest/Amuzine. The Radio Rats' 1979 hit, "ZX Dan", was placed second, while "Scatterlings of Africa" (1983) by Johnny Clegg and Juluka was third.

The song was covered by Qkumba Zoo in 1996, Soweto String Quartet featuring Vusi Mahlasela in 1996, Coenie de Villiers in 1997, James Stewart in 2002, Soweto Gospel Choir in 2004, Josh Groban (with Ladysmith Black Mambazo) in 2006, and Louise Carver in 2009.

The band's other hits include "Window on the World" (1984), "Where Would I Go?" (1989) and "Wouldn't Miss It for the World" (1996).

== Musicians ==
- Ian Cohen — bass, vocals
- Peter Cohen — drums, vocals
- Tom Fox — guitar, vocals
- Dan Heymann — keyboards
- Robin Levetan — vocals (first album only)
- Basil Coetzee — saxophone on "Weeping"
- McCoy Mrubata — saxophone on "Yesterday Night"
- Peter Barnett — percussion on first album
- Scorpion Madondo — saxophone on "Time on my Own"
- Terri Cohen — backing vocals (1996, 2001)
- Tonia Selley — backing vocals (1996)
- Mark Goliath — keyboards (2001)
- Buddy Wells — saxophone on "Madiba 1990"

== Albums ==
- Bright Blue (1984)
- The Rising Tide (1988)
- Every Now and Then—The Best So Far… 1984–2001 (2001)
