= Bridges (Josh Groban album) =

Studio album by Josh Groban
- Released: September 21, 2018
- Recorded: Fall 2016–18
- Genre: Operatic pop; classical; classical crossover; pop rock
- Length: 49:37
- Language: English; French; Italian; Spanish
- Label: Reprise
- Producer: Bernie Herms; Toby Gad; Lester Mendez; Steve Jordan; Dann Huff

Josh Groban chronology
Stages Live (2016)	Bridges (2018)	Bridges Live: Madison Square Garden (2019)

Josh Groban studio album chronology
Stages (2015)	Bridges (2018)	Harmony (2020)

Bridges is the eighth studio album by Josh Groban, released by Reprise on September 21, 2018. It is Groban's first album since 2013's All That Echoes to include original music, and he co-wrote nine of the album's 12 tracks. The deluxe edition includes two bonus tracks.

== Background ==
Speaking to Newsweek, Groban said that after performing on Broadway in The Great Comet from 2016 to 2017, "I didn't even want a break. I just dove into writing. There are some albums, like the last one, where I don't want to write at all, I just want to be a vocalist. Then there are some where you're pouring out idea after idea. I've had sad albums in the past and I wanted an album that had an uplifting spirit, for my psyche and also for the psyche of listeners. I think we all need that."

== Commercial performance ==
Bridges debuted at number two on the US Billboard 200 with 96,000 album-equivalent units, of which 94,000 were pure album sales, and was kept off the tip of that chart by the fourth studio album by American hip-hop group Brockhampton, Iridescence. It is Groban's ninth US top 10 album. On another chart, it had more success when it debuted at number one on the US Top Album Sales chart dated October 6, 2018.

== Track listing ==
Standard Version

No.	Title	Writer(s)	Length
1.	"Granted"	Bernie Herms; Josh Groban; Toby Gad	4:39
2.	"Symphony"	Herms; Groban; Gad	3:32
3.	"River"	Herms; Groban; Gad	4:13
4.	"Música del corazón" (featuring Vicente Amigo)	Claudia Brant; Groban; Lester Mendez	4:14
5.	"Bridge over Troubled Water"	Paul Simon	4:52
6.	"Run" (duet with Sarah McLachlan)	Gary Lightbody; Jonathan Quinn; Mark McClelland; Nathan Connolly; Iain Archer	4:47
7.	"S'il suffisait d'aimer"	Jean-Jacques Goldman	4:23
8.	"Won't Look Back"	Groban; Steve Robson; Wayne Hector	3:41
9.	"We Will Meet Once Again" (duet with Andrea Bocelli)	Andrea Bocelli; Bernie Herms; Jacqueline Nemorin; Groban; Marco Guazzone; Gad	3:55
10.	"More of You"	Gad; Danny O'Donoghue; Groban; Mark Sheehan	4:15
11.	"99 Years" (duet with Jennifer Nettles)	Herms; Groban; Gad	4:02
12.	"Bigger than Us"	Herms; Groban; Gad	3:04
Total length:			49:37

Deluxe edition bonus tracks& Japanese edition bonus tracks
No.	Title	Writer(s)	Length
13.	"You Have No Idea"	Dan Wilson; Francis Anthony White; Harry Connick, Jr.	4:38
14.	"She's Always a Woman"	Billy Joel	4:00
Total length:			58:15

Target edition bonus tracks
No.	Title	Writer(s)	Length
13.	"You Have No Idea"	Wilson; White; Connick	4:38
14.	"She's Always a Woman"	Joel	4:00
15.	"Signs"	Herms; Groban; Gad	4:41
16.	"Everything You Needed"	Sia Furler	3:50
Total length:			66:46

== Charts ==
Chart (2018)	Peak position
Australian Albums (ARIA)	14
Austrian Albums (Ö3 Austria)	32
Belgian Albums (Ultratop Flanders)	68
Belgian Albums (Ultratop Wallonia)	46
Canadian Albums (Billboard)	18
Dutch Albums (Album Top 100)	29
German Albums (Offizielle Top 100)	14
Hungarian Albums (MAHASZ)	17
Irish Albums (IRMA)	14
Scottish Albums (OCC)	4
Spanish Albums (PROMUSICAE)	85
Swiss Albums (Schweizer Hitparade)	17
UK Albums (OCC)	6
US Billboard 200	2
