= The Polar Express (soundtrack) =

The Polar Express: Original Motion Picture Soundtrack

Soundtrack album by Various Artists
- Released: November 2, 2004
- Studios: Sony Scoring Stage, Culver City
- Genre: Christmas music
- Length: 46:06
- Labels: Warner Sunset; Reprise
- Producers: Tom Whalley; Jeff Ayeroff; Jeff Aldrich; Diarmuid Quinn

Singles from The Polar Express: Original Motion Picture Soundtrack
- 1. "Believe" Released: November 2, 2004

Professional ratings
Review scores
Source	Rating
AllMusic	3.5/5 stars

The Polar Express: Original Motion Picture Soundtrack is the soundtrack to the animated film of the same name, released on November 2, 2004 by Warner Sunset Records and Reprise Records, composed and conducted by Alan Silvestri, with orchestrations provided by William Ross and Conrad Pope.

The song, "Believe", composed by Glen Ballard and Alan Silvestri, was nominated for Best Original Song at the 77th Academy Awards. It was sung at the 77th Academy Awards show by original performer Josh Groban with Beyoncé. It gained a Grammy Award in 2006.

The album was certified Gold by the RIAA in November 2007. Having sold 724,000 copies in the United States, it is the best-selling film soundtrack/holiday album hybrid since Nielsen SoundScan started tracking music sales in 1991.

Aside from the final track, the soundtrack includes only the vocal songs featured in the film. Most of the original orchestral score featured in the film has never been commercially released. A limited number of promotional "For Your Consideration" CDs containing nearly the complete score were released in 2005.

== Track listing ==
The Polar Express: Original Motion Picture Soundtrack
No.	Title	Performer(s)	Length
1.	"The Polar Express"	Tom Hanks	3:25
2.	"When Christmas Comes to Town"	Matthew Hall and Meagan Moore	4:07
3.	"Rockin' on Top of the World"	Steven Tyler	2:35
4.	"Believe"	Josh Groban	4:18
5.	"Hot Chocolate"	Hanks	2:33
6.	"Spirit of the Season"	Alan Silvestri	2:33
7.	"Seeing Is Believing"	Silvestri	3:47
8.	"Santa Claus Is Comin' to Town"	Frank Sinatra	2:35
9.	"White Christmas"	Bing Crosby	3:05
10.	"Winter Wonderland"	The Andrews Sisters	2:43
11.	"It's Beginning to Look a Lot Like Christmas"	Perry Como with The Fontane Sisters	2:40
12.	"Silver Bells"	Kate Smith	2:39
13.	"Here Comes Santa Claus (Right Down Santa Claus Lane)"	Crosby and The Andrews Sisters	3:04
14.	"Suite from The Polar Express"	Silvestri	6:02
Total length:			46:06

== Charts ==
Chart performance for The Polar Express: Original Motion Picture Soundtrack
Chart (2022–2023)	Peak position
Norwegian Albums (VG-lista)	25

== Certifications ==
Certifications for The Polar Express: Original Motion Picture Soundtrack
Region	Certification	Certified units/sales
United States (RIAA)	Gold	500,000^{^}
^{^} Shipments figures based on certification alone.

== See also ==
- List of Billboard Top Holiday Albums number ones of the 2000s
