= Noël (Josh Groban album) =

Studio album by Josh Groban
- Released: October 9, 2007; November 3, 2017 (deluxe edition)
- Recorded: April–July 2007
- Genres: Pop; Christmas; classical
- Length: 56:01
- Labels: 143; Reprise
- Producers: David Foster; Humberto Gatica

Josh Groban chronology
Awake (2006)	Noël (2007)	Awake Live (2008)

Noël is a Christmas album and the fourth studio album by Josh Groban that was released on October 9, 2007.

According to Nielsen SoundScan, the album sold 3,699,000 copies in 2007 after its release, making it the overall best-selling album in the US for all of 2007. It was also the best-selling holiday album in 2008, with sales of 915,000 copies. As of October 2015, the album has sold 5.8 million copies in the United States according to SoundScan, making it the second best-selling holiday album in the US in the Nielsen SoundScan era (March 1991–present) behind Kenny G's 1994 holiday set Miracles: The Holiday Album. In the United States, the album is available as a single CD release in most retail stores. However, Target stores released a limited-edition version of the album with a bonus DVD that features a "making of" documentary entitled The Making of Noël. According to Billboard, Noël is the second best-selling classical album of the 2000s decade in the US, behind Groban's own Closer.

On August 14, 2017, Noël was certified Sextuple Platinum by the Recording Industry Association of America, recognizing shipment of six million copies in the United States.

On October 12, 2017, Groban announced a tenth-anniversary deluxe edition, released on November 3. It includes six songs not featured in the initial release, including four new recordings.

== Critical reception ==
Professional ratings
Review scores
Source	Rating
AllMusic	3/5 stars
ARTISTdirect	4/5 stars

AllMusic editor Matt Collar found that the album "features more of Groban's dewy, supple vocals set to David Foster's cinematic orchestrations [...] While most of the productions here should appeal to longtime fans of Groban's particular classical-crossover sound, some cuts like soft rock inflected "It Came Upon a Midnight Clear" and the Celtic folk leaning "Little Drummer Boy" do expand upon the Groban/Foster palette in a pleasing way". BBC Music critic Michael Quinn felt that Noël was "as perfect a yuletide present as Groban could have given his fans".

== Chart performance ==
Seven weeks after its release, Noël reached No. 1 on the U.S. Billboard 200 on the chart dated December 8, 2007. The album sold about 405,000 copies in the week it reached number one, rising from the number two position with an 81% sales increase. The week's sales corresponded to an appearance by Groban on The Oprah Winfrey Show during the highly anticipated annual Oprah's Favorite Things feature.

In the next week, the album stayed at No. 1 on the Billboard 200 and its sales increased further, by 33%, with 539,000 copies being sold that week.

In its 9th week, the album held the top spot with another 8% increase in sales, moving 581,000 copies, and increased yet again in its tenth week selling 669,000 copies, and again holding the number one spot.

The album has set numerous Billboard 200 records, starting with being the first Christmas album to spend four consecutive weeks at No. 1 in the chart's 51-year history, as well as being only the second Christmas album to ever spend four weeks at No. 1, tying with Elvis Presley's Elvis' Christmas Album. It is also the first album to spend four consecutive weeks at No. 1 and experience a sales increase each of those weeks since No Doubt's Tragic Kingdom album did so in December 1996. The 669,000 copies the album sold in its tenth week was the biggest single week tally for a Christmas album since Kenny G's Miracles: The Holiday Album sold 819,000 copies in the Christmas week of 1994. By its tenth week the album had already become the best selling album of 2007, scanning 2.8 million copies in only a little over two months of release, a rarity in the fast declining physical album market of the past few years.

In its 11th week it became the first album of 2007 to hold No. 1 for 5 weeks, and the first Christmas album ever to hold No. 1 on the Billboard 200 for 5 weeks in a row. In that fifth week at No. 1 it outsold Mary J. Blige's Growing Pains, selling about 757,000 copies.

As of December 2022, Noël has sold a total of 6.32 million copies in the United States, according to Nielsen Music.

== Track listing ==
Standard and vinyl:

1. "Silent Night" – 4:11
2. "Little Drummer Boy" – 4:20 (featuring Andy McKee)
3. "I'll Be Home for Christmas" – 4:15
4. "Ave Maria" – 5:17
5. "Angels We Have Heard on High" – 3:32 (featuring Brian McKnight)
6. "The Christmas Song" – 3:54
7. "What Child Is This?" – 3:53
8. "The First Noel" – 4:34 (featuring Faith Hill)
9. "Petit Papa Noël" – 4:05
10. "It Came Upon the Midnight Clear" – 4:13
11. "Panis angelicus" – 4:19
12. "O Come, All Ye Faithful (Adeste Fideles)" – 4:38 (with the Mormon Tabernacle Choir)
13. "Thankful (Everytime I Look at You)" (David Foster, Andy Hill, John Reid, Richard Page) – 4:50

=== 2017 deluxe edition bonus tracks ===
1. "White Christmas" – 3:57
2. "Christmas Time Is Here" – 3:31 (featuring Tony Bennett)
3. "Have Yourself a Merry Little Christmas (Piano/Vocal Version)" – 4:05
4. "Happy Xmas (War Is Over)" – 3:27
5. "Believe" (Foster, Josh Groban, Alan Silvestri, Glen Ballard, Page) – 4:18
6. "The Mystery of Your Gift" (Groban, Brian Byrne, Page) – 4:25
7. "O Holy Night (Cantique de Noël)" – 4:49

== Charts ==
=== Weekly charts ===
Chart (2007)	Peak position
Australian Albums (ARIA)	33
Belgian Albums (Ultratop Wallonia)	25
Canadian Albums (Billboard)	1
Dutch Albums (Album Top 100)	26
French Albums (SNEP)	24
Norwegian Albums (VG-lista)	3
Swedish Albums (Sverigetopplistan)	4
Swiss Albums (Schweizer Hitparade)	69
US Billboard 200	1

=== Year-end charts ===
Chart (2007)	Position
French Albums (SNEP)	183
Swedish Albums (Sverigetopplistan)	29
US Billboard 200	135
Chart (2008)	Position
Canadian Albums (Billboard)	2
US Billboard 200	2
Chart (2010)	Position
US Billboard 200	85
Chart (2011)	Position
US Billboard 200	122
Chart (2012)	Position
US Billboard 200	171
Chart (2013)	Position
US Billboard 200	179
Chart (2014)	Position
US Billboard 200	175

== Certifications ==
Region	Certification	Certified units/sales
Canada (Music Canada)	6× Platinum	600,000^{^}
Norway (IFPI Norway)	Platinum	30,000^{*}
Sweden (GLF)	Gold	20,000^{^}
United Kingdom (BPI)	Silver	60,000^{‡}
United States (RIAA)	6× Platinum	6,320,000
^{*} Sales figures based on certification alone.^{^} Shipments figures based on certification alone.^{‡} Sales+streaming figures based on certification alone.

== Awards ==
Year	Ceremony	Award	Result
2008	Dove Awards	Christmas Album of the Year	Nominated
2009	Grammy Awards	Best Traditional Pop Vocal Album	Nominated

== See also ==
- List of Billboard Top Holiday Albums number ones of the 2000s
