= Eric Nam discography =

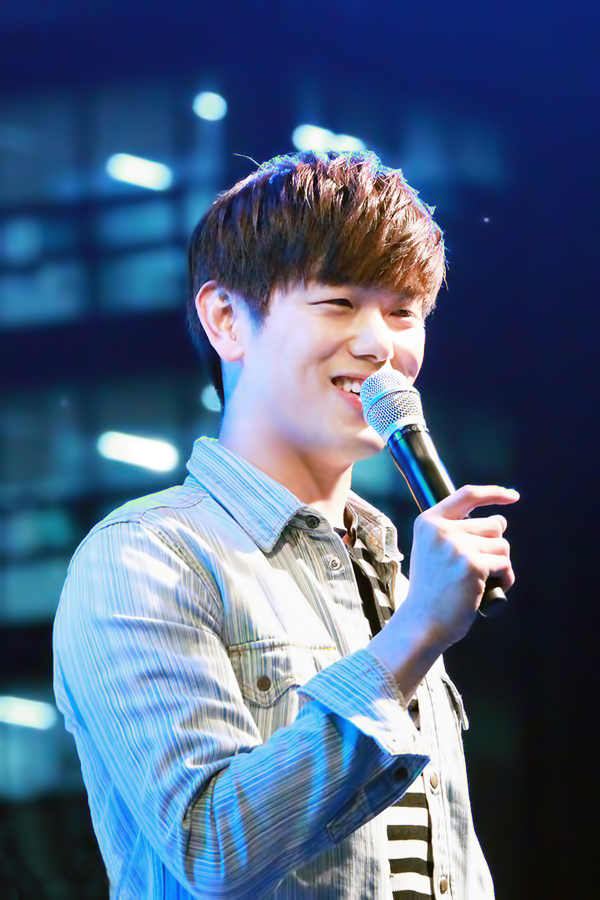
- Studio albums: 3
- EPs: 4
- Singles: 8
- Collaborations: 10
- Soundtrack appearances: 6
- Music videos: 18

American singer-songwriter Eric Nam has released two studio albums, four extended plays, eleven singles, eleven collaboration singles, eight appearances in soundtracks and eighteen music videos.

== Studio albums ==
Title	Album details	Peak chart positions	Sales
Title	Album details	KOR	Sales
Before We Begin	Released: November 14, 2019; Label: Stone Music Entertainment; Format: CD, digital download; Track listing: 1. "Come Through"; 2. "Love Die Young"; 3. "Congratulations" (feat. Marc E. Bassy); 4. "You're Sexy I'm Sexy"; 5. "How'm I Doing"; 6. "Wonder"; 7. "No Shame"; 8. "Runaway" (feat. Steve James)	23	KOR: 3,579
There and Back Again	Released: January 7, 2022; Label: The Eric Nam Company, Inc.; Format: CD, digital download; Track listing: 1. "Lost On Me"; 2. "I Don't Know You Anymore"; 3. "Any Other Way"; 4. "Wildfire"; 5. "What If"; 6. "Admit"; 7. "One Way Lover"	21	KOR: 5,122
House On A Hill	Released: September 8, 2023; Label: The Eric Nam Company, Inc.; Format: CD, digital download; Track listing: 1. "House On a Hill"; 2. "Don't Leave Yet"; 3. "Only for a Moment"; 4. "I Wish I Wasn't Me"; 5. "Undefined"; 6. "Sink or Swim"; 7. "Exist"; 8. "House on a Hill (feat. Em Beilhold)	42	KOR: 2,969
"—" denotes releases that did not chart or were not released in that region.

== Extended plays ==
Title	EP details	Peak chart positions	Sales
Title	EP details	KOR	Sales
Cloud 9	Released: January 23, 2013; Label: B2M Entertainment; Format: CD, digital download; Track listing: 1. "Travel – Prologue"; 2. "Heaven's Door" (천국의 문); 3. "Erase" (지우고 살아); 4. "Mirage" (신기루); 5. "Love Song"	22	KOR: 928+
Interview	Released: March 24, 2016; Label: B2M Entertainment, CJ E&M Music; Format: CD, digital download; Track listing: 1. "Interview"; 2. "Good For You"; 3. "Stop the Rain"; 4. "No Comment"; 5. "Good for You" (International ver.)	12	KOR: 2,727+
Honestly	Released: April 11, 2018; Label: B2M Entertainment, Stone Music Entertainment; Format: CD, digital download; Track listing: 1. "Honestly..." (솔직히); 2. "Potion" (feat. Woodie Gochild); 3. "This Is Not a Love Song"; 4. "Lose You"; 5. "Don't Call Me"; 6. "Honestly..." (솔직히) (Acoustic ver.) (CD only)	20	KOR: 2,865+
The Other Side	Released: July 30, 2020; Label: Stone Music Entertainment; Format: CD, digital download; Track listing: 1. "Trouble With You"; 2. "Paradise"; 3. "How You Been" (잘 지내지); 4. "Down For You"; 5. "Love Die Young" (Korean ver.)	14	KOR: 4,016
"—" denotes releases that did not chart or were not released in that region.

== Singles ==
=== As lead artist ===
Title	Year	Peak chart position			Sales (DL)	Album
Title	Year	KOR	KOR Hot 100	US World	Sales (DL)	Album
"Heaven's Door" (천국의 문)	2013	66	60	—	KOR: 64,720	Cloud 9
"Ooh Ooh" (우우) (featuring Hoya of Infinite)	2014	48	93	6	KOR: 34,194	Non-album singles
"Melt My Heart" (녹여줘)	2014	71	—	—	—	Non-album singles
"I'm OK" (괜찮아 괜찮아)	2015	32	—	—	KOR: 105,212	Non-album singles
"Good For You"	2016	33	—	—	KOR: 416,773	Interview
"Can't Help Myself" (못참겠어) (featuring Loco)	2016	20	—	4	KOR: 219,107	Non-album singles
"Hold Me" (놓지마)	2017	73	—	—	KOR: 23,976	Non-album singles
"Honestly..." (솔직히)	2018	95	—	—	—	Honestly
"Miss You"	2018	—	—	—	—	Non-album singles
"I Don't Miss You"	2018	—	—	—	—	Non-album singles
"Runaway"	2019	157	—	—	—	Non-album singles
"Love Die Young"	2019	—	—	—	—	Before We Begin
"Congratulations" (featuring Marc E. Bassy)	2019	—	—	—	—	Before We Begin
"Paradise"	2020	—	—	—	—	The Other Side
"I Don't Know You Anymore"	2021	—	—	—	—	There and Back Again
"Any Other Way"	2021	—	—	—	—	There and Back Again
"Lost On Me"	2022	—	—	—	—	There and Back Again
"—" denotes releases that did not chart or were not released in that region. Note: Billboard Korea K-Pop Hot 100 was introduced in August 2011 and discontinued in July 2014.

=== Collaborations ===
Title	Year	Peak chart position	Sales (DL)	Album
Title	Year	KOR	Sales (DL)	Album
"The Blue Night of Jeju Island" (with Namaste)	2012	137	—	Non-album single
"I Just Wanna" (Amber Liu featuring Eric Nam)	2015	63	—	Beautiful
"Dream" (featuring Park Ji-min of 15&)	2015	46	KOR: 62,965+	Non-album single
"Cave Me In" (with Gallant and Tablo)	2016	—	—	Non-album single
"Spring Love" (with Wendy of Red Velvet)	2016	7	KOR: 820,131+	SM Station Season 1
"Into You" (with KOLAJ)	2016	—	—	Non-album single
"Hello" (Seohyun featuring Eric Nam)	2017	—	—	Don't Say No
"You, Who?" (with Jeon Somi)	2017	16	KOR: 191,765+	Non-album single
"Idea of You" (with Arty)	2017	—	—	Non-album single
"Perhaps Love" (사랑인가요) (with Cheeze)	2017	14	KOR: 273,455	Your BGM Vol.1
"Your Side of the Bed" (Loote featuring Eric Nam)	2018	—	—	Your Side of the Bed (Remixes)
"Missing You" (Steve James featuring Eric Nam)	2019	—	—	Non-album singles
"Echo" (with Kshmr and Armaan Malik)	2021	—	—	Non-album singles
"—" denotes releases that did not chart or were not released in that region

=== Soundtrack appearances ===
Title	Year	Peak chart position	Sales (DL)	Album
Title	Year	KOR	Sales (DL)	Album
"Good-bye in Once Upon a Time"	2013	—	KOR: 28,849	Love in Memory OST Part. 2
"Cool Guy"	2014	—	—	Let's Eat OST
"In Your Days" (featuring Kim Kyu-jong)	2014	—	—	SOS Please Help Me OST
"A Second Is An Hour" (featuring Park Boram)	2015	—	KOR: 16,829	Flirty Boy and Girl OST
"Shower"	2016	—	KOR: 31,604	Uncontrollably Fond OST Part 12
"Before The Sun Sets"	2017	—	—	Mad Dog OST
"Float"	2018	—	—	Hotel Transylvania 3: Official Soundtrack
"The Night"	2018	—	—	Encounter OST Part 4
"Love Yourself"	2019	—	N/A	It’s Okay To Be Sensitive 2 OST Part 1
"—" denotes releases that did not chart or were not released in that region

== Other charted songs ==
Title	Year	Peak chart position	Sales (DL)	Album
Title	Year	KOR	Sales (DL)	Album
"Interview"	2016	89	KOR: 73,380+	Interview

== Music videos ==
Title	Year	Album	Language
"The Blue Night of Jeju Island" (with Namaste)	2012	Non-album single	Korean
"Heaven's Door"	2013	Cloud 9	Korean
"Ooh Ooh" (featuring Hoya of Infinite)	2014	Non-album singles	Korean
"Melt My Heart"	2014	Non-album singles	Korean
"I'm OK"	2015	Non-album singles	Korean
"Dream" (featuring Park Ji-min)	2015	Non-album singles	Korean
"Cave Me In" (with Gallant and Tablo)	2016	Non-album singles	English
"Spring Love" (with Wendy)	2016	S.M. Station Season 1	Korean
"Good For You"	2016	Interview	Korean
"Interview"	2016	Interview	Korean
"Into You" (with KOLAJ)	2016	Non-album singles	English
"Can't Help Myself"	2016	Non-album singles	Korean
"You, Who?" (with Jeon So-mi)	2017	Non-album singles	Korean
"Hold Me"	2017	Non-album singles	Korean
"Honestly…"	2018	Honestly	Korean
"Potion" (featuring Woodie Gochild)	2018	Honestly	Korean
"Runaway"	2019	Runaway	Korean
"Congratulations" (with Marc E. Bassy)	2019	Before We Begin	English
"Don't Leave Yet"	2023	House On A Hill	English
"Only for a Moment"	2023	House On A Hill	English
