= Believe (Josh Groban song) =

Single by Josh Groban

from the album The Polar Express: Original Motion Picture Soundtrack and Noël
- Released: November 2, 2004
- Recorded: 2004
- Genre: Christmas music
- Length: 4:18
- Label: Warner Bros.
- Composer: Alan Silvestri
- Lyricist: Glen Ballard

Josh Groban singles chronology
"Remember" (2004)	"Believe" (2004)	"You Are Loved (Don't Give Up)" (2006)

"Believe" is a song performed by Josh Groban. The lyrics and music were written by Glen Ballard and Alan Silvestri. The song is from the 2004 film The Polar Express and is included on the film soundtrack. The song is also included on the 2011 album Heavenly Christmas, performed by Jackie Evancho, and the deluxe edition of Groban's Noël album, marking the first time for inclusion on a Groban release.

== Background ==
The songwriters received a Grammy Award in the category Best Song Written for a Motion Picture, Television or Other Visual Media at the ceremony held in February 2006. "Believe" was also nominated for Best Original Song at the 77th Academy Awards in February 2005, with Groban and Beyoncé performing the song during the awards broadcast. The Oscar nod followed a Golden Globe nomination in the same category at the 62nd Golden Globe Awards.

== Cover versions ==
The song was covered by Dara Reneé for the High School Musical: The Musical: The Series: The Holiday Special soundtrack. Pentatonix covered the song in 2026 for the deluxe edition of their Christmas album Christmas in the City.

== Chart performance ==
The song "bubbled under" the Billboard Hot 100 chart in late 2004 and early 2005, reaching a peak position of #112. However, on the Billboard Hot Adult Contemporary Tracks chart, the song spent five weeks at the summit. This was Groban's fourth most popular song on the adult contemporary chart, under "To Where You Are" and "O Holy Night" in 2002 and "You Raise Me Up" earlier the same year.

Chart (2004–2005)	Peak position
Canadian Hot 100	86
US Billboard Bubbling Under Hot 100	12
US Billboard Adult Contemporary	1

Chart (2025)	Peak position
Norway (IFPI Norge)	97

== See also ==
- List of Billboard Adult Contemporary number ones of 2004 and 2005 (U.S.)
