= Harmony (Josh Groban album) =

2020 studio album by Josh Groban

Studio album by Josh Groban
- Released: November 20, 2020
- Recorded: Early 2020
- Genres: Operatic pop; classical; classical crossover; pop rock; tango
- Length: 51:14
- Label: Reprise
- Producers: Bernie Herms; Steve Jordan; Tommee Profitt; Federico Vindver; Humberto Gatica

Josh Groban chronology
Bridges Live: Madison Square Garden (2019)	Harmony (2020)	Gems (2025)

Josh Groban studio album chronology
Bridges (2018)	Harmony (2020)

Harmony is the ninth studio album by American singer-songwriter Josh Groban. The album was released on November 20, 2020, by Reprise Records. The deluxe version of the album was released on February 26, 2021 on all platforms.

== Track listing ==
No.	Title	Length
1.	"The World We Knew (Over and Over)"	3:17
2.	"Angels"	4:16
3.	"Celebrate Me Home"	5:02
4.	"Shape of My Heart" (duet with Leslie Odom Jr.)	4:45
5.	"Your Face"	4:12
6.	"Both Sides Now" (duet with Sara Bareilles)	4:02
7.	"She"	3:47
8.	"The Impossible Dream"	4:15
9.	"The First Time Ever I Saw Your Face"	4:31
10.	"It's Now or Never"	3:17
11.	"I Can't Make You Love Me"	4:50
12.	"The Fullest" (featuring Kirk Franklin)	4:57
Total length:		51:14

Japanese edition bonus tracks
No.	Title	Length
13.	"You Are Loved (Don't Give Up) [Live]"
14.	"Granted [Live]"
15.	"You Raise Me Up [Live]"

Deluxe edition bonus tracks
No.	Title	Length
13.	"Nature Boy"	2:56
14.	"I’ll Stand by You (duet with Helene Fischer)"	3:40
15.	"April Come She Will"	3:19
16.	"I Can See Clearly Now"	4:51
17.	"Con Los Años Que Me Quedan"	4:56
18.	"Solitaire"	4:29
Total length:		75:48

== Commercial performance ==
Harmony debuted at number 17 on the Billboard 200 chart, selling 25,000 units in its first week. In its second week, it dropped to #59, selling a further 14,000 units.

== Charts ==
Chart performance of Harmony
Chart (2020–2021)	Peak position
Australian Albums (ARIA)	26
Austrian Albums (Ö3 Austria)	70
Belgian Albums (Ultratop Flanders)	81
Belgian Albums (Ultratop Wallonia)	51
Canadian Albums (Billboard)	40
Dutch Albums (Album Top 100)	46
German Albums (Offizielle Top 100)	41
Hungarian Albums (MAHASZ)	7
Irish Albums (Official Charts)	31
New Zealand Albums (RMNZ)	33
Scottish Albums (Official Charts)	16
Swiss Albums (Schweizer Hitparade)	63
UK Albums (Official Charts)	24
US Billboard 200	17
