= Stages (Josh Groban album) =

Studio album by Josh Groban
- Released: April 28, 2015
- Recorded: November 16, 2013–February 5, 2015
- Studio: Capitol, Hollywood; United Recording, Los Angeles; Sony Scoring Stage, Los Angeles; Abbey Road, London; Blackbird, Nashville
- Genre: Operatic pop; classical; classical crossover; Musical theatre
- Length: 54:03
- Label: 143; Reprise
- Producer: Bernie Herms; Humberto Gatica; William Ross

Josh Groban chronology
All That Echoes (2013)	Stages (2015)	Stages Live (2016)

Josh Groban studio album chronology
All That Echoes (2013)	Stages (2015)	Bridges (2018)

Stages is the seventh studio album by American singer Josh Groban. Consisting of songs from Broadway musicals, it was released on April 28, 2015. The album has sold 502,000 copies in the US as of October 2015. Stages received a nomination for Best Traditional Pop Vocal Album at the 58th Annual Grammy Awards. Stages Live received a nomination in the same category a year later.

Professional ratings
Review scores
Source	Rating
AllMusic	3.5/5 stars
Broadway World	Positive
The Guardian	3/5 stars
Newsday	B+
Rolling Stone	2/5 stars

== Track listing ==
Standard version
No.	Title	Writer(s)	Length
1.	"Pure Imagination" (from Willy Wonka and the Chocolate Factory, 1971 (Note: The album's liner notes cite Pure Imagination as coming from Charlie and the Chocolate Factory, the title of the original book as well as its 2013 stage adaptation))	Leslie Bricusse; Anthony Newley	4:23
2.	"What I Did for Love" (from A Chorus Line, 1975)	Marvin Hamlisch; Edward Kleban	4:49
3.	"Bring Him Home" (from Les Misérables, 1980)	Claude-Michel Schönberg; Herbert Kretzmer	3:24
4.	"Le temps des cathédrales" (from Notre-Dame de Paris, 1998)	Riccardo Cocciante; Luc Plamondon	4:02
5.	"All I Ask of You" (feat. Kelly Clarkson) (from The Phantom of the Opera, 1986)	Andrew Lloyd Webber; Charles Hart; Richard Stilgoe	3:59
6.	"Try to Remember" (from The Fantasticks, 1960)	Harvey Schmidt; Tom Jones	4:40
7.	"Over the Rainbow" (from The Wizard of Oz, 1939)	Harold Arlen; Yip Harburg	4:27
8.	"Children Will Listen/Not While I'm Around (Medley)" (from Into the Woods, 1986; and Sweeney Todd: The Demon Barber of Fleet Street, 1979)	Stephen Sondheim	4:36
9.	"You'll Never Walk Alone" (from Carousel, 1945)	Richard Rodgers; Oscar Hammerstein II	4:28
10.	"Old Devil Moon" (feat. Chris Botti) (from Finian's Rainbow, 1947)	Burton Lane; Harburg	4:21
11.	"Finishing the Hat" (from Sunday in the Park with George, 1983)	Sondheim	3:08
12.	"If I Loved You" (feat. Audra McDonald) (from Carousel)	Rodgers; Hammerstein	4:16
13.	"Anthem" (from Chess, 1984)	Benny Andersson; Björn Ulvaeus; Tim Rice	3:28
Total length:			54:03

Deluxe edition bonus tracks
No.	Title	Writer(s)	Length
14.	"Gold Can Turn to Sand" (from Kristina, 1995)	Andersson; Ulvaeus; Kretzmer	4:14
15.	"Empty Chairs at Empty Tables" (from Les Misérables)	Schönberg; Kretzmer	4:12
Total length:			1:02:28

Target edition bonus tracks
No.	Title	Writer(s)	Length
16.	"If I Can't Love Her" (from Beauty and the Beast, 1994)	Alan Menken; Rice	4:54
17.	"Dulcinea" (from Man of La Mancha, 1965)	Mitch Leigh; Joe Darion	2:51
Total length:			1:10:14

== Personnel ==
- Josh Groban – vocals
- Chris Walden - arranger
- William Ross - arranger
- Chuck Berghofer – bass guitar
- Randy Waldman – piano
- Andy Selby – programming
- Tal Bergman – drums, additional percussion, drum programming
- Dean Parks – guitar
- Mary Webster – programming
- Ruslan Sirota – piano
- Vinnie Colaiuta – drums
- Jerry McPherson – electric guitar
- Craig Nelson – bass guitar
- Bernie Herms – keyboards, piano, producer
- Dan Needham – drums
- Alex Kovacs – programming
- Bryan Sutton – acoustic guitar

== Charts ==
=== Weekly charts ===
Chart (2015)	Peak position
Australian Albums (ARIA)	2
Austrian Albums (Ö3 Austria)	48
Belgian Albums (Ultratop Flanders)	52
Belgian Albums (Ultratop Wallonia)	14
Canadian Albums (Billboard)	2
Dutch Albums (Album Top 100)	5
Finnish Albums (Suomen virallinen lista)	21
French Albums (SNEP)	13
German Albums (Offizielle Top 100)	31
New Zealand Albums (RMNZ)	1
Norwegian Albums (VG-lista)	22
Scottish Albums (OCC)	1
Swiss Albums (Schweizer Hitparade)	13
UK Albums (OCC)	1
US Billboard 200	2

=== Year-end charts ===
Chart (2015)	Position
Australian Albums (ARIA)	35
Canadian Albums (Billboard)	46
New Zealand Albums (RMNZ)	21
UK Albums (OCC)	65
US Billboard 200	44

Chart (2016)	Position
US Billboard 200	198

== Certifications ==
Region	Certification	Certified units/sales
Australia (ARIA)	Gold	35,000^{^}
Canada (Music Canada)	Gold	40,000^{^}
New Zealand (RMNZ)	Gold	7,500^{^}
United Kingdom (BPI)	Gold	100,000^{‡}
United States (RIAA)	Gold	500,000^{‡}
^{^} Shipments figures based on certification alone.^{‡} Sales+streaming figures based on certification alone.
