= To Where You Are =

Single by Josh Groban

from the album Josh Groban
- Released: 2002
- Recorded: 2001
- Genre: Adult contemporary
- Length: 3:53
- Label: Warner
- Songwriters: Richard Marx; Linda Thompson
- Producer: Richard Marx

Josh Groban singles chronology
"To Where You Are" (2002)	"You're Still You" (2002)

"To Where You Are" is the debut single by American singer Josh Groban, from his 2001 self-titled debut album. It was written by Richard Marx and Linda Thompson and produced by Marx.

== Commercial performance ==
When released as a single in 2002, the song reached the Bubbling Under Hot 100 chart, peaking at No. 16 in September of that year. It was more successful on the Billboard Hot Adult Contemporary Tracks chart, where it entered the chart in April 2002 and eventually spent two weeks at the top of the chart in August. It remained on this chart for 36 weeks. In November 2008, the song spent a week on the UK Singles Chart at No. 94.

== Appearances in media ==
In 2001, Groban guest-starred on two episodes of the Fox television drama Ally McBeal. His latter appearance on the show was in the episode "Nine-One-One", where his character's mother had been killed and his father, a minister, had begun doubting the existence of God. Near the conclusion of the episode, Groban performed "To Where You Are" at a church service. Groban had been asked to return to the show after Fox received numerous letters and inquiries about the singer following his appearance in an earlier episode, "The Wedding", during which he had performed the song "You're Still You".

Groban has included "To Where You Are" in many of his concert sets in the years since the song was released, including at the Nobel Peace Prize Concert in Oslo, Norway in late 2002. The song appears on his first two live albums, Josh Groban in Concert and Live at the Greek, as well as on his 2008 greatest hits release, A Collection.

== Cover versions ==
Kristy Starling recorded this song for her debut album. Richard Marx produced this version as well.

Chloë Agnew from Celtic Woman also recorded this song for her album Walking in the Air, alongside Irish composer David Downes.

Other singers have performed "To Where You Are" on various talent-search reality television programs, including American Idol, America's Got Talent, Canadian Idol, The X Factor, Showtime (Croatia) and Pinoy Pop Superstar (Philippines). Former British The X Factor participants who have recorded their own versions of the song include G4, Rhydian, and Daniel Evans. Evans performed an emotional rendition in the sing-off stages of The X Factor in 2008 and it was featured on his debut album No Easy Way in 2010. The song also featured in the 2011 Britain's Got Talent final, where it was sung by eventual winner Jai McDowall. The song was also recorded in 2009 by nine-year-old Jackie Evancho, a soon-to-be singing sensation on America's Got Talent. It appears on her first album Prelude to a Dream, which was published privately.

Richard Marx also recorded and released a version for his 2010 acoustic album Stories to Tell.

In 2011, the song was recorded by Joe McElderry for his second studio album, Classic.

Also in 2011, the song was recorded by Mark Evans, a West End star in the musical Wicked, but this time it was covered in Welsh, becoming "Tu hwnt i'r sêr".

In 2014, the song was performed by Hugh Jackman and Richard Marx during Marx's "A Night Out with Friends" live sessions.

== Charts ==
=== Weekly charts ===
Chart (2002)	Peak position
Canada Radio (Nielsen BDS)	32
Canada Adult Contemporary (Nielsen BDS)	4
US Bubbling Under Hot 100 (Billboard)	16
US Adult Contemporary (Billboard)	1

Chart (2008)	Peak position
UK Singles (Official Charts)	94

Chart (2011)	Peak position
UK Singles (Official Charts)	53

=== Year-end charts ===
Chart (2002)	Position
US Adult Contemporary (Billboard)	8

== See also ==
- List of Billboard Adult Contemporary number ones of 2002
