= Weeping (song) =

Single by Bright Blue
- Released: 1987
- Genre: Protest song
- Songwriter(s): Dan Heymann

"Weeping" is an anti-apartheid protest song written by Dan Heymann in the mid-1980s, and first recorded by Heymann and the South African group Bright Blue in 1987. The song was a pointed response to the 1985 State of Emergency declared by President P.W. Botha, which resulted in "large-scale killings of unarmed and peaceful demonstrators against racial discrimination and segregation in South Africa." Defiantly, the song incorporated part of the melody to Nkosi Sikelel' iAfrika, the anthem of the anti-apartheid African National Congress. "Nkosi Sikelel' iAfrika" was banned at the time, and inclusion of even the melody violated the law. Today, "Nkosi Sikelel' iAfrika" is part of the national anthem of South Africa. The formerly illegal lyrics—"Nkosi sikelela, thina lusapho lwayo"—are now often sung when "Weeping" is recorded or performed.

In 1999, "Weeping" was voted "All-time favorite South African Song" by the readers of the South African Rock Encyclopedia.

== Covers ==
Over the years, a wide variety of artists have performed versions of the song. Here is a partial list.

- Bright Blue (Yesterday Night, 1987)
- Qkumba Zoo (Wake Up & Dream, 1996)
- Soweto String Quartet with guest vocalist Vusi Mahlasela (Renaissance, 1996)
- Coenie de Villiers (Solo)
- Kearsney College Choir (Road to the Olympics, 2000)
- James Stewart (Eklektik, 2002)
- Jinny Sagorin (It's For You, 2004)
- Soweto Gospel Choir (Blessed, 2004),
- Josh Groban (Awake, 2006)
  - Featuring the Ladysmith Black Mambazo group
- Louise Carver (Home Tour - Live, 2009)
- Drakensberg Boys Choir (Cantemus - Just Sing, 2012)
- Karen Zoid & Vusi Mahlasela (Live) [Republiek Van Zoid Africa: Season 2]
- Mango Groove (Faces to the Sun: Memories and Moments, 2016)
- Choni G (Single, 2019)

== See also ==
- Youtube video of Bright Blue
