= You Are Loved (Don't Give Up) =

Single by Josh Groban

from the album Awake
- Released: November 7, 2006
- Recorded: Early 2006 Metalworks Recording Paramount Studios
- Genre: Pop, orchestral rock, classical crossover
- Label: Reprise/143 Records
- Songwriter: Tawgs Salter
- Producer: David Foster

Josh Groban singles chronology
"Believe" (2004)	"You Are Loved (Don't Give Up)" (2006)	"Solo Por Ti" (2006)

"You Are Loved (Don't Give Up)" is the second track and the first single from Josh Groban's third album, Awake, released on November 7, 2006. The song's music and lyrics were written by Tawgs Salter. The single peaked at #9 on the Hot Adult Contemporary Tracks chart.

== Cultural references ==
- In The Simpsons episode "Lisa the Drama Queen", from the twentieth season of the show, Lisa and Juliet sing "You Are Loved (Don't Give Up)" while on the playground at their school.

== Charts ==
=== Weekly charts ===
Chart (2006–2007)	Peak position
Canada AC (Billboard)	2
US Bubbling Under Hot 100 (Billboard)	10
US Adult Contemporary (Billboard)	9

=== Year-end charts ===
Chart (2007)	Position
US Adult Contemporary (Billboard)	30
