= Josh Groban (album) =

Studio album by Josh Groban
- Released: November 20, 2001
- Recorded: 1999–2001
- Genre: Classical crossover
- Length: 56:20
- Labels: 143; Reprise
- Producers: Walter Afanasieff; David Foster; Rhys Fulber; Humberto Gatica; Jeremy Lubbock; Marco Marinangeli; Richard Marx; Tony Renis; William Ross

Josh Groban chronology
Josh Groban (2001)	Josh Groban in Concert (2002)

Josh Groban studio album chronology
Josh Groban (2001)	Closer (2003)

Josh Groban is the debut studio album by singer Josh Groban. The track "You're Still You" charted at No. 10 on the Billboard Hot Adult Contemporary Tracks chart, and "To Where You Are" charted at No. 1 on the same chart. As of October 2015, the album has sold 5.2 million in the U.S.

Professional ratings
Review scores
Source	Rating
Allmusic	3.5/5 stars
Rolling Stone	2.5/5 stars

== Track listing ==
No.	Title	Writer(s)	Producer(s)	Length
1.	"Alla luce del sole"	Maurizio Fabrizio, Guido Morra	David Foster	4:20
2.	"Gira con me questa notte"	Lucio Quarantotto, David Foster, Walter Afanasieff	Foster, Afanasieff	4:42
3.	"You're Still You"	Linda Thompson, Ennio Morricone	Foster, Tony Renis^{[a]}	3:40
4.	"Cinema Paradiso (Se)"	Andrea Morricone, Alessio de Sensi	Marco Marinangeli, William Ross	3:25
5.	"To Where You Are"	Richard Marx, Thompson	Marx	3:53
6.	"Aléjate" (Just Walk Away)"	Albert Hammond, Marti Sharron, Claudia Brant	Foster, Humberto Gatica	4:50
7.	"Canto alla vita" (featuring The Corrs)	Cheope, Antonio Galbiati, Giuseppe Dettori	Rhys Fulber, Foster^{[a]}	4:16
8.	"Let Me Fall (From Cirque du Soleil's Quidam)"	James Corcoran, Benoît Jutras	Fulber	4:12
9.	"Vincent (Starry, Starry Night)"	Don McLean	Foster	4:39
10.	"Un amore per sempre"	Afanasieff, Marco Marinangeli	Foster	4:26
11.	"Home to Stay"	Amy Foster-Skylark, Jeremy Lubbock	Foster, Lubbock	4:33
12.	"Jesu, Joy of Man's Desiring" (featuring Lili Haydn)	J.S. Bach	Foster	5:01
13.	"The Prayer" (with Charlotte Church)	Carole Bayer Sager, D. Foster	Foster	4:25
Total length:				56:20

Japanese Edition
No.	Title	Writer(s)	Length
14.	"Mia per Sempre"	Guido de Angelis, Maurizio de Angelis	5:12

Deluxe Edition (20th anniversary)
No.	Title	Writer(s)	Length
14.	"Mia per Sempre"	Guido de Angelis, Maurizio de Angelis	5:12
15.	"Roma Nun Fa' La Stupida Stasera"		3:57

Notes

- ^a signifies an additional producer

== Charts ==
=== Weekly charts ===
Chart (2001–03)	Peak position
Australian Albums (ARIA)	28
Danish Albums (Hitlisten)	29
Dutch Albums (Album Top 100)	8
Finnish Albums (Suomen virallinen lista)	6
French Albums (SNEP)	50
New Zealand Albums (RMNZ)	4
Norwegian Albums (VG-lista)	6
Swedish Albums (Sverigetopplistan)	7
UK Albums (Official Charts)	28
US Billboard 200	8
US Top Classical Albums (Billboard)	1

=== Year-end charts ===
Year-end chart performance for Josh Groban
Chart (2002)	Position
Canadian Albums (Nielsen SoundScan)	12
New Zealand Albums (RMNZ)	35
Swedish Albums (Sverigetopplistan)	63
US Billboard 200	29
Worldwide Albums (IFPI)	26

Chart (2003)	Position
Dutch Albums (Album Top 100)	76
US Billboard 200	26

== Certifications ==
Region	Certification	Certified units/sales
Argentina (CAPIF)	Gold	20,000^{^}
Australia (ARIA)	Platinum	70,000^{^}
Canada (Music Canada)	4× Platinum	400,000^{^}
Finland (Musiikkituottajat)	Gold	15,107
New Zealand (RMNZ)	Gold	7,500^{^}
Sweden (GLF)	Gold	40,000^{^}
United Kingdom (BPI)	Gold	100,000^{^}
United States (RIAA)	5× Platinum	5,000,000^{‡}
^{^} Shipments figures based on certification alone.^{‡} Sales+streaming figures based on certification alone.
