= Awake (Josh Groban album) =

Studio album by Josh Groban
- Released: November 7, 2006
- Recorded: Late 2004–06
- Genres: Operatic pop; classical; classical crossover; pop rock
- Labels: 143; Reprise
- Producers: Glen Ballard; David Foster; Humberto Gatica; Josh Groban; Imogen Heap; Eric Mouquet; Tawgs Salter; Guy Sigsworth; Marius de Vries

Josh Groban chronology
Live at the Greek (2004)	Awake (2006)	Noël (2007)

Josh Groban studio album chronology
Closer (2003)	Awake (2006)	Noël (2007)

Professional ratings
Review scores
Source	Rating
Allmusic	4/5 stars

Awake is the third studio album by American singer-songwriter Josh Groban. Announced on September 13, 2006, it is a follow-up to his multi-platinum album Closer. Awake was released on November 7, 2006.

The album was certified 2× platinum in the US by the RIAA on January 31, 2008, and has sold 2.3 million albums as of October 2015. It is the third top selling classical album of the 2000s in the US, according to Nielsen SoundScan.

== Album information ==
The album's first single is "You Are Loved (Don't Give Up)". The album features producers Imogen Heap, Marius De Vries, Guy Sigsworth, Eric Mouquet, Glen Ballard, and David Foster (who also worked on previous Groban works). As with all Josh Groban albums, songs on Awake are performed in English, Italian and Spanish. The album offered a more modern vibe to his voice by using more instruments aside from the occasional classic piano accompaniment in his previous albums. The album also featured Groban's head voice technique as evident in most of the tracks in the album.

Awake additionally features tracks that credit Groban's recent movements in South Africa. "Lullaby" and "Weeping" (album tracks 11 and 12) are sung by him in conjunction with the renowned South African musical group Ladysmith Black Mambazo, with further contributions from Vusi Mahlasela and Dave Matthews. "Weeping", a pop song originally composed in South Africa, is thematically oriented with the country's history of Apartheid. "Lullaby" is a track included in the album as a supplement to "Weeping", considered one of the album's major highlights. "Lullaby" is meant to flow gaplessly into "Weeping", but the rest of the album uses gaps. The song "Now or Never" was produced and co-written with English singer-songwriter Imogen Heap.

"You Are Loved (Don't Give Up)" peaked at No. 9 on the Hot Adult Contemporary Tracks chart, while "February Song" and "Awake" each peaked at No. 13 on the same chart.

== Track listing ==
Standard version
No.	Title	Writer(s)	Producer(s)	Length
1.	"Mai"	Leo Z., Andrew Sandri, Marco Marinangeli	Marius de Vries	4:35
2.	"You Are Loved (Don't Give Up)"	Thomas Salter	Tawgs Salter, Guy Sigsworth^{[a]}	4:49
3.	"Un día llegará"	Oksana Grigorieva, Claudia Brant	David Foster, Humberto Gatica	4:18
4.	"February Song"	Josh Groban, Marius de Vries, John Ondrasik	Vries	5:12
5.	"L'ultima notte"	Marinangeli	Foster, Gatica^{[b]}	4:22
6.	"So She Dances"	Asher Lenz, Adam Crossley	Vries	4:54
7.	"In Her Eyes"	Michael Hunter Ochs, Jeff Cohen, Andy Selby	Foster, Gatica^{[b]}	4:54
8.	"Solo por ti"	Mark Hammond, Marinangeli	Vries	3:59
9.	"Now or Never"	Groban, Imogen Heap	Heap	3:38
10.	"Un giorno per noi"	Nino Rota, Lawrence Kusik, Edward A. Snyder, Alfredo Rapetti	Foster, Gatica^{[b]}	5:11
11.	"Lullaby" (featuring Ladysmith Black Mambazo)	Groban, Dave Matthews, Jochem van der Saag	Glen Ballard, Groban	2:32
12.	"Weeping" (featuring Ladysmith Black Mambazo and Vusi Mahlasela)	Dan Heymann	Ballard, Groban^{[b]}	4:45
13.	"Machine" (featuring Herbie Hancock)	Groban, Eric Mouquet, Dave Bassett	Groban, Mouquet	4:54

Notes

- ^a signifies a vocal producer
- ^b signifies a co-producer

=== Bonus track listing ===
1. "You Raise Me Up" (Brendan Graham, Rolf Løvland) (European bonus track) – 4:50
2. "Verità" (Richard Page, Per Magnusson, David Kreuger) (Special edition bonus track) – 4:01
3. "Awake" (Groban, Mouquet, Salter) (Special edition bonus track) – 5:11
4. "Smile" (Charlie Chaplin, Geoffrey Parsons, John Turner) (Website exclusive) – 3:43

== Personnel ==
- Josh Groban – vocals, drums, keyboards, piano, backing vocals
- Vinnie Colaiuta – drums
- Joel Shearer – guitar
- Frank Ricotti – percussion, vibraphone
- Jochem van der Saag – synthesizer, programming
- Glen Ballard – keyboards
- Blair Sinta – percussion
- Michael Thompson – guitar
- Ian Thomas – drums
- Eric Mouquet – keyboards
- Nathan East – bass guitar
- Chris Elliott – piano, dulcimer
- Andy Bradfield – mixing
- Vincent Nguini – guitar
- Sean Hurley – drums
- Russell Powell – guitar
- Bakithi Kumalo – bass guitar, backing vocals
- David Foster – keyboards
- Marius de Vries – keyboards, programming, piano
- Ramon Stagnaro – guitar
- Matt Chamberlain – drums
- Herbie Hancock – electric piano
- Tim Pierce – guitar
- Jason Boshoff – programming
- Anton Fig – drums
- Trevor Barry – bass guitar
- Kaitlyn Barton – tambourine
- Zac Rae – keyboards
- Alexis Smith – additional programming
- Dean Parks – guitar
- Fiona Hibbert – harp
- Imogen Heap – piano, programming, array mbira
- Anna Ross – backing vocals
- Ladysmith Black Mambazo – backing vocals
- Vusi Mahlasela – backing vocals
- Susie Suh – backing vocals

== Charts ==
=== Weekly charts ===
Chart (2006–2007)	Peak position
Australian Albums (ARIA)	5
Austrian Albums (Ö3 Austria)	49
Belgian Albums (Ultratop Flanders)	67
Belgian Albums (Ultratop Wallonia)	5
Canadian Albums (Billboard)	1
Dutch Albums (Album Top 100)	25
French Albums (SNEP)	5
German Albums (Offizielle Top 100)	27
Irish Albums (IRMA)	16
Malaysian International Albums (RIM)	14
New Zealand Albums (RMNZ)	29
Norwegian Albums (VG-lista)	11
Portuguese Albums (AFP)	16
Scottish Albums (Official Charts)	12
South African Albums (RISA)	1
Swedish Albums (Sverigetopplistan)	7
Swiss Albums (Schweizer Hitparade)	33
UK Albums (Official Charts)	12
US Billboard 200	2
US Top Classical Albums (Billboard)	1

=== Year-end charts ===
Chart (2006)	Position
Belgian Albums (Ultratop Wallonia)	73
Swedish Albums (Sverigetopplistan)	89

Chart (2007)	Position
Australian Albums (ARIA)	94
Belgian Albums (Ultratop Wallonia)	55
French Albums (SNEP)	165
UK Albums (OCC)	120
US Billboard 200	17

== Certifications ==
Region	Certification	Certified units/sales
Australia (ARIA)	Gold	35,000^{^}
Belgium (BRMA)	Gold	25,000^{*}
Canada (Music Canada)	2× Platinum	200,000^{^}
France (SNEP)	Gold	75,000^{*}
Ireland (IRMA)	Gold	7,500^{^}
New Zealand (RMNZ)	Gold	7,500^{^}
Norway (IFPI Norway)	Platinum	40,000^{*}
Portugal (AFP)	Gold	10,000^{^}
South Africa (RISA)	Platinum	40,000^{*}
United Kingdom (BPI)	Gold	189,412
United States (RIAA)	2× Platinum	2,300,000
^{*} Sales figures based on certification alone.^{^} Shipments figures based on certification alone.
