= Closer (Josh Groban album) =

Studio album by Josh Groban
- Released: November 11, 2003
- Recorded: Late 2001–mid-2003
- Genre: Classical; operatic pop; classical crossover; pop rock
- Length: 58:56
- Label: 143; Reprise
- Producer: Walter Afanasieff; Klaus Derendorf; David Foster; Mark Hammond; Leo Z; Mauro Malavasi; Eric Mouquet; Mark Portmann; Jochem van der Saag

Josh Groban chronology
Josh Groban in Concert (2002)	Closer (2003)	Live at the Greek (2004)

Josh Groban studio album chronology
Josh Groban (2001)	Closer (2003)	Awake (2006)

Professional ratings
Review scores
Source	Rating
AllMusic	4/5 stars
Boston Globe	(favorable)
The Village Voice	C+

Closer is the second studio album by vocalist Josh Groban, released in November 2003. Much like his first studio album, half of this album's songs are sung in English, with the remainder sung in other European languages (Italian, Spanish and French). Closer was the top selling classical album of the 2000s in the US, according to Nielsen SoundScan.

The album debuted at No. 4 on the Billboard 200 albums chart, selling about 375,000 copies in its first week. In January 2004, the album rose from #11 to No. 1 in its ninth week on the chart, selling about 110,000 copies that week. This followed a sales campaign by Target.

Closer reached a peak position of #25 on the ARIA Albums Chart of Australia. On June 13, 2007, it re-entered the chart at No. 39. As of October 2015, the album had sold over 6.1 million copies in the US. The track "You Raise Me Up" charted at No. 73 on the Billboard Hot 100 and #1 on the Adult Contemporary chart. The track "Remember When It Rained" reached No. 15 on the AC chart.

== Track listing ==
No.	Title	Writer(s)	Producer(s)	Length
1.	"Oceano"	Leo Z, Andrea Sandri, Mauro Malavasi	David Foster, Leo Z, Malavasi	4:03
2.	"My Confession"	Richard Page	Foster, Jochem van der Saag^{[a]}	4:56
3.	"Mi mancherai (Il postino)" (featuring Joshua Bell)	Luis Bacalov, Marco Marinangeli	Foster	6:04
4.	"Si volvieras a mí"	Klaus Derendorf, Mark Portmann, Claudia Brant	Foster, Derendorf^{[a]}, Portmann^{[a]}	4:19
5.	"When You Say You Love Me"	Mark Hammond, Robin Scoffield	Foster, Hammond^{[a]}	4:32
6.	"Per te"	Marinangeli, Walter Afanasieff, Josh Groban	Afanasieff	4:16
7.	"All'improvviso amore"	Foster, Paul Schwartz, Frank Musker, Kaballa	Foster, Schwartz^{[b]}	3:38
8.	"Broken Vow"	Afanasieff, Lara Fabian	Foster, Afanasieff^{[b]}, William Ross^{[b]}	4:34
9.	"Caruso"	Lucio Dalla	Foster	5:07
10.	"Remember When It Rained"	Groban, Éric Mouquet	Mouquet	4:41
11.	"Hymne à l'amour"	Edith Piaf, Marguerite Monnot, Geoffrey Parsons	Foster	4:04
12.	"You Raise Me Up"	Rolf Løvland, Brendan Graham	Foster	4:52
13.	"Never Let Go" (featuring Deep Forest)	Deep Forest, Groban, Mouquet	Mouquet	3:52
Total length:				58:56

Japanese Edition/South African Edition
No.	Title	Writer(s)	Length
14.	"She's Out of My Life"	Tom Bahler	3:46
Total length:			1:02:42

Special Edition/European Limited Edition
No.	Title	Writer(s)	Length
14.	"Mi Morena"	Martin Page	4:39
15.	"She's Out of My Life"	Tom Bahler	3:46
Total length:			1:07:11

Website Exclusive
No.	Title	Writer(s)	Length
16.	"You're the Only Place"	Billy Mann, Afanasieff	4:55
17.	"My December"	Linkin Park	5:02

Notes

- ^a signifies an additional producer
- ^b signifies a co-producer

== TV appearances ==
- Good Morning America – November 11, 2003
- The View – November 13, 2003

== Charts ==
=== Weekly charts ===
Chart (2003–2023)	Peak position
Australian Albums (ARIA)	25
Austrian Albums (Ö3 Austria)	10
Canadian Albums (Billboard)	2
Dutch Albums (Album Top 100)	38
French Albums (SNEP)	47
German Albums (Offizielle Top 100)	13
Hungarian Physical Albums (MAHASZ)	19
New Zealand Albums (RMNZ)	9
Norwegian Albums (VG-lista)	2
Singaporean Albums (RIAS)	1
South African Albums (RISA)	4
Swedish Albums (Sverigetopplistan)	27
Swiss Albums (Schweizer Hitparade)	44
UK Albums (OCC)	91
US Billboard 200	1

=== Year-end charts ===
Chart (2003)	Position
US Billboard 200	187
Worldwide Albums (IFPI)	25
Chart (2004)	Position
New Zealand Albums (RMNZ)	46
Swedish Albums (Sverigetopplistan)	98
US Billboard 200	3
Worldwide Albums (IFPI)	32
Chart (2005)	Position
US Billboard 200	78

== Certifications ==
Region	Certification	Certified units/sales
Argentina (CAPIF)	Gold	20,000^{^}
Australia (ARIA)	Platinum	70,000^{^}
Canada (Music Canada)	6× Platinum	600,000^{‡}
Ireland (IRMA)	Gold	7,500^{^}
New Zealand (RMNZ)	Platinum	15,000^{^}
South Africa (RISA)	Platinum	50,000^{*}
Sweden (GLF)	Gold	30,000^{^}
United Kingdom (BPI)	Gold	100,000^{^}
United States (RIAA)	6× Platinum	6,100,000
^{*} Sales figures based on certification alone.^{^} Shipments figures based on certification alone.^{‡} Sales+streaming figures based on certification alone.
