= Josh Groban =

American singer and actor (born 1981)

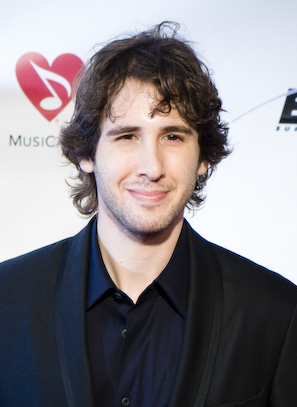
- Groban at the 2009 Grammys charity auction

Background information
- Born: Joshua Winslow Groban; February 27, 1981 (age 45); Los Angeles, California, U.S.
- Genres: Easy listening; vocal; classical crossover; gospel; operatic pop
- Occupations: Singer; actor
- Years active: 1997–present
- Labels: 143; Reprise; Warner Bros.
- Website: joshgroban.com

Signature
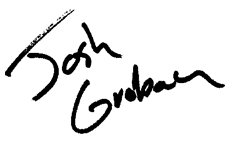

Joshua Winslow Groban (born February 27, 1981) is an American singer, songwriter and actor. His first four solo albums have been certified multi-platinum, and he was charted in 2007 as the number-one best selling artist in the United States, with over 22.3 million records. As of 2022, he had sold over 25 million records worldwide.

Groban originally studied acting, but switched to singing as his voice developed. He attended the Los Angeles County High School for the Arts, a free public school on the campus of California State University, Los Angeles, where students receive a conservatory-style education. David Foster called him to stand in for Andrea Bocelli to rehearse a duet, "The Prayer", with Celine Dion at the rehearsal for the 1999 Grammy Awards. Rosie O'Donnell immediately invited him to appear on her talk show. Foster asked him to sing at California Governor Gray Davis's 1999 inauguration. He was cast on Ally McBeal by the show's creator, David E. Kelley, performing "You're Still You", later released on his debut album, for the 2001 season four finale.

After his appearance in two professional productions of Chess, Groban made his Broadway debut in 2016 as Pierre Bezukhov in the musical Natasha, Pierre & The Great Comet of 1812, to critical acclaim and a Tony Award nomination. In 2018, he received two Primetime Emmy Award nominations for his performance at the 72nd Tony Awards, and starred in the limited series The Good Cop. He also appeared in television series and films, such as Crazy, Stupid, Love and Muppets Most Wanted.

In 2022, Groban portrayed the Beast in the television special Beauty and the Beast: A 30th Celebration. He returned to Broadway in 2023 playing the title character in a revival of Sweeney Todd: The Demon Barber of Fleet Street, for which he earned his second Tony Award nomination.

== Early life and education ==
Groban was born on February 27, 1981, in Los Angeles, to Jack Groban, a businessman, and Melinda "Lindy" Groban (née Johnston), a school teacher. His father is a descendant of Jewish immigrants from Poland and Ukraine, but converted to Christianity from Judaism upon marrying Melinda. His mother's ancestry is English, German, Norwegian, and one quarter Ashkenazi Jewish. His parents are Episcopalians.

Josh Groban first sang in public when he was in the seventh grade. His music teacher chose him to sing a solo of "'S Wonderful" at the school's cabaret night, where he sang alone on stage for the first time. At this time, he was more focused on acting, playing Tevye in his high school's production of Fiddler on the Roof. In the summers of 1997 and 1998, he went to the Interlochen Center for the Arts Camp in Michigan, majoring in musical theater, and began taking vocal lessons. He attended the Los Angeles County High School for the Arts as a theater major and graduated in 1999. He was admitted to and briefly attended Carnegie Mellon University in Pittsburgh, intent on studying musical theater. Four months into his first semester, Groban was offered a recording contract and left college to pursue a singing career.

== Career ==
=== 1997–2001: Debut ===
In late 1997, the 16-year-old Groban was introduced by his vocal coach, Seth Riggs, to producer and arranger David Foster and future manager Brian Avnet. At the time, Groban had no recording experience and was preparing for his studies at Carnegie Mellon. Groban worked for David Foster as a rehearsal singer on a series of high-profile events, including the January 1999 California gubernatorial inauguration of Gray Davis and the 1999 Grammy Awards where—as a stand-in for Andrea Bocelli—he rehearsed Foster's "The Prayer" with Céline Dion. According to Avnet, Groban was very nervous about standing in for Bocelli and had to be talked into it; his performance prompted the show hostess, Rosie O'Donnell, to ask him to appear on her show the following week, which in turn led to an appearance on Ally McBeal. Creator David E. Kelley wrote the character Malcolm Wyatt for Groban in the season finale, aired in May 2001. His performance, including the song "You're Still You", was so popular that the show received upwards of 8,000 emails from viewers. The song was included on his eponymous debut album, released in November 2001. Groban was asked to return the next season to reprise his role as Wyatt, performing "To Where You Are", airing just two weeks after his debut album was released. Avnet claims this sequence of events effectively got Groban's career off the ground.

Groban was offered a recording contract at Warner Bros. Records through Foster's 143 Records imprint. Avnet told HitQuarters that Warner Bros. initially proved resistant to the deal because "They were afraid they wouldn't be able to get a voice like that on radio." Explaining his reasons for signing the artist, Foster said: "I love his natural ability in the pop and rock arena, but I love his sense of classics even more. He's a true musical force to be reckoned with." Under Foster's influence, Groban's first album focused more on classics such as "Gira Con Me Questa Notte" and "Alla Luce Del Sole".

Groban performed "There For Me" with Sarah Brightman on her 2000–01 La Luna World Tour, and was featured on her "La Luna" concert DVD. He recorded "For Always" with Lara Fabian for the movie soundtrack of A.I. Artificial Intelligence (2001). He performed in many benefit shows, including "The Andre Agassi Grand Slam Event For Children," alongside Elton John, Stevie Wonder, Don Henley, and Robin Williams; "Muhammad Ali's Fight Night Foundation" which honored Michael J. Fox and others; "The Family Celebration" (2001), which was co-hosted by President Bill Clinton and Hillary Clinton, and David E. Kelley and Michelle Pfeiffer; and Michael Milken's CapCure event, which raised funds for cancer research.

His self-titled debut album Josh Groban was released on November 20, 2001. Over the next year it went from gold status to double-platinum.

=== 2002–2005: Closer ===
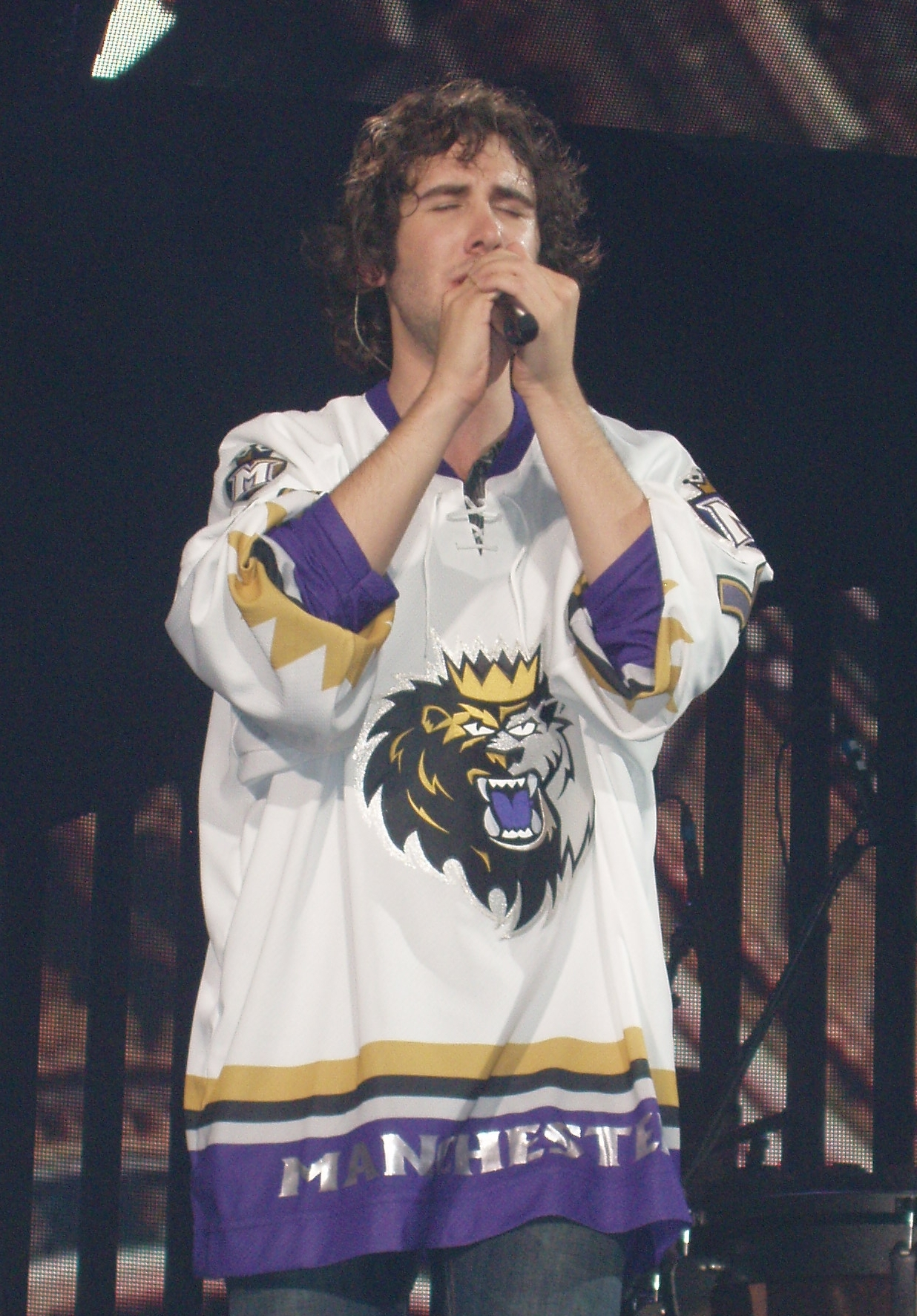
Groban in concert at the Verizon Wireless Arena in Manchester, New Hampshire, July 2007; he is wearing a Manchester Monarchs hockey jersey

On February 24, 2002, Groban performed "The Prayer" with Charlotte Church at the closing ceremonies of the Winter Olympics in Salt Lake City, and by November, he had his own PBS special titled "Josh Groban In Concert" (2002). In December 2002, he performed "To Where You Are" and sang "The Prayer" in a duet with Sissel Kyrkjebø at the Nobel Peace Prize Concert in Oslo, Norway. He joined The Corrs, Ronan Keating, Sting, Lionel Richie, and others for a Christmas performance at the Vatican. In 2003, Groban performed at the David Foster concert for World Children's Day, singing "The Prayer" with Celine Dion and the finale song, "Aren't They All Our Children?" with artists including Yolanda Adams, Nick Carter, Enrique Iglesias, and Celine Dion.

Groban's second album Closer, produced and written by Foster, was released on November 11, 2003. Groban said he believed that this album was a better reflection of him, and his audience would be able to get a better idea of his personality from listening to it.

What most people know about me, they know through my music. This time, I've tried to open that door as wide as possible. These songs are a giant step closer to who I really am and what my music is all about. Hence the title.

Two months after Closer was released, it rose on the Billboard charts from number 11 to number one. Groban's cover of "You Raise Me Up" became his third most popular song on the adult contemporary charts as of March 2004. Later that year, he also performed the song "Remember" (with Tanja Tzarovska) on the Troy soundtrack, "Believe" on the soundtrack to the 2004 animated film The Polar Express and a cover of Linkin Park's "My December".

In the summer of 2004, Groban returned to Interlochen, performing and discussing his earlier experiences with local residents and campers. On November 30, 2004, his second live DVD, Live At The Greek, was released; it was also shown as a Great Performances special on PBS. In the same year, Groban performed "Remember When It Rained", backed by a full orchestra, at the American Music Awards, where he was nominated for Favorite Male Artist in the pop category; he was also nominated for a People's Choice Award. His recording of "Believe" secured an Academy Award nomination in 2005 for the songwriters Glen Ballard and Alan Silvestri, earning a Grammy in the category Best Song Written for a Motion Picture, Television or Other Visual Media at the Grammy Awards in February 2006 .

=== 2005–2010: Awake ===
Groban earned his first Grammy nomination in 2005 for his single "You Raise Me Up" in the Best Male Pop Vocal Performance category. During the first week of September 2006, Groban's single entitled "You Are Loved (Don't Give Up)" was released exclusively on AOL's First Listen. His third studio album Awake was officially released on November 7, 2006. Groban performed "You Are Loved (Don't Give Up)" as well as two other tracks from Awake at his recording session for Live from Abbey Road at Abbey Road Studios on October 26, 2006. On that album, Groban also collaborated on the single "Now or Never" with British musician and songwriter Imogen Heap. He performed two tracks with the South African group Ladysmith Black Mambazo, "Lullaby" and "Weeping". Groban's "Awake" world tour visited 71 cities between February and August 2007, and toured Australia and the Philippines with Lani Misalucha as his special guest in October 2007. He performed a duet with Barbra Streisand ("All I Know of Love") and with Mireille Mathieu ("Over the Rainbow"). As to his future, Groban was open to a plethora of possibilities. He said, "I am fortunate enough to have had many really big moments in my career. I think the mistake a lot of people in my position make is to always search for the next big thing. I am looking forward to playing some small theaters. I'm looking forward to writing more. I want to delve further into my acting career and explore some of the film and TV opportunities that I haven't had time for. My outlook is to expect the unexpected... when the next step comes, I'm prepared to take it."

=== 2010–2015: Illuminations; All That Echoes ===
Groban finished his fifth studio album, entitled Illuminations, and the album was released on November 15, 2010. Most of the songs on the album are about "specific situations that I've had where love has existed and ultimately failed," Groban told The New York Times, adding: "And other songs are about the quest, and it just not working out." Groban wrote 11 of the 13 songs on the album. The first single from the album, "Hidden Away", was made available for free download via Facebook on September 8. "For me to sit in a room with a piano in one take with some of Johnny Cash's musicians—that was totally new for me." Josh added. "and I think that excitement is on the record." On October 12, a second single from the upcoming album, "Você Existe Em Mim", was made available on iTunes. The song is sung in Portuguese and was written by Brazilian artist Carlinhos Brown. The Washington Post said: "Illuminations" is not a revelation, but it offers a perfectly fine, and often quite lovely, glimpse at a pop-classical crossover artist in the middle of crossing over". Groban plans on making one more record with Rick Rubin. Beginning May 12, 2011, and continuing through December of that year, Groban undertook the 81-city Straight to You Tour to promote Illuminations, encompassing appearances in North America, Europe, and South Africa.

Groban's sixth studio album, All That Echoes, was released on February 5, 2013, debuting at number one by selling 141,000 copies. He promoted the album with the All That Echoes World Tour in 2013. A year later, he embarked on his Summer Symphony Tour.

=== 2015–2017: Stages and Broadway debut ===
On Groban's Facebook page in March 2015, he announced the release of the album Stages, consisting of covers of songs from Broadway musicals. The album was released on April 28, 2015.

Starting October 18, 2016, Groban performed on Broadway as Pierre Bezukhov in Natasha, Pierre & The Great Comet of 1812, an electropop opera by composer Dave Malloy based on War and Peace. The production was nominated for twelve Tony Awards. For his performance as Pierre, Groban was nominated for the 2017 Tony Award for Best Actor in a Leading Role in a Musical. His final performance as Pierre was on July 2, 2017, with Malloy replacing him for a week before Okieriete Onaodowan took over the role.

In 2017, he released a book titled STAGE to STAGE, My Journey to Broadway. The book detailed the creation of Groban's album and tour, Stages, as well as preparing and performing in The Great Comet of 1812. The book featured pictures both on and off stage from his performances in Stages and Great Comet, as well as messages from Groban and Malloy. Groban performed the song "Evermore" during the end credits of the 2017 Disney film Beauty and the Beast.

=== 2018: Bridges ===
On March 12, 2018, tour dates were announced for Groban's Bridges Tour with special guest Idina Menzel. The US leg of the tour began on October 18, 2018, in Duluth, Georgia which is northwest of Atlanta concluding at Madison Square Garden in New York City on November 18. The European leg of the tour began on December 12 at the O2 Arena in London and concluded on December 18 in Poland.

On June 26, 2018, Groban announced via social media that his album Bridges would be released on September 21 and would contain a cover of Céline Dion's song "S'il suffisait d'aimer" along with new tracks. The album debuted at number two in the US and in the top 10 in the UK and Scotland.

=== 2020–2024: Harmony and return to Broadway ===
Groban released his studio album Harmony on November 20, 2020. In December 2022, he portrayed The Beast in the television special Beauty and the Beast: A 30th Celebration, for which he sang Evermore again.

Groban returned to Broadway in the title role in a revival of Stephen Sondheim's musical Sweeney Todd: The Demon Barber of Fleet Street, opposite Annaleigh Ashford as Mrs. Lovett and Jordan Fisher as Anthony Hope, directed by Thomas Kail. The production officially opened on March 26, 2023 (with previews having begun on February 26) at the Lunt-Fontanne Theatre; it received positive reviews and was nominated for eight Tony Awards, including nominations for both Groban and Ashford. He and Ashford departed on 14 January 2024, with Aaron Tveit and Sutton Foster announced to replace them. He has performed with Little Big Town, on Christmas at the Opry, and hosted his own show called Josh Groban and Friends Go Home For the Holidays.

=== 2025–present: Las Vegas, Gems world tour, Cinematic ===
On May 9–17, 2025, Groban performed at Caesars Palace in Las Vegas, on his Gems residency. In February 2026, Groban began the 21-city Gems World Tour, his first world tour in 10 years. On February 21, 2026, Groban performed "Endless Rain" on stage with Japanese musician and composer Yoshiki at Bunkamura Orchard Hall in Tokyo, with Groban singing the lyrics in Japanese. On May 8, 2026, Groban released his album Cinematic, which featured performances of classic songs from throughout film history, including “Unchained Melody,” “Moon River,” and “Can You Feel The Love Tonight,” among others. On July 17, 2026, Groban joined Yoshiki on stage at Walt Disney Concert Hall to perform "Over The Rainbow" and "Forever Love".

On August 28, 2026, Yoshiki and Groban released a live version of "Forever Love" from the Walt Disney Concert Hall performance, featuring Groban singing vocals in both Japanese and English.

== Performances ==
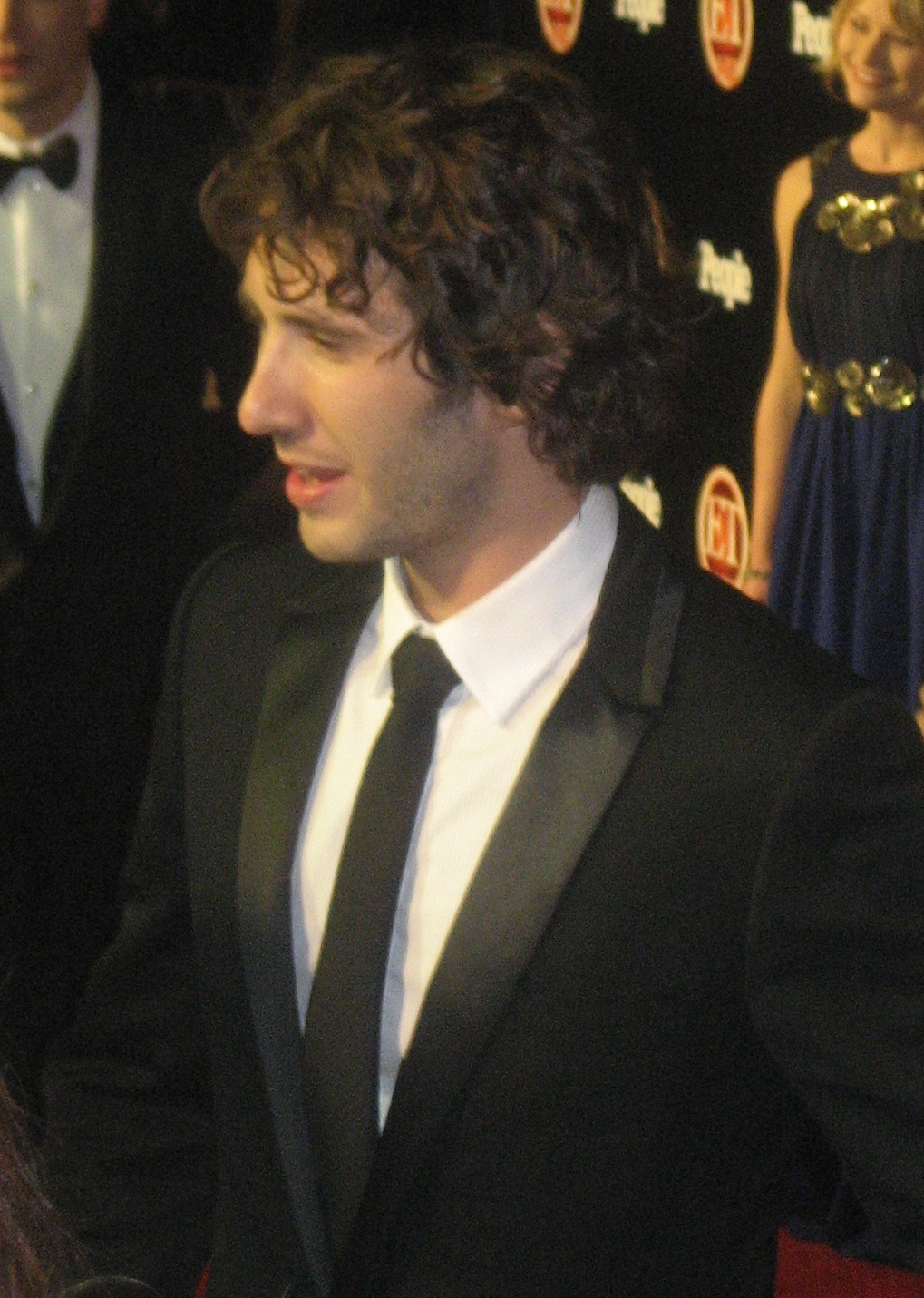
Groban at the ET Post-Emmys Party, Walt Disney Concert Hall, September 21, 2008

In June 2007, Groban recorded a Christmas album in London with the London Symphony Orchestra and the Magdalen College Choir. Titled Noël, it was released on October 9, 2007. The album was very successful in the United States breaking numerous records for a Christmas album and becoming the best-selling album of 2007 in only its tenth week of release, at sales of 3.6 million. He discussed it on the DVD from "The Making of Noël". On July 1, 2007, Groban performed with Sarah Brightman at the Concert for Diana at Wembley Stadium; it was broadcast to over 500 million homes in 140 countries. On February 10, 2008, Groban performed at the 2008 Grammy Awards with Andrea Bocelli in a tribute to Luciano Pavarotti.

On April 14, 2008, Groban joined Idina Menzel for a PBS Soundstage taping. The next day, he held his own taping for the same PBS TV series at Lincoln Center's Rose Hall at Jazz in Manhattan. On May 12 and 13, 2008, at Royal Albert Hall, London, Groban performed as "The Russian" Anatoly Sergievsky with Broadway stars Idina Menzel and Adam Pascal in "Chess in Concert" a live concert version of the musical Chess composed by Benny Andersson and Björn Ulvaeus of ABBA fame. This performance has since been made into a DVD and CD recording.

On September 21, 2008, Groban performed a comical medley of well-known TV theme songs at the 60th Annual Primetime Emmy Awards. In December 2008, he appeared on Never Mind the Buzzcocks. He performed a duet with Only Men Aloud! at the Royal Variety Show at the London Palladium for the Prince of Wales and Duchess of Cornwall. On January 18, 2009, he performed as part of the Presidential Inauguration ceremonies, performing "My Country 'Tis of Thee" in duet with Heather Headley. On January 19, 2009, Groban performed with Herbie Hancock as part of Feeding America's Rally Against Hunger in Washington DC. At the 2010 BCS National Championship Game, he performed the Star Spangled Banner on January 7, 2010, with Red Hot Chili Peppers bassist Flea at the historic Rose Bowl in Pasadena, California.

== Film and television appearances ==
Groban has appeared on The Oprah Winfrey Show six times, as well as on The Ellen DeGeneres Show, Larry King Live, The Rosie O'Donnell Show, Tim and Eric Awesome Show, Great Job!, Comedy Bang! Bang!, The Tonight Show with Jay Leno, 20/20, Today, Macy's Thanksgiving Day Parade, Super Bowl XXXVIII, and Jimmy Kimmel Live!. He has also been a guest co-host on Live with Kelly many times from 2011 to 2016, and was a finalist to permanently replace Regis Philbin. In a 2012 interview, Groban was asked if he would consider hosting a long-term talk show:

Music is so 100 percent for me that the idea of giving that up in any way, shape, or form would be terrifying to me... I've had more fun doing it than many things I've done in the past—it was a great time. So yeah, maybe, you never know.

Groban plays Malcolm Wyatt, one of Reverend Harris's choirboys, on Ally McBeal, episodes "The Wedding" and "Nine One One" (2001). He has made two guest appearances on the series Glee as himself. Groban appeared on BBC Two's hit British music quiz Never Mind the Buzzcocks, and his first appearance was as a guest on Omid Djalili's team. On December 21, 2010, he returned to the show, this time as guest host/quiz master and ending the show duetting with Michael Ball in a version of "I Dreamed a Dream" from Les Misérables.

Groban appears in two episodes of The Office as Andy Bernard's brother ("Garden Party" and "The Boat"). On May 24, 2011, Groban appeared as a mystery guest star on the season 12 finale of Dancing with the Stars to surprise Petra Němcová by singing "You Raise Me Up" to her dance. When she saw that it was he who was actually singing and not one of the usual performers, she momentarily was too stunned to continue dancing.

In the comedy Crazy, Stupid, Love, a film starring Steve Carell and Ryan Gosling, released on July 29, 2011, Groban played a character named Richard, a caddish and nerdy attorney and the previous love interest of Hannah, who's played by Emma Stone. In 2012, he appeared in episode 5 of series 12 of the revived British comedy panel show Room 101. In October the same year, his cover of "You Raise Me Up" was used in the Halloween-based teen comedy film, Fun Size, in which Peng turns on the car stereo in Roosevelt's car and while he and Roosevelt are fighting over it, the knob breaks and the stereo blares the song at full volume, thus making Roosevelt, Wren, Peng and April uncool as they roll onto a night-cruising street. In February 2013, Groban appeared in CSI: NY's "Blood Actually" (season 9, episode 16), performing his new song "Happy In My Heartache", and guest anchored on Canada AM.

Also in 2013, he played one of the lead characters named Sam in the independent comedy film Coffee Town, produced by CollegeHumor and co-starring with longtime friend and actor Glenn Howerton. Groban appeared on the cable television comedy series It's Always Sunny in Philadelphia in episode "The Gang Saves the Day", the 100th of the series, also co-starring Howerton. He shows up in the character Dee's fantasy sequence. On November 7, 2013, he made the first of several appearances in the CBS comedy The Crazy Ones alongside Robin Williams and Sarah Michelle Gellar.

Groban appeared in the 2014 film Muppets Most Wanted as an unnamed prisoner in a maximum security prison in Siberia. Groban's character is first only heard, as he is in a large metal box with a small slot at around eye level. The actor is revealed in the musical number "Together Again" later at the end of the film. He appeared in cameo roles in the seventh season of Parks and Recreation (2015) and in Crazy Ex-Girlfriend (as himself); in the latter, he sang the original song "The End of the Movie".

In September 2018 Netflix premiered an original murder-mystery, The Good Cop, starring Groban. In the series, created by Monk creator-writer Andy Breckman, Groban portrays NYPD homicide detective Tony Caruso Jr., opposite Tony Danza, who plays his father, Tony Sr., a disgraced former detective. The first season of ten episodes launched on September 21, 2018. In early 2022, Groban made a guest appearance on the Jimmy Fallon hosted NBC game-show, That's My Jam. Groban partnered with fellow artist, Alessia Cara. The duo lost to the team of Joseph Gordon-Levitt and Chance the Rapper. Groban played the role of Beast in the 2022 musical television special Beauty and the Beast: A 30th Celebration.

== Voice ==
Some music critics refer to Groban as a tenor and others as a baritone. Groban himself has provided varying claims to his own vocal type. In a 2002 New York Times article, he described himself as a "tenor in training". He mentioned during his appearance on Late Show with David Letterman in December 2013 that he is a high lyric baritone. On Twitter in March 2012, he mentioned that he is a baritone "with some high notes up my sleeve". He is also sometimes referred to as a baritenor. The usage of voice classification in non-classical music is controversial, because of the differing styles and techniques used.

== Philanthropy ==
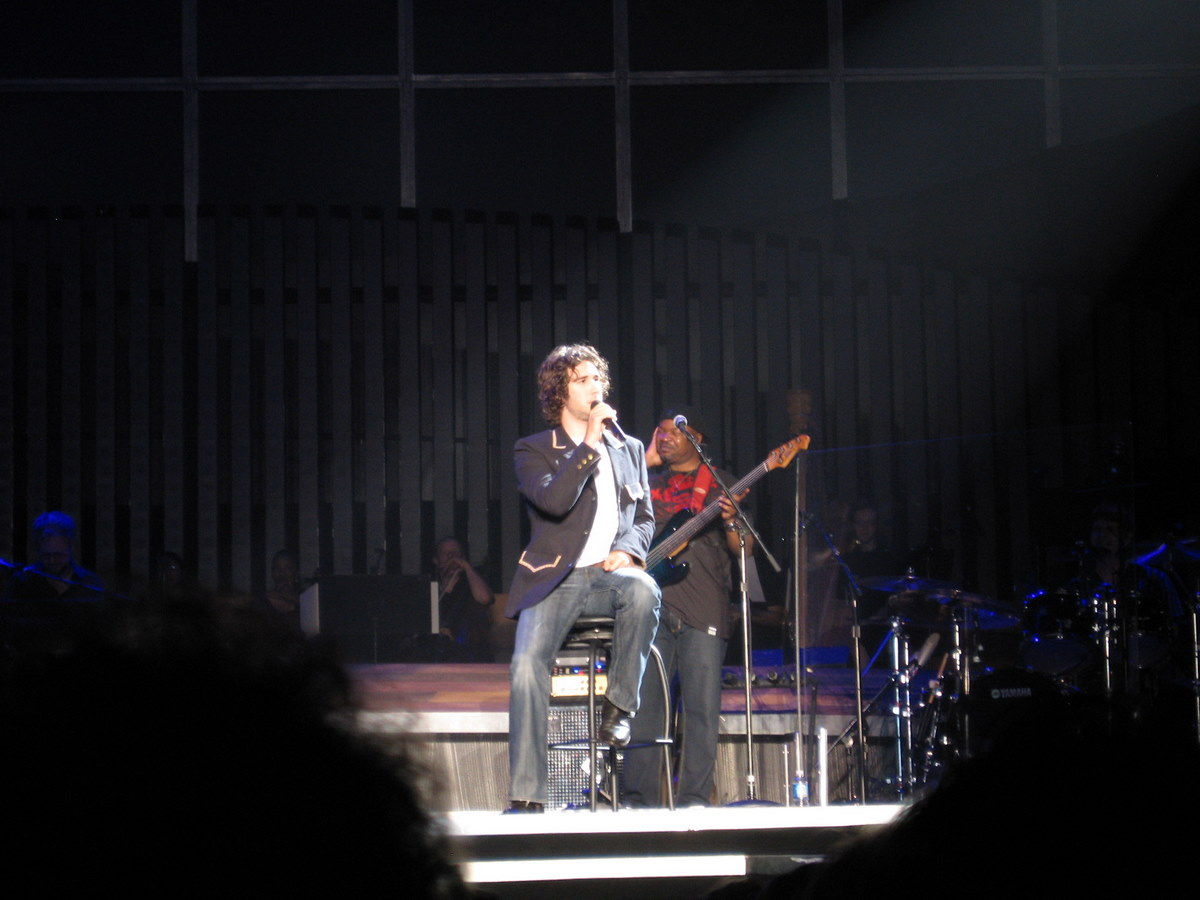
Josh Groban in concert at Atlantic City's Boardwalk Hall in July 2007

Under the guidance of his mentor David Foster, Groban performed for VH1 Save the Music Foundation (2005), Tsunami Aid: A Concert of Hope (2005), Fifth Annual Adopt-A-Minefield concert (2005), 2nd Annual Grammy Jam (2005), Live 8 (2005), The Heart Foundation Gala (2005), David Foster and Friends Charity Gala (2006), and other charity events. He sang a solo on the recording of We Are The World 25 for Haiti (2010). Inspired by a visit with Nelson Mandela during a 2004 trip to South Africa, he established the Josh Groban Foundation to help children in need through education, healthcare and the arts. Mandela appointed Groban as an Official Ambassador for Mandela's Project 46664, a campaign to help raise Global awareness of HIV/AIDS in Africa. On April 25, 2007, Groban performed with the African Children's Choir on American Idol's "Idol Gives Back" episode. Also on September 2, 2007, Groban donated $150,000 to Charlotte-Mecklenburg Schools to fund music education.

On February 28, 2008, he appeared in One Night Live at the Air Canada Centre in Toronto with Bryan Adams, Sarah McLachlan, Jann Arden, and RyanDan in aid of the Sunnybrook Hospital Women and Babies Program. In honor of his 27th birthday, his fans set out to raise $27,000 in a project called "Raise 27". They raised $44,227 for the Josh Groban Foundation, to benefit the Noah's Ark children's orphanage called Siyawela in South Africa. Groban has referred to the donation as "the best birthday present ever". He performed at The Angel Ball on October 21, 2010, to benefit the Gabrielles Angel Foundation for cancer research. In April 2013, and the previous year, Groban took part in Global Poverty Project's "Live Below the Line" campaign, which consists in living on $1.50 a day to raise awareness of extreme poverty around the world. He also wrote a song inspired by the campaign.

On October 30, 2013, Groban met with Little Kids Rock students in Newark, New Jersey before his concert at the Prudential Center. His Find Your Light Foundation also made a donation to Little Kids Rock to support their mission of keeping music education in our public schools. An active arts education philanthropist and advocate, he is a member of Americans for the Arts Artists Committee. On January 17, 2021, three days before the inauguration of Joe Biden Groban performed at an "indoguration" for Joe Biden's German Shepherd Major organized by the Delaware Humane Association. More than 7,400 people attended via Zoom and the event also raised $200,000 in donations for the association.

== Impact ==
Some of Groban's musical influences have been Radiohead, Steve Perry, Paul Simon, Sting, Peter Gabriel, Freddie Mercury, and Björk. He cites as vocal influences "anyone who told a story with their songs" including Mandy Patinkin, Klaus Nomi, George Hearn, and Luciano Pavarotti.

Groban has sold more than 20 million albums in less than ten years. In 2002, he was listed as "100 Sexiest Newcomer" and in 2008, he was listed as one of People's "100 Most Beautiful People".

== Personal life ==
Groban dated actresses January Jones from 2003 to 2006 and Kat Dennings from 2014 to 2016. Groban was in a relationship with Schuyler Helford from 2019 to 2021.

Groban has been in a relationship with Natalie McQueen since 2022. Since April 2026, Groban and McQueen have been engaged.

== Discography ==
Studio albums

- Josh Groban (2001)
- Closer (2003)
- Awake (2006)
- Noël (2007)
- Illuminations (2010)
- All That Echoes (2013)
- Stages (2015)
- Bridges (2018)
- Harmony (2020)
- Cinematic (2026)

== Concert tours ==
Headlining

- Closer Tour (2004–05)
- Awake Tour (2007)
- Straight to You Tour (2011)
- All That Echoes World Tour (2013)
- Josh Groban on Stage (2015–16)
- Bridges Tour (2018)
- Harmony Tour (2021)
- Gems World Tour (2026)

Co-headlining

- North American Tour (with Jennifer Hudson) (2026)

Symphonic

- All That Echoes Symphony Tour (2013)
- Summer Symphony Tour (2014)
- Stage Screen and Symphony (2026)

Residencies

- Josh's Great Big Radio City Show (2021–22)
- Gems (2025-26)

Promotional

- Before We Begin (2010)

== Acting credits ==
=== Film ===
Year	Title	Role	Notes
2011	Crazy, Stupid, Love.	Richard	
2013	Coffee Town	Sam	
2014	Muppets Most Wanted	Maximum Security Prisoner	
2016	The Hollars	Rev. Dan	
2022	Weird: The Al Yankovic Story	Waiter	

=== Television ===
Year	Title	Role	Notes
2001	Ally McBeal	Malcolm Wyatt	2 episodes
2005	American Dad!	Whiny Parishioner (voice)	Episode: "Deacon Stan, Jesus Man"
2008, 2010	Never Mind the Buzzcocks	Himself	2 episodes
2009	Tim and Eric, Awesome Show, Great Job!	Himself	Episode: "Hair"
2009–2010	Glee	Himself	2 episodes
2011	Robot Chicken	Bill (voice)	Episode: "Catch Me If You Kangaroo Jack"
2011–2012	The Office	Walter Bernard Jr.	Episodes: "Garden Party", "The Boat"
2011–2014	Live with Regis and Kelly	Co-host	15 episodes
2013	CSI: NY	Himself	Episode: "Blood Actually"
2013–2014	The Crazy Ones	Danny Chase	2 episodes
2013	It's Always Sunny In Philadelphia	Himself	Episode: "The Gang Saves The Day"
2014	Happyland	Dirty Dave	3 episodes
2014	Rising Star	Himself (host)	10 episodes
2014	American Dad!	Himself (voice)	Episode: "News Glance with Genevieve Vavance"
2014–2015	Comedy Bang! Bang!	Himself	2 episodes
2015	American Dad!	Daniel (voice)	Episode: "Manhattan Magical Murder Mystery Tour"
2015	Repeat After Me	Himself	Episode #1.7
2015	The Muppets	Himself	Episode: "Hostile Makeover"
2015	Parks and Recreation	Himself	Episode: "Save JJ's"
2016	Life in Pieces	Ian	Episode: "Tattoo Valentine Guitar Pregnant"
2017	Crazy Ex-Girlfriend	Himself	Episode: "Josh's Ex-Girlfriend is Crazy!"
2018	72nd Tony Awards	Himself (host)	Television special
2018	The Good Cop	Tony Caruso Jr.	Main role
2018	Niko and the Sword of Light	Olivier Falstaff Scenechuer (voice)	Episode: "The Thorn of Contention"
2018	Mickey's 90th Spectacular	Himself (musical guest)	Television special
2019	The Simpsons	Professor Frink's singing voice	Episode: "I'm Just a Girl Who Can't Say D'oh"
2020	Unbreakable Kimmy Schmidt	Himself	Special: "Kimmy vs the Reverend"
2020	The Not-Too-Late Show with Elmo	Himself (musical guest)	Episode: "Andy Cohen/Josh Groban"
2022	That's My Jam	Himself/Guest	Episode: "Joseph Gordon-Levitt & Chance the Rapper vs. Alessia Cara & Josh Groban"
2022	Beat Bobby Flay	Himself/Guest host	Episode: "You Braise Me Up"
2022	Beauty and the Beast: A 30th Celebration	The Beast	Television special

=== Theatre ===
Year	Title	Role	Location	Notes
2003	Chess	Anatoly Sergievsky	New Amsterdam Theatre	Actors Fund Benefit Concert
2008	Chess	Anatoly Sergievsky	Royal Albert Hall	London Concert
2016–2017	Natasha, Pierre & The Great Comet of 1812	Pierre Bezukhov	Imperial Theatre	Original Broadway cast
2019	Freestyle Love Supreme	Special Spontaneous Guest Performer	Booth Theatre	Broadway
2021	Freestyle Love Supreme	Special Spontaneous Guest Performer	Booth Theatre	Broadway
2022	Beauty and the Beast	The Beast	Walt Disney Studios	Television special of live production
2023	Gutenberg! The Musical!	The Producer	James Earl Jones Theatre	Broadway (One night cameo)
2023–2024	Sweeney Todd: The Demon Barber of Fleet Street	Sweeney Todd	Lunt-Fontanne Theatre	Original Broadway revival cast

== Accolades ==
=== Music ===
Year	Award	Category	Work	Result
2004	People's Choice Awards	Favorite Male Singer		Nominated
2003	Billboard Music Award	No. 1 classical crossover artist of the year		Won
2003	Billboard Music Award	No. 1 classical crossover album of the year	Closer	Won
2003	Billboard Music Award	Internet Artist of the Year		Nominated
2004	World Soundtrack Academy	Best Original Song Written for Film	Troy – "Remember Me"	Nominated
2004	American Music Award	Favorite Pop/Rock Male Artist		Nominated
2005	Grammy Award	Best Male Pop Vocal Performance	"You Raise Me Up"	Nominated
2005	Pollstar Concert Industry Awards	Best New Touring Artist		Won
2005	World Soundtrack Academy	Best Original Song Written for Film	The Polar Express – "Believe"	Nominated
2005	Critics' Choice Movie Awards	Best Song	The Polar Express – "Believe"	Nominated
2005	World Music Awards	World's Best Selling Pop Male Artist		Nominated
2008	Juno Award	International Album of the Year	Noël	Nominated
2009	Grammy Award	Best Traditional Pop Vocal Album	Noël	Nominated
2016	Grammy Award	Best Traditional Pop Vocal Album	Stages	Nominated
2017	Grammy Award	Best Traditional Pop Vocal Album	Stages Live	Nominated
2024	Grammy Award	Best Musical Theater Album	Sweeney Todd: The Demon Barber of Fleet Street	Nominated

=== Television ===
Year	Award	Category	Work	Result
2019	Primetime Emmy Award	Outstanding Original Music and Lyrics	72nd Tony Awards – "This One's For You"	Nominated
2019	Primetime Emmy Award	Outstanding Variety Special (Live)	72nd Tony Awards	Nominated
2024	Astra TV Awards	Best Actor in a Broadcast Network or Cable Limited Series or TV Movie	Beauty and the Beast: A 30th Celebration	Nominated

=== Theatre ===
Year	Award	Category	Work	Result
2017	Tony Award	Best Performance by a Leading Actor in a Musical	Natasha, Pierre & The Great Comet of 1812	Nominated
2017	Drama League Award	Distinguished Performance	Natasha, Pierre & The Great Comet of 1812	Nominated
2017	Theatre World Award		Natasha, Pierre & The Great Comet of 1812	Honoree
2023	Tony Award	Best Actor in a Musical	Sweeney Todd: The Demon Barber of Fleet Street	Nominated
2023	Drama League Award	Distinguished Performance	Sweeney Todd: The Demon Barber of Fleet Street	Nominated
