= Summer Symphony Tour =

2014 concert tour by Josh Groban

- Tour by Josh Groban
- Associated album: All That Echoes
- Start date: August 16, 2014
- End date: August 30, 2014
- Legs: 1
- No. of shows: 9 in North America

Josh Groban concert chronology
- All That Echoes World Tour (2013); Summer Symphony Tour (2014); Stages Live (2015–16)

The Summer Symphony Tour is the second symphonic tour (and sixth overall concert tour) by American recording artist, Josh Groban. The tour supports Groban's sixth studio album, All That Echoes (2013). The tour primarily visited the United States with nine shows along the East Coast.

== Orchestras ==
- Cary: North Carolina Symphony
- Vienna: National Symphony Orchestra
- Hopewell: CMAC Symphony orchestra
- Bethel: Syracuse Symphony Orchestra
- Scranton: Northeastern Pennsylvania Philharmonic
- Philadelphia: Chamber Orchestra of Philadelphia
- Uncasville: Donn Trenner Orchestra
- Lenox: Boston Pops Orchestra

== Setlist ==
The following setlist was obtained from the August 29, 2014 concert; held at the Mohegan Sun Arena in Uncasville, Connecticut. It does not represent all shows for the duration of the tour.

1. "Changing Colours"
2. "February Song"
3. "Alejate"
4. "Vincent"
5. "Alla Luce del Sole"
6. "Falling Slowly"
7. "Play Me"
8. "Caruso"
9. "Instrumental Sequence" (contains elements of "Dream On")
10. "Você Existe Em Mim"
11. "Happy in My Heartache"
12. "Per Te"
13. "Children Will Listen" / "Not While I'm Around"
14. "To Where You Are"
15. "I Believe (When I Fall in Love It Will Be Forever)"
16. "You Raise Me Up"

Encore

17. "Smile"

== Tour dates ==
Date	City	Country	Venue
North America
August 16, 2014	Cary	United States	Koka Booth Amphitheatre
August 19, 2014	Vienna	United States	Filene Center
August 20, 2014	Vienna	United States	Filene Center
August 22, 2014	Hopewell	United States	CMAC Performing Arts Center
August 23, 2014	Bethel	United States	Bethel Woods Center for the Arts
August 26, 2014	Scranton	United States	Toyota Pavilion
August 27, 2014	Philadelphia	United States	Mann Center for the Performing Arts
August 29, 2014	Uncasville	United States	Mohegan Sun Arena
August 30, 2014	Lenox	United States	Koussevitzky Music Shed

=== Box office score data ===
Venue	City	Tickets sold / available	Gross revenue
Mann Center for the Performing Arts	Philadelphia	5,740 / 6,421 (89%)	$391,090
Mohegan Sun Arena	Uncasville	6,223 / 6,355 (98%)	$508,690
