= All That Echoes World Tour =

2013 concert tour by Josh Groban

- Tour by Josh Groban
- Promotional poster for the tour
- Associated album: All That Echoes
- Start date: April 13, 2013
- End date: November 13, 2013
- Legs: 4
- No. of shows: 9 in Australasia; 21 in Europe; 33 in North America; 63 in total

Josh Groban concert chronology
- Straight to You Tour (2011); All That Echoes World Tour (2013); Summer Symphony Tour (2014)

The All That Echoes World Tour is the fifth concert tour by American recording artist, Josh Groban. Promoting his sixth studio album, All That Echoes, the tour performed over 60 shows in Australasia, Europe and North America.

== Background ==
The tour was announced on February 2, 2013, via Groban's official website. Initially showing four shows in Australia, the announcement tied into Groban's first concert film. Titled, Josh Groban Live: All That Echoes, the film debuted in select theaters (in the U.S.) on February 4, 2013. The show was filmed at the Allen Room, located within the Lincoln Center for the Performing Arts, in New York City. The film was later shown as a PBS special hosted by Audra McDonald, airing April 12, 2013. The film's distributor, Fathom Events, re-released the film on July 16, 2013, as a part of its "Artist's Cut" series.

For the first North American leg, Groban performed alongside several symphony orchestras. Deemed the All That Echoes Symphony Tour, the singer visited numerous amphitheaters during the summer of 2013. In May 2013, Groban announced his second North American leg. Here, the singer would play arenas in the U.S. and Canada in the round. The In the Round Tour was the first for the performer in his touring career. He explained wanting to take the intimacy of a theater and translate it into an arena setting. He went on to say:

"It has been a vision of mine to do a tour in the round for a while now, it was just a matter of when was the right time. I have always had moments during the show where I walked through the crowd and interacted with the fans. I felt that now was the time to bring it all together. I can't wait to bring music from throughout my career, great fun and new experiences to my fans".

== Orchestras ==
For the shows from July to August, known as the "All That Echoes Symphony Tour", Groban performed each show with a local symphony orchestra.

- July 2, 3, 4–Los Angeles–Los Angeles Philharmonic
- July 7–Morrison–Colorado Symphony Orchestra
- July 24–Rohnert Park–Santa Rosa Symphony
- August 10–Highland Park–Ravinia Festival Orchestra
- August 12–Interlochen–Traverse Symphony Orchestra
- August 13–Kettering–Dayton Philharmonic Orchestra
- August 16–Vienna–National Symphony Orchestra
- August 18–Atlanta–Atlanta Symphony Orchestra
- August 22–Canandaigua–Rochester Philharmonic Orchestra

== Opening acts ==
- Judith Hill (North America—Leg 3)
- Dina Garipova (Moscow)

== Setlist ==
April 23, 2013—Melbourne, Australia—Palais Theatre
1. "Brave"
2. "You Are Loved (Don't Give Up)"
3. "February Song"
4. "Aléjate"
5. "Happy in My Heartache"
6. "Alla Luce del Sole"
7. "The Moon Is a Harsh Mistress"
8. "Sincera"
9. "Hollow Talk"
10. "Untitled I" (Instrumental Interlude)
11. "Você Existe Em Mim"
12. "Falling Slowly"
13. "Vincent"
14. "To Where You Are"
15. "Machine"
16. "I Believe (When I Fall in Love It Will Be Forever)"

Encore

17. "Awake"
18. "You Raise Me Up"
July 2, 2013—Los Angeles, California—Hollywood Bowl
1. "Brave"
2. "False Alarms"
3. "February Song"
4. "Un alma más"
5. "Vincent"
6. "Alla Luce del Sole"
7. "The Moon Is a Harsh Mistress"
8. "Sincera"
9. "Hollow Talk"
10. "Dream On" (performed by Christian Hebel)
11. "Untitled I" (Instrumental Interlude)
12. "Você Existe Em Mim"
13. "Broken Vow"
14. "I Believe (When I Fall in Love It Will Be Forever)"
15. "You Raise Me Up"
October 16, 2013—Kansas City, Missouri—Sprint Center
1. "Untitled I" (Instrumental Introduction, contained elements of "All'improvviso Amore")
2. "Brave"
3. "False Alarms"
4. "February Song"
5. "Un alma más"
6. "Vincent"
7. "Alla Luce del Sole"
8. "The Moon Is a Harsh Mistress"
9. "Sincera"
10. "Remember When It Rained" (performed with Judith Hill)
11. "Dream On" (performed by Christian Hebel)
12. "Untitled II" (Instrumental Interlude)
13. "Você Existe Em Mim"
14. "To Where You Are"
15. "She Moved Through the Fair"
16. "The Prayer" (performed with Judith Hill)
17. "I Believe (When I Fall in Love It Will Be Forever)" (performed with Kantorei Kansas City)

Encore

18. "You Raise Me Up"

== Tour dates ==
Date	City	Country	Venue
Australasia
April 13, 2013	Auckland	New Zealand	Vector Arena
April 16, 2013	Perth	Australia	Riverside Theatre
April 18, 2013	Adelaide	Australia	Festival Theatre
April 20, 2013	Melbourne	Australia	Palais Theatre
April 21, 2013	Melbourne	Australia	Palais Theatre
April 23, 2013	Sydney	Australia	Sydney Opera House
April 24, 2013	Sydney	Australia	Sydney Opera House
April 26, 2013	Brisbane	Australia	QPAC Concert Hall
April 27, 2013	Brisbane	Australia	QPAC Concert Hall
Europe
May 19, 2013	Moscow	Russia	Crocus City Hall
May 21, 2013	Helsinki	Finland	Hartwall Areena
May 23, 2013	Turku	Finland	HK Arena
May 25, 2013	Stockholm	Sweden	Ericsson Globe
May 27, 2013	Oslo	Norway	Oslo Spektrum
May 28, 2013	Copenhagen	Denmark	Falkoner Teatret
May 30, 2013	Vienna	Austria	Wiener Stadthalle
May 31, 2013	Zürich	Switzerland	Hallenstadion
June 2, 2013	Berlin	Germany	Tempodrom
June 3, 2013	Hamburg	Germany	CCH Hall 1
June 5, 2013	Düsseldorf	Germany	Mitsubishi Electric Halle
June 7, 2013	Frankfurt	Germany	Alte Oper
June 9, 2013	Amsterdam	Netherlands	Ziggo Dome
June 10, 2013	Paris	France	Le Grand Rex
June 12, 2013	Brussels	Belgium	Cirque Royal
June 14, 2013	London	England	The O_{2} Arena
June 16, 2013	Manchester	England	O_{2} Apollo Manchester
June 17, 2013	Birmingham	England	Symphony Hall
June 19, 2013	Nottingham	England	Nottingham Royal Concert Hall
June 21, 2013	Glasgow	Scotland	Glasgow Royal Concert Hall
June 23, 2013	Dublin	Ireland	The O_{2}
North America
July 2, 2013	Los Angeles	United States	Hollywood Bowl
July 3, 2013	Los Angeles	United States	Hollywood Bowl
July 4, 2013	Los Angeles	United States	Hollywood Bowl
July 7, 2013	Morrison	United States	Red Rocks Amphitheatre
July 24, 2013	Rohnert Park	United States	Weill Hall and Lawn
August 10, 2013	Highland Park	United States	Ravinia Pavilion
August 12, 2013	Interlochen	United States	Kresge Auditorium
August 13, 2013	Kettering	United States	Fraze Pavilion
August 16, 2013	Vienna	United States	Filene Center
August 18, 2013	Atlanta	United States	Chastain Park Amphitheater
October 2, 2013	Boise	United States	Taco Bell Arena
October 4, 2013	Seattle	United States	KeyArena
October 6, 2013	Sacramento	United States	Sleep Train Arena
October 7, 2013	San Jose	United States	SAP Center at San Jose
October 9, 2013	Phoenix	United States	US Airways Center
October 11, 2013	Salt Lake City	United States	EnergySolutions Arena
October 13, 2013	Las Vegas	United States	MGM Grand Garden Arena
October 16, 2013	Kansas City	United States	Sprint Center
October 19, 2013	Minneapolis	United States	Target Center
October 20, 2013	Chicago	United States	United Center
October 22, 2013	Grand Rapids	United States	Van Andel Arena
October 23, 2013	Auburn Hills	United States	The Palace of Auburn Hills
October 25, 2013	Toronto	Canada	Air Canada Centre
October 26, 2013	Montreal	Canada	Bell Centre
October 28, 2013	Boston	United States	TD Garden
October 30, 2013	Newark	United States	Prudential Center
November 2, 2013	Pittsburgh	United States	Consol Energy Center
November 3, 2013	Philadelphia	United States	Wells Fargo Center
November 6, 2013	Sunrise	United States	BB&T Center
November 8, 2013	Tampa	United States	Tampa Bay Times Forum
November 9, 2013	Orlando	United States	Amway Center
November 12, 2013	Houston	United States	Toyota Center
November 13, 2013	Dallas	United States	American Airlines Center

Cancellations and rescheduled shows

April 16, 2013	Perth, Australia	King's Park & Botanic Garden	Moved to the Riverside Theatre

=== Box office score data ===
Venue	City	Tickets sold / available	Gross revenue
Hallenstadion	Zurich	2,329 / 7,100 (33%)	$183,188
The O_{2} Arena	London	6,641 / 8,448 (79%)	$442,522
Air Canada Centre	Toronto	4,680 / 5,318 (88%)	$369,178

== Critical reception ==
The tour was well received amongst spectators and critics. In New Zealand, Stacey Hunt (Yahoo! New Zealand) gave the show at the Vector Arena five out of five stars. She writes "With the audience seemingly in high spirits it was a great note to end on and the whoops and cheers from the crowd were as good an indicator as any as to how much the show was enjoyed. I was pleasantly surprised by how much I did enjoy it. It was two hours of great music and comic genius and a night I would recommend to both fans and non-fans alike". The good press continued for show in Perth. Lucy Gibson (The West Australian) stated "Indeed, Groban's is a voice that delights and he hit all the right notes with a diverse repertoire that included Don McLean's much- covered ballad, "Vincent', Glen Hansard's exquisite Oscar-winning song 'Falling Slowly', and Jimmy Webb's 'The Moon is a Harsh Mistress'".

For the show in Melbourne at the Palais Theatre, Ching Pei Khoo (The Music) stated Groban showed a great combination of vocals and stage presence. He continues, "He balances the gravity and sombreness of his tenor's voice by constantly peppering genial conviviality and rapid banter in between tracks, whether he is encouraging a fan to toss one cent coins at him on stage or comparing the cuddliness of his buffed guitarist Tariqh Akoni with that of a koala he’d held in Perth". Good reviews continued as the tour reach stateside. Jennifer Durrant (Daily Herald) wrote the concert in Salt Lake City was on her musical bucket list. She continued, "Garnering repeated standing ovations, Groban performed two encore songs—'You Raise Me Up' and the Charlie Chaplin song 'Smile'—songs perfectly descriptive of the mood of the thousands of concertgoers as they left the arena singing and humming their favorite tunes of the night".

John Serba (mLive) called the concert at the Van Andel Arena, "a greeting card come to life". He went on to say, "There's a distinctly polished, accomplished adult-contemporary tone to The Grobester's music that makes it feel processed and safe. Few risks are taken. If it was performed by anyone else, it might be suffocating. Emotionally, he stops short of the watery melodrama of Sarah McLachlan; he's several hair tosses away from Yanni-style cheeze. He follows the tradition of Barry Manilow and Neil Diamond, the bearers of bathos, but he bears the easy charisma of a grounded 21st-century personality not concerned with pop stardom". For the final show in Dallas, Hunter Hauk (The Dallas Morning News) called the show a "victory lap to the finish line". He goes on to say, "While an in-the-round setup might be awkward for performers who hog the spotlight, Groban seemed happy to let his trumpet player, violinist and guitarists share in the crowd's love on the outer catwalk. When the production called for extra arena drama, starry lighting displays and other elegant set embellishments were lowered on command".

== Band ==
- Bass: Andre Manga
- Keyboards: Ruslan Sirota
- Percussion: Pete Korpela
- Guitar: Tariqh Akoni
- Drums: Dave DiCenso
- Violin: Christian Hebel
- Trumpet: Daniel Rosenboom
