= Hidden Away =

Hidden Away may refer to:

- "Hidden Away" (song), 2010 song by Josh Groban
- Hidden Away (2014 film), 2014 Spanish film
- Hidden Away (2020 film), 2020 Italian film
