= Gainbridge Fieldhouse =

Indoor arena in Indianapolis, Indiana, US

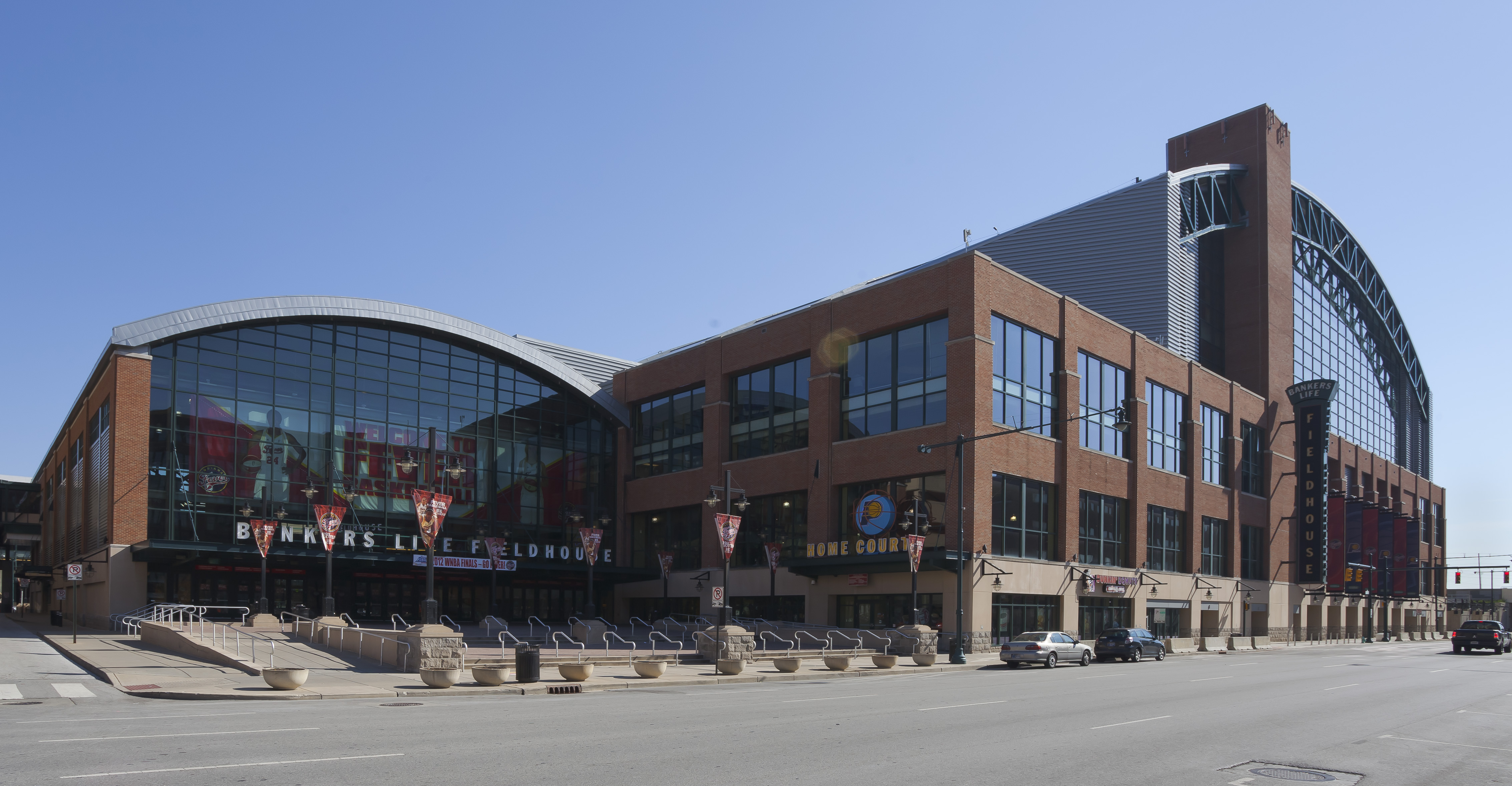
- The arena in 2012

- Location in Indianapolis Location in Indiana Location in the United States
- Former names: Conseco Fieldhouse (1999–2011); Bankers Life Fieldhouse (2011–2021)
- Address: 125 South Pennsylvania Street
- Location: Indianapolis, Indiana, U.S.
- Coordinates: 39°45′50″N 86°9′20″W
- Owner: Capital Improvement Board, City of Indianapolis
- Operator: Capital Improvement Board of Managers of Marion County, Indiana
- Capacity: Basketball: 17,274; Concerts: 18,274; Ice hockey: 11,651

Construction
- Groundbreaking: July 22, 1997
- Opened: November 6, 1999
- Renovated: 2020–2022
- Expanded: 2022
- Years active: 1999–present
- Cost: US$183 million (US$354 million in 2025 dollars)
- Architects: Ellerbe Becket; Blackburn Architects
- Project managers: John Klipsch Consulting, LLC
- Structural engineers: Fink Roberts & Petrie Inc.
- Services engineers: Moore Engineers, P.C.
- General contractor: Hunt/Smoot

Tenants
- Indiana Pacers (NBA) (1999–present); Indiana Fever (WNBA) (2000–present); Indiana Firebirds (AFL) (2001–2004); Indiana Ice (USHL) (2012–2014); Indiana Mad Ants (NBAGL) (2023–2025)

Website
- gainbridgefieldhouse.com

Gainbridge Fieldhouse is a multi-purpose indoor arena in downtown Indianapolis, Indiana, United States. It opened in November 1999 to replace Market Square Arena. The arena is the home of the Indiana Pacers of the National Basketball Association (NBA) and the Indiana Fever of the Women's National Basketball Association (WNBA). It also hosts college basketball games (including the annual Big Ten Conference tournaments), indoor concerts, and family events.

Originally named Conseco Fieldhouse, after the financial firm Conseco, the arena was renamed Bankers Life Fieldhouse, before Gainbridge became the naming rights sponsor in 2021.

== Design ==
Ellerbe Becket designed the arena's distinctive brick and glass facade to evoke Indiana's classic high school and college field houses. Unlike most other North American sports arenas, the facility was designed primarily for basketball. The arena can accommodate an NHL-sized rink, but the ice hockey seating capacity is reduced to 12,500 in an asymmetrical configuration.

== Naming rights ==
The arena was originally named Conseco Fieldhouse, as the naming rights to the venue were sold to Conseco, a financial services organization based in nearby Carmel. In May 2010, the company renamed itself CNO Financial Group, but the fieldhouse retained the Conseco name. In December 2011, CNO Financial Group changed the name of the fieldhouse to Bankers Life Fieldhouse, after one of its subsidiaries, Bankers Life and Casualty. CNO decided not to renew its naming sponsorship after it expired on June 30, 2019. On September 27, 2021, the fieldhouse announced that Indianapolis-based financial platform Gainbridge would be the new naming partner for the fieldhouse in a multi-year partnership.

== Events ==
The first NBA game held at Conseco Fieldhouse was on November 6, 1999, when the Indiana Pacers played their regular-season home opener against the Boston Celtics. Later that same season, the Pacers made it to the 2000 NBA Finals against the Los Angeles Lakers. Games 3, 4, and 5 of that championship series were held at Conseco Fieldhouse, but the Pacers ended up losing that season's title four games to two.

Several games of the 2002 FIBA World Championship were played at Conseco Fieldhouse, including the semifinals and the final.

In 2009, the fieldhouse was the site for the 2009 WNBA Finals. The Indiana Fever took on the Phoenix Mercury for games 3 and 4 of that series but ended up losing the series. Three years later, the Fever hosted the 2012 WNBA Finals for games 3 and 4 and beat the Minnesota Lynx.

Additionally, the Indiana Firebirds of the Arena Football League played at the fieldhouse from 2001 to 2004. The venue also hosted select games for the Indiana Ice of the United States Hockey League.

From 2002 to 2007, the fieldhouse served as the site of the Big Ten Conference men's basketball tournament in even-numbered years, while the tournament was held at the United Center in Chicago in odd-numbered years. In 2008, the tournament was moved to Conseco Fieldhouse exclusively for five years, through 2012. The arena is also a frequent site of the Big Ten women's basketball tournament. 2012 marked the 12th time in 13 years that the tournament had been held at the fieldhouse. On June 5, 2011, the Big Ten Conference announced that beginning in 2013, the location of both of the conference basketball tournaments for the following four years would be alternated between the Chicago area and Indianapolis. Bankers Life Fieldhouse would again be the site for both men's and women's events in 2014 and 2016. The 2011 NCAA Women's Final Four was also held at the fieldhouse on April 3 and April 5 of 2011. For basketball, the venue seats 17,923 (18,345 from 1999 to 2006, 18,165 from 2006 to 2016).

From 2011 to 2021, the fieldhouse hosted the Crossroads Classic, an annual event that included the Butler Bulldogs, Indiana Hoosiers, Notre Dame Fighting Irish, and Purdue Boilermakers men's basketball teams.

The Professional Bull Riders brought its Built Ford Tough Series bull riding tour, now known as the Unleash the Beast Series, to the fieldhouse for the first time in January 2011. It was their second visit to Indianapolis; they first visited Indianapolis during the 2004 season when they held a BFTS event at the RCA Dome.

Gainbridge Fieldhouse is one of many concert venues in the city of Indianapolis. On March 11, 2019, Metallica set a new attendance record at the venue with 18,274 fans at the venue. The previous record was held by Billy Joel (16,594).

In December 2017, during a press conference the Indiana Pacers announced that the arena would host the 2021 NBA All-Star Game. In late 2020, due to the COVID-19 pandemic and other conflicts surrounding the 2021 NCAA Division I men's basketball tournament, which was also being held in Indianapolis the same year, the NBA announced the city would host the 2024 NBA All-Star Game instead of the 2021 game.

The arena hosted games 3, 4, and 6 of the 2025 NBA Finals, but the Pacers ended up losing that season's title four games to three.

=== NCAA tournament ===
Gainbridge Fieldhouse hosted first and second-round games of the 2017, 2022, and 2024 men's NCAA tournaments. The arena also hosted first, second, and regional semifinal (Sweet 16) round games of the 2021 men's tournament.

=== Professional wrestling ===
In 2001, World Championship Wrestling, also known as WCW, hosted their PPV event Sin at the arena.

It also hosted many WWE PPV events such as The Great American Bash, SummerSlam, Survivor Series, and Clash of Champions, Fastlane, and Wrestlepalooza in 2006, 2008, 2012, 2016, 2023, and 2025, respectively.

=== Auto racing ===
In 2015, the fieldhouse hosted the Indy Invitational, with midget car racing and outlaw kart racing held on a dirt track erected on the arena floor.

=== Arena football ===
The fieldhouse was home to the Indiana Firebirds of the Arena Football League from 2001 to 2004 after moving from Albany, New York.

=== High school sports ===
In addition to professional events, the arena also hosts the IHSAA state finals in wrestling as well as both girls and boys basketball. It also occasionally hosts other high school tournaments as well.

=== Concerts ===
List of concerts and events at the arena
Date	Main performer(s)	Tour / Concert name	Opening act(s)
November 10, 1999	Bruce Springsteen and the E Street Band	Reunion Tour	—N/a
December 9, 1999	Kid Rock	Between The Legs Tour	Powerman 5000
December 14, 1999	Billy Joel		
March 10, 2000	Backstreet Boys	Into the Millennium Tour	—N/a
March 11, 2000	Backstreet Boys	Into the Millennium Tour	—N/a
April 15, 2000	Elton John	Medusa Tour	—N/a
June 30, 2000	Dr. Dre, Snoop Dogg, Ice Cube, Eminem	Up in Smoke Tour	
July 5, 2000	Ricky Martin	Livin' la Vida Loca Tour	Jessica Simpson
August 27, 2000	AC/DC	Stiff Upper Lip World Tour	Slash's Snakepit
September 9, 2000	Kiss	Kiss Farewell Tour	Ted Nugent; Skid Row
September 22, 2000	Tim McGraw & Faith Hill	Soul2Soul Tour	—N/a
October 25, 2000	NSYNC	No Strings Attached Tour	Meredith Edwards
October 26, 2000	NSYNC	No Strings Attached Tour	Meredith Edwards
May 10, 2001	U2	Elevation Tour	PJ Harvey
October 18, 2001	Janet Jackson	All For You Tour	112
March 22, 2002	Kid Rock	Cocky Tour	Tenacious D
June 21, 2002	Britney Spears	Dream Within a Dream Tour	—N/a
November 7, 2002	American Idol	American Idols Live! Tour 2002	—N/a
December 17, 2002	Bruce Springsteen and the E Street Band	The Rising Tour	—N/a
March 4, 2003	Elton John & Billy Joel	Face to Face 2003	—N/a
April 17, 2003	Avril Lavigne	Try to Shut Me Up Tour	Simple Plan, Gob
July 12, 2003	American Idol	American Idols Live! Tour 2003	—N/a
August 31, 2003	Justin Timberlake & Christina Aguilera	The Justified & Stripped Tour	The Black Eyed Peas
October 21, 2003	Shania Twain	Up! Tour	James Otto
March 30, 2004	Beyoncé, Alicia Keys, Missy Elliott	Verizon Ladies First Tour	Tamia
April 12, 2004	Prince	Musicology Live 2004ever	—N/a
August 1, 2004	American Idol	American Idols Live! Tour 2004	—N/a
August 19, 2004	Metallica	Madly in Anger with the World Tour	Godsmack
September 12, 2005	Green Day	American Idiot World Tour	Jimmy Eat World
July 12, 2006	Tim McGraw & Faith Hill	Soul2Soul II Tour	—N/a
July 15, 2006	Mary J. Blige	The Breakthrough Experience Tour	Letoya Luckett, Jaheim
March 6, 2007	The Who	Endless Wire Tour	The Tragically Hip
October 14, 2007	Van Halen	2007 North American Tour	Ky-Mani Marley
November 6, 2007	Celtic Woman	A New Journey Tour	—N/a
December 9, 2007	Miley Cyrus	Best of Both Worlds Tour	Jonas Brothers
February 8, 2008	Reba McEntire & Kelly Clarkson	2 Worlds 2 Voices Tour	Melissa Peterman
March 20, 2008	Bruce Springsteen and the E Street Band	Magic Tour	—N/a
July 22, 2008	American Idol	American Idols Live! Tour 2008	—N/a
November 3, 2008	AC/DC	Black Ice World Tour	The Answer
March 22, 2009	Eagles	Long Road Out of Eden Tour	—N/a
May 19, 2009	Elton John & Billy Joel	Face to Face 2009	—N/a
September 5, 2009	American Idol	American Idols Live! Tour 2009	—N/a
November 16, 2009	Miley Cyrus	Wonder World Tour	Metro Station
April 9, 2010	Carrie Underwood	Play On Tour	Lady Antebellum
June 29, 2010	Michael Bublé	Crazy Love Tour	Naturally 7
August 12, 2010	Justin Bieber	My World Tour	—N/a
August 31, 2010	American Idol	American Idols Live! Tour 2010	—N/a
October 12, 2010	Eagles	Long Road Out of Eden Tour	Dixie Chicks
July 12, 2011	Josh Groban	Straight to You Tour	ELEW
July 26, 2011	New Kids on the Block & Backstreet Boys	NKOTBSB Tour	Matthew Morrison
August 18, 2011	Maroon 5 & Train	2011 Summer Tour	Nikki Jean
August 22, 2011	Britney Spears	Femme Fatale Tour	DJ Pauly D, Destinee & Paris
September 14, 2011	Katy Perry	California Dreams Tour	Janelle Monáe, DJ Skeet Skeet
February 22, 2012	Van Halen	A Different Kind of Truth Tour	—N/a
November 24, 2012	Carrie Underwood	Blown Away Tour	Hunter Hayes
June 21, 2013	Mary J. Blige & D'Angelo	The Liberation Tour	Bridget Kelly
July 10, 2013	Justin Bieber	Believe Tour	Hot Chelle Rae, Mike Posner
July 14, 2013	Paul McCartney	Out There	—N/a
August 19, 2013	Bruno Mars	The Moonshine Jungle Tour	Fitz and the Tantrums
September 15, 2013	Michael Bublé	To Be Loved Tour	Naturally 7
October 18, 2013	Eagles	History of the Eagles – Live in Concert	—N/a
November 19, 2013	Selena Gomez	Stars Dance Tour	Emblem3, Christina Grimmie, James David
November 21, 2013	P!nk	The Truth About Love Tour	The Kin
December 9, 2013	Drake	Would You Like a Tour?	Miguel
December 11, 2013	Justin Timberlake	The 20/20 Experience World Tour	DJ Freestyle Steve
March 30, 2014	Demi Lovato	The Neon Lights Tour	Fifth Harmony, Cher Lloyd, Collins Key
April 11, 2014	Cher	Dressed to Kill Tour	Pat Benatar, Neil Giraldo
February 28, 2015	Maroon 5	Maroon V Tour	Magic!, Rozzi Crane
May 31, 2015	New Kids on the Block, TLC, Nelly	The Main Event	—N/a
June 19, 2015	Kevin Hart	What Now? Tour	—N/a
July 13, 2015	Shania Twain	Rock This Country Tour	Gavin DeGraw
August 20, 2015	Mötley Crüe	The Final Tour	Alice Cooper, The Cringe
September 16, 2015	Taylor Swift	The 1989 World Tour	Vance Joy
June 20, 2016	Coldplay	A Head Full of Dreams Tour	Alessia Cara, Foxes
June 25, 2016	Justin Bieber	Purpose World Tour	Post Malone, Moxie Raia
July 20, 2016	Coldplay	A Head Full of Dreams Tour	Alessia Cara, Foxes
July 31, 2016	Twenty One Pilots	Emotional Roadshow World Tour	Mutemath, Chef'Special
August 3, 2016	Demi Lovato & Nick Jonas	Future Now Tour	Mike Posner
August 25, 2016	Kanye West	Saint Pablo Tour	—N/a
October 4, 2016	Carrie Underwood	Storyteller Tour: Stories in the Round	Easton Corbin, The Swon Brothers
March 11, 2017	Ariana Grande	Dangerous Woman Tour	Victoria Monét; Bia
March 22, 2017	Bon Jovi	This House Is Not for Sale Tour	Shiny Penny
March 29, 2017	Stevie Nicks	24 Karat Gold Tour	The Pretenders
April 29, 2017	Tim McGraw & Faith Hill	Soul2Soul: The World Tour	Seth Ennis
May 18, 2017	Red Hot Chili Peppers	The Getaway World Tour	IRONTOM, Jack Irons
June 18, 2017	New Kids on the Block, Boyz II Men, Paula Abdul	Total Package Tour	—N/a
August 13, 2017	Bruno Mars	24K Magic World Tour	Camila Cabello
September 8, 2017	Ed Sheeran	÷ Tour	Joshua Radin
October 5, 2017	Garth Brooks & Trisha Yearwood	The Garth Brooks World Tour	—N/a
October 6, 2017	Garth Brooks & Trisha Yearwood	The Garth Brooks World Tour	—N/a
October 7, 2017 (2 shows)	Garth Brooks & Trisha Yearwood	The Garth Brooks World Tour	—N/a
October 8, 2017	Garth Brooks & Trisha Yearwood	The Garth Brooks World Tour	—N/a
November 5, 2017	Lady Gaga	Joanne World Tour	—N/a
November 26, 2017	Janet Jackson	State of the World Tour	—N/a
December 9, 2017	Katy Perry	Witness: The Tour	Purity Ring
March 17, 2018	P!nk	Beautiful Trauma World Tour	KidCutUp
June 27, 2018	Harry Styles	Harry Styles: Live on Tour	Kacey Musgraves
July 13, 2018	Panic! at the Disco	Pray for the Wicked Tour	ARIZONA, Hayley Kiyoko
September 20, 2018	Maroon 5	Red Pill Blues Tour	Julia Michaels
October 7, 2018	Fall Out Boy	Mania Tour	Machine Gun Kelly, State Champs
February 14, 2019	Cher	Here We Go Again Tour	Nile Rodgers, Chic
February 20, 2019	Travis Scott	Astroworld – Wish You Were Here Tour	Sheck Wes
March 11, 2019	Metallica	WorldWired Tour	Jim Breuer
March 22, 2019	Kelly Clarkson	Meaning of Life Tour	Kelsea Ballerini, Brynn Cartelli
March 25, 2019	Mumford & Sons	Delta Tour	Cat Power
April 2, 2019	Justin Timberlake	The Man of the Woods Tour	—N/a
April 30, 2019	P!nk	Beautiful Trauma World Tour	Julia Michaels, KidCutUp
June 16, 2019	Carrie Underwood	Cry Pretty Tour 360	Maddie & Tae, Runaway June
June 28, 2019	Twenty One Pilots	The Bandito Tour	Bear Hands
June 29, 2019	Ariana Grande	Sweetener World Tour	Normani, Social House
September 6, 2019	JoJo Siwa	D.R.E.A.M. The Tour	—N/a
September 10, 2019	Backstreet Boys	DNA World Tour	—N/a
September 11, 2019 (Note: The concert was initially scheduled to take place on July 30, 2019; however, a security threat resulted in the show being rescheduled.)	Cardi B	2019 Unnamed Arena Tour	Saweetie, Kevin Gates
September 13, 2019	Jonas Brothers	Happiness Begins Tour	Bebe Rexha, Jordan McGraw
October 4, 2019	for KING & COUNTRY	Burn the Ships Tour	—N/a
November 7, 2019	The Chainsmokers	World War Joy Tour	—N/a
December 3, 2019	Celine Dion	Courage World Tour	—N/a
January 18, 2020	Winter Jam Tour Spectacular		—N/a
February 9, 2020	Post Malone	Runaway Tour	Swae Lee, Tyla Yaweh
February 18, 2020	The Lumineers	III: The World Tour	Mt. Joy, J.S. Ondara
February 23, 2020	Martin Lawrence	Lit AF Tour	Rickey Smiley, Tommy Davidson, Jay Pharaoh, DeRay Davis, Michael Blackson, Bruce Bruce
February 28, 2020	Justin Moore & Tracy Lawrence	Late Nights and Longnecks Tour	—N/a
March 1, 2020	Omarion & Bow Wow	The Millennium Tour	Ashanti, Soulja Boy, Ying Yang Twins, Pretty Ricky, Lloyd
October 1, 2021	Dan + Shay	The (Arena) Tour	The Band Camino, Ingrid Andress
January 6, 2022	Kane Brown	Blessed & Free Tour	Chase Rice, Restless Road
February 5, 2022	Eric Church	Gather Again Tour	Joanna Cotten
February 17, 2022	Chris Tomlin & Hillsong United	Tomlin United Tour	Pat Barrett
February 21, 2022	Imagine Dragons	Mercury Tour	Grandson
February 22, 2022	MercyMe	Inhale (Exhale) Tour	Micah Tyler
March 22, 2022	Eagles	Hotel California 2020 Tour	—N/a
April 1, 2022	Elton John	Farewell Yellow Brick Road	—N/a
April 7, 2022	Maxwell	The Night Tour	Anthony Hamilton, Joe
April 19, 2022	Bon Jovi	Bon Jovi 2022 Tour	—N/a
April 21, 2022	Justin Bieber	Justice World Tour	Jaden Smith, Eddie Benjamin, TEO
May 5, 2022	Journey	Freedom Tour	Toto
May 12, 2022	New Kids on the Block	Mixtape Tour	Salt-N-Pepa, Rick Astley, En Vogue
October 2, 2022	Post Malone	Twelve Carat Tour	Zack Bia
October 18, 2022	Lizzo	The Special Tour	Latto
October 30, 2022	Christian Nodal	Forajido Tour	-
November 5, 2022	Reba McEntire	Reba: Live in Concert	Terri Clark
November 7, 2022	Carrie Underwood	Denim & Rhinestones Tour	Jimmie Allen
December 7, 2022	Andrea Bocelli	2022 Andrea Bocelli Concert Tour	-
December 11, 2022	Trans-Siberian Orchestra	2022 Winter Tour	-
December 15, 2022	For King & Country	A Drummer Boy Christmas Tour	-
March 19, 2023	TobyMac	Hits Deep Tour 2023	Crowder; Cochren & Co. Tasha Layton; Jon Reddick; Terrian
August 22, 2023	Jonas Brothers	Five Albums. One Night. The World Tour	Lawrence
September 13, 2023	Dave Chappelle	2023 Fall Tour	—N/a
October 6, 2023	Luis Miguel	Luis Miguel Tour 2023–24	
October 29, 2023	Aerosmith	Peace Out: The Farewell Tour	The Black Crowes
June 23, 2024	Janet Jackson	Together Again	Nelly
August 2, 2024	Blink-182	One More Time Tour	Pierce the Veil
September 7, 2024	Jeff Lynne's ELO	The Over and Out Tour	

== Renovations ==
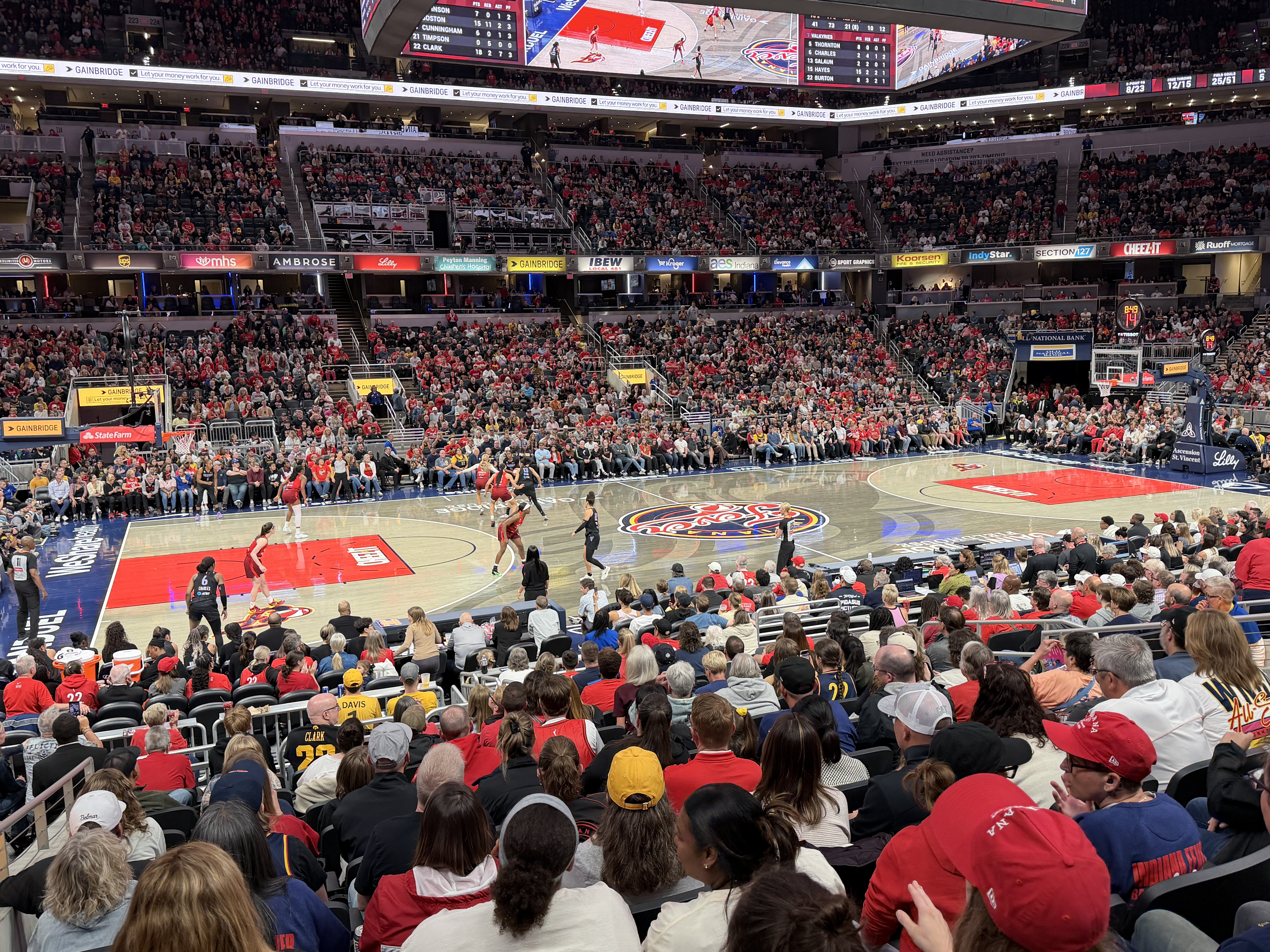
The Indiana Fever play the Golden State Valkyries at Gainbridge Fieldhouse in 2026.

In 2012, a large scoreboard was added to Bankers Life Fieldhouse. The scoreboard features twin 1080p high definition (HD) video screens, each measuring 50 feet (15 m) long – extending nearly foul line to foul line – by 21 feet (6.4 m) high. In addition to the HD screens running the length of the court, the innovative rectangular scoreboard design is capped by a 25 ft × 14 ft (7.6 m × 4.3 m) full 1080p HD video screen facing each baseline. The result of the design is a greatly improved visual experience from nearly every seat in the building. Additionally, a new sound system was installed.

In April 2019, the Marion County Capital Improvement Board approved a major renovation project for the fieldhouse. The $360 million project was completed in late 2022, and included a new outdoor entry plaza, new indoor gathering areas, and various interior enhancements. The Pacers committed to remaining in Indianapolis for at least 25 more years as part of the renovation agreement. Construction occurred in two phases. Almost all of the construction work took place during the Pacers offseasons. The project displaced the Fever for all of the 2020 and 2021 WNBA seasons, as well as part of the 2022 season; for 2022, the Fever played the first section of the schedule at Gainbridge Fieldhouse, but after the NBA season ended, the Fever played games at Indiana Farmers Coliseum.

== Awards and recognitions ==
In 2005 and 2006, Conseco Fieldhouse was ranked the No. 1 venue in the NBA according to the Sports Business Journal/Sports Business Daily Reader Survey. In 2006 The Ultimate Sports Road Trip reaffirmed Conseco Fieldhouse as the best venue in all 4 of the major sports leagues. "The Ultimate Sports Road Trip has recently concluded a re-scoring and re-evaluation of all 122 franchises in the four major sports, based on our personal visits to each of the teams in a journey that began in 1998. Based on our criteria, Conseco Fieldhouse has again withstood scrutiny to be named the "best of the best" in the four major sports. Everything about Conseco Fieldhouse is top notch, a sparkling venue in a sparkling city," said Farrell and Kulyk.

In October 2004, the fieldhouse hosted the 2004 FINA Short Course World Swimming Championships. A 25-meter 300,000-gallon competition pool and 174,000-gallon warm-up pool were temporarily installed. A total of 71,659 tickets were sold for the four-day event. On the evening of Saturday, October 11, 2004, the crowd set a record for the largest attendance at a U.S. Swimming event outside of the Olympics with 11,488 people.

In 2022, sportswriter Bill Simmons called Gainbridge Fieldhouse "incredible", saying "the only arena I've ever been in NBA-wise, where I honestly felt like it felt different was the Indiana one, because they built it for basketball only." He further elaborated by saying "it feels like the fans are on top of the court. The corners come way out toward the baseline. That's still my favorite. All these other ones feel like variations [of the same thing]."

== Seating capacity ==
Years	Capacity
1999–2006	18,345
2006–2016	18,165
2016–2021	17,923
2021–present	17,294

== Gallery ==
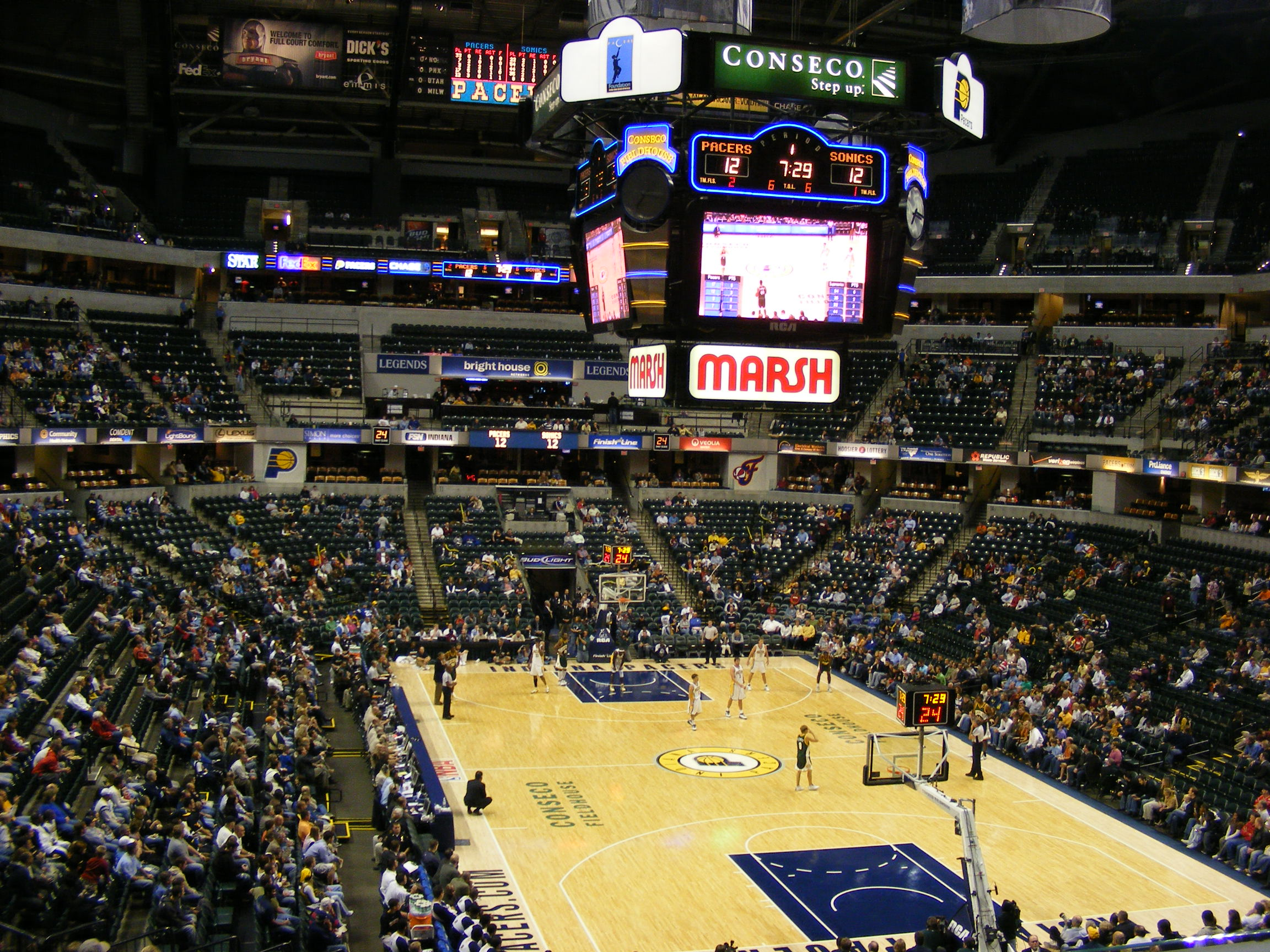
A Pacers' preseason game, showing the original scoreboard, during the Conseco Fieldhouse era

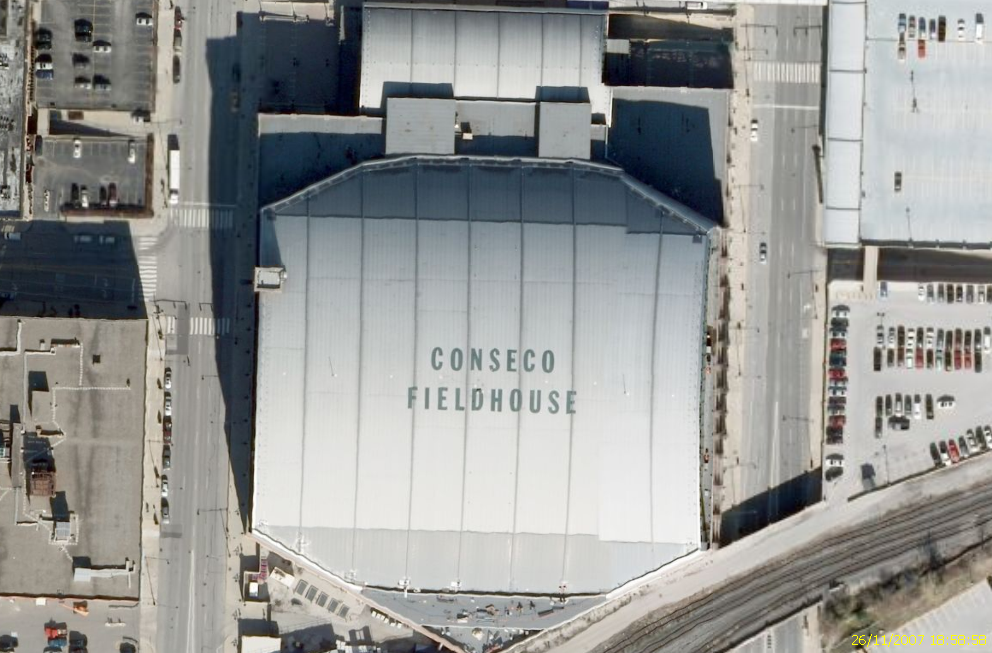
Satellite view of Gainbridge Fieldhouse, showing the former Conseco Fieldhouse name

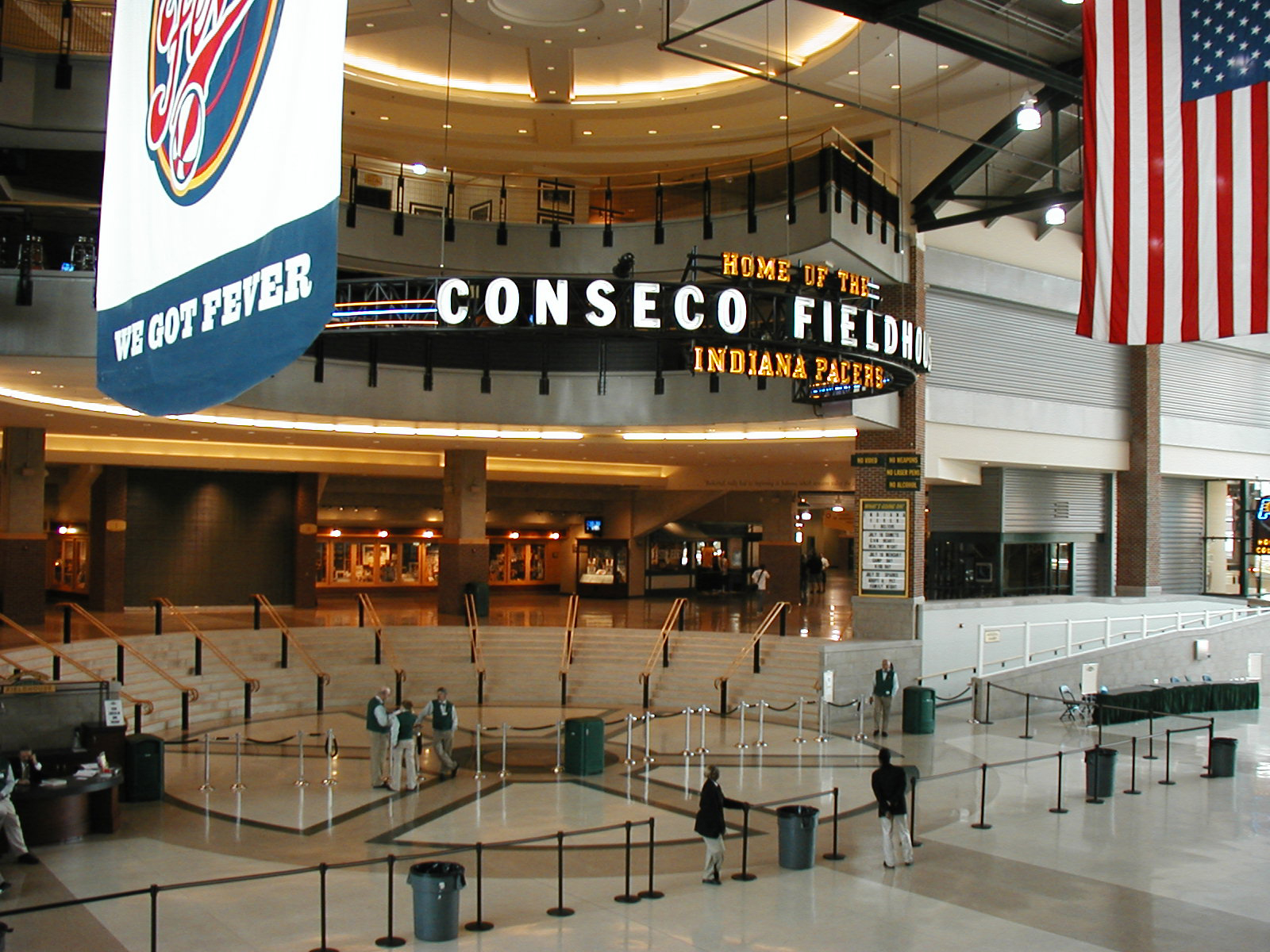
Lobby during the Conseco Fieldhouse era

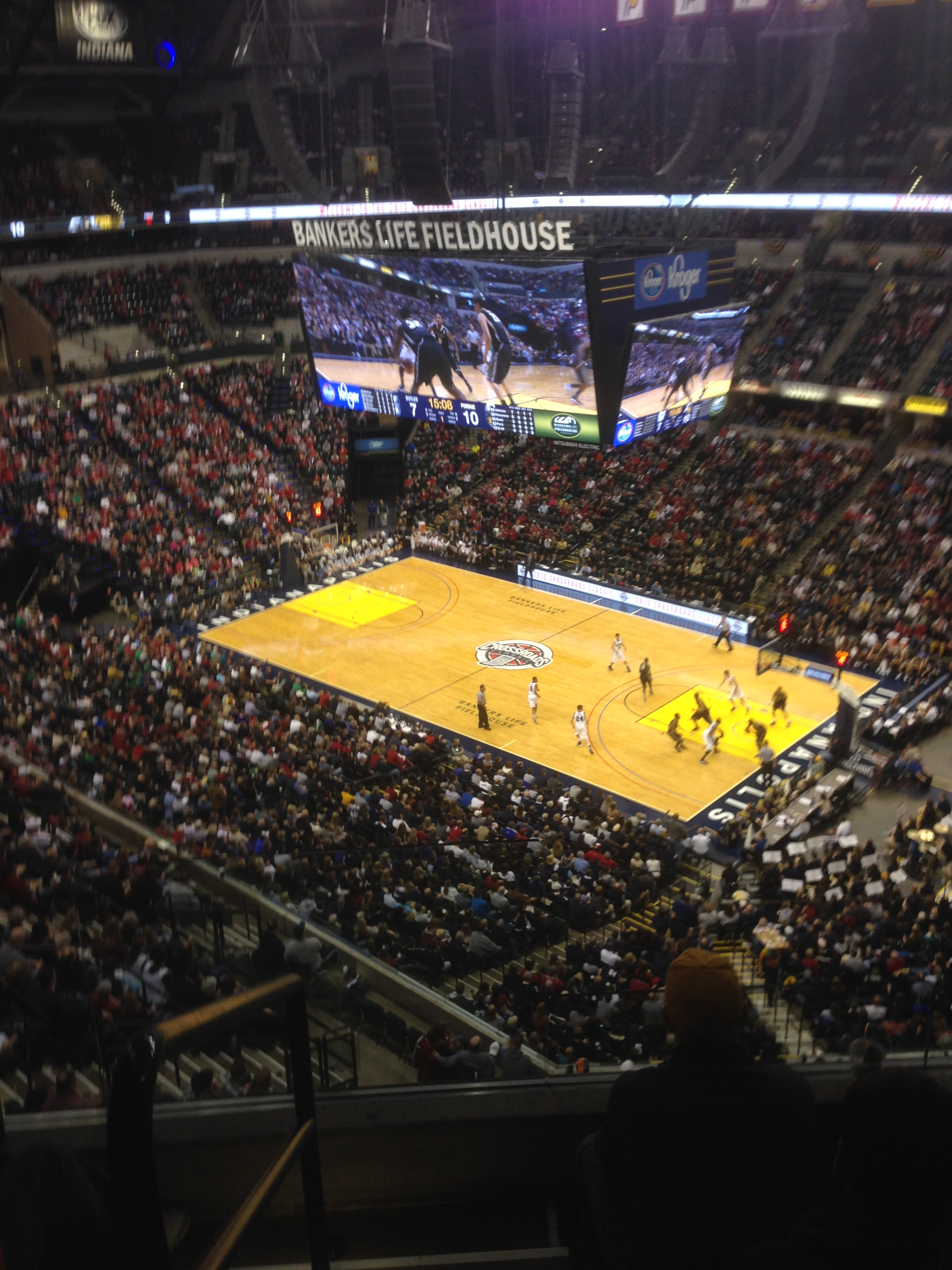
Balcony view of the 2013 Crossroads Classic

== See also ==
- List of basketball arenas
- List of NBA arenas
- List of music venues in the United States
- List of indoor arenas in the United States
- List of American Basketball Association arenas
- List of attractions and events in Indianapolis

== Notes ==
Events and tenants
Preceded by Market Square Arena	Home of the Indiana Pacers; 1999–present	Succeeded by current
Preceded by first arena Hinkle Fieldhouse	Home of the Indiana Fever; 2000–2019; 2022–present	Succeeded by Hinkle Fieldhouse current
Preceded by Olympic Indoor Hall; Athens	FIBA World Cup; Final Venue; 2002	Succeeded by Saitama Super Arena; Saitama
Preceded by Alamodome; San Antonio, Texas	NCAA Division I women's basketball tournament Final Four; 2011	Succeeded by Pepsi Center; Denver, Colorado
Preceded by Vivint Arena	Home of the NBA All-Star Game; 2024	Succeeded by Chase Center
