= Straight to You Tour =

2011 concert tour by Josh Groban

- Tour by Josh Groban
- Promotional poster for the tour
- Associated album: Illuminations
- Start date: May 12, 2011
- End date: December 2, 2011
- Legs: 4
- No. of shows: 59 in North America; 19 in Europe; 5 in Africa; 83 in total

Josh Groban concert chronology
- Before We Begin (2010); Straight to You Tour (2011); All That Echoes World Tour (2013)

The Straight to You Tour is the fourth concert tour by American recording artist Josh Groban. Visiting North America, Europe and Africa, the tour will support Groban's fifth studio album, Illuminations.

== Background ==
The tour was announced by Reprise Records on Valentine's Day 2011. Initially with only three dates, many fans speculated Groban was expanding his intimate tour. Upon his 30th birthday, Groban posted a video on his Tumblr blog stating the tour's expansion in North America with additional dates in England. This is later followed by a posting on his official website with a detailed itinerary of the tour. During an interview with Gayle King, Groban mentions he still worries from time to time about his career. He further states given the current atmosphere in the entertainment industry, Groban is always worried about how the media and fans will approach an experimental sound and production. To prepare for the tour, the singer embarked on a mini tour of the United States playing theaters and concert halls. The nine city tour, entailed "Before We Begin", gave the opportunity for Groban to perform in an intimate setting and connect with the audience in new ways. Groban wants to continue the intimate theme even though he will play arenas.

To introduce the tour, Live Nation stated:

"The "Straight To You" Tour will bring the feel of a theater experience to an arena setting though stage design, lighting, and projection, as well as through spontaneity and interactivity. Groban delighted his fans during last year's 'Before We Begin' shows, in which he solicited feedback from the audience on which songs should be included in the set-list. As a result, for the 'Straight To You' shows, Groban will continue to interact with audiences and perform favorites from his best-selling albums, including his self-titled debut, Closer, and Awake, as well as songs from Illuminations."

== Opening act ==
- ELEW (North America) (select dates)

== Setlist ==
The following songs were performed at the Toyota Center in Houston, Texas. It does not represent all songs performed on tour.

1. "Straight to You" (Instrumental Introduction)
2. "Changing Colors"
3. "February Song"
4. "You Are Loved (Don't Give Up)"
5. "Oceano"
6. "Aléjate"
7. "Bells of New York City"
8. "Higher Window"
9. "Alla Luce del Sole"
10. "War at Home"
11. "Instrumental Sequence"
12. "Você Existe em Mim"
13. "Caruso"
14. "Galileo (Someone Like You)"
15. "Awake"
16. "Weeping"
17. "Machine"
18. "Broken Vow"
19. "Per Te"

Encore

20. "Play Me"
21. "You Raise Me Up"

== Tour dates ==
Date	City	Country	Venue
North America
May 12, 2011	New Orleans	United States	UNO Lakefront Arena
May 14, 2011	Houston	United States	Toyota Center
May 16, 2011	Dallas	United States	American Airlines Center
May 18, 2011	San Antonio	United States	AT&T Center
May 20, 2011	Tulsa	United States	BOK Center
May 21, 2011	Wichita	United States	Intrust Bank Arena
May 24, 2011	Omaha	United States	Qwest Center Arena
May 25, 2011	Kansas City	United States	Sprint Center
May 27, 2011	St. Louis	United States	Scottrade Center
May 28, 2011	Moline	United States	iWireless Center
June 3, 2011	Buffalo	United States	HSBC Arena
June 4, 2011	Cleveland	United States	Quicken Loans Arena
June 8, 2011	Duluth	United States	Arena at Gwinnett Center
June 10, 2011	Charlotte	United States	Time Warner Cable Arena
June 11, 2011	Raleigh	United States	RBC Center
June 14, 2011	Richmond	United States	Richmond Coliseum
June 15, 2011	Hershey	United States	Giant Center
July 8, 2011	Minneapolis	United States	Target Center
July 9, 2011	Green Bay	United States	Resch Center
July 12, 2011	Indianapolis	United States	Conseco Fieldhouse
July 13, 2011	Chicago	United States	United Center
July 15, 2011	Cincinnati	United States	U.S. Bank Arena
July 16, 2011	Auburn Hills	United States	Palace of Auburn Hills
July 18, 2011	Toronto	Canada	Air Canada Centre
July 19, 2011	London	Canada	John Labatt Centre
July 22, 2011	Ottawa	Canada	Scotiabank Place
July 23, 2011	Montreal	Canada	Bell Centre
July 26, 2011	Boston	United States	TD Garden
July 27, 2011	Washington, D.C.	United States	Verizon Center
July 29, 2011	Philadelphia	United States	Wells Fargo Center
July 30, 2011	Uncasville	United States	Mohegan Sun Arena
August 2, 2011	Newark	United States	Prudential Center
August 3, 2011	Pittsburgh	United States	Consol Energy Center
August 5, 2011	Columbus	United States	Value City Arena
August 6, 2011	Grand Rapids	United States	Van Andel Arena
August 9, 2011	Milwaukee	United States	Bradley Center
August 10, 2011	Des Moines	United States	Wells Fargo Arena
August 12, 2011	Denver	United States	Pepsi Center
August 13, 2011	Salt Lake City	United States	EnergySolutions Arena
August 17, 2011	Los Angeles	United States	Staples Center
August 19, 2011	Phoenix	United States	US Airways Center
August 20, 2011	Las Vegas	United States	MGM Grand Garden Arena
August 23, 2011	San Jose	United States	HP Pavilion at San Jose
August 24, 2011	Sacramento	United States	Power Balance Pavilion
August 26, 2011	Portland	United States	Rose Garden
August 27, 2011	Seattle	United States	KeyArena
August 30, 2011	Vancouver	Canada	Rogers Arena
September 1, 2011	Calgary	Canada	Scotiabank Saddledome
September 2, 2011	Edmonton	Canada	Rexall Place
September 4, 2011	Winnipeg	Canada	MTS Centre
Europe
September 14, 2011	Vienna	Austria	Großer Saal
September 16, 2011	Berlin	Germany	Tempodrom
September 18, 2011	Copenhagen	Denmark	Falkoner Teatret
September 20, 2011	Bergen	Norway	Vestlandshallen
September 21, 2011	Oslo	Norway	Oslo Spektrum
September 23, 2011	Stockholm	Sweden	Ericsson Globe
September 25, 2011	Helsinki	Finland	Finlandia Hall
September 26, 2011	Tampere	Finland	Tampere Hall
September 30, 2011	Munich	Germany	Philharmonie im Gasteig
October 2, 2011	Amsterdam	Netherlands	Heineken Music Hall
October 3, 2011	Paris	France	Le Grand Rex
October 6, 2011	Lucerne	Switzerland	KKL Concert Hall
October 9, 2011	Düsseldorf	Germany	Philips Halle
October 11, 2011	London	England	Hammersmith Apollo
October 12, 2011	Birmingham	England	Symphony Hall
October 14, 2011	Manchester	England	Bridgewater Hall
October 16, 2011	Glasgow	Scotland	Glasgow Royal Concert Hall
October 18, 2011	Belfast	Northern Ireland	Waterfront Hall
October 19, 2011	Dublin	Ireland	Grand Canal Theatre
North America
October 26, 2011	Sunrise	United States	BankAtlantic Center
October 28, 2011	Tampa	United States	St. Pete Times Forum
October 29, 2011	Orlando	United States	Amway Center
November 1, 2011	North Charleston	United States	North Charleston Coliseum
November 2, 2011	Norfolk	United States	Norfolk Scope
November 4, 2011	Uniondale	United States	Nassau Veterans Memorial Coliseum
November 8, 2011	Manchester	United States	Verizon Wireless Arena
November 9, 2011	Providence	United States	Dunkin' Donuts Center
November 14, 2011	New York City	United States	Madison Square Garden
Africa
November 26, 2011	North West Province	South Africa	Sun City Superbowl
November 27, 2011	North West Province	South Africa	Sun City Superbowl
November 29, 2011	Cape Town	South Africa	Grand Arena at Grand West Casino
November 30, 2011	Cape Town	South Africa	Grand Arena at Grand West Casino
December 2, 2011	Port Elizabeth	South Africa	Nelson Mandela Bay Stadium

Cancellations and rescheduled shows

June 7, 2011	Greenville, South Carolina	BI-LO Center	Cancelled
August 16, 2011	San Diego, California	Viejas Arena	Cancelled

=== Box office score data ===
Venue	City	Tickets sold / available	Gross revenue
American Airlines Center	Dallas	7,407 / 8,849 (84%)	$538,521
i wireless Center	Moline	5,871 / 6,000 (98%)	$302,706
Air Canada Centre	Toronto	7,658 / 8,000 (96%)	$731,996
John Labatt Centre	London	5,344 / 6,389 (84%)	$409,672
Bell Centre	Montreal	3,646 / 4,550 (80%)	$361,312
Verizon Center	Washington, D.C.	5,734 / 13,559 (42%)	$521,628
Mohegan Sun Arena	Uncasville	4,298 / 4,653 (92%)	$504,120
Staples Center	Los Angeles	9,296 / 10,220 (91%)	$684,452
US Airways Center	Phoenix	5,822 / 9,694 (60%)	$500,901
Rose Garden Arena	Portland	4,426 / 8,818 (49%)	$357,130
Rexall Place	Edmonton	5,963 / 11,080 (54%)	$504,672
Waterfront Hall	Belfast	1,892 / 1,892 (100%)	$126,651
Grand Canal Theatre	Dublin	2,038 / 2,038 (100%)	$126,773
BankAtlantic Center	Sunrise	6,977 / 7,794 (89%)	$404,208
TOTAL		71,946 / 94,718 (76%)	$5,717,612
