= Brave (Josh Groban song) =

Single by Josh Groban

from the album All That Echoes
- Released: 18 December 2012
- Recorded: 2012
- Genre: Classical crossover; pop
- Length: 3:59
- Label: Reprise
- Songwriters: Josh Groban; Tawgs Salter; Chantal Kreviazuk
- Producers: Rob Cavallo; Walter Afanasieff; Lester Mendez

Josh Groban singles chronology
"If I Walk Away" (2010)	"Brave" (2012)	"I Believe (When I Fall in Love It Will Be Forever)" (2013)

Audio sample
- file; help

"Brave" is a 2012 classical crossover–pop song by American singer and songwriter Josh Groban. It was the first single release from his sixth studio album, All That Echoes, signaling a move by Groban to a "more guitar-based, rhythmic" sound.

Groban and longtime songwriting partner Tawgs Salter composed the melody, and the lyrics were written by Chantal Kreviazuk. "Brave" reached No. 13 on Billboard's Adult Contemporary chart.

== Background ==
As Josh Groban was releasing Illuminations in 2010, Rob Cavallo was taking over as chairman of Warner Bros. Records, Groban's label. Carvallo attended one of Groban's concerts during the following tour and had dinner with the singer afterward. Groban said Carvallo—known for his work with rock acts like Goo Goo Dolls and Green Day—had "done his homework" and shared some ideas for the future that coincided with Groban's own. "So we said, 'This seems like on paper maybe not the most obvious thing but let's try it out.'"

Groban and Tawgs Salter had been working on the melody for "Brave" when Groban started singing the words "wake up, wake up" while playing on the piano; "so from the get-go we felt this was a song about rejuvenation." For the remainder of the lyrics, Groban turned to longtime friend Chantal Kreviazuk for their first collaboration, since they had "always been sniffing around for the right thing to do" together.

Groban said he wanted "Brave" to fuse the more traditional vocal style with "an intensity and an urgency", opening an album designed to "bridge the old and the new, the light and the dark of life and love ... all that echoes in our souls."

== Music video ==
For the official music video, Groban was filmed standing on a lighted platform in a warehouse setting.

A "behind the scenes" music video for "Brave" was posted to Groban's YouTube channel in December 2012, including candid shots and production footage. The official music video was released in March 2013; it features orchestra musicians in a recording studio, and Groban standing on a lighted, wooden platform in a warehouse.

== Performances and covers ==
Like the album, Groban used "Brave" to open his concerts during the All That Echoes tour in 2013. Also in 2013, Groban performed the single for two competition programs: in March, he sang alongside professional dancers for Dancing with the Stars; in September, he was invited by tenor group Forte to perform together for the America's Got Talent finale, singing a medley of "Brave" and "To Where You Are". (Note: Groban and Forte's Josh Page met in 2011 when Groban pulled Page from the audience at Madison Square Garden to sing a duet. Video of the performance went viral, and led to the formation of Forte.)

A cappella musician Peter Hollens covered "Brave" in 2013, using only his voice to create the vocals and instrumental accompaniment. A link to Hollens' performance was added to Groban's official website. "Brave" has been recorded by several professional and amateur musicians including Britain's Got Talent alumnus Charlie Green and UK opera singer and actor Toby Hinson.

== Reception ==
=== Release ===
BBC Music called "Brave" a "'You Raise Me Up'-style anthem". Billboard said the song is "the latest example of Groban's continued move toward more guitar-based, rhythmic arrangements—the kind he's been trying out on tour for years to surprise his fans." Reviewing All That Echoes, AllMusic said "Brave" invokes "the yearning uplift of bands like U2 and OneRepublic".

For its review of All That Echoes, Newsday wrote, "[on] the "Coldplayesque first single, 'Brave'" ... [Groban's] classically trained, powerful vocals compete with the extra drama of the orchestral arrangements." The Independent found the song "vaguely uplifting". The Village Voice called it "cinematic" if positive in its message. "Be careful, though: it's like a sprayed-white Christmas tree covered in blue lights and tinsel—works fine in the bank, but you might not want it in your house."

=== Performance ===
In concert in 2013, MLive called the song "the first of many heavily orchestrated numbers with lush instrumentation, designed to be vehicles for his throaty vibrato." The Orlando Sentinel said "Brave" was a "zestful, melodic anthem ". The Toronto Star said the song "might be a metaphor for the singer's charmed connection with loyal fans."

The Morning Call was more critical in its review, writing that Groban seemed to be "trying too hard to be contemporary rather than classical. ... He sang too much of the song in an affected voice".

== Charts ==
=== Weekly charts ===
Chart (2013)	Peak position
Germany (Official German Charts)	99
UK Singles (OCC)	64
US Billboard Adult Contemporary	13

=== Year-end charts ===
Chart (2013)	Position
US Adult Contemporary (Billboard)	33
