= Sam Alves =

Brazilian singer

- Born: Samuel Martins Alves; 3 June 1989 (age 37); Fortaleza, Ceará, Brazil
- Genres: Pop, R&B
- Occupation: Singer
- Instruments: Vocals, piano
- Years active: 2013–present
- Label: Universal Music
- Website: samalvesmusic.com

Samuel Martins Alves (born June 3, 1989) is a Brazilian singer. In December 2013, Alves won the second season of The Voice Brasil and signed with Universal Music Brasil. Alves has also appeared on the U.S. version of The Voice, where he participated in the blind auditions for the fourth season but was not selected by any of the judges.

== Biography ==
As an infant, Sam was abandoned in a shoebox at the door of a house in Fortaleza, Ceará. With him, a note written with some writing errors said that he was born on June 3, 1989, and given porridge at 3:00 on June 5, the same day Luiz and Raquel Alves found him. Soon after Alves' fourth birthday, his family decided to move to the United States, and Alves grew up and was educated in Massachusetts. Luiz was a pastor and newspaper deliveryman, while Raquel cleaned houses for a living.

When Alves was 14, his mother, Raquel, started training him to sing in church, and in 2003, the two returned to Brazil for a missionary job. Alves studied at the School of Music of Brasilia, and during this period, he recorded an independent gospel album with his sister Samara. In 2007, Alves and his mother returned to the United States, where Luiz had remained. After Luiz and Raquel divorced, Alves stayed with his mother, and began working to help support her financially. Alves also attended college after returning to the United States, seeking a Pre-Med bachelor's degree. At college, he joined the "Worcester State University Chorale" and took voice lessons with one of the school's vocal coaches. This experience convinced Alves to pursue music professionally.

== The Voice ==
=== The Voice U.S. ===
In April 2013, Alves participated in the blind auditions of the fourth season of The Voice (U.S.), where he sang "Feeling Good". The show's judges—Adam Levine, Blake Shelton, Usher and Shakira—appeared to react positively to the performance, but none of them selected Alves to join their teams. Shakira, visibly regretful, told her colleagues she was going to speak in Portuguese: "Eu adorei você. Acho que você é um cantor realmente bom" which means: "I loved you, I think you are a really good singer"."

=== The Voice Brasil ===
In October 2013, Alves participated in the blind auditions of The Voice Brasil (Brazil), singing Bruno Mars' "When I Was Your Man". All four judges turned their chairs, indicating their interest in working with him. Lulu Santos praised the performance:

For me, it was very interesting to see his delivery to his art. You were not doing it for the audience or the camera, you were doing it for you.

Alves chose Cláudia Leitte as his mentor. The song he performed for his audition was made available for digital download on the iTunes Store and charted at number one, ahead of the original Bruno Mars version. In the second phase of the show, Sam battled Marcela Bueno by singing the song "A Thousand Years" and won. The performance of the two was praised by the songwriter and original interpreter of the song, Christina Perri: "Congrats to both of you. that was my favorite cover so far of A THOUSAND YEARS! absolutamente linda!!!" she said. In the tira-teima phase, Alves decided to sing in Portuguese. He performed the song "Pais e Filhos" of the band Legião Urbana. He was saved by the public, along with Júlia Tazzi, and soon after picked by coach Claudia to continue in her team. In his first performance of the LIVE rounds he sang "Mirrors" and was saved by the Brazilian population, with 59% of the votes. In the semi-final, Alves sang "Você Existe Em Mim", a song originally performed by Leitte. Alves received 20 points from his coach and 84% of the votes of the public, thus qualifying for the finale of the show.

The finale began with the four finalists singing "Não Quero Dinheiro (Só Quero Amar)" from Tim Maia. In his solo performance, Alves sang "Hallelujah" (Leonard Cohen). He next performed a duet with Leitte, in which they sang "A Camisa e o Botão". At the end of the program, Alves was announced the winner of the season, with 43% of the popular votes among the more than 29 million votes.

== Filmography ==
=== Television ===
Year	Title	Role	Notes
2012	The Voice U.S.	Himself	Candidate
2013	Sins of the Preacher	Participation	
2013	The Voice Brasil	Himself	Winner

== Discography ==
=== Studio albums ===
Album list
Album	Details	Sales
Sam Alves	Release: April 1, 2014; Formats: CD, download digital; Record company: Universal Music	Brazil: 30.000
ID	Release: March 31, 2015; Formats: CD, download digital; Record company: Universal Music	Brazil: 15.000

=== Singles ===
List of singles, with positions in the selected charts
Title	Year	Better positions	Album
Title	Year	BRA	Album
"Be with Me"	2014	–	Sam Alves
"Você Merece Mais (Tú Mereces Más)"	2014	–	Sam Alves
"Nosso Vídeo"	2015	54	ID
"Esse Mistério"	2015	88	ID
"Nao Vou Parar"	2016	–	ID

=== Participations ===
- "Pon El Alma En El Juego" – Hit of the Copa América de Chile 2015
- "Intenção" – Duda Ft. Sam Alves (2015)
- "Fôlego" – Dalto Max Ft. Sam Alves (2018)
- "Aquele Amor" – Sam Alves & Freqncy (2019)

== Tours ==
- 2014: Sam Alves Tour
- 2015: ID Tour

== Awards and International nominations ==
Year	Award	Category	Result
2014	Brazilian International Press Awards 2014	Best singer	Won
2014	Multishow Brazilian Music Awards 2014	Experiment	Won
2015	Shorty Awards	Singer	Nominated
2015	Troféu Imprensa 2015	Revelation	Won
2015	Adote um cara	Singer	Nominated
2015	Multishow Brazilian Music Awards 2015	Best singer	Nominated

Awards and achievements
Preceded by Ellen Oléria	The Voice Brasil Winner; 2013	Succeeded by Danilo Reis & Rafael
