= Higher Window =

Single by Josh Groban

from the album Illuminations
- Released: October 25, 2010
- Genre: Pop; classical
- Length: 4:36
- Label: Reprise
- Songwriter(s): Josh Groban
- Producer(s): Rick Rubin

Josh Groban singles chronology
"Voce Existe Em Mim" (2010)	"Higher Window" (2010)	"L'Ora Dell'Addio" (2010)

"Higher Window" is singer-songwriter Josh Groban's third single for his fifth studio album Illuminations.

== Background ==
Josh released three singles for his new album. The first single was "Hidden Away," the second single was his first Portuguese song "Voce Existe Em Mim", and the third single, "Higher Window," was released on October 25, 2010. Rick Rubin produced this single along with the previous single "Hidden Away."

== Charts ==
=== Weekly charts ===
Chart (2010–2011)	Peak position
US Adult Contemporary (Billboard)	19

=== Year-end charts ===
Chart (2011)	Position
US Adult Contemporary (Billboard)	49

== Personnel ==
- Vocals – Josh Groban
- Record producer – Rick Rubin

== Release history ==
Region	Date	Format
United States	October 25, 2010	Music download
