= Você Existe Em Mim =

Single by Josh Groban

from the album Illuminations
- Released: 12 October 2010
- Genre: Pop; classical
- Length: 5:05
- Label: Reprise
- Songwriters: Josh Groban, Lester Mendez, Carlinhos Brown

Josh Groban singles chronology
"Hidden Away" (2010)	"Você Existe Em Mim" (2010)	"Higher Window" (2010)

"Você Existe Em Mim" (English: You Exist in Me) is singer-songwriter Josh Groban's second single for his fifth studio album Illuminations.

== Background ==
This is Groban's interpretation of a Portuguese song written by lyricist Lester Mendez and Brazilian arranger Carlinhos Brown. Groban had worked with Mendez before when duetting on "Silencio" from Nelly Furtado's 2009 Spanish-language album Mi Plan. The song also features an all-girl drum corp Banda Dida. It is Groban's first time singing in Portuguese.

== Cover versions ==
- In 2012, the song was performed by Brazilian pop singer Claudia Leitte and is featured on her second live album, Negalora: Íntimo.
- In 2013, Sam Alves performed the song during the semifinals of the second season of The Voice Brasil. His cover version hit No. 1 on the Brazil iTunes charts.

== Track listing and formats ==
- Digital download
1. "Você Existe Em Mim" – 5:05

== Personnel ==
- Vocals – Josh Groban
- Drums – Banda Dida
- Writers – Josh Groban, Lester Mendez, Carlinhos Brown

== Release history ==
Region	Date	Format
United States	1 October 2010	Music download
