= Josh Groban on Stage =

2015–16 concert tour by Josh Groban

- Promotional poster for tour
- Associated album: Stages; Stages Live
- Start date: September 12, 2015
- End date: August 27, 2016
- Legs: 6
- No. of shows: 55 in North America; 19 in Europe; 4 in Africa; 6 in Oceania; 84 in total

concert chronology
- Summer Symphony Tour (2014); Josh Groban on Stage (2015–16); Bridges Tour (2018–19)

Josh Groban on Stage is a concert tour by American singer Josh Groban. Launched in support of his 2015 show tunes album Stages, the tour featured a night of Broadway songs and originals later on. The tour was announced on April 16, 2015, with dates running from September 12 to November 3, 2015 and tickets going on sale April 24. However, Groban was sick for part of the tour so the first leg ended on December 21, 2015.

== Opening acts and guests ==
- Lena Hall (Performed duets and solo during the first leg)
- Foy Vance (Summer 2016 July 25-August 27)
- Sarah McLachlan (Summer 2016 July 15-August 27)

== Set list ==
2015
- This 2015 set list represents an example as per the Toronto concert

Set I

1. "Pure Imagination"
2. "Try to Remember"
3. "What I Did for Love"
4. "Old Devil Moon"
5. "All I Ask of You" feat. Lena Hall
6. "Save Me"-Lena Hall solo
7. "Anthem"

15-20 minute intermission Set II

1. "Children Will Listen"/"Not While I'm Around"
2. "Les Temps de Cathedrales"
3. "Unusual Way"
4. "Move On" (duet with Lena Hall)
5. "Maybe I'm Amazed" (Lena Hall solo)
6. "Bring Him Home"
7. "You'll Never Walk Alone" (Featuring a Local choir from wherever Groban was performing)

Encore

1. "Over the Rainbow"
2016
- McLachlan setlist
1. "Possession"
2. "I Will Remember You"
3. "Building a Mystery"
4. "Adia"
5. "Beautiful Girl"
6. "World on Fire"
7. "Sweet Surrender"
8. "Loving You Is Easy"
9. "Song for My Father"
10. "Ice Cream"
11. "The Sound that Love Makes"
- Groban's setlist
1. "Pure Imagination"
2. "Try to Remember"
3. "What I Did for Love"
4. "Old Devil Moon"
5. "Alla Luce del Sole"
6. "Vincent"
7. "Aléjate"
8. "Run" (with Sarah McLachlan)
9. "Angel" (with Sarah McLachlan)
10. "February Song"
11. "Canto alla vita"
12. "Dust and Ashes"
13. "Children Will Listen"/"Not While I'm Around"
14. "Les Temps de Cathedrales"
15. "Bring Him Home"
16. "You'll Never Walk Alone"
17. "You Raise Me Up"

Encore

1. "Over the Rainbow"

== Tour dates ==
Date	City	Country	Venue
North America
September 12, 2015	Atlanta	United States	Cobb Energy Performing Arts Centre
September 14, 2015	Washington, D.C.	United States	DAR Constitution Hall
September 16, 2015	Upper Darby	United States	Tower Theater
September 17, 2015	Pittsburgh	United States	Benedum Center
September 19, 2015	New York City	United States	Kings Theatre
September 21, 2015	Toronto	Canada	Sony Centre for the Performing Arts
September 22, 2015	Toronto	Canada	Sony Centre for the Performing Arts
September 25, 2015	Boston	United States	Citi Performing Arts Center
September 26, 2015	Wallingford	United States	Oakdale Theatre
September 29, 2015	New York City	United States	Beacon Theatre
September 30, 2015	New York City	United States	Beacon Theatre
October 2, 2015	Providence	United States	Providence Performing Arts Center
October 3, 2015	Albany	United States	Palace Theatre
October 6, 2015	Syracuse	United States	Landmark Theatre
October 7, 2015	Buffalo	United States	Shea's Performing Arts Center
October 9, 2015	Detroit	United States	Fox Theatre
October 10, 2015	Cleveland	United States	State Theatre
October 13, 2015	Louisville	United States	The Louisville Palace
October 14, 2015	Indianapolis	United States	Old National Centre
October 16, 2015	Chicago	United States	Chicago Theatre
October 17, 2015	Chicago	United States	Chicago Theatre
October 19, 2015	St. Louis	United States	Peabody Opera House
October 29, 2015	Los Angeles	United States	Dolby Theatre
October 30, 2015	Los Angeles	United States	Dolby Theatre
November 3, 2015	San Francisco	United States	Nob Hill Masonic Center
November 4, 2015	San Francisco	United States	Nob Hill Masonic Center
Europe
November 28, 2015	Manchester	England	Bridgewater Hall
November 29, 2015	Birmingham	England	Symphony Hall
December 1, 2015	London	England	Hammersmith Apollo
December 2, 2015	Paris	France	Zénith Paris
North America
December 19, 2015	Austin	United States	Bass Concert Hall
December 21, 2015	Houston	United States	Hobby Center for the Performing Arts
December 22, 2015	Dallas	United States	Music Hall at Fair Park
February 27, 2016	Fort Lauderdale	United States	Au-Rene Theater
February 28, 2016	Sarasota	United States	Van Wezel Performing Arts Hall
March 1, 2016	Clearwater	United States	Ruth Eckerd Hall
March 2, 2016	Orlando	United States	Walt Disney Theater
South Africa and Australia
April 8, 2016	Johannesburg	South Africa	Coca-Cola Dome
April 10, 2016	Durban	South Africa	ICC Arena
April 12, 2016	Cape Town	South Africa	GrandWest
April 13, 2016	Cape Town	South Africa	GrandWest
April 19, 2016	Sydney	Australia	Sydney Opera House
April 20, 2016	Sydney	Australia	Sydney Opera House
April 22, 2016	Sydney	Australia	Sydney Opera House
April 25, 2016	Melbourne	Australia	Palais Theatre
April 28, 2016	Brisbane	Australia	Brisbane Convention Centre
April 30, 2016	Auckland	New Zealand	Vector Arena
Europe
May 5, 2016	Stockholm	Sweden	Stockholm Waterfront
May 6, 2016	Oslo	Norway	Oslo Concert Hall
May 8, 2016	Copenhagen	Denmark	Falkoner Center
May 10, 2016	Berlin	Germany	Tempodrom
May 11, 2016	Frankfurt	Germany	Alte Oper
May 13, 2016	Amsterdam	Netherlands	AFAS Live
May 15, 2016	Ghent	Belgium	Capitole
May 17, 2016	Cardiff	Wales	Motorpoint Arena Cardiff
May 18, 2016	London	England	Royal Albert Hall
May 21, 2016	Birmingham	England	Symphony Hall
May 22, 2016	Nottingham	England	Theatre Royal
May 24, 2016	Glasgow	Scotland	SEC Armadillo
May 25, 2016	Manchester	England	Bridgewater Hall
May 27, 2016	Belfast	Northern Ireland	Waterfront Hall
May 29, 2016	Dublin	Ireland	Bord Gáis Energy Theatre
North America
July 15, 2016	New Orleans	United States	Champions Square
July 17, 2016	Atlanta	United States	Chastain Park Amphitheater
July 22, 2016	Wantagh	United States	Jones Beach Theater
July 23, 2016	Holmdel	United States	PNC Bank Arts Center
July 25, 2016	Saratoga Springs	United States	Saratoga Performing Arts Center
July 26, 2016	Darien	United States	Darien Lake Performing Arts Center
July 29, 2016	Uncasville	United States	Mohegan Sun Arena
July 30, 2016	Boston	United States	Leader Bank Pavilion
August 2, 2016	Burgettstown	United States	KeyBank Pavilion
August 3, 2016	Camden	United States	BB&T Pavilion
August 5, 2016	Atlantic City	United States	Borgata
August 6, 2016	Bristow	United States	Jiffy Lube Live
August 9, 2016	Chicago	United States	Huntington Bank Pavilion
August 10, 2016	Cuyahoga Falls	United States	Blossom Music Center
August 12, 2016	Cincinnati	United States	Riverbend Music Center
August 13, 2016	Clarkston	United States	DTE Energy Music Theatre
August 16, 2016	Kansas City	United States	Starlight Theatre
August 19, 2016	Denver	United States	Pepsi Center
August 20, 2016	West Valley City	United States	USANA Amphitheatre
August 23, 2016	Woodinville	United States	Chateau Ste. Michelle Amphitheatre
August 24, 2016	Troutdale	United States	McMenamins Edgefield Amphitheater
August 26, 2016	Los Angeles	United States	Greek Theatre

=== Box office data ===
Venue	Attendance	Revenue
Chicago Theatre	7,066 / 7,066 (100%)	$671,220
Eventim Apollo	3,479 / 3,603 (97%)	$244,840
Broward Center for the Performing Arts	2,588 / 2,588 (100%)	$274,135
Ruth Eckerd Hall	2,132 / 2,132 (100%)	$282,627
Dr. Phillips Center, Walt Disney Theater	2,640 / 2,711 (97%)	$309,922
Palais Theatre	2,727 / 2,727 (100%)	$324,971
Capitole	1,292 / 1,719 (75%)	$104,212
Clyde Auditorium	2,881 / 2,919 (99%)	$207,536
Chastain Park Amphitheatre	5,769 / 6,700 (86%)	$483,160
Mohegan Sun Arena	5,922 / 6,067 (98%)	$500,136
Total	36,496 / 38,232 (96%)	$3,402,759
