= The Voice Brasil season 2 =

The Voice Brasil
- Season 2
- Hosted by: Tiago Leifert; Miá Mello (Backstage)
- Coaches: Lulu Santos; Carlinhos Brown; Claudia Leitte; Daniel
- No. of contestants: 48
- Winner: Sam Alves
- Winning coach: Claudia Leitte
- Runners-up: Lucy Alves; Pedro Lima; Rubens Daniel

Release
- Original network: Globo
- Original release: October 3 – December 29, 2013

Season chronology
- ← Previous; Season 1 Next → Season 3

The second season of The Voice Brasil premiered on Thursday, October 3, 2013 on Globo in the 10:30 (BRT / AMT) slot, immediately following the primetime telenovela Amor à Vida. Instead of airing on Sundays afternoons, the show is now broadcast on Thursdays nights.

All four of the original coaches returned for this season. Tiago Leifert, the host of the show, also returned. Danni Suzuki was replaced by Miá Mello as the show's backstage correspondent.

On December 29, 2013, Sam Alves from Team Claudia won the competition with 43% of the final vote over Lucy Alves (Team Brown), Pedro Lima (Team Lulu) and Rubens Daniel (Team Daniel). Alves previously sang in the blind auditions of season 4 of The Voice in the United States but failed to make a team.

== Selection process ==
=== Auditions ===
Cities where the auditions were held.

Online applications for The Voice Brasil were open from December 16, 2012 to April 18, 2013. Selected applications were then called to regional auditions held in eight capital cities across Brazil:

Date	Location
May 23, 2013	Natal
May 30, 2013	Belo Horizonte
June 11, 2013	Recife
June 13, 2013	Salvador
June 21, 2013	Brasília
June 28, 2013	Porto Alegre
July 5, 2013	São Paulo
July 12, 2013	Rio de Janeiro

== Teams ==
Key

Winner
Runner-up

Eliminated in the Live Shows
Eliminated in the Live Playoffs

Stolen in the Battles
Eliminated in the Battles

Coaches	Top 48 artists					
Lulu Santos						
Lulu Santos	Pedro Lima	Luana Camarah	Dom Paulinho Lima	Amanda Amado	André & Kadu	Carina Mennitto
Lulu Santos	Luciana Balby	Nando Motta	~~Rully Anne~~	~~Bruna Barreto~~	~~Guto Santanna~~	~~Julia Tazzi~~
Lulu Santos	~~Rafael Furtado~~	~~Rodrigo Castellani~~	Bruna Borges			
Carlinhos Brown						
Carlinhos Brown	Lucy Alves	Marcos Lessa	Rodrigo Castellani	Angelo & Angel	Bruna Barreto	Heverton Castro
Carlinhos Brown	Nene Oliveira	Rafael Furtado	Raíza Rae	~~Herli Dias~~	~~Khrystal~~	~~Samya Nalany~~
Carlinhos Brown	Aila Menezes	Elias Moreira	Simona Talma			
Claudia Leitte						
Claudia Leitte	Sam Alves	Gabby Moura	Khrystal	Rully Anne	Bruna Góes	Débora Cidrack
Claudia Leitte	Guto Santanna	Julia Tazzi	Jullie	Maylssonn	~~Amanda Amado~~	~~Carina Mennitto~~
Claudia Leitte	~~Marcela Bueno~~	Janaína Cruz	Maysa Ohashi	Xandy Monteiro		
Daniel						
Daniel	Rubens Daniel	Cecília Militão	Marcela Bueno	Alessandra Crispin	Ana Lonardi	Anne Marie
Daniel	Gustavo Trebien	Herli Dias	Samya Nalany	~~André & Kadu~~	Gabriella Matos	Kaio Deodato
Daniel	Luiza Lara	Swellen Pimentel	Vivian Lemos			
Note: Italicized names are stolen artists (names struck through within former teams).

== Blind auditions ==
Key

✔	Coach pressed "I WANT YOU" button
	Artist defaulted to a coach's team
	Artist picked a coach's team
	Artist eliminated with no coach pressing their "I WANT YOU" button

Episode	Order	Artist	Age	Hometown	Song	Coach's and contestant's choices			
Episode	Order	Artist	Age	Hometown	Song	Lulu	Brown	Claudia	Daniel
Episode 1 (October 3, 2013)	1	Dom Paulinho Lima	47	São Paulo	"Let's Get It On"	✔	✔	✔	✔
Episode 1 (October 3, 2013)	2	Luciana Balby	26	Rio de Janeiro	"Show das Poderosas"	✔	–	–	–
Episode 1 (October 3, 2013)	3	Dudu Fileti	34	Armazém	"Locked Out of Heaven"	–	–	–	–
Episode 1 (October 3, 2013)	4	Jullie	25	Vila Velha	"Gasolina"	✔	–	✔	–
Episode 1 (October 3, 2013)	5	Angelo & Angel	37–38	Belo Horizonte	"Raiz de Kuntakintê"	–	✔	–	–
Episode 1 (October 3, 2013)	6	Luana Camarah	25	Taubaté	"Highway to Hell"	✔	✔	✔	✔
Episode 1 (October 3, 2013)	7	Felipe Ribeiro	27	Nova Iguaçu	"I Love You Baby"	–	–	–	–
Episode 1 (October 3, 2013)	8	Janaina Cruz	24	Joinville	"I Will Always Love You"	–	–	✔	–
Episode 1 (October 3, 2013)	9	Dan Germano	35	Rio de Janeiro	"Como É Grande o Meu Amor Por Você"	–	–	–	–
Episode 1 (October 3, 2013)	10	Rubens Daniel	30	Araranguá	"I Won't Give Up"	–	–	✔	✔
Episode 1 (October 3, 2013)	11	Simona Talma	33	Natal	"Tango de Nancy"	–	✔	–	–
Episode 1 (October 3, 2013)	12	Gabby Moura	34	Rio de Janeiro	"Coqueiro Verde"	–	✔	✔	✔
Episode 2 (October 10, 2013)	1	Sam Alves	24	Fortaleza	"When I Was Your Man"	✔	✔	✔	✔
Episode 2 (October 10, 2013)	2	Dilauri	24	Fortaleza	"Fica"	–	–	–	–
Episode 2 (October 10, 2013)	3	Luiza Lara	27	Divinópolis	"Sobre Todas As Coisas"	–	–	–	✔
Episode 2 (October 10, 2013)	4	Pedro Lima	24	Nova Iguaçu	"Beautiful"	✔	–	–	–
Episode 2 (October 10, 2013)	5	Bruna Barreto	28	Salvador	"Disritmia"	✔	–	✔	✔
Episode 2 (October 10, 2013)	6	Herli Dias	26	Cidade Ocidental	"Essa Tal Liberdade"	–	✔	–	–
Episode 2 (October 10, 2013)	7	Nicole Cyrne	23	Rio de Janeiro	"Fallin'"	–	–	–	–
Episode 2 (October 10, 2013)	8	Lucy Alves	27	João Pessoa	"Qui Nem Jiló"	✔	✔	–	–
Episode 2 (October 10, 2013)	9	Ana Lonardi	26	Porto Alegre	"Não Dá Mais Para Segurar"	–	–	–	✔
Episode 2 (October 10, 2013)	10	Bruna Borges	23	Recife	"Nada por Mim"	✔	–	–	–
Episode 2 (October 10, 2013)	11	Aila Menezes	25	Salvador	"A Loba"	–	✔	–	–
Episode 2 (October 10, 2013)	12	Débora Cidrack	30	Fortaleza	"Stronger (What Doesn't Kill You)"	–	✔	✔	–
Episode 2 (October 10, 2013)	13	Juju Gomes	31	Rio de Janeiro	"Ideologia"	–	–	–	–
Episode 3 (October 17, 2013)	1	Anne Marie	24	Guarujá	"Muito Pouco"	✔	–	–	✔
Episode 3 (October 17, 2013)	2	Maysa Ohashi	22	Jacareí	"If I Ain't Got You"	—	✔	✔	–
Episode 3 (October 17, 2013)	3	Marcos Lessa	22	Fortaleza	"O Morro Não Tem Vez"	–	✔	–	✔
Episode 3 (October 17, 2013)	4	Marcelo Holanda	23	Fortaleza	"Ainda é Cedo"	–	–	–	–
Episode 3 (October 17, 2013)	5	Rodrigo Castelanni	34	Rio de Janeiro	"Higher Ground"	✔	✔	✔	✔
Episode 3 (October 17, 2013)	6	Rafael Furtado	24	Recife	"Don't Look Back in Anger"	✔	✔	–	✔
Episode 3 (October 17, 2013)	7	Clariana Fróes	18	Salvador	"À Sua Maneira"	–	–	–	–
Episode 3 (October 17, 2013)	8	Raíza Rae	23	São Paulo	"Tão Seu"	–	✔	–	✔
Episode 3 (October 17, 2013)	9	Bruna Góes	20	Florianópolis	"Proud Mary"	–	✔	✔	–
Episode 3 (October 17, 2013)	10	Stephanie Serrat	24	Rio de Janeiro	"Chega de Saudade"	–	–	–	–
Episode 3 (October 17, 2013)	11	André & Kadu	28–27	São Paulo	"24 Horas de Você"	–	–	–	✔
Episode 3 (October 17, 2013)	12	Alessandra Crispin	25	Juiz de Fora	"A Ordem é Samba"	–	–	–	✔
Episode 3 (October 17, 2013)	13	Kaio Deodato	22	Niterói	"Um Amor Puro"	–	✔	–	✔
Episode 4 (October 24, 2013)	1	Gustavo Trebien	27	União da Vitória	"I Still Haven't Found What I'm Looking For"	✔	–	✔	✔
Episode 4 (October 24, 2013)	2	Heverton Castro	31	Cachoeiras de Macacu	"Posso Sentir"	–	✔	–	✔
Episode 4 (October 24, 2013)	3	Claire Nativel	28	Réunion, France	"I Don't Know"	–	–	–	–
Episode 4 (October 24, 2013)	4	Samya Nalany	24	Campinas	"Maracatu Atômico"	–	✔	–	–
Episode 4 (October 24, 2013)	5	Guto Santanna	27	Brasília	"Stand by Me"	✔	–	✔	✔
Episode 4 (October 24, 2013)	6	Thayna & Thaynara	30	São Paulo	"Malandragem"	–	–	–	–
Episode 4 (October 24, 2013)	7	Cecília Militão	33	Jacarei	"If I Were a Boy"	✔	–	✔	✔
Episode 4 (October 24, 2013)	8	Xandy Monteiro	32	Porto Alegre	"Desafio"	–	–	✔	–
Episode 4 (October 24, 2013)	9	Ariel Mançanares	20	São João da Boa Vista	"Born This Way"	–	–	–	–
Episode 4 (October 24, 2013)	10	Carina Mennitto	22	Campinas	"Kiss"	–	–	✔	–
Episode 4 (October 24, 2013)	11	Swellen Pimentel	19	Natal	"Ovelha Negra"	✔	–	–	✔
Episode 4 (October 24, 2013)	12	Amanda Amado	20	Macaé	"Trajetória"	–	✔	✔	✔
Episode 5 (October 31, 2013)	1	Khrystal	32	Natal	"Morô?"	–	✔	✔	✔
Episode 5 (October 31, 2013)	2	Rully Anne	24	São Paulo	"Don't Stop Believin'"	✔	✔	✔	✔
Episode 5 (October 31, 2013)	3	Simone Shuester	29	Harmonia	"Brasil"	–	–	–	–
Episode 5 (October 31, 2013)	4	Elias Moreira	27	Manaus	"Human Nature"	✔	✔	✔	✔
Episode 5 (October 31, 2013)	5	Júlia Tazzi	22	Salvador	"Lady Marmalade"	✔	✔	✔	✔
Episode 5 (October 31, 2013)	6	Amanda Chaves	22	Itabuna	"Eu Sou Neguinha"	–	–	–	–
Episode 5 (October 31, 2013)	7	Maylssonn	23	Salvador	"Separação"	✔	✔	✔	–
Episode 5 (October 31, 2013)	8	Gabriella Matos	19	São Paulo	"Whole Lotta Love"	✔	✔	✔	✔
Episode 5 (October 31, 2013)	9	Nando Motta	33	Niterói	"Nós"	✔	–	–	–
Episode 5 (October 31, 2013)	10	Vivian Lemos	25	Londrina	"Back to Black"	Team full	–	✔	✔
Episode 5 (October 31, 2013)	11	Marcela Bueno	18	Jundiaí	"Jeito de Mato"	Team full	–	✔	Team full
Episode 5 (October 31, 2013)	12	Nenê Oliveira	24	Nova Iguaçu	"Love Song"	Team full	✔	Team full	Team full

== Battles ==
Coaches' advisors
Lulu Santos	Carlinhos Brown	Claudia Leitte	Daniel
Gaby Amarantos	Rogerio Flausino	Maria Gadú	Luiza Possi

Key

Artist won the Battle and advanced to the Live shows
Artist lost the Battle but was stolen by another coach and advanced to the Live shows
Artist lost the Battle and was eliminated

Episode	Coach	Order	Winner	Song	Loser	Steal result			
Episode	Coach	Order	Winner	Song	Loser	Lulu	Brown	Claudia	Daniel
Episode 6 (November 7, 2013)	Lulu	1	Dom Paulinho Lima	"Imunização Racional"	Rodrigo Castelanni	N/A	✔	✔	✔
Episode 6 (November 7, 2013)	Daniel	2	Anne Marie	"Máscara"	Gabriella Matos	–	–	–	N/A
Episode 6 (November 7, 2013)	Claudia	3	Sam Alves	"A Thousand Years"	Marcela Bueno	✔	✔	N/A	✔
Episode 6 (November 7, 2013)	Brown	4	Lucy Alves	"Isso Aqui Tá Bom Demais"	Khrystal	–	N/A	✔	–
Episode 6 (November 7, 2013)	Claudia	5	Bruna Góes	"Ain't No Mountain High Enough"	Maysa Ohashi	–	–	N/A	–
Episode 6 (November 7, 2013)	Brown	6	Marcos Lessa	"É Hoje"	Aila Menezes	–	N/A	–	–
Episode 6 (November 7, 2013)	Lulu	7	Luciana Balby	"Luz dos Olhos"	Bruna Borges	N/A	–	–	–
Episode 6 (November 7, 2013)	Daniel	8	Ana Lonardi	"O Meu Amor"	Luiza Lara	–	–	–	N/A
Episode 7 (November 14, 2013)	Lulu	1	Luana Camarah	"Blues da Piedade"	Bruna Barreto	N/A	✔	–	–
Episode 7 (November 14, 2013)	Daniel	2	Cecilia Militão	"Try"	Vivian Lemos	–	–	–	N/A
Episode 7 (November 14, 2013)	Daniel	3	Gustavo Trebien	"Apenas Mais Uma de Amor"	André & Kadu	✔	–	–	N/A
Episode 7 (November 14, 2013)	Claudia	4	Gabby Moura	"Resposta ao Tempo"	Amanda Amado	✔	–	N/A	✔
Episode 7 (November 14, 2013)	Lulu	5	Pedro Lima	"Baby Can I Hold You"	Guto Santanna	N/A	–	✔	–
Episode 7 (November 14, 2013)	Brown	6	Raíza Rae	"Quase Sem Querer"	Simona Talma	–	N/A	–	–
Episode 7 (November 14, 2013)	Claudia	7	Jullie	"Super Duper Love"	Carina Mennitto	✔	–	N/A	–
Episode 7 (November 14, 2013)	Brown	8	Heverton Castro	"Boa Noite"	Samya Nalany	Team full	N/A	—	✔
Episode 8 (November 21, 2013)	Lulu	1	Nando Motta	"Eleanor Rigby"	Rafael Furtado	Team full	✔	–	–
Episode 8 (November 21, 2013)	Daniel	2	Rubens Daniel	"O Segundo Sol"	Swellen Pimentel	Team full	Team full	–	N/A
Episode 8 (November 21, 2013)	Brown	3	Angelo & Angel	"Vidro Fumê"	Herli Dias	Team full	Team full	–	✔
Episode 8 (November 21, 2013)	Brown	4	Nene Oliveira	"One" / "Isn't She Lovely?"	Elias Moreira	Team full	Team full	–	Team full
Episode 8 (November 21, 2013)	Lulu	5	Rully Anne	"Girl on Fire"	Júlia Tazzi	Team full	Team full	✔	Team full
Episode 8 (November 21, 2013)	Claudia	6	Maylssom	"Adeus, América"	Xandy Monteiro	Team full	Team full	Team full	Team full
Episode 8 (November 21, 2013)	Claudia	7	Débora Cidrak	"Titanium"	Janaína Cruz	Team full	Team full	Team full	Team full
Episode 8 (November 21, 2013)	Daniel	8	Alessandra Crispin	"Aquele Abraço"	Kaio Deodato	Team full	Team full	Team full	Team full

== Live shows ==
In this season, for the first time, only viewers from Southern, Southeast, Northeastern, Central-Western time zones vote during the live broadcasts, while viewers in the Amazon time zone (minus Amapá, Pará and Tocantins) are cued to vote to save artists on the show's official website during the delayed broadcast. For the final, the lines were opened right after the semifinal results and remaining opened until the live finale, so all the country was able to vote for the winner.

Key

Artist was saved by public's vote
Artist was saved by his/her coach
Artist was saved by another coach
Artist was eliminated
Artist was eliminated immediately

=== Week 1: Playoffs ===
Episode	Coach	Order	Artist	Song	Result
Episode 9 (November 28, 2013)	Lulu Santos	1	Luana Camarah	"Sweet Child o' Mine"	Coach's choice
Episode 9 (November 28, 2013)	Lulu Santos	2	Luciana Balby	"Jorge Maravilha"	Public's vote (16%)
Episode 9 (November 28, 2013)	Lulu Santos	3	Rully Anne	"Elevador"	Saved by Claudia
Episode 9 (November 28, 2013)	Lulu Santos	4	Carina Mennitto	"Chain of Fools"	Public's vote (14%)
Episode 9 (November 28, 2013)	Lulu Santos	5	Nando Motta	"Dois Rios"	Eliminated
Episode 9 (November 28, 2013)	Lulu Santos	6	Pedro Lima	"I'll Be There"	Coach's choice
Episode 9 (November 28, 2013)	Carlinhos Brown	7	Nene Oliveira	"Mutante"	Public's vote (20%)
Episode 9 (November 28, 2013)	Carlinhos Brown	8	Raíza Rae	"Vento"	Eliminated
Episode 9 (November 28, 2013)	Carlinhos Brown	9	Rodrigo Castellani	"Maybe I'm Amazed"	Coach's choice
Episode 9 (November 28, 2013)	Claudia Leitte	10	Bruna Goés	"Wake Me Up"	Public's vote (12%)
Episode 9 (November 28, 2013)	Claudia Leitte	11	Júlia Tazzi	"Puro Êxtase"	Eliminated
Episode 9 (November 28, 2013)	Claudia Leitte	12	Sam Alves	"Pais e Filhos"	Coach's choice
Episode 9 (November 28, 2013)	Claudia Leitte	13	Guto Santanna	"Não Vá Embora"	Eliminated
Episode 9 (November 28, 2013)	Claudia Leitte	14	Khrystal	"Carne"	Coach's choice
Episode 9 (November 28, 2013)	Claudia Leitte	15	Maylssonn	"Condição"	Public's vote (13%)
Episode 9 (November 28, 2013)	Daniel	16	Ana Lonardi	"Para Ver As Meninas"	Eliminated
Episode 9 (November 28, 2013)	Daniel	17	Cecília Militão	"Minha Alma (A Paz Que Eu Não Quero)"	Coach's choice
Episode 9 (November 28, 2013)	Daniel	18	Samya Nalany	"Quase Um Segundo"	Public's vote (12%)

=== Week 2: Playoffs ===
Episode	Coach	Order	Artist	Song	Result
Episode 10 (December 5, 2013)	Carlinhos Brown	1	Angelo & Angel	"Te Amo Cada Vez Mais"	Eliminated
Episode 10 (December 5, 2013)	Carlinhos Brown	2	Heverton Castro	"Sexual Healing"	Public's vote (13%)
Episode 10 (December 5, 2013)	Carlinhos Brown	3	Lucy Alves	"Segue o Seco"	Coach's choice
Episode 10 (December 5, 2013)	Carlinhos Brown	4	Bruna Barreto	"Podres Poderes"	Public's vote (14%)
Episode 10 (December 5, 2013)	Carlinhos Brown	5	Marcos Lessa	"Quem Te Viu, Quem Te Vê"	Coach's choice
Episode 10 (December 5, 2013)	Carlinhos Brown	6	Rafael Furtado	"Por Que a Gente é Assim"	Eliminated
Episode 10 (December 5, 2013)	Daniel	7	Alessandra Crispin	"Cai Dentro"	Public's vote (20%)
Episode 10 (December 5, 2013)	Daniel	8	Anne Marie	"One and Only"	Eliminated
Episode 10 (December 5, 2013)	Daniel	9	Marcela Bueno	"Amor de Índio"	Coach's choice
Episode 10 (December 5, 2013)	Daniel	10	Gustavo Trebien	"Heaven"	Eliminated
Episode 10 (December 5, 2013)	Daniel	11	Herli Dias	"Quando Amanhecer"	Public's vote (11%)
Episode 10 (December 5, 2013)	Daniel	12	Rubens Daniel	"Yellow"	Coach's choice
Episode 10 (December 5, 2013)	Lulu Santos	13	Amanda Amado	"Tanta Saudade"	Public's vote (11%)
Episode 10 (December 5, 2013)	Lulu Santos	14	André & Kadu	"Só Hoje"	Eliminated
Episode 10 (December 5, 2013)	Lulu Santos	15	Dom Paulinho Lima	"Georgia on My Mind"	Coach's choice
Episode 10 (December 5, 2013)	Claudia Leitte	16	Débora Cidrak	"Logo Eu"	Public's vote (27%)
Episode 10 (December 5, 2013)	Claudia Leitte	17	Gabby Moura	"Pescador de Ilusões"	Coach's choice
Episode 10 (December 5, 2013)	Claudia Leitte	18	Jullie	"Os Outros"	Eliminated

=== Week 3: Quarterfinals ===
Episode	Coach	Order	Artist	Song	Result
Episode 11 (December 12, 2013)	Claudia Leitte	1	Gabby Moura	"Sorri"	Coach's choice
Episode 11 (December 12, 2013)	Claudia Leitte	2	Khrystal	"Lamento Sertanejo"	Eliminated
Episode 11 (December 12, 2013)	Claudia Leitte	3	Rully Anne	"Bete Balanço"	Eliminated
Episode 11 (December 12, 2013)	Claudia Leitte	4	Sam Alves	"Mirrors"	Public's vote (59%)
Episode 11 (December 12, 2013)	Lulu Santos	5	Dom Paulinho Lima	"BR3"	Eliminated
Episode 11 (December 12, 2013)	Lulu Santos	6	Luana Camarah	"Back in Black"	Coach's choice
Episode 11 (December 12, 2013)	Lulu Santos	7	Pedro Lima	"Se Eu Não Te Amasse Tanto Assim"	Public's vote (39%)
Episode 11 (December 12, 2013)	Carlinhos Brown	8	Lucy Alves	"Disparada"	Public's vote (61%)
Episode 11 (December 12, 2013)	Carlinhos Brown	9	Marcos Lessa	"Arrastão"	Coach's choice
Episode 11 (December 12, 2013)	Carlinhos Brown	10	Rodrigo Castellani	"Gita"	Eliminated
Episode 11 (December 12, 2013)	Daniel	11	Cecília Militão	"Balada do Louco"	Coach's choice
Episode 11 (December 12, 2013)	Daniel	12	Marcela Bueno	"No Meu Coração Você Vai Sempre Estar"	Eliminated
Episode 11 (December 12, 2013)	Daniel	13	Rubens Daniel	"Loucas Horas"	Public's vote (45%)

=== Week 4: Semifinals ===
Episode	Coach	Order	Artist	Song	Result (in points)		
Episode	Coach	Order	Artist	Song	Coach	Public	Total
Episode 12 (December 19, 2013)	Lulu Santos	1	Luana Camarah	"Hoje Ainda É Dia de Rock"	10	34	44
Episode 12 (December 19, 2013)	Lulu Santos	2	Pedro Lima	"Coleção"	20	66	86
Episode 12 (December 19, 2013)	Carlinhos Brown	3	Lucy Alves	"Festa do Interior"	15	67	82
Episode 12 (December 19, 2013)	Carlinhos Brown	4	Marcos Lessa	"Travessia"	15	33	48
Episode 12 (December 19, 2013)	Daniel	5	Cecília Militão	"Meu Grande Amor"	15	32	47
Episode 12 (December 19, 2013)	Daniel	6	Rubens Daniel	"Yesterday"	15	68	83
Episode 12 (December 19, 2013)	Claudia Leitte	7	Gabby Moura	"Alguém Me Avisou"	10	16	26
Episode 12 (December 19, 2013)	Claudia Leitte	8	Sam Alves	"Você Existe Em Mim"	20	84	104

=== Week 5: Finals ===
Episode	Coach	Artist	Order	Song	Order	Song (Duet with coach)	Result
Episode 13 (December 26, 2013)	Claudia Leitte	Sam Alves	1	"Aleluia / Hallelujah"	4	"A Camisa e o Botão"	Winner (43%)
Episode 13 (December 26, 2013)	Carlinhos Brown	Lucy Alves	5	"De Volta Pro Aconchego"	8	"Você, o Amor e Eu"	Runner-up
Episode 13 (December 26, 2013)	Lulu Santos	Pedro Lima	3	"Me Dê Motivo"	2	"Sócio do Amor"	Runner-up
Episode 13 (December 26, 2013)	Daniel	Rubens Daniel	7	"Monte Castelo"	6	"Bridge over Troubled Water"	Runner-up

== Elimination chart ==
Key

- Team Lulu
- Team Brown
- Team Claudia
- Team Daniel

Results

- Winner
- Runner-up
- Saved by the public
- Saved by the coach
- Advanced to the finals
- Eliminated

Live shows' results
Artist	Week 1	Week 2	Week 3	Week 4	Week 5
Sam Alves	Safe		Safe	Advanced	Winner
Lucy Alves		Safe	Safe	Advanced	Runner-up
Pedro Lima	Safe		Safe	Advanced	Runner-up
Rubens Daniel		Safe	Safe	Advanced	Runner-up
Cecília Militão	Safe		Safe	Eliminated	Eliminated (week 4)
Gabby Moura		Safe	Safe	Eliminated	Eliminated (week 4)
Luana Camarah	Safe		Safe	Eliminated	Eliminated (week 4)
Marcos Lessa		Safe	Safe	Eliminated	Eliminated (week 4)
Dom Paulinho Lima		Safe	Eliminated	Eliminated (week 3)	
Khrystal	Safe		Eliminated	Eliminated (week 3)	
Marcela Bueno		Safe	Eliminated	Eliminated (week 3)	
Rodrigo Castellani	Safe		Eliminated	Eliminated (week 3)	
Rully Anne	Safe		Eliminated	Eliminated (week 3)	
Alessandra Crispin		Eliminated	Eliminated (week 2)		
Amanda Amado		Eliminated	Eliminated (week 2)		
André & Kadu		Eliminated	Eliminated (week 2)		
Angelo & Angel		Eliminated	Eliminated (week 2)		
Anne Marie		Eliminated	Eliminated (week 2)		
Bruna Barreto		Eliminated	Eliminated (week 2)		
Débora Cidrak		Eliminated	Eliminated (week 2)		
Gustavo Trebien		Eliminated	Eliminated (week 2)		
Herli Dias		Eliminated	Eliminated (week 2)		
Heverton Castro		Eliminated	Eliminated (week 2)		
Jullie		Eliminated	Eliminated (week 2)		
Rafael Furtado		Eliminated	Eliminated (week 2)		
Ana Lonardi	Eliminated	Eliminated (week 1)			
Bruna Góes	Eliminated	Eliminated (week 1)			
Carina Mennitto	Eliminated	Eliminated (week 1)			
Guto Santanna	Eliminated	Eliminated (week 1)			
Julia Tazzi	Eliminated	Eliminated (week 1)			
Luciana Balby	Eliminated	Eliminated (week 1)			
Maylssonn	Eliminated	Eliminated (week 1)			
Nando Motta	Eliminated	Eliminated (week 1)			
Nene Oliveira	Eliminated	Eliminated (week 1)			
Raíza Rae	Eliminated	Eliminated (week 1)			
Samya Nalany	Eliminated	Eliminated (week 1)			

== Ratings and reception ==
=== Brazilian ratings ===
All numbers are in points and provided by Kantar Ibope Media.

Episode	Title	Air date	Timeslot (BRT)	SP viewers (in points)	Source
1	Blind Auditions 1	October 3, 2013	Thursday 10:30 p.m.	24	
2	Blind Auditions 2	October 10, 2013	Thursday 10:30 p.m.	26	
3	Blind Auditions 3	October 17, 2013	Thursday 10:30 p.m.	26	
4	Blind Auditions 4	October 24, 2013	Thursday 10:30 p.m.	24	
5	Blind Auditions 5	October 31, 2013	Thursday 10:30 p.m.	28	
6	Battles 1	November 7, 2013	Thursday 10:30 p.m.	26	
7	Battles 2	November 14, 2013	Thursday 10:30 p.m.	25	
8	Battles 3	November 21, 2013	Thursday 10:30 p.m.	27	
9	Playoffs 1	November 28, 2013	Thursday 10:30 p.m.	25	
10	Playoffs 2	December 5, 2013	Thursday 10:30 p.m.	24	
11	Quarterfinals	December 12, 2013	Thursday 10:30 p.m.	26	
12	Semifinals	December 19, 2013	Thursday 10:30 p.m.	26	
13	Finals	December 26, 2013	Thursday 10:30 p.m.	27	

- In 2013, each point represents 62.000 households in São Paulo.
