= All That Echoes =

Studio album by Josh Groban
- Released: February 5, 2013
- Recorded: December 2011–January 2013
- Studio: Los Angeles
- Genre: Operatic pop; classical; classical crossover; pop rock
- Label: Reprise
- Producer: Rob Cavallo; Lester Mendez; Walter Afanasieff

Josh Groban chronology
Illuminations (2010)	All That Echoes (2013)	Stages (2015)

Singles from All That Echoes
- 1. "Brave" Released: December 18, 2012; 2. "I Believe (When I Fall in Love It Will Be Forever)" Released: June 25, 2013

Professional ratings
Aggregate scores
Source	Rating
Metacritic	69/100
Review scores
Source	Rating
AllMusic	4/5 stars

All That Echoes is the sixth studio album by American singer-songwriter Josh Groban, produced by Rob Cavallo. The album debuted at number one on the Billboard 200, selling 145,000 copies in its first week. The album has sold 532,000 copies in the United States as of April 2015.

== Background ==
On November 18, 2012, the album was announced, revealing the cover art, title, and date of release: February 5, 2013. It was available for preorder through retailer Amazon.com on November 27. Groban has recorded cover songs by Stevie Wonder and Glen Hansard for the album. The first track, "Brave", was released as a single on December 18, 2012. Groban promoted the album with the All That Echoes World Tour.

== Track listing ==
No.	Title	Writer(s)	Producer(s)	Length
1.	"Brave"	Josh Groban, Tawgs Salter, Chantal Kreviazuk	Rob Cavallo	3:59
2.	"False Alarms"	Groban, Lester Mendez	Cavallo	4:33
3.	"Falling Slowly"	Glen Hansard, Markéta Irglová	Cavallo	4:20
4.	"She Moved Through the Fair"	Traditional	Cavallo	4:55
5.	"Below the Line"	Groban, Salter, Simon Wilcox	Cavallo	3:28
6.	"E ti prometterò" (featuring Laura Pausini)	Groban, Mendez, Salter, Marco Marinangeli	Mendez	3:56
7.	"The Moon Is a Harsh Mistress"	Jimmy Webb	Cavallo	3:45
8.	"Un alma más" (featuring Arturo Sandoval)	Groban, Mendez, Salter, Claudia Brant	Mendez	4:10
9.	"Happy in My Heartache"	Groban, Salter	Cavallo	3:08
10.	"Hollow Talk"	Jannis Makrigiannis, Anders Rhedin, Frederik Nordsø	Cavallo	5:34
11.	"Sincera"	Groban, Walter Afanasieff, Marinangeli	Afanasieff	3:35
12.	"I Believe (When I Fall in Love It Will Be Forever)"	Stevie Wonder, Yvonne Wright	Cavallo	5:58
Total length:				51:21

Fan Edition
No.	Title	Writer(s)	Length
13.	"Changing Colours"	Dekker	4:48
14.	"Satellite"	Matthews	4:15
15.	"Grazie"	Groban, Afanasieff, Marinangeli	4:17
Total length:			1:04:43

Target Edition, Canadian Deluxe Edition, Deluxe Edition bonus tracks
No.	Title	Writer(s)	Length
13.	"Changing Colours"	Dekker	4:48
14.	"Satellite"	Matthews	4:15
15.	"Grazie"	Groban, Afanasieff, Marinangeli	4:17
16.	"Play Me"	Catalano, Diamond	3:28
Total length:			1:08:15

Japanese edition bonus track
No.	Title	Writer(s)	Length
13.	"Kono Saki no Michi"	Takatsugu Muramatsu	5:01
Total length:			56:22

== Personnel ==
- Josh Groban – vocals, piano, e-bow, additional drums
- Curt Bisquera – drums
- Chris Chaney – bass guitar
- Tim Pierce – guitar
- Ramon Stagnaro – acoustic guitar, charango
- Carlos del Puerto – bass guitar
- Arturo Sandoval – trumpet
- Walter Afanasieff – piano
- Paul Bushnell – bass guitar
- Luis Conte – percussion
- Matt Chamberlain – drums
- Eleanore Choate – harp
- Sean Hurley – bass guitar
- Jamie Muhoberac – keyboards, piano
- Abe Laboriel Jr. – drums, percussion
- Rob Cavallo – acoustic guitar, piano, additional bass guitar
- Dan Chase – drum programming, synthesizer
- André Manga – bass guitar
- Eric Rigler – bagpipes, low whistle
- Lester Mendez – synthesizer, programming

== Charts ==
=== Weekly charts ===
Chart (2013)	Peak position
Australian Albums (ARIA)	11
Austrian Albums (Ö3 Austria)	18
Belgian Albums (Ultratop Flanders)	38
Belgian Albums (Ultratop Wallonia)	20
Canadian Albums (Billboard)	1
Danish Albums (Hitlisten)	10
Dutch Albums (Album Top 100)	3
Finnish Albums (Suomen virallinen lista)	12
French Albums (SNEP)	42
German Albums (Offizielle Top 100)	18
Irish Albums (IRMA)	11
New Zealand Albums (RMNZ)	3
Norwegian Albums (VG-lista)	3
Scottish Albums (OCC)	6
South African Albums (RISA)	2
Swedish Albums (Sverigetopplistan)	11
Swiss Albums (Schweizer Hitparade)	21
UK Albums (OCC)	9
US Billboard 200	1

=== Year-end charts ===
Chart (2013)	Position
Belgian Albums (Ultratop Wallonia)	195
Dutch Albums (Album Top 100)	80
UK Albums (OCC)	118
US Billboard 200	57

== Certifications ==
Region	Certification	Certified units/sales
Canada (Music Canada)	Gold	40,000^{^}
United Kingdom (BPI)	Silver	60,000^{^}
United States (RIAA)	Gold	500,000^{‡}
^{^} Shipments figures based on certification alone.^{‡} Sales+streaming figures based on certification alone.
