= Illuminations (Josh Groban album) =

Studio album by Josh Groban
- Released: November 15, 2010
- Recorded: Spring 2008–Summer 2010
- Studio: Los Angeles, London.
- Genre: Operatic pop; classical; classical crossover; pop rock
- Label: 143; Reprise
- Producer: Rick Rubin

Josh Groban chronology
A Collection (2008)	Illuminations (2010)	All That Echoes (2013)

Singles from Illuminations
- 1. "Hidden Away" Released: September 13, 2010; 2. "Você Existe Em Mim" Released: October 12, 2010; 3. "Higher Window" Released: October 25, 2010; 4. "L'Ora Dell'Addio" Released: November 9, 2010; 5. "If I Walk Away" Released: January 12, 2012

Illuminations is the fifth studio album by American singer-songwriter Josh Groban, produced by Rick Rubin. Similar to his previous albums, Illuminations contains songs sung in a variety of languages, including his first take on a Portuguese song, "Você Existe Em Mim", which Groban co-wrote with Lester Mendez and Carlinhos Brown. The album was released on November 15, 2010.

== Album information ==
The official title and cover art for Illuminations was revealed in September 2010. In addition to the regular release, a special fan edition of the album is available for purchase on Groban's website that contains the original CD, a "making-of" DVD, a 48-page color photo book filled with lyrics and pictures, and two bonus tracks (to be delivered digitally).

The first single from the album, "Hidden Away", was released on September 13, and was also available to download for free on Groban's website and Facebook from September 8–13.

Leading up to the album's release, iTunes released songs periodically from the album to download, which began on October 12 with the release of the album's Portuguese song "Você Existe Em Mim". A third song, "Higher Window", was released on October 25. A fourth and final song, "L'Ora Dell'Addio", was released on November 9.

Beginning May 12, 2011, Groban embarked on a worldwide tour entitled the Straight to You Tour to promote the album.

== Reception ==
=== Critical reception ===
Professional ratings
Aggregate scores
Source	Rating
Metacritic	79/100
Review scores
Source	Rating
Allmusic	4/5 stars
BBC Music	positive
The Boston Globe	positive
Entertainment Weekly	(B+)

Illuminations received mostly positive reviews from music critics.

=== Commercial reception ===
The album debuted at No. 4 on the Billboard 200, selling 190,000 copies in its first week and was certified platinum by the RIAA for shipping over a million copies. The album has since sold over 800,000 copies in the US. In Canada, the album debuted at No. 4 on the Canadian Albums Chart and was certified platinum for shipping over 80,000 copies.

== Track listing ==
The following is the track listing for the regular album:

No.	Title	Writer(s)	Length
1.	"The Wandering Kind (Prelude)"	Josh Groban	2:28
2.	"Bells of New York City"	Groban, Dan Wilson	3:50
3.	"Galileo (Someone Like You)"	Declan O'Rourke, Seamus Cotter	3:22
4.	"L'ora dell'addio (Farewell Time)"	Groban, Walter Afanasieff, Marco Marinangeli	3:28
5.	"Hidden Away"	Groban, Wilson	3:56
6.	"Au jardin des sans-pourquoi (The Garden Without "Whys")"	Groban, Rufus Wainwright, Kate McGarrigle	3:32
7.	"Higher Window"	Groban, Wilson, Thomas Salter	4:37
8.	"If I Walk Away"	Groban, Wilson	3:52
9.	"Love Only Knows"	Groban, Wilson	4:44
10.	"Você Existe Em Mim"	Groban, Lester Mendez, Carlinhos Brown	5:07
11.	"War at Home"	Groban, Wilson	4:45
12.	"London Hymn"	Groban, Marius de Vries	1:57
13.	"Straight to You"	Nick Cave	4:10
Total length:			49:52

iTunes Deluxe Edition
No.	Title	Writer(s)	Length
14.	"Feels Like Home"	Randy Newman	5:08
15.	"Hidden Away" (Radio mix) (Bonus video)

Japanese Edition/Exclusive Fan Edition
No.	Title	Writer(s)	Length
14.	"They Won't Go When I Go"	Stevie Wonder, Yvonne Wright	4:48
15.	"Le Cose Che Sei Per Me"	Brendan Graham, Rolf Løvland	3:31

South African Tour Edition
No.	Title	Writer(s)	Length
14.	"They Won't Go When I Go"	Stevie Wonder, Yvonne Wright	4:48
15.	"Le Cose Che Sei Per Me"	Brendan Graham, Rolf Løvland	3:31
16.	"Feels Like Home"	Randy Newman	5:08
Total length:			63:24

- Orchestra and Choir arranged and conducted by David Campbell
- Mixed by Allen Sides, except "War At Home" mixed by Andrew Scheps

== Charts ==
=== Weekly charts ===
Chart (2010)	Peak position
Australian Albums (ARIA)	21
Austrian Albums (Ö3 Austria)	29
Belgian Albums (Ultratop Flanders)	100
Belgian Albums (Ultratop Wallonia)	42
Canadian Albums (Billboard)	4
Dutch Albums (Album Top 100)	10
European Top 100 Albums	33
Finnish Albums (Suomen virallinen lista)	20
French Albums (SNEP)	48
German Albums (Offizielle Top 100)	42
Irish Albums (IRMA)	12
Mexican Albums (AMPROFON)	99
Norwegian Albums (VG-lista)	17
New Zealand Albums (RMNZ)	9
Scottish Albums (OCC)	25
Swedish Albums (Sverigetopplistan)	22
Swiss Albums (Schweizer Hitparade)	46
UK Albums (OCC)	30
US Billboard 200	4
US Digital Albums (Billboard)	9
US Indie Store Album Sales (Billboard)	13

=== Year-end charts ===
Chart (2010)	Position
Australian Albums (ARIA)	99
New Zealand Albums (RMNZ)	35

Chart (2011)	Position
Canadian Albums (Billboard)	20
US Billboard 200	24

== Certifications ==
Region	Certification	Certified units/sales
Canada (Music Canada)	Platinum	80,000^{^}
Ireland (IRMA)	Gold	7,500^{^}
New Zealand (RMNZ)	Gold	7,500^{^}
United Kingdom (BPI)	Silver	60,000^{^}
United States (RIAA)	Platinum	1,000,000^{^}
^{^} Shipments figures based on certification alone.
