= Eric Lewis (pianist) =

American jazz pianist (born 1973)

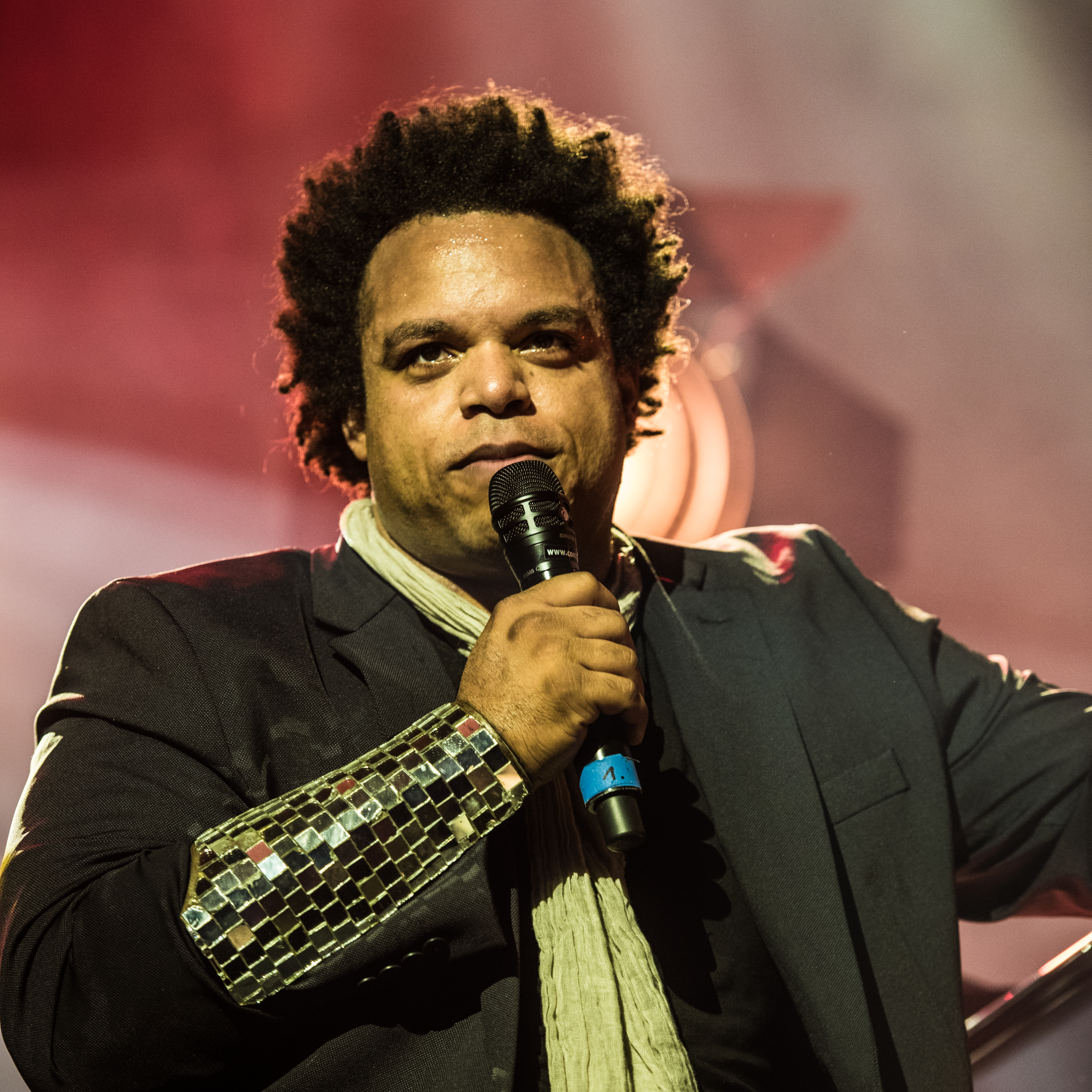
- Lewis at the Moers Festival 2017

Background information
- Also known as: ELEW
- Born: Eric Robert Lewis; May 13, 1973 (age 53); Camden, New Jersey, U.S.
- Genres: Jazz, "Rockjazz"
- Occupation: Pianist
- Instrument: Piano
- Years active: 1995–present
- Label: Ninjazz Entertainment
- Website: elewrockjazz.com

Eric Robert Lewis (born May 13, 1973), popularly known as ELEW, is an American jazz pianist who has found cross-over success playing rock and pop music. He is known for his unconventional and physical playing style, which eschews a piano bench and includes reaching inside the piano lid to pull at the strings directly, as well as the creation that he calls "Rockjazz", a genre that "takes the improvisational aspect of jazz and 'threads it through the eye of the needle of rock.'"

Lewis began his career as a jazz purist, playing as a sideman for jazz artists like Wynton Marsalis, Cassandra Wilson, Elvin Jones, Jon Hendricks, and Roy Hargrove as well as performing as a member of the Lincoln Center Jazz Orchestra. However, he eventually became interested in rock music and embarked on a solo career as a crossover musician, quickly gaining recognition for his instrumental "Rockjazz" piano covers of mainstream rock hits like The Rolling Stones' "Paint It, Black" and The Killers' "Mr. Brightside". He released his first album of instrumental covers, entitled ELEW Rockjazz Vol. 1, on his own label, Ninjazz Entertainment, in March 2010.

His distinctive style has helped him to amass a large following of celebrity fans, including Barack and Michelle Obama (for whom he has played at the White House), Leonardo DiCaprio, Donna Karan, Téa Leoni, David Duchovny, Hugh Jackman, Forest Whitaker, and Gerard Butler. Throughout his career, he has performed with musicians such as Sting, The Roots, Natalie Cole, and Esperanza Spalding. In the spring of 2011, he joined singer-songwriter Josh Groban as the opening act on the American leg of the singer's Straight to You Tour. Around the same time, he appeared as a contestant in an audition on the NBC reality series America's Got Talent, where he received a standing ovation from the crowd and positive scores from all three judges. Despite his positive reception, he ultimately dropped out of the competition in order to tour with Groban.

In August 2012, he was featured on a Mike Stud remix of the Maroon 5 song "One More Night". On August 28, 2012, Lewis released his second solo album: ELEW Rockjazz Vol. 2.

In late 2015, ELEW held a preview concert of his upcoming album And To The Republic with Jeff "Tain" Watts and Reginald Veal at Dizzy's Club Coca-Cola. And To The Republic was released later the following year in November 2016. Since its conception the album has been praised by some of the largest jazz outlets and publications in the world such as NPR's "Jazz Night In America" hosted by Christian McBride, Jazz-Times, Downbeat, and All About Jazz.

In summer 2016, ELEW was awarded The Novus Award at the Headquarters of the United Nations for contributing music and art to the world.

== Early life and career ==
Lewis was born in Camden, New Jersey, in 1973, where he studied piano as a child. He graduated from Overbrook High School in 1991 and then received a Full Merit Scholarship to the Manhattan School of Music, where he graduated on the Deans List in 1995. He then began touring with Wynton Marsalis and Cassandra Wilson.

== Later career and "Rockjazz" ==
Eventually becoming disillusioned with the jazz world after a solo record deal failed to materialize, Lewis struck out on his own to find success. It was around this time that he heard his first rock album, Linkin Park's Meteora, which made a profound impression on his musical sensibilities. Taking the stage name "ELEW", he set about creating a musical style that blended instrumental jazz with his newfound passion for rock and pop, and he named the unique product "Rockjazz". Adjusting his stage presence accordingly, he grew an afro and adopted a distinctive style of dress, wearing armored vambraces over tailored suits. He discarded his piano bench and began to play standing in front of his instrument, reaching inside to grab and the strings and beating on its wooden case like a percussion instrument.

His first taste of mainstream recognition came when he played two songs, a cover of Evanescence's "Going Under" and an original composition, as a featured speaker at the Long Beach TED Conference in 2009. While the videos of these performances on the TED Conference website and YouTube channel began to gain Lewis attention in the online world, including a write-up in The Guardian, his appearance also drew the interest of one TED conference attendee in particular: fashion designer Donna Karan, who immediately asked the pianist to compose an original piece inspired by her fall 2009 collection and play it live on the runway at her next New York City fashion show. White House Social Secretary Desiree Rogers happened to be attending the Donna Karan fashion Show at which Lewis performed, and she invited him to play in the East Room of the White House for the President and the First Lady.

In March 2010, Lewis released his first album as ELEW on the independent label he founded that same year: Ninjazz Entertainment. Entitled ELEW Rockjazz Vol. 1, his debut solo LP features thirteen covers of rock and pop songs by artists such as Coldplay, The Knife, and Radiohead. The music video for his cover of Nirvana's "Smells Like Teen Spirit" was directed by Japanese film-maker Ryuhei Kitamura, the director of such films as Midnight Meat Train, Versus, Godzilla: Final Wars, and Azumi.

In 2011, singer-songwriter Josh Groban saw a video of Lewis playing on YouTube and asked the pianist to be the opening act for the American section of his 2011 Straight to You Tour, consisting of sixty appearances across the United States at arenas including the STAPLES Center and Madison Square Garden.

In the spring of 2011, Lewis participated in the New York Auditions for America's Got Talent, where his rendition of Lynyrd Skynyrd's "Sweet Home Alabama" was greeted with a standing ovation and won acclaim from all three judges, even prompting Piers Morgan to call him "a bit of a genius." However, he was ultimately forced to drop out of the competition as it conflicted with the Straight To You Tour.

In August 2012, ELEW released the follow-up to ELEW Rockjazz Vol. 1, entitled ELEW Rockjazz Vol. 2. The record contains fourteen tracks: twelve covers of popular tracks by artists such as Michael Jackson, The Doors, Empire of the Sun, The Bravery, Foo Fighters and more, as well as two original compositions. Emurg.com gave the album a positive review, stating “ELEW creates something staggering, something magical….“Rockjazz Vol. 2” is one of those things you have to hear to believe.”

Lewis produced and played piano on "IANAHB", the opening track on rapper Lil Wayne's tenth studio album, I Am Not a Human Being II, which was released in March 2013.
