= Hidden Away (song) =

Single by Josh Groban

from the album Illuminations
- Released: September 13, 2010
- Genre: Pop; classical
- Length: 3:54
- Label: Reprise
- Songwriter(s): Josh Groban, Dan Wilson
- Producer(s): Rick Rubin

Josh Groban singles chronology
"Petit Papa Noël" (2008)	"Hidden Away" (2010)	"Voce Existe Em Mim" (2010)

"Hidden Away" is singer-songwriter Josh Groban's first single for his fifth studio album Illuminations.

== Background ==
Josh and Dan Wilson both wrote the single. Josh also states it took three years to make his new album Illuminations. The song was also available for download on Josh's website. The song was available on his website a week before the official release on September 13. Josh also stated "after months of work, I can't wait to finally share this music with all of you."

== Music video ==
The music video for the song was released on November 4, 2010.

== Charts ==
=== Weekly charts ===
Chart (2010–11)	Peak position
U.S. Billboard Adult Contemporary	12
Canadian Pop Songs chart	63

=== Year-end charts ===
Chart (2011)	Position
US Adult Contemporary (Billboard)	38

== Personnel ==
- Vocals – Josh Groban
- Guitar – Mat Sweeney, Smokey Hormel
- Organ – Spooner Oldham
- Piano – Josh Groban
- Writers – Josh Groban, Dan Wilson
- Producer – Rick Rubin

== Release history ==
Region	Date	Format
United States	September 13, 2010	Radio airplay
United States	September 14, 2010	Digital download
