= List of entertainment events held at the Bell Centre =

Bell Centre is the busiest indoor arena in the province of Quebec, it has been a popular venue for many concerts and other musical events. A list of artists whom have performed concerts at the venue are included in the table below, while non-concert entertainment events are also added. Most shows put on by big acts visit the arena unless they require more room than is available in a hockey rink-sized facility; in which case the Olympic Stadium is used, or less frequently, Parc Jean-Drapeau.

== 1996–2010 ==
Entertainment events at Bell Centre
Dates	Artists	Events
1996
April 10	Celine Dion	Falling into You: Around the World
April 11	Celine Dion	Falling into You: Around the World
April 12	Celine Dion	Falling into You: Around the World
June 18	Celine Dion	Falling into You: Around the World
June 19	Celine Dion	Falling into You: Around the World
June 20	Celine Dion	Falling into You: Around the World
August 3	Kiss	Alive/Worldwide Tour
September 4	Gloria Estefan	Evolution World Tour
September 7	Garth Brooks	The Garth Brooks World Tour
September 13	Def Leppard	Slang World Tour
September 27	Ozzy Osbourne	Retirement Sucks Tour
December 17	Celine Dion	Falling into You: Around the World
December 18	Celine Dion	Falling into You: Around the World
December 19	Celine Dion	Falling into You: Around the World
1997
January 3	Backstreet Boys	Live in Concert Tour
March 17	Phil Collins	The Trip into the Light World Tour
March 18	Phil Collins	The Trip into the Light World Tour
March 19	Backstreet Boys	Live in Concert Tour
March 20	Backstreet Boys	Live in Concert Tour
March 21	Backstreet Boys	Live in Concert Tour
March 28	Metallica	Poor Touring Me
May 5	Celine Dion	Falling Into You: Around the World
May 6	Celine Dion	Falling Into You: Around the World
May 11	Celine Dion	Falling Into You: Around the World
May 12	Celine Dion	Falling Into You: Around the World
June 12	Toni Braxton	Secrets Tour
June 28	Rush	Test for Echo Tour
July 4	Aerosmith	Nine Lives Tour
July 5	Tina Turner	Wildest Dreams Tour
July 28	The Who	1996 - 1997 Tour
November 11	Elton John	Big Picture Tour
November 12	Elton John	Big Picture Tour
December 30	Backstreet Boys	Backstreet's Back Tour
December 31	Backstreet Boys	Backstreet's Back Tour
1998
January 1	Backstreet Boys	Backstreet's Back Tour
January 5	Backstreet Boys	Backstreet's Back Tour
January 6	Backstreet Boys	Backstreet's Back Tour
April 19	The Rolling Stones	Bridges to Babylon Tour
April 20	The Rolling Stones	Bridges to Babylon Tour
June 20	Hanson	Albertane Tour
July 10	Spice Girls	Spiceworld Tour
July 26	Tori Amos	Plugged Tour
August 1	The Verve	Urban Hymns Tour
August 10	Shania Twain	Come On Over Tour
August 20	Pearl Jam	Yield Tour
September 30	Janet Jackson	The Velvet Rope Tour
October 2	Garth Brooks	The Garth Brooks World Tour
October 3	Garth Brooks	The Garth Brooks World Tour
October 20	Aerosmith	Nine Lives Tour
November 6	Depeche Mode	The Singles Tour
December 1	Kiss	Psycho Circus World Tour
December 7	Celine Dion	Let's Talk About Love World Tour
December 8	Celine Dion	Let's Talk About Love World Tour
December 11	Celine Dion	Let's Talk About Love World Tour
December 12	Celine Dion	Let's Talk About Love World Tour
December 13	Celine Dion	Let's Talk About Love World Tour
December 17	Celine Dion	Let's Talk About Love World Tour
December 18	Celine Dion	Let's Talk About Love World Tour
1999
March 15	Shania Twain	Come On Over Tour
May 15	Alanis Morissette	Junkie Tour
June 20	Sarah Brightman	One Night in Eden Tour
July 13	Iron Maiden	The Ed Hunter Tour
July 21	Cher	Believe Tour
July 31	Roger Waters	In the Flesh Tour
September 8	Celine Dion	Let's Talk About Love World Tour
September 9	Celine Dion	Let's Talk About Love World Tour
October 23	TLC	FanMail Tour
November 10	Backstreet Boys	Into the Millennium Tour
December 31	Celine Dion	Let's Talk About Love World Tour
2000
March 23	Ricky Martin	Livin' la Vida Loca Tour
March 24	Ricky Martin	Livin' la Vida Loca Tour
April 30	Nine Inch Nails	Fragility Tour
June 10	Tina Turner	Twenty Four Seven Tour
June 22	Kiss	Kiss Farewell Tour
July 3	Diana Ross; The Supremes	Return to Love Tour
August 2	Iron Maiden	Brave New World Tour
August 15	AC/DC	Stiff Upper Lip World Tour
August 19	Red Hot Chili Peppers	Californication Tour
August 23	Britney Spears	Oops!... I Did It Again Tour
September 18	Sarah Brightman	La Luna World Tour
September 28	Tina Turner	Twenty Four Seven Tour
October 4	Pearl Jam	Binaural Tour
October 27	Eminem	Anger Management Tour
November 28	Bon Jovi	Crush Tour
2001
May 3	Elton John; Billy Joel	Face to Face 2001
May 27	U2	Elevation Tour
May 28	U2	Elevation Tour
June 15	Depeche Mode	Exciter Tour
July 19	Bon Jovi	One Wild Night Tour
August 3	Janet Jackson	All for You Tour
August 29	Yes	Magnification Tour
September 17	Backstreet Boys	Black & Blue Tour
October 12	Garbage	Beautiful Garbage World Tour
October 12	U2	Elevation Tour
October 31	Aerosmith	Just Push Play Tour
2002
June 27	Korn	Untouchables Tour
August 12	Bob Dylan	Never Ending Tour 2002
August 16	Oasis	Heathen Chemistry Tour
October 18	Rush	Vapor Trails Tour
October 21	Cher	Living Proof: The Farewell Tour
November 20	Tori Amos	On Scarlet's Walk Tour
November 27	Shakira	Tour of the Mongoose
December 5	Korn	Untouchables Tour
2003
January 8	The Rolling Stones	Licks Tour
February 21	Bon Jovi	Bounce Tour
February 25	Coldplay	A Rush of Blood to the Head Tour
March 14	Scorpions	2003 Tour
April 11	Avril Lavigne	Try to Shut Me Up Tour
April 19	Bruce Springsteen and the E Street Band	The Rising Tour
May 15	Red Hot Chili Peppers	By the Way World Tour
June 29	Pearl Jam	Riot Act Tour
August 2	Iron Maiden	Give Me Ed... 'Til I'm Dead Tour
December 13	David Bowie	A Reality Tour
2004
January 20	Iron Maiden	Dance of Death World Tour
February 2	Sarah Brightman	Harem World Tour
February 12	Nickelback	The Long Road Tour
April 4	Britney Spears	The Onyx Hotel Tour
April 20	Aerosmith	Honkin' on Bobo Tour
May 6	Shania Twain	Up! Tour
August 18	Yes	35th Anniversary Tour
August 21	Rush	R30: 30th Anniversary Tour
October 3	Metallica	Madly in Anger with the World Tour
October 4	Metallica	Madly in Anger with the World Tour
October 25	Sarah Brightman	Harem World Tour
November 4	Green Day	American Idiot World Tour
November 9	Van Halen	Summer Tour
2005
April 7	Cher	Living Proof: The Farewell Tour
August 3	Coldplay	Twisted Logic Tour
August 14	Destiny's Child	Destiny Fulfilled... and Lovin' It
August 26	Tori Amos	Original Sinsuality Tour
September 3	Avril Lavigne	Bonez Tour
September 13	Backstreet Boys	Never Gone Tour
September 15	Pearl Jam	2005 North American and Latin American Tour
October 12	Judas Priest	Retribution Tour
November 11	Nine Inch Nails	Live: With Teeth Tour
November 26	U2	Vertigo Tour
November 28	U2	Vertigo Tour
December 4	Depeche Mode	Touring the Angel
December 11	Gwen Stefani	Harajuku Lovers Tour
December 14	Bon Jovi	Have a Nice Day Tour
December 15	Bon Jovi	Have a Nice Day Tour
2006
January 10	The Rolling Stones	A Bigger Bang Tour
February 17	Nickelback	All the Right Reasons Tour
May 17	Depeche Mode	Touring the Angel
June 21	Madonna	Confessions Tour
June 22	Madonna	Confessions Tour
August 12	Dixie Chicks	Accidents & Accusations Tour
August 15	Mariah Carey	The Adventures of Mimi
September 12	Black Eyed Peas	Monkey Business Tour
September 21	Roger Waters	The Dark Side of the Moon Live
September 27	Megadeth; Lamb of God; Opeth; Arch Enemy; Overkill; Into Eternity; Sanctity; The SmashUp	Gigantour
September 28	Red Hot Chili Peppers	Stadium Arcadium World Tour
October 10	Iron Maiden	A Matter of Life and Death Tour
October 15	Barbra Streisand	Streisand Tour
November 8	Bob Dylan	Never Ending Tour 2006
November 11	Elton John	The Captain and the Kid Tour
December 5	Aerosmith	Route of All Evil Tour
2007
January 31	Justin Timberlake	FutureSex/LoveShow
February 5	Billy Talent	Billy Talent II Tour
March 26	Heaven & Hell	2007 Tour
March 28	Christina Aguilera	Back to Basics Tour
May 1	Ricky Martin	Black and White Tour
May 6	The Killers	Sam's Town Tour
May 9	My Chemical Romance	The Black Parade World Tour
May 29	Gwen Stefani	The Sweet Escape Tour
June 7	Roger Waters	The Dark Side of the Moon Live
July 17	Def Leppard	Downstage Thrust Tour
July 25	The Police	The Police Reunion Tour
July 26	The Police	The Police Reunion Tour
July 28	Deep Purple	Rapture of the Deep tour
August 7	Daft Punk	Alive 2006/2007
August 8	Marilyn Manson	Rape of the World Tour
August 14	Beyoncé	The Beyoncé Experience
August 17	Dream Theater	Chaos in Motion Tour
August 18	Justin Timberlake	FutureSex/LoveShow
September 15	Rush	Snakes & Arrows Tour
September 24	Rihanna	Good Girl Gone Bad Tour
October 12	Jennifer Lopez; Marc Anthony	El Cantante Tour
November 10	Van Halen	2007 - 2008 North American Tour
November 12	The Police	The Police Reunion Tour
November 14	Bon Jovi	Lost Highway Tour
November 15	Bon Jovi	Lost Highway Tour
November 28	Avril Lavigne	The Best Damn Thing Promotional Tour
2008
January 31	Spice Girls	The Return of the Spice Girls
February 22	Linkin Park	Minutes to Midnight World Tour
February 24	Spice Girls	The Return of the Spice Girls
March 2	Bruce Springsteen and the E Street Band	Magic Tour
April 2	Avril Lavigne	The Best Damn World Tour
April 29	Megadeth; In Flames; Children of Bodom; Job for a Cowboy; High on Fire	Gigantour
May 20	Kanye West	Glow in the Dark Tour
June 3	Alicia Keys	As I Am Tour
June 12	Rush	Snakes & Arrows Tour
July 29	Coldplay	Viva la Vida Tour
August 5	Backstreet Boys	Unbreakable Tour
August 12	Judas Priest	Nostradamus World Tour
August 15	Celine Dion	Taking Chances World Tour
August 16	Celine Dion	Taking Chances World Tour
August 19	Celine Dion	Taking Chances World Tour
August 20	Celine Dion	Taking Chances World Tour
August 23	Celine Dion	Taking Chances World Tour
August 25	Celine Dion	Taking Chances World Tour
August 31	Celine Dion	Taking Chances World Tour
September 1	Celine Dion	Taking Chances World Tour
September 5	Oasis	Dig Out Your Soul Tour
September 20	New Kids on the Block	Live Tour
October 22	Madonna	Sticky & Sweet Tour
October 23	Madonna	Sticky & Sweet Tour
October 26	Lenny Kravitz	Love Revolution Tour
November 18	Bob Dylan	Never Ending Tour 2008
November 26	Sarah Brightman	The Symphony World Tour
December 8	Tina Turner	Tina!: 50th Anniversary Tour
December 10	Tina Turner	Tina!: 50th Anniversary Tour
2009
February 12	Celine Dion	Taking Chances World Tour
February 14	Celine Dion	Taking Chances World Tour
February 15	Celine Dion	Taking Chances World Tour
March 20	Britney Spears	Circus Tour
May 5	Britney Spears	Circus Tour
June 3	Elton John; Billy Joel	Face to Face 2009
July 13	Kiss	Alive 35 World Tour
July 18	Green Day	21st Century Breakdown World Tour
July 21	Beyoncé	I Am... World Tour
July 25	Depeche Mode	Tour of the Universe
August 7	Blink-182	Live in Concert
August 12	Dream Theater	Progressive Nation 2009
September 5	The Killers	Day & Age World Tour
September 19	Metallica	World Magnetic Tour
September 20	Metallica	World Magnetic Tour
September 22	Marilyn Manson	The High End of Low Tour
October 1	Kiss	Alive 35 World Tour
October 21	Laura Pausini	World Tour 2009
October 30	Jay-Z	The Blueprint 3 Tour
November 27	Lady Gaga	The Monster Ball Tour
2010
January 27	Guns N' Roses	Chinese Democracy Tour
February 4	Mariah Carey	Angels Advocate Tour
February 17	John Mayer	Battle Studies World Tour
February 28	Alicia Keys	The Freedom Tour
March 10	Muse	The Resistance Tour
March 19	Bon Jovi	The Circle Tour
March 20	Bon Jovi	The Circle Tour
March 24	Billy Talent	Billy Talent III Tour
April 9	Nickelback	Dark Horse Tour
June 26	Scorpions	Get Your Sting and Blackout World Tour
June 28	Lady Gaga	The Monster Ball Tour
July 7	Iron Maiden	The Final Frontier World Tour
July 31	Black Eyed Peas	The E.N.D. World Tour
August 5	Michael Bublé	Crazy Love Tour
August 6	Michael Bublé	Crazy Love Tour
August 7	Rihanna	Last Girl on Earth Tour
August 12	Paul McCartney	Up and Coming Tour
August 16	Backstreet Boys	This Is Us Tour
September 15	Shakira	The Sun Comes Out World Tour
October 3	Gorillaz	Escape to Plastic Beach Tour
October 19	Roger Waters	The Wall Live
October 20	Roger Waters	The Wall Live
November 22	Justin Bieber	My World Tour
November 23	Ozzy Osbourne	Scream World Tour
December 9	Rammstein	Liebe ist für alle da Tour

== 2011–2020 ==
Entertainment events at Bell Centre
Dates	Artists	Tour / Event	Opening Act
2011
February 7	Linkin Park	A Thousand Suns World Tour	
February 17	Enrique Iglesias	Euphoria Tour	Mohombi
February 18	Bon Jovi	Bon Jovi Live	
February 19	Bon Jovi	Bon Jovi Live	
April 1	Rod Stewart	Heart & Soul Tour	
April 12	Ricky Martin	Música + Alma + Sexo World Tour	
April 20	Rush	Time Machine Tour	
April 25	Lady Gaga	The Monster Ball Tour	Semi Precious Weapons
April 28	Kylie Minogue	Aphrodite: Les Folies Tour	DJ Stéphan Grondin
May 4	Bon Jovi	Bon Jovi Live	
May 7	Rammstein	Liebe ist für alle da Tour	
May 30	Kid Rock	Born Free Tour	The Trews
June 7	New Kids on the Block; Backstreet Boys	NKOTBSB Tour	Jordin Sparks; Neverest
June 10	Rihanna	Loud Tour	
June 11	Rihanna	Loud Tour	
July 2	Katy Perry	California Dreams Tour	Marina and the Diamonds; DJ Skeet Skeet
July 14	Taylor Swift	Speak Now World Tour	Needtobreathe; Danny Gokey
July 23	Josh Groban	Straight to You Tour	
July 26	Paul McCartney	On the Run Tour	DJ Chris Holmes
July 27	Paul McCartney	On the Run Tour	DJ Chris Holmes
August 1	Janet Jackson	Number Ones, Up Close and Personal World Tour	
August 5	New Kids on the Block; Backstreet Boys	NKOTBSB Tour	Matthew Morrison
August 11	Britney Spears	Femme Fatale Tour	Nicki Minaj; Jessie and the Toy Boys; Nervo; DJ Pauly D
August 16	Blink-182	20th Anniversary Tour	
August 17	Lil Wayne	I Am Music II Tour	Keri Hilson; Rick Ross; Porcelain Black; Lloyd; Far East Movement
September 7	Pearl Jam	PJ20 Tour	Mudhoney
October 2	Michael Jackson	The Immortal World Tour	
October 3	Michael Jackson	The Immortal World Tour	
October 4	Michael Jackson	The Immortal World Tour	
October 25	Avril Lavigne	The Black Star Tour	
November 22	Jay-Z; Kanye West	Watch the Throne Tour	
December 2	Prince	Welcome 2	
2012
February 3	Megadeth; Motörhead; Volbeat; Lacuna Coil	Gigantour	
March 15	Van Halen	A Different Kind of Truth Tour	
March 20	Michael Jackson	The Immortal World Tour	
March 21	Michael Jackson	The Immortal World Tour	
March 22	Michael Jackson	The Immortal World Tour	
April 21	Nickelback	Here and Now Tour	
May 1	Rammstein	Made in Germany 1995 - 2011	
May 2	Red Hot Chili Peppers	I'm with You World Tour	Sleigh Bells
June 26	Roger Waters	The Wall Live	
July 3	Scorpions	Final Sting World Tour	
July 6	Michael Jackson	The Immortal World Tour	
July 7	Michael Jackson	The Immortal World Tour	
July 11	Iron Maiden	Maiden England World Tour	Alice Cooper
July 14	Jennifer Lopez; Enrique Iglesias	Dance Again World Tour	DJ Toddy Flores
July 15	Jennifer Lopez; Enrique Iglesias	Dance Again World Tour	DJ Toddy Flores
July 26	Coldplay	Mylo Xyloto Tour	Marina; Charli XCX
July 27	Coldplay	Mylo Xyloto Tour	Marina; Charli XCX
August 30	Madonna	The MDNA Tour	Martin Solveig
September 4	Big Time Rush	Big Time Summer Tour	
October 17	Barbra Streisand	Barbra Live	
October 18	Rush	Clockwork Angels Tour	
October 28	The Smashing Pumpkins	Oceania Tour	Morning Parade
November 7	ZZ Top	La Futura Tour	
November 16	Bob Dylan	Never Ending Tour 2012	Mark Knopfler
November 20	The Who	The Who 2012-2013 Tour	
November 26	Justin Bieber	Believe Tour	Carly Rae Jepsen; The Wanted
2013
February 11	Lady Gaga	Born This Way Ball Tour	Madeon; Lady Starlight
February 13	Bon Jovi	Because We Can	
February 14	Bon Jovi	Because We Can	
February 27	Swedish House Mafia	One Last Tour	
March 12	P!nk	The Truth About Love Tour	
March 17	Rihanna	Diamonds World Tour	ASAP Rocky
April 3	Alicia Keys	Set the World on Fire Tour	
April 13	Billy Talent	Dead Silence Tour	
April 23	Muse	The 2nd Law World Tour	Dead Sara
April 24	Muse	The 2nd Law World Tour	Dead Sara
May 1	Rihanna	Diamonds World Tour	ASAP Rocky
June 4	Pitbull; Ke$ha	North American Tour 2013	Jump Smokers!
June 7	New Kids on the Block; 98 Degrees; Boyz II Men	The Package Tour	
June 9	The Rolling Stones	50 & Counting	
July 4	One Direction	Take Me Home Tour	5 Seconds of Summer
July 5	Bruno Mars	Moonshine Jungle Tour	Ellie Goulding
July 6	New Kids on the Block; 98 Degrees; Boyz II Men	The Package Tour	
July 22	Beyonce	The Mrs. Carter Show World Tour	Luke James
July 29	Kiss	Monster World Tour	Shinedown
August 6	Backstreet Boys	20th Anniversary Tour	Baylee Littrell
August 23	Selena Gomez	Stars Dance Tour	Emblem3; Christina Grimmie
September 3	Depeche Mode	Delta Machine Tour	
September 17	Sarah Brightman	Dreamchaser World Tour	
October 3	Nine Inch Nails	Twenty Thirteen Tour	
October 21	Drake	Would You Like a Tour?	
October 26	Josh Groban	All That Echoes World Tour	Judith Hill
November 4	Eagles	History of the Eagles – Live in Concert	
November 8	Bon Jovi	Because We Can	
November 18	Paramore	The Self-Titled Tour	Lights
December 3	P!nk	The Truth About Love Tour	The Hives
December 14	Rod Stewart	Live the Life Tour	
2014
January 24	Jay-Z	Magna Carter World Tour	
February 5	Elton John	The Diving Board Tour	
February 17	Kanye West	The Yeezus Tour	
March 21	Dream Theater	Along for the Ride Tour	
March 29	Miley Cyrus	Bangerz Tour	Icona Pop; Sky Ferreira
April 7	Black Sabbath	Reunion Tour	
April 25	Cher	Dressed to Kill Tour	Cyndi Lauper
May 5	Lana Del Rey	Paradise Tour	
July 2	Lady Gaga	ArtRave: The Artpop Ball	Lady Starlight; Crayon Pop
July 4	Michael Bublé	To Be Loved Tour	Naturally 7
July 5	Michael Bublé	To Be Loved Tour	Naturally 7
July 14	Queen + Adam Lambert	Queen + Adam Lambert Tour 2014–2015	
July 15	Katy Perry	Prismatic World Tour	Capital Cities; Ferras
July 23	Bruno Mars	Moonshine Jungle Tour	Bebe Rexha
July 25	Justin Timberlake	The 20/20 Experience World Tour	DJ Freestyle Steve
July 26	Justin Timberlake	The 20/20 Experience World Tour	DJ Freestyle Steve
July 28	Lionel Richie	All the Hits, All Night Long	CeeLo Green
September 16	Enrique Iglesias	Sex and Love Tour	
October 19	Demi Lovato	Demi World Tour	Christina Perri; MKTO; Becky G
2015
January 19	Sam Smith	In the Lonely Hour Tour	
February 18	Nickelback	No Fixed Address Tour	The Pretty Reckless; Pop Evil; Lifehouse
May 2	Def Leppard	2015 World Tour	
May 21	Prince	Hit and Run Tour	
June 2	Ed Sheeran	x Tour	
June 12	U2	Innocence + Experience Tour	
June 13	U2	Innocence + Experience Tour	
June 16	U2	Innocence + Experience Tour	
June 17	U2	Innocence + Experience Tour	
June 21	Rush	R40 Live Tour	
June 28	Shania Twain	Rock This Country Tour	Wes Mack
June 30	New Kids on the Block	The Main Event	
July 7	Taylor Swift	1989 World Tour	Vance Joy
August 6	Ariana Grande	The Honeymoon Tour	Prince Royce
September 9	Madonna	Rebel Heart Tour	Diplo
September 10	Madonna	Rebel Heart Tour	Diplo
September 19	Scorpions	50th Anniversary Tour	
October 14	Ricky Martin	One World Tour	Wisin
November 24	The Weeknd	The Madness Fall Tour	Travis Scott
2016
January 20	Muse	Drones World Tour	X Ambassadors
January 21	Muse	Drones World Tour	X Ambassadors
February 23	Black Sabbath	The End Tour	Rival Sons
April 1	Iron Maiden	The Book of Souls World Tour	The Raven Age
April 6	Rihanna	Anti World Tour	Travis Scott
April 7	Rihanna	Anti World Tour	Travis Scott
May 16	Justin Bieber	Purpose World Tour	Post Malone; Moxie Raia
May 26	Selena Gomez	Revival Tour	
June 8	Florence and the Machine	How Big, How Blue, How Beautiful Tour	Of Monsters and Men
June 18	Ellie Goulding	Delirium World Tour	
July 13	5 Seconds of Summer	Sounds Live Feels Live World Tour	One Ok Rock; Hey Violet
July 20	Marilyn Manson	The Hell Not Hallelujah Tour	
July 22	Demi Lovato; Nick Jonas	Future Now Tour	Mike Posner
July 31	Celine Dion	Summer Tour 2016	André-Philippe Gagnon
August 1	Celine Dion	Summer Tour 2016	André-Philippe Gagnon
August 4	Celine Dion	Summer Tour 2016	André-Philippe Gagnon
August 5	Celine Dion	Summer Tour 2016	André-Philippe Gagnon
August 8	Celine Dion	Summer Tour 2016	André-Philippe Gagnon
August 9	Celine Dion	Summer Tour 2016	André-Philippe Gagnon
August 12	Celine Dion	Summer Tour 2016	André-Philippe Gagnon
August 13	Celine Dion	Summer Tour 2016	André-Philippe Gagnon
August 16	Celine Dion	Summer Tour 2016	André-Philippe Gagnon
August 17	Celine Dion	Summer Tour 2016	André-Philippe Gagnon
August 20	Blink-182	California Tour	A Day to Remember; All Time Low; DJ Spider
September 2	Kanye West	Saint Pablo Tour	
September 30	Adele	Adele Live 2016	
October 1	Adele	Adele Live 2016	
October 7	Drake; Future	Summer Sixteen Tour	Roy Wood$ dvsn
2017
February 24	Maroon 5	Maroon V Tour	Tinashe; R. City
February 25	Maroon 5	Maroon V Tour	Tinashe; R. City
March 1	Billy Talent	Afraid of Heights Tour	
March 3	Game of Thrones Live Concert Experience		
March 4	Eric Church	Holdin' My Own Tour	
March 6	Ariana Grande	Dangerous Woman Tour	Victoria Monét; Little Mix
March 22	Green Day	Revolution Radio Tour	Against Me!
April 1	John Mayer	The Search for Everything World Tour	
April 15	Dixie Chicks	DCX MMXVI World Tour	Smooth Hound Smith
May 30	The Weeknd	Starboy: Legend of the Fall Tour	Rae Sremmurd; Belly; 6lack
June 1	The Chainsmokers	Memories Do Not Open Tour	Kiiara; Lost Frequencies
June 20	Red Hot Chili Peppers	The Getaway World Tour	Deerhoof; Jack Irons
June 29	Nickelback	Feed the Machine Tour	
June 30	Bob Dylan	Never Ending Tour 2017	
July 5	Pitbull; Enrique Iglesias	Live! Tour 2017	CNCO
July 17	Queen + Adam Lambert	2017 - 2018 Tour	
July 19	Ed Sheeran	÷ Tour	James Blunt
August 8	Coldplay	A Head Full of Dreams Tour	AlunaGeorge; Izzy Bizu
August 9	Coldplay	A Head Full of Dreams Tour	AlunaGeorge; Izzy Bizu
August 14	Shawn Mendes	Illuminate World Tour	Charlie Puth
August 24	Kendrick Lamar	The DAMN. Tour	YG; DRAM
August 29	Bruno Mars	24K Magic World Tour	
August 30	Bruno Mars	24K Magic World Tour	
September 5	Depeche Mode	Global Spirit Tour	Warpaint
September 19	Katy Perry	Witness: The Tour	Noah Cyrus
October 16	Roger Waters	Us + Them Tour	
October 17	Roger Waters	Us + Them Tour	
October 27	Imagine Dragons	Evolve Tour	Grouplove; K.Flay
November 3	Lady Gaga	Joanne World Tour	
November 22	Jay-Z	4:44 Tour	Vic Mensa
2018
March 17	Demi Lovato	Tell Me You Love Me World Tour	DJ Khaled; Kehlani
April 8	Justin Timberlake	Man of the Woods Tour	Francesco Yates
April 9	Justin Timberlake	Man of the Woods Tour	Francesco Yates
May 17	Bon Jovi	This House Is Not for Sale Tour	
May 18	Bon Jovi	This House Is Not for Sale Tour	
June 5	U2	Experience + Innocence Tour	
June 6	U2	Experience + Innocence Tour	
June 8	Luis Miguel	México Por Siempre Tour	
June 19	Sam Smith	The Thrill of It All Tour	
June 26	Shania Twain	Now Tour	Bastian Baker
July 16	Radiohead	A Moon Shaped Pool Tour	Junun
July 17	Radiohead	A Moon Shaped Pool Tour	Junun
August 7	The Smashing Pumpkins	Shiny And Oh So Bright Tour	Metric
August 8	Shakira	El Dorado World Tour	Salva
September 4	Drake; Migos	Aubrey & the Three Migos Tour	Roy Woods
September 5	Drake; Migos	Aubrey & the Three Migos Tour	Roy Woods
October 4	Elton John	Farewell Yellow Brick Road Tour	
October 1	J. Cole	KOD Tour	Kill Edwards, Earthgang, Young Thug
October 9	Gorillaz	The Now Now Tour	The Internet
2019
March 5	Travis Scott	Astroworld: Wish You Were Here Tour	Sheck Wes
April 1	Ariana Grande	Sweetener World Tour	Normani; Social House
May 17	P!nk	Beautiful Trauma World Tour	Julia Michaels; KidCutUp
May 18	P!nk	Beautiful Trauma World Tour	Julia Michaels; KidCutUp
May 22	Twenty One Pilots	Bandito Tour	Bear Hands
May 28	Florence and the Machine	High as Hope Tour	Blood Orange
July 10	Jennifer Lopez	It's My Party Tour	
July 15	Backstreet Boys	DNA World Tour	
August 8	Khalid	Free Spirit World Tour	Clairo
August 20	Shawn Mendes	Shawn Mendes: The Tour	Alessia Cara
August 21	Shawn Mendes	Shawn Mendes: The Tour	Alessia Cara
November 18	Celine Dion	Courage World Tour	
November 19	Celine Dion	Courage World Tour	
November 21	Celine Dion	Courage World Tour	
November 22	Celine Dion	Courage World Tour	
November 27	Jonas Brothers	Happiness Begins Tour	Bebe Rexha; Jordan McGraw
2020
January 3	Jay Du Temple	Tournée Bien Faire	
February 13	Chance the Rapper	The Big Day	
February 18	Celine Dion	Courage World Tour	
February 19	Celine Dion	Courage World Tour	
March 6	The Lumineers	III Tour	

== 2022–present ==
Entertainment events at Bell Centre
Dates	Artists	Tour / Event	Opening Act
2022
July 25	Dua Lipa	Future Nostalgia Tour	Caroline Polachek, Lolo Zouaï
September 2nd	My Chemical Romance	Reunion Tour	Waterparks, Meg Mysrs
October 8	Gorillaz	World Tour 2022	EarthGang
October 26	The Smashing Pumpkins; Jane's Addiction	Spirit of Fire Tour	Poppy
2023
April 12	Depeche Mode	Memento Mori World Tour	Kelly Lee Owens
July 14	Drake	It's All a Blur Tour	21 Savage could not appear for legal reasons, and was substituted by other artists.
July 15	Drake	It's All a Blur Tour	21 Savage could not appear for legal reasons, and was substituted by other artists.
July 21	Avenged Sevenfold	Life Is but a Dream... Tour	Alexisonfire
August 1	50 Cent	The Final Lap Tour	Busta Rhymes, Jeremih
August 2	50 Cent	The Final Lap Tour	Busta Rhymes, Jeremih
September 23	Morgan Wallen	One Night At A Time World Tour	ERNEST and Bailey Zimmerman
November 3	Depeche Mode	Memento Mori World Tour	DIIV
November 29	Mariah Carey	Merry Christmas One and All!	
December 1	Jonas Brothers	Five Albums. One Night. The World Tour	Lawrence
2024
January 18	Madonna	The Celebration Tour	Bob the Drag Queen
January 20	Madonna	The Celebration Tour	Bob the Drag Queen
January 26	Aerosmith	Peace Out: The Farewell Tour	The Black Crowes
March 26	Olivia Rodrigo	Guts World Tour	Chappell Roan
March 27	Olivia Rodrigo	Guts World Tour	Chappell Roan
April 17	Nicki Minaj	Pink Friday 2 World Tour	Monica
October 4	Justin Timberlake	The Forget Tomorrow World Tour	
October 11	Sabrina Carpenter	Short n' Sweet Tour	Amaarae
2025
March 30	Kylie Minogue	Tension Tour	Romy
May 20	Shakira	Las Mujeres Ya No Lloran World Tour	
2026
March 3	Twice	This Is For World Tour	
April 2	Lady Gaga	The Mayhem Ball	
April 3	Lady Gaga	The Mayhem Ball	
June 3	5 Seconds of Summer	Everyone's a Star! World Tour	The Band Camino
July 28	Ariana Grande	The Eternal Sunshine Tour	
July 30	Ariana Grande	The Eternal Sunshine Tour	
July 31	Ariana Grande	The Eternal Sunshine Tour	
October 24	Aya Nakamura	Destinée Tour	
October 25	Aya Nakamura	Destinée Tour	
