= Right Here Right Now Tour =

1993 concert tour by Van Halen

- Tour by Van Halen
- Poster to the concert in Frankfurt, Germany
- Location: Europe; North America
- Start date: April 1, 1993
- End date: August 28, 1993
- Legs: 2
- No. of shows: 60

Van Halen concert chronology
- For Unlawful Carnal Knowledge Tour (1991–1992); Right Here Right Now Tour (1993); Balance Tour (1995)

The Right Here Right Now Tour was a concert tour by American hard rock band Van Halen in support of their live double album and the accompanying video Live: Right Here, Right Now.

== Background ==
Following a European tour in support of the live album's release, the band went out on a summer-long tour in North America. Approximately 31 of its 41 shows were sold out, and was in support of the anti-hunger organization USA Harvest. Groton had the only show not sold out by the end of the tour, as the state at the time had a shaky economy. The Groton show was almost cancelled because of a thunderstorm, but the band continued to perform, despite the danger.

The tour was the shortest ever promotion undertaken by the band, if previous tours that were promoting the same album were combined and the 2007 reunion tour's lack of actual promotion are taken into account. This was possibly since all the other tours were in promotion of albums of new material to advertise. This made for a more varied setlist than any previous tour and was the band's only 'greatest hits' tour until the 2004 and 2007 reunion tours.

== Reception ==
The tour was met with positive reviews, with the Detroit Free Press stating that the concerts were "blessedly devoid of the usual hard rock glitz and gimmickry" while Cleveland Plain Dealer had said that the band consistently delivered one of the most energetic and entertaining rock 'n' roll shows.

Scott Iwasaki, a staff writer from the Deseret News gave the performance in Park City a positive review. He opened his statement, saying that rock 'n' roll was meant to be played live when the band pushed the "arena sound" into heavy metal while performing to an audience of 14,000 that were singing along and full of adrenaline and enthusiasm. He praised the dynamics of the songs, which were noted as magical and energetic, as well as acknowledging the individual solo acts done by the band members. He claimed that Anthony had performed a powerful bass solo, pushing his bass guitar to the limits while the notes rumbled throughout. He also added on Alex Van Halen's drum solo, who he stated had plastered his drum set with neck-breaking speed and precision, with each hit of the snare and roll of the toms shaking the venue, with cheers from the audience when he performed a latin-rhythm interlude to prevent his solo from being drawn out.

== Tour dates ==
List of 1993 concerts
Date	City	Country	Venue
March 30, 1993	Munich	Germany	Olympiahalle
April 1, 1993	Rome	Italy	Palaghiaccio
April 2, 1993	Milan	Italy	Palatrussardi
April 4, 1993	Frankfurt	Germany	Festhalle Frankfurt
April 5, 1993	Nuremberg	Germany	Frankenhalle
April 7, 1993	Hamburg	Germany	Alsterdorfer Sporthalle
April 9, 1993	Stockholm	Sweden	Stockholm Globe Arena
April 10, 1993	Oslo	Norway	Oslo Spektrum
April 11, 1993	Copenhagen	Denmark	Copenhagen Forum
April 13, 1993	Rotterdam	Netherlands	Ahoy Rotterdam
April 14, 1993	Ghent	Belgium	Flanders Expo
April 16, 1993	Zürich	Switzerland	Hallenstadion
April 17, 1993	Stuttgart	Germany	Hanns-Martin-Schleyer-Halle
April 19, 1993	Essen	Germany	Grugahalle
April 21, 1993	Paris	France	Le Zénith
April 25, 1993	Birmingham	England	National Exhibition Centre
April 27, 1993	Sheffield	England	Sheffield Arena
April 29, 1993	London	England	Wembley Arena
June 25, 1993	Clarkston	United States	Pine Knob Music Theatre
June 26, 1993	Clarkston	United States	Pine Knob Music Theatre
June 28, 1993	Cincinnati	United States	Riverbend Music Center
June 29, 1993	Cuyahoga Falls	United States	Blossom Music Center
July 1, 1993	Barrie	Canada	Molson Park
July 3, 1993	Corfu	United States	Darien Lake Performing Arts Center
July 4, 1993	Weedsport	United States	Cayuga County Fair Speedway
July 6, 1993	Middletown	United States	Orange County Fair Speedway
July 7, 1993	Groton	United States	Thames Music Theater
July 9, 1993	Mansfield	United States	Great Woods Performing Arts Center
July 10, 1993	Mansfield	United States	Great Woods Performing Arts Center
July 11, 1993	Wantagh	United States	Jones Beach Theater
July 13, 1993	Wantagh	United States	Jones Beach Theater
July 14, 1993	Wantagh	United States	Jones Beach Theater
July 16, 1993	Burgettstown	United States	Coca-Cola Star Lake Amphitheater
July 17, 1993	Columbia	United States	Merriweather Post Pavilion
July 18, 1993	Columbia	United States	Merriweather Post Pavilion
July 20, 1993	Charlotte	United States	Blockbuster Pavilion
July 21, 1993	Raleigh	United States	Walnut Creek Amphitheatre
July 23, 1993	Atlanta	United States	Coca-Cola Lakewood Amphitheatre
July 24, 1993	Antioch	United States	Starwood Amphitheatre
July 25, 1993	Noblesville	United States	Deer Creek Music Center
July 27, 1993	Bonner Springs	United States	Sandstone Amphitheater
July 28, 1993	Maryland Heights	United States	Riverport Amphitheatre
July 30, 1993	Tinley Park	United States	New World Music Theatre
July 31, 1993	East Troy	United States	Alpine Valley Music Theatre
August 2, 1993	Thornville	United States	Buckeye Lake Music Center
August 5, 1993	Dallas	United States	Coca-Cola Starplex Amphitheatre
August 6, 1993	The Woodlands	United States	Cynthia Woods Mitchell Pavilion
August 7, 1993	The Woodlands	United States	Cynthia Woods Mitchell Pavilion
August 10, 1993	Greenwood Village	United States	Fiddler's Green Amphitheatre
August 12, 1993	Oklahoma City	United States	Oklahoma State Fairgrounds
August 14, 1993	Phoenix	United States	Desert Sky Pavilion
August 16, 1993	Park City	United States	Park West Amphitheater
August 18, 1993	Portland	United States	Portland Meadows
August 20, 1993	Mountain View	United States	Shoreline Amphitheatre
August 21, 1993	Mountain View	United States	Shoreline Amphitheatre
August 22, 1993	Sacramento	United States	Cal Expo Amphitheatre
August 24, 1993	Sacramento	United States	Cal Expo Amphitheatre
August 27, 1993	Costa Mesa	United States	Pacific Amphitheatre
August 28, 1993	Costa Mesa	United States	Pacific Amphitheatre

=== Box office score data ===
List of box office score data with date, city, venue, attendance, gross, references
Date (1993)	City	Venue	Attendance	Gross	Ref(s)
June 25–26	Clarkston, United States	Pine Knob Music Theatre	30,506	$773,370	
July 28	Maryland Heights, United States	Riverport Amphitheatre	19,996	$428,137	
July 30	Tinley Park, United States	World Music Theatre	24,610	$569,075	

== Personnel ==
- Eddie Van Halen – guitar, backing vocals
- Michael Anthony – bass, backing vocals, keyboards
- Alex Van Halen – drums
- Sammy Hagar – lead vocals, guitar

Additional musician

- Alan Fitzgerald – keyboards
