= III Tour =

1998 concert tour by Van Halen

- Tour by Van Halen
- Poster with the German tour dates
- Start date: March 12, 1998
- End date: November 2, 1998
- Legs: 6
- No. of shows: 86

Van Halen concert chronology
- Balance Tour (1995); III Tour (1998); Summer Tour (2004)

The III Tour was a concert tour by American hard rock band Van Halen, in support of their eleventh studio album, Van Halen III. It is the only concert tour to feature vocalist Gary Cherone.

== Background ==
Despite positive critical reviews, the tour underperformed commercially by Van Halen standards, and capped the band's general decline after the early 1990s. It would be their last tour until 2004.

In a change from Sammy Hagar-era tours, Gary Cherone – who had grown up a big fan of the band – was willing to include material from both previous Van Halen vocalists. Due to both differing vocal styles and personal animus between himself and David Lee Roth, Hagar had allowed only a few Roth-era classics into the set lists while he sang for Van Halen. Cherone's voice was deeper than Hagar's, making it more suited to Roth songs, yet he possessed enough vocal range to perform Hagar songs as well. Thus, of the 19 full songs performed on the tour, 10 were from the Roth era, and 4 from the Hagar era, the remaining 5 pertaining to III (since Roth rejoined Van Halen in 2007, no Hagar-era material ever graced the setlists again). "It may have looked odd on paper but it actually worked live," Cherone told KNAC. "I made a concerted effort to do the old Van Halen tunes that Sammy was not doing. I wanted to do the deep cuts… we did songs their fans had not heard in years."

However, dissatisfaction with the new album and the band's troubles in 1996 (arguments over Hagar's sudden departure, followed by a brief reunion with Roth that also ended abruptly) led to the tour's low popularity. Grunge had changed the face of rock music, and Van Halen's fame – which had endured due to their heritage – took a big hit with Hagar's departure.

A 15-date European tour planned for the end of May and June had to be cancelled after four shows only due to Alex Van Halen's injury. The band also cancelled all of their 4 September dates in Brazil and Puerto Rico.

The April 20 show in Sydney, Australia was recorded live for an MTV special, Live from the 10 Spot. It aired on May 1, 1998.

== Tour dates ==
List of 1998 concerts, showing date, city, country and venue
Date	City	Country	Venue
March 12, 1998	Hollywood	United States	Billboard Live
March 18, 1998	Toronto	Canada	Sam the Record Man
April 10, 1998	Wellington	New Zealand	Queens Wharf Events Centre
April 11, 1998	Auckland	New Zealand	North Harbour Stadium
April 14, 1998	Launceston	Australia	Silverdome
April 17, 1998	Melbourne	Australia	Rod Laver Arena
April 18, 1998	Canberra	Australia	AIS Arena
April 20, 1998	Sydney	Australia	Sydney Entertainment Centre
April 23, 1998	Newcastle	Australia	Newcastle Entertainment Centre
April 24, 1998	Brisbane	Australia	Brisbane Entertainment Centre
April 27, 1998	Adelaide	Australia	Adelaide Entertainment Centre
April 29, 1998	Perth	Australia	Perth Entertainment Centre
May 13, 1998	The Woodlands	United States	Cynthia Woods Mitchell Pavilion
May 14, 1998	Dallas	United States	Starplex Amphitheater
May 16, 1998	Rosemont	United States	Rosemont Horizon
May 17, 1998	Cleveland	United States	Gund Arena
May 19, 1998	Auburn Hills	United States	The Palace of Auburn Hills
May 21, 1998	Boston	United States	FleetCenter
May 22, 1998	New York City	United States	Madison Square Garden
May 24, 1998	Philadelphia	United States	CoreStates Spectrum
May 27, 1998	Helsinki	Finland	Helsinki Ice Hall
May 29, 1998	Nuremberg	Germany	Rock Im Park
May 30, 1998	Halle	Germany	Eissporthalle
May 31, 1998	Nürburgring	Germany	Rock Am Ring
June 2, 1998	Berlin	Germany	Huxley's Neue Welt
July 1, 1998	Phoenix	United States	Blockbuster Desert Sky Pavilion
July 3, 1998	Del Mar	United States	Del Mar Fairgrounds
July 4, 1998	San Bernardino	United States	Blockbuster Pavilion
July 5, 1998	Mountain View	United States	Shoreline Amphitheatre
July 7, 1998	Concord	United States	Concord Pavilion
July 8, 1998	Sacramento	United States	ARCO Arena
July 10, 1998	Portland	United States	Rose Garden Arena
July 11, 1998	George	United States	The Gorge Amphitheatre
July 14, 1998	Park City	United States	The Canyons
July 16, 1998	Greenwood Village	United States	Coors Amphitheatre
July 18, 1998	Bonner Springs	United States	Sandstone Amphitheater
July 19, 1998	Maryland Heights	United States	Riverport Amphitheater
July 21, 1998	Cincinnati	United States	Riverbend Music Center
July 22, 1998	Noblesville	United States	Deer Creek Music Center
July 24, 1998	Burgettstown	United States	Starlake Amphitheater
July 25, 1998	Columbus	United States	Polaris Amphitheater
July 26, 1998	Hershey	United States	Star Pavilion at Hersheypark Stadium
July 28, 1998	Scranton	United States	Toyota Pavilion at Montage Mountain
July 30, 1998	Charlotte	United States	Blockbuster Pavilion
July 31, 1998	Atlanta	United States	Coca-Cola Lakewood Amphitheatre
August 2, 1998	Antioch	United States	Starwood Amphitheatre
August 4, 1998	Paso Robles	United States	California Mid-State Fair
August 12, 1998	Boston	United States	Hard Rock Cafe
August 13, 1998	Mansfield	United States	Great Woods Center
August 14, 1998	Mansfield	United States	Great Woods Center
August 15, 1998	Wantagh	United States	Jones Beach Theater
August 16, 1998	Holmdel	United States	PNC Bank Arts Center
August 18, 1998	Raleigh	United States	Hardee's Walnut Creek Amphitheatre
August 19, 1998	Virginia Beach	United States	GTE Amphitheatre
August 21, 1998	Bristow	United States	Nissan Pavilion
August 22, 1998	Atlantic City	United States	Trump Marina
August 23, 1998	Saratoga Springs	United States	Saratoga Performing Arts Center
August 25, 1998	Darien Center	United States	Darien Lake Performing Arts Center
August 26, 1998	Toronto	Canada	Molson Amphitheatre
August 28, 1998	Richmond	United States	Classic Amphitheater
August 29, 1998	Hartford	United States	Meadows Music Theater
August 31, 1998	Syracuse	United States	State Fair Grandstand
September 2, 1998	Grand Rapids	United States	Van Andel Arena
September 3, 1998	Clarkston	United States	Pine Knob Music Theatre
September 5, 1998	East Troy	United States	Alpine Valley Music Theatre
September 15, 1998	North Myrtle Beach	United States	House of Blues
September 16, 1998	Lake Buena Vista	United States	House of Blues
September 17, 1998	Sunrise	United States	Sunrise Musical Theater
October 2, 1998	Las Vegas	United States	The Joint
October 3, 1998	Las Vegas	United States	The Joint
October 13, 1998	Anchorage	United States	Sullivan Sports Arena
October 16, 1998	Honolulu	United States	Neal S. Blaisdell Arena
October 20, 1998	Hiroshima	Japan	Hiroshima Sun Plaza
October 21, 1998	Fukuoka	Japan	Fukuoka Kokusai Center
October 23, 1998	Osaka	Japan	Osaka-jo Hall
October 24, 1998	Nagoya	Japan	Rainbow Hall
October 26, 1998	Kawasaki	Japan	Sangyo Bunka Kaikan
October 28, 1998	Tokyo	Japan	Nippon Budokan
October 29, 1998	Tokyo	Japan	Nippon Budokan
October 30, 1998	Tokyo	Japan	Nippon Budokan
November 2, 1998	Yokohama	Japan	Yokohama Arena

=== Box office score data ===
List of box office score data with date, city, venue, attendance, gross, references
Date (1998)	City	Venue	Attendance	Gross	Ref(s)
May 14	Dallas, United States	Starplex Amphitheatre	13,789	$400,825	
May 21	Boston, United States	FleetCenter	12,073	$363,730	

== Personnel ==
- Eddie Van Halen – guitar, backing vocals
- Michael Anthony – bass, backing vocals, keyboards
- Alex Van Halen – drums
- Gary Cherone – lead vocals

Additional musician

- Alan Fitzgerald – keyboards
