= Footprint (company) =

American biodegradable packaging company

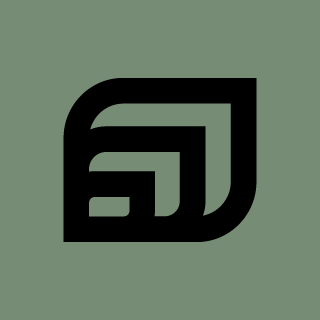
- Founded: 2014; 12 years ago
- Founders: Troy Swope; Yoke Chung
- Headquarters: Gilbert, Arizona, U.S.
- Key people: Troy Swope (CEO)
- Website: www.footprintus.com

Footprint is a materials science organization that engineers fiber-based packaging in an effort to address the environmental crisis of plastic pollution. Its plant-based fiber alternatives to plastic are made from sources like double-lined kraft. These can be compostable, biodegradable, and recyclable. Footprint operates in the United States, Europe and Mexico.

== History ==
Footprint was founded by Troy Swope, a former engineer at Intel, who became an "accidental environmentalist." Swope saw that outgassing was damaging Intel's products and thought that plastic food packaging might have the same issue outgassing on food. Troy and Footprint co-founder Yoke Chung founded Footprint in 2014.

As of 2020, Footprint has factories in the United States and Mexicali, Mexico, with around 1,500 employees. Its main base is in Gilbert, Arizona, which houses a 135,000 square foot complex.

In 2021, Footprint was named a CNBC Disruptor 50 company.

In December 2021, Footprint and Gores Holdings VIII, Inc. announced a merger acquisition that will result in Footprint becoming a publicly listed company. It is expected to list on NASDAQ under the ticker symbol "FOOT." The following September saw its valuation cut as part of an amended merger deal, but with an upsized investment, following delays in its public listing due to macroeconomic environment.

In 2021, Footprint founders Troy Swope and Yoke Chung were named to Newsweek's list of America's Greatest Disruptors: Planet Protectors.

== Activities ==
Footprint's products are made from materials including double-lined kraft and newsprint. The organization uses things like recycled cardboard boxes, agricultural waste and virgin wood fibers to create biodegradable packaging. It owns around 240 patents for containers that can keep food safe, including packaging meant for shelves and those that can be frozen for 180 days. In the wake of plastic straw bans, Footprint makes a compostable paper straw.

=== Research on turtle behavior ===
Footprint supports the research of Christine Figgener, a marine conservation biologist who documents turtle behavior and has investigated the effect of plastics pollution on their natural habitat. Her video showing a turtle with a straw stuck in its snout garnered 37 million views as of September 2019, which raised awareness of the crisis.

=== Transition from plastics to alternatives ===
Footprint has supported Conagra Brands transition from plastic products to fiber bowls. Footprint has developed fiber-based plastic alternatives for Philips, Bose, Target, and Foxconn. Sweetgreen has switched to bowls designed by Footprint.

=== Sports ===
Food service items for the Super Bowl LIV were supplied by Footprint. These included more than 100,000 plates, bowls, cups, hot dog boards, and straws. Coolers designed by Footprint used in the Super Bowl LIV were biodegradable.

In July 2021, Footprint and the Phoenix Suns announced a naming rights partnership for Footprint Center. As part of the partnership, Footprint Center will eliminate single-use plastic from the arena. The deal ended in February 2025, but the company would remain a partner of the Suns, Mercury, and arena. In the meantime, it would temporarily be called PHX arena.

=== NextGen Cup Challenge ===
In 2018, Footprint joined Starbucks, McDonald's, Coca-Cola Company, Yum Brands, Wendy's, and Nestlé in the NextGen Cup Challenge, which sought to identify an optimal cup design that was recyclable. Footprint's entry was called CoolTouch and debuted during Climate Week.

=== European Expansion ===
In Sept. 2021, Footprint announced plans for a European R&D center in the Netherlands that will also serve as the company's European headquarters.
