= Balance Tour =

1995 concert tour by Van Halen

- Tour by Van Halen
- Poster to the concert in Greenwood Village, Colorado, USA
- Location: Asia; Europe; North America
- Start date: January 27, 1995
- End date: November 5, 1995
- Legs: 7
- No. of shows: 135

Van Halen concert chronology
- Right Here Right Now Tour (1993); Balance Tour (1995); III Tour (1998)

The Balance Tour was a concert tour by American hard-rock band Van Halen in support of their tenth studio album Balance.

== Background ==
The tour was dubbed the "Ambulance" Tour by Eddie Van Halen due to his hip injury caused by avascular necrosis, and his brother, drummer Alex Van Halen wearing a neck brace for most of the tour, due to rupturing three vertebrae in his neck. Consequently, Eddie was a lot more static on stage. This would be the group's last tour with Sammy Hagar on vocals until 2004. The opening night in Pensacola, and a combination of footage from the two Toronto shows were broadcast on Pay-Per-View.

The band had not performed any shows as an opening act in over a decade, but on this tour they opened for veteran act Bon Jovi for several sold-out dates at stadiums due to Bon Jovi's huge appeal overseas. Collective Soul, Skid Row, Our Lady Peace, and Brother Cane opened for Van Halen on the North American legs of the tour.

== Reception ==
Joe Ehrbar, a correspondent from the Spokesman Review, gave the performance he attended at The Gorge a positive review. He opened his review, talking about the state of the band with their injuries, suggesting that it be renamed "Van Handicapped", adding that Alex Van Halen didn't seem so enthusiastic about performing that night. After acknowledging the state of the band, he noted that the band gave an amazing performance with youthful energy and a steady stream of their hit songs, with the show getting better and more climactic. While he stated that the band was notorious over the years for delivering sloppy concerts, they had performed impeccably tight that night.

== Tour dates ==
List of 1995 concerts
Date	City	Country	Venue
January 27, 1995	Arnhem	Netherlands	Luxor
January 30, 1995	Milan	Italy	The Factory
January 31, 1995	Milan	Italy	The Factory
March 11, 1995	Pensacola	United States	Pensacola Civic Center
March 12, 1995	Jacksonville	United States	Jacksonville Coliseum
March 14, 1995	St. Petersburg	United States	ThunderDome
March 17, 1995	Miami	United States	Miami Arena
March 20, 1995	Orlando	United States	Orlando Arena
March 22, 1995	New Orleans	United States	Lakefront Arena
March 24, 1995	Dallas	United States	Reunion Arena
March 25, 1995	San Antonio	United States	HemisFair Arena
March 26, 1995	Houston	United States	The Summit
March 28, 1995	El Paso	United States	Special Events Center
March 29, 1995	Albuquerque	United States	Tingley Coliseum
March 31, 1995	Las Vegas	United States	Thomas and Mack Center
April 1, 1995	Phoenix	United States	America West Arena
April 2, 1995	San Diego	United States	San Diego Sports Arena
April 4, 1995	Inglewood	United States	Great Western Forum
April 5, 1995	Inglewood	United States	Great Western Forum
April 14, 1995	Rosemont	United States	Rosemont Horizon
April 15, 1995	Auburn Hills	United States	The Palace of Auburn Hills
April 16, 1995	Auburn Hills	United States	The Palace of Auburn Hills
April 18, 1995	Fort Wayne	United States	Allen County Memorial Coliseum
April 19, 1995	Lexington	United States	Rupp Arena
April 21, 1995	Fairborn	United States	Ervin J. Nutter Center
April 22, 1995	Cleveland	United States	Gund Arena
April 23, 1995	Charleston	United States	Charleston Civic Center
April 25, 1995	East Rutherford	United States	Brendan Byrne Arena
April 26, 1995	Uniondale	United States	Nassau Coliseum
April 28, 1995	Philadelphia	United States	CoreStates Spectrum
April 29, 1995	Worcester	United States	Worcester Centrum
April 30, 1995	Providence	United States	Providence Civic Center
May 2, 1995	Buffalo	United States	Buffalo Memorial Auditorium
May 3, 1995	Rochester	United States	Rochester Community War Memorial
May 5, 1995	Quebec City	Canada	Colisée de Québec
May 6, 1995	Montreal	Canada	Montreal Forum
May 7, 1995	Albany	United States	Knickerbocker Arena
May 13, 1995	Oakland	United States	Oakland Coliseum Arena
May 14, 1995	San Jose	United States	San Jose Arena
May 15, 1995	Sacramento	United States	ARCO Arena
May 24, 1995	Paris	France	Le Zénith
May 26, 1995	Bremen	Germany	Weserstadion^{1}
May 27, 1995	Bremen	Germany	Weserstadion^{1}
May 28, 1995	Nijmegen	Netherlands	Goffertpark^{1}
May 30, 1995	Essen	Germany	Georg-Melches-Stadion^{1}
June 1, 1995	Chemnitz	Germany	Sportforum^{1}
June 3, 1995	Munich	Germany	Olympiastadion (Rock im Park)
June 4, 1995	Nürburg	Germany	Nürburgring (Rock am Ring)
June 6, 1995	Berlin	Germany	Waldbühne^{1}
June 7, 1995	Berlin	Germany	Waldbühne^{1}
June 10, 1995	Basel	Switzerland	St. Jakob Stadium^{1}
June 11, 1995	Zeltweg	Austria	Waldstadion^{1}
June 13, 1995	Barcelona	Spain	Estadi Olímpic de Montjuïc^{1}
June 14, 1995	Madrid	Spain	Palacio de Los Deportes
June 15, 1995	Lisbon	Portugal	Estadio Jose Alvalade^{1}
June 17, 1995	Rotselaar	Belgium	Werchter festival ground
June 18, 1995	Lahr	Germany	Flughafen Lahr^{1}
June 20, 1995	Paris	France	Palais Omnisports de Paris-Bercy^{1}
June 21, 1995	Cardiff	Wales	Arms Park^{1}
June 23, 1995	London	England	Wembley Stadium^{1}
June 24, 1995	London	England	Wembley Stadium^{1}
June 25, 1995	London	England	Wembley Stadium^{1}
June 27, 1995	Newcastle	England	Gateshead International Stadium^{1}
June 28, 1995	Sheffield	England	Don Valley Stadium^{1}
June 30, 1995	Roskilde	Denmark	Darupvej (Roskilde Festival)
July 15, 1995	Holmdel	United States	Garden State Arts Center
July 16, 1995	Holmdel	United States	Garden State Arts Center
July 18, 1995	Cuyahoga Falls	United States	Blossom Music Center
July 19, 1995	Noblesville	United States	Deer Creek Music Center
July 21, 1995	Bonner Springs	United States	Sandstone Amphitheater
July 22, 1995	Maryland Heights	United States	Riverport Amphitheatre
July 23, 1995	Maryland Heights	United States	Riverport Amphitheatre
July 25, 1995	Tupelo	United States	Tupelo Coliseum
July 26, 1995	Antioch	United States	Starwood Amphitheater
July 28, 1995	Tinley Park	United States	New World Music Theatre
July 29, 1995	East Troy	United States	Alpine Valley Music Theater
July 30, 1995	Minneapolis	United States	Target Center
August 1, 1995	Clarkston	United States	Pine Knob Music Theatre
August 2, 1995	Clarkston	United States	Pine Knob Music Theatre
August 4, 1995	Bristow	United States	Nissan Pavilion
August 5, 1995	Camden	United States	Blockbuster-Sony Music Entertainment Centre
August 6, 1995	Old Orchard Beach	United States	The Ballpark
August 8, 1995	Mansfield	United States	Great Woods
August 9, 1995	Mansfield	United States	Great Woods
August 11, 1995	Burgettstown	United States	Coca-Cola Star Lake Amphitheater
August 12, 1995	Columbus	United States	Polaris Amphitheater
August 13, 1995	Cincinnati	United States	Riverbend Music Center
August 14, 1995	Uniondale	United States	Nassau Coliseum
August 15, 1995	Uniondale	United States	Nassau Coliseum
August 18, 1995	Toronto	Canada	Molson Amphitheatre
August 19, 1995	Toronto	Canada	Molson Amphitheatre
August 20, 1995	Ottawa	Canada	Frank Clair Stadium
August 22, 1995	Wantagh	United States	Jones Beach Theater
August 23, 1995	Wantagh	United States	Jones Beach Theater
August 25, 1995	Wantagh	United States	Jones Beach Theater
August 26, 1995	Hartford	United States	Meadows Music Theatre
August 27, 1995	Scranton	United States	Montage Mountain Performing Arts Center
August 29, 1995	Columbia	United States	Merriweather Post Pavilion
August 30, 1995	Richmond	United States	Classic Amphitheatre
September 1, 1995	Raleigh	United States	Walnut Creek Amphitheater
September 2, 1995	Charlotte	United States	Blockbuster Pavilion
September 3, 1995	Atlanta	United States	Coca-Cola Lakewood Amphitheatre
September 11, 1995	Edmonton	Canada	Northlands Coliseum
September 13, 1995	Vancouver	Canada	Pacific Coliseum
September 15, 1995	Portland	United States	Civic Stadium
September 16, 1995	George	United States	The Gorge Amphitheatre
September 17, 1995	Boise	United States	BSU Pavilion
September 19, 1995	Salt Lake City	United States	Delta Center
September 20, 1995	Greenwood Village	United States	Fiddler's Green Amphitheatre
September 22, 1995	Valley Center	United States	Kansas Coliseum
September 23, 1995	Ames	United States	Hilton Coliseum
September 24, 1995	Moline	United States	MARK of the Quad Cities
September 26, 1995	Memphis	United States	Pyramid Arena
September 27, 1995	Birmingham	United States	Jefferson Civic Center
September 29, 1995	The Woodlands	United States	Cynthia Woods Mitchell Pavilion
September 30, 1995	Austin	United States	South Park Meadows
October 1, 1995	Dallas	United States	Coca-Cola Starplex Amphitheatre
October 3, 1995	Oklahoma City	United States	Myriad Convention Center
October 4, 1995	Oklahoma City	United States	Myriad Convention Center
October 6, 1995	Phoenix	United States	Desert Sky Pavilion
October 7, 1995	Devore	United States	Blockbuster Pavilion
October 8, 1995	Fresno	United States	Selland Arena
October 11, 1995	Reno	United States	Lawlor Events Center
October 13, 1995	Sacramento	United States	Cal Expo Amphitheatre
October 14, 1995	Mountain View	United States	Shoreline Amphitheatre
October 15, 1995	Irvine	United States	Irvine Meadows Amphitheatre
October 25, 1995	Tokyo	Japan	Yoyogi National Gymnasium
October 26, 1995	Tokyo	Japan	Yoyogi National Gymnasium
October 27, 1995	Tokyo	Japan	Yoyogi National Gymnasium
October 29, 1995	Fukuoka	Japan	Kokusai Center
October 30, 1995	Osaka	Japan	Osaka Castle Hall
November 1, 1995	Tokyo	Japan	Nippon Budokan
November 2, 1995	Tokyo	Japan	Nippon Budokan
November 4, 1995	Honolulu	United States	Neal S. Blaisdell Center
November 5, 1995	Honolulu	United States	Neal S. Blaisdell Center

- ^Note 1The band opened for Bon Jovi at these shows.

=== Box office score data ===
List of box office score data with date, city, venue, attendance, gross, references
Date (1995)	City	Venue	Attendance	Gross	Ref(s)
March 17	Miami, United States	Arena	11,748	$331,231	
March 24	Dallas, United States	Reunion Arena	15,367	$414,160	
April 22	Cleveland, United States	Gund Arena	16,406	$477,710	
April 25	East Rutherford, United States	Bryne Meadowlands Arena	17,628	$491,780	
April 26	Uniondale, United States	Nassau Veterans Memorial Coliseum	15,323	$444,930	
April 28	Philadelphia, United States	CoreStates Spectrum	15,846	$453,738	
May 6	Montreal, Canada	Forum	12,689	$339,225	
July 21	Bonner Springs, United States	Sandstone Amphitheatre	18,000	$461,651	
July 22–23	Maryland Heights, United States	Riverport Amphitheatre	39,898	$971,866	
July 28	Tinley Park, United States	World Music Theatre	20,543	$609,880	
July 29	East Troy, United States	Alpine Valley Music Theatre	24,572	$722,315	
August 11	Burgettstown, United States	Coca-Cola Star Lake Amphitheatre	23,250	$528,920	
August 18–19	Toronto, Canada	Molson Amphitheatre	30,215	$735,661	
August 20	Ottawa, Canada	Civic Center Arena	14,327	$356,859	
September 11	Edmonton, Canada	Northlands Coliseum	13,987	$376,878	
September 16	George, United States	The Gorge	18,500	$518,350	
September 24	Moline, United States	Mark of the Quad Cities	9,967	$362,346	
September 29	The Woodlands, United States	Cynthia Woods Mitchell Pavilion	13,007	$373,940	

== Personnel ==
- Eddie Van Halen – guitar, backing vocals
- Michael Anthony – bass, backing vocals, keyboards
- Alex Van Halen – drums
- Sammy Hagar – lead vocals, guitar

Additional musician

- Alan Fitzgerald – keyboards
