= Summer Tour 2004 (Van Halen) =

2004 concert tour by Van Halen

Van Halen Tour 2004
- Tour by Van Halen
- Poster to the concert in Chula Vista, California, USA
- Start date: June 11, 2004
- End date: November 19, 2004
- Legs: 4
- No. of shows: 80

Van Halen concert chronology
- III Tour (1998); Van Halen Tour 2004 (2004); North American Tour (2007–2008)

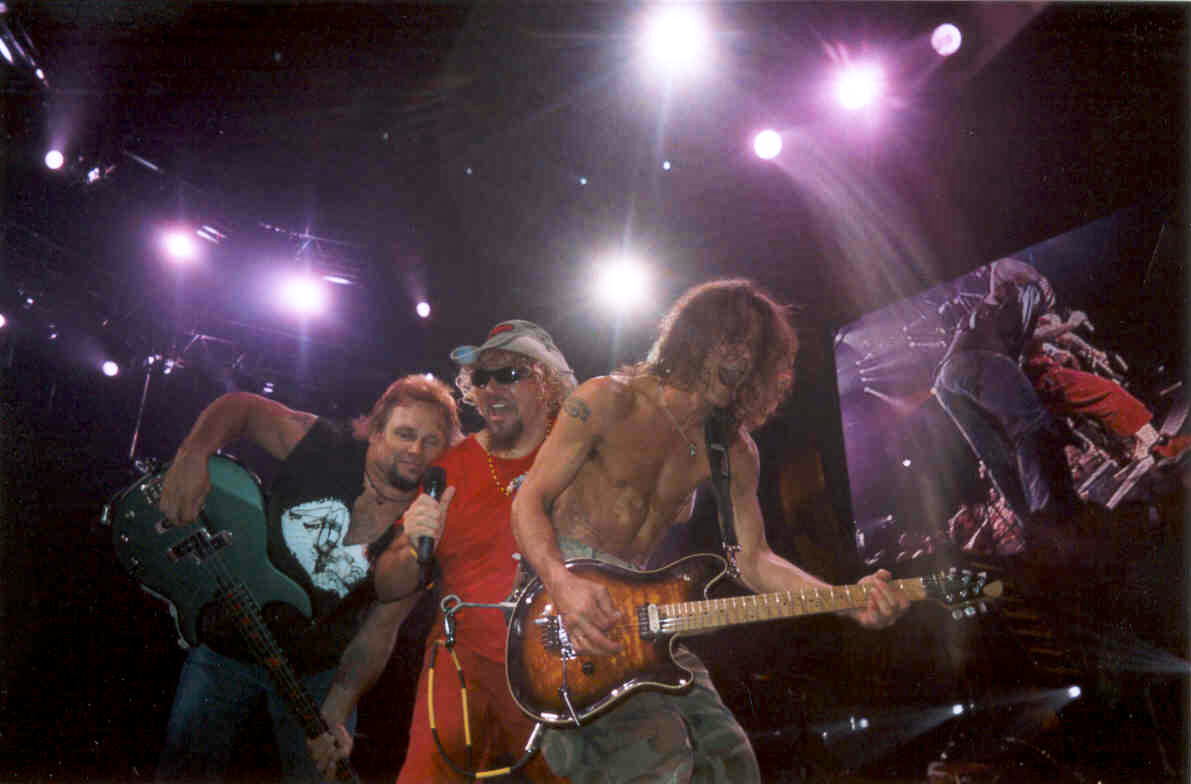
Michael Anthony, Sammy Hagar, and Eddie Van Halen performing during 2004.

The Van Halen Tour 2004 was a North American concert tour by hard rock band Van Halen. It was the band's first tour since 1998 and saw the return of lead singer Sammy Hagar, who left the band in 1996 after tensions with lead guitarist Eddie Van Halen.

Tensions between Hagar and Eddie Van Halen were rekindled during the rehearsals before the tour even started and continued until the last show. The 2004 tour marked the last time that Hagar would ever perform with Van Halen. Some points of contention between the two included Eddie's increased struggles with substance abuse and Sammy Hagar's promotion of his personal Cabo Wabo tequila brand. The tour also signaled the declining relationship of bassist Michael Anthony with Eddie and Alex Van Halen. During the 2004 tour, Anthony was forced to lose his licensing rights to the band and to take a pay cut due to tensions with the Van Halen brothers.

While commercially successful attendance was an issue, the tour generally received poor reviews from critics, with some alleging that Eddie was sloppy, unfocused, and the band was past their prime. The tour's legacy has been similarly poor as well, especially regarding the off-stage developments involving Sammy Hagar and Eddie Van Halen. Nick Deriso of Ultimate Classic Rock called the tour “disastrous."

== Background ==
The 2004 tour was the first time that Van Halen had played together since 1998, with then lead singer Gary Cherone. In 2004, Van Halen reunited with Sammy Hagar, their second lead vocalist from 1985 to 1996, who had split with the band due to tensions with Eddie Van Halen. Hagar claimed that the 1996 split resulted from disagreements over recording new tracks for the movie Twister, after he was exhausted from touring in support of the band's album Balance. According to Hagar, he was then informed that the songs the band had recorded would be released without his vocals and were not going to be used for the Twister soundtrack, but for a greatest-hits album, which Hagar opposed. However, Eddie Van Halen claimed that the tensions with Hagar stemmed from the singer's decision to produce his own “solo best-of set,” which increased tensions when Hagar then refused to partake in the Van Halen greatest hits release. Van Halen turned to David Lee Roth, the band's first lead singer, to replace Hagar as the band's lead singer.

The 2004 reunion tour resulted after Sammy Hagar decided to call drummer Alex Van Halen in 2003 and “hit it off like old times." After Hagar then called lead guitarist Eddie Van Halen, the band was once again reunited.

Originally, the band planned to release a full-length album, titled The Best of Both Worlds, which would have featured the instrumentals from the aborted second album with Gary Cherone, with Hagar on vocals. This plan was abandoned because Eddie Van Halen was only able to complete three of the tracks. They decided to release a new compilation double album featuring three new songs, which was to be followed by a reunion tour. The new songs were "It's About Time", "Up for Breakfast" and "Learning to See". Initially, 28 dates were announced, but the tour was extended to 80 across five months.

Michael Anthony originally thought that the tour would expand to Europe, Japan, and South America, but the idea was abandoned because of Hagar's feud with Eddie Van Halen.

== Controversies ==
Hagar's reunion with the band, and relationship with Eddie Van Halen, began well. In August 2004, Hagar said that he and Eddie were going to “Pretend like it [the feud] never happened. We’re going to rise above it.” In an early review of the tour, Hagar was described as “undeniably delighted to be back together” with Van Halen. However, Hagar and Eddie's feelings of goodwill proved short-lived.

Hagar accused Eddie of drinking too much, despite Eddie's denials: "It was horrible to know a person that was in that kind of shape." In his memoir, Hagar wrote that during the tour Eddie was “unkempt, hunched over, frighteningly skinny” and “drinking wine straight out of a bottle." He was reported to have collapsed during the tour as well, in addition to playing poorly due to his struggles with substance abuse. Eddie said that he was “an alcoholic” and that in 2004 he became a “very angry drunk,” although he claimed that Hagar's memoir was “definitely embellished."

Another point of contention during the tour was Hagar's promotion of his Cabo Wabo tequila brand, to the displeasure of Eddie. Anthony said that “he [Eddie Van Halen] was never happy about that, the whole Cabo Wabo thing.” Anthony claimed that Hagar independently contracted with arenas to sell the tequila, which “would create some tension onstage and offstage." Hagar claims he was told by the Van Halen brothers, before the tour, that he would not be allowed to promote his Cabo Wabo tequila, so he purposefully “got a Cabo Wabo tattoo” on his arm and “wore short sleeves."

The tour also caused controversy with Anthony as well, the band's longtime bassist (performing with them until 2000 when they went on hiatus, but still officially a member in 2004). Anthony was hired as a touring musician rather than a 'real' member of the band, resulting in being paid a reduced commission. Initially, the Van Halen brothers did not want him on the tour at all, but Sammy Hagar refused to tour without him.

The tour also resulted in a legal dispute between Van Halen and the Baltimore Orioles. The Orioles had contracted Van Halen to perform a September 2 concert at Oriole Park at Camden Yards for $1.5 million, in addition to 80 percent of ticket and merchandise revenues. However, the Orioles later canceled this deal, causing Van Halen to file a lawsuit in the U.S. District Court in Los Angeles, suing for at least $2 million. Van Halen argued that they lost potential revenue in the Baltimore area from a non-compete clause and that they had to rearrange the 2004 tour for the show that the Orioles’ reneged on.

== Reception ==
According to Pollstar, the tour grossed $54.3 million, making it the sixth highest-grossing tour of 2004. Pollstar reports that the tour had an average ticket price of $99.12 and sold 1,054,238 tickets over 83 shows. However, according to Billboard Boxscore, the tour grossed nearly $40 million.

Critical reception for the tour was generally negative, with some reviews alleging that the tour was a watered-down version of the band's past versions. Jason Bracelin, of the Houston Press, wrote that “In their prime, the guys in Van Halen were as sticky, sweaty, and accident-prone as the best keggers. Now, they’re hard-rock parental units approaching their fifties, and so are many of their fans." Kyle Munson, of The Des Moines Register, wrote that Van Halen sounded “sloppy” and alleged that Hagar seemed more focused with signing autographs than singing. However, Doug Fox, after a performance in Salt Lake City, wrote that the future of Van Halen “seems to be on firmer ground as well with the return of Hagar."

== Legacy ==
Overall, the tour's long term reputation has been similarly poor, being described as both “Disastrous” by Nick Deriso of Ultimate Classic Rock and “Ill-Fated” by Andy Greene of Rolling Stone. The tour also is notable for its lasting damage on the relationship between lead singer Sammy Hagar and lead guitarist Eddie Van Halen. Sammy Hagar, in his memoir, wrote that after the 2004 tour, his relationship with Eddie Van Halen was “irretrievably broken." By the end of the tour, Anthony and Hagar reportedly used “different jets, different hotels, different limos, different security details" from the Van Halen brothers.

The tour also signaled the declining relationship between bassist Michael Anthony and the band. Allegedly, Alex and Eddie Van Halen did not want to tour with Anthony, while Hagar insisted upon his presence in the band. Anthony ended up being forced to relinquish his Van Halen licensing rights in addition to a pay cut. Anthony claims he accepted the deal because he thought it may have been the last time the band would ever perform together. In 2006, Eddie Van Halen fired Anthony from the band and replaced him with his son, Wolfgang Van Halen.

== Tour dates ==
Date	City	Country	Venue	Support Act(s)
June 11, 2004	Greensboro	United States	Greensboro Coliseum	Silvertide
June 13, 2004	Hershey	United States	Hersheypark Stadium	Silvertide
~~June 14, 2004~~	Richmond	United States	Richmond Coliseum	—N/a
June 14, 2004	Buffalo	United States	HSBC Arena	Silvertide
June 16, 2004	Philadelphia	United States	Wachovia Center	Silvertide
June 17, 2004	Philadelphia	United States	Wachovia Center	Silvertide
June 19, 2004	Worcester	United States	Worcester Centrum	Silvertide
June 20, 2004	Worcester	United States	Worcester Centrum	Silvertide
June 22, 2004	East Rutherford	United States	Continental Airlines Arena	Silvertide
June 23, 2004	East Rutherford	United States	Continental Airlines Arena	Silvertide
June 25, 2004	Washington, D.C.	United States	MCI Center	Silvertide
June 26, 2004	Albany	United States	Pepsi Arena	Silvertide
June 28, 2004	Hartford	United States	Hartford Civic Center	Silvertide
June 29, 2004	Burgettstown	United States	Post-Gazette Pavilion	Silvertide
July 1, 2004	Noblesville	United States	Verizon Wireless Amphitheater	Silvertide
July 2, 2004	Cleveland	United States	Gund Arena	Silvertide
July 3, 2004	Toronto	Canada	Air Canada Centre	Silvertide
July 6, 2004	Louisville	United States	Freedom Hall	Silvertide
July 7, 2004	Columbus	United States	Value City Arena	Silvertide
July 9, 2004	Grand Rapids	United States	Van Andel Arena	Silvertide
July 10, 2004	Detroit	United States	Joe Louis Arena	Silvertide
July 11, 2004	Auburn Hills	United States	The Palace of Auburn Hills	Silvertide
July 19, 2004	Chicago	United States	United Center	Shinedown
July 20, 2004	Chicago	United States	United Center	Shinedown
July 22, 2004	Saint Paul	United States	Xcel Energy Center	Shinedown
July 23, 2004	Ashwaubenon	United States	Resch Center	Shinedown
July 25, 2004	Oklahoma City	United States	Ford Center	Shinedown
July 26, 2004	Kansas City	United States	Kemper Arena	Shinedown
July 28, 2004	St. Louis	United States	Savvis Center	Shinedown
July 29, 2004	St. Louis	United States	Savvis Center	Shinedown
July 31, 2004	Omaha	United States	Qwest Center	Shinedown
August 1, 2004	Denver	United States	Pepsi Center	Shinedown
August 3, 2004	Salt Lake City	United States	Delta Center	Shinedown
August 5, 2004	Phoenix	United States	America West Arena	Shinedown
August 6, 2004	Paradise	United States	Mandalay Bay Events Center	Shinedown
August 7, 2004	Paradise	United States	Mandalay Bay Events Center	Shinedown
August 10, 2004	San Jose	United States	HP Pavilion at San Jose	Shinedown
August 11, 2004	Sacramento	United States	ARCO Arena	Shinedown
August 13, 2004	Oakland	United States	Oakland Arena	Shinedown
August 14, 2004	Fresno	United States	Save Mart Center	Shinedown
August 16, 2004	Anaheim	United States	Arrowhead Pond	Shinedown
August 17, 2004	Chula Vista	United States	Coors Amphitheatre	Shinedown
August 19, 2004	Los Angeles	United States	Staples Center	Shinedown
August 20, 2004	Los Angeles	United States	Staples Center	Shinedown
~~September 2, 2004~~	Baltimore	United States	Oriole Park at Camden Yards	—N/a
September 3, 2004	Atlantic City	United States	Borgata Events Center	Laidlaw
September 5, 2004	Biloxi	United States	Mississippi Coast Coliseum	Laidlaw
September 9, 2004	Tampa	United States	St. Pete Times Forum	Laidlaw
September 11, 2004	Sunrise	United States	Office Depot Center	Laidlaw
~~September 12, 2004~~	Columbia	United States	Colonial Center	—N/a
September 13, 2004	San Juan	Puerto Rico	José Miguel Agrelot Coliseum	Vivanativa
~~September 14, 2004~~	Charlotte	United States	Charlotte Coliseum	—N/a
~~September 15, 2004~~	Greenville	United States	BI-LO Center	—N/a
September 16, 2004	Jacksonville	United States	Veterans Memorial Arena	Shinedown
September 17, 2004	Atlanta	United States	Philips Arena	Laidlaw
September 18, 2004	Cincinnati	United States	U.S. Bank Arena	Laidlaw
September 20, 2004	Moline	United States	MARK of the Quad Cities	Rose Hill Drive
September 21, 2004	Champaign	United States	Assembly Hall	Rose Hill Drive
September 23, 2004	Houston	United States	Toyota Center	Rose Hill Drive
September 24, 2004	North Little Rock	United States	Alltel Arena	Rose Hill Drive
September 25, 2004	Dallas	United States	American Airlines Center	Mrnorth
September 28, 2004	San Antonio	United States	SBC Center	Mrnorth
September 29, 2004	Lubbock	United States	United Spirit Arena	Mrnorth
October 1, 2004	Paradise	United States	Orleans Arena	Mrnorth
October 2, 2004	Albuquerque	United States	Journal Pavilion	Mrnorth
October 19, 2004	Portland	United States	Rose Garden Arena	Rose Hill Drive
October 20, 2004	Spokane	United States	Spokane Arena	Rose Hill Drive
October 22, 2004	Seattle	United States	KeyArena	Rose Hill Drive
October 23, 2004	Vancouver	Canada	Pacific Coliseum	Rose Hill Drive
October 25, 2004	Edmonton	Canada	Rexall Place	Rose Hill Drive
October 26, 2004	Calgary	Canada	Pengrowth Saddledome	Rose Hill Drive
October 28, 2004	Saskatoon	Canada	Credit Union Centre	Rose Hill Drive
October 30, 2004	Winnipeg	Canada	Winnipeg Arena	Rose Hill Drive
October 31, 2004	Fargo	United States	Fargodome	Mrnorth
November 3, 2004	Milwaukee	United States	Bradley Center	Mrnorth
November 4, 2004	Ames	United States	Hilton Coliseum	Mrnorth
November 6, 2004	Valley Center	United States	Kansas Coliseum	Mrnorth
November 9, 2004	Montreal	Canada	Bell Centre	Mrnorth
November 10, 2004	Hamilton	Canada	Copps Coliseum	Mrnorth
November 11, 2004	Fort Wayne	United States	War Memorial Coliseum	Mrnorth
November 13, 2004	Rapid City	United States	Don Barnett Arena	Mrnorth
November 14, 2004	Bozeman	United States	Brick Breeden Fieldhouse	Mrnorth
November 16, 2004	Nampa	United States	Idaho Center	Mrnorth
November 18, 2004	Tucson	United States	AVA Amphitheater	Mrnorth
November 19, 2004	Tucson	United States	AVA Amphitheater	Mrnorth

== Personnel ==
- Sammy Hagar – lead vocals, guitar
- Eddie Van Halen – lead guitar, keyboards, backing vocals
- Michael Anthony – bass guitar, backing vocals
- Alex Van Halen – drums, percussion

Additional musician

- Wolfgang Van Halen – rhythm guitar (during "316")
