= Mortgage Matchup Center =

Multipurpose sports arena in Phoenix, Arizona, U.S.

- The Purple Palace; The Snake Pit
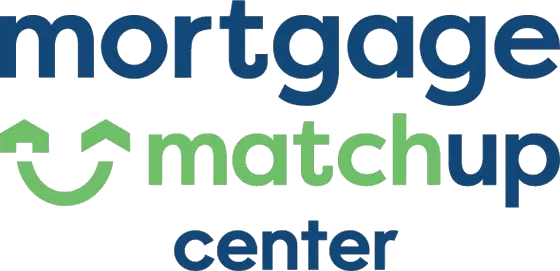

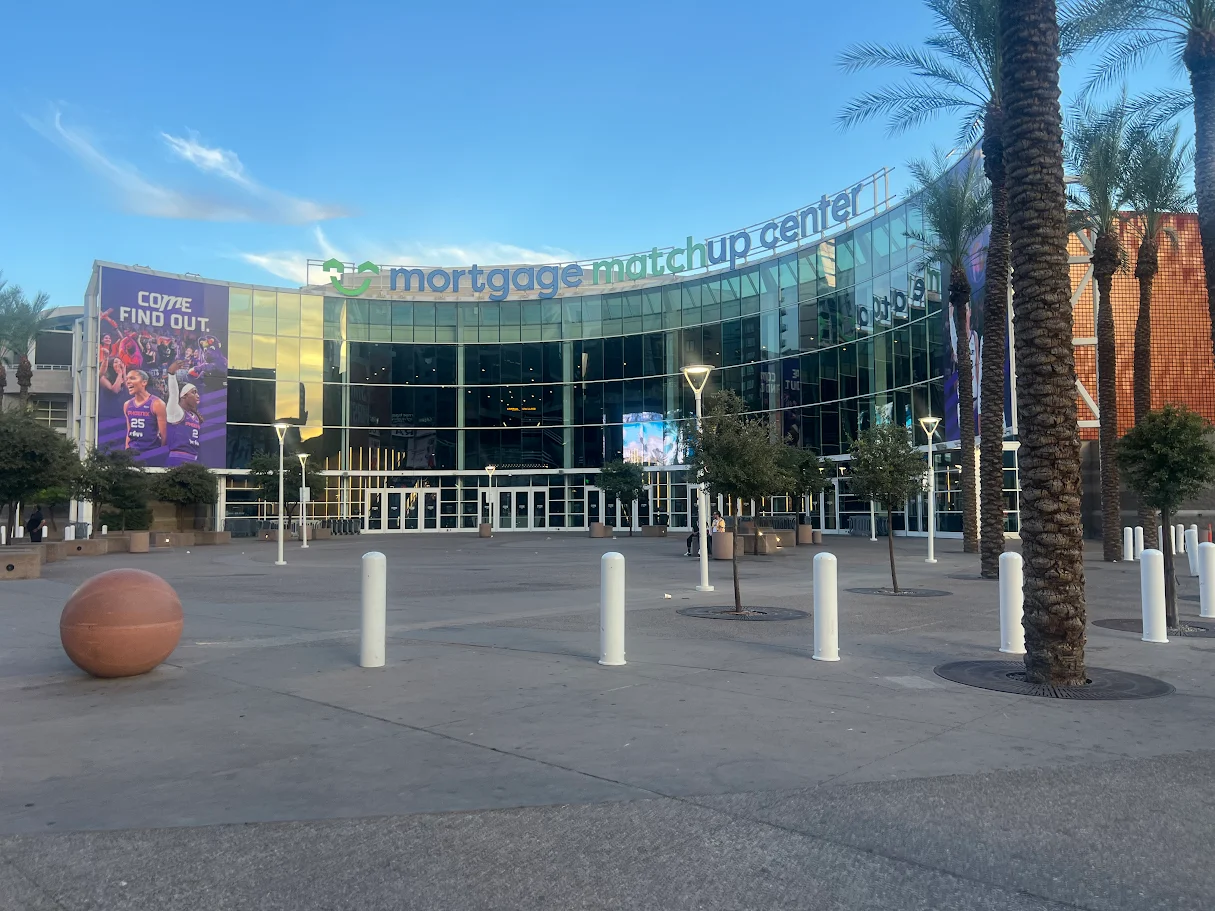
- Mortgage Matchup Center in 2026

- Location within Arizona Location within the United States
- Former names: America West Arena (1992–2006); US Airways Center (2006–2015); Talking Stick Resort Arena (2015–2020); Phoenix Suns Arena (2020–2021); Footprint Center (2021–2025); PHX Arena (2020, 2025)
- Address: 201 East Jefferson Street
- Location: Phoenix, Arizona, U.S.
- Coordinates: 33°26′45″N 112°4′17″W
- Owner: City of Phoenix
- Operator: Phoenix Arena Development, L.P. (Phoenix Suns)
- Capacity: 17,071 (basketball); 16,210 (hockey and indoor football); 17,716 (in the round concerts); 12,565 (end-stage concerts); 4,379 (theater)
- Public transit: 3rd Street/Jefferson (eastbound); 3rd Street/Washington (westbound)

Construction
- Groundbreaking: August 1, 1990
- Opened: June 6, 1992
- Renovated: 2003, 2020
- Cost: US$89 million (US$204 million in 2025 dollars); US$67 million (renovations) (US$104 million in 2025 dollars)
- Architect: Ellerbe Becket
- Project manager: Huber, Hunt & Nichols
- Structural engineer: Horst Berger/Severud
- Services engineer: Flack + Kurtz
- General contractor: Perini Building Company

Tenants
- Phoenix Suns (NBA) 1992–present Arizona Rattlers (AFL/IFL) 1992–2023; Phoenix Mercury (WNBA) 1997–present Arizona Sandsharks (CISL) 1993–1997; Phoenix Coyotes (NHL) 1996–2003; Phoenix Roadrunners (ECHL) 2005–2009

Website
- mortgagematchupcenter.com

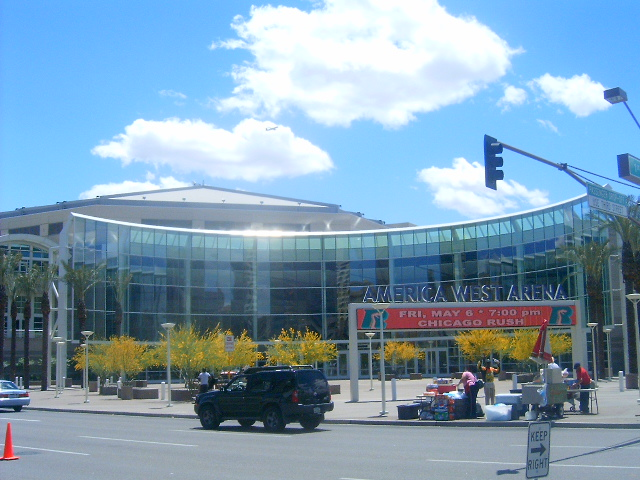
Then-America West Arena in April 2005

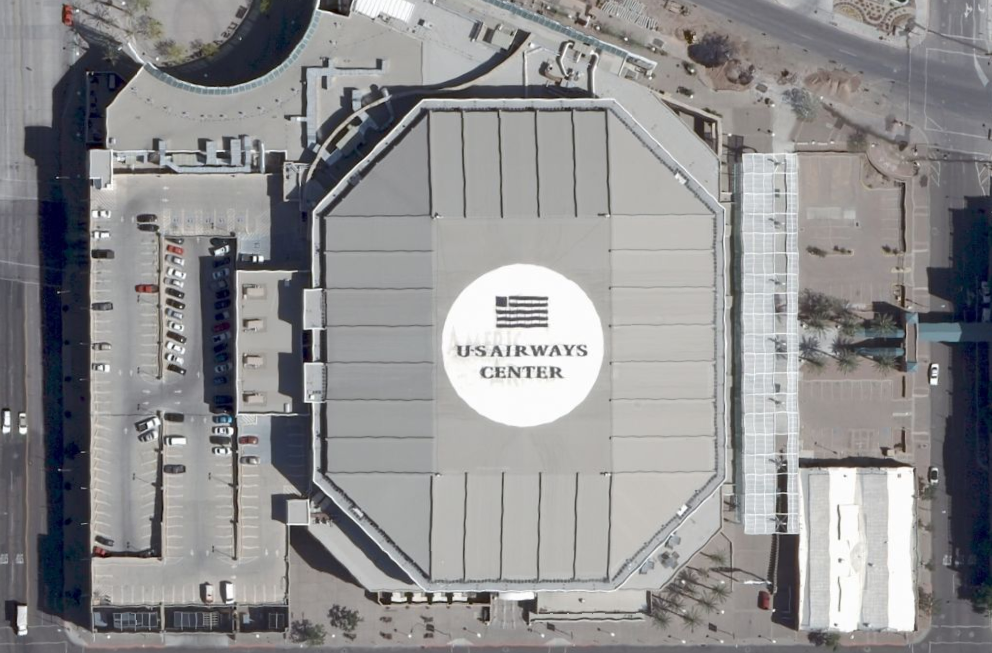
Aerial view of then-US Airways Center in 2007

Mortgage Matchup Center is a multi-purpose arena in Phoenix, Arizona, United States. It opened under the name America West Arena on June 6, 1992, at a cost of $89 million. The arena has also been known as US Airways Center, Talking Stick Resort Arena, Phoenix Suns Arena, Footprint Center, and PHX Arena.

It is the home arena of the Phoenix Suns of the National Basketball Association (NBA), the Phoenix Mercury of the Women's National Basketball Association (WNBA) and the former home of the Indoor Football League's Arizona Rattlers. The ECHL's Phoenix Roadrunners also played there from 2005 until they ceased operations at the conclusion of the 2008–2009 season. Additionally, the National Hockey League (NHL)'s Phoenix Coyotes (Arizona Coyotes) played their first seven seasons at the arena following their arrival in Phoenix on July 1, 1996.

Located one block away from Chase Field, home of the Arizona Diamondbacks, the arena is 1 million square feet (93,000 m^{2}) in size on an 11-acre (4.5 ha) site. These two major league sports venues are joined by State Farm Stadium and Desert Diamond Arena in the neighboring Phoenix suburb of Glendale, the home of the Arizona Cardinals and former home of the Arizona Coyotes.

== Sports teams and events ==
Basketball, arena football, concerts, ice shows and other events such as wrestling are held in the arena.

=== Capacity ===
The arena seats 17,071 for basketball, 16,210 for ice hockey and indoor football, 17,716 for in-the-round concerts, 12,565 for end stage concerts, and 4,379 for theater events.

=== Early years ===
The Coyotes hosted their first regular season home game in Arizona at the arena on October 10, 1996, with a 4–1 win over the San Jose Sharks. They finished the 1996–97 season with a 38–37–7 record to qualify for the Stanley Cup playoffs. That playoff appearance was short-lived, with a Game 7 loss to the Anaheim Ducks in the Western Conference Quarterfinals. Just over seven years later, the team played their last home game within Phoenix city limits with a 5–2 loss to the Minnesota Wild on December 15, 2003.

The arena also hosted the Arizona Sandsharks of the defunct Continental Indoor Soccer League (CISL).

=== Nickname ===
Its most common nickname is "The Purple Palace", though during the Rattlers' season it is known as "The Snake Pit".

=== Basketball ===
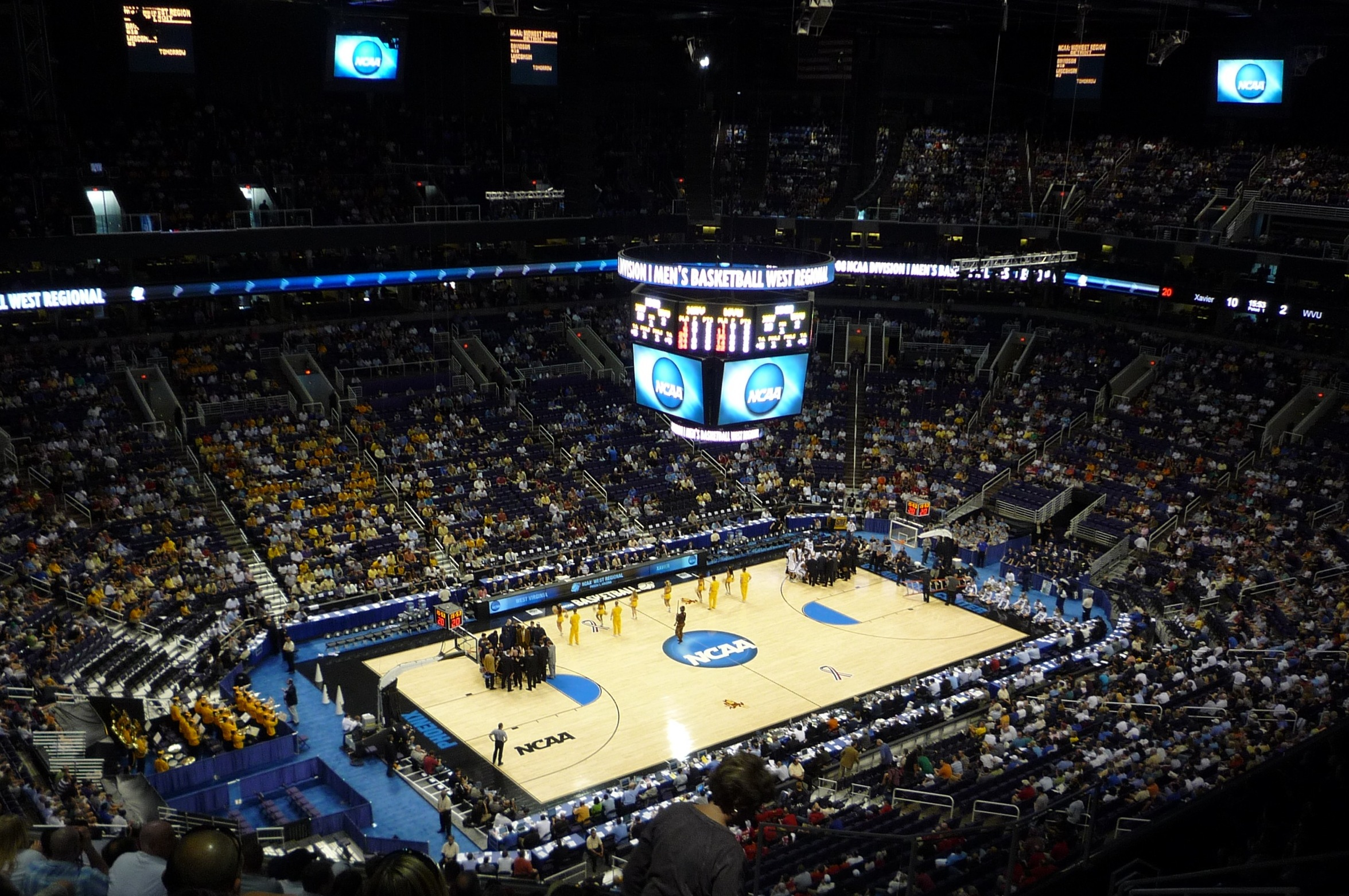
Then-US Airways Center interior in 2008

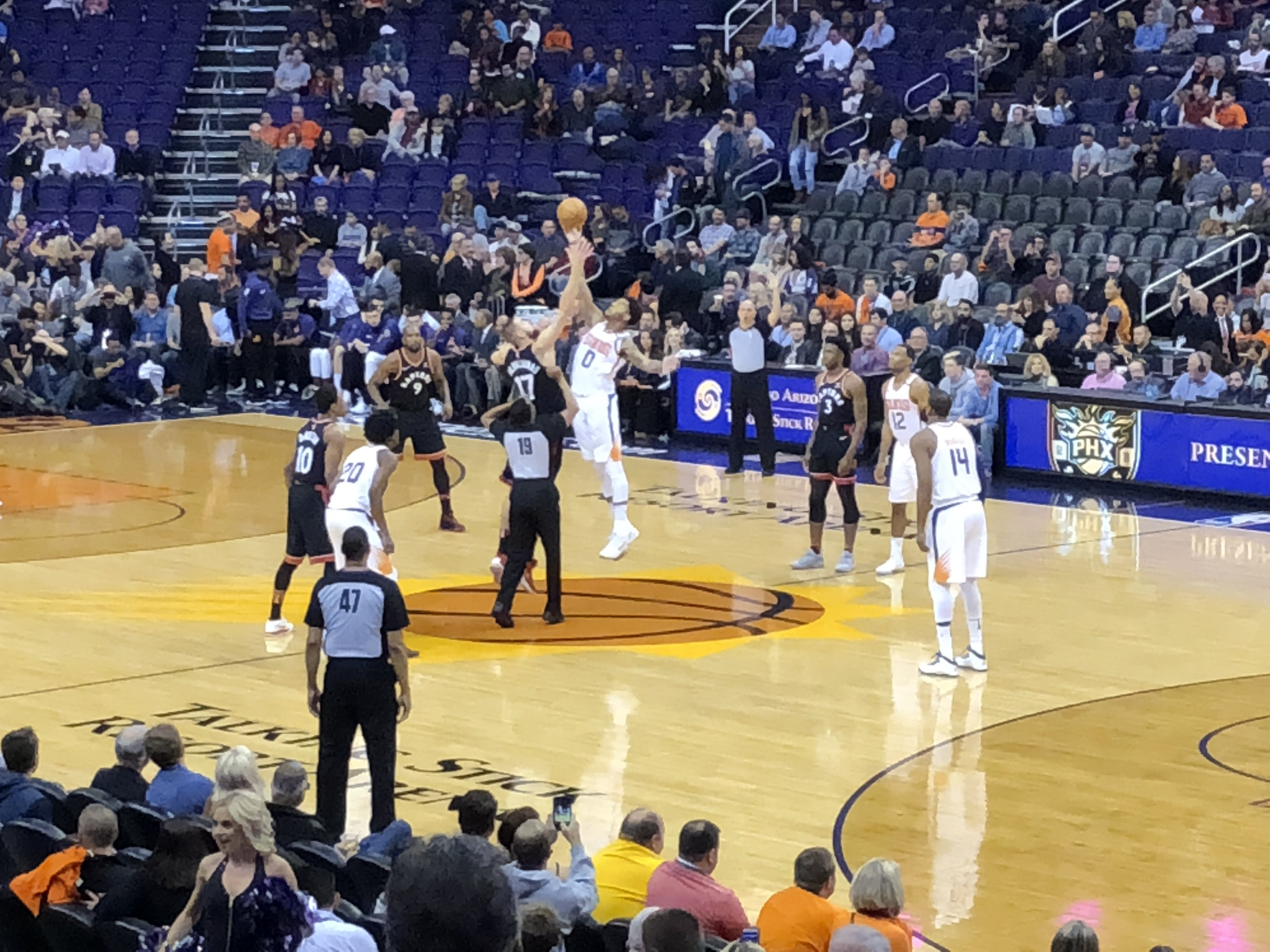
NBA: Toronto Raptors & Phoenix Suns, December 2017

The arena's capacity for basketball games was originally 19,023, but it was reduced after the 2002–03 season to 18,422, then again to 18,055 before the 2014–15 season.

The arena has seen its share of memorable basketball moments. In its inaugural season, it hosted three games of the 1993 NBA Finals between the Suns and the Chicago Bulls; it also hosted three games of the 2021 NBA Finals against the Milwaukee Bucks. The Mercury hosted WNBA Finals games in 1998, 2007, 2009, 2014, 2021, and 2025. It also played host to the 1995, and the 2009 (and will host the 2027) NBA All-Star Games and the 2000 and 2024 WNBA All-Star Game.

On the collegiate level, the arena has hosted the regional finals of the NCAA Division I men's basketball tournament four times (1999, 2004, 2008, and 2012). It also hosted the women's basketball Final Four for the first time in 2026.

=== AFL ===
The Arizona Rattlers have hosted four ArenaBowl games, with three played at the arena. They won ArenaBowl XI with a 55–33 win over the Iowa Barnstormers on August 25, 1997. They lost in their only championship game appearance at Gila River Arena, a 56–42 ArenaBowl XXIX loss to the Philadelphia Soul on August 26, 2016.

=== Boxing ===
Among the notable boxing events held in Phoenix, they include Oscar De La Hoya's early bouts, Michael Carbajal's WBO world Junior Flyweight title against Josue Camacho in 1994 and Julio César Chávez ended his career with a fight at the arena.

Jaime Munguía vs. John Ryder took place at the arena on January 27, 2024; Munguía won the bout by knockout in nine rounds.

=== Bull riding ===
In bull riding, the Professional Bull Riders hosted a Built Ford Tough Series (formerly the Bud Light Cup) at the arena between 1999 and 2002. The annual event moved to Glendale in 2004 before it returned to downtown Phoenix in March 2014.

=== Mixed martial arts ===
In MMA, the arena has hosted several noteworthy UFC events including UFC on Fox: dos Santos vs. Miocic, UFC Fight Night: Rodríguez vs. Penn, UFC on ESPN: Ngannou vs. Velasquez and UFC 274: Oliveira vs. Gaethje.

=== Professional wrestling ===
The arena has also hosted various professional wrestling events, including:

- SummerSlam 2003
- Judgment Day 2006
- Cyber Sunday 2008
- WWE SmackDown, August 28, 2009
- WWE Raw, March 29, 2010 (Raw after WrestleMania XXVI)
- Money in the Bank 2012
- Royal Rumble 2013
- WWE Raw, June 20, 2016
- Elimination Chamber 2017
- WWE Raw, February 19, 2018
- WWE SmackDown, February 20, 2018
- NXT TakeOver: Phoenix and the following Raw and SmackDown events as part of that year's Royal Rumble weekend
- WWE Raw, September 30, 2019 (served as the season premiere of Raw, with a new logo, new commentary team (Vic Joseph, Jerry Lawler, Dio Maddin), new theme song ("Legendary" by Skillet), and a new stage design)
- WWE SmackDown, August 20, 2021 (first WWE event the arena hosted since the COVID-19 pandemic, and final SmackDown before that year's SummerSlam took place the next day)
- WWE SmackDown, July 1, 2022 (final SmackDown before that year's Money in the Bank took place the next day)
- AEW Dynamite live broadcast and Rampage taping, February 22, 2023
- WWE Raw, March 27, 2023 (final Raw before WrestleMania 39)
- WWE SmackDown, January 3, 2025 (first SmackDown to last three hours)
- WWE Raw, June 9, 2025 (first Raw after Money in the Bank)
- WWE SmackDown, March 13, 2026
- Full Gear 2026 (making the first PPV in AEW outside WWE)

=== Concerts and other events ===
Frank Sinatra gave one of his last concerts on December 10, 1993, in the arena.

As part of their Keep the Faith Tour, Bon Jovi performed in the arena on March 11, 1993.

Van Halen made a stop in Phoenix on April 1, 1995, as part of their Balance Tour.

Gloria Estefan played here on July 30, 1996, during her "Evolution" World Tour.

American jam band Phish performed at the arena on December 2, 1996, towards the end of their 1996 Fall Tour.

Irish rock band U2 has performed in the arena multiple times, including two stops during their 2001 Elevation Tour on March 28 and November 23 of that year. In 2015, they visited the arena again for two dates of their Innocence + Experience Tour on May 22 and 23.

Shakira performed at the arena on January 31, 2003, during the Tour of the Mongoose. She later brought her Oral Fixation Tour to the arena on August 11, 2006. She returned to the arena on August 26, 2018, for her El Dorado World Tour and June 22 and 23, 2025, for her Las Mujeres Ya No Lloran World Tour.

Depeche Mode performed during 3 separate tours at the arena. They were on December 14, 1998 (Singles Tour), August 10, 2001 (Exciter Tour), and August 23, 2009 (Tour of the Universe). Their 2009 show had 7,635 people in attendance and was recorded for the band's live albums project Recording the Universe.

Between 2004 and 2013, Beyoncé performed numerous times at the arena. She first appeared on April 15, 2004, alongside Alicia Keys and Missy Elliott during their joint Verizon Ladies First Tour. She then returned as a member of Destiny's Child on August 27, 2005, as part of their final tour, 'Destiny Fulfilled... and Lovin' It'. On August 24, 2007, she performed there for the first time as a solo artist during her world tour 'The Beyoncé Experience'. She returned on July 7, 2009, as part of her I Am... Tour. Finally, she performed there one last time on December 7, 2013, delivering a sold-out show during her triumphant tour 'The Mrs. Carter Show World Tour'. Following this, all her concerts in Arizona would take place at State Farm Stadium in Glendale.

Miley Cyrus performed at the arena for her Bangerz Tour on February 27, 2014.

Lady Gaga performed at the arena for her artRAVE: The ARTPOP Ball on July 30, 2014.

On July 5, 2016, Selena Gomez performed at the arena as a part of her Revival Tour.

Twenty One Pilots made their debut at the arena for the Emotional Roadshow World Tour on July 26, 2016.

Ariana Grande performed at the arena on April 6, 2015, as part of the Honeymoon Tour. She kicked off her Dangerous Woman Tour at the arena on February 3, 2017. She later brought her Sweetener World Tour to the arena on May 14 and December 12, 2019.

Fleetwood Mac performed at the arena on November 28, 2018, during their An Evening with Fleetwood Mac tour. It took place in the hometown of their lead singer Stevie Nicks.

Earlier that month, on November 9, 2018, Twenty One Pilots performed at the arena for a second time as part of The Bandito Tour. They returned to the arena for The Icy Tour on September 16, 2022, and then came back for The Clancy World Tour on August 30, 2024.

On August 30, 2021, Guns N' Roses held a show as a part of their 2020 Tour.

On October 17, 2021, J.Cole performed at the arena for the Off-Season Tour.

On February 8, 2022, Tyler, the Creator performed at the arena for his first show on the Call Me If You Get Lost Tour.

On February 19, 2022, Andrea Bocelli performed at the arena for his United States Tour.

On March 1, 2022, doo-wop band Twin Temple, Danish metal band Volbeat, and Swedish rock band Ghost performed at the arena on the final leg of their US Tour.

On March 20, 2022, Dua Lipa performed a sold-out show as part of her Future Nostalgia Tour, with Megan Thee Stallion and Caroline Polachek as her opening acts.

On September 10, 2022, Kendrick Lamar performed at the arena for the Big Steppers Tour with Baby Keem and Tanna Leone as opening acts on the show.

On September 21, 2022, Michael Bublé performed at the arena for his Higher Tour.

On December 4, 2022, Trans-Siberian Orchestra performed two shows at the arena for their 2022 Winter Tour.

The Footprint Center acted as the venue for Opening Night activities for Super Bowl LVII on February 6, 2023.

On November 8, 2023, Doja Cat brought her The Scarlet Tour to the arena, with Doechii as the opening act. She will perform at the arena again on October 29, 2026 for the Tour Ma Vie World Tour.

On February 24, 2024, Olivia Rodrigo performed at the arena as part of her Guts World Tour with Chappell Roan as the opening act.

On March 10, 2024, Kanye West and Ty Dolla Sign performed at the arena as a listening party for their collaborative album Vultures 1.

On March 13, 2024, Nicki Minaj performed at the arena for her Pink Friday 2 Tour.

On June 19, 2024, Megan Thee Stallion returned to the arena for her Hot Girl Summer Tour.

On June 25, 2024, Melanie Martinez performed at the arena in support of The Trilogy Tour. She returned to the arena for her Hades: The Sacrifice Tour on August 12, 2026.

On July 25, 2024, South Korean boy band Ateez performed at the arena as part of the North American leg of their 2024 Towards the Light: Will to Power tour.

On July 30, 2024, Janet Jackson performed at the arena as part of her Together Again tour.

On October 29, 2024, Jeff Lynne's ELO performed at the venue for their Over and Out tour.

On November 13, 2024, Sabrina Carpenter performed at the arena as part of her Short n' Sweet Tour.

On April 19, 2025, Kylie Minogue performed there as part of her Tension Tour.

On July 12, 2025, Katy Perry brought The Lifetimes Tour to the arena.

On August 27, 2025, Kali Uchis brought her Sincerely Tour to the arena.

On November 4 and 5, 2025, Tate McRae brought her Miss Possessive Tour to the arena.

On November 18 and 19, 2025, Billie Eilish returned to Phoenix to perform at the arena for her Hit Me Hard and Soft: The Tour.

On March 1, 2026, Cardi B performed at the arena for her Little Miss Drama Tour.

On June 5, 2026, Alex Warren brought his Finding Family on the Road tour to the arena.

On June 14, 2026, Louis Tomlinson performed at the arena for his How Did We Get Here? World Tour.

A$AP Rocky brought his Don't Be Dumb Tour to the arena on June 23, 2026.

Joji brought his Solaris Tour to the arena on July 10, 2026.

On August 17, 2026, Benson Boone performed at the arena for his Wanted Man Tour.

Tame Impala will perform at the arena for the Deadbeat Tour on September 14, 2026.

Le Sserafim performed at the arena for the Pureflow Tour on September 25, 2026

Kacey Musgraves will bring her Middle of Nowhere Tour to the arena on October 17, 2026.

On October 20, 2026, Weezer will perform at the arena for The Gathering Tour.

English virtual band Gorillaz will bring The Mountain Tour to the arena on October 23, 2026.

American singer Teddy Swims will make his debut at the arena for The Ugly Tour on November 16, 2026.

On November 24, 2026, Katseye will perform at the arena for The Wildworld Tour.

The Neighbourhood will perform at the arena for the Wourld Tour on November 30, 2026.

On May 20, 2027, Niall Horan will bring his Dinner Party Live on Tour to the arena.

== History ==
Former logo as Footprint Center.

Construction began on August 1, 1990, as former Suns owner Jerry Colangelo envisioned a need for a new arena to be built in Phoenix to replace Arizona Veterans Memorial Coliseum. About 27 months later, America West Arena was officially inaugurated with the Suns' 1992–1993 season opening 111–105 victory over the Los Angeles Clippers on November 7, 1992. Simultaneously, it also was Charles Barkley's first regular season game as a Sun. Despite the fact that the Suns had lost the 1993 NBA Finals to the Chicago Bulls, a parade was still held and attracted more than 300,000 Suns fans. It made its way through downtown Phoenix and finished at the new arena.

=== NHL years ===
When the original Winnipeg Jets publicly announced their intention to relocate to Phoenix for the 1996–97 NHL season, the arena was quickly reconfigured to accommodate ice hockey. Unlike most multipurpose arenas, it was not designed with an ice hockey rink in mind. Its tight seating configuration is suited for basketball, but made it logistically difficult to fit a standard NHL rink onto the floor. The lower level had to be sheared in half to fit the rink and create retractable seating.

As it turned out, the result was completely inadequate for the Coyotes. Three entire sections at one end of the ice hung over the boards. Fans sitting in those sections could not see roughly one-fourth of the ice (including one of the nets) except on the video boards. The problem was so serious that after the team's first season in Phoenix, the team had to curtain off some seats in the areas where the view was particularly obstructed, reducing the arena's listed capacity to 16,210.

The arena added a second video board for an area of particularly obstructed views, and proposed numerous plans to improve sight lines and boost the seating capacity above 17,000, though these did not come to fruition. The Coyotes were forced to sell many obstructed-view tickets at a reduced price. Additionally, an unfavorable lease caused further financial troubles that impacted the team for much of the time it played at the arena. The Coyotes moved into Glendale Arena midway through the 2003–04 NHL season.

=== Renovations ===
The arena underwent its second significant renovation in its history. The Phoenix City Council approved the plan on January 23, 2019, involving the arena, with the Phoenix Suns paying up to $80 million alongside any overrun costs. The first renovation, completed in March 2003, had a 16,000-square-foot (1,500 m^{2}) air-conditioned glass-enclosed atrium built on the northwest side of the arena. That $67 million project was constructed to keep patrons cool while waiting in line for tickets or spending time inside the building before events. The arena upgrades have been done as part of the Suns' plan to keep it economically competitive after Desert Diamond Arena opened. Former Suns owner Jerry Colangelo originally thought of the renovations after visiting Staples Center in Los Angeles and envisioned a similar entertainment district in Phoenix.

=== COVID-19 pandemic ===
The COVID-19 pandemic in Arizona forced a pause to the Suns' 2019–20 season and allowed for an early start to the most recent renovations. Up to 80% of all planned work was completed in time for the 2020 preseason home opener, a 112–107 loss to the Los Angeles Lakers on December 16, 2020. The Mercury originally planned to play their 2020 WNBA season home games at Arizona Veterans Memorial Coliseum, but relocated all of the season's games to the IMG Academy in Bradenton, Florida. The Rattlers had their 2020 IFL season cancelled, but played their first home game of the 2021 season on June 12, 2021, against the Tucson Sugar Skulls. The arena renovations would be fully completed by the end of the Suns' 2021 NBA Finals run.

== Naming rights ==
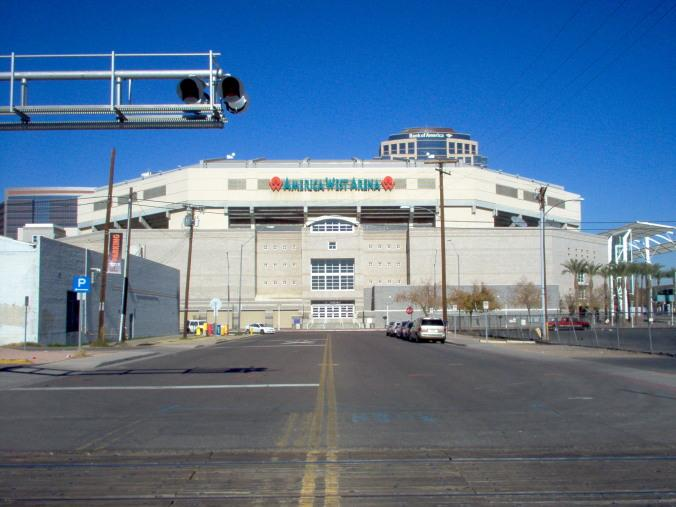
The arena when it was known as the America West Arena

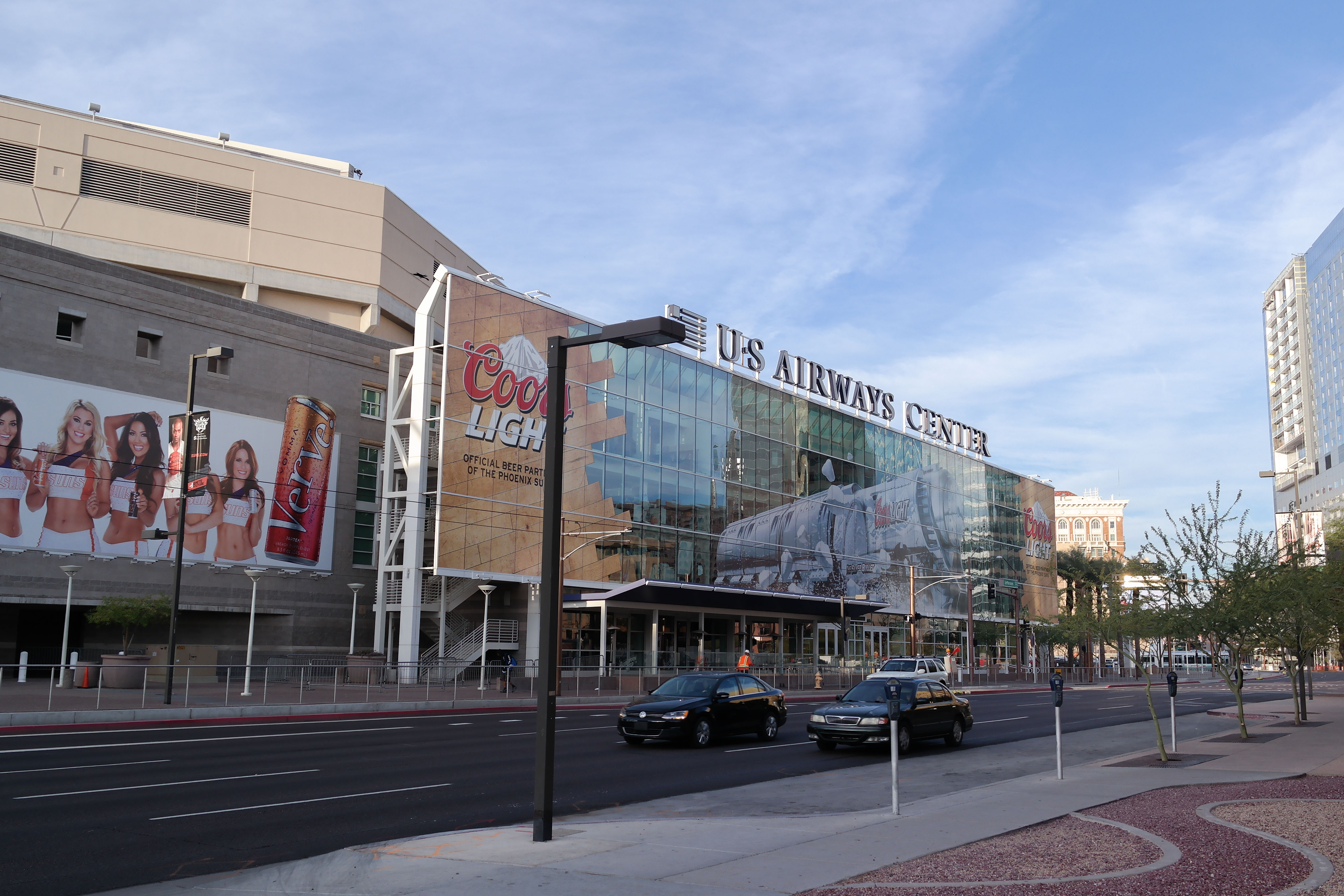
The arena when it was known as the U.S. Airways Center

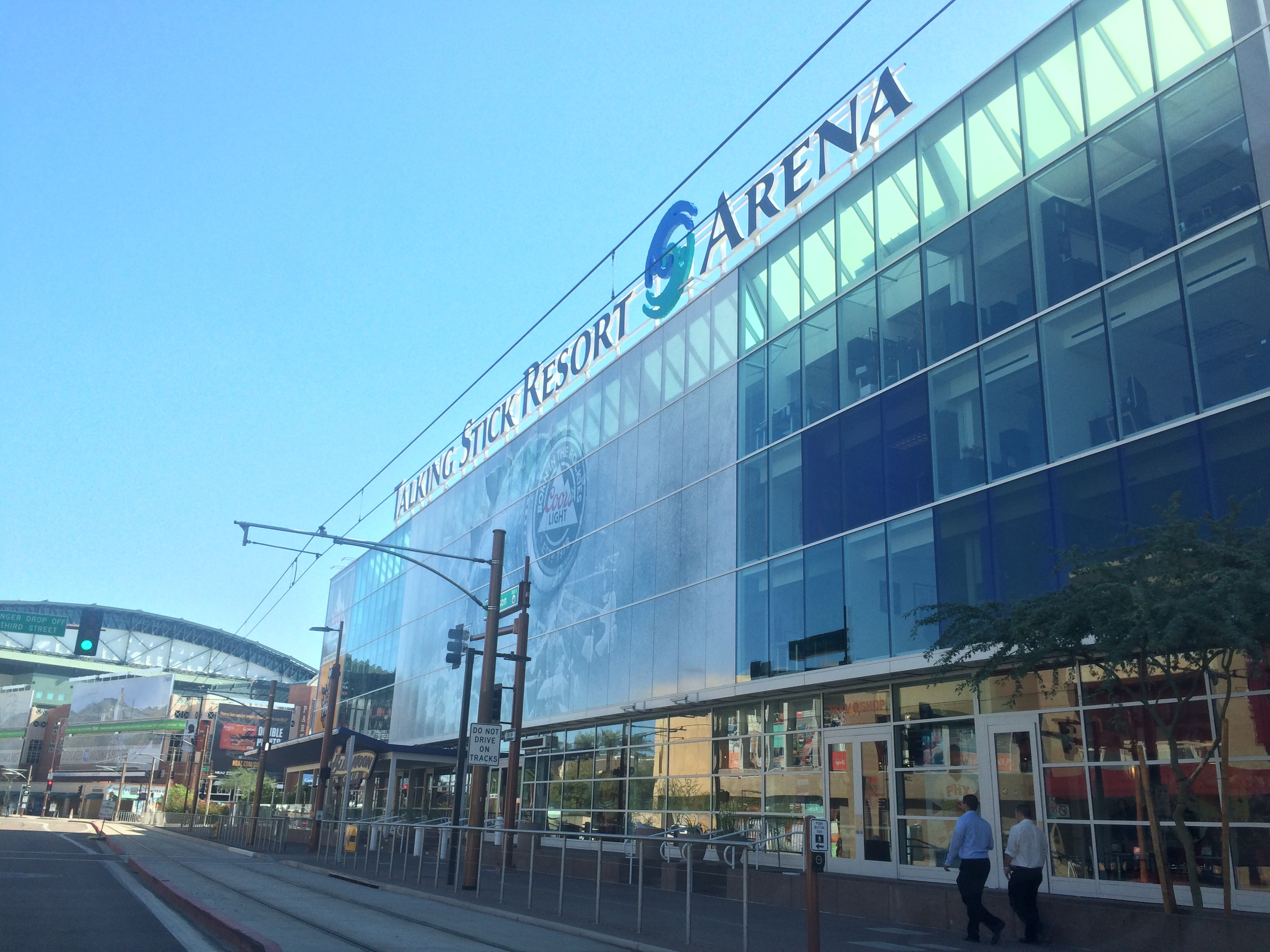
The arena when it was known as the Talking Stick Resort Arena

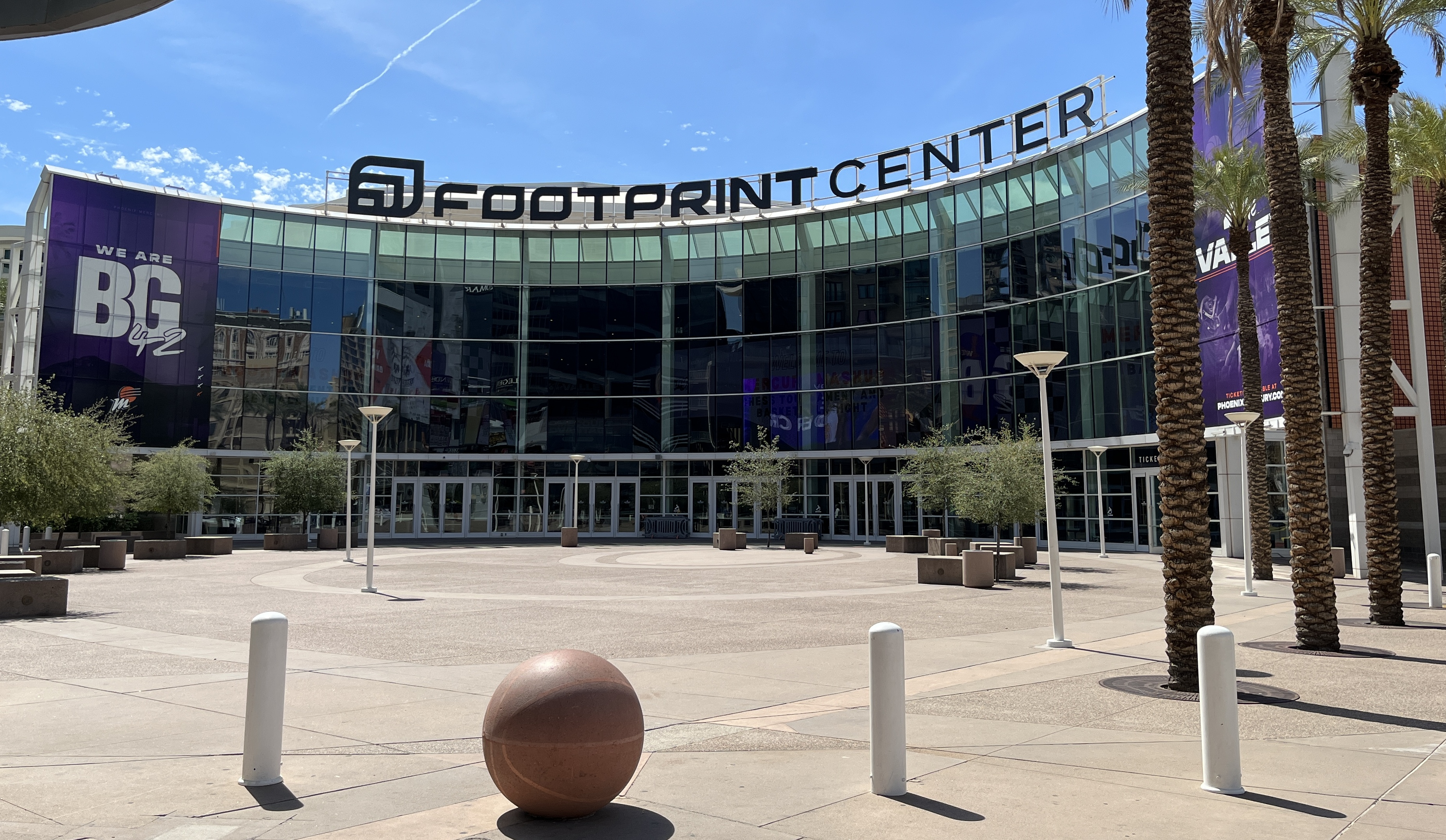
The arena when it was known as the Footprint Center

The original arena naming rights contract was sold in January 1990 to Tempe-based America West Airlines. The venue was known as America West Arena from its opening until 2006.

The previous year, America West purchased rival carrier US Airways. Although America West was the surviving airline, it took the US Airways name as did the venue. This was the second arena that the company owned the naming rights after the now-demolished US Airways Arena (formerly Capital Centre) in Landover, Maryland.

Talking Stick Resort in nearby Scottsdale secured the new naming rights with an official announcement outside the Casino Arizona Pavilion on December 2, 2014.

The name change to Talking Stick Resort Arena was completed in September 2015, in time for the start of the 2015–16 Phoenix Suns season.

After negotiations on a contract extension stalled earlier on in the year due to the COVID-19 pandemic in Arizona, Talking Stick Resort officially announced the naming rights deal expired on November 6, 2020. Until a new agreement was reached, the venue was known as Phoenix Suns Arena; prior to this, it was briefly known as PHX Arena.

On July 16, 2021, it was announced that Gilbert-based materials science company Footprint had secured the arena naming rights, naming it the Footprint Center as part of a long-term partnership with the Suns ownership and the company. The naming change went into effect by Game 5 of the 2021 NBA Finals for the Suns.

On February 18, 2025, it was announced that the arena would be seeking a new naming rights partner and would no longer go by the Footprint Center. It was temporarily called PHX Arena until a new naming rights partner was found, but Footprint remained a sustainability partner with the Suns and Mercury. Earlier, workers had been seen removing Footprint Center signage, upon receiving word that the deal had expired.

On October 2, 2025, the name was changed to Mortgage Matchup Center after the service provided by United Wholesale Mortgage, which Suns and Mercury owner Mat Ishbia owns.

== See also ==
- List of historic properties in Phoenix, Arizona
- List of indoor arenas in the United States

Events and tenants
Preceded by Arizona Veterans Memorial Coliseum	Home of the Phoenix Suns; 1992–present	Succeeded by Incumbent
Preceded by First Arena	Home of the Phoenix Coyotes; 1996–2003	Succeeded by Glendale Arena
Preceded by Target Center; New Orleans Arena	Host of the NBA All-Star Game; 1995; 2009	Succeeded by Alamodome; Cowboys Stadium
