= Van Halen 2007–2008 North American Tour =

2007–08 concert tour by Van Halen

- Tour by Van Halen
- Poster to the first concert in Charlotte, North Carolina
- Location: North America
- Start date: September 27, 2007
- End date: July 3, 2008
- Legs: 4
- No. of shows: 76 played; 25 postponed, all rescheduled

Van Halen concert chronology
- Summer Tour (2004); North American Tour (2007–2008); A Different Kind of Truth Tour (2012–2013)

The Van Halen 2007–2008 Tour was a North American concert tour occurring in the fall of 2007 and winter and spring of 2008 for hard rock band Van Halen. It was Van Halen's first tour since 2004 (which itself was the band's only tour since 1998), and the first one with original singer David Lee Roth since he left the band in 1985. Roth was with the band from 1974 to 1985, when the band rose to prominence.

The tour was originally going to be a fifty date summer tour in 2007 due to the massive success, selling out in almost every city played the tour was Van Halens highest grossing tour to date. When rescheduled, it was announced as a twenty-five date tour in Winter 2007. Gradually, dates were added, bringing it up to forty dates. In November 2007, the band announced an extension of the tour into 2008, eventually adding thirty-four new dates to the tour, bringing the total up to seventy-four, ending in April . Ultimately, the tour was then re-branded as the "Van Halen 2007–2008 North American Tour". A number of dates were postponed in early March, due to a reported illness Eddie Van Halen appeared to be suffering from.

== History ==
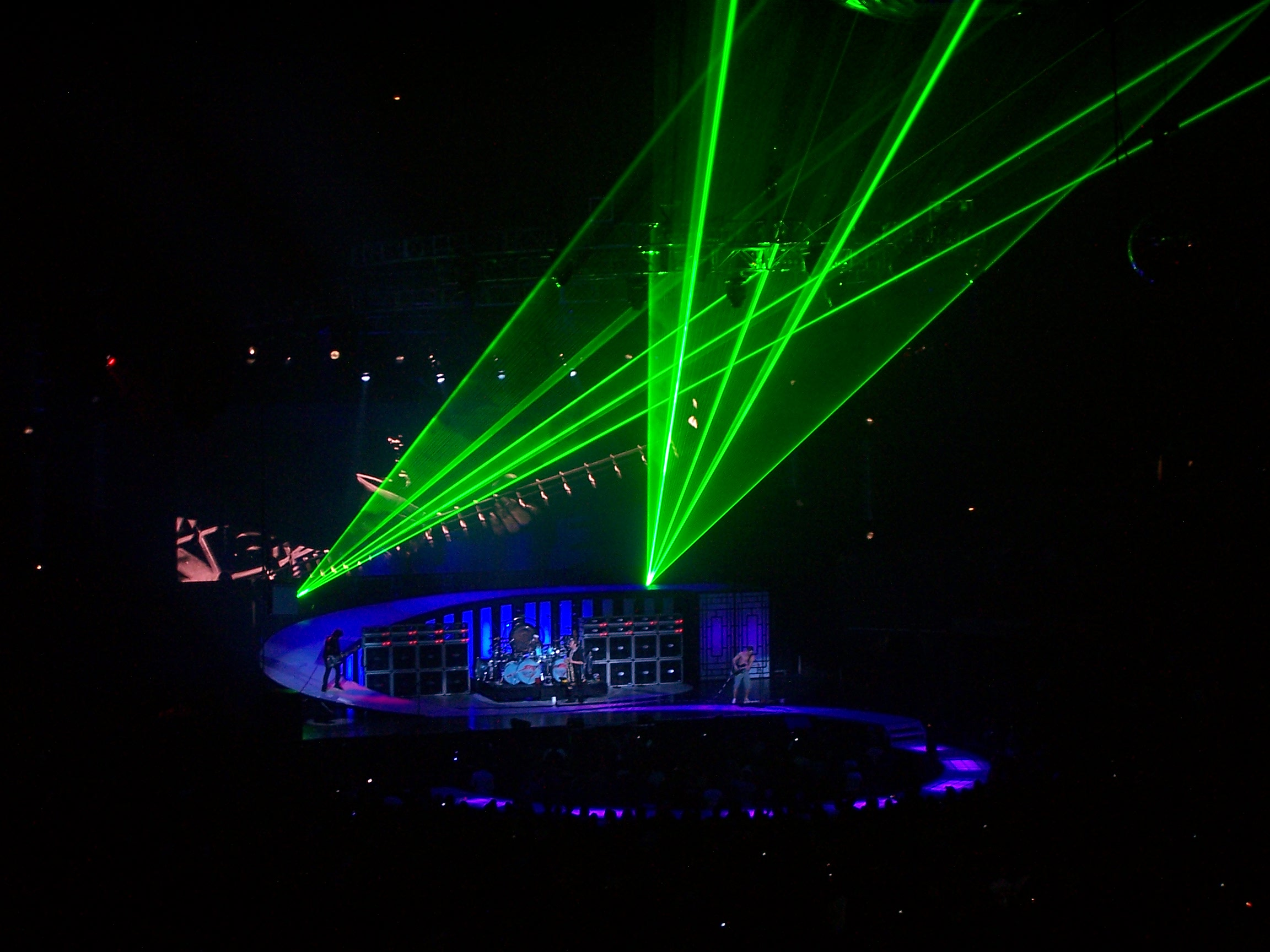
Van Halen perform at Air Canada Centre in Toronto, October 12, 2007.

A Van Halen tour with Roth was rumoured for months beforehand, and there had been discussions about a reunion with him for years (in part fueled by Roth's first public attempt at a reunion with Van Halen going wrong) but with no success. "Ed and Al hated that guy," noted Sammy Hagar. "Really hated him. I would never have believed they'd get back together." Three times in 2000–2001, Roth entered the 5150 studio (Eddie Van Halen's personal recording studio) with the Van Halen brothers to jam.

An angle to the tour was that Eddie Van Halen's 16-year-old son Wolfgang Van Halen was the new bassist; the first time any slot other than the vocalist had changed since 1974. It was rumored original bassist Michael Anthony had not been asked to be a part of this reunion. However, this rumor was put to rest when, during an interview, Alex Van Halen stated the band reached out to Michael Anthony to invite him to join the tour and make it an official Van Halen Reunion Tour, but none of the phone calls to Anthony were answered, nor did he return any of those unanswered phone calls. Wolfgang, was a mere 16 years old at the time, stepped up to fill the void. The tour sold well, selling out several dates. Initially 25 dates across the USA/Canada were announced, but 50 more were added due to the demand.

The tour started on September 27, 2007 and finished on July 3, 2008 with a total of 76 dates. The band's last tour, with Sammy Hagar in 2004 (against which this tour was compared directly), was originally set to be 50 dates and was extended to 80.

Ky-Mani Marley, son of reggae artist Bob Marley, opened each show bar the final two during the first three legs of the tour. R&B singer Ryan Shaw announced that, beginning on February 22, he would be the opening act for the remainder of the tour. Shaw began to tour with the band starting with the Las Vegas show on April 19.

The tour was officially named the "Van Halen Fall 2007 Tour" during early announcements. A "Merry Christmas" message on the Van Halen website referred to the "2007 tour", with no new title given for the 2008 leg. The website merely stated, "As Van Halen readies for a much needed holiday break, it's back on the road in 2008 to continue the tour." Extra dates were added repeatedly, and all postponed dates were made up for at later stages, with no information on if the "2007 tour" actually had a scheduled ending.

Ultimately, the tour grossed over $93 million, the band's most profitable to date.

== Support acts ==
- Ky-Mani Marley
- The Tragically Hip
- Passafire
- Ryan Shaw

== Tour dates ==
List of 2007 concerts
Date	City	Country	Venue
September 27, 2007	Charlotte	United States	Charlotte Bobcats Arena^{1}
September 29, 2007	Greensboro	United States	Greensboro Coliseum
October 1, 2007	Philadelphia	United States	Wachovia Center
October 3, 2007	Philadelphia	United States	Wachovia Center
October 5, 2007	Uncasville	United States	Mohegan Sun Arena
October 7, 2007	Toronto	Canada	Air Canada Centre
October 10, 2007	Cleveland	United States	Quicken Loans Arena
October 12, 2007	Toronto	Canada	Air Canada Centre
October 14, 2007	Indianapolis	United States	Conseco Fieldhouse
October 16, 2007	Rosemont	United States	Allstate Arena
October 18, 2007	Chicago	United States	United Center
October 20, 2007	Detroit	United States	Joe Louis Arena
October 22, 2007	Auburn Hills	United States	The Palace of Auburn Hills
October 24, 2007	Minneapolis	United States	Target Center
October 26, 2007	Kansas City	United States	Sprint Center
~~October 28, 2007~~	~~St. Louis~~	United States	~~Scottrade Center~~
October 30, 2007	Boston	United States	TD Banknorth Garden
November 1, 2007	Washington, D.C.	United States	Verizon Center
November 3, 2007	East Rutherford	United States	Meadowlands Arena
November 6, 2007	Worcester	United States	DCU Center
November 8, 2007	Uniondale	United States	Nassau Coliseum
November 10, 2007	Montreal	Canada	Centre Bell
November 13, 2007	New York City	United States	Madison Square Garden
November 15, 2007	Toronto	Canada	Air Canada Centre^{2}
November 20, 2007	Los Angeles	United States	Staples Center
November 23, 2007	Glendale	United States	Jobing.com Arena
November 25, 2007	San Diego	United States	Cox Arena
November 27, 2007	Sacramento	United States	ARCO Arena
November 29, 2007	Fresno	United States	Save Mart Center
December 1, 2007	Portland	United States	Rose Garden Arena
December 3, 2007	Seattle	United States	KeyArena
December 5, 2007	Vancouver	Canada	GM Place
December 7, 2007	Calgary	Canada	Pengrowth Saddledome
December 9, 2007	Edmonton	Canada	Rexall Place
~~December 11, 2007~~	~~Calgary~~	Canada	~~Pengrowth Saddledome~~
December 14, 2007	Los Angeles	United States	Staples Center
December 16, 2007	San Jose	United States	HP Pavilion at San Jose
December 18, 2007	Anaheim	United States	Honda Center
December 20, 2007	Anaheim	United States	Honda Center
December 22, 2007	Oakland	United States	Oracle Arena
December 28, 2007	Las Vegas	United States	MGM Grand Garden Arena
December 30, 2007	Las Vegas	United States	MGM Grand Garden Arena

List of 2008 concerts
Date	City	Country	Venue
January 22, 2008	Oklahoma City	United States	Ford Center
January 24, 2008	San Antonio	United States	AT&T Center
January 26, 2008	Dallas	United States	American Airlines Center
January 28, 2008	Houston	United States	Toyota Center
January 30, 2008	North Little Rock	United States	Alltel Arena
February 1, 2008	Denver	United States	Pepsi Center
February 4, 2008	Omaha	United States	Qwest Center
February 6, 2008	Des Moines	United States	Wells Fargo Arena
February 8, 2008	New Orleans	United States	New Orleans Arena
February 10, 2008	Atlanta	United States	Philips Arena
February 12, 2008	Sunrise	United States	BankAtlantic Center
February 14, 2008	Orlando	United States	Amway Arena
February 16, 2008	Jacksonville	United States	Jacksonville Veterans Memorial Arena
February 18, 2008	Tampa	United States	St. Pete Times Forum
February 20, 2008	Sunrise	United States	BankAtlantic Center
~~February 22, 2008~~	~~Duluth~~	United States	~~Gwinnett Arena~~
~~March 3, 2008~~	~~Dallas~~	United States	~~American Airlines Center~~
~~March 5, 2008~~	~~Cincinnati~~	United States	~~U.S. Bank Arena~~
~~March 7, 2008~~	~~Raleigh~~	United States	~~RBC Center~~
~~March 9, 2008~~	~~Baltimore~~	United States	~~1st Mariner Arena~~
~~March 11, 2008~~	~~Charlottesville~~	United States	~~John Paul Jones Arena~~
~~March 13, 2008~~	~~East Rutherford~~	United States	~~Meadowlands Arena~~
~~March 15, 2008~~	~~Manchester~~	United States	~~Verizon Wireless Arena~~
~~March 17, 2008~~	~~New York City~~	United States	~~Madison Square Garden~~
~~March 19, 2008~~	~~Hershey~~	United States	~~Giant Center~~
~~March 21, 2008~~	~~Pittsburgh~~	United States	~~Mellon Arena~~
~~March 24, 2008~~	~~Providence~~	United States	~~Dunkin' Donuts Center~~
~~March 26, 2008~~	~~Uncasville~~	United States	~~Mohegan Sun Arena~~
~~March 28, 2008~~	~~Atlantic City~~	United States	~~Atlantic City Boardwalk Hall~~
~~March 30, 2008~~	~~St. Louis~~	United States	~~Scottrade Center~~
~~April 1, 2008~~	~~Columbus~~	United States	~~Value City Arena~~
~~April 3, 2008~~	~~Rosemont~~	United States	~~Allstate Arena~~
~~April 5, 2008~~	~~Grand Rapids~~	United States	~~Van Andel Arena~~
~~April 7, 2008~~	~~Milwaukee~~	United States	~~Bradley Center~~
April 17, 2008	Reno	United States	Reno Events Center
April 19, 2008	Las Vegas	United States	Mandalay Bay Events Center
April 22, 2008	Cincinnati	United States	U.S. Bank Arena
April 24, 2008	Dallas	United States	American Airlines Center
April 26, 2008	St. Louis	United States	Scottrade Center
April 28, 2008	Milwaukee	United States	Bradley Center
April 30, 2008	Pittsburgh	United States	Mellon Arena
May 2, 2008	Charlottesville	United States	John Paul Jones Arena
May 5, 2008	Raleigh	United States	RBC Center
May 7, 2008	Columbus	United States	Value City Arena
May 9, 2008	Atlantic City	United States	Boardwalk Hall
May 11, 2008	Duluth	United States	Gwinnett Arena
May 13, 2008	East Rutherford	United States	Meadowlands Arena
May 15, 2008	Baltimore	United States	1st Mariner Arena
May 18, 2008	Hershey	United States	Giant Center
May 20, 2008	Uncasville	United States	Mohegan Sun Arena
May 23, 2008	New York City	United States	Madison Square Garden
May 25, 2008	Providence	United States	Dunkin' Donuts Center
May 28, 2008	Manchester	United States	Verizon Wireless Arena
May 30, 2008	Rosemont	United States	Allstate Arena
June 2, 2008	Grand Rapids	United States	Van Andel Arena
July 3, 2008	Quebec City	Canada	Plains of Abraham

- ^Note 1David Lee Roth's first show with Van Halen since September 2, 1984.
- ^Note 2Private BlackBerry Limited show.

== Personnel ==
Van Halen

- David Lee Roth – lead vocals
- Eddie Van Halen – lead guitar, keyboards, backing vocals
- Wolfgang Van Halen – bass guitar, backing vocals
- Alex Van Halen – drums, percussion
