= Brian Hanlon =

American sculptor

Brian Hanlon is an American classically trained master sculptor and founder of Hanlon Sculpture Studio. He has created over 550 public and private art pieces since 1987. Hanlon is a nationally acclaimed artist from Toms River, New Jersey, specializing in commissioned larger-than-life-size, to-scale bronze sculptures, reliefs, trophies, plaques and awards. He is known for developing a distinguishable style of movement in contemporary American realism sculpture.

In 2015, Hanlon was named the Official Sculptor of the Naismith Memorial Basketball Hall of Fame, and in 2018 Hanlon was named the Official Sculptor of the Rose Bowl Stadium.

Hanlon has received national and local awards and commendations for his commissions, which primarily encompass the civic, historic and athletic sectors.

On January 16, 2018, Hanlon was named the "Sports Rodin", a reference to French sculptor Auguste Rodin, in the feature story "Sports Rodin Works in Bronze" by The New York Times. In 2018, the Smithsonian American Art Museum began including Hanlon's monuments in its catalogue of contemporary American sculptors. He has been the subject of several news features, as well as a short documentary about his work that was created by Brad Nau and shown on Comcast SportsNet.

2017 was the "busiest year" in Hanlon's decades-long professional career. Hanlon oversaw the unveiling of 30 new monuments, including Charles Barkley at Auburn, Evander Holyfield in Atlanta, Jackie Robinson as a football player at the Rose Bowl, and 12 Hoosier Icons in the lobby of Simon Skjodt Assembly Hall.

In July 2021, Gabe Albornoz, Montgomery County Council Vice President, announced that Hanlon would be sculpting a new piece in honor of Olympic gymnastic legend Dominique Dawes.

Hanlon uses water-based clay rather than oil-based clay because he finds it to be "firmer and less pliable," which enables him to convey movement or action in his sculptures. His commissions typically take six to 36 months to complete, based on size and scope.

== Early life and education ==
Born in Jersey City, New Jersey, Hanlon was raised in Holmdel Township, New Jersey, where he attended Holmdel High School.

Hanlon attended Brookdale Community College and Kean University and then worked in New York City as an ironworker and teamster before re-enrolling in Brookdale. Hanlon completed a Bachelor of Arts in Art Education at Monmouth University in 1988. While at Monmouth, he was a student-athlete and captain of the men's cross country team. He took graduate level courses towards a Master of Sculpture degree at Boston University from 1988 to 1990.

== Notable sculpture projects ==
- Elizabeth Freeman for Sheffield, Massachusetts
- Women's World Cup 1999 for the Rose Bowl Stadium
- Susan B. Anthony for the Adams Suffrage Centennial Committee
- Harriet Tubman for the Equal Rights Cultural Heritage Center
- Jody Conradt for The University of Texas
- Tony Robichaux for the University of Louisiana
- Jerry Coleman for the San Diego Padres
- Naismith Coaches Circle for the Basketball Hall of Fame
- "Coaches of the Year" Werner Ladder Naismith Trophy for the Basketball Hall of Fame
- Chuck Bednarik for the University of Pennsylvania
- Steve Gleason's "Rebirth" for the New Orleans Saints
- Yogi Berra for the Yogi Berra Museum and Learning Center
- Shaquille O'Neal for Louisiana State University
- Bob Cousy for the College of the Holy Cross
- Michael Horrocks for West Chester University
- Leavander Johnson for Atlantic City, NJ
- Fr. Pedro Arrupe, S.J.
- Pope John Paul II
- Fannie Lou Hamer for Ruleville, MS
- 2nd Lt. Carol Ann Drazba, R.N. for Scranton, PA
- George Rogers for Liberty University
- "Teamwork" Public Safety for Westminster, CO
- Fallen Officers Memorial for Perth Amboy, NJ
- 100th Fire Department Anniversary for Bridgeville, DE
- W-6 Firefighter Memorial for Worcester, MA
- Bearcat for Binghamton University
- Golden Eagle in Flight for Clarion University
- Panther for Florida International University
- Hawk for Monmouth University
- Statue of Dominique Wilkins at State Farm Arena
- Statue of Evander Holyfield for Atlanta

== Personal life ==
Hanlon is married to the former Michele Adamkowski, a soccer stand-out at Monmouth University, and together the couple has five children. Michele was the model and subject of one of Hanlon's first sculptures when he created his "Involved Student" for Monmouth's campus in 1988 that featured her lying on the ground with a soccer ball and gym bag while reading a text book.
