= The Over and Out Tour =

2024–25 concert tour by Jeff Lynne's ELO

- Tour by Jeff Lynne's ELO
- Promotional poster example
- Location: Europe; North America
- Start date: 24 August 2024
- End date: 9 July 2025
- Legs: 2
- No. of shows: 35

Jeff Lynne's ELO concert chronology
- Jeff Lynne's ELO Tour 2019 (2019); The Over and Out Tour (2024–25)

The Over and Out Tour was a farewell concert tour by English rock band Jeff Lynne's ELO. Rooney was the opening act for the North American leg of the tour in 2024. Jeff Lynne was "unambiguous about this tour being the band’s last."

The tour started in Palm Desert, California on August 24, 2024, and finished its first leg at Footprint Center in Phoenix, Arizona on October 29, 2024. The first leg was originally set to end with back-to-back concerts at Kia Forum in Inglewood, California on October 25–26, 2024, before the Phoenix concert was canceled and rescheduled as its conclusion.

== Tour dates ==
List of 2024 concerts
Date	City	Country	Venue	Attendance	Revenue
August 24, 2024	Palm Desert	United States	Acrisure Arena	—	—
August 27, 2024	Seattle	United States	Climate Pledge Arena	—	—
August 28, 2024	Vancouver	Canada	Rogers Arena	—	—
August 30, 2024	Portland	United States	Moda Center	—	—
September 1, 2024	San Francisco	United States	Chase Center	—	—
September 6, 2024	St. Louis	United States	Enterprise Center	—	—
September 7, 2024	Indianapolis	United States	Gainbridge Fieldhouse	—	—
September 9, 2024	Toronto	Canada	Scotiabank Arena	—	—
September 10, 2024	Pittsburgh	United States	PPG Paints Arena	—	—
September 13, 2024	Cincinnati	United States	Heritage Bank Center	—	—
September 14, 2024	Cleveland	United States	Rocket Mortgage FieldHouse	—	—
September 16, 2024	New York City	United States	Madison Square Garden	—	—
September 17, 2024	New York City	United States	Madison Square Garden	—	—
September 20, 2024	Philadelphia	United States	Wells Fargo Center	—	—
September 21, 2024	Philadelphia	United States	Wells Fargo Center	—	—
September 23, 2024	Boston	United States	TD Garden	—	—
September 25, 2024	Washington, DC	United States	Capital One Arena	—	—
September 27, 2024	Chicago	United States	United Center	—	—
September 28, 2024	Chicago	United States	United Center	—	—
September 30, 2024	Saint Paul	United States	Xcel Energy Center	—	—
October 2, 2024	Denver	United States	Ball Arena	—	—
October 9, 2024	Detroit	United States	Little Caesars Arena	—	—
October 11, 2024	Nashville	United States	Bridgestone Arena	—	—
October 12, 2024	Atlanta	United States	State Farm Arena	—	—
October 15, 2024	Austin	United States	Moody Center	—	—
October 16, 2024	Houston	United States	Toyota Center	—	—
October 18, 2024	Dallas	United States	American Airlines Center	—	—
October 23, 2024	Sacramento	United States	Golden 1 Center	—	—
October 25, 2024	Inglewood	United States	Kia Forum	—	—
October 26, 2024	Inglewood	United States	Kia Forum	—	—
October 29, 2024	Phoenix	United States	Footprint Center	—	—

List of 2025 concerts
Date	City	Country	Venue	Attendance	Revenue
July 5, 2025	Birmingham	England	Utilita Arena	—	—
July 6, 2025	Birmingham	England	Utilita Arena	—	—
July 9, 2025	Manchester	England	Co-op Live	—	—
July 10, 2025	Manchester	England	Co-op Live	—	Show Cancelled
July 13, 2025	London	England	Hyde Park	—	Show Cancelled
