= Harold Martin Jr. =

Atlanta businessman

Harold Martin Jr. is an Atlanta based businessman who is the CEO of the Taco Mac chain of restaurants with locations in Georgia and Tennessee. Before that he served as interim president of Morehouse College.

Before becoming the Morehouses' interim-president in 2017, Martin served as an associate partner at McKinsey & Co., a management consulting firm. He was a leader in the firm's Higher Education Practice, which studied trends transforming higher education and best practices. Martin is married with two children.

== Education ==
Martin, Jr. is a 2002 alumnus of Morehouse College who went on to earn an MBA from the Harvard Business School and a JD from Yale Law School.
