= Face to Face 2009 =

2009 concert tour by Elton John and Billy Joel

- Continental tour by Elton John and Billy Joel
- Poster to the concert in Toronto, Canada
- Location: North America
- Start date: 2 March 2009
- End date: 1 August 2009
- Legs: 3
- No. of shows: 27
Elton John tour chronology
Rocket Man: Greatest Hits Live (2007–10)	Face to Face 2009 (2009)	Face to Face 2010 (2010)
Billy Joel tour chronology
Face to Face 2003 (2003)	Face to Face 2009 (2009)	Face to Face 2010 (2010)

Face to Face 2009 was a 2009 concert tour by Elton John and Billy Joel, their first concert tour together in 7 years since Face to Face 2003. The tour originally consisted of four legs throughout the year. The last leg, in fall 2009, was cancelled due to an E. coli infection that John had picked up.

Joel stated in 2012 that he would no longer tour with John because it restrains his setlists.

== Tour ==
The cancelled shows were rescheduled for the following year (Face to Face 2010).

The first two legs focused on arenas in the United States as would have the fourth leg, but it was cancelled. The third leg focused on the major baseball stadiums in the United States.

== Tour dates ==
List of concerts, showing date, city, country, venue, opening act, tickets sold, number of available tickets and amount of gross revenue
Date	City	Country	Venue	Attendance	Revenue
North America
2 March 2009	Jacksonville	United States	Jacksonville Veterans Memorial Arena	13,433 / 13,433	$1,807,308
5 March 2009	Tampa	United States	St. Pete Times Forum	19,401 / 19,401	$2,141,042
7 March 2009	Charlotte	United States	Time Warner Cable Arena	17,908 / 17,908	$1,913,847
10 March 2009	Cincinnati	United States	U.S. Bank Arena	16,065 / 16,065	$1,914,327
14 March 2009	Atlanta	United States	Philips Arena	18,883 / 18,883	$2,049,955
17 March 2009	Tulsa	United States	BOK Center	17,335 / 17,335	$1,940,793
19 March 2009	Houston	United States	Toyota Center	16,612 / 16,612	$2,125,479
21 March 2009	San Antonio	United States	AT&T Center	17,203 / 17,203	$1,893,547
26 March 2009	Phoenix	United States	US Airways Center	17,495 / 17,495	$2,129,764
28 March 2009	Anaheim	United States	Honda Center	33,548 / 33,548	$3,576,465
30 March 2009	Anaheim	United States	Honda Center	33,548 / 33,548	$3,576,465
2 May 2009	Fargo	United States	Fargodome	20,573 / 20,573	$1,616,699
5 May 2009	St. Paul	United States	Xcel Energy Center	18,273 / 18,273	$2,509,482
7 May 2009	Madison	United States	Kohl Center	15,943 / 15,943	$1,883,487
12 May 2009	Omaha	United States	Qwest Center Omaha	17,211 / 17,211	$2,258,537
14 May 2009	St. Louis	United States	Scottrade Center	19,692 / 19,692	$2,450,119
16 May 2009	Nashville	United States	Sommet Center	17,211 / 17,211	$2,258,537
19 May 2009	Indianapolis	United States	Conseco Fieldhouse	16,840 / 16,840	$2,013,316
21 May 2009	Auburn Hills	United States	The Palace of Auburn Hills	20,827 / 20,827	$2,320,120
23 May 2009	Cleveland	United States	Quicken Loans Arena	20,045 / 20,045	$2,562,259
26 May 2009	Toronto	Canada	Air Canada Centre	37,266 / 37,266	$6,236,533
30 May 2009	Toronto	Canada	Air Canada Centre	37,266 / 37,266	$6,236,533
1 June 2009	Ottawa	Canada	Scotiabank Place	19,440 / 19,440	$2,576,723
3 June 2009	Montreal	Canada	Bell Centre	16,555 / 16,555	$2,394,576
11 July 2009	Washington, D.C.	United States	Nationals Park	38,617 / 38,617	$4,638,645
14 July 2009	Columbus	United States	Nationwide Arena	18,395 / 18,395	$2,027,791
16 July 2009	Chicago	United States	Wrigley Field	77,520 / 77,520	$11,154,840
18 July 2009	Foxborough	United States	Gillette Stadium	52,007 / 52,007	$6,209,342
21 July 2009	Chicago	United States	Wrigley Field	(Note: The score data is representative of the two shows in Chicago, Illinois at Wrigley Field on 16 July and 21 July respectively.)	
30 July 2009	Philadelphia	United States	Citizens Bank Park	89,690 / 89,690	$11,853,455
1 August 2009	Philadelphia	United States	Citizens Bank Park	89,690 / 89,690	$11,853,455
Total				665,371 / 665,371 (100%)	$83,818,343

Cancellations and rescheduled shows

4 November 2009	Seattle, Washington	KeyArena	Rescheduled to 3 February 2010
7 November 2009	Seattle, Washington	KeyArena	Rescheduled to 6 February 2010
10 November 2009	Portland, Oregon	Rose Garden	Rescheduled to 10 February 2010
14 November 2009	Oakland, California	Oracle Arena	Rescheduled to 13 February 2010
17 November 2009	San Jose, California	HP Pavilion	Rescheduled to 16 February 2010
20 November 2009	Salt Lake City, Utah	EnergySolutions Center	Rescheduled to 19 February 2010
22 November 2009	Denver, Colorado	Pepsi Center	Rescheduled to 22 February 2010
25 November 2009	Oklahoma City, Oklahoma	Ford Center	Rescheduled to 25 February 2010
28 November 2009	Little Rock, Arkansas	Verizon Center	Cancelled
1 December 2009	Kansas City, Missouri	Sprint Center	Rescheduled to 27 February 2010
4 December 2009	Buffalo, New York	HSBC Arena	Rescheduled to 9 March 2010
7 December 2009	Albany, New York	Times Union Center	Rescheduled to 11 March 2010

== Setlist ==
Standard setlist

Elton John & Billy Joel & Bands

1. Your Song
2. Just the Way You Are
3. Don't Let the Sun Go Down on Me
4. My Life

Elton John & Band

1. Funeral for a Friend/Love Lies Bleeding
2. Saturday Night's Alright for Fighting
3. Levon
4. Madman Across the Water
5. Tiny Dancer
6. Goodbye Yellow Brick Road
7. Daniel
8. Rocket Man
9. Philadelphia Freedom
10. I'm Still Standing
11. Crocodile Rock

Billy Joel & Band

1. Prelude/Angry Young Man
2. Movin' Out
3. Allentown
4. Zanzibar
5. Don't Ask Me Why
6. She's Always a Woman
7. Scenes from an Italian Restaurant
8. River of Dreams
9. We Didn't Start the Fire
10. It's Still Rock and Roll to Me
11. Only the Good Die Young

Elton John & Billy Joel & Bands

1. I Guess That's Why They Call It the Blues
2. Uptown Girl
3. The Bitch is Back
4. You May Be Right
5. Bennie and the Jets
6. Candle in the Wind
7. Piano Man
