= Billy Joel in Concert =

International concert tour

- Tour by Billy Joel
- Location: Asia; Europe; North America; Oceania
- Start date: January 7, 2014
- End date: February 22, 2025
- No. of shows: 245
- Box office: $454.9 million (168 shows)

Billy Joel concert chronology
- Face to Face (2010); Billy Joel in Concert (2014–2025)

Billy Joel in Concert was a concert tour by the American singer-songwriter Billy Joel. After several concerts beforehand, in the fall of 2013, the concert tour began in Sunrise, Florida, and ended prematurely on February 22, 2025 in Uncasville, Connecticut, following several postponements due to health issues and eventual cancellation following Joel being diagnosed with normal pressure hydrocephalus.

== Background ==
After completing the 2010 Face to Face Tour with Elton John, Joel did not return until 2013. He played several concerts, including Sydney in Australia as well as four concerts in the United Kingdom.

The tour began in Sunrise, Florida, with two concerts at the BB&T Center in January 2014.

=== Madison Square Garden ===
The tour created a concert residency at Madison Square Garden in New York City. Joel committed to playing one show a month at Madison Square Garden as long as there is a demand for tickets. His first monthly show at the Garden was January 27, 2014. At his thirteenth consecutive monthly performance on January 9, 2015, Joel broke his 2006 record for the most consecutive sold-out shows at the venue. On July 1, 2015, Joel set the record for most shows at the Garden by a single artist; his 65th all-time show broke the record previously held by Elton John and the Grateful Dead. His 74th consecutive monthly and 120th all-time MSG performance was slated for March 2020, but had to be postponed due to COVID-19. Joel resumed his MSG performances in November 2021.

The long-running residency has included various guest performers over the years. In June 2023, Joel announced that he would be ending the residency. The final concert and his 150th overall MSG show was held on July 25, 2024, with Axl Rose as the special guest, together performing "Live and Let Die" and "Highway to Hell".

The 100th residency show was held on March 28, 2024, with Jerry Seinfeld and Sting appearing as special guests. Seinfeld presented Joel with a banner in commemoration of Joel's 100 MSG residency concerts hung on the rafters of the arena. Sting performed with Joel on the songs "Big Man on Mulberry Street" and "Every Little Thing She Does Is Magic". The concert was televised on CBS on April 14, 2024, and became available to stream the next day on Paramount+ as Billy Joel: The 100th - Live at Madison Square Garden, marking Joel's first ever concert special on network television. Due to an over run error from CBS' 2024 Masters Tournament coverage cutting into prime time, the show was delayed by half an hour, and part of the final minutes were cut off by several CBS stations to air local news. Several viewers complained, and CBS aired a rebroadcast of the entire show on Friday, April 19, and the timing error was fixed.

=== Nassau Veterans Memorial Coliseum ===
Joel performed the last concert at Long Island's Nassau Coliseum on August 4, 2015, prior to the venue's extensive renovation. The venue re-opened its doors on April 5, 2017, with Joel being the arena's first post-renovation event.

== Set list ==
This setlist was performed at the January 11, 2019, concert held at Amway Center in Orlando. It does not represent all shows throughout the tour.

1. "Big Shot"
2. "Miami 2017 (Seen the Lights Go Out on Broadway)"
3. "Summer, Highland Falls"
4. "The Entertainer"
5. "All for Leyna"
6. "Zanzibar"
7. "Vienna"
8. "Movin' Out (Anthony's Song)"
9. "New York State of Mind"
10. "Don't Ask Me Why"
11. "And So It Goes"
12. "Allentown"
13. "All About Soul"
14. "She's Always a Woman"
15. "My Life"
16. "The River of Dreams"
17. "Only the Good Die Young"
18. "Nessun dorma"
19. "Scenes from an Italian Restaurant"
20. "Piano Man"

Encore

1. "We Didn't Start the Fire"
2. "Uptown Girl"
3. "It's Still Rock and Roll to Me"
4. "You May Be Right"

== Tour dates ==
Date	City	Country	Venue	Attendance	Box Office
North America
January 7, 2014	Sunrise	United States	BB&T Center	39,486 / 39,486	$3,206,765
January 11, 2014	Sunrise	United States	BB&T Center	39,486 / 39,486	$3,206,765
January 17, 2014	Tampa	United States	Tampa Bay Times Forum	21,852 / 21,852	$1,644,850
January 22, 2014	Jacksonville	United States	Jacksonville Veterans Memorial Arena	12,112 / 12,112	$914,440
January 27, 2014	New York City	United States	Madison Square Garden	36,804 / 36,804	$3,959,768
February 3, 2014	New York City	United States	Madison Square Garden	36,804 / 36,804	$3,959,768
February 9, 2014	Raleigh	United States	PNC Arena	16,015 / 16,015	$1,500,041
February 15, 2014	Auburn Hills	United States	The Palace of Auburn Hills	18,553 / 18,553	$1,434,491
February 21, 2014	Pittsburgh	United States	Consol Energy Center	18,037 / 18,037	$1,665,977
March 9, 2014	Toronto	Canada	Air Canada Centre	16,616 / 16,616	$1,703,300
March 14, 2014	Nashville	United States	Bridgestone Arena	15,815 / 15,815	$1,371,387
March 21, 2014	New York City	United States	Madison Square Garden	18,668 / 18,668	$2,005,391
April 1, 2014	Cleveland	United States	Quicken Loans Arena	18,259 / 18,259	$1,888,450
April 6, 2014	Louisville	United States	KFC Yum! Center	15,979 / 15,979	$1,439,334
April 11, 2014	St. Louis	United States	Scottrade Center	15,167 / 15,515	$1,436,167
April 18, 2014	New York City	United States	Madison Square Garden	37,353 / 37,353	$4,011,179
May 9, 2014	New York City	United States	Madison Square Garden	37,353 / 37,353	$4,011,179
May 17, 2014	Los Angeles	United States	Hollywood Bowl	52,033 / 52,033	$5,348,036
May 22, 2014	Los Angeles	United States	Hollywood Bowl	52,033 / 52,033	$5,348,036
May 27, 2014	Los Angeles	United States	Hollywood Bowl	52,033 / 52,033	$5,348,036
June 1, 2014	Phoenix	United States	US Airways Center	15,043 / 15,043	$1,482,446
June 7, 2014	Las Vegas	United States	MGM Grand Garden Arena	13,208 / 13,208	$1,937,979
June 21, 2014	New York City	United States	Madison Square Garden	18,673 / 18,673	$2,003,418
June 26, 2014	Boston	United States	Fenway Park	36,526 / 36,526	$3,790,125
July 2, 2014	New York City	United States	Madison Square Garden	18,684 / 18,684	$2,003,418
July 11, 2014 (Note: The July 11, 2014, concert in Quebec City was part of Quebec City Summer Festival.)	Quebec City	Canada	Plains of Abraham	—N/a	—N/a
July 18, 2014	Chicago	United States	Wrigley Field	41,957 / 41,957	$4,668,557
July 26, 2014	Washington, D.C.	United States	Nationals Park	38,487 / 38,487	$4,200,480
August 2, 2014	Philadelphia	United States	Citizens Bank Park	40,335 / 40,335	$4,122,996
August 7, 2014	New York City	United States	Madison Square Garden	74,986 / 74,986	$8,043,482
September 17, 2014	New York City	United States	Madison Square Garden	74,986 / 74,986	$8,043,482
October 2, 2014	New York City	United States	Madison Square Garden	74,986 / 74,986	$8,043,482
November 25, 2014	New York City	United States	Madison Square Garden	74,986 / 74,986	$8,043,482
December 5, 2014	University Park	United States	Bryce Jordan Center	12,077 / 12,077	$1,345,921
December 18, 2014	New York City	United States	Madison Square Garden	18,771 / 18,771	$2,011,621
December 31, 2014	Orlando	United States	Amway Center	15,752 / 15,752	$1,739,342
January 9, 2015	New York City	United States	Madison Square Garden	224,244 / 224,244 (Note: The score data is combined from the shows held at the Madison Square Garden on January 9, February 18, March 9, April 3, May 28, June 20, July 1, August 20, September 26, October 21, November 19, and December 17.)	$26,315,625
January 22, 2015	Dallas	United States	American Airlines Center	15,622 / 15,622	$1,538,497
January 31, 2015	Miami	United States	American Airlines Arena	17,567 / 17,567	$1,673,829
February 18, 2015	New York City	United States	Madison Square Garden	—	—
February 28, 2015	Atlanta	United States	Philips Arena	16,596 / 16,596	$1,616,997
March 9, 2015	New York City	United States	Madison Square Garden	—	—
March 20, 2015	Syracuse	United States	Carrier Dome	36,594 / 36,594	$2,857,331
April 3, 2015	New York City	United States	Madison Square Garden	—	—
May 1, 2015	Kansas City	United States	Sprint Center	17,429 / 17,429	$1,600,611
May 16, 2015	Minneapolis	United States	Target Center	18,183 / 18,183	$1,802,477
May 28, 2015	New York City	United States	Madison Square Garden	—	—
June 6, 2015	Virginia Beach	United States	Farm Bureau Live	18,732 / 18,732	$1,314,901
June 14, 2015 (Note: The June 14, 2015, concert in Manchester was part of the Bonnaroo Music Festival.)	Manchester	United States	Great Stage Park	—N/a	—N/a
June 20, 2015	New York City	United States	Madison Square Garden	—	—
July 1, 2015	New York City	United States	Madison Square Garden	—	—
July 16, 2015	Boston	United States	Fenway Park	36,034 / 36,034	$4,129,877
July 25, 2015	Baltimore	United States	M&T Bank Stadium	39,662 / 39,662	$4,481,549
August 4, 2015	Uniondale	United States	Nassau Coliseum	16,791 / 16,791	$1,782,576
August 13, 2015	Philadelphia	United States	Citizens Bank Park	38,313 / 38,313	$3,939,042
August 20, 2015	New York City	United States	Madison Square Garden	—	—
August 27, 2015	Chicago	United States	Wrigley Field	41,183 / 41,183	$4,521,252
September 5, 2015	San Francisco	United States	AT&T Park	37,064 / 37,064	$3,924,448
September 16, 2015	Denver	United States	Pepsi Center	17,151 / 17,151	$1,623,146
September 26, 2015	New York City	United States	Madison Square Garden	—	—
October 21, 2015	New York City	United States	Madison Square Garden	—	—
November 6, 2015	Houston	United States	Toyota Center	15,985 / 15,985	$1,663,272
November 19, 2015	New York City	United States	Madison Square Garden	—	—
December 5, 2015	Charlotte	United States	Time Warner Cable Arena	17,345 / 17,345	$1,703,997
December 17, 2015	New York City	United States	Madison Square Garden	—	—
December 31, 2015	Sunrise	United States	BB&T Center	18,047 / 18,047	$2,271,196
January 7, 2016	New York City	United States	Madison Square Garden	—N/a	—N/a
January 22, 2016	Tampa	United States	Amalie Arena	18,515 / 18,515	$1,733,105
February 13, 2016	New York City	United States	Madison Square Garden	—N/a	—N/a
March 15, 2016	New York City	United States	Madison Square Garden	—N/a	—N/a
March 25, 2016	Memphis	United States	FedExForum	16,228 / 16,228	$1,477,997
April 5, 2016	Cincinnati	United States	U.S. Bank Arena	16,213 / 16,213	$1,572,117
April 15, 2016	New York City	United States	Madison Square Garden	—N/a	—N/a
April 30, 2016	Las Vegas	United States	T-Mobile Arena	—N/a	—N/a
May 14, 2016	San Diego	United States	Petco Park	42,322 / 42,322	$4,778,636
May 20, 2016	Seattle	United States	Safeco Field	36,582 / 36,582	$4,045,000
May 27, 2016	New York City	United States	Madison Square Garden	—N/a	—N/a
June 17, 2016	New York City	United States	Madison Square Garden	—N/a	—N/a
July 1, 2016	Pittsburgh	United States	PNC Park	39,500 / 39,500	$4,627,472
July 9, 2016	Philadelphia	United States	Citizens Bank Park	39,303 / 39,303	$4,162,880
July 20, 2016	New York City	United States	Madison Square Garden	—N/a	—N/a
July 30, 2016	Washington, D.C.	United States	Nationals Park	37,807 / 37,807	$4,031,634
August 9, 2016	New York City	United States	Madison Square Garden	—N/a	—N/a
August 18, 2016	Boston	United States	Fenway Park	36,771 / 36,771	$3,995,381
August 26, 2016	Chicago	United States	Wrigley Field	41,997 / 41,997	$4,876,038
Europe
September 3, 2016	Frankfurt	Germany	Commerzbank-Arena	31,718 / 31,718	$3,821,370
September 10, 2016	London	England	Wembley Stadium	69,379 / 69,379	$5,948,960
North America
October 28, 2016	New York City	United States	Madison Square Garden	—N/a	—N/a
November 11, 2016	Tulsa	United States	BOK Center	17,803 / 17,803	$1,714,920
November 21, 2016	New York City	United States	Madison Square Garden	—N/a	—N/a
November 30, 2016	New York City	United States	Madison Square Garden	—N/a	—N/a
December 9, 2016	San Antonio	United States	AT&T Center	18,065 / 18,065	$1,756,003
December 17, 2016	New York City	United States	Madison Square Garden	—N/a	—N/a
December 31, 2016	Sunrise	United States	BB&T Center	18,240 / 18,240	$2,272,890
January 11, 2017	New York City	United States	Madison Square Garden	—N/a	—N/a
January 27, 2017	Orlando	United States	Amway Center	16,345/ 16,345	$1,987,556
February 10, 2017	New Orleans	United States	Smoothie King Center	16,730 / 16,730	$1,876,741
February 22, 2017	New York City	United States	Madison Square Garden	—N/a	—N/a
March 3, 2017	New York City	United States	Madison Square Garden	—N/a	—N/a
March 24, 2017	Lincoln	United States	Pinnacle Bank Arena	14,335 / 14,335	$1,751,359
April 5, 2017	Uniondale	United States	Nassau Coliseum	14,835 / 14,835	$1,740,515
April 14, 2017	New York City	United States	Madison Square Garden	—N/a	—N/a
April 28, 2017	Cumberland	United States	SunTrust Park	37,109 / 37,109	$4,623,823
May 13, 2017	Los Angeles	United States	Dodger Stadium	48,162 / 48,162	$5,046,093
May 25, 2017	New York City	United States	Madison Square Garden	—N/a	—N/a
June 6, 2017	New York City	United States	Madison Square Garden	—N/a	—N/a
June 17, 2017	Green Bay	United States	Lambeau Field	45,602 / 45,602	$4,805,909
July 5, 2017	New York City	United States	Madison Square Garden	—N/a	—N/a
July 14, 2017	Cleveland	United States	Progressive Field	32,833 / 32,833	$4,035,981
July 28, 2017	Minneapolis	United States	Target Field	38,964 / 38,964	$4,753,087
August 11, 2017	Chicago	United States	Wrigley Field	41,920 / 41,920	$4,694,156
August 21, 2017	New York City	United States	Madison Square Garden	—N/a	—N/a
August 30, 2017	Boston	United States	Fenway Park	36,446 / 36,446	$4,241,968
September 9, 2017	Philadelphia	United States	Citizens Bank Park	41,183 / 41,183	$4,529,573
September 21, 2017	St. Louis	United States	Busch Stadium	40,947 / 40,947	$4,713,441
September 30, 2017	New York City	United States	Madison Square Garden	—N/a	—N/a
October 20, 2017	New York City	United States	Madison Square Garden	—N/a	—N/a
November 3, 2017	Indianapolis	United States	Bankers Life Fieldhouse	16,594 / 16,594	$1,908,250
November 18, 2017	New York City	United States	Madison Square Garden	—N/a	—N/a
November 29, 2017	Salt Lake City	United States	Vivint Smart Home Arena	16,003 / 16,003	$1,641,808
December 8, 2017	Portland	United States	Moda Center	17,526 / 17,526	$1,903,178
December 20, 2017	New York City	United States	Madison Square Garden	—N/a	—N/a
December 31, 2017	Sunrise	United States	BB&T Center	17,927 / 17,927	$2,370,139
January 11, 2018	New York City	United States	Madison Square Garden	18,647 / 18,647	$2,324,150
February 9, 2018	Tampa	United States	Amalie Arena	18,462 / 18,462	$2,271,968
February 21, 2018	New York City	United States	Madison Square Garden	93,019 / 93,019	$11,535,277
March 28, 2018	New York City	United States	Madison Square Garden	93,019 / 93,019	$11,535,277
April 13, 2018	New York City	United States	Madison Square Garden	93,019 / 93,019	$11,535,277
May 23, 2018	New York City	United States	Madison Square Garden	93,019 / 93,019	$11,535,277
June 2, 2018	New York City	United States	Madison Square Garden	93,019 / 93,019	$11,535,277
Europe
June 16, 2018	Manchester	England	Old Trafford	49,752 / 49,752	$4,567,623
June 23, 2018	Dublin	Ireland	Aviva Stadium	40,590 / 40,590	$5,531,610
June 30, 2018	Hamburg	Germany	Volksparkstadion	32,553 / 32,553	$3,434,722
North America
July 18, 2018	New York City	United States	Madison Square Garden	18,758 / 18,758	$2,353,322
July 27, 2018	Philadelphia	United States	Citizens Bank Park	40,381 / 40,381	$4,658,037
August 10, 2018	Boston	United States	Fenway Park	36,455 / 36,455	$4,777,835
August 23, 2018	New York City	United States	Madison Square Garden	18,758 / 18,758	$2,347,729
September 7, 2018	Chicago	United States	Wrigley Field	41,180 / 41,180	$4,763,850
September 21, 2018	Kansas City	United States	Kauffman Stadium	40,589 / 40,589	$4,500,565
September 30, 2018	New York City	United States	Madison Square Garden	18,565 / 18,565	$2,437,812
October 13, 2018	Winston-Salem	United States	BB&T Field	33,422 / 33,422	$3,698,043
October 27, 2018	New York City	United States	Madison Square Garden	55,998 / 55,998	$7,037,000
November 10, 2018	New York City	United States	Madison Square Garden	55,998 / 55,998	$7,037,000
December 19, 2018	New York City	United States	Madison Square Garden	55,998 / 55,998	$7,037,000
December 31, 2018	Uniondale	United States	Nassau Coliseum	14,515 / 14,515	$2,230,599
January 11, 2019	Orlando	United States	Amway Center	16,195 / 16,195	$2,126,633
January 24, 2019	New York City	United States	Madison Square Garden	36,828 / 36,828	$4,875,481
February 14, 2019	New York City	United States	Madison Square Garden	36,828 / 36,828	$4,875,481
March 9, 2019	Phoenix	United States	Chase Field	40,964 / 40,964	$4,837,237
March 21, 2019	New York City	United States	Madison Square Garden	37,200 / 37,200	$4,932,410
April 12, 2019	New York City	United States	Madison Square Garden	37,200 / 37,200	$4,932,410
April 26, 2019	Milwaukee	United States	Miller Park	41,237 / 41,237	$4,197,551
May 9, 2019	New York City	United States	Madison Square Garden	18,673 / 18,673	$2,656,202
May 24, 2019	Philadelphia	United States	Citizens Bank Park	40,969 / 40,969	$4,781,392
June 2, 2019	New York City	United States	Madison Square Garden	18,572 / 18,572	$2,531,572
Europe
June 22, 2019	London	England	Wembley Stadium	63,804 / 63,804	$6,509,948
North America
July 11, 2019	New York City	United States	Madison Square Garden	18,666 / 18,666	$2,666,028
July 26, 2019	Baltimore	United States	Oriole Park at Camden Yards	39,246 / 39,246	$6,013,337
August 8, 2019	Denver	United States	Coors Field	44,744 / 44,744	$5,684,083
August 28, 2019	New York City	United States	Madison Square Garden	18,552 / 18,552	$2,481,242
September 14, 2019	Boston	United States	Fenway Park	36,500 / 36,500	$5,075,585
September 27, 2019	New York City	United States	Madison Square Garden	—N/a	—N/a
October 12, 2019	Arlington	United States	Globe Life Park in Arlington	43,626 / 43,626	$5,405,903
October 25, 2019	New York City	United States	Madison Square Garden	55,809 / 55,809	$7,482,185
November 15, 2019	New York City	United States	Madison Square Garden	55,809 / 55,809	$7,482,185
December 11, 2019	New York City	United States	Madison Square Garden	55,809 / 55,809	$7,482,185
January 10, 2020	Hollywood	United States	Hard Rock Live	—N/a	—N/a
January 25, 2020	New York City	United States	Madison Square Garden	18,679 / 18,679	$2,564,160
February 7, 2020	Tampa	United States	Amalie Arena	18,378 / 18,378	$2,358,301
February 20, 2020	New York City	United States	Madison Square Garden	18,229 / 18,229	$2,418,296
March 6, 2020	Mexico City	Mexico	Foro Sol	45,645 / 45,645	$3,938,450
August 4, 2021 (Note: The August 4, 2021 concert in Boston was originally scheduled for August 28, 2020, but was rescheduled due to the COVID-19 pandemic.)	Boston	United States	Fenway Park	—N/a	—N/a
August 14, 2021 (Note: The August 14, 2021 concert in Orchard Park was originally scheduled for August 15, 2020, but was rescheduled due to the COVID-19 pandemic.)	Orchard Park	United States	Highmark Stadium	—N/a	—N/a
September 10, 2021 (Note: The September 10, 2021 concert in Cincinnati was originally scheduled for September 11, 2020, but was rescheduled due to the COVID-19 pandemic.)	Cincinnati	United States	Great American Ball Park	—N/a	—N/a
October 23, 2021 (Note: The October 23, 2021 concert in Austin, Texas was part of the 2021 United States Grand Prix.)	Austin	United States	Circuit of the Americas	—N/a	—N/a
November 5, 2021 (Note: The November 5, 2021 concert in New York City was originally scheduled for March 19, 2020, but was rescheduled due to the COVID-19 pandemic.)	New York City	United States	Madison Square Garden	—N/a	—N/a
December 20, 2021 (Note: The December 20, 2021 concert in New York City was originally scheduled for April 10, 2020, but was rescheduled due to the COVID-19 pandemic.)	New York City	United States	Madison Square Garden	—N/a	—N/a
January 28, 2022	Hollywood	United States	Hard Rock Live	—N/a	—N/a
February 12, 2022 (Note: The February 12, 2022 concert in New York City was originally scheduled for June 6, 2020, but was rescheduled due to the COVID-19 pandemic.)	New York City	United States	Madison Square Garden	—N/a	—N/a
February 26, 2022	Las Vegas	United States	Allegiant Stadium	—N/a	—N/a
March 12, 2022	Orlando	United States	Camping World Stadium	—N/a	—N/a
March 24, 2022 (Note: The March 24, 2022 concert in New York City was originally scheduled for July 23, 2020, but was rescheduled due to the COVID-19 pandemic.)	New York City	United States	Madison Square Garden	—N/a	—N/a
April 8, 2022	New York City	United States	Madison Square Garden	—N/a	—N/a
April 23, 2022 (Note: The April 23, 2022 concert in Charlotte was originally scheduled for April 18, 2020, but was rescheduled due to the COVID-19 pandemic.)	Charlotte	United States	Bank of America Stadium	—N/a	—N/a
May 14, 2022	New York City	United States	Madison Square Garden	—N/a	—N/a
May 28, 2022	Greenwich	United States	Roger Sherman Baldwin Park	—N/a	—N/a
June 10, 2022	New York City	United States	Madison Square Garden	—N/a	—N/a
June 25, 2022 (Note: The June 25, 2022 concert in Notre Dame was originally scheduled for June 20, 2020, but was rescheduled due to the COVID-19 pandemic.)	Notre Dame	United States	Notre Dame Stadium	—N/a	—N/a
July 9, 2022 (Note: The July 9, 2022 concert in Detroit was originally scheduled for July 10, 2020, but was rescheduled due to the COVID-19 pandemic.)	Detroit	United States	Comerica Park	—N/a	—N/a
July 20, 2022	New York City	United States	Madison Square Garden	—N/a	—N/a
August 11, 2022	Pittsburgh	United States	PNC Park	—N/a	—N/a
August 24, 2022 (Note: The August 24, 2022 concert in New York City was originally scheduled for May 2, 2020, but was rescheduled due to the COVID-19 pandemic.)	New York City	United States	Madison Square Garden	—N/a	—N/a
September 9, 2022	New York City	United States	Madison Square Garden	—N/a	—N/a
September 23, 2022	Houston	United States	Minute Maid Park	—N/a	—N/a
October 9, 2022	New York City	United States	Madison Square Garden	—N/a	—N/a
November 11, 2022 (Note: The November 11, 2022 concert in Atlanta was part of ATLive.)	Atlanta	United States	Mercedes-Benz Stadium	—N/a	—N/a
November 23, 2022	New York City	United States	Madison Square Garden	—N/a	—N/a
Oceania
December 3, 2022	Auckland	New Zealand	Eden Park	—N/a	—N/a
December 10, 2022	Melbourne	Australia	Melbourne Cricket Ground	76,300 / 76,300	
North America
January 13, 2023	New York City	United States	Madison Square Garden	—N/a	—N/a
January 27, 2023	Hollywood	United States	Hard Rock Live	—N/a	—N/a
February 14, 2023	New York City	United States	Madison Square Garden	17,944 / 17,944	$3,083,458
February 25, 2023	Niagara Falls	Canada	OLG Stage at Fallsview Casino Resort	—N/a	—N/a
March 10, 2023 (Note: Part of "Two Icons, One Night" with Stevie Nicks.)	Inglewood	United States	SoFi Stadium	51,880 / 51,880	$10,884,917
March 26, 2023	New York City	United States	Madison Square Garden	18,501 / 18,501	$3,218,836
April 25, 2023 (Note: The April 25, 2023, concert in New York City was originally scheduled for April 22, but was rescheduled due to a New York Rangers playoff game.)	New York City	United States	Madison Square Garden	—N/a	—N/a
May 5, 2023	New York City	United States	Madison Square Garden	—N/a	—N/a
May 19, 2023	Nashville	United States	Nissan Stadium	—N/a	—N/a
June 2, 2023 (Note: The June 2, 2023 concert in New York City was originally scheduled for December 19, 2022, but was rescheduled due to Billy suffering from a viral infection.)	New York City	United States	Madison Square Garden	—N/a	—N/a
June 16, 2023	Philadelphia	United States	Lincoln Financial Field	—	—
Europe
July 7, 2023 (Note: The July 7, 2023, concert in London is part of BST Hyde Park.)	London	England	Hyde Park	—	—
North America
July 24, 2023	New York City	United States	Madison Square Garden	—	—
August 5, 2023	Columbus	United States	Ohio Stadium	—	—
August 19, 2023	Kansas City	United States	GEHA Field at Arrowhead Stadium	—	—
August 29, 2023	New York City	United States	Madison Square Garden	—	—
September 10, 2023	New York City	United States	Madison Square Garden	—	—
September 23, 2023	Foxborough	United States	Gillette Stadium	—	—
October 7, 2023	Baltimore	United States	M&T Bank Stadium	—	—
October 20, 2023	New York City	United States	Madison Square Garden	—	—
November 10, 2023	Minneapolis	United States	U.S. Bank Stadium	—	—
November 22, 2023	New York City	United States	Madison Square Garden	—	—
December 8, 2023	Phoenix	United States	Chase Field	—	—
December 19, 2023	New York City	United States	Madison Square Garden	—	—
December 31, 2023	Elmont	United States	UBS Arena	—	—
January 11, 2024	New York City	United States	Madison Square Garden	—	—
Asia
January 24, 2024	Tokyo	Japan	Tokyo Dome	—	—
North America
February 9, 2024	New York City	United States	Madison Square Garden	—	—
February 24, 2024 (Note: Part of "One Night, One Stage" with Sting.)	Tampa	United States	Raymond James Stadium	—	—
March 9, 2024 (Note: The March 9, 2024 concert in Arlington with Stevie Nicks was originally scheduled for April 8, 2023, but was rescheduled due to an "ongoing illness within Stevie Nicks' band".)	Arlington	United States	AT&T Stadium	—	—
March 28, 2024	New York City	United States	Madison Square Garden	—	—
April 13, 2024	San Diego	United States	Petco Park	—	—
April 26, 2024	New York City	United States	Madison Square Garden	—	—
May 9, 2024	New York City	United States	Madison Square Garden	—	—
May 24, 2024	Seattle	United States	T-Mobile Park	—	—
June 8, 2024	New York City	United States	Madison Square Garden	—	—
June 21, 2024	Chicago	United States	Soldier Field	—	—
July 12, 2024	Denver	United States	Coors Field	—	—
July 25, 2024	New York City	United States	Madison Square Garden	—	—
Europe
August 9, 2024	Cardiff	Wales	Principality Stadium	—	—
North America
September 13, 2024 (Note: Part of "Together for the First Time Ever" with Rod Stewart.)	Cleveland	United States	Huntington Bank Field	—	—
September 29, 2024 (Note: The September 29, 2024 concert in St. Louis with Sting was originally scheduled for September 27, but was rescheduled due to "inclement weather conditions".)	St. Louis	United States	Busch Stadium	—	—
October 12, 2024	Inglewood	United States	Intuit Dome	—	—
October 25, 2024	San Antonio	United States	Alamodome	—	—
November 9, 2024	Las Vegas	United States	Allegiant Stadium	—	—
November 23, 2024	Hollywood	United States	Hard Rock Live	—	—
December 31, 2024	Elmont	United States	UBS Arena	—	—
February 8, 2025	Indianapolis	United States	Lucas Oil Stadium	—	—
February 22, 2025	Uncasville	United States	Mohegan Sun Arena	—	—

== Cancelled dates ==
Date	City	Country	Venue	Reason
April 26, 2025 (Note: This concert was meant to be a co-headline with Sting.)	Milwaukee	United States	American Family Field	Diagnosis of normal pressure hydrocephalus.
July 5, 2025 (Note: This concert was meant to be a co-headline with Rod Stewart.)	Pittsburgh	United States	Acrisure Stadium	Diagnosis of normal pressure hydrocephalus.
July 18, 2025	The Bronx	United States	Yankee Stadium	Diagnosis of normal pressure hydrocephalus.
August 8, 2025 (Note: This concert was meant to be a co-headline with Stevie Nicks.)	East Rutherford	United States	MetLife Stadium	Diagnosis of normal pressure hydrocephalus.
August 21, 2025	Queens	United States	Citi Field	Diagnosis of normal pressure hydrocephalus.
September 5, 2025	Washington, D.C.	United States	Nationals Park	Diagnosis of normal pressure hydrocephalus.
September 20, 2025	Cincinnati	United States	Paycor Stadium	Diagnosis of normal pressure hydrocephalus.
October 4, 2025	Santa Clara	United States	Levi's Stadium	Diagnosis of normal pressure hydrocephalus.
October 18, 2025	New Orleans	United States	Caesars Superdome	Diagnosis of normal pressure hydrocephalus.
November 1, 2025	Hollywood	United States	Hard Rock Live	Diagnosis of normal pressure hydrocephalus.
November 15, 2025	Detroit	United States	Ford Field	Diagnosis of normal pressure hydrocephalus.
March 14, 2026	Toronto	Canada	Rogers Centre	Diagnosis of normal pressure hydrocephalus.
April 10, 2026	Syracuse	United States	JMA Wireless Dome	Diagnosis of normal pressure hydrocephalus.
May 22, 2026	Salt Lake City	United States	Rice–Eccles Stadium	Diagnosis of normal pressure hydrocephalus.
June 6, 2026	Edinburgh	Scotland	Scottish Gas Murrayfield Edinburgh	Diagnosis of normal pressure hydrocephalus.
June 20, 2026	Liverpool	England	Anfield Stadium	Diagnosis of normal pressure hydrocephalus.
July 3, 2026	Charlotte	United States	Bank of America Stadium	Diagnosis of normal pressure hydrocephalus.

=== Grossing ===
- 2014: $72.2 million from 35 shows
- 2015: $69.9 million from 29 shows
- 2016: $76.6 million from 28 shows
- 2017: $82.3 million from 28 shows
- 2018: $70.3 million from 23 shows
- 2019: $76.9 million from 22 shows
- 2020: $14.8 million from 6 shows
- 2021: $17.4 million from 4 shows

Total available grossing: $480 million from 175 shows.

== See also ==
- List of highest-grossing concert tours
- List of most-attended concert tours
