= Statue of Evander Holyfield =

Statue in Atlanta, Georgia, U.S.

Coordinates: 33°45′24.4″N 84°23′49.2″W

- Statue of Evander Holyfield, 2023
- Interactive map of Statue of Evander Holyfield
- Location: State Farm Arena, Atlanta, Georgia, United States
- Designer: Brian Hanlon
- Material: Bronze
- Height: 9 feet (2.7 m)
- Dedicated date: June 25, 2021
- Dedicated to: Evander Holyfield

The Evander Holyfield statue is a monumental statue of famed professional boxer Evander Holyfield, located in Atlanta, Georgia, United States. The statue was designed by sculptor Brian Hanlon and unveiled in front of State Farm Arena on June 25, 2021.

== History ==
The statue of Evander Holyfield was first announced on November 27, 2017, by Atlanta Mayor Kasim Reed. In a press release issued that day, Reed said that the work, a 9-foot (2.7 m) tall bronze statue designed by sculptor Brian Hanlon, would be located in front of the Flatiron Building in Downtown Atlanta and would "remind viewers of his contributions to the sport of boxing and the City of Atlanta’s proud legacy of athletic achievement." Reed went on to call Holyfield one of the city's "most accomplished residents". Holyfield was raised in Atlanta's Bowen Homes housing project and began boxing at a young age. He accumulated numerous accolades over his professional boxing career, including winning a bronze medal in boxing at the 1984 Summer Olympics and being elected into the International Boxing Hall of Fame in 2017, his first year of eligibility. The $90,000 cost of the statue was part of a $4.4 million investment in public art in Downtown, Midtown, and Southwest Atlanta. The press release stated that the monument would be installed in early 2018.

Despite this expected installation date, an April 2019 article published by Curbed Atlanta pointed out that the statue had not yet been erected, with Hanlon claiming that the sculpture was being held in storage by the city government. In the same article, a representative of Atlanta Mayor Keisha Lance Bottoms said they would look into the matter. Another Curbed article published in November 2019 stated that the statue was no longer going to be installed in Downtown and that instead, the city was working with a neighborhood planning unit to install the statue somewhere in Southwest Atlanta.

Finally, in early 2021, Atlanta Hawks CEO Steve Koonin offered a location in front of State Farm Arena. The Arena sits on the former site of the Omni Coliseum, where Holyfield fought three times. In a ceremony attended by local officials and Holyfield himself, the statue was unveiled on June 25, 2021.
