= Jeff Lynne's ELO Tour 2019 =

2019 concert tour by Jeff Lynne's ELO

- Tour by Jeff Lynne's ELO
- Location: North America
- Start date: June 20, 2019
- End date: August 1, 2019
- Legs: 1
- No. of shows: 20

Jeff Lynne's ELO concert chronology
- Jeff Lynne's ELO Tour 2018 (2018); Jeff Lynne's ELO Tour 2019 (2019); The Over and Out Tour (2024–25)

Jeff Lynne's ELO Tour 2019 was a concert tour by English rock band Jeff Lynne's ELO. It is the group's second tour in North America since 1981, following their tour from the previous year. Dhani Harrison was the opening act for the tour.

== Set list ==
A typical setlist for the tour:

1. "Standin' in the Rain"
2. "Evil Woman"
3. "All Over the World"
4. "Showdown"
5. "Do Ya"
6. "When I Was a Boy"
7. "Livin' Thing"
8. "Handle with Care"
9. "Rockaria!"
10. "Last Train to London"
11. "Xanadu"
12. "10538 Overture"
13. "Shine a Little Love"
14. "Wild West Hero"
15. "Sweet Talkin' Woman"
16. "Telephone Line"
17. "Don't Bring Me Down"
18. "Turn to Stone"
19. "Mr. Blue Sky"

Encore

20. "Roll Over Beethoven"

== Tour dates ==
Date	City	Country	Venue	Attendance	Revenue
North American Tour 2019
June 20, 2019	Anaheim, California	United States	Honda Center	—	—
June 22, 2019	Sacramento, California	United States	Golden 1 Center	—	—
June 24, 2019	San Jose, California	United States	SAP Center	—	—
June 26, 2019	Vancouver, British Columbia	Canada	Rogers Arena	—	—
June 28, 2019	Tacoma, Washington	United States	Tacoma Dome	—	—
June 29, 2019	Portland	United States	Moda Center	—	—
July 3, 2019	Nashville, Tennessee	United States	Bridgestone Arena	—	—
July 5, 2019	Atlanta, Georgia	United States	State Farm Arena	—	—
July 7, 2019	Tampa, Florida	United States	Amalie Arena	—	—
July 9, 2019	Sunrise, Florida	United States	BB&T Center	—	—
July 11, 2019	Washington, D.C.	United States	Capital One Arena	—	—
July 13, 2019	Philadelphia, Pennsylvania	United States	Wells Fargo Center	—	—
July 16, 2019	Newark, New Jersey	United States	Prudential Center	—	—
July 18, 2019	Toronto, Ontario	Canada	Scotiabank Arena	—	—
July 20, 2019	Detroit, Michigan	United States	Little Caesars Arena	—	—
July 23, 2019	Grand Rapids, Michigan	United States	Van Andel Arena	—	—
July 25, 2019	Saint Paul, Minnesota	United States	Xcel Energy Center	—	—
July 27, 2019	Chicago, Illinois	United States	United Center	—	—
July 30, 2019	Columbus, Ohio	United States	Nationwide Arena	—	—
August 1, 2019	Pittsburgh, Pennsylvania	United States	PPG Paints Arena	—	—

== Personnel ==
- Jeff Lynne – vocals, guitar
- Mike Stevens – musical director, guitar, backing vocals, harmonica
- Lee Pomeroy – bass, backing vocals
- Milton McDonald – guitar, backing vocals
- Marcus Byrne – piano, keyboards, vocoder
- Jo Webb – keyboards, guitar, backing vocals
- Steve Turner – keyboards
- Donavan Hepburn – drums
- Melanie Lewis-McDonald – backing vocals
- Iain Hornal – backing and co-lead vocals, guitar, fire extinguisher
- Jessie Murphy – violin
- Amy Langley – cello
- Jess Cox – cello
- Dhani Harrison – vocals, guitar (Handle With Care only)
