= Statue of Dominique Wilkins =

Statue in Atlanta, Georgia, U.S.

Dominique Wilkins statue
- The statue in 2023
- Interactive map of Dominique Wilkins statue
- Location: State Farm Arena, Atlanta, Georgia, United States
- Coordinates: 33°45′23.5″N 84°23′46″W
- Designer: Brian Hanlon
- Type: Statue
- Material: Bronze; Granite
- Height: 13 feet 6 inches (4.11 m)
- Weight: 18,500 pounds (8,400 kg)
- Dedicated date: March 2, 2015
- Inauguration date: March 3, 2015
- Dedicated to: Dominique Wilkins

A statue of Dominique Wilkins stands outside the main entrance of State Farm Arena in Atlanta, Georgia, United States. The monument was designed by sculptor Brian Hanlon and depicts Wilkins, a former basketball player who spent several seasons with the Atlanta Hawks of the National Basketball Association, as he is about to perform a slam dunk. The statue was dedicated on March 2, 2015, during a private ceremony at the arena, which is the home venue for the Hawks. It was publicly installed outside the arena the following day.

== History ==
=== Background ===
Dominique Wilkins is a former professional basketball player who, from 1982 to 1994, played for the Atlanta Hawks of the National Basketball Association (NBA). By the time his playing career had ended, Wilkins was a nine-time NBA All-Star and had won the 1985 and 1990 Slam Dunk Contests, earning him the nickname "The Human Highlight Film". He was inducted into the Naismith Memorial Basketball Hall of Fame in 2006, and, according to sports journalist Mark Bradley of The Atlanta Journal-Constitution, he "is among the handful of greatest professional players this city has known, and he has no challengers as the all-time best Atlanta Hawk". As of 2015, he was one of the NBA's all-time career scorers, in addition to being Atlanta's all-time scorer, and was the vice president of the Hawks franchise. Since 2001, his No. 21 has been retired by the Hawks.

=== Creation and dedication ===
The idea for a monument honoring Wilkins was developed by Atlanta civic leader Thomas Dortch and sculptor Brian Hanlon, who is the official sculptor for the Naismith Memorial Basketball Hall of Fame. The Hawks organization became involved in the project around 2012. Speaking about the statue, Hanlon stated that he wanted to honor Wilkins's contributions to both the team and to the city of Atlanta. Hanlon completed the project in about seven months.

In September 2014, the Hawks announced the statue would be unveiled the following year as part of the 15th anniversary celebrations for Philips Arena, their home arena. On March 2, 2015, the statue was unveiled in a private ceremony at the arena. Guests in attendance included Wilkins, NBA Commissioner Adam Silver, the current Hawks players and coaches, and several former players from Wilkins's era, including Charles Barkley, Clyde Drexler, Julius Erving, Bernard King, Karl Malone, and Dikembe Mutombo. Hanlon was unable to attend the ceremony due to a surgery. Speeches in honor of Wilkins were made by several present, including Silver and Erving, while former player Larry Bird spoke via video message, poking fun at Wilkins's abilities by saying, "Congratulations on that statue. I'm pretty sure it wasn't made with you in a defensive stance". Also as part of the celebrations, a section of Centennial Olympic Park Drive from Marietta Street to Martin Luther King Jr. Drive in downtown Atlanta was renamed Dominique Wilkins Lane. A day after the dedication ceremony, the statue was officially unveiled to the public and erected outside the arena, near the main entrance. With this, Wilkins became one of only eleven NBA players to have a statue honoring them erected at an NBA venue.

== Design ==
The statue is made of bronze and stands upon a granite pedestal. It stands 13.5 feet (4.1 m) tall and weighs 18,500 pounds (8,400 kg). According to Hanlon, he consulted with Wilkins on the overall design of the statue and eventually settled on what he called the "anticipation of the dunk", depicting Wilkins in the process of initiating a slam dunk. Wilkins is wearing short shorts and a pair of Reebok shoes and sports his signature flattop hair style. It is located near the main entrance of the Atlanta Hawks' venue, which is now known as State Farm Arena.
