= Face to Face 2010 =

2010 concert tour by Elton John and Billy Joel

- National tour by Elton John and Billy Joel
- Tour poster
- Location: U.S., North America
- Start date: 3 February 2010
- End date: 11 March 2010
- Legs: 1
- No. of shows: 12
Elton John tour chronology
- Face to Face 2009
- (2009)
- Face to Face 2010
- (2010)
- 2010 European Tour
- (2010)
Billy Joel tour chronology
- Face to Face 2009
- (2009)
- Face to Face 2010
- (2010)
- Billy Joel in Concert
- (2014–25)

In early February 2010, Elton John and Billy Joel set out on another leg of their concert series Face to Face. Most of these shows had been rescheduled from the year before when John had contracted E. coli, forcing the pair to cancel the concerts planned for the fall of 2009. Joel had also fallen unwell at the time of the gigs the previous year.

Despite several outlets reporting four summer concerts in Chicago, Pittsburgh and Boston, Joel denied rumours in the trade press announcing that he cancelled a summer 2010 leg of the tour, saying that those concerts were never booked in the first place and that he intended to take the year off from performing and music. Joel told Rolling Stone magazine: "We'll probably pick it up again. It's always fun playing with him."

Joel stated in 2012 that he would no longer tour with John because it restrained his setlists. (Note: JoyceKane (2012-03-03). "Billy Joel Won't Tour with Elton due to Setlist Constraints". EltonDaily.com.)

== Tour dates ==
| Date | City | Country | Venue | Tickets Sold/Available | Box Office |
|---|---|---|---|---|---|
North America
| 3 February 2010 | Seattle | United States | KeyArena | 27,605 / 27,605 (100%) | $3,779,949 |
| 6 February 2010 | Seattle | United States | KeyArena | 27,605 / 27,605 (100%) | $3,779,949 |
| 10 February 2010 | Portland | United States | Rose Garden | 15,440 / 15,440 (100%) | $1,879,099 |
| 13 February 2010 | Oakland | United States | Oracle Arena | 16,902 / 16,902 (100%) | $2,045,887 |
| 16 February 2010 | San Jose | United States | HP Pavilion at San Jose | 15,909 / 15,909 (100%) | $1,861,681 |
| 19 February 2010 | Salt Lake City | United States | EnergySolutions Arena | 16,057 / 16,057 (100%) | $1,729,539 |
| 22 February 2010 | Denver | United States | Pepsi Center | 15,470 / 15,470 (100%) | $1,790,533 |
| 25 February 2010 | Oklahoma City | United States | Oklahoma City Arena | 12,668 / 12,668 (100%) | $1,378,170 |
| 27 February 2010 | Kansas City | United States | Sprint Center | 17,682 / 17,682 (100%) | $2,112,261 |
| 3 March 2010 | Wichita | United States | Intrust Bank Arena | 14,029 / 14,029 (100%) | $1,706,428 |
| 9 March 2010 | Buffalo | United States | HSBC Arena | 17,691 / 17,691 (100%) | $1,824,428 |
| 11 March 2010 | Albany | United States | Times Union Center | 13,874 / 13,874 (100%) | $1,623,929 |

Cancellations and rescheduled shows

| 7 July 2010 | Chicago | Wrigley Field | Cancelled (Note: "Summer concert with Billy Joel at Wrigley is cancelled". eltonfan.net. 2010-02-20.) |
| 14 July 2010 | Pittsburgh, Pennsylvania | PNC Park | Cancelled (Note: "Billy dismisses rumors he yanked tour with Elton". eltonfan.net. 2010-02-27.) |
| 21 July 2010 | Boston, Massachusetts | Fenway Park | Cancelled |
| 24 July 2010 | Boston, Massachusetts | Fenway Park | Cancelled |

== Setlist ==
Standard setlist

Elton John & Billy Joel & Bands

1. Your Song
2. Just the Way You Are
3. Don't Let the Sun Go Down on Me
4. My Life

Elton John & Band

1. Funeral for a Friend/Love Lies Bleeding
2. Saturday Night's Alright for Fighting
3. Levon
4. Madman Across the Water
5. Tiny Dancer
6. Goodbye Yellow Brick Road
7. Daniel
8. Rocket Man
9. Philadelphia Freedom
10. I'm Still Standing
11. Crocodile Rock

Billy Joel & Band

1. Prelude/Angry Young Man
2. Movin' Out
3. Allentown
4. Zanzibar
5. Don't Ask Me Why
6. She's Always a Woman
7. Scenes from an Italian Restaurant
8. River of Dreams
9. We Didn't Start the Fire
10. It's Still Rock and Roll to Me
11. Only the Good Die Young

Elton John & Billy Joel & Bands

1. I Guess That's Why They Call It the Blues
2. Uptown Girl
3. The Bitch is Back
4. You May Be Right
5. Bennie and the Jets
6. Candle in the Wind
7. Piano Man
