= State Farm Arena =

Arena located in Atlanta, Georgia, U.S.

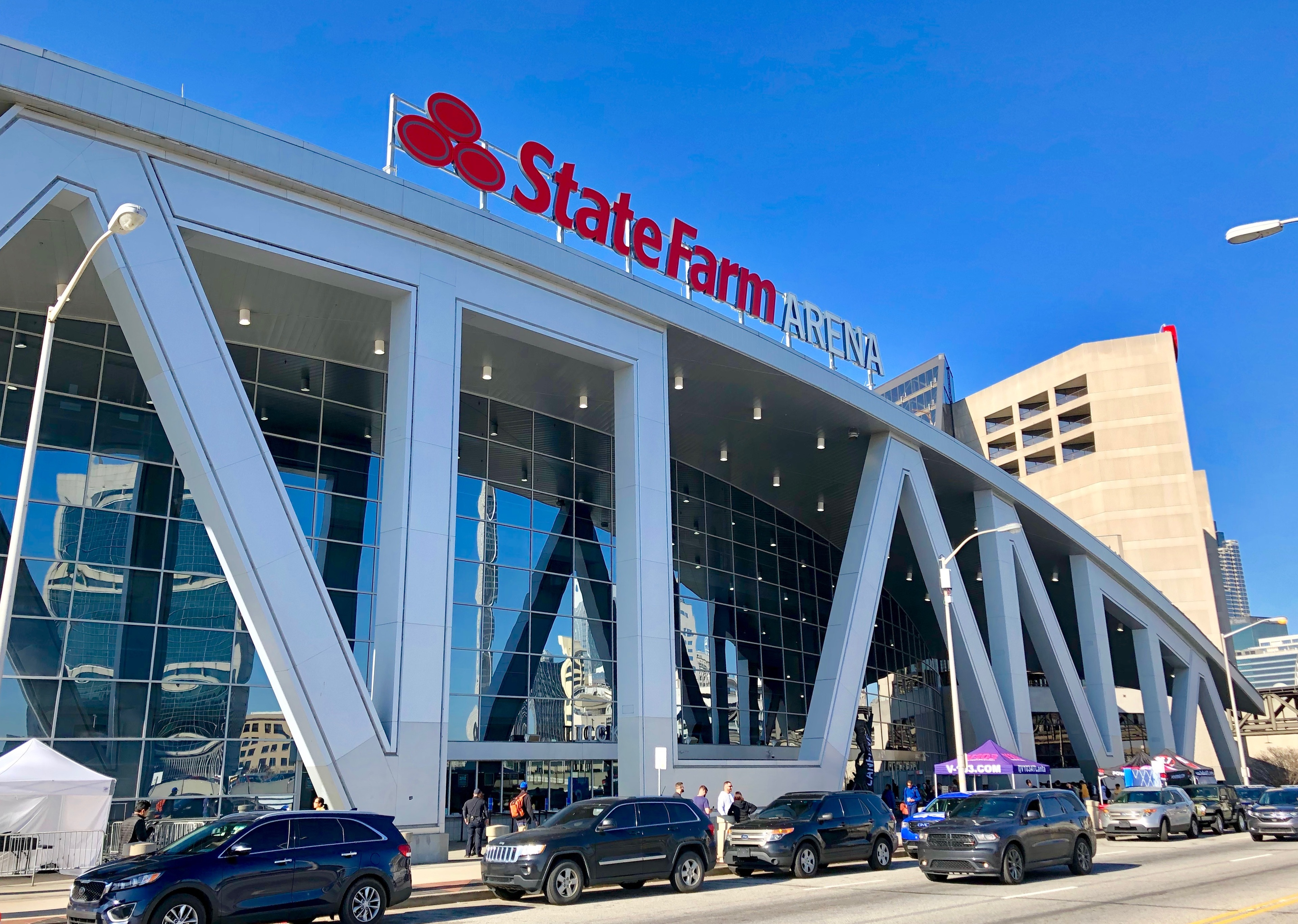
- State Farm Arena in 2019

- Location in Atlanta Location in the Atlanta metro area Location in Georgia Location in the United States
- Former names: Philips Arena (1999–2018)
- Address: 1 State Farm Drive
- Location: Atlanta, Georgia, U.S.
- Coordinates: 33°45′26″N 84°23′47″W
- Owner: Atlanta Fulton County Recreation Authority
- Operator: Atlanta Hawks
- Capacity: Basketball: 20,233 (1999–2005); 18,729 (2005–2011); 18,371 (2011–2012); 18,238 (2012–2013), 18,118 (2013–2014), 18,047 (2014–2017); 15,711 (2017–2018); 17,608+ (2018–present); Ice hockey: 18,545 (1999–2010); 17,624 (2010–2011); Concerts: 18,000
- Field size: 680,000 sq ft (63,000 m^{2})
- Public transit: MARTA Green Line Blue Line at SEC District Red Line Gold Line at Peachtree Center

Construction
- Groundbreaking: June 5, 1997
- Opened: September 18, 1999
- Renovated: 2017–2018
- Cost: $213.5 million ($413 million in 2025 dollars) Renovations (2017-2018): $192.5 million ($247 million in 2025 dollars)
- Architects: Populous (then HOK Sport); Arquitectonica (Expansion)
- Project manager: Barton Malow
- Structural engineer: Thornton Tomasetti
- Services engineers: M-E Engineers, Inc.
- General contractors: Atlanta Arena Constructors (AAC), a joint venture of Beers Construction Co., Holder Construction Co., H.J. Russell & Co. and C.D. Moody Construction Co.

Tenants
- Atlanta Hawks (NBA) (1999–present); Atlanta Thrashers (NHL) (1999–2011); Georgia Force (AFL) (2002, 2005–2007); Atlanta Dream (WNBA) (2008–2016, 2019, 2027–present)

Website
- statefarmarena.com

State Farm Arena is an indoor arena located in Atlanta, Georgia, United States. The arena serves as the home venue for the Atlanta Hawks of the National Basketball Association (NBA). It also served as home to the Atlanta Thrashers of the National Hockey League (NHL) from 1999 to 2011, before the team moved to Winnipeg and was renamed to the Winnipeg Jets, as well as the Atlanta Dream of the Women's National Basketball Association (WNBA) from 2008 to 2016 and 2019, and the temporary home of Georgia Tech basketball in 2011. It opened in 1999 as Philips Arena at a cost of $213.5 million, replacing Omni Coliseum. It is owned by the Atlanta Fulton County Recreation Authority and operated by the Hawks, owned by Tony Ressler along with a group of investors including Grant Hill.

== Layout ==
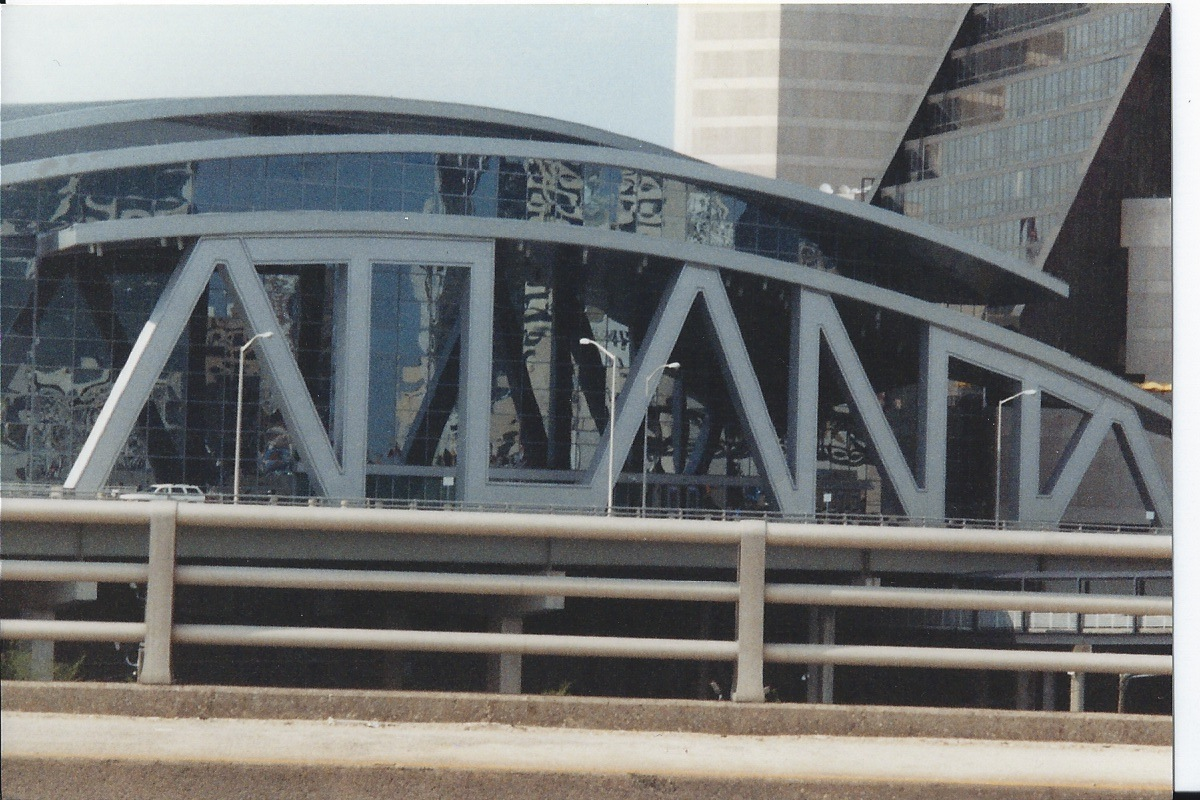
Then-Philips Arena on February 12, 2012.

The arena seats 17,608 for basketball and 18,000+ for concerts. The largest crowd ever for an Atlanta Hawks basketball game at the arena was Game 6 of the 2008 Eastern Conference First Round on May 2, 2008 (against the Boston Celtics), where there was an announced attendance of 20,425. The arena includes 92 luxury suites, 9 party suites, and 1,866 club seats. For concerts and other entertainment events, the arena can seat 21,000.

The arena was originally laid out in a rather unusual manner, with the club seats and luxury boxes aligned solely along one side of the playing surface, and the general admission seating along the other three sides (the arrangement was later emulated in Ford Field, Addition Financial Arena, Soldier Field, Levi's Stadium, and other venues). This layout was a vast contrast to many of its contemporaries, which have their revenue-generating luxury boxes and club seats located in the 'belly' of the arena, thus causing the upper deck to be 2–4 stories higher. The layout at Philips was done so as to be able to bring the bulk of the seats closer to the playing surface while still making available a sufficient number of revenue-raising club seats and loges. Renovations in 2017–18 removed the upper levels of the suite wall in favor of premium seating spread throughout the arena, turning those upper areas to standard seating.

On the exterior, angled steel columns supporting the roof facing downtown spell out "ATLANTA." The side facing the Georgia World Congress Center originally spelled out "CNN" (whose headquarters adjoins the arena), but that section has since been altered to accommodate a Taco Mac restaurant. The SEC District rail station below the arena provides access to MARTA public transportation.

Eindhoven, Netherlands-based technology company Philips purchased the initial naming rights to the arena in February 1999 for $185 million over 20 years. In February 2018, it was reported that Philips would not renew its naming rights agreement for the arena when it expired in June 2019, primarily due to Philips' withdrawal from the consumer electronics market in 2013. On August 29, 2018, State Farm purchased the naming rights to the arena, in a 20-year deal that cost $175 million.

For the 2007–2008 season, State Farm Arena utilized the new "see-through" shot clock units which allow spectators seated behind the basket to see the action without having the clocks interfere with their view, joining FedExForum, Wells Fargo Center, TD Garden, United Center, Footprint Center and the Spectrum Center. Video advertising panels replaced the traditional scrolling panels.

== Banners ==
=== Atlanta Hawks ===
Title banners

- 1958 NBA championship
- 1970 Western Division Champions
- 1980, 1987, 1994 Central Division Champions
- 2015, 2021, 2026 Southeast Division Champions

Atlanta Hawks retired numbers
No.	Player	Position	Tenure
9	Bob Pettit	F	1954–1965
21	Dominique Wilkins	F	1982–1994
23	Lou Hudson	F, G	1966–1977
44	'Pistol' Pete Maravich	SG	1970–1973
55	Dikembe Mutombo	C	1996–2001
59	Kasim Reed	Mayor of Atlanta	2010–2018
—	Ted Turner	Owner	1977–2001

=== Atlanta Dream ===
- 2010, 2011, 2013 Eastern Conference Champions

=== Atlanta Thrashers (1999–2011) ===
- 2006–07 Southeast Division Champions

== History ==
Logo as Philips Arena, 1999–2018

During the late 1980s and early 1990s, many cities started building new state-of-the-art sporting venues for their NBA and/or NHL franchises, or in hopes of attaining one. Many of these arenas had modern amenities for their high-end customers, such as luxury boxes, club seats, and large, posh club-level concourses; some even had practice facilities on-site. These attractions were rarely found in arenas constructed in the early 1970s, when the Omni Coliseum was built. However, it was likely that the Omni would have had to be replaced in any event due to a serious design flaw. It had been built using Cor-Ten weathering steel that was intended to seal itself, ensuring it would last for decades. However, the Omni's designers didn't account for Atlanta's humid subtropical climate. Rather than form a seal, the Cor-Ten steel never stopped rusting, causing the arena to deteriorate faster than anticipated.

Ted Turner, owner of the Hawks at the time, wanted to bring the NHL back to Atlanta; the city's first NHL team, the Atlanta Flames, had moved to Calgary in 1980. However, the NHL determined that the Omni was not suitable even as a temporary facility due to its structural problems and lack of amenities. The league told Turner that it would only grant an expansion team on condition that a new arena be in place for the prospective team's inaugural season. After much consideration of possible other sites both in Downtown Atlanta and in the suburbs, it was decided that the Omni would be demolished in 1997, and a new arena would be built in the same location; the Omni was demolished on July 26, 1997. The Hawks split their games between the Georgia Dome and Alexander Memorial Coliseum for the next two seasons while Philips Arena was under construction.

Philips Arena held its first event with a September 1999 concert by musician Elton John. The Omni's "center-hung scoreboard" now hangs in the lobby of Philips Arena, where it still displays the Omni's logo along with those of Philips Arena, the Hawks, and the Thrashers (who never played in The Omni). The scoreboard still functions and displays information relevant to the game taking place in the arena. On April 2, 2009, Philips Arena achieved LEED for Existing Building: Operations and Maintenance certification as specified by the United States Green Building Council (USGBC). It was the world's first LEED certified NBA/NHL arena. It has been nicknamed the "Highlight Factory", due to the number of exciting plays, or highlights, that occur and Philips' history with lights and electronics.

On March 14, 2008, an EF2 Tornado struck near the Arena as part of a tornado outbreak that hit the city. The arena only received minor exterior damage. Since the 2010s, several statues have been erected near the arena in honor of notable Atlantan athletes, including a statue of Dominique Wilkins and a statue of Evander Holyfield.

== Events ==
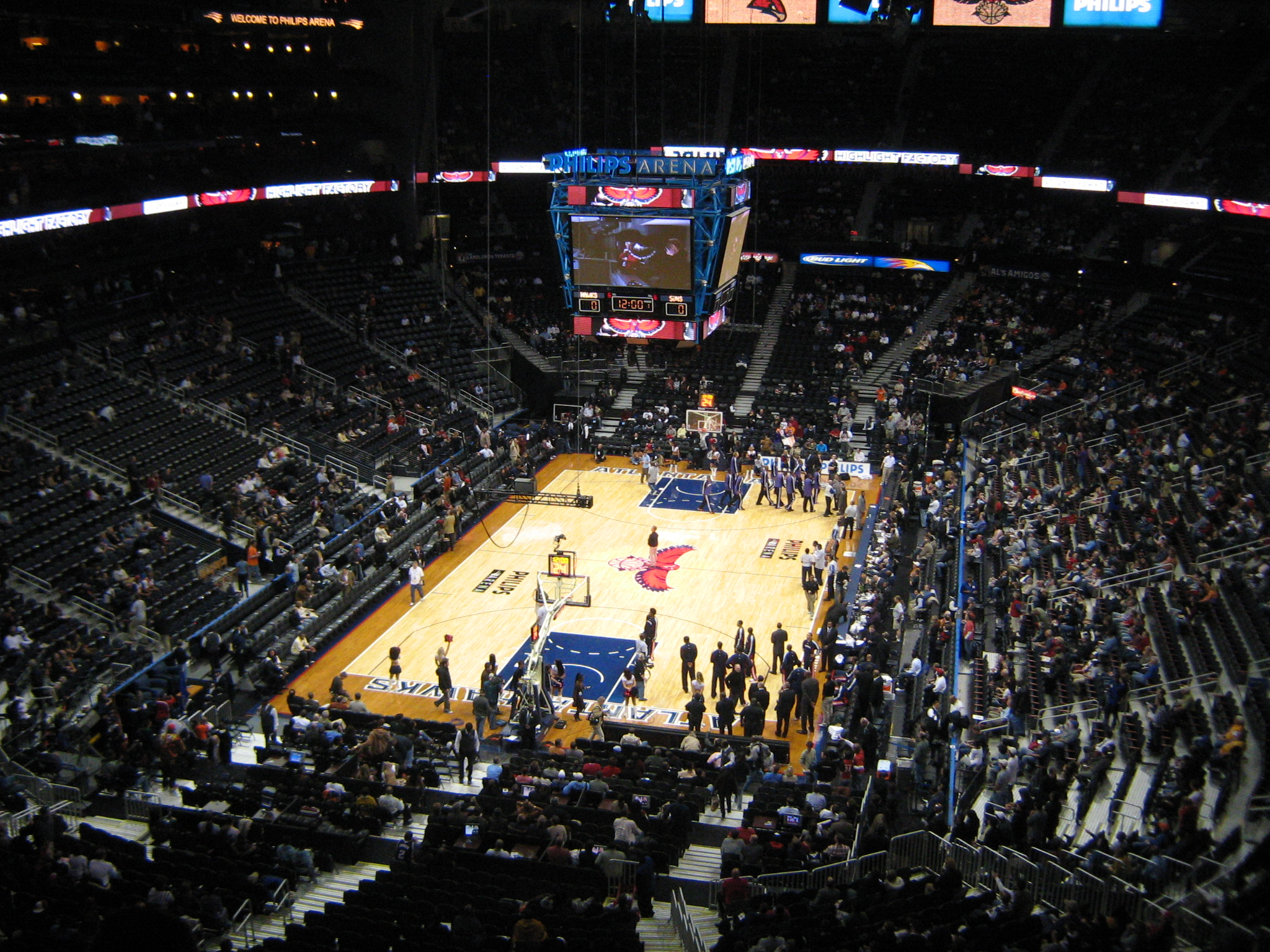
Then-Philips Arena prior to a Hawks game vs the Phoenix Suns

The arena hosted the NBA All-Star Game in 2003 and 2021 and the Atlantic Coast Conference men's basketball tournament in 2012. It also hosted the NHL All-Star Game in 2008.

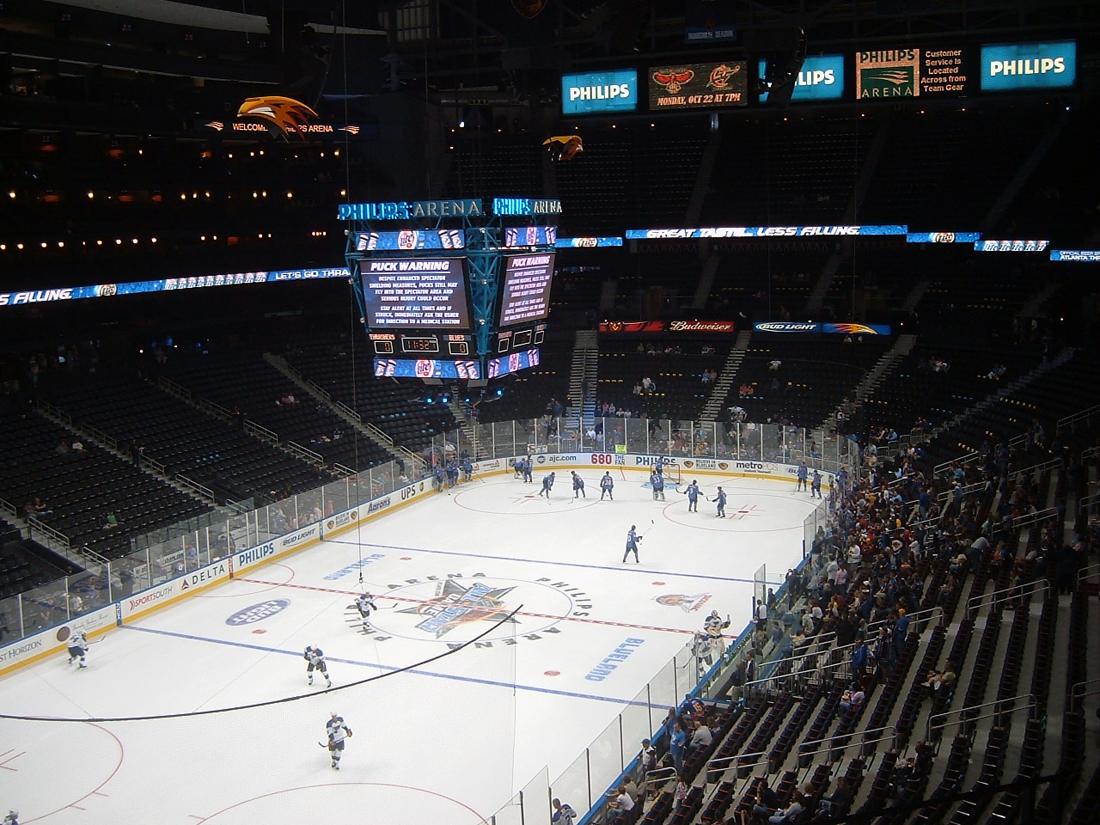
A Thrashers game in 2007.

The first playoff game in any professional league played in Philips Arena was in 2005, when the Georgia Force of the Arena Football League hosted, and won, its first home playoff game. The first NHL playoff game in Philips Arena was in 2007, the Thrashers' only appearance in the Stanley Cup Playoffs. The first NBA playoff game in Philips Arena was in 2008, when the Hawks made the 2008 NBA Playoffs after an eight-season drought of missing the playoffs. On April 10, 2011, the Thrashers lost to the Pittsburgh Penguins, 5–2, in their final game. Tim Stapleton scored the final goal for the Thrashers in team history.

The venue had been named the site of the 2005 Southeastern Conference Women's Basketball Tournament; however, when the NHL announced in early 2004 that the 55th NHL All-Star Game, scheduled for February 2005 would be held in Atlanta, arena officials withdrew the Southeastern Conference women's basketball tournament – which was then moved 140 miles to the northeast along Interstate 85 to the BI-LO Center in Greenville, South Carolina. Oddly, the arena would not even be the host of that planned All-Star Game due to the 2004–05 NHL lockout. As a result, Atlanta became the second (San Jose being the first) city to lose a planned All-Star Game because of a labor dispute. Philips Arena would later be announced as home to the 56th NHL All-Star Game in 2008. Also, Philips Arena hosted game three of the 2010 WNBA Finals, where the Seattle Storm defeated the Atlanta Dream.

In 2013, Philips Arena hosted the finals of the men's NCAA Division II and Division III college basketball championships. The events were held as an undercard to the 2013 NCAA Final Four held at the Georgia Dome, in celebration of the 75th edition of the NCAA Men's Division I Basketball Championship.

On May 22, 2025, State Farm Arena hosted the WNBA's Atlanta Dream vs the Indiana Fever.

=== MMA and Wrestling ===
The arena hosted UFC 88: Breakthrough, UFC 145: Jones vs. Evans, UFC 201: Lawler vs. Woodley, UFC 236: Holloway vs. Poirier 2 and UFC on ESPN: Usman vs. Buckley in 2008, 2012, 2016, 2019 and 2025 respectively.

State Farm Arena also hosted the 2011 WWE Hall of Fame induction ceremony, the night before WrestleMania XXVII which was held at the Georgia Dome. The arena also hosted the Royal Rumble in 2002 and 2010, Backlash in 2007, Hell in a Cell in 2012, Survivor Series in 2015, Day 1 in 2022, WWE Bad Blood in 2024, and Evolution 2025.

An edition of WCW Monday Nitro was also held when the arena was known as Philips Arena on June 5, 2000. The arena hosted the February 19, 2020 episode of AEW Dynamite featuring All Elite Wrestling's first-ever Steel cage match.

=== Concerts ===
State Farm Arena is among the busiest arenas for concerts in the world, having sold well over 550,000 concert tickets in 2007 and ranked as the third-busiest arena in the U.S. in 2011. State Farm has hosted such concerts as Elton John, The Who, and The Weeknd.

Date	Artist	Opening act(s)	Tour / Concert name	Attendance	Revenue	Notes
September 24, 1999	Elton John	—	Medusa Tour	18,919 / 18,919	$966,802	The first event held at the arena.
September 26, 1999	Cher	Cyndi Lauper; Julio Iglesias Jr.	Do You Believe?	10,982 / 15,914	$585,996	
September 28, 1999	ZZ Top	Lynyrd Skynyrd; Screamin' Cheetah Wheelies	XXX Tour	—	—	
October 24, 1999	Ricky Martin	Jessica Simpson	Livin' la Vida Loca Tour	14,042 / 14,042	$865,596	
November 18, 1999	Shania Twain	Shane Minor	Come On Over Tour	—	—	
November 24, 1999	Backstreet Boys	—	Into the Millennium Tour	—	—	
December 9, 1999	Rage Against the Machine	Gang Starr; Anti-Flag	The Battle of Los Angeles Tour	—	—	
January 29, 2000	TLC	Blaque; Christina Aguilera	FanMail Tour	—	—	This concert was filmed for a PayPerView special, TLC: Sold Out. Goodie Mob made a special appearance to perform their song, "What it Ain't".
April 1, 2000	Mariah Carey	—	Rainbow World Tour	12,956 / 12,956	$664,229	
April 12, 2000	Tina Turner	Lionel Richie; Janice Robinson	Twenty Four Seven Tour	—	—	
April 13, 2000	Korn	Mindless Self Indulgence; Staind	Sick and Twisted Tour	—	—	
April 15, 2000	Kiss	Ted Nugent; Skid Row	Kiss Farewell Tour	14,495 / 14,495	—	
April 29, 2000	Elton John	—	Medusa Tour	—	—	
May 18, 2000	NSYNC	P!nk; Sisqo	No Strings Attached Tour	27,018 / 27,018	$1,272,461	
May 19, 2000	NSYNC	P!nk; Sisqo	No Strings Attached Tour	27,018 / 27,018	$1,272,461	
June 3, 2000	Bruce Springsteen and the E Street Band	—	Bruce Springsteen and the E Street Band Reunion Tour	36,122 / 36,122	$2,204,866	During the second show, band performed American Skin for the first time ever
June 4, 2000	Bruce Springsteen and the E Street Band	—	Bruce Springsteen and the E Street Band Reunion Tour	36,122 / 36,122	$2,204,866	During the second show, band performed American Skin for the first time ever
June 22, 2000	Diana Ross and the Supremes	—	Return to Love Tour	—	—	
July 10, 2000	Ricky Martin	—	Livin' la Vida Loca Tour	—	—	
July 12, 2000	Tim McGraw; Faith Hill	Keith Urban	Soul2Soul Tour	—	—	
August 7, 2000	Pearl Jam	Sonic Youth	Binaural Tour	—	—	This concert was recorded for the album 8/7/00 – Atlanta, Georgia.
August 17, 2000	AC/DC	Slash's Snakepit	Stiff Upper Lip World Tour	—	—	
August 27, 2000	Dixie Chicks	—	Fly Tour	—	—	
September 28, 2000	The Who	—	The Who Tour 2000	—	—	
October 14, 2000	Tina Turner	Joe Cocker	Twenty Four Seven Tour	—	—	
October 21, 2000	NSYNC	Meredith Edwards	No Strings Attached Tour	—	—	
March 30, 2001	U2	Nelly Furtado	Elevation Tour	20,596 / 20,596	$1,500,277	
April 24, 2001	Elton John; Billy Joel	—	Face to Face 2001	19,892 / 19,892	$1,990,010	
May 11, 2001	Bon Jovi	—	One Wild Night Tour	—	—	
June 11, 2001	Backstreet Boys	Myra; Krystal Harris; Shaggy	Black & Blue Tour	—	—	
July 28, 2001	3LW; Dream; Jessica Simpson; Eve; Nelly and the St. Lunatics; Destiny's Child	—	Total Request Live Tour	—	—	
August 19, 2001	Madonna	—	Drowned World Tour	29,617 / 29,617	$3,553,444	
August 20, 2001	Madonna	—	Drowned World Tour	29,617 / 29,617	$3,553,444	
August 27, 2001	Sade	—	Lovers Rock Tour	—	—	
September 8, 2001	Janet Jackson	112	All for You Tour	14,681 / 15,584	$852,683	
October 31, 2001	Stone Temple Pilots	Linkin Park; Puddle of Mudd; Staind; Static-X; Deadsy; Spike 1000	Family Values Tour	—	—	
November 5, 2001	Jimmy Buffett	—	2001: A Beach Odyssey Tour	—	—	
November 30, 2001	U2	Garbage	Elevation Tour	18,535 / 18,535	$1,504,925	
December 15, 2001	Britney Spears	—	Dream Within a Dream Tour	15,535 / 15,535	$849,362	
February 9, 2002	Bob Dylan	—	Never Ending Tour 2002	—	—	
March 25, 2002	Santana	—	All is One Tour	—	—	
May 12, 2002	Paul McCartney	—	Driving World Tour	28,810 / 28,810	$3,476,918	
May 13, 2002	Paul McCartney	—	Driving World Tour	28,810 / 28,810	$3,476,918	
August 27, 2002	Cher	—	Living Proof: The Farewell Tour	13,848 / 13,848	$944,256	
September 17, 2002	Billy Joel; Elton John	—	Face to Face 2002	19,409 / 19,409	$2,025,750	
October 13, 2002	Rush	—	Vapor Trails Tour	—	—	
October 21, 2002	American Idols LIVE! Tour 2002			94.1%	—	
December 2, 2002	Bruce Springsteen and the E Street Band	—	The Rising Tour	17,408 / 17,408	$1,211,256	
December 11, 2002	Dave Matthews Band	Jason Mraz	2002 Fall Tour	—	—	
February 1, 2003	Jimmy Buffett	—	Far Side of the World Tour	—	—	
February 13, 2003	Bon Jovi	Goo Goo Dolls	Bounce Tour	15,781 / 15,781	$823,609	
April 25, 2003	Cher	Tommy Drake	Living Proof: The Farewell Tour	12,847 / 14,130	$872,885	
June 3, 2003	Fleetwood Mac	—	Say You Will Tour	12,656 / 12,656	$1,108,443	
July 12, 2003	Justin Timberlake; Christina Aguilera	The Black Eyed Peas	Justified and Stripped Tour	—	—	
August 3, 2003	Dixie Chicks	Michelle Branch	Top of the World Tour	17,101 / 17,101	$1,001,135	
January 25, 2004	Bette Midler	—	Kiss My Brass	11,303 / 12,757	$965,079	
March 23, 2004	Britney Spears	Kelis; Skye Sweetnam	The Onyx Hotel Tour	12,456 / 14,144	$793,814	
March 28, 2004	Beyoncé; Alicia Keys; Missy Elliott	Tamia	Verizon Ladies First Tour	12,310 / 12,310	$845,693	
April 9, 2004	Aerosmith	Cheap Trick	Honkin' on Bobo Tour	—	—	
April 23, 2004	Shania Twain	Emerson Drive	Up! Tour	15,779 / 17,992	$954,666	
April 28, 2004	Yes	—	35th Anniversary Tour	—	—	
April 30, 2004	Prince	The Time	Musicology Live 2004ever	17,977 / 17,977	$1,168,393	
July 24, 2004	Madonna	—	Re-Invention World Tour	25,627 / 25,627	$3,450,874	
July 25, 2004	Madonna	—	Re-Invention World Tour	25,627 / 25,627	$3,450,874	
August 9, 2004	Prince	The Time	Musicology Live 2004ever	33,214 / 33,214	$2,031,926	
August 10, 2004	Prince	The Time	Musicology Live 2004ever	33,214 / 33,214	$2,031,926	
August 15, 2004	American Idols LIVE! Tour 2004			—	—	
September 17, 2004	Van Halen	Laidlaw	Summer Tour 2004	—	—	
October 28, 2004	Avril Lavigne	Butch Walker	Bonez Tour	—	—	
November 14, 2004	Sarah Brightman	—	Harem World Tour	—	—	
July 15, 2005	Destiny's Child	—	Destiny Fulfilled... and Lovin' It	12,972 / 12,972	$1,256,284	This concert was filmed for the DVD, Live in Atlanta.
July 16, 2005	Kenny Chesney	Gretchen Wilson; Uncle Kracker; Pat Green	Somewhere in the Sun Tour	—	—	
July 17, 2005	Kenny Chesney	Gretchen Wilson; Uncle Kracker; Pat Green	Somewhere in the Sun Tour	—	—	
July 18, 2005	Kenny Chesney	Gretchen Wilson; Uncle Kracker; Pat Green	Somewhere in the Sun Tour	—	—	
July 23, 2005	Bruce Springsteen	—	Devils & Dust Tour	6,541 / 10,597	$419,055	
August 23, 2005	Green Day	My Chemical Romance; Simple Plan; Jimmy Eat World; Against Me!	American Idiot World Tour	—	—	
September 20, 2005	Paul McCartney	—	The 'US' Tour	14,096 / 14,096	$1,930,941	
September 28, 2005	Coldplay	Rilo Kiley	Twisted Logic Tour	14,557 / 14,557	$752,540	
October 1, 2005	Elton John	—	Peachtree Road Tour	15,605 / 15,605	$1,335,525	
October 15, 2005	The Rolling Stones	Wilco	A Bigger Bang	—	—	
October 27, 2005	Nine Inch Nails	Queens of the Stone Age; Death from Above 1979	Live: With Teeth Tour	—	—	
November 18, 2005	U2	Institute	Vertigo Tour	36,334 / 36,334	$3,500,572	
November 19, 2005	U2	Institute	Vertigo Tour	36,334 / 36,334	$3,500,572	
January 15, 2006	Aerosmith	Lenny Kravitz	Rockin' the Joint Tour	—	—	
January 17, 2006	Bon Jovi	—	Have a Nice Day Tour	14,262 / 14,262	$1,095,715	
February 8, 2006	The Rolling Stones	Soulive	A Bigger Bang	—	—	
July 8, 2006	Tim McGraw; Faith Hill	—	Soul2Soul II Tour	—	—	
August 9, 2006	Mariah Carey	—	The Adventures of Mimi	11,226 / 13,288	$660,595	
September 12, 2006	Shakira	—	Oral Fixation Tour	11,986 / 11,986	$787,197	
November 2, 2006	Barbra Streisand	—	Streisand	14,538 / 14,538	$3,855,784	
November 4, 2006	Def Leppard; Journey	Stoll Vaughan	Yeah! Tour	—	—	
December 2, 2006	Dixie Chicks	Pete Yorn	Accidents & Accusations Tour	—	—	This show was originally scheduled for October 17, but was rescheduled for Melbourne show.
December 18, 2006	The Killers	—	Sam's Town Tour	—	—	This concert was a part of "99X Mistletoe Jam".
February 27, 2007	Justin Timberlake	P!nk	FutureSex/LoveShow	16,638 / 16,638	$1,129,984	T.I. was the special guest.
March 17, 2007	Josh Groban	Angelique Kidjo	Awake Tour	—	—	
April 25, 2007	Jimmy Buffett	—	The Bama Breeze Tour	—	—	
May 22, 2007	Roger Waters	—	The Dark Side of the Moon Live	12,204 / 13,525	$1,158,623	
July 20, 2007	Beyoncé	Robin Thicke	The Beyoncé Experience	—	—	
July 21, 2007	Tim McGraw; Faith Hill	—	Soul2Soul 2007	—	—	
November 17, 2007	The Police	Fiction Plane	The Police Reunion Tour	27,665 / 27,665	$3,249,155	
November 18, 2007	The Police	Fiction Plane	The Police Reunion Tour	27,665 / 27,665	$3,249,155	
February 10, 2008	Van Halen	—	Van Halen 2007–2008 Tour	—	—	
April 18, 2008	Avril Lavigne	Boys Like Girls	The Best Damn Tour	6,016 / 8,347	$171,294	
April 25, 2008	Bruce Springsteen and the E Street Band	—	Magic Tour	17,630 / 17,630	$1,666,489	
April 30, 2008	Bon Jovi	Daughtry	Lost Highway Tour	32,964 / 32,964	$2,851,856	
May 1, 2008	Bon Jovi	Daughtry	Lost Highway Tour	32,964 / 32,964	$2,851,856	
May 28, 2008	Alicia Keys	—	As I Am Tour	—	—	
July 31, 2008	George Michael	—	25 Live	—	—	
October 19, 2008	Janet Jackson	—	Rock Witchu Tour	7,503 / 9,698	$665,775	
November 5, 2008	Coldplay	Snow Patrol	Viva la Vida Tour	25,880 / 27,682	$2,250,991	
November 9, 2008	Tina Turner	—	Tina!: 50th Anniversary Tour	26,028 / 26,028	$2,585,972	
November 10, 2008	Tina Turner	—	Tina!: 50th Anniversary Tour	26,028 / 26,028	$2,585,972	
November 11, 2008	Coldplay	Snow Patrol	Viva la Vida Tour	25,880 / 27,682	$2,250,991	
November 24, 2008	Madonna	Paul Oakenfold	Sticky & Sweet Tour	14,843 / 14,843	$2,632,952	
December 16, 2008	AC/DC	The Answer	Black Ice World Tour	16,090 / 16,090	$1,268,752	
January 17, 2009	Céline Dion	—	Taking Chances World Tour	16,919 / 16,919	$2,300,783	
March 5, 2009	Britney Spears	The Pussycat Dolls	The Circus Starring Britney Spears	17,194 / 17,194	$1,695,449	
March 14, 2009	Elton John; Billy Joel	—	Face to Face 2009	18,883 / 18,883	$2,049,955	
April 26, 2009	Bruce Springsteen and the E Street Band	—	Working on a Dream Tour	14,361 / 15,190	$1,324,980	
April 28, 2009	Fleetwood Mac	—	Unleashed	10,653 / 11,910	$959,973	
June 13, 2009	Taylor Swift; Keith Urban	Kellie Pickler; Gloriana	Fearless Tour; Escape Together World Tour 2009	—	—	
July 1, 2009	Beyoncé	Pussycat Dolls; RichGirl	I Am... World Tour	15,709 / 15,709	$1,281,632	
August 22, 2009	Jonas Brothers	Jordin Sparks; Honor Society; Wonder Girls	Jonas Brothers World Tour 2009	17,214 / 17,214	$1,140,990	
September 4, 2009	Britney Spears	Jordin Sparks; Kristinia DeBarge	The Circus Starring Britney Spears	11,900 / 11,900	$655,507	
October 4, 2009	Metallica	Gojira; Lamb of God	World Magnetic Tour	—	$1,105,745	
October 23, 2009	AC/DC	The Answer	Black Ice World Tour	10,416 / 12,469	$832,481	
October 26, 2009	Kiss	Buckcherry	Alive 35 World Tour	—	—	
November 29, 2009	Miley Cyrus	Metro Station	Wonder World Tour	15,000 / 15,000	$1,041,720	
February 4, 2010	The Black Eyed Peas	LMFAO; Ludacris	The E.N.D. World Tour	11,921 / 11,921	$857,619	
February 27, 2010	Jay-Z	Trey Songz; Young Jeezy	The Blueprint 3 Tour	—	—	
March 17, 2010	John Mayer	Michael Franti and Spearhead	Battle Studies World Tour	13,247 / 13,247	$802,265	
March 30, 2010	Alicia Keys	Robin Thicke; Melanie Fiona	Freedom Tour	9,099 / 9,099	$643,646	
April 15, 2010	Bon Jovi	Dashboard Confessional	The Circle Tour	16,510 / 16,510	$1,815,719	
April 21, 2010	Nickelback	Shinedown; Breaking Benjamin; Sick Puppies	Dark Horse Tour	—	—	
August 11, 2010	Tom Petty & The Heartbreakers	Crosby, Stills & Nash	Mojo Tour 2010	—	—	
November 16, 2010	Dave Matthews Band	Trombone Shorty & Orleans Avenue	2010 Fall Tour	—	—	
November 18, 2010	Roger Waters	—	The Wall Live	12,665 / 12,665	$1,772,797	
December 5, 2010	Usher	Trey Songz; Miguel	OMG Tour	14,137 / 14,137	$1,201,311	
December 23, 2010	Justin Bieber	—	My World Tour	14,045 / 14,045	$823,881	
January 23, 2011	Linkin Park	—	A Thousand Suns World Tour	—	—	
March 24, 2011	Stevie Nicks; Rod Stewart	—	Heart & Soul Tour	11,454 / 11,454	$1,083,419	
April 9, 2011	Lil Wayne	Nicki Minaj; Rick Ross; Porcelain Black; Travis Barker; Mix Master Mike	I Am Music II Tour	—	—	
May 14, 2011	Bon Jovi	—	Bon Jovi Live	16,658 / 16,658	$1,649,543	
June 22, 2011	NKOTBSB	Jordin Sparks; Ashlyne Huff	NKOTBSB Tour	12,495 / 12,495	$902,678	
July 12, 2011	Sade	John Legend	Sade Live	21,870 / 23,374	$1,968,933	
July 13, 2011	Sade	John Legend	Sade Live	21,870 / 23,374	$1,968,933	
July 17, 2011	Britney Spears	Nicki Minaj; Jessie and the Toy Boys; NERVO	Femme Fatale Tour	13,014 / 13,495	$988,235	
October 1, 2011	Taylor Swift	Needtobreathe; James Wesley	Speak Now World Tour	26,244 / 26,244	$1,726,661	Usher and T.I. were the special guests.
October 2, 2011	Taylor Swift	Needtobreathe; James Wesley	Speak Now World Tour	26,244 / 26,244	$1,726,661	Usher and T.I. were the special guests.
October 28, 2011	Jay-Z; Kanye West	—	Watch the Throne Tour	27,330 / 27,330	$2,888,792	
October 29, 2011	Jay-Z; Kanye West	—	Watch the Throne Tour	27,330 / 27,330	$2,888,792	
November 2, 2011	Guns N' Roses	Buckcherry; Kelen Heller	Chinese Democracy Tour	7,873	—	
March 18, 2012	Bruce Springsteen and the E Street Band	—	Wrecking Ball World Tour	14,959 / 17,700	$1,382,345	
April 19, 2012	Van Halen	Kool & the Gang	A Different Kind of Truth	—	—	
April 23, 2012	Rammstein	Joe Letz	Made in Germany 1995–2011	—	—	
May 2, 2012	Nickelback	Seether; My Darkest Days; Bush	Here and Now Tour	—	—	
June 13, 2012	Roger Waters	—	The Wall Live	10,707 / 10,707	$1,256,465	
June 20, 2012	LMFAO	—	Sorry for Party Rocking Tour	—	—	
July 2, 2012	Coldplay	Robyn; Wolf Gang	Mylo Xyloto Tour	17,218 / 17,218	$1,220,718	
July 26, 2012	Aerosmith	Cheap Trick	Global Warming Tour	13,045 / 13,045	$1,309,188	Aerosmith performed a clip of "Woman of the World". The song hadn't been played anywhere since 1974.
August 29, 2012	Jennifer Lopez; Enrique Iglesias	Frankie J Starshell	Dance Again World Tour	9,202 / 10,225	$516,543	
November 17, 2012	Madonna	Paul Oakenfold	The MDNA Tour	13,504 / 13,504	$2,379,792	
January 23, 2013	Justin Bieber	Carly Rae Jepsen; Cody Simpson	Believe Tour	12,686 / 12,686	$995,137	
February 27, 2013	Bon Jovi	—	Because We Can	14,306 / 14,306	$1,579,947	
March 1, 2013	P!nk	The Hives	The Truth About Love Tour	14,475 / 14,475	$990,929	
March 27, 2013	Maroon 5	Neon Trees; Owl City	Overexposed Tour	—	—	
March 29, 2013	Alicia Keys	—	Set the World on Fire Tour	8,785 / 12,219	$592,200	
April 18, 2013	Taylor Swift	Ed Sheeran; Brett Eldredge	The Red Tour	25,471 / 25,471	$2,048,023	B.o.B was the special guest.
April 19, 2013	Taylor Swift	Ed Sheeran; Brett Eldredge	The Red Tour	25,471 / 25,471	$2,048,023	B.o.B was the special guest.
April 22, 2013	Rihanna	ASAP Rocky	Diamonds World Tour	13,233 / 13,233	$924,581	
June 10, 2013	Fleetwood Mac	—	Fleetwood Mac Live	—	—	
June 20, 2013	New Kids on the Block; 98 Degrees; Boyz II Men	—	The Package Tour	12,056 / 12,056	$829,916	
June 21, 2013	One Direction	5 Seconds of Summer	Take Me Home Tour	14,264 / 14,264	$917,424	
August 10, 2013	Justin Bieber	Ariana Grande; Cody Simpson	Believe Tour	12,407 / 12,407	$1,019,885	
August 22, 2013	Bruno Mars	Fitz and the Tantrums	Moonshine Jungle Tour	13,080 / 13,080	$906,482	
October 19, 2013	Rod Stewart	Steve Winwood	Live the Life Tour	7,596 / 9,518	$626,539	Postponed from April 28.
October 24, 2013	Nine Inch Nails	Godspeed You! Black Emperor; Explosions in the Sky	Tension 2013	—	—	
October 26, 2013	Selena Gomez	Emblem3; Christina Grimmie	Stars Dance Tour	9,173 / 9,173	$431,834	
November 7, 2013	Drake	Miguel; Future	Would You Like a Tour?	14,244 / 14,244	$993,612	
November 16, 2013	Elton John	—	The Diving Board Tour	14,846 / 14,846	$1,163,425	
December 1, 2013	Kanye West	Kendrick Lamar	The Yeezus Tour	—	—	
December 14, 2013	P!nk	The Hives	The Truth About Love Tour	14,683 / 14,683	$1,316,729	
December 17, 2013	Justin Timberlake	—	The 20/20 Experience World Tour	13,287 / 13,287	$1,687,436	
December 27, 2013	Jay-Z	—	Magna Carter World Tour	14,533 / 14,533	$1,207,942	
February 5, 2014	Kings of Leon	Gary Clark Jr.	Mechanical Bull Tour	—	—	
February 21, 2014	Demi Lovato	Fifth Harmony; Little Mix	The Neon Lights Tour	8,813 / 8,813	$400,275	
February 24, 2014	Eagles	—	History of the Eagles - Live in Concert	13,625 / 13,625	$1,698,448	
February 26, 2014	Imagine Dragons	Nico Vega	Into the Night Tour	—	—	
March 22, 2014	George Strait	Sheryl Crow	The Cowboy Rides Away Tour	—	—	
March 25, 2014	Miley Cyrus	Icona Pop; Sky Ferreira	Bangerz Tour	—	—	
May 6, 2014	Lady Gaga	Lady Starlight; Hatsune Miku	Artrave: The Artpop Ball	10,480 / 10,480	$941,142	
May 12, 2014	Cher	Cyndi Lauper	Dressed to Kill Tour	11,337 / 11,337	$1,088,627	
June 28, 2014	Katy Perry	Capital Cities; Ferras	Prismatic World Tour	12,843 / 12,843	$1,525,349	
August 28, 2014	Aerosmith	Slash feat. Myles Kennedy and the Conspirators	Let Rock Rule Tour	—	—	
September 19, 2014	Garth Brooks; Trisha Yearwood	—	World Tour	—	—	2 Shows
September 20, 2014	Garth Brooks; Trisha Yearwood	—	World Tour	—	—	2 Shows
September 21, 2014	Garth Brooks; Trisha Yearwood	—	World Tour	—	—	
September 26, 2014	Garth Brooks; Trisha Yearwood	—	World Tour	—	—	
September 27, 2014	Garth Brooks; Trisha Yearwood	—	World Tour	—	—	
October 15, 2014	Paul McCartney	—	Out There	13,044 / 13,044	$2,016,129	This concert was originally planned to take place on June 21 but was rescheduled due to illness.
November 22, 2014	Stevie Wonder	—	Songs in the Key of Life Tour	—	—	
December 9, 2014	Usher	DJ Cassidy; August Alsina	UR Experience Tour	11,765 / 11,765	$880,618	
December 17, 2014	Fleetwood Mac	—	On with the Show	15,591 / 15,591	$1,917,322	
February 19, 2015	Maroon 5	Magic! Rozzi Crane	Maroon V Tour	14,620 / 14,620	$1,296,760	
February 28, 2015	Billy Joel	Gavin DeGraw	Billy Joel in Concert	16,596 / 16,596	$1,616,997	
March 2, 2015	Chris Brown; Trey Songz	Tyga	Between the Sheets Tour	11,868 / 12,191	$1,081,049	
March 24, 2015	Ariana Grande	Rixton; Cashmere Cat	The Honeymoon Tour	9,271 / 9,271	$510,404	
March 25, 2015	Fleetwood Mac	—	On with the Show	13,711 / 13,711	$1,600,265	
May 13, 2015	Bette Midler	—	Divine Intervention Tour	7,058 / 7,058	$703,777	
June 6, 2015	New Kids on the Block	TLC; Nelly	The Main Event	—	—	
June 12, 2015	Kevin Hart	—	What Now? Tour	—	—	
June 13, 2015	Kevin Hart	—	What Now? Tour	—	—	
June 27, 2015	Maná	—	Cama Incendiada Tour	—	—	
July 14, 2015	Imagine Dragons	Metric; Halsey	Smoke + Mirrors Tour	9,230 / 10,373	$486,157	
August 1, 2015	Shania Twain	Gavin DeGraw	Rock This Country Tour	11,840 / 11,840	$1,137,640	
August 21, 2015	Luke Bryan	Randy Houser; Dustin Lynch	Kick the Dust Up Tour	21,040 / 24,619	$1,336,860	
August 22, 2015	Luke Bryan	Randy Houser; Dustin Lynch	Kick the Dust Up Tour	21,040 / 24,619	$1,336,860	
August 30, 2015	Mötley Crüe	Alice Cooper; The Cringe	Mötley Crüe Final Tour	—	—	
September 12, 2015	Ed Sheeran	Christina Perri; Jamie Lawson	x Tour	13,551 / 13,551	$834,508	
October 22, 2015	Ricky Martin	Wisin	One World Tour	5,703 / 7,582	$269,856	
November 17, 2015	Dead & Company	—	Dead & Company 2015 Tour	12,037 / 12,783	$953,506	
December 15, 2015	The Weeknd	Halsey; Travis Scott	The Madness Fall Tour	14,438 / 14,438	$917,808	
January 20, 2016	Madonna	Lunice	Rebel Heart Tour	10,609 / 10,609	$1,500,635	This concert was originally scheduled to take place on September 2, 2015, but was postponed due to arrangement logistics being incomplete within the time given.
February 18, 2016	Bruce Springsteen and the E Street Band	—	The River Tour 2016	16,713 / 17,450	$1,888,030	
April 12, 2016	Justin Bieber	Post Malone; Moxie Raia	Purpose World Tour	25,717 / 25,717	$2,726,349	Ludacris, Usher, and Akon were special guests.
April 13, 2016	Justin Bieber	Post Malone; Moxie Raia	Purpose World Tour	25,717 / 25,717	$2,726,349	Ludacris, Usher, and Akon were special guests.
April 15, 2016	Duran Duran	Chic; Bag Raiders	Paper Gods on Tour	—	—	
May 18, 2016	Rihanna	Travis Scott	Anti World Tour	14,397 / 14,397	$1,249,535	This concert was originally scheduled to take place on March 9, but was postponed due to "production delays".
June 9, 2016	Selena Gomez	DNCE; Bea Miller	Revival Tour	7,850 / 9,106	$508,645	
June 29, 2016	Demi Lovato; Nick Jonas	Rich Homie Quan; Migos	Future Now Tour	7,112 / 7,372	$410,165	T.I. was the special guest.
August 25, 2016	Drake; Future	Roy Wood$ dvsn	Summer Sixteen Tour	28,864 / 28,864	$3,106,599	2 Chainz was the special guest at the first show. Usher and Young Thug were special guests at the second show. Gucci Mane appeared at both shows.
August 26, 2016	Drake; Future	Roy Wood$ dvsn	Summer Sixteen Tour	28,864 / 28,864	$3,106,599	2 Chainz was the special guest at the first show. Usher and Young Thug were special guests at the second show. Gucci Mane appeared at both shows.
September 1, 2016	AC/DC	Tyler Bryant & The Shakedown	Rock or Bust World Tour	11,173 / 13,012	$1,169,355	
September 12, 2016	Kanye West	—	Saint Pablo Tour	16,011 / 16,011	$1,358,087	
October 28, 2016	Adele	—	Adele Live 2016	26,507 / 26,507	$2,924,777	
October 29, 2016	Adele	—	Adele Live 2016	26,507 / 26,507	$2,924,777	
November 1, 2016	Sia	Miguel; AlunaGeorge	Nostalgic for the Present Tour	—	—	
November 6, 2016	Stevie Nicks	The Pretenders	24 Karat Gold Tour	—	—	
February 10, 2017	Bon Jovi	Maradeen	This House Is Not for Sale Tour	16,308 / 16,665	$1,396,007	
April 12, 2017	Ariana Grande	Victoria Monét; Little Mix	Dangerous Woman Tour	10,987 / 11,285	$780,827	
April 14, 2017	Red Hot Chili Peppers	Babymetal; Jack Irons	The Getaway World Tour	13,104 / 13,104	$1,225,612	The band shot the music video for their song "Goodbye Angels".
April 23, 2017	Tim McGraw; Faith Hill	NEEDTOBREATHE	Soul2Soul: The World Tour	13,033 / 13,033	$1,170,004	
April 30, 2017	Neil Diamond	—	50 Year Anniversary World Tour	12,235 / 13,197	$1,207,288	
May 2, 2017	Chris Brown	—	The Party Tour	10,169 / 11,415	$744,422	
May 13, 2017	The Weeknd	Rae Sremmurd; Belly; 6lack	Starboy: Legend of the Fall Tour	15,087 / 15,087	$1,372,065	
November 4, 2017	Fall Out Boy	Blackbear; Jaden Smith	Mania Tour	9,309 / 11,586	$596,464	
November 7, 2017	Imagine Dragons	Grouplove; K.Flay	Evolve World Tour	11,112 / 11,811	$702,861	
November 14, 2017	Jay-Z	Vic Mensa	4:44 Tour	14,118 / 15,039	$1,832,255	
November 28, 2017	Lady Gaga	—	Joanne World Tour	12,155 / 12,155	$1,615,820	
November 29, 2017	Dead & Company	—	Dead & Company Fall Tour 2017	9,815 / 10,083	$1,052,383	
December 12, 2017	Katy Perry	Purity Ring	Witness: The Tour	8,782 / 10,580	$950,017	
December 17, 2017	Janet Jackson	—	State of the World Tour	12,399 / 12,399	$789,188	Missy Elliott was the special guest performing "Burnitup!". Additionally, Jackson performed her 2006 single "So Excited".
June 8, 2019	Ariana Grande	Normani; Social House	Sweetener World Tour	12,317 / 12,317	$1,220,686	
July 5, 2019	Jeff Lynne's ELO	Dhani Harrison	Jeff Lynne's ELO Tour 2019	—	—	
October 12, 2019	Twenty One Pilots	Misterwives	Bandito Tour	—	—	
November 19, 2019	Ariana Grande	Social House	Sweetener World Tour	10,599 / 10,599	$1,121,970	Grande performed "I Think You're Swell" and "Give It Up" with former Victorious co-stars Matt Bennett and Elizabeth Gillies. "Successful", "Everytime" and "Break Free" were not performed.
January 11, 2020	Céline Dion	—	Courage World Tour	11,212 / 11,212	$2,323,672	
February 7, 2020	Eagles	—	Hotel California 2020 Tour	39,375 / 39,375	$8,871,615	
February 8, 2020	Eagles	—	Hotel California 2020 Tour	39,375 / 39,375	$8,871,615	
February 11, 2020	Eagles	—	Hotel California 2020 Tour	39,375 / 39,375	$8,871,615	
October 27, 2021	Harry Styles	Jenny Lewis	Love on Tour	31,146 / 31,146	$4,146,897	
October 28, 2021	Harry Styles	Jenny Lewis	Love on Tour	31,146 / 31,146	$4,146,897	
November 5, 2021	Dan+Shay	—	The (Arena) Tour	—	—	
February 9, 2022	Kacey Musgraves	King Princess; MUNA	Star-crossed: unveiled	—	—	Musgraves performed a cover of Fleetwood Mac's "Dreams".
February 12, 2022	Dua Lipa	Caroline Polachek; Lolo Zouaï	Future Nostalgia Tour	12,110 / 12,110	$1,235,805	
February 24, 2022	TWICE	—	Twice 4th World Tour "III"	11,596 / 11,596	$1,294,524	
August 20, 2022	Roger Waters	—	This Is Not a Drill	11,676 / 14,445	$1,308,458	
Aug. 30, 2022	Seventeen	—	Be The Sun World Tour	9,503/10,741	$1,132,775	
October 22, 2022	Lizzo	Latto; Saucy Santana	The Special Tour	11,650 / 11,650	$1,359,408	
November 2, 2022	Blackpink	—	Born Pink World Tour	23,434 / 23,434	$6,012,820	
November 3, 2022	Blackpink	—	Born Pink World Tour	23,434 / 23,434	$6,012,820	
November 21, 2022	Ateez	KQ Fellas	The Fellowship: Break the Wall	110,000	—	
November 22, 2022	Ateez		The Fellowship: Break the Wall	110,000	—	
January 13, 2023	NCT 127	—	Neo City - The Link	—	—	
February 7, 2023	Carrie Underwood	Jimmie Allen	Denim & Rhinestones Tour	—	—	
March 7, 2023	SZA	Omar Apollo	SOS Tour	11,069 / 11,069	$1,724,301	
March 22, 2023	Stray Kids	—	Stray Kids 2nd World Tour "MANIAC"	23,019 / 23, 019	$2,553,505	Originally scheduled for July 3, 2022. Postponed due to members contracting COVID-19.
March 23, 2023	Stray Kids	—	Stray Kids 2nd World Tour "MANIAC"	23,019 / 23, 019	$2,553,505	Originally scheduled for July 3, 2022. Postponed due to members contracting COVID-19.
April 9, 2023	NCT Dream	—	The Dream Show 2: In A Dream	—	—	
April 26, 2023	Janet Jackson	Ludacris	Janet Jackson: Together Again	22,595 / 22,595	$3,057,192	
April 28, 2023	Janet Jackson	Ludacris	Janet Jackson: Together Again	22,595 / 22,595	$3,057,192	The April 28 show was originally scheduled to take place on April 27.
May 20, 2023	Mamamoo	—	My Con World Tour	—	—	
May 25, 2023	Paramore	Bloc Party; Genesis Owusu	This Is Why Tour	11,630/11,630	$1,133,447	
July 3, 2023	Alicia Keys	Libianca; Simi	Keys to the Summer Tour	7,856	$527,995	
July 13, 2023	blink-182	Turnstile; KennyHoopla	North American Tour 2023	12,872/12,872	$1,718,191	
July 15, 2023	Erykah Badu	Yasiin Bey; Tobe Nwigwe	Unfollow Me Tour	—	—	
September 25, 2023	Drake; 21 Savage		It's All a Blur Tour	32,252/32,252	$8,051,818	Originally scheduled for July 1–2, 2023.
September 26, 2023	Drake; 21 Savage		It's All a Blur Tour	32,252/32,252	$8,051,818	Originally scheduled for July 1–2, 2023.
October 1, 2023	Jonas Brothers	Lawrence	Five Albums. One Night. The World Tour	11,791/12,325	$1,988,654	
October 6, 2023	Lauren Daigle	—	The Kaleidoscope Tour	—	—	
October 14, 2023	Aerosmith	The Black Crowes	Peace Out: The Farewell Tour	—	—	
October 15, 2023	Depeche Mode	DIIV	Memento Mori World Tour	12,232/12,232	$1,903,326	
October 18, 2023	Jonas Brothers	Lawrence	Five Albums. One Night. The World Tour	9,812/11,046	$852,379	
October 25, 2023	John Mayer	JP Saxe	Solo Tour	—	—	
November 6, 2023	Joji	Kenny Beats; Lil Toe (Ammo); Savage Realm	Pandemonium Tour	—	—	
November 19, 2023	Doja Cat	Doechii	The Scarlet Tour	11,763 / 11,763	$1,646,469	
December 1, 2023	Travis Scott	Teezo Touchdown	Circus Maximus Tour	29,779 / 29,779	$4,116,231	
December 2, 2023	Travis Scott	Teezo Touchdown	Circus Maximus Tour	29,779 / 29,779	$4,116,231	
December 13, 2023	Rod Wave	Tossii	Nostalgia Tour	—	—	
March 9, 2024	Burna Boy		I Told Them... Tour	—	—	
March 20, 2024	Nicki Minaj	Monica	Pink Friday 2 World Tour	22,117 / 22,117	$3,586,119	
March 21, 2024	Nicki Minaj	Monica	Pink Friday 2 World Tour	22,117 / 22,117	$3,586,119	
March 24, 2024	IVE		Show What I Have World Tour	7,154	$858,770	
April 1, 2024	Madonna	Mary Mac	The Celebration Tour	—	—	Originally scheduled for September 5, 2023. Postponed due to health issues.
May 14, 2024	Bad Bunny		Most Wanted Tour	25,496 / 25,496	$5,404,203	
May 15, 2024	Bad Bunny		Most Wanted Tour	25,496 / 25,496	$5,404,203	
May 29, 2024	Tomorrow X Together		Act : Promise	—	—	
May 31, 2024	Megan Thee Stallion	GloRilla	Hot Girl Summer Tour			
June 1, 2024	Megan Thee Stallion	GloRilla	Hot Girl Summer Tour			
June 8, 2024	Kane Brown		In The Air Tour	—	—	
June 10, 2024	Justin Timberlake		The Forget Tomorrow World Tour	12,982 / 12,982	$2,711,435	
June 11, 2024	Gunna	Flo Milli	Bittersweet Tour	—	—	
June 14, 2024	Tim McGraw	Carly Pearce	Standing Room Only Tour	—	—	
July 19, 2024	IU		HEREH World Tour	—	—	
July 21, 2024	Janet Jackson	Nelly	Together Again	—	—	
July 23, 2024	Olivia Rodrigo	PinkPantheress	GUTS World Tour	13,829 / 13,829	$1,899,981	
July 30, 2024	AJR		The Maybe Man Tour	—	—	
July 31, 2024	Peso Pluma		Exodo World Tour	—	—	
August 10, 2024	$uicideboy$	Denzel Curry Pouya Haarper Shakewell Ekkstacy	Greyday 2024 North American Tour			
October 3, 2024	Charli XCX; Troye Sivan	Shygirl	SWEAT	—	—	
October 17, 2024	Usher	—	Usher: Past Present Future	34,504 / 34,504	$6,657,505	
October 18, 2024	Usher	—	Usher: Past Present Future	34,504 / 34,504	$6,657,505	
October 20, 2024	Usher	—	Usher: Past Present Future	34,504 / 34,504	$6,657,505	
October 22, 2024	Sabrina Carpenter	Griff	Short n' Sweet Tour	13,434 / 13,434	$1,756,731	
November 2, 2024	Billie Eilish	Towa Bird	Hit Me Hard and Soft: The Tour	33,936 / 33,936	$5,338,546	
November 3, 2024	Billie Eilish	Towa Bird	Hit Me Hard and Soft: The Tour	33,936 / 33,936	$5,338,546	
November 14, 2024	Pink	KidCutUp	Trustfall Tour			
November 16, 2024	Justin Timberlake		Forget Tomorrow World Tour	—	—	
March 18, 2025	Deftones	The Mars Volta Fleshwater	North American Tour			
March 21, 2025	Tyler, the Creator	Lil Yachty Paris Texas	Chromakopia: The World Tour	12,876 / 12,876	$2,120,052	
April 11, 2025	Kylie Minogue	Rita Ora	Tension Tour	—	—	
April 29, 2025	Pearl Jam	Teen Jesus and the Jean Teasers	Dark Matter World Tour	—	—	
May 1, 2025	Pearl Jam	Teen Jesus and the Jean Teasers	Dark Matter World Tour	—	—	
May 24, 2025	Rauw Alejandro	—	Cosa Nuestra World Tour	—	—	
June 2, 2025	Shakira	—	Las Mujeres Ya No Lloran World Tour	13,458 / 13,458	$2,888,000	
July 10, 2025	Ateez	—	In Your Fantasy	—	—	
August 20, 2025	Katy Perry	Rebecca Black	The Lifetimes Tour	10,293 / 10,293	$934,993	
September 5, 2025	Babymonster		Hello Monsters World Tour			
September 7, 2025	Kali Uchis	Thee Sacred Souls	The Sincerely, Tour	—	—	
September 9, 2025	Tate McRae	Zara Larsson	Miss Possessive Tour	—	—	
September 10, 2025	Benson Boone	Elliot James Reay	American Heart World Tour	—	—	
September 25, 2025	Tomorrow X Together	—	Act: Tomorrow	—	—	
October 31, 2025	Brandy; Monica	Muni Long; Jamal Roberts; Kelly Rowland	The Boy Is Mine Tour	―	―	
December 4, 2025	Brandy; Monica	Keyshia Cole; Jamal Roberts; Kelly Rowland	The Boy Is Mine Tour	―	―	
February 27, 2026	TWICE	—	This Is For World Tour			
March 4, 2026	Lady Gaga	—	The Mayhem Ball	23,250 / 23,250	$6,754,244	
March 5, 2026	Lady Gaga	—	The Mayhem Ball	23,250 / 23,250	$6,754,244	
March 6, 2026	Conan Gray	Esha Tewari	Wishbone World Tour	—	—	
May 1, 2026	Florence and the Machine	CMAT	Everybody Scream Tour	—	—	
July 6, 2026	Ariana Grande	—	The Eternal Sunshine Tour	—	—	
July 8, 2026	Ariana Grande	—	The Eternal Sunshine Tour	—	—	
July 9, 2026	Ariana Grande	—	The Eternal Sunshine Tour	—	—	
July 11, 2026	Tame Impala	Djo	Deadbeat Tour	—	—	
July 12, 2026	Tame Impala	Djo	Deadbeat Tour	—	—	

=== Other events ===
The arena hosted the 2004 US Figure Skating Championships.

Every few years, in early January, the State Farm Arena hosts one of the largest Christian college aged conferences: Passion Conference, when Mercedes-Benz Stadium is unavailable; the Passion 2025 Conference will be held at the State Farm Arena. The conference typically takes place over the first weekend in the new year and features big names in the Christian world such as Louie Gigilio, Chris Tomlin, Matt Redman, Kristian Stanfill, John Piper, rap artist Lecrae and many more. The conference is typically sold out.

The arena served as the venue for the semifinals of the 2022 League of Legends World Championship. The semifinals saw South Korean teams T1 and DRX progress to the finals, held at the Chase Center in San Francisco. DRX would eventually win the finals and become the 2022 League of Legends World Champions.

The arena hosted Hot Wheels Monster Trucks Live in 2024 and hosted it again in 2025

== Renovations ==
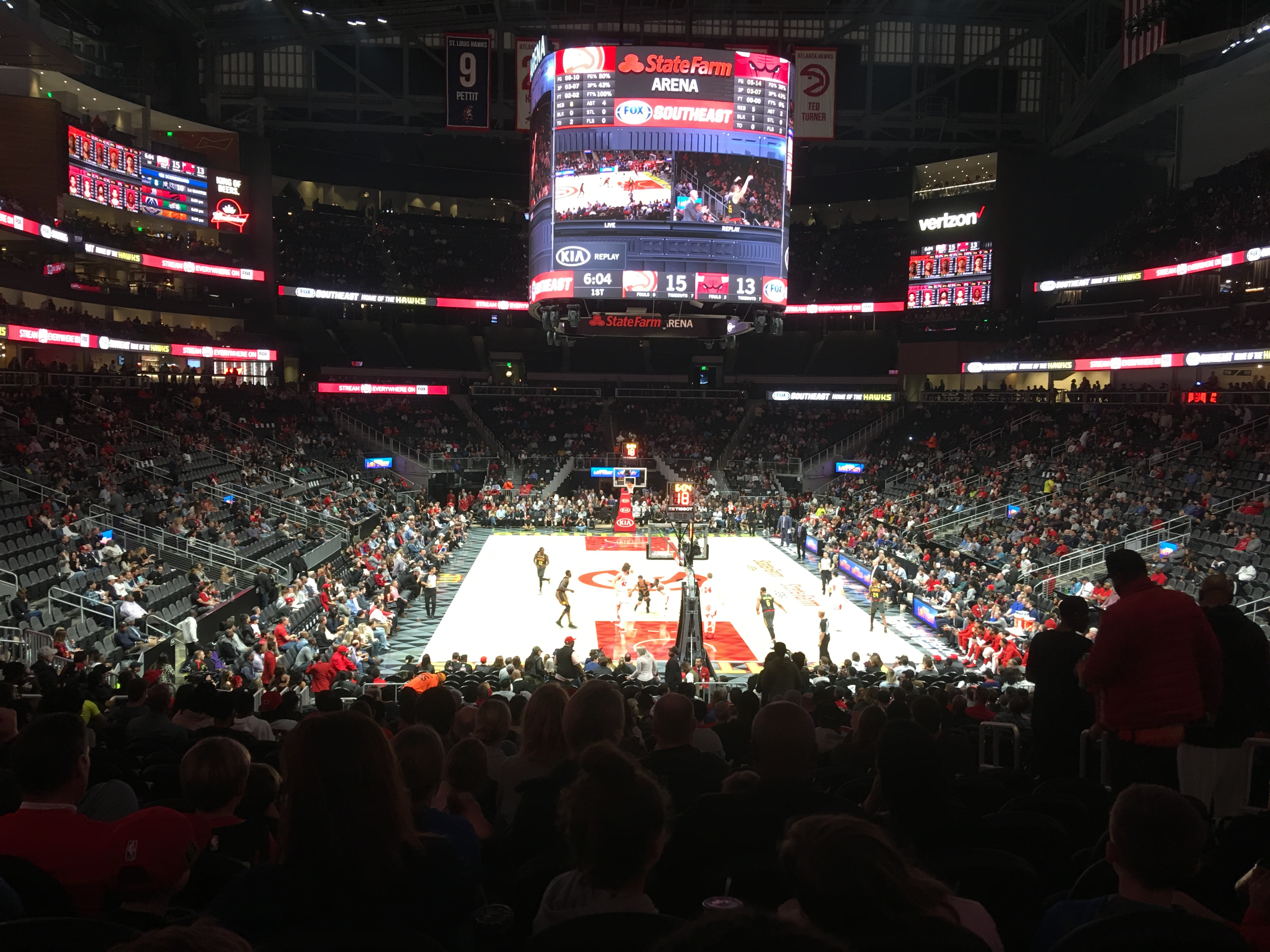
State Farm Arena after renovations during a 2019 Hawks game vs the Chicago Bulls

Shortly after acquiring the Hawks and the operating rights to Philips Arena on June 24, 2015, Tony Ressler announced his intentions of remodeling the arena to keep the Hawks in Downtown Atlanta at a cost between $150 million and $250 million. The proposed renovation would rebuild the entire seating bowl to optimize its sightlines for basketball and remove the wall of suites which dominate one side of the arena and replace them with a more traditional suite configuration. The Hawks are also in discussions with the city about building a mixed-use entertainment district similar to L.A. Live around Philips Arena, to better connect it to other nearby attractions such as Centennial Olympic Park and Mercedes-Benz Stadium. On November 1, 2016, the Hawks and the city of Atlanta reached a financing agreement on renovating Philips Arena, with the city contributing $142.5 million and the Hawks $50 million plus cost overruns to the project. With the renovation, the Hawks signed a lease extension lasting through June 30, 2046, with an early termination penalty of $200 million plus the remaining balance of the arena's bonds.

The first phase of renovations, completed during the Hawks' 2017 off-season, removed the upper levels of the suite wall, reducing the total number of suites from 90 to 40, and added the Courtside Club behind one of the baskets. Renovations for 2018 were described by Hawks chief operating officer Thad Sheely as a "gut rehab". The arena renovations brought new premium seating areas, connected 360-degree concourses, a new center-hung videoboard three times larger than its predecessor as well as additional videoboards in the corners of the upper decks, new dining options including a bar and grill operated by country group Zac Brown Band and other unique features including an in-arena barber shop operated by Atlanta rapper Killer Mike and Topgolf suites. Over 100,000 ft^{2} (9,300 m^{2}) of former office and storage space within the arena was repurposed as "fan space". The first ticketed event at the renovated State Farm Arena was So So Def's 25th anniversary concert on October 21, 2018, while the Hawks' first regular season home game took place on October 24 against the Dallas Mavericks.

Due to the renovations conflicting with the WNBA schedule, the Dream announced that they would move their 2017 and 2018 home schedules to McCamish Pavilion on the campus of Georgia Tech, mirroring the Hawks' move to the same venue (then known as Alexander Memorial Coliseum) between the time the Omni was razed and State Farm Arena was built. With the release of the 2019 WNBA schedule on December 18, 2018, the Dream confirmed that they would be returning to State Farm Arena. However, following the conclusion of the 2019 WNBA regular season, team officials indicated that the Dream would not be returning to State Farm Arena for the next season (which would be in 2021 due to the 2020 WNBA season being played in a COVID-19 bubble), citing disagreements with the Hawks' management. On October 18, 2019, the Dream announced that they would move to the Gateway Center Arena in suburban College Park, sharing the venue with the Hawks' NBA G League affiliate, the College Park Skyhawks. On June 21, 2024, the Dream returned to State Farm Arena for the first time since 2019 when it hosted the Indiana Fever and its highly touted rookie Caitlin Clark. The game was originally slated for Gateway Center Arena, but high demand for tickets and Clark's immense popularity led to the Dream relocating to State Farm Arena for this contest.

== See also ==
- List of indoor arenas by capacity

Events and tenants
Preceded by Georgia Dome	Home of the Atlanta Hawks; 1999–present	Succeeded by current
Preceded by Winnipeg Arena (as the Winnipeg Jets)	Home of the Atlanta Thrashers; 1999–2011	Succeeded by Bell MTS Place (as Winnipeg Jets)
Preceded by Arena at Gwinnett Center	Home of the Georgia Force; 2004–2007	Succeeded by Arena at Gwinnett Center
Preceded by first arena McCamish Pavilion	Home of the Atlanta Dream; 2008–2016; 2019	Succeeded by McCamish Pavilion; Gateway Center Arena
Preceded by New Orleans Arena; Joe Louis Arena	Home of the Royal Rumble; 2002; 2010	Succeeded by FleetCenter; TD Garden
Preceded by American Airlines Center	Host of the NHL All-Star Game; 2008	Succeeded by Bell Centre
Preceded by United Center	Host of the NBA All-Star Game; 2021	Succeeded by Rocket Mortgage FieldHouse
