= Taco Mac =

Chain of sports bars based in Atlanta, Georgia

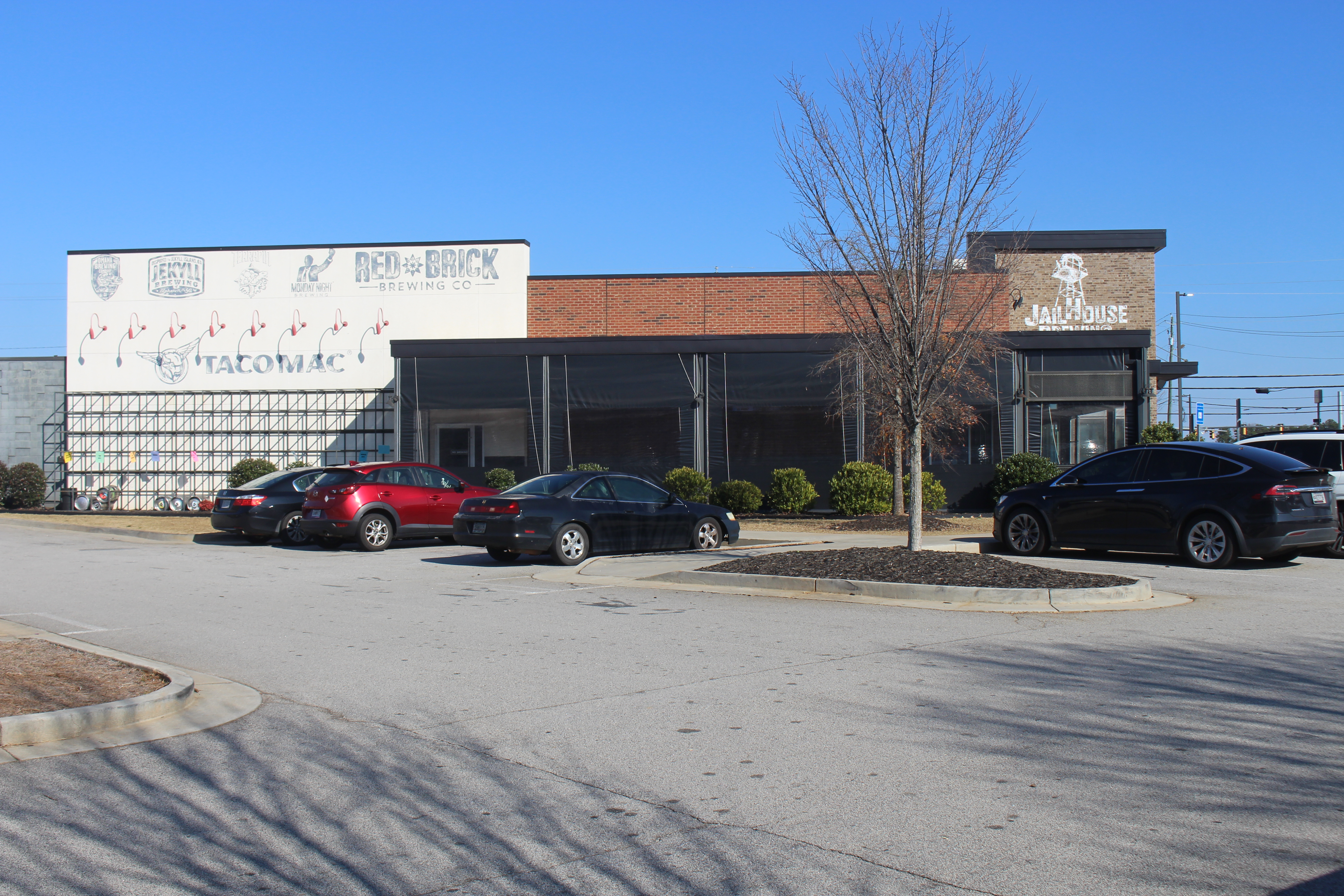
- Taco Mac in McDonough, Georgia

Restaurant information
- Established: 1979
- Owner: Harold Martin Jr.
- Location: Atlanta, Georgia
- Website: tacomac.com

Taco Mac is a chain of sports bars based in Atlanta, Georgia. It was founded in 1979 by Greg Wakeham, Lou Chambers, and one other with the chain's original location being in Atlanta's Virginia Highlands neighborhood (Originally founded by Carl D. Jackson, also under the name Taco Mac); this location is now closed as of May 2025. In 2000, Bob Campbell, Joe Ardagna, and Greg Wakeham established Tappan Street Restaurant Group, who expanded the chain to 25 locations in 3 states. In late 2014, Tappan Street was sold to the Dallas, Texas-based private equity firm CIC Partners. In March 2018, CIC Partners sold Taco Mac to the investor group Fresh Hospitality, whose CEO, Harold Martin Jr., then became the chain's CEO.
