= Somewhere Back in Time =

Compilation album by Iron Maiden
- Released: 12 May 2008
- Recorded: 1982–1988
- Genre: Heavy metal
- Length: 71:25
- Labels: EMI; Universal Music Group (US)
- Producer: Martin Birch

Iron Maiden chronology
| A Matter of Life and Death (2006) | Somewhere Back in Time (2008) | Flight 666 - The Original Soundtrack (2009) |

Somewhere Back in Time - The Best of: 1980 - 1989 is a best of release by the English heavy metal band Iron Maiden, containing a selection of songs originally recorded for their first eight albums (including Live After Death).

== Background ==
The album was released in conjunction with the band's Somewhere Back In Time World Tour to allow new fans to listen to a selection of the band's material that was played on the tour. The cover artwork by Derek Riggs features the Pharaoh Eddie monument from Powerslave and Cyborg Eddie from Somewhere in Time.

A number of tracks were taken from the band's 1985 live album, Live After Death, because the band preferred to use recordings which featured current Iron Maiden vocalist Bruce Dickinson rather than Paul Di'Anno, who sang on their first two studio releases.

== Reception ==
Professional ratings
Review scores
| Source | Rating |
|---|---|
| About.com | 3.5/5 stars |
| AllMusic | 3.5/5 stars |
| Classic Rock | 9/10 |
| Kerrang! | 5/5 |
| Metal Hammer | 9/10 |
| Rocksound | 8/10 |

Reviews for the compilation were generally positive, with Kerrang! commenting that "metal collections don't come much more solid than this." Classic Rock deemed it "a relentless, 70-minute crowd pleaser marathon," containing "timeless anthems that still make the adrenalin surge and the sinews stiffen after all these years." Metal Hammer praised it for being "a reminder of why Iron Maiden became the most important band on the planet back in the 1980s - and why, once again, they've reclaimed that crown."

AllMusic, however, were more critical of the release, deeming the album "merely adequate" and decrying the band's decision to avoid using the original versions of songs featuring Paul Di'Anno on lead vocals.

== Track listing ==
All songs written by Steve Harris, except where noted.

| No. | Title | Writer(s) | Original album | Length |
|---|---|---|---|---|
| 1. | "Churchill's Speech" | Winston Churchill | 1985 ~ Live After Death (Segues into the next song) | 0:49 |
| 2. | "Aces High" (Live in Long Beach, US 1985) | | 1985 ~ Live After Death (1984 ~ Powerslave) | 4:36 |
| 3. | "2 Minutes to Midnight" | Adrian Smith, Bruce Dickinson | 1984 ~ Powerslave | 6:00 |
| 4. | "The Trooper" | | 1983 ~ Piece of Mind | 4:11 |
| 5. | "Wasted Years" | Smith | 1986 ~ Somewhere in Time | 5:06 |
| 6. | "Children of the Damned" | | 1982 ~ The Number of the Beast | 4:35 |
| 7. | "The Number of the Beast" | | 1982 ~ The Number of the Beast | 4:53 |
| 8. | "Run to the Hills" | | 1982 ~ The Number of the Beast | 3:53 |
| 9. | "Phantom of the Opera" (Live in Hammersmith, UK 1984) | | 1985 ~ Live After Death (1980 ~ Iron Maiden) | 7:21 |
| 10. | "The Evil That Men Do" | Smith, Harris, Dickinson | 1988 ~ Seventh Son of a Seventh Son | 4:34 |
| 11. | "Wrathchild" (Live in Hammersmith, UK 1984) | | 1985 ~ Live After Death (1981 ~ Killers) | 3:07 |
| 12. | "Can I Play With Madness" | Smith, Dickinson, Harris | 1988 ~ Seventh Son of a Seventh Son | 3:31 |
| 13. | "Powerslave" | Dickinson | 1984 ~ Powerslave | 6:47 |
| 14. | "Hallowed Be Thy Name" | | 1982 ~ The Number of the Beast | 7:12 |
| 15. | "Iron Maiden" (Live in Long Beach, US 1985) | | 1985 ~ Live After Death (1980 ~ Iron Maiden) | 4:50 |
| Total length: | | | | 71:25 |

== Personnel ==
Production and performance credits are adapted from the album liner notes.

Iron Maiden

- Bruce Dickinson - lead vocals
- Steve Harris - bass guitar, keyboards on 10 & 12
- Dave Murray - guitars
- Adrian Smith - guitars, keyboards on 10 & 12
- Nicko McBrain - drums on tracks 2 - 5, 9 - 13 & 15
- Clive Burr - drums on tracks 6 - 8 & 14

Production

- Martin Birch – producer, mixing
- Derek Riggs – cover illustration
- Ross Halfin – photography
- Peacock – art direction, design
- Rod Smallwood – management
- Andy Taylor – management

== Charts ==
| Chart (2008) | Peak position |
|---|---|
| Australian Albums (ARIA) | 81 |
| Austrian Albums (Ö3 Austria) | 26 |
| Belgian Albums (Ultratop Flanders) | 19 |
| Belgian Albums (Ultratop Wallonia) | 36 |
| Canadian Albums (Billboard) | 7 |
| Dutch Albums (Album Top 100) | 74 |
| Finnish Albums (Suomen virallinen lista) | 3 |
| German Albums (Offizielle Top 100) | 84 |
| Italian Albums (FIMI) | 27 |
| Japanese Albums (Oricon) | 39 |
| New Zealand Albums (RMNZ) | 24 |
| Norwegian Albums (VG-lista) | 3 |
| Scotland (Official Charts Company) | 14 |
| Spanish Albums (Promusicae) | 36 |
| Swedish Albums (Sverigetopplistan) | 2 |
| Swiss Albums (Schweizer Hitparade) | 31 |
| UK Albums (Official Charts) | 14 |
| US Billboard 200 | 58 |

| Chart (2009) | Peak position |
|---|---|
| Mexican Albums (Top 100 Mexico) | 47 |

| Chart (2010) | Peak position |
|---|---|
| Greek Albums (IFPI) | 56 |

| Chart (2025) | Peak position |
|---|---|
| Greek Albums (IFPI) | 54 |

== Certifications ==
| Region | Certification | Certified units/sales |
|---|---|---|
| Finland (Musiikkituottajat) | Gold | 11,815 |
| New Zealand (RMNZ) | Gold | 7,500^{‡} |
| Sweden (GLF) | Gold | 20,000^{^} |
| United Kingdom (BPI) | Platinum | 300,000^{‡} |
^{^} Shipments figures based on certification alone.^{‡} Sales+streaming figures based on certification alone.
