= 12 Wasted Years =

Video by Iron Maiden
- Released: October 1987
- Genre: Heavy metal
- Length: 1:30:00
- Label: PMI

Iron Maiden chronology
Live After Death (1985)	12 Wasted Years (1987)	Maiden England (1989)

12 Wasted Years is a video documentary of heavy metal band Iron Maiden, focusing on the history of the band from 1975 to 1987. It includes several rare videos and interviews from the band's career, some of which were later included on the 2004 documentary The Early Days.

The video was released on laserdisc and VHS tape.

In March 2013, Iron Maiden included the full documentary in a reissue of their 1989 concert film, Maiden England.

== Reception ==
Professional ratings
Review scores
Source	Rating
AllMusic	favourable

AllMusic describes it as a "highly recommended documentary".

=== Track List ===
Tracks
No.	Title	Writer(s)	Originally From	Length
1.	"Stranger in a Strange Land" (Promo Video)	Adrian Smith	1986 ~ Somewhere in Time
2.	"Charlotte the Harlot" (Live in 1980)	Dave Murray	1980 ~ Iron Maiden
3.	"Running Free" (Top of the Pops, 1980)	Steve Harris, Paul Di'Anno	1980 ~ Iron Maiden
4.	"Women in Uniform" (Promo Video)	Greg Macainsh	1980 ~ Women in Uniform
5.	"Murders In The Rue Morgue" (Live in 1982)	Harris	1981 ~ Killers
6.	"Children of the Damned" (Live in 1982)	Harris	1982 ~ The Number of the Beast
7.	"The Number of the Beast" (Live in 1985)	Harris	1982 ~ The Number of the Beast
8.	"Total Eclipse" (Live in 1982)	Harris, Murray, Clive Burr	1982 ~ Run to the Hills
9.	"Iron Maiden" (Live in 1983)	Harris	1980 ~ Iron Maiden
10.	"Sanctuary" (Live in 1982)	Harris, Murray, Di'Anno	1980 ~ Sanctuary
11.	"The Prisoner" (Live in 1982)	Smith, Harris	1982 ~ The Number of the Beast
12.	"22 Acacia Avenue" (Live in 1983)	Harris, Smith	1982 ~ The Number of the Beast
13.	"Wasted Years" (German TV Playback Performance, 1986)	Smith	1986 ~ Somewhere in Time
14.	"The Trooper" (Live in 1985)	Harris	1983 ~ Piece of Mind

=== Additional Tracks ===
Tracks
No.	Title	Writer(s)	Originally From	Length
1.	"Drifter" (Live in 1980)	Harris	1981 ~ Killers
2.	"Prowler"	Harris	1980 ~ Iron Maiden
3.	"Phantom of the Opera" (Live in 1980)	Harris	1980 ~ Iron Maiden
4.	"She's a Roller" (Live in 1977) (Performed by Urchin)	Smith	Previously Unreleased
5.	"Caught Somewhere in Time" (Studio Version) (Video Clips Taken in Japan, 1987)	Harris	1986 ~ Somewhere in Time
6.	"Run to the Hills" (Live in 1984)	Harris	1982 ~ The Number of the Beast

== Certifications ==
Region	Certification	Certified units/sales
United States (RIAA)	Gold	50,000^{^}
^{^} Shipments figures based on certification alone.
