= Live!! +one =

EP by Iron Maiden
- Released: 25 December 1980
- Recorded: 4 July 1980
- Venues: Marquee Club, London
- Genre: Heavy metal
- Length: 22:57
- Label: EMI
- Producer: Doug Hall

Iron Maiden chronology
Iron Maiden (1980)	Live!! +one (1980)	Killers (1981)

Live!! +one is a live EP by British heavy metal band Iron Maiden. Initially released only in Japan on 25 December 1980, it was recorded live at the Marquee Club in London on 4 July 1980. The recordings of "Sanctuary" and "Drifter" were only ever issued on this EP, but the other two tracks have appeared as B-sides on subsequent singles. The songs "Drifter" and "Phantom of the Opera" were featured in a 1981 documentary called "Twentieth Century Box" of London Weekend Television alongside "Iron Maiden" which was not featured in the EP.

In 1984 the EP was reissued in Greece with an expanded track listing, but only "I've Got the Fire" was actually recorded at the Marquee Club. The other additional tracks appeared on the Maiden Japan EP and "Prowler" was taken from the band's self-titled debut album.

== Track listing ==
=== Japanese release ===
Side One
No.	Title	Writer(s)	Original Release	Length
1.	"Sanctuary" (Live in London, 4 July 1980)	Paul Di'Anno, Dave Murray, Steve Harris	1980 ~ Iron Maiden	4:22
2.	"Phantom of the Opera" (Live in London, 4 July 1980)	Harris	1980 ~ Iron Maiden	7:12

Side Two
No.	Title	Writer(s)	Original Release	Length
3.	"Drifter" (Live in London, 4 July 1980)	Harris	1981 ~ Killers	8:16
4.	"Women in Uniform" (Skyhooks Cover)	Greg Macainsh	1980 ~ Women in Uniform	3:07

=== Greek release ===
Side One
No.	Title	Writer(s)	Original Release	Length
1.	"Drifter" (Live in London, 4 July 1980)	Harris	1981 ~ Killers	8:16
2.	"Phantom of the Opera" (Live in London, 4 July 1980)	Harris	1980 ~ Iron Maiden	7:12
3.	"Women in Uniform" (Skyhooks Cover)	Macainsh	1980 ~ Women in Uniform	3:07
4.	"Innocent Exile" (Live in Nagoya 23 May 1981)	Harris	1981 ~ Killers	4:04

Side Two
No.	Title	Writer(s)	Original Release	Length
5.	"Sanctuary" (Live in London, 4 July 1980)	Di'Anno, Murray, Harris	1980 ~ Iron Maiden	4:22
6.	"Prowler"	Harris	1980 ~ Iron Maiden	3:55
7.	"Running Free" (Live in Nagoya 23 May 1981)	Di'Anno, Harris	1980 ~ Iron Maiden	2:47
8.	"Remember Tomorrow" (Live in Nagoya 23 May 1981)	Di'Anno, Harris	1980 ~ Iron Maiden	5:43
9.	"I've Got the Fire" (Montrose Cover) (Live in London, 3 April 1980)	Ronnie Montrose	1980 ~ Sanctuary	3:14

== Personnel ==
- Paul Di'Anno – lead vocals
- Dave Murray – guitar
- Dennis Stratton - guitar, backing vocals (1980 recordings only)
- Adrian Smith – guitar, backing vocals (1981 recordings only)
- Steve Harris – bass, backing vocals
- Clive Burr – drums
