= Menace to Society =

Menace to Society can refer to:

- Menace to Society (Lizzy Borden album), 1986
- Menace to Society (Killers album), 1994
- Menace II Society, a 1993 film
  - Menace II Society (soundtrack), the soundtrack album for the film

== See also ==
- Menace to Sobriety (disambiguation)
- Anti-social behaviour
