= Live After Death =

1985 live album by Iron Maiden

Live album and video by Iron Maiden
- Released: 14 October 1985 (audio); 23 October 1985 (video)
- Recorded: 14–17 March 1985 (sides 1–3); 8–12 October 1984 (side 4)
- Venues: Long Beach Arena, California (sides 1–3); Hammersmith Odeon, London (side 4)
- Genre: Heavy metal
- Length: 98:09 (audio); 90:00 (video, approx.)
- Label: EMI
- Director: Jim Yukich
- Producer: Martin Birch

Iron Maiden chronology
Powerslave (1984)	Live After Death (1985)	Somewhere in Time (1986)

Iron Maiden video chronology
Behind the Iron Curtain (1984)	Live After Death (1985)	12 Wasted Years (1986)
Death on the Road (2006)	Live After Death (2008)	Iron Maiden: Flight 666 (2009)

Alternative cover
- 2008 DVD reissue cover

Singles from Live After Death
- 1. "Running Free" Released: 13 September 1985; 2. "Run to the Hills" Released: 2 December 1985

Live After Death is a live album by English heavy metal band Iron Maiden, originally released in October 1985 on EMI in Europe and its sister label Capitol Records in the US (it was re-released by Sanctuary/Columbia Records in the US in 2002 on CD and by Universal Music Group/Sony BMG Music Entertainment on DVD). It was recorded at Long Beach Arena, California and Hammersmith Odeon, London during the band's World Slavery Tour.

The video version of the concert only contains footage from the Long Beach shows. It was initially released through Sony as a "Video LP" on VHS hi-fi stereo and Beta hi-fi stereo with 14 songs and no special features and was reissued on DVD on 4 February 2008, which coincided with the start of the band's Somewhere Back in Time World Tour. In addition to the complete concert, the DVD features Part 2 of The History of Iron Maiden documentary series, which began with 2004's The Early Days and continued with 2013's Maiden England '88, documenting the recording of the Powerslave album and the following World Slavery Tour.

== Background ==
Iron Maiden's World Slavery Tour began in Warsaw, Poland on 9 August 1984 and lasted 331 days, during which 187 concerts were performed To tie in with their 1984 album, Powerslave, the tour's stage show adhered to an ancient Egyptian theme, which was decorated with sarcophagi and Egyptian hieroglyphs, and mummified representations of the band's mascot, Eddie, in addition to numerous pyrotechnic effects. The theatricality of the stage show meant that it would become one of the band's most acclaimed tours, making it the perfect backdrop to their first live double album and concert video.

For the Live After Death video, the band hired director Jim Yukich to film two shows of their four-night run at Long Beach Arena, California from 14 to 17 March 1985.

"The whole thing should have been from [London's] Hammersmith [Odeon]. The performances there were better than the ones in Los Angeles. But the lighting engineer, Dave Lights, was at war with the video guys and consequently the whole thing was too dark. So we had great audio footage, but a lot of the concert footage was unusable." – Bruce Dickinson

The double LP was also recorded at Long Beach, although side four contains tracks recorded at Hammersmith Odeon, London on 8, 9, 10 and 12 October 1984. Bassist Steve Harris has stated that, even if they had had the time, they would not have added any studio overdubbing to the soundtrack: "We were really anti all that, anyway. We were very much, like, 'This has got to be totally live,' you know?"

The album has received consistent critical praise, with reviewers hailing it as one of the genre's best live albums. For the band, the release was advantageous as it meant they could delay the recording of their next studio album, 1986's Somewhere in Time. Time off was beneficial for the band, who desperately needed to recuperate following the World Slavery Tour's heavy schedule.

=== Recorded dates ===
According to Harris, while the video used footage from two nights at Long Beach, the audio version is only made up of one performance, although no exact dates are specified. However, during "Running Free" on the audio version, vocalist Bruce Dickinson refers to it being the fourth concert at the venue, which should mean that the audio version was recorded on Sunday, 17 March. On the video version, after "2 Minutes to Midnight", Dickinson refers to it being "night number two" (Friday, 15 March), while on the documentary 12 Wasted Years, "The Trooper" and "The Number of the Beast" are said to have been recorded on Saturday, 16 March.

== Cover art ==
The cover art, by Derek Riggs, pictures the band's mascot, Eddie, rising from a grave. Engraved on his tombstone is a misquote from fantasy and horror fiction author H. P. Lovecraft's The Nameless City:

"That is not dead which can eternal lie
Yet [sic] with strange aeons even death may die."

The original Lovecraft text has an "and" instead of a "yet".

Also engraved on the headstone is what appears to be Eddie's full name, "Edward T H--", the remainder of which (his supposed surname, "Head") is obscured by a clump of sod.

The depiction of Eddie follows continuity from previous artworks. His long hair is restored and he sports the metal screw cartouche from his Piece of Mind lobotomy, which is being struck by lightning. He is also bound by metal cuffs connected by an electrical surge, as seen in the Powerslave tour promotional artwork.

The back cover depicts the rest of the graveyard and a city being destroyed by lightning, which Riggs states was inspired by John Martin's painting, The Destruction of Sodom and Gomorrah. Death appears in the clouds above the destroyed city; the character is a regular feature of Riggs' covers (such as "Twilight Zone", "The Trooper", Powerslave and Somewhere in Time).

Near Eddie's grave is a black cat with a halo, which also features in the Somewhere in Time and "Twilight Zone" artworks. This, said Riggs, was "not about anything really" and was added "to get people's attention". To the cat's left is a tombstone engraved with "Here lies Derek Riggs". Riggs also included gravestones that state "Live With Pride", added at the band's request to show opposition to lip-synched performances, "Here Lies Faust In Body Only", the German legend who sold his soul to the Devil (hence "in body only"), and a stone that simply reads "Thank You", representing the Grateful Dead.

The sleeve was hung in the studio where Florence and the Machine recorded their debut album Lungs. "Some of the songs on my album are like gothic horror shows," said singer Florence Welch. "So, yeah, Iron Maiden massively influenced the album, quote-unquote!"

The poster appears in the season 10 episode 22 episode of The Walking Dead, "Here's Negan". It can be seen above Lucille and Negan's bed.

== Intro ==
The intro before "Aces High" is a part of the We shall fight on the beaches speech made by Winston Churchill in the House of Commons on 4 June 1940. (Churchill re-recorded the speech – the original speech in the House of Commons was not recorded.):

"... We shall go on to the end, we shall fight in France, we shall fight on the seas and oceans, we shall fight with growing confidence and growing strength in the air, we shall defend our Island, whatever the cost may be, we shall fight on the beaches, we shall fight on the landing grounds, we shall fight in the fields and in the streets, we shall fight in the hills; we shall never surrender ..."

It was later used for their Ed Hunter Tour, Somewhere Back in Time World Tour, Maiden England World Tour, and the Legacy of the Beast World Tour.

== Critical reception ==
Professional ratings
Review scores
Source	Rating
About.com (DVD)	4.5/5 stars
AllMusic	4.5/5 stars
AllMusic (VHS)	4.5/5 stars
Collector's Guide to Heavy Metal	8/10
Kerrang!	5/5
Kerrang! (DVD)	5/5
PopMatters (DVD)	9/10
Sputnikmusic	5/5
The Daily Vault	A

Live After Death has been highly rated by critics since its release; Kerrang! and Sputnikmusic both agree that it is "possibly the greatest live album of all time", while AllMusic describes it as "easily one of heavy metal's best live albums".

Sputnikmusic argues that it is the band's best live album, concluding that "Iron Maiden's 1985 release has everything you could ask for. With, exciting renditions of classic songs, and brilliant performances, Live After Death is quite a fun listen." PopMatters describes it as "a searing, 102-minute collection of Maiden at [their] peak ... an absolute treasure for fans [which] went on to be universally regarded as an instant classic in the genre".

The album's video counterpart received similar critical acclaim, with AllMusic stating that "Live After Death is a visual pleasure as much as a sonic one. The elaborate staging and lighting effects are excellent. The editing is superb as well [with] very few rapid-fire, seizure-inducing camera cuts". The bonus features included in the 2008 DVD reissue were also praised by PopMatters, Kerrang! and About.com.

The album has also been described by Classic Rock as "the last great live album of the vinyl era."

== Track listing ==
All tracks are written by Steve Harris, except where noted.

Side one
No.	Title	Writer(s)	Length
1.	"Churchill's Speech" (intro)	Winston Churchill	1:09
2.	"Aces High"		4:07
3.	"2 Minutes to Midnight"	Adrian Smith; Bruce Dickinson	5:52
4.	"The Trooper"		3:59
5.	"Revelations"	Dickinson	5:59
6.	"Flight of Icarus"	Smith; Dickinson	3:21

Side two
No.	Title	Writer(s)	Length
7.	"Rime of the Ancient Mariner"		13:03
8.	"Powerslave"	Dickinson	7:06
9.	"The Number of the Beast"		4:48
Total length:			49:24

Side three
No.	Title	Writer(s)	Length
1.	"Hallowed Be Thy Name"		7:17
2.	"Iron Maiden"		4:11
3.	"Run to the Hills"		3:52
4.	"Running Free"	Harris; Paul Di'Anno	8:16

Side four
No.	Title	Writer(s)	Length
5.	"Wrathchild" (Hammersmith Odeon 08.10.84)		2:54
6.	"22 Acacia Avenue" (Hammersmith Odeon 08.10.84)	Harris; Smith	6:04
7.	"Children of the Damned" (Hammersmith Odeon 10.10.84)		4:19
8.	"Die with Your Boots On" (Hammersmith Odeon 10.10.84)	Smith; Dickinson; Harris	4:51
9.	"Phantom of the Opera" (Hammersmith Odeon 09.10.84)		7:01
Total length:			48:45

1995 reissue bonus disc
No.	Title	Writer(s)	Length
1.	"Losfer Words (Big 'Orra)" (Hammersmith Odeon 08.10.84)		4:14
2.	"Sanctuary" (Long Beach Arena)	Harris; Di'Anno; Dave Murray	4:40
3.	"Murders in the Rue Morgue" (Hammersmith Odeon 12.10.84)		4:32
Total length:			13:26

- The first 13 tracks were recorded at Long Beach Arena in Long Beach, California, from 14 to 17 March 1985. The last five songs were recorded earlier on the same tour, at the Hammersmith Odeon in London on 8, 9, 10 and 12 October 1984. The Live After Death video was also recorded at Long Beach Arena, but on different nights than the audio.
- The 1985 CD edition includes only the first 13 tracks due to CD length restrictions, and merges the intro track into the second, for a total of 12 tracks. A few tracks are also shortened, most notably "Running Free", which is missing the entire audience participation middle section, thus reducing its length to only 3:24 from its full 8-minute runtime. A 1995 re-release features this same truncated version of the concert, but comes with an additional CD containing the B-sides from the Live After Death single releases.
- The 1998 and 2020 remastered CD reissues include the full concert in its original length, plus the additional tracks from side four on a second CD.
- The video releases contain the 13 tracks included with the audio releases and closes with "Sanctuary". The DVD version features a bonus disc that includes The History of Iron Maiden – Part 2: Live After Death, the second part of an ongoing documentary series about the history of the band, Behind the Iron Curtain feature, promo videos and additional footage from various concerts, as well as a gallery of artwork and photos.

== Personnel ==
Production and performance credits are adapted from the album, VHS and DVD liner notes.

=== Iron Maiden ===
- Bruce Dickinson – vocals, guitar on "Revelations"
- Dave Murray – guitar
- Adrian Smith – guitar, backing vocals
- Steve Harris – bass guitar, backing vocals
- Nicko McBrain – drums

=== Production ===
- Martin "Live Animal" Birch – producer, engineer, mixing
- Mick McKenna – assistant engineer (Hammersmith)
- Charlie McPherson – assistant engineer (Hammersmith)
- Ricky Delena – engineer (Long Beach)
- Nick Basich – second engineer (Long Beach), second mixing engineer
- Wally Traugott – mastering
- Derek Riggs – sleeve illustration, sleeve concept
- Ross Halfin – photography
- Steve Joule – sleeve design
- Rod Smallwood – sleeve concept
- Simon Heyworth – remastering (1998 edition)
- Jim Yukich – director (video)
- Matthew Amos – director ("The History of Iron Maiden" documentary)
- Joe Abercrombie – editor ("The History of Iron Maiden" documentary)
- Dave Pattenden – producer (DVD)

== Charts ==
=== Album ===
Chart (1985–1986)	Peak position
Australian Albums (Kent Music Report)	31
Canada Top Albums/CDs (RPM)	24
Dutch Albums (Album Top 100)	8
Finnish Albums (The Official Finnish Charts)	8
French Albums (SNEP)	18
German Albums (Offizielle Top 100)	10
Japanese Albums (Oricon)	7
New Zealand Albums (RMNZ)	16
Norwegian Albums (VG-lista)	13
Swedish Albums (Sverigetopplistan)	8
Swiss Albums (Schweizer Hitparade)	26
UK Albums (Official Charts)	2
US Billboard 200	19

Chart (2005)	Peak position
Norwegian Albums (VG-lista)	38

Chart (2008–2009)	Peak position
German Albums (Offizielle Top 100)	20
Mexican Albums (Top 100 Mexico)	67
Norwegian Albums (VG-lista)	36
Swedish Albums (Sverigetopplistan)	41

Chart (2013)	Peak position
Finnish Albums (Suomen virallinen lista)	28
German Albums (Offizielle Top 100)	93
Norwegian Albums (VG-lista)	23
Swedish Albums (Sverigetopplistan)	28

Chart (2020–2025)	Peak position
Belgian Albums (Ultratop Wallonia)	24
German Rock & Metal Albums (Offizielle Top 100)	12
Hungarian Albums (MAHASZ)	25
Portuguese Albums (AFP)	42
Scottish Albums (Official Charts)	15
UK Rock & Metal Albums (Official Charts)	1

=== 1985 VHS ===
Chart (1985)	Peak position
United States (Billboard Charts)	2

=== 2008 DVD ===
Chart (2008)	Peak position
Australia (ARIA Charts)	1
Austria (Ö3 Austria Top 40)	3
Belgium (Flanders) (Ultratop)	2
Belgium (Wallonia) (Ultratop)	9
Denmark ( Tracklisten)	1
Finland (The Official Finnish Charts)	1
France (SNEP)	1
Germany (Media Control Charts)	1
Hungary (Mahasz)	3
Italy (FIMI)	1
Ireland (IRMA)	2
New Zealand (RIANZ)	1
Netherlands (MegaCharts)	6
Norway (VG-lista)	1
Portugal (AFP)	2
Spain (PROMUSICAE)	1
Sweden (Sverigetopplistan)	1
Switzerland (Swiss Hitparade)	1
United Kingdom (UK Music Video Charts)	1
United States (Billboard Charts)	2

== Certifications ==
Audio

Region	Certification	Certified units/sales
Argentina (CAPIF)	Gold	30,000^{^}
Austria (IFPI Austria)	Gold	25,000^{*}
Canada (Music Canada)	2× Platinum	200,000^{^}
Germany (BVMI)	Gold	250,000^{^}
New Zealand (RMNZ)	Gold	7,500^{^}
Sweden (GLF)	Gold	50,000^{^}
United Kingdom (BPI)	Gold	100,000^{^}
United States (RIAA)	Platinum	1,000,000^{^}
^{*} Sales figures based on certification alone.^{^} Shipments figures based on certification alone.

1985 VHS

Region	Certification	Certified units/sales
Canada (Music Canada)	2× Platinum	20,000^{^}
United States (RIAA)	Platinum	100,000^{^}
^{*} Sales figures based on certification alone.^{^} Shipments figures based on certification alone.

2008 DVD

Region	Certification	Certified units/sales
Argentina (CAPIF)	Platinum	8,000^{^}
Australia (ARIA)	Platinum	15,000^{^}
Finland (Musiikkituottajat)	Gold	6,831
Germany (BVMI)	Gold	25,000^{^}
United Kingdom (BPI)	Gold	25,000^{^}
United States (RIAA)	Platinum	100,000^{^}
^{*} Sales figures based on certification alone.^{^} Shipments figures based on certification alone.
