= Dennis Stratton =

British guitarist (born 1952)

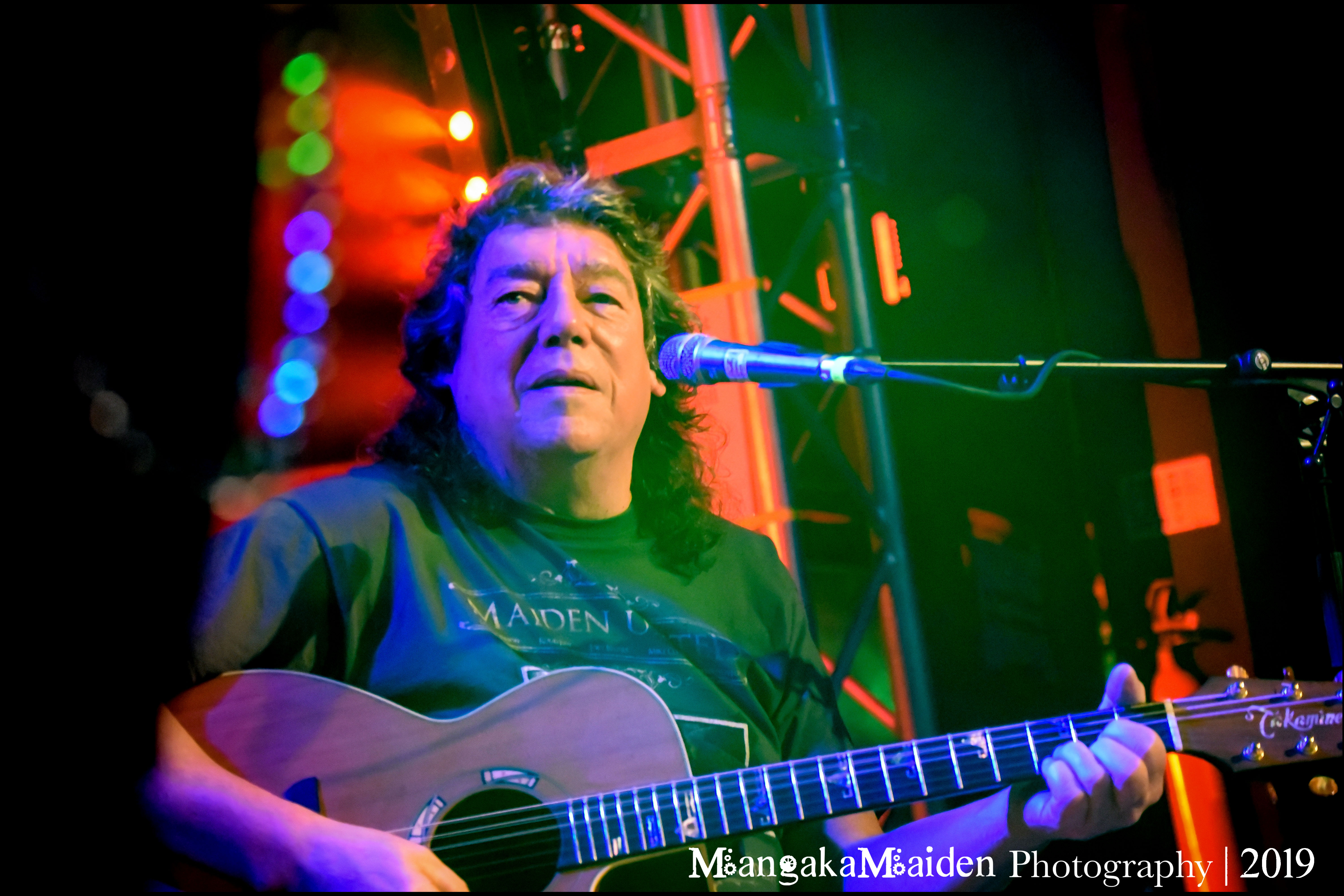
- Stratton performing with Maiden uniteD in 2019

Background information
- Also known as: Den
- Born: 9 October 1952 (age 74); London, England
- Genres: Heavy metal; hard rock; progressive rock
- Occupation: Musician
- Instruments: Guitar; vocals
- Years active: 1969–present
- Formerly of: Iron Maiden; Praying Mantis

Dennis Stratton (born 9 October 1952) is an English guitarist best known as a member of the heavy metal band Iron Maiden from December 1979 to October 1980. He was also the lead guitarist and occasional lead vocalist of Praying Mantis from 1990 to 2006, recording six studio albums with the band.

== Career ==
Born in Canning Town, London, Stratton showed early promise as a footballer and was briefly on the books at West Ham United until age 16, when he took up guitar. He joined his first band Harvest (later known as Wedgewood) in 1973. Two years later, Stratton formed the band Remus Down Boulevard, which toured in support of Rory Gallagher and Status Quo, and recorded a live album with music producer Jonathan King.

In December 1979, Steve Harris invited Stratton to join Iron Maiden after witnessing a Remus Down Boulevard performance. The band was also in need of a new drummer, and recruited Clive Burr on Stratton's recommendation. Stratton played on the group's first studio album, Iron Maiden, which was released in April 1980, and on the non-album single "Women in Uniform". Stratton also appeared in the home video recording "Live at the Ruskin" (recorded in 1980 and released in 2004 as part of The History of Iron Maiden – Part 1: The Early Days DVD set), and in the band's first British television appearance, when they performed "Running Free" on Top of the Pops. Stratton was with the band during their first European tour, supporting Kiss.

Dennis Stratton left Iron Maiden in October 1980, and has stated that he left due to conflicts with Steve Harris and band manager Rod Smallwood. Officially, the band stated "musical differences" as the reason for Stratton's departure. He was replaced by Adrian Smith. After his departure from Iron Maiden, Stratton played with bands such as Lionheart and Praying Mantis, with which he recorded six studio albums from 1990 to 2003. He officially left Praying Mantis in 2006. In 1995 he formed a project called The Original Iron Men with another former Iron Maiden member, singer Paul Di'Anno. The duo released three albums. More recently, Stratton still performs locally in the East London area, sometimes with a reformed version of Remus Down Boulevard, and occasionally tours Europe with various cover bands that play classic Iron Maiden songs. Stratton is endorsed by Caparison Guitars, from his tenure with Praying Mantis. He will be inducted in the Rock and Roll Hall of Fame in November 2026 as a member of Iron Maiden.

== Discography ==
=== Remus Down Boulevard ===
- Live - A Week at the Bridge E16 (Sampler, 1978)
- Live EP at the Bridge E16 (Sampler, 2002)
- The Bridge House - Book Launch & Reunion (DVD, 2007)
- Live - Worth the Wait (4th Time Lucky) (CD/DVD, 2011)

=== Iron Maiden ===
- Iron Maiden (1980)
- Live!! +one (1980)
- 12 Wasted Years (1987)
- The First Ten Years (From There to Eternity) (1990)
- Best of the Beast (1996)
- Ed Hunter (1999)
- BBC Archives (2002)
- Best of the 'B' Sides (2002)
- The History of Iron Maiden – Part 1: The Early Days (2004)
- The Essential Iron Maiden (2005)

=== Lionheart ===
- Hot Tonight (1984)
- Second Nature (2017)

=== Praying Mantis ===
- Live at Last (live) (1990)
- Predator in Disguise (1991)
- A Cry for the New World (1993)
- Only the Children Cry (EP) (1993)
- Play in the East (live) (1994)
- To the Power of Ten (1995)
- Captured Alive in Tokyo City (live) (1996)
- Forever in Time (1998)
- Nowhere to Hide (2000)
- The Journey Goes On (2003)
- Captured alive in Tokyo City (Live-DVD)
- The Best of Praying Mantis (2004) (Best-of Compilation)

=== Paul Di'Anno & Dennis Stratton ===
- The Original Iron Men (1995)
- The Original Iron Men 2 (1996)
- As Hard As Iron (1996)
- Made In Iron (1997)

=== Collaborations ===
- Kaizoku (1989) - Various Authors
- All Stars (1990) - Various Authors
- Trapped (1990) - Lea Hart
- Start 'em Young (1992) - English Steel
- Ready to rumble (1992) - True Brits
