= Maiden Japan =

Live album by Iron Maiden
- Released: 14 September 1981
- Recorded: 23 May 1981
- Venues: Aichi Kōsei Nenkin Kaikan, Nagoya, Japan
- Genre: Heavy metal
- Length: 16:38
- Label: EMI
- Producers: Iron Maiden; Doug Hall

Iron Maiden chronology
Killers (1981)	Maiden Japan (1981)	The Number of the Beast (1982)

Alternative cover
- Brazilian and Venezuelan alternate cover

Professional ratings
Review scores
Source	Rating
AllMusic	2/5 stars
Collector's Guide to Heavy Metal	6/10

Maiden Japan, released as Heavy Metal Army in Japan, is a live EP by the British heavy metal band Iron Maiden. The title is a pun of Deep Purple's live album Made in Japan.

== Release ==
There are at least two different versions of this EP; all tracks were recorded at the Aichi Kosei Nenkin Kaikan in Chikusa-ku, Nagoya, Aichi, Japan on 23 May 1981. It was lead singer Paul Di'Anno's final recording with the band. The original Japanese pressing features only 4 tracks and the record speed is 45 rpm, but the other version has 5 tracks. It was never the band's intention to release this album, but Toshiba-EMI wanted a live album.

The EP has been officially reissued on CD twice — the four-track version was included as part of the singles box set The First Ten Years, released in 1990, while the five-track version was included on the bonus disc that came with the 1995 reissue of Killers in the US (the European release did not include the Maiden Japan tracks).

== Cover art ==
The original cover depicted the band's mascot, Eddie, holding the severed head of singer Paul Di'Anno. The replacement cover was done on very short notice after Iron Maiden's manager, Rod Smallwood, received a proof for review, and became agitated at Di'Anno's depiction because the band was looking to replace him. Maiden Japan was released in Brazil (in 1981 & a 1985 re-issue) & Venezuela (in 1987) with the original cover and have become collector's items.

== Accolades ==
The Rolling Stone Italia named Maiden Japan EP as "The most important and the best metal's live EPs ever". Ultimate Classic Rock placed Maiden Japan on Top 40 Best 1981 Albums List. Maiden Japan EP went platinum in Canada and made it to the charts in many other countries around the world.

== Track listing ==
Production and performance credits are adapted from the EP liner notes.

=== European and Japanese edition ===
All tracks are written by Steve Harris and Paul Di'Anno, except where noted.

Side one
No.	Title	Length
1.	"Running Free"	2:48
2.	"Remember Tomorrow"	5:27

Side two
No.	Title	Writer(s)	Length
3.	"Killers"		4:39
4.	"Innocent Exile"	Harris	3:44
Total length:			16:38

=== International edition ===
Side one
No.	Title	Length
1.	"Running Free"	2:48
2.	"Remember Tomorrow"	5:27

Side two
No.	Title	Writer(s)	Length
3.	"Wrathchild"	Harris	2:52
4.	"Killers"		4:39
5.	"Innocent Exile"	Harris	3:44
Total length:			19:30

== Personnel ==
- Paul Di'Anno – lead vocals
- Dave Murray – guitar
- Adrian Smith – guitar, backing vocals
- Steve Harris – bass, backing vocals
- Clive Burr – drums

=== Production ===
- Doug Hall – producer, engineer
- Hiro Ohno – photography
- Rod Smallwood – management, photography

== Chart performance ==
Title	Chart (1981)	Peak position
"Maiden Japan"	UK Singles Chart	43
"Maiden Japan"	Billboard 200	89
Title	Chart (1990)	Peak position
"Purgatory / Maiden Japan"	UK Albums Chart (Note: Re-release of both titles as part of "The First Ten Years" box set. Exceeded the length limit of the UK Singles chart.)	5

== Certifications ==
Region	Certification	Certified units/sales
Canada (Music Canada)	Platinum	100,000^{^}
^{^} Shipments figures based on certification alone.
