= Video Pieces =

Video by Iron Maiden
- Released: September 1983
- Recorded: 1982–1983
- Genre: Heavy metal
- Length: 16:46
- Label: PMI
- Director: David Mallet
- Producer: Martin Birch

Iron Maiden video chronology
Live at the Rainbow (1981)	Video Pieces (1983)	Behind the Iron Curtain (1984)

Professional ratings
Review scores
Source	Rating
AllMusic	4/5 stars

Video Pieces was a home video released in 1983 on VHS, Betamax, LaserDisc, Video 8 and the Japan-only VHD format. This release contains four promotional videos by the heavy metal band Iron Maiden. This is one of the few Iron Maiden released videos to not feature Eddie the Head on the cover.

== Track listing ==
Songs
No.	Title	Writer(s)	Original Release	Length
1.	"Run to the Hills"	Steve Harris	1982 ~ The Number of the Beast
2.	"The Number of the Beast"	Harris	1982 ~ The Number of the Beast
3.	"Flight of Icarus"	Adrian Smith, Bruce Dickinson	1983 ~ Piece of Mind
4.	"The Trooper"	Harris	1983 ~ Piece of Mind

== Personnel ==
- Bruce Dickinson – vocals
- Dave Murray – guitar
- Adrian Smith – guitar
- Steve Harris – bass
- Clive Burr – drums (on "The Number of the Beast" and "Run to the Hills")
- Nicko McBrain – drums (on "Flight of Icarus" and "The Trooper")
