= Live at the Rainbow =

Video by Iron Maiden
- Released: 11 May 1981
- Recorded: 21 December 1980
- Venue: Rainbow Theatre, London
- Genre: Heavy metal
- Length: 30:00 (approx.)
- Label: PMI
- Director: David G. Hillier
- Producer: Frank Mullan; Alan More

Iron Maiden chronology
Live at the Rainbow (1981)	Video Pieces (1983)

Live at the Rainbow is the first live video recorded by Iron Maiden on 21 December 1980 and released in 1981. It includes one of the band's earliest concerts with guitarist Adrian Smith as well as a very early version of "Killers", with lyrics that differ from the album version that would be released in 1981. Paul Di'Anno later claimed to have written the lyrics five minutes before going on stage that night. This has been debunked as the same lyrics were performed by the band at the Reading Festival in August 1980.

Due to technical problems, a sound line broke down halfway through the show. As a result, the audience were allowed to stay after the show to watch the band perform "Iron Maiden" and "Phantom of the Opera" again for the recording.

This concert is included on disc 1 of The History of Iron Maiden – Part 1: The Early Days.

In addition, the cuts "Iron Maiden" and "Wrathchild" from this video received heavy rotation on MTV during its first hours on the air.

== Track listing ==
All tracks are written by Steve Harris, except where noted.

1. "The Ides of March" (intro) – 0:38
2. "Wrathchild" – 2:59
3. "Killers" (Harris, Paul Di'Anno) – 5:12
4. "Remember Tomorrow" (Harris, Di'Anno) – 5:25
5. "Transylvania" (instrumental) – 3:51
6. "Phantom of the Opera" – 6:54
7. "Iron Maiden" – 4:57

== Credits ==
- Paul Di'Anno – vocals
- Dave Murray – guitar
- Adrian Smith – guitar
- Steve Harris – bass guitar
- Clive Burr – drums
