= Gogmagog =

Gogmagog may refer to:

- Gogmagog (band), a British supergroup
- Gogmagog (giant), a giant in British folklore
- Gog Magog Hills
- Gog and Magog
