= The History of Iron Maiden – Part 1: The Early Days =

Video by Iron Maiden
- Released: 8 November 2004
- Recorded: 1980–83
- Genre: Heavy metal
- Length: 4:30:00
- Label: EMI
- Director: Matthew Amos

Iron Maiden chronology
Visions of the Beast (2003)	The History of Iron Maiden – Part 1: The Early Days (2004)	Death on the Road (2006)

The History of Iron Maiden – Part 1: The Early Days is a DVD video by Iron Maiden, released in 2004. It features the first part of The History of Iron Maiden series, a 90-minute documentary which describes their beginnings in London's East End in 1975 through to the Piece of Mind album and tour in 1983. The set also features a large collection of rare videos and concert footage, as well as interviews with former members such as Paul Di'Anno, Clive Burr, Dennis Stratton, Dave Sullivan, Terry Rance, Doug Sampson, Ron Matthews, Terry Wapram and Bob Sawyer. The DVD won a 2004 Metal Edge Readers' Choice Award for Home Video/DVD of the Year.

The second part of the History of Iron Maiden series was later included on the Live After Death DVD release in 2008, while a third instalment was released as part of the Maiden England '88 DVD in 2013.

== Critical reception ==
Professional ratings
Review scores
Source	Rating
AllMusic	4.5/5 stars
Classic Rock	5/5 stars
Kerrang!	5/5

The Early Days was met with critical acclaim, with AllMusic describing it as "A masterpiece." Classic Rock gave the DVD 5 out of 5, calling the live footage "fascinating," while stating that "the tales of Maiden's early birth pains are utterly compelling." Kerrang! also gave it full marks, describing the feature documentary as "a brilliantly realised and completely absorbing ride from the downtrodden boozers of East London to the heady heights of a Number One album and massive world tours" and the concerts as "magnificently rendered to DVD," overall deeming the release "Awesome and unmissable."

== Track listing ==
=== Disc one ===
==== Live at the Rainbow (21 December 1980) ====
1. "The Ides of March"
2. "Wrathchild"
3. "Killers"
4. "Remember Tomorrow"
5. "Transylvania"
6. "Phantom of the Opera"
7. "Iron Maiden"

==== Beast over Hammersmith (20 March 1982) ====
1. "Murders in the Rue Morgue"
2. "Run to the Hills"
3. "Children of the Damned"
4. "The Number of the Beast"
5. "22 Acacia Avenue"
6. "Total Eclipse"
7. "The Prisoner"
8. "Hallowed Be Thy Name"
9. "Iron Maiden"

==== Live in Dortmund (18 December 1983) ====
1. "Sanctuary"
2. "The Trooper"
3. "Revelations"
4. "Flight of Icarus"
5. "22 Acacia Avenue"
6. "The Number of the Beast"
7. "Run to the Hills"

=== Disc two ===
==== The History of Iron Maiden - Part. 1: The Early Days ====
(90 minutes)

- Feature-length documentary.

==== 20th Century Box ====
(20 minutes)

- Rare TV documentary from 1981

==== Live at the Ruskin Arms (1980) ====
(45 minutes)

1. "Sanctuary"
2. "Wrathchild"
3. "Prowler"
4. "Remember Tomorrow"
5. "Running Free"
6. "Transylvania"
7. "Another Life"
8. "Phantom of the Opera"
9. "Charlotte the Harlot"

==== Extras ====
(40 minutes)

1. "Running Free" (Live on Top of the Pops, 22 February 1980)
2. "Women in Uniform" (Live on Top of the Pops, 13 November 1980)
3. "Running Free" (Live on Rock and Pop, Germany, 1980)

==== Promo Videos ====
1. "Women in Uniform"
2. "Run to the Hills"
3. "The Number of the Beast"
4. "Flight of Icarus"
5. "The Trooper"
- In addition, the DVD set includes a photo gallery featuring more than 150 pictures, images and artwork, full tour listings, discography and tour programmes.

== Personnel ==
Production and performance credits are adapted from the DVD liner notes.

Iron Maiden

- Steve Harris – bass guitar, photography
- Dave Murray – guitars
- Bruce Dickinson – lead vocals (Beast over Hammersmith, Live in Dortmund)
- Paul Di'Anno – lead vocals (Live at the Rainbow, Live at the Ruskin Arms)
- Adrian Smith – guitars (except Live at the Ruskin Arms)
- Dennis Stratton – guitars (Live at the Ruskin Arms)
- Clive Burr – drums (except Live in Dortmund)
- Nicko McBrain – drums (Live in Dortmund)

Production

- Matthew Amos – director (The Early Days)
- Joe Abercrombie – editor (The Early Days)
- MJ Morgan – producer (The Early Days)
- Tessa Watts – executive producer (The Early Days)
- Doug Hall – producer (Live at the Rainbow, Beast Over Hammersmith)
- Peacock – sleeve illustration, sleeve design
- Ross Halfin – photography
- Rod Smallwood – management, photography
- Andy Taylor – management
- Merck Mercuriadis – management

== Chart performance ==
Country	Chart (2004)	Peak position
Australia	ARIA Charts	32
Finland	Official Finnish Charts	1
Germany	Media Control Charts	76
Netherlands	MegaCharts	23
Norway	VG-lista	2
Portugal	AFP	12
Spain	PROMUSICAE	1
United Kingdom	UK Video Charts	3

== Certifications ==
Region	Certification	Certified units/sales
Argentina (CAPIF)	Platinum	8,000^{^}
Australia (ARIA)	Gold	7,500^{^}
Canada (Music Canada)	2× Platinum	20,000^{^}
Finland (Musiikkituottajat)	Platinum	12,940
France (SNEP)	Gold	10,000^{*}
Spain (Promusicae)	Gold	10,000^{^}
United Kingdom (BPI)	Gold	25,000^{^}
United States (RIAA)	Platinum	50,000^{^}
^{*} Sales figures based on certification alone.^{^} Shipments figures based on certification alone.
