= Behind the Iron Curtain (video) =

Video by Iron Maiden
- Released: October 1984
- Recorded: August 1984
- Genre: Heavy metal
- Length: 30:00 (approx.)
- Label: PMI
- Director: Kenny Feuerman
- Producer: Kenny Feuerman; Martin Birch

Iron Maiden chronology
Video Pieces (1983)	Behind the Iron Curtain (1984)	Live After Death (1985)

Professional ratings
Review scores
Source	Rating
AllMusic	3/5 stars

Behind the Iron Curtain is a discontinued VHS/Beta/LaserDisc/VHD video by the English band Iron Maiden. The video features footage of the band on the road in Eastern Europe in 1984, performing concerts in Poland, Hungary, and Yugoslavia as part of the World Slavery Tour. The title refers to the fact that the band were touring inside the Iron Curtain (countries within the Eastern Bloc of the Soviet Union); unusual given the East bloc's separation from the West due to the then-ongoing Cold War. Aside from two promotional videos from the album Powerslave, the video also contains two live tracks and interviews with band members.

The video has no MPAA rating and has a running length of 30 minutes. An expanded 58 minute version of the documentary is included on disc 2 of the Live After Death DVD. This expanded version was broadcast by MTV in 1984 and was, until then, only available on several bootleg recordings. Analysis of the tracks revealed that the audio of the tracks on the original video differ from the audio of the expanded documentary on the DVD version.

The video was produced and directed by Kenneth Feuerman and edited by Norman H. Strassner.

== Track listing ==
=== Original video version ===
All tracks by Steve Harris except where noted.

Songs
No.	Title	Writer(s)	Original Release	Length
1.	"2 Minutes to Midnight" (Promo Video)	Adrian Smith, Bruce Dickinson	1984 ~ Powerslave
2.	"Aces High" (Promo Video)		1984 ~ Powerslave
3.	"Hallowed Be Thy Name" (14 August 1984)		1982 ~ The Number of the Beast
4.	"Run to the Hills" (17 August 1984)		1982 ~ The Number of the Beast

The video also features a portion of the Deep Purple classic "Smoke on the Water" which Iron Maiden played at event manager Dorota Nawrocka and dentist Piotr Zmudzinski's wedding at the now-demolished Adria club in Poznań, Poland.

=== Expanded MTV documentary version ===
Songs
No.	Title	Writer(s)	Original Release	Length
1.	"Aces High" (Unknown Date)		1984 ~ Powerslave
2.	"The Trooper" (11 August 1984)		1983 ~ Piece of Mind
3.	"22 Acacia Avenue" (Unknown Date)	Harris, Smith	1982 ~ The Number of the Beast
4.	"The Number of the Beast" (11 August 1984)		1982 ~ The Number of the Beast
5.	"Hallowed Be Thy Name" (11 August 1984)		1982 ~ The Number of the Beast
6.	"2 Minutes to Midnight" (17 August 1984)	Smith, Dickinson	1984 ~ Powerslave
7.	"Run to the Hills" (17 August 1984)		1982 ~ The Number of the Beast

== Personnel ==
- Bruce Dickinson – vocals
- Dave Murray – guitar
- Adrian Smith – guitar, backing vocals
- Steve Harris – bass, backing vocals
- Nicko McBrain – drums

== Certifications ==
Region	Certification	Certified units/sales
United States (RIAA)	Gold	50,000^{^}
^{^} Shipments figures based on certification alone.
