= Iron Maiden (album) =

Studio album by Iron Maiden
- Released: 11 April 1980
- Recorded: December 1979 – January 1980
- Studio: Kingsway (London)
- Genre: Heavy metal
- Length: 37:39
- Label: EMI
- Producer: Wil Malone

Iron Maiden chronology
The Soundhouse Tapes (1979)	Iron Maiden (1980)	Live!! +one (1980)

Alternative cover
- 1998 remastered edition

Singles from Iron Maiden
- 1. "Running Free" Released: 8 February 1980; 2. "Sanctuary" Released: 23 May 1980

Iron Maiden is the debut studio album by English heavy metal band Iron Maiden, released on 11 April 1980 by EMI Records in the UK and Harvest and Capitol Records in the US. The North American version included the song "Sanctuary", released in the UK as a non-album single. In 1998, along with the rest of the band's pre-1995 releases, Iron Maiden was remastered with "Sanctuary" added in all territories. However, 2014 vinyl reissues, 2015 digital releases and 2018 CD reissues use the original track listing across the globe. It is the band's only album to feature guitarist Dennis Stratton.

Although Iron Maiden have since criticised the quality of the album's production, the release was met with critical and commercial success, peaking at number four on the UK Albums Chart and helping the band achieve prominence in mainland Europe.

== Background ==
This is the band's only album produced by Wil Malone (credited as Will Malone), whom Iron Maiden have since claimed lacked interest in the project and effectively left them to produce most of the album themselves, which, according to bassist Steve Harris, was completed in just 13 days. Recording took place at Kingsway Studios, west London in January 1980, with the band taking time out from the 1980 Metal for Muthas Tour to complete the final mixes at Morgan Studios, northwest London in February. Before the sessions with Malone, the band made two attempts in December 1979 with two different producers while still a four-piece. Guy Edwards, the first, was dismissed as the band were unhappy with the "muddy" quality in his production, while Andy Scott was also dismissed after insisting Harris play his bass with a pick rather than his fingers. After these efforts, the band decided not to dismiss Malone as Harris described that they could "bypass him and [go] to the engineer". The group criticised the quality of the production, although many fans still preferred the raw quality of the sound recording. Although AllMusic stated that this style was "clearly drawing from elements of punk rock", Harris stated that the band despised everything about punk.

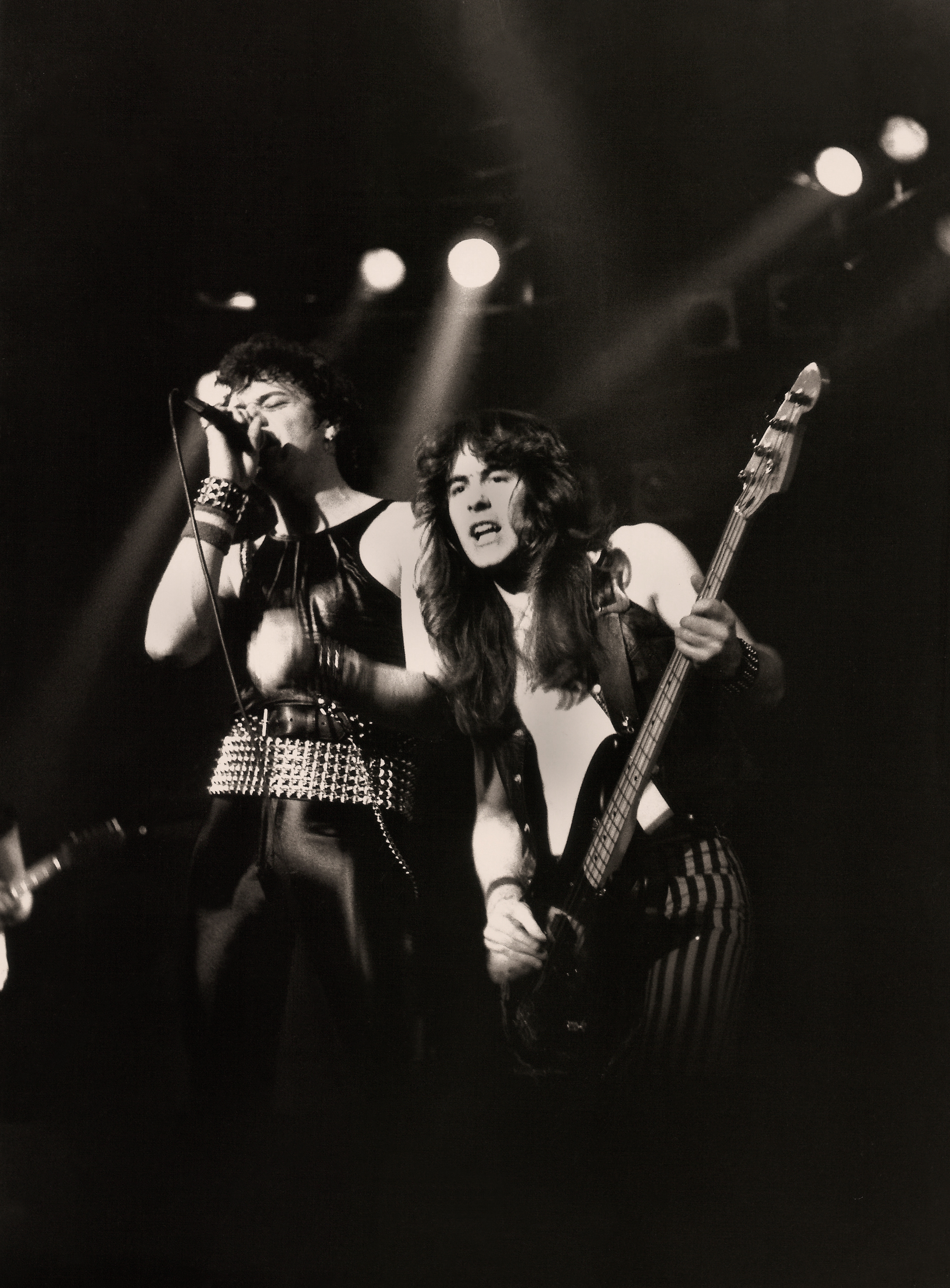
Di'Anno (left) and Harris (right) performing in 1980.

This was also the only studio album with guitarist Dennis Stratton, who, having been brought in as a last-minute placement, was dismissed due to "musical differences" after the band's European tour in support of Kiss. Suspicions were first raised during Iron Maiden's recording, when Stratton added Wishbone Ash-esque harmony guitars and backing vocals reminiscent of Queen to "Phantom of the Opera", of which Harris and manager Rod Smallwood immediately disapproved and had removed. Although Stratton stated that he was not "trying to push the band in a new direction", Harris commented that it "really pointed up the difference between Den and us", after which he began to notice that "Dennis was so much more into playing stuff like "Strange World" than he was "Iron Maiden" or "Prowler", because it was more slow, melodic ... when he was soloing on one of the heavier songs, it wasn't with quite the same passion". The album cover, marking the debut of Eddie after his face was obscured in the "Running Free" single, has in the background Endymion Road at Finsbury Park, near where artist Derek Riggs lived.

The 1998 remastered album differs from the original with the addition of the song "Sanctuary", which had then been released only as a single in the UK in May 1980, although it did also appear in the later US version of Iron Maiden, which was issued in August 1980. The track originally appeared on the Metal for Muthas compilation, but was re-recorded during the Iron Maiden sessions. The re-release also features a different cover; a digital recreation by Riggs, with a portion of the original artwork instead being used on the disc itself.

The band undertook the Iron Maiden Tour in support of the album, during which they played their first concerts in mainland Europe, where they were surprised to discover how successful Iron Maiden had been outside the UK. Steve Harris commented, "The prestige of doing so well in the UK had turned into a sort of word-of-mouth thing, and we'd turn up in places like Leiden, in Holland, places we'd never even heard of, and they'd have these massive banners waiting for us with 'Iron Maiden Go Over The Top' written on them and all this. It was unreal."

== Songs ==
"Running Free" was released as a single on 8 February 1980, reaching No. 34 in the UK Singles Chart. The band also performed the song on the UK TV show Top of the Pops, refusing the usual tradition for artists to mime and thus becoming the first group to perform live on the show since The Who in 1972. Vocalist Paul Di'Anno, who wrote the song's lyrics, describes it as "a very autobiographical song, though of course I've never spent the night in an LA jail. It's about being 16 and, like it says, just running wild and running free. It comes from my days as a skinhead." According to Classic Rock and Metal Hammer contributor Dave Ling, writing in the Metal for Muthas CD re-issue liner notes, "Sanctuary" was originally penned by guitarist Rob Angelo (Bob Sawyer), a member of Iron Maiden in 1977, who was paid £300 for the song's rights. The "Sanctuary" single was released on 7 June 1980 and charted at No. 29, with the censored cover of Eddie, the band's mascot, standing over Margaret Thatcher's body earning the band publicity in the British press. Managers Rod Smallwood and Andy Taylor's management company would be named after the song.

Although "Strange World" is credited solely to Harris, Paul Mario Day, the band's original vocalist from 1975 to 1976, asserted that he also contributed to the song.

"Charlotte the Harlot", their only song to have been credited to Dave Murray alone, is the first of four Iron Maiden tracks about the fictional prostitute "Charlotte", although Murray states it was "based on a true story". The 7-minute "Phantom of the Opera" is one of Harris's favourites and is still performed live relatively frequently. With many mood and time-changes, Harris marks it as "the first song I'd written that was a bit more proggy". "Transylvania" is an instrumental piece composed by Harris, which was later covered by Iced Earth on the album Horror Show.

Of all the album's songs, "Phantom of the Opera", "Running Free", "Sanctuary" and "Iron Maiden" are the most frequently played in the band's concert tours, with the last being played at every show since the band's inception and signalling the arrival of Eddie onstage. All of the album's songs, excluding "Strange World", have been re-recorded with Bruce Dickinson on vocals, either on live albums, studio B-Sides or both. "Strange World" and "Transylvania" were the only songs not played on the "Eddie Rips Up the World Tour", 2005.

Four songs from the album ("Phantom of the Opera", "Remember Tomorrow", "Strange World" and "Transylvania") were covered for the 1998 tribute album A Call to Irons (A Tribute To Iron Maiden), recorded by New Eden, Opeth, Evoken and Absu respectively. Four songs ("Prowler", "Remember Tomorrow", "Running Free" and "Iron Maiden") were covered for the 2008 tribute album Maiden Heaven: A Tribute to Iron Maiden released by Kerrang! magazine, and an acoustic reinterpretation of "Prowler" was included in 2012's Across The Seventh Sea by the acoustic Iron Maiden tribute project Maiden uniteD. Metallica drummer Lars Ulrich affirmed that "Remember Tomorrow" was "basically the blueprint for songs like Fade To Black and Welcome Home (Sanitarium), and some of the more epic ballady type of songs that Metallica had done later".

== Reception ==
Professional ratings
Review scores
Source	Rating
AllMusic	4.5/5 stars
Collector's Guide to Heavy Metal	9/10
Music Week	4/4 stars
Pitchfork	7.0/10
Record Mirror	5/5 stars
Sounds	4/5 stars
Sputnikmusic	4.5/5 stars

On its release, the album received immediate critical acclaim. Geoff Barton, in Sounds, hailed it as "Heavy metal for the '80s, its blinding speed and rampant ferocity making most plastic heavy rock tracks from the '60s and '70s sound sloth-like and funeral-dirgey by comparison". Iron Maiden spent an initial fifteen weeks on the UK chart, and a further two when it was reissued on EMI's budget subsidiary Fame in 1985.

The album has continued to receive praise from reviewers. AllMusic proclaims that it "would still rank as a landmark even if the Dickinson years had never happened" and says there was "no better place to hear how both punk and prog rock informed the new wave of British heavy metal". Sputnikmusic describes it as "one of the top debut albums in the world of heavy metal", containing "the raw, aggressive power [that] defines the early years of the band".

Iron Maiden is one of the band's two albums listed in Robert Dimery's 1001 Albums You Must Hear Before You Die (The Number of the Beast is the other). In 2017, it was ranked 13th on Rolling Stone's list of "100 Greatest Metal Albums of All Time".

== Track listing ==
All tracks are written by Steve Harris, except where noted.

Side one
No.	Title	Writer(s)	Length
1.	"Prowler"		3:56
2.	"Remember Tomorrow"	Harris; Paul Di'Anno	5:30
3.	"Running Free"	Harris; Di'Anno	3:22
4.	"Phantom of the Opera"		7:02

Side two
No.	Title	Writer(s)	Length
5.	"Transylvania" (instrumental)		4:09
6.	"Strange World"		5:43
7.	"Charlotte the Harlot"	Dave Murray	4:14
8.	"Iron Maiden"		3:43
Total length:			37:39

Side two – North American edition
No.	Title	Writer(s)	Length
5.	"Transylvania" (instrumental)		4:09
6.	"Strange World"		5:43
7.	"Sanctuary"	Iron Maiden	3:19
8.	"Charlotte the Harlot"	Murray	4:14
9.	"Iron Maiden"		3:43
Total length:			40:58

1995 reissue bonus disc
No.	Title	Writer(s)	Length
1.	"Sanctuary"	Iron Maiden	3:14
2.	"Burning Ambition"		2:42
3.	"Drifter" (live)		6:04
4.	"I've Got the Fire" (Montrose cover; live)	Ronnie Montrose	3:14
Total length:			15:14

1998 remastered edition
No.	Title	Writer(s)	Length
1.	"Prowler"		3:56
2.	"Sanctuary"	Harris; Murray; Di'Anno	3:16
3.	"Remember Tomorrow"	Harris; Di'Anno	5:29
4.	"Running Free"	Harris; Di'Anno	3:17
5.	"Phantom of the Opera"		7:08
6.	"Transylvania" (instrumental)		4:19
7.	"Strange World"		5:32
8.	"Charlotte the Harlot"	Murray	4:13
9.	"Iron Maiden"		3:36
Total length:			40:46

- On the 1998 remastered releases, the coda to "Phantom of the Opera" was cut and the intro to "Strange World" was moved to the end of "Transylvania".
- Some versions of the 1998 remastered releases also incorrectly list the running time for "Sanctuary" as 0:00.
- The US version of the 1995 reissue bonus disc excludes "Sanctuary", as it already appears on the main track listing.

== Personnel ==
Production and performance credits are adapted from the album liner notes.

=== Iron Maiden ===
- Paul Di'Anno – lead vocals
- Dave Murray – guitar
- Dennis Stratton – guitar, backing vocals
- Steve Harris – bass guitar, backing vocals
- Clive Burr – drums

=== Technical personnel ===
- Wil Malone – producer
- Martin Levan – engineer
- Derek Riggs – sleeve illustration
- Terry Walker – photography
- Yuka Fujii – photography
- Simon Heyworth – remastering (1998 edition)
- Robert Ellis – photography (1998 edition)
- George Chin – photography (1998 edition)
- P.G. Brunelli – photography (1998 edition)
- Ross Halfin – photography (1998 edition)
- Denis O'Regan – photography (1998 edition)

== Charts ==
Chart (1980)	Peak position
French Albums (SNEP)	10
Swedish Albums (Sverigetopplistan)	36
UK Albums (Official Charts)	4

Chart (2006)	Peak position
Italian Albums (FIMI)	68

Chart (2009–2010)	Peak position
Greek Albums (IFPI)	52
Swedish Albums (Sverigetopplistan)	27

Chart (2013)	Peak position
French Albums (SNEP)	98

Chart (2020–2021)	Peak position
Belgian Albums (Ultratop Wallonia)	31
German Albums (Offizielle Top 100)	34
Hungarian Albums (MAHASZ)	21
Portuguese Albums (AFP)	40
Scottish Albums (Official Charts)	5
Spanish Albums (Promusicae)	51
Swiss Albums (Schweizer Hitparade)	38
UK Rock & Metal Albums (Official Charts)	1

== Certifications ==
Region	Certification	Certified units/sales
Canada (Music Canada)	Platinum	100,000^{^}
Germany (BVMI)	Gold	250,000^{^}
Japan (RIAJ)	Gold	100,000
United Kingdom (BPI)	Platinum	300,000^{^}
^{^} Shipments figures based on certification alone.

== Literature ==
- Wall, Mick (2004). Iron Maiden: Run to the Hills, the Authorised Biography (third ed.). Sanctuary Publishing. ISBN 1-86074-542-3.
