= Sanctuary (Iron Maiden song) =

- The censored version, with the face of Margaret Thatcher obscured

Single by Iron Maiden

from the album Iron Maiden
- A-side: "Prowler" (Dutch 12" only)
- B-side: "Drifter" (Live); "I've Got the Fire" (Live – Montrose cover)
- Released: 23 May 1980
- Recorded: December 1979
- Genre: Heavy metal
- Length: 3:12
- Label: EMI
- Songwriter: Iron Maiden
- Producer: Wil Malone

Iron Maiden singles chronology
"Running Free" (1980)	"Sanctuary" (1980)	"Women in Uniform" (1980)

Dutch 12" cover
- The uncensored version

"Sanctuary" is the second single released by the English heavy metal band Iron Maiden. Sanctuary was originally penned by guitarist Rob Angelo (Bob Sawyer), a member of Iron Maiden in 1977, who was paid £300 for the song's rights. The single was released on 23 May 1980. Although originally issued as a non-album single, the song was added to the later US release of their debut studio record, Iron Maiden (1980). When the album was re-released in 1998, the song was added in all territories. In 1990, it was reissued on CD and 12" vinyl in The First Ten Years box set, in which it was combined with their first single, "Running Free".

== History ==
The original mix of the song was recorded in November 1979 and originally appeared on the 1980 Metal for Muthas compilation, featuring several other artists associated with the new wave of British heavy metal, which the band recorded as a four-piece with Doug Sampson on drums. Although the compilation was panned in Sounds, Iron Maiden's songs were praised, with their contributions being described as "raucous heavy metal/punk crossovers and tantalising tasters for their own forthcoming album."

Already a regular in the band's live set, the "Sanctuary" single was released on 7" vinyl on 16 May during the UK leg of the Iron Maiden Tour. This version of the song was recorded during the Iron Maiden album sessions, and, according to guitarist Dave Murray, "was ten times better than the original Metal for Muthas version." The b-side includes two live songs recorded at the Marquee Club in London on 3 April 1980 – "Drifter" (which would feature on the band's next album, Killers) and a cover of Montrose's "I've Got the Fire". The live version of "Drifter" includes a crowd interaction part where the audience is invited to follow the lead singer as he chants "Yo Yo Yo", which parodies The Police's "Walking on the Moon". The single performed even better than their debut, "Running Free", entering the UK Singles Chart at No. 33 before peaking at No. 29 a week later.

Although the song is credited to Iron Maiden, according to Metal Hammer contributor Dave Ling, the song was originally written by guitarist Rob Angelo, a member of the band in 1977 who was paid £300 for the song's rights. From 1998 onwards, the song was credited to Murray, bassist Steve Harris and singer Paul Di'Anno.

== Artwork and controversy ==
The cover art caused controversy for the band as it depicted their mascot, Eddie, wielding a knife while crouching over the corpse of then-British prime minister Margaret Thatcher. The band's manager, Rod Smallwood, explained the artwork's concept: "The artwork is very tongue in cheek, as usual. At that time, Maggie had visited the old USSR and, following her tough stance with them, had been christened the Iron Maiden. Eddie took offence to this, and even more so when she started taking our posters." It was Smallwood himself who suggested to EMI that the cover be released with Thatcher's face censored "as this would give the tabloids an angle and draw attention to the single."

The attempt to gain coverage proved successful, with the Daily Mirror running a story about the single, as well as publishing the uncensored artwork, on 20 May under the headline: "It's murder! Maggie gets rock mugging." The Daily Record also published an article which deemed the cover "horrific," as well as included interviews with Young Scottish Conservatives who criticised the artwork for being "in very bad taste."

Thatcher also appeared in art for the band's next single, "Women in Uniform," in which she is shown seeking revenge on Eddie with a Sterling submachine gun.

== Track listing ==
7" UK single

Side one
No.	Title	Writer(s)	Length
1.	"Sanctuary"	Steve Harris, Dave Murray, Paul Di'Anno	3:16

Side two
No.	Title	Writer(s)	Length
2.	"Drifter" (Live at the Marquee, London, 3 April 1980)	Harris	6:03
3.	"I've Got the Fire" (Montrose cover) (Live at the Marquee, 3 April 1980)	Ronnie Montrose	3:13

12" Dutch Single

Side one
No.	Title	Writer(s)	Length
1.	"Sanctuary"	Harris, Murray, Di'Anno	3:16
2.	"Prowler"	Harris	3:56

Side two
No.	Title	Writer(s)	Length
3.	"Drifter" (Live at the Marquee, 3 April 1980)	Harris	6:03
4.	"I've Got the Fire" (Montrose cover) (Live at the Marquee, 3 April 1980)	Montrose	3:13

== Personnel ==
Production credits are adapted from the 7-inch vinyl cover.

Iron Maiden

- Paul Di'Anno – lead vocals
- Dave Murray – guitar
- Dennis Stratton – guitar
- Steve Harris – bass guitar
- Clive Burr – drums

Production

- Wil Malone – producer, engineer
- Derek Riggs – cover illustration

== Chart performance ==
=== Running Free ===
Chart (1980)	Peak position
UK Singles (Official Charts)	29

=== Running Free / Sanctuary ===
Chart (1990)	Peak position
UK Singles (Official Charts)	10
