= Running Free =

Single by Iron Maiden

from the album Iron Maiden
- B-side: "Burning Ambition"
- Released: 8 February 1980
- Recorded: December 1979-January 1980 ("Running Free") November 1979 ("Burning Ambition"); March 1985 ("Running Free" (live) & "Sanctuary" (live); October 1984 ("Murders in the Rue Morgue" (live)
- Genre: Heavy metal
- Length: 3:04; 3:26
- Label: EMI
- Songwriters: Steve Harris; Paul Di'Anno
- Producers: Will Malone; Martin Birch (1985 live single)

Iron Maiden singles chronology
"Running Free" (1980)	"Sanctuary" (1980)
"Aces High" (1984)	"Running Free (Live in 1985)" (1985)	"Run to the Hills (Live in 1985)" (1985)

1980 Japanese cover

1985 live cover

"Running Free" is the debut single by Iron Maiden, released on 8 February 1980 on the 7" 45 rpm vinyl record format. It was written by Steve Harris and Paul Di'Anno. The song appears as the third track on the band's self-titled debut album (and the fourth track on its 1998 re-release). In 1985, a live version of the song was released as the first single from Live After Death (the band's twelfth single). In 1990, the original single was reissued on CD and 12" vinyl as part of The First Ten Years box, in which it was combined with the band's next single, "Sanctuary". The 1985 live single was also released as part of this box set, combined with 1985's "Run to the Hills".

== Background ==
According to vocalist Paul Di'Anno, who wrote the song's lyrics, it is "a very autobiographical song, though of course I've never spent the night in an LA jail. It's about being 16 and, like it says, just running wild and running free. It comes from my days as a skinhead." The song is one of the band's more traditional rock numbers, which Mick Wall describes as "Iron Maiden at their punk-metal apotheosis," and is still performed live to this day.

The single's cover art is famously known as the first official appearance of Iron Maiden's mascot, Eddie, although his face is obscured as the band did not want him unveiled until the album's release. Several band names (such as Scorpions, Judas Priest, AC/DC, Sex Pistols and Led Zeppelin) are spray painted on the wall behind the youth in the picture, as well as the word "Hammers", a tribute to West Ham United, and "Vambo" which refers to The Sensational Alex Harvey Band.

The B-side "Burning Ambition", recorded in November 1979 at Wessex Studios with producer Guy Edwards as a 4-piece band just prior to hiring Dennis Stratton & Clive Burr, is one of Harris' earliest compositions written around the time he was in Gypsy's Kiss. It is one of the few recordings to feature Doug Sampson on drums, and the only one released by the band (demo versions of "Wrathchild" and "Sanctuary" with Sampson on drums were released on the NWOBHM compilation album Metal for Muthas). The guitar solo in this song is played by Dave Murray. The song did not appear on an album until it was included in the Best of the 'B' Sides compilation, released as part of the Eddie's Archive Boxset, and was featured in the soundtrack of The History of Iron Maiden – Part 1: The Early Days DVD documentary.

As an accident, the German and French pressings of the "Running Free" 7" contain the Running Free track from the Wessex Studio sessions with Doug Sampson on drums and only Dave Murray on guitar. That same version of "Running Free" also appeared on early pressings of the Axe Attack compilation album.

Iron Maiden's first single in Japan featured "Prowler" as the A-side and "Running Free" as the B-side. The cover used was the censored version of the "Sanctuary" single.

== Track listing ==
1980 7" UK single

Side one
No.	Title	Writer(s)	Length
1.	"Running Free"	Steve Harris, Paul Di'Anno	3:04

Side two
No.	Title	Writer(s)	Length
2.	"Burning Ambition"	Harris	2:39

7" Japanese single

Side one
No.	Title	Writer(s)	Length
1.	"Prowler"	Harris	3:55

Side two
No.	Title	Writer(s)	Length
2.	"Running Free"	Harris, Di'Anno	3:16

1985 7" Live single

Side one
No.	Title	Writer(s)	Length
1.	"Running Free" (Live at Long Beach Arena, California, America, 14–17 March 1985)	Harris, Di'Anno	3:26

Side two
No.	Title	Writer(s)	Length
2.	"Sanctuary" (Live at Long Beach Arena, California, America, 14–17 March 1985)	Harris, Dave Murray, Di'Anno,	4:38

1985 12" Live single

Side one
No.	Title	Writer(s)	Length
1.	"Running Free" (Live at Long Beach Arena, California, America, 14–17 March 1985)	Harris, Di'Anno	3:26

Side two
No.	Title	Writer(s)	Length
1.	"Sanctuary" (Live at Long Beach Arena, California, America, 14–17 March 1985)	Harris, Murray, Di'Anno	4:38
2.	"Murders in the Rue Morgue" (Live at Hammersmith Odeon, London, England, 12 October 1984)	Harris	4:30

== Personnel ==
=== 1980 single ===
Production credits are adapted from the 7-inch vinyl cover, and The First Ten Years CD re-release liner notes.

- Paul Di'Anno – lead vocals
- Dave Murray – guitar
- Dennis Stratton – guitar & backing vocals on "Running Free" only
- Steve Harris – bass guitar & backing vocals
- Clive Burr – drums on "Running Free" only
- Doug Sampson – drums on "Burning Ambition" only (And Running Free on the German and French pressings)

Production

- Wil Malone – producer
- Gary Edwards – producer ("Burning Ambition")
- Derek Riggs – cover illustration
- Ross Halfin – photography

=== 1985 live single ===
Production credits are adapted from the 12-inch vinyl cover.

Iron Maiden

- Bruce Dickinson – vocals
- Dave Murray – guitar
- Adrian Smith – guitar, backing vocals
- Steve Harris – bass guitar, backing vocals
- Nicko McBrain – drums

Production

- Martin Birch – producer, engineer, mixing
- Ross Halfin – photography

== Chart performance ==
=== Running Free ===
Chart (1980)	Peak position
New Zealand (Recorded Music NZ)	35
UK Singles (Official Charts)	34

Chart (2014)	Peak position
France (SNEP)	144

=== Running Free (live) ===
Chart (1985)	Peak position
Ireland (IRMA)	12
UK Singles (Official Charts)	19

=== Running Free / Sanctuary ===
Chart (1990)	Peak position
UK Singles (Official Charts)	10

=== Running Free (Live) / Run to the Hills (Live) ===
Chart (1990)	Peak position
UK Singles (Official Charts)	9
