= Gogmagog (band) =

1985 British rock band

- Origin: Barnet, London, England
- Genres: Hard Rock; Heavy Metal
- Years active: 1985
- Label: Food for Thought
- Past members: Clive Burr; Paul Di'Anno; Janick Gers; Neil Murray; Pete Willis

Gogmagog were an English hard rock and heavy metal supergroup based in Chipping Barnet assembled in 1985 by record producer Jonathan King. The band's lineup featured drummer Clive Burr and vocalist Paul Di'Anno (formerly of Iron Maiden, guitarist Janick Gers (Gillan) bassist Neil Murray (Whitesnake), and guitarist Pete Willis (Def Leppard).

Together for only a short time, Gogmagog originally released a three-song E. P. on the small independent Food For Thought label in 1985 entitled I Will Be There. The title track was composed by longtime Kiss collaborator Russ Ballard and originally released on his 1981 solo album Into the Fire, with the other two songs being written by producer King ("It's Illegal, It's Immoral, It's Unhealthy, but It's Fun" and "Living in a Fucking Time Warp"). The band members did not provide any original material.

Originally, King attempted to put together a supergroup revolving around Whitesnake vocalist David Coverdale, bassist John Entwistle of The Who, and drummer Cozy Powell, all of whom were keen on the project. Powell said he thought the Ballard song was "the best he's ever written". Entwistle was excited - the concept was originally his idea - but this early line-up "wasn't working out" according to Di'Anno. Being little more than a contrivance concocted by producer King, the band quickly fell apart once he lost interest. Di'Anno was completely dismissive of both the group and producer, referring to the failed project as "...nothing. That was some fucking idiot who got us doing that shit." But Burr said "the others may not admit it but this is some of the best stuff any of us has done". He wrongly predicted it would sell more than Iron Maiden ever did.

Despite poor reception commercially, Gogmagog has become something of a cult classic among heavy metal fans and the tracks were re-released in 2022 as a single 13-minute "Metal Medley" and an example of OWOBHM - Old Wave Of British Heavy Metal.

The two King-penned songs appeared in the soundtrack to the 2011 film Me Me Me, also written by King. On some websites, the original members of the band are listed as appearing in the cast; however, the band Falling Red were recruited to perform as Gogmagog in the film.

== Personnel ==
=== Former members ===
- Clive Burr: drums, percussion
- Paul Di'Anno: lead vocals
- Janick Gers: guitars
- Neil Murray: bass
- Pete Willis: guitars

== Discography ==
I Will Be There EP (1985)

1. "I Will Be There" – 4:35 (Russ Ballard)
2. "Living in a Fucking Time Warp" – 3:14 (Jonathan King)
3. "It's Illegal, It's Immoral, It's Unhealthy, but It's Fun" – 3:30 (King)
