= Menace to Society (Killers album) =

1994 studio album by Killers

Studio album by Killers
- Released: 1994
- Genre: Groove metal; thrash metal
- Length: 51:47
- Label: Bleeding Hearts
- Producer: Paul Di'Anno, Steve Hopgood

Killers chronology
Murder One (1992)	Menace to Society (1994)	Live (1997)

Menace to Society is the second studio album by the heavy metal band Killers, featuring former Iron Maiden singer Paul Di'Anno. Unlike most of Di'Anno's works, this material is more aggressive and slower. The classic heavy metal is replaced by groove metal with elements of thrash. The song "Die by the Gun" has been compared to "Mouth for War" by Pantera.

== Track listing ==
1. "Advance and Be Recognised" – 1:06
2. "Die by the Gun" – 4:01
3. "Menace to Society" – 2:51
4. "?" – 5:04
5. "Think Brutal" – 4:03
6. "Past Due" – 4:52
7. "Faith Healer" – 6:14
8. "Chemical Imbalance" – 4:39
9. "A Song for You" – 4:23
10. "Three Words" – 5:47
11. "Conscience" – 5:38
12. "City of Fools" – 3:08

== Personnel ==
- Paul Di'Anno – vocals, producer
- Cliff Evans – guitars
- Gavin Cooper – bass
- Steve Hopgood – drums, producer, mixing
