= Menace to Sobriety =

Menace to Sobriety may refer to:

- Menace to Sobriety (Ugly Kid Joe album), 1995
- Menace to Sobriety (OPM album), 2000

== See also ==
- Menace to Society (disambiguation)
