= Clive Burr =

English drummer (1956–2013)

Background information
- Born: Clive Ronald Burr; 8 March 1956; East Ham, Essex, England
- Died: 12 March 2013 (aged 57) London, England
- Genres: Heavy metal, hard rock
- Occupation: Musician
- Years active: 1977–2013
- Formerly of: Iron Maiden, Samson, Stratus, Alcatrazz, Praying Mantis, Gogmagog, Trust, Elixir, Desperado

Clive Ronald Burr (8 March 1956 – 12 March 2013) was an English musician. He was the drummer of the heavy metal band Iron Maiden from 1979 to 1982. Together with fellow Iron Maiden member Dennis Stratton, he joined Praying Mantis for the recording of their 1996 live album Captured Alive in Tokyo City.

== Career ==
Previously a member of Samson, Burr joined Iron Maiden in 1979. Auditioning and joining upon the recommendation of then-Iron Maiden guitarist Dennis Stratton, Burr played on their first three records: Iron Maiden, Killers and their breakthrough release The Number of the Beast, the last of which was the Maiden debut of Bruce Dickinson. Burr was fired from the band in 1982 during The Beast on the Road tour. He was replaced by the band's now retired drummer, Nicko McBrain. Burr co-wrote one song on The Number of the Beast, "Gangland", and another song, "Total Eclipse", that was cut from the album and showed up as the B-side of the "Run to the Hills" single, and later on the Number of the Beast remastered CD re-release, and again on the 2022 40th Anniversary record, where it replaced Gangland. Burr also appeared on "The Number of the Beast", "Run to the Hills" and "Women in Uniform" (a cover of the Australian band Skyhooks).

In an interview with Classic Rock in February 2011, Burr candidly discussed his split from Maiden. Describing much of what has been written about the split as "hogwash", Burr indicated that he was ousted from the band after taking a break to mourn the recent death of his father, rebutting claims that his departure was due to overindulgence. Bruce Dickinson's 2017 autobiography suggests Burr was ousted due to personality conflicts with Steve Harris which led to the two arguing and acting out during performances.

After Iron Maiden, Burr briefly played in the French group Trust, thus switching places with McBrain, and briefly with the American band Alcatrazz. Burr was featured in the short-lived NWOBHM supergroup Gogmagog which also included ex-Iron Maiden vocalist Paul Di'Anno and future Maiden guitarist Janick Gers, ex Whitesnake bassist Neil Murray and ex Def Leppard guitarist Pete Willis. He also had a band known as Clive Burr's Escape (later known as Stratus), featuring former Praying Mantis members and future Uriah Heep vocalist Bernie Shaw, which disbanded after releasing one album. Burr then joined Dee Snider in his post-Twisted Sister outfit Desperado, which was never fully realized due to a falling out with the band's record company. Burr performed with British bands Elixir and Praying Mantis in the 1990s and appears on the Praying Mantis 1996 live album "Captured Alive in Tokyo City", but did not become a full member of either.

Burr's signature white drum kit was donated to the Hard Rock Cafe in London in 2005.

== Personal life ==
Burr's niece, Rayne Leat, is a professional wrestler signed to WWE under the ring name Lizzy Rain. Leat wrestles with a metalhead gimmick under the moniker "The Maiden of Metal", in reference to Burr and Iron Maiden. According to Leat, she was not close with Burr as he was battling multiple sclerosis by the time she got to know him. Leat also revealed that the jacket she wears to the ring belonged to Burr.

== Illness and death ==
Burr was diagnosed with multiple sclerosis (MS) in the late 1990s, the treatment of which left him deeply in debt. Iron Maiden staged a series of charity concerts and were involved in the founding of the Clive Burr MS Trust Fund. Burr used a wheelchair due to his condition. He was also the patron of Clive Aid, a charity formed in 2004. Clive Aid has continued to raise awareness and funds for various cancer and MS programs around the world through the staging of rock events. Burr attended many of these events. His partner, Mimi, was also diagnosed with MS.

Burr died in his sleep on 12 March 2013 in London due to complications related to MS. In a statement released on the band's website, Iron Maiden bass player Steve Harris stated "This is terribly sad news. Clive was a very old friend of all of us. He was a wonderful person and an amazing drummer who made a valuable contribution to Maiden in the early days when we were starting out. This is a sad day for everyone in the band and those around him and our thoughts and condolences are with his partner Mimi and family at this time." Iron Maiden singer Bruce Dickinson stated "Even during the darkest days of his M.S., Clive never lost his sense of humour or irreverence."

A funeral service was held for Burr on 25 March 2013 at the City of London Crematorium.

== Legacy ==
Burr's style was influential on many heavy metal drummers. Dave Lombardo, known for his work with bands such as Slayer, Grip Inc., Fantômas, Suicidal Tendencies and Testament stated that "his style was inspiring and the albums he recorded with Iron Maiden are touchstones of my music education". Charlie Benante of Anthrax said: "the drumming on 'Killers' inspired me to kick it up a notch and I did." According to Dave McClain, former drummer for Machine Head, who considers Burr a huge influence, he "brought punk rock drumming into heavy metal".

Other drummers like Lars Ulrich (Metallica), Paul Bostaph (Slayer, Exodus, Testament), Stefan Schwarzmann (Helloween, Krokus), Chris Reifert (Death, Autopsy), Steve Asheim (Deicide), Jan Axel Blomberg (Mayhem), Jason Bittner (Shadows Fall) and Richard Christy (Iced Earth, Death, Charred Walls of the Damned) also cited Burr as an influence.

Jeff Waters, guitarist and leader of Annihilator, regards his drumming as an inspiration on the drum parts he writes for his band.

Iron Maiden lead singer Bruce Dickinson considered him to be "...the best drummer the band ever had. That's not taking anything away from [present drummer] Nicko. Technically, Nicko's probably a far more competent drummer than Clive. It's just that Clive had this incredible feel, and you can't learn that, and I regret that he wasn't given more time to try and sort himself out." Iron Maiden guitarist Adrian Smith also praised his drumming ability. "Clive was a great drummer, an Ian Paice-type drummer, steady and solid with a nice feel to everything."

On April 13, 2026, it was announced Burr would be inducted into the Rock and Roll Hall of Fame as a member of Iron Maiden.

== Discography ==
With Samson

- "Telephone" (single)
- "Mr Rock and Roll" (single)

With Iron Maiden

Studio albums

- Iron Maiden (1980)
- Killers (1981)
- The Number of the Beast (1982)

Compilations and live albums

- Live!! +one (1980)
- Live at the Rainbow (1981)
- Maiden Japan (1981)
- Video Pieces (1983)
- 12 Wasted Years (1987)
- The First Ten Years (From There to Eternity) (1990)
- Best of the Beast (1996)
- Ed Hunter (1999)
- Classic Albums: Iron Maiden – The Number of the Beast (2001)
- BBC Archives (2002)
- Beast over Hammersmith (2002)
- Best of the 'B' Sides (2002)
- Edward the Great (2002)
- The History of Iron Maiden – Part 1: The Early Days (2004)
- The Essential Iron Maiden (2005)
- Somewhere Back in Time (2008)

With Trust

- Trust IV (1983)
- Man's Trap (1984)
- The Best of (1997)

With Stratus

- Throwing Shapes (1984)

With Gogmagog

- I Will Be There (EP; 1985)

With Elixir

- Lethal potion (1990)
- Sovereign Remedy (2004)

With Desperado

- Bloodied But Unbowed (1996, recorded in 1988)

With Praying Mantis

- Captured Alive in Tokyo City (1996)
- Demorabilia (1999) (compilation, contains demos of Clive Burr's Escape)
