= Wil Malone =

British music producer and arranger (born 1942)

Wil Malone (born Peter Wilson, 29 July 1942, Hornsey, North London) is a British music producer and arranger, who has worked with artists including The Who, Oasis, Richard Ashcroft, Rick Wakeman, Black Sabbath, Iron Maiden, Todd Rundgren, The Verve, Massive Attack, Depeche Mode and Italian rocker Gianna Nannini. In 1976, Malone and Lou Reizner covered a Beatles song, "You Never Give Me Your Money", for the musical documentary All This and World War II. Malone also did the string arrangements for several songs by collaborative techno group UNKLE.

Malone released an eponymous solo album in 1970 and another called Motherlight and composed the score for the cult horror film Death Line in 1972.

In February 2024, a three disc compilation album, Old Feet, New Socks: The Many Faces of Wil Malone 1965-1972, was released on Morgan Blue Town Records.
