= Paul Di'Anno =

English heavy metal singer (1958–2024)

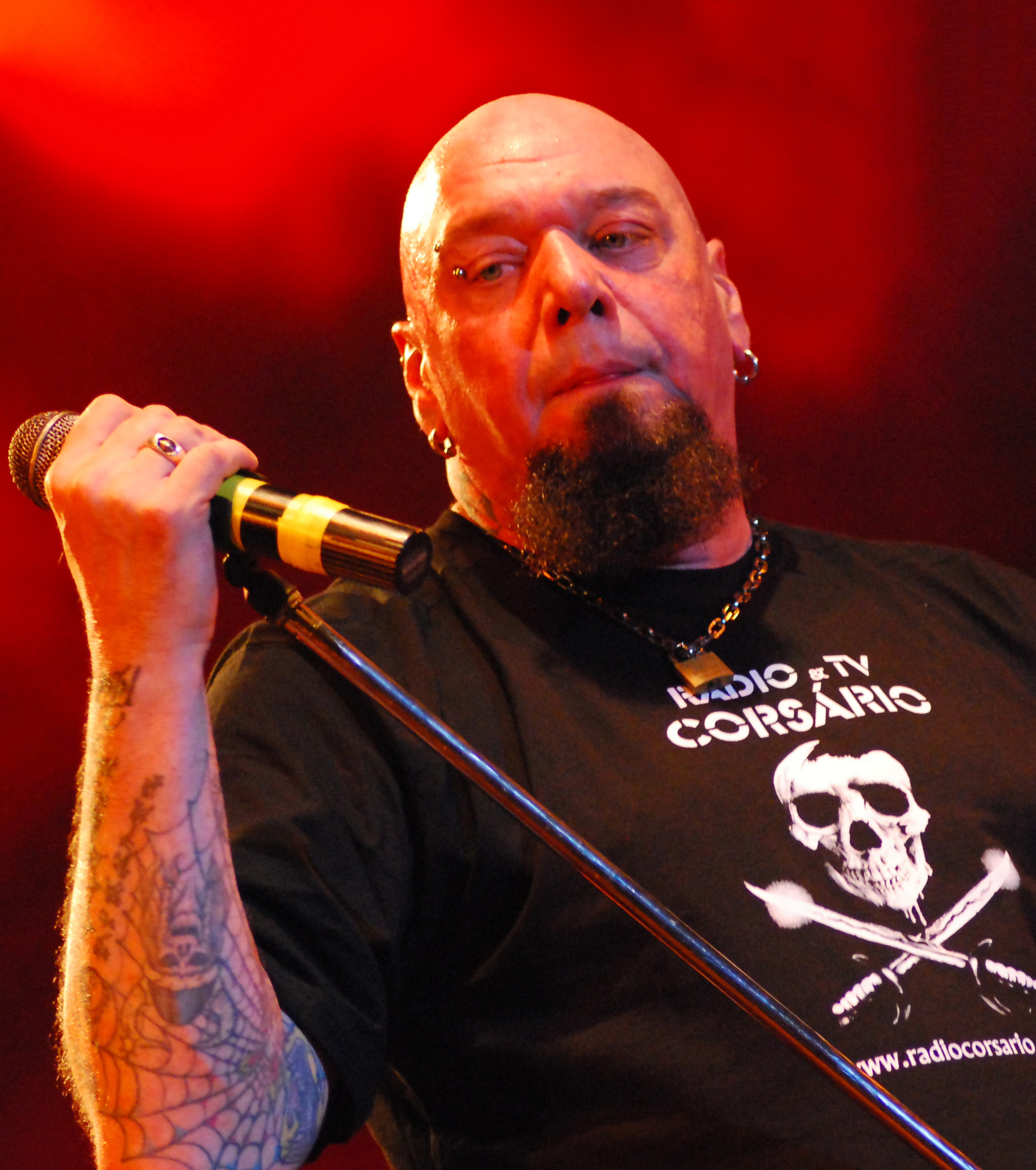
- Di'Anno in 2008

Background information
- Born: Paul Andrews; 17 May 1958; West Ham, London, England
- Died: 21 October 2024 (aged 66) Salisbury, Wiltshire, England
- Genre: Heavy metal
- Occupations: Singer; songwriter
- Years active: 1977–2024
- Formerly of: Iron Maiden; Battlezone; Gogmagog; Praying Mantis; Killers; Architects of Chaoz

Paul Andrews (17 May 1958 – 21 October 2024), better known by his stage name Paul Di'Anno, was an English heavy metal singer. He was the lead vocalist for Iron Maiden from 1978 to 1981, recording their first two studio albums.

Di'Anno remained active in music afterwards, as both a solo artist and as a member of bands such as Gogmagog, Di'Anno's Battlezone, Killers, Rockfellas, and Warhorse. Together with fellow Iron Maiden member Dennis Stratton, he joined Praying Mantis for the recording of their 1990 live album Live at Last.

== Career ==
=== Early years ===
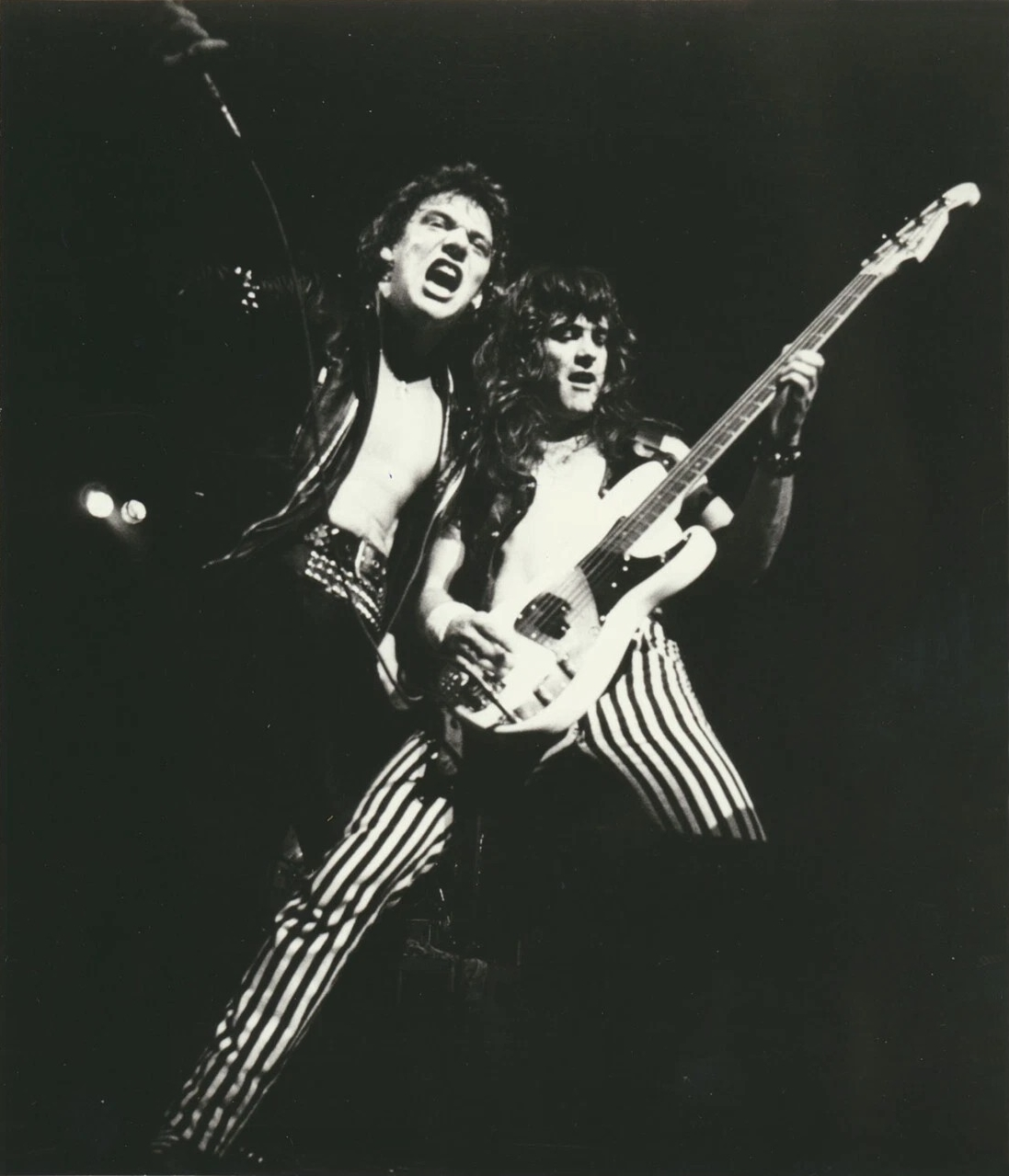
Di'Anno with Steve Harris in 1981

Di'Anno was born on 17 May 1958 in Chingford, Essex, where he also grew up. Because of his Brazilian father, Di'Anno held dual British and Brazilian citizenship. He spent his teenage years singing in various rock and heavy metal bands and working as a butcher in Station Road and as a chef in hotels and restaurants.

=== Iron Maiden (1978–1981) ===
According to Iron Maiden's The History of Iron Maiden – Part 1: The Early Days DVD, Di'Anno was introduced to the band by drummer Doug Sampson, an old friend of Steve Harris (Iron Maiden's founder and bass player) from his days in the band Smiler. It was around this time that he first adopted the stage name Di'Anno, which he would later use to claim Italian descent. Their first audition with Rod Smallwood reputedly failed when Di'Anno was arrested for showing off his pocket-knife in public.

The band's 1980 self-titled release quickly became acknowledged as a classic of its genre, as the band merged punk's energy with metal's riffs and progressive rock complexity, serving as the blueprint for such future genres as thrash metal and speed metal and influencing later progressive metal bands. 1981 saw the release of their second album, Killers, as well as a stopgap live EP, Maiden Japan.

By 1981, Di'Anno was demonstrating increasingly erratic behaviour, particularly due to his drug usage, about which Di'Anno comments, "It wasn't just that I was snorting a bit of coke, though; I was just going for it non-stop, 24 hours a day, every day ... the band had commitments piling up that went on for months, years, and I just couldn't see my way to the end of it. I knew I'd never last the whole tour. It was too much".

Iron Maiden decided that to progress they would have to find a singer able to complete those tour plans. They found a replacement in former Samson frontman Bruce Dickinson. Di'Anno's last show with the band was on 10 September 1981 at the Odd Fellow's Mansion in Copenhagen, Denmark. In 1981, he left Iron Maiden after a meeting with the band and their manager Rod Smallwood. Di'Anno jokingly stated: "It's like having Mussolini and Adolf Hitler run your band. Because it is Rod Smallwood and Steve Harris and that's it. There can't be anyone else and my character is too strong for that so me an' Steve was always fighting". Di'Anno was paid out by Smallwood at the time of his departure and did receive royalties for songwriting credits.

=== Di'Anno (1983–1985) ===
Di'Anno was the first project by Paul Di'Anno after he was fired from Iron Maiden. This group was originally called Lonewolf but after disagreement with a group already called Lone Wolf, they changed their name and ended up recording only one album under the simple moniker of Di'Anno. Musically the band shifted away from the NWOBHM sound of Iron Maiden to a more Americanized sound similar to bands like Journey and Foreigner. On the tour, Di'Anno played "Remember Tomorrow" from his catalogue of Iron Maiden songs, along with their own songs and a few other covers (most notably The Kinks' "You Really Got Me", and "Don't Let Me Be Misunderstood"). Having limited success, the six-piece band disbanded shortly after they were done touring. The only other recordings available from this band are a single of "Heartuser", a Japanese single of "Flaming Heart" and a Sweden-only VHS release called Live at the Palace (also available on DVD as Di'Anno Live from London). During the latter performance, the band played an unreleased song entitled "Spiritual Guidance", which Paul told the audience would be on the band's forthcoming album. This album was never recorded.

Last known line-up:

- Paul Di'Anno – lead vocals
- Lee Slater – guitars, vocals
- P. J. Ward – guitars, vocals
- Kevin Browne – bass, vocals
- Mark Venables – keyboards, vocals
- Frank Noon – drums (replacing Dave Irving from the album line-up who in turn replaced Mark Stewart)

=== Gogmagog (1985) ===
In 1985, Di'Anno joined a project that was intended to be a supergroup. The group, called "Gogmagog" (see the Biblical book Ezekiel 38:1–2), was put together by DJ and record producer Jonathan King, best known for discovering the group Genesis in the late 1960s. King assembled a star-studded line-up featuring Di'Anno, drummer Clive Burr, guitarists Janick Gers and Pete Willis and bassist Neil Murray, but the members became increasingly frustrated by a policy that forbade them from writing any original material. Gogmagog released a three-song E.P. on the independent Food For Thought label in 1985 entitled I Will Be There, with Russ Ballard writing the title song and producer King writing the other two songs. Although reviews were generally positive, the EP did not chart and the group disbanded after King began to lose interest in the project. Di'Anno has been completely dismissive of the short-lived project, referring to it as "nothing" and claiming he only got involved for the money.

=== Battlezone (1985–1989, 1998) ===
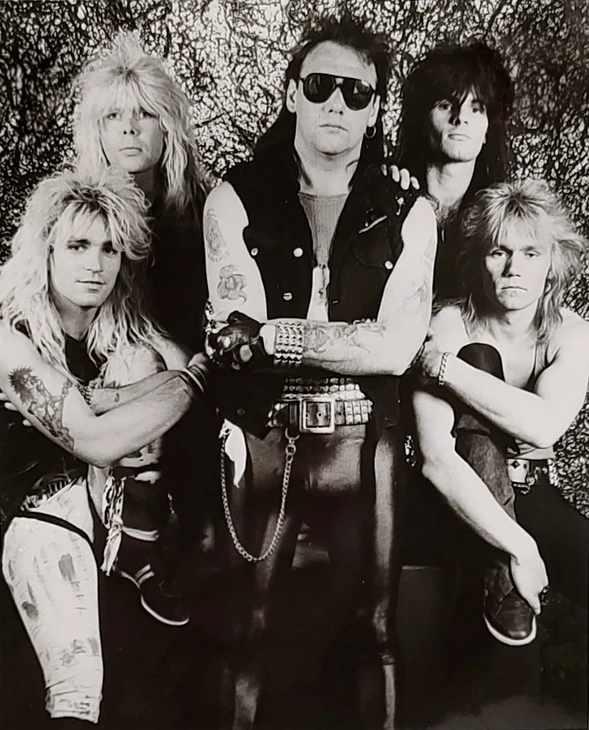
Battlezone in 1986. L-R: Bob Falck, John Wiggins, Di'Anno, John Hurley, Pete West

After the break-up of his self-titled band, Di'Anno formed Strike with DeeRal (guitar) who recruited drummer Bob Falck (who had used the name Sid Falck while playing drums in Overkill) and the Hurley brothers John (second guitar) and Chaz (bass). The project was eventually named Battlezone, after a name straight from a comic book, upon the vocalist's return to Britain in 1985. 1986 saw the enrolment of former Lonewolf and Tokyo Blade guitarist John Wiggins.

The band's initial line-up comprised Di'Anno, guitarists John Wiggins and John Hurley, bassist Laurence Kessler and Adam Parsons on drums. Di'Anno had previously known guitarists John Wiggins and John Hurley from bands such as Deep Machine and Iron Cross. Parsons had gone under the stage name A.D. Dynamite while in Aunt May. However, Parsons left shortly after to replace Vince Hoare in the London-based glam band Belladonna (formed by former Hell's Belles vocalist Paul Quigley, with Paul Lewis, Jeff Fox and Neil Criss) and Falck reappeared on the scene in time together with Danish bassist Pete West (Peter Vester) to record the band's first album Fighting Back, written entirely by John Hurley, except the title track which was credited to Bob Falck.

Battlezone performed a club tour of America in 1987 to promote the début Fighting Back, but musical differences, arguments and physical fights within the band led to the departure of John Hurley and Bob Falck after the first tour. According to Di'Anno's book The Beast, Hurley had become an "egomaniac" and the drummer Falck a "liability", so they were thrown out the band. Their places were taken by ex-Persian Risk members Graham Bath and Steve Hopgood respectively, following the tour's completion.

The second album to be released was entitled Children of Madness, and it featured a track entitled "Metal Tears", which is about a man who was unable to have a steady relationship and built a female robot, who he subsequently fell in love with. The original idea came from a book titled Clone. However, the track received criticism from the media for being very similar to a track (entitled "London") on Queensrÿche's Rage for Order album.

"Guitarist Graham Bath, who had been recruited to play second guitar, wasn't enthusiastic about touring, so he was fired from the band. Pete West, recommended a replacement Alf Batz, who joined just in time to go to New York for the video shoot." The video for "I Don't Wanna Know" was played in rotation on MTV in the US.

Drugs and infighting again put a strain on the band. Towards the end of the final tour, most members had quit leaving Di'Anno to complete the tour with a backing band in order to fulfil his contract.

Subsequently, American guitarist Randy Scott, along with Dave Harman on guitar and Eddie Davidson on bass, signed up with Battlezone. However, the band were without proper management and disbanded shortly after. Battlezone played their last concert on 10 December 1989, at Dynamo Open Air in Eindhoven, Netherlands .

Following the break-up of Battlezone, Di'Anno and Hopgood formed the power metal band Killers, releasing four albums. Hurley would later form glam rock band L.O. Girls and release the "Twelve Bore Honeymoon" single in 1990 and "Just Can't Say I Love You" in 1993. During 1990, Di'Anno fronted Praying Mantis for a tour of Japan, which was recorded for the subsequent Live at Last album release with ex-Iron Maiden guitarist Dennis Stratton. Wiggins joined a reformed Tokyo Blade in 1995.

By 1998, Di'Anno had resurrected the name Battlezone. Joining him were Wiggins and fellow ex-Tokyo Blade members bassist Colin Riggs and drummer Marc Angel. Second guitars were supplied by the Brazilian Paulo Turin. This line-up cut the album Feel My Pain, released by the fledgling "Zoom Club" label. Working titles for the album included "Spoon Face" and "Smack", both containing references to heroin use. The album had a heavier edge compared to the first two Battlezone albums. The band undertook a sold-out Brazilian tour in January 1998, with erstwhile Killers colleagues bassist Gavin Cooper and guitarist Nick Burr joining on this South American tour.

The band toured Brazil in the same year playing a three-week tour to sold-out audiences up to 6000 fans a night. Being brought back down to earth, Battlezone upon their return home put on a gig at the Walthamstow Royal Standard with an audience of only a hundred or so and a gig at JB's Dudley in the West Midlands attracting fewer than a dozen fans. A live track from the Walthamstow gig later appeared on a compilation of all three Battlezone albums, entitled Cessation of Hostilities. Ex-Battlezone bassist Gavin Cooper joined Lionsheart in December 2004, then moved onto Statetrooper in May 2005. The bassist subsequently joined the ranks of Magnum singer Bob Catley's solo band for UK dates in April 2006.

In mid-2008, a Battlezone compilation entitled The Fight Goes On was released as on the Phantom Sound & Vision label as a 3-CD box set featuring all three Battlezone studio albums.

Last known line-up:

- Paul Di'Anno – Vocals
- Johnny "Bravo" Wiggins – Guitars (1985–1989, 1998–1999)
- Paulo Turin – Guitars (1998–1999)
- Colin Riggs – Bass (1998–1999)
- Marc Angel – Drums (1998–1999)

Former/past member(s):

- DeeRal – Guitars (1985)
- John Hurley – Guitars (1985–1987)
- Graham Bath – Guitars (1987)
- Alf Batz – Guitars (1987–1989)
- Randy Scott – Guitars (1989)
- Dave Harman – Guitars (1989)
- Nick Burr – Guitars (1998)
- Chaz Hurley – Bass (1985–1986)
- Peter Vester – Bass (1986–1988) listed as "Pete West" on the back covers of Fighting Back and Children of Madness)
- Eddie Davidson – Bass (1989)
- Gavin Cooper – Bass (1998)
- Bob "Sid" Falck – Drums (1986–1987)
- J. Michael D. – Drums
- Steve Hopgood – Drums (1987–1989)

=== Praying Mantis (1990) ===
After being dropped by BMG, Praying Mantis disbanded. Then, in a Spinal Tap–ish twist of fate, Paul Di'Anno called Dennis Stratton in 1989, about the Japanese wanting to have a ten-year anniversary of the new wave of British heavy metal. The band found themselves enjoying a renaissance in Tokyo, prompting a reformation and tour in April 1990, which yielded the Live at Last LP.

=== Killers (1990–1997, 2001–2003) ===
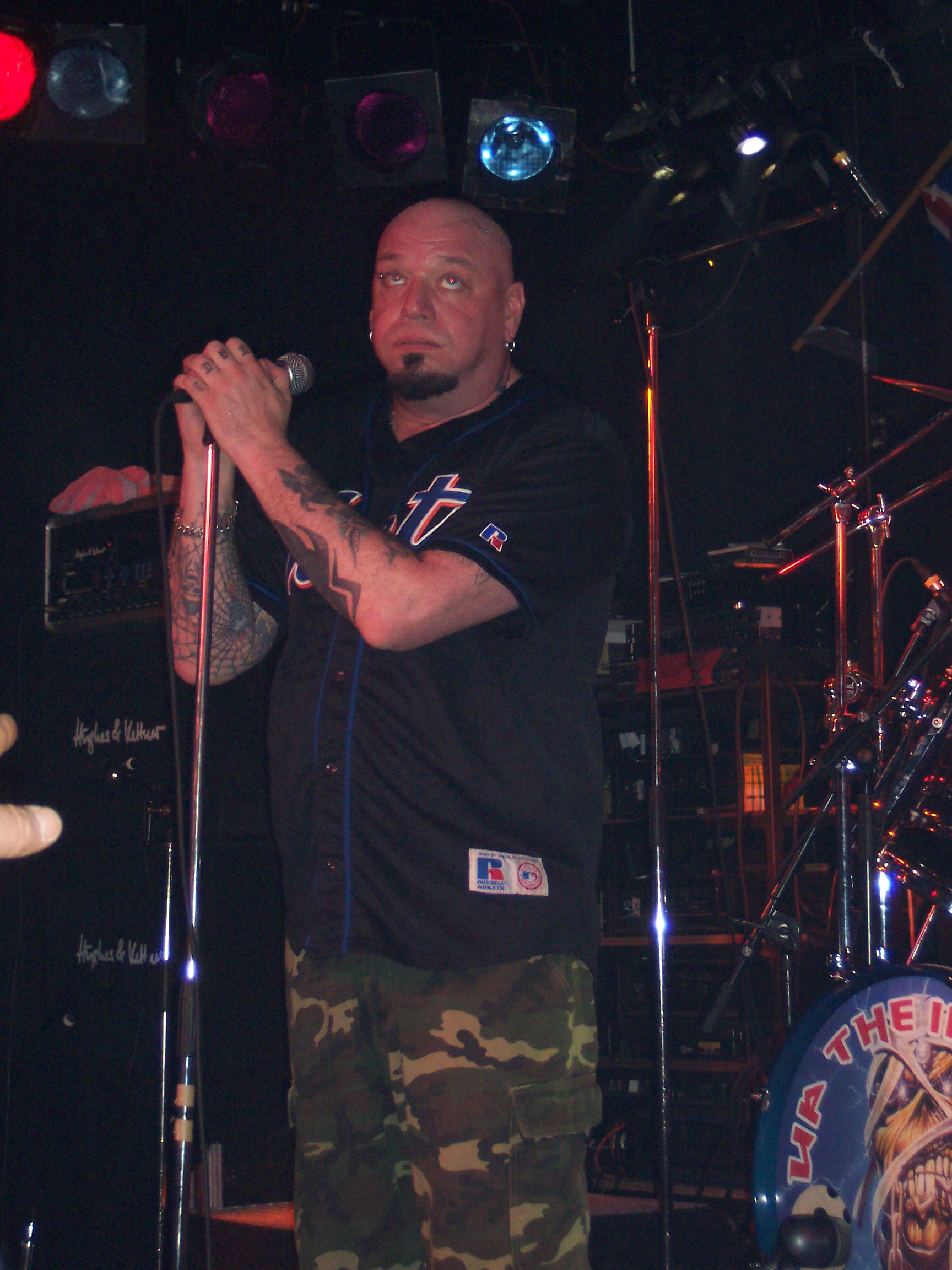
Di'Anno in 2003

Killers formed in the summer of 1991. Cliff Evans was living in New York with Arnie Goodman, the manager of Fastway. Steve Hopgood, who had played in Battlezone with Di'Anno, called Evans and outlined plans for a new group. Di'Anno and Hopgood flew to New York and formed a band.

Within a few days, Killers had hired John Gallagher (from Raven) to play bass on a short-term basis. Former member of Drive She Said and New York session player Ray Detone was brought in on second guitar.

Shortly afterward, a live album called Assault on South America was recorded, featuring a number of Iron Maiden and Battlezone tracks and covers of "We Will Rock You" and "Smoke on the Water". This was funded by Rock in Rio promoter Carlos Genesio, primarily for the South American market. "Recorded in Brazil, Argentina and Venezuela in Summer of 1993" is splashed on the back cover. However, according to John Gallagher, the South American tour fell through so the entire album was recorded on a mobile recording truck in New York. Later, a Canada-based record company called Magnetic Air Productions issued a pirate (bootleg) release worldwide, under a different cover, with no royalties being paid to the band.

Killers then played two days of showcases at Arnie Goodman's New York City studio for several major record companies including Virgin, EMI, Sony and BMG. Representatives attended from all over the world. The band played only Iron Maiden songs because they had not written any material. These included "Phantom of the Opera" and "Wrathchild". BMG gave the band a $250,000 contract.

Once Killers had the record deal, they started to write their first album, Murder One. Rob Fraboni was recruited to produce the record. The band moved to Binghamton, where they stayed in a motel with a rehearsal studio. The album was written in about in two weeks. Fraboni then took Killers to White Crow Audio (Burlington, Vermont) to record the drums which took about half a day. Finally, vocals and final mixing were performed at The Powerstation in New York.

Nick Burr left Killers after the completion of Murder One and was replaced by former Battlezone and Persian Risk guitarist Graham Bath. For the next 18 months the band played to fans all over Europe, Japan and coast to coast across the USA.

After the tour of Murder One, Killers returned to the UK while Di'Anno stayed in the US. Around this time, Di'Anno married an English woman, whom he flew into New York. Drugs and alcohol took their toll and the marriage quickly fell apart. Di'Anno left New York and moved in with his new American girlfriend in L.A. A fight between him and her involving a knife and he was arrested for spousal abuse, cocaine possession and firearms offences. Di'Anno was described by a judge as a 'menace to society' and sentenced to four months jail. It was there that Di'Anno began writing songs for the next Killers album, posting tapes to the UK, where the band were now living.

Upon release, Di'Anno was deported to the UK. The band had already signed to Bleeding Hearts records located in Newcastle, where they recorded their second studio album, entitled Menace to Society. This had a more groove/thrash metal sound, which some critics compared to the works of Pantera and Machine Head. It was poorly received by many critics with the exception of Metal Hammer magazine in Germany who voted it as the "Best New Album" for that year.

By 2003, Di'Anno and Cliff Evans toured as the only original members of Killers. Di'Anno hired new musicians whom he remembered from touring in Germany and Austria. Marcus Thurston joined as second guitarist, Darayus Kaye took over bass duties and Pete Newdeck on drums. Steve Hopgood had to retire as he developed tinnitus. Guitarist Graham Bath developed arthritis in his hands. Di'Anno had wanted Clive Burr (ex-Iron Maiden) on drums, but he could not get to rehearsals in time. Burr later developed multiple sclerosis, and died in 2013.

By 2004, Killers had disbanded. Cliff Evans subsequently formed his own record company, Soundhouse Records, and re-released the entire Killers back catalogue with the addition of another live album entitled Killers Live at the Marquee in 2008. Murder One album was reissued with 2 acoustic bonus tracks – "Wrathchild" and "Dreamkeeper". Following this, Paul Di'Anno made both Killers studio albums available for download free of charge through his own website. Following legal action, Soundhouse was forced to cease selling any Killers material.

In December 2013, Paul Di'Anno and Cliff Evans announced that the band would regroup and release a new album entitled The Lazarus Syndrome. Producer Phil Kinmanm who had worked on Tank's album War Nation was announced to be involved with the new project.

Last known line-up

- Paul Di'Anno – Vocals
- Cliff Evans – Guitars
- Graham Bath – Guitars (Persian Risk, Sphinx)
- Brad Wiseman – Bass
- Steve Hopgood – Drums (ex-Battlezone, ex-Chinatown, ex-Jagged Edge, Persian Risk, Shy, Tank, Wild)

Former/past member(s)

- John Gallagher – Bass (1991–1992)
- Ray Ditone – Guitars (1991–1992)
- Nick Burr – Guitars (1992) (ex-Battlezone, ex-Idol Rich, ex-Tyrant, now Bad Back Band)
- Gavin Cooper – Bass (1992–1994) (ex-Battlezone)

=== Nomad/Di'Anno (1999–2001, 2003–2008) ===
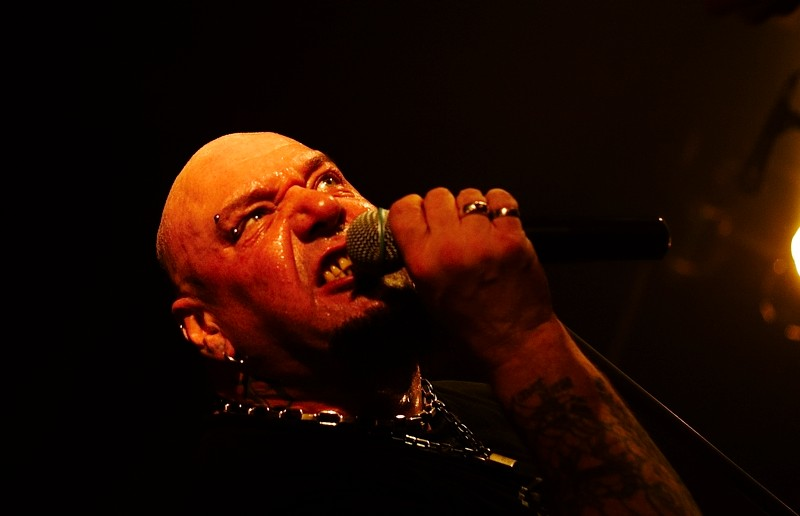
Di'Anno performing in 2006

Following the demise of the new Battlezone unit put together in 1998, Di'Anno teamed up with expat Brazilian guitarist Paulo Turin and lived in São Paulo during 2000. A new band was created initially under the banner of "Nomad" and featured an all Brazilian line up. It was economically and logistically preferable for Di'Anno to live in Brazil during this period, in order to tour South America and release a self-produced album pleasing to that particular market. The album was distributed by Perris Records. However, complete worldwide distribution was not achieved.

The album was repackaged and released as The Living Dead. The package included a DVD video for the title track. This was recorded in the East London Docks and directed by Swedish director Mats Lundberg from Doom Films, who went to London to work on the concept with Di'Anno's manager Lea Hart. All of the special effects were added in Sweden and the story line was based on the lyrics and message of the song. Few previously released live Iron Maiden tracks were also added to the CD.

=== Running free in Norway Tour (2002) ===
In February 2002, Di'Anno had a mini-tour in Norway and visited Kroa in Volda, Samfundet in Trondheim, Betong in Oslo, Parkbiografen in Skien, Folken in Stavanger and Kvarteret in Bergen. The band was all Norwegian.

=== Rockfellas (2008–2010) ===
Late 2008, Di'Anno relocated to the southeast of Brazil and toured with a new band/project named Rockfellas with three Brazilian musicians: Jean Dolabella (drummer; ex-Diesel/Udora/Sepultura), Marcão (guitarist; of Charlie Brown Jr.) and Canisso (of Raimundos/ex-Rodox), playing rock & roll and metal classics. There, he was nicknamed "Paulo Baiano" ("Paulo" = Paul in Portuguese, Baiano = Who was born in Bahia), being the "Paulo Baiano" nickname a pun/joke, for his name, Paul Di'Anno, is pronounced in a similar way to the nickname above.

=== The Swedish band (2005–2014) ===
In between 2005 and 2014, Di'Anno toured with his Swedish band in 13 countries in Europe, Asia and South America (Sweden, Venezuela, Finland, Norway, Denmark, Poland, Spain, Hungary, Bulgaria, India, Russia, Ukraine, Greece). In 2005 they performed at Gillmanfest, in Venezuela. 2006 Di'Anno recorded a cover of Led Zeppelin's song Kashmir (List of cover versions of Led Zeppelin songs) produced by Staffan Österlind.

The four Swedish musicians were: Mikael Fässberg (guitar) (Bonafide), Staffan Österlind (guitar) (Tuff, Black Robot), Martin Wezowski (bass), (Majestic), Carl Michael Hildesjö (drums). Fässberg was later replaced by Rasmus Ehrnborn (Soilwork, The Night Flight Orchestra), Wezowski was replaced by Andreas Grufstedt and Hildesjö by Johan Helgesson.

=== Norwegian live band (2008–2024) ===
Early 2008, Di'Anno toured Norway and later Eastern Europe in 2009 with an all-Norwegian backing band consisting of musicians Henrik "Rick" Hagan (drums), Are Gogstad (bass), Jon Vegard Naess (guitar) and Anders Buaas (guitar). Anders Buaas was later replaced by guitarist Rikard Nilsen. The band went on to do several tours of Sweden, and made festival appearances at Hard Rock Hell (Wales, UK 2013), Voxbotn (Faroe Islands, Denmark 2013), Tons of Rock (Halden, Norway 2014), Sweden Rock Festival (Norje, Sweden 2014) and Rock Against Narcotics (Pune, India 2015), before doing a tour of Sweden in the summer of 2015. The band also toured with Blaze Bayley and Tim Ripper Owens.

=== 2010s ===
Di'Anno was, before being jailed in March 2011, recording a new solo album with Paulo Turin, the guitarist who worked on Feel My Pain and Nomad. The album was being produced by Dieter Roth in his studio in Germany. However, work on the album ceased due to record company problems.

He maintained an extensive world tour schedule, including two trips through America where traditional metal band Icarus Witch served as both his opening and backing band. In June 2012, Di'Anno was given the Freedom of the City of Bariloche in Argentina for charitable work carried out several years earlier.

In 2014, Di'Anno sang on lead vocals on the bonus track "Fuck You All" on the album Big Trouble by hard rock band Hollywood Monsters. The album was released in 2014 on Mausoleum Records and featured Steph Honde on vocals and guitars, Vinny Appice on drums, Tim Bogert on bass and Don Airey on keyboards.

Despite planning to retire in 2013, in August 2014 Di'Anno released a new album with a new band, Architects of Chaoz, called The League of Shadows.

In 2015, he returned to Brazil on his tour "The Beast is Back", saying that this would be his last there. He was accompanied by musicians from Rio de Janeiro, Vinnie Tex (guitar), Thiago Velasquez (bass) and drummer Braulio Drumond; they later joined Leather Leone's band. Di'Anno made eight presentations around the country. These members would be part of the new band, however due to health problems, the singer had to pause activities.

The same year, Di'Anno was interviewed extensively for the book Iron Maiden: 80 81, by author Greg Prato.

In May 2016, Di'Anno was hospitalised for undisclosed reasons and was forced to cancel an announced June 2016 tour of Brazil.

On 29 October 2017, Di'Anno, in a wheelchair, joined The Iron Maidens on stage for their encore at the O2 Academy in Islington, London, performing "Wrathchild" and "Iron Maiden".

=== 2020s ===
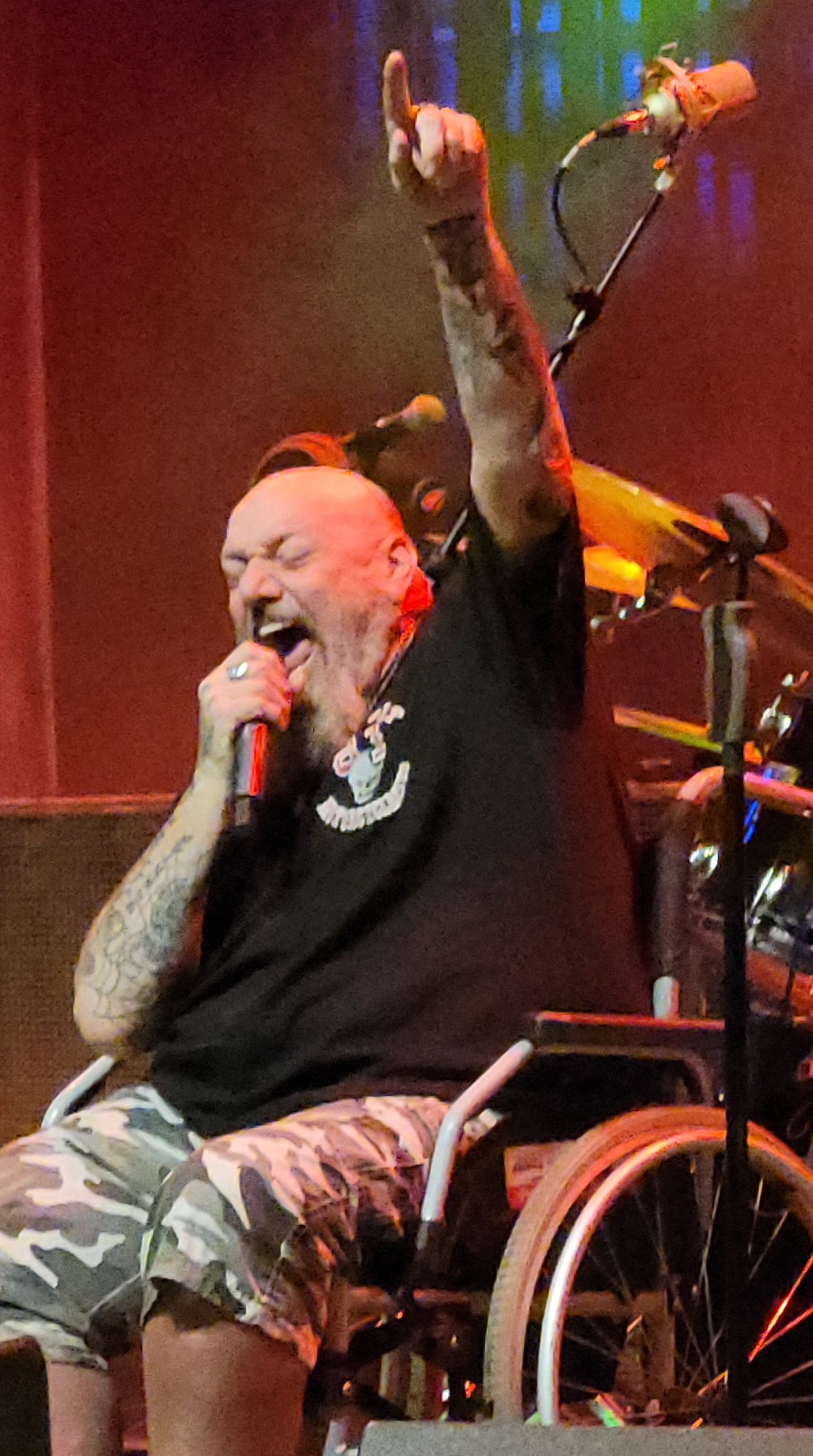
Di'Anno in 2023, in a wheelchair, performing his first UK show in 10 years at KK's Steelmill in Wolverhampton, England

Di'Anno was due to make his final performance on 30 August 2020 at the Beermageddon Festival in Bromsgrove, England, before he retired from touring, though he did not clarify on whether he intended to continue to record music. This appearance was cancelled due to the COVID-19 pandemic, with the festival dates rescheduled for August 2021. However, on 7 June 2021, Paul and the Ides of March band were removed from the line up with the following statement: "We here at Beermageddon are gutted to announce Ides of March will no longer be appearing at this years festival, we had been struggling to contact the band or management and just over a week ago had the news that the planned project will not be going ahead and as such the band will not appear at Beermageddon 2021. We were so looking forward to Paul Di'Anno and a lineup of past Iron Maiden members gracing the Geddon stage, it would have been one of the most memorable festival appearances we have ever had, but sadly it isn't to be. I know many of you had huge anticipation for Di'Anno's farewell show, and we feel your pain, but we do promise Beermageddon will still be the fantastic festival it always is."

On 21 May 2022, Di'Anno performed his first live show in 7 years with the Norwegian live band at Bikers Beer Factory in Zagreb, Croatia.

In August 2023, it was announced that Di'Anno would release a new album for BraveWords Records in 2024 under the name Paul Di'Anno's Warhorse.

On 27 September 2024, Di'Anno released his first career retrospective, The Book of the Beast on Conquest Music. This best of was available as limited edition 2-LP sets in coloured vinyl, along with a CD+DVD set consisting of new masters of his best post-Iron Maiden recordings and some previously unreleased material. Also included were Di'Anno singing duets with Tony Martin (Black Sabbath) and ZP Theart (Dragonforce).

A documentary film on Di'Anno titled "Di'Anno: Iron Maiden's Lost Singer" and directed/produced by Wes Orshoski debuted at European film festivals in the fall of 2025. The film, shot from 2017 to 2023, largely focuses on the efforts of two fans (Kastro Pergjoni and Stjepan Juras) who in the middle of the Covid 19 pandemic attempt to help the singer relocate to Croatia, where he attempts to get back on his feet literally, emotionally and professionally. In the film, Di'Anno rides an emotional rollercoaster, running out of money, reuniting with his former Maiden bandmates and falling in love -- all while his health makes a dramatic turn-around thanks to the goodwill of fans, doctors and nurses. Di'Anno makes a heroic, risky and drama-filled return to the stage. Called "brutal and brilliant" by Metal Hammer magazine and "phenomenal" by radio host Eddie Trunk, the film features appearances by James Hetfield (Metallica), Gene Simmons (Kiss), Andreas Kisser (Sepultura), David Ellefson (Megadeth), Bobby "Blitz" Ellsworth (Overkill), Gary Holt (Slayer/Exodus) and former Iron Maiden members Blaze Bayley, Dennis Stratton, Doug Sampson, Bob Sawyer, Barry Graham Purkis (aka Thunderstick) and Terry Wapram. The movie is a tribute to the musician's legacy and contribution to redefining metal with the first two Iron Maiden studio albums featuring Paul Di'Anno as vocalist.

== Singing style ==
In comparison to the operatic vocals of Bruce Dickinson, his successor in Iron Maiden, Di'Anno is remembered for having a more guttural punk rock-influenced sound to his singing, in part because he began his singing career in punk band the Paedophiles. He usually sang with a raspy and rougher sound, although he was capable of singing with a purer voice as demonstrated by slower numbers like "Remember Tomorrow", "Strange World" and "Prodigal Son".

Later in his career, Di'Anno's style, along with his music, became darker and more aggressive, diverging further from Iron Maiden's sound which was becoming more progressive.

== Personal life ==
Di'Anno married five times and had six children.

Di'Anno's religious affiliation was made uncertain by his own words; he gave interviews that contradicted each other on this subject, perhaps as a practical joke. He had a tattoo on the back of his head that said "666" and "GOD = SUCKER". According to his autobiography, he converted to Islam in the 1990s after reading the Quran. However, he later reversed that position, saying "I think religion kills everybody. I don't believe in it. ... No, my father was a Muslim, I must admit. But I don't give a fuck." In later interviews, Di'Anno clarified that he never was a true Muslim, that he never stopped drinking, but tried to become a better person by applying some of the Muslim philosophies to his life. His autobiography furthers the confusion: in various passages he claimed to be Muslim, Catholic, Jewish, and Aboriginal.

In February 2011, Di'Anno was convicted on eight counts of benefit fraud for claiming more than £45,000 under false pretences. On 11 March 2011, he was jailed for nine months at Salisbury Crown Court. He only served two of the nine months to which he was sentenced, being released early for good behaviour.

Di'Anno stated in 2023 he was on friendly terms with his former Iron Maiden bandmate Steve Harris, and also regularly received royalty payments from his time with the band.

=== Autobiography ===
Di'Anno released an autobiography titled The Beast (ISBN 1-904034-03-9). The book includes a chapter of stories and comments regarding Di'Anno written by former bandmates including Dennis Stratton, John Wiggins and Steve Hopgood. The book was controversial for its portrayal of his abuse of various drugs, many accounts of Di'Anno's violence towards people, and the explanation of his ban from America.

=== Other interests ===
Di'Anno had several businesses outside the music industry, including an internet café and a hotel/restaurant in England, both of which he sold. He was latterly resident in Salisbury, Wiltshire. He was a supporter of the English football club West Ham United.

== Illness and death ==
A crowdfunder was launched in January 2021 to help raise money for Di'Anno's knee surgery, following several years of poor health. In September 2021, it was reported that Di'Anno was still waiting for the surgery, and a photo surfaced of the singer showing his badly swollen leg. In October 2021, the crowdfunding had reached its target to which Di'Anno heartily thanked everyone for their support. In November 2021, Di'Anno relocated to Croatia to undergo treatment and surgery for his knee. Following the successful surgery, Di'Anno confirmed reports that Iron Maiden helped pay for the final part of his treatment in Croatia.

Di'Anno died at his Salisbury home, on 21 October 2024, at the age of 66. Record label Conquest Music confirmed his death the same day, and stated that Di'Anno died after "being troubled by severe health issues in recent years that restricted him to performing in a wheelchair". His sisters Cheryl and Michelle confirmed he died of an aortic dissection, stating: 'Basically he had a tear in the sac around the heart and blood has filled inside it from the main aorta artery and that has caused the heart to stop.' He was buried at the Manor Park Cemetery and Crematorium.

== Legacy and tributes ==
During Iron Maiden's October 22, 2024 concert at the Xcel Energy Center in Saint Paul, Minnesota they paid tribute to Di'Anno. During the performance lead singer Bruce Dickinson gave a speech about Di'Anno and his impact on the band. Stating "Paul was instrumental in the first two (MAIDEN) albums, groundbreaking with Killers and the first album. An amazing voice, devoted to rock and roll right up till the last minute of his life."

A tribute show was held in Di'Anno's honor on November 7, 2024, at Underworld Camden, featuring performances by Electric Gypsy, Gypsy's Kiss, and Hi-On Maiden (all of whom were slated to support Di'Anno on a planned tour that was cancelled due to his death).

In 2021 Di'Anno was inducted into the Metal Hall of Fame. On April 13, 2026, it was announced Di'Anno would be inducted into the Rock and Roll Hall of Fame as a member of Iron Maiden.

== Discography ==
=== Solo ===
- The World's First Iron Man (1997)
- As Hard as Iron (1997)
- Beyond the Maiden (Compilation, 1999)
- The Masters (Compilation, 1999)
- The Beast (Live, 2001)
- The Beast in the East (Live, 2003 DVD)
- The Living Dead (2006)
- The Maiden Years – The Classics (Compilation, 2006)
- Iron Maiden Days & Evil Nights (Compilation, 2007)
- Wrathchild – The Anthology (Compilation, 2012)
- The Beast Arises (DVD, 2014)
- Hell Over Waltrop – Live In Germany, Recorded in 2006) (Live, 2020)
- The Book of the Beast (CD+DVD compilation with unreleased tracks, 2024)

=== Iron Maiden ===
- The Soundhouse Tapes (1979)
- Iron Maiden (1980)
- Live!! +one (1980)
- Killers (1981)
- Live at the Rainbow (1981)
- Maiden Japan (1981)
- 12 Wasted Years (1987)
- The First Ten Years (From There to Eternity) (1990)
- Best of the Beast (1996)
- Ed Hunter (1999)
- BBC Archives (2002)
- Best of the 'B' Sides (2002)
- The History of Iron Maiden – Part 1: The Early Days (2004)
- The Essential Iron Maiden (2005)

=== Di'Anno ===
- Live at the Palace (VHS, 1984)
- Di'Anno (1984)
  - "Flaming Heart" (1984)
  - "Heartuser" (1984)
- Nomad (2000)
- Live at the Palace, recorded in 1984 (DVD, 2005)
- The Book of the Beast (2024)

=== Battlezone ===
- Fighting Back (1986)
- Children of Madness (1987)
- Warchild (Compilation 1988)
- Feel My Pain (1998)
- Cessation of Hostilities (Compilation with all three studio albums Battlezone released + Children of madness demo tracks and one new live track, 2001)
- The Fight Goes On (Boxset including all three Battlezone studio albums, 2008)
- Paul Di'Anno's Battlezone: Killers In The Battlezone (1986–2000) (3-CD Box Set, 2022)

=== Killers a.k.a. Paul Di'Anno & Killers ===
- Murder One (1992)
- South American Assault Live (1994)(Recorded on summer, 1993)
- Menace to Society (1994)
- Live (1997)
- New Live & Rare (1998)
- Killers Live at the Whiskey (2001) (Recorded Whisky a Go Go, Los Angeles, 2000)
- Screaming Blue Murder – The Very Best of Paul Di'Anno's Killers (2002)

=== Gogmagog ===
- I Will Be There EP (1985)

=== All Stars ===
- N.W.O.B.H.M. (1991)

=== Dennis Stratton ===
- The Original Iron Men (1995)

   1-I've Had Enough / (lead vocal:Dennis Stratton)
   2-Lucky To Lose / (lead vocal:Paul Di'Anno)
   3-Let Him Rock / (lead vocal:Paul Di'Anno)
   4-It Ain't Over 'Til It's Over / (lead vocal:Dennis Stratton)
   5-Listen What Your Heart Says / (lead vocal:Paul Di'Anno)
   6-She Won't Rock / (lead vocal:Paul Di'Anno)
   7-Bad Girls / (lead vocal:Dennis Stratton)
   8-I'll Be Miles Away / (lead vocal:Paul Di'Anno)
   9-Death Of Me / (lead vocal:Paul Di'Anno)
  10-Two Hearts In Love / (lead vocal:Dennis Stratton)

- The Original Iron Men 2 (1996)

  1-Let Your Body Rock / (lead vocal:Dennis Stratton)
  2-The Fool You Left Behind / (lead vocal:Paul Di'Anno)
  3-The Answer Is You / (lead vocal:Paul Di'Anno)
  4-No Repair / (lead vocal:Paul Di'Anno)
  5-This Man's Face On Fire / (lead vocal:Paul Di'Anno)
  6-Don't Take These Dreams Away / (lead vocal:Paul Di'Anno)
  7-So Far Away / (lead vocals:Paul Di'Anno and Dennis Stratton)
  8-Dead Or Alive / (lead vocals:Paul Di'Anno and Dennis Stratton)
  9-Big Beat No Heart / (lead vocal:Paul Di'Anno)
 10-It's Only Love / (lead vocals:Paul Di'Anno and Dennis Stratton)
 11-Danger / (lead vocal:Paul Di'Anno)

- Hard As Iron (compilation) (1996)
- Made in Iron (1996)

=== Praying Mantis & Paul Di'Anno, Dennis Stratton ===
- Live at Last (1991) (Recorded at Nakano Sunplaza, Tokyo, 18 April 1990)

=== The Almighty Inbredz ===
- The Almighty Inbredz (1999)

=== Architects of Chaoz ===
- League of shadows (2015)

=== On compilations ===
- Metal for Muthas (with Iron Maiden, 1980)
- Kaizoku (1989, Song: "Danger on the Street II")
- All Stars Featuring The Best Of British Heavy Metal & Heavy Rock Musicians (1991, Song "She is danger")
- True Brits (1993)
- True Brits 2 (1994)
- True Brits 3 (1995)
- Rock Hard Hard Rock (1994, Songs: "No Repair", "She goes down")
- X-Mas: The Metal Way (1994)
- Killer Voices (1995)
- Metal Monsters (1996)
- Metal Christmas a.k.a. The 21st Century Rock Christmas Album (1996, Song: "Another Rock and Roll Christmas")
- Hard 'n' Heavy Rock (2001, Song: "Lights Out")
- Wacken Rocks (2001, Song: "Wrathchild (live)")
- Classic Rock, Classic Rockers (2002)
- Metal Masters – Killers (2005, Song: "Killers")
- Rock Hard – Das Festival (2007, Song: "Prowler (live)")
- The Many Faces of Iron Maiden – Journey Through The Inner World of Iron Maiden (2016)

=== On tribute albums ===
- In The Name Of Satan – A Tribute To Venom (1998) (with Killers: "Black Metal")
- 666 The Number One Beast (Iron Maiden Tribute) (1999)
- 666 The Number One Beast Volume 2 (Iron Maiden Tribute) (1999)
- The Maiden Years (Iron Maiden Tribute) (2000)
- Gimme all your Top (ZZ Top Tribute) (2000) (Song: "Sleeping Bag")
- The Boys are back (Thin Lizzy Tribute) (2000) (Song: "Killer On the Loose")
- Only UFO can rock me (UFO Tribute) (2001) (Song: Shoot Shoot)
- Another Hair of the Dog (Nazareth Tribute) (2001) (Songs: "Hair Of The Dog" and "Broken Down Angel")
- Hangar de Almas: Tributo A Megadeth (2005) (Song: "Symphony Of Destruction")
- Numbers from the Beast – An All Stars Tribute to Iron Maiden (2005) (Song: "Wrathchild")
- World's Greatest Metal – Tribute to Led Zeppelin (2006) (Song: "Kashmir")
- An '80s Metal Tribute to Van Halen (2006) (Song: "Ain't Talkin' 'Bout Love")
- A Tribute to The Rolling Stones (2007) (Songs: "I Wanna Be Your Man" and "Jumpin' Jack Flash")
- Top Musicians Play The Rolling Stones (2010) (Song: "Paint It Black")
- Thriller – A Metal Tribute To Michael Jackson (2013) (Song: "Bad")
- Tribute to Rod Stewart and The Faces II (2015) (Songs: "Hot Legs" and "Cindy Incidentally")

=== Guest appearances ===
- English Steel: Start 'em young (1993, Song: "She goes down")
- English Steel: Lucky Streak Vol. II (1994, Songs: "Danger", "Dirty")
- Aciarium: The Heavy Metal Superstars (1996)
- Re-Vision: Longevity (2001) (Song: "Larvae")
- Spearfish: Back, for the Future (2003) (Song: "Justice In Ontario")
- Destruction: Inventor of Evil (2005) (Song: "The Alliance of Hellhoundz")
- Michael Schenker Group: Heavy Hitters (2005) (Song: "Hair Of The Dog")
- Ira: Gloria Eterna (2008) (Song: "Marshall Lockjaw")
- Mantra: Building: Hell (2010) (Song: "Master Of My Life")
- Sotajumala/Deathchain: Split CD (2010) (Sotajumala, Song: "Prowler")
- Attick Demons: Atlantis (2011, Song: "Atlantis")
- Legions Of Crows: Stab Me (2011) (Song: "Coventry Carol")
- Så Jävla Metal: The History of Swedish Hard Rock and Heavy Metal (2011 Film) (Song: "Så Jävla Metal")
- Wolfpakk: Wolfpakk (2011) (Song: "The Crow")
- Prassein Aloga: Midas Touch (2011, "See the Bodies" und "Flesh of Life")
- Layla Milou: Reborn (2012) (Song: "You Own Control")
- Scelerata: The Sniper (2012) (Guest vocals, co-writing, composing)
- Rushmore: Kingdom Of Demons (2013)
- Red Dragon Cartel: Wasted (2014)
- Hollywood Monsters: Big Trouble (2014, bonus track: "Fuck you all")
- Odium: The Science Of Dying (2014) (Song: "Die With Pride")
- Turbo: In the Court of the Lizard (2014) (Song: "Breaking the Law")
- Maiden United: Remembrance (2015) (Song: "Prowler")
- Mikael Fassberg: Lazy Sunday (2015)
- Coffee Overdrive: Rocket L(A)unch (2015) (Song: "To The Top")
- United Artists Against Terrorism: Heroes (2016)
- Ibridoma: December (2016) (Song: "I'm a Bully")
- Zix: Tides of the Final War (2016) (Song: "Metal Strike")
- Mikael Fassberg: All or Nothing (2017)
- AirForce (UK): Black Box Recordings Volume 2 (2018) (Song: "Sniper")
- AirForce (UK): Strike Hard (2022) (Song: "Don't Look in Her Eyes")
- Warhorse: Stop the War / The Doubt Within (2022, Single) (Song: "Stop the War")
- Warhorse: Warhorse (2023, Single) (Song: "Warhorse")

== See also ==
- Blaze Bayley
- List of new wave of British heavy metal bands

== Sources ==
- The History of Iron Maiden – Part 1: The Early Days (DVD). UK: EMI. 23 November 2004.
- Wall, Mick (2004). Iron Maiden: Run to the Hills, the Authorised Biography (third ed.). Sanctuary Publishing. ISBN 1-86074-542-3.

https://www.metaltalk.net/paul-dianno-iron-maidens-lost-singer-is-a-dark-powerful-tribute-to-a-fallen-icon.php
