= Picture Music International =

PMI (Picture Music International) was a division of EMI that specialised in music video releases for EMI artists. Releases included videos from The Beatles, John Lennon, Paul McCartney, Kate Bush, Cliff Richard, The Shadows, Pet Shop Boys, Queen, Pink Floyd and Duran Duran, as well as Iron Maiden, Meat Loaf and Queensrÿche. It has been succeeded by Abbey Road Interactive.
