= Rod Smallwood =

English music manager

Rod Smallwood OBE
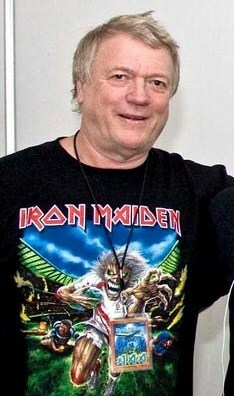
- Smallwood in Costa Rica, 2008
- Born: Roderick Charles Smallwood; 17 February 1950 (age 76); Huddersfield, England, UK
- Education: Trinity College, Cambridge
- Occupation: Music manager
- Years active: 1969–present
- Employer(s): Iron Maiden, Steve Harley & Cockney Rebel
- Website: www.ironmaiden.com

Roderick Charles Smallwood OBE (born 17 February 1950) is an English music manager, best known as the co-manager of the English heavy metal band Iron Maiden. With his business partner, Andy Taylor, whom he met while studying at Trinity College, Cambridge, he founded the Sanctuary Records Group in 1979, which became the largest independent record label in the UK and the largest independent music management company in the world until its closure in 2007. Prior to managing Iron Maiden, Smallwood managed Steve Harley & Cockney Rebel.

== Biography ==
Smallwood was born and raised in Huddersfield, West Yorkshire, where he grew up listening to The Beatles and The Rolling Stones on the radio and playing cricket and rugby union. It was only when he began attending university that his musical interests expanded and he began listening to Deep Purple, Pink Floyd, Grateful Dead and The Doors.

In the autumn of 1968, Smallwood began studying architecture at Trinity College, Cambridge, where he soon became involved in organising social events, such as the annual Trinity May Ball, for which he booked the "various acts". It was while undertaking these duties that he formed a friendship with fellow undergraduate and future business partner Andy Taylor. From then on, Smallwood and Taylor worked on end-of-term events together and booked various musicians, including Graham Bond, Chris Farlowe, Bridget St John, John Martyn, and, most notably, the MC5. Smallwood acquired most of these artists from a local booking agency, Horus Arts, whose boss, Barry Hawkins, gave Smallwood advice which led to his career as a booking agent.

Shortly before his final exams in 1971, Smallwood dropped out of university and moved to Paris with his girlfriend, stating that "it just seemed like the cool thing to do". After three months in Paris, Smallwood undertook a job at a London booking agency, Gemini, in order to finance a trip to Morocco. Through his work with Gemini, Smallwood was offered a "£35 a week" job with rival agency MAM, and therefore abandoned his trip to Morocco. After 18 months with MAM, Smallwood began managing English rock act Steve Harley & Cockney Rebel. Smallwood disliked working with Harley, whom he would later describe as "a pain - selfish, egotistical, obsessed" and thus "completely put me off management." Convinced by EMI, Harley fired Trigram, his management agency, and Smallwood undertook the management of punk rock act Gloria Mundi.

In 1979, Smallwood decided to return to university to obtain a law degree, where he was given a copy of Iron Maiden's demo tape. After much deliberation, Smallwood eventually contacted Steve Harris, the band's bassist and founder member, and arranged two pub gigs for the group in west London, one at the Windsor Castle in Maida Vale and the other at The Swan in Hammersmith. Neither show went to plan: the first was cancelled after the band refused to play early, and the band had to perform the second without lead vocalist, Paul Di'Anno, who was arrested for carrying a knife 30 minutes before the gig. In spite of this, Smallwood agreed to help the group, although, following his experiences with Steve Harley, he did not initially commit to becoming their full-time manager until he arranged the band's signing to EMI and publishers Zomba at the end of the year. Eventually joined by Andy Taylor in 1982, the pair have managed the group ever since.

After committing himself to managing Iron Maiden in October 1979, Smallwood decided to form his own management company, which he would name after Iron Maiden's second single, "Sanctuary". Sanctuary Records Group eventually expanded into the largest independent record label in the United Kingdom until its closure in 2007. Before this, in November 2006, Smallwood left Sanctuary and formed Phantom Music Management with Andy Taylor, which focuses solely on Iron Maiden.

The Iron Maiden b-side "Sheriff of Huddersfield" was written by Iron Maiden about Rod Smallwood, and was released on the 1986 single "Wasted Years". It likens Smallwood to the Sheriff of Nottingham due to his notorious stinginess with money and refers to his frequent complaints about a (then-recent) move to Los Angeles. Smallwood did not know about the song until the single was released. In June 2026, the manager received the Order of the British Empire (OBE) as part of the King's Birthday Day Honors. In November 2026, Pollstar named Rod Smallwood an Impact International UK/Euro Honoree. The recognition celebrates innovative and influential leaders driving creativity, growth, and impact across the live entertainment industry in the UK and Europe.
