= Maiden England =

1989 live album and video by Iron Maiden

Video and live album by Iron Maiden
- Released: 8 November 1989 (video); 1994 (audio)
- Recorded: 27–28 November 1988
- Venues: National Exhibition Centre, Birmingham
- Genre: Heavy metal
- Length: 95:00 (video, approx.); 74:27 (audio)
- Labels: PMI; EMI
- Director: Steve Harris
- Producer: Martin Birch

Iron Maiden video chronology
12 Wasted Years (1987)	Maiden England (1989)	The First Ten Years: The Videos (1990)
En Vivo! (2012)	Maiden England '88 (2013)	The Book of Souls: Live Chapter (2017)

Iron Maiden chronology
Live at Donington (1993)	Maiden England (1994)	The X Factor (1995)
En Vivo! (2012)	Maiden England '88 (2013)	The Book of Souls (2015)

Alternative cover
- 2013 DVD reissue cover

Singles from Maiden England
- 1. "Infinite Dreams" Released: 6 November 1989

Maiden England (re-released in 2013 as Maiden England '88) is a live video by the band Iron Maiden during their Seventh Son of a Seventh Son world tour, which was dubbed Seventh Tour of a Seventh Tour.

It was recorded at the National Exhibition Centre in Birmingham on 27 and 28 November 1988, released on VHS in November 1989, followed by a limited VHS/CD edition in 1994. The CD in this package does not include two songs that are in the video ("Can I Play with Madness" and "Hallowed Be Thy Name"), due to space limitations. In 2013, the full concert footage, including encores which were not featured in the original VHS, was reissued on DVD, CD and LP under the new title, Maiden England '88.

The video was directed and edited by Steve Harris, Iron Maiden's founder and bassist.

== Background ==
After sitting in on the editing process of their music videos, and having been less involved in their previous concert video, Live After Death, the band's bassist, Steve Harris, decided that he would direct and edit their next film. According to Harris, the band decided to document the Birmingham concerts because he "wanted to film with 10 cameras so we needed to do it in a place where that amount of equipment wouldn't get in the way of the paying punters." This narrowed the band's options down to the NEC and Wembley Arena, but eventually chose the former as they were more "amenable about the idea". According to manager Rod Smallwood, Harris' briefing to the camera crew was to try and film "as the fans saw it", with Harris arguing that this would be a good way to capture the concert's atmosphere.

So that he could edit the video at his own pace, Harris bought all of the necessary equipment himself and installed it at his home in Essex, where he worked on the film for six months. Although they occasionally visited Harris to check on his progress, the rest of the band were largely uninvolved in the project, although, at his insistence, a piece of footage showing guitarist Dave Murray mouthing the lyrics to the opening song was removed.

A DVD re-issue of the concert film was first mentioned by Iron Maiden in September 2007, with a release date set for 2008, but was later delayed. In an interview with German magazine Rock Hard in August 2012, Harris confirmed that Maiden England would be re-released in 2013, with the concert footage expanded to comprise the show's encores which were not included in the original VHS. On 12 February 2013, Iron Maiden announced that Maiden England would be re-released on DVD, CD and picture disc on 25 March 2013 under the title Maiden England '88. Along with the aforementioned encores, the new video also includes the third part of the "History of Iron Maiden" documentary series (continuing from 2004's The History of Iron Maiden – Part 1: The Early Days and 2008's Live After Death re-issue) as well as promo videos and the 1987 documentary 12 Wasted Years.

From 2012 to 2014, Iron Maiden undertook the Maiden England World Tour, which is largely based around the original video in setlist and stage design.

== Critical reception ==
Professional ratings
Review scores
Source	Rating
AllMusic	4/5 stars
Classic Rock	8/10
PopMatters	7/10

AllMusic gave the original VHS 4 out of 5, deeming it "a strong effort", but also stating that it is "risky... because it doesn't rely on hits" and that it "doesn't have the seminal power of [their] own extraordinary Live After Death from four years earlier". They also gave four marks to the 2013 reissue, arguing that the additional songs "help to turn the live set into a more well-rounded listening experience", concluding that it is "a solid concert that shows one of the most influential bands in heavy metal getting down to business and bringing some epic metal to an enthralled crowd".

Classic Rock gave the 2013 DVD a score of 8 out of 10, remarking that the concert footage is "a succinct encapsulation of how great Maiden are when all the gears mesh together", concluding that "when it comes to creating a fan-pleasing effort, no one does it with quite the same degree of thought as Maiden."

== Track listing ==
=== 1989 VHS track listing ===
1. "Moonchild" (Adrian Smith, Bruce Dickinson)
2. "The Evil That Men Do" (Smith, Dickinson, Steve Harris)
3. "The Prisoner" (Harris, Smith)
4. "Still Life" (Dave Murray, Harris)
5. "Die with Your Boots On" (Smith, Dickinson, Harris)
6. "Infinite Dreams" (Harris)
7. "Killers" (Harris, Paul Di'Anno)
8. "Can I Play with Madness" (Smith, Dickinson, Harris)
9. "Heaven Can Wait" (Harris)
10. "Wasted Years" (Smith)
11. "The Clairvoyant" (Harris)
12. "Seventh Son of a Seventh Son" (Harris)
13. "The Number of the Beast" (Harris)
14. "Hallowed Be Thy Name" (Harris)
15. "Iron Maiden" (Harris)

=== 1994 CD track listing ===
Maiden England track listing
No.	Title	Writer(s)	Length
1.	"Moonchild"	Adrian Smith; Bruce Dickinson	5:45
2.	"The Evil That Men Do"	Smith; Dickinson; Steve Harris	4:16
3.	"The Prisoner"	Harris; Smith	5:57
4.	"Still Life"	Dave Murray; Harris	4:32
5.	"Die with Your Boots On"	Smith; Dickinson; Harris	5:10
6.	"Infinite Dreams"	Harris	5:53
7.	"Killers"	Harris; Paul Di'Anno	4:54
8.	"Heaven Can Wait"	Harris	7:32
9.	"Wasted Years"	Smith	4:54
10.	"The Clairvoyant"	Harris	5:42
11.	"Seventh Son of a Seventh Son"	Harris	10:11
12.	"The Number of the Beast"	Harris	4:46
13.	"Iron Maiden"	Harris	5:01
Total length:			74:33

=== 2013 DVD track listing ===
==== DVD 1 ====
1. "Moonchild" (Adrian Smith, Bruce Dickinson)
2. "The Evil That Men Do" (Smith, Dickinson, Steve Harris)
3. "The Prisoner" (Harris, Smith)
4. "Still Life" (Dave Murray, Harris)
5. "Die with Your Boots On" (Smith, Dickinson, Harris)
6. "Infinite Dreams" (Harris)
7. "Killers" (Harris, Paul Di'Anno)
8. "Can I Play with Madness" (Smith, Dickinson, Harris)
9. "Heaven Can Wait" (Harris)
10. "Wasted Years" (Smith)
11. "The Clairvoyant" (Harris)
12. "Seventh Son of a Seventh Son" (Harris)
13. "The Number of the Beast" (Harris)
14. "Hallowed Be Thy Name" (Harris)
15. "Iron Maiden" (Harris)
16. "Run to the Hills" (Harris)
17. "Running Free" (Harris, Di'Anno)
18. "Sanctuary" (Harris, Murray, Di'Anno)

==== DVD 2 ====
1. "The History of Iron Maiden" – Part 3 (40 minutes approximately)
  - Continuation of "The History of Iron Maiden" documentary series, following 2004's The Early Days and 2008's Live After Death. Band members, crew, friends and associates talk about the period in the band's career which saw the writing, recording and release of the Somewhere in Time (1986) and Seventh Son of a Seventh Son (1988) albums, their respective tours (1986-87's Somewhere on Tour and 1988's Seventh Tour of a Seventh Tour), and the recording of the Maiden England live video.
2. 12 Wasted Years (90 minutes approximately)
  - 1987 film documenting the band's first 12 years with interviews and live footage.
3. Promotional clips for "Wasted Years", "Stranger in a Strange Land", "Can I Play with Madness", "The Evil That Men Do" and "The Clairvoyant".

=== 2013 CD track listing ===
Disc one
No.	Title	Writer(s)	Length
1.	"Moonchild"	Adrian Smith; Bruce Dickinson	6:23
2.	"The Evil That Men Do"	Smith; Dickinson; Steve Harris	4:18
3.	"The Prisoner"	Harris; Smith	6:00
4.	"Still Life"	Dave Murray; Harris	4:32
5.	"Die with Your Boots On"	Smith; Dickinson; Harris	5:19
6.	"Infinite Dreams"	Harris	5:53
7.	"Killers"	Harris; Paul Di'Anno	4:57
8.	"Can I Play with Madness"	Smith; Dickinson; Harris	3:25
9.	"Heaven Can Wait"	Harris	7:43
10.	"Wasted Years"	Smith	5:06
Total length:			53:36

Disc two
No.	Title	Writer(s)	Length
1.	"The Clairvoyant"	Harris	4:30
2.	"Seventh Son of a Seventh Son"	Harris	10:08
3.	"The Number of the Beast"	Harris	4:47
4.	"Hallowed Be Thy Name"	Harris	7:21
5.	"Iron Maiden"	Harris	5:11
6.	"Run to the Hills"	Harris	4:01
7.	"Running Free"	Harris; Di'Anno	5:33
8.	"Sanctuary"	Harris; Murray; Di'Anno	5:24
Total length:			46:55

== Personnel ==
Production and performance credits are adapted from the VHS cover, reissue DVD and CD, and AllMusic.

Iron Maiden

- Bruce Dickinson – lead vocals
- Dave Murray – guitar
- Adrian Smith – guitar, backing vocals
- Steve Harris – bass guitar, backing vocals, director, editing
- Nicko McBrain – drums

Additional musicians

- Michael Kenney – keyboards

Production

- Martin Birch – producer, engineer, mixing
- Derek Riggs – cover illustration
- Ross Halfin – photography
- Andy Matthews – remastering, editing (2013 reissue), director and producer ("The History of Iron Maiden" documentary)
- Kevin Shirley – mixing (2013 reissue)
- Ted Jensen – mastering (2013 reissue)
- Leon Zervos – mastering (2013 reissue)
- Hervé Monjeaud – cover illustration (2013 reissue)

== Charts ==
=== VHS ===
Country	Chart (1990)	Peak position
United States	Billboard charts	6

=== DVD ===
Country	Chart (2013)	Peak position
Australia	ARIA Charts	3
Austria	Ö3 Austria Top 10 DVD	2
Belgium (Flanders)	Ultratop	2
Belgium (Wallonia)	Ultratop	2
Finland	The Official Finnish Charts	2
France	SNEP	2
Germany	Media Control Charts	2
Hungary	MAHASZ	9
Italy	FIMI	1
Japan	Oricon	69
Netherlands	MegaCharts	2
Portugal	AFP	8
Spain	PROMUSICAE	1
Sweden	Sverigetopplistan	1
Switzerland	Swiss Hitparade	2
United Kingdom	UK Music Video Charts	2
United States	Billboard charts	1

=== Album ===
Country	Chart (2013)	Peak position
Austria	Ö3 Austria Top 40	23
Belgium (Flanders)	Ultratop	71
Belgium (Wallonia)	Ultratop	36
Czech Republic	IFPI	9
Finland	The Official Finnish Charts	21
France	SNEP	26
Germany	Media Control Charts	14
Hungary	Mahasz	12
Italy	FIMI	26
Japan	Oricon	108
Netherlands	MegaCharts	49
Norway	VG-lista	29
Scotland	Official Charts Company	24
Spain	PROMUSICAE	15
Sweden	Sverigetopplistan	12
Switzerland	Swiss Hitparade	26
United Kingdom	Official Albums Chart	30
United States	Billboard 200	148

== Certifications ==
Region	Certification	Certified units/sales
Canada (Music Canada)	Gold	5,000^{^}
United States (RIAA)	Gold	50,000^{^}
^{^} Shipments figures based on certification alone.
