= Somewhere in Time (Iron Maiden album) =

Studio album by Iron Maiden
- Released: 29 September 1986
- Recorded: January–June 1986
- Studios: Compass Point (Nassau, The Bahamas); Wisseloord (Hilversum, Netherlands)
- Genres: Heavy metal; progressive metal
- Length: 51:37
- Label: EMI
- Producer: Martin Birch

Iron Maiden chronology
Live After Death (1985)	Somewhere in Time (1986)	Seventh Son of a Seventh Son (1988)

Singles from Somewhere in Time
- 1. "Wasted Years" Released: 25 August 1986; 2. "Stranger in a Strange Land" Released: 10 November 1986

Somewhere in Time is the sixth studio album by the English heavy metal band Iron Maiden. It was released on 29 September 1986 in the United Kingdom by EMI Records and in the United States by Capitol Records. It was the band's first album to feature guitar synthesisers.

Since its release, Somewhere in Time has been certified platinum by the RIAA, having sold over one million copies in the US. Somewhere on Tour was the album's supporting tour. In 2023, it was made the focus of the Future Past World Tour, alongside 2021's Senjutsu.

== Background ==
Somewhere in Time is the band's first studio effort following the extensive World Slavery Tour of 1984–85, which was physically draining for the group, lasting 331 days and comprising 187 concerts. The resulting exhaustion is credited as the main factor in the complete lack of songwriting contributions from lead vocalist Bruce Dickinson, whose material was rejected by the rest of the band. Dickinson had written several "acoustic-based" songs, explaining that "I felt we had to come up with our Physical Graffiti or Led Zeppelin IV ... we had to get it onto another level or we'd stagnate and drift away", although bassist and primary writer Steve Harris "thought he'd lost the plot completely", surmising that "he was probably more burnt out than anyone at the end of that last tour". On the other hand, the record is also notable for the number of "fully formed" songs written by guitarist Adrian Smith, who wrote both of the album's singles: "Wasted Years" and "Stranger in a Strange Land", the former of which is the only song on the record not to feature synthesisers. Smith wrote the songs due Dickinson temporarily stepping aside after having his ideas in changing musical direction being shut down, which allowed other members of the band to pick up the compositional slack.

Following the World Slavery Tour, the group were given four months to recuperate, with Harris, Smith and guitarist Dave Murray spending the time experimenting with new equipment. The result was a marked change in sound for Iron Maiden, as it was their first to use guitar and bass synthesisers, although on their next release, 1988's Seventh Son of a Seventh Son, the effects were provided by keyboards instead. Given their time off, this was their first studio album not to be released a year after their previous one, the band insisting that they have more time "to get it right without hurrying for a change", comments Harris. It was also one of their most expensive records, with the bass and drums recorded at Compass Point Studios in Nassau, The Bahamas, the guitars and vocals recorded at Wisseloord Studios in Hilversum, Netherlands; and the mixing taking place at Electric Lady Studios in New York City.

While the majority of the release's songs have disappeared from the band's live shows shortly after its supporting tour, "Wasted Years" and "Heaven Can Wait" have appeared on several subsequent tours. On 28 May 2023, nearly 37 years after the album's release, Iron Maiden performed "Alexander the Great" live for the first time.

The 2008 tribute CD Maiden Heaven: A Tribute to Iron Maiden, released by Kerrang! magazine, features covers of two of the album's songs; "Wasted Years" by DevilDriver and "Caught Somewhere in Time" by Madina Lake.

== Songs ==
Although "space and time" are common themes throughout the release, with songs such as "Wasted Years", "Caught Somewhere in Time", "Stranger in a Strange Land" and "Deja-Vu", the band never intended for it to be a concept album, with Harris stating, "We certainly never went in there and said, 'Right let's write a load of songs on the subject of time.'"

The album opener and demi-title track "Caught Somewhere in Time", written by Harris, is narrated from the point of view of the Devil (or a demon) offering a man the opportunity to travel in time, in exchange for his soul. Adrian Smith's "Wasted Years", the album's leading single, deals with the themes of homesickness and alienation and was partially inspired by Smith's own experiences during the seemingly-unending World Slavery Tour, and is followed by "Sea of Madness", an up-tempo song by the same author; speaking of those, Harris highlighted their "optimistic message". "Heaven Can Wait" was one of the first songs completed during the writing process, and Harris stated that it is about a person having an out-of-body experience and fighting it with their determination to live.

"The Loneliness of the Long Distance Runner" was based on the 1962 British film of the same name and tells the story of a boy reflecting on long-distance running as a way to evade both physically and emotionally from his situation; in 2017, the song was quoted by Paula Radcliffe (2005 World Champion in the discipline) in a clip about the mental and physical faculties a long-distance runner needs, in the context of the BBC coverage of the 2017 World Championships in Athletics. The album's second single, "Stranger in a Strange Land", was inspired to Smith by the true story of a sailor who disappeared during an expedition to the North Pole and found years later perfectly preserved in ice, and draws its title from a 1959 Robert Heinlein book. "Dejà Vu" (the only co-written song in the track list) is about the psychological sensation of déjà vu, whereby someone feels a strong sense of recollection despite the context makes it uncertain or impossible. The album's closing track, "Alexander the Great (356–323 BC)", is a chronological narration of the life and conquests of Alexander the Great, the King of Macedon from 336 to 323 BC and conqueror of a great portion of Eastern Mediterranean and Asia Minor.

== Cover artwork ==
The cover for Somewhere in Time, created by the band's then-regular artist Derek Riggs, displays a muscular cyborg-enhanced Eddie in a futuristic, Blade Runner-inspired environment. Much like the cover of Powerslave, the wraparound album cover holds a plethora of references to earlier Iron Maiden albums and songs, such as:

- The street sign on the corner where Eddie is standing reads Acacia (partially obscured), a reference to the song "22 Acacia Avenue" from The Number of the Beast (1982).
- Below "Acacia" is a poster of Eddie from the first album, with graffiti reading "Eddie lives" written on it. Torn posters are also featured on the "Sanctuary" and "Women in Uniform" singles.
- A banner with the words "This is a very boring painting" is displayed backward within the lobby of the Bradbury Towers Hotels International. This can be seen to the left of Eddie's right leg.
- In the very centre, just above the "Department" sign and behind the cable going to the cyborg's weapon, there is a small vertical phrase in red neon, which reads "Меня Рвёт" [Menya Rvyot], Russian for "I'm vomiting" — or more literally, "it's tearing me up", depending on the context.
- An Eye of Horus neon sign is at the top of a building, a reference to the song "Powerslave" from the 1984 album of the same name.
- To the right of Eddie's left leg there is a rubbish bin attached to a lamppost, identical to the one seen on the cover of the Iron Maiden album.
- The haloed black cat from the back cover of the 1985 Live After Death album is on the pavement behind Eddie.
- Below the Eye of Horus is the name, "Websters", a tribute to Charlie Webster, EMI's art director.
- Derek Riggs' artistic signature symbol can be found on Eddie's chest.

References on the back include:

- A clock reading 23:58 ("2 Minutes to Midnight").
- Below the clock there is a sign which reads "Phantom Opera House", in reference to the song "Phantom of the Opera" from the first album.
- The words "Bollocks again & again" appear just below the "Phantom Opera House".
- A building on the left side carries the sign, "Aces High Bar", a reference to the song of the same name.
- Flying over the "Aces High Bar" is a Spitfire from the "Aces High" cover.
- To the left of the "Aces High Bar" are four letters in yellow and green. These are Hebrew letters spelling out the name of God, namely יהוה, Jehovah/Yahweh.
- Below the "Aces High Bar", is a sign that reads "Sand Dune" in reference to their song "To Tame a Land," from Piece of Mind (1983), based on the Dune novel.
- Many pyramids appear in the background, a reference to the Powerslave album.
- Among the pyramids is a Grim Reaper, similar to that which appears on the covers of "The Trooper" and Live After Death.
- The marquee for the cinema reads Blade Runner, the film which inspired the album's cover. It also reads "Live After Death", the name of their 1985 live album.
- The cinema is named "Philip K. Dick Cinema", named after the author of Do Androids Dream of Electric Sheep?, the book on which the film Blade Runner was based.
- More Blade Runner references include "Dekkers Department Stores" and a "Tyrell Corp" sign.
- In the background, "Bradbury Towers" can be seen, a reference to the Bradbury Building which is prominent in Blade Runner.
- To the right of the clock is a neon sign which reads "Ancient Mariner Seafood Restaurant", a reference to the song "Rime of the Ancient Mariner" from the Powerslave album.
- On the bottom left hand side of the cover is "The Ruskin Arms", famous for being one of the first venues in which Iron Maiden performed.
- On the second floor of the "Ruskin Arms" building is a woman sitting in a red lit room which, a reference to Charlotte the Harlot, a repeated character in the band's songs.
- Just above "The Ruskin Arms" is a neon sign that reads "Rainbow", another famous venue where Iron Maiden recorded a live video in 1980.
- Above and to the left of the "Rainbow" sign is a neon sign reading "L'Amours Beer Gardens", a reference to the "L'Amours" rock venue which Iron Maiden once played in Brooklyn, New York City.
- On the roof of the same building is the TARDIS from the BBC TV series Doctor Who. The TARDIS is also featured on the cover of the "Wasted Years" single.
- Above the Bradbury Towers neon sign is Icarus in flames falling from the sky, in the same style of the cover for the band's 1983 single "Flight of Icarus". According to Riggs, Icarus is supposed to look like the logo used by Swan Song Records, a label founded by Led Zeppelin.
- On the walkway above the clock is an electronic sign that says "LATEST RESULTS.......WEST HAM 7........ARSENAL 3", a nod to Steve Harris who is a West Ham United supporter.
- At the right edge below, just near the band, there is another sign in Russian – Кефир ("Kefir").
- Just above the "KEFIR" sign is a street sign reading "Upton Park," which was the name of West Ham's former stadium.
- There is a sign which reads "Tonight: Gypsy's Kiss", a reference to Harris' first band.
- On the right side, above the "Bradbury Towers" sign, is a sign in Japanese, "浅田 彰," which refers to a notable Japanese philosopher, economist and critic, Akira Asada.
- To the right of the pyramids is a sign reading "Long Beach Arena," which is where most of the Live After Death live album was recorded.
- The Syncom sign refers to the 1961 NASA program of the same name.
- The neon sign above the band reads "Maggies Revenge" and refers to British Prime Minister Margaret Thatcher, who appears on the cover of the "Sanctuary" and "Women in Uniform" singles.
- One of the buildings is labelled "Asimov Foundation", a reference to the Foundation series by Isaac Asimov.
- A character wearing a large cloak stands above the walkway's right side, which Riggs claims is Batman.
- Above and slightly to the right of the cloaked character reads more Hebrew lettering, "ג'ין" (Gin, in English).
- On the right side of the walkway and just above the "Latest Results" sign is the bracket that holds Eddie's skull together from the Piece of Mind album onwards, which Riggs drew as a cartouche.
- In the bottom right hand corner all five members of the band are standing in a line. Dickinson is holding a brain, a reference to Piece of Mind album, and drummer Nicko McBrain is wearing aviator goggles (he had a pilot's license by this time, long before Dickinson) and a T-shirt that says "Iron What?". According to Riggs, the band complained because the pictures of themselves were not accurate enough.
- To the right of "Long Beach Arena" is a sign which reads "Hammerjacks", a night club and concert hall in Baltimore, frequented by the band.
- Below Hammerjacks is a sign that reads "Tehe's Bar", which is where the choir vocals in the middle of "Heaven Can Wait" were recorded.
- To the left of the clock is a sign that reads "Herbert Ails", a reference to the author Frank Herbert who wrote the Dune novel, upon which the Iron Maiden song, "To Tame a Land", is based. Herbert had also died that same year, explaining the word "Ails". The reference also refers to the unfriendly response the band received from Herbert (via his agent) regarding permission to use "Dune" as the song's title.
- Beneath the Phantom Opera House sign, there is a sign that reads "EMI REC.". All of the band's albums, outside North America, have been released by EMI Records.

Riggs came up with all the in-jokes and references and it took him 3 months to complete the 15x32 inch painting. The process wore him out completely as he underestimated the complexity of the artwork and said he would never paint anything this convoluted ever again.

== Tour ==
Somewhere on Tour was the official tour held in support of the album. It was the band’s first tour since their grueling World Slavery Tour which was picked on by Bruce Dickinson for being long. Due to this the band cut down this tour and booked 157 shows, 32 less than the World Slavery Tour. The band performed across the globe, in countries including Poland, Italy, the United States and England. The tour lasted 253 days, during which the band performed 151 shows. The tour was a success and commenced in Belgrade, Serbia, Yugoslavia, and ended in Japan which seen them play at the Budokan venue for the first time.

== Reception and legacy ==
Professional ratings
Review scores
Source	Rating
AllMusic	3.5/5 stars
Collector's Guide to Heavy Metal	7/10
Kerrang!	5/5 stars
Sputnikmusic	4.5/5 stars
The Daily Vault	A
Metal.de	10/10
Metal Hammer	4.5/5 stars
Ultimate Guitar	9/10

Somewhere in Time received positive reviews, German reviewer Metal.de gave the album a 10/10 rating stating "Somewhere In Time" is another shining moment in heavy metal from the house of Iron Maiden. Rather than treading water, the metal flagship consistently evolves, paying no heed to scene conventions. In doing so, the band delivers perhaps their finest record to date—and one of the greatest metal albums of all time." Mikesn of Sputnikmusic also gave the album a nearly perfect rating writing "For a band that had hardly changed its style over 5 albums, Somewhere in Time was an adventurous release. Though not as powerful as Powerslave, Somewhere in Time is an excellent effort from Iron Maiden. From the brilliant cover art to the last riff on Alexander the Great, Iron Maiden continued to impress the world with their amazing releases" A reviewer from Ultimate Guitar added "When analyzed alone, it's a good album. When you see how much it influenced their followup, "Seventh Son Of A Seventh Son", it's an exceptional album."

Steve Huey of AllMusic gave the album a more neutral review stating "Somewhere in Time will appeal more to the metal diehard who's already suspicious of too much overt melody; there's plenty of progressive complexity here to impress that type of listener. For the rest of us, even though fully half of the album is still excellent, Somewhere in Time is the first Maiden record that's less than godlike."

Metal Hammer dubbed Somewhere in Time Iron Maiden’s most underrated release of the 1980s.

== Track listing ==
Side one
No.	Title	Writer(s)	Length
1.	"Caught Somewhere in Time"	Steve Harris	7:22
2.	"Wasted Years"	Adrian Smith	5:06
3.	"Sea of Madness"	Smith	5:42
4.	"Heaven Can Wait"	Harris	7:24

Side two
No.	Title	Writer(s)	Length
5.	"The Loneliness of the Long Distance Runner"	Harris	6:31
6.	"Stranger in a Strange Land"	Smith	5:43
7.	"Deja-Vu"	Dave Murray; Harris	4:55
8.	"Alexander the Great" (356–323 B.C.)	Harris	8:35
Total length:			51:18

1995 reissue bonus disc
No.	Title	Writer(s)	Length
1.	"Reach Out" (The Entire Population of Hackney cover)	Dave Colwell	3:31
2.	"Juanita" (Marshall Fury cover)	Steve Barnacle; Derek O'Neil	3:47
3.	"Sheriff of Huddersfield" (based on Urchin's "Life in the City")	Harris; Bruce Dickinson; Smith; Murray; Nicko McBrain	3:35
4.	"That Girl" (FM cover)	Andy Barnett; Pete Jupp; Merv Goldsworthy	5:07
Total length:			16:00

== Personnel ==
Production and performance credits are adapted from the album liner notes.

=== Iron Maiden ===
- Bruce Dickinson – lead vocals, backing vocals on "Reach Out"
- Dave Murray – guitars, guitar synthesiser
- Adrian Smith – guitars, guitar synthesiser, backing vocals, lead vocals on "Reach Out"
- Steve Harris – bass guitar, bass synthesiser
- Nicko McBrain – drums

=== Production ===
- Martin "Masa" Birch – producer, engineer, mixing, tape operator
- Bruce Buchhalter – second engineer
- Sean Burrows – assistant engineer (Compass Point Studios)
- Albert Boekholt – assistant engineer (Wisseloord Studios)
- Ronald Prent – assistant engineer (Wisseloord Studios)
- George Marino – mastering engineer
- Derek Riggs – sleeve illustrations
- Aaron Rapoport – photography
- Rod Smallwood – sleeve concept
- Hugh Gilmour – reissue design (1998 edition)

== Charts ==
Chart (1986–1987)	Peak position
Australian Albums (Kent Music Report)	23
Austrian Albums (Ö3 Austria)	10
Canada Top Albums/CDs (RPM)	15
Dutch Albums (Album Top 100)	2
Finnish Albums (The Official Finnish Charts)	1
German Albums (Offizielle Top 100)	9
Italian Albums (Musica e dischi)	14
Japanese Albums (Oricon)	16
New Zealand Albums (RMNZ)	5
Norwegian Albums (VG-lista)	8
Swedish Albums (Sverigetopplistan)	6
Swiss Albums (Schweizer Hitparade)	22
UK Albums (Official Charts)	3
US Billboard 200	11

Chart (1998)	Peak position
German Albums (Offizielle Top 100)	8

Chart (2010–2013)	Peak position
Finnish Albums (Suomen virallinen lista)	42
German Albums (Offizielle Top 100)	95
Greek Albums (IFPI)	39
Norwegian Albums (VG-lista)	26
Swedish Albums (Sverigetopplistan)	34

Chart (2019–2021)	Peak position
Belgian Albums (Ultratop Flanders)	158
Belgian Albums (Ultratop Wallonia)	47
Hungarian Albums (MAHASZ)	20
Italian Albums (FIMI)	60
Portuguese Albums (AFP)	28
Scottish Albums (Official Charts)	40
Spanish Albums (Promusicae)	39
UK Rock & Metal Albums (Official Charts)	4

== Certifications ==
Region	Certification	Certified units/sales
Brazil (Pro-Música Brasil)	Gold	100,000^{*}
Canada (Music Canada)	2× Platinum	200,000^{^}
Germany (BVMI)	Gold	250,000^{^}
Japan (RIAJ)	Gold	100,000
United Kingdom (BPI)	Gold	100,000^{^}
United States (RIAA)	Platinum	1,000,000^{^}
^{*} Sales figures based on certification alone.^{^} Shipments figures based on certification alone.
