= Can I Play with Madness =

1988 single by Iron Maiden

Single by Iron Maiden

from the album Seventh Son of a Seventh Son
- B-side: "Black Bart Blues"; "Massacre"
- Released: 14 March 1988
- Genre: Heavy metal
- Length: 3:31
- Label: EMI
- Songwriters: Adrian Smith; Bruce Dickinson; Steve Harris
- Producer: Martin Birch

Iron Maiden singles chronology
"Stranger in a Strange Land" (1986)	"Can I Play with Madness" (1988)	"The Evil That Men Do" (1988)

Music video
- "Can I Play with Madness" on YouTube

"Can I Play with Madness" is a song by the English heavy metal band Iron Maiden. The song is the sixteenth single released by the band. Released in 1988, it was the first single from their seventh studio album, Seventh Son of a Seventh Son (1988), and reached number three on the UK Singles Chart.

The song is about a young man who wants to learn the future from an old prophet with a crystal ball. The young man thinks he is going mad and seeks the old prophet to help him cope with his visions/nightmares. The prophet's advice is ignored by the young man and they become angry with each other. The song was originally a ballad named "On the Wings of Eagles", written by Adrian Smith.

Cash Box called it "raging, pulsating metal that should shake up a few speaker cabinets and damage eardrums."

== Music video ==
The video of the song, directed by Julian Doyle, was set at Tintern Abbey and Chislehurst Caves, and features Monty Python’s Graham Chapman; this would be one of his last appearances on television before his death in October 1989 of cancer. In the video, Chapman plays an irritable art instructor who criticizes a young student for including Iron Maiden's mascot Eddie in his sketch of the abbey ruins. The teacher then falls down a hole in the ground, discovers an underground vault and finally encounters an animated version of Eddie, who leers at him from inside a refrigerator. The band appears on a TV screen showing footage from "Run to the Hills" and "The Number of the Beast" promotional videos and the Live After Death concert film. Adrian Smith is shown playing left-handed, suggesting a reversed image.

== Track listings ==
7-inch single

Side one
No.	Title	Writer(s)	Length
1.	"Can I Play with Madness"	Adrian Smith, Bruce Dickinson, Steve Harris	3:31

Side two
No.	Title	Writer(s)	Length
1.	"Black Bart Blues"	Dickinson, Harris	6:39

12-inch single

Side one
No.	Title	Writer(s)	Length
1.	"Can I Play with Madness"	Smith, Dickinson, Harris	3:31

Side two
No.	Title	Writer(s)	Length
1.	"Black Bart Blues"	Dickinson, Harris	6:39
2.	"Massacre" (Thin Lizzy cover)	Phil Lynott, Scott Gorham, Brian Downey	2:54

== "Black Bart Blues" ==
"Black Bart Blues"

Song by Iron Maiden
- A-side: "Can I Play with Madness"
- Released: 1988
- Genre: Heavy metal
- Length: 6:39
- Label: EMI
- Songwriters: Bruce Dickinson, Steve Harris
- Producer: Martin Birch

"Black Bart Blues" appears as a B-side of the "Can I Play with Madness" single. The song is about the suit of armour that rode in the back lounge of the band's tour buses (named Black Bart). Vocalist Bruce Dickinson tells that he, his bandmates and their tour manager were driving in a Ford Thunderbird through Florida in 1983, when they passed a gas station with three suits of armour standing outside. Dickinson stopped the car and went to buy one of the three suits of armour that were on sale. The song's lyrics detail a rather infamous story in which a girl stumbled onto the band's tour bus and struck a deal with one of the band members that she'd give them oral sex in exchange for alcohol.

The song ends with clips of drummer Nicko McBrain that were taken during the Seventh Son of a Seventh Son sessions.

== Personnel ==
Production credits are adapted from the 7 inch vinyl cover.

- Bruce Dickinson – lead vocals
- Dave Murray – guitar
- Adrian Smith – guitar, synthesiser
- Steve Harris – bass guitar
- Nicko McBrain – drums

Production

- Martin Birch – producer, engineer, mixing
- Derek Riggs – cover illustration
- Ross Halfin – photography

== Charts ==
=== Weekly charts ===
Chart (1988)	Peak position
Australia (Kent Music Report)	58
Belgium (Ultratop 50 Flanders)	37
Europe (Eurochart Hot 100)	10
Finland (Suomen virallinen lista)	2
Ireland (IRMA)	3
Netherlands (Dutch Top 40)	14
Netherlands (Single Top 100)	6
New Zealand (Recorded Music NZ)	7
Norway (VG-lista)	4
Sweden (Sverigetopplistan)	12
Switzerland (Schweizer Hitparade)	23
UK Singles (Official Charts)	3
US Mainstream Rock Airplay (Billboard)	47
West Germany (GfK)	23

Chart (1990)	Peak position
UK Albums (OCC) (Note: Re-release of all four singles as part of The First Ten Years box set. Exceeded the length limit of the UK singles chart.) with "The Evil That Men Do"	10

=== Year-end charts ===
Chart (1988)	Position
Netherlands (Single Top 100)	48
