= The Evil That Men Do (song) =

Single by Iron Maiden

from the album Seventh Son of a Seventh Son
- B-side: "Prowler '88"; "Charlotte the Harlot '88"
- Released: 1 August 1988
- Recorded: 1988
- Genre: Heavy metal
- Length: 4:33
- Label: EMI
- Songwriters: Adrian Smith; Bruce Dickinson; Steve Harris
- Producer: Martin Birch

Iron Maiden singles chronology
"Can I Play with Madness" (1988)	"The Evil That Men Do" (1988)	"The Clairvoyant (Live in 1988)" (1988)

Music video
- "The Evil That Men Do" on YouTube

"The Evil That Men Do" is a song by the English heavy metal band Iron Maiden. It is the band's seventeenth single and the second from their seventh studio album, Seventh Son of a Seventh Son (1988). The single debuted at number six in the UK charts and quickly rose to number five. The single's B-sides are re-recordings of "Prowler" and "Charlotte the Harlot" which appear as tracks number one and seven/eight respectively on the band's debut album Iron Maiden.

The title of the song is taken from Marcus Antonius's speech while addressing the crowd of Romans after Caesar's murder (Act 3, scene 2, "The Forum") in William Shakespeare's Julius Caesar: "The evil that men do lives after them; The good is oft interred with their bones." Bruce Dickinson may sometimes repeat this before playing the song, but with the order of the clauses reversed (as he did in Rock in Rio). The poetic lyrics of the song are not related.

The guitar solo in "The Evil That Men Do" is played by Adrian Smith while the guitar solo in "Prowler '88" is played by Dave Murray. In "Charlotte the Harlot '88", the first guitar solo is played by Dave Murray followed by Adrian Smith.

The music video was filmed at The Forum in Inglewood, CA, during the Seventh Tour of a Seventh Tour on 12 June 1988.

== Track listing ==
7" Single

Side one
No.	Title	Writer(s)	Length
1.	"The Evil That Men Do"	Adrian Smith, Bruce Dickinson, Steve Harris	4:33

Side two
No.	Title	Writer(s)	Length
2.	"Prowler '88"	Harris	4:06

12" Single

Side one
No.	Title	Writer(s)	Length
1.	"The Evil That Men Do"	Smith, Dickinson, Harris	4:33

Side two
No.	Title	Writer(s)	Length
2.	"Prowler '88"	Harris	4:06
3.	"Charlotte the Harlot '88"	Dave Murray	4:11

== Covers ==
- An all-star cover of the song can be found on the tribute album Numbers from the Beast which features Fozzy frontman and AEW wrestler Chris Jericho on vocals, Paul Gilbert and Bob Kulick on guitar, Mike Inez on bass, and Brent Fitz on drums. It follows the basic layout of the song, but varies in terms of guitar solos and vocal harmonics.
- Symphonic metal band After Forever covered the song on their Exordium EP.
- A cover by the Finnish heavy metal band, Conquest, featuring Marko Hietala from Nightwish fame on co-vocals can be found on the tribute album Slave to the Power: The Iron Maiden Tribute
- The all-female tribute band The Iron Maidens covered the song on their 2008 EP The Root of All Evil.
- Swedish black metal band Naglfar covered the song on the Regain Records reissue of their album Vittra.
- Finnish progressive metal band Warmen have a song on their debut album "Unknown Soldier" called "The Evil That Warmen Do", assumingly taken from the Iron Maiden song of a similar name.
- Hellsongs also covered this song on their "Pieces of Heaven, a Glimpse of Hell" album.
- Iron Maiden acoustic tributeband Maiden uniteD made an acoustic cover in 2012 on their album "Across the Seventh Sea" featuring Apocalyptica cellist Perttu Kivilaakso.
- Band Крылья (Wings) from Ukraine covered that song with translated title and lyrics on their EP "Крылья". They version was named "То зло, что мы творим".
- A cover by German power metal band Powerwolf is available in the cover album Metallum Nostrum that was originally a bonus disc in the deluxe edition of their 2015 album Blessed & Possessed.
- English horror punk band Creeper recorded a piano-centric cover of the song as part of an all-star Iron Maiden tribute album, Maiden Heaven Volume 2, for Kerrang! magazine released in June 2016.
- Romanian heavy metal band Goodbye to Gravity recorded a cover of the song as a bonus track on their self-titled debut album. This was the last song they performed together before the Colectiv nightclub fire started, who killed 64 concert-goers, along with four of their members.

== Versions ==
Songs	Country & Year	Catalog Number	Format
The Evil that Men Do / Prowler '88	Germany 1988	EMI 006 20 2751 7	Single 7"
The Evil that Men Do / Prowler '88	Japan Promo 1988	EMI PRP-1315	Single 7"
The Evil that Men Do / Prowler '88	UK 1988	EMI EM 64	Black Labels Single 7"
The Evil that Men Do / Prowler '88	UK 1988	EMI EM 64	Silver Labels Single 7"
The Evil that Men Do / Prowler '88	UK 1988	EMI EMG 64	Gatefold Sleeve Single 7"
The Evil that Men Do / Prowler '88 / Charlotte the Harlot '88	EEC 1988	EMI K60 20 2773 6	Maxi Single 12"
The Evil that Men Do / Prowler '88 / Charlotte the Harlot '88	Greece 1988	EMI 052 2027736	Maxi Single 12"
The Evil that Men Do / Prowler '88 / Charlotte the Harlot '88	Italy 1988	EMI 14 2027736	Maxi Single 12"
The Evil that Men Do / Prowler '88 / Charlotte the Harlot '88	Portugal 1988	EMI 2027736	Maxi Single 12"
The Evil that Men Do / Prowler '88 / Charlotte the Harlot '88	UK 1988	EMI 12 EM 64	Maxi Single 12"
The Evil that Men Do / Prowler '88	UK 1988	EMI EMP 64	Shaped Picture Disc
The Evil that Men Do / Prowler '88 / Charlotte the Harlot '88	Japan 1988	EMI CDE12-5740	CD Single
The Evil that Men Do / Prowler '88 / Charlotte the Harlot '88	UK 1988	EMI CDEM 64	CD Single

== Personnel ==
Production credits are adapted from the 7 inch vinyl, 12 inch vinyl, and picture disc covers.

Iron Maiden

- Bruce Dickinson – lead vocals
- Dave Murray – guitar
- Adrian Smith – lead guitar
- Steve Harris – bass guitar, synthesiser
- Nicko McBrain – drums

Production

- Martin Birch – producer, engineer, mixing
- Derek Riggs – cover illustration
- Ross Halfin – photography

== Chart performance ==
Single	Chart (1988)	Peak position	Album
"The Evil That Men Do"	Dutch Singles Chart	23	Seventh Son of a Seventh Son
"The Evil That Men Do"	Irish Singles Chart	4	Seventh Son of a Seventh Son
"The Evil That Men Do"	Norwegian Singles Chart	7	Seventh Son of a Seventh Son
"The Evil That Men Do"	UK Singles Chart	5	Seventh Son of a Seventh Son
Single	Chart (1990)	Peak position	Album
"Can I Play with Madness / The Evil That Men Do"	UK Albums Chart (Note: Re-release of both singles as part of The First Ten Years box set. Exceeded the length limit of the UK Singles chart.)	10	—
