= The First Ten Years (box set) =

Box set by Iron Maiden
- Released: 24 February – 28 April 1990
- Genre: Heavy metal
- Length: 5:41:00
- Label: EMI

Iron Maiden chronology
Seventh Son of a Seventh Son (1988)	The First Ten Years (1990)	No Prayer for the Dying (1990)

The First Ten Years is a series of 10 CDs and double 12" singles by British heavy metal band Iron Maiden, released between 24 February and 28 April 1990, in commemoration of the band's ten-year recording anniversary.

Each CD/double 12" contains two singles, complete with original B-sides and artwork, as well as an edition of "Listen with Nicko", a spoken-word track in which drummer Nicko McBrain would recount the history behind each song specific to that release. Each part in the series included a special voucher, all ten of which could be exchanged by mail order for a limited edition storage box.

Iron Maiden also released The First Ten Years: The Videos on VHS videotape and laserdisc, containing all 16 of the band's promotional music videos up to and including 1990's "Holy Smoke".

== Track listings ==
"Running Free" & "Sanctuary"
No.	Title	Writer(s)	Original Release	Length
1.	"Running Free"	Steve Harris, Paul Di'Anno	1980 ~ Iron Maiden	3:18
2.	"Burning Ambition"	Harris	1980 ~ Running Free	2:41
3.	"Sanctuary"	Harris, Dave Murray, Di'Anno	1980 ~ Iron Maiden	3:14
4.	"Drifter" (Live in 1980)	Harris	1980 ~ Sanctuary	6:03
5.	"I've Got the Fire" (Live in 1980) (Montrose Cover)	Ronnie Montrose	1980 ~ Sanctuary	3:14
6.	"Listen With Nicko! Part. I"	Nicko McBrain		9:29

"Women in Uniform" & "Twilight Zone"
No.	Title	Writer(s)	Original Release	Length
1.	"Women in Uniform" (Skyhooks Cover)	Greg Macainsh	1980 ~ Women in Uniform	3:10
2.	"Invasion"	Harris	1980 ~ Women in Uniform	2:39
3.	"Phantom of the Opera" (Live in 1980)	Harris	1980 ~ Women in Uniform	7:12
4.	"Twilight Zone"	Murray, Harris	1981 ~ Twilight Zone	2:35
5.	"Wrathchild"	Harris	1981 ~ Killers	2:56
6.	"Listen With Nicko! Part. II"	McBrain		8:02

"Purgatory" & "Maiden Japan (EP)"
No.	Title	Writer(s)	Original Release	Length
1.	"Purgatory"	Harris	1981 ~ Killers	3:22
2.	"Genghis Khan"	Harris	1981 ~ Killers	3:07
3.	"Running Free" (Live in 1981)	Harris, Di'Anno	1981 ~ Maiden Japan	3:08
4.	"Remember Tomorrow" (Live in 1981)	Harris, Di'Anno	1981 ~ Maiden Japan	5:46
5.	"Killers" (Live in 1981)	Harris, Di'Anno	1981 ~ Maiden Japan	4:51
6.	"Innocent Exile" (Live in 1981)	Harris	1981 ~ Maiden Japan	4:02
7.	"Listen With Nicko! Part. III"	McBrain		7:42

"Run to the Hills" & "The Number of the Beast"
No.	Title	Writer(s)	Original Release	Length
1.	"Run to the Hills"	Harris	1982 ~ The Number of the Beast	3:55
2.	"Total Eclipse"	Harris, Murray, Clive Burr	1982 ~ Run to the Hills	4:28
3.	"The Number of the Beast"	Harris	1982 ~ The Number of the Beast	4:52
4.	"Remember Tomorrow" (Live in 1981)	Harris, Di'Anno	1982 ~ The Number of the Beast (Single)	5:27
5.	"Listen With Nicko! Part. IV"	McBrain		8:23

"Flight of Icarus" & "The Trooper"
No.	Title	Writer(s)	Original Release	Length
1.	"Flight of Icarus"	Adrian Smith, Bruce Dickinson	1983 ~ Piece of Mind	3:54
2.	"I've Got the Fire" (Montrose Cover)	Montrose	1983 ~ Flight of Icarus	2:40
3.	"The Trooper"	Harris	1983 ~ Piece of Mind	4:14
4.	"Cross-Eyed Mary" (Jethro Tull Cover)	Ian Anderson	1983 ~ The Trooper	3:55
5.	"Listen With Nicko! Part. V"	McBrain		9:49

"2 Minutes to Midnight" & "Aces High"
No.	Title	Writer(s)	Original Release	Length
1.	"2 Minutes to Midnight"	Smith, Dickinson	1984 ~ Powerslave	6:07
2.	"Rainbow's Gold" (Beckett Cover)	Terry Slesser, Kenny Mountain	1984 ~ 2 Minutes to Midnight	4:56
3.	"Mission From 'Arry"	McBrain, Harris	1984 ~ 2 Minutes to Midnight	6:43
4.	"Aces High"	Harris	1984 ~ Powerslave	4:33
5.	"King of Twilight" (Nektar Cover)	Nektar	1984 ~ Aces High	4:53
6.	"The Number of the Beast" (Live in 1983)	Harris	1984 ~ Aces High	4:59
7.	"Listen With Nicko! Part. VI"	McBrain		9:45

"Running Free" (Live) & "Run to the Hills" (Live)
No.	Title	Writer(s)	Original Release	Length
1.	"Running Free" (Live in 1985)	Harris, Di'Anno	1985 ~ Live After Death	3:28
2.	"Sanctuary" (Live in 1985)	Harris, Murray, Di'Anno	1985 ~ Running Free (Live)	4:40
3.	"Murders in the Rue Morgue" (Live in 1984)	Harris	1985 ~ Running Free (Live)	4:32
4.	"Run to the Hills" (Live in 1985)	Harris	1985 ~ Live After Death	4:06
5.	"Phantom of the Opera" (Live in 1984)	Harris	1985 ~ Live After Death	7:28
6.	"Losfer Words (Big 'Orra)" (Live in 1984)	Harris	1985 ~ Run to the Hills (Live)	4:15
7.	"Listen With Nicko! Part. VII"	McBrain		11:54

"Wasted Years" & "Stranger in a Strange Land"
No.	Title	Writer(s)	Original Release	Length
1.	"Wasted Years"	Smith	1986 ~ Somewhere in Time	5:08
2.	"Reach Out" (The Entire Population of Hackney Cover)	Dave Colwell	1986 ~ Wasted Years	3:30
3.	"Sheriff of Huddersfield"	Iron Maiden	1986 ~ Wasted Years	3:35
4.	"Stranger in a Strange Land"	Smith	1986 ~ Somewhere in Time	5:44
5.	"That Girl" (FM Cover)	Andy Barnett, Merv Goldsworthy, Pete Jupp	1986 ~ Stranger in a Strange Land	5:04
6.	"Juanita" (Marshall Fury Cover)	Steve Barnacle, Derek O'Neil	1986 ~ Stranger in a Strange Land	3:46
7.	"Listen With Nicko! Part. VIII"	McBrain		12:20

"Can I Play With Madness" & "The Evil That Men Do"
No.	Title	Writer(s)	Original Release	Length
1.	"Can I Play With Madness"	Smith, Dickinson, Harris	1988 ~ Seventh Son of a Seventh Son	3:32
2.	"Black Bart Blues"	Harris, Dickinson	1988 ~ Can I Play With Madness	6:40
3.	"Massacre" (Thin Lizzy Cover)	Phil Lynott, Scott Gorham, Brian Downey	1988 ~ Can I Play With Madness	2:53
4.	"The Evil That Men Do"	Smith, Harris, Dickinson	1988 ~ Seventh Son of a Seventh Son	4:34
5.	"Prowler" (1988 Version)	Harris	1988 ~ The Evil That Men Do	4:07
6.	"Charlotte the Harlot" (1988 Version)	Murray	1988 ~ The Evil That Men Do	4:11
7.	"Listen With Nicko! Part. IX"	McBrain		10:46

"The Clairvoyant" (Live) & "Infinite Dreams" (Live)
No.	Title	Writer(s)	Original Release	Length
1.	"The Clairvoyant" (Live in 1988)	Harris	1988 ~ The Clairvoyant (Live)	4:27
2.	"The Prisoner" (Live in 1988)	Smith, Harris	1988 ~ The Clairvoyant (Live)	6:08
3.	"Heaven Can Wait" (Live in 1988)	Harris	1988 ~ The Clairvoyant (Live)	7:09
4.	"Infinite Dreams" (Live in 1988)	Harris	1989 ~ Infinite Dreams (Live)	6:02
5.	"Killers" (Live in 1988)	Harris, Di'Anno	1989 ~ Infinite Dreams (Live)	5:01
6.	"Still Life" (Live in 1988)	Murray, Harris	1989 ~ Infinite Dreams (Live)	4:38
7.	"Listen With Nicko! Part. X"	McBrain		11:18

== Chart positions ==
Single	Chart (1990)	Position
"Running Free / Sanctuary": Released: 24 February 1990	Irish Singles Chart	23
"Running Free / Sanctuary": Released: 24 February 1990	UK Albums Chart	10
"Women in Uniform / Twilight Zone": Released: 3 March 1990	UK Albums Chart	10
"Purgatory / Maiden Japan": Released: 10 March 1990	UK Albums Chart	5
"Run to the Hills / The Number of the Beast": Released: 17 March 1990	UK Albums Chart	3
"Flight of Icarus / The Trooper": Released: 24 March 1990	UK Albums Chart	7
"2 Minutes to Midnight / Aces High": Released: 31 March 1990	UK Albums Chart	11
"Running Free (live) / Run to the Hills (live)": Released: 7 April 1990	UK Albums Chart	9
"Wasted Years / Stranger in a Strange Land": Released: 14 April 1990	UK Albums Chart	9
"Can I Play with Madness / The Evil That Men Do": Released: 21 April 1990	UK Albums Chart	10
"The Clairvoyant / Infinite Dreams": Released: 28 April 1990	UK Albums Chart	11
