= 2 Minutes to Midnight =

Single by Iron Maiden

from the album Powerslave
- B-side: "Rainbow's Gold" (Beckett cover); "Mission from 'Arry"
- Released: 6 August 1984
- Recorded: 1984
- Studio: Compass Point (Nassau, Bahamas)
- Genre: Heavy metal
- Length: 6:04
- Label: EMI
- Songwriters: Adrian Smith; Bruce Dickinson
- Producer: Martin Birch

Iron Maiden singles chronology
"The Trooper" (1983)	"2 Minutes to Midnight" (1984)	"Aces High" (1984)

Music video
- "2 Minutes to Midnight" on YouTube

"2 Minutes to Midnight" is a song by the English heavy metal band Iron Maiden, featured on their fifth studio album, Powerslave (1984). It was released as the band's tenth single, and first from the album on 6 August 1984. It rose to number 11 on the UK Singles Chart and number 25 on Billboard Top Album Tracks. The band's first single to exceed five minutes in length, it remained their longest until the release of "Infinite Dreams" in November 1989.

== Synopsis ==
A protest song about nuclear war and the nuclear arms race, "2 Minutes to Midnight" was written by Adrian Smith and Bruce Dickinson. The song attacks the commercialisation of war and how it is used to fuel the global economy ("The golden goose is on the loose and never out of season"), how rich politicians profit directly from it ("as the reasons for the carnage cut their meat and lick the gravy") and how after a war concludes, the world is left in a far worse condition than before the war began, resulting in future wars and the development of more powerful weaponry ("to the tune of starving millions to make a better kind of gun").

The song title references the Doomsday Clock, the symbolic clock used by the Bulletin of the Atomic Scientists, which represents a countdown to potential global catastrophe. In September 1953 the clock reached two minutes to midnight, the closest it ever got to midnight in the 20th century, when the United States and Soviet Union tested H-bombs within nine months of one another. The atomic clock, set at 12 minutes to midnight in 1972, regressed thereafter among US–Soviet tensions, reaching three minutes to midnight in 1984 – the year this track was released – and at that time the most dangerous clock reading since 1953. According to Dickinson, the song critically addresses "the romance of war" in general rather than the Cold War in particular.

Coincidentally, the song, which fundamentally criticises the atomic-weapon-age, was released 39 years to the day after the first use of the atomic bomb, on 6 August 1945, at Hiroshima.

=== "Rainbow's Gold" ===
The first B-side is a cover of British progressive rock band Beckett's "Rainbow's Gold", which was featured on their self-titled album released in 1974. The song was written by Terry Slesser and Kenny Mountain, respectively the band's vocalist and guitarist. On the original release, it is titled "A Rainbow's Gold".

According to Nicko McBrain, commenting on the single in "Listen with Nicko Part VI" (as part of The First Ten Years series), the members of Iron Maiden were friends with members of Beckett.

The band's manager, Rod Smallwood, commented this version: "This was originally done by a band called Beckett who the band liked a lot. Adrian used to do a cover of another of their songs 'Rainclouds' in his band 'Evil Ways'. Beckett were from Newcastle and had a great singer called Terry Wilson Slesser (incidentally I was Beckett's agent prior to meeting Maiden)."

=== "Mission from 'Arry" ===
Another B-side, entitled "Mission from 'Arry", is a recording of an argument between bassist Steve Harris and drummer Nicko McBrain, which took place after a show in Allentown, Pennsylvania, during the band's World Piece Tour. During the concert, Harris' bass gear broke down, so he asked the nearest roadie to tell McBrain to extend his drum solo. The crew member was unable to communicate the message effectively, which distracted McBrain and had a negative impact on his solo, causing him to yell at the roadie afterwards. Vocalist Bruce Dickinson states that he found the ensuing argument so amusing that he decided to record it with a concealed tape recorder.

== Track listing ==
7" single

Side one
No.	Title	Writer(s)	Length
1.	"2 Minutes to Midnight"	Adrian Smith, Bruce Dickinson	6:04

Side two
No.	Title	Writer(s)	Length
2.	"Rainbow's Gold" (Beckett Cover)	Terry Slesser, Kenny Mountain	4:57
Total length:			11:01

12" single

Side one
No.	Title	Writer(s)	Length
1.	"2 Minutes to Midnight"	Smith, Dickinson	6:04

Side two
No.	Title	Writer(s)	Length
2.	"Rainbow's Gold" (Beckett Cover)	Slesser, Mountain	4:57
3.	"Mission From 'Arry"	Steve Harris, Nicko McBrain	6:40
Total length:			17:41

== Personnel ==
Production credits are adapted from the 7-inch vinyl, and 12-inch vinyl covers.

Iron Maiden

- Bruce Dickinson – vocals
- Dave Murray – guitar
- Adrian Smith – guitar
- Steve Harris – bass guitar
- Nicko McBrain – drums

Production

- Martin Birch – producer, engineer
- Derek Riggs – cover illustration
- Ross Halfin – photography

== Cover versions ==
Year	Artist	Album
1988	Decameron	Made in Tribute: A Tribute to the Best Band in a Whole Goddamn World
1999	Deceased	A Call To Irons Vol. 2
2005	The Iron Maidens	World's Only Female Tribute to Iron Maiden
2005	Joe Lynn Turner, Richie Kotzen, Bob Kulick, Tony Franklin, Chris Slade	Numbers From The Beast
2005	Primal Fear	A Tribute to the Beast, Vol. 2
2008	Glamour of the Kill	Maiden Heaven: A Tribute to Iron Maiden
2012	Maiden uniteD	Across The Seventh Sea

== Appearances in other media ==
- It is featured in 2002 video game Grand Theft Auto: Vice City on the in-game radio station V-Rock.
- It appears as a playable track in 2009 music video game Guitar Hero 5, but is heavily censored, due to lyrics referring to the killing of children.
- It is downloadable content for Rock Band console games.
- The 21st episode from the fifth season of American TV series Supernatural is named after the song, aired in 2010.

== Chart performance ==
Single	Chart (1984)	Peak position	Album
"2 Minutes to Midnight"	German Singles Chart	70	Powerslave
"2 Minutes to Midnight"	Irish Singles Chart	10	Powerslave
"2 Minutes to Midnight"	UK Singles Chart	11	Powerslave
"2 Minutes to Midnight"	US Top Rock Tracks	25	Powerslave
Single	Chart (1990)	Peak position	Album
"2 Minutes to Midnight" / "Aces High"	UK Albums Chart (Note: Re-release of both singles as part of The First Ten Years box set. Exceeded the length limit of the UK Singles chart.)	11	—

== See also ==
- List of anti-war songs
