= The Clairvoyant (song) =

"The Clairvoyant (Live in 1988)"

Single by Iron Maiden

from the album Seventh Son of a Seventh Son
- B-side: "The Prisoner (Live)"; "Heaven Can Wait (Live)"
- Released: 7 November 1988
- Recorded: 20 August 1988
- Venue: Monsters of Rock Festival (Donington, UK)
- Genre: Heavy metal
- Length: 4:24
- Label: EMI
- Songwriter: Steve Harris
- Producer: Martin Birch

Iron Maiden singles chronology
"The Evil That Men Do" (1988)	"The Clairvoyant (Live in 1988)" (1988)	"Infinite Dreams (Live in 1988)" (1989)

"The Clairvoyant" is a song by the English heavy metal band Iron Maiden. It is the band's nineteenth single and the third from their seventh studio album, Seventh Son of a Seventh Son (1988). The single, which was also released as a clear vinyl, peaked at number six in the British charts. It contains three live performances from Maiden's 1988 headlining performance at the Monsters of Rock festival in Donington Park.

The promotional video for the song, although set to the studio version, features live clips from the Donington performance.

== Song information ==
The song starts in the first person, from the main character's point of view. Later, when he is dead it is in the third person. According to Steve Harris, the song was inspired by the death of psychic Doris Stokes, and her wondering that if she were truly able to see the future, she would have foreseen her own death.

The song's guitar solo is played by Dave Murray.

== Track listing ==
7" Single

Side one
No.	Title	Writer(s)	Length
1.	"The Clairvoyant"	Steve Harris	4:24

Side two
No.	Title	Writer(s)	Length
2.	"The Prisoner" (Live at Monsters of Rock Festival, Donington, England, 20 August 1988)	Adrian Smith, Harris	6:07

12" Single

Side one
No.	Title	Writer(s)	Length
1.	"The Clairvoyant" (Live at Monsters of Rock Festival, Donington, England, 20 August 1988)	Harris	4:24

Side two
No.	Title	Writer(s)	Length
2.	"The Prisoner" (Live at Monsters of Rock Festival, Donington, England, 20 August 1988)	Smith, Harris	6:07
3.	"Heaven Can Wait" (Live at Monsters of Rock Festival, Donington, England, 20 August 1988)	Harris	7:08

== Personnel ==
Production credits are adapted from the 12 inch vinyl cover.

Iron Maiden

- Bruce Dickinson – lead vocals
- Dave Murray – guitar
- Adrian Smith – guitar, backing vocals
- Steve Harris – bass guitar, backing vocals
- Nicko McBrain – drums

Additional musicians

- Michael Kenney – keyboards

Production

- Martin Birch – producer
- Tony Wilson – producer
- Derek Riggs – cover illustration
- Ross Halfin – photography

== Versions ==
Songs	Country & Year	Catalog Number	Format
The Clairvoyant (Live) / The Prisoner (Live)	Germany 1988	EMI 006-20 3927 7	Single 7"
The Clairvoyant / The Prisoner (Live)	UK 1988	EMI EM 79	Black Labels Single 7"
The Clairvoyant / The Prisoner (Live)	UK 1988	EMI EM 79	Silver Labels Single 7"
The Clairvoyant / The Prisoner (Live)	UK 1988	EMI EMS 79	Poster Sleeve Clear Vinyl Single 7"
The Clairvoyant (Live) / The Prisoner (Live) / Heaven Can Wait (Live)	EEC 1988	EMI K 060 20 3048 6	Maxi Single 12"
The Clairvoyant (Live) / The Prisoner (Live) / Heaven Can Wait (Live)	UK 1988	EMI 12 EM 79	Maxi Single 12"
The Clairvoyant (Live) / The Prisoner (Live) / Heaven Can Wait (Live)	UK 1988	EMI 12EMG 79	Maxi Single 12" Gatefold Sleeve
The Clairvoyant (Live) / The Prisoner (Live)	UK 1988	EMI EMP 79	Shaped Picture Disc 7"
The Clairvoyant (Live) / The Prisoner (Live)	UK 1988	EMI EMP 79	Uncut Picture Disc 12"
The Clairvoyant (Live) / The Prisoner (Live) / Heaven Can Wait (Live)	UK 1988	EMI CDEM 79	CD Single

== Chart performance ==
Single	Chart (1988)	Peak position	Album
"The Clairvoyant"	Irish Singles Chart	7	Seventh Son of a Seventh Son
"The Clairvoyant"	UK Singles Chart	6	Seventh Son of a Seventh Son
Single	Chart (1990)	Peak position	Album
"The Clairvoyant / Infinite Dreams"	UK Albums Chart (Note: Re-release of both singles as part of The First Ten Years box set. Exceeded the length limit of the UK Singles chart.)	11	—
