= Run to the Hills =

Single by Iron Maiden

from the album The Number of the Beast
- B-side: 1982 single; "Total Eclipse"; 1985 live single; "Phantom of the Opera" (live) (7" & 12"); "Losfer Words (Big 'Orra)" (live) (12"); 2002 live single; Part 1; "22 Acacia Avenue (live)"; "The Prisoner (live)"; "Run to the Hills; (Camp Chaos video)"; Part 2; "Children of the Damned (live)"; "Total Eclipse (live)"; "Run to the Hills (video)"
- Released: 8 February 1982; 2 December 1985; 11 March 2002
- Recorded: 1981; 20 March 1982; 28 August 1982; 8–12 October 1984; 14–17 March 1985; 19 January 2001
- Genre: Heavy metal
- Length: 3:51
- Label: EMI
- Songwriter: Steve Harris
- Producer: Martin Birch

Iron Maiden singles chronology
"Purgatory" (1981)	"Run to the Hills" (1982)	"The Number of the Beast" (1982)
"Running Free (Live in 1985)" (1985)	"Run to the Hills (Live in 1985)" (1985)	"Wasted Years" (1986)
"Out of the Silent Planet" (2000)	"Run to the Hills (Live in 2001)" (2002)	"Wildest Dreams" (2003)

1985 live single

2002 CD 2 cover
- Bruce Dickinson as Eddie

2002 Limited Edition Red Vinyl 7"

"Run to the Hills" is a song by the English heavy metal band Iron Maiden. It was released as their sixth single and the first from the band's third studio album, The Number of the Beast (1982). It is their first single with Bruce Dickinson as vocalist. Credited solely to the band's bassist, Steve Harris, Dickinson contributed to the song but could not be credited due to a contractual agreement with his former band Samson. "Run to the Hills" remains one of the band's most popular songs, with VH1 ranking it No. 27 on their list of the 40 Greatest Metal Songs, No. 14 on their list of the Greatest Hard Rock Songs, and Rolling Stone ranking it No. 10 on their list of the 100 greatest heavy metal songs.

A live version of the song, from Live After Death, was released in 1985 and the original single was reissued in 2002, with all income donated to former drummer Clive Burr's MS Trust Fund. In 1990, as part of The First Ten Years box set, both the original and the 1985 live single were reissued on CD and 12" vinyl, combined with "The Number of the Beast" and "Running Free (live)" respectively.

== Background, composition and lyrics ==
Due to contractual issues with his previous band, Samson, Dickinson could not be credited for any of his contributions made during the writing of The Number of the Beast. Although bassist Steve Harris alone receives credit for the song, Dickinson states that he made a "moral contribution" to the song, in addition to "Children of the Damned" and "The Prisoner" from the same album. While speaking at the IBM Smarter Business conference in Stockholm on 10 October 2012, Dickinson revealed that parts of the song are based on the "rising sixth" interval within a scale, inspired by a documentary he watched which explored why "My Way" was one of the most popular recorded songs. Over guitars and a hard rock beat, "Run to the Hills" depicts the historical conflict between Native Americans and European settlers. The song begins with the perspective of the Native Americans: 'White man came across the sea / He brought us pain and misery.' This verse reflects the suffering and upheaval caused by European arrival. The subsequent verses shift to the European viewpoint, with lines such as 'Riding through dust clouds and barren wastes / Galloping hard on the plains' and 'Hunting and killing's a game.' These parts depict the Europeans' actions and attitudes towards the conflict. The recurring chorus, 'Run to the hills / Run for your lives,' serves as a haunting reminder of the dire consequences of these conflicts. Overall, the song presents a vivid portrayal of this tumultuous period in history from both perspectives. The song is in the key of G major with a tempo of 178 beats per minute.

== Original release ==
The song was released as a single on 8 February 1982; 7 weeks prior to the album's release on 29 March 1982. The single marked Iron Maiden's debut release with new vocalist Bruce Dickinson. "Total Eclipse" was selected as the single's B-side over the song "Gangland", which in turn would appear on the initial version of the album. The band later regretted this decision, with Steve Harris commenting, "We chose the wrong track as the B-side. I think if "Total Eclipse" had been on the album instead of "Gangland", it would have been far better." The song was added to The Number of the Beast album when it was remastered in 1998, and was also included in the original Japanese version.

It is the second of three single covers featuring Derek Riggs' depiction of Satan, which debuted on "Purgatory" and later appeared on "The Number of the Beast" covers. According to Riggs, the idea behind the original "Run to the Hills" cover was one of a "power struggle in hell", in which the band's mascot, Eddie, battles Satan with a tomahawk (referencing the song's subject matter).

As of 2017 the single has sold more than 200,000 copies in UK and has been certified Silver by BPI, the first to do so.

== Other releases ==
In 1985, a live version of "Run to the Hills", taken from Live After Death, was released as the band's thirteenth single, along with live versions of "Phantom of the Opera" and "Losfer Words (Big 'Orra)" as its B-sides. According to Riggs, he was asked to paint a cover illustration for both "Run to the Hills" and "Phantom of the Opera" and so the artwork depicts Eddie as the phantom in a hilly landscape.

Following former drummer Clive Burr's announcement that he was suffering from multiple sclerosis, "Run to the Hills" was released again in 2002 to raise money for the newly established Clive Burr MS Trust Fund. Two variations were issued, the original studio version and a live version taken from the Rock in Rio concert, with different B-sides.

== Appearances in media ==
An all-star cover version of the song is found on the 2005 tribute album Numbers from the Beast, featuring Robin McAuley on vocals, Michael Schenker and Pete Fletcher on guitars, Tony Franklin on bass and Brian Tichy (Derek Sherinian, B'z) on drums. The all-female tribute band The Iron Maidens recorded the song on their 2005 debut album, World's Only Female Tribute to Iron Maiden. Former Babes in Toyland singer and guitarist Kat Bjelland's Katastrophy Wife covered the song in their Heart On EP in 2007. The song was covered in 2008 by Sign on the tribute CD Maiden Heaven: A Tribute to Iron Maiden released by Kerrang! magazine. The Swedish lounge metal band Hellsongs included a cover version on their 2008 album Hymns in the Key of 666. In 2009, the eventual Swedish Idol 2009 series winner Erik Grönwall sang it during the live shows and released it as a single in the same year, which peaked at No. 23 in the Swedish Singles Chart. Progressive metal band Dream Theater covered the song live, along with the entire The Number of the Beast album, and released it as an "official bootleg" in 2006.

The song plays at the end of The Terror season 3 episode 1. Star/Executive Producer Dan Stevens is a real life Iron Maiden fan.

== Video ==
The official video features fight scenes from the 1923 silent movie The Uncovered Wagon, a parody on the movie The Covered Wagon, also from 1923.

== Track listing ==
7" single

Side one
No.	Title	Writer(s)	Length
1.	"Run to the Hills"	Steve Harris	3:51

Side two
No.	Title	Writer(s)	Length
2.	"Total Eclipse"	Dave Murray, Harris, Clive Burr	4:24

1985 7" Live single

Side one
No.	Title	Writer(s)	Length
1.	"Run to the Hills" (Live at Long Beach Arena, California, America, 14–17 March 1985)	Harris	4:03

Side two
No.	Title	Writer(s)	Length
2.	"Phantom of the Opera" (Live at Hammersmith Odeon, London, England, 9 October 1984)	Harris	7:27

1985 12" Live single

Side one
No.	Title	Writer(s)	Length
1.	"Run to the Hills" (Live at Long Beach Arena, California, America, 14–17 March 1985)	Harris	4:03

Side two
No.	Title	Writer(s)	Length
2.	"Phantom of the Opera" (Live at Hammersmith Odeon, London, England, 9 October 1984)	Harris	7:27
3.	"Losfer Words (Big 'Orra)" (Live at Hammersmith Odeon, London, England, 8 October 1984)	Harris	4:14

2002 7" Red Vinyl single

Side one
No.	Title	Writer(s)	Length
1.	"Run to the Hills"	Harris	3:51

Side two
No.	Title	Writer(s)	Length
2.	"Total Eclipse" (Live at Hammersmith Odeon, London, England, 20 March 1982)	Burr, Harris, Murray	4:24

2002 Enhanced CD Part. I

Compact Disc
No.	Title	Writer(s)	Length
1.	"Run to the Hills" (Live at Rock in Rio, Rio de Janeiro, Brazil, 19 January 2001)	Harris	5:00
2.	"Children of the Damned" (Live at Hammersmith Odeon, London, England, 20 March 1982)	Harris	4:34
3.	"Total Eclipse" (Live at Hammersmith Odeon, London, England, 20 March 1982)	Murray, Harris, Burr	3:59
4.	"Run to the Hills" (Live video)	Harris	unknown

2002 Enhanced CD Part. II

Compact Disc
No.	Title	Writer(s)	Length
1.	"Run to the Hills"	Harris	3:56
2.	"22 Acacia Avenue" (Live at the Reading Festival, Reading, England, 28 August 1982)	Harris, Adrian Smith	6:34
3.	"The Prisoner" (Live at the Reading Festival, Reading, England, 28 August 1982)	Harris, Smith	5:56
4.	"Run to the Hills" (Camp Chaos video)	Harris	Unknown

2002 Enhanced CD European Edition

Compact Disc
No.	Title	Writer(s)	Length
1.	"Run to the Hills" (Live at Rock in Rio, Rio de Janeiro, Brazil, 19 January 2001)	Harris	5:01
2.	"Run to the Hills"	Harris	3:54
3.	"The Prisoner" (Live at the Reading Festival, Reading, England, 28 August 1982)	Harris, Smith	5:56
4.	"Children of the Damned" (Live at the Hammersmith Odeon, London, England, 20 March 1982)	Harris	4:34
5.	"Run to the Hills" (Live video)	Harris	Unknown

== Personnel ==
=== 1982 studio single ===
Production credits are adapted from the 7-inch vinyl cover.

- Bruce Dickinson – lead vocals
- Dave Murray – lead guitar
- Adrian Smith – rhythm guitar, vocals
- Steve Harris – bass guitar, vocals
- Clive Burr – drums

Production

- Martin Birch – producer, engineer
- Derek Riggs – cover illustration
- Ross Halfin – photography

=== 1985 live single ===
Production credits are adapted from the 7-inch vinyl, and 12-inch vinyl covers.

Iron Maiden

- Bruce Dickinson – lead vocals
- Steve Harris – bass, backing vocals
- Dave Murray – guitar
- Adrian Smith – guitar, backing vocals
- Nicko McBrain – drums

Production

- Martin Birch – producer, engineer, mixing
- Derek Riggs – cover illustration

=== 2002 studio / live single ===
- Bruce Dickinson – lead vocals
- Dave Murray – lead guitar
- Adrian Smith – rhythm guitar, backing vocals
- Janick Gers – rhythm guitar
- Steve Harris – bass, backing vocals
- Nicko McBrain – drums

== Charts ==
=== Run to the Hills ===
Chart (1982)	Peak position
Australian Singles (Kent Music Report)	27
French Singles(SNEP)	64
Germany (GfK)	55
Ireland (IRMA)	16
UK Singles (Official Charts)	7

=== Run to the Hills (Live) ===
Chart (1985)	Peak position
Ireland (IRMA)	18
UK Singles (Official Charts)	26

=== Run to the Hills/The Number of the Beast ===
Chart (1990)	Peak position
UK Singles (Official Charts)	3

=== Running Free (Live) / Run to the Hills (Live) ===
Chart (1990)	Peak position
UK Singles (Official Charts)	9

=== Run to the Hills ===
Chart (2002)	Peak position
Canadian Singles Chart	11
France (SNEP)	73
Finland (Suomen virallinen lista)	5
Germany (GfK)	86
Ireland (IRMA)	38
Italy (FIMI)	6
Netherlands (Single Top 100)	60
Norway (VG-lista)	15
Sweden (Sverigetopplistan)	28
Switzerland (Schweizer Hitparade)	75
UK Singles (Official Charts)	9

== Certifications ==
Region	Certification	Certified units/sales
Australia (ARIA)	Platinum	70,000^{‡}
New Zealand (RMNZ)	Platinum	30,000^{‡}
Spain (Promusicae)	Gold	30,000^{‡}
United Kingdom (BPI)	Platinum	600,000^{‡}
^{‡} Sales+streaming figures based on certification alone.

== See also ==
- List of anti-war songs
