= Aces High (song) =

- Single cover

Single by Iron Maiden

from the album Powerslave
- B-side: "King of Twilight" (Nektar cover); "The Number of the Beast" (live); "Rainbow's Gold" (Beckett cover); "Cross-Eyed Mary" (Jethro Tull cover)
- Released: 22 October 1984
- Recorded: February – June 1984
- Studio: Compass Point (Nassau)
- Genre: Heavy metal
- Length: 4:31
- Label: EMI; Capitol
- Songwriter: Steve Harris
- Producer: Martin Birch

Iron Maiden singles chronology
"2 Minutes to Midnight" (1984)	"Aces High" (1984)	"Running Free (live)" (1985)

Music video
- "Aces High" on YouTube

"Aces High" is a song by English heavy metal band Iron Maiden, written by the band's bassist Steve Harris. It is Iron Maiden's eleventh single release and the second from their fifth studio album, Powerslave (1984).

The first B-side is a cover of Nektar's "King of Twilight", from their 1972 album A Tab in the Ocean. Their cover is actually a medley of the songs "Crying in the Dark" and "King of Twilight", the last two songs on the album. The Japanese 12" was mixed with the B-side covers from "The Trooper" and "2 Minutes to Midnight" singles.

== Song information ==
The song's lyrics are written from the viewpoint of a British RAF pilot fighting during the Battle of Britain (1940), the first military engagement to be fought entirely with aircraft. The artwork depicts the band's mascot, Eddie the Head, in the cockpit of a Supermarine Spitfire, one of the principal aircraft to participate in that battle.

"Aces High" is one of Iron Maiden's most popular songs, and has been covered numerous times. It is featured in the video game Madden NFL 10, the MTV show Nitro Circus, and Steve Peat's segment in the mountain bike film New World Disorder III. Colin McKay used the song on his part of the skate video Plan B Questionable. It can also be found in the soundtrack of the game Carmageddon II: Carpocalypse Now.

The music video, filmed in Poland in September of 1984 during the World Slavery Tour and directed by Jim Yukich, was accompanied with footages of The Battle of Britain as seen on newsreels. The footages were later re-used as the startup for every Iron Maiden concert in the stage screens to accompany the background music (mixing both Churchill's speech and the snippet of the original song.)

== Live performances ==
"Aces High" is frequently used as the opening song for Iron Maiden concerts. As seen in concert videos such as Live After Death and Iron Maiden: Flight 666, it is usually preceded by Winston Churchill's "We shall fight on the beaches" speech with the sound of planes in the background. Churchill's speech was also included at the beginning of the song's music video.

In a 2014 interview with Q magazine, Gerard Way said that "the live version of 'Aces High' off the Live After Death album was the song that first made [him] interested in performing live."

"Aces High" has been performed on six Iron Maiden Tours. It was the set opener for four tours (World Slavery Tour, The Ed Hunter Tour, Somewhere Back in Time World Tour, and Legacy of the Beast World Tour) while it was the first song in the encore for two tours (Maiden England World Tour and Run for Your Lives World Tour).

== Track listing ==
7" single

Side one
No.	Title	Writer(s)	Length
1.	"Aces High"	Steve Harris	4:31

Side two
No.	Title	Writer(s)	Length
2.	"King of Twilight" (Nektar cover)	Nektar	4:49

12" single

Side one
No.	Title	Writer(s)	Length
1.	"Aces High"	Harris	4:31

Side two
No.	Title	Writer(s)	Length
2.	"King of Twilight" (Nektar cover)	Nektar	4:49
3.	"The Number of the Beast" (live at Westfalenhallen, Dortmund, Germany, 18 December 1983)	Harris	4:57

Japanese and Brazilian 12" maxi single

Side one
No.	Title	Writer(s)	Length
1.	"Aces High"	Harris	4:31
2.	"The Number of the Beast" (live at Westfalenhallen, Dortmund, Germany, 18 December 1983)	Harris	4:56

Side two
No.	Title	Writer(s)	Length
3.	"King of Twilight" (Nektar cover)	Nektar	4:50
4.	"Rainbow's Gold" (Beckett cover)	Terry Slesser; Kenny Mountain	4:57
5.	"Cross-Eyed Mary" (Jethro Tull cover)	Ian Anderson	3:52

== Personnel ==
Production credits are adapted from the 7-inch vinyl, and 12-inch vinyl covers.

Iron Maiden

- Bruce Dickinson - vocals
- Dave Murray - guitar
- Adrian Smith - guitar
- Steve Harris - bass guitar
- Nicko McBrain - drums

Production

- Martin Birch – producer, engineer
- Derek Riggs – cover illustration

== Appearances ==
- A version recorded in the summer of 1996 by Arch Enemy was – as guitarist Michael Amott observed in the liner notes to Wages of Sin (on which the cut reappears) – "released on the Japanese Iron Maiden tribute album Made in Tribute. This one turned out really intense, and was easily one of the better songs on a really terrible collection of Iron Maiden cover versions."
- It was covered in 2005 by Jeff Scott Soto (Yngwie Malmsteen), Nuno Bettencourt (Extreme), Billy Sheehan (Mr. Big, Niacin), and Vinny Appice (Black Sabbath, Dio) – drums on the tribute album Numbers from the Beast.
- It was covered in 2006 by Concord Dawn (featuring State of Mind) on the album Chaos by Design.
- It was covered in 2006 by The Iron Maidens on the album World's Only Female Tribute to Iron Maiden
- It was covered in 2008 by Children of Bodom on the album Skeletons in the Closet.
- It was covered in 2011 by Reinxeed on the album 1912.
- It was covered in 2020 by Japanese metal band Nemophila.

== Chart performance ==
Single	Chart (1984)	Peak position	Album
"Aces High"	Irish Singles Chart	29	Powerslave
"Aces High"	UK Singles Chart	20	Powerslave
Single	Chart (1990)	Peak position	Album
"2 Minutes to Midnight / Aces High"	UK Albums Chart (Note: Re-release of both singles as part of The First Ten Years box set. Exceeded the length limit of the UK Singles chart.)	11	—

== See also ==
- List of anti-war songs
