= Seventh Tour of a Seventh Tour =

1988 concert tour by Iron Maiden

- Tour by Iron Maiden
- Official tour advertisement for the band's performance at Mountain View, California, 5 June 1988
- Associated album: Seventh Son of a Seventh Son
- Start date: 28 April 1988
- End date: 12 December 1988
- No. of shows: 102 in total (105 scheduled)

Iron Maiden concert chronology
- Somewhere on Tour (1986–1987); Seventh Tour of a Seventh Tour (1988); No Prayer on the Road (1990–1991)

Seventh Tour of a Seventh Tour was a concert tour by the English heavy metal band Iron Maiden in 1988, in support of their seventh studio album, Seventh Son of a Seventh Son. It was their last tour to feature the World Piece Tour-era lineup until 2000's Brave New World Tour with guitarist Adrian Smith leaving the band in January 1990 and their first to include Michael Kenney (bassist Steve Harris' technician) on keyboards.

== Background ==
In May, the group set out on a Seventh Tour of a Seventh Tour in which they performed to more than two million people worldwide over seven months. After the blockbuster tour in North America, Iron Maiden were headliners of Monsters of Rock festivals in Europe for the very first time. They headlined stadiums and festivals in UK, Germany, Netherlands, Switzerland, France, Italy, Spain, Greece, Czechoslovakia and Hungary. On 20 August 1988, the band headlined the Monsters of Rock festival at Donington Park for the first time before a crowd of 107,000, the largest in Donington's history, and their concerts at the NEC in Birmingham on 27–28 November were released in audio and video formats in 1989; on the home video Maiden England, while the live version of "Infinite Dreams" from the same concerts was released as a single to promote the VHS. Stage set and equipment which has been taken by band was transported in dozen of trucks and was the most elaborate to date and one of the biggest in the world including over 200.000 watts of PA and over 1500 spot lamps.

To recreate the album's keyboards onstage, the group recruited Michael Kenney, Steve Harris's bass technician, to play the keys throughout the tour, during which he performed the song "Seventh Son of a Seventh Son" on a forklift truck under the alias of "The Count" (for which he wore a black cape and mask). Iron Maiden was apparently included in the Guinness Book of World Records Museum in Las Vegas. According to The Guinness Book of Records: "Largest PA system: On Aug 20th 1988 at the Castle Donington 'Monsters of Rock' Festival a total of 360 Turbosound cabinets offering a potential 523kW of programme power, formed the largest front-of-house PA. The average Sound Pressure Level at the mixing tower was 118dB, peaking at a maximum of 124dB during Iron Maiden's set. It took five days to set up the system."

Opening bands included Frehley's Comet.
