= Wasted Years =

Single by Iron Maiden

from the album Somewhere in Time
- B-side: "Reach Out" (The Entire Population of Hackney cover); "Sheriff of Huddersfield"
- Released: 25 August 1986
- Recorded: 1986
- Genre: Heavy metal
- Length: 5:06
- Label: EMI
- Songwriter: Adrian Smith
- Producer: Martin Birch

Iron Maiden singles chronology
"Run to the Hills (Live in 1985)" (1985)	"Wasted Years" (1986)	"Stranger in a Strange Land" (1986)

Music video
- "Wasted Years" on YouTube

"Wasted Years" is a song by the English heavy metal band Iron Maiden. It is the band's fourteenth single released and the first from their sixth studio album, Somewhere in Time (1986). Released in 1986, it was the first single solely written by guitarist Adrian Smith, who also sings backing vocals.

The song reached number 18 in the UK Singles Charts, as well as the top 10 in Finland and the Netherlands' Single Top 100.

== Background ==
The song deals with subject of homesickness and alienation, as well as the negative aspects of the band's nearly year long previous tour and personal problems that Smith and other band members were going through in that period.

Despite guitarist Adrian Smith writing the song on a guitar synthesiser, it is the only song on Somewhere in Time to not feature one.

The cover depicts the band mascot Eddie's point of view as he flies a time machine. Only a part of Eddie's face is seen, as a reflection in a screen. According to artist Derek Riggs, this is because the band did not want to reveal the mascot in his new cyborg guise until the album was released a few weeks later. As with the Somewhere in Time album sleeve, the single cover also features the TARDIS from the BBC series Doctor Who. Riggs describes the illustration as "a duffer. It's a technical illustration of a keyboard of a time machine, with Eddie reflected in the window, because it was the only thing we could think of that wouldn't give Eddie away".

=== Music video ===
The music video for "Wasted Years" featured black-and-white footage of the band performing during a September 1986 band rehearsal in Frankfurt am Main, West Germany. The footage was mixed in with personal home movies, music video clips and photographs from their career up to that point.

== Live performances ==
Adrian Smith has performed the song live with his bands Psycho Motel and Smith/Kotzen, performing the lead vocals himself.

== Track listing ==
7" single

Side one
No.	Title	Writer(s)	Length
1.	"Wasted Years"	Adrian Smith	5:06

Side two
No.	Title	Writer(s)	Length
1.	"Reach Out" (The Entire Population of Hackney cover)	Dave Colwell	3:25

12" single

Side one
No.	Title	Writer(s)	Length
1.	"Wasted Years"	Smith	5:06

Side two
No.	Title	Writer(s)	Length
1.	"Reach Out" (The Entire Population of Hackney cover)	Colwell	3:25
2.	"Sheriff of Huddersfield"	Iron Maiden	3:35

== Cover performances ==
American singer-songwriter Ryan Adams covered "Wasted Years" in 2013 for the soundtrack to the sixth season of the television series Californication. The cover received a negative review from Spin, which called it "neutered" and said "the alt-folk champ’s vocal performance is as maudlin as the lyrics are now revealed to be, liberated as they are from their original badass trappings."

== Personnel ==
Production credits are adapted from the 7-inch vinyl cover.

=== Iron Maiden ===
- Bruce Dickinson – lead vocals; backing vocals on "Reach Out"
- Dave Murray – rhythm guitar
- Adrian Smith – lead guitar, backing vocals; lead vocals on "Reach Out"
- Steve Harris – bass
- Nicko McBrain – drums

=== Production ===
- Martin Birch – producer, engineer, mixing
- Derek Riggs – cover illustration
- Aaron Rapoport – photography

== Chart performance ==
=== Weekly charts ===
Chart (1986)	Peak position
Belgium (Ultratop 50 Flanders)	27
Finland (Suomen virallinen lista)	6
Irish Singles Chart	11
Netherlands (Dutch Top 40)	12
Netherlands (Dutch Single Top 100)	8
New Zealand (Recorded Music NZ)	24
UK Singles Chart	18

Single	Chart (1990)	Peak position	Album
"Wasted Years/ Stranger in a Strange Land"	UK Albums Chart (Note: Re-release of both singles as part of The First Ten Years box set. Exceeded the length limit of the UK Singles chart.)	9	—

=== Year-end charts ===
Chart (1986)	Position
Netherlands (Single Top 100)	72
