= Powerslave =

Studio album by Iron Maiden
- Released: 3 September 1984
- Recorded: February–June 1984
- Studio: Compass Point (Nassau, Bahamas)
- Genre: Heavy metal
- Length: 51:12
- Label: EMI
- Producer: Martin Birch

Iron Maiden chronology
Piece of Mind (1983)	Powerslave (1984)	Live After Death (1985)

Singles from Powerslave
- 1. "2 Minutes to Midnight" Released: 6 August 1984; 2. "Aces High" Released: 22 October 1984

Powerslave is the fifth studio album by the English heavy metal band Iron Maiden, released on 3 September 1984 through EMI Records in Europe, and on 14 September 1984, through its sister label Capitol Records, in the US. It was re-released by Sanctuary and Columbia Records in the US in 2002.

The songs "2 Minutes to Midnight" and "Aces High" were released as singles. Its cover artwork is notable for its Ancient Egypt theme. That theme, taken from the title track, was carried over to the album's supporting tour, the World Slavery Tour. This began in Warsaw, Poland, on 9 August 1984; it is widely regarded as being the band's longest and most arduous tour to date, and led to the live album Live After Death.

The release contains a musical re-telling of Samuel Taylor Coleridge's The Rime of the Ancient Mariner, the lyrics of which include some lines from the poem. At 13 minutes and 45 seconds in length, this was Iron Maiden's longest song for over 30 years until it was surpassed by the 18-minute "Empire of the Clouds" from the 2015 album The Book of Souls.

Powerslave is notable as the band's first album to feature the same personnel as their previous studio release. This lineup would remain intact for two further studio releases. It is also their last album to date to feature an instrumental piece, and the only one until Senjutsu (2021) in which longtime member and guitarist Dave Murray does not have a songwriting credit. (Note: Murray has co-written bonus tracks on Killers (1981), The Number of the Beast (1982) and The X Factor (1995).)

== Background, writing and recording ==
Following their highly successful World Piece Tour in December 1983, during which Iron Maiden headlined large venues and arenas in the US for the first time in their career, the band took three weeks off in January 1984, before regrouping at Le Chalet Hotel in Jersey, where they rehearsed for six weeks. (Note: The History of Iron Maiden: Part 2 – Live After Death documentary erroneously lists the place as Guernsey.) As with Powerslave's predecessor Piece of Mind (1983), this was where most of the album's writing took place; the band then began recording it at Compass Point Studios in Nassau, Bahamas. The album was recorded from February through June 1984.

Once finished, the band undertook another short break while the album was mixed at Electric Lady Studios, New York, before reconvening in Fort Lauderdale, Florida, to rehearse for the World Slavery Tour. The tour began in Poland in August 1984 and ended in California in July 1985. The stage set echoed the album cover, including monumental pedestals several stories high, atop which the musicians appeared at times during the show. The set amply filled even the gigantic proscenium of Radio City Music Hall. The tour was the first time a heavy metal band had taken a full set behind the Iron Curtain, visiting Poland and Hungary, a landmark achievement at the time. It continued into South America – the first time the band had toured there – where they played to an estimated audience of 350,000 at the inaugural Rock in Rio as special guests of the band Queen. The Live After Death album and video, recorded over four nights at Long Beach Arena in LA and Hammersmith Odeon in London, were also released; these respectively peaked at No. 2 and No. 1 in the UK charts.

In total, the tour was eleven months long and touched 28 countries. Powerslave debuted at No. 2 in the UK Albums Chart, as a result of their record company EMI's third Now That's What I Call Music! pop compilation. Eventually, Iron Maiden's fifth studio album achieved No. 12 in US, and went on to give the band their second consecutive platinum selling in the US.

== Songs ==
As with previous albums, the lyrics were inspired by movies and/or pieces of literature, as well as by historical events.

The leading single "2 Minutes to Midnight", written by vocalist Bruce Dickinson and guitarist Adrian Smith, was inspired by the Doomsday Clock ticking at, precisely, two minutes to midnight following the increasing tensions caused by the Cold War, and specifically by Ronald Reagan's anti-Soviet speech "Evil Empire"; according to Smith, it took him and Dickinson about twenty minutes to write the song. Steve Harris wrote the other single (and album opener) "Aces High" inspired by the Battle of Britain and possibly by the 1976 British war film of the same name. In the official video as well as in all live performances, the song was introduced by Winston Churchill's 1940 speech "We shall fight on the beaches".

"Losfer Words (Big 'Orra)" was Iron Maiden's fourth instrumental track and the first they released after "Genghis Khan" (from Killers, 1981); it also was their first instrumental track released since both Bruce Dickinson and Nicko McBrain joined the band. As it happened with "Transylvania", the band originally intended to write lyrics for it, but could not find any fitting theme; after having listened to the music, they agreed upon leaving it as it was, and gave it its title as a pun.

Dickinson's "Flash of the Blade" was inspired by his passion for fencing, while the closing track of Side A, "The Duellists", was inspired to Harris by the 1977 British historical drama film of the same name. "Back in the Village", written by Smith and Dickinson, is a sequel to the 1982 song "The Prisoner" and is based on the British science fiction TV series The Prisoner. The album title track, "Powerslave", is narrated from the point of view of an Egyptian pharaoh wondering why he has to die, he who was considered a god by his people, and was written by Dickinson as a partial allegory of his life as a rock star. The track was chosen as the album's title track and provided the theme for both the cover artwork and the stage decorations.

The album's closer and longest track, "Rime of the Ancient Mariner", is an abridgment of Samuel Taylor Coleridge's poem of the same name. Bassist and songwriter Steve Harris recalled how, under time pressure, the piece was written in a relatively short space of time. Drawing heavily from Coleridge's 1815–16 gloss to his own poem, the song directly quotes two passages, the former including the famous lines: "Water, water everywhere – nor any drop to drink". At over thirteen minutes long, the track contains several distinct sections with differing moods and would become a fan favourite. Harris later stated "It’s okay to write simple pop songs. There’s nothing wrong with that. But if kids went out and checked into Coleridge just because we wrote a song about it, then that’s really something, The same sort of thing happened with "To Tame A Land" on the last album. The amount of people who went out and read Dune by Frank Herbert, which inspired it, was amazing." During the 2008–09 Somewhere Back in Time World Tour, guitarist Dave Murray, Dickinson and Harris cited the song as their favorite to play live.

== Reception and legacy ==
Professional ratings
Review scores
Source	Rating
AllMusic	4.5/5 stars
Collector's Guide to Heavy Metal	9/10
The Daily Vault	A
MusicHound Rock	3/5 stars
The Rolling Stone Album Guide	2.5/5 stars
Sputnikmusic	5/5 stars
Metal.de	10/10
Ultimate Guitar	9.3/10

Powerslave received favorable reviews. Steve Huey of AllMusic gave the album 4.5/5 stars, stating "The third in a trilogy of legendary Iron Maiden albums, Powerslave is frequently ranked as the fan favorite of the bunch, capping off a stellar run that sealed the band's genre-defining status. If The Number of the Beast was the all-time metal landmark, Powerslave is perhaps the quintessential Maiden album, capturing all the signature elements of the band's definitive era in one place."

German reviewer Metal.de gave the album a perfect rating, stating "Powerslave stands as yet another metal monument in Iron Maiden's discography. Even on their fifth outing, Steve Harris and his bandmates did not falter; instead, they raised the bar even higher. The 'World Slavery Tour' that followed the album became the band's longest concert trek to date, shattering every record in its path. Iron Maiden had definitively established themselves as the undisputed spearhead of heavy metal." Ultimate Guitar added "The first thing I can say about the sound on Powerslave is that it always blends in nicely to the theme and the lyrics of the song. The second thing is that all the introductions to the songs just jump straight into your head and when you hear that song again, just by hearing the intro you could name the song. The bass on the album might be called dominating by some people because the bass seems like a different kind if lead guitar which I can kind of agree with."

According to both Nicko McBrain and Adrian Smith, Powerslave began making Iron Maiden famous "very fast, very quickly", such as in Brazil, where hundreds of fans waited outside hotels and restaurants for the band.

The album has also gained a significant amount of accolades and was ranked number 24 on Loudwire’s list of the Top 80 Hard Rock + Metal Albums of the 1980s. It was ranked at number 38 on Rolling Stone's list of "100 Greatest Metal Albums of All Time" in 2017. Also in 2017 WhatCulture ranked it number 2 on their list of the ten greatest metal albums of the 1980s. In 2024 Loudwire dubbed it the best metal album of 1984. Powerslave ranked number 16 on Metal Hammer Germany’s list of the top 500 metal albums of all time in 2024.

In 2024, Iron Maiden celebrated the album's 40th anniversary with a limited edition Zoetrope vinyl.

== In other media ==
The song "Flash of the Blade" was included on the soundtrack of Dario Argento's 1985 horror film Phenomena, and was covered by the American band Avenged Sevenfold on their double live album/DVD Live in the LBC & Diamonds in the Rough (and was later featured on their greatest hits album). Rhapsody of Fire have also recorded a cover of the song that is featured on the deluxe edition of their album From Chaos to Eternity.

== Track listing ==
Side one
No.	Title	Writer(s)	Length
1.	"Aces High"	Steve Harris	4:31
2.	"2 Minutes to Midnight"	Adrian Smith; Bruce Dickinson	6:04
3.	"Losfer Words (Big 'Orra)" (instrumental)	Harris	4:15
4.	"Flash of the Blade"	Dickinson	4:05
5.	"The Duellists"	Harris	6:18

Side two
No.	Title	Writer(s)	Length
6.	"Back in the Village"	Smith; Dickinson	5:02
7.	"Powerslave"	Dickinson	7:12
8.	"Rime of the Ancient Mariner"	Harris	13:45
Total length:			51:12

1995 reissue bonus disc
No.	Title	Writer(s)	Length
1.	"Rainbow's Gold" (Beckett cover)	Terry Slesser; Kenny Mountain	4:57
2.	"Mission from 'Arry"	Harris; Nicko McBrain	6:42
3.	"King of Twilight" (Nektar cover)	Roye Albrighton; Mick Brockett; Allan Freeman; Ron Howden; Derek "Mo" Moore	4:53
4.	"The Number of the Beast" (live)	Harris	4:57
Total length:			21:29

- It was re-released in 1998 with an extra multimedia section, which featured the music videos for "Aces High" and "2 Minutes to Midnight".
- In this same version, the intro of "Powerslave" was moved to the end of "Back in the Village".
- "King of Twilight" incorporates elements of "Crying in the Dark", another song by the same band, taken from their 1972 album A Tab in the Ocean.

== Personnel ==
Production and performance credits are adapted from the album liner notes.

=== Iron Maiden ===
- Bruce Dickinson – vocals
- Dave Murray – guitars
- Adrian Smith – guitars
- Steve Harris – bass guitar
- Nicko McBrain – drums

=== Additional personnel ===
- Martin "Pool Bully" Birch – producer, engineer, mixing
- Frank Gibson – assistant engineer
- Bruce Buchhalter – assistant engineer
- George Marino – mastering
- Derek Riggs – sleeve design, sleeve concept, sleeve illustration
- Moshe Brakha – photography
- Rod Smallwood – sleeve design, sleeve concept
- Simon Heyworth – remastering (1998 edition)
- Ross Halfin – photography (1998 edition)

== Charts ==
Chart performance for Powerslave
Chart (1984–1985)	Peak position
Australian Albums (Kent Music Report)	26
Austrian Albums (Ö3 Austria)	15
Canada Top Albums/CDs (RPM)	21
Dutch Albums (Album Top 100)	5
Finnish Albums (The Official Finnish Charts)	4
German Albums (Offizielle Top 100)	9
Italian Albums (Musica e dischi)	21
Japanese Albums (Oricon)	13
New Zealand Albums (RMNZ)	11
Norwegian Albums (VG-lista)	5
Swedish Albums (Sverigetopplistan)	5
Swiss Albums (Schweizer Hitparade)	10
UK Albums (Official Charts)	2
US Billboard 200	21

Chart (1992)	Peak position
Norwegian Albums (VG-lista)	4

Chart (2006)	Peak position
Italian Albums (FIMI)	64
Spanish Albums (Promusicae)	96

Chart (2013)	Peak position
Finnish Albums (Suomen virallinen lista)	64
Norwegian Albums (VG-lista)	25
Swedish Albums (Sverigetopplistan)	23

Chart (2019–2026)	Peak position
Belgian Albums (Ultratop Flanders)	188
Belgian Albums (Ultratop Wallonia)	109
Croatian International Albums (HDU)	26
Hungarian Albums (MAHASZ)	23
Italian Albums (FIMI)	35
Scottish Albums (Official Charts)	4
Spanish Albums (Promusicae)	73
UK Rock & Metal Albums (Official Charts)	8
UK Albums (Official Charts)	33

== Certifications ==
Certifications for Powerslave
Region	Certification	Certified units/sales
Canada (Music Canada)	2× Platinum	200,000^{^}
Germany (BVMI)	Gold	250,000^{^}
Italy (FIMI) Sales + streams since 2009	Gold	25,000^{‡}
Japan (RIAJ)	Gold	100,000^{^}
Spain (Promusicae)	Gold	50,000^{^}
United Kingdom (BPI)	Gold	100,000^{^}
United States (RIAA)	Platinum	1,000,000^{^}
^{^} Shipments figures based on certification alone.
