= Infinite Dreams =

"Infinite Dreams (Live in 1988)"

Single by Iron Maiden

from the album Maiden England
- B-side: "Killers (Live)"; "Still Life (Live)"
- Released: 6 November 1989
- Recorded: 27–28 November 1988
- Genre: Heavy metal
- Length: 6:05
- Label: EMI
- Songwriter(s): Steve Harris
- Producer(s): Martin Birch

Iron Maiden singles chronology
"The Clairvoyant (Live in 1988)" (1988)	"Infinite Dreams (Live in 1988)" (1989)	"Holy Smoke" (1990)

"Infinite Dreams" is a live single released in 1989 by the English heavy metal band Iron Maiden. It is the only single to be released in sync with a home video; 1989's Maiden England. The performance was recorded in Birmingham, England in 1988 towards the end of the massive world tour to support the album where the song originally appeared, being Seventh Son of a Seventh Son. It was the band's final single to feature "The Trooper"-era lineup for an entire decade until 2000's single "The Wicker Man" with guitarist Adrian Smith leaving the band in January 1990 after he did not approve of the direction the band were aiming for on their next album No Prayer for the Dying.

== Synopsis ==
The song is about how the character of the song sees disturbing visions about afterlife and other mystic things in his dreams, but is scared about if he will ever be able to wake up again. It starts with a soft guitar solo, which is then joined by Bruce Dickinson's singing as well as the rest of the band. The song starts out quite peaceful, but gets progressively heavier towards the song's climax and the following final verse. Steve Harris has explained, "I do have nightmares, but usually only when we’re writing an album. Then your mind just gets so overactive with all these ideas flying about inside that it’s difficult to sleep. That’s what 'Infinite Dreams' is about".

== Track listing ==
7" single

Side one
No.	Title	Writer(s)	Length
1.	"Infinite Dreams" (Live at the National Exhibition Centre, Birmingham, England, 27–28 November 1988)	Steve Harris	6:05

Side two
No.	Title	Writer(s)	Length
2.	"Killers" (Live at the National Exhibition Centre, Birmingham, England, 27–28 November 1988)	Harris, Paul Di'Anno	5:01

12" single

Side one
No.	Title	Writer(s)	Length
1.	"Infinite Dreams" (Live at the National Exhibition Centre, Birmingham, England, 27–28 November 1988)	Harris	6:05

Side two
No.	Title	Writer(s)	Length
2.	"Killers" (Live at the National Exhibition Centre, Birmingham, England, 27–28 November 1988)	Harris, Di'Anno	5:01
3.	"Still Life" (Live at the National Exhibition Centre, Birmingham, England, 27–28 November 1988)	Dave Murray, Harris	4:39

== Personnel ==
Production credits are adapted from the 7 inch vinyl cover.

Iron Maiden

- Bruce Dickinson – vocals
- Dave Murray – guitar
- Adrian Smith – guitar
- Steve Harris – bass guitar
- Nicko McBrain – drums

Production

- Martin Birch – producer, engineer, mixing
- Derek Riggs – cover illustration
- George Bodnar – photography

== Versions ==
Songs	Country & Year	Catalog Number	Format
Infinite Dreams (Live) / Killers (Live)	UK 1989	EMI EMS 117	Black Labels Single 7"
Infinite Dreams (Live) / Killers (Live)	UK 1989	EMI EM 117	Silver Labels Single 7"
Infinite Dreams (Live) / Killers (Live) / Still Life (Live)	UK 1989	EMI 12 EM 117	Maxi Single 12"
Infinite Dreams (Live) / Killers (Live) / Still Life (Live)	UK 1989	EMI 12 EMP 117	Maxi Single Poster Sleeve 12"
Infinite Dreams (Live) / Killers (Live)	UK 1989	EMI EMP 117	Shaped Picture Disc 7"
Infinite Dreams (Live) / Killers (Live)	UK 1989	EMI EMP 117	Uncut Picture Disc 12"
Infinite Dreams (Live) / Killers (Live) / Still Life (Live)	UK 1989	EMI CDEM 117	CD single
Infinite Dreams (Live) / Killers (Live)	UK 1989	EMI TCM 117	Cassette single

== Chart performance ==
Single	Chart (1989)	Peak position	Album
"Infinite Dreams"	Irish Singles Chart	6	Seventh Son of a Seventh Son / Maiden England
"Infinite Dreams"	UK singles chart	6	Seventh Son of a Seventh Son / Maiden England
Single	Chart (1990)	Peak position	Album
"The Clairvoyant / Infinite Dreams"	UK Albums Chart (Note: Re-release of both singles as part of The First Ten Years box set. Exceeded the length limit of the UK singles chart.)	11	—

=== Cover versions ===
"Infinite Dreams" was covered on the album Across The Seventh Sea by the acoustic tribute project Maiden uniteD, featuring vocalist Damian Wilson and Apocalyptica cellist Perttu Kivilaakso.

It is also included on Covers All by Waltari.
