= Somewhere on Tour =

1986–1987 concert tour by Iron Maiden

- Tour by Iron Maiden
- Official tour advertisement for the band's performance in Stockholm, 14 November 1986
- Associated album: Somewhere in Time
- Start date: 10 September 1986
- End date: 21 May 1987
- No. of shows: 151 in total (156 scheduled)

Iron Maiden concert chronology
- World Slavery Tour (1984–1985); Somewhere on Tour (1986–1987); Seventh Tour of a Seventh Tour (1988)

Somewhere on Tour was a concert tour by the English heavy metal band Iron Maiden, from 10 September 1986 to 21 May 1987, supporting their album Somewhere in Time. The band performed across the globe, in countries including Poland, Italy, the United States and England. The tour lasted 253 days, during which the band performed 151 shows. The tour commenced in Belgrade, Serbia, Yugoslavia.

== Background ==
Somewhere on Tour was the official tour held in support of their 1986 album Somewhere in Time. It was also the band’s first tour since their grueling World Slavery Tour which was picked on by lead singer Bruce Dickinson for being long. Due to this the band cut down this tour and booked 157 shows 32 less than the World Slavery Tour. The tour also seen Iron Maiden play at the prestigious Budokan venue in Japan for the first time.

The Somewhere on Tour production was more ambitious than their previous tours. The band used seven or eight 45 foot articulated trucks which held over 100 tons of equipment, three crowd buses for 60 people and two nightliners for five musicians. Total power (PA and stage monitors) was estimated at 180.000 watts. The vast and flexible lighting rig held over 1100 lamps hung over a futuristic stage set that included flying space ships, inflatable props, laser guns, pyrotechnics, hydraulic stands and backdrops.

On 3 November, BBC's Jim'll Fix It filmed the Hammersmith concert documenting a wish from a 14-year-old fan named Dominic Lawson who went to become a roadie for the concert. He ended up receiving a gold disc record for helping the band and the staff for preparing the concert on that day.

== Tour dates ==
List of 1986 concerts
Date	City	Country	Venue	Opening Act
10 September 1986	Belgrade	Yugoslavia	Pionir Hall	Waysted
11 September 1986	Zagreb	Yugoslavia	Dom Sportova	Waysted
12 September 1986	Ljubljana	Yugoslavia	Tivoli Hall	Waysted
14 September 1986	Vienna	Austria	Donauinsel	Waysted
15 September 1986	Graz	Austria	Eishalle Liebenau	Waysted
17 September 1986	Budapest	Hungary	MTK Stadion	Waysted
19 September 1986	Zabrze	Poland	Hala Makoszowy	—N/a
20 September 1986	Wrocław	Poland	Hala Ludowa	—N/a
21 September 1986	Poznań	Poland	Hala Arena	—N/a
23 September 1986	Gdańsk	Poland	Hala Olivia	—N/a
24 September 1986	Łódź	Poland	Hala Sportowa	—N/a
25 September 1986	Warsaw	Poland	Torwar Hall	—N/a
3 October 1986	Oxford	England	Apollo Theatre Oxford	Paul Samson's Empire
4 October 1986	St Austell	England	Cornwall Coliseum	Paul Samson's Empire
6 October 1986	Cardiff	Wales	St David's Hall	Paul Samson's Empire
7 October 1986	Cardiff	Wales	St David's Hall	Paul Samson's Empire
8 October 1986	Bristol	England	Colston Hall	Paul Samson's Empire
10 October 1986	Manchester	England	Manchester Apollo	Paul Samson's Empire
11 October 1986	Manchester	England	Manchester Apollo	Paul Samson's Empire
12 October 1986	Liverpool	England	Empire Theatre	Paul Samson's Empire
14 October 1986	Leicester	England	De Montfort Hall	Paul Samson's Empire
15 October 1986	Sheffield	England	Sheffield City Hall	Paul Samson's Empire
16 October 1986	Sheffield	England	Sheffield City Hall	Paul Samson's Empire
~~18 October 1986~~	~~Ipswich~~	England	~~Gaumont Theatre~~	—N/a
20 October 1986	Nottingham	England	Royal Concert Hall	Paul Samson's Empire
21 October 1986	Bradford	England	St. George's Hall	Paul Samson's Empire
22 October 1986	Hanley	England	Victoria Hall	Paul Samson's Empire
24 October 1986	Newcastle	England	Newcastle City Hall	Paul Samson's Empire
25 October 1986	Newcastle	England	Newcastle City Hall	Paul Samson's Empire
27 October 1986	Edinburgh	Scotland	Edinburgh Playhouse	Paul Samson's Empire
28 October 1986	Edinburgh	Scotland	Edinburgh Playhouse	Paul Samson's Empire
30 October 1986	Birmingham	England	Birmingham Odeon	Paul Samson's Empire
31 October 1986	Birmingham	England	Birmingham Odeon	Paul Samson's Empire
1 November 1986	Birmingham	England	Birmingham Odeon	Paul Samson's Empire
3 November 1986	London	England	Hammersmith Odeon	Paul Samson's Empire
4 November 1986	London	England	Hammersmith Odeon	Paul Samson's Empire
5 November 1986	London	England	Hammersmith Odeon	Paul Samson's Empire
7 November 1986	London	England	Hammersmith Odeon	Paul Samson's Empire
8 November 1986	London	England	Hammersmith Odeon	Paul Samson's Empire
9 November 1986	London	England	Hammersmith Odeon	Paul Samson's Empire; Bad News
12 November 1986	Helsinki	Finland	Helsinki Ice Hall	W.A.S.P.
14 November 1986	Stockholm	Sweden	Johanneshovs Isstadion	W.A.S.P.
15 November 1986	Gothenburg	Sweden	Scandinavium	W.A.S.P.
17 November 1986	Drammen	Norway	Drammenshallen	—N/a
18 November 1986	Malmö	Sweden	Malmö Isstadion	W.A.S.P.
20 November 1986	Offenbach	West Germany	Stadthalle	W.A.S.P.
21 November 1986	Böblingen	West Germany	Sporthalle	W.A.S.P.
22 November 1986	Hanover	West Germany	Eilenriedehalle	W.A.S.P.
23 November 1986	Leiden	Netherlands	Groenoordhallen	W.A.S.P.
25 November 1986	Essen	West Germany	Grugahalle	W.A.S.P.
26 November 1986	Munich	West Germany	Rudi-Sedlmayer-Halle	W.A.S.P.
28 November 1986	Brussels	Belgium	Forest National	W.A.S.P.
29 November 1986	Paris	France	Palais Omnisports de Paris-Bercy	W.A.S.P. Vulcain
1 December 1986	Barcelona	Spain	Palau dels Esports de Barcelona	W.A.S.P.
2 December 1986	Madrid	Spain	Pabellón Deportivo Real Madrid	W.A.S.P.
3 December 1986	Madrid	Spain	Pabellón Deportivo Real Madrid	W.A.S.P.
5 December 1986	Lisbon	Portugal	Pavilhão de Cascais	W.A.S.P.
7 December 1986	Toulouse	France	Petit Palais des Sports	W.A.S.P.
8 December 1986	Montpellier	France	Le Zénith	W.A.S.P.
9 December 1986	Lyon	France	Palais des Sports	W.A.S.P.
11 December 1986	Nuremberg	West Germany	Hemmerleinhalle	W.A.S.P.
12 December 1986	Ludwigshafen	West Germany	Friedrich-Ebert-Halle	W.A.S.P.
13 December 1986	Lausanne	Switzerland	Halle des Fêtes	W.A.S.P.
15 December 1986	Turin	Italy	Teatro Tenda	W.A.S.P.
16 December 1986	Milan	Italy	Palatrussardi	W.A.S.P.
17 December 1986	Florence	Italy	Palasport	W.A.S.P.
18 December 1986	Naples	Italy	Teatro Tenda	W.A.S.P.

List of 1987 concerts
Date	City	Country	Venue	Opening Act
7 January 1987	Hampton	United States	Hampton Coliseum	Yngwie Malmsteen's Rising Force
8 January 1987	Landover	United States	Capital Centre	Yngwie Malmsteen's Rising Force
9 January 1987	Pittsburgh	United States	Civic Arena	Yngwie Malmsteen's Rising Force
11 January 1987	Troy	United States	RPI Field House	Yngwie Malmsteen's Rising Force
12 January 1987	New Haven	United States	New Haven Coliseum	Yngwie Malmsteen's Rising Force
13 January 1987	Philadelphia	United States	Spectrum	Yngwie Malmsteen's Rising Force
16 January 1987	Jacksonville	United States	Jacksonville Coliseum	Yngwie Malmsteen's Rising Force
17 January 1987	Pembroke Pines	United States	Hollywood Sportatorium	Yngwie Malmsteen's Rising Force
18 January 1987	Lakeland	United States	Lakeland Civic Center Arena	Yngwie Malmsteen's Rising Force
20 January 1987	Atlanta	United States	The Omni	Yngwie Malmsteen's Rising Force
22 January 1987	Dallas	United States	Reunion Arena	Vinnie Vincent Invasion
23 January 1987	Austin	United States	Frank Erwin Center	Vinnie Vincent Invasion
~~24 January 1987~~	~~Beaumont~~	United States	~~Beaumont Civic Center~~	—N/a
26 January 1987	Lubbock	United States	Lubbock Municipal Coliseum	Vinnie Vincent Invasion
27 January 1987	Norman	United States	Lloyd Noble Center	Vinnie Vincent Invasion
28 January 1987	Tulsa	United States	Tulsa Convention Center	Vinnie Vincent Invasion
30 January 1987	Houston	United States	The Summit	Vinnie Vincent Invasion
31 January 1987	San Antonio	United States	San Antonio Convention Center Arena	Vinnie Vincent Invasion
1 February 1987	Corpus Christi	United States	Corpus Christi Memorial Coliseum	Vinnie Vincent Invasion
3 February 1987	Amarillo	United States	Amarillo Civic Center	Vinnie Vincent Invasion
4 February 1987	Wichita	United States	Kansas Coliseum	Vinnie Vincent Invasion
6 February 1987	Denver	United States	McNichols Sports Arena	Vinnie Vincent Invasion
8 February 1987	Salt Lake City	United States	Salt Palace	Vinnie Vincent Invasion
10 February 1987	Tacoma	United States	Tacoma Dome	Vinnie Vincent Invasion
11 February 1987	Portland	United States	Memorial Coliseum	Vinnie Vincent Invasion
13 February 1987	Sacramento	United States	ARCO Arena	Vinnie Vincent Invasion
14 February 1987	San Bernardino	United States	Orange Pavilion	Vinnie Vincent Invasion
16 February 1987	Long Beach	United States	Long Beach Arena	Vinnie Vincent Invasion
17 February 1987	Long Beach	United States	Long Beach Arena	Vinnie Vincent Invasion
18 February 1987	Long Beach	United States	Long Beach Arena	Vinnie Vincent Invasion
21 February 1987	Oakland	United States	Oakland-Alameda County Coliseum	Vinnie Vincent Invasion
22 February 1987	Fresno	United States	Selland Arena	Vinnie Vincent Invasion
24 February 1987	San Diego	United States	San Diego Sports Arena	Vinnie Vincent Invasion
25 February 1987	Phoenix	United States	Arizona Veterans Memorial Coliseum	Vinnie Vincent Invasion
26 February 1987	Tucson	United States	Tucson Convention Center Arena	Vinnie Vincent Invasion
27 February 1987	El Paso	United States	El Paso County Coliseum	Vinnie Vincent Invasion
28 February 1987	El Paso	United States	El Paso County Coliseum	Vinnie Vincent Invasion
1 March 1987	Fort Worth	United States	Daniel-Meyer Coliseum	Vinnie Vincent Invasion
3 March 1987	Albuquerque	United States	Tingley Coliseum	Vinnie Vincent Invasion
5 March 1987	Omaha	United States	Omaha Civic Auditorium Arena	Vinnie Vincent Invasion
6 March 1987	Kansas City	United States	Kansas City Municipal Auditorium	Vinnie Vincent Invasion
7 March 1987	St. Louis	United States	Kiel Auditorium	Vinnie Vincent Invasion
8 March 1987	Milwaukee	United States	MECCA Arena	Waysted
9 March 1987	Madison	United States	Dane County Coliseum	Waysted
11 March 1987	Rosemont	United States	Rosemont Horizon	Waysted
13 March 1987	Cincinnati	United States	Cincinnati Gardens	Waysted
14 March 1987	Richfield	United States	Richfield Coliseum	Waysted
15 March 1987	Battle Creek	United States	Kellogg Arena	Waysted
17 March 1987	Saginaw	United States	Wendler Arena	Waysted
18 March 1987	Detroit	United States	Joe Louis Arena	Waysted
19 March 1987	Indianapolis	United States	Market Square Arena	Waysted
21 March 1987	Toronto	Canada	Maple Leaf Gardens	Waysted
22 March 1987	Toronto	Canada	Maple Leaf Gardens	Waysted
24 March 1987	Montreal	Canada	Montreal Forum	Waysted
25 March 1987	Quebec City	Canada	Colisée de Quebec	Waysted
27 March 1987	Bethlehem	United States	Stabler Arena	Waysted
28 March 1987	East Rutherford	United States	Brendan Byrne Arena	Waysted
30 March 1987	Providence	United States	Providence Civic Center	Waysted
31 March 1987	Worcester	United States	Centrum in Worcester	Waysted
2 April 1987	New York City	United States	Madison Square Garden	Waysted
4 April 1987	Charlotte	United States	Charlotte Coliseum	Waysted
5 April 1987	Greensboro	United States	Greensboro Coliseum	Waysted
7 April 1987	Baltimore	United States	Baltimore Arena	Waysted
9 April 1987	Dayton	United States	Hara Arena	Waysted
10 April 1987	Buffalo	United States	Buffalo Memorial Auditorium	Waysted
11 April 1987	Johnstown	United States	Cambria County War Memorial Arena	Waysted
13 April 1987	Rochester	United States	Rochester Community War Memorial	Waysted
14 April 1987	Toledo	United States	Toledo Sports Arena	Waysted
15 April 1987	Columbus	United States	Ohio Center	Waysted
17 April 1987	Bloomington	United States	Met Center	Waysted
20 April 1987	Winnipeg	Canada	Winnipeg Arena	Waysted
21 April 1987	Regina	Canada	Agridome	Waysted
22 April 1987	Edmonton	Canada	Northlands Coliseum	Waysted
24 April 1987	Calgary	Canada	Olympic Saddledome	Waysted
26 April 1987	Vancouver	Canada	Pacific Coliseum	Waysted
28 April 1987	Reno	United States	Lawlor Events Center	Waysted
29 April 1987	Paradise	United States	Thomas & Mack Center	Waysted
30 April 1987	Daly City	United States	Cow Palace	Waysted
1 May 1987	San Jose	United States	Spartan Stadium	Y&T; Tesla; Waysted
2 May 1987	Irvine	United States	Irvine Meadows Amphitheatre	Waysted
11 May 1987	Nagoya	Japan	Nagoya-shi Kōkaidō	—N/a
13 May 1987	Tokyo	Japan	Nippon Budokan	—N/a
15 May 1987	Tokyo	Japan	NHK Hall	—N/a
16 May 1987	Kyoto	Japan	Kyoto Kaikan	—N/a
18 May 1987	Hiroshima	Japan	Kōsei Nenkin Kaikan	—N/a
20 May 1987	Osaka	Japan	Festival Hall	—N/a
21 May 1987	Osaka	Japan	Festival Hall	—N/a

=== Cancellations ===
- 18 October 1986: Ipswich, England, Gaumont Theatre; CANCELLED (Due to health problems.)
- 19 December 1986: Rome, Italy, Teatro Tenda; CANCELLED
- 20 December 1986: Bologna, Italy, Teatro Tenda; CANCELLED
- 21 December 1986: Padua, Italy, Teatro Tenda; CANCELLED
- 24 January 1987: Beaumont, United States, Beaumont Civic Center; CANCELLED (Due to poor ticket sales.)
