= Ross Halfin =

British rock and roll photographer (born 1957)

- Born: 11 August 1957 (age 69); London, England
- Occupations: Photographer, concert photography
- Website: rosshalfin.com

Ross William Halfin (born 11 August 1957) is a British rock music photographer. Since the late 1970s he has worked for some of the biggest acts in rock and heavy metal, including Led Zeppelin, AC/DC, Black Sabbath, The Who, Kiss, Metallica, Iron Maiden, Judas Priest, Van Halen, Def Leppard, UFO and many others.

== Early life ==
Halfin was born and raised in Wimbledon Chase, London to a Scottish mother and Russian father.

His father Lazarus was a Russian Jewish actor, who then became a music publisher. He had a number one hit in 1957 as writer of the song "You're a Pink Toothbrush". which was a UK number one single for Max Bygraves. His uncle Dennis was a commando who was captured by the Nazis in Crete during World War II. Because he was Jewish, he threw away his ID card, stating he was Canadian and then spent four years as a prisoner of war in Colditz.

Halfin originally wanted to be an artist when he grew up. He attended the Wimbledon School of Art starting in 1975 where he studied painting.

Disillusioned with the school's preoccupation with Modernism, he started shooting music photography, bringing his camera along to rock concerts, which he could do with no restrictions at the time. He later claimed he became a rock photographer by accident.

== Career ==
Halfin shoots both freelance and assignment pieces, for magazines and clients directly.

He has toured with many bands, including Metallica, Iron Maiden, Status Quo, Def Leppard, The Who, AC/DC, Led Zeppelin, Jam, Blondie, Mötley Crüe, Van Halen, Aerosmith, The Black Crowes, Ozzy Osbourne, Kiss, Soundgarden, Queens of the Stone Age and The Mars Volta.

=== 1970s ===
Halfin began his career working for Sounds magazine in the 1970s, shooting various artists on the punk scene including The Clash, The Jam, The Sex Pistols, 999 and The Adverts.

=== 1980s ===
After linking up with writers Geoff Barton and Peter Makowski, Halfin moved on to working mainly in the US with bands such as Iron Maiden, AC/DC, Bon Jovi, UFO, Rush, Journey, Aerosmith and Black Sabbath.

In 1980, Halfin became chief photographer of new music magazine Kerrang!, photographing their first cover of AC/DC. He continued shooting with them for the next 20 years.

Halfin took the last photo of Bon Scott alive in 1980, alongside UFO bassist Pete Way.

=== 1990s ===
In the 1990s, Halfin took to travel photography on a casual but obscure basis, but his work would later resurface in an issue of Genesis Publications in 2011.

=== 2000s ===
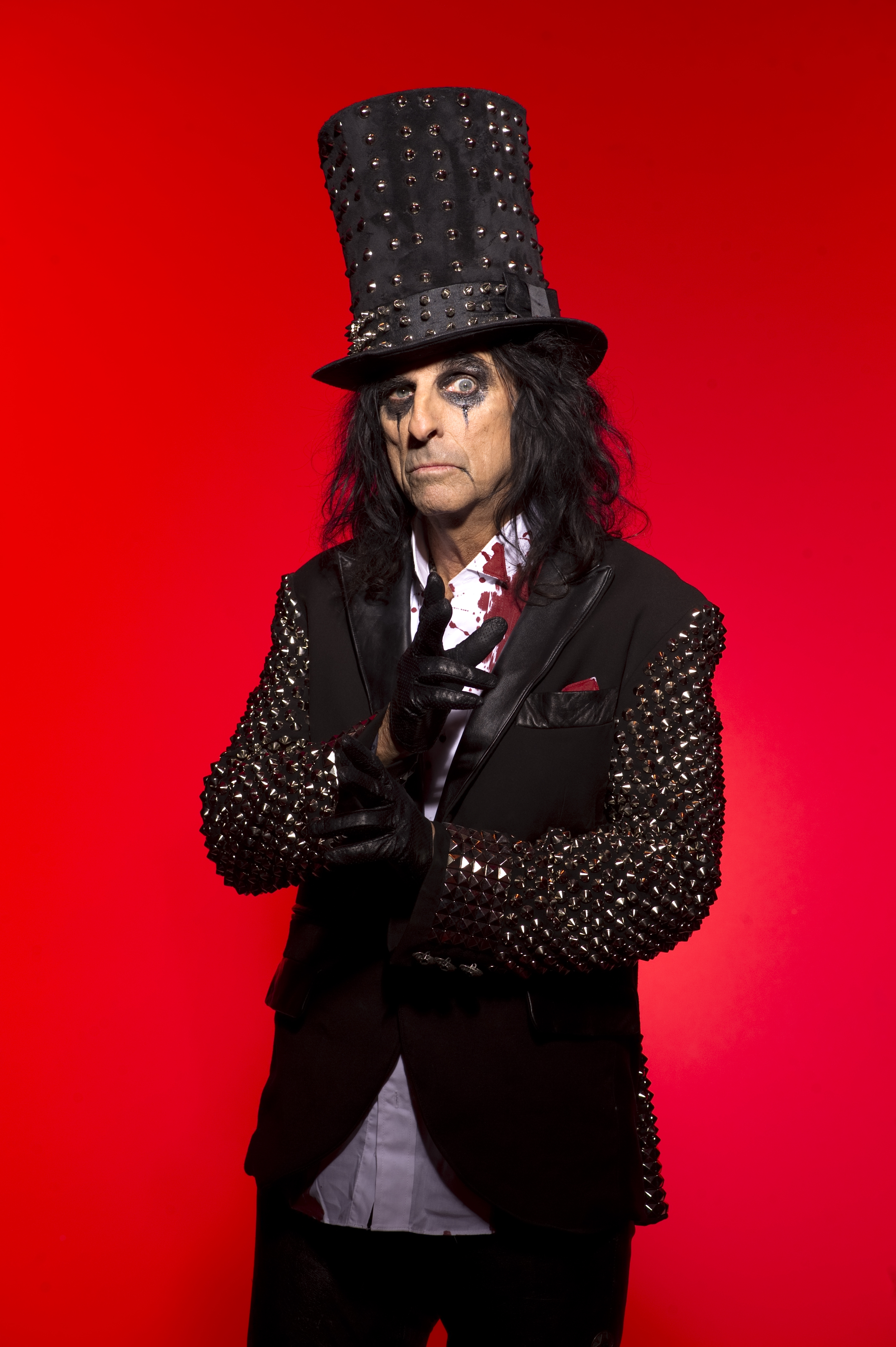
Photo of Alice Cooper by Halfin in 2011

Halfin worked with Eminem and Slayer, and started working with Metallica again in 2007.

He attended the Closing Ceremony of the 2008 Olympics Games accompanying Jimmy Page.

=== 2010s ===
Continued to shoot Metallica along with other mainly hard rock and metal bands, alongside travel.

In 2011 he confirmed he prefers trees to humans, stating "a tree isn't going to shout at you and it doesn't have 10 people around it screaming: 'We've got to wrap this up right now, mate'".

=== 2020s ===
He released Led Zeppelin Vinyl: The Essential Collection book in 2021. Started doing Q&A signing with Metallica during M72 World Tour dates across the world, while all-but-stopping his infamous Diary. In 2025, Ross started working with Black Sabbath for their final show, Back to the Beginning.

== Personal life ==
Halfin lives in the London suburb Cheam. He is good friends with Jimmy Page and Rod Smallwood.

== Exhibitions ==
- The Age of Rock, 2015, Flo Peters Gallery, Hamburg, Germany
- The Ultimate Metallica, 2010, Blender Gallery, Sydney, Australia
- Made of Metal, 2005, Proud Galleries, London, England

== Books ==
- Iron Maiden: Running Free - The Official Story of Iron Maiden, 1984, Zomba Books
- Iron Maiden: A photographic history, 1988
- The Photographer's Led Zeppelin, 1995
- Fragile: Human Organs, 1996
- Metallica, 1996
- Ross Halfin's Work: Bon Jovi, 1996
- Maximum Who: The Who In The Sixties, 1996
- Iron Maiden, 2008, Vision On Publishing
- The Ultimate Metallica, 2010
- Def Leppard: The Definitive Visual History, 2011
- Sojourner: Ross Halfin Travels, 2011, Genesis Publications
- Metallica: The Black Album in Black & White, 2021
- Pete Way by Ross Halfin, 2021
- Ritchie Blackmore by Ross Halfin, 2021
- Led Zeppelin Vinyl: The Essential Collection book, 2021
- Edward Van Halen By Ross Halfin, 2021
- Randy Rhoads by Ross Halfin, 2021
- Listen to Whitford by Ross Halfin, 2021
- The Black Crowes by Ross Halfin, 2022
- WASP by Ross Halfin, 2022
- The Collection: Slash, 2022
- Bon Jovi by Ross Halfin, 2023
- Pronounced: A Photographic History Of Lynyrd Skynyrd, 2023
- Queensrÿche by Ross Halfin, 2024
- Velvet Revolver by Ross Halfin, 2024
