= Derek Riggs =

British artist

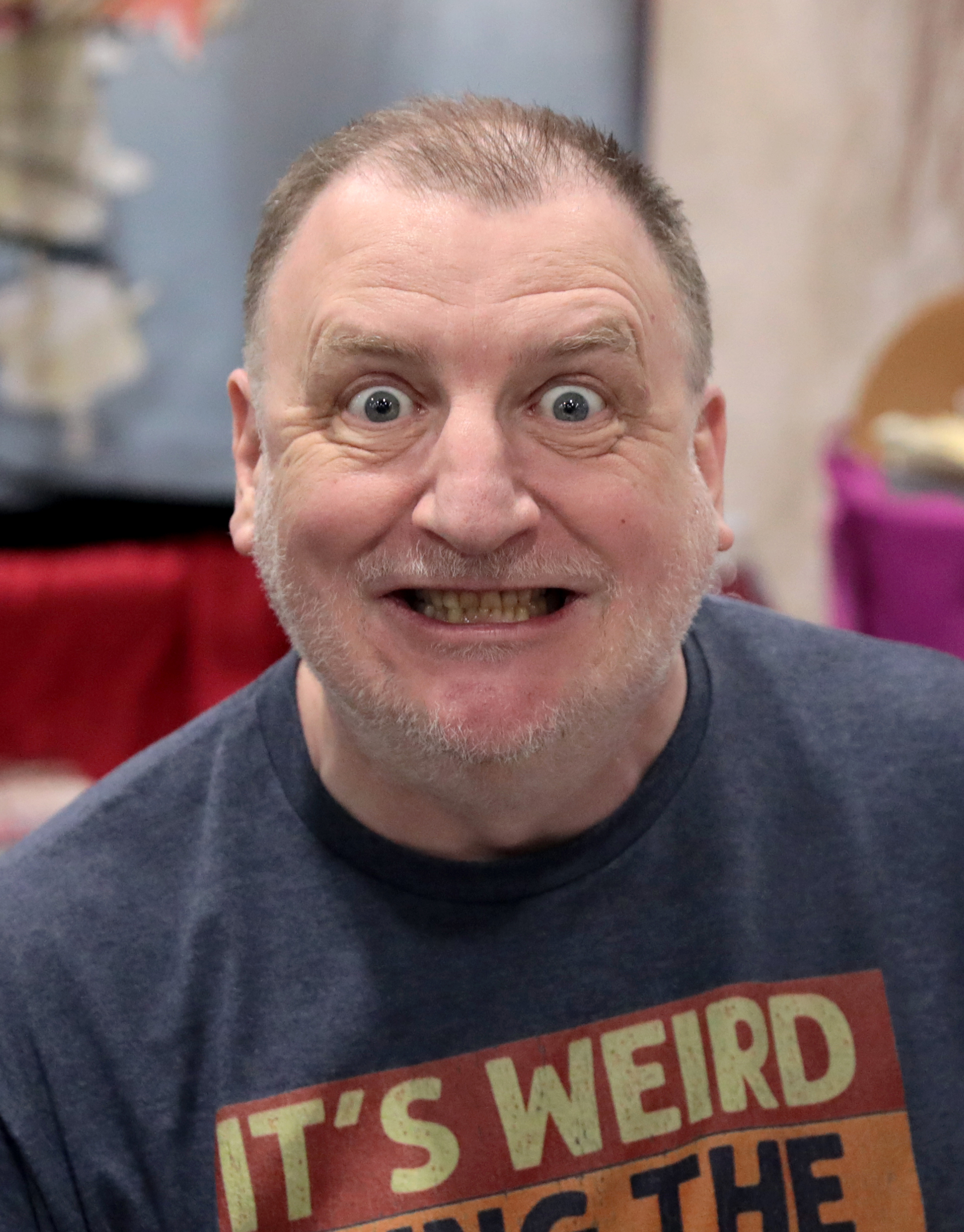
- Riggs at the 2022 Phoenix Fan Fusion
- Born: 13 February 1958 (age 68); Portsmouth, England
- Known for: Painting, drawing, graphics
- Notable work: Iron Maiden album covers
- Website: derekriggs.com

Derek Riggs (born 13 February 1958) is a contemporary British artist best known for creating the band Iron Maiden's mascot, "Eddie".

== Career ==
Born in Portsmouth, England, Riggs is a self-taught artist, both in his traditional painting and in his digital work. He began drawing and painting as early as he can remember. He also attended art school, but he was expelled after complaining about the course. Riggs' most famous achievement is his work with Iron Maiden and his creation of Eddie, the band's mascot and subject of their album and single covers. Riggs' first picture of Eddie was originally entitled "Electric Matthew Says Hello," and was actually painted for a possible punk cover. Iron Maiden's management came across it while looking through Riggs' portfolio, and asked him to add hair to the figure to make it look less punk-like. The resulting picture was used for the debut album, Iron Maiden, released in 1980, and Riggs went on to work with Iron Maiden throughout the 1980s and into the '90s, creating many of the band's famous album covers. In 1992, however, the band decided to accept contributions from other artists for their next album, Fear of the Dark, resulting in much less input from Riggs in recent years.

For a long time, Riggs did his paintings with acrylics and alkyd, which is a fast-drying oil-based paint. However, after realizing the chemicals were affecting his health, he switched to digital painting in the early 1990s. His choice of software include Bryce, Strata Studio Pro, and Photoshop.

Riggs has also designed the cover of World's Only Female Tribute to Iron Maiden, the self-titled debut album by the all-female tribute band, the Iron Maidens, a piece which was inspired by the Killers album, featuring a similar "Kinky Sex Shop" which featured in the Iron Maiden artwork.

He has also worked with Iron Maiden lead vocalist Bruce Dickinson for his album Accident of Birth, Stratovarius for their album Infinite, Gamma Ray for their Power Plant album, Artension on their 2004 album Future World, Gillman on their 2003 album Cuauhtemoc, and with many other bands and companies most of which are featured on his website.

Riggs currently resides in Riverside County, California, US. He has seasonal affective disorder.

== Tribute ==
As a fan of Iron Maiden, game designer Tim Schafer named the main character of 2009's video game Brütal Legend Eddie Riggs, which is a combination of Eddie The Head and Derek Riggs.

In 2021 Riggs was inducted into The Metal Hall of Fame.
