= Society of Ticket Agents and Retailers =

The Society of Ticket Agents and Retailers (STAR) is the self-regulatory body for ticket agents and retailers involved in the entertainment industry in the United Kingdom. STAR includes ticket agencies, venues, box offices, and members in connected industries such as travel.

== Code of practice ==
The code of practice covers all aspects of ticket retailing however it can be summarised in five main tenets:

- Provide clear pricing information for tickets in line with the requirements of the STAR Code.
- Handle bookings politely and courteously, giving the highest standards of professional service.
- Refund at least the face value of the ticket if an event is cancelled and the event organiser enables and authorises refunds.
- Highlight any terms and conditions, including transferability, cancellation and viewing restrictions.
- To provide an Alternative Dispute Resolution service for customers who have bought from STAR members.

== The STAR Administration ==
The administration of STAR is operated by a Council, which is elected by STAR members, and led by a Chairperson. Day-to-day operations are managed and carried out by STAR’s Chief Executive and External Relations professionals, who ensure the operation of the Code of Practice, handle all dispute resolution inquiries as well as provide information and advice around best practices for safe ticket buying. STAR is funded by annual contributions from its membership.

== Breach of the Code of Practice ==
If a member breaches the Code of Practice, a sub-committee examines the breach and disciplines the member if necessary and depending on the seriousness of the infringement. The most serious cases could lead to expulsion from the STAR membership.

The sub-committee includes members of the STAR Council, independent professionals and the Chair. Anyone with a business interest in the case at hand is not eligible to vote on anything related to that case.

== Alternative Dispute Resolution ==
The Society of Ticket Agents and Retailers (STAR) works to help resolve disputes between its members and ticket buyers and is approved by Government under the Alternative Dispute Resolution for Consumer Disputes (Competent Authorities and Information) Regulations 2015. The competent authority for this approval and that audits STAR’s ADR service is the Chartered Trading Standards Institute. ADR is available for customers who have an unresolved problem following their purchase from a STAR member.

A dispute resolution request can be submitted by either a customer or by a STAR member. Conciliation then takes place through the STAR office in an effort to reach a satisfactory resolution.

== OFT report ==
In June 2004 the Office of Fair Trading announced it would be carrying out a fact-finding study into ticket agents for entertainment and sporting events in the UK. The report was published in January 2005 and whilst it concluded that "most consumers were happy with their last ticket purchase" it did recommend that "the Society of Ticket Agents and Retailers produce model terms for its members to use in their consumer contacts". STAR subsequently published model terms in July 2009.

== Full Members of S.T.A.R. ==
- ACC Liverpool
- Adelphi Theatre
- AKA
- Albemarle of London Ltd
- Aldwych Theatre
- The Alexandra, Birmingham (ATG)
- Almeida Theatre
- alt-tickets (DHP Family Ltd)
- The Ambassadors Theatre
- Apollo Theatre
- Apollo Victoria Theatre
- Arena Birmingham
- Arts Club Liverpool
- ATG Entertainment
- Audience View
- AXS
- Aylesbury Waterside Theatre
- Beautiful Tickets
- Beck Theatre
- Best of Theatre (London Box Office)
- Big Green Coach Planet Festival
- Booking Protect Ltd
- Box Office
- Bridge Theatre
- Brighton Centre
- Bristol Hippodrome
- Bristol Old Vic
- Cambridge Theatre
- Cameron Mackintosh Limited
- Cardiff International Arena
- CheapTheatreTickets.com
- Chichester Festival Theatre
- Churchill Theatre
- Covent Garden Box Office
- Criterion Theatre
- Delfont Mackintosh Theatres
- DICE
- Dominion Theatre
- Donmar Warehouse
- Duchess Theatre
- Duke of York's Theatre
- Edinburgh Festival Fringe Society
- Edinburgh Playhouse
- Encore Tickets Ltd
- English National Opera
- Eventim UK
- Family Tickets Ltd
- Fever
- Fortune Theatre
- fromtheboxoffice.com
- G Live
- Garrick Theatre
- Gielgud Theatre
- Gigantic Tickets Limited
- Gigs and Tours
- Grand Opera House, York
- Grand Theatre, Leeds
- Group Line (part of ATG)
- Harold Pinter Theatre
- His Majesty's Theatre, London
- HQ Theatres Ltd
- Hyde Park Picture House
- JM Marketing Limited
- Kaboodle Solutions Ltd
- Kilimanjaro Live
- King's Theatre, Glasgow
- KX Tickets
- Leas Cliff Hall
- Leeds City Varieties
- Leicester Square Box Office
- Line Up
- Live Nation Entertainment
- Liverpool Empire Theatre
- London Box Office (Best of Theatre)
- London Coliseum
- London Palladium
- London Theatre
- London Theatre Direct
- lovetheatre.com (part of The Ticket Machine Group)
- LW Entertainment
- Lyceum Theatre, London
- Lyceum Theatre, Crewe
- Lyric Theatre (Hammersmith)
- Lyric Theatre, London
- Mamma Mia! The Party
- Manchester Opera House
- M&S Bank Arena
- Merlinsoft Ltd
- Milton Keynes Theatre
- Motorpoint Arena Nottingham
- Motorsport Tickets
- Music Plus Sport Limited
- National Arenas Association
- New London Theatre
- New Theatre Oxford (ATG)
- New Theatre Royal Lincoln
- New Victoria Theatre (ATG)
- New Wimbledon Theatre (ATG)
- Nimax Theatres
- Noel Coward Theatre
- Novello Theatre
- Nuffield Southampton Theatres
- O2 Academy Birmingham
- O2 Academy Leicester
- O2 Academy Bristol
- O2 Academy Glasgow
- O2 Academy Islington
- O2 Academy Liverpool
- O2 Academy Newcastle
- O2 Academy Oxford
- O2 Academy Sheffield
- O2 Academy Leeds
- O2 Academy Bournemouth
- O2 Academy Brixton
- O2 Apollo Manchester
- O2 Forum Kentish Town
- O2 Guildhall Southampton
- O2 Institute Birmingham
- O2 Ritz Manchester
- O2 Shepherds Bush Empire
- O2 Victoria Warehouse Manchester
- Official London Theatre
- Opera North
- Orchard Theatre, Dartford
- Oxford Playhouse
- OVO Arena Wembley
- OVO Hydro
- Palace Theatre, Manchester
- Phoenix Theatre, London
- Piccadilly Theatre
- Playhouse Theatre
- Prince Edward Theatre
- Prince of Wales Theatre
- Princess Theatre
- Quaytickets
- Queen's Theatre, Hornchurch
- Red61
- Regent Theatre, Stoke-on-Trent
- Resorts World Arena
- Richmond Theatre (London)
- Royal Albert Hall
- Royal Edinburgh Military Tattoo
- Royal National Theatre
- Royal Opera House
- Royal Shakespeare Company
- Sadler's Wells Theatre
- Santa Pod Raceway
- Savoy Theatre
- Scottish Exhibition and Conference Centre
- SeatGeek
- Seat Plan
- See Tickets
- Shaftesbury Theatre
- Sheffield Arena
- Sheffield City Hall
- Shows in London
- SIV
- SJM Concerts Ltd
- Society of London Theatre
- Sound Travel Group Ltd
- Southend Theatres
- Spektrix Ltd
- Squire Patton Boggs UK LLP
- St Martin's Theatre
- Stephen Joseph Theatre
- Stockton Globe
- Sunderland Empire
- Tessitura Network
- The Football Association
- The Lowry
- The Old Vic
- The Rugby Football Union
- The Ticket Factory
- The Ticket Store
- Theatre Royal, Brighton
- Theatre Royal, Drury Lane
- Theatre Royal, Glasgow
- Theatrebookings.com (part of Leicester Square Box Office)
- Theatre Tickets Direct Ltd (see also www.uktheatretickets.co.uk)
- Theatreland Ltd
- theatremonkey.com
- theatretickets.london
- Ticket Quarter
- Ticket Text Limited
- TicketCo UK Ltd
- Ticketek UK Ltd
- Ticketing Business Forum
- Ticketing Professionals Conference
- Ticketline
- Ticketmaster Sport
- Ticketmaster UK Ltd
- TicketPlan Limited
- Tickets Scotland
- TicketSource
- Ticketswap UK Ltd
- TicketWeb (UK) Ltd
- Tix Ticketing
- Tixel UK Ltd
- Tixtrack
- TKTS
- TodayTix Ltd
- Tungate Group
- Twickenham Stadium
- Twickets
- TYG Limited
- UK Theatre
- Universe
- Vaudeville Theatre
- Victoria Hall, Stoke-on-Trent
- Victoria Palace Theatre
- Vivaticket Ltd
- Walt Disney Theatrical UK Ltd
- Watford Palace Theatre
- WeGotTickets
- Wembley Stadium
- White Rock Theatre
- www.uktheatretickets.co.uk (see also Theatre Tickets Direct)
- Wycombe Swan
- Wyndham's Theatre
- Wyvern Theatre and Swindon Arts Centre
- York Theatre Royal

== Ticket Fraud Awareness ==
STAR has collaborated with Action Fraud, the National Fraud and Cyber Crime Reporting Centre (part of the City of London Police) to raise awareness around ticket fraud and provide best practices for customers to buy event tickets safely and with confidence.

The most recent campaign was carried out in April 2022, encouraging consumers to purchase their tickets from STAR members to ensure they are buying from a legitimate source.

STAR is actively promoting safe ticket buying and provides advice on its website to prevent consumers from becoming victims of ticket fraud.

Additionally, an independent review of consumer protection measures in ticketing was published by the UK Government in May 2016. This review took place as a requirement of the Consumer Rights Act 2015 and was conducted by Michael Waterson, an economics professor at Warwick University.
