= The Ticket Factory =

Primary ticket sales and distribution company in the United Kingdom

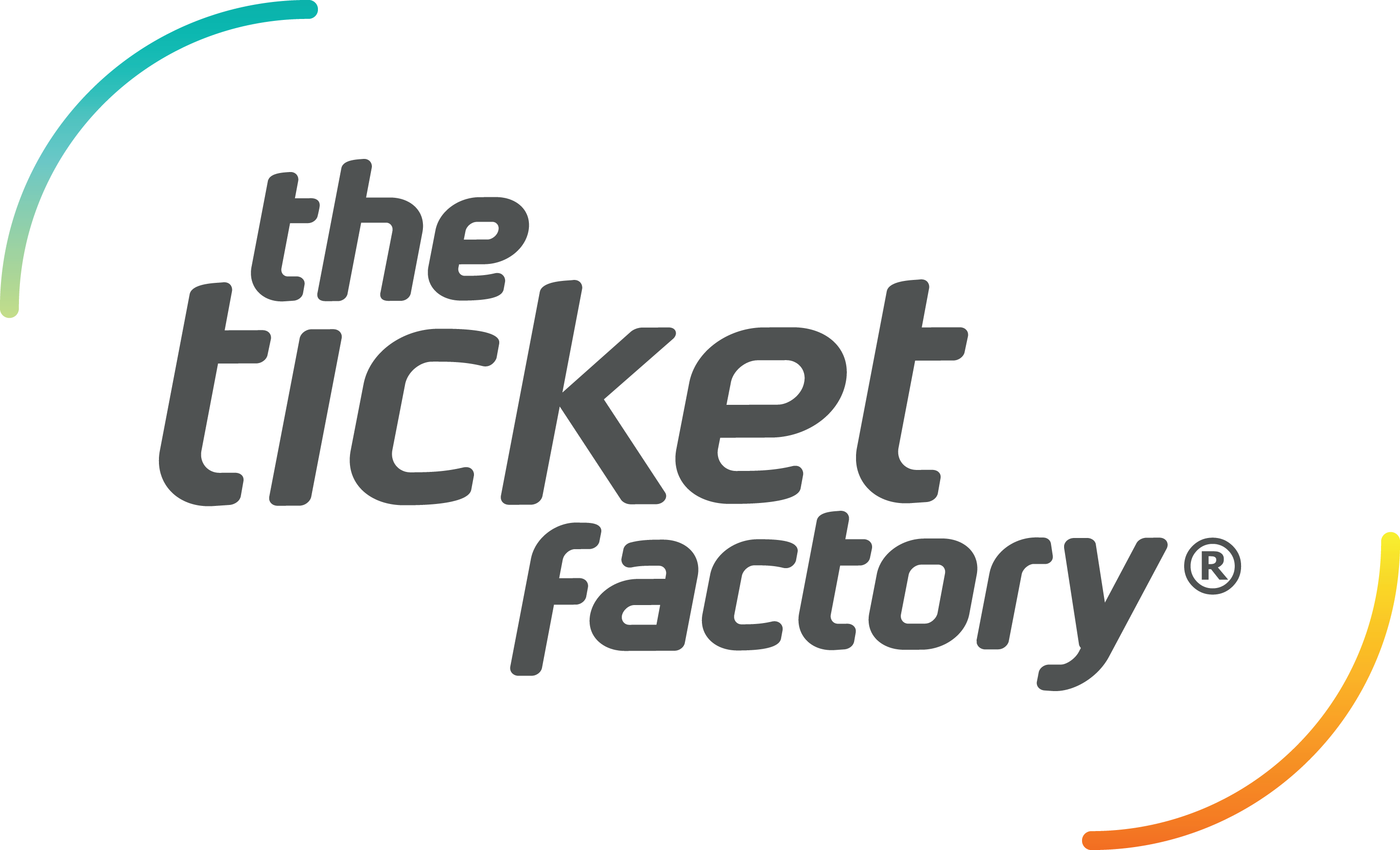
- Trade name: The Ticket Factory
- Industry: Live Entertainment
- Founded: 2007
- Headquarters: Birmingham, England
- Area served: Live Entertainment and Ticketing Systems
- Key people: Noel Edwards
- Products: Ticketing technology, Ticket Sales, Ticketing Services, Distribution of event tickets and information
- Owner: NEC Group
- Parent: The National Exhibition Centre Ltd
- Website: www.theticketfactory.com

The Ticket Factory, previously known as the NEC Box Office, is a primary ticket sales and distribution company based in the United Kingdom. The Ticket Factory was launched in 2007 and is a trading division of The National Exhibition Centre Ltd. The Ticket Factory head office and contact centre is based at the National Exhibition Centre, Birmingham.

The Ticket Factory sells and distributes tickets across the UK for music concerts, sporting events, festivals, comedy shows, theatre and exhibitions. The Ticket Factory is the box office for Birmingham-based venues; bp pulse LIVE, the Utilita Arena Birmingham and National Exhibition Centre, as well as being the primary agent for Royal Horticultural Society and British Athletics. The Ticket Factory is a member of the Society of Ticket Agents and Retailers (STAR).

The Ticket Factory became exclusive ticket agent for the Society of London Theatre’s (SOLT) ‘Get Into London Theatre’ 2014 campaign.

In 2012, Barclaycard partnered with The Ticket Factory to become their official payment partner, which evolved into the Barclaycard Unwind brand and Fee Free Friday.

In 2014, The Ticket Factory's parent company, The National Exhibition Centre Ltd. announced a partnership with Virgin Trains West Coast.

In 2020, The Ticket Factory worked with Acorns Children's Hospice on the first collaboration with welfare.

In 2024, The Ticket Factory was acquired by AXS, a global ticketing company to manage ticketing for the two Birmingham arenas.

== History ==
- 1970 NEC Box Office opens
- 1998 First online ticket sales launched
- 2006 First tickets scanned for admission to Whitesnake concert at the National Indoor Arena
- 2007 Re-launched as The Ticket Factory
- 2012 Barclaycard becomes official payment partner
- 2013 Royal Horticultural Society re-appoints The Ticket Factory as national box office
- 2014 Announces partnership with Virgin Trains West Coast
- 2016 Becomes the first ticket agent to allow deaf and disabled customers to purchase tickets online through a partnership with the Access Card
- 2017 Launches the first ever ticketing apprenticeship
- 2019 Signs a new ticketing partnership with Royal Horticultural Society and becomes official ticketing supplier to British Athletics
- 2024 Sold to AXS

== Venues ==
The Ticket Factory is the official box office for two Birmingham based venues; Resorts World Arena and Utilita Arena Birmingham, both are a trading division of The National Exhibition Centre Ltd.

=== Utilita Arena Birmingham ===
Utilita Arena Birmingham, formerly known as the Barclaycard Arena and the National Indoor Arena is one of the busiest, large scale indoor sporting and entertainment venues in Europe. Since opening in 1991, it has welcomed visitors to over 30 sports and an extensive variety of entertainment and music. The Ticket Factory has ticketed events from Oasis, Coldplay, Cliff Richard and Kings of Leon, to Disney on Ice and Cirque du Soleil.

=== Resorts World Arena ===
Resorts World Arena, formerly known as the Genting Arena and the LG Arena is part of the National Exhibition Centre complex. The 16,000 capacity Resorts World Arena was the largest multi-purpose arena in the UK when opening in 1980 as The NEC Arena and is still a major venue for many large, international touring acts. The Ticket Factory is the official box office for the Resorts World Arena.

== See also ==
- The Society of Ticket Agents and Retailers
- Primary ticket outlet
