= Eventim UK =

British events and ticket agent

Eventim UK Ltd
- Industry: Live Entertainment
- Founded: 2009
- Headquarters: London, United Kingdom
- Services: Ticketing technology, Ticket Sales, Ticketing Services, Marketing, Distribution of event tickets and information
- Number of employees: 11–25
- Parent: CTS Eventim AG & Co. KGaA
- Website: www.eventim.co.uk

Eventim UK is an events and ticket agent, based in London, England. The company is a wholly owned subsidiary of Europe's largest ticket retailer, CTS Eventim AG & Co. KGaA.

Eventim has been a member of STAR (The Society Of Ticket Agents And Retailers) – the UK self-regulatory body for the entertainment and ticketing industry – since June 2009.

Eventim entered the market in 2009 following an agreement between CTS Eventim and Live Nation Entertainment. By the end of 2009 the company was selling tickets for a number of events, including West End shows and The Isle of Wight Festival.

Eventim partners with SMG Europe in the UK to provide ticketing solutions for 3 major UK arenas, the partnership started in 2012.

In the summer of 2013, Eventim UK announced it was to become the name sponsor of the Hammersmith Apollo in partnership with co-owners AEG Live. The venue was renamed the Eventim Apollo ahead of the first event after its refurbishment on 7 September 2013.

== History ==
CTS Eventim launched Eventim UK Ltd. and it was incorporated in January 2009. At the time of their launch, the ticketing brand was already responsible for selling tickets for the Isle of Wight Festival and it was announced that the company had arranged to take over Live Nation's UK ticketing operations within the first month of operation. The change of ticketing operations for Live Nation included the installation of CTS ticketing hardware at various UK stadiums and theatres. This included Manchester Apollo, Motorpoint Arena Cardiff and Southampton Guildhall, all of which spent late 2009 and January 2010 testing the CTS equipment at Live Nation venues.

At the time of Eventim UK's foundation, a merger between Live Nation and Ticketmaster was given the green light by the Competition Commission in the UK. On 5 April 2010, Eventim UK's parent company CTS Eventim, filed an arbitration complaint over Live Nation and Ticketmaster's merger. This was following the termination of the contract by Live Nation. This was following the switch by Live Nation's ticketing solution from Ticketmaster to Eventim in February 2010.

The complaint came after 3 years of partnership between CTS Eventim and Live Nation, who originally announced a partnership in 2007. Up until that point, Live Nation had worked closely with Ticketmaster for their ticketing solutions. 2010 saw Live Nation begin to work closely with Ticketmaster in the UK following their merger. Live Nation and Ticketmaster had previously attempted to merge in 2009, but the move was blocked. The merger was said to be breaching various terms of the CTS Eventim and Live Nation partnership contract, which had been in place since 2007.

In June 2013, the arbitration between CTS Eventim and Live Nation was settled, over 3 years after it was initially filed. It was ruled that Live Nation were not liable for any costs to CTS Eventim.

Following the arbitration complaint from CTS Eventim, it was announced in late 2011 that a silent deal between CTS Eventim and SMG Europe had been agreed. The deal was to last an initial 5 years and would be implemented at the start of 2013. The deal would see a number of UK based arenas begin to use Eventim's ticketing systems.

=== Venues ===
AEG Live and CTS Eventim entered into a deal in June 2012 to buy the Hammersmith Apollo from HMV. Following the acquisition, Eventim UK would play a major role in the ticketing of the venue, with the firms saying in a joint statement, "The Hammersmith Apollo will provide a complementary fit to both AEG and CTS's existing UK operations".

At the beginning of 2013 a partnership between Eventim and SMG Europe was officially announced. At the time of the deal, SMG Europe were the UK's largest arena operator. The deal meant Eventim would be responsible for ticketing at five SMG venues including the newly constructed First Direct Arena, the Manchester Arena, Metro Radio Arena, Playhouse Whitley Bay and Mill Volvo Tyne Theatre.

It was announced in November 2014 that Eventim will take over ticketing operations for East London venue Troxy.

=== Eventim Apollo ===
Eventim UK's parent company CTS Eventim jointly acquired the Hammersmith Apollo with AEG live in 2012. The parties purchased the venue under jointly owned new company Stage C Limited. It was subsequently announced that Eventim UK would manage the ticketing operations for the venue.

Following the acquisition of the Apollo from HMV, Stage C Limited managed a £5 million renovation of the Grade II* Listed building. The renovations began in the summer of 2013 and the venue reopened as the Eventim Apollo on 7 September with a concert from US popstar Selena Gomez.

Since the rebranding of the venue Kate Bush announced a run of 22 live dates, her first in over 30 years, which sold out in just 15 minutes.

=== FanSale ===
Eventim UK launched FanSale, a secondary ticketing site in late 2017. Tickets can only be resold at the original cost and are validated against the ticketing system in order to reduce ticket touting and the advertisement of fake tickets.

== Awards ==
=== Music Week Awards 2018 ===
Eventim UK was awarded the 'Best Ticketing Company' award in April 2018 at the annual Music Week awards
