= See Tickets =

International ticketing services company

See Group Ltd
- Trade name: See Tickets
- Formerly: Way Ahead Records; Way Ahead Group
- Type: Private
- Industry: Live entertainment Ticketing systems Ticket retail and distribution
- Predecessors: Vivendi Ticketing
- Headquarters: Nottingham, England, UK
- Area served: Worldwide
- Key people: Rob Wilmshurst (CEO)
- Products: Live event tickets Ticket technology
- Parent: The Really Useful Group (2004–2011); Bridgepoint Capital (2004–2011); Vivendi (2011–2024); CTS Eventim (2024–present)
- Subsidiaries: See Tickets USA; Digitick; Paylogic; Starticket
- Website: www.seetickets.com, www.seetickets.us

See Tickets is an international ticketing services company based in Nottingham, England. It was acquired by CTS Eventim in June 2024.

The firm operates throughout Europe and North America under the See Tickets brand, with over 15 offices in cities including; London, Los Angeles, New York, Nashville, Paris, Marseille, Madrid, Berlin, Amsterdam, Groningen, Antwerp, Lisbon and Zurich.

== Background ==
The business started as Way Ahead Records in the 1980s, a Nottingham-based record shop which began selling concert tickets in the 1980s. It began trading as See Tickets in 2004 following an acquisition by The Really Useful Group and Bridgepoint Capital.

Since 2011, See has been a wholly owned subsidiary of Vivendi SA, a Paris-based international integrated media and content group, employing more than 50,000 staff globally with revenues in excess of €29 billion in 2010.(2)

In December 2014, See opened its first US office in Los Angeles, California. See expanded its US presence in June 2016, after its parent company Vivendi acquired ticket agency Flavorus from SFX Entertainment for $4 million, now rebranded as See Tickets.(3) In November 2019 a second office opened in the US in Nashville, Tennessee.

In April 2018, See again expanded by acquiring LiveStyle's Netherlands-based online ticketing service, Paylogic. As part of the deal, See Tickets US tickets LiveStyle's US-based events such as; Electric Zoo, Life in Color, Sunset Music Festival, and Spring Awakening.

Later in 2019, Paylogic also rebranded as See Tickets. The following year, it further expanded their European presence by acquiring Swiss-based Starticket from the TX Group, which sells over 5 million tickets annually.

In June 2024, it was announced that See Tickets was one of the assets of Vivendi's ticketing and festival division acquired by CTS Eventim.

== Services ==
Today, See Tickets retails and distributes tickets for music, festival, theatre, sport, comedy, exhibition and lifestyle events working with more than 5,000 clients globally. Notably, the business sold all 150,000 tickets for the 2015 Glastonbury Festival in 29 minutes.

See Tickets is a full service ticket agency and services to clients include custom UX and UI development, marketing, customer care, access control and all aspects of ticketing and account management.

See Tickets' global client list includes well known event promoters, festivals and venues such as: Universal Music Group, Glastonbury Festival, S.J.M. Concerts, Houses of Parliament, Rock in Rio Lisboa, Professional Darts Corporation, The Queen Mary, Society of London Theatre, Louis Vuitton, Tomorrowland, Electric Zoo, and Boardmasters Festival.

In 2017, See Tickets launched "Fan to Fan", an ethical secondary ticket re-sale platform that allowed customers to only sell their tickets online via See at face value or less. See Tickets was the first ticket agency to launch its own ethical ticketing platform. In 2019, See Tickets reported that ethical ticket sales through Fan to Fan were up 50% vs the same time in 2018.

Again in 2017, See also launched "Fan Share" a peer to peer marketing system to allow customers to earn rewards from event organisers for assisting with the sale of tickets on-line.

2019 saw See Tickets launch their new digital ticket service to combat the resale of tickets at an inflated price on the secondary market, which was used for new tours from Declan McKenna and Bombay Bicycle Club. The digital ticket features a dynamically refreshing barcode which is uniquely tied to a customer's user account, mobile device and See Tickets app.

In 2020, See Tickets launched a contactless access control system as a way to provide clients with a safe way to manage event entry using a standalone scanning point.

== See also ==
- The Society of Ticket Agents and Retailers
- Primary ticket outlet
