= Auter =

Auter may refer to:

- Auter (outerwear brand)
- Auter (river), a river in Germany, tributary of the Leine
- misspelling of Auteur
