= Super Bowl LIV halftime show =

Halftime show of the 2020 Super Bowl

- Part of: Super Bowl LIV
- Date: February 2, 2020
- Location: Miami Gardens, Florida, U.S.
- Venue: Hard Rock Stadium
- Headliner: Jennifer Lopez; Shakira
- Special guests: Bad Bunny; J Balvin; Emme Muñiz
- Sponsor: Pepsi
- Director: Hamish Hamilton
- Producers: Ricky Kirshner; NFL Network; Jay-Z; Roc Nation

Super Bowl halftime show chronology
LIII (2019)	LIV (2020)	LV (2021)

The Super Bowl LIV halftime show, officially known as the Pepsi Super Bowl LIV Halftime Show, took place on February 2, 2020, at Hard Rock Stadium in Miami Gardens, Florida, as part of Super Bowl LIV. It was televised in the U.S. by Fox. It was co-headlined by Jennifer Lopez and Shakira, and included guest appearances by Bad Bunny, J Balvin, and Lopez's daughter Emme Muñiz.

The halftime show received critical acclaim including four Primetime Emmy nominations, winning one. It was also received many other awards, winning "Best Live Performance" at the 2021 Premios Nuestra Tierra credited to Shakira.

== Background ==
In August 2019, it was announced Jay-Z's company Roc Nation had entered a deal with the NFL for him and his company to produce the halftime show in the wake of his and others' backlash against the previous year's musical acts Maroon 5 and Travis Scott seen as strikebreakers to the politics around Colin Kaepernick.

On September 26, 2019, the selection of Shakira and Jennifer Lopez to headline the show was announced; according to reports, the selection was intended to reflect the Latin culture of the host city Miami. This was the third time Latin music artists headlined the Super Bowl halftime show; Gloria Estefan headlined both the Super Bowl XXVI halftime show in 1992 and the Super Bowl XXXIII halftime show in 1999. For months, rumors Lopez might be chosen as a halftime show act had circulated; she had expressed her interest in doing so in July 2019. Jon Pareles of the New York Times also wrote in his review of the show that booking the two "steered the halftime show away from black-and-white racial tensions and toward the joys of motion and seduction." Multiple big acts have paired before: Aerosmith and NSYNC in 2001 and Coldplay, Beyoncé, and Bruno Mars in 2016.

== Development ==
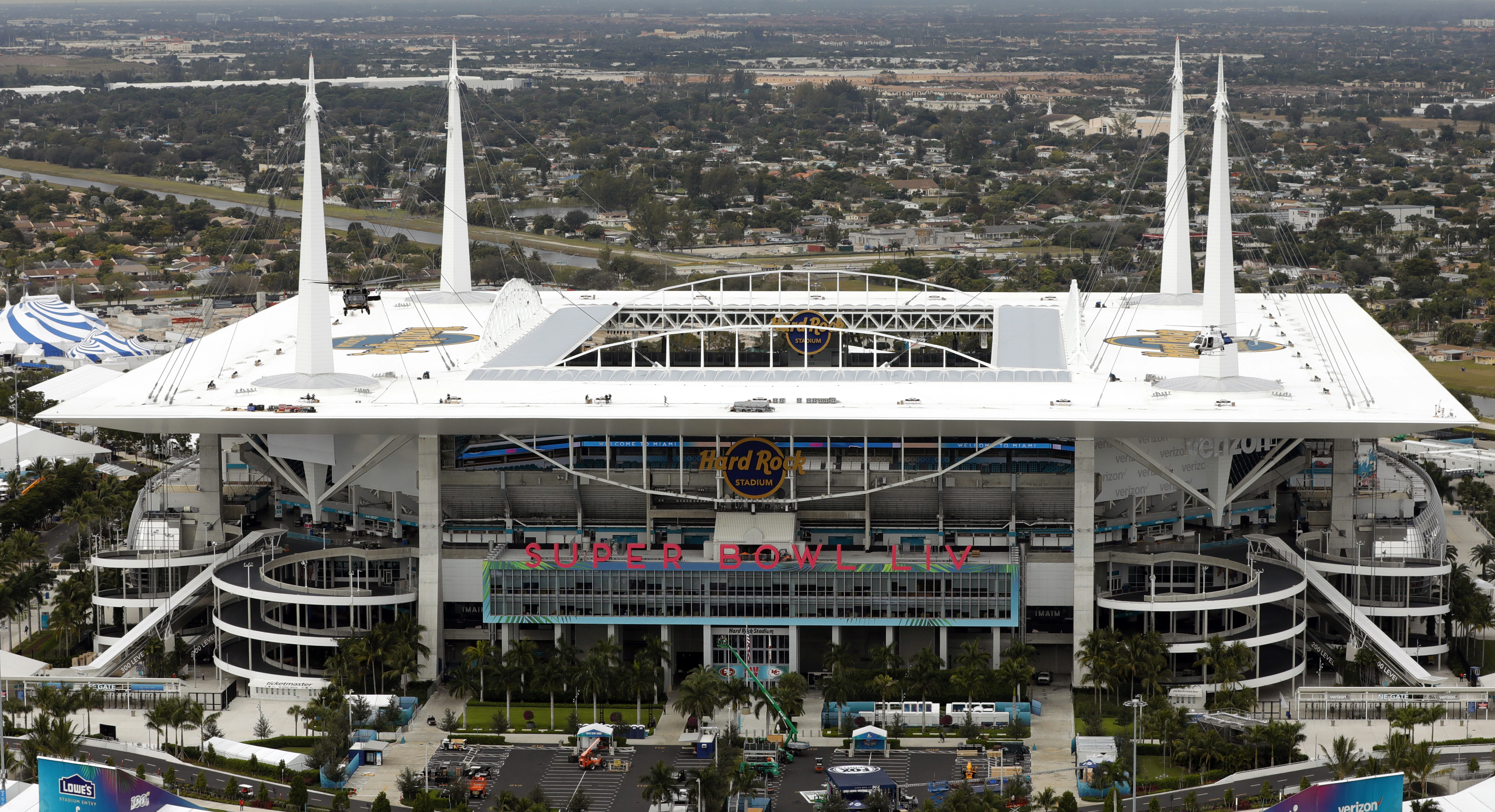
Hard Rock Stadium

Roc Nation served as producers and creative directors of the show; their producers included Dan Parise. Ricky Kirshner served as the show's executive producer and Hamish Hamilton served as director.

Adam Blackstone, the musical director of the show noted that the show intends to cement what both women represent. Calling Shakira a "global phenomenon" he says he had to think about the singer's global fan base. For Jennifer, he says the intentions were to represent her as an icon in acting, music, and dance. His vision and mission were to make the two acts feel cohesive and a part of the same show.

Tabitha and Napoleon D'umo served as the creative directors and choreographers for Lopez's half of the show, which included approximately 130 dancers. which was choreographed by Tabitha D'umo and Parris Goebel. Jaquel Knight, Nadine Eliya, and Maite Marcos were the creative directors and choreographers of Shakira's half. In mid-January, the producers announced they would recruit approximately 600 field team members to assist with the performance. Ultimately, 670 team field members were enlisted.

Among the equipment used for the show were 565 ROE CB5 tiles, 8 Brompton SX40 4K LED processors, 22 Brompton Tessera XD data distribution boxes using 8x optical fiber runs, 4 4K video feeds—two main and two for backup—and 8 LED techs. The pyrotechnics for the show used 5,350 pieces of product, which were launched from 32 roof locations and 16 special locations, using 80 firing modules. A FireOne control system was used. Twenty-four 30W Arctos Systems lasers were used in the show.

=== Fashion ===
Reviewer Chris Willman of Variety wrote "Costumers deserve almost as much credit as the choreographers here." Shakira's set had three costume changes; each piece was custom-made by Norwegian designer Peter Dundas. Her first was a red, cropped bustier with a cross-straps top that was paired with a removable corset and fringed skirt, each of which were covered with 123,000 Swarovski crystals in three shades of red. This was paired with crystal-accented leather cuffs and knee-high boots that were made by the designer Daniel Jacob. The boots were covered with 30,000 Swarovski crystals and took ten days to create. Shakira then made a mid-performance costume change to reveal a fringed, feathered skirt that was previously hidden under a sarong. Her final costume was an entirely new ensemble consisting of a bomber jacket covered in gold sequin embroidery and gold-and-white Swarovski crystals on a matching gold sequin crop top, which she wore with matching high-waisted hot pants and Dundas-customized Adidas Superstar sneakers.

Lopez's stylists were Rob Zangardi and Mariel Haenn, her makeup artist was Scott Barnes, and her hairstylist was Chris Appleton. Her set involved five costume changes; all of her looks and those of her dancers were custom-designed by Versace and approved by Donatella Versace: Lopez was the face of Versace's Spring 2020 campaign. Haenn noted; "Every look has to be layered one on top of the other because she never really leaves the stage". Lopez's first outfit was a Swarovski crystal-and-gold-studded, biker-inspired black leather Medusa bodysuit paired with a pink satin ball gown skirt. Her backup dancers also wore black leather biker jackets paired with pleated miniskirts trimmed with black lace. During the set she tore off her skirt to reveal black leather chaps. Lopez later took off this outfit to reveal a custom-made body-hugging silver catsuit coated in crystals and tiny mirrored panels. She next changed into a metal-mesh-and-crystal-fringed bustier with bondage-harness details, topped by a feather cape around her shoulders that depicted the U.S. flag on the outside and the Puerto Rican flag on the inside. Lopez later revealed that the Puerto Rican flag's inclusion in the show was a secret, "The flag — I didn't even show it to anybody until the last minute because I didn't want anybody telling me I couldn't do it", adding: "I just had the American flag on the outside and during rehearsals".

== Synopsis ==
External videos
- Full Super Bowl LIV halftime show. on YouTube

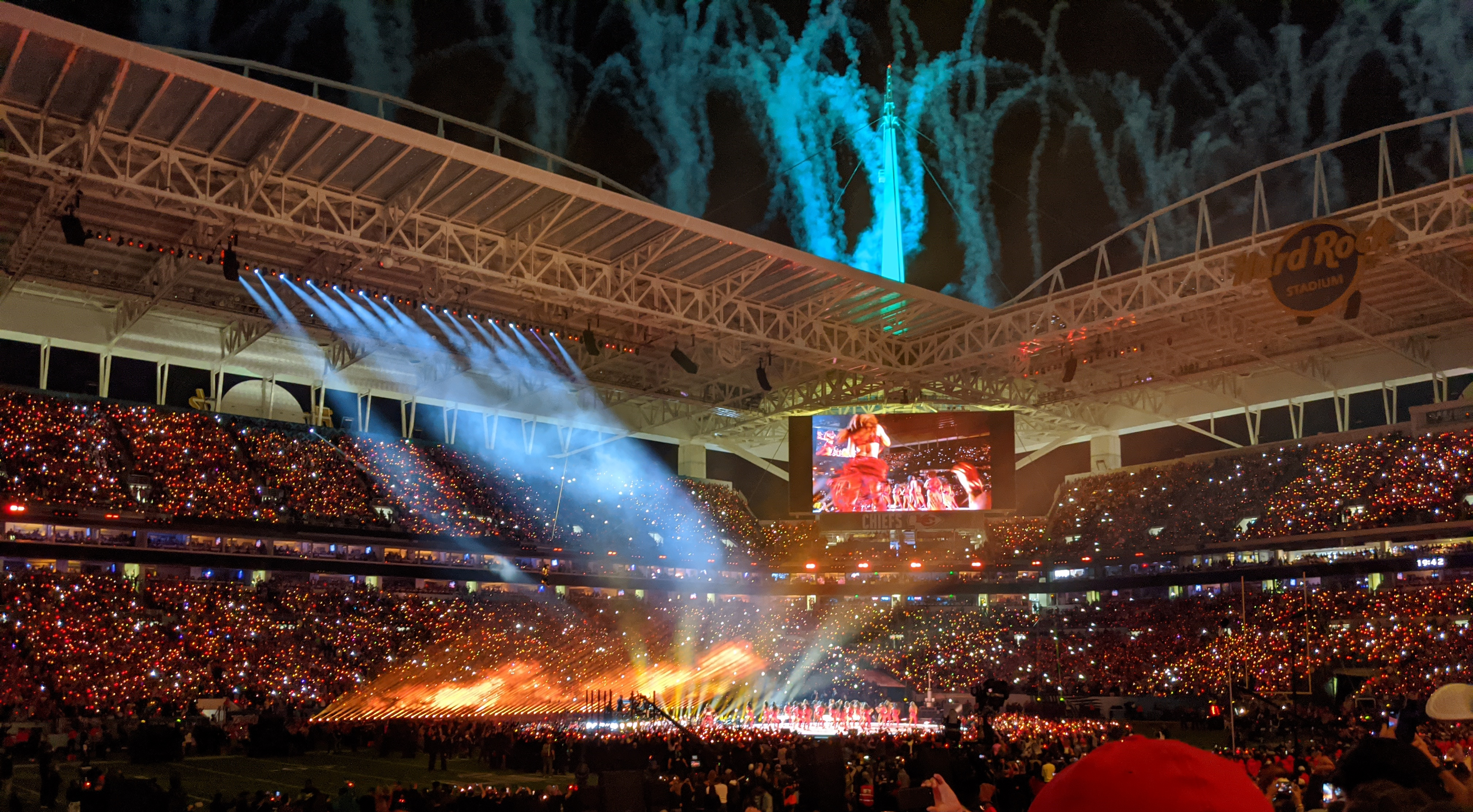
Shakira performs "Whenever, Wherever"

Shakira, standing on a platform on the stage and wearing a "tiny red sequin dress", opened the show dancing "Dare (La La La)". She started her set with a performance of "She Wolf", surrounded by a group of dancers, the segued into a performance of "Empire", during which she played an electric guitar and included elements of "Inevitable" and Led Zeppelin's "Kashmir". She then wrapped a rope around her wrists, sang part of the first verse of "Ojos Así", and then belly danced to part of "Move" by Said Mrad with added strings. This was followed by a performance of "Whenever, Wherever", after which guest artist Bad Bunny joined her on stage. Shakira and Bad Bunny performed a cover of his song "I Like It" then they sang a mash up of Shakira's "Chantaje" and Bunny's "Callaíta" together. In the final section of Shakira's set, she performed "Hips Don't Lie", during which she crowd surfed, danced mapalé, and wagged her tongue in an Arabic tradition known as zaghrouta.

Jennifer Lopez then appeared for the beginning of her set wearing a black leather bodysuit. After rising from a "skyscraper-turned-stripper pole", she opened up her performance with a one second sample of Frankie Cutlass' classic Hip Hop song "Puerto Rico" then "Jenny from the Block" then "Ain't It Funny (Murder Remix)", while backed by dancers. Following a performance of "Get Right", Lopez changed her costume for a "sparkling" catsuit and sang "Waiting for Tonight" while pole dancing; her pole-dance routine included a "tabletop move with the dancers writhing underneath". She was then joined on stage by J Balvin, who performed "Que Calor" and "Mi Gente", which were mashed up with Lopez's songs "Booty", "El Anillo" and "Love Don't Cost a Thing" as she danced above. Lopez then performed "On the Floor".

Shakira returned to play drums while Lopez's daughter Emme Muñiz appeared on stage to sing "Let's Get Loud" with an excerpt from Bruce Springsteen's "Born in the U.S.A." as Lopez was in front of an all-female choir. During this section of Lopez's set, she wore a feather cape depicting both the Puerto Rican and American flags while children on the field appeared in "cage like structures", which was interpreted as a statement on the U.S.-Mexico border crisis.

Shakira, who was now clothed in a "short golden outfit", subsequently performed "Waka Waka (This Time for Africa)" during a dance routine of champeta. Lopez then returned to the stage to perform "Aguanile" by Héctor Lavoe as a "Vegas-style salsa number" and was joined by Colombian salsa dance group Swing Latino. Both of the headlining acts ended their performance with "synchronized shimmies".

== Critical response ==
=== Reviews ===
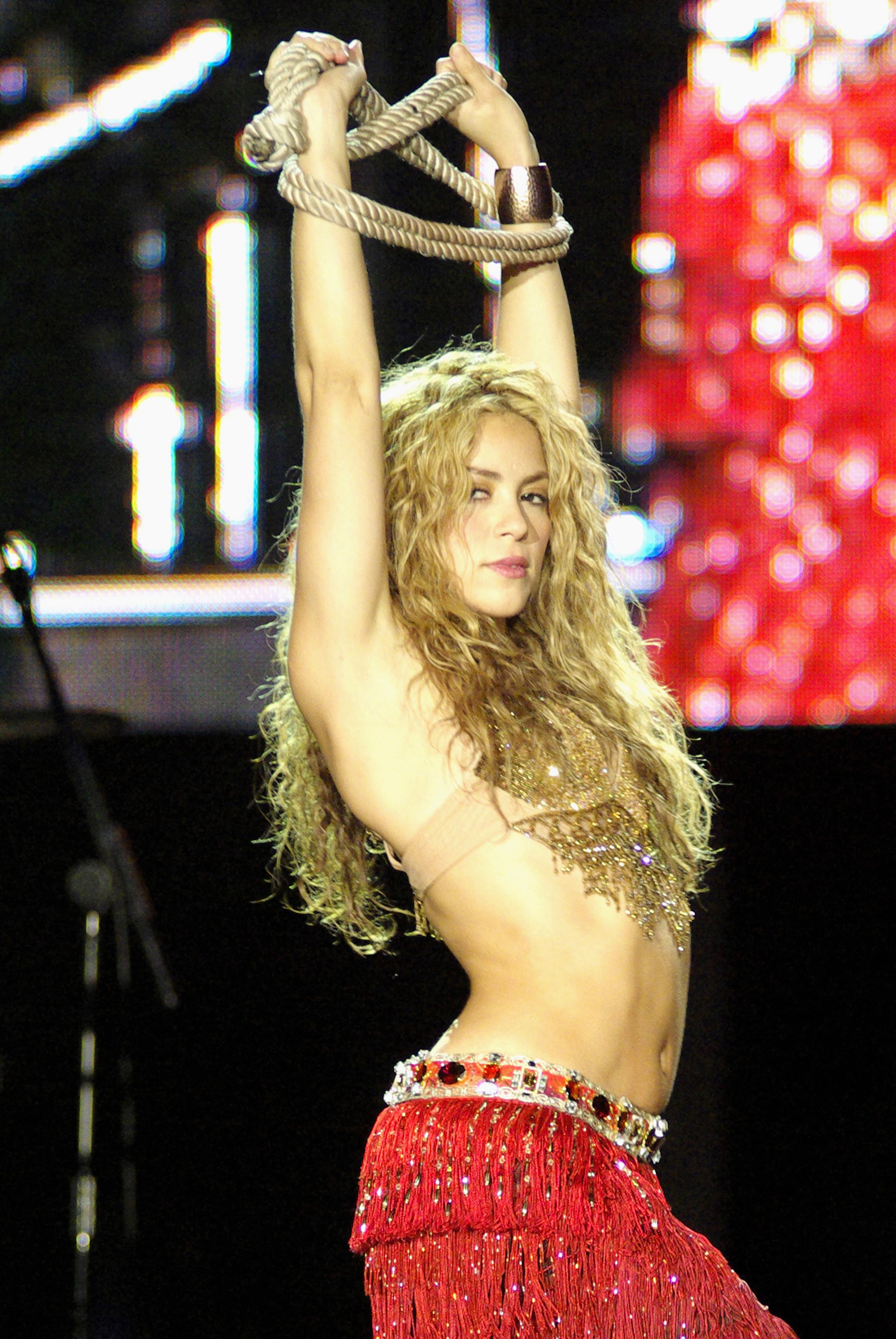
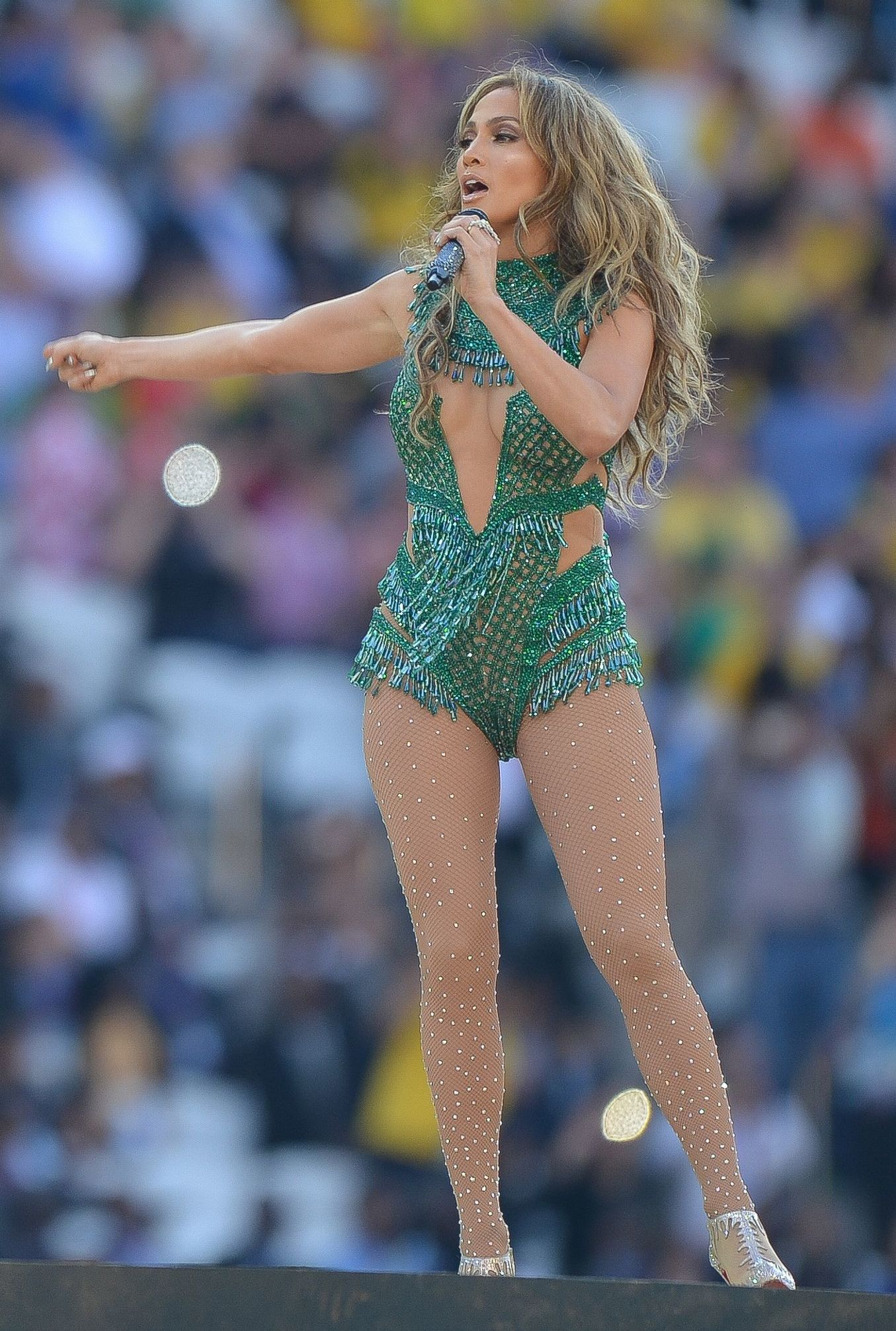
Headliners Shakira (left) and Jennifer Lopez (right) pictured in 2008 and 2014, respectively

The halftime show was critically acclaimed. Jon Pareles of The New York Times lauded the performance, calling it an improvement over the previous year's halftime. He called the show "a no-nonsense affirmation of Latin pride and cultural diversity in a political climate where immigrants and American Latinos have been widely demonized", called Shakira and Lopez "Latina superwomen, smiling pop conquistadoras backed by phalanxes of dancers", and calling the show "euphoria with a purpose". David Bauder of the Associated Press wrote Lopez and Shakira "infused the Super Bowl halftime show with an exuberance and joy that celebrated their Latina heritage". He also wrote, "Their breathless athleticism matched that of the football players waiting in the locker room" but called J Balvin's and Bad Bunny's guest appearances "superfluous". Greg Kot of the Chicago Tribune wrote, "Prince's 2007 Super Bowl performance is still king of halftime, but Shakira and J Lo were certainly the most undeniable performance since then". Bobby Olivier of NJ.com described the halftime show as "high-octane, relentless Latin pop fun", adding it was "a blazing performance that should challenge Lady Gaga and Beyoncé as some of the best halftime sets of the past decade or so".

Chuck Arnold of the New York Post described the performance as "electric". Greg Evans of Deadline Hollywood wrote, "In a high-energy mix of music, dance and sequins, Lopez and Shakira (and several teams worth of back-up dancers) delivered a spectacle-style show [that is] not without its statements". Alex Suskind of Entertainment Weekly said the performance was "a punchy, political, and flat-out electric 14-minute performance that doubled as a salute to Latin culture and celebration of both stars' careers". Patrick Ryan of USA Today hailed the performance as "one of the best Super Bowl halftime shows in memory." The Hollywood Reporter called the show the most "lively, and smile inducing" halftime show, while Rosemary Akpan, writing for The Grammys, called it "a celebration of Latin culture".

There were also criticisms. John J. Moser of The Morning Call called it the "sexiest halftime show in memory", but also said it was not the "edgiest or most contemporary" halftime show in recent years. Jeff Miers of The Buffalo News wrote, "the Super Bowl halftime show has not really been about music, per se, in a long while. The J-Lo/Shakira throwdown carried that tradition forward, emphasizing spectacle, bombast and flash over music—in this case, an only mildly Latin-flavored pop-dance hybrid". On Shakira's role in the show, Naomi Fry of The New Yorker wrote, "she looked and sounded great, moving fleetly between monster bangers". She also wrote, "Lopez's voice isn't her strongest asset, and she spent minutes at a time dancing rather than singing, but her showmanship was unparalleled", calling the pace of her performance "furious." In Vibe, Desire Thompson praised Shakira's "cultural homages" which were "the most prominent" during the show, referring to her inclusion of mapalé, champeta and zaghrouta.

The reaction was more negative particularly among conservative and Christian audiences. Leah Barkoukis of Townhall.com commented; "If it was a mix of hypersexual entertainment with a bonus political statement you were looking for in Super Bowl LIV's halftime show, then 2020's big game didn't disappoint". Evangelist Franklin Graham said the performance was "showing young girls that sexual exploitation of women is okay". Jeanne F. Mancini, president of anti-abortion rally March for Life, said the show was "[e]mbarrassing for everyone [she was] with—looking away, etc". In a USA Today op-ed, Gil Smart stated the show "should have come with a parental warning" and that "to some, the show was a joyful, Miami-infused explosion of dance and high-energy music that got you out of your seat ... To others, it looked a lot like softcore porn". Despite this criticism from some conservative outlets, some prominent Republicans from Florida, including political strategist and commentator Ana Navarro, Senators Marco Rubio and Rick Scott, and former governor Jeb Bush, praised the show. An investigation by Dallas-Fort Worth television station WFAA found viewers filed more than 1,300 complaints to the FCC over the content.

Dee Snider of Twisted Sister accused the National Football League (NFL) of neglecting heavy metal and hard rock music. However, hard rock acts have made appearances in past Super Bowl halftime shows, such as The Who, Aerosmith, The Rolling Stones, Tom Petty, and Bruce Springsteen.

=== Rankings ===
Super Bowl LIV halftime show on select critic lists
Publisher	Listicle	Rank	Ref.
NBC Sports	Ranking the 10 Best Super Bowl Halftime Show Performances in NFL History	8	
Fox Sports	Ranking the 10 Best Super Bowl Halftime Shows of All Time	3	
The Independent	Super Bowl Halftime Show: The 10 Best Performances	3	
Rolling Stone	Every Super Bowl Halftime Show, Ranked from Worst to Best	7	
Los Angeles Times	The 10 Best Latin Music Moments of 2020	2	

== Commercial reception ==
In the United States, the Super Bowl LIV halftime show attracted 103 million viewers, an increase of 4% on the previous year. The viewership was slightly higher than the game itself, which was viewed by an average of 99.9 million television viewers. Social media activity relating to the show showed a significant spike; over 1 million tweets mentioned Lopez and Shakira, a 431% increase from the previous year's 127,576 mentions of Maroon 5. Of the 1,114,545 tweets mentioning the show, 69% expressed a positive sentiment; 38% of tweets expressed joy and 8% expressed love. Shakira's name generated over 2.6 million tweets which accumulated more tweets than the Super Bowl as a whole (1.85 million) placing her at number one on trending topics. Her zaghrouta during the show resulted in a viral internet meme.

Both Lopez's and Shakira's music also experienced increased sales. According to an initial sales report by Nielsen Music, the songs performed in the show experienced a 1,013% sales increase in the U.S. on February 2, increasing to 16,000 digital downloads—up from just over 1,000 the previous day. According to Alpha Data, the spike in songs sales was 1,000% and the songs performed increased 1,374% in sales over the previous day, selling more than 17,000 copies. According to Nielsen Music, of the songs performed in the show, "Whenever, Wherever" was the bestselling, garnering 4,000 downloads, a 1,194% increase over the prior day. The next-best-selling song was "Hips Don't Lie", which garnered 2,000 downloads, an increase 1,126% over the previous day. Alpha Data also said "Whenever, Wherever" was the biggest-selling of the show's songs in sales on the day of the performance, with 4,000 downloads, a 1,349% increase over the previous day. It also found in regards to all industry-wide song sales on the day of the performance, the song was the third-best-selling song; "Hips Don't Lie" was the fourth-best selling; and "Waka Waka (This Time for Africa)" was the tenth-best-selling song. Alpha Data reported "She Wolf" had a 3,000% increase in sales on the day of the show, the greatest percentage increase of any of the songs performed. It also reported Lopez saw 6,000 in sales of her songs that were included in the show on the day of the performance. "On the Floor" sold 1,600 copies on the day of the performance.

The artists' music also experienced a spike on streaming platforms. Amazon reported Amazon Alexa requests for Lopez's music on Amazon Music rose 426% and that requests for Shakira rose 303%. Compared with the previous Sunday, streams of Lopez's tracks on Amazon Music rose 432% while streams of Shakira's tracks rose 150%. On Spotify, streams for Lopez's music rose more than 335%, and Shakira's music rose by approximately 230%. The song with the greatest increase in streams on Spotify was Shakira's "Empire", with an increase of 2,135%. Alpha Data found that "Hips Don't Lie" was the most streamed of the songs included in the show, with 1.8 million on-demand audio streams on the day of and the day following the performance. "She Wolf" saw a 500% increase in sales in the 24 hours after the show. Alpha Data reported that Lopez's "On the Floor" was streamed 830,000 within 24 hours of the show. As for overall streams Billboard reported that the song catalogs of the two performers earned 31.1 million on-demand streams (audio and video combined) on Feb 2 and 3 -- up 193% as compared to their streaming sum on Jan 31 and Feb 1 (10.6 million). Lopez's songs amassed 10.1 million streams on Feb. 2–3, up 149% versus the 4.06 million they collected on Jan 31 and Feb. 1. Shakira's songs earned 20.98 million streams on Feb 2 and 3, up 221% as compared to the 6.53 million they earned on Jan 31 and Feb. 1.

Rolling Stone and Forbes reported after the broadcast, Shakira's catalog benefited the most across music charts. The official video of the show on YouTube had 30 million views in its first 24 hours, entering the top 20 of most viewed videos and topping the channel's "trending" charts in many countries. Within four days, it had over 100 million views and became the seventh-fastest-growing music-related video of all time, and also became the most-watched Super Bowl halftime performance of all time on YouTube, overtaking the Super Bowl 50 halftime show, which had 82 million views at the time it was overtaken. Shakira was Google's most searched artist in the US in 2020. On June 23, 2021, the posted video reached 210 million views, becoming the only NFL Super Bowl in history to reach this milestone.

== Legacy ==
In 2021, TicketSource revealed that the 2020 Super Bowl halftime show starring Shakira and Jennifer Lopez is the world's most popular halftime show in history. Similarly, it is considered as the most popular female performance in history. The show came second to only Queen's 1985 Live Aid performance as the world's most popular live performance in history. The halftime show is also the most viewed Super Bowl halftime show on YouTube with 323 million views as of March 2025. Peaking with 12.1 million viewers, it is also the most viewed halftime in Canada in history, almost one-third of the country's population.

In July 2023, a wax figure of Lopez based on her opening look during the show was unveiled at Madame Tussauds New York. It features her "sitting atop a replica of the Empire State Building-inspired pole Lopez was perched on in the Super Bowl performance."

== Documentary ==
A Jennifer Lopez documentary film based on the show titled Jennifer Lopez: Halftime was directed by Amanda Micheli. It premiered on the 2022 Tribeca Film Festival on June 8 and was released on Netflix on June 14, 2022.

== Set list ==
Set list adapted from Sports Illustrated and CBS Sports.

Shakira

"She Wolf" (contains elements of "Dare (La La La)")
"Empire" (contains elements of "Inevitable" and "Kashmir")
"Ojos Así" (contains elements of "Move")
"Whenever, Wherever"
"I Like It" (with Bad Bunny; contains elements of "En Barranquilla Me Quedo")
"Chantaje" (Versión Salsa with Bad Bunny; contains elements of "Callaíta")
"Hips Don't Lie" (contains elements of "Mapalé")

Jennifer Lopez

"We Will Rock You" (Intro, with elements from "Puerto Rico" by Frankie Cutlass)
"Jenny from the Block" (With elements from "Juicy Fruit" by Mtume and "Lean Back" by Terror Squad)
"Ain't It Funny (Murder Remix)" (with elements from "We Will Rock You")
"Get Right"
"Waiting For Tonight (3rd Party Cover, Hex's Momentous Club Mix)
"Que Calor" (With J Balvin, with elements from "Booty" and "El Anillo")
"Mi Gente" (With J Balvin, with elements from the Steve Aoki remix, "Lento" by Nfasis, "Love Don't Cost a Thing")
"On the Floor"

Shakira and Jennifer Lopez

"Let's Get Loud" (with Emme Muñiz; contains elements of "Born in the U.S.A.")
"Waka Waka (This Time for Africa)" (contains elements of "Icha")

== Awards and nominations ==
Year	Award	Category	Nominee(s)	Result	Ref.
2020	Dorian TV Awards	Best TV Musical Performance	Jennifer Lopez and Shakira	Nominated	
2020	Primetime Emmy Awards	Outstanding Variety Special (Live)	Ricky Kirshner, Jesse Craine, Jennifer Lopez and Shakira	Nominated	
2020	Primetime Emmy Awards	Outstanding Directing for a Variety Special	Hamish Hamilton	Nominated	
2020	Primetime Emmy Awards	Outstanding Lighting Design/Lighting Direction for a Variety Special	Robert Barnhart, David Grill, Pete Radice, Patrick Brazil and Jason Rudolph	Won	
2020	Primetime Emmy Awards	Outstanding Music Direction	Adam Wayne Blackstone	Nominated	
2021	ADG Excellence in Production Design Award	Variety Special	Bruce Rodgers	Nominated	
2021	Premios Nuestra Tierra	Best Live or TV or virtual Performance	Shakira	Won	

== See also ==
- 2020 in American television
