= London Theatre Direct =

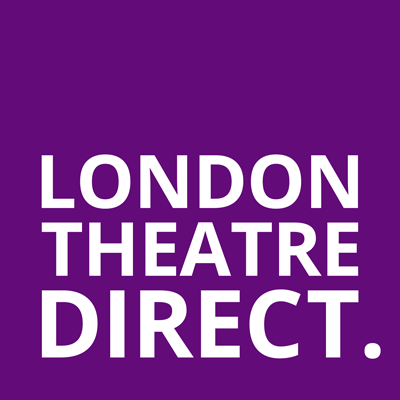
- Trade name: London Theatre Direct
- Type: Private
- Industry: Live Entertainment
- Founded: 1999
- Founder: Francis Hellyer, Emmanuel Ciolfi
- Headquarters: London, England, United Kingdom
- Area served: London, England, United Kingdom
- Key people: Francis Hellyer, Emmanuel Ciolfi, Sir Howard Panter, Dame Rosemary Squire, Helen Enright, Alexander Schmidt
- Products: Ticketing technology, ticket sales
- Subsidiaries: tickets.co.uk
- Website: londontheatredirect.com

London Theatre Direct is a ticket sales and distribution company based in the United Kingdom. The company's online platform caters to ticket sales for London musicals, plays, dance performances, operas and comedy shows, as well as attractions and pre-theatre dinner packages. The company was founded in 1999 and its headquarters are located in London.

== Company history ==
London Theatre Direct was founded in 1999 by Francis Hellyer and Emmanuel Ciolfi. Prior to his position at the company, Hellyer was involved in theatre and web technologies and Ciolfi had been working for both the ticketing and hospitality industries. As of 2018, the website had grown to over a million users. London Theatre Direct has been a member of the Society of Ticket Agents and Retailers, the UK self-regulatory body for the entertainment and ticketing industry since October 2001.

In 2016, the company invested in developing APIs that allows major venues and theatre groups to connect with its systems to sell tickets in real-time through its own website and partner sites. London Theatre Direct saw a quarterly rise in sales from API partners and venues of more than 600 percent as a result of this investment.

In August 2017, London Theatre Direct adopted TheatreMAD as their chosen charity to help raise funds for HIV and AIDS projects.

== Services ==
The online platform of London Theatre Direct provides ticketing services for musicals, plays, dance performances, operas, and comedy shows.

== Partners ==
In 2016, London Theatre Direct acquired MDQ Tickets to create new sales opportunities in the West End market. In addition to this, London Theatre Direct has teamed up with various major venues and theatre groups across London to maximise its product offering. The company works with various ticketing partners, including Tickets.com to promote and sell tickets for all events available through London Theatre Direct via its API.
