= Hammersmith Apollo =

Live entertainment venue in London

Hammersmith Apollo Eventim Apollo
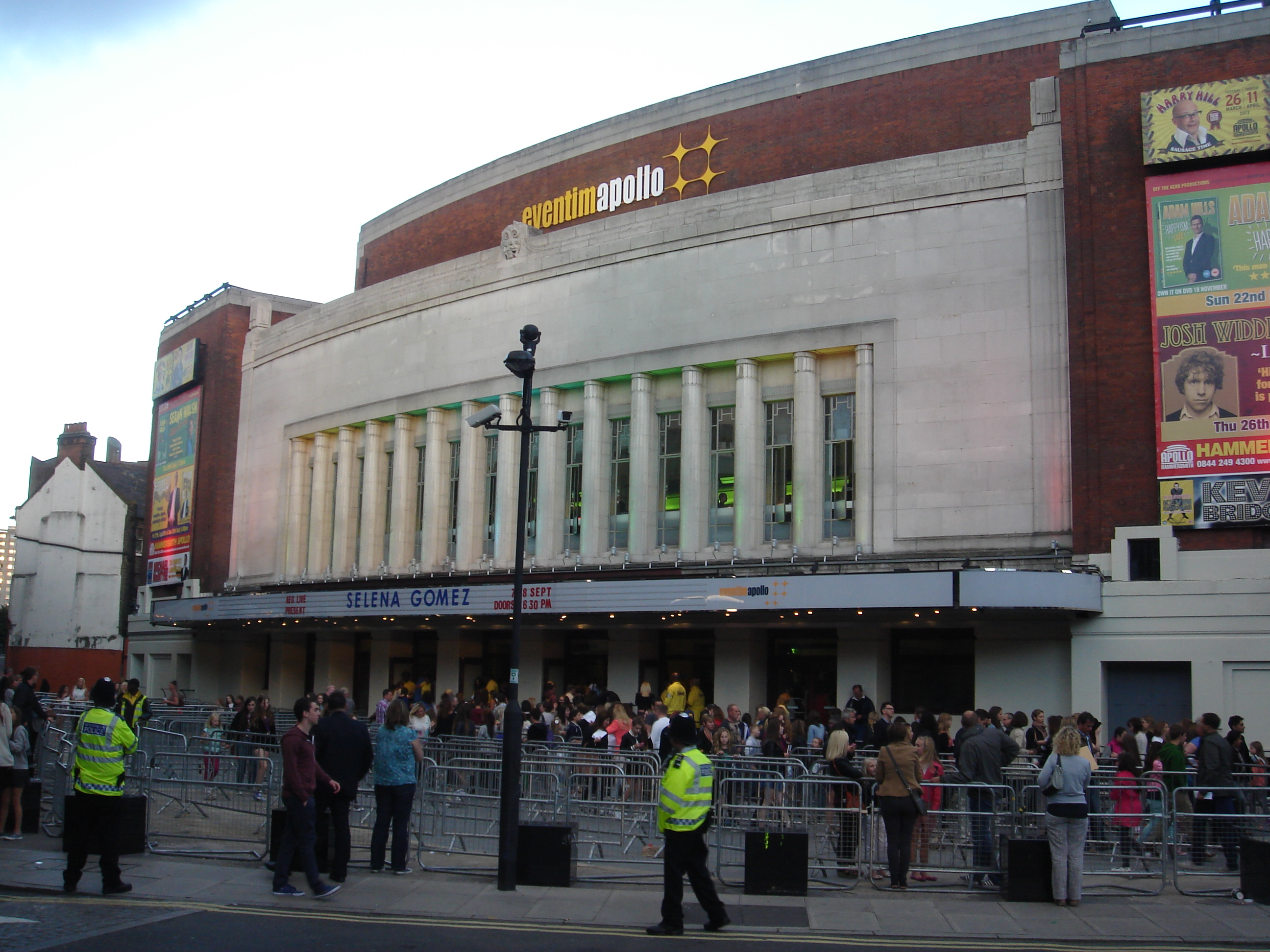
- The venue during its 2013 re-opening
- Interactive map of Hammersmith Apollo; Eventim Apollo
- Former names: Gaumont Palace (1932–1962); Hammersmith Odeon (1962–1993); Labatt's Apollo (1993–2002); Carling Apollo (2002–2009); HMV Apollo (2009–2012)
- Location: Hammersmith; London, W6; England
- Coordinates: 51.491°N 0.224°W:
- Owner: AEG Presents; Eventim UK
- Capacity: 3,487 (1932–2003); 5,039 (Open seating); 3,632 (Reserved seating)
- Designation: Grade II*
- Public transit: Hammersmith; Hammersmith

Construction
- Built: 1930–1932
- Opened: 28 March 1932; 94 years ago
- Renovated: 2013
- Cost: £5 million (2013 renovation)
- Architect: Robert Cromie

Website
- eventimapollo.com

The Hammersmith Apollo, called the Eventim Apollo for sponsorship reasons, previously and still commonly known as the Hammersmith Odeon, is a live entertainment performance venue opened in 1932 as a cinema named the Gaumont Palace. Located in Hammersmith, London, it is an art deco Grade II* listed building.

== History ==
Designed by Robert Cromie, who also renovated the Prince of Wales Theatre, in the Art Deco style, it opened in 1932 as the Gaumont Palace, with a seating capacity of nearly 3,500 people, being renamed the Hammersmith Odeon in 1962. It has had a string of names and owners, most recently AEG Live and Eventim UK. It became a Grade II listed building in 1990. The venue was later refurbished and renamed Labatt's Apollo following a sponsorship deal with Labatt Brewing Company (1993 or 1994).

In 2002, the venue was again renamed, this time to Carling Apollo after Carling brewery struck a deal with the owners, US-based Clear Channel Entertainment, now IHeartMedia. The event was marked by rock band AC/DC playing a one-off concert. All 5,000 tickets sold out in 4 minutes. In 2003, the stalls seats were made removable and now some concerts have full seating whilst others have standing-only in the stalls. In the latter format, the venue can accommodate around 5,000 people. The venue's listing was upgraded to Grade II* status in 2005. In 2006, the venue reverted to its former name, the Hammersmith Apollo. In 2007, the original 1932 Compton pipe organ, still present from the building's days as a cinema, was restored. The building was then bought by the MAMA Group.

On 14 January 2009, a placing announcement by HMV revealed that by selling additional shares, the company would raise money to fund a joint venture with the MAMA Group, to run eleven live music venues across the United Kingdom, including the Hammersmith Apollo. As a result, the venue was named HMV Apollo from 2009 until 2012. Other venues purchased include The Forum in London's Kentish Town, the Birmingham Institute and Aberdeen's Moshulu. The venue was sold by HMV Group in May 2012 to AEG Live and CTS Eventim. In 2013, the venue was closed for an extensive refurbishment which was carried out by architect Foster Wilson. The venue reopened as the Eventim Apollo on 7 September 2013, with a concert performance by Selena Gomez.

== The Compton pipe organ ==
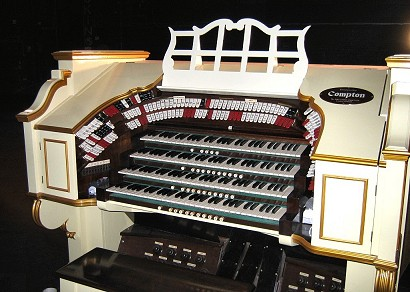
Restored organ console, 2007

The original 1932 Compton pipe organ remains installed at the Apollo and was fully restored to playing condition in 2007. It has a four-manual console which rises through the stage on a new lift and about 1,200 organ pipes housed in large chambers above the front stalls ceiling. Having fallen into disrepair, the organ was disconnected in the 1990s and the console removed from the building. At the insistence of English Heritage and the local council, however, it was reinstated and the entire organ restored. At a launch party, on 25 July 2007, an invited audience and media representatives witnessed a recital by Richard Hills.

== In popular culture ==
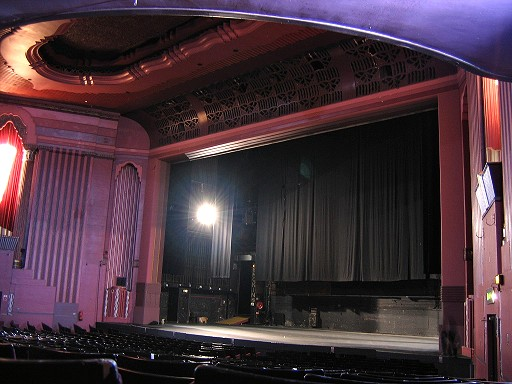
View of the stage and proscenium, 2007

Many bands have released live albums, videos or DVDs of concerts held at the Apollo, such as Queen, Black Sabbath, Rush, DIO, Hawkwind, Iron Maiden, Celtic Frost, Kings of Leon, Tears for Fears, Bananarama, Dire Straits, Frank Zappa, Sophie Ellis-Bextor, David Bowie, Bruce Springsteen and the E Street Band, Japan, Erasure, Spear of Destiny, Motörhead, and Robbie Williams. In September 1979 Gary Numan recorded his Touring Principle show at the venue. Kate Bush released a video and record EP of her concerts at the Odeon from her first tour in 1979. Duran Duran recorded at the Hammersmith Odeon on 16 November 1982 and released Live at Hammersmith '82!. Depeche Mode made one of its first concert videos for a Danish television at the Hammersmith on 25 October 1982. Dire Straits played the final two concerts of Love Over Gold Tour at the Odeon on 22–23 July 1983, and the resulting album Alchemy: Dire Straits Live was released the following year.

Kylie Minogue performed a one-off concert in the venue in 2003 and released a DVD of the performance in 2004. Minogue also performed the last show of her Anti Tour in the venue on 3 April 2012. Girls Aloud released a DVD of their concert at the Apollo in 2005. Bruce Springsteen's 1975 concert, released as part of the Born to Run 30th Anniversary Edition package and later as Hammersmith Odeon London '75. Melodic death metal band In Flames also released a DVD that featured footage of a December 2004 performance there. Comedian and actor Eddie Izzard's show Glorious was also released as a DVD. Rush recorded their 1978 performance and later included it in their three-disc set, Different Stages. American musician Tori Amos released a series of six live albums in 2005 known as The Original Bootlegs, one of which was recorded at the Apollo. Photographs of The Who outside the Hammersmith Odeon appear on their 1973 album Quadrophenia. Pink Floyd guitarist David Gilmour performed three nights at the venue in April 1984, documented on the David Gilmour Live 1984 concert film; these shows featured Roy Harper guesting on "Short and Sweet" and Pink Floyd bandmate Nick Mason on drums for "Comfortably Numb". In 1984 the London-based band Iron Maiden recorded side 4 of their double live album 'Live After Death' at the venue. Iron Maiden's affection for the Hammersmith Odeon previously resulted in the filming of a 1982 performance which was subsequently released as Beast over Hammersmith.

Other acts have made music videos featuring clips from performances at the Apollo; Kelly Clarkson made a special version of her "Breakaway" video using clips from her concert at the Apollo in 2006.

The Hammersmith Apollo is seen in the American romantic comedy film Just My Luck where McFly perform. In the movie, the venue stands-in for the Hard Rock Café. It is also the location in The Football Factory where the Chelsea fans board the bus for Liverpool. It is mentioned in the poem "Glam Rock: The Poem" by the poet Robert Archambeau. The exterior of the (then) Gaumont Palace was used as the "Grand" cinema in the 1957 British film The Smallest Show on Earth.

== Noteworthy performances ==
=== 1950s ===
- On 25 March 1958, Buddy Holly performed two shows at the venue. An altercation after the first with Joe B. Mauldin saw Holly lose the caps to two of his front teeth; he effected a temporary repair with chewing gum and performed the second show with the gum in place. These were his last shows in the United Kingdom.

=== 1960s ===
- In the early 1960s, many American acts performed at the Odeon, including Tony Bennett, Count Basie, Ella Fitzgerald with Duke Ellington, Louis Armstrong and Woody Herman and the Herd. In 1966, Johnny Cash performed at the venue.
- In late 1964 and early 1965, the Beatles played 38 shows over 21 nights. Special guests on the bill included Elkie Brooks and the original Yardbirds, featuring Eric Clapton.

=== 1970s ===
- The photo booklet that forms part of The Who's Quadrophenia album features pictures of the venue (particularly within the centre spread;) the photos of the main character (Jimmy) waiting, kneeling beside his GS Scooter outside the venue as the members of the band take their groupies to a limo were taken during a photo shoot.
- On 28 October 1972, the "Giants of Jazz", a group consisting of jazz musicians Dizzy Gillespie, Kai Winding, Sonny Stitt, Thelonious Monk, Al McKibbon and Art Blakey – played two concerts at the Hammersmith at 6:30 and 9:30 P.M.
- In July 1973, David Bowie performed his final concert as Ziggy Stardust at the venue. The concert was filmed by American documentary filmmaker D. A. Pennebaker, who intercut scenes of fans outside the venue, Bowie in the dressing room, with the concert footage. The film was not released until 1979, and is now available on DVD as Ziggy Stardust & The Spiders From Mars.
- In December 1974, Elton John played a televised Christmas concert for the BBC's Old Grey Whistle Test.
- In November and December 1975, Queen performed several shows at the Hammersmith Odeon during the A Night at the Opera Tour. The show of 24 December was broadcast by the BBC and released in 2015 on CD, Vinyl and DVD/Blu-ray as A Night at the Odeon – Hammersmith 1975.
- On 14 April 1976 Steve Harley and the Cockney Rebels recorded live at the Hammersmith Odeon. Some performances are available on their "The Best Years Of Our Lives" triple album.
- On 15–16 May 1976, Kiss made their first UK appearances, supported by UK rockers Stray; tickets sold out in 2 hours for their two-night stay.
- Genesis featured in a 6-night run, 09-14 June 1976, making the UK debut of their "A Trick of the Tail" tour. This was the band's first post-Peter Gabriel album and tour, with Phil Collins stepping out from behind his drum kit to front the vocals. Bill Bruford, formerly of YES, stepped in on drums for this tour before giving way to Chester Thompson on subsequent tours.
- In 1976, much of Thin Lizzy's live album Live and Dangerous was recorded at the Hammersmith on the Johnny The Fox Tour. Again in 1981, Lynott and his gang appeared in the venue for the recording of the BBC's In Concert. The disc are released as a part of the Box Set At The BBC, in 2011. Some of this tracks also appeared in the deluxe editions of Chinatown and Thunder and Lightning. Finally, the double live album Life/Live was recorded in the venue in 1981 and 1983, with the participation of guitarists Eric Bell, Brian Robertson and Gary Moore. The guitarist Snowy White participated on three tracks recorded in 1981 in the same venue.
- The progressive rock band Camel recorded some tracks in 1976 for the release of a future live album. The album was released in 1978, and is called A Live Record. The entire concert was released and made part of the deluxe edition of Moonmadness. The same concert was broadcast by the BBC and released in DVD format. The DVD was called Moondances.
- In November 1977, The Tubes played 10 shows and recorded the live double album What Do You Want from Live at the Hammersmith. The album was released in February 1978.
- In 1978, Black Sabbath, with Ozzy Osbourne still a member, held concerts celebrating 10 years of career in the venue. The opening band was Van Halen. The concert was recorded and released on video and later on DVD, with the name Never Say Die: A Decade of Black Sabbath. In 30–31 December 1981, the band now with Dio recorded their concerts at this venue. The gig was released on disc and vinyl in 2007, and later as part of the Deluxe edition of Mob Rules. In 1994 the show in Apollo was recorded and released one year later titled Cross Purposes Live.
- On 24 February 1978, Sweet played their first concert at Hammersmith Odeon. It was to be their last British show featuring singer Brian Connolly.
- On 20 February 1978, Rush recorded 11 tracks from their "A Farewell to Kings" tour, including tracks from all of their first five albums. These tracks were not released at the time. They were included as a bonus disc on their 10 November 1998 release of Different Stages Live which included recordings from both their 1994 Counterparts and 1997 Test for Echo tours.
- Whitesnake recorded tracks for their live album Live...in the Heart of the City on 23 November 1978. The album also included tracks that were later recorded (also at the Hammersmith Odeon) on 23 and 24 June 1980. Years later, David Coverdale and this gang appears in Hammersmith for the recorded of Live... In the Still of the Night album and DVD set.
- The albums 461 Ocean Boulevard and Slowhand of the guitarist Eric Clapton were reissued in double CD deluxe format accompanied with a live album recorded at the venue, depicting tours of 1974 and 1976.
- Frank Zappa recorded parts of his 1979 album Sheik Yerbouti and parts of his 1981 album Tinsel Town Rebellion at the venue. Zappa's triple album Hammersmith Odeon, recorded in 1978, was released posthumously in 2010 by the Zappa Family Trust.
- Kate Bush also performed the same year, and released a live video and record EP of her 1979 concerts.
- On 13–15 December 1979, Cliff Richard played at the Hammersmith Odeon during the Rock'n'Roll Juvenile Tour.
- In December 1979, Queen, the Clash, Elvis Costello, the Who, the Pretenders and Paul McCartney and Wings and many more artists played several nights. The Hammersmith Odeon hosted the four-night Concerts for the People of Kampuchea, a benefit concert to raise money for Cambodian victims of the dictator Pol Pot, of which Queen played the first night. Paul McCartney and Kurt Waldheim organised the event.
- The Police played three shows at Hammersmith Odeon in late 1979 promoting their Reggatta de Blanc album (1979-09-22, 1979-09-23 and 1979-12-18).

=== 1980s ===
- In 1980, the rock band UFO, without Michael Schenker, recorded the BBC programme In Concert. In 1981, they again played in the venue for the same programme. These two discs are in the UFO on Air: At the BBC, released in 2013.
- Yellow magic Orchestra played in October 1980 as part of their 2nd World Tour and taped by BBC as their promo. This live version would later featured in their "World Tour 1980" live album.
- In May 1980, the English/Australian instrumental band Sky played two nights (19th & 20th) at the Hammersmith Odeon during the tour of their popular Sky 2 album. The concert was filmed and later broadcast (in two parts) on BBC TV's "Rhythm on Two" on 24 & 31 July 1980. The venue's Compton organ was played briefly by keyboardist Francis Monkman for their encore of the Toccata.
- British heavy metal group, Iron Maiden, played at Hammersmith Odeon 24 times between 1980–2005. In 1980, Iron Maiden played two consecutive nights opening for Judas Priest. In 1981 the band played here their a very first headline show with French band Trust as the support act. Iron Maiden show from 1982 was recorded and published as the Beast over Hammersmith double live CD being a part of Eddie's Archive box released in 2002. The clips from that night were used as a part of 12 Wasted Years (1987) documentary and The History of Iron Maiden – Part 1: The Early Days DVD released in 2004. Between 1983 and 1988, the band played multiple sold out nights, including six shows in 1986 as a part of Somewhere on Tour 1986/87. The fourth side of double live album Live After Death was recorded during the four nights played by the band as a part of World Slavery Tour. In 1990, Iron Maiden played here their first show in London with a new member, guitarist Janick Gers.
- Miles Davis played in 1982 with his Jazz fusion band. The concert was released some years later in DVD.
- Def Leppard recorded the videos of Let It Go, High & Dry (Saturday Night), and Bringing on the Heartbreak at the venue.
- In December 1985, Hawkwind filmed a concert from their Chronicle of the Black Sword tour. The recordings were subsequently released as the Live Chronicles album and The Chronicle of the Black Sword video.
- In 1983, Dire Straits recorded the concerts for a future release. Finished launching in 1984 the double album Alchemy and a video with the same name. The video was remastered and released on DVD and Blu-ray in 2009, in its full version.
- The black metal band Venom released a double album in 1985 called Eine Kleine Nachtmusik. One of the discs was recorded in the venue. The band was banned in 1984 because they ruined the ceiling of the theatre with a show of fireworks (during the track Countess Bathory). The show was recorded and released on video in 1984 with the name Seven Dates to Hell, with opening by the young Metallica. The following year, the band recorded the concert at this venue for a television special, named Live from London. Both shows were released on DVD during the 2000s.
- In 1980, Blondie performed one of their most famous shows. Robert Fripp joined them on guitar, and their live cover of David Bowie's "'Heroes'" (which was later used as a B-side) was recorded there. In addition, some more live tracks recorded were later used as bonus tracks on the 2001 rerelease of the Eat to the Beat album.
- On 20 September 1980, Randy Rhoads performed one of his first shows, with new musical soulmate Ozzy Osbourne, on the Blizzard of Ozz Tour, they returned on 26 October.
- in 15 December 1983, British pop group, Tears For Fears, played in the venue and was filmed and released as In My Mind's Eye in 1984. This recording is also the first time Head Over Heels, Mothers Talk, Broken, and The Working Hour was filmed live. This was Re-Released in 2013 on DVD as part of the 30th anniversary of The Hurting.
- In 1982, Duran Duran performed during promotion for their Rio album. The concert was filmed and released as Live at Hammersmith '82! in 2009, as a CD-DVD combo pack.
- On 25 October 1982, Depeche Mode performed there as part of their A Broken Frame Tour. The concert was filmed and parts were released as Live at Hammersmith Odeon London in 2006, as a DVD included in the remastered album, A Broken Frame.
- In 1982, Elton John performed a series of concerts with his reunited "Classic" band, promoting his albums The Fox and Jump Up!. A concert on Christmas Eve featured a medley of Christmas carols and a rare live duet of "Don't Go Breaking My Heart" with Kiki Dee.
- In 1982, Japan played a six-night residency from 17 to 22 November. These were the band's final performances in the UK and the final night's performance was recorded and then released in 1983 on VHS and audio as Oil on Canvas.
- In 1983, Marillion performed the final date of their tour supporting their debut album, Script for a Jester's Tear. This also marked the final performance with drummer Mick Pointer. The performance was filmed and released as Recital of the Script.
- In 1984, Pink Floyd guitarist David Gilmour performed three shows at the venue on his About Face solo tour, which was documented on the concert video David Gilmour Live 1984.
- On 21 September 1986, Metallica performed at the Odeon during their Master of Puppets Tour. This is one of the band's last performances with bassist Cliff Burton, who was killed in a bus crash, six days later and also featured guitarist John Marshall as James Hetfield was recovering from a skateboard accident. This performance formed the basis for the Hammersmith Apollo's appearance in video game Guitar Hero: Metallica in 2009, complete with Master of Puppets-themed stage.
- Between 15 and 20 December 1986, the Norwegian band a-ha held 6 concerts at the Hammersmith Odeon.
- At the start of the seminal Public Enemy album, It Takes a Nation of Millions to Hold Us Back, they are heard addressing the Hammersmith Odeon crowd at a concert there in 1987. Due to trouble outside the venue before and after the show, the Hammersmith Odeon refused to host any rap groups for several years afterwards.
- On 10 July 1987, the first Soviet rock musicians ever to perform in Britain Autograph and Dialogue at Russian Rock Gala during Capital Music Festival.

=== 1990s ===
- During the early 1990s, the venue played host to stage productions such as Joseph and the Amazing Technicolor Dreamcoat.
- Following 4 sold out shows on their 'Slippery When Wet' UK tour in November 1986, Bon Jovi returned to the venue on 10 January 1990 during their second visit to the UK on their New Jersey Syndicate Tour to play a special one-off show, in aid of Nordoff-Robbins Music Therapy.
- In March 1991, the venue played host to CCM and pop star Amy Grant during her Heart In Motion Tour.
- In summer of 1992, Erasure played 8 consecutive nights at the Hammersmith Odeon on the opening of their "Phantasmagorical Entertainment Tour".
- Megadeth recorded their performance on 30 September 1992, for a Concert DVD in support for their album Countdown to Extinction.
- Dio recorded their previously unreleased "Live in London-Hammersmith Apollo 1993" Performance on 12 December 1993, a Blu-ray Disc released in 2014 in support for their then recent album Strange Highways.
- Musical theatre star Michael Ball has performed at the Hammersmith Apollo on nine occasions—each time selling out. His concerts in December 1993 and 1994, were recorded by BBC Radio 2. He also recorded his 2003, 2007 and 2013 concerts for DVD release.
- Black Sabbath recorded their Cross Purposes Live album/video, with singer Tony Martin, on Wednesday 13 April 1994.
- In July 1995, Riverdance made its UK debut at the Apollo, selling out its initial four-week run and returning in the fall for another 19 weeks, breaking box office records in the process.
- In November 1997, Scottish comedian Billy Connolly performed five sold out nights.
- On 14 July 1998, Doctor Dolittle, a musical by Leslie Bricusse (based on his 1967 film and the Hugh Lofting children's books) made its world premiere starring Phillip Schofield. The production closed on 26 June 1999.
- On 14 December 1999, Blast! a new musical based on American Drum and Bugle Corps premiered at the Hamersmith Apollo. A PBS special of the London production aired on 5 August 2000.

=== 2000s ===
- In October 2002, Prince played 3 nights of his 'One Nite Alone... Tour'.
- On 21 October 2003, rock band AC/DC performed at the Apollo. The event sold out online in just four minutes. The lead singer Brian Johnson was suffering from a lung infection on the night of the gig.
- On 15 November 2003, Kylie Minogue launched her studio album Body Language with a press conference and a one-off show entitled Money Can't Buy, no tickets were offered for sale publicly and only invited guests and competition winners attended the show.
- In 2004, the venue was part of the Carling Live 24 event, which saw Feeder play their only date of that year. The venue also spawned the BBC television series Live at the Apollo, originally titled Jack Dee Live at the Apollo.
- On 2 September 2005, Iron Maiden performed a special fund raising sold-out show during their Eddie Rips Up the World Tour for former drummer Clive Burr, who was suffering from multiple sclerosis.
- On 25 November 2006, Video Games Live presented the first ever UK video game concert at the Hammersmith Apollo as part of their 2006 World Tour. A parody of the Hammersmith Odeon was made for Guitar Hero III: Legends of Rock, called Ye Olde Royal Odeon. The game Guitar Hero: Metallica features the real Hammersmith Apollo as a playable venue.
- On 18 and 19 December, comedy rock duo Tenacious D performed on their Pick of Destiny Tour, Neil Hamburger opened on both dates.
- On 19 June 2007, OMD filmed their Architecture & Morality and more comeback-tour in this theatre.
- In September 2008, comedian Michael McIntyre performed shows around theatres in the UK and his filmed performance at the Hammersmith Apollo became the best selling debut comedy DVD of all time.
- In March 2009, SpongeBob SquarePants: The Musical (The Sponge Who Could Fly) premiered at the Apollo.
- On 11 July 2009, Thunder played their last concert in a sold out Hammersmith Apollo, as being the last stop on their 20 Years & Out tour. The show was also filmed and recorded for a last Thunder live DVD.
- On 29 November 2009, British Christian rock band Delirious? played their farewell concert at the venue. The show was sold out and was recorded for a live album and DVD.
- On 15 December 2009, the Apollo hosted the UK premiere of It Might Get Loud, a documentary film that covers the careers of guitarists The Edge, Jimmy Page, and Jack White. Page was the only star of the film to attend the UK premiere.

=== 2010s ===
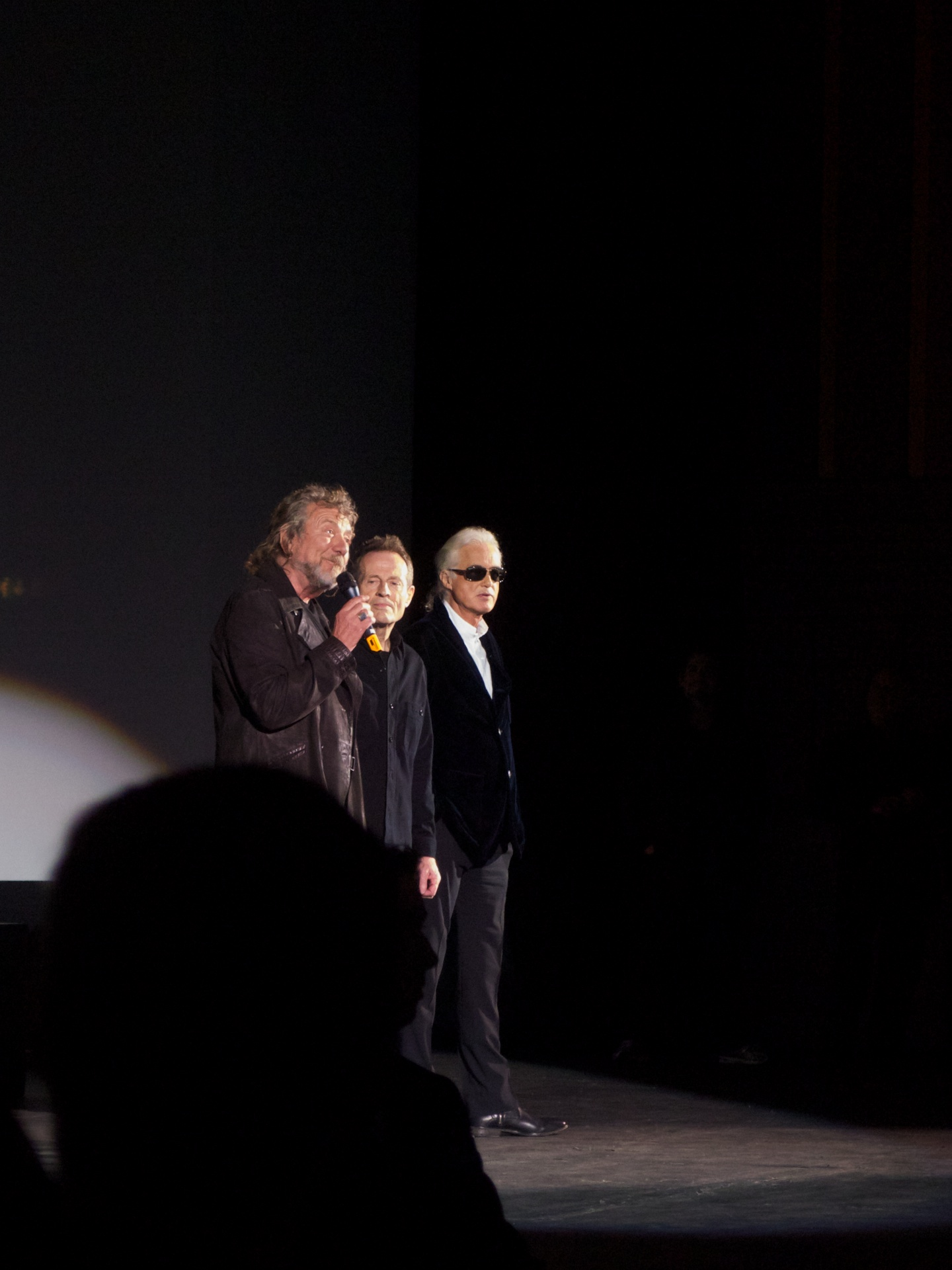
Led Zeppelin answering questions at a press conference for the premiere of Celebration Day at the Hammersmith Apollo in 2012

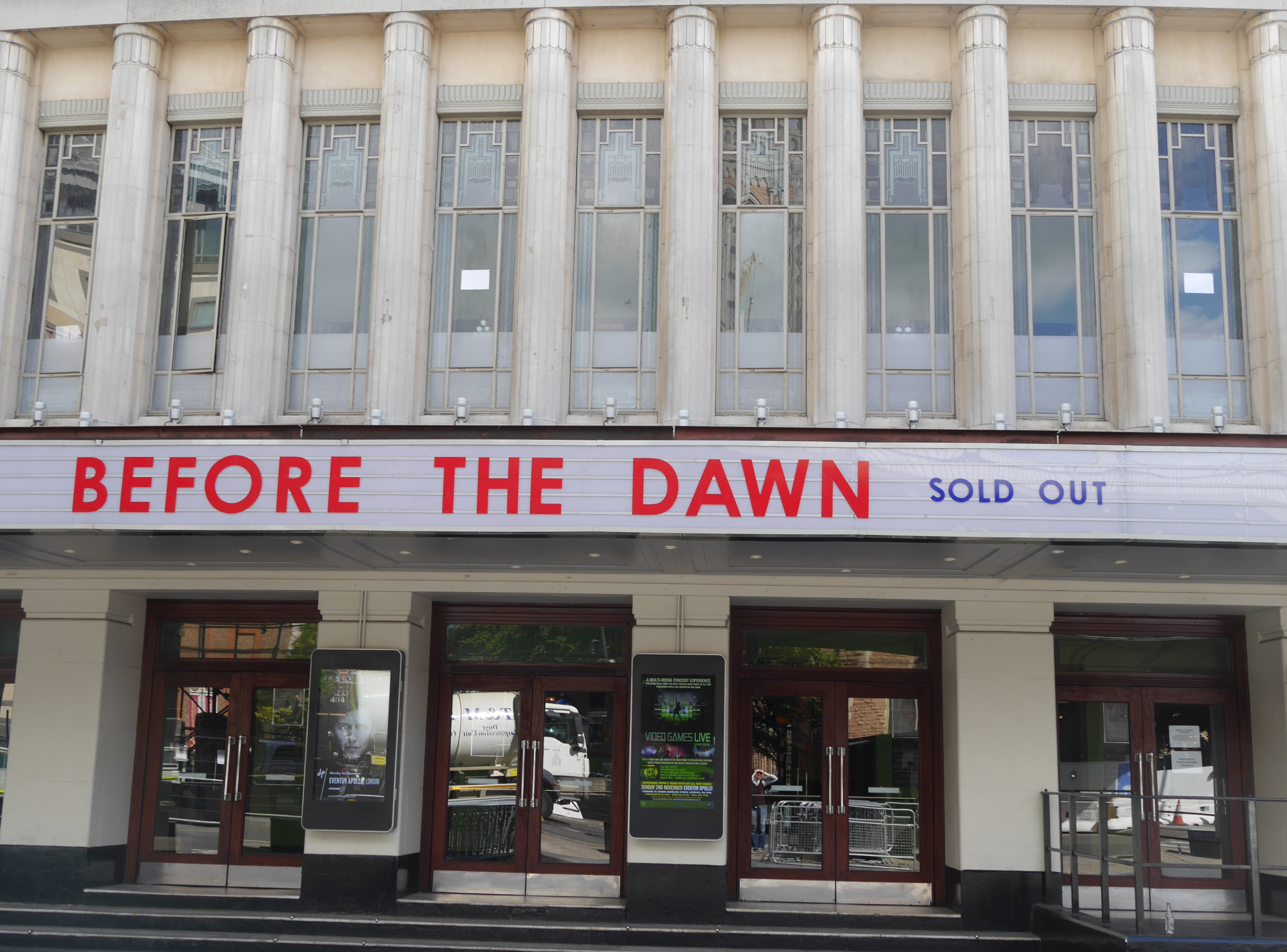
Kate Bush – Before the Dawn, Hammersmith Apollo

- On 8 April 2010, The Infidel, a comedy film directed by David Baddiel and starring Omid Djalili, was premiered. The organ was played by Richard Hills as the audience arrived and in the interval. This was the first film premiere at the Apollo for more than 20 years.
- On 4 May 2010, the Italian songwriter Vasco Rossi, had a sold-out concert during his "Tour Europe indoor". The whole concert was recorded and issued on 22 June under the name Vasco London Instant Live 4 May 2010.
- On 14–18 July 2010, American magicians and comedians Penn & Teller performed, their first UK performance in more than 16 years.
- Bob Dylan performed three concerts, ending his 2011 Never Ending Tour with Mark Knopfler. These three dates brings to total of Dylan performances at the venue to twenty-four. He performed there six times in 1990, eight times in 1991, six times in 1993, once in 2003 and three times in 2011.
- On 26 May 2012, Judas Priest performed the last show of their Epitaph World Tour, and it was filmed for later DVD release.
- On 21 December 2012, Brian Cox and Robin Ince hosted a show containing performances by scientists, comedians, actors and other apocalypse sceptics for a show to coincide with the predicted Mayan apocalypse entitled "The End of the World Show".
- On 23–24 February 2013, Kanye West played two shows as a part of a small European tour which tested a new setup which featured surround vision visuals. The shows featured West wearing a white sci-fi straitjacket, a glittering, skin-tight crystal bondage mask obscuring his face. The theme of the shows centered on icy, glacial environmental visuals.
- On 26 February 2013, as part of the first series of the ITV2 music show The Big Reunion, seven chart-topping groups who were big names in the UK pop music scene between the 1990s and early 2000s—Five, 911, Atomic Kitten, B*Witched, Blue, Honeyz and Liberty X—performed in a comeback concert. Portions of the concert were shown during the last episode of the series on 28 March 2013, and the full concert itself was released on DVD in April 2013.
- On 15–16 March 2013, the original line-up of Status Quo played two sold-out shows on their Reunion Tour, after being apart for 32 years. These concerts were released on CD.
- On 19–20 May 2013, Lana Del Rey played two sold-out shows during her Paradise Tour, performing her biggest hits, including her new single, Young and Beautiful.
- On 7 September 2013, Selena Gomez opened the newly renovated theatre on her Stars Dance Tour, the only performance in the UK for the tour. The date also commissioned the venue's new name, Eventim Apollo.
- On 21 February 2014, as part of the second series of The Big Reunion, six pop groups—3T, A1, Damage, Eternal, Girl Thing and newly-formed supergroup 5th Story—performed in a comeback concert. Portions of the concert were shown during the last episode of the series on 27 March 2014, and the full concert itself was released in segments on the show's YouTube channel.
- On 19 April 2014, Adam Ant performed his former band Adam and the Ants' debut album Dirk Wears White Sox live in its entirety with a band including former Ants Dave Barbarossa (from the original album) and Leigh Gorman. This was released in 2015 as concert film Dirk Live At The Apollo.
- From August to October 2014, Kate Bush undertook a 22 date residency called Before the Dawn at the Apollo. These performances were her first live shows in nearly 35 years.
- On 3 February 2015, the venue was chosen by the EBU/BBC as host for the Eurovision Song Contest's 60-year celebration event, presented by Graham Norton and Petra Mede, and televised across Europe and Australia via the Eurovision network. Conchita Wurst, Loreen and Natasha St-Pier were the first confirmed acts. The event took place on 31 March 2015.
- On 20 and 21 September 2015, British singer Morrissey performed what he dubbed his 'last UK shows ever' at the venue.
- On 6 December 2016, the venue hosted the Royal Variety Performance which was later televised by ITV.
- On 27 January 2017, the venue hosted Eurovision: You Decide, the UK's national selection show for the Eurovision Song Contest 2017 and aired live on BBC Two.
- On 17 March 2017, St Patrick's Day, Devin Townsend made a complete play through of the album Ocean Machine, twenty years after its first release; supported by Leprous and Tesseract.
- On 17 February 2018, Cumbrian indie band Wild Beasts played their final "farewell" show dubbed "End Come Too Soon".
- In April 2018, it was confirmed that the venue would host the live shows of Britain's Got Talent that year. The live shows returned to the venue in 2019 and again since 2022.
- On 17 June 2018, Monsta X had The Connect World Tour in London.
- On 16 July 2018, the film Mamma Mia! Here We Go Again was premiered.

=== 2020s ===
- On 17 February 2020, Eric Clapton performed a tribute concert to former Cream and Blind Faith bandmate Ginger Baker who had died the previous year. His special guests included Roger Waters, Nile Rodgers, Ronnie Wood, Kenney Jones and Blind Faith bandmate Steve Winwood. The performance included Cream songs not performed since the 60s and a near complete performance of the Blind Faith album.
- On 21–22 February 2020, progressive metal band Dream Theater played two concerts to promote their fourteenth album Distance over Time, also recording both concerts that were later released as Distant Memories – Live in London live DVD.
- On 9 July 2022, the 90th anniversary Gang Show special is performed here.
- On 25 July 2023, Blur performed a one-off performance, playing their album, The Ballad of Darren, in its entirety, along with some rarely or previously never played songs.
- On July 11 2025, The Teskey Brothers performed.
- The Umamusume: Pretty Derby anime franchise is expected to hold its first shows outside of Japan at this venue on January 19 and 20, 2027, following the cancellation of the shows in Los Angeles, California.

== See also ==
- Live at the Apollo (TV series)
