= Zoonga =

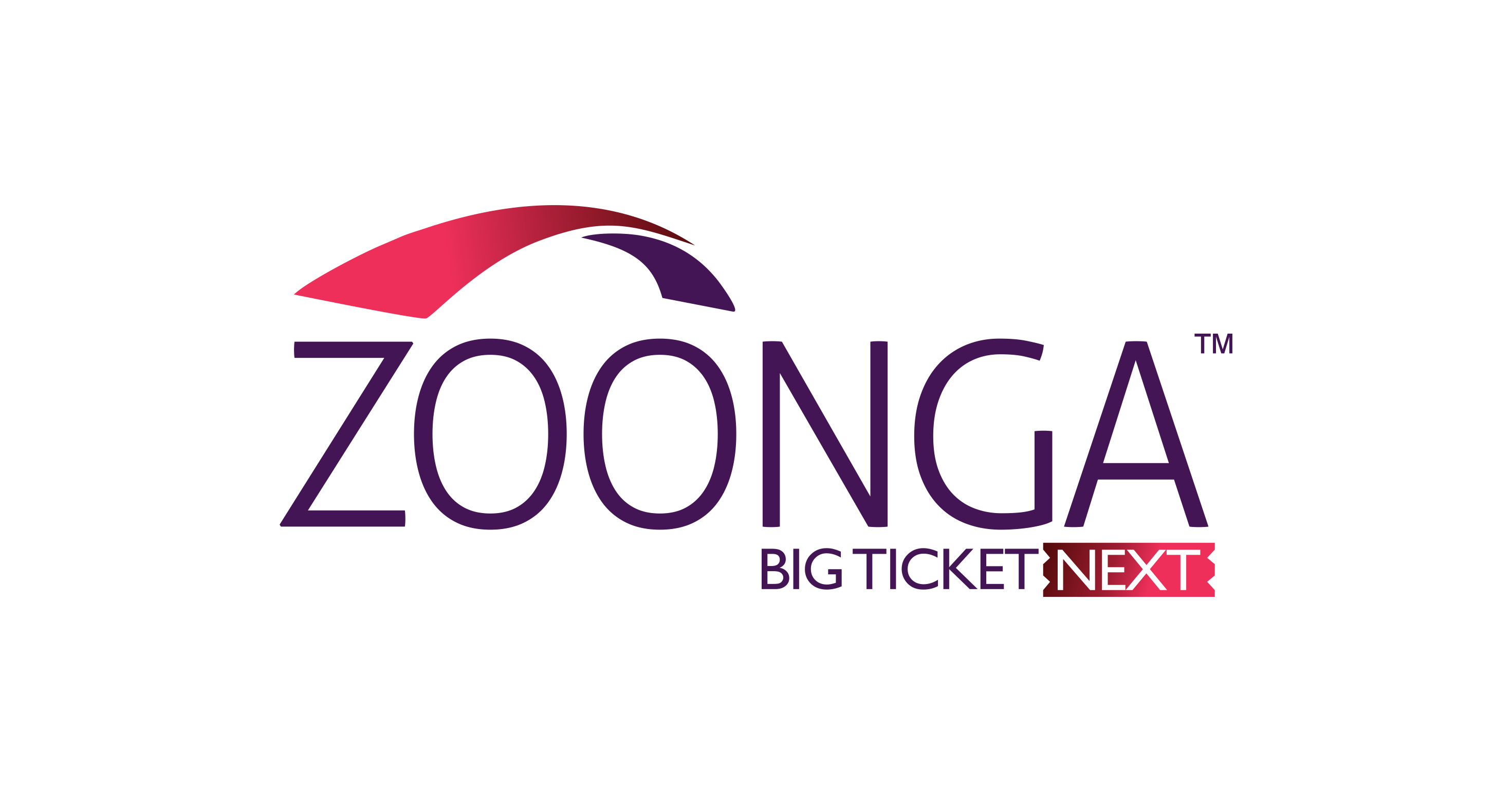
- Formerly: Kyazoonga
- Company type: Private
- Industry: Ticketing, Sports & Entertainment, E-commerce
- Founded: 2007
- Founder: Neetu Bhatia, Arpita Majumder, Akash Bhatia
- Number of locations: 10
- Area served: Worldwide
- Products: Sports and entertainment ticketing, Online event ticketing, Venues box-office ticketing, Retail outlets ticketing, Ticketing technology, Ticket sales, Marketing, Distribution of event tickets and information, Support of venue renovation
- Website: https://www.zoonga.com

Zoonga (formerly known as Kyazoonga) is a privately held global ticketing company that operates an online ticketing service which is accessible via its websites and mobile apps. It also provides its service through retail outlets and box-office distribution channels. Users can use the service to purchase tickets to major sports, entertainment, leisure and lifestyle events and venues across the world. Zoonga's partners include sports franchises, teams, concert promoters and event organizers. As a primary ticket outlet, typically, Zoonga's clients (promoters) control their events, and Zoonga acts as an agent, selling the tickets that the clients make available to them. It is also the only ticketing company from the Indian subcontinent to have qualified as a finalist for an Olympics ticketing bid.

== Founders ==
Neetu Bhatia is the co-founder and CEO of Zoonga. All co-founders of Zoonga are alumni of Massachusetts Institute of Technology (MIT) and MIT Sloan. Akash Bhatia, her brother, is also a co-founder. A software engineer turned entrepreneur, Akash conceived the original idea during one of his visits back home to India. Arpita Majumder is the third co-founder and COO of Zoonga.

== Funding ==
Zoonga is backed by an $18 billion New York-based hedge fund that has multiple investments in e-media companies.

=== Ratan Tata investment ===
In 2016, Mr. Ratan Tata, chairman emeritus of the Tata Group, became a strategic investor in the company.

== History ==
=== Early history ===
Launched in early 2007 as India's first entertainment and sports ticketing company, Zoonga now tickets events in many parts of the world. Zoonga started with movies ticketing first but subsequently stopped.

=== Events ticketed ===
1. Tata Open Maharashtra 2019
2. ICC Women's World T20 2018
3. The Royal Melbourne Show
4. Cricket West Indies
5. FIFA U-17 World Cup 2017
6. Jamshedpur FC in the Indian Super League
7. Sachin Tendulkar 200th (retirement) Test match
8. Caribbean Premier League
9. Guns N' Roses India Tour
10. ICC Cricket World Cup 2011 in India, Sri Lanka, Bangladesh
11. III Commonwealth Youth Games

== Product overview ==
=== Users and fans ===
Users can discover events using search and filters such as categories, dates, location, and price. Before booking, users must provide personal and payment information.

=== Concerts/events/teams promoters and organizers ===
Clients provide inventory, prices and other details for their venues and event listings. Pricing is determined by the clients.

== Corporate information ==
=== Office locations ===
It has offices in Mumbai, New Delhi, Pune, Dubai, Melbourne and in the Caribbean.

== Controversies ==
=== 2011 Cricket World Cup ===
During the ticket sales for the semis and finals of the Cricket World Cup, the site crashed due to heavy traffic from millions of fans looking to purchase tickets with a limited supply of tickets available for sale.

=== Sachin Tendulkar Retirement Test ===
Several fans were left angry at the inability to purchase tickets for Sachin Tendulkar's 200th and final Test match in November 2013.
