= Rob Zangardi =

American fashion stylist

- Born: Columbus, Ohio, U.S.
- Education: Ohio University
- Occupations: Fashion stylist; costume designer
- Known for: Styling work with Jennifer Lopez, Rihanna, Gwen Stefani, and other entertainers

Rob Zangardi is an American fashion stylist and costume designer who is the founder of Auter.

== Early life and education ==
Zangardi was born and raised in Columbus, Ohio. He attended Ohio University, where he earned a degree in fashion merchandising.

== Career ==
After graduating from university, Zangardi moved to New York City and joined MTV's wardrobe department, Two years later, he became the costume designer for NBC’s Last Call with Carson Daly. During that period, he met stylist Mariel Haenn, who had succeeded him at MTV, through host SuChin Pak. The two eventually formed the creative partnership Rob & Mariel.

Their collaboration took off in 2007 with the Rihanna “Umbrella” video. They then went on to work with Pharrell Williams, Jennifer Lopez, Jay Z, Beyonce, Gwen Stefani, Shakira, Lily Collins, Hailee Seinfeld, and Rachel McAdams.

In 2011, they helped shape Jennifer Lopez’s headline-grabbing style during American Idol, arena tours, and brand campaigns. They also worked with Gwen Stefani and NoDoubt as they returned to the spotlight. The duo also outfitted Lopez’s widely discussed Anthony Vaccarello gown at the 2013 Grammy Awards and several prominent Met Gala appearances for various public figures.

Beyond styling, Zangardi continues to design costumes for stage and television. With Haenn, he oversaw more than 200 looks, created with Versace, for Jennifer Lopez’s Super Bowl LIV halftime show.

In 2021, Zangardi and Haenn expanded into jewelry design, launching a limited fine-jewelry line, VRAI x RandM, in a joint initiative with Vrai. The collection featured designs inspired by their Italian heritage and symbolic themes such as unity and empowerment.

In 2025, Zangardi started an outerwear line called Auter. In October 2026, Auter’s Fall 2026 collection went on sale at the Los Angeles retailer Maxfield, which hosted an event marking the brand’s first anniversary. The brand is also sold at the Antonia boutique in Milan.

== Awards and recognition ==
Zangardi has received several industry awards for their work. In 2016, he along with Haenn was named Women’s Stylists of the Year at the Daily Front Row’s Fashion Los Angeles Awards. The duo has been included in The Hollywood Reporter's annual "Most Powerful Stylists" list multiple times. In 2020, the publication also named them on its "Top 10 Power Stylists of the Decade" list.

Zangardi and Haenn were listed among the ambassadors of Fashion Trust U.S., a nonprofit that supports emerging designers through grants and mentorship, and appeared on the organization's 2025 advisory board.
