= Tixtrack =

TixTrack
- Industry: Ticketing
- Founded: 2008
- Founder: Steven Sunshine, Michael Arya
- Headquarters: 1501 Broadway, 14th Floor New York, NY 10036
- Area served: Worldwide
- Key people: Steven Sunshine (CEO), Michael Arya (CRO), Sean Free (COO)

TixTrack, Inc. is a provider of ticket software solutions started in 2008 in the United States. TixTrack's products aim to help ticket sellers increase their ticket sales by providing visual seat level reporting and analysis tools as well as guidance on Dynamic Pricing.

TixTrack's software can work standalone or in conjunction with other ticketing systems, including software from Veritix and Patron Technology.

TixTrack has three types of clients: venues, promoters, and sports teams and is used by more than 100 venues throughout North America.

TixTrack has been issued United States patents for its technology such as venue and inventory visualization, pricing strategy tools and predictive pricing algorithms. US patent 2015100869, "Sports and concert event ticket pricing and visualization system", published 2014-01-28, assigned to TixTrack, Inc.
