= Primary ticket outlet =

Organization directly selling tickets for venue/event owners

A primary ticket outlet is an organization that contracts directly with venues and promoters to sell event tickets on its behalf.

Primary ticket outlets have a direct relationship with the owner of a venue or event. They will often use software to manage the sale of tickets for their clients.

== Booking fees ==
Primary ticket outlets charge a booking fee that is paid by the consumer to help pay for services.

== Examples ==
There are a number of primary ticket outlets around the world including:

- Ticketmaster (owned by Live Nation Entertainment)
- Stage Front
- AXS (owned by Anschutz Entertainment Group)
- See Tickets
- GigsAndTours.com
- SeatGeek
- Zoonga
