= Bp pulse LIVE =

Multipurpose indoor arena in Solihull, England

bp pulse LIVE
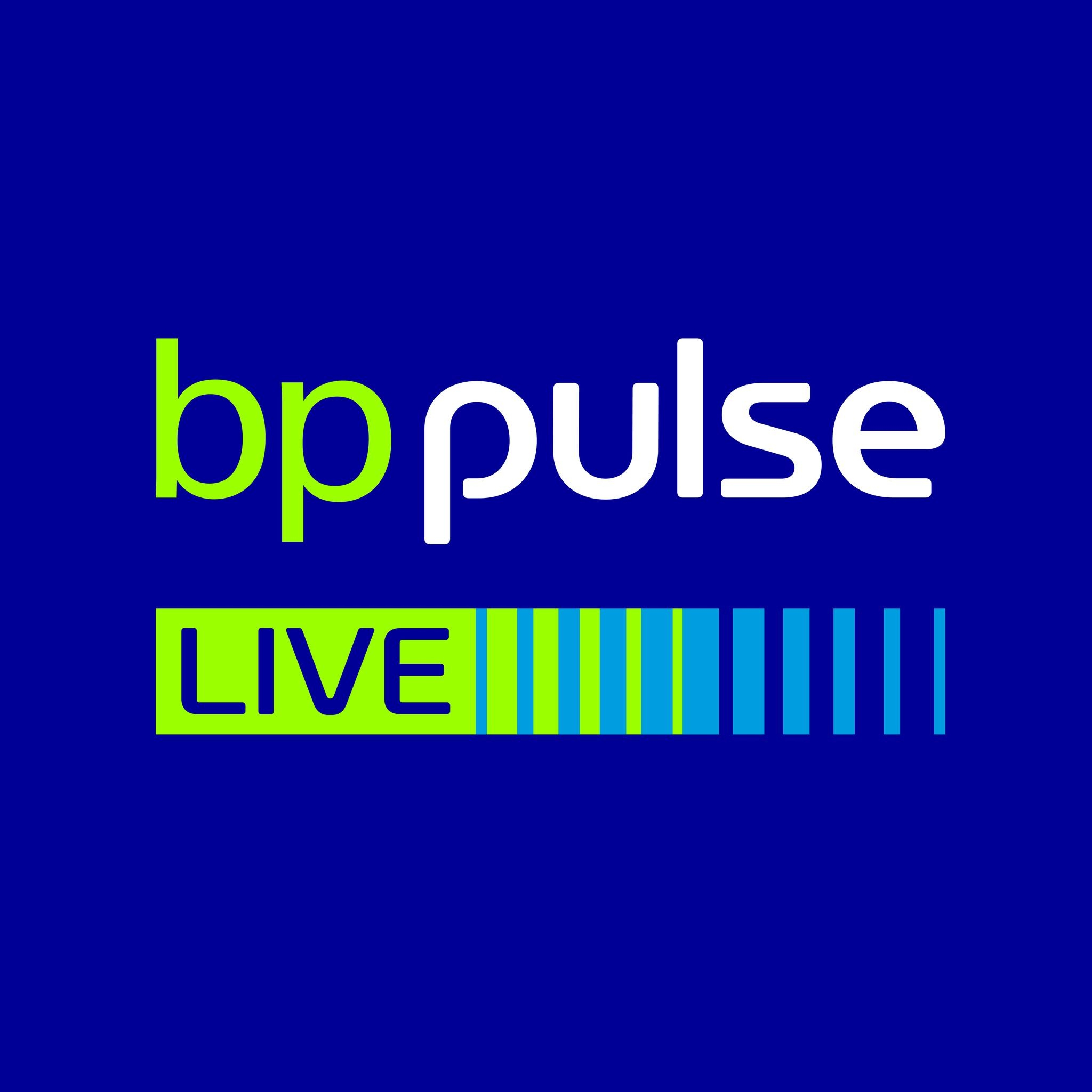

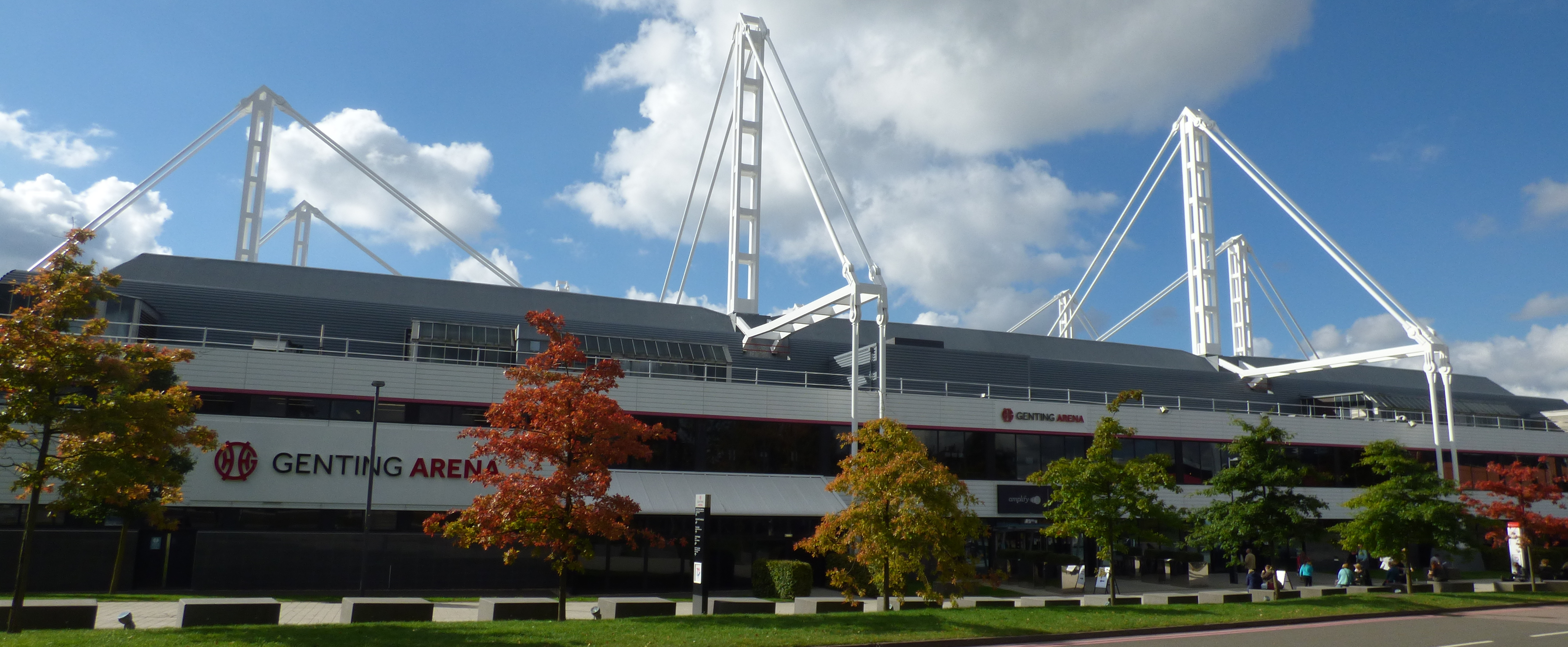
- Exterior of venue under old signage (c.2016)
- Interactive map of bp pulse LIVE
- Full name: bp pulse LIVE
- Former names: Hall 7 (planning/construction); Birmingham International Arena (1980–83); NEC Arena (1983–2008); LG Arena (2008–2015); Genting Arena (2015–2018); Resorts World Arena (2018–2024)
- Address: Perimeter Rd; Birmingham B40 1NT; England
- Location: Marston Green
- Coordinates: 52°27′12″N 1°43′10″W
- Owner: National Exhibition Centre
- Operator: NEC Group
- Capacity: 15,685

Construction
- Groundbreaking: 11 April 1979
- Opened: 5 December 1980
- Renovated: 2008–2009
- Cost: £28 million (renovation)
- Architects: Edward Mills & Partners
- Structural engineer: Ove Arup & Partners

Website
- Venue Website

bp pulse LIVE is a multipurpose indoor arena located at the National Exhibition Centre (NEC) in Solihull, England, just outside Birmingham. It has a capacity of 15,685 seats. The venue was built as the seventh hall of the NEC complex. After 18 months of construction, the arena opened as the Birmingham International Arena in December 1980 with a concert by Queen as part of their Flash Gordon Tour.

In 2019, bp pulse LIVE had the 5th highest ticket sales of an arena venue in the United Kingdom. The Ticket Factory was the official box office for the Resorts World Arena. They would eventually be acquired by American ticket outlet AXS from September 2024 when the arena was rebranded as bp pulse LIVE.

== History ==
LG Arena logo used from 2009–2014.

The venue was known as Birmingham International Arena until 1 September 1983, then as NEC Arena from 5 September 1983 to 31 August 2008.

From 1 September 2008, the NEC Arena was officially renamed as the LG Arena, following a naming-rights sponsorship deal with global electronics company LG. The arena then underwent a £29 million overhaul of its facilities, paid for by loans from Birmingham City Council and regional development agency Advantage West Midlands.

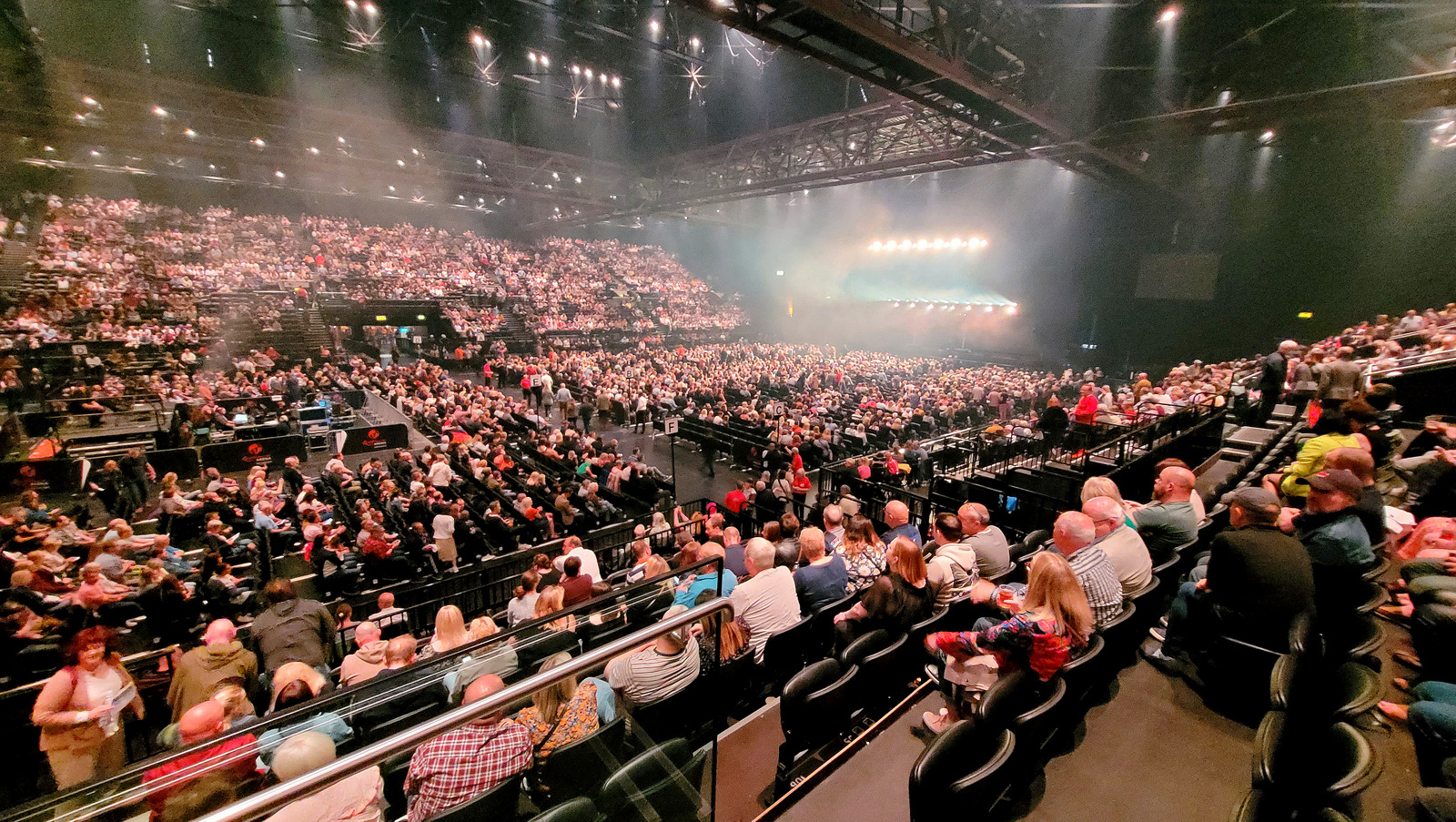
Inside the Resorts World Arena (2022)

Work on the LG Arena was finished mid October 2009 and the arena hosted its first concert with Tom Jones. Included in the installation were around 1,000 new seats, bringing the capacity to 16,000 to compete with venues such as The O2 Arena in London and the Manchester Arena in Manchester. Also constructed were new hospitality areas and a forum containing new bars, restaurants and other customer facilities. Prior to its first concert, the arena hosted the 2009 Horse of the Year show.

In 2011, the venue became the tenth-busiest arena in the world and was ranked 13th-busiest in 2014.

It was announced in November 2014 that as part of a sponsorship deal with the casino group, the arena would be renamed the Genting Arena from 6 January 2015. On 25 September 2018, the NEC Group announced that the Genting Arena will be renamed Resorts World Arena as of 3 December of that year. Genting UK will continue to sponsor the hall. The reason for the new name was to more closely align the venue with Genting's Resorts World Birmingham that is opposite the arena, which opened in October 2015.

On 11 June 2024, it was announced that the name would change to bp pulse LIVE at the start of September 2024, which eventually went live on 1st September 2024. The arena is currently under renovation until November so all the signage and branding with the new name on can be prepared for future events in that month.

=== Planned expansion ===
On 9 March 2020, the NEC Group announced that they had submitted a planning application to Solihull Metropolitan Borough Council to expand the arena's capacity from 15,685 to 21,600, which would have made it the largest indoor arena in the United Kingdom. This development would involve the replacement of the existing roof, with an addition of an upper tier as well as other works including enhanced hospitality facilities as well as external, internal and major refurbishment works. Though unanimously approved by councillors, the plans were put on hold due to the COVID-19 pandemic in the United Kingdom.

== Ticket sales ==
Year	Name	Ticket Sales	Gross Sales (USD)	Worldwide Rank	UK Rank
2019	Resorts World Arena	471,654	31,291,486	43	5
2018	Genting Arena	352,902		51	6
2017	Genting Arena	565,322		26	6
2016	Genting Arena	394,468		35	6
2015	Genting Arena	446,415		27	6

== NEC Group ==
Parent company The NEC Group also owns and operates Utilita Arena Birmingham (previously the National Indoor Arena and Barclaycard Arena) and ICC Birmingham, both in central Birmingham, and the National Exhibition Centre.
