= TicketSource =

Ticketing agent and box office provider

- Company type: Private
- Website type: Ticket sales, event management
- Headquarters: Cardiff, United Kingdom
- Area served: Europe, United States
- Launched: 2004
- Current status: Active

TicketSource Limited is a box-office management system provider based in Penarth, Wales. The company was founded in 2004 by Alex McLauchlan and Simon Wilsher, a theatre enthusiast, to help amateur theatre groups with their online ticket sales and booking. The TicketSource system still supports a free version of the software based on the original offering.

It joined the Society of Ticket Agents and Retailers in 2012. It has sponsored events including the National Rural Touring Awards, the Cardiff Fringe Theatre Festival and Pride Cymru's Big Weekend.

In 2014, the company launched TicketSource in the United States and the Eurozone.

In 2016, The Times included it in a list of companies making excessive charges for credit-card payments.

In 2017, the website had been used by more than 20,000 organizers of events, and was ranked 20th in a list of the 50 fastest-growing companies in Wales.
