= CTS Eventim =

German ticketing and entertainment company

CTS Eventim AG & Co. KGaA
- CTS Eventim logo
- Type: Kommanditgesellschaft auf Aktien with Aktiengesellschaft as general partner
- Traded as: FWB: EVD; MDAX component
- ISIN: DE0005470306
- Industry: Ticketing & Live Entertainment
- Founded: November 4, 1989; 36 years ago in Munich, Germany
- Founders: Marcel Avram, Matthias Hoffmann
- Headquarters: Bremen, Germany
- Key people: Klaus-Peter Schulenberg (CEO); Andreas Grandinger (CFO); Alexander Ruoff (COO)
- Revenue: 2,358,550,000 (2023)
- Operating income: 441,560,000 (2023)
- Net income: 274,640,000 (2023)
- Total assets: 3,195,340,000 (2023)
- Number of employees: 3,733 (2023)
- Parent: KPS-Holding GmbH
- Website: corporate.eventim.de

CTS Eventim is a German company in the leisure-events market, with ticketing and live entertainment, headquartered in Bremen. It is one of the 50 companies comprising the MDAX index.

== History ==
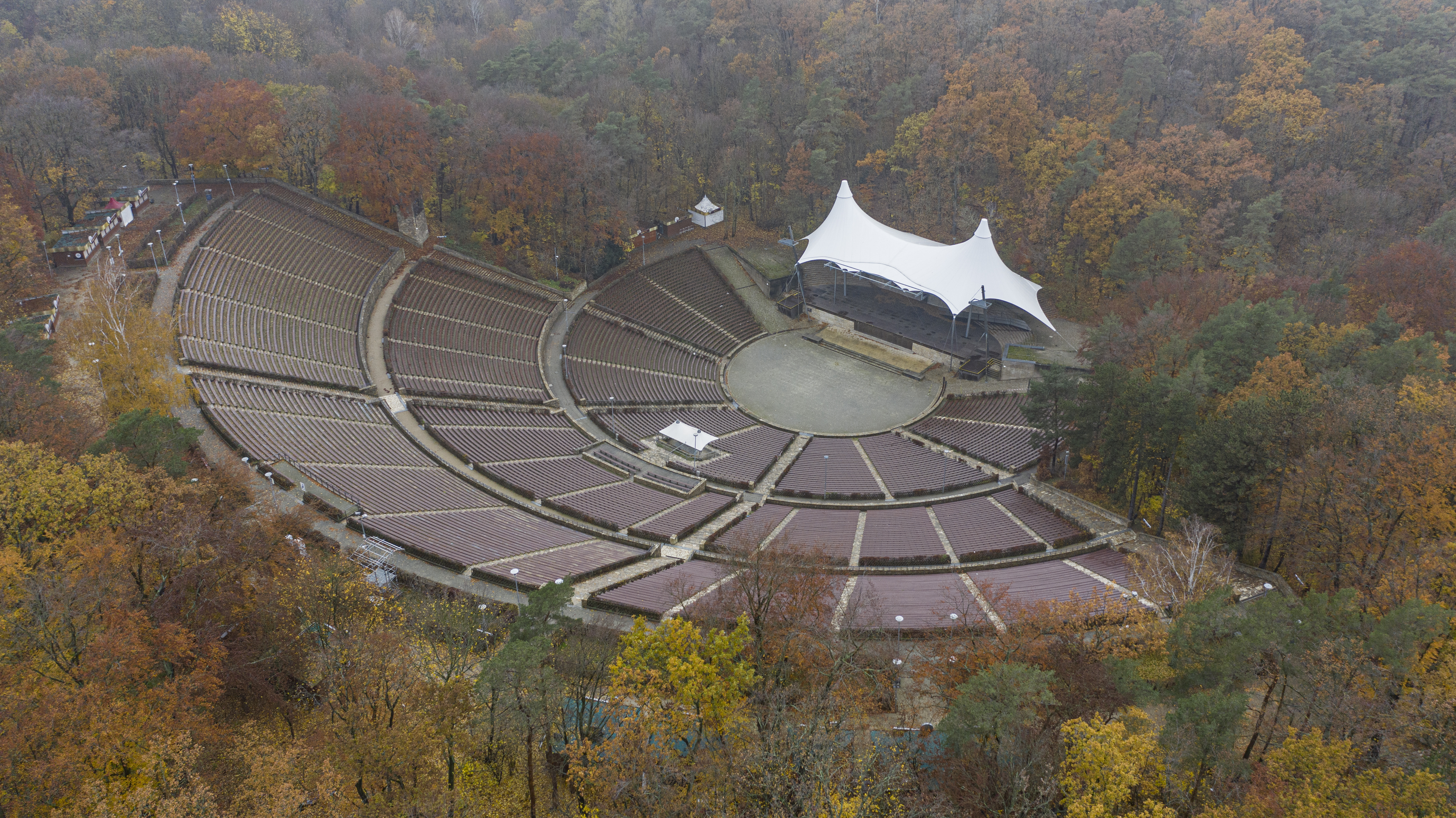
Waldbühne, Berlin

CTS Computer Ticket Service GmbH was founded by Munich-based concert promoters Marcel Avram and Matthias Hoffmann on 4 November 1989. It was acquired in 1996 by Klaus-Peter Schulenberg. Schulenberg took the company partially public on 1 February 2000 on the Frankfurt stock exchange. That same year, the company entered into the live entertainment market with the partial acquisitions of several German concert promoters, such as Marek Lieberberg Konzertagentur, Peter Rieger Konzertagentur, Semmel Concerts, Argo Konzerte, FKP Scorpio, and Dirk Becker Entertainment. Over the years, CTS Eventim would acquire several other ticketing and live entertainment companies, including Austrian promoter Barracuda Music (71% in 2017), Italian promoters Vertigo (51% in 2017) and Friends & Partners (60% in 2017), Holiday on Ice (50% in 2014 followed by a complete acquisition in 2016), Ticket Online (100% in 2010) and Stage Entertainment's remaining ticketing companies in France, Spain and the Netherlands (100% in 2014) and the Italian DI and GI Srl (60% in 2018), company that organizes Lucca Summer Festival, one of the most important Italian music festivals.

Together with other sponsors, CTS Eventim ensured the long-term continuation of the Kontaktstudiengang Popularmusik at the Hochschule für Musik und Theater Hamburg since 2008, now known as Eventim Popkurs.

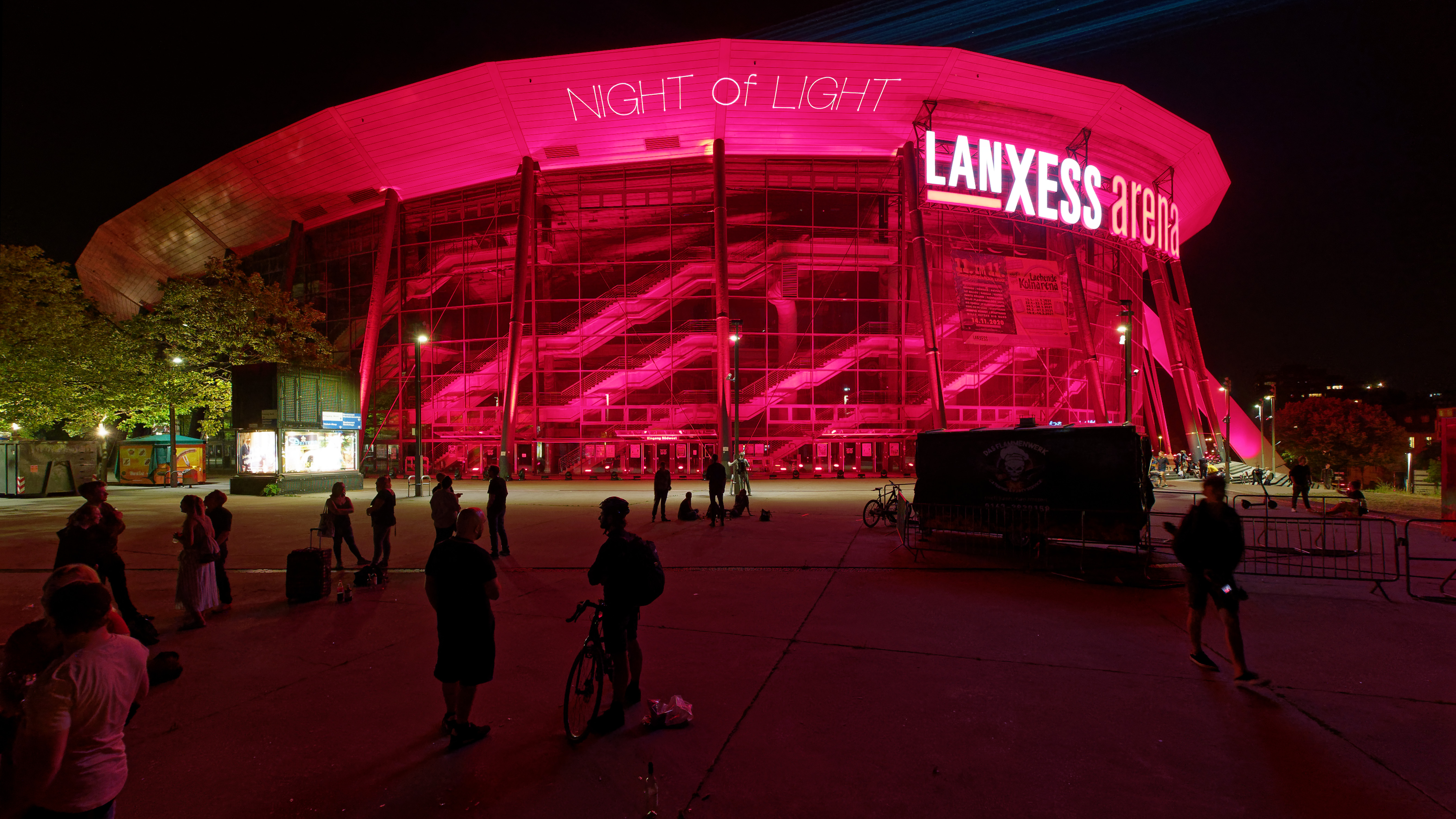
Lanxess Arena, Cologne

In the late 2000's the company started operating several venues, starting with the Waldbühne in Berlin.

The company diversified its ticketing operations in 2015 when it acquired 51% of the German-based Kinoheld, a company that specialises in ticket sales for cinemas. The ownership was raised in 2018 to 100%.

In November 2019, CTS Eventim's revenue exceeded €1 billion for the first time in a nine-month period, and the share price had risen 60% that year to reach a market capitalisation of €5.2 billion.

Eventim France and France Billet merged their French activities in 2019, in the new company Eventim will hold a 48% of the shares with a possibility of raising the ownership in the coming years. The company also merged its Swiss subsidiaries in 2020 with Gadget Entertainment AG and Wepromote Entertainment Group Switzerland AG, taking a 60% share in the new company named Gadget abc Entertainment Group AG.

In February 2020, it was announced that the company would enter the US market via a joint venture with Michael Cohl.

In July 2021, CTS Eventim launched Eventim Live Asia. In August 2021, the company announced plans to construct one of Italy's largest multipurpose arenas, PalaItalia.

== Assets ==
=== Ticketing ===
CTS Eventim (co-)owns several ticketing companies in 21 countries, using various brands. (Note: Eventim, or its subsidiaries, have 100% ownership of the named companies unless noted otherwise)

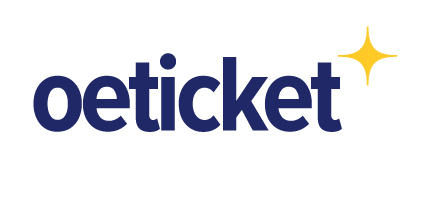
Austrian brand

- Eventim: Germany, Poland, Norway, Sweden, Croatia, Great Britain, Bulgaria, Israel 70%, The Netherlands, Brazil and Slovenia
- Entradas: Spain
- Ticketcorner: Switzerland
- Lippu.fi: Finland
- Billetlugen: Denmark
- TicketOne: Italy 99,7%
- France Billet: France 48%
- See Tickets: United Kingdom
- Oeticket: Austria 86%
  - Eventim: Romania 80%
  - Eventim: Hungary

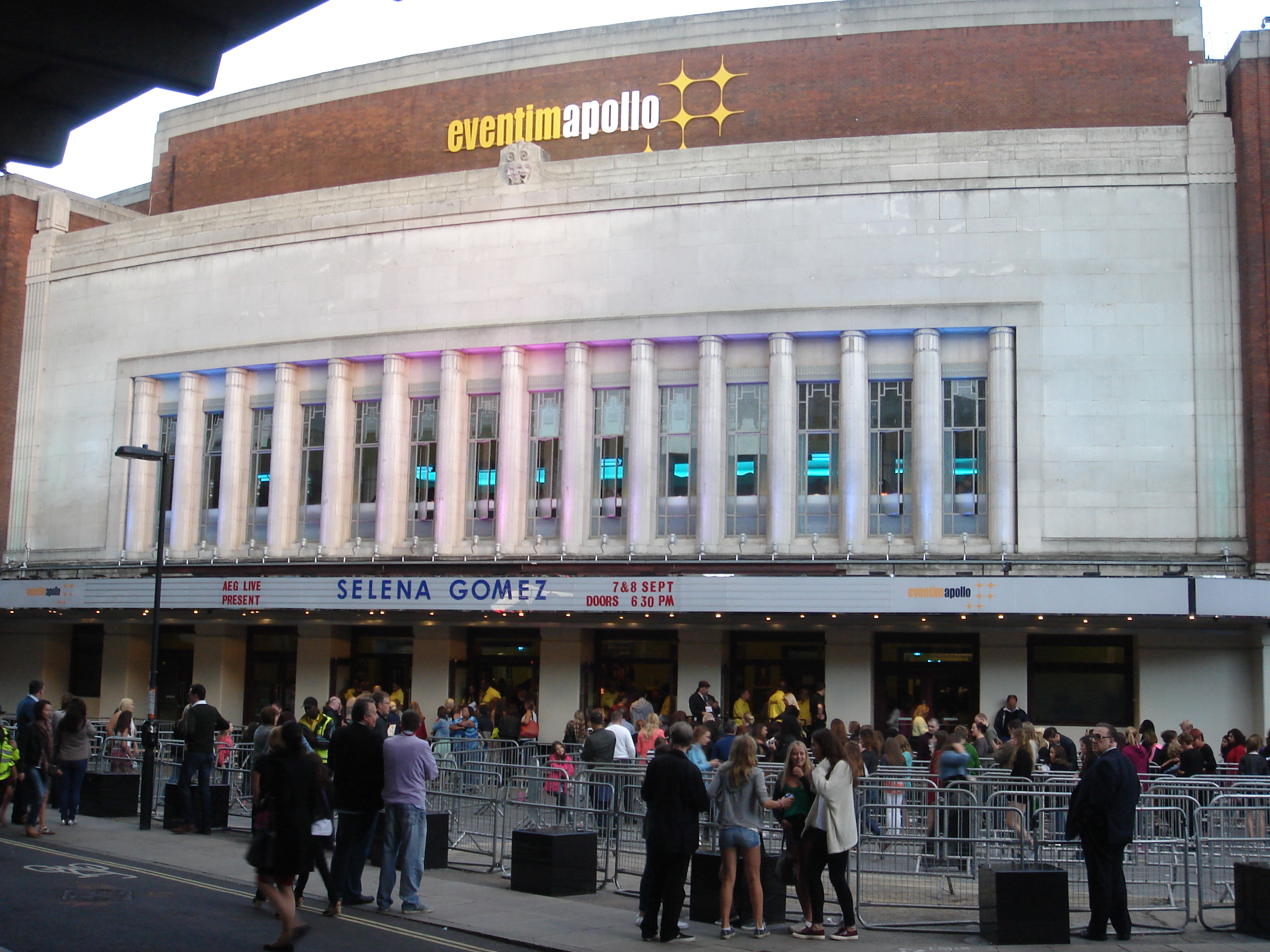
Hammersmith Apollo, London

=== Live entertainment ===
CTS Eventim holds shares in several live entertainment companies via two subsidiaries.

Eventim Live GmbH 94.4%

- FKP Scorpio Konzertproduktionen 50.2%
  - CRP Konzertagentur 50.2%
  - FKP Scorpia
  - FKP Poland
  - ESK Events 50%
  - Friendly Fire
  - FKP Scorpio Nordic 90%
    - FKP Sweden 51%
      - Woah Dad! Live
    - FKP Norway 91%
    - Fullsteam
      - Seinajoki Festivals 65%
  - Palazzo
- Holiday On Ice
- Gadget abc Entertainment Group AG 60%
  - ABC Production
  - Gadget Entertainment
- Eventimpresents
  - Vaddi Concerts
  - Seekers Event 51,1%
  - Promoters Group Munich
    (25.2% via Eventimpresents, 37.4% via Semmel Concerts Entertainment, 37.4% via ARGO Konzerte)
  - Dirk Becker Entertainment 83%
    (10% via Eventimpresents, 73% via Eventim live GmbH)
- Doctor Music Concerts 63.5%
  - In Cow We Trust 60%
- Semmel Concerts Entertainment 50.2%
  - Show Factory Entertainment 51%
- Peter Rieger Konzertagentur
- ARGO Konzerte 50.2%
- All Artists Agency 51%
- ALDA Germany 51%
- Act Entertainment 51%
- Vertigo 51%
- Smash!Bang!Pow!

EVENTIM LIVE INTERNATIONAL GmbH 100%

- Friends & Partners 60%
  - Vivo Concerti 60%
- Barracuda 71%
  - Arcadia Live
- Talent Concert International 51%
- Di&Gi - D'Alesandro e Galli 60%

=== Venues ===
CTS Eventim operates several venues across Europe.

- Waldbühne, Berlin, operated since 2009.
- Lanxess Arena, Cologne, operated since 2012.
- Hammersmith Apollo, London, owned since 2013 for 50%.
- K.B. Hallen, Copenhagen, operated since 2019 for 50%.
