= List of Iron Maiden band members =

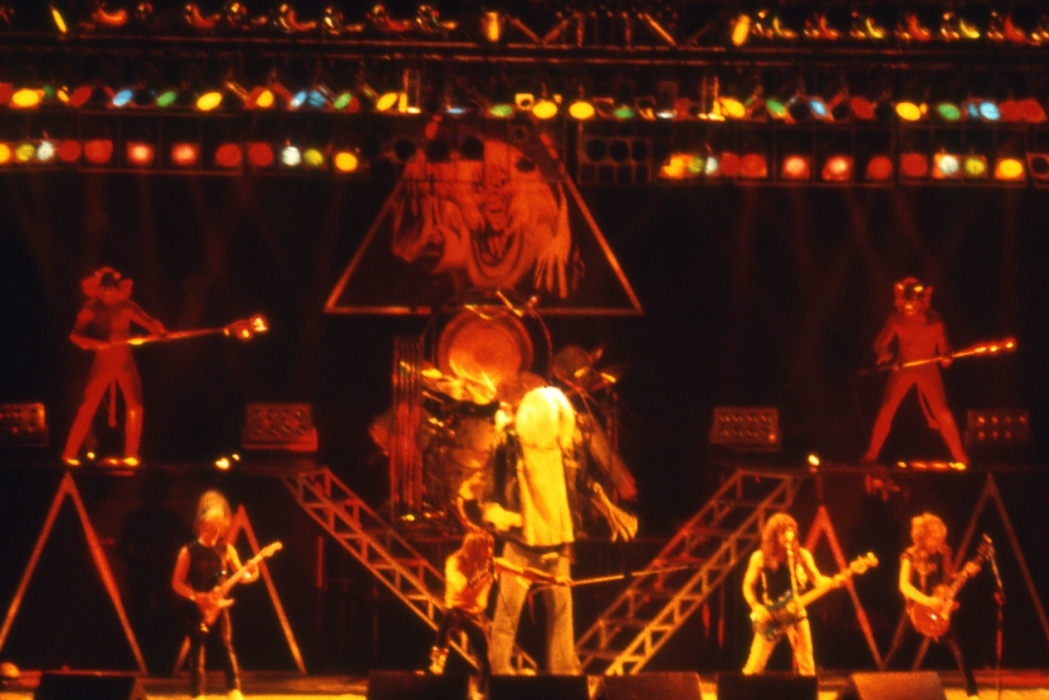
(left to right) Dave Murray, Bruce Dickinson, Steve Harris, Adrian Smith; Clive Burr, not visible, behind the drums

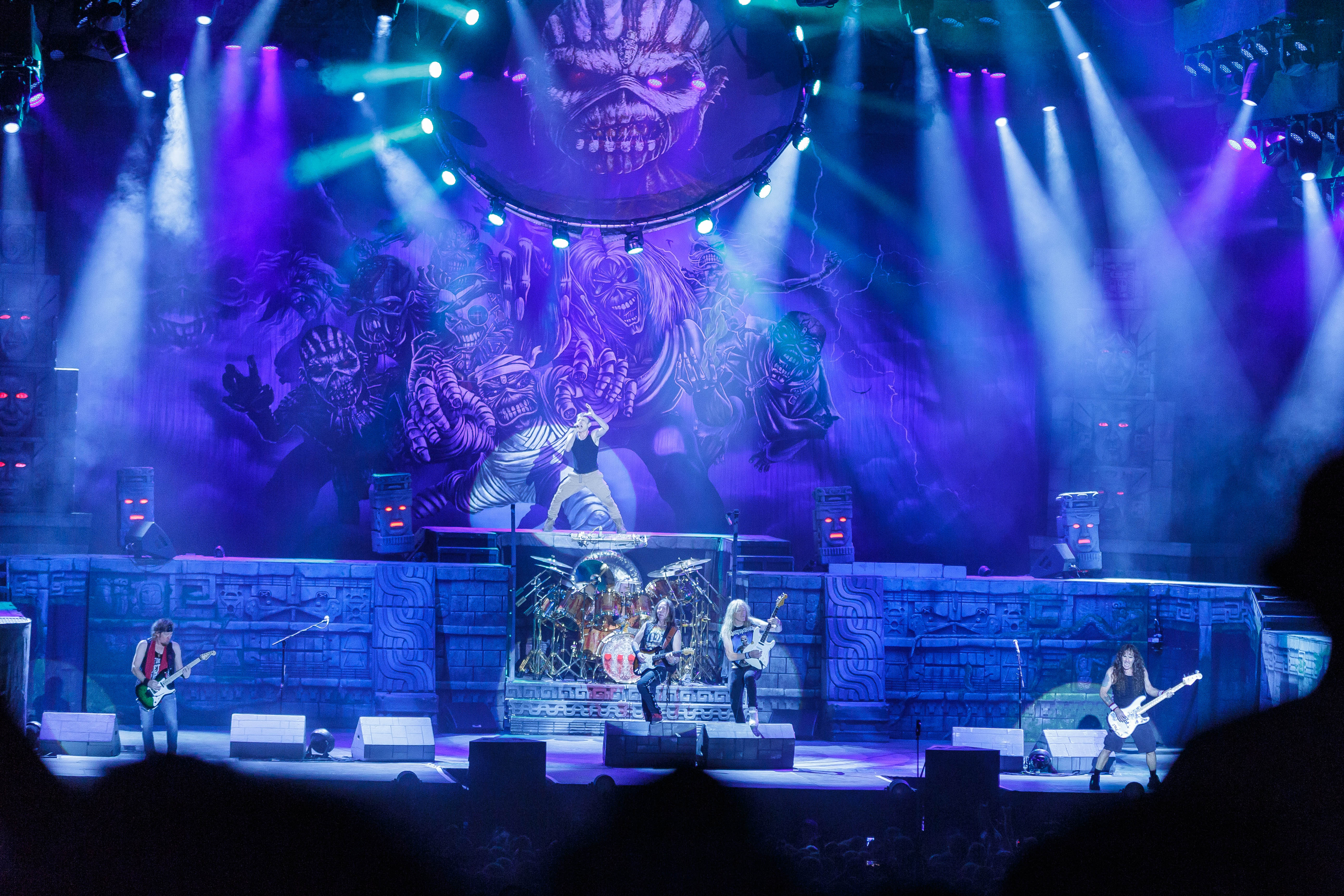
(upper center) Dickinson; (lower row) Smith, Murray, Janick Gers, Steve Harris; Nicko McBrain, behind the drums

Two line-ups of Iron Maiden performing in 1982 and 2016.

Iron Maiden are an English heavy metal band formed in 1975 by bassist Steve Harris. After several lineup changes prior to their recording career, they settled on Harris, vocalist Paul Di'Anno, guitarists Dave Murray and Dennis Stratton and drummer Doug Sampson. The band currently consists of Harris and Murray with guitarist Adrian Smith (who first joined in 1980), vocalist Bruce Dickinson (who first joined in 1981), drummer Nicko McBrain (since 1982; not touring since 2024, replaced live by Simon Dawson from British Lion) and guitarist Janick Gers (since 1990).

== History ==
The band's original line-up in December 1975, included Harris with singer Paul Mario Day, guitarists Terry Rance and Dave Sulivan and drummer Ron Matthews. Day left in October 1976 due to not having enough stage charisma, he was replaced by Dennis Wilcock. Harris temporarily disbanded Iron Maiden in December 1976 so he could replace Rance and Sulivan with guitarists Dave Murray and Bob Sawyer, while retaining Wilcock and Matthews. By mid-1977, Matthews, Murray and Sawyer were all fired after conflicts with either Wilcock or Harris, and replaced by guitarist Terry Wapram and keyboardist Tony Moore and drummer Thunderstick (real name Barry Purkis). This line-up only lasted one show before Moore was fired by Harris, as he felt that keyboards didn't fit in to Iron Maiden's music at the time.

Murray was reinstated in March 1978, after which Wapram left. Wilcock and Thunderstick also left shortly afterwards. The band were quickly joined by Doug Sampson on drums, who Harris had played with before forming Iron Maiden, and began auditioned new singers, settling on Paul Di'Anno joined in November. The band were also joined by second guitarist Paul Cairns in Winter 1978, who played on their 1979 demo The Soundhouse Tapes. Cairns stayed for three months before being dismissed due to not fitting in.

The band were joined by guitarist Paul Todd in June 1979, however he left after a week, not playing any shows due to his girlfriend not letting him. Todd would later join Paul Mario Day's post Iron Maiden band More. Tony Parsons was the bands next guitarist, joining in September 1979, before being dismissed in December due to having less technical ability than Murray, just before the band signed to EMI. He later joined Dennis Wilcock's band Gibraltar.

The band hired Dennis Stratton (guitar, backing vocals). Doug Sampson amicably left the band as he was unable to cope with the touring schedule. At the suggestion of Stratton, Sampson was replaced by Clive Burr, with whom the band recorded their self-titled debut album in 1980. Later that year, Stratton was replaced by Adrian Smith (the band's original choice), due to musical and personal differences brought about by Stratton choosing to travel with the road crew instead of the band on tour.

During the tour supporting their second studio album, Di'Anno was fired from the band after drug and alcohol abuse affected his live performance. Vocalist Bruce Dickinson left his previous band, Samson, which had also included Burr, to audition for Iron Maiden in September 1981 and joined shortly afterwards. After the release of their third album, The Number of the Beast, drummer Nicko McBrain (of support act Trust) replaced Burr, who left due to personal and scheduling problems on the subsequent Beast on the Road tour. This is considered by many as their quintessential lineup, with which they released a series of high-impact works.

In 1990, prior to the recording of their eighth studio album, Smith was asked to leave the band due to a lack of enthusiasm, brought about by the "stripped-down" musical direction they were taking, which Smith considered "a step backwards" from the progressive direction they had been taking. Janick Gers, an old friend of Dickinson's who performed on his debut solo album, became the new guitarist. This formation recorded one more album before Dickinson departed in 1993, in order to pursue his solo career further.

The band listened to hundreds of tapes submitted by vocalists before asking Blaze Bayley to audition, with whom they would go on to release two studio albums, after which Bayley left the band by mutual consent in January 1999. At that point, the band were in talks with Dickinson, who, after a meeting with Steve Harris and Rod Smallwood (the group's manager) in Brighton, agreed to rejoin along with Adrian Smith, who was telephoned a few hours later. Iron Maiden thus became a six-piece band and have gone on to make six further studio releases. This lineup is now the longest and most stable in the band's history.

On 7 December 2024, McBrain announced he was retiring from touring due to health issues following the band's show on that day, but would remain a member of the band. The following day, Simon Dawson of Harris's band British Lion was announced as the band's new touring drummer.

== Members ==
=== Current ===
Image	Name	Years active	Instruments	Release contributions
	Steve Harris	1975–present	bass guitar; backing vocals; keyboards and synthesiser (1986–1988, 1997–2022; studio only)	all Iron Maiden releases
	Dave Murray	1976–1977; 1978–present	guitars; guitar synthesiser (1986; studio only)	all Iron Maiden releases
	Adrian Smith	1980–1990; 1999–present	guitars; backing and occasional lead vocals; synthesiser (1986–1988, 2006; studio only)	all Iron Maiden releases from Killers (1981) to Maiden England (1989); Best of the Beast (1996); all Iron Maiden releases from Brave New World (2000) to present
	Bruce Dickinson	1981–1993; 1999–present	lead vocals; additional guitars (1983–1985); piano (2014; studio only)	all Iron Maiden releases from The Number of the Beast (1982) to Raising Hell (1994); Best of the Beast (1996); all Iron Maiden releases from Brave New World (2000) to present
	Nicko McBrain	1982–present (not touring after 2024)	drums; percussion	all Iron Maiden releases from Piece of Mind (1983) to present
	Janick Gers	1990–present	guitars	all Iron Maiden releases from No Prayer for the Dying (1990) to present

=== Former ===
Image	Name	Years active	Instruments	Release contributions
	Ron (Rebel) Matthews (Note: The band's original drummer Matthews states he was expelled from the band by their second vocalist, Wilcock.)	1975–1977	drums	none
	Terry Rance (Note: As one of the band's original guitarists Rance disagreed on Murray's entrance in the band, taking it as a slight on his own ability. To allow Murray to join Harris temporarily disbanded Iron Maiden in December 1976 and reformed the group soon afterwards without Rance or Dave Sullivan, the band's other original guitarist.)	1975–1976	guitars	none
	Dave Sullivan (Note: According to Sullivan himself, he "wasn't too bothered" with the prospect of Murray joining the group as he understood that "the lead sound was a bit lacking." However along with Rance, Sullivan was not invited to rejoin Iron Maiden when they temporarily disbanded in 1976.)	1975–1976	guitars	none
	Paul Mario Day (Note: Day was the band's original lead vocalist but was the first to leave the group because according to Harris, "he didn't really have enough energy or charisma onstage." Years later being interviewed he claimed the co-authorship of the song "Strange World", which never could be proven.)	1975–1976 (died 2025)	lead vocals	none
	Dennis Wilcock (Note: Wilcock replaced original vocalist Day and was the first to introduce special effects to the band's stage show, including fake blood capsules (placed in his mouth as he'd run a sword across his lips) and face paint. Wilcock convinced Harris to sack most of the band including Murray following a row they had after a show at the Bridgehouse pub, Canning Town in 1977. It was also claimed in The Early Days documentary that Wilcock disliked Murray's girlfriend. Eventually, Wilcock decided he'd had enough with the group and left to form his own band, "V1".)	1976–1978	lead vocals	none
	Bob Sawyer (later Rob Angelo) (Note: Sawyer (who would later go by the name of "Rob Angelo") would always try to upstage Murray, resulting in a confrontation with Harris (and expulsion from the group) after pretending to play guitar with his teeth when the audience could see that it was a trick.)	1977	guitars	none
	Terry Wapram (Note: After Murray's dismissal from the group by Wilcock, Wapram was brought in as his replacement. Having only played in Iron Maiden as the sole guitarist, Wapram was sacked after expressing that he was not content with Murray's reinstatement following Wilcock's departure.)	1977–1978	guitars	none
	Thunderstick (Barry Purkis)	1977–1978	drums	none
	Tony Moore	1977	keyboards	none
	Doug Sampson	1978–1979	drums	The Soundhouse Tapes (1979); Best of the Beast (1996); BBC Archives (2002)
	Paul Di'Anno	1978–1981 (died 2024)	lead vocals	all Iron Maiden releases from The Soundhouse Tapes (1979) to Maiden Japan (1981); Best of the Beast (1996); BBC Archives (2002)
	Paul Cairns (a.k.a. "Mad Mac")	1978–1979	guitars	The Soundhouse Tapes (1979); Best of the Beast (1996)
	Paul Todd	1979	guitars	none
	Tony Parsons	1979	guitars	BBC Archives (2002)
	Clive Burr	1979–1982 (died 2013)	drums	all Iron Maiden releases from Iron Maiden (1980) to The Number of the Beast (1982); Best of the Beast (1996); BBC Archives (2002)
	Dennis Stratton	1979–1980	guitars; backing vocals	Iron Maiden (1980); Live!! +one (1980); Killers (1981); Best of the Beast (1996); BBC Archives (2002)
	Blaze Bayley	1994–1999	lead vocals	The X Factor (1995); Best of the Beast (1996); Virtual XI (1998)

=== Touring and session ===
Image	Name	Years active	Instruments	Notes
	Michael Kenney	1988–2022	keyboards	Since 1980, Kenney was employed by the band as Harris' bass technician. Following Iron Maiden's Seventh Son of a Seventh Son album, in which the band used keyboards for the first time, Harris insisted that Kenney perform the keyboard parts live under the alias of "The Count". Following this tour Kenney provided keyboards on their next four studio albums after which Harris took over playing keys with Kenney assisting. He continued to provide the band's live keyboards, although unlike the Seventh Tour of a Seventh Tour during which he performed on a forklift, Kenney would later play the keys backstage. For the Maiden England World Tour 2012–2013, Kenney reprised his role as "The Count" during performances of the song "Seventh Son of a Seventh Son". On 9 September 2022, he announced on Facebook that he had retired from Iron Maiden.: all Iron Maiden studio releases from No Prayer for the Dying (1990) to Virtual XI (1998), and The Book of Souls (2015); all live releases from Maiden England (1989) to Nights of the Dead (2020)
	Brent Diamond	2022–present	keyboards	From 2022, he replaced Michael Kenney as Steve Harris' bass technician, and as keyboard player during concerts.
	Simon Dawson	2024–present	drums	Dawson, who also known as a drummer for Harris's side-project, British Lion, was announced taking McBrain's place for the band's upcoming tours.

== Line-ups ==
Period	Members	Releases
December 1975 – October 1976	Steve Harris – bass guitar, backing vocals; Ron Matthews – drums; Terry Rance – guitars; Dave Sullivan – guitars; Paul Mario Day – lead vocals	none – live performances only
October 1976 – November 1976	Steve Harris – bass guitar, backing vocals; Ron Matthews – drums; Terry Rance – guitars; Dave Sullivan – guitars; Dennis Wilcock – lead vocals	none – live performances only
December 1976 – mid-1977	Steve Harris – bass guitar, backing vocals; Ron Matthews – drums; Dennis Wilcock – lead vocals; Dave Murray – guitars; Bob Sawyer (a.k.a. Rob Angelo) – guitars	none – live performances only
Mid-1977 – November 1977	Steve Harris – bass guitar, backing vocals; Dennis Wilcock – lead vocals; Thunderstick – drums; Terry Wapram – guitars; Tony Moore – keyboards	none – live performances only
November 1977 – early 1978	Steve Harris – bass guitar, backing vocals; Dennis Wilcock – lead vocals; Thunderstick – drums; Terry Wapram – guitars	none – rehearsals only
March 1978 – April 1978	Steve Harris – bass guitar, backing vocals; Dennis Wilcock – lead vocals; Thunderstick – drums; Dave Murray – guitars	none – rehearsals only
Early 1978 – November 1978 (Note: Mick Wall reports that, following Dennis Wilcock's departure, the band spent six months rehearsing as a three-piece whilst looking for a new lead vocalist.)	Steve Harris – bass guitar, backing vocals; Dave Murray – guitars; Doug Sampson – drums	none – rehearsals only
November 1978 – early 1979	Paul Cairns (a.k.a. "Mad Mac") – guitars; Steve Harris – bass guitar, backing vocals; Dave Murray – guitars; Doug Sampson – drums; Paul Di'Anno – lead vocals	The Soundhouse Tapes (1979)
June 1979	Steve Harris – bass guitar, backing vocals; Dave Murray – guitars; Doug Sampson – drums; Paul Di'Anno – lead vocals; Paul Todd – guitars	none – rehearsals only
September – December 1979	Steve Harris – bass guitar, backing vocals; Dave Murray – guitars; Doug Sampson – drums; Paul Di'Anno – lead vocals; Tony Parsons – guitars	none – live performances only
December 1979 – November 1980	Steve Harris – bass guitar, backing vocals; Dave Murray – guitars; Paul Di'Anno – lead vocals; Clive Burr – drums; Dennis Stratton – guitars, backing vocals	Iron Maiden (1980)
November 1980 – September 1981	Steve Harris – bass guitar, backing vocals; Dave Murray – guitars; Paul Di'Anno – lead vocals; Clive Burr – drums; Adrian Smith – guitars, backing vocals	Killers (1981)
September 1981 – December 1982	Steve Harris – bass guitar, backing vocals; Dave Murray – guitars; Clive Burr – drums; Adrian Smith – guitars, backing vocals; Bruce Dickinson – lead vocals	The Number of the Beast (1982)
December 1982 – June 1990	Steve Harris – bass guitar, backing vocals, synthesiser (1986–1988); Dave Murray – guitars, guitar synthesiser (1986); Adrian Smith – guitars, backing vocals, synthesiser (1986–1988); Bruce Dickinson – lead vocals, additional guitars (1983–1985); Nicko McBrain – drums, percussion	Piece of Mind (1983); Powerslave (1984); Somewhere in Time (1986); Seventh Son of a Seventh Son (1988)
June 1990 – August 1993	Steve Harris – bass guitar, backing vocals; Dave Murray – guitars; Bruce Dickinson – lead vocals; Nicko McBrain – drums, percussion; Janick Gers – guitars	No Prayer for the Dying (1990); Fear of the Dark (1992)
January 1994 – January 1999	Steve Harris – bass guitar, backing vocals, keyboards; Dave Murray – guitars; Nicko McBrain – drums, percussion; Janick Gers – guitars; Blaze Bayley – lead vocals	The X Factor (1995); Virtual XI (1998)
January 1999 – present	Steve Harris – bass guitar, backing vocals, keyboards; Dave Murray – guitars; Nicko McBrain – drums, percussion (not touring since 2024); Janick Gers – guitars; Adrian Smith – guitars, backing vocals, synthesiser (2006); Bruce Dickinson – lead vocals, piano (2014)	Brave New World (2000); Dance of Death (2003); A Matter of Life and Death (2006); The Final Frontier (2010); The Book of Souls (2015); Senjutsu (2021)
