= Tony Moore's AWAKE =

AWAKE is an original one-man show based around a concept album that was written and recorded in 2021 by singer/songwriter Tony Moore. Although the album has not been officially released yet (it's available for download only on bandcamp.com at present) it will be coming out on all digital media on October 11, 2024.

There have been over 150 performances of the live experience so far including a very successful UK tour in early 2024 plus a show at The Royal Albert Hall in London in May.

In January 2024, Tony reunited with former bandmate Steve Harris from Iron Maiden when Tony took his show ‘AWAKE” on the road, for a month, to open for British Lion the other band Steve plays, records and tours with.

In July 2024, Tony played alongside British Lion at The Faro Moto Fest in Portugal and Spain for a separate performance.

At the end of August 2024, Tony joined British Lion as support for their world tour in Australia, New Zealand, Japan, and North America. After the British Lion tour, Tony will continue with the AWAKE Headline line tour throughout North America.
