= Tony Moore (musician) =

Musical artist (b. 1958)

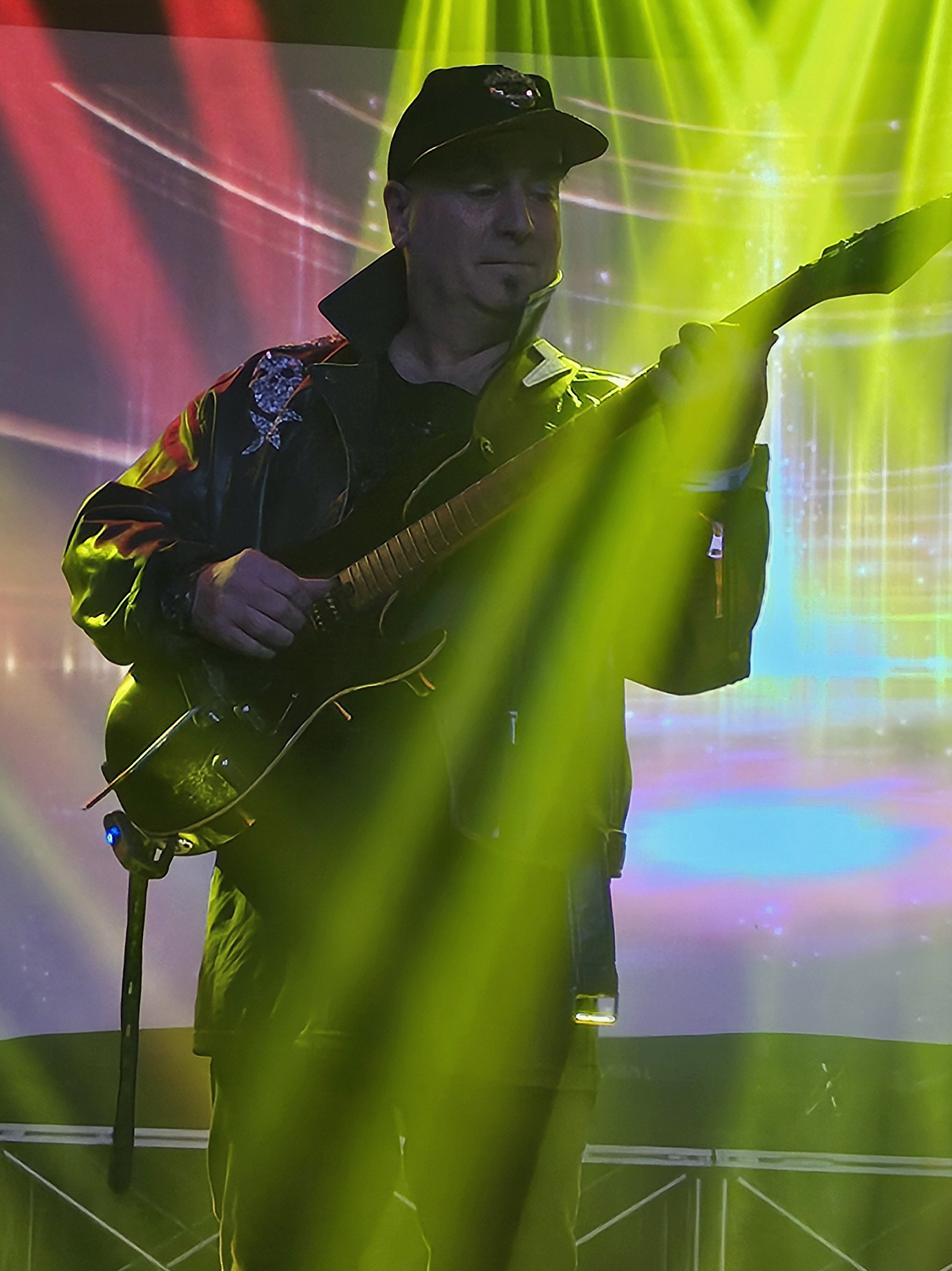
- Moore in Bogota, Colombia (2024)

Background information
- Born: October 11, 1958 (age 67)
- Occupations: Singer; songwriter; musician; music promoter
- Instruments: Keyboards; guitar; vocals
- Formerly of: Iron Maiden; Cutting Crew
- Website: tonymooremusic.com

Antony Moore (born 11 October 1958) is an English singer-songwriter, musician, and music promoter. He was a member of Iron Maiden in the late 1970s prior to the release of their first album. In 1986 he was the keyboard player with the band Cutting Crew who went on to have a worldwide hit with "(I Just) Died in Your Arms", and founded The Kashmir Klub in 1997 to showcase live music in London.

== Musical career ==
=== Iron Maiden ===
Tony Moore's background in the music industry has been eclectic and diverse. The first band he joined in 1977 was (the then unknown) Iron Maiden. A fan of progressive rock, Moore was working in the Hi-Fi department of Debenhams store in Bristol, and had just bought a small Korg synthesiser when he saw an advertisement in the Melody Maker for a keyboard player for a London band. This turned out to be Iron Maiden. He contacted Steve Harris (who shared a fondness for progressive rock), then auditioned and was invited to join the band. He moved to London to begin rehearsals. At that time members of the band all had day jobs and rehearsed once or twice a week. As this was the height of the pub rock era, their first gig with the new line-up was at a pub called The Bridge House in Canning Town.

In Moore's own words:

The whole gig was a bit of a blur (as live performances often are). The adrenaline, the nerves, the concentration all played their part to produce a misty memory of the event.

However, I think it is right to say, everyone felt there was something fundamentally not right in what was happening. For my part, I felt that the whole show felt a little pub rock. I didn't think that my contribution was actually enhancing the band.

In many ways it was an important bad gig. I think that, had the gig gone well, we may have struggled on with that lineup when, in hindsight, it was so obviously wrong.

The following weeks produced a sense of unrest within the band and a feeling that things were unspoken and resentments and frustrations were being suppressed just below the surface. I remember the last rehearsal I had with the group, in a railway arch midway between Elephant and Castle and Blackfriars Bridge, where things seemed strained and un-natural.

I think I realised at that point, that the band didn't really need a keyboard player. No matter how much I liked and respected Steve's dream, and passion and energy, I didn't seem to fit in.

Moore decided to leave to join Tanz Der Youth soon afterwards, as he felt keyboards did not suit the sound Iron Maiden were looking for at the time. Iron Maiden would later use keyboards to enhance the more progressive direction the band took on in the late 1980s, with keyboards featured on every album since 1988, played at various times by Steve Harris, guitarist Adrian Smith, and bass tech Michael Kenny. In Tanz Der Youth, he began working with Brian James (from The Damned) releasing the single "I'm Sorry, I'm Sorry" on RADAR Records, touring in support for Black Sabbath and The Stranglers, before moving on to join a progressive rock band called England. In the early 1980s, he formed his own group called Radio Java and made an album at Abbey Road Studios that spawned a number-one hit single in the Netherlands, before disbanding after the label closed down.

=== Cutting Crew ===
In 1986, Moore was invited to play keyboards with a new band called Cutting Crew who went on to have a worldwide hit with "(I Just) Died in Your Arms". For two more years he toured the world and recorded with the band, at which point he signed a solo deal with a small independent label in London. He released one single to critical acclaim (including airplay from Bob Harris) before joining forces with Argentine singer-songwriter Marie Claire D'ubaldo. He co-wrote and co-produced tracks for her debut album on Polydor, which sold over 250,000 copies worldwide.

=== A Song For Europe ===
In 2001, Moore performed his own composition, "That's My Love" in the A Song For Europe contest, hoping to represent the UK in the Eurovision Song Contest. He finished second in the competition, behind Lindsay Dracass.

He had written other songs for the contest in earlier years; "A Little Bit of Heaven" performed by Lorraine Craig in 1991, "Waiting in the Wings" performed by internally selected Frances Ruffelle in 1994 and both of Catherine Porter's entries ("The Answer" and "Crazy") in 2000.

=== Perfect and Beautiful ===
In 2005, after several years concentrating on club management, Moore resumed his solo musical career and began recording his own material independently. He announced his intention to produce an album, with almost no budget, no major record company backing and only nine days to record, mix and master the final product. This resulted in a 13-track solo album entitled Perfect and Beautiful, recorded at Sphere Studios in London, released in July 2005.

=== Later years ===
In March 2006, Moore toured America, performing in Nashville, Austin, Los Angeles and New York and has continued to perform live on his return to the UK in April 2006.

More recently, Moore has been touring acoustically in pubs all over the Home Counties. He also performs regularly at The Bedford, Balham and The Camden Club in Chalk Farm.

Early in 2008, Moore became the regular presenter of a one-hour live show called Let's Talk Music for the Maltese television station One TV. Broadcast every Thursday night at 8.35 pm (Maltese time), it featured a panel of music professionals who discussed different aspects of the music business and answered questions from the audience, together with live performances by celebrity guests. He also had a regular Thursday morning preview slot on the show One Breakfast.

In October 2010, Moore was presented with a BASCA Gold Badge Award for his unique contribution to music.

On June 30th 2019, Tony Moore performed his composition “We Are The Light” at the closing ceremony of the European Games 2019 in Belarus. The song was written to honour the 8000 volunteers who helped host the Euro Games in Minsk 2019.

In May of 2021 Tony unveiled a unique live experience called AWAKE that is a one man show based on a concept album that he wrote and recorded during the lockdown in February and March of 2021. Initially performing a residency every month at The Bedford in Balham, the show has gained a large cult following and he is now taking it to venues all around the UK with plans to take it to the USA in 2024 after supporting British Lion (with Steve Harris from Iron Maiden on bass) on their sold out UK tour in January 2024.

In 2022, Tony Moore co-wrote and played piano on a song called Love Never Dies, that features on Jude, the seventh studio album by singer/songwriter Julian Lennon.

In January 2024, Tony reunited with former bandmate Steve Harris from Iron Maiden when Tony took his show "AWAKE" on the road, for a month, to open for British Lion the other band Steve plays, records and tours with.

== Club management ==
In 1997, he established The Kashmir Klub in London. The formula of providing an excellent sound system, sourcing the best of emerging and established artists, hosting the show – like live TV – and getting everyone to perform in an acoustic and "back to basics" format, quickly made it into one of the most important live music venues in London. Over its seven-year history Moore introduced debut London performances from Damien Rice, Tom Baxter, Lucie Silvas, and KT Tunstall as well as unannounced sets from Sheryl Crow, Dave Stewart, Fleetwood Mac, Nik Kershaw, Rick Astley and many more. The Kashmir closed in 2003 after the building was closed for re-development.

In July 2003, he took over the management of music nights at The Bedford in Balham, creating a similar live music venue, with an emphasis on emerging talent as well as established acts. It won Best Pub in the country in 2004, and has twice won the best pub and club award as well as the Evening Standard pub of the year. Moore was one of the first promoters to pioneer the use of the Internet and the regular live performances at The Bedford are freely available to all four nights a week, via a dedicated webcam and chatroom.

From 2003 to 2005, Moore co-presented an overnight show on BBC London 94.9 FM where he brought live music guests into the studio and championed the cause of new talent.

In 2004, he was made the sole Inductee into the MMF (Music Managers Forum) Roll of Honour for outstanding contribution to the British Music Industry.

In 2006, he started to collaborate with Quirky Motion on the weekly Bedford Bandstand music program, which he presented. Each show set out to bring a new artist to a wider audience. These episodes are freely available both as a podcast and on YouTube.

Tony Moore opened an additional live acoustic venue, The Regal Room, in December 2006, based at The Distillers, 64, Fulham Palace Road, Hammersmith, London. Showcasing up-and-coming artists, this is run along the same lines as the Kashmir Klub and The Bedford, with free entry and live webcasts.

The Regal Room closed in 2018.

Moore helped launch a new venue in Chalk Farm called The Camden Club along with owner Andrew Hart in 2022, focussing on new and emerging talent.
