= Paul Todd =

Paul Todd may refer to:

- Paul Todd (footballer) (1920–2000), English footballer and manager
- Paul H. Todd Jr. (1921–2008), American politician
- Paul Todd (cricketer) (born 1953), English cricketer
- Paul Todd, guitarist with Iron Maiden in 1979
