= Omens (Sorrowful Angels album) =

Studio album by Sorrowful Angels
- Released: January 2012
- Recorded: CFN Recordings Studio, Athens, Greece. October–December 2011
- Genre: Gothic metal
- Length: 49:27
- Label: Warner Bros. Records
- Producer: Dion Christodoulatos

Sorrowful Angels chronology
Ship in Your Trip (2009)	Omens (2012)	Remedie (2015)

Professional ratings
Review scores
Source	Rating
Rockoverdose	8.5/10 stars

Omens is the second album of the band Sorrowful Angels. It was recorded between October and December 2012. All music and lyrics are credited to Dion Christodoulatos.

== Track listing ==
No.	Title	Length
1.	"Mistress of Desire"	4:33
2.	"Unspeakable Cult"	5:05
3.	"Wrath"	5:10
4.	"Omens"	3:42
5.	"Shores of Capture"	4:09
6.	"Right of Way"	4:58
7.	"Mystical Momentum"	5:45
8.	"Seven"	3:23
9.	"Nous Undue"	3:47
10.	"Mourn (Apoptygma Berzerk)"	3:44
11.	"Stars Collide"	5:11

== Credits ==
=== Sorrowful Angels ===
- Dion Christodoulatos – vocals, lead guitar, music and lyrics
- Apollwn Siakandaris – rhythm guitar
- George Moudaneas – bass guitar
- Fivos Andriopoulos – drums

=== Production ===
- Dion Christodoulatos – production, mixing

=== Artwork ===
- Themis "Fad" Ioannou – album artwork and photography
