= Beast over Hammersmith =

Live album by Iron Maiden
- Released: 4 November 2002
- Recorded: 20 March 1982
- Venue: Hammersmith Odeon, London
- Genre: Heavy metal
- Length: 95:31
- Label: EMI
- Producer: Doug Hall; Steve Harris

Iron Maiden chronology
BBC Archives (2002)	Beast over Hammersmith (2002)	Best of the 'B' Sides (2002)

Beast over Hammersmith is a live album by the English heavy metal band Iron Maiden, released on 4 November 2002. Recorded 20 years previously, during The Beast on the Road tour at the Hammersmith Odeon, the footage was specially co-produced and mixed by Steve Harris and Doug Hall to be a part of the Eddie's Archive box set. Even though this album contains material from The Number of the Beast, it was actually recorded two days prior to its release, although "Run to the Hills" had already been released as a single. The album became officially available for the first time on vinyl as part of the Number of the Beast 40th anniversary special edition on 18 November 2022.

An abridged video version of the concert is included on the first disc of the 2004 DVD, The History of Iron Maiden – Part 1: The Early Days. Intended to be released on VHS around the time of its recording, the band withheld the footage as they were unhappy with its visual quality due to lighting difficulties during the show.

This was the last Iron Maiden release to feature cover illustration by longtime artist Derek Riggs, although it was originally a promotional release from their 1982 tour The Beast on the Road (BBC Archives was the last one with an original illustration).

== Track listing ==
All tracks are written by Steve Harris, except where noted.

Disc one
No.	Title	Writer(s)	Length
1.	"Murders in the Rue Morgue"		4:32
2.	"Wrathchild"		3:31
3.	"Run to the Hills"		4:20
4.	"Children of the Damned"		4:38
5.	"The Number of the Beast"		5:08
6.	"Another Life"		3:45
7.	"Killers"	Harris; Paul Di'Anno	5:47
8.	"22 Acacia Avenue"	Harris; Adrian Smith	6:56
9.	"Total Eclipse"	Harris; Dave Murray; Clive Burr	4:14
Total length:			42:51

Disc two
No.	Title	Writer(s)	Length
1.	"Transylvania"		5:51
2.	"The Prisoner"	Smith; Harris	5:49
3.	"Hallowed Be Thy Name"		7:31
4.	"Phantom of the Opera"		6:53
5.	"Iron Maiden"		4:20
6.	"Sanctuary"	Harris; Murray; Di'Anno	4:13
7.	"Drifter"		9:19
8.	"Running Free"	Harris; Di'Anno	3:44
9.	"Prowler"		5:00
Total length:			52:40

== Credits ==
Production and performance credits are adapted from the album liner notes.

Iron Maiden

- Dave Murray – guitar
- Bruce Dickinson – vocals
- Clive Burr – drums
- Steve Harris – bass guitar, co-producer
- Adrian Smith – guitar

Production

- Doug Hall – co-producer, mixing, engineering
- Nick Watson – mastering
- Derek Riggs – programme design (cover illustration)
- Ross Halfin – photography
- Piergiorgio Brunelli – photography
- G. Schafer – photography
- Toshi Yajima – photography
- Andre Csillag – photography
- Paul Bertie – photography
- Rod Smallwood – photography

== Charts ==
Chart performance for The Number of the Beast + Beast over Hammersmith
Chart (2022)	Peak position
Swedish Albums (Sverigetopplistan)	51
Scottish Albums (OCC)	18
UK Rock & Metal Albums (OCC)	4
