= Löanshark =

Spanish metal band

Löanshark is a Spanish heavy metal band. They have released one album.

The band was founded in Barcelona in 2017. In 2024 they signed with Rock of Angels Records.

== Discography ==
- The Warning Sessions (EP, 2018)
- The Gangland Tapes (compilation, 2021)
- No Sins to Confess (album, 2025)
