= Chania Rock Festival =

Rock festival held in Chania, Greece

- Genre: Metal
- Dates: July - August
- Locations: San Salvatore Port (Chania Old Harbour), Chania, Greece
- Years active: 2002–present
- Website: http://www.chaniarockfestival.gr

Chania Rock Festival is a rock festival held in Chania, Greece. The festival's history begins back in 2002. It is located right in the middle of the old city of Chania, next to the famous old port of the city. It is an old Venetian Bastion facing the sea.

== 2017 lineup ==
Friday 30 June	Suturday 31 June
Blind Guardian; Septic Flesh; Sailing to Nowhere; SLTheory; Upon Revival	Warlord; Phil Campbell and the Bastard Sons; Innerwish; Eversin; Hemingways

== 2016 lineup ==
Saturday 16 July	Sunday 17 July
Therapy? Rotting Christ; Cutting Crew; Praying Mantis; Diviner	Kreator; Tyketto; Mystic Prophecy; Crazy Lixx; Exarsis

== 2015 lineup ==
Chania Stage
Friday 17 July	Saturday 18 July
Soulfly; D-A-D; Bonfire; Bang Out	Sabaton; Gus G Flotsam and Jetsam; Rublood

Rock Stage
Friday 17 July	Saturday 18 July
Warrel Dane; Doomocracy; Coretheband	Wotan; Skandal; 1000Dead

== 2014 lineup ==
Saturday 9 August

Destruction
Blaze Bayley
Battleroar
Chronoshpere
Forsaken Memoriam
Coretheband

== 2013 lineup ==
Sunday 25 August

Planet of Zeus
Crucified Barbara
Master Reset
Everfailed
Weird Totem
Skandal

== 2012 lineup ==
Sunday 26 August

Grave Digger
Lucky Funeral
Winter Crescent
Obzerv
Menace
Collapse from Inside

== 2011 lineup ==
Wednesday 24 August

Rotting Christ
Nightstalker
Ανώριμοι
Industry of Nightmares
Playgrounded
Timeriver
Harry Dirty Guitar

== 2010 lineup ==
Thursday 5 August	Friday 6 August
The Last Drive; Poem; Universe217; Planet of Zeus; Roundabout	W.A.S.P. Orange Goblin; Spitfire; ΔΕΜΑΞΗΜΑΜ; Drunkstards

== 2009 lineup ==
Saturday 8 August

Anathema
Rotting Christ
Pilgrim
Soundgeist
Playgrounded
Everfailed

== 2008 lineup ==
Sunday 24 August

Paradise Lost
Real Fiction
Roundabout
Dead June
Soundtrap
After the Rot

== 2002 lineup ==
Saturday 17 August

U.D.O.
Anathema
Valley's Eve
Deviser
InnerWish
Sorrowful Angels
