= Power Paladin =

Icelandic metal band

Power Paladin is an Icelandic power metal band. They have released two albums.

== Select discography ==
- With the Magic of Windfyre Steel (2022, Atomic Fire Records)
- Beyond the Reach of Enchantment (2026, Rock of Angels Records)
