= Doug Sampson =

British drummer (born 1957)

- Born: 30 June 1957 (age 69); Hackney, London, England
- Genres: Heavy metal
- Occupation: Drummer
- Years active: 1975–1979, 2016–present
- Member of: Airforce
- Formerly of: Iron Maiden; Smiler; Janski

Douglas William Sampson (born 30 June 1957) is an English musician. He was the drummer for Iron Maiden from 1978 to 1979.

== Biography ==
Prior to joining Iron Maiden, Sampson was a member of one of Steve Harris' previous groups, Smiler, along with Dennis Wilcock, Mick Clee (born 1949) and Tony Clee (b. 1949) in 1975, after which he was asked to join Iron Maiden at their inception in the same year. He declined to join at the time as he was "a bit fed up with the whole rock band thing" because he was "completely skint," but accepted a further invitation from Steve Harris at Dennis Willcock's last gig to replace Barry Purkis in 1978 after he had taken up drumming again in a Southern Rock group called Janski.

Following a year of rehearsing, the band began playing small pubs during which they gained a large following, a highlight being a gig at London's famous Marquee club. Doug participated in the recording of Iron Maiden's demo, later released as The Soundhouse Tapes, on 31 December 1978, Prowler and other tracks from it appeared in the charts of Neal Kay's Heavy Metal Soundhouse club, published weekly in Sounds. Iron Maiden eventually signed to EMI in 1979, following up by recording further demos, one song from these sessions ("Burning Ambition") was included on the B-Side of "Running Free".

Sampson also played on Iron Maiden's BBC Archives released in November 2002 as part of the Eddie's Archive box set. It is a collection of songs from three live shows and one live radio broadcast, recorded by the BBC between 1979 and 1988. Sampson can be found on the BBC Radio 1 Friday Rock Show, 14 November 1979 disc.

Sampson eventually left the band on 22 December 1979, following health issues brought about by the band's extensive touring schedule driving up and down the country in vans at night in a hectic schedule freezing half to death in the van and a lack of sleep contributing to fatigue and illness. Although he calls leaving Maiden "a blow," he states that "After leaving Iron Maiden he had a jam with Chop Pitman and Tony Hatton from EL34 and they formed a new band, Airforce, when joined by Sam Sampson, Doug's brother who was the vocalist from local legends Sam's Apple Pie. Airforce played heavily in the London circuit including nights including the Ruskin Arms and the Marquee supporting Shy."

On June 8th 2015, Doug Sampson was invited to the releaseparty of the Origins Of Iron compilation album, which featured nine tracks by former members of Iron Maiden, on which his former band Airforce contributed a track "War Games". At first, he declined because he wasn't sure if people were waiting for him to get out in public again. His former bandmates Chop Pitman and Tony Hatton persuaded him to come and overwhelmed by the reception of all the Iron maiden fans and ex-members that were there that night he and Tony decided to rejoin Airforce again after a 20 years absence. Also in 2015, Sampson was invited to be a guest at The Legacy Projects charity fund raising gig supported many former members of Iron Maiden. Sampson brought down his Smiler drum kit that he also used in Iron Maiden and was swamped for autographs and photos, Sampson's old band, Airforce performed a set. He recorded three new tracks with the band and released their career-retrospective album, Judgement Day on 15 July 2016 via WatchOut Records.

Sampson finally returned to the stage, in April 2017. At just his second show back with Airforce, the band headlined the inaugural "Burr Fest" event, at The Lounge, in London. The event raised money for the MS Action Fund, in memory of Sampson's Iron Maiden successor, Clive Burr.

Airforce have recorded a new EP The Black Box Recordings: Volume 1, which was released on 21 July 2017. The EP was the first material to feature the reunited trio of Chop Pitman, Tony Hatton, and Doug Sampson, with new vocalist Dilian Arnaudov.

The band then recorded The Black Box Recordings: Volume 2, a Special Soundhouse Edition of the EP featuring a rough mix and featuring Sampson's old Iron Maiden bandmate Paul Di'Anno, as a special guest vocalist on the track "Sniper" got its first public airing at the Born Again Heavy Metal Sound House event on 22 December in London.

Sampson and Airforce will be recording an as yet untitled album in 2018 and can be found performing home and abroad in 2018.

In 2024, Airforce announced that they would be releasing new music in August 2024. However, legal between their label ROAR (Rock Of Angels Records) with RPM (Reigning Phoenix Music) has meant this album will be delayed until February 2025.

== Discography ==
Iron Maiden

- The Soundhouse Tapes (1979)
- Axe Attack (first press) (1980) – "Running Free"
- Metal For Muthas (1980)
- "Running Free" (1980) – "Burning Ambition" only
- BBC Archives (2002) (Friday Rock Show Session from 1979)

Airforce

- Origins of Iron (2015) - "War Games" only
- Judgement Day (2016)
- The Black Box Recordings: Volume 1 EP (2016)
- The Black Box Recordings: Volume 2 EP The Soundhouse Edition (2017)
- The Black Box Recordings: Volume 2 EP (2018)
