= Airforce (band) =

British heavy metal band

- Origin: London, England
- Genres: New wave of British heavy metal, Heavy metal
- Years active: 1986–2001, 2008–present (hiatus 1997–2001)
- Labels: Pitch Black; Rock of Angels
- Members: Tony Hatton; Doug Sampson; Chop Pitman; Flávio Lino
- Past members: Freddy Ball; Keith Haggis; Rolf Prommel; Sebastian Bolocan; Sam Sampson; Mick Dietz; Dee Dyaz; Ian Jacklin; Neil Thompson; Dilian Arnaudov; Ivan Giannini
- Website: airforcerockband.co.uk

Airforce is a British heavy metal band formed in London, England in 1986. The band were active until 2001, before reforming in 2008, and releasing their first studio album Judgement Day in 2016.

== History ==
Airforce were formed in North East London in 1986, after several years of previous projects by the band's founding members, which could be traced back to the late 1970s. The band came together when Iron Maiden bassist Steve Harris introduced former Iron Maiden drummer Doug Sampson to heavy metal guitarist Chop Pitman. The band mainly performed around their home city of London with multiple vocalists over the years, but were largely inactive by 1997, with the band eventually breaking up in 2001 without having released a single studio record.

Airforce reformed in 2008, and finally released their first studio album Judgement Day in July 2016, thirty years after their inception. The band have since released a further two full-length studio albums.

== Band members ==
=== Current members ===
- Chop Pitman – guitars (1986–2001, 2008–present)
- Doug Sampson – drums (1986–1999, 2010–present)
- Tony Hatton – bass (1986–2001, 2016–present)
- Flávio Lino – vocals (2019–present)

=== Past members ===
- Sam "Tomcat" Sampson – vocals (1987)
- Keith Haggis – lead guitar (?–2001)
- Rolf Prommel – vocals (?–2001)
- Mick Dietz – drums (1999–2001)
- Dee Dyaz – vocals (2008–2009)
- Sebastian Bolocan – vocals (2009–2010)
- Ian Jacklin – drums (2009–2010
- Neil Thompson – bass (2010)
- Freddy Ball – bass, vocals (2010–2016)
- Dilian Arnaudov – vocals (2016–2018)
- Ivan Giannini – vocals (2018–2019

== Discography ==
=== Full length albums ===
- Judgement Day (2016)
- Strike Hard (2020)
- Acts of Madness (2025)

=== Extended plays ===
- The Black Box Recordings: Volume 1 (2017)
- The Black Box Recordigns: Volume 2 (2018)

=== Live albums ===
- Live Locked N' Loaded in Poland Lublin Radio (2021)

=== Singles ===
- Band of Brothers (2019)
- Among The Shadows (2024)
- Westworld (2025)
- Cursed Moon (2025)
