= BBC Archives (album) =

Live album by Iron Maiden
- Released: 4 November 2002
- Recorded: 14 November 1979 – 20 August 1988
- Venues: Maida Vale Studios, London; Little John's Farm, Reading; Monsters of Rock festival, Donington Park
- Genre: Heavy metal
- Length: 148:19
- Label: EMI
- Producer: Tony Wilson

Iron Maiden chronology
Eddie's Archive (2002)	BBC Archives (2002)	Beast over Hammersmith (2002)

BBC Archives is a live album by the English heavy metal band Iron Maiden, released on 4 November 2002 as part of the Eddie's Archive box set. It is a collection of songs from three live shows and one live radio broadcast, recorded by the BBC between 1979 and 1988.

== Track listing ==
All songs written by Steve Harris, except where noted.

=== Disc One ===
BBC Radio 1 Friday Rock Show, 14 November 1979
No.	Title	Writer(s)	Original Album	Length
1.	"Iron Maiden"		1980 ~ Iron Maiden	3:46
2.	"Running Free"	Paul Di'Anno, Harris	1980 ~ Iron Maiden	3:10
3.	"Transylvania"		1980 ~ Iron Maiden	4:03
4.	"Sanctuary"	Di'Anno, Harris, Dave Murray	1980 ~ Iron Maiden	3:45

Reading Festival, 28 August 1982
No.	Title	Writer(s)	Original Album	Length
5.	"Wrathchild"		1981 ~ Killers	3:32
6.	"Run to the Hills"		1982 ~ The Number of the Beast	5:36
7.	"Children of the Damned"		1982 ~ The Number of the Beast	4:48
8.	"The Number of the Beast"		1982 ~ The Number of the Beast	5:29
9.	"22 Acacia Avenue"	Harris, Adrian Smith	1982 ~ The Number of the Beast	6:36
10.	"Transylvania"		1980 ~ Iron Maiden	6:20
11.	"The Prisoner"	Harris, Smith	1982 ~ The Number of the Beast	5:50
12.	"Hallowed Be Thy Name"		1982 ~ The Number of the Beast	7:37
13.	"Phantom of the Opera"		1980 ~ Iron Maiden	7:02
14.	"Iron Maiden"		1980 ~ Iron Maiden	4:58

=== Disc Two ===
Reading Festival, 23 August 1980
No.	Title	Writer(s)	Original Album	Length
1.	"Prowler"		1980 ~ Iron Maiden	4:27
2.	"Remember Tomorrow"	Di'Anno, Harris	1980 ~ Iron Maiden	5:59
3.	"Killers"	Di'Anno, Harris	1981 ~ Killers	4:43
4.	"Running Free"	Di'Anno, Harris	1980 ~ Iron Maiden	3:53
5.	"Transylvania"		1980 ~ Iron Maiden	4:49
6.	"Iron Maiden"		1980 ~ Iron Maiden	4:56

Monsters of Rock Festival, Donington, 20 August 1988
No.	Title	Writer(s)	Original Album	Length
7.	"Moonchild"	Dickinson, Smith	1988 ~ Seventh Son of a Seventh Son	5:43
8.	"Wrathchild"		1981 ~ Killers	3:00
9.	"Infinite Dreams"		1988 ~ Seventh Son of a Seventh Son	5:51
10.	"The Trooper"		1983 ~ Piece of Mind	4:05
11.	"Seventh Son of a Seventh Son"		1988 ~ Seventh Son of a Seventh Son	10:27
12.	"The Number of the Beast"		1982 ~ The Number of the Beast	4:43
13.	"Hallowed Be Thy Name"		1982 ~ The Number of the Beast	7:10
14.	"Iron Maiden"		1980 ~ Iron Maiden	6:01
Total length:				148:19

== Personnel ==
Production and performance credits are adapted from the album liner notes.

Iron Maiden

BBC Radio 1 Friday Rock Show, 14 November 1979

- Paul Di'Anno – vocals
- Steve Harris – bass
- Dave Murray – guitar
- Tony Parsons – guitar
- Doug Sampson: drums

Reading Festival, 28 August 1982

- Bruce Dickinson – vocals
- Steve Harris – bass
- Dave Murray – guitar
- Adrian Smith – guitar
- Clive Burr – drums

Reading Festival, 23 August 1980

- Paul Di'Anno – vocals
- Steve Harris – bass
- Dave Murray – guitar
- Dennis Stratton – guitar
- Clive Burr – drums

Monsters of Rock festival, Donington, 20 August 1988

- Bruce Dickinson – vocals
- Steve Harris – bass
- Dave Murray – guitar
- Adrian Smith – guitar
- Nicko McBrain – drums

Production

- Tony Wilson – producer, mixing
- Nick Watson – mastering
- Derek Riggs – cover illustration
- Ross Halfin – photography
- Robert Ellis – photography
- George Bodnar – photography
- George Chin – photography
- Tony Motram – photography
- Virginia Turbett – photography
