= Soulfood =

German music and video game distributor

Soulfood Music Distribution GmbH is a German company distributing music and video games as well as related merchandise products. The company's distribution deals usually cover Germany, Austria and Switzerland (G/A/S). The headquarters of the company are located in Hamburg, Germany.

== History ==
Soulfood Music Distribution was founded in May 2002 by music distribution executives Georg Schmitz and Jochen Richert. From 1990 on, both were employed by then-independent label and distributor Intercord. In 1998, both left the company to build alternative distributor Connected for edel GmbH. Then they created in cooperation with DADC Austria their own distribution service – Soulfood.

== Labels ==
As of June 2008.

- 13th Planet Records
- 17 Hippies
- 2006 Records
- 4RT Music Management
- Ace Records
- AFM Records
- Alfa Matrix
- Ant Acid Audio
- AOR Heaven
- Artist Station Records
- Bad Taste Records
- Beatdown Hardwear
- Betonkopf Media
- BGO Records
- Bioworld Merchandising
- Blue Rose Records
- Cadiz Music
- Charly
- CHS / Concert Video
- CID
- Classic Rock Distribution
- Clubstar
- Cool D:Vision
- Corazong
- Cyclone Empire
- Deaf & Dumb
- Demolition
- Demon
- Demons Run Amok
- Distributionz
- Dope Noir
- Dreyfus
- Dritte Wahl
- DRT Entertainment
- Einheit Produktionen
- Enja
- Enja HW
- ESL Music
- Evangeline
- Exile On Mainstream Records
- Fansation
- FOD Records
- Frontiers Records
- G-Stone Recordings
- GLM
- Gottdiscs
- Hamburg Records
- Hopeless Records
- Hypertension
- I Luv Money Records
- IN-D Records
- Infacted Recordings
- Ipecac Recordings
- Jeepster
- John Silver
- JoWooD Productions
- Lifeforce Records
- Limb Music
- Listenable Records
- Locomotive Records
- Massacre Records
- Mate in Germany
- Megapress
- Metal Heaven
- Metal Mind Productions
- Minuswelt
- Modernsoul
- Morbid Records
- Music Avenue
- Nettwerk Music Group
- Neue Zeiten
- Pica Music
- Premium Records
- Prophecy Productions
- Psychonaut Records
- Pure Steel Records
- Purple Records
- Rawhead
- Regain Records
- Remedy Records
- ROAR! Rock of Angels Records
- Rockphone Records
- Rootdown
- Sanctuary Records
- Season Of Mist
- Selfmade Records
- Silverdust Records
- Skip
- Smilodon
- Southern Lord
- Southern Records
- Spinefarm Records
- Suburban Records
- Swell Creek Records
- T2 Media
- Totentanz
- Touch And Go Records
- Trisol Music Group
- Trollhorn Records
- Union Square Music
- Victory Records
- W-Productions
- Wolkenreise
- Wolverine Records
