= Ship in Your Trip =

Ship In Your Trip

Studio album by Sorrowful Angels
- Released: August 15, 2009
- Recorded: CFN Recordings Studio, Athens, Greece. October–December 2008
- Genre: Gothic metal
- Length: 45:59
- Label: Sleaszy Rider Records
- Producer: Dion Christodoulatos

Sorrowful Angels chronology
Ship In Your Trip (2009)	Omens (2012)

Professional ratings
Review scores
Source	Rating
Metal Storm	7/10 stars

Ship In Your Trip is the debut album of the band Sorrowful Angels. It was recorded between October and December 2008. All music is credited to Dion Christodoulatos and lyrics to Dion Christodoulatos and Kostas Katoikos.

== Track listing ==
1. "Second Life" – 4:29
2. "Denial" – 3:49
3. "A Long Stay" – 4:25
4. "Ship in Your Trip" – 2:40
5. "Laws of Deceit" – 4:06
6. "Red Sunrise" – 3:33
7. "Final Win" – 3:29
8. "Suicidal Manners" – 3:46
9. "How to Lose a Star" – 5:08
10. "I'm Home" – 7:06
