= The Burning (British Lion album) =

Studio album by British Lion
- Released: 17 January 2020
- Studio: Barnyard Studio, Harlow, Essex, UK
- Genre: Heavy metal
- Length: 60:11
- Label: Parlophone (International edition); Explorer1 Music, LLC; Warner Music (Japanese edition)
- Producer: Steve Harris

British Lion chronology
British Lion (2012)	The Burning (2020)

Singles from The Burning
- 1. "Spit Fire" Released: 26 October 2018; 2. "Lightning" Released: 31 October 2019; 3. "The Burning" Released: 13 December 2019

The Burning is the second album by Iron Maiden's bass guitarist Steve Harris's British Lion project. It was released on 17 January 2020 and was produced by Harris. It was the first album under the British Lion moniker, transforming the project from solo to band.

The album was preceded by the singles "Spit Fire" on 26 October 2018, "Lightning" on 31 October 2019 and the title track "The Burning" on 13 December 2019.

Following the release of The Burning, critics published reviews on their thoughts of the album. Metal Planet Music voiced that "the first thing that strikes you is the music, great hard rock with melody and class, but it’s the heart and emotion that will stay with you long after the last note rings out. Coming eight years after their debut, ‘The Burning’ is the second album by British Lion and the Steve Harris led quintet have made a record that is at once modern, nostalgic and timeless".

== Critical reception ==
Professional ratings
Review scores
Source	Rating
Metal Hammer Italia	62/100
Cryptic Rock	4/5 stars
Classic Rock	4/5 stars
Kerrang	4/5 stars
Metal Temple	9/10
Distorted Sound	8/10
Planet Mosh	3/5 stars

Kerrang! mainly spoke upon the vocals of the album stating that "the band's debut was rather a baptism of fire for singer Richard Taylor, who had to weather some predictable yet redundant criticisms comparing him to Bruce Dickinson from Steve’s “other” band. He sings like he has a point to prove throughout The Burning. A telling sign of the frontman's burgeoning confidence comes on "Elysium" – a song that boasts a killer chorus but an even better final passage, as he belts out a series of absolutely massive sustained notes over a swelling choral section. Equally impressive is his ability to extract emotion from a song. Whether he's communing with lost souls on "Lightning" or offering a consolatory ear on closer "Native Son", he often brings a moving sense of fragility to the fore. Clearly, this particular lion has more at its disposal than claws alone"

Metal Temple deemed the album a 9/10 saying “The Burning” is just what a sophomore album should be. A continuation, with enthusiasm, growth and development. Harris is his usual subdued bass thumping brilliance. Hawkins and Leslie's dual guitar attack is on point, Dawson's drums precise and well deftly executed. Taylor's vocals add a final layer of confidence to the formula that seals the deal. British Lion's "The Burning" is refreshing in its telling of the story, and hints of even better tales in the future.

Classic Rock rated the album a 4/5, and believes "The Burning sounds vastly more punchy and powerful than its predecessor, while also giving the distinct impression that British Lion have evolved into a fiery and characterful ensemble with a strong identity of their own". The review continued by stating that "we are still firmly in traditional rock territory here, and Harris's love of UFO and Golden Earring remains as cheerfully conspicuous as ever, but thanks to a brighter, breezier sound and unmistakable hints of looseness and swagger, everything from the briskly uplifting title track to the brooding hulk of "Bible Black" sparkles with freshness and weirdly youthful vigour".

Cryptic Rock said British Lion are one of the more interesting and intriguing side projects in Hard rock and Heavy metal today. Arguably the most dynamic and engaging bassist of his time, Steve Harris is best known for emphatically standing on stage with his foot on the amp while pounding out ferocious bass riffs for Iron Maiden. Hearing these lions roar, let's step into the cage and feel The Burning. As a first time listener of British Lion, one will immediately notice the distinct difference between British Lion and the melodic technical ecstasy of Iron Maiden.

KNAC stated that "good things come to those who wait". "The Burning is a molten magma of soaring and even syncopated vocals that hover over sometimes haunting neo-Celtic melodies and sometimes epic, wistful and melancholic lyrical themes".

The album was voted Album of the Year by Paul Stenning for BraveWords.

== Track listing ==
All songs are written by Steve Harris, Richard Taylor, and David Hawkins, except where noted.

The Burning track listing
No.	Title	Writer(s)	Length
1.	"City of Fallen Angels"		5:20
2.	"The Burning"		5:15
3.	"Father Lucifer"		4:38
4.	"Elysium"		5:11
5.	"Lightning"		5:49
6.	"Last Chance"	Grahame Leslie; Ian Roberts; Taylor; Harris	6:05
7.	"Legend"		4:06
8.	"Spit Fire"		6:19
9.	"Land of the Perfect People"	Taylor; Harris	4:52
10.	"Bible Black"		6:33
11.	"Native Son"		6:03
Total length:			60:11

== Personnel ==
British Lion

- Richard Taylor – vocals
- David Hawkins – guitars
- Grahame Leslie – guitars
- Steve Harris – bass guitars, keyboards, production
- Simon Dawson – drums

=== Additional personnel ===
- Tony Newton – engineering, recording, mixing
- Ade Emsley – mastering
- John McMurtrie – photography
- Gustavo Sazes – album cover
- Matt Cox – templating, booklet artwork

== Charts ==
Chart (2020)	Peak position
Belgian Albums (Ultratop Wallonia)	131
German Albums (Offizielle Top 100)	89
Scottish Albums (OCC)	28
Spanish Albums (PROMUSICAE)	46
Swiss Albums (Schweizer Hitparade)	27
UK Rock & Metal Albums (OCC)	3
