= British Lion (album) =

Studio album by Steve Harris
- Released: 24 September 2012
- Studio: Monkey Puzzle, Suffolk, UK (drum & vocal tracks 2, 4, 9); Purple Studio, Norwich, UK (drum & vocal tracks 1, 2 7); BL Studios, Harlow, UK (back tracks & vocal track 10); Barnyard Studios, Harlow, Essex (back tracks); Algarve Studio, Faro, Portugal (back tracks)
- Genre: Hard rock
- Length: 52:11
- Label: EMI (International edition); UME (US edition)
- Producer: Steve Harris

Steve Harris chronology
British Lion (2012)	The Burning (2020)

British Lion is the debut solo album by English bassist Steve Harris, best known as the bassist and primary songwriter for the English heavy metal band Iron Maiden. The album was announced on 18 July 2012 and released on 24 September.

== Background ==
Following the initial announcement of the album's release in July 2012, Classic Rock revealed that the project originated with a band, named British Lion, which Harris had been mentoring in the early 1990s. Harris confirmed this during an interview with Classic Rock the following month, explaining that he became involved after "Graham Leslie [guitar] came to me with a cassette of songs... and I thought they were really good, so I said I’d try to help his band do something. I ended up managing them and producing them and writing with them." After the original band split up, he "kept in touch with Richie [Taylor, vocals] and Graham, and then Richie was working with another guitarist called David Hawkins, who's a really talented guy, and so we started writing songs together." After several years of work, due to Harris being occupied with Iron Maiden, the album ultimately consists of "six songs written with Richie and David, there's one with just me and Richie, and the others are me, Richie, Graham and a couple of other guys that were around at the time." In an interview published by Kerrang! in September, Harris said that he considers British Lion "more of a side-project" than a solo record.

Stylistically, Harris argues that the record is "more mainstream rock, very British sounding, very 70s-influenced and quite commercial… but good commercial. There's all kinds of stuff going on, with nods to the Who and UFO and some classic British rock bands, but it's not the progressive rock album some might be expecting." During his appearance on That Metal Show in September 2012, Harris revealed that he tried a number of bass-playing techniques which he would not do with Iron Maiden, such as letting his strings "go dead".

Harris stated that he intends to tour the release at some stage, remarking that, although "there are no shows arranged yet", "I know we’ll be playing clubs, which is great because I’ve not played clubs for years", and that he intends to release a follow up album in the future. A European club tour, taking place in February and March, was eventually announced on 10 January 2013.

A music video for the song "This Is My God" was released on 2 October 2012, followed by a video for "Us Against the World" on 28 November.

== Critical reception ==
Professional ratings
Aggregate scores
Source	Rating
Metacritic	56/100
Review scores
Source	Rating
About.com	3/5 stars
AllMusic	2.5/5 stars
Artistdirect	5/5 stars
Classic Rock	7/10
Drowned in Sound	3/10
Kerrang!	4/5 stars
Metal Hammer	8/10
PopMatters	5/10
Record Collector	3/5 stars
Revolver	3/5

Kerrang! deemed it "a brilliant album", describing it as "the sound of an incredibly talented songwriter stepping outside of what he'd normally do and indulging himself in something a bit different with a group of excellent musicians." Metal Hammer were also very positive towards the release, praising the "infectious re-imaginings of the UFO and Thin Lizzy albums that inspired their creator as a kid," concluding that "This is a big hearted and ferocious triumph." Although they criticised the album's lyrics, Classic Rock complimented vocalist Richard Taylor and guitarist Graham Leslie, concluding that "British Lion is an album that is both exactly what you'd expect, and far better than that." Artistdirect awarded it full marks, stating that "As far as songwriters go, [Harris is] on the level with Jimmy Page and Tony Iommi, and his new album, British Lion, proves that tenfold".

== Track listing ==
All songs are written by Steve Harris, Richard Taylor, and David Hawkins unless otherwise noted.

No.	Title	Writer(s)	Length
1.	"This Is My God"		4:57
2.	"Lost Worlds"		4:58
3.	"Karma Killer"		5:29
4.	"Us Against the World"		4:12
5.	"The Chosen Ones"	Harris; Taylor	6:27
6.	"A World Without Heaven"	Barry Fitzgibbon; Harris; Grahame Leslie; Gary Liederman; Ian Roberts; Taylor	7:02
7.	"Judas"		4:58
8.	"Eyes of the Young"	Harris; Leslie; Roberts; Taylor	5:25
9.	"These Are the Hands"		4:28
10.	"The Lesson"		4:15
Total length:			52:11

== Personnel ==
- Steve Harris – bass, production
- Richard Taylor – vocals, production
- David Hawkins – guitars, keyboards (all tracks except 5, 6 and 8), production, recording
- Grahame Leslie – guitars (tracks 5, 6 and 8)
- Simon Dawson – drums (tracks 2, 4 and 9)

=== Additional personnel ===
- Barry Fitzgibbon – guitars (tracks 5, 6 and 8)
- Ian Roberts – drums (tracks 5, 6 and 8)
- Richard Cook – drums (tracks 1, 3 and 7)
- Kevin Shirley – mixing
- Ade Emsley – mastering

== Charts ==
Chart (2012)	Peak position
Austrian Albums (Ö3 Austria)	66
Belgian Albums (Ultratop Flanders)	180
Belgian Albums (Ultratop Wallonia)	72
Finnish Albums (Suomen virallinen lista)	22
French Albums (SNEP)	85
German Albums (Offizielle Top 100)	67
Italian Albums (FIMI)	39
Norwegian Albums (VG-lista)	19
Scottish Albums (OCC)	35
Spanish Albums (PROMUSICAE)	63
Swedish Albums (Sverigetopplistan)	30
Swiss Albums (Schweizer Hitparade)	40
UK Albums (OCC)	39
UK Rock & Metal Albums (OCC)	2
US Billboard 200	138
