= Sorrowful Angels =

Gothic Metal Band

- Origin: Athens, Greece
- Genres: Gothic metal
- Years active: 1999–present
- Labels: Rock of Angels Records, Warner, Sleaszy Rider, Black Lotus
- Members: Dion Christodoulatos; Nikolas Perlepe; Johny Litinakis; Stelios Pavlou
- Past members: See list of Sorrowful Angels former members
- Website: www.sorrowfulangels.com

Sorrowful Angels is a Greek gothic metal band.

== Early days (1999–2002) ==
Originally formed in 1999, the band soon started to land gigs in the Greek underground club scene presenting their initial atmospheric material and gradually making a name for themselves.

Until 2002, they manage to land some more high-profile gigs, most notably the Chania Rock Festival in Crete where they shared the stage with Anathema, U.D.O., Crossover and Deviser. Soon after, the band signed with Black Lotus Records and was about to release its debut album but while in the process of the recordings, the label declared bankruptcy and all announced titles were on hold indefinitely. The band shortly decided to split up.

== Reunion and Ship in Your Trip (2008–2010) ==
During December 2008 Sorrowful Angels announced a reunion after signing a record deal with Greek label Sleaszy Rider Records with a new lineup. They entered CFN Recordings Studio and recorded their debut album called "Ship in Your Trip". The self-financed album was engineered, mixed and produced by Dion Christodoulatos. Additionally, Mike Galiatsos (Snowblind, Nightfall) made a guest appearance in "How To Lose A Star". Along with the recordings, a video clip of the song "Denial" directed by Bob Katsionis (Firewind) was made for the promotion of the album. Soon after the band started gigging around Greece along with TV appearances promoting their work.

In April 2009, the band was handpicked by Klaus Meine (Scorpions) to enter the final round of the Scorpions Contest held in Greece. The band performed in the Scorpions Contest Finals in front of Klaus Meine and other notable figures of the music industry along with Secret Illusion and Spitfire.

Later that year, a special EP containing 5 tracks out of the debut album was made and packaged along with Metal Hammer’s (Gr) October issue giving the band extensive promotion. Within the same month an official statement was published that drummer Dimitris Stamatis was not a member of Sorrowful Angels anymore due to personal reasons. His replacement was Fivos Andriopoulos (Saddolls).

== Breakup with Sleaszy Rider Label ==
In January 2010, the band announced that they would no longer continue with Sleaszy Rider Records and that for the remaining promotional period for "Ship In Your Trip", the band would continue independently.

In April 2010, they were chosen as the opening act for Katatonia's two shows in Athens and Thessaloniki, Greece during their "New Night Over Europe Tour". Norwegian band Sirenia was also included in these 2 shows. More shows followed in Greece, including these with Rotting Christ at Volos Golden R. Festival.

== Omens (2011–2013) ==
During October 2010 it was announced that vocalist Kostas Katoikos was leaving the band and that the remaining members would continue as a quartet. Guitarist, Dion Christodoulatos takes over the frontman duties from that point.

A couple of months before the release of their upcoming album, a free downloadable EP, named the Omens EP was distributed on the net for promotional purposes. The EP included among others Code 64's cover "Deviant" which was recorded on request of the band, and was also included on their "Deviant" single EP

From October to December 2010, Sorrowful Angels entered their personal CFN Recordings Studio once again, and recorded their second album, called "Omens". It was released by Warner in December 2011

Shortly afterwards they were chosen to open Paradise Lost’s show in Athens on their Draconian Times Anniversary Tour and present their new material live.

During winter of 2012, "Omens Over Greece Tour" took place, and the band performed many shows throughout Greece, promoting their new album.

As a conclusion of the tour, 2 final shows were announced supporting Moonspell during their "Alpha Noir / Omega White Tour" in September 2012. A free digital promo EP was released during summer of 2012, named "Reborn : A Tribute to Moonspell". Three Moonspell songs were re-recorded by Sorrowful Angels (Luna, Nocturna, Scorpion Flower), featuring performances by Gogo Melone (Luna Obscura), Spyla Dibela (Fallen Arise), George Downloved (Saddolls),

== Paul Di'Anno tours, projects and departures (2013–2014) ==
During 2013, Dionisis Christodoulatos became a live member of Classical, Opera and Vocal Orchestra "Chaostar" (consisting of members of Septic Flesh), taking over piano and keyboard duties in the band.

Later the same year, the band announce their first tour with Paul Di'Anno. Between 2013 and 2014, Sorrowful Angels toured extensively in Greece and the Balkans with Di'Anno as both his band and support group. During the second tour bassist Ilias Bouzeas, left and Johny Litinakis took over.

During winter of 2014, the band announced a special unplugged gig organized by Trailblazer Records, where frontman, Dion Christodoulatos, would play for the first time the piano instead of electric guitar. For the promotion of this project, the band released in January, an acoustic version of "Omens" song as a digital video single.

In July 2014, Sorrowful Angels Participated at Italy's Total Metal Festival along with Kreator, Behemoth and Decapitated among others.

Shortly after they are requested by Metal Hammer GR, to record a cover of Pink Floyd's "Time" from The Dark Side of the Moon. The track was part of "Landing on the Dark Side of the Moon" album, essentially a tribute to The Dark Side of the Moon.

On 15 November, Sorrowful Angels opened for Diary of Dreams in Athens. This was the last live performance of drummer Chris Stratigos with the band. A few weeks later, the band used footage from that show combined with new audio recordings and released an official videoclip called "Suicidal Manners (Revisited)". This was the first single under their new label Rock of Angels Records.

== Remedie (2015–present) ==
In 2015, Sorrowful Angels announced their signing with Rock of Angels Records (Roar) to release their third full-length album, entitled Remedie. The official release date was set for October 2015. Two dates were announced to present their new material live, before its release. September 4 at Rock on The Beach Festival and September 6 supporting Bonfire.

== Line-up ==
=== Current ===
- Dion Christodoulatos - guitars, keyboards, vocals (2008–present)
- Nikolas Perlepe - guitar (2013–present)
- Johny Litinakis - bass (2014–present)
- Stelios Pavlou - drums (2015–present)

=== Former members (studio, session and live) ===
- Babis Nikou - bass (1999–2002)
- Evgenia Theocharatou - vocals keyboards (1999–2002)
- Ada Spiratou - vocals (1999–2002)
- Vasilis Georgiou - drums (1999–2002)
- Lukas Liatopoulos - drums (2008–2009)
- Dimitris Stamatis - drums (2009)
- Fivos Andriopoulos - drums (2010–2012)
- Kostas Katoikos - vocals (2008–2010)
- George Mountaneas - bass (2008–2012)
- Dariusz Sipiora - guitars (1999–2012)
- Apollwn Siakandaris - guitars (2012)
- Fillipos Papakyriakou - guitars (2012)
- Stelios Mavromytis - guitars (2012)
- Ilias Bouzeas - bass (2012–2014)
- Chris Stratigos - drums (2012-2014)

== Discography ==
=== Studio albums ===
- Ship in Your Trip (2009)
- Omens (2012)
- Remedie (2015)

=== EPs ===
- Omens EP (2011)
- Summer Goths E.P. (2012)
- Reborn: A Greek Tribute to Moonspell (2012)

== Videography ==
- Denial (2009, from album Ship in Your Trip)
- Suicidal Manners (2010, from album Ship in Your Trip)
- Right of Way (2011, from album Omens)
- Omens (Acoustic Version) (2014)
- Time (2014, Pink Floyd, from album "Landing on the Dark Side of the Moon")
- Suicidal Manners (Revisited) (2015)
