= Rublood =

Italian industrial metal band

- Origin: Turin, Italy
- Genres: Industrial metal, gothic metal, dark metal
- Years active: 2010−present
- Labels: Bakerteam Records, The Orchard (company)
- Members: Ruben Roll
- Website: https://www.rublood.com/

Rublood is an Italian industrial metal band from Turin, Italy. Formed in 2010, the group are noted for their dark horror-themed lyrics, pessimistic and misanthropic social commentary, distinctive trademark face paint, dark stage uniforms and physical appearances that correspond to gothic fashion. Rublood have supported live acts by bands such as Avatar, Deathstars and Sex Gang Children the latter of which was part of the inspiration for Rublood. In 2015 the band appearance at the Chania Rock Festival in Chania, Greece where they shared the stage with Sabaton, Gus G and Flotsam and Jetsam and supported Butcher Babies and Hanzel und Gretyl on their 2015 tour through Italy.

== Biography ==
Rublood descended from the band Dark Star, dedicated to gothic metal. The disbandment leads the singer Ruben Roll to find new musicians with whom he can create a style aimed towards contemporary and innovative sounds, thanks to electronic instrumentation. In 2010 they recorded their first demo, Generation Rublood. Inspired by the atmospheric sounds of bands like Rammstein, Depeche Mode and Deathstars, Rublood created their ownunique mix and a new method to conceive dark and poetic music. One of the band’s strengths, on the live scene, are the choreographies created by their dancers, the Rubladies, who delight the audience with their magnificent gothic spectacle. In October 2013 they released their first full-length Star Vampire through Bakerteam Records. Shortly thereafter they are noticed by the production of the film Studio Illegale (released in cinema in February 2013 by Warner Bros.) in which, as well as to include one of their songs on the soundtrack, also appear as actors. They turn their first video clip for the song "Through The Looking-Glass" with Moviedel Productions and directed by Maurizio Del Piccolo. They turn their second videoclip for the song "Electro Starfuckers" always with Moviedel Productions and always directed by Maurizio Del Piccolo.

== Musical style and influences ==
Although Rublood is often categorised as Industrial metal, their music spans a variety of related styles, including heavy metal, Dark metal, and Gothic metal.

== Current members ==
- Ruben Roll - Vocals & Keyboards

== Discography ==
=== Demo ===
- 2010 - Generation Rublood EP

=== Albums ===
- 2013 - Star Vampire

=== Videos ===
- 2013 - Through The Looking-Glass
- 2014 - Electro Starfuckers
- 2015 - Rainfall
- 2024 - Black of my Heart
- 2024 - Till Death

== Reviews ==
- Star Vampire reviewed:
- Star Vampire reviewed:
- Star Vampire reviewed:
- Star Vampire reviewed:
- Star Vampire reviewed:
- Star Vampire reviewed:
- Star Vampire reviewed:
- Star Vampire reviewed:
