= Eddie's Archive =

Box set by Iron Maiden
- Released: 4 November 2002
- Recorded: 14 November 1979 - 1999
- Genre: Heavy metal
- Length: 6:17:59
- Label: EMI

Iron Maiden chronology
Rock in Rio (2002)	Eddie's Archive (2002)	BBC Archives (2002)

Professional ratings
Review scores
Source	Rating
AllMusic	3/5 stars

Eddie's Archive is a box set by British heavy metal band Iron Maiden, released on 16 November 2002. The box, an embossed metal casket featuring the face of mascot Eddie, contains three double CDs, the Iron Maiden family tree and a shot glass. The family tree is an updated version of the family tree that originally came with A Real Dead One in 1993.

Eddie's Archive was originally released as a limited edition, with the family tree numbered. However, due to demand, it was later re-released with a different colour inlay (changed from blue to red) and with the family tree unnumbered, in order to preserve the value of the original issue.

Speaking about the box set, bassist and band founder Steve Harris commented, "Eddie's Archive was released for the real collector. We always try hard to keep the quality there for people. We would make a hell of a lot more money if we didn't package a release looking like that, but we do it because we're proud of the Iron Maiden legacy and want to treat the fans with respect." The box was designed by Mark Wilkinson, who after hearing the band had thought of a wooden box, suggested that given it was intended to celebrate the group's 25th anniversary they should allude to a silver jubilee, albeit given a silver box would be too expensive the material was tin. Wilkison also drew the cover of one of the box set's albums, Best of the 'B' Sides.

== Contents ==
1. BBC Archives
2. Beast over Hammersmith
3. Best of the 'B' Sides
