= Remedie (Sorrowful Angels album) =

Studio album by Sorrowful Angels
- Released: October 2015
- Recorded: CFN Recordings Studio, Athens, Greece. April–July 2015
- Genre: Dark Metal
- Length: 43:28
- Label: Rock of Angels Records
- Producer: Dion Christodoulatos

Remedie is the third album of the band Sorrowful Angels. It was recorded between May and July 2015. All music and lyrics are credited to Dion Christodoulatos.

== Track listing ==
No.	Title	Length
1.	"Witch Hunt"	5:16
2.	"Shatterbox"	4:26
3.	"Ghosts of Concrete"	4:17
4.	"Immaculate Disguise"	3:33
5.	"Resonate My Senses"	4:32
6.	"Dream in Black"	3:55
7.	"Leap of Faith"	4:36
8.	"Against the Dying of the Light"	4:45
9.	"A Question of Pride"	8:09

== Credits ==
=== Sorrowful Angels ===
- Dion Christodoulatos – vocals, lead guitar, music and lyrics
- Nikolas Perlepe – rhythm guitar
- Johny Litinakis – bass guitar
- Stelios Pavlou – drums

=== Production ===
- Dion Christodoulatos – production, mixing

=== Artwork ===
- Themis "Fad" Ioannou – album artwork and photography
