= Doomocracy =

Greek doom metal band

Doomocracy is a Greek epic doom metal band. They among others released one album on No Remorse Records.

The band was founded on Crete in 2011.

== Discography ==
- The End Is Written (2014, Steel Gallery Records)
- Visions & Creatures of Imagination (2017, Steel Gallery Records)
- Unorthodox (2022, No Remorse Records)

== Reception ==
Powermetal.de gave excellent criticism to Doomocracy's first three albums, first giving The End Is Written 9 out of 10 points, then scoring their sophomore a perfect 10, followed by another 9 for Unorthodox. Vampster saw Unorthodox as "a true masterpiece" and one of the greatest albums of 2022. "The music possesses a certain sacred atmosphere, created in part by the magnificent choirs. Instrumentally, the band takes a sophisticated and intricate approach. The riffs and drumming are significantly more exciting and varied than on most standard doom albums [...] Michael Stavrakakis, with his flawless vocals, is the cherry on top of the magnificent doom cake that is Unorthodox".

Rock Hard gave 8 points to both The End Is Written and Unorthodox. Norway's Scream Magazine was more reserved, giving 4 out of 6 points to Unorthodox. The sound was "very inspired" by Candlemass, Memory Garden and Solitude Aeturnus, and reminded of those bands throughout. The record was solid, but lost the 5 rating due to the last part being "more uneven".
