= British Lion (band) =

British rock band

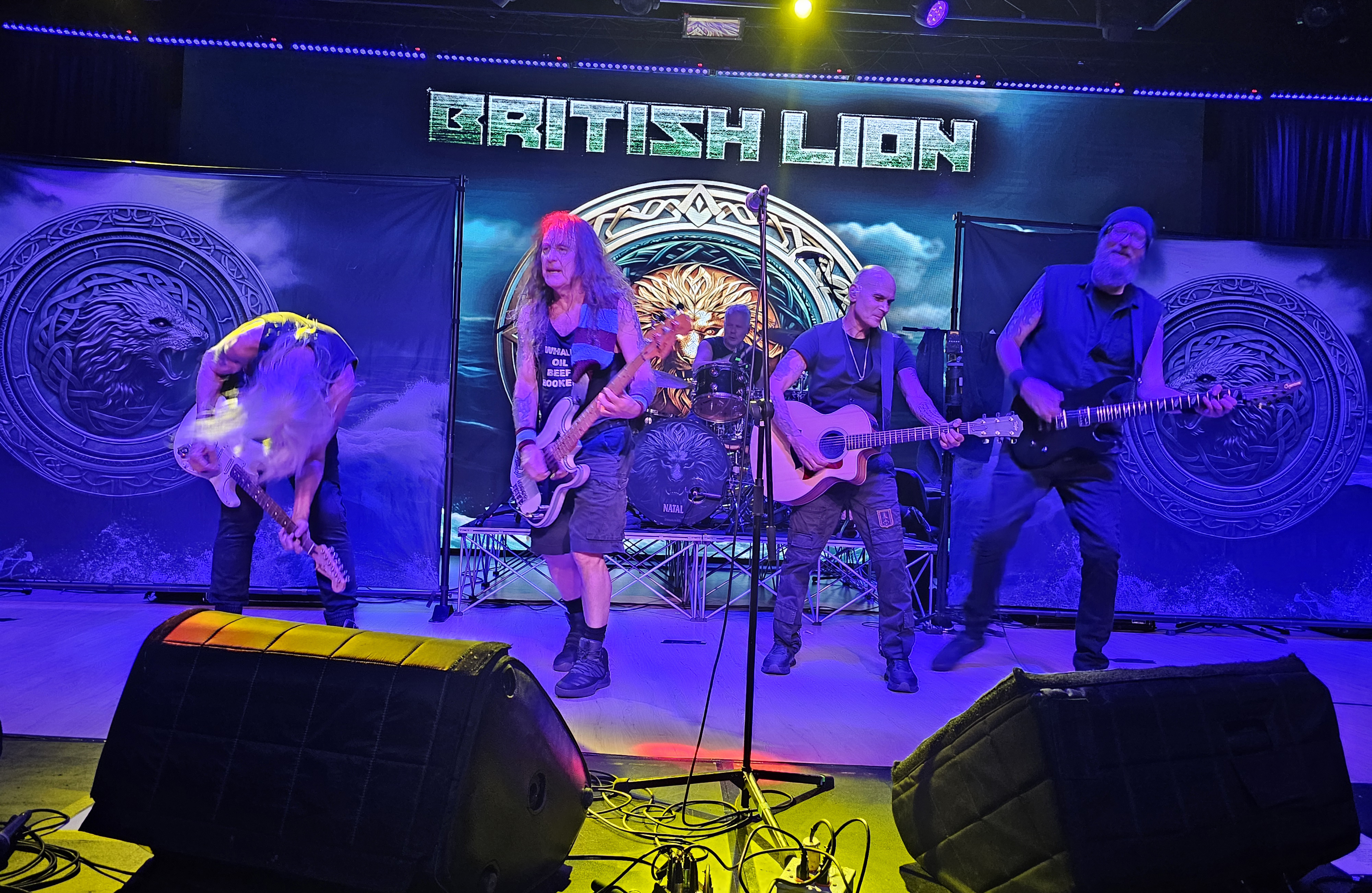
- British Lion in Bogota, Colombia (2024)

Background information
- Genres: Hard rock
- Years active: 2012–present
- Members: Steve Harris; Richard Taylor; David Hawkins; Grahame Leslie; Simon Dawson
- Website: britishlionuk.com

British Lion are an English hard rock band formed by Steve Harris, best known as the bassist for Iron Maiden.

== History ==
Steve Harris formed the band to play in small venues, as opposed to the large arenas typically played by Iron Maiden, and as an outlet for shorter hard rock-oriented songs in which he can experiment with different bass guitar styles. The band also includes singer Richard Taylor, guitarists David Hawkins and Grahame Leslie, and drummer Simon Dawson.

Harris had first met Leslie in the early 1990s after Leslie sent him a demo tape, and Harris mentored the careers of Leslie and Taylor for several years until deciding to include them in the British Lion project. The band's tours are typically scheduled after the conclusion of Iron Maiden tours, when Harris becomes interested in playing in clubs and theaters as he did in Iron Maiden's early years.

The album British Lion, released in 2012, was marketed as a solo album by Harris with the other musicians described as his backing band. The project was then re-positioned as a self-contained band with most songs written by Harris, Taylor, and Hawkins. The band completed two European club tours in 2013 and 2014. Their second album The Burning was released in January 2020. The album was voted Album of the Year by Paul Stenning for BraveWords. They then headlined their first U.S. tour in January and February of that year.

In 2024, Dawson became the touring drummer for Iron Maiden following Nicko McBrain's retirement from touring, though the latter remained an official member. In April of 2025 Harris confirmed the band had new material in the works. Then following a handful of one off appearances in previous years the band went on a full European headlining tour in August of 2025 and a U.K. tour in November and December.

== Musical style ==
In a 2025 interview Harris was asked on the difference of British Lion compared to his other band Iron Maiden. He stated:

The songs in BRITISH LION are driven by [singer Richard Taylor] and the guys, so it's just going to be different. Then I come in and get involved with that material in different aspects. Since it's driven by them, it's going to be different anyway. I mean, this sort of started off as a bit more UFO, which MAIDEN was also influenced by, but MAIDEN also had a lot of more prog type and all sorts of other influences as well. BRITISH LION is just more like a rock band with very strong melodies, and Richie's style of singing is very, very different from Bruce's [Dickinson]. I think he is a great singer."

== Band members ==
- Steve Harris – bass, keyboards
- Richard Taylor – lead vocals, acoustic guitar
- David Hawkins – guitar, keyboards
- Grahame Leslie – guitar
- Simon Dawson – drums

== Discography ==
- British Lion (2012) (Note: Initially billed as a solo album from Steve Harris. It was later retroactively established as the debut record from British Lion as a band.)
- The Burning (2020)
