= Rock of Angels Records =

Greek music label

ROAR! Rock of Angels Records
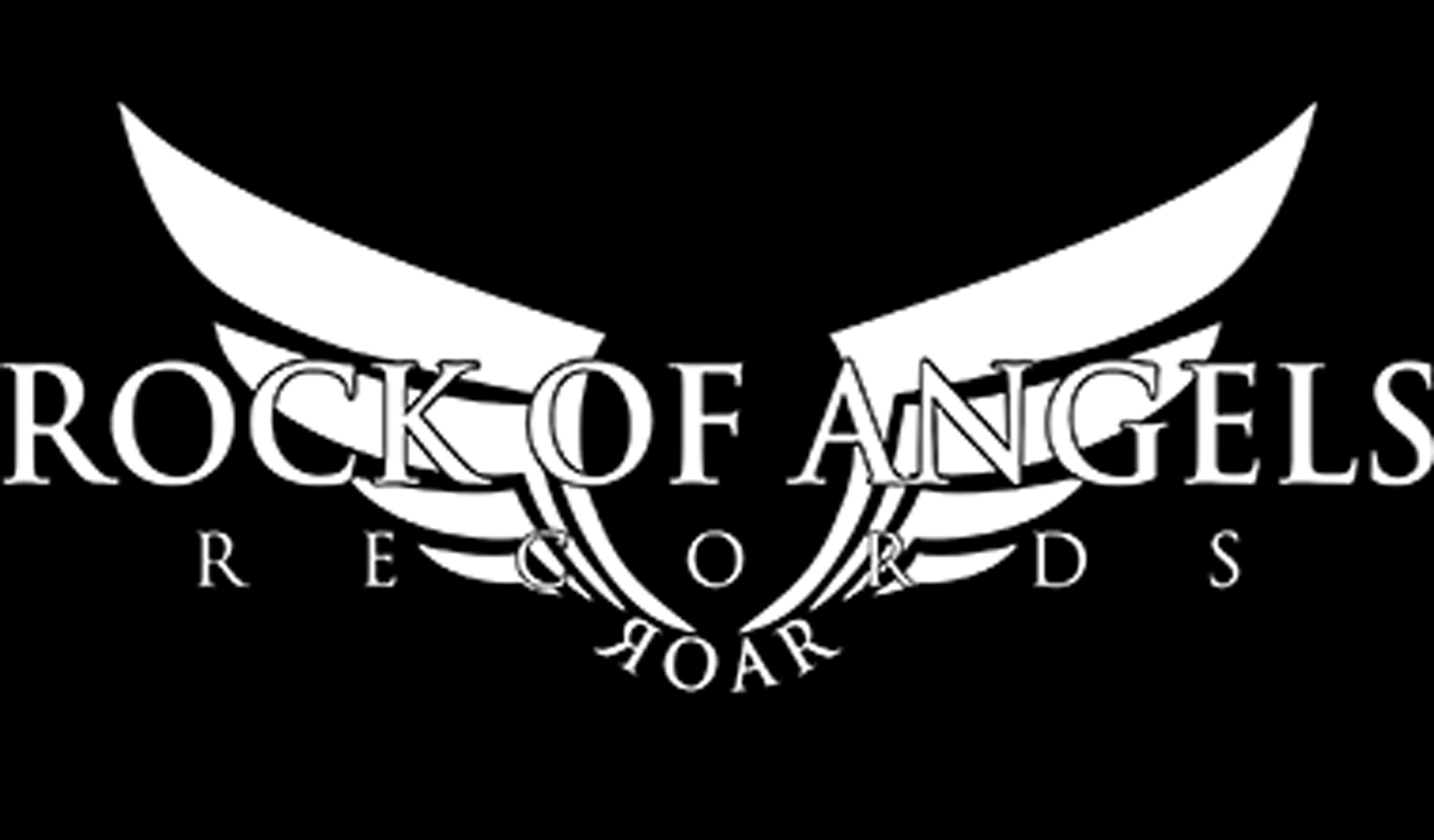
- Company type: IKE
- Industry: Music
- Genre: Heavy metal, hard rock
- Founded: 2012
- Headquarters: Thermaikos, Thessaloniki, Greece
- Key people: Lambros Kokkinos (CEO)
- Parent: Infinity Entertainment IKE
- Website: www.roar.gr

ROAR! Rock of Angels Records is a Greek music label with a focus on hard rock and heavy metal bands. The company is headquartered in the Angelochori, Thermaikos district of Thessaloniki. Distribution of the productions is carried out by Soulfood Music Distribution.The label Rock of Angels Records is a registered trademark of Infinity Entertainment IKE.

== Company history ==
The company was founded in 2012 by Akis Kosmidis – a fan of hard rock and heavy metal from his earliest youth. Initially, the company operated strictly as a music label under the name ROAR! Rock of Angels Records and focused on marketing young Greek bands from the heavy metal scene, which was particularly active at the time, while also licensing albums from more prominent bands – such as Stryper or Operation Mindcrime.

More than 50 different albums, including Nemesis by Sarissa and Blind Faith by Mean Streak have been released under the label ROAR! Rock of Angels Records, which has since been registered as a European trademark. The distribution of its own products is being carried out by Soulfood in Europe (with the exception of Greece and Cyprus) and plastichead code7 in Great Britain. Digital distribution is provided by Believe.

In September 2015, the open air festival "Rock on the Beach" was organised for the first time.

Expansion of business: In 2015, the company's name was eventually changed to Infinity Entertainment IKE. This was necessary as the company's mission expanded, having acquired exclusive distribution of audio media from other independent labels.

== Structure and distribution ==
The company is divided into several different business areas. For its own program, the in-house label ROAR! Rock of Angels Records is used, which specializes in heavy metal and rock music. Death metal and gothic metal are distributed under the sub-label Growl Records.

Distribution of the company's own products and those from other labels is handled by Infinity Entertainment regarding wholesalers and retailers in Greece and Cyprus. Infinity Entertainment has developed into one of the most important distributors in Greece for independent labels. Exclusive distribution agreements for Greece exist with Nuclear Blast, SPV, AFM Records and Frontiers Records among others.

Infinity Entertainment uses retail chains like Media Markt and Public Stores as well as many smaller specialized music stores as distribution channels. Online distribution is handled via the Music Megastore internet shop.

An exquisite wine was created and distributed under the name "Joe Lynn Turner – King of Dreams" thanks to a collaboration between Joe Lynn Turner, the former singer from Deep Purple and Rainbow, and the renowned Greek winery Nico Lazaridi.

== Current bands (selection) ==
- Airforce
- Astronomica
- Ashes of Ares
- Enemy Inside
- Monument
- Sarissa
- Sacrosanct
- Mean Streak
- Forbidden Seed
- Phase Reverse
- Sorrowful Angels
- Outloud
- 666packs
- False Memories
- Fallen Arise
- Memorain
- Kilmara
- Killson
- Overpower
- Last Union
- Mystic Prophecy
- Fireforce
- Mädhouse
