= Steve Harris (musician) =

British bassist (born 1956)

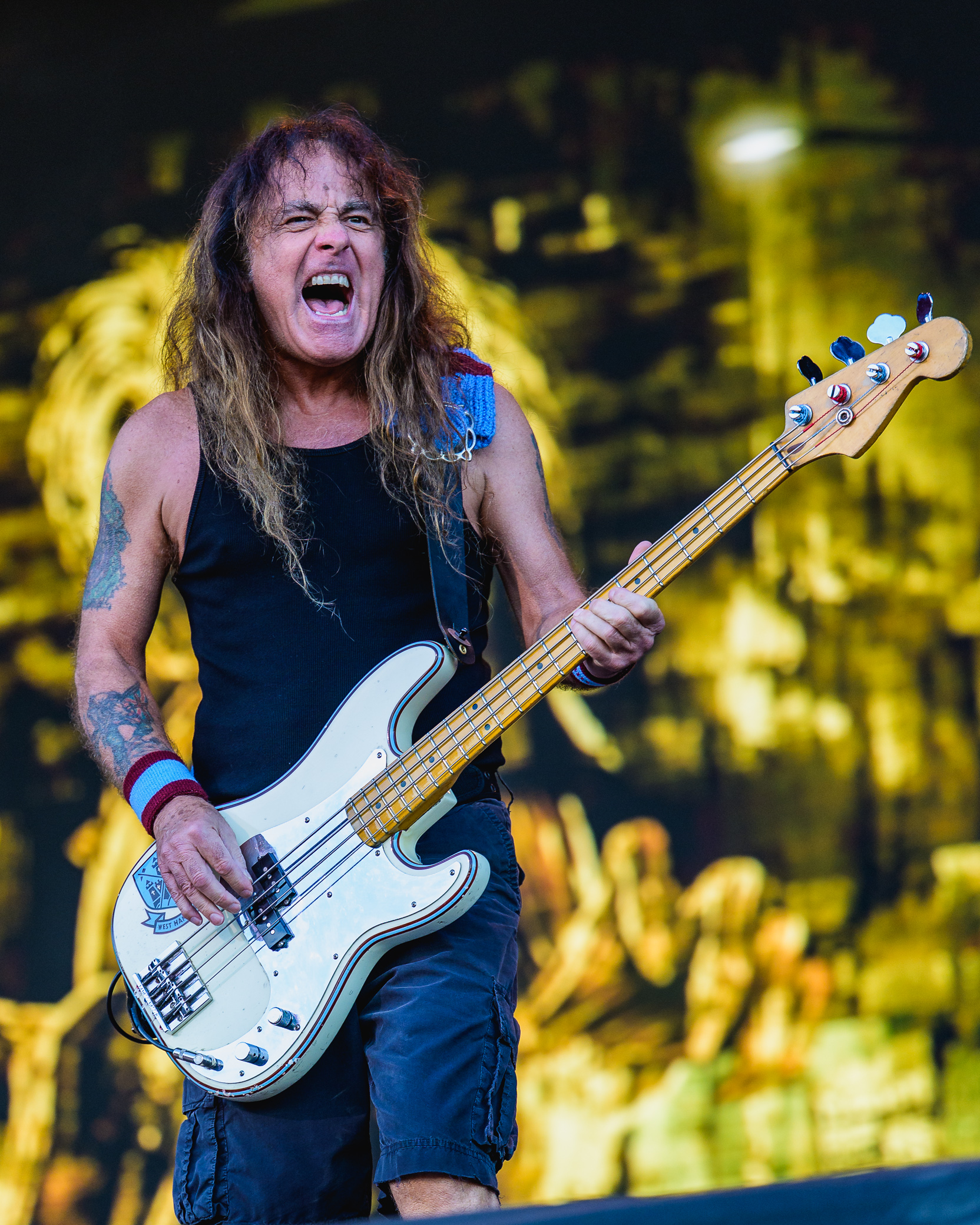
- Harris performing with Iron Maiden at Tons of Rock, Oslo, in 2026

Background information
- Born: Stephen Percy Harris; 12 March 1956 (age 70); Leytonstone, England
- Genres: Heavy metal; hard rock
- Occupations: Musician; songwriter
- Instruments: Bass; keyboards
- Years active: 1971–present
- Member of: Iron Maiden; British Lion

Stephen Percy Harris (born 12 March 1956) is an English musician and songwriter, best known as the bassist for heavy metal band Iron Maiden, which he founded in 1975. He is the only member who has been in the band for its entire history, while he and guitarist Dave Murray are the only members who have appeared on all of the band's studio albums.

Harris developed an influential style of bass playing, particularly the "gallop" which can be found on many Iron Maiden recordings, such as the singles "Run to the Hills" and "The Trooper". He was the band's primary songwriter in its early history, but in later years he has been more likely to collaborate with his other members of the band. Harris has also assumed other roles in Iron Maiden, contributing keyboards and backing vocals, co-producing albums, and directing live videos.

Harris is widely regarded as one of the best heavy metal bassists of all time. He has also led the hard rock side project British Lion.

== Early life ==
Harris was born on 12 March 1956 in the back room of his grandmother's house in Leytonstone, then part of Essex, where he grew up aspiring to be a professional footballer. Scouted by Wally St Pier, Harris was asked to train for West Ham United during his early teen years. After becoming interested in rock music in subsequent years, he realised that he no longer desired to play football professionally and envisioned a career in music instead. In particular, he was greatly influenced by the Beatles. Harris attended Leyton Senior High School for Boys (now Leyton Sixth Form College) where he studied architecture.

Initially Harris wanted to play drums, but did not have enough space for a drum kit in his house; he decided on learning bass instead. Entirely self-taught, his first bass was a copy of a Fender Precision model which cost him £40 in 1971.

Just ten months after he bought his first bass, Harris joined a band, initially known as Influence and later Gypsy's Kiss. After playing a small number of gigs, that band split. Harris joined a band called Smiler in February 1974. In this band, Harris began writing his own songs and worked with future Iron Maiden members Dennis Wilcock and Doug Sampson, but left as the band claimed his songs were too complicated and refused to play them. Harris claims to have played 30 to 40 shows with Smiler before he departed in 1975.

== Career ==
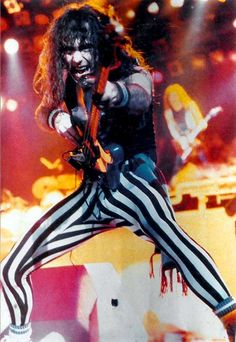
Harris in concert in 1983

=== Iron Maiden ===
Upon leaving Smiler, Harris went on to create Iron Maiden in mid-1975, with the band's name inspired by the film The Man in the Iron Mask. Until Iron Maiden signed their contract with EMI in 1979, Harris worked as an architectural draughtsman and later as a street sweeper.

During the early years of Iron Maiden, Harris was the band's principal composer and lyricist. His songwriting typically showcases his trademark galloping bass patterns, which features heavily in songs such as "The Trooper" and "Run to the Hills", and his progressive rock-influenced time changes. Later, Harris' songs became more progressive, and guitarist Adrian Smith has commented that Harris now prefers contributing "lyrics and melodies and arranging" to other member's songs over writing alone. Harris frequently writes lyrics about mythology and history, as well as topics inspired by books and films, reflecting his interests and progressive rock influences.

In later years, Harris began to add backing vocals and keyboards to his duties in Iron Maiden, with his work on synthesisers becoming prominent for the first time on the 1986 album Somewhere in Time. He has played keyboards in the studio regularly since the 1998 album Virtual XI, though his bass technician Michael Kenney usually plays the keyboards during live concerts.

=== British Lion ===
In the early 1990s, Harris began to manage and collaborate with the hard rock band British Lion. This eventually resulted in the album British Lion, released in 2012. The album, consisting of 1970s-influenced hard rock songs, was written and recorded over a number of years around Iron Maiden's tour schedule. Speaking to Kerrang!, Harris stated that he considers the record to be "more of a side-project" than a solo album, as he is more "comfortable in a band environment." The album reached the charts in more than ten countries, with Kerrang! deeming it "a brilliant album", and describing it as "the sound of an incredibly talented songwriter stepping outside of what he'd normally do and indulging himself in something a bit different with a group of excellent musicians."

In an interview with Classic Rock, Harris stated that he planned to release more albums under the British Lion name and to tour with the band. The band completed two European club tours in 2013 and 2014, Their second album, titled The Burning, was released in 2020. They then headlined their first U.S. tour in January and February of that year. Following a handful of one off appearances the band went on a full European headlining tour in August 2025 and a U.K. tour in November and December.

== Artistry ==
=== Technique ===
He has a "galloping" playing style: usually an eighth note followed by two sixteenth notes at fast tempo, or eighth note triplets, which he plays with two fingers, rather than using a plectrum. He stated in an interview with Guitar World "He often relies on using his fingernails on his plucking fingers to deliver his famous, trebly tone". Before playing, Harris often chalks his fingers to make such fast patterns easier to play, as shown on the bonus DVD for the A Matter of Life and Death album. Harris's playing is often unusually prominent in the mix on Iron Maiden's recordings; he generally uses a tone with a treble-heavy EQ and compression to accentuate the attack on the strings. Iron Maiden guitarist Janick Gers has commented that "Steve taught himself in a way that nobody can really copy it. People say it's like a lead guitar, but it's not. It gives the band a basis and it moves around quite a lot, but it's the tone that he has. Steve has a way of hearing things and a tone that isn't normally associated with a bass, it's more like a rhythm guitar."

=== Influences ===
As a songwriter, Harris was influenced by the progressive rock bands of the 1970s, as well as early hard rock and heavy metal bands. His influences include Black Sabbath, Deep Purple, Emerson, Lake & Palmer, Genesis, Jethro Tull, Led Zeppelin, Golden Earring, Pink Floyd, Thin Lizzy, UFO, Uriah Heep, Wishbone Ash, and Yes. Speaking about the early Iron Maiden sound, Steve Harris described the band as using twin-guitar harmonies inspired by Wishbone Ash and Thin Lizzy, complex time and mood changes from Genesis and Jethro Tull, and the dark melodic elements of Black Sabbath, Deep Purple, and Led Zeppelin. Harris' bass playing was influenced by Rush's Geddy Lee, Yes's Chris Squire and UFO's Pete Way, among others.

=== Equipment ===
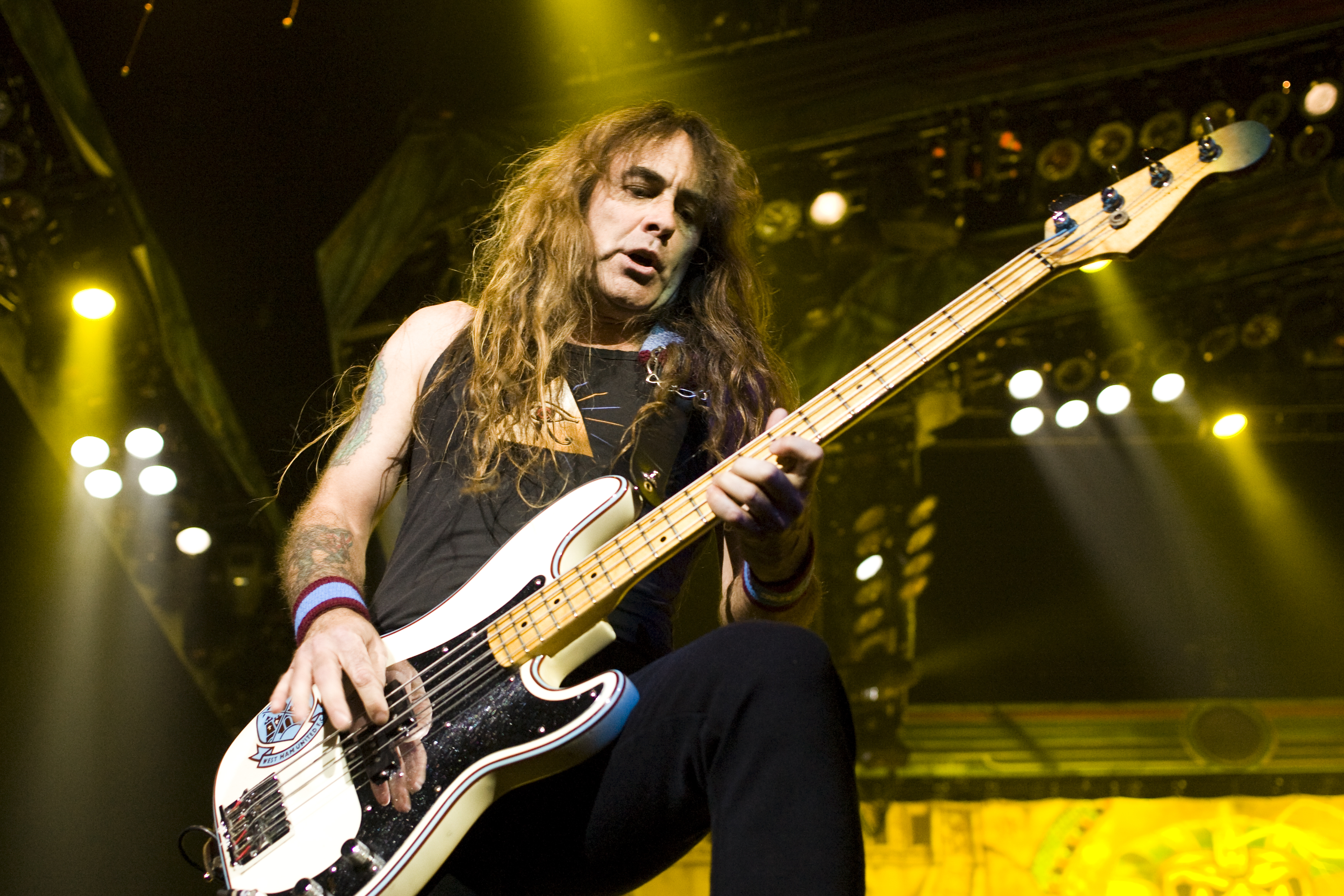
Harris in 2008

Since Iron Maiden's beginning to the present day, Harris plays a specially-painted Fender Precision Bass, featured on every Iron Maiden album; the instrument has gone through a total of four colour changes since he began using it. Originally white, it was then changed to black prior to the band's first album, followed by blue sparkle and finally white with claret and blue pinstriping with the West Ham United F.C. crest. Harris has had his bass modified to include a mirrored scratchplate, Badass bridges and Seymour Duncan custom Steve Harris Signature SPB-4 pickups and uses his own signature set of RotoSound flatwound strings. In 2009, Fender issued a signature Steve Harris Precision bass, featuring an alder body, a blue-sparkle finish, mirrored scratchplate, Seymour Duncan SPB-1 pick-ups and a Badass II bridge. In 2015, Fender released a revised model of the signature bass, which now features a maple body, a white finish with blue pinstripes and the West Ham crest, a Fender High Mass bridge and a Seymour Duncan SPB-4 Steve Harris signature pick-up, with the pick-up also being sold separately.

Around 1981, Harris compared a number of different amplifiers and settled on the Hiwatt NCA 108, a solid-state head with a graphic equalizer. A botched attempt to convert the NCA 108 for use on a rack led it to fail while touring, so Harris had the company Alectron build rack-format copies that Harris used for the next forty years. Harris eventually had his original NCA 108 fully rebuilt for use on a rack and it was added to his rig, with Harris slightly favoring it over the Alectron copies. He has also used Trace Elliot preamps. Harris runs his setup into C-Audio SR707 power amps, which feed two stacks of Marshall 800-series 4x12 speaker cabinets loaded with EVM 12L speakers. Harris has used wireless transmitters like the Sony WRT 27 and Shure Axient. He uses a custom selector—built by Pete Cornish—to select which bass is active and to balance their volumes. Harris also has a signature preamp pedal, the Tech 21 SH1 Steve Harris Signature Sansamp, which is based on the tone of his Hiwatt/Alectron amplifiers. The SH1 was designed for Harris to use at smaller venues with British Lion, but it is also used as a direct line to front of house for Iron Maiden shows.

=== Recognition ===
Harris had been named among the best and most influential heavy metal bassists of all time. Harris was ranked #1 on Loudwire’s list of the Best Hard Rock + Metal Guitarists of All Time, the publication also ranked him #1 on their list of the Top Hard Rock + Metal Bassists of All Time. He ranked #4 on Guitar World’s list of 20 metal bassists who took heavy bass in new directions. Harris was ranked #8 on Ultimate Guitar’s Best Bassist of All Time, and #5 on Classic Rocks Best Bassist Ever. Frank Bello of Anthrax has cited Harris as one of his influences.

== Production ==
Harris has played an increasing role in mixing the Iron Maiden's albums and co-produced most of their output since the 1990s, usually in conjunction with Kevin Shirley. During the 1990s, the band often recorded at a studio he owned at the time, located in a barn on his property named Barnyard Studios That home studio has not been used for Iron Maiden albums since singer Bruce Dickinson rejoined the band in 2000, with Dickinson determining that it was too small.

Harris also directs and edits many of the band's live videos, beginning with Maiden England in 1989. Although not intending to, Harris edited the Rock in Rio DVD as he was unsatisfied with the results produced by the band's hired production crew. In undertaking the project, Harris had to teach himself how to use digital editing software with equipment he had installed in Barnyard Studios, and went on to edit Iron Maiden's next DVD, Death on the Road. On top of this, he has contributed to the production of thirteen of the band's music videos, with "Infinite Dreams", "Holy Smoke", "Tailgunner", and "Bring Your Daughter... to the Slaughter" being directed and edited by Harris alone.

In 2002 he produced the album Blown for the British band Deeds.

== Personal life ==
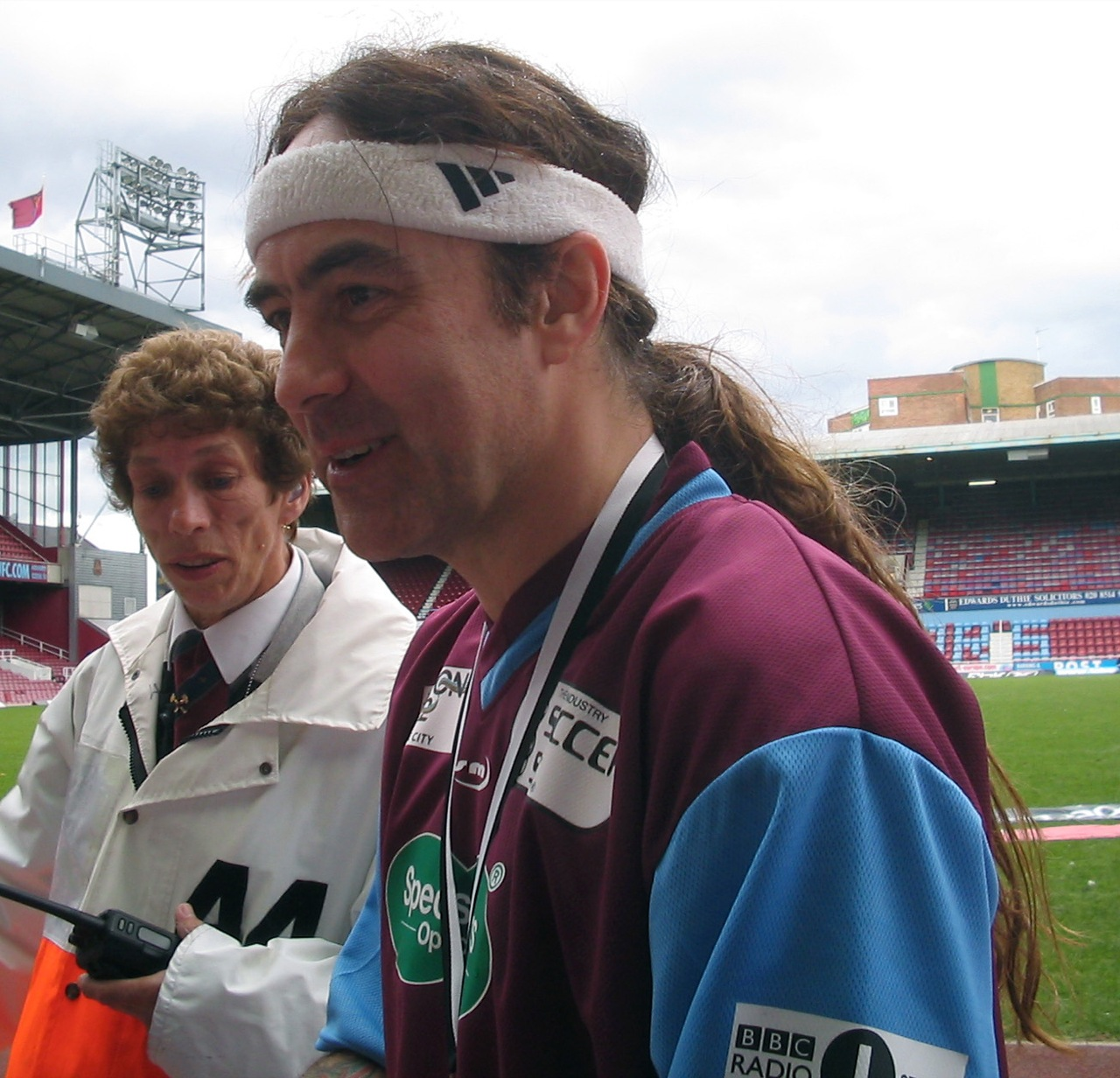
Harris at West Ham United's Boleyn Ground during Soccer Six 2005

Harris met psychotherapist Lorraine Jury in 1977, they later married and had four children. Harris's daughter, Lauren, is a singer and classically trained actor who supported Iron Maiden with her solo band in 2006 and 2008. In 2008, she released a solo album entitled Calm Before the Storm, after which she formed the band Six Hour Sundown. She later joined Kingdom of I, Harris's son George plays guitar for the Raven Age, who opened for Iron Maiden on three international tours. His daughter Kerry works as a Production Assistant for Iron Maiden, and his younger daughter Faye is a fashion writer for HuffPost. In 2024, Faye married Tyrone Wood, the son of Rolling Stones guitarist Ronnie Wood.

Harris and Jury divorced in 1993. Harris later said this was "probably the toughest time I've ever faced," and the changes in his personal life are credited with inspiring the mood of the following Iron Maiden album, 1995's The X Factor. Harris has since fathered two more children with his current partner Emma.

Starting in the 1980s, Harris owned a Grade II listed building in Sheering, Essex, on the grounds of which he built his own recording and editing studio. In November 2012, the nine-acre property was put on sale. The property was sold in March 2022, having been on the market for a number of years, for £3,950,000. Harris now lives primarily in the Bahamas.

A keen footballer, Harris played for amateur clubs as a child and was later scouted by Wally St Pier and asked to train for West Ham United, of whom he has been a fan since he was nine years old. Although he had aspired to play professionally up to that point, Harris would eventually realise that "it wasn't really what [he] wanted to do." Nevertheless, Harris still plays football regularly with his own team the Maidonians, and still supports West Ham, staying in contact with the club and displaying their crest on his most-used Precision Bass. Harris also plays tennis, and is a photographer.

== Discography ==
=== Iron Maiden ===
- Iron Maiden (1980)
- Killers (1981)
- The Number of the Beast (1982)
- Piece of Mind (1983)
- Powerslave (1984)
- Somewhere in Time (1986)
- Seventh Son of a Seventh Son (1988)
- No Prayer for the Dying (1990)
- Fear of the Dark (1992)
- The X Factor (1995)
- Virtual XI (1998)
- Brave New World (2000)
- Dance of Death (2003)
- A Matter of Life and Death (2006)
- The Final Frontier (2010)
- The Book of Souls (2015)
- Senjutsu (2021)

=== Steve Harris' British Lion ===
- British Lion (2012)
- The Burning (2020)

=== Lauren Harris ===
- Calm Before the Storm (2008)

=== Deeds ===
- Blown (record producer, 2002)

== Awards and honors ==
See also List of awards and nominations received by Iron Maiden

Year	Award	Category	Result
1991	Metal Hammer	Best Bassist Ever	Won
1992	Žebřík Music Awards	Best International Musician	Won
1993	Žebřík Music Awards	Best International Musician	2nd
1994	Žebřík Music Awards	Best International Musician	Nominated
1994	Kerrang!	Best Bassist Ever	Won
1995	Kerrang!	Kreativity Award	Won
1995	Žebřík Music Awards	Best International Musician	Nominated
1996	Žebřík Music Awards	Best International Musician	Nominated
2000	BURRN!	Best Bassist	Won
2000	Metal Edge	Bassist of the Year	Nominated
2005	Hollywood's RockWalk	As a member of Iron Maiden	Won
2006	BURRN!	Best Bassist	Won
2006	BURRN!	Best Songwriter	Won
2013	Revolver Golden Gods Awards	Best Bassist	Nominated
2017	Loudwire Music Awards	Bassist of the Year	Won
2026	Rock and Roll Hall of Fame	As a member of Iron Maiden	Inducted

- In 2016 Harris and Iron Maiden were given the titles of Honorary Visitors of the Country Award in El Salvador.
- In 2019 Harris along with the rest of Iron Maiden received the Relief Salon De Los Pasos Perdidos – State prize for individual Iron Maiden musicians for their contribution to the development of the country's culture and music. For the first time ever awarded to a foreign artist.

== Literature ==
- Wall, Mick (2004). Iron Maiden: Run to the Hills, the Authorised Biography (third ed.). Sanctuary Publishing. ISBN 1-86074-542-3.
