= Iron Maiden discography =

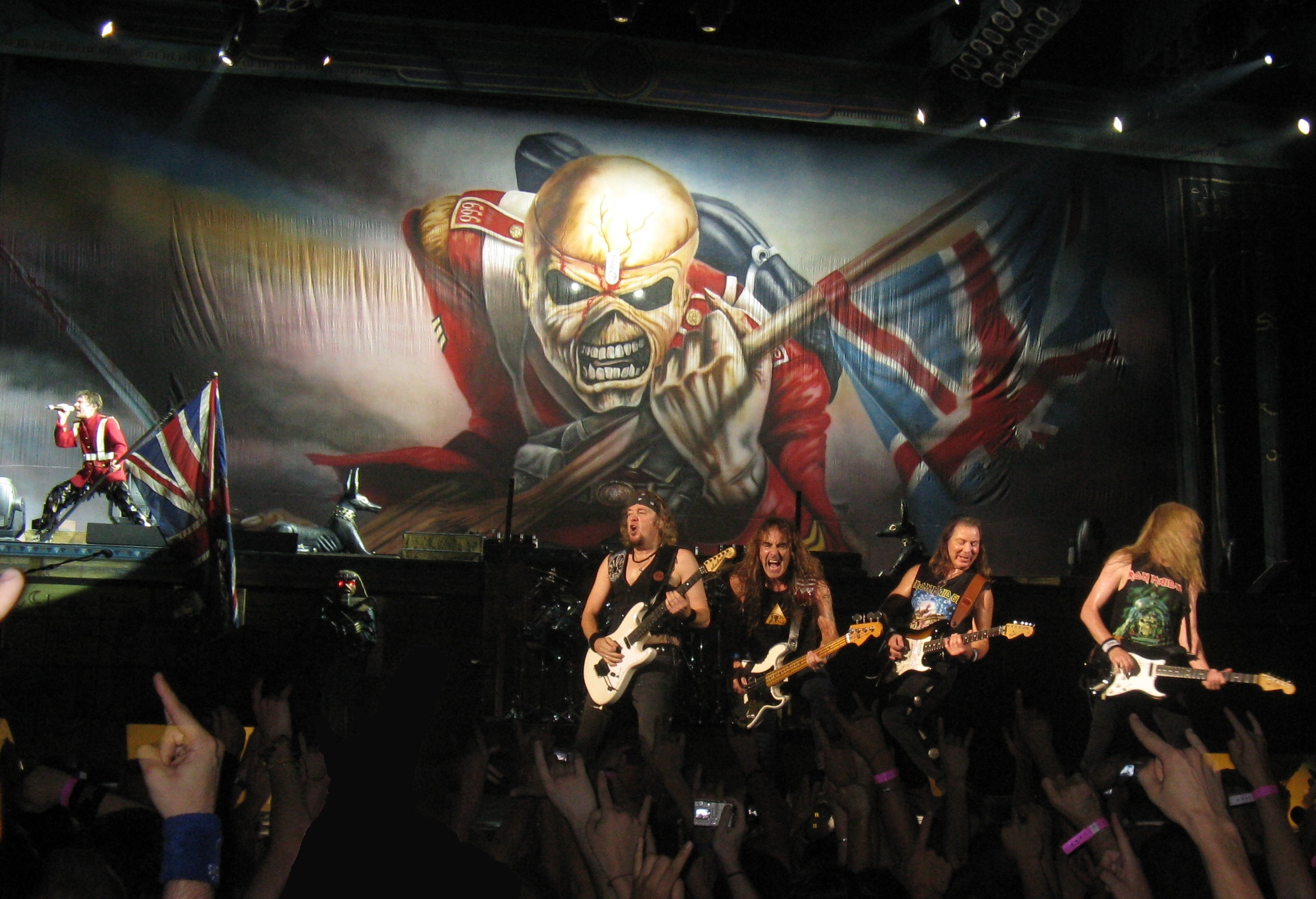
- Iron Maiden performing "The Trooper" live in Paris during the Somewhere Back in Time World Tour in 2008
- Studio albums: 17
- Extended plays: 4
- Live albums: 13
- Compilation albums: 7
- Singles: 47
- Video albums: 20
- Music videos: 42
- Box sets: 5

The discography of Iron Maiden, an English heavy metal band, consists of seventeen studio albums, as well as numerous live albums, compilations, EPs, singles, video albums, music videos, and box sets. After several personnel changes, they released their self-titled debut album in 1980 with vocalist Paul Di'Anno, guitarists Dave Murray and Dennis Stratton, bassist Steve Harris and drummer Clive Burr. The band quickly became one of the leading proponents of the new wave of British heavy metal movement.

Guitarist Adrian Smith replaced Stratton, and Killers was released in 1981. Later that year, vocalist Bruce Dickinson replaced Paul Di'Anno, marking the beginning of a series of top-ten high-impact releases. The Number of the Beast, became the band's first release to top the UK charts, and received a Platinum certification by the Recording Industry Association of America. Drummer Nicko McBrain replaced Clive Burr, and the band released Piece of Mind in 1983, followed by Powerslave (1984). Iron Maiden broadened their sound with the use of guitar synthesisers in Somewhere in Time (1986). Their following concept album, Seventh Son of a Seventh Son, was released in 1988, and also topped the UK charts.

The line-up remained unchanged until Adrian Smith left the band during the pre-production stage of their last Gold-certified album in the US, No Prayer for the Dying (1990); he was replaced by Janick Gers. Their next UK No. 1 album, Fear of the Dark, was released in 1992, after which Dickinson left the band in the following year. His replacement, Blaze Bayley, debuted in 1995 with The X Factor, an album that marked a decline in the band's career. The diminished fan interest in 1998 with Virtual XI prompted Bayley's departure.

Dickinson and Smith returned to the band in 1999, and a new album, Brave New World, was issued in 2000. Three years later, Dance of Death was released. In 2006 they released A Matter of Life and Death, which received, along with their two previous studio releases, a gold certification by the BPI. In 2010, Iron Maiden issued The Final Frontier, which was positively received by critics, and debuted at No. 1 in over twenty-eight countries, including the United Kingdom. Their sixteenth studio effort, The Book of Souls, was released on 4 September 2015 and became their fifth UK No. 1 album. The band’s seventeenth and most recent album Senjutsu was released in 2021 and topped the charts in multiple countries. Iron Maiden are considered one of the most influential and successful heavy metal bands in history, with The Sunday Times reporting in 2017 that the band have sold well over 100 million copies of their albums worldwide, despite little radio or television support. As of 2023 Iron Maiden have sold over 130 million copies of their albums worldwide. According to MD Daily Record all audio-visual catalogue of the band has sold over 200 million copies worldwide, including regular albums, singles, VHS, DVDs, and compilations. By 2022 their releases have been certified Silver, Gold and Platinum around 600 times worldwide.

== Albums ==
=== Studio albums ===
Title	Album details	Peak chart positions										Certifications (sales thresholds)
Title	Album details	UK	AUS	AUT	CAN	GER	NZ	NOR	SWE	SWI	US	Certifications (sales thresholds)
Iron Maiden	Released: 11 April 1980; Label: EMI (EMC–3330); Format: CD, CS, LP, 8T	4	200	—	—	34	—	—	27	38	—	BPI: Platinum; BVMI: Gold; MC: Platinum
Killers	Released: 2 February 1981; Label: EMI (EMC–3357); Format: CD, CS, LP, 8T	12	190	20	—	10	41	19	10	—	78	BPI: Gold; BVMI: Gold; MC: Platinum; RIAA: Gold; RMNZ: Gold; SWE: Gold
The Number of the Beast	Released: 29 March 1982; Label: EMI (EMC–3400); Format: CD, CS, LP, 8T	1	8	3	11	11	18	5	2	3	33	AUS: Platinum; IFPI AUT: Gold; MC: 3× Platinum; ESP: Gold; BVMI: Gold; RMNZ: Gold; SWI: Gold; BPI: 2× Platinum; RIAA: Platinum
Piece of Mind	Released: 16 May 1983; Label: EMI (EMA–800); Format: CD, CS, LP	3	17	10	10	8	2	5	4	2	14	BPI: Platinum; BVMI: Gold; MC: 2× Platinum; RIAA: Platinum; RMNZ: Gold
Powerslave	Released: 3 September 1984; Label: EMI (POWER–1); Format: CD, CS, LP	2	26	15	21	5	11	4	5	3	21	BPI: Gold; MC: 2× Platinum; BVMI: Gold; RIAA: Platinum; RMNZ: Gold
Somewhere in Time	Released: 29 September 1986; Label: EMI (EMC–3512); Format: CD, CS, LP	2	23	10	15	8	5	4	3	3	11	BPI: Gold; BVMI: Gold; MC 2× Platinum; RIAA: Platinum; RMNZ: Gold
Seventh Son of a Seventh Son	Released: 11 April 1988; Label: EMI (EMD–1006); Format: CD, CS, LP	1	19	6	11	4	3	3	3	2	12	BPI: Gold; BVMI: Gold; MC: Platinum; RIAA: Gold; RMNZ: Gold; SWI: Gold
No Prayer for the Dying	Released: 1 October 1990; Label: EMI (EMD–1017); Format: CD, CS, LP	2	23	19	27	7	17	4	3	3	17	BPI: Gold; BVMI: Gold; MC: Platinum; RIAA: Gold
Fear of the Dark	Released: 11 May 1992; Label: EMI (EMD–1032); Format: CD, CS, LP	1	11	8	12	5	4	3	5	5	12	BPI: Gold; BVMI: Gold; MC: Gold
The X Factor	Released: 2 October 1995; Label: EMI (7243–8–35819–2–4); Format: CD, CS, LP	8	64	19	—	16	—	25	4	27	147	BPI: Silver
Virtual XI	Released: 23 March 1998; Label: EMI (7243–4–93915–2–9); Format: CD, CS, LP	16	98	24	60	16	—	28	16	39	124	BPI: Silver
Brave New World	Released: 29 May 2000; Label: EMI (7243–5–26605–2–0); Format: CD, CS, LP, MD	7	33	10	23	3	—	4	1	9	39	BPI: Gold; BVMI: Gold; ESP: Gold; MC: Gold; RMNZ: Gold; SWE: Gold
Dance of Death	Released: 8 September 2003; Label: EMI (7243–5–92340–2–1); Format: CD, CS, LP, DVD-A	2	12	3	5	2	21	3	1	2	18	BPI: Gold; BVMI: Gold; SWE: Gold
A Matter of Life and Death	Released: 25 August 2006; Label: EMI (0946–3–72331–2–2); Format: CD, CS, LP	4	12	4	2	1	16	2	1	2	9	BPI: Gold; BVMI: Gold; MC: Gold; SWE: Gold; SWI: Gold
The Final Frontier	Released: 13 August 2010; Label: EMI (50999–6477722–1); Format: CD, LP, Digital download	1	2	1	1	1	1	1	1	1	4	BPI: Gold; BVMI: Gold; MC: Gold; RMNZ: Gold; SWE: Gold; SWI: Gold
The Book of Souls	Released: 4 September 2015; Label: Parlophone (0825646089246); Format: CD, LP, Digital download	1	2	1	2	1	2	1	1	1	4	BPI: Gold; BVMI: Gold; IFPI AUT: Gold; MC: Gold; RMNZ: Gold
Senjutsu	Released: 3 September 2021; Label: Parlophone; Format: CD, LP, Digital download	2	3	1	5	1	9	5	1	1	3	BPI: Gold; BVMI: Gold; ESP: Gold; SWE: Gold
"—" denotes releases that did not chart or were not released in that country.

=== Live albums ===
Title	Album details	Peak chart positions										Certifications
Title	Album details	UK	AUS	AUT	FIN	GER	NLD	NOR	SWE	SWI	US	Certifications
Live After Death	Released: 14 October 1985; Label: EMI (RIP–1); Format: CD, CS, LP	2	31	3	5	10	5	13	2	26	19	BPI: Gold; BVMI: Gold; IFPI AUT: Gold; MC: 2× Platinum; FIN: Platinum; NVPI: Gold; RIAA: Platinum; SWE: Gold
A Real Live One	Released: 22 March 1993; Label: EMI (0777–7–81456–2–2); Format: CD, CS, LP	3	48	11	6	25	45	—	30	25	106	BPI: Silver
A Real Dead One	Released: 18 October 1993; Label: EMI (0777–7–89248–2–1); Format: CD, CS, LP	12	138	—	12	50	97	—	14	37	140	BPI: Silver
Live at Donington	Released: 8 November 1993; Label: EMI (7243–8–27511–2–0); Format: CD, CS, LP	23	180	—	—	—	—	—	—	—	—	
Rock in Rio	Released: 25 March 2002; Label: EMI (7243–5–38643–0–9); Format: CD, CS, LP	15	85	17	8	13	43	14	14	17	186	BPI: Silver
BBC Archives	Released: 4 November 2002; Label: EMI (7243–5–41277–2–4); Format: CD; Released as part of the Eddie's Archive box set	—	—	—	—	—	—	—	—	—	—	—
Beast over Hammersmith	Released: 4 November 2002; Label: EMI (7243–541277–2–4); Format: CD; Released as part of the Eddie's Archive box set	—	—	—	—	—	—	—	—	—	—	—
Death on the Road	Released: 29 August 2005; Label: EMI (0946–3–36437–2–7); Format: CD, LP	22	119	23	5	17	39	12	7	17	—	BPI: Silver; ESP: Gold
Flight 666	Released: 25 May 2009; Label: EMI (50999–6977572–7); Format: CD, LP	15	66	36	14	6	50	22	25	24	34	BVMI: Gold; MC: Gold
En Vivo!	Released: 26 March 2012; Label: EMI (50999–301590–2–0); Format: CD, LP	19	91	17	8	4	42	16	11	19	80	—
Maiden England '88	Released: 25 March 2013; Label: EMI (50999–973–651–2–7); Format: CD, LP; Previously available as a bonus CD with a 1994 reissue of the Maiden England VHS	30	117	23	21	14	49	29	12	26	148	—
The Book of Souls: Live Chapter	Released: 17 November 2017; Label: Parlophone; Format: CD, LP	17	17	10	8	5	23	19	8	5	49	
Nights of the Dead, Legacy of the Beast: Live in Mexico City	Released: 20 November 2020; Label: Parlophone; Format: CD, LP, digital download, streaming	7	52	9	6	6	14	12	5	4	53	
"—" denotes releases that did not chart or were not released in that country.

=== Compilation albums ===
Title	Album details	Peak chart positions										Certifications
Title	Album details	UK	AUS	AUT	BEL (FL)	FIN	GER	NLD	NZ	SWE	US	Certifications
Best of the Beast	Released: 23 September 1996; Label: EMI (7243–8–53184–2–9); Format: CD, CS, LP, MD	16	58	41	28	8	26	25	37	11	—	BPI: Gold; BVMI: Gold; FIN: Gold; SWE: Platinum
Ed Hunter	Released: 17 May 1999; Label: EMI (7243–5–20520–0–4); Format: CD	—	—	—	—	27	94	69	—	43	—	UK: Silver
Best of the 'B' Sides	Released: 4 November 2002; Label: EMI (7243–5–41277–2–4); Format: CD; Released as part of the Eddie's Archive box set	—	—	—	—	—	—	—	—	—	—	—
Edward the Great	Released: 4 November 2002; Label: EMI (7243–5–43103–2–4); Format: CD, LP, CS	57	—	—	46	34	—	—	—	16	—	BPI: Gold; FIN: Gold; MC: Gold; SWE: Gold
The Essential Iron Maiden	Released: 12 July 2005; Label: Sanctuary (C2K–92832); Format: CD	—	—	—	—	—	—	—	—	—	—	BPI: Gold
Somewhere Back in Time: The Best of 1980–1989	Released: 12 May 2008; Label: EMI (50999–214–7072–1); Format: CD, LP	14	81	26	19	3	84	74	24	2	58	BPI: Platinum; FIN: Gold; RMMZ: Gold; SWE: Gold
From Fear to Eternity: The Best of 1990–2010	Released: 6 June 2011; Label: EMI (50999–0273622–8); Format: CD, LP, Digital download	19	91	22	26	11	19	45	16	6	86	BPI: Gold; BVMI: Gold
"—" denotes releases that did not chart or were not released in that country.

== Singles ==
Song	Year	Peak chart positions											Certifications (sales thresholds)	Album
Song	Year	UK	AUS	CAN	GER	IRE	NLD	NZ	NOR	SWE	SWI	US Main	Certifications (sales thresholds)	Album
"Running Free"	1980	34	—	—	—	—	—	35	—	—	—	—		Iron Maiden
"Sanctuary"	1980	29	—	—	—	—	—	—	—	—	—	—		Iron Maiden
"Women in Uniform"	1980	35	—	—	—	—	—	—	—	—	—	—		Non-album single
"Twilight Zone" / "Wrathchild"	1981	31	—	—	—	—	—	—	—	—	—	31		Killers
"Purgatory"	1981	52	—	—	—	—	—	—	—	—	—	—		Killers
"Run to the Hills"	1982	7	27	—	55	16	—	—	—	—	—	—	BPI: Platinum; ARIA: Platinum; RMNZ: Platinum	The Number of the Beast
"The Number of the Beast"	1982	18	—	—	—	19	—	—	—	—	—	—	BPI: Silver; ARIA: Gold; RMNZ: Gold	The Number of the Beast
"Flight of Icarus"	1983	11	93	—	—	14	—	—	—	—	—	8		Piece of Mind
"The Trooper"	1983	12	—	5	—	12	—	—	—	5	5	28	BPI: Gold; ARIA: Gold; ESP: Gold; RMNZ: Platinum	Piece of Mind
"2 Minutes to Midnight"	1984	11	—	—	70	10	—	13	—	—	—	25		Powerslave
"Aces High"	1984	20	—	—	—	29	—	22	—	—	—	—		Powerslave
"Running Free" (Live in 1985)	1985	19	—	—	—	12	—	—	—	—	—	—		Live After Death
"Run to the Hills" (Live in 1985)	1985	26	—	—	—	18	—	—	—	—	—	—		Live After Death
"Wasted Years"	1986	18	—	—	—	11	8	24	—	—	—	—		Somewhere in Time
"Stranger in a Strange Land"	1986	22	—	—	—	18	22	—	—	—	—	—		Somewhere in Time
"Can I Play with Madness"	1988	3	58	—	23	3	6	7	4	12	23	47		Seventh Son of a Seventh Son
"The Evil That Men Do"	1988	5	—	—	—	4	23	7	7	—	—	—		Seventh Son of a Seventh Son
"The Clairvoyant"	1988	6	—	—	—	7	70	37	—	—	—	—		Seventh Son of a Seventh Son
"Infinite Dreams" (Live in 1988)	1989	6	—	—	—	6	—	20	—	—	—	—		Maiden England '88
"Holy Smoke"	1990	3	93	—	—	4	25	25	—	—	20	—		No Prayer for the Dying
"Bring Your Daughter... to the Slaughter"	1990	1	155	—	—	6	17	47	—	—	19	—		No Prayer for the Dying
"Be Quick or Be Dead"	1992	2	47	—	32	10	26	12	3	15	15	—		Fear of the Dark
"From Here to Eternity"	1992	21	109	—	—	27	70	33	—	—	—	—		Fear of the Dark
"Wasting Love"	1992	—	132	—	—	—	—	—	—	—	—	—		Fear of the Dark
"Fear of the Dark" (Live in 1992)	1993	8	98	—	—	17	—	—	—	—	—	—	BPI: Silver; POL: Gold; ITA: Gold; RMNZ: Gold	A Real Live One
"Hallowed Be Thy Name" (Live in 1993)	1993	9	—	—	—	16	—	—	—	37	—	—		A Real Dead One
"Man on the Edge"	1995	10	—	—	—	—	—	—	18	23	—	—		The X Factor
"Lord of the Flies"	1996	—	169	—	—	—	—	—	—	—	—	—		The X Factor
"Virus"	1996	16	125	—	—	—	48	—	—	31	—	—		Best of the Beast
"The Angel and the Gambler"	1998	18	—	—	61	—	52	—	—	29	—	—		Virtual XI
"Futureal"	1998	—	—	—	—	—	—	—	—	—	—	—		Virtual XI
"The Wicker Man"	2000	9	104	4	38	35	45	—	9	5	83	19		Brave New World
"Out of the Silent Planet"	2000	20	—	—	13	—	87	—	—	35	—	—		Brave New World
"Run to the Hills" (Live in 2001)	2002	9	—	11	55	38	60	—	15	28	75	—		Rock in Rio
"Wildest Dreams"	2003	6	—	26	27	19	45	—	5	4	68	—		Dance of Death
"Rainmaker"	2003	13	—	7	36	33	98	—	—	35	94	—		Dance of Death
"The Number of the Beast" (2005 Reissue)	2005	3	—	12	76	11	98	—	13	40	42	—		The Number of the Beast
"The Trooper" (Live in 2003)	2005	5	—	12	78	16	12	—	34	5	61	—		Death on the Road
"The Reincarnation of Benjamin Breeg" (exceeded the length limit of some charts)	2006	—	—	—	39	18	—	—	9	1	74	—		A Matter of Life and Death
"Different World"	2006	3	—	—	40	39	—	—	—	52	—	—		A Matter of Life and Death
"El Dorado" (single released as a free download)	2010	—	—	—	—	—	—	—	—	—	—	—		The Final Frontier
"Satellite 15... The Final Frontier" (single released as a music video)	2010	—	—	—	—	—	—	—	—	—	—	—		The Final Frontier
"Coming Home" (single released as promo cd)	2011	—	—	—	—	—	—	—	—	—	—	—		The Final Frontier
"Speed of Light"	2015	—	—	—	—	—	—	—	—	—	—	—		The Book of Souls
"Empire of the Clouds"	2016	—	—	—	—	—	—	—	—	41^{[E]}	—	—		The Book of Souls
"The Writing on the Wall"	2021	—	—	—	—	—	—	—	—	— (Note: "The Writing on the Wall" did not enter the Swedish Singellista Chart, but peaked at number four on the Swedish Heatseeker Chart.)	—	16		Senjutsu
"Stratego"	2021	—	—	—	—	—	—	—	—	—	—	—		Senjutsu
"Stratego" (Live in 2022)	2022	—	—	—	—	—	—	—	—	—	—	—		Senjutsu
"Total Eclipse"	2022	—	—	—	—	—	—	—	—	—	—	—		The Number of the Beast / Beast over Hammersmith
"—" denotes releases that did not chart or were not released in that country.

E Appeared in the Swedish Albums Chart due to length.

== Extended plays ==
Title	EP details	Charts						Certifications
Title	EP details	UK	FIN	GER	IRE	US	US Rock	Certifications
The Soundhouse Tapes	Released: 9 November 1979; Label: Rock Hard (ROK–1); Format: 7-inch, LP, CD	—	—	—	—	—	—	—
Live!! +one	Released: 25 December 1980; Label: EMI (EMS–41001); Format: CS, LP; Released in Japan and Greece only	—	—	—	—	—	—	—
Maiden Japan	Released: 14 September 1981; Label: EMI (12EMI–5219); Format: 12-inch, CS	43	—	—	—	89	—	UK: Silver; CAN: Platinum
No More Lies	Released: 29 March 2004; Label: EMI (7–24354–84170–5); Format: CD	—	3	36	25	—	30	—

== Box sets ==
Title	Details	Notes
The First Ten Years	Released: 24 February—28 April 1990; Label: EMI; Format: 12-inch, CD	The first 20 singles ("Running Free" through "Infinite Dreams Live" including the Maiden Japan EP) reissued on 10 individual CDs or double 12" vinyl records. Each volume includes two singles (with all their B-sides), and a commentary track from drummer Nicko McBrain titled "Listen with Nicko!".; A box to house the 10 volumes (either 12" or CD) was available by mail-order.; CAN: Gold
Eddie's Head	Released: 30 November 1998; Label: EMI (7243–4–97999–0–5); Format: CD	This limited-edition box set contains all the band's studio and live albums up to Live at Donington as remastered, enhanced CDs (Complete with full lyrics, artworks, photos, and multimedia sections, plus non-LP singles added as bonus tracks where appropriate).; The CDs were also available individually; A Real Live One and A Real Dead One combined together as A Real Live Dead One
Eddie's Archive	Released: 4 November 2002; Label: EMI (7243–5–41277–2–4); Format: CD	Featuring three double discs, this limited-edition box set contains 77 remastered rare recordings, and most of it previously unreleased on any format.
Picture Disc Collection	Released: 15 October 2012; Label: EMI (5–099941–648001); Format: LP	Between October 2012 and February 2013, the band re-issued a boxed set of their first seven studio releases and their first live album, Live After Death (1985), on picture disc vinyl.
The Complete Albums Collection	Released: 13 October 2014; Label: Parlophone (8–25646–22290–2), BMG/INgrooves (US); Format: LP	Another box set of the band's first seven studio albums and first live album (Live After Death), this time reissued on heavyweight 180g black vinyl. In addition to the albums, all of the group's 1980s singles were released on 7-inch black vinyl.

== Videography ==
=== Video albums ===
Title	Album details	Peak chart positions										Certifications
Title	Album details	UK	AUS	FIN	GER	NLD	NOR	POR	SPA	SWI	US	Certifications
Live at the Rainbow	Released: 11 May 1981; Label: PMI (MVR–99–0018–2); Format: VHS	—	—	—	—	—	—	—	—	—	—	—
Video Pieces	Released: September 1983; Label: PMI (MVS–99–0002–2); Format: LD, VHS	—	—	—	—	—	—	—	—	—	5	US: Gold
Behind the Iron Curtain	Released: October 1984; Label: PMI (MVR–99–0039–2); Format: LD, VHS	1	2	2	2	1	2	3	3	3	2	US: Gold
Live After Death	Released: 23 October 1985; Label: PMI (MVN–99–1094–2); Format: LD, VHS	1	1	1	1	1	2	2	1	1	1	UK: Platinum; CAN: 2× Platinum; ESP: Gold; US: Platinum
12 Wasted Years	Released: October 1987; Label: PMI (MVN–99–1152–2); Format: LD, VHS	1	3	2	1	1	1	1	3	2	2	US: Gold
Maiden England	Released: 8 November 1989; Label: PMI (MVN–99–1195–3); Format: LD, VHS, CD	1	1	3	2	1	1	1	1	2	1	UK: 3 × Platinum; CAN: Platinum; US: Platinum
The First Ten Years: The Videos	Released: 27 November 1990; Label: PMI (MVN–99–1246–3); Format: LD, VHS	1	4	2	3	3	4	2	2	3	—	UK: Platinum; CAN: Gold
From There to Eternity	Released: October 1992; Label: SMV (19V–49132); Format: VHS	—	—	—	—	—	—	—	—	—	2	—
Donington Live 1992	Released: 10 November 1993; Label: PMI (MVN–49–1156–3); Format: VHS, LD	1	2	3	1	2	2	1	1	1	3	
Raising Hell	Released: 5 September 1994; Label: PMI (MVN–49–1264–3); Format: LD, VHS	1	2	3	3	3	4	3	3	2	1	—
Classic Albums: Iron Maiden – The Number of the Beast	Released: 26 November 2001; Label: Eagle Vision (EREDV229); Format: DVD, VHS, UMD	2	—	—	3	—	9	—	2	4	—	AUS: Gold
Rock in Rio	Released: 10 June 2002; Label: Sanctuary (SVE5001); Format: DVD, VHS, UMD	1	3	3	2	—	2	—	—	—	2	AUS: Gold; CAN: 2× Platinum; GER: Gold; NLD: Gold; UK: Platinum; US: Platinum
Visions of the Beast	Released: 2 June 2003; Label: EMI (7243–4904039–7); Format: DVD	—	9	1	41	—	1	—	—	—	3	AUS: Platinum; CAN: 3× Platinum; FIN: 2× Platinum; GER: Gold; ESP: Platinum; UK: Platinum; US: 2× Platinum
The History of Iron Maiden – Part 1: The Early Days	Released: 8 November 2004; Label: EMI (7243–5–44317–9–1); Format: DVD	3	32	1	76	23	2	12	1	—	2	AUS: Gold; CAN: Platinum; FIN: Platinum; ESP: Gold; UK: Gold; US: Platinum
Death on the Road	Released: 6 February 2006; Label: EMI (0946–3–36437–9–6); Format: DVD	1	3	1	—	—	1	—	2	78	14	AUS: Gold; FIN: Gold; ESP: Gold
The History of Iron Maiden – Part 2: Live After Death	Released: 4 February 2008; Label: EMI (0094637952290); Format: DVD	1	1	1	1	1	2	2	1	1	2	AUS: Platinum; CAN: Platinum; FIN: Gold; GER: Gold; NLD: Gold; UK: Gold; US: Platinum
Iron Maiden: Flight 666	Released: 25 May 2009; Label: EMI (50999–6981449–5); Format: Blu-ray, DVD	1	1	1	1	3	1	2	2	1	1	AUS: Platinum; CAN: 5× Platinum; FIN: Platinum; GER: Platinum; NLD: Platinum; UK: Gold; US: Platinum
En Vivo!	Released: 26 March 2012; Label: EMI (50999–301597–9–2); Format: Blu-ray, DVD	1	1	1	1	2	1	3	1	2	1	AUS: Gold; CAN: 2× Platinum; FIN: Platinum; GER: Gold; NLD: Gold; UK: Platinum; US: Platinum
The History of Iron Maiden – Part 3: Maiden England '88	Released: 25 March 2013; Label: EMI (50999–973317–9–7); Format: DVD	2	3	2	2	2	1	8	1	2	1	CAN: Gold; US: Gold
The Book of Souls: Live Chapter	Released: 17 November 2017; Label: Parlophone; Format: Digital download	—	—	—	—	—	—	—	—	—	—	—
"—" denotes releases that did not chart or were not released in that country.

=== Music videos ===
Year	Title	Director(s)
1980	"Women in Uniform"	Brian Grant
1981	"Wrathchild" (Live in 1980)	Dave Hillier
1982	"Run to the Hills"	David Mallet
1982	"The Number of the Beast"	David Mallet
1983	"Flight of Icarus"	Jim Yukich
1983	"The Trooper"	Jim Yukich
1984	"2 Minutes to Midnight"	Tony Halton
1984	"Aces High"	Jim Yukich
1985	"Running Free" (Live in 1985)	Jim Yukich
1986	"Wasted Years"	Jim Yukich
1986	"Stranger in a Strange Land"	Julian Caidan
1988	"Can I Play with Madness"	Julian Doyle
1988	"The Evil That Men Do"	Toby Philips, Steve Harris
1988	"The Clairvoyant"	Julian Caiden, Steve Harris
1989	"Infinite Dreams" (Live in 1988)	Steve Harris
1990	"Holy Smoke"	Steve Harris
1990	"Tailgunner"	Steve Harris
1990	"Bring Your Daughter... to the Slaughter"	Steve Harris
1992	"Be Quick or Be Dead"	Wing Ko
1992	"From Here to Eternity"	Ralph Ziman
1992	"Wasting Love"	Samuel Bayer
1993	"Fear of the Dark" (Live in 1992)	Samuel Bayer
1993	"Hallowed Be Thy Name" (Live in 1992)	Samuel Bayer
1995	"Man on the Edge"	Wing Ko
1996	"Afraid to Shoot Strangers" (Live in 1995)	Steve Lazarus, Steve Harris
1996	"Lord of the Flies"	Steve Lazarus, Steve Harris
1996	"Virus"	Steve Lazarus, Steve Harris
1998	"The Angel and the Gambler"	Simon Hilton
1998	"Futureal"	Steve Lazarus
2000	"The Wicker Man"	Dean Karr
2000	"Out of the Silent Planet"	David Pattenden, Trevor Thompson
2000	"Brave New World" (Live in 2001)	Dean Karr
2003	"Wildest Dreams"	Howard Greenhalgh
2003	"Rainmaker"	Howard Greenhalgh
2005	"No More Lies" (Live in 2003)	Mathew Amos
2006	"The Reincarnation of Benjamin Breeg"	Mathew Amos
2006	"Different World"	Howard Greenhalgh
2010	"Satellite 15... The Final Frontier"	Nick Scott Studios
2015	"Speed of Light"	Llexi Leon
2021	"The Writing on the Wall"	Nicos Livesey
2021	"Stratego"	Gustaf Holtenäs
2022	"Stratego" (Live in 2022)	Iron Maiden
