= Edward the Great =

Compilation album by Iron Maiden
- Released: 4 November 2002
- Recorded: 1982–2001/2003 (2005 reissue)
- Genre: Heavy metal
- Length: 74:04
- Label: EMI

Iron Maiden chronology
Best of the 'B' Sides (2002)	Edward the Great (2002)	Dance of Death (2003)

Professional ratings
Review scores
Source	Rating
AllMusic	4/5 stars

Edward the Great: The Greatest Hits is Iron Maiden's third "best-of album", originally released on 4 November 2002. Unlike the band's other works by the group collecting together songs from different albums, such as Best of the Beast, Edward the Great does not feature any material from the group's first two albums, which featured Paul Di'Anno as vocalist, but does include material from Blaze Bayley's five-year tenure with the band.

== Background ==
According to Mick Wall, the collection was controversial amongst fans as it was released not long after previous compilations such as Best of the Beast and Ed Hunter. Bassist and founder member Steve Harris comments, "We did get a bit of flak for the Edward the Great album but it wasn't aimed at the hardcore fan, it was aimed at the peripheral people who've heard the name or seen the name on a T-shirt and wouldn't know which record to pick up." To satisfy "the real collector", the band released the Eddie's Archive box set simultaneously.

In 2005, a revised edition was released in Europe, Asia and South America with an updated track-listing. The new version coincided with the release of The Essential Iron Maiden compilation, released solely in North America, and featured songs from the Dance of Death album as well as an alternate live version of "Fear of the Dark". The updated CD also added the song "Brave New World" from the album of the same name and the booklet included a new foreword by Iron Maiden manager Rod Smallwood, replacing the original foreword by founding member Steve Harris. The album cover does not differentiate between the two editions.

== Track listing ==
=== Original track listing (2002) ===
Original track listing
No.	Title	Writer(s)	Original album	Length
1.	"Run to the Hills"	Steve Harris	1982 ~ The Number of the Beast	3:55
2.	"The Number of the Beast"	Harris	1982 ~ The Number of the Beast	4:52
3.	"Flight of Icarus"	Bruce Dickinson, Adrian Smith	1983 ~ Piece of Mind	3:52
4.	"The Trooper"	Harris	1983 ~ Piece of Mind	4:11
5.	"2 Minutes to Midnight"	Smith, Dickinson	1984 ~ Powerslave	6:00
6.	"Wasted Years"	Smith	1986 ~ Somewhere in Time	5:06
7.	"Can I Play With Madness"	Smith, Dickinson, Harris	1988 ~ Seventh Son of a Seventh Son	3:31
8.	"The Evil That Men Do"	Smith, Dickinson, Harris	1988 ~ Seventh Son of a Seventh Son	4:34
9.	"The Clairvoyant"	Harris	1988 ~ Seventh Son of a Seventh Son	4:27
10.	"Infinite Dreams"	Harris	1988 ~ Seventh Son of a Seventh Son	6:10
11.	"Holy Smoke"	Harris, Dickinson	1990 ~ No Prayer for the Dying	3:48
12.	"Bring Your Daughter... to the Slaughter"	Dickinson	1990 ~ No Prayer for the Dying	4:44
13.	"Man on the Edge"	Blaze Bayley, Janick Gers	1995 ~ The X Factor	4:12
14.	"Futureal"	Harris, Bayley	1998 ~ Virtual XI	2:55
15.	"The Wicker Man"	Smith, Harris, Dickinson	2000 ~ Brave New World	4:34
16.	"Fear of the Dark" (Live in Rock in Rio, Brazil 2001)	Harris	2002 ~ Rock in Rio (1992 ~ Fear of the Dark)	8:04
Total length:				74:55

=== Revised track listing (2005) ===
Revised track listing
No.	Title	Writer(s)	Original album	Length
1.	"Run to the Hills"	Harris	1982 ~ The Number of the Beast	3:55
2.	"The Number of the Beast"	Harris	1982 ~ The Number of the Beast	4:52
3.	"The Trooper"	Harris	1983 ~ Piece of Mind	4:11
4.	"Flight of Icarus"	Smith, Dickinson	1983 ~ Piece of Mind	3:52
5.	"2 Minutes to Midnight"	Smith, Dickinson	1984 ~ Powerslave	6:00
6.	"Wasted Years"	Smith	1986 ~ Somewhere in Time	5:06
7.	"Can I Play With Madness"	Smith, Dickinson, Harris	1988 ~ Seventh Son of a Seventh Son	3:31
8.	"The Evil That Men Do"	Smith, Dickinson, Harris	1988 ~ Seventh Son of a Seventh Son	4:34
9.	"Bring Your Daughter... to the Slaughter"	Dickinson	1990 ~ No Prayer for the Dying	4:44
10.	"Man on the Edge"	Bayley, Gers	1995 ~ The X Factor	4:12
11.	"Futureal"	Harris, Bayley	1998 ~ Virtual XI	2:55
12.	"The Wicker Man"	Smith, Harris, Dickinson	2000 ~ Brave New World	4:34
13.	"Brave New World"	Dave Murray, Harris, Dickinson	2000 ~ Brave New World	6:18
14.	"Wildest Dreams"	Smith, Harris	2003 ~ Dance of Death	3:52
15.	"Rainmaker"	Murray, Harris, Dickinson	2003 ~ Dance of Death	3:48
16.	"Fear of the Dark" (Live in Westfalenhallen, Germany 2003)	Harris	2005 ~ Death on the Road (1992 ~ Fear of the Dark)	7:28
Total length:				73:52

== Personnel ==
Production and performance credits are adapted from the album liner notes.

Iron Maiden

- Bruce Dickinson – vocals
- Dave Murray – guitars
- Janick Gers – guitars ("Holy Smoke", "Bring Your Daughter... to the Slaughter", "Man on the Edge", "Futureal", "The Wicker Man", "Fear of the Dark", "Brave New World", "Wildest Dreams" and "Rainmaker")
- Adrian Smith – guitars (except "Holy Smoke", "Bring Your Daughter... to the Slaughter", "Man on the Edge" and "Futureal")
- Steve Harris – bass, producer ("Man on the Edge" and "Futureal"), co-producer ("The Wicker Man", "Fear of the Dark", "Brave New World", "Wildest Dreams" and "Rainmaker")
- Nicko McBrain – drums
- Clive Burr – drums ("Run to the Hills" and "The Number of the Beast")
- Blaze Bayley – vocals ("Man on the Edge" and "Futureal")

Production

- Martin Birch – producer (except "Man on the Edge", "Futureal", "The Wicker Man", "Fear of the Dark", "Brave New World", "Wildest Dreams" and "Rainmaker")
- Nigel Green – producer ("Man on the Edge" and "Futureal")
- Kevin Shirley – producer ("The Wicker Man", "Fear of the Dark", "Brave New World", "Wildest Dreams" and "Rainmaker")
- Simon Heyworth – remastering (except "Man on the Edge", "Futureal", "The Wicker Man", "Fear of the Dark", "Brave New World", "Wildest Dreams" and "Rainmaker"), mastering ("Man on the Edge")
- Ronal Whelan – mastering ("Futureal")
- George Marino – mastering ("The Wicker Man", "Brave New World" and "Fear of the Dark" – 2002 edition)
- Tim Young – mastering ("Wildest Dreams" and "Rainmaker")
- Howie Weinberg – mastering ("Fear of the Dark" – 2005 edition)
- Tom Adams – sleeve illustration
- Peacock – art direction, design
- Dimo Safari – photography
- Simon Fowler – photography
- Ross Halfin – photography
- Rod Smallwood – management
- Andy Taylor – management
- Merck Mercuriadis – management

== Charts ==
Chart (2002–2003)	Peak position
Belgian Albums (Ultratop Flanders)	46
Finnish Albums (Suomen virallinen lista)	34
Japanese Albums (Oricon)	242
Swedish Albums (Sverigetopplistan)	16
UK Albums (OCC)	57

== Certifications ==
Region	Certification	Certified units/sales
Canada (Music Canada)	Gold	50,000^{^}
Finland (Musiikkituottajat)	Gold	15,201
Sweden (GLF)	Gold	30,000^{^}
United Kingdom (BPI)	Gold	100,000^{^}
^{^} Shipments figures based on certification alone.
