= Death on the Road =

2005 live album by Iron Maiden

Live album and video by Iron Maiden
- Released: 29 August 2005
- Recorded: 24 November 2003
- Venues: Westfalenhallen, Dortmund
- Genre: Heavy metal
- Length: 94:25
- Label: EMI
- Director: Steve Harris
- Producer: Kevin Shirley

Iron Maiden chronology
The Essential Iron Maiden (2005)	Death on the Road (2005)	A Matter of Life and Death (2006)

Iron Maiden video chronology
The Early Days (2004)	Death on the Road (2006)	Live After Death (2008)

Singles from Death on the Road
- 1. "The Trooper" Released: 15 August 2005

Death on the Road is a live album and video released by English heavy metal band Iron Maiden on 29 August 2005 on CD and vinyl, and on 6 February 2006 on DVD. The album was recorded at Westfalenhallen in Dortmund, Germany on 24 November 2003, during the Dance of Death World Tour.

The release performed well in the national charts of several countries; Finland (no. 5), Sweden (no. 7), Norway (no. 12), France (no. 14), Italy (no. 17), Switzerland (no. 17), Spain (no. 18), United Kingdom (no. 22), Ireland (no. 27), the Netherlands (no. 39) and India (no.29).

== Background ==
The video was released in a 3 DVD set, with the first two representing the concert footage in 5.1 Digital audio and stereo and the final containing special features, including a documentary and the promo videos for "Wildest Dreams" and "Rainmaker".

The 70-minute documentary, directed by Matthew Amos, shows the recording of the Dance of Death album at Sarm West Studios, London and the subsequent preparations for the following tour, including interviews with the majority of the band's road crew. Additional and extended interviews with crew and fans (recorded at Earls Court, London) were also included as individual films, entitled "Life on the Road" and "The Fans". The documentary contains the first ever released footage of the band in the recording studio.

Following the original 2006 DVD release, the band noted that several fans had complained about playback issues with the stereo disc, and stated that they would investigate the issue. A week later, the US release date for the DVD was postponed from 21 February 2006 to 30 January 2007, due to "unforeseen production issues".

The cover was designed by Melvyn Grant.

The version of "Fear of the Dark" on this release was later included in the Edward the Great 2005 re-release.

== Reception ==
Professional ratings
Review scores
Source	Rating
AllMusic	3/5 stars
Classic Rock (DVD)	9/10
Guitarist (DVD)	5/5 stars
Kerrang!	4/5
Kerrang! (DVD)	5/5
Q (DVD)	4/5 stars
Record Collector (DVD)	5/5 stars
Terrorizer	7/10

Reviews for the album were generally positive, with Kerrang! deeming it "very nearly the ultimate Iron Maiden live album," commenting that the release proves that the band "are as exciting, relevant and unique in 2005 as they were two decades ago." AllMusic, however, were more critical of the album, remarking that "longtime fans do not need any more live versions of "Number of the Beast," "Hallowed Be Thy Name," "Run to the Hills," or "The Trooper,"" although also stating that the band lays "waste [to] any notions that they can't hold themselves to the performance standards of their younger days." Guy Strachan praised the band for "capturing...the raw aggression of the band's delivery" but also suggested that "while it does do a very good job at capturing a good Maiden show for posterity, by default it contains six songs that have not been issued in a live context before but many of the other ten have featured on damn near every other live album. As a souvenir of a specific gig/tour it works very well, but in the grander scheme of things can be passed over for an album that has a greater tracklist variance".

The DVD release was met with critical acclaim, receiving full marks from Kerrang! who deemed it "the next best thing to having front row seats at a Maiden show." Record Collector were just as positive, calling the package "a visua-sonic treat." Although criticising the "blink-and-you'll-miss-it editing," Guitarist also awarded it 5 out of 5, stating, "It may seem strange to you that Maiden are bigger than ever these days, but if you're in any doubt as to why, the evidence is right here." Classic Rock praised the video for being more intimate than 2002's Rock in Rio, commenting that "it provides irrefutable proof that Iron Maiden are still the world's greatest living heavy metal band — bar none." Q were somewhat less positive, giving the DVD a lower score of 4 out of 5, but still called it "a lavish tribute to one of the UK's most enduring bands."

== Track listing ==
Death on the Road – Disc one
No.	Title	Writer(s)	Original release	Length
1.	"Wildest Dreams"	Adrian Smith; Steve Harris	Dance of Death (2003)	4:52
2.	"Wrathchild"	Harris	Killers (1981)	2:49
3.	"Can I Play With Madness"	Smith; Bruce Dickinson; Harris	Seventh Son of a Seventh Son (1988)	3:30
4.	"The Trooper"	Harris	Piece of Mind (1983)	4:12
5.	"Dance of Death"	Janick Gers; Harris	Dance of Death (2003)	9:23
6.	"Rainmaker"	Dave Murray; Harris; Dickinson	Dance of Death (2003)	4:02
7.	"Brave New World"	Murray; Harris; Dickinson	Brave New World (2000)	6:10
8.	"Paschendale"	Smith; Harris	Dance of Death (2003)	10:18
9.	"Lord of the Flies"	Harris; Gers	The X Factor (1995)	5:04
Total length:				50:20

Death on the Road – Disc two
No.	Title	Writer(s)	Original release	Length
1.	"No More Lies"	Harris	Dance of Death (2003)	7:50
2.	"Hallowed Be Thy Name"	Harris	The Number of the Beast (1982)	7:32
3.	"Fear of the Dark"	Harris	Fear of the Dark (1992)	7:28
4.	"Iron Maiden"	Harris	Iron Maiden (1980)	4:50
5.	"Journeyman"	Smith; Harris; Dickinson	Dance of Death (2003)	7:03
6.	"The Number of the Beast"	Harris	The Number of the Beast (1982)	4:58
7.	"Run to the Hills"	Harris	The Number of the Beast (1982)	4:24
Total length:				44:05

=== DVD special features ===
- Death on the Road documentary
- "Life on the Road" documentary
- "The Fans" (interviews)
- Dance of Death EPK
- "Wildest Dreams" and "Rainmaker" promo videos
- Photo and artwork galleries

== Personnel ==
Production and performance credits are adapted from the album liner notes.

Iron Maiden

- Bruce Dickinson – vocals
- Dave Murray – guitars
- Janick Gers – guitars
- Adrian Smith – guitars, backing vocals
- Steve Harris – bass, backing vocals
- Nicko McBrain – drums

Additional musician

- Michael Kenney – keyboards

Production

- Kevin Shirley – producer, engineer, mixing
- Steve Harris – co-producer, video editor, executive producer (documentary)
- Drew Griffiths – assistant engineer
- Howie Weinberg – stereo mastering
- Dave Kutch – 5.1 audio mastering
- Tomas Coox – additional audio mastering
- Johnny Burke – editing technician (concert)
- Matthew Amos – director (documentary)
- Tessa Watts – producer (documentary)
- Joe Abercrombie – editor (documentary)
- MJ Morgan – line producer (documentary)
- Howard Johnson – interviewer (documentary)
- Valerie Potter – interviewer (documentary)
- Melvyn Grant – sleeve illustration
- Peacock – sleeve design, sleeve concept
- Ross Halfin – photography
- Simon Fowler – photography
- Rod Smallwood – executive producer (documentary)

== Charts ==
=== Album ===
Chart (2005)	Peak position
Australian Albums (ARIA)	119
Austrian Albums (Ö3 Austria)	23
Belgian Albums (Ultratop Flanders)	32
Belgian Albums (Ultratop Wallonia)	37
Dutch Albums (Album Top 100)	39
Finnish Albums (Suomen virallinen lista)	5
French Albums (SNEP)	14
German Albums (Offizielle Top 100)	26
Italian Albums (FIMI)	7
Japanese Albums (Oricon)	106
Norwegian Albums (VG-lista)	12
Scottish Albums (Official Charts)	16
Spanish Albums (Promusicae)	18
Swedish Albums (Sverigetopplistan)	7
Swiss Albums (Schweizer Hitparade)	17
UK Albums (Official Charts)	22
UK Rock & Metal Albums (Official Charts)	1

=== Video ===
Chart (2005)	Peak position
Australia (ARIA Charts)	3
Austria (Ö3 Austria Top 10 DVD)	4
Belgium (Flanders) (Ultratop)	4
Finland (The Official Finnish Charts)	1
Hungary (Mahasz)	6
Italy (FIMI)	3
Japan (Oricon)	53
Netherlands (MegaCharts)	11
Norway (VG-lista)	1
Spain (PROMUSICAE)	2
Switzerland (Swiss Hitparade)	78
United Kingdom (UK Video Charts)	1
United States (Billboard charts)	14

== Certifications ==
Album

Region	Certification	Certified units/sales
Spain (Promusicae)	Gold	40,000^{^}
United Kingdom (BPI)	Silver	60,000^{^}
^{^} Shipments figures based on certification alone.

Video

Region	Certification	Certified units/sales
Australia (ARIA)	Gold	7,500^{^}
Finland (Musiikkituottajat)	Gold	8,676
France (SNEP)	Gold	10,000^{*}
^{*} Sales figures based on certification alone.^{^} Shipments figures based on certification alone.
