= The Essential Iron Maiden =

Compilation album by Iron Maiden
- Released: 12 July 2005
- Recorded: 1980–2003
- Genre: Heavy metal
- Length: 2:27:21
- Label: Sanctuary/Columbia
- Producer: Martin Birch; Nigel Green; Steve Harris; Will Malone; Kevin Shirley

Iron Maiden chronology
No More Lies (2004)	The Essential Iron Maiden (2005)	Death on the Road (2005)

Professional ratings
Review scores
Source	Rating
AllMusic	3.5/5 stars
Pitchfork Media	7.5/10.0

The Essential Iron Maiden is the fourth greatest hits compilation by the English heavy metal band Iron Maiden, released on 12 July 2005. Released exclusively in North America, it is part of Sony Music Entertainment's The Essential series. Contrary to other releases from this series, the track listing is presented in reverse-chronological order (i.e., the latest studio-recorded songs appear first).

It is the second album by the band that does not feature Eddie on its cover, the first being the first edition of Live at Donington.

== Track listing ==
Disc One
No.	Title	Writer(s)	Original album	Length
1.	"Paschendale"	Steve Harris, Adrian Smith	2003 ~ Dance of Death	8:26
2.	"Rainmaker"	Bruce Dickinson, Harris, Dave Murray	2003 ~ Dance of Death	3:48
3.	"The Wicker Man"	Dickinson, Harris, Smith	2000 ~ Brave New World	4:35
4.	"Brave New World"	Dickinson, Harris, Murray	2000 ~ Brave New World	6:18
5.	"Futureal"	Blaze Bayley, Harris	1998 ~ Virtual XI	2:56
6.	"The Clansman"	Harris	1998 ~ Virtual XI	8:59
7.	"Sign of the Cross"	Harris	1995 ~ The X Factor	11:16
8.	"Man on the Edge"	Bayley, Janick Gers	1995 ~ The X Factor	4:11
9.	"Be Quick or Be Dead"	Dickinson, Gers	1992 ~ Fear of the Dark	3:23
10.	"Fear of the Dark" (Live in Rock in Rio, Brazil 2001)	Harris	2002 ~ Rock in Rio (1992 ~ Fear of the Dark)	7:52
11.	"Holy Smoke"	Dickinson, Harris	1990 ~ No Prayer for the Dying	3:47
12.	"Bring Your Daughter... to the Slaughter"	Dickinson	1990 ~ No Prayer for the Dying	4:43
13.	"The Clairvoyant"	Harris	1988 ~ Seventh Son of a Seventh Son	4:26

Disc Two
No.	Title	Writer(s)	Original album	Length
1.	"The Evil That Men Do"	Dickinson, Harris, Smith	1988 ~ Seventh Son of a Seventh Son	4:34
2.	"Wasted Years"	Smith	1986 ~ Somewhere in Time	5:06
3.	"Heaven Can Wait"	Harris	1986 ~ Somewhere in Time	7:20
4.	"2 Minutes to Midnight"	Dickinson, Smith	1984 ~ Powerslave	6:00
5.	"Aces High"	Harris	1984 ~ Powerslave	4:29
6.	"Flight of Icarus"	Dickinson, Smith	1983 ~ Piece of Mind	3:51
7.	"The Trooper"	Harris	1983 ~ Piece of Mind	4:12
8.	"The Number of the Beast"	Harris	1982 ~ The Number of the Beast	4:52
9.	"Run to the Hills"	Harris	1982 ~ The Number of the Beast	3:54
10.	"Wrathchild"	Harris	1981 ~ Killers	2:55
11.	"Killers"	Di'Anno, Harris	1981 ~ Killers	5:01
12.	"Phantom of the Opera"	Harris	1980 ~ Iron Maiden	7:06
13.	"Running Free" (Live in Long Beach, US 1985)	Di'Anno, Harris	1985 ~ Live After Death (1980 ~ Iron Maiden)	8:44
14.	"Iron Maiden" (Live in Westfalenhallen, Germany 2003)	Harris	2005 ~ Death on the Road (1980 ~ Iron Maiden)	4:54

== Credits ==
Iron Maiden

- Bruce Dickinson – vocals (disc 1: tracks 1–4, 9–13; disc 2: tracks 1–9, 13–14)
- Dave Murray – guitars (all tracks)
- Adrian Smith – guitars (disc 1: tracks 1–4, 10, 13; disc 2: tracks 1–11, 13–14)
- Steve Harris – bass (all tracks)
- Nicko McBrain – drums (all tracks, except disc 2: tracks 8–12)
- Janick Gers – guitars (disc 1: tracks 1–12; disc 2: track 14)
- Blaze Bayley – vocals (disc 1: tracks 5–8)
- Clive Burr – drums (disc 2: tracks 8–12)
- Paul Di'Anno – vocals (disc 2: tracks 10–12)
- Dennis Stratton – guitar (disc 2: track 12)

Additional musician

- Michael Kenney – keyboards

Production

- Martin Birch – producer
- Steve Harris – producer (disc 1: tracks 1–9; disc 2: track 14)
- Simon Fowler – photography
- Lonn Friend – liner notes
- Nigel Green – producer
- Will Malone – producer
- Dimo Safari – cover photo
- Kevin Shirley – producer, engineer, mastering, mixing
- Howie Weinberg – mastering
