= Anton Gustafsson tolkar Iron Maiden =

Studio album by Anton Maiden
- Released: 1999
- Genre: Heavy metal, Chiptune
- Label: Lunacy, Nihilism

Professional ratings
Review scores
Source	Rating
AllMusic	4/5 stars

Anton Gustafsson tolkar Iron Maiden (Swedish for "Anton Gustafsson Interprets Iron Maiden") is the first and only album by internet celebrity Anton Maiden. It was released in 1999. It consists entirely of MIDI covers of songs by the heavy metal band Iron Maiden, with vocals by Anton.

== Track listing ==
1. "Run to the Hills"
2. "The Trooper"
3. "The Number of the Beast"
4. "2 Minutes to Midnight"
5. "Aces High"
6. "Die With Your Boots On"
7. "Hallowed Be Thy Name"
8. "Rime of the Ancient Mariner"
9. "Flight of Icarus"
10. "Seventh Son of a Seventh Son"
11. "Powerslave"
