= No More Lies =

No More Lies may refer to:

- No More Lies (EP), an EP by Iron Maiden, or the title song
- "No More Lies" (audio drama), a 2007 Doctor Who audio drama
- "No More Lies" (The Moody Blues song), 1988
- "No More Lies" (Michel'le song), 1989
- "No More Lies", a 2000 song by Alice Deejay from Who Needs Guitars Anyway?
- "No More Lies", a 2023 song by Tame Impala and Thundercat
