= Classic Albums: Iron Maiden – The Number of the Beast =

Video by Iron Maiden
- Released: 26 November 2001
- Genre: Heavy metal
- Length: 80:00 (approx.)
- Label: Eagle Vision
- Director: Tim Kirkby
- Producer: Nick de Grunwald

Iron Maiden video chronology
Raising Hell (1994)	Classic Albums: Iron Maiden – The Number of the Beast (2001)	Rock in Rio (2002)

Professional ratings
Review scores
Source	Rating
AllMusic	4/5 stars

Classic Albums: Iron Maiden – The Number of the Beast is a documentary about the making of the album of the same name by the English heavy metal band Iron Maiden, released on 26 November 2001 as part of the Classic Albums documentary series. Directed by Tim Kirkby, it featured cuts from the title track, "Children of the Damned", "Run to the Hills", and "The Prisoner," in addition to extended interviews and live footage of "Hallowed Be Thy Name", recorded during the band's performance at the Rock in Rio festival in 2001.

The video reached No. 9 in the Norwegian DVD Charts, and was certified Gold by the Australian Recording Industry Association.

It was released in DVD, VHS and UMD formats, and featured subtitles in six different languages, Dutch, German, Italian, Portuguese, Spanish, and French.

== Chapter listing ==
1. "The Number of the Beast"
2. "22 Acacia Avenue"
3. "The Prisoner"
4. "Run to the Hills"
5. "Children of the Damned"
6. "Hallowed Be Thy Name"

=== Bonus material ===
1. "Adrian Smith & Dave Murray Twin Guitars"
2. "Beast Stories"
3. "Reading Festival 1982"
4. "Nicknames"
5. "Rod Smallwood"
6. "Adrian Smith Plays 'Children of the Damned'"
7. "Adrian Smith Plays 'The Number of the Beast'"
8. "A Message from Clive Burr"^{*}
9. "'Hallowed Be Thy Name' Rio 2001"

* Former Iron Maiden drummer Clive Burr used the release to publicly announce that he had been diagnosed with multiple sclerosis. After finding out about Burr's condition through the DVD itself, the band helped set up the Clive Burr MS Trust Fund, for which they raised money through several charity concerts and a live release of the "Run to the Hills" single. Burr died on 12 March 2013.

== Credits ==
Production credits are adapted from the DVD cover notes.

- Tim Kirkby – director
- Nick de Grunwald – series producer
- Terry Shand – executive producer
- Geoff Kempin – executive producer
- Jamie Rugge-Price – co-executive producer
- Bous de Jong – co-executive producer
- Melissa Morton-Hicks – line producer
- Martin R. Smith – series production executive

== Charts ==
Country	Chart (2008)	Peak position
Norway	VG-lista	9

== Certifications ==
Region	Certification	Certified units/sales
Australia (ARIA)	Gold	7,500^{^}
^{^} Shipments figures based on certification alone.

== See also ==
- The Number of the Beast
