= Dance of Death (album) =

Studio album by Iron Maiden
- Released: 2 September 2003
- Recorded: January–February 2003
- Studio: Sarm West (London)
- Genre: Heavy metal
- Length: 67:57
- Label: EMI
- Producer: Kevin Shirley

Iron Maiden chronology
Edward the Great (2002)	Dance of Death (2003)	No More Lies (2004)

Singles from Dance of Death
- 1. "Wildest Dreams" Released: 1 September 2003; 2. "Rainmaker" Released: 24 November 2003

Dance of Death is the thirteenth studio album by English heavy metal band Iron Maiden, released first in Japan on 2 September and then 8 September 2003 in the rest of the world excluding North America (where it was released a day later). The album was an analogue recording.

Their second studio release since the return of vocalist Bruce Dickinson and guitarist Adrian Smith in 1999, the album features the band's first-ever fully acoustic track, "Journeyman", as well as "New Frontier", their only song co-written by drummer Nicko McBrain. (Note: While 1984's Powerslave does not have a songwriting contribution from McBrain, he is credited on one of its B-sides singles, which later featured on bonus tracks, although this is a recording of an argument between McBrain and Harris, rather than an actual song.) As with Brave New World, its predecessor in 2000, the record was produced by Kevin Shirley, who has worked with Iron Maiden on all subsequent releases.

== Background ==
The band first confirmed on 27 November 2002 that they would be working on a follow-up to 2000's Brave New World with producer Kevin Shirley; the album was announced alongside a small set of European tour dates for the following year. On 6 January 2003, Shirley confirmed via his website that the band would begin recording that month, followed by the announcement that the basic tracks had been completed on 5 February and that the release was to be mixed in April. On 31 May, the band announced that the album, recorded at Sarm West Studios, would be entitled Dance of Death, after which the release date was revealed on 17 June.

The band undertook the Dance of Death World Tour in support of the album, which included many theatrical elements inspired by the record's songs. During "Dance of Death", Bruce Dickinson would wear theatrical masks and a cape while moving around the stage; at the end he would dress as the Grim Reaper for the final chorus. During "Paschendale", Dickinson would wear a traditional British Infantryman trench coat and helmet (although he revealed in the Death on the Road documentary that it was actually Hungarian), as worn during World War I, and the set would be decorated with barbed wire. The tour led to a live album and DVD, entitled Death on the Road, released in 2005 and 2006.

The album was released as a DVD-Audio disc in 2004, including 5.1 mixes of each song.

== Songs ==
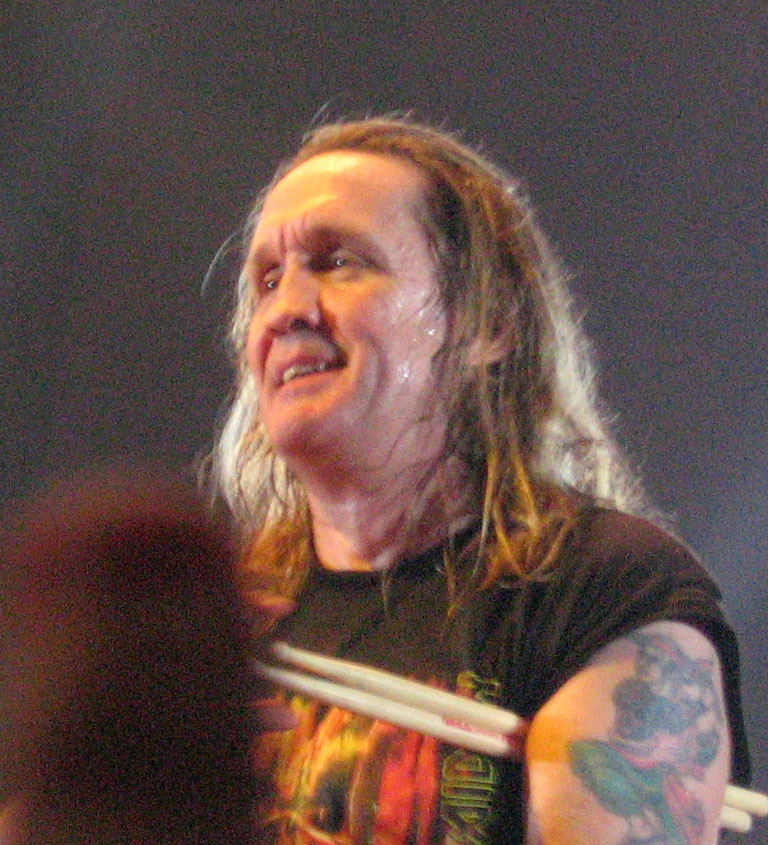
Drummer Nicko McBrain made his songwriting debut on Dance of Death.

Dance of Death is the only Iron Maiden album to date in which drummer Nicko McBrain has a songwriting credit, having co-written "New Frontier". This also makes it the only Iron Maiden album to date in which every member of the band receives a songwriting credit. The song expresses McBrain's views on human cloning. McBrain, a born-again Christian, explained that "I personally believe that God created man and it's only God's right to create a human being because only He can give you a soul. When man attempts to make man then it's a monster in a test tube."

"Montségur" was based on the fall of the Cathar stronghold of the same name, which fell in the aftermath of the Albigensian Crusade in 1244. Dickinson, who wrote the song's lyrics, states, "There is so much great stuff and so many great stories throughout history that you can make parallels with the modern day – particularly when history repeats itself as often as it does – that it makes for some very colourful subject matter."

"Paschendale" is about the Battle of Passchendaele which took place during the First World War. It was written by Adrian Smith, who usually contributes to the band's shorter, more commercial-sounding songs, but decided to write what he describes as "a traditional Maiden epic". It features strong progressive rock elements, including its length and detailed structure. Dickinson comments, "the beauty of 'Paschendale' isn't in the epic-ness of the song – although you have to admit it is a powerful and stirring body of music – but the detail." In live performances, Dickinson introduces the song with a passage from Wilfred Owen's "Anthem for Doomed Youth".

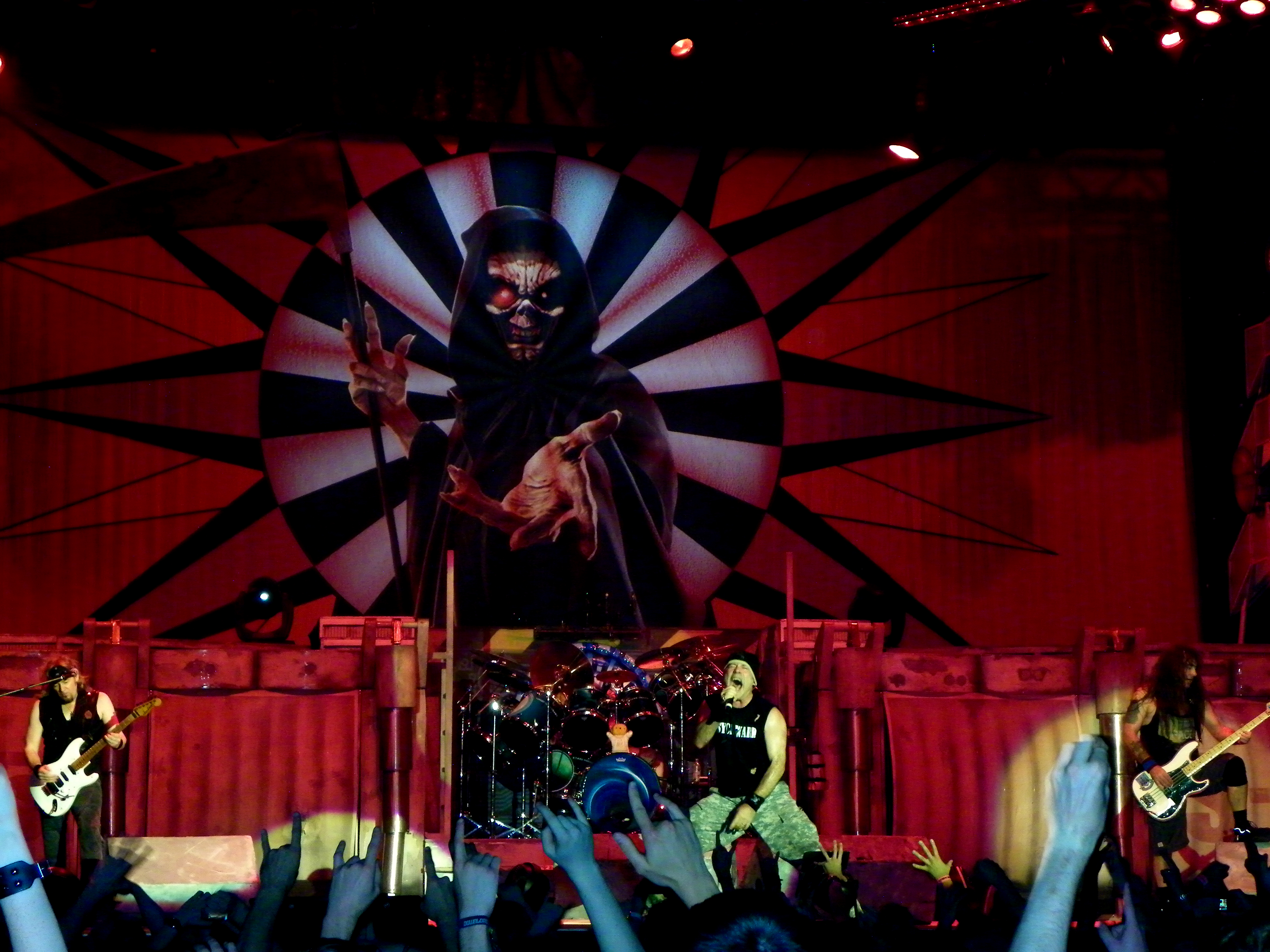
Iron Maiden performing "Dance of Death" in 2011

According to guitarist Janick Gers, the album's title track was inspired by the final scene of Ingmar Bergman's The Seventh Seal, at the end of which "these figures on the horizon start doing a little jig, which is the dance of death". Gers wrote most of the music and explained the concept to Steve Harris, who wrote the lyrics and most of the melodies.

"Face in the Sand" is based on the media coverage surrounding the Iraq War, taking place as the album was being recorded. Dickinson explains, "I remember thinking about the desert sands as an image and how it moves and shifts with time. Specifically what I was thinking was that whatever empires you tend to build – whether they are British, American, Iraqi or whatever, they'll all crumble and fade away into something else. So, to my mind at least, the best thing you can hope for, if you were to leave anything behind, is just an imprint in the sand." The song is notable for being the first and only Iron Maiden track in which McBrain uses a double bass pedal.

The final track, "Journeyman", is Iron Maiden's first and to date only fully acoustic song. According to Dickinson on the Death on the Road live album, it is about "the whole process of writing and being a musician", although Mick Wall describes it as "a wistful tale of carpe diem". The song was originally recorded with electric instruments, however, as Dickinson states, "after all the battering that we've given the listener over the last hour of music it just seemed right to play out with something totally unexpected and left field." The original version appears on the No More Lies EP.

== Artwork ==
The original unused cover art

The computer-generated cover art was provided by David Patchett, who asked for his name to be removed from the album's credits after the band decided to use an unfinished version. The album cover was received negatively by both fans and critics, being cited on numerous "worst of" lists. Dickinson later stated he found the cover embarrassing. Simon Young of Kerrang! said of the cover artwork: "Remember when Ally McBeal used to have hallucinations of a poorly animated dancing baby? Here it is at some sort of mask party hosted by Eddie." Joe DaVita of Loudwire said the artwork "looks like an unfinished high school graphic design project."

The original cover art supposedly featured only Eddie and a few monks behind him but the band manager Rod Smallwood felt it looked empty, so he hired someone from IronMaiden.com to design characters surrounding Eddie using the program Poser. They then gave the roughs back to Patchett and asked him to work on the skin and mask textures. Patchett did so but was unimpressed with the result.

== Reception and legacy ==
Professional ratings
Review scores
Source	Rating
AllMusic	4/5 stars
BW&BK	7.5/10
Kerrang!	5/5 stars
Sputnikmusic	4/5 stars

Reviews for the album were generally positive with Kerrang! describing it as "stupendous stuff and concrete proof that Maiden are as electrifying and important as they have been in a long time". Sputnikmusic were also positive about the album, giving special mention to "Paschendale", described as "quite easily the ultimate Maiden masterpiece". Although deeming the first three songs "refreshing yet unremarkable", AllMusic describes Dance of Death as "a triumphant return to form for these heavy metal legends."

Although criticising the album for its length and for not "matching the quality" of its predecessor, Brave New World, PopMatters praised the band for being able to "still easily outclass most of the younger nu-metal bands today".

In 2024, Joe DaVita of Loudwire included the album in his list of "60 Hilariously Awful Metal Album Covers".

== Track listing ==
Dance of Death track listing
No.	Title	Writer(s)	Length
1.	"Wildest Dreams"	Adrian Smith; Steve Harris	3:52
2.	"Rainmaker"	Dave Murray; Harris; Bruce Dickinson	3:48
3.	"No More Lies"	Harris	7:21
4.	"Montségur"	Janick Gers; Harris; Dickinson	5:50
5.	"Dance of Death"	Gers; Harris	8:36
6.	"Gates of Tomorrow"	Gers; Harris; Dickinson	5:12
7.	"New Frontier"	Nicko McBrain; Smith; Dickinson	5:04
8.	"Paschendale"	Smith; Harris	8:27
9.	"Face in the Sand"	Smith; Harris; Dickinson	6:31
10.	"Age of Innocence"	Murray; Harris	6:10
11.	"Journeyman"	Smith; Harris; Dickinson	7:06
Total length:			67:57

== Personnel ==
Production and performance credits are adapted from the album liner notes.

=== Iron Maiden ===
- Bruce Dickinson – vocals
- Dave Murray – guitars
- Adrian Smith – guitars
- Janick Gers – guitars
- Steve Harris – bass guitar, keyboards, co-producer
- Nicko McBrain – drums

=== Production ===
- Kevin Shirley – producer, engineer, mixing
- Drew Griffiths – engineer
- Brad Spence – assistant engineer
- Tim Young – mastering
- Dave Patchett – sleeve illustration (uncredited)
- Simon Fowler – photography

== Charts ==
=== Weekly charts ===
Chart (2003)	Peak position
Australian Albums (ARIA)	12
Austrian Albums (Ö3 Austria)	3
Belgian Albums (Ultratop Flanders)	4
Belgian Albums (Ultratop Wallonia)	9
Canadian Albums (Billboard)	5
Danish Albums (Hitlisten)	10
Dutch Albums (Album Top 100)	10
Finnish Albums (Suomen virallinen lista)	1
French Albums (SNEP)	3
German Albums (Offizielle Top 100)	2
Greek Albums (IFPI)	2
Hungarian Albums (MAHASZ)	3
Irish Albums (IRMA)	6
Italian Albums (FIMI)	1
Japanese Albums (Oricon)	11
New Zealand Albums (RMNZ)	21
Norwegian Albums (VG-lista)	3
Polish Albums (ZPAV)	3
Portuguese Albums (AFP)	4
Russian Albums (NFPF)	9
Scottish Albums (Official Charts)	2
Spanish Albums (AFYVE)	3
Swedish Albums (Sverigetopplistan)	1
Swiss Albums (Schweizer Hitparade)	2
UK Albums (Official Charts)	2
UK Rock & Metal Albums (Official Charts)	2
US Billboard 200	18

=== Year-end charts ===
Chart (2003)	Position
German Albums (Offizielle Top 100)	81
Swedish Albums (Sverigetopplistan)	33
Swiss Albums (Schweizer Hitparade)	72

== Certifications ==
Region	Certification	Certified units/sales
Argentina (CAPIF)	Gold	20,000^{^}
Brazil (Pro-Música Brasil)	Gold	50,000^{*}
Finland (Musiikkituottajat)	Gold	24,528
Germany (BVMI)	Gold	100,000^{^}
Greece (IFPI Greece)	Gold	10,000^{^}
Norway (IFPI Norway)	Gold	20,000^{*}
Sweden (GLF)	Gold	30,000^{^}
United Kingdom (BPI)	Gold	100,000^{^}
^{*} Sales figures based on certification alone.^{^} Shipments figures based on certification alone.
