= No More Lies (EP) =

EP by Iron Maiden
- Released: 29 March 2004
- Recorded: 2003
- Studios: Sarm West, London
- Genre: Heavy metal
- Length: 35:38
- Label: EMI
- Producer: Kevin Shirley

Iron Maiden chronology
Dance of Death (2003)	No More Lies (2004)	The Essential Iron Maiden (2005)

No More Lies – Dance of Death Souvenir EP is a studio EP by British heavy metal band Iron Maiden, released on 29 March 2004.

This EP was released as a "thank you" to fans, packaged in a box containing a free sweatband. Besides the studio version of "No More Lies" taken from the 2003 album Dance of Death, it also contains two alternate versions of songs from the same album: an orchestral version of "Paschendale" and the original electric version of "Journeyman" (not the acoustic album version). The EP also contains a hidden bonus track, an alternative version of "Age of Innocence" (retitled as "Age of Innocence... How Old?") with drummer Nicko McBrain on vocals.

== Track listing ==
No More Lies track listing
No.	Title	Writer(s)	Length
1.	"No More Lies"	Steve Harris	7:21
2.	"Paschendale" (orchestral version)	Adrian Smith; Harris	8:27
3.	"Journeyman" (electric version)	Smith; Harris; Bruce Dickinson	19:50
Total length:			35:38

=== Notes ===
- "Journeyman" ends after 7:06. There's silence for six minutes and six seconds before the hidden track "Age of Innocence... How Old?" starts at 13:12. It was written by Dave Murray and Steve Harris, with drummer Nicko McBrain on vocals.
- Includes enhanced video track for "No More Lies", recorded during the Dance of Death World Tour in 2004.

== Chart positions ==
Country	Chart (2004)	Position
Canada	Canadian Singles Chart	8
Finland	The Official Finnish Charts	3
France	SNEP	70
Germany	Media Control Charts	36
Ireland	Irish Singles Chart	25
Italy	FIMI	10
Switzerland	Swiss Hitparade	93

== Personnel ==
Production and performance credits are adapted from the EP liner notes.

Iron Maiden

- Bruce Dickinson - lead vocals
- Dave Murray - guitar
- Adrian Smith - guitar
- Janick Gers - guitar
- Steve Harris - bass, co-producer
- Nicko McBrain - drums, lead vocals on "Age of Innocence (How Old?)"

Production

- Kevin Shirley – producer, mixing
- Matthew Amos – video editor ("No More Lies")
- Ross Halfin – photography
- Simon Fowler – photography
- Lawrence Watson – photography
- Mick Hutson – photography
