= Westfalenhallen =

Three multi-purpose venues, located in Dortmund, Germany

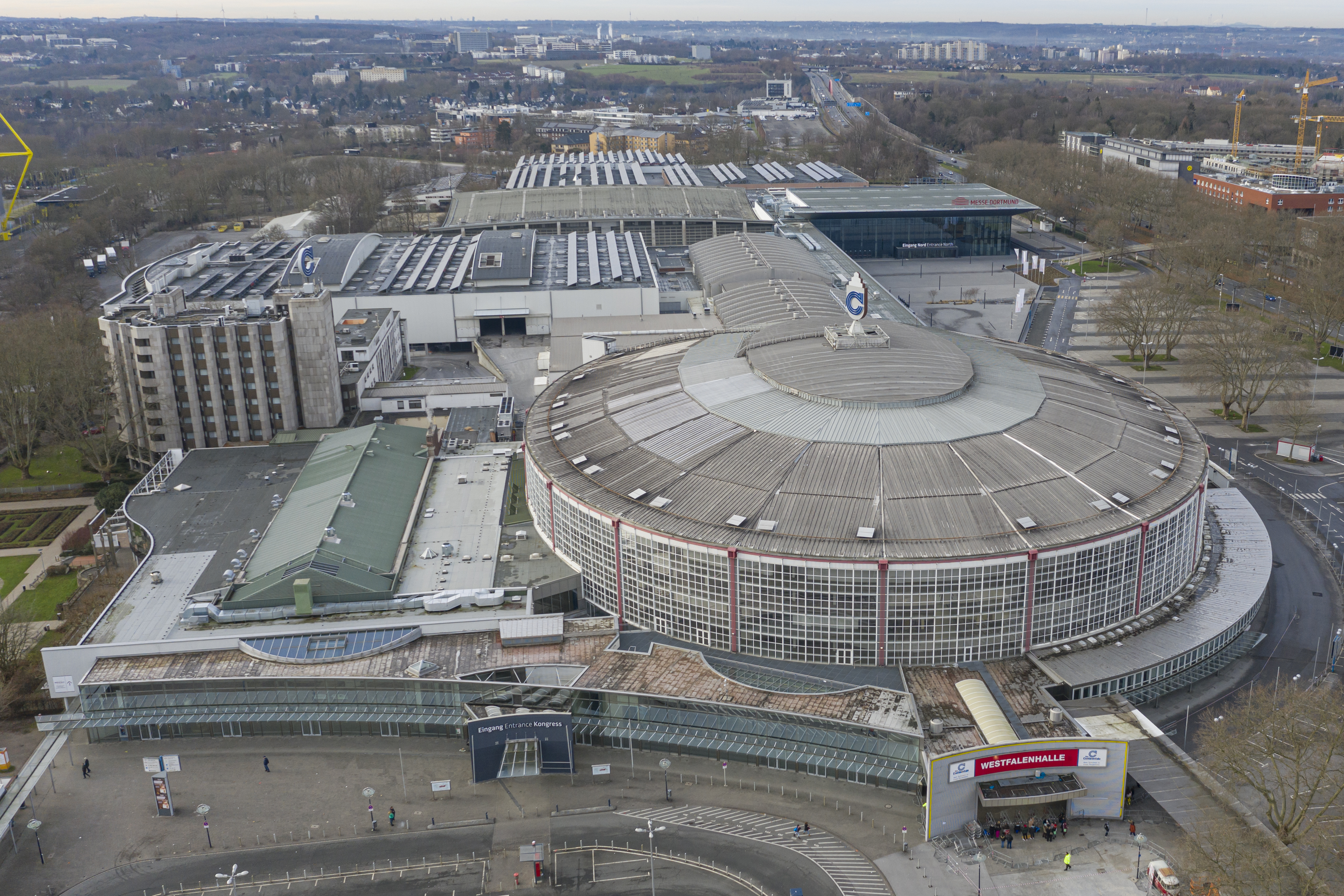
- Exterior of venue (c.2019)
- Address: Strobelallee 45; 44139 Dortmund, Germany
- Coordinates: 51°29′47″N 7°27′21″E
- Owner: Stadt Dortmund
- Operator: Westfalenhallen Unternehmensgruppe GmbH

Construction
- Opened: November 1925; 2 February 1952
- Renovated: 2000–2002; 2011; 2015
- Expanded: 1955; 1959; 1973; 1980; 1985; 1989; 1996
- Closed: May 1944–January 1952

Website
- Venue Website

Westfalenhallen is a conference venue (Kongresszentrum Dortmund) and exhibition center (Messe Dortmund) with an indoor arena (Westfalenhalle) in Dortmund, Germany. It is surrounded by the Eissportzentrum Westfalenhallen, Stadion Rote Erde, Westfalenstadion and Helmut-Körnig-Halle.

The original building was opened in 1925, but was destroyed during World War II. Reopening in 1952, new halls were built, the "Große Westfalenhalle", and the "Kleine Westfalenhalle", which served for balls, exhibitions and concerts, such as the Dortmunder Philharmoniker, until the Opernhaus Dortmund opened in 1966. The Bundesliga was founded at the Westfalenhallen in 1962.

== Events ==
The venue played host to the 1964, 1980 and 2004 World Figure Skating Championships, as well as the 1955, 1983 and 1993 IIHF Ice Hockey World Championships tournaments.

Bob Marley and The Wailers performed on 13 June 1980 as part of their Uprising Tour, in support of their new release (1980’s ‘Uprising’ album).

Pink Floyd performed two concerts on 23 and 24 January 1977 as part of their ”In the Flesh” Tour (1977 Pink Floyd 'Animals' tour) at the venue.

ABBA performed on 25 October 1979 as part of “ABBA: The Tour”.

In 1981, the venue was one of only four locations worldwide of The Wall Tour, by Pink Floyd, along with Los Angeles, Uniondale, New York (New York City) and London. They returned to perform three concerts on 27, 28 and 29 June 1988 as part of their “A Momentary Lapse of Reason Tour”.

In 1983, the venue hosted the Rock Pop Festival, featuring Iron Maiden (headliner band), Scorpions, Ozzy Osbourne, Def Leppard, Quiet Riot, Judas Priest, Krokus and The Michael Schenker Group - one of the largest heavy metal lineups of all time, featuring these bands at the peak of their careers.

In November 1984, U2 played the venue, as part of “The Unforgettable Fire Tour”. The performance was recorded and can be found on YouTube.

Portions of Yes's 9012Live: The Solos live album, which was released in 1985, were recorded at the venue.

In 1988, Prince broadcast a performance from the arena, live via satellite, across Europe, later releasing it on video.

On 17 July 1990, Madonna, one of the most globally successful female artists, performed a show during her Blond Ambition Tour.

The Spice Girls performed at the venue on 1 April 1998, on the European Leg of the “Spiceworld Tour”.

Iron Maiden recorded Death on the Road, a live CD/DVD, at the venue on 24 November 2003.

Linkin Park performed at the venue on October 26, 2010, as part of the European leg of the world tour for their fourth studio album, A Thousand Suns.

== Floor areas of Messe Westfalenhalle ==
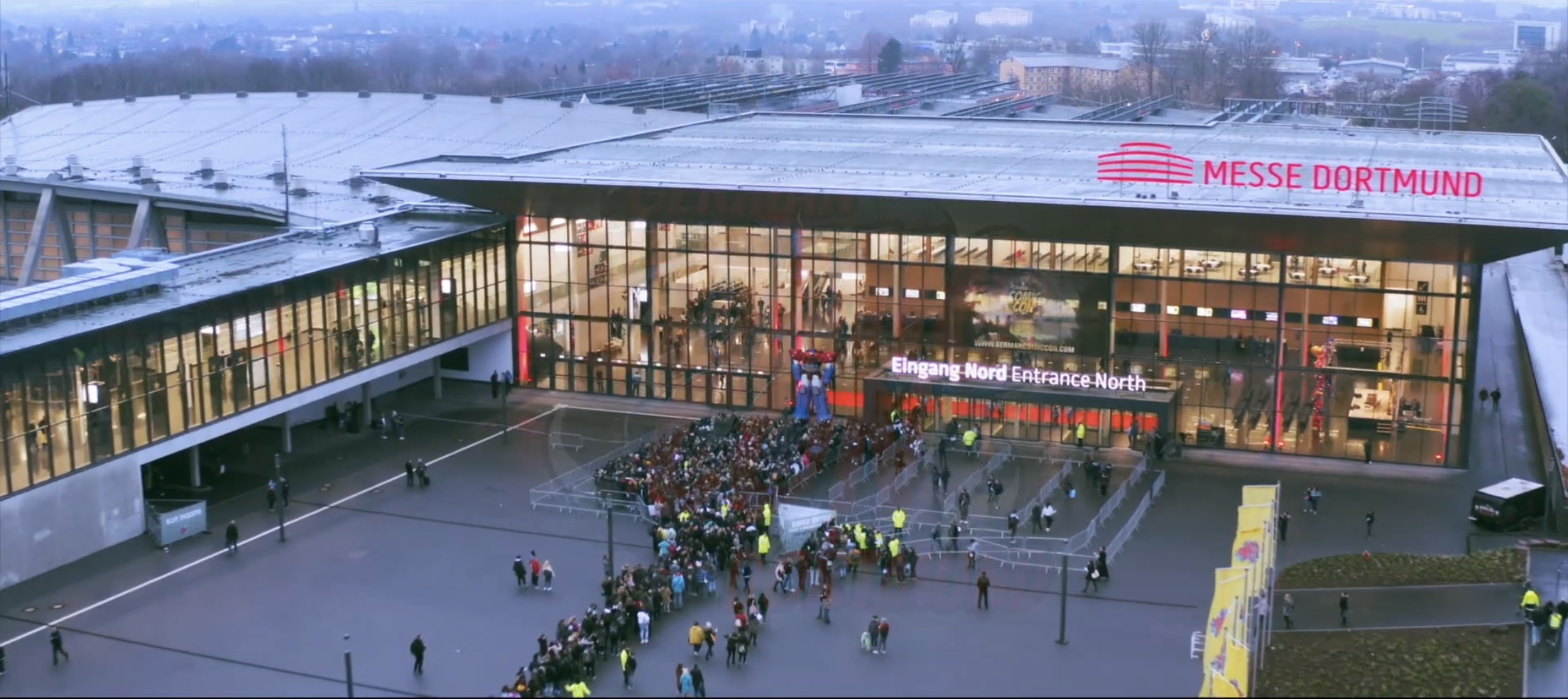
Messe Westfalenhallen

Hall	Floor area
Halle 1	1,800 m^{2}
Halle 1B	970 m^{2}
Halle 1U	960 m^{2}
Halle 2	1,730 m^{2}
Halle 3	9,800 m^{2}
Halle 4	8,300 m^{2}
Halle 5	5,100 m^{2}
Halle 6	7,200 m^{2}
Halle 7	6,000 m^{2}
Halle 8	5,000 m^{2}

== Public transport ==
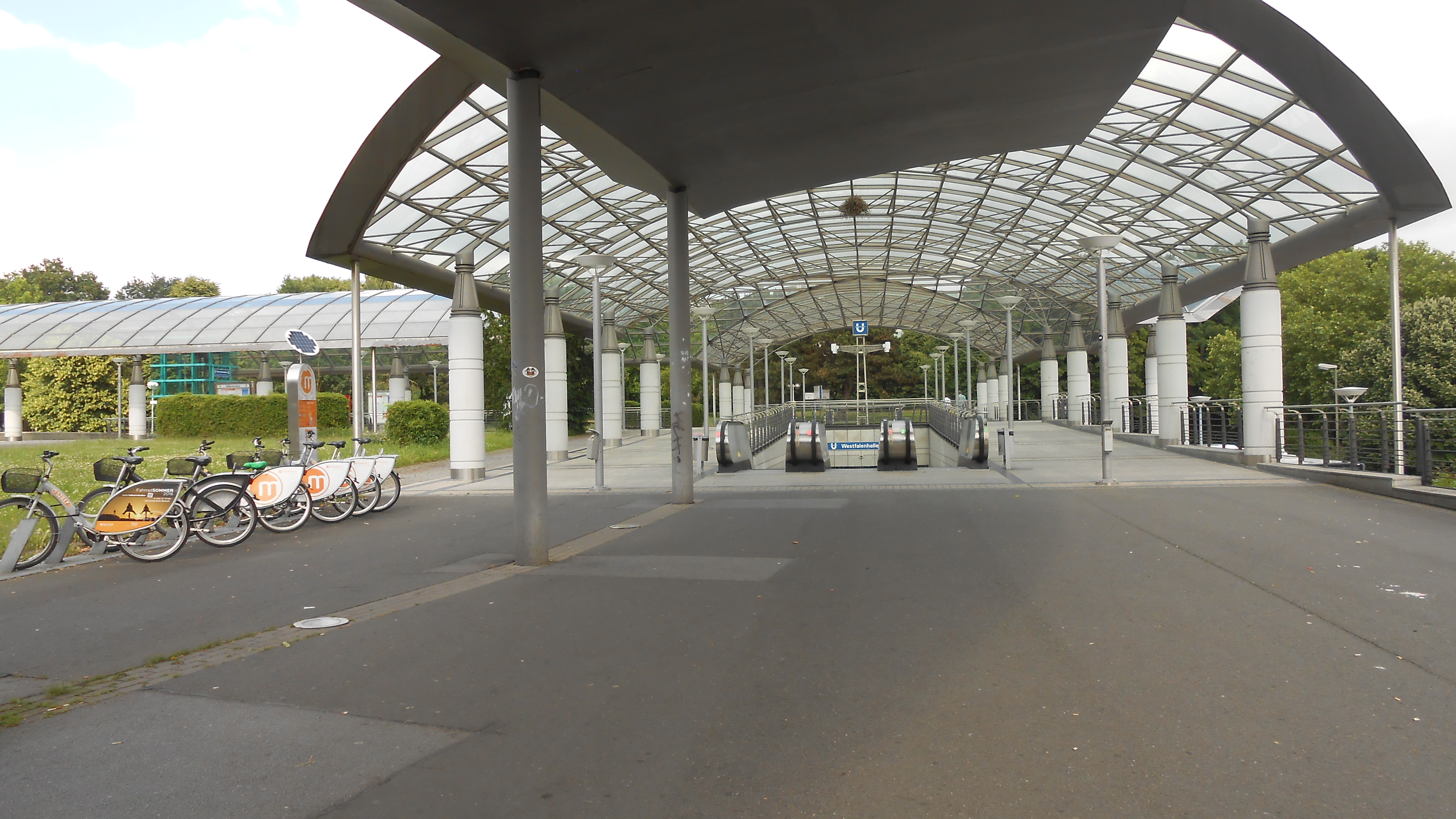
Westfalenhallen station in 2016

Westfalenhallen is officially a terminus station of the Dortmund Stadtbahn (urban rail) line U45 and U46, part of the Verkehrsverbund Rhein-Ruhr (VRR). Practically, it is not a terminus station: The trains of the line U46 continue as U45 to the central station, while the U45 trains usually continue as U46 to Brunnenstraße. In case of football matches of Borussia Dortmund or other events at Westfalenstadion, the trains serve the terminus station Stadion.

Preceded by none	European Indoor Games; Venue; 1966	Succeeded by Sportovni hala Prague
