= Wildest Dreams (Iron Maiden song) =

2003 single by Iron Maiden

Single by Iron Maiden

from the album Dance of Death
- B-side: "Pass the Jam"; "Blood Brothers" (orchestral mix)
- Released: 1 September 2003
- Recorded: 2003
- Studio: Sarm West (London)
- Genre: Heavy metal
- Length: 3:49
- Label: EMI
- Songwriters: Adrian Smith; Steve Harris
- Producer: Kevin Shirley

Iron Maiden singles chronology
"Run to the Hills (Live in 2001)" (2002)	"Wildest Dreams" (2003)	"Rainmaker" (2003)

DVD cover

"Wildest Dreams" is a song by English heavy metal band Iron Maiden. It was released on 1 September 2003 as the lead single from their 13th studio album, Dance of Death (2003). It was written by guitarist Adrian Smith and bassist Steve Harris, and produced by Kevin Shirley.

== Production ==
The band began performing the song in concert before the album was released. The single also includes an improvisational jam from the Dance of Death sessions. The song was again played on The Final Frontier World Tour.

The music video is an animated short, where the band members drive around a desolate planet and into the mouth of Eddie (as depicted on the CD single cover).

The guitar solo in "Wildest Dreams" is played by Adrian Smith.

It is also unique in the release of a DVD single at the same time as the CD single, the first time this was done by the band.

The single was released as a 7" Green Vinyl Limited Edition with two tracks; A CD maxi-single with three tracks on it; Then for the first time a DVD version of the title track as a single which also had a behind the scenes.

== Track listing ==
=== CD single ===
1. "Wildest Dreams" (Adrian Smith, Steve Harris) – 3:49
2. "Pass the Jam" (Bruce Dickinson, Janick Gers, Harris, Nicko McBrain, Dave Murray, Smith) – 8:20
3. "Blood Brothers" (Orchestral Mix) (Harris) - 7:10

=== 7" Green Vinyl ===
1. A1 - "Wildest Dreams" (Smith, Harris) – 3:49
2. B2 - "Pass the Jam" (Dickinson, Gers, Harris, McBrain, Murray, Smith) – 8:20

=== DVD single ===
1. "Wildest Dreams" (promo video) (Smith, Harris) – 3:49
2. "The Nomad" (rock mix) (Murray, Harris) - 9:01
3. "Blood Brothers" (rock mix) (Harris) - 7:10
4. "Dance of Death – Behind the Scenes" (video) - 2:00

=== Japanese CD single ===
1. "Wildest Dreams" (promo video) (Smith, Harris) – 3:49
2. "Pass the Jam" (Dickinson, Gers, Harris, McBrain, Murray, Smith) - 8:20
3. "Blood Brothers" (rock mix) (Harris) - 7:10
4. "Blood Brothers" (orchestral Mix) (Harris) - 7:10

== Personnel ==
Production credits are adapted from the CD, DVD, and picture disc covers.

Iron Maiden

- Bruce Dickinson – vocals
- Dave Murray – guitar
- Adrian Smith – guitar
- Janick Gers – guitar
- Steve Harris – bass, co-producer
- Nicko McBrain – drums

Production

- Kevin Shirley – producer, mixing
- Howard Greenhalgh – music video director

== Charts ==
Weekly chart performance for "Wildest Dreams"
Chart (2003)	Peak position
Austria (Ö3 Austria Top 40)	65
Canada (Nielsen SoundScan)	26
Denmark (Tracklisten)	9
Finland (Suomen virallinen lista)	1
France (SNEP)	57
Germany (GfK)	27
Hungary (Single Top 40)	1
Ireland (IRMA)	19
Italy (FIMI)	4
Netherlands (Single Top 100)	45
Norway (VG-lista)	5
Spain (Promusicae)	2
Sweden (Sverigetopplistan)	4
Switzerland (Schweizer Hitparade)	68
UK Singles (Official Charts)	6
UK Rock & Metal (Official Charts)	1
