= The Trooper =

1983 single by Iron Maiden

Single by Iron Maiden

from the album Piece of Mind and Death on the Road
- B-side: 1983; "Cross-Eyed Mary" (Jethro Tull cover); 2005 CD; "The Trooper" (live); "Prowler" (live); 2005 7" live; "Another Life" (live); 2005 12"; "The Trooper" (live); "Murders in the Rue Morgue" (live); 2005 digital download; "The Trooper" (live)
- Released: 20 June 1983; 15 August 2005
- Recorded: 1983; 24 November 2003
- Genre: Heavy metal
- Length: 4:11
- Label: EMI
- Songwriter: Steve Harris
- Producer: Martin Birch

Iron Maiden singles chronology
"Flight of Icarus" (1983)	"The Trooper" (1983)	"2 Minutes to Midnight" (1984)
"The Number of the Beast (reissue)" (2005)	"The Trooper (live in 2003)" (2005)	"The Reincarnation of Benjamin Breeg" (2006)

Music video
- "The Trooper" on YouTube

"The Trooper" is a song by the English heavy metal band Iron Maiden, released as the second single on 20 June 1983 from the band's fourth studio album, Piece of Mind (1983). It was one of only a few Iron Maiden songs to achieve frequent radio airplay in the United States, peaking at No. 28 on the US Billboard Mainstream Rock.

The song achieved success in the United Kingdom, reaching No. 12 in the UK Singles Chart—a better reception than the band's previous single, "Flight of Icarus". It is one of their most popular and remains an essential track of heavy metal music. A live version of the song, from album Death on the Road, was issued in 2005.

== Overview ==
Written by bassist and founding member Steve Harris, the song is based on the Charge of the Light Brigade at the Battle of Balaclava 1854, which took place during the Crimean War, and inspired by Lord Tennyson's 1854 poem of the same name. The track has been the subject of significant praise since its release, with AllMusic describing it as "an all-time genre classic that boasts guitarists Dave Murray and Adrian Smith's most memorable harmonized lead riff, plus that trademark galloping rhythm", while Mick Wall comments that it is the song "which most Maiden fans from those days still recall first when you mention the Piece of Mind album". Despite the popularity of the song, it was the single's B-side, a cover of Jethro Tull's "Cross-Eyed Mary", which managed to gain a substantial amount of airplay on US radio, becoming one of the band's few tracks, along with the first "Piece of Mind" single "Flight of Icarus", to do so.

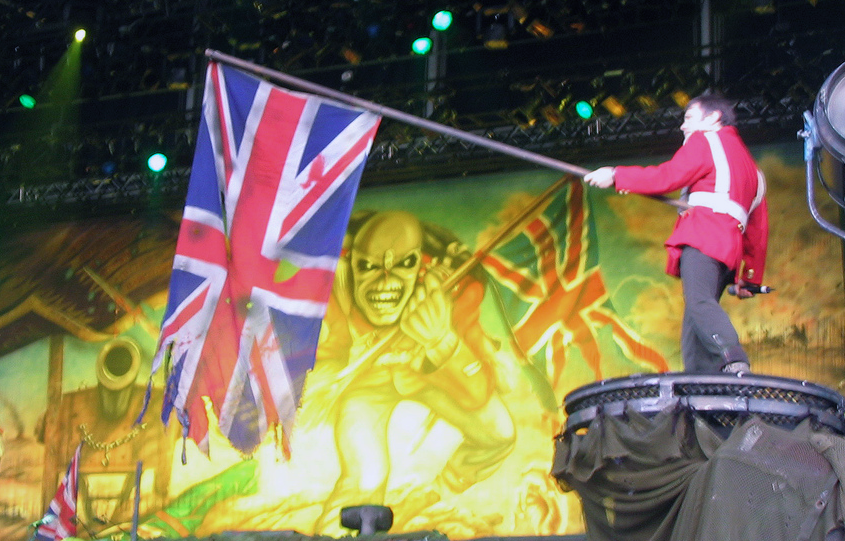
Bruce Dickinson performing the song live wearing an antique British Army red coat.

The single's accompanying music video, filmed in Brixton Academy and directed by Jim Yukich, included clips of a cavalry battle from the 1936 film The Charge of the Light Brigade, starring Errol Flynn and Olivia de Havilland, which the BBC refused to play unedited, deeming the footage too violent. The band's manager, Rod Smallwood, has since criticized the decision, stating, "Anyone would think we'd killed the horses ourselves instead of using an old Errol Flynn movie". In 2003, Iron Maiden released a Camp Chaos version for the song. The music video shows the never-before-seen clips of the band playing the song (although it was rarely featured in the Australian TV show Rage). as well as the animated battle between Eddie and politicians Al Gore and George W. Bush to which Eddie ended the conflict in the video by killing both Bush, Gore and their team. The updated version came in 2008, this time, the two US politicians were replaced by Eddie's yellow skeleton allies and their red enemy skeletons.

A regular fixture in the band's concerts, vocalist Bruce Dickinson has always waved a Union Flag during live performances and, more recently, has begun wearing an authentic red coat uniform which would have been worn during the battle on which the song was based. During a performance in Dublin in 2003, Dickinson's flag-waving reportedly received a large amount of booing from the Irish audience.

While the band were receiving criticism from Sharon Osbourne in 2005, at the time justifying her attack on the band at the 2005 Ozzfest, she accused Iron Maiden of disrespecting American troops, then fighting alongside the British in Iraq, for waving a Union Flag in the US, although Classic Rock magazine supported the band by pointing out that the song's subject bore no relation to the military activity then taking place in the Middle East.

On 15 August 2005, a live version of the song was released from the then upcoming live album, Death on the Road.

On 24 April 2016, during Iron Maiden's performance in Beijing (their first in China), Dickinson did not bring out a flag while performing "The Trooper" as part of the request from the Chinese government to allow Iron Maiden to perform in the country. The flag was also omitted for a concert in Shanghai two days later.

== In popular culture ==
The song has appeared in several Iron Maiden tribute albums, including A Call to Irons: A Tribute to Iron Maiden, Numbers from the Beast, A Tribute to the Beast and Maiden Heaven: A Tribute to Iron Maiden, as well as on records by tribute bands such as Maiden uniteD (on 2010's Mind the Acoustic Pieces) and The Iron Maidens (on their 2006 self-titled debut album). In addition, the song has been released by Sentenced on The Trooper EP (1994), Rage on End of All Days (1996), Hellsongs on Hymns in the Key of 666 (2008), Thumper on the Metalliska compilation, Highland Glory as a bonus track on Forever Endeavour (2005), Radio Cult on Grooves from the Grave (2008), Stryper on The Covering, Iced Earth on the "tour edition" of their 2011 album, Dystopia, 2Cellos on their 2015 album, Celloverse, and Esprit D'Air releasing a cover with Tim "Ripper" Owens and Ben Christo (The Sisters of Mercy). In 2024, Mongolian folk metal band The Hu released a Mongolian language version of "The Trooper" on their EP of the same name. It was also covered by the American punk rock band Supernova on the 1999 punk and ska band compilation "I Love Metal."

On top of this, the track has also been included in the Guitar Hero II, Carmageddon II: Carpocalypse Now, Guitar Hero Smash Hits and Rock Band video games, is mentioned in the novel World War Z by Max Brooks and is used as the opening theme for the documentary series Metal Evolution. The song is featured during the series finale of the Netflix series Stranger Things, playing after the valediction speech delivered by the character Dustin Henderson.

Iron Maiden created a beer called "Trooper", named after the song.

=== Northern Ireland ===
During the course of the Troubles in Northern Ireland the image of Eddie, as he appears on the sleeve of "The Trooper", became an unofficial mascot of the Ulster Freedom Fighters loyalist paramilitary group and was the main figure on a number of the group's murals. The loyalist representation frequently carried a tattered flag with the emblem of the Ulster Defence Association rather than the Union Flag as on the Iron Maiden sleeve.

== Track listings ==
7" and 12" single

Side one
No.	Title	Writer(s)	Length
1.	"The Trooper"	Steve Harris	4:10

Side two
No.	Title	Writer(s)	Length
2.	"Cross-Eyed Mary" (Jethro Tull cover)	Ian Anderson	3:52

2005 enhanced CD

Compact disc
No.	Title	Writer(s)	Length
1.	"The Trooper" (live at the Westfalenhalle Arena, Dortmund, Germany, 24 November 2003)	Harris	4:13
2.	"The Trooper"	Harris	4:12
3.	"Prowler" (live at Egilshöllin, Reykjavík, Iceland, 7 June 2005)	Harris	4:24
4.	"The Trooper" (video – live at the Westfallenhalle Arena, Dortmund, Germany, 24 November 2003)	Harris	4:12
5.	"The Trooper" (video – music video)	Harris	4:10

2005 7" blue vinyl

Side one
No.	Title	Writer(s)	Length
1.	"The Trooper" (live at the Westfallenhalle Arena, Dortmund, Germany, 24 November 2003)	Harris	4:13

Side two
No.	Title	Writer(s)	Length
2.	"Another Life" (live at Egilshollin, Reykjavík, Iceland, 7 June 2005)	Harris	3:43

2005 12" picture disc

Side one
No.	Title	Writer(s)	Length
1.	"The Trooper" (live at the Westfallenhalle Arena, Dortmund, Germany, 24 November 2003)	Harris	4:13

Side two
No.	Title	Writer(s)	Length
1.	"The Trooper"	Harris	4:12
2.	"Murders in the Rue Morgue" (live at Egilshollin, Reykjavík, Iceland, 7 June 2005)	Harris	3:33

2005 digital download

No.	Title	Writer(s)	Length
1.	"The Trooper" (live at Egilshollin, Reykjavík, Iceland, 7 June 2005)	Harris	4:06

== Personnel ==
Production credits are adapted from the 7-inch vinyl cover.

Iron Maiden

- Bruce Dickinson – vocals
- Dave Murray – guitars
- Adrian Smith – guitars
- Steve Harris – bass guitar
- Nicko McBrain – drums

Production

- Martin Birch – producer, engineer
- Derek Riggs – cover illustration

== Charts ==
Single	Chart (1983)	Peak position	Album
"The Trooper"	Ireland (IRMA)	12	Piece of Mind
"The Trooper"	UK (Official Company Charts)	12	Piece of Mind
"The Trooper"	US Mainstream Rock Airplay (Billboard)	28	Piece of Mind
Single	Chart (1990)	Peak position	Album
"Flight of Icarus / The Trooper"	UK Albums Chart (Note: Re-release of both singles as part of The First Ten Years box set. Exceeded the length limit of the UK Singles Chart.)	7	—
Single	Chart (2005)	Peak position	Album
"The Trooper" (live)	Canada (Canadian Singles Chart)	5	Death on the Road
"The Trooper" (live)	Denmark (Tracklisten)	7	Death on the Road
"The Trooper" (live)	Finland (Suomen virallinen lista)	5	Death on the Road
"The Trooper" (live)	France (SNEP)	100	Death on the Road
"The Trooper" (live)	Germany (Media Control Charts)	78	Death on the Road
"The Trooper" (live)	Greece (IFPI)	8	Death on the Road
"The Trooper" (live)	Ireland (IRMA)	16	Death on the Road
"The Trooper" (live)	Italy (FIMI)	8	Death on the Road
"The Trooper" (live)	Spain (PROMUSICAE)	1	Death on the Road
"The Trooper" (live)	Sweden (Sverigetopplistan)	5	Death on the Road
"The Trooper" (live)	Switzerland (Schweizer Hitparade)	61	Death on the Road
"The Trooper" (live)	UK (Official Company Charts)	5	Death on the Road
"The Trooper" (live)	UK Rock & Metal (OCC)	1	
Single	Chart (2006)	Position	Album
"The Trooper" (live)	Spain (PROMUSICAE)	10	Death on the Road

== Certifications ==
Region	Certification	Certified units/sales
Australia (ARIA)	Gold	35,000^{‡}
Spain (Promusicae)	Gold	30,000^{‡}
New Zealand (RMNZ)	Platinum	30,000^{‡}
United Kingdom (BPI)	Gold	400,000^{‡}
^{‡} Sales+streaming figures based on certification alone.
