= The Number of the Beast (album) =

- Remastered cover (Note: The original cover was a misprint, the sky behind Eddie turning out blue instead of the intended grey. All editions from 1998 onward are color corrected to reflect the band's original intent.)

Studio album by Iron Maiden
- Released: 22 March 1982
- Recorded: 1981
- Studio: Battery (London)
- Genre: Heavy metal
- Length: 39:11
- Label: EMI
- Producer: Martin Birch

Iron Maiden chronology
Maiden Japan (1981)	The Number of the Beast (1982)	Piece of Mind (1983)

Singles from The Number of the Beast
- 1. "Run to the Hills" Released: 12 February 1982; 2. "The Number of the Beast" Released: 26 April 1982

The Number of the Beast is the third studio album by the English heavy metal band Iron Maiden. It was released on 22 March 1982 in the US by Harvest and Capitol Records, and on 29 March 1982 in the UK by EMI Records. The album was their first to feature vocalist Bruce Dickinson and their last with drummer Clive Burr.

The Number of the Beast was met with critical and commercial success, and became the band's first album to top the UK Albums Chart and reach the top 40 of the US Billboard 200. The album produced the singles "Run to the Hills" and "The Number of the Beast", the former of which became the band's first top-ten UK single. The album was also controversial, particularly in the United States, due to the religious references in its artwork and the title track's lyrics. Since the release of The Number of the Beast, "The Beast" has become a nickname for Iron Maiden, appearing in the titles of compilations and live albums including Best of the Beast and Visions of the Beast.

== Writing and recording ==
The Number of the Beast is Iron Maiden's only album to include songwriting credits for Clive Burr, and was the band's first album to feature writing by guitarist Adrian Smith. In addition, the release saw Steve Harris adopt a different approach to writing, which would cater more to new vocalist Bruce Dickinson. The album's producer Martin Birch remarked, "I simply didn't think [former vocalist Paul Di'Anno] was capable of handling lead vocals on some of the quite complicated directions I knew Steve wanted to explore ... When Bruce joined, it opened up the possibilities for the new album tremendously."

According to several interviews Dickinson was heavily involved in writing several of the album's songs, making a "moral contribution" to the tracks "Children of the Damned", "The Prisoner" and "Run to the Hills". Owing to his previous band Samson's ongoing contractual issues, Dickinson could not legally have any writing credit. The recording and mixing of the album had to be completed in only five weeks, after the band had spent too long constructing the new songs. This was allegedly because the group were for the first time creating a new album from scratch, with very little material written prior to the record's pre-production stage.

Music press reports told stories of unexplained phenomena occurring during the sessions at Battery Studios, such as lights turning on and off of their own accord, and the recording gear mysteriously breaking down. These odd occurrences climaxed with Birch being involved in a car accident with a mini-bus transporting a group of nuns, after which he was presented with a repair bill for £666.

== Artwork ==
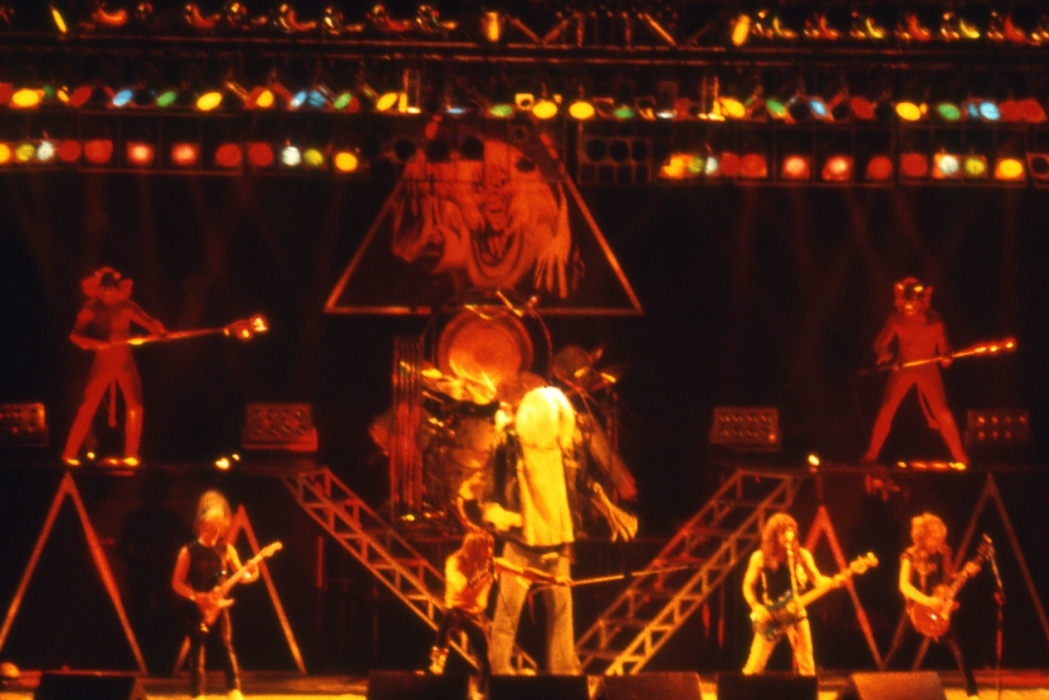
Iron Maiden performing at Spain in 1982

As with all of Iron Maiden's albums during the 1980s and early 1990s, the sleeve artwork was painted by Derek Riggs. The cover was originally created for the song "Purgatory", but manager Rod Smallwood deemed it of too high a calibre for the release of a mere single, and decided to save it for The Number of the Beast. The original 1982 artwork includes a blue sky in the background; a mistake by the printers of the cover, this was corrected to black when the album was remastered for compact disc in 1998.

The album attracted controversy, particularly in the United States, due to the lyrics of the title track and the cover art depicting Eddie controlling Satan like a puppet, while Satan is also controlling a smaller Eddie. Smallwood explains that the concept was to ask "who's the really evil one here? Who's manipulating who?" According to Riggs, this was inspired by a Doctor Strange comic book, "which had some big villain with Doctor Strange dangling on some strings like a puppet – it was something I read as a child back in the 1960s, I think," while the images of hell were "taken from my knowledge of medieval European Christian art which was full of such scenes". In addition, Satan was supposed to have wings made out of lightning and smoke (which can still be seen vaguely in the final piece) but due to time constraints, Riggs was unable to complete it as intended. He also made Satan look like Salvador Dalí as a joke.

According to US professor Bryan A. Bardine, "this album evokes power, passion and music that present darker themes and images."

The artwork has been parodied by crossover thrash band Stormtroopers of Death for the cover of their 1999 album Bigger than the Devil, and on a T-shirt by Streetwear brand Diamond Supply Co.

"It's probably thick," remarked Kiss bassist Gene Simmons of the sleeve. "It's probably got elves and dragons holding it up!"

In 2015, this cover art makes an appearance in the "Speed of Light" music video depicting Eddie fighting Satan (now known as "The Beast") in a form of Mortal Kombat video game.

== Songs ==
"Run to the Hills" was released as a single on 12 February 1982, two weeks before Iron Maiden's UK tour, acting as a preview for the forthcoming album, which would not be released until two days after the British dates ended. Released alongside a music video, made using live footage and clips from Buster Keaton films, the single performed remarkably well, earning the band their first top ten entry in the UK Singles Chart. As they were rushing to complete the album in time, as well as record and mix the single for an even earlier release, the band hastily selected "Total Eclipse" as the B-side.

As they had written too much material, they had to choose between "Total Eclipse" and "Gangland" for the "Run to the Hills" B-side, with the understanding that the other song would appear on the album. Several band-members have since expressed regret over the decision, with Steve Harris commenting, "We just chose the wrong track as the B-side. I think if 'Total Eclipse' had been on the album instead of 'Gangland' it would have been far better." On top of this, Harris has stated that the record's opening track, "Invaders", was not good enough, commenting that it "could have been replaced with something a bit better, only we didn't have anything else to replace it with at the time. We had just enough time to do what we did, and that was it." "Total Eclipse" was added to the 1998 CD reissue, and replaced "Gangland" on the 2022 40th Anniversary reissue vinyl.

While the title track was considered by many religious groups in the United States as evidence that Iron Maiden was a Satanic band, the song was in fact inspired by a nightmare that bassist Steve Harris had, triggered by watching the film Damien: Omen II late at night. In addition, Harris has stated that the lyrics were also influenced by Robert Burns' Tam o' Shanter. The track opens with a spoken introduction from the Book of Revelation, read by actor Barry Clayton. According to Dickinson, the band originally approached Vincent Price to record the passage, but were unwilling to pay Price's fee of £25,000. Although the liner notes state that the passage is from Revelation 13:18, the first line comes from 12:12.

The closing song "Hallowed Be Thy Name" has remained in all but three of the band's setlists since the album's recording (the only exceptions being the Maiden England World Tour 2012–14, the second leg of the Book of Souls World Tour in 2017, and the Future Past World Tour in 2023). AllMusic describes the track as "perhaps the most celebrated of the band's extended epics; it's the tale of a prisoner about to be hanged, featuring some of Harris' most philosophical lyrics." Several band-members have since stated that it is one of their favourite tracks, with Dickinson describing it as "fantastic" and that performing it live is like "narrating a movie to the audience." A live version of the song was released in 1993, gaining the band another top ten placement in the UK Singles Chart.

"Children of the Damned" is based on the films Village of the Damned and Children of the Damned, which in turn were adapted from the novel The Midwich Cuckoos by John Wyndham. On his last radio show for BBC Radio 6, during a segment in tribute to the late Ronnie James Dio, Dickinson mentioned that Children of the Damned was inspired by Black Sabbath's "Children of the Sea".

"The Prisoner" was inspired by the British TV show of the same name, and features dialogue from its title sequence. The band's manager, Rod Smallwood, had to telephone Patrick McGoohan to ask permission to use the audio clips for the song and was extremely hesitant during his conversation with whom Smallwood himself describes as "a real bona fide superstar actor". McGoohan was reported to have said "What did you say the name was? A rock band, you say? Do it." Iron Maiden later made another song based on the series, "Back in the Village" from 1984's Powerslave.

"22 Acacia Avenue", which is the second song in the "Charlotte the Harlot" saga, was originally written by Adrian Smith several years earlier while playing in his old band, Urchin. According to Smith, Steve Harris remembered hearing the song at an Urchin concert in a local park, and modified it for The Number of the Beast album. The Urchin song this song was based on was called "Countdown".

== Release and controversy ==
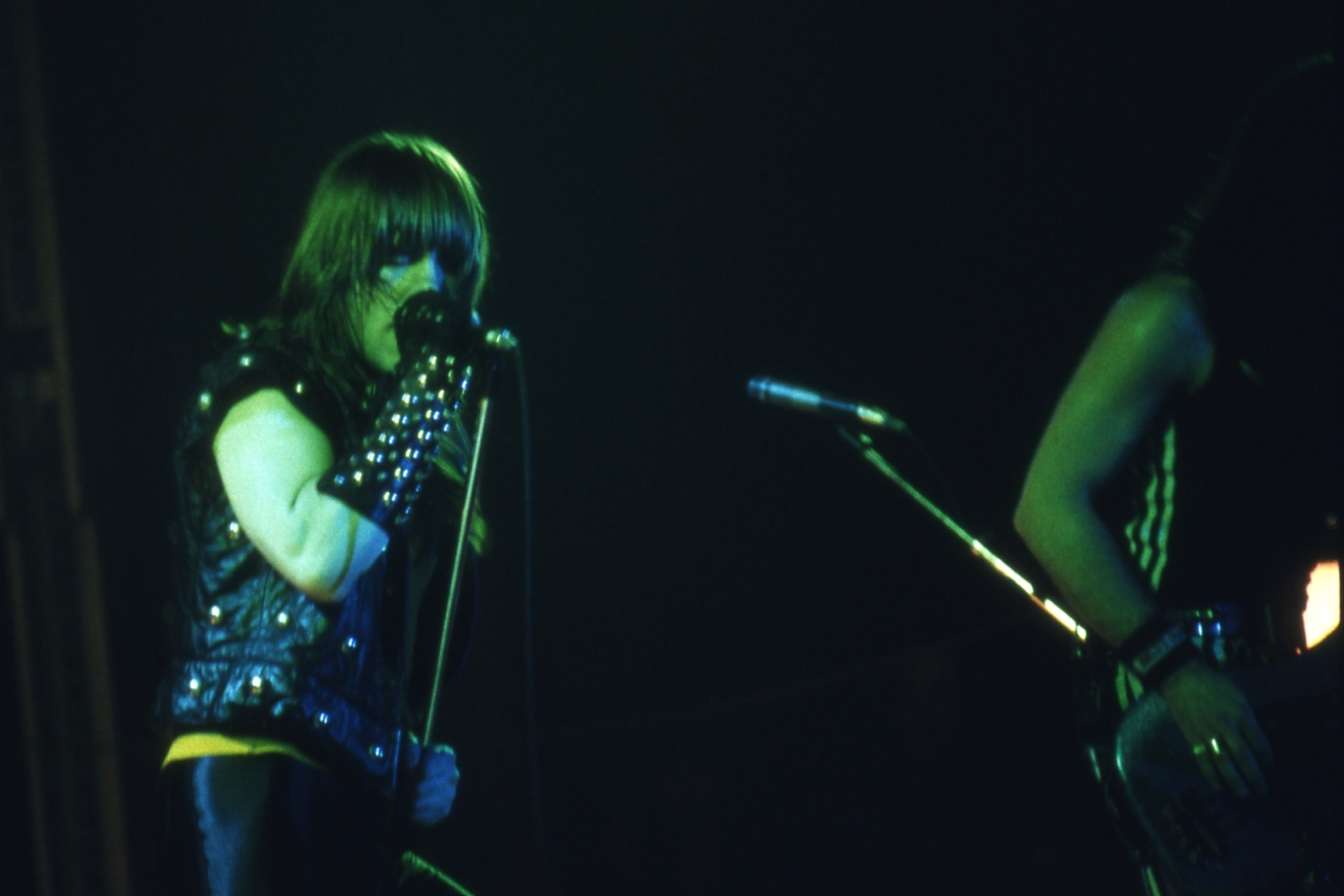
Bruce Dickinson and Steve Harris performing in 1982. The Beast on the Road tour was marred by several protests organised by religious activists in the US.

The Number of the Beast was released on 22 March 1982 through EMI and its sister label Capitol in the United States. The album was strongly opposed by some social conservatives in the United States, where Iron Maiden were accused of being Satanists. Public burnings of the band's catalogue were organised, although one religious group smashed the records with hammers, for fear of inhaling fumes from burning vinyl. It is unclear whether their caution was based on toxicological or theological concerns. The subsequent tour was subject to boycotts and demonstrations: venues were sometimes surrounded by activists who handed out leaflets and, in one case, a 25-foot cross was carried in protest. Harris has stated, "It was mad. They completely got the wrong end of the stick. They obviously hadn't read the lyrics. They just wanted to believe all that rubbish about us being Satanists."

The album was reissued in 1995 with a bonus CD containing two songs ("Total Eclipse", and a live version of "Remember Tomorrow") that had been the B-sides of the album's two singles. The US version of the 1995 reissue incorrectly gives Paul Di'Anno a songwriting credit for "Total Eclipse"; the song had actually been written by Harris, Murray, and Burr.

The album was also reissued in 1998 by EMI and Sanctuary/Columbia in the US as an enhanced CD version, which included photos, band history and the music videos for the songs "The Number of the Beast" and "Run to the Hills", in addition to "Total Eclipse", which was restored to the album's track listing (having been excluded from the original edition due to space constraints). This version mistakenly lists the track lengths for "22 Acacia Avenue" and "The Number of the Beast" as 4:49 and 3:50; they are in fact 6:38 and 4:51, respectively.

On March 18, 2022 (UK, Europe) and March 25th (USA) the band released a new cassette version of the album for the fortieth anniversary of the album's original release.

== Reception and legacy ==
Professional ratings
Review scores
Source	Rating
AllMusic	5/5 stars
Collector's Guide to Heavy Metal	8/10
Pitchfork	9.0/10
Rolling Stone	3.5/5 stars
Sounds	5/5 stars
Sputnikmusic	4.5/5 stars
The Daily Vault	A−
Metal.de	9/10
Ultimate Guitar	10/10

Since its release, the album has received consistent critical acclaim, with AllMusic describing it as "among the top five most essential heavy metal albums ever recorded. A cornerstone of the genre." Sputnikmusic calls it "a classic in the world of metal", while BBC Music praised the record's complex arrangements, stating "Whereas even some of the venerable HM institutions (think Black Sabbath) would struggle to make material that was something more than a collection of minor-key riffs, Iron Maiden pull this feat off with considerable élan." German reviewer Metal.de added "The Number of the Beast" definitively established Iron Maiden as the undisputed leaders of the New Wave of British Heavy Metal. With the exception of one complete dud, the album impresses from start to finish and serves as a masterclass in heavy metal songwriting." Randy of Ultimate Guitar praised the albums instrumentation writing "The musicianship on this album is amazing. Adrian Smith and Dave Murray really gave it their all to make an impression on people, and made some of the most exciting guitar leads and riffs I have ever heard."

Mikesn of Sputnikmusic also gave the album praise stating "The Number of the Beast was Iron Maiden's breakthrough album and a very important one in the band's career. It was their first album to reach #1 in the charts, and spawned hit singles such as the title track and "Run to the Hills", which are still played in concert to this very day. It was instrumental in developing both the band's unique sound, as well as a heavy metal genre just ready to take off." Kerrang! stated that "Number Of The Beast set Iron Maiden on the road to heavy metal glory."

In 1983, Kerrang! published a poll of the greatest metal albums of all time, with Piece of Mind ranking No.1 and The Number of the Beast at No. 2. Q magazine placed the album at No. 100 in its list of the "100 Greatest British Albums Ever" in 2000; in 2001 named it one of the "50 Heaviest Albums of All Time"; and in 2006 placed it at No. 40 in its "40 Best Albums of the '80s" list. In 2002 Spin Magazine dubbed it the 24th greatest metal album of all time. IGN and Metal Rules placed it third and second, respectively, in their lists of the Top Heavy Metal Albums, and Guitar World ranked it at No. 17 on their list of "100 Greatest Guitar Albums of All Time". NME listed the album at No. 14 on its list of 20 Greatest Metal Albums Ever. Classic Rock placed it at No. 15 in their list of the "100 Greatest British Rock Albums", describing it as "the most important metal album of the decade", and it was voted No. 1 in HMV's list of "The Best British Albums of the Past 60 Years" in 2012. The Number of the Beast is one of two Iron Maiden records listed in Robert Dimery's book, 1001 Albums You Must Hear Before You Die (1980's Iron Maiden being the other). In 2017, it was ranked 4th on Rolling Stone' list of "100 Greatest Metal Albums of All Time". In 2022 it was ranked 4th on Loudwire’s list of the Top 80 Hard Rock + Metal Albums of the 1980s. Number of the Beast ranked number 4th on Metal Hammer Germany’s list of the top 500 metal albums of all time in 2024. Revolver named Number of the Beast the tenth greatest metal album of all time on its list of the 69 Greatest Metal Albums Of All Time. In 2025, Consequne ranked it at number six on their list of the "75 Best Metal Albums of All Time".

In 2001, the BBC made a documentary about The Number of the Beast as part of the Classic Albums series, which was released on DVD in the same year.

During the celebrations of the 60th anniversary of the accession of Queen Elizabeth II on 6 February 1952, The Number of the Beast was voted the best British album of the past 60 years.

In 2022, coinciding with the 40th anniversary of the album's release, Number Of The Beast was named number one of 'The 25 greatest rock guitar albums of 1982' list in Guitar World.

== Commercial performance ==
The Number of the Beast was a big commercial success worldwide. The New York Times reported in 2010 that 14 million copies have been sold and by 2023 it had sold circa 20 million copies worldwide. It was the band's first record to top the UK charts, entering at No. 1 on 10 April, maintaining the top position for a further week, and remaining in the Top 75 for a total of 31 weeks. It entered the Billboard 200 at No. 150 and peaked at No. 33. The album reached the top ten in Austria and Sweden, and No. 11 and No. 13 in Canada and Norway, respectively.

It was certified platinum by the British Phonographic Industry (BPI) and gold by the Recording Industry Association of America (RIAA) on 4 October 1983 (eventually going platinum in 1986). The album reached No. 11 in Germany and was certified gold ten years later. It received a 3× platinum award in Canada for sales exceeding 300,000 units.

The two singles, "Run to the Hills" and the title track, debuted in the UK singles chart at No. 7 and No. 18, respectively. Both songs entered the Irish Singles Chart in the same order, and reached No. 16 and No. 19.

== Versions and performances by other artists ==
On 24 October 2002, progressive metal outfit Dream Theater played the original album in its entirety at La Mutualité in Paris, France. The performance was recorded and has been released through the band's YtseJam Records label.

"Children of the Damned" was covered by Swedish band Therion on their 1997 album A'arab Zaraq – Lucid Dreaming. "Run to the Hills" was covered on the tribute album Numbers From The Beast, featuring vocalist Robin McAuley, guitarists Michael Schenker and Pete Fletcher, bassist Tony Franklin and drummer Brian Tichy. A Tribute to the Beast, Vol. 2 features covers of "Children of the Damned", by Sebastian Bach of Skid Row fame, and "Hallowed Be Thy Name", by Iced Earth, who have also covered "Hallowed Be Thy Name" and "The Number of the Beast" on their own album, Tribute to the Gods. "Hallowed Be Thy Name" has also been covered by Machine Head on Maiden Heaven: A Tribute To Iron Maiden, which was released by Kerrang! magazine in 2008, and by Cradle of Filth, while the title track has also been covered by Billy Corgan's band Djali Zwan on the soundtrack of the film Spun. Acoustic reinterpretations of "Children of the Damned" and "22 Acacia Avenue" were included on the album Across The Seventh Sea (2012) by the tribute project Maiden uniteD.

== Appearances in other media ==
Several of the record's songs have been used in video games: "Run to the Hills" is featured in SSX On Tour as the opening theme, Grand Theft Auto: Episodes from Liberty City, and a cover version is included in Rock Band, the only song in the game listed as 'Impossible' for all instruments. In addition, "The Number of the Beast" (as the original master recording), "Run to the Hills" and "Hallowed Be Thy Name" (the latter being a live recording found on Flight 666) were made downloadable to Rock Band on 8 June 2009; "The Prisoner" was made downloadable on 22 May 2012. "The Number of the Beast" was also featured in Guitar Hero III: Legends of Rock (master recording), and on Tony Hawk's Pro Skater 4. The song features in the film 28 Years Later: The Bone Temple.

Black Kray wears a shirt with the album’s art on the cover of his mixtape “Crack Cloud$ Over Arts Kitchen.”

== Track listing ==
All tracks are written by Steve Harris, except where noted.

Side one
No.	Title	Writer(s)	Length
1.	"Invaders"		3:20
2.	"Children of the Damned"		4:34
3.	"The Prisoner"	Adrian Smith; Harris	6:03
4.	"22 Acacia Avenue"	Harris; Smith	6:34

Side two
No.	Title	Writer(s)	Length
5.	"The Number of the Beast"		4:25
6.	"Run to the Hills"		3:50
7.	"Gangland"	Smith; Clive Burr	3:46
8.	"Hallowed Be Thy Name"		7:08
Total length:			39:40

Notes

- Bruce Dickinson was a co-writer on "Children of the Damned", "The Prisoner", and "Run to the Hills", although he could not receive writing credits for contractual reasons.
- Above the song's lyrics in the liner notes, "22 Acacia Avenue" is subtitled "The continuing saga of Charlotte the Harlot".

Side two – Japanese edition
No.	Title	Writer(s)	Length
5.	"The Number of the Beast"		4:25
6.	"Run to the Hills"		3:50
7.	"Total Eclipse"	Harris; Dave Murray; Burr	4:25
8.	"Gangland"	Smith; Burr	3:46
9.	"Hallowed Be Thy Name"		7:08
Total length:			43:36

Side two – 2022 40th anniversary edition
No.	Title	Writer(s)	Length
5.	"The Number of the Beast"		4:25
6.	"Run to the Hills"		3:50
7.	"Total Eclipse"	Harris; Murray; Burr	4:25
8.	"Hallowed Be Thy Name"		7:08
Total length:			39:50

1995 reissue bonus disc
No.	Title	Writer(s)	Length
1.	"Total Eclipse"	Harris; Murray; Burr	4:26
2.	"Remember Tomorrow" (live)	Harris; Paul Di'Anno	5:29
Total length:			9:55

1998 remastered edition
No.	Title	Writer(s)	Length
1.	"Invaders"		3:22
2.	"Children of the Damned"		4:33
3.	"The Prisoner"	Smith; Harris	6:00
4.	"22 Acacia Avenue"	Harris; Smith	6:38
5.	"The Number of the Beast"		4:51
6.	"Run to the Hills"		3:50
7.	"Gangland"	Smith; Burr	3:47
8.	"Total Eclipse"	Harris; Murray; Burr	4:28
9.	"Hallowed Be Thy Name"		7:10
Total length:			44:39

== Personnel ==
Production and performance credits are adapted from the album liner notes.

=== Iron Maiden ===
- Bruce Dickinson – vocals
- Dave Murray – guitars
- Adrian Smith – guitars
- Steve Harris – bass guitar
- Clive Burr – drums

=== Additional performer ===
- Barry Clayton – spoken word on "The Number of the Beast"

=== Production ===
- Martin "Farmer" Birch – production, engineering
- Nigel Hewitt-Green – second engineering
- Derek Riggs – illustration
- Simon Fowler – photography
- Ross Halfin – photography
- Toshi Yajima – photography
- Andre Csillag – photography
- Bob Ellis – photography
- P.G. Brunelli – photography
- Rod Smallwood – cover concept, photography
- Simon Heyworth – remastering (1998 edition)
- Denis O'Regan – photography (1998 edition)
- George Chin – photography (1998 edition)

== Charts ==
=== Weekly charts ===
Chart (1982–1983)	Peak position
Australian Albums (Kent Music Report)	8
Austrian Albums (Ö3 Austria)	3
Canada Top Albums/CDs (RPM)	11
Dutch Albums (Album Top 100)	6
French Albums (SNEP)	4
Finnish Albums (The Official Finnish Charts)	5
German Albums (Offizielle Top 100)	11
Italian Albums (Musica e dischi)	10
Japanese Albums (Oricon)	28
New Zealand Albums (RMNZ)	18
Norwegian Albums (VG-lista)	13
Swedish Albums (Sverigetopplistan)	7
UK Albums (Official Charts)	1
US Billboard 200	33

Chart (1987)	Peak position
UK Albums (Official Charts)	98

Chart (2006)	Peak position
Spanish Albums (Promusicae)	56
UK Albums (Official Charts)	54

Chart (2010)	Peak position
Greek Albums (IFPI)	33
Mexican Albums (Top 100 Mexico)	95

Chart (2012)	Peak position
Swedish Albums (Sverigetopplistan)	32

Chart (2015)	Peak position
French Albums (SNEP)	172

Chart (2018–2022)	Peak position
Belgian Albums (Ultratop Flanders)	122
Belgian Albums (Ultratop Wallonia)	51
Croatian International Albums (HDU)ERROR in "Croatia": Missing parameters: id.	5
German Albums (Offizielle Top 100)	23
Greek Albums (IFPI)	20
Hungarian Albums (MAHASZ)	21
Scottish Albums (Official Charts)	13
Spanish Albums (Promusicae)	10
Swiss Albums (Schweizer Hitparade)	23
UK Rock & Metal Albums (Official Charts)	1

=== Year-end charts ===
Chart (1982)	Position
German Albums (Offizielle Top 100)	58

== Certifications ==
Region	Certification	Certified units/sales
Australia (ARIA)	Platinum	50,000^{^}
Austria (IFPI Austria)	Gold	25,000^{*}
Belgium (BRMA)	Gold	25,000^{*}
Canada (Music Canada)	3× Platinum	300,000^{^}
France (SNEP)	Gold	100,000^{*}
Germany (BVMI)	Gold	250,000^{^}
Italy (FIMI)	Gold	25,000^{‡}
Japan (RIAJ)	Gold	100,000
Netherlands (NVPI)	Gold	50,000^{^}
New Zealand (RMNZ)	Gold	7,500^{^}
Poland (ZPAV)	Gold	10,000^{‡}
Spain (Promusicae)	Gold	50,000^{^}
Switzerland (IFPI Switzerland)	Gold	25,000^{^}
United Kingdom (BPI)	Platinum	300,000^{^}
United States (RIAA)	Platinum	1,000,000^{^}
^{*} Sales figures based on certification alone.^{^} Shipments figures based on certification alone.^{‡} Sales+streaming figures based on certification alone.
