= Rainmaker (Iron Maiden song) =

Single by Iron Maiden

from the album Dance of Death
- B-side: "Dance of Death" (orchestral version); "More Tea Vicar"
- Released: 24 November 2003
- Genre: Heavy metal
- Length: 3:48
- Label: EMI
- Songwriters: Dave Murray; Steve Harris; Bruce Dickinson
- Producers: Steve Harris; Kevin Shirley

Iron Maiden singles chronology
"Wildest Dreams" (2003)	"Rainmaker" (2003)	"The Number of the Beast (reissue)" (2005)

DVD cover

"Rainmaker" is the 37th single by English heavy metal band Iron Maiden. It was released on 24 November 2003 as the second and final single from their 13th studio album, Dance of Death (2003). It was written by Dave Murray, Steve Harris and Bruce Dickinson, and produced by Harris and Kevin Shirley.

== Synopsis ==
The song was largely written by long-time guitarist Dave Murray. The lyrics were inspired by vocalist Bruce Dickinson's comment that the intro riff made him think of raindrops. The song has no connection with the 1995 novel written by John Grisham of the same name.

The guitar solo in "Rainmaker" is played by Dave Murray.

The cover is a still taken from the music video directed by Howard Greenhalgh. This single also contains a double-sided poster.

"More Tea Vicar" is a recording of a jam session (similar to "Pass the Jam") with Bruce Dickinson trying his hand at rapping.

== Track listing ==
=== CD single ===
1. "Rainmaker" (Dave Murray, Steve Harris, Bruce Dickinson) – 3:48
2. "Dance of Death" (orchestral version) (Janick Gers, Harris) – 8:37
3. "More Tea Vicar" (Dickinson, Gers, Harris, Nicko McBrain, Murray, Adrian Smith) – 4:37

=== Japanese CD ===
1. "Rainmaker" (Murray, Harris, Dickinson) – 3:48
2. "Dance of Death" (orchestral version) (Gers, Harris) – 8:37
3. "More Tea Vicar" (Dickinson, Gers, Harris, McBrain, Murray, Smith) – 4:37
4. "The Wicker Man" (live at Brixton Academy, London – 19–21 March 2002) – 4:38
5. "Children of the Damned" (live at Brixton Academy, London – 19–21 March 2002) – 5:02

Japanese CD extras:

1. "Rainmaker" (video) – 3:50
2. "Wildest Dreams" (video) – 3:39

=== Pock iT! mini CD ===
1. "Rainmaker" (Murray, Harris, Dickinson) – 3:48
2. "Dance of Death" (orchestral version two) (Gers, Harris) – 8:37

=== 7" vinyl ===
1. "Rainmaker" (Murray, Harris, Dickinson) – 3:48
2. "Dance of Death" (orchestral version) (Gers, Harris) – 8:37

=== DVD ===
1. "Rainmaker" (video) (Murray, Harris, Dickinson) – 3:48
2. "The Wicker Man" (live at Brixton Academy, London – 19–21 March 2002) (Smith, Harris, Dickinson) – 4:35
3. "Children of the Damned" (live at Brixton Academy, London – 19–21 March 2002) (Harris) – 5:03
4. "Rainmaker Video – The Making Of"

== Personnel ==
Production credits are adapted from the CD, DVD, and picture disc covers.

Iron Maiden

- Bruce Dickinson – vocals
- Dave Murray – lead guitar
- Janick Gers – rhythm guitar
- Adrian Smith – rhythm guitar
- Steve Harris – bass, co-producer
- Nicko McBrain – drums

Production

- Kevin Shirley – producer, engineer, mixing (except "The Wicker Man")
- Doug Hall – producer, mixing ("The Wicker Man")
- Howard Greenhalgh – music video director
- Lawrence Watson – photography

== Chart performance ==
Weekly chart performance for "Rainmaker"
Chart (2003–2004)	Peak position
Canada (Nielsen SoundScan)	7
Denmark (Tracklisten)	12
Finland (Suomen virallinen lista)	3
France (SNEP)	71
Germany (GfK)	36
Hungary (Single Top 40)	2
Italy (FIMI)	13
Netherlands (Single Top 100)	98
Spain (Promusicae)	2
Sweden (Sverigetopplistan)	35
Switzerland (Schweizer Hitparade)	94
UK Singles (Official Charts)	13
UK Rock & Metal (Official Charts)	1
