= Simon Fowler (photographer) =

British photographer

Simon Fowler (born Simon R. Fowler in 1954) is an English photographer/director, known for his work with numerous singers and bands. Fowler's photography has been featured on the cover of many music albums and singles.

== Early life and career ==
Fowler was born in Hastings. After completing an Art Foundation course at High Wycombe College of Art and Technology he then studied photography at Amersham College of Art and Technology. In 1974 he got his first job as a darkroom assistant at London Features International a photographic syndication agency founded in 1971 by businessman John Halsall and photographer Mike Putland. Putland left LFI in 1976 to start the RETNA. agency. At around the same time Fowler left working out of his own B/W portrait studio in Henley-on-Thames.

In 1978/9 he went into partnership with fellow photographer and LFI employee, Paul Cox, initially working from a small office at LFI's Baker Street studios in return for their syndication rights. Specialising in music photography, they worked under the name of SLAG (Studio, Location and Gigs,) in keeping with the current anti- establishment Punk movement. They later moved premises to Bow Street Studios under The Royal Opera House Covent Garden and then to Fulham via Chester Square Belgravia.

By 1986, having gone their separate ways Fowler and Cox were part of the dream team on the design side of the PWL empire, Pete Waterman's production company, photographing Kylie Minogue, Jason Donovan and Rick Astley.

At the time Fowler had moved in alongside Design Consultancy Stylorouge in Paddington for several years, his other clients included Boy George, Spandau Ballet, Iron Maiden, Toyah, Howard Jones, Paul Young, and Wet Wet Wet.

In 1993 he began a long working relationship with actress and singer Sarah Brightman, seeing him moving into directing with a TV commercial and promo for her 2008 album Symphony. He went on to photograph a number of other classical artists including Lesley Garrett, Katherine Jenkins and Elina Garanca. His clientele continues to be diverse including jazz singer/pianist Jamie Cullum, Irish musician Enya, Coleen Rooney and Thom Yorke.

== Personal life ==
Fowler lives in Surrey with his wife Karen and three children. His eldest son, Beau Fowler, is a film director/actor/writer, daughter Francesca Fowler is an actress/writer and youngest son Max Fowler is an actor.
