= The Number of the Beast (song) =

Single by Iron Maiden

from the album The Number of the Beast
- B-side: 1982; "Remember Tomorrow" (live); 2005 CD; "The Number of the Beast" (live); "Hallowed Be Thy Name" (live); 2005 7"; "The Number of the Beast" (live); 2005 12"; "The Number of the Beast" (live); "Remember Tomorrow"
- Released: 26 April 1982; 3 January 2005
- Recorded: 1981
- Genre: Heavy metal
- Length: 4:49
- Label: EMI
- Songwriter: Steve Harris
- Producer: Martin Birch

Iron Maiden singles chronology
"Run to the Hills" (1982)	"The Number of the Beast" (1982)	"Flight of Icarus" (1983)
"Rainmaker" (2003)	"The Number of the Beast (reissue)" (2005)	"The Trooper (live in 2003)" (2005)

Music video
- "The Number of the Beast" on YouTube

"The Number of the Beast" is a song by the English heavy metal band Iron Maiden. It is Iron Maiden's seventh single release, and the second single from their 1982 studio album of the same name. It was reissued in 2005 and also prior to that in 1990 in The First Ten Years box set on CD and 12" vinyl, in which it was combined with the previous single, "Run to the Hills".

Upon release in 1982, the song caused controversy in the United States where its subject matter caused outrage amongst religious groups. In spite of this, it remains one of the band's more popular songs, reaching No. 18 in the UK Singles Chart on its original release, and No. 3 on two successive occasions in 1990 and 2005. It has been performed on almost all of their concert tours. Additionally, the song has been covered numerous times and has appeared in several video games and films.

== Writing and recording ==
According to the song's writer, bassist and band-founder Steve Harris, it was inspired by a nightmare he had after watching the film Damien: Omen II late at night, in addition to the poem "Tam o' Shanter" by Robert Burns.

The song opens with a spoken word passage, read by English actor Barry Clayton, which quotes Revelation 12:12 and Revelation 13:18. According to lead vocalist, Bruce Dickinson, the band originally asked Vincent Price to read the intro, but decided to hire Clayton after Price refused to do it for anything less than £25,000.

The track is known for its very long, high-pitched and guttural wail at the end of the intro, which AllMusic describes as "the most blood-curdling Dickinson scream on record". In the Classic Albums documentary based on The Number of the Beast album, Dickinson states that it came about through frustration with producer Martin Birch, who forced him to sing the introduction repeatedly for hours on end.

The promotional video was filmed in March 1982 in Newcastle City Hall and directed by David Mallet. The video also contained footage from notable horror and thriller films such as Nosferatu, Mothra vs. Godzilla, The Crimson Ghost, and How to Make a Monster. Near the end of the music video, a giant Eddie appeared on-stage for the first time.

== Single details ==
The single's cover is the last of three singles to feature Riggs' depiction of Satan, which debuted on the cover of the "Purgatory" single. The cover of The Number of the Beast is the aftermath to the cover of the "Run to the Hills" single where Eddie and Satan are depicted in battle. The single was also released in red vinyl.

The live version of "Remember Tomorrow" was recorded during the Killer World Tour in Padua, Italy, on 29 October 1981 with Dickinson on vocals. Dickinson had sung live for the first time on an Iron Maiden tour only three nights earlier, on 26 October in Bologna, a month and a half following the dismissal of previous vocalist Paul Di'Anno. It is also the last single to feature Clive Burr on drums, as he was replaced by Nicko McBrain at the end of The Beast on the Road tour in 1982.

In 2005, to tie in with the 2004 DVD The History of Iron Maiden – Part 1: The Early Days, "The Number of the Beast" was re-released, along with live versions of the song and "Hallowed Be Thy Name", recorded in 2002.

== Legacy ==
"The Number of the Beast" is one of the band's most popular songs, appearing at No. 7 on VH1's 40 Greatest Metal Songs and No. 6 in Martin Popoff's book The Top 500 Heavy Metal Songs of All Time, a list said to be compiled from 15,000 votes submitted by musicians, music journalists and the general public.

Since its release, the song has been covered by Dream Theater, Avulsed, Iced Earth, Sinergy, Powderfinger, Djali Zwan (whose version was used for the soundtrack of the cult film Spun), The Iron Maidens and many other bands. In addition, it was covered on a String Quartet Tribute to the band.

The song has been featured in video games, such as Tony Hawk's Pro Skater 4, Guitar Hero III: Legends of Rock, and can be downloaded to Rock Band (originally offered as a cover version, the original master recording complete with spoken introduction was also uploaded along with "Run to the Hills" and a live performance version of "Hallowed Be Thy Name"). On top of this, it can be heard in the film Murder by Numbers and the British TV series Sherlock. In 2017, the song was featured in the episode "Sons a Witches" of the American animated television series South Park. The Netflix film Rebel Ridge opens with the main character listening to the song on a "metal mix" on his phone while cycling. The song was used in the film 28 Years Later: The Bone Temple (2026), featured in a sequence where Dr. Ian Kelson (played by Ralph Fiennes) feigns being the living version of Satan / Old Nick in order to appease his "son" Sir Lord Jimmy Crystal (Jack O'Connell).

== Controversy ==
In addition to the album's artwork and title, the song was a prominent target of religious groups in the United States who accused Iron Maiden of being a Satanic group. The controversy led to organised burnings of the group's albums as well as several protests during their 1982 tour, although this would only serve to give the band more publicity. Harris has since commented that the accusations made against them were mad. "They completely got the wrong end of the stick. They obviously hadn't read the lyrics. They just wanted to believe all that rubbish about us being Satanists".

On their following album, Piece of Mind, the band placed a backmasked message at the beginning of the song "Still Life," in which the band's drummer, McBrain, gives a drunken impression of Idi Amin. According to McBrain, the message, in which he says "'What ho', said the t'ing wid the t'ree bonce, 'Don't meddle wid t'ings yo don't understand'", was directed at those who had labelled Iron Maiden as devil worshippers, commenting, "We thought, if people were going to be stupid about this sort of thing, we might as well give them something to be really stupid about, you know?".

When "The Number of the Beast"'s music video was first shown on MTV, Eddie's appearance at the end was edited out after complaints from frightened viewers.

== Track listing ==
7" single

Side one
No.	Title	Writer(s)	Length
1.	"The Number of the Beast"	Steve Harris	4:49

Side two
No.	Title	Writer(s)	Length
2.	"Remember Tomorrow" (live at Palasport di Padua, Padua, 29 October 1981)	Harris; Paul Di'Anno	5:26

2005 enhanced CD

Compact disc
No.	Title	Writer(s)	Length
1.	"The Number of the Beast"	Harris	4:53
2.	"The Number of the Beast" (live at the Brixton Academy, London, 19–21 March 2002)	Harris	4:48
3.	"Hallowed Be Thy Name" (live at the Brixton Academy, London, 19–21 March 2002)	Harris	7:39
4.	"The Number of the Beast" (video)	Harris	Unknown
5.	"The Number of the Beast" (video – live at the Brixton Academy, London, 19–21 March 2002)	Harris	4:48

2005 7" red vinyl

Side one
No.	Title	Writer(s)	Length
1.	"The Number of the Beast"	Harris	4:49

Side two
No.	Title	Writer(s)	Length
2.	"The Number of the Beast" (live at the Brixton Academy, London, 19–21 March 2002)	Harris	4:48

2005 12" picture disc

Side one
No.	Title	Writer(s)	Length
1.	"The Number of the Beast"	Harris	4:49

Side two
No.	Title	Writer(s)	Length
2.	"The Number of the Beast" (live at the Brixton Academy, London, 19–21 March 2002)	Harris	4:48
3.	"Remember Tomorrow" (live at Palasport di Padua, Padua, 29 October 1981)	Harris; Di'Anno	5:26

== Personnel ==
Production credits are adapted from the 7-inch vinyl and reissue picture disc covers.

Iron Maiden

- Bruce Dickinson – vocals
- Dave Murray – guitar
- Adrian Smith – guitar
- Steve Harris – bass guitar
- Clive Burr – drums

Additional personnel

- Barry Clayton – spoken word introduction

Production

- Martin Birch – producer, engineer
- Derek Riggs – cover illustration
- Kevin Shirley – mixing (live – 2002)
- Tony Newton – mixing (live – 2002)

== Charts ==
Weekly chart performance for "The Number of the Beast"
Single	Chart (1982)	Peak position	Album
"The Number of the Beast"	UK Singles Chart	18	The Number of the Beast
"The Number of the Beast"	Irish Singles Chart	19	The Number of the Beast
Single	Chart (1990)	Peak position	Album
"Run to the Hills / The Number of the Beast"	UK Albums Chart (Note: Re-release of both singles as part of The First Ten Years box set. Exceeded the length limit of the UK Singles Chart.)	3	—
Single	Chart (2005)	Peak position	Album
"The Number of the Beast" (Note: Re-release of original studio version along with 2002 live version.)	Finnish Singles Chart	2	—
"The Number of the Beast"	French Singles Chart	78	—
"The Number of the Beast"	German Singles Chart	76	—
"The Number of the Beast"	Greek Top 50 Singles Chart	3	—
"The Number of the Beast"	Irish Singles Chart	11	—
"The Number of the Beast"	Italian Singles Chart	5	—
"The Number of the Beast"	Norwegian Singles Chart	13	—
"The Number of the Beast"	Swedish Singles Chart	40	—
"The Number of the Beast"	Swiss Singles Chart	42	—
"The Number of the Beast"	UK Singles Chart	3	—
"The Number of the Beast"	UK Rock Chart	1	—

Annual chart rankings for "The Number of the Beast"
Single	Chart (2005)	Rank	Album
"The Number of the Beast" (Note: Re-release of original studio version along with 2002 live version.)	Italian Singles Chart	92	–

== Certifications ==
Region	Certification	Certified units/sales
Australia (ARIA)	Gold	35,000^{‡}
New Zealand (RMNZ)	Gold	15,000^{‡}
United Kingdom (BPI)	Silver	200,000^{‡}
^{‡} Sales+streaming figures based on certification alone.
