= Nights of the Dead =

Nights of the Dead, Legacy of the Beast: Live in Mexico City

Live album by Iron Maiden
- Released: 20 November 2020
- Recorded: 27–30 September 2019
- Venue: Palacio de los Deportes, Mexico City
- Genre: Heavy metal
- Length: 100:46
- Label: Parlophone
- Producer: Tony Newton

Iron Maiden chronology
The Book of Souls: Live Chapter (2017)	Nights of the Dead (2020)	Senjutsu (2021)

Nights of the Dead, Legacy of the Beast: Live in Mexico City is a live album by English heavy metal band Iron Maiden, released on 20 November 2020. It was recorded on 27, 29 and 30 September 2019 in Mexico City, during the Legacy of the Beast World Tour.

== Background ==
On 5 July 2016, Iron Maiden released Legacy of the Beast, a role playing video game for Android and iOS, in collaboration with Nodding Frog, 50cc Games and Roadhouse Interactive. The game is set in a fictional world inspired by Iron Maiden album covers and songs, and follows the band's mascot, Eddie the Head, as he goes on a quest to find and reclaim the shards of his shattered soul. It later became a comic book series, first released on 31 October 2017.

Two weeks later, on 13 November, the band announced the Legacy of the Beast World Tour, which started in Tallinn, Estonia on 26 May 2018 and had its concept and stage set design loosely inspired by the game's "different but interlocking 'worlds'". Described as a "history/hits" tour by manager Rod Smallwood, the setlist included several songs that hadn't been played live by the band in many years, most notably "Flight of Icarus", which had been absent from the band's setlists since the Somewhere on Tour in 1986–87.

It was the first tour since the Brave New World Tour in 2000–01 to include two Blaze Bayley-era songs ("Sign of the Cross" and "The Clansman") in the setlist, and the first to include any song from that period since the Dance of Death World Tour in 2003–04, when "Lord of the Flies" was played.

Nights of the Dead marks the first appearance of a song ("For the Greater Good of God") from the 2006 album A Matter of Life and Death on an Iron Maiden live album. When "Different World" was released as a single in 2006, live recordings of that and "The Reincarnation of Benjamin Breeg" were included as B-sides on the digital and DVD singles, respectively.

== Track listing ==
All tracks are written by Steve Harris, except where noted.

Disc one
No.	Title	Writer(s)	Length
1.	"Churchill's Speech" (intro)	Winston Churchill	0:38
2.	"Aces High"		4:58
3.	"Where Eagles Dare"		5:12
4.	"2 Minutes to Midnight"	Adrian Smith; Bruce Dickinson	5:54
5.	"The Clansman"		9:16
6.	"The Trooper"		4:02
7.	"Revelations"	Dickinson	6:32
8.	"For the Greater Good of God"		9:23
9.	"The Wicker Man"	Smith; Harris; Dickinson	4:43
Total length:			50:38

Disc two
No.	Title	Writer(s)	Length
1.	"Sign of the Cross"		11:00
2.	"Flight of Icarus"	Smith; Dickinson	3:43
3.	"Fear of the Dark"		7:46
4.	"The Number of the Beast"		4:59
5.	"Iron Maiden"		5:30
6.	"The Evil That Men Do"	Smith; Dickinson; Harris	4:25
7.	"Hallowed Be Thy Name"		7:38
8.	"Run to the Hills"		5:07
Total length:			50:08

== Personnel ==
Iron Maiden

- Bruce Dickinson – vocals
- Dave Murray – guitars
- Adrian Smith – guitars, backing vocals
- Janick Gers – guitars
- Steve Harris – bass, backing vocals
- Nicko McBrain – drums

Additional personnel

- Michael Kenney – keyboards

== Charts ==
Chart performance for Nights of the Dead
Chart (2020)	Peak position
Australian Albums (ARIA)	52
Austrian Albums (Ö3 Austria)	9
Belgian Albums (Ultratop Flanders)	10
Belgian Albums (Ultratop Wallonia)	7
Canadian Albums (Billboard)	95
Croatian International Albums (HDU)	2
Czech Albums (ČNS IFPI)	18
Dutch Albums (Album Top 100)	14
Finnish Albums (Suomen virallinen lista)	6
French Albums (SNEP)	15
German Albums (Offizielle Top 100)	6
Greek Albums (IFPI)	2
Hungarian Albums (MAHASZ)	2
Irish Albums (OCC)	29
Italian Albums (FIMI)	14
Norwegian Albums (VG-lista)	12
Polish Albums (ZPAV)	21
Portuguese Albums (AFP)	7
Scottish Albums (OCC)	4
Spanish Albums (PROMUSICAE)	8
Swedish Albums (Sverigetopplistan)	5
Swiss Albums (Schweizer Hitparade)	4
UK Albums (OCC)	7
US Billboard 200	53
US Top Rock Albums (Billboard)	5
