= Eddfest =

2007 rock/metal festival in Bangalore, India

- Genre: Heavy metal/Rock music
- Dates: 17 March 2007; 10–11 July 2026
- Locations: Bangalore, India (2007); Knebworth, England (2026)
- Years active: 2007; 2026
- Founders: DNA Networks/Sanctuary Management
- Attendance: 38,000 (India)
- Website: http://www.dnanetworks.com/ https://www.ironmaiden.knebworth.com/

Eddfest is a metal festival headlined by British heavy metal band Iron Maiden which first took place at the Bangalore Palace Grounds in Bangalore, India on 17 March 2007. The concert was part of the band's A Matter Of Life And Death Tour. The name Eddfest is taken from the band's mascot Eddie. It marked the first visit of Iron Maiden to the Indian subcontinent, and the first major heavy metal concert to take place in the country. Other bands which played at the concert included Lauren Harris, Indian Rock veterans Parikrama and Ftn. In 2026, Eddfest returned, this time taking place in Knebworth, England as part of Knebworth Festival during the bands Run for Your Lives World Tour.

The concert garnered much media frenzy and mainstream attention not only in India, but all over the world with many international journalists flying into Bangalore. The event was also covered in the documentary film Global Metal by Sam Dunn and Scott McFadyen, which also features live recordings of the concert. Apart from fans from all over India, people traveled for this event from neighboring countries like Sri Lanka, Nepal, Pakistan, Thailand and China.

== Setlist ==
Eddfest Bangalore
- Gustav Holst's "Mars, the Bringer of War" served as the intro for the tour.
1. "Different World" (from A Matter of Life and Death, 2006)
2. "These Colours Don't Run" (from A Matter of Life and Death, 2006)
3. "Brighter Than a Thousand Suns" (from A Matter of Life and Death, 2006)
4. "Wrathchild" (from Killers, 1981)
5. "The Trooper" (from Piece of Mind, 1983)
6. "The Reincarnation of Benjamin Breeg" (from A Matter of Life and Death, 2006)
7. "For the Greater Good of God" (from A Matter of Life and Death, 2006)
8. "The Number of the Beast" (from The Number of the Beast, 1982)
9. "Fear of the Dark" (from Fear of the Dark, 1992)
10. "Run to the Hills" (from The Number of the Beast, 1982)
11. "Iron Maiden" (from Iron Maiden, 1980)

Encore

1. "2 Minutes to Midnight" (from Powerslave, 1984)
2. " The Evil That Men Do" (from Seventh Son of a Seventh Son, 1988)
3. "Hallowed Be Thy Name" (from The Number of the Beast, 1982)

== Venue ==
The venue for the historic concert was the Bangalore Palace Grounds located in north Bangalore. The entire venue was enclosed within the grounds and was initially only meant for accommodating 25,000 people. But the enormous demand for tickets lead to the venue being over crowded with 35,000 people inside and around 4,000 people outside who could not enter as tickets were all sold out.

The front crowd barrier just in front of the stage had to be refortified by dozens of security staff members standing their ground supporting the barrier and placing bamboo and wooden sticks to hold the barrier due to overcrowding.

== Significance ==
Apart from being the largest music concert to be held in India, the event was also responsible for opening the gates for other international hard rock and heavy metal bands to tour in India. Iron Maiden themselves were overwhelmed by the crowd response and have since played 2 more times in the country. It was also the first concert in India to have official merchandise stores at the venue. The festival is also seen as a precursor and the basis on which the now yearly Rock In India festival is based on, as Eddfest was the first of its kind rock festival in the country. The Rock In India festival takes place at the same venue as Eddfest. The event grossed over Rs 45,000,000 in ticket sales and another Rs 900,000 in merchandise revenue making it the most profitable concert in India with regards to total gate revenue. Ticketpro international reported that the remarkable success of the event was highlighted by the fact that almost 80 percent of the tickets were sold well before the concert, which is very unusual for India. Live audio updates on the radio were constantly broadcast from the venue on Radio Indigo throughout the day.

== Sponsors ==
The Eddfest event was produced by DNA Networks India in conjunction with NOUS Productions, and sponsored by Vh1, Nokia India, Reliance Mobile, Pepsi, NDTV 24x7, Radio Indigo, Royal Challenge and Sanyo. Travel sponsors were Lufthansa Airlines.

On-line ticketing was handled by ticketpro India and on-line marketing was done by indiatimes.com. Levi's was the merchandising partner of the event.

== See also ==
- Global Metal, documentary by anthropologist Sam Dunn which feature the festival.
