= The Book of Souls =

Studio album by Iron Maiden
- Released: 4 September 2015
- Recorded: September–December 2014
- Studio: Guillaume Tell (Paris)
- Genre: Heavy metal
- Length: 92:11
- Labels: Parlophone; BMG (US)
- Producer: Kevin Shirley

Iron Maiden chronology
Maiden England '88 (2013)	The Book of Souls (2015)	The Book of Souls: Live Chapter (2017)

Singles from The Book of Souls
- 1. "Speed of Light" Released: 14 August 2015; 2. "Empire of the Clouds" Released: 16 April 2016

The Book of Souls is the sixteenth studio album by English heavy metal band Iron Maiden, released on 4 September 2015. It is the band's first studio double album on CD (their first studio double LP being Fear of the Dark in 1992); it is also their longest album to date, with a total length of 92 minutes and 11 seconds. Its launch and supporting tour were delayed to allow vocalist Bruce Dickinson time to recover from the removal of a cancerous tumour in early 2015. It is also their first album to be released on Parlophone, since the end of their 30-year relationship with EMI Records.

Produced by long-time Iron Maiden collaborator Kevin Shirley, The Book of Souls was recorded at Guillaume Tell Studios, Paris from September to December 2014, which they had previously used for 2000's Brave New World. The band wrote and immediately recorded many tracks in the studio, resulting in a spontaneous live feel. The album's first single, "Speed of Light", was issued as a music video on 14 August, and simultaneously as a digital download and CD single exclusive to Best Buy. In addition to being their longest studio record, it also contains the band's longest song to date, "Empire of the Clouds", at 18 minutes in length, which was also issued as a single for Record Store Day on 16 April 2016. While not a concept album, references to the soul and mortality are prominent, realised in the Maya-themed cover artwork, created by Mark Wilkinson.

A critical and commercial success, The Book of Souls topped the album charts in 24 countries. It earned the band their fifth (first consecutive) UK No. 1, following 1982's The Number of the Beast, 1988's Seventh Son of a Seventh Son, 1992's Fear of the Dark and 2010's The Final Frontier. In the US, it matched The Final Frontier's success on the Billboard 200, repeating the group's highest placement at No. 4 until it was surpassed by 2021's Senjutsu at No. 3. At the time of its release, The Book of Souls marked the longest gap between studio releases in the group's entire career; at five years, following The Final Frontier.

== Background ==
The band's intention to record a sixteenth studio album was first revealed by vocalist Bruce Dickinson in September 2013, who expected a possible release in 2015. The album was recorded at Guillaume Tell Studios, Paris with producer Kevin Shirley from September to December 2014, with the finishing touches added in early 2015. They had previously used the studios for 2000's Brave New World, with Dickinson stating "the studio holds special memories for all of us. We were delighted to discover the same magical vibe is still alive and very much kicking there!" The band originally intended to release the record earlier in 2015, but it was pushed back to 4 September while Dickinson received treatment for a cancerous tumour.

The album's title, artwork and track listing were revealed on 18 June 2015. Released by Parlophone, this is the band's first original studio album not to be issued by EMI, after both companies were acquired by Warner Music Group in 2013. In the US, the album was issued by Sanctuary Copyrights/BMG, following BMG's purchase of Sanctuary Records in 2013. On 14 August, the band issued a music video for the song "Speed of Light", directed by Llexi Leon. In addition, the song was simultaneously made available as a digital download and was issued as a single-track CD via Best Buy in the US.

The Book of Souls is the band's first album since 1995's The X Factor to use their original logotype (with the extended letters R, M and N) on the cover. The artwork was created by Mark Wilkinson, whose previous works for Iron Maiden include Live at Donington (1998 remastered version) and Best of the 'B' Sides (2002 compilation), as well as "The Wicker Man" and "Out of the Silent Planet" singles covers. According to bassist Steve Harris, the cover art ties in with the title track, as the depiction of the band's mascot, Eddie, is based on the Maya civilization, who "believe that souls live on [after death]". To check the accuracy of the artwork, the band hired Mayanist scholar Simon Martin, who also translated the song titles into hieroglyphs. According to Martin, although the civilisation had no Book of Souls, "the Mayans are very big on souls ... So as a title, it's appropriate to Mayan culture, but it's very much Iron Maiden's own thing." Although not a concept album, references to the soul appear throughout, as do ruminations on mortality in general, with Harris explaining "as you get older, you start thinking about your own mortality and these things more".

A supporting tour based on the album was delayed until early 2016 so that Dickinson could fully recuperate from his cancer treatment. The Book of Souls World Tour began in February with the band performing in 35 countries across North and South America, Asia, Australasia, Africa and Europe.

== Writing and recording ==
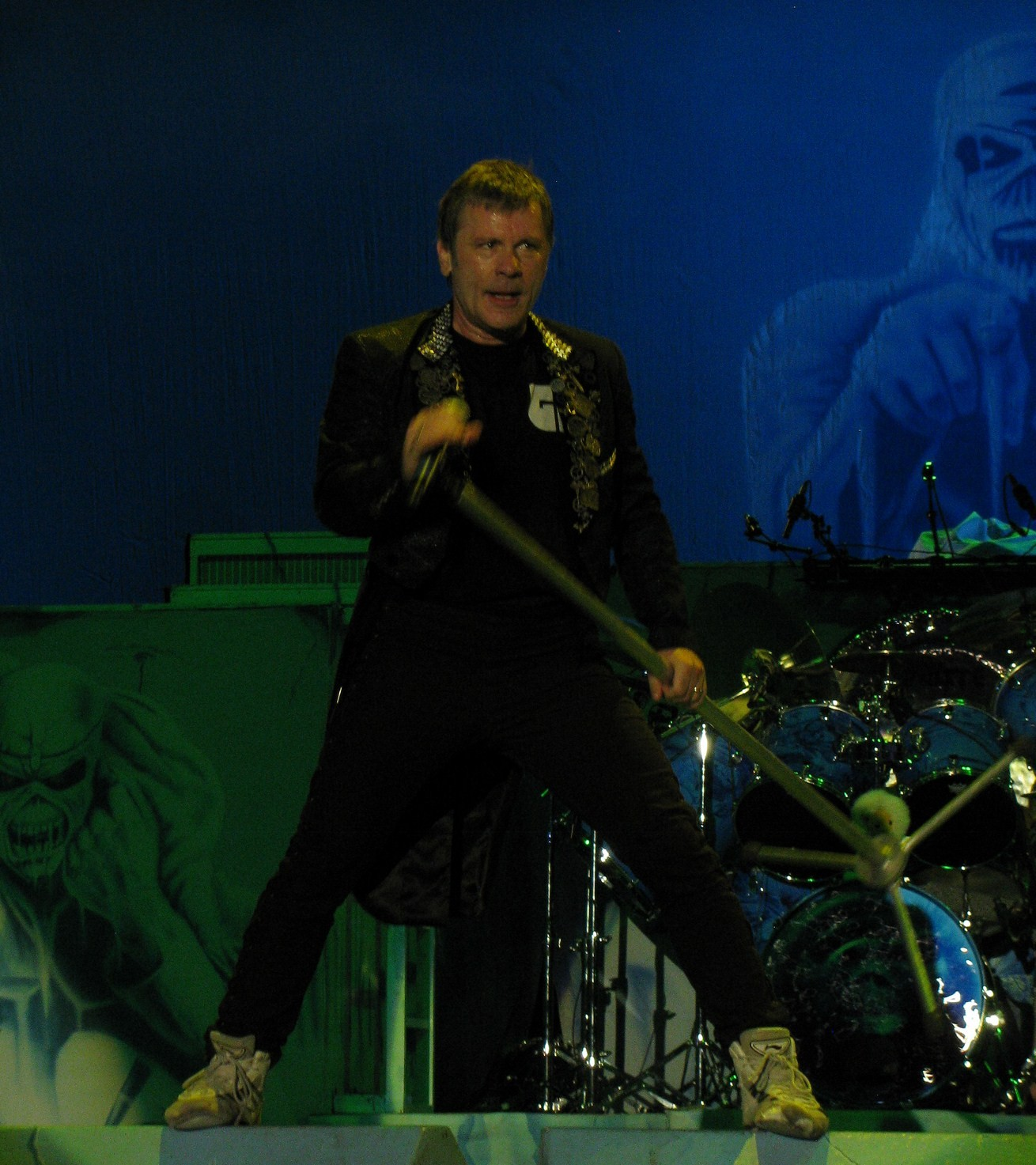
The album features two songs written solely by vocalist Bruce Dickinson.

Harris states that many of the songs were written and immediately recorded in the studio, adding to the record's "live feel". Guitarist Janick Gers explains that this involved abandoning their previous approach of spending several weeks writing and rehearsing, which meant that they "went into the studio with only outlines and finished writing the songs in the studio - so we were actually learning them, rehearsing them, and putting them down all at once". According to guitarist Adrian Smith, the pressure this created was positive "because it snaps you into action". Gers states that each member brought in approximately an hour of original music to the sessions, even though they "might only want to use 15 minutes of it", the result being "a really broad spectrum of musical ideas". As with all of their studio collaborations with Shirley, most of the album was recorded live with lots of first takes used for added spontaneity.

"Shadows of the Valley", "Death or Glory", "Speed of Light" and "If Eternity Should Fail" were the first songs written for the album, the last of which, according to Dickinson, was originally written for a potential solo album which he eventually reworked as The Mandrake Project, and features the band's first collective use of drop D tuning. Smith states that "Speed of Light" and "Death or Glory" were two of a small minority of tracks completed prior to the recording sessions, and mark the first collaboration between Smith and Dickinson (without Harris) since both members rejoined Iron Maiden in 1999. With both tracks, Smith and Dickinson deliberately wrote shorter songs in an attempt to hark back to previous singles "2 Minutes to Midnight" (1984) and "Can I Play with Madness" (1988). According to Dickinson, "Death or Glory" is about First World War triplanes.

Unlike the band's previous two albums, 2006's A Matter of Life and Death and 2010's The Final Frontier, Harris does not receive a writing credit for all of the record's songs. This is because Harris suffered two bereavements during the writing stage ("an old schoolfriend and a member of the family") which affected his creative output. The result was a more collaborative effort, with all members except drummer Nicko McBrain receiving a writing credit. One of Harris' contributions, "Tears of a Clown", which he co-wrote with Smith, is praised by Dickinson as his favourite track from The Book of Souls and is based on comedian Robin Williams' depression and suicide in 2014.

The release's final song, "Empire of the Clouds", replaces "Rime of the Ancient Mariner" (from 1984's Powerslave) as the band's longest song at 18 minutes in duration. The track features Dickinson on piano for the first time and is based on the 1930 R101 airship crash. According to Smith, Dickinson spent most of the album's recording sessions alone writing the song in a "soundproof glass box with his piano", which he completed with assistance from McBrain. Smith states that it was a challenge to record as Dickinson "laid down the piano on his own" and the band then "played along to that" while following Dickinson and Shirley's instructions. For Record Store Day 2016, "Empire of the Clouds" was issued as a single on 16 April. Along with opener "If Eternity Should Fail", it marks the first Iron Maiden album since Powerslave which features two tracks written solely by Dickinson. For the first time since 1998's Virtual XI, the final track wasn't written or co-written by Steve Harris. The Book of Souls is also the second album in Iron Maiden's history (following 1986's Somewhere in Time) in which Harris has not written or co-written any of its released singles.

At 92 minutes in length, it is both the longest Iron Maiden studio album and their first double studio record. Dickinson comments "we all agreed that each track was such an integral part of the whole body of work that if it needed to be a double album, then double it's going to be!"

== Artwork ==
Frequent collaborator Mark Wilkinson created the cover art, which depicts Eddie as a Mayan warrior. His first sketch had Eddie's usual wild hair reminiscent of a witch doctor, before manager Rod Smallwood asked to instead make him bald. The tribal markings are completely generic and made up, with Wilkinson describing them as "a mix of Voodoo meets Mayan". As reference, Wilkinson was given a book on Mayan culture by Harris and was also inspired by the film Apocalypto. Harris wanted simplicity for the cover, with only a bust shot of Eddie in the darkness to establish an evil presence. The inside artwork explored more of Mayan culture, like Eddie tearing out his own heart as a sacrifice to the gods next to a witch doctor, and a Valley of Death featuring totems with the faces of Iron Maiden's members carved onto them.

== Reception ==
=== Critical response ===
Professional ratings
Aggregate scores
Source	Rating
Metacritic	80/100
Review scores
Source	Rating
AllMusic	4/5 stars
Billboard	3.5/5 stars
Classic Rock	9/10
The Guardian	4/5 stars
Kerrang!	5/5
Metal Hammer	10/10
NME	8/10
Q	3/5 stars
Rolling Stone	3.5/5 stars
Uncut	7/10

At Metacritic, the album holds a score of 80 out of 100 based on 20 critics, indicating "generally favorable reviews". It was scored 9/10 by Classic Rock, who stated, "it's hard to think of another band of this vintage that would be capable of sounding this vital and inspired". Kerrang! and Metal Hammer gave it full marks: the former labelling it "an album of extraordinary vision"; the latter "a gargantuan emotional journey through some career-best performances that more than makes up for a five-year wait". Blabbermouth.net were also extremely positive, scoring it 9.5/10 and deeming it "Iron Maiden's most comprehensive and confident work since Brave New World and for certain one of their finest achievements overall". PopMatters awarded 9 stars out of 10, praising the band for returning to "the very top of their game in a way we haven't seen since 1988". AllMusic awarded it 4 out of five, stating, "With repeated listening it earns shelf space with their finest records." The Guardian also scored it 4 out of 5 and, despite criticising the "lumbering 'Shadows of the Valley'", exclaimed that "The Book of Souls is marked by an impressive rawness that scratches against the album's more grandiloquent moments".

Rolling Stone and Billboard were more critical, rating it 3.5 stars out of 5, the latter describing it as "outsized" but "surprisingly engaging overall". Paste rated it 7.9/10, saying "it's an impressive piece of work, but it gets bogged down by the band's own ambition", although still concluding that it is "the best Maiden record from Dickinson's second act, and an impressive achievement", while Uncut awarded it 7 out of 10, stating that "an epic, if somewhat ruminative tone dominates". Both Q and Record Collector gave the album a mixed score of 3 stars out of 5, the former criticising its "lengthy longueurs" and concluding that it is "not one of their best", while the latter asserted that "too much of the album is made up of endless midtempo guitar chug" and that it "sounds much like any other Maiden album from their career-twilight period".

The closing, 18-minute "Empire of the Clouds" was the subject of particular praise, with PopMatters calling it a "masterpiece" and "every bit as spellbinding as 1984's 'Rime of the Ancient Mariner' [from 1984's Powerslave]". AllMusic described it as "a heavy metal suite, unlike anything in their catalogue". Although Blabbermouth.net and NME did not agree that it matches "Rime of the Ancient Mariner", the former stated that it is "worth every single minute as a cinematic-sounding encapsulation of the band's career", while the latter called it "the pièce-de-résistance". It also received a positive response from Classic Rock, who deemed it a "stunning piece of work", while Billboard labelled it "a highlight". Sputnikmusic rated it "a significant improvement" on the closing tracks from the band's two previous studio records ("The Legacy" from 2006's A Matter of Life and Death and "When the Wild Wind Blows" from 2010's The Final Frontier), calling it "cerebral and evocative". The Guardian, however, argued that it is unlikely to appeal to enthusiasts of the band's older material, although they did say that "said [fans] might be mollified by Harris's 'The Red and the Black'". The Guardian complimented the 13-and-a-half-minute "The Red and the Black" for its "genuine urgency and agility", while PopMatters dubbed it "as predictable as [Harris's] songwriting gets, [but] this time around it's a delight to hear". In contrast, Paste were slightly critical of all three of the album's longer songs (also including the 10-minute title track), stating "in the end, the prog-jam logjam causes these songs to lose some of their impact, even after multiple listens", although they did commend "The Red and the Black" for having "the pace and feel of Powerslave's "Rime of the Ancient Mariner'".

=== Accolades ===
The Book of Souls received the Album of the Year award at the 2015 Classic Rock Roll of Honour Awards, collected the 2016 Metal Hammer Golden Gold Award for Best Album, and won in the Best International Album category at the 2016 Bandit Rock Awards. In addition, it was listed among the best albums of the year by some publications:

Year-end rankings

Publication	Accolade	Rank
Classic Rock	50 Best Albums of 2015	1
The Guardian	The Best Albums of 2015	39
Kerrang!	Albums of the Year 2015	2
Loudwire	20 Best Metal Albums of 2015	1
Loudwire	20 Best Metal Songs of 2015 (for "Empire of the Clouds")	1
Metal Hammer	2015: A Year In Metal - The Critics' Poll	1
Metal Hammer Germany	Die Soundcheck-Tops 2015	2
Rolling Stone	20 Best Metal Albums of 2015	5
Ultimate Classic Rock	Top 20 Albums of 2015	2

Decade-end rankings

Publication	Accolade	Rank
Discogs	The 200 Best Albums of the 2010s	62
Kerrang!	The 75 Best Albums of the 2010s	18
Louder Sound	The 50 Best Metal Albums of the 2010s	9
Loudwire	The 66 Best Metal Albums of the 2010s	7

=== Commercial performance ===
The album was a commercial success, reaching the no. 1 spot in 24 countries in addition to 19 other territories which no longer publish retail charts. It was their fifth record to top the UK albums chart with sales of over 60,000 units, out-selling their previous record, The Final Frontier, which sold 44,385 copies but reached the same chart position. In the US, the record charted at no. 4, their joint highest position on the Billboard 200 along with The Final Frontier up until that point; however, The Book of Souls was again the better seller, with 74,000 sales compared to 63,000. According to Billboard, this marks the band's best sales week in the US since the Nielsen SoundScan tracking system began operating in 1991. As of January 2016, The Book of Souls has sold more than 148,000 copies in the US.

== Track listing ==
Disc one
No.	Title	Writer(s)	Length
1.	"If Eternity Should Fail"	Bruce Dickinson	8:28
2.	"Speed of Light"	Adrian Smith; Dickinson	5:01
3.	"The Great Unknown"	Smith; Steve Harris	6:37
4.	"The Red and the Black"	Harris	13:33
5.	"When the River Runs Deep"	Smith; Harris	5:52
6.	"The Book of Souls"	Janick Gers; Harris	10:27
Total length:			49:58

Disc two
No.	Title	Writer(s)	Length
1.	"Death or Glory"	Smith; Dickinson	5:13
2.	"Shadows of the Valley"	Gers; Harris	7:32
3.	"Tears of a Clown"	Smith; Harris	4:59
4.	"The Man of Sorrows"	Dave Murray; Harris	6:28
5.	"Empire of the Clouds"	Dickinson	18:01
Total length:			42:13

== Personnel ==
Production and performance credits are adapted from the album liner notes.

=== Iron Maiden ===
- Bruce Dickinson – vocals, piano on "Empire of the Clouds"
- Dave Murray – guitars
- Adrian Smith – guitars
- Janick Gers – guitars
- Steve Harris – bass guitar, keyboards
- Nicko McBrain – drums, percussion on "Empire of the Clouds"

=== Additional musicians ===
- Michael Kenney – keyboards
- Jeff Bova – orchestration

=== Technical personnel ===
- Kevin Shirley – production, mixing
- Steve Harris – co-production
- Denis Caribaux – engineering
- Ade Emsley – mastering
- Chris Bellman – additional vinyl mastering
- Stuart Crouch – art direction, design
- Mark Wilkinson – cover illustration
- Anthony Dry – disc illustrations
- Julie Wilkinson – Maya codex drawings
- Simon Martin – Maya hieroglyphs
- Jorge Letona – Maya font design
- John McMurtrie – photography

== Charts ==
=== Weekly charts ===
Chart (2015)	Peak position
Argentinian Albums (CAPIF)	1
Australian Albums (ARIA)	2
Austrian Albums (Ö3 Austria)	1
Belgian Albums (Ultratop Flanders)	1
Belgian Albums (Ultratop Wallonia)	2
Brazilian Albums (ABPD)	1
Canadian Albums (Billboard)	2
Colombian Albums	1
Croatian International Albums (HDU)	1
Czech Albums (ČNS IFPI)	1
Danish Albums (Hitlisten)	3
Dutch Albums (Album Top 100)	1
Finnish Albums (Suomen virallinen lista)	1
French Albums (SNEP)	2
German Albums (Offizielle Top 100)	1
Greek Albums (IFPI)	1
Hungarian Albums (MAHASZ)	1
Irish Albums (IRMA)	2
Israeli Albums (Media Forest)	1
Italian Albums (FIMI)	1
Japanese Albums (Oricon)	6
South Korean Albums (Circle)	28
Mexican Albums (Top 100 Mexico)	1
New Zealand Albums (RMNZ)	2
Norwegian Albums (VG-lista)	1
Polish Albums (ZPAV)	1
Portuguese Albums (AFP)	1
Serbian Albums	1
Scottish Albums (Official Charts)	1
Slovenian Albums (SloTop30)	1
South African Albums (EMA)	4
Spanish Albums (PROMUSICAE)	1
Swedish Albums (Sverigetopplistan)	1
Swiss Albums (Schweizer Hitparade)	1
Turkish Albums (Turkish Music Charts)	3
UK Albums (Official Charts)	1
UK Rock & Metal Albums (Official Charts)	1
US Billboard 200	4
US Top Rock Albums (Billboard)	2

=== Year-end charts ===
Chart (2015)	Position
Australian Albums (ARIA)	69
Austrian Albums (Ö3 Austria)	43
Belgian Albums (Ultratop Flanders)	49
Belgian Albums (Ultratop Wallonia)	84
Canadian Albums (Billboard)	49
Croatian Foreign Albums (HDU)	1
Dutch Albums (MegaCharts)	49
Finnish Albums (Suomen virallinen lista)	2
French Albums (SNEP)	74
German Albums (Offizielle Top 100)	19
Hungarian Albums (MAHASZ)	13
Italian Albums (FIMI)	46
Mexican Albums (AMPROFON)	64
Spanish Albums (PROMUSICAE)	49
Swedish Albums (Sverigetopplistan)	32
Swiss Albums (Schweizer Hitparade)	17
UK Albums (OCC)	57
US Top Rock Albums (Billboard)	26

Chart (2016)	Position
Belgian Albums (Ultratop Flanders)	123

== Certifications ==
Region	Certification	Certified units/sales
Austria (IFPI Austria)	Gold	7,500^{*}
Brazil (Pro-Música Brasil)	Platinum	40,000^{*}
Canada (Music Canada)	Gold	40,000^{^}
Croatia (HDU)	Gold	3,000
Finland (Musiikkituottajat)	Gold	13,046
France (SNEP)	Gold	50,000^{*}
Germany (BVMI)	Gold	100,000^{‡}
Hungary (MAHASZ)	Platinum	2,000^{^}
Italy (FIMI)	Gold	25,000^{*}
Norway (IFPI Norway)	Gold	10,000^{‡}
Poland (ZPAV)	Gold	10,000^{‡}
Sweden (GLF)	Gold	20,000^{‡}
United Kingdom (BPI)	Gold	100,000^{‡}
^{*} Sales figures based on certification alone.^{^} Shipments figures based on certification alone.^{‡} Sales+streaming figures based on certification alone.
