= The Book of Souls: Live Chapter =

Live album and video by Iron Maiden
- Released: 17 November 2017
- Recorded: 16 March 2016 – 14 May 2017
- Venue: Various
- Genre: Heavy metal
- Length: 100:52
- Label: Parlophone; BMG
- Producer: Tony Newton

Iron Maiden chronology
The Book of Souls (2015)	The Book of Souls: Live Chapter (2017)	Nights of the Dead (2020)

Iron Maiden video chronology
Maiden England '88 (2013)	The Book of Souls: Live Chapter (2017)

The Book of Souls: Live Chapter is a live album and video by Iron Maiden, recorded throughout their 2016–2017 The Book of Souls World Tour. Released on 17 November 2017, the album was produced by Tony Newton, with Steve Harris serving as co-producer. This makes it the band's first live album since 2002's Beast over Hammersmith not to be produced by Kevin Shirley.

On 11 November, the video was livestreamed on YouTube. It is also available for digital purchase alongside its audio counterpart, although it was not released on physical media.

== Track listing ==
All tracks are written by Steve Harris, except where noted.

Disc one
No.	Title	Writer(s)	Venue	Length
1.	"If Eternity Should Fail" (6 May 2016)	Bruce Dickinson	Qudos Bank Arena – Sydney, Australia	7:46
2.	"Speed of Light" (18 May 2016)	Adrian Smith; Dickinson	Grand Arena – Cape Town, South Africa	5:08
3.	"Wrathchild" (6 May 2017)		3Arena – Dublin, Ireland	2:59
4.	"Children of the Damned" (1 April 2016)		Bell Centre – Montreal, Canada	5:14
5.	"Death or Glory" (3 July 2016)	Smith; Dickinson	Wrocław Stadium – Wrocław, Poland	5:15
6.	"The Red and the Black" (21 April 2016)		Ryogoku Kokugikan – Tokyo, Japan	13:17
7.	"The Trooper" (6 March 2016)		Estadio Jorge "Mágico" González – San Salvador, El Salvador	4:05
8.	"Powerslave" (26 July 2016)	Dickinson	Piazza Unità d'Italia – Trieste, Italy	7:31
Total length:				51:15

Disc two
No.	Title	Writer(s)	Venue	Length
1.	"The Great Unknown" (14 May 2017)	Smith; Harris	Metro Radio Arena – Newcastle, England	6:50
2.	"The Book of Souls" (12 June 2016)	Janick Gers; Harris	Donington Park – Leicestershire, England	10:49
3.	"Fear of the Dark" (24 March 2016)		Arena Castelão – Fortaleza, Brazil	7:34
4.	"Iron Maiden" (15 March 2016)		José Amalfitani Stadium – Buenos Aires, Argentina	6:05
5.	"The Number of the Beast" (4 August 2016)		Wacken Open Air – Wacken, Germany	5:06
6.	"Blood Brothers" (12 June 2016)		Donington Park – Leicestershire, England	7:35
7.	"Wasted Years" (17 March 2016)	Smith	HSBC Arena – Rio de Janeiro, Brazil	5:38
Total length:				49:37

== Personnel ==
=== Iron Maiden ===
- Bruce Dickinson – vocals
- Dave Murray – guitars
- Adrian Smith – guitars, backing vocals
- Janick Gers – guitars
- Steve Harris – bass, backing vocals
- Nicko McBrain – drums

==== Additional musicians ====
- Michael Kenney - keyboards

=== Technical personnel ===
- Tony Newton - recording, production, engineering, mixing
- Ade Emsley - mastering
- Hervé Monjeaud - illustrations
- Anthony Dry - illustrations
- Stuart Crouch - artwork
- John McMurtrie - photography
- Justin de Reuck - photography

== Charts ==
Chart (2017)	Peak position
Australian Albums (ARIA)	17
Austrian Albums (Ö3 Austria)	10
Belgian Albums (Ultratop Flanders)	21
Belgian Albums (Ultratop Wallonia)	32
Canadian Albums (Billboard)	44
Czech Albums (ČNS IFPI)	30
Dutch Albums (Album Top 100)	23
Finnish Albums (Suomen virallinen lista)	8
French Albums (SNEP)	40
German Albums (Offizielle Top 100)	5
Hungarian Albums (MAHASZ)	8
Irish Albums (IRMA)	46
Italian Albums (FIMI)	17
Norwegian Albums (VG-lista)	19
Polish Albums (ZPAV)	28
Portuguese Albums (AFP)	10
Scottish Albums (OCC)	12
Spanish Albums (Promusicae)	7
Swedish Albums (Sverigetopplistan)	8
Swiss Albums (Schweizer Hitparade)	5
UK Albums (OCC)	17
US Billboard 200	49
