= A Matter of Life and Death Tour =

2006–2007 concert tour by Iron Maiden

- Tour by Iron Maiden
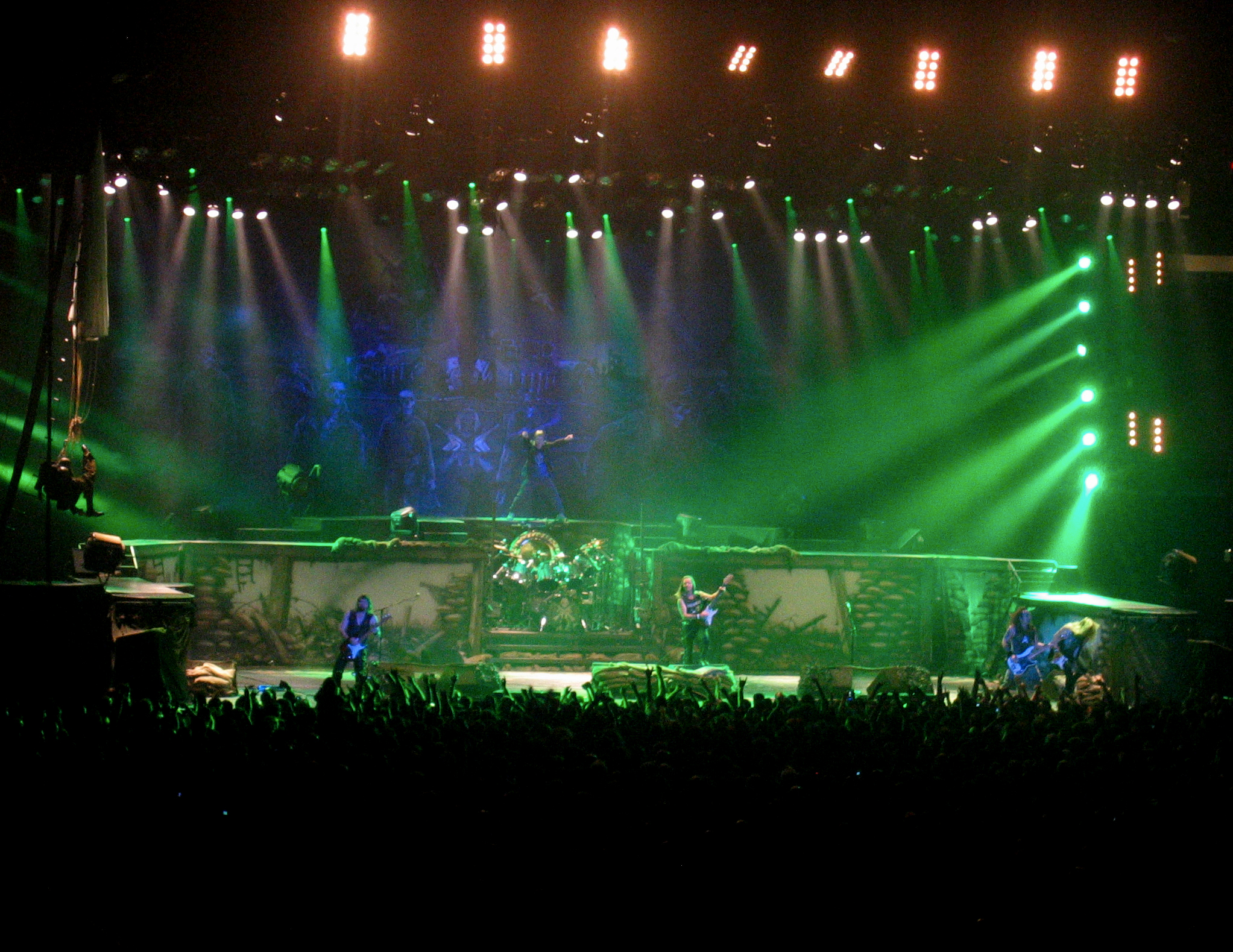
- Iron Maiden performing in Uniondale, New York on 12 October 2006
- Associated album: A Matter of Life and Death
- Start date: 4 October 2006
- End date: 24 June 2007
- No. of shows: 60

Iron Maiden concert chronology
- Eddie Rips Up the World Tour (2005); A Matter of Life and Death Tour (2006–2007); Somewhere Back in Time World Tour (2008–2009)

A Matter of Life and Death and A Matter of the Beast were two concert tours by the English heavy metal band Iron Maiden from 2006 to 2007. The first tour was unique, as the set list primarily consisted of the band's most recent release, A Matter of Life and Death, in its entirety, although this got a mixed response from audiences. Unusually, the first leg did not include "The Number of the Beast", a song which Iron Maiden had previously played on every tour since its inception. The second part of the tour, in celebration of The Number of the Beast's 25th anniversary, saw the band playing four songs from said album as well as five from A Matter of Life and Death (although they had initially planned to play five songs from both releases).

== Set ==
Throughout the tour, the stage would be decorated to look like a First World War trench, with the wall canvases featuring painted sandbags and barbed wire, the stage floor decorated with barbed wire and mud as well as actual sandbags placed in front of the monitors. The podiums at the end of each runway came with actual barbed wire and searchlights (operated by Dickinson) and the bodies of two parachutists would appear from the lighting rig during "The Longest Day" (during "Iron Maiden" in 2007). As with previous tours, Nicko McBrain's drumkit featured a Sooty puppet, this time dressed in army attire.

During "Iron Maiden," a tank would appear from the back of the set (the rear runway transforming into the tank's wheels), topped with a binocular-wielding Eddie with flashing LED lights. The walk-on Eddie would also appear as an armed soldier during "The Evil That Men Do."

== Opening acts ==
- Lauren Harris
- Trivium
- Bullet for My Valentine
- 3 Inches of Blood
- Motörhead
- Machine Head
- Parikrama
- In Flames
- Mastodon

== Setlist ==
A Matter of Life and Death World Tour 2006 Setlist
- Gustav Holst's "Mars, the Bringer of War" served as the intro for the tour.
1. "Different World" (from A Matter of Life and Death, 2006)
2. "These Colours Don't Run" (from A Matter of Life and Death, 2006)
3. "Brighter Than a Thousand Suns" (from A Matter of Life and Death, 2006)
4. "The Pilgrim" (from A Matter of Life and Death, 2006)
5. "The Longest Day" (from A Matter of Life and Death, 2006)
6. "Out of the Shadows" (from A Matter of Life and Death, 2006)
7. "The Reincarnation of Benjamin Breeg" (from A Matter of Life and Death, 2006)
8. "For the Greater Good of God" (from A Matter of Life and Death, 2006)
9. "Lord of Light" (from A Matter of Life and Death, 2006)
10. "The Legacy" (from A Matter of Life and Death, 2006)
11. "Fear of the Dark" (from Fear of the Dark, 1992)
12. "Iron Maiden" (from Iron Maiden, 1980)

Encore

1. "2 Minutes to Midnight" (from Powerslave, 1984)
2. "The Evil That Men Do" (from Seventh Son of a Seventh Son, 1988)
3. "Hallowed Be Thy Name" (from The Number of the Beast, 1982)

To celebrate the 25th anniversary of The Number of the Beast, the band announced that they would play five songs each from The Number of the Beast and A Matter of Life and Death throughout the 2007 part of the tour. However, only four songs from The Number of the Beast were actually played, which meant that "Children of the Damned" would be the only rarity in the setlist.

A Matter of the Beast Summer Tour 2007
- Gustav Holst's "Mars, the Bringer of War" served as the intro for the tour.
1. "Different World" (from A Matter of Life and Death, 2006)
2. "These Colours Don't Run" (from A Matter of Life and Death, 2006)
3. "Brighter Than a Thousand Suns" (from A Matter of Life and Death, 2006)
4. "Wrathchild" (from Killers, 1981)
5. "The Trooper" (from Piece of Mind, 1983)
6. "Children of the Damned" (from The Number of the Beast, 1982)
7. "The Reincarnation of Benjamin Breeg" (from A Matter of Life and Death, 2006)
8. "For the Greater Good of God" (from A Matter of Life and Death, 2006)
9. "The Number of the Beast" (from The Number of the Beast, 1982)
10. "Fear of the Dark" (from Fear of the Dark, 1992)
11. "Run to the Hills" (from The Number of the Beast, 1982)
12. "Iron Maiden" (from Iron Maiden, 1980)

Encore

1. "2 Minutes to Midnight" (from Powerslave, 1984)
2. "The Evil That Men Do" (from Seventh Son of a Seventh Son, 1988)
3. "Hallowed Be Thy Name" (from The Number of the Beast, 1982)

Notes:

- "Children of the Damned" was not played in Dubai, Athens, Belgrade and Bangalore.

== Tour dates ==
List of 2006 concerts
Date	City	Country	Venue
4 October 2006	Hartford	United States	New England Dodge Music Center
6 October 2006	Boston	United States	Agganis Arena
7 October 2006	Camden	United States	Tweeter Center at the Waterfront
9 October 2006	Quebec City	Canada	Colisée Pepsi
10 October 2006	Montreal	Canada	Bell Centre
12 October 2006	Uniondale	United States	Nassau Veterans Memorial Coliseum
13 October 2006	East Rutherford	United States	Continental Airlines Arena
16 October 2006	Toronto	Canada	Air Canada Centre
17 October 2006	Auburn Hills	United States	The Palace of Auburn Hills
18 October 2006	Rosemont	United States	Allstate Arena
21 October 2006	Irvine	United States	Verizon Wireless Amphitheatre
25 October 2006	Tokyo	Japan	Nippon Budokan
26 October 2006	Hiroshima	Japan	Yubinchokin Hall
28 October 2006	Tokyo	Japan	Kokusai Forum
30 October 2006	Osaka	Japan	Osaka-Castle Hall
31 October 2006	Nagoya	Japan	Shimin Hall
9 November 2006	Aalborg	Denmark	Gigantium
10 November 2006	Copenhagen	Denmark	Valby-Hallen
12 November 2006	Tampere	Finland	Icehall
14 November 2006	Helsinki	Finland	Hartwall Areena
15 November 2006	Helsinki	Finland	Hartwall Areena
17 November 2006	Stockholm	Sweden	Stockholm Globe Arena
18 November 2006	Stockholm	Sweden	Stockholm Globe Arena
20 November 2006	Gothenburg	Sweden	Scandinavium
21 November 2006	Oslo	Norway	Vallhall Arena
23 November 2006	Bergen	Norway	Vestlandshallen
25 November 2006	Stockholm	Sweden	Stockholm Globe Arena
27 November 2006	Den Bosch	Netherlands	Brabanthal
28 November 2006	Paris	France	Palais Omnisports de Paris-Bercy
30 November 2006	Barcelona	Spain	Palau Sant Jordi
2 December 2006	Milan	Italy	DatchForum
3 December 2006	Milan	Italy	DatchForum
5 December 2006	Zürich	Switzerland	Hallenstadion
7 December 2006	Stuttgart	Germany	Schleyerhalle
8 December 2006	Dortmund	Germany	Westfalenhalle
11 December 2006	Cardiff	Wales	CIA
12 December 2006	Birmingham	England	NEC
14 December 2006	Manchester	England	Manchester Evening News Arena
15 December 2006	Glasgow	Scotland	SECC
17 December 2006	Newcastle	England	Metro Radio Arena
18 December 2006	Sheffield	England	Hallam FM Arena
20 December 2006	Dublin	Ireland	The Point
22 December 2006	London	England	Earls Court Exhibition Centre
23 December 2006	London	England	Earls Court Exhibition Centre

List of 2007 concerts
Date	City	Country	Venue
9 March 2007	Dubai	United Arab Emirates	Desert Rock Festival
11 March 2007	Athens	Greece	Hellinikon Basketball Arena
14 March 2007	Belgrade	Serbia	Belgrade Fair Hall 1
17 March 2007	Bangalore	India	Eddfest, Bangalore Palace Grounds
2 June 2007	Ljubljana	Slovenia	Bežigrad Stadium
4 June 2007	Sofia	Bulgaria	Lokomotiv Stadium
6 June 2007	Ostrava	Czech Republic	Bazaly Stadium
8 June 2007	Ludwigshafen	Germany	Südweststadion
10 June 2007	Donington Park	England	Download Festival
14 June 2007	Venice	Italy	Heineken Jammin' Festival
16 June 2007	Biddinghuizen	Netherlands	Fields of Rock Festival
17 June 2007	Düsseldorf	Germany	ISS Dome
20 June 2007	Rome	Italy	Stadio Olimpico
21 June 2007	Bilbao	Spain	Bilbao BBK Live
23 June 2007	Dessel	Belgium	Graspop Metal Meeting
24 June 2007	London	England	Brixton Academy
