= Empire of the Clouds =

Single by Iron Maiden

from the album The Book of Souls
- B-side: "Maiden Voyage"
- Released: 16 April 2016
- Recorded: September–December 2014
- Studio: Guillaume Tell, Paris
- Genre: Heavy metal
- Length: 18:01
- Label: Parlophone
- Songwriter: Bruce Dickinson
- Producer: Kevin Shirley

Iron Maiden singles chronology
"Speed of Light" (2015)	"Empire of the Clouds" (2016)	"The Writing on the Wall" (2021)

"Empire of the Clouds" is a song by the English heavy metal band Iron Maiden from their sixteenth studio album, The Book of Souls. The song was issued as a single on 16 April 2016, tying in with Record Store Day.

== Background, writing, and recording ==
"Empire of the Clouds", at 18 minutes in length, is Iron Maiden's longest song to date, overtaking "Rime of the Ancient Mariner" from their 1984 album, Powerslave. The track tells the story of the British R101 airship, which crashed in northern France on 5 October 1930 during its maiden voyage. The song was written entirely by the band's lead vocalist, Bruce Dickinson, who initially intended it to be about "World War I fighter aeroplanes." Dickinson abandoned the idea after using the same theme for the song "Death or Glory," also from The Book of Souls. At the time of recording, Dickinson was reading "a big, sort of encyclopedic crash report" of the R101, entitled To Ride the Storm, which gave him the idea for the song's eventual subject. Dickinson describes it as "A very poignant story, a very human story, a story of ambition and dreams."

Dickinson largely composed "Empire of the Clouds" during The Book of Souls' recording sessions at Guillaume Tell Studios, Paris. According to one of the group's guitarists, Adrian Smith, Dickinson "was working on it for about a month on his own" in a sound-proof booth. The track features Dickinson's debut on piano (he had, apparently, won a keyboard in a raffle beforehand and started to learn to play), as he used the studio's Steinway grand piano to write the song, although he used a keyboard on the actual recording, thereby making it easier to edit out his mistakes.

According to Smith, the song was a challenge for the rest of the band as they had to play along to Dickinson's piano track while following his and producer Kevin Shirley's instructions. In addition to the band's parts, additional orchestration was added to the song afterwards, while Nicko McBrain experimented with a variety of percussive instruments, including a bowed gong, to recreate the airship's crash.

On 11 March 2016, the band announced that the song would be released as a 12" picture disc single for Record Store Day limited to 5,500 copies, using the front cover of the Daily Mirror from 6 October 1930 as the cover artwork. The single's B-side features an interview with Dickinson and McBrain, entitled "Maiden Voyage", in which they recount the song's creation.

== Reception ==
The song received critical acclaim. PopMatters called it a "masterpiece" and "every bit as spellbinding as 1984’s 'Rime of the Ancient Mariner'", while AllMusic described it as "a heavy metal suite, unlike anything in their catalogue". While Blabbermouth.net and NME did not agree that it matches "Rime of the Ancient Mariner", the former stated that it is "worth every single minute as a cinematic-sounding encapsulation of the band's career", and the latter called it "the pièce-de-résistance". It also received a positive response from Classic Rock, who deemed it "stunning piece of work", while Billboard labelled it "a highlight". Sputnikmusic rated it "a significant improvement" on the closing tracks from the band's two previous studio records ("The Legacy" from 2006's A Matter of Life and Death and "When the Wild Wind Blows" from 2010's The Final Frontier), calling it "cerebral and evocative". The Guardian, however, argued that it is unlikely to appeal to enthusiasts of the band's older material, although they did say that "said [fans] might be mollified by Harris’s 'The Red and the Black'".

== Track listing ==
No.	Title	Writer(s)	Length
1.	"Empire of the Clouds"	Bruce Dickinson	18:01
2.	"Maiden Voyage – The Story Behind Empire of the Clouds"	Dickinson; Nicko McBrain	21:07

== Personnel ==
Production credits are adapted from the picture disc cover.

Iron Maiden

- Bruce Dickinson – vocals, piano
- Dave Murray – guitars
- Adrian Smith – guitars
- Janick Gers – guitars
- Steve Harris – bass, co-producer
- Nicko McBrain – drums, percussion

Additional personnel

- Jeff Bova – orchestration

Production

- Kevin Shirley – producer, mixing
- Ade Emsley – mastering
- Paul Anthony – producer, mixing ("Maiden Voyage")
- Tony Newton – mastering ("Maiden Voyage")
- Hervé Monjeaud – cover illustration
