= The Book of Souls World Tour =

2016–2017 concert tour by Iron Maiden

- Tour by Iron Maiden
- Official tour poster
- Location: Africa; Asia; Europe; North America; Oceania; South America
- Associated album: The Book of Souls
- Start date: 24 February 2016
- End date: 22 July 2017
- No. of shows: 117
- Box office: US$106,000,000 (from 104 shows)

Iron Maiden concert chronology
- Maiden England World Tour (2012–2014); The Book of Souls World Tour (2016–2017); Legacy of the Beast World Tour (2018–2022)

The Book of Souls World Tour was a concert tour by the English heavy metal band Iron Maiden, held in support of their sixteenth studio album, The Book of Souls. During the first leg of the tour the band played shows in 36 countries across six continents, which included their debut performances in El Salvador, Lithuania and China. With 117 shows, it was the longest tour with Bruce Dickinson on vocals since the "Somewhere on Tour" in 1986–87. The group, their crew and equipment were transported on a customized Boeing 747-400, nicknamed "Ed Force One", which was piloted by vocalist Bruce Dickinson (the first time using the Boeing 747, replaced Boeing 757, which they used on some of their previous tours). The success of the tour led to the live album / video The Book of Souls: Live Chapter, released in 2017.

== Background ==
Iron Maiden's intention to tour in support of The Book of Souls was confirmed with the album's announcement on 18 June 2015. The band's touring plans had to be delayed until 2016 to allow vocalist Bruce Dickinson to recover following treatment for a cancerous tumour found on his tongue. The tour was officially announced with a press release on 25 August, which included a general outline of the band's itinerary with specific dates to be confirmed. Starting in February, the band visited 36 countries throughout North and South America, Japan, China, New Zealand, Australia and South Africa, before finishing in Europe in August. The band's dates in China, El Salvador and Lithuania marked their debut visits to those countries, while their South African shows were their first with Dickinson as vocalist (having previously toured there in 1995).

The first dates to be confirmed were the band's shows in New Zealand, Australia and South Africa, announced 14 September 2015. On 1 October, the group released their US itinerary, which highlighted their Fort Lauderdale performance as the tour's opening concert, with an additional night in Los Angeles added on 13 October. This was followed by their Central and South American dates on 5 and 6 October, which included the announcement of their first ever performance in El Salvador, their Canadian performances on 8 October and an additional show in Mexico City on 26 October. On 12 January 2016, the band announced their debut performances in China in Beijing and Shanghai, followed by the confirmation of their return to Japan, after an eight-year absence, with two nights in Tokyo. The band's debut in El Salvador was reportedly the largest event in the history of the country, with an attendance of 25,000, and the group received a special thanks from the Ministry of Tourism.

The band began announcing their European shows from 7 October 2015, with their Netherlands date the first to be revealed, followed by Ullevi, Sweden on 19 October, Oslo, Norway and Herning, Denmark on 21 October, Berlin, Germany on 23 October, Wrocław, Poland on 26 October. Kaunas, their debut appearance in Lithuania, and Hämeenlinna, Finland on 2 November, Moscow, Russia on 3 November, Prague, Czech Republic on 11 November, Italy on 30 November, Madrid, Spain on 9 December, Luxembourg on 22 January 2016, Slovakia on 10 February, Croatia on 12 February and Seville, Spain on 15 February. The band played several festivals throughout their European tour, including Graspop Metal Meeting in Belgium, Rock im Revier, Rockavaria and Wacken Open Air in Germany, the Download Festival in Paris, France and Donington, UK, Rock in Vienna, Austria, Sonisphere presents Allment Rockt in Lucerne, Switzerland, VOLT Festival in Sopron, Hungary, Rock in Roma Sonisphere in Italy, Resurrection Fest and Rock Fest in Spain, Rock the City in Bucharest, Romania and Paléo Festival in Nyon, Switzerland.

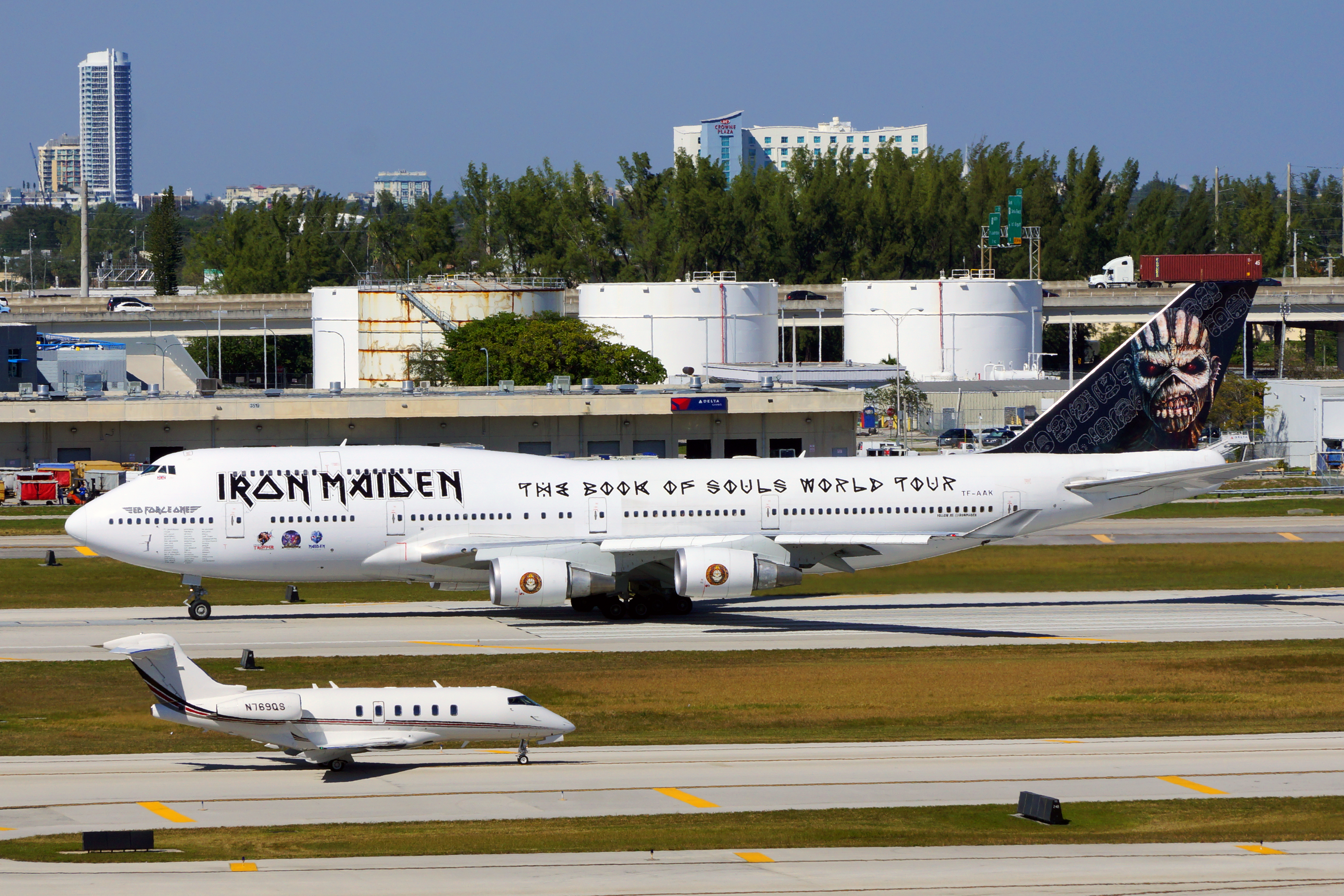
The band departing Fort Lauderdale in their chartered Air Atlanta Icelandic Boeing 747-400, their transport for the majority of the tour.

As with their 2008 and 2011 tours, the band travelled on their own aircraft, nicknamed "Ed Force One" after the band's mascot, Eddie, although this time using a Boeing 747-400 jumbo jet, provided by Air Atlanta Icelandic, rather than the smaller Boeing 757s which they had previously used. According to Dickinson, a qualified pilot who captained the aeroplane, the larger 747-400 meant that the band were able to travel at faster speeds and for longer periods and were able to carry their equipment without the plane having to undertake extensive modifications, as they had to do with the 757s. Ed Force One carried the band, their crew and over 12 tons of equipment for all of their shows up to and including their concert in Gothenburg, Sweden on 17 June. On 12 March, the plane was involved in a collision with a tow truck on the ground at Arturo Merino Benítez International Airport in Santiago, Chile, while being towed for refuelling, injuring two ground tug operators as well as damaging the aircraft's undercarriage and two of its engines. The band made contingency plans to ensure that their schedule was unaffected as the repairs were carried out, which Dickinson stated would take two weeks. On 21 March, the band reported that the repairs had been completed and that Ed Force One would rejoin the group for the remainder of the tour.

In September 2016, the band announced that the tour would continue with European shows in 2017, encompassing Belgium, Germany, the UK and Ireland. In January 2017, the band added a series of North American performances, taking place in June and July 2017. On 17 February, an additional night in New York was added, confirmed as the final concert of the tour. By the tour's conclusion, the band performed 117 shows in 36 countries.

== Set ==
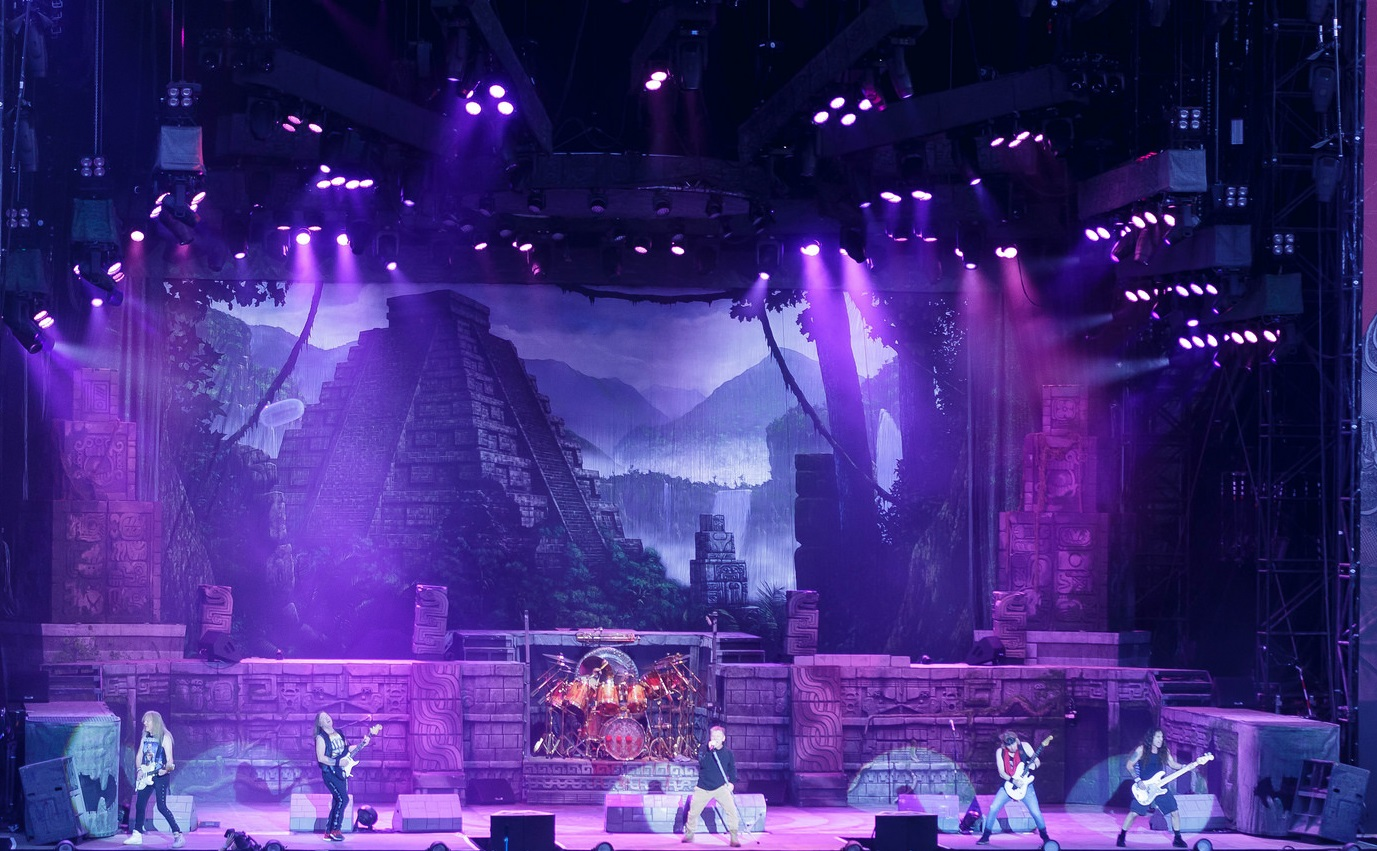
Iron Maiden performing in Nyon, Switzerland, 20 July 2016

Tying in with the album's title and theme, the stage set was decorated in a manner which mimics Maya architecture. The band's mascot, Eddie, in his Mayan guise from The Book of Souls album cover, appeared at two points during the show: as a walking puppet during "The Book of Souls" and as an inflatable head during "Iron Maiden". In addition, an inflatable goat/devil appeared during "The Number of the Beast".

== Reception ==
=== Critical response ===
The tour received positive reviews from critics, with Loudwire stating that Iron Maiden "[show] no sign of age in the slightest and [continue] to demonstrate why they're top live act in heavy metal", while Revolver concluded that their opening performance in Florida was "another memorable performance from the musical giants. Classic heavy metal. Classic Maiden." The band member's individual performances were well-received, with the BrooklynVegan reporting that the band brought "a level of energy and athleticism that you wouldn't think a 40-year-old band could still be capable of", Following his recovery from cancer, particular attention was given to vocalist Bruce Dickinson, with SouthFlorida.com stating that it was "a tour de force for Dickinson", while Loudwire reported that "[his] golden pipes are very much in tact (sic)" and Tulsa World exclaimed that "his interaction with the band members and the crowd makes for some dynamic entertainment". In addition to their vocalist, the other band members received specific praise, with Tulsa World referring to bassist Steve Harris' "sophisticated skills", while SouthFlorida.com commented that "guitarists Adrian Smith, Dave Murray and Janick Gers brought all the necessary firepower to the night."

The tour's stage show was also praised, with Tulsa World describing it as "a beautiful piece of craftsmanship". Revolver deemed the stage show "as impressive as they've ever had with a jungle vibe complete with hanging ropes from the ceiling and fiery tiki torches lit in the background", while The BrooklynVegan stated that it was a "staggering and immersive set design with gorgeous artistry and other gloomy bells and whistles". New Times Broward-Palm Beach highlighted appearances from the band's mascot, Eddie, as well as a horned devil during "The Number of the Beast", as "incredible to see and impressive pieces of this tour's set", while Las Vegas Weekly argued that "the show successfully walked the line between darkness and cheesiness, just as Maiden has been doing for the past four decades."

=== Commercial performance ===
The Book of Souls World Tour was ranked at no. 8 in Billboard's 2016 mid-year touring update, with a gross of US$35,055,268 from 34 shows. Pollstar ranked it at no. 13 in their mid-year list of worldwide tours, with a reported $46.4 million gross from 46 concerts. In addition, Pollstar also ranked it at no. 32 in their 2016 mid-year list of North American tours, taking $15.4 million from 17 performances.

In their 2016 Year End list of the Top Worldwide Tours, Pollstar ranked The Book of Souls World Tour at no. 19 with a gross of US$62.9 million based on 59 shows, while their list of North American tours placed the band at no. 80 with a gross of $15.3 million based on 17 shows.

In Pollstar's 2017 Mid-Year list of the Top Worldwide Tours, the tour was ranked no. 29 with a gross of US$27.9 million from 33 shows. At the end of 2017, the tour placed at number 56 on Pollstar's "2017 Year-End Top 100 Worldwide Tours" list, grossing $37.3 million with a total attendance of 553,067 people on 45 shows.

== Opening acts ==
=== 2016 ===
- The Raven Age - Throughout the tour
- Anthrax - Mexico, El Salvador, Costa Rica, Chile, Argentina, Brazil, Poland and Italy
- Araña - El Salvador
- Ghost - Berlin, Norway and Denmark
- Opeth - Sweden
- Sabaton - Finland, Slovakia and Italy
- Stratovarius - Finland
- Amon Amarth - Finland

=== 2017 ===
- Shinedown - All dates across Europe
- Ghost - All dates across North America
- Exodus - San Bernardino
- Kamelot - San Bernardino

== Set list ==
Speaking about the set list prior to the tour, guitarist Janick Gers stated that the band would play "six or seven" tracks from The Book of Souls and "pepper it with older songs so everybody gets to enjoy the gig." Gers also suggested that "Hallowed Be Thy Name" (from The Number of the Beast, 1982) would return to the show, following its absence during the Maiden England World Tour 2012–14, and that "The Trooper" (from Piece of Mind, 1983) would also be performed. In an additional interview, Bruce Dickinson revealed that either "Run to the Hills" or The Number of the Beast" (both concert staples from The Number of the Beast) would be excluded.

The following set list was performed in Sunrise, Florida, and is not intended to be representative of the majority of the shows on the tour.

1. "If Eternity Should Fail"
2. "Speed of Light"
3. "Children of the Damned"
4. "Tears of a Clown"
5. "The Red and the Black"
6. "The Trooper"
7. "Powerslave"
8. "Death or Glory"
9. "The Book of Souls"
10. "Hallowed Be Thy Name"
11. "Fear of the Dark"
12. "Iron Maiden"
  Encore
13. "The Number of the Beast"
14. "Blood Brothers"
15. "Wasted Years"

=== Notes ===
- "Powerslave" and "Children of the Damned" returned to the band's set list having last been played in 2009.
- Set list regular "Hallowed Be Thy Name" also returned after its notable absence during the Maiden England World Tour 2012–14, although it was again dropped on the second leg of the tour.
- This is the first time that "Blood Brothers" and "Wasted Years" have been played as encores, while it is the first time that the latter has been used as a closing song.

== Tour dates ==
List of 2016 concerts
Date	City	Country	Venue	Attendance	Revenue
24 February 2016	Sunrise	United States	BB&T Center	12,478 / 12,478	$954,111
26 February 2016	Tulsa	United States	BOK Center	11,421 / 11,421	$702,218
28 February 2016	Las Vegas	United States	Mandalay Bay Events Center	9,000 / 9,000	$862,872
1 March 2016	Monterrey	Mexico	Auditorio Banamex	7,944 / 7,944	$608,921
3 March 2016	Mexico City	Mexico	Palacio de los Deportes	39,059 / 39,059	$1,952,233
4 March 2016	Mexico City	Mexico	Palacio de los Deportes	39,059 / 39,059	$1,952,233
6 March 2016	San Salvador	El Salvador	Estadio Jorge "Mágico" González	22,041 / 22,041	$1,331,925
8 March 2016	San José	Costa Rica	Estadio Ricardo Saprissa	16,655 / 18,000	$996,194
11 March 2016	Santiago	Chile	Estadio Nacional	54,911 / 56,674	$2,181,940
13 March 2016	Córdoba	Argentina	Estadio Mario Kempes	17,680 / 18,600	$857,309
15 March 2016	Buenos Aires	Argentina	Estadio Veléz Sarsfield	32,629 / 32,629	$1,558,520
17 March 2016	Rio de Janeiro	Brazil	HSBC Arena	12,219 / 12,219	$844,709
19 March 2016	Belo Horizonte	Brazil	Esplanada do Mineirão	16,844 / 16,844	$1,165,280
22 March 2016	Brasília	Brazil	Nilson Nelson Gymnasium	10,942 / 11,380	$631,263
24 March 2016	Fortaleza	Brazil	Estádio Castelão	23,531 / 23,531	$1,449,220
26 March 2016	São Paulo	Brazil	Allianz Parque	39,583 / 39,583	$2,844,250
30 March 2016	New York City	United States	Madison Square Garden	13,289 / 13,289	$1,472,331
1 April 2016	Montreal	Canada	Bell Centre	14,963 / 14,963	$866,918
3 April 2016	Toronto	Canada	Air Canada Centre	13,734 / 13,734	$889,288
5 April 2016	Auburn Hills	United States	The Palace of Auburn Hills	10,232 / 10,900	$750,508
6 April 2016	Chicago	United States	United Center	13,968 / 13,968	$1,085,976
8 April 2016	Edmonton	Canada	Rexall Place	12,813 / 12,813	$842,035
10 April 2016	Vancouver	Canada	Rogers Arena	12,478 / 13,405	$794,762
11 April 2016	Tacoma	United States	Tacoma Dome	15,106 / 15,333	$843,417
13 April 2016	Denver	United States	Pepsi Center	11,943 / 12,411	$836,499
15 April 2016	Inglewood	United States	The Forum	24,886 / 24,886	$2,218,068
16 April 2016	Inglewood	United States	The Forum	24,886 / 24,886	$2,218,068
20 April 2016	Tokyo	Japan	Ryōgoku Kokugikan	—	—
21 April 2016	Tokyo	Japan	Ryōgoku Kokugikan	—	—
24 April 2016	Beijing	China	LeSports Center	—	—
26 April 2016	Shanghai	China	Mercedes-Benz Arena	—	—
29 April 2016	Christchurch	New Zealand	Horncastle Arena	6,380 / 8,545	$460,673
1 May 2016	Auckland	New Zealand	Vector Arena	9,966 / 9,966	$772,536
4 May 2016	Brisbane	Australia	Brisbane Entertainment Centre	8,473 / 10,412	$678,128
6 May 2016	Sydney	Australia	Qudos Bank Arena	13,476 / 13,476	$1,159,760
9 May 2016	Melbourne	Australia	Rod Laver Arena	12,861 / 12,861	$1,100,540
12 May 2016	Adelaide	Australia	Adelaide Entertainment Centre	7,569 / 7,708	$565,887
14 May 2016	Perth	Australia	Perth Arena	8,785 / 9,341	$652,748
18 May 2016	Cape Town	South Africa	Grand Arena	—	—
21 May 2016	Johannesburg	South Africa	Carnival City Festival Lawns	—	—
27 May 2016 (Note: This concert was a part of "Rock im Revier".)	Dortmund	Germany	Westfalenhallen	—N/a	—N/a
29 May 2016 (Note: This concert was a part of "Rockavaria".)	Munich	Germany	Olympiapark	—N/a	—N/a
31 May 2016	Berlin	Germany	Waldbühne	20,274 / 20,274	$1,602,645
3 June 2016 (Note: This concert was a part of "Sonisphere presents Allmend Rockt".)	Lucerne	Switzerland	Allmend Luzern	—N/a	—N/a
5 June 2016 (Note: This concert was a part of "Rock in Vienna".)	Vienna	Austria	Donauinsel	—N/a	—N/a
8 June 2016	Arnhem	Netherlands	GelreDome	21,439 / 22,500	$1,683,988
10 June 2016 (Note: This concert was a part of "Download Festival".)	Paris	France	Longchamp Racecourse	—N/a	—N/a
12 June 2016 (Note: This concert was a part of "Download Festival".)	Castle Donington	England	Donington Park	—N/a	—N/a
15 June 2016	Oslo	Norway	Telenor Arena	18,635 / 18,635	$1,416,976
17 June 2016	Gothenburg	Sweden	Ullevi	54,057 / 55,000	$4,194,211
19 June 2016 (Note: This concert was a part of "Graspop Metal Meeting".)	Dessel	Belgium	Festivalpark Stenehei	—N/a	—N/a
21 June 2016	Herning	Denmark	Jyske Bank Boxen	11,425 / 12,000	$1,019,737
23 June 2016	Kaunas	Lithuania	Žalgiris Arena	—	—
25 June 2016	Moscow	Russia	Olympic Stadium	—	—
29 June 2016	Hämeenlinna	Finland	Kantola Event Park	19,599 / 20,000	$1,703,153
1 July 2016 (Note: This concert was a part of "VOLT Festival".)	Sopron	Hungary	Lővér Camping Site	—N/a	—N/a
3 July 2016	Wrocław	Poland	Wrocław Stadium	35,081 / 37,000	$1,936,579
5 July 2016	Prague	Czech Republic	Eden Arena	26,993 / 30,000	$1,588,774
6 July 2016	Žilina	Slovakia	Žilina Airport	—	—
9 July 2016 (Note: This concert was a part of "Resurrection Fest".)	Viveiro	Spain	Main Stage Area	—N/a	—N/a
11 July 2016	Lisbon	Portugal	MEO Arena	17,530 / 17,530	$910,059
13 July 2016	Madrid	Spain	Barclaycard Center	14,752 / 14,752	$1,121,029
14 July 2016	Seville	Spain	Estadio de La Cartuja	—	—
16 July 2016 (Note: This concert was a part of "Barcelona Rock Fest".)	Santa Coloma de Gramenet	Spain	Parc de Can Zam	—N/a	—N/a
20 July 2016 (Note: This concert was a part of "Paléo Festival".)	Nyon	Switzerland	Plaine de L'Asse	—N/a	—N/a
22 July 2016	Milan	Italy	Mediolanum Forum	11,264 / 11,264	$810,798
24 July 2016 (Note: This concert was a part of "Rock in Roma Sonisphere".)	Rome	Italy	Capannelle Racecourse	—N/a	—N/a
26 July 2016	Trieste	Italy	Piazza Unità d'Italia	12,350 / 13,000	$912,790
27 July 2016	Split	Croatia	Spaladium Arena	—	—
30 July 2016 (Note: This concert was a part of "Rock the City".)	Bucharest	Romania	Piața Constituției	14,759 / 21,000	$665,863
2 August 2016	Esch-sur-Alzette	Luxembourg	Rockhal	—	—
4 August 2016 (Note: This concert was a part of "Wacken Open Air".)	Wacken	Germany	True Metal Stage	—N/a	—N/a

List of 2017 concerts
Date	City	Country	Venue	Attendance	Revenue
22 April 2017	Antwerp	Belgium	Sportpaleis	19,844 / 19,844	$1,323,671
24 April 2017	Oberhausen	Germany	König Pilsener Arena	18,880 / 21,072	$1,464,082
25 April 2017	Oberhausen	Germany	König Pilsener Arena	18,880 / 21,072	$1,464,082
28 April 2017	Frankfurt	Germany	Festhalle Frankfurt	23,320 / 23,320	$1,758,589
29 April 2017	Frankfurt	Germany	Festhalle Frankfurt	23,320 / 23,320	$1,758,589
2 May 2017	Hamburg	Germany	Barclaycard Arena	11,380 / 11,380	$877,694
4 May 2017	Nottingham	England	Motorpoint Arena Nottingham	8,439 / 8,439	$597,855
6 May 2017	Dublin	Ireland	3Arena	13,000 / 13,000	$971,056
8 May 2017	Manchester	England	Manchester Arena	13,687 / 14,898	$978,077
10 May 2017	Sheffield	England	Sheffield Arena	9,043 / 10,566	$639,499
11 May 2017	Leeds	England	First Direct Arena	10,273 / 12,345	$726,101
14 May 2017	Newcastle	England	Metro Radio Arena	10,211 / 10,211	$719,483
16 May 2017	Glasgow	Scotland	The SSE Hydro	12,213 / 12,369	$865,665
17 May 2017	Aberdeen	Scotland	GE Oil and Gas Arena	—	—
20 May 2017	Liverpool	England	Echo Arena	10,447 / 10,447	$734,323
21 May 2017	Birmingham	England	Barclaycard Arena	14,821 / 14,821	$1,052,078
24 May 2017	Cardiff	Wales	Motorpoint Arena Cardiff	—	—
27 May 2017	London	England	The O_{2} Arena	34,427 / 34,427	$2,399,119
28 May 2017	London	England	The O_{2} Arena	34,427 / 34,427	$2,399,119
3 June 2017	Bristow	United States	Jiffy Lube Live	17,610 / 22,600	$1,022,485
4 June 2017	Philadelphia	United States	Wells Fargo Center	13,895 / 13,895	$1,193,673
7 June 2017	Newark	United States	Prudential Center	11,450 / 11,450	$964,148
9 June 2017	Charlotte	United States	PNC Music Pavilion	15,548 / 18,331	$721,422
11 June 2017	Tampa	United States	Amalie Arena	12,781 / 12,781	$988,221
13 June 2017	Nashville	United States	Bridgestone Arena	10,909 / 13,992	$763,209
15 June 2017	Tinley Park	United States	Hollywood Casino Amphitheatre	14,015 / 27,853	$706,186
16 June 2017	Saint Paul	United States	Xcel Energy Center	14,494 / 15,825	$1,148,500
19 June 2017	Oklahoma City	United States	Chesapeake Energy Arena	5,307 / 12,862	$357,567
21 June 2017	Houston	United States	Toyota Center	9,939 / 11,433	$825,670
23 June 2017	Dallas	United States	American Airlines Center	11,685 / 12,406	$871,044
24 June 2017	San Antonio	United States	AT&T Center	13,419 / 13,742	$904,778
27 June 2017	Albuquerque	United States	Isleta Amphitheater	13,862 / 15,387	$538,261
28 June 2017	Phoenix	United States	Talking Stick Resort Arena	10,475 / 11,500	$838,216
1 July 2017	San Bernardino	United States	San Manuel Amphitheater	23,363 / 40,000	$1,366,789
3 July 2017	Las Vegas	United States	T-Mobile Arena	9,033 / 10,500	$759,014
5 July 2017	Oakland	United States	Oracle Arena	13,413 / 13,413	$1,057,284
7 July 2017	Salt Lake City	United States	USANA Amphitheatre	13,413 / 13,413	$1,057,284
9 July 2017	Lincoln	United States	Pinnacle Bank Arena	7,856 / 10,000	$622,402
11 July 2017	Kansas City	United States	Sprint Center	7,012 / 8,915	$528,810
12 July 2017	St. Louis	United States	Hollywood Casino Amphitheatre	—	—
15 July 2017	Toronto	Canada	Budweiser Stage	15,671 / 15,671	$789,569
16 July 2017	Quebec City	Canada	Videotron Centre	13,680 / 13,680	$856,985
19 July 2017	Mansfield	United States	Xfinity Center	19,038 / 19,038	$873,512
21 July 2017	Brooklyn	United States	Barclays Center	23,438 / 23,438	$2,030,058
22 July 2017	Brooklyn	United States	Barclays Center	23,438 / 23,438	$2,030,058
Total				1,347,960 / 1,446,667 (93.2%)	$91,061,452

== Personnel ==
(Credits taken from the official tour programme.)

Iron Maiden

- Bruce Dickinson – vocals
- Dave Murray – guitars
- Janick Gers – guitars
- Adrian Smith – guitars, backing vocals
- Steve Harris – bass, backing vocals
- Nicko McBrain – drums

Management

- Rod Smallwood
- Andy Taylor

Booking agents

- Rick Roskin at CAA (North America)
- John Jackson at K2 Agency Ltd. (rest of the world)
- Dave Shack

Intro tape production

- Llexi Leon – director
- Yaya Leone – producer
- Joe Plant – lead animation

Crew

- Dick Bell – production consultant
- Ian Day – tour director
- John Collins – tour manager
- Nick Farrington – tour manager
- Patrick Ledwith – production manager
- Zeb Minto – production coordinator
- Kerry Harris – production assistant
- Rik Benbow – stage manager
- Martin Walker – sound engineer
- Rob Coleman – lighting designer
- Antti Saari – lighting engineer
- Michael Mule – monitor engineer
- Steve Smith – Steve Harris' monitor engineer
- Jonathan Beswick – video director
- Ryan Titley – audiovisual director
- Jeff Weir – head of security
- Peter Lokrantz – security
- Natasha De Sampayo – wardrobe
- Michael Kenney – Steve Harris' guitar technician and keyboards
- Sean Brady – Adrian Smith's guitar technician
- Colin Price – Dave Murray's guitar technician
- Eddie Marsh – Janick Gers' guitar technician
- Charlie Charlesworth – Nicko McBrain's drum technician
- Ian Walsh – sound technician (2016)
- Phil Shenton – sound technician (2017)
- Omar Franchi – rigger (2016)
- Steve Armstrong – head rigger (2017)
- Ashley Groom – set carpenter
- Philip Stewart – set carpenter
- Eoin McBrien – set carpenter
- Jude Aflalo – set carpenter
- Richard Trow – line array engineer (2016)
- Mike Hackman – audio system technician (2017)
- Adam Ford – animatronics technician
- Ian Evans – merchandiser
- Keith Maxwell – pyrotechnics
- Eric Muccio – pyrotechnics
- Jeremy Smith – freight director (2016)
- Colette Shryane-Smith – head caterer / catering coordinator
- Alicia Boardman – caterer (2017)
- Alison Higgins – caterer (2017)
- David Lesh – caterer (2017)
- Ed Stewart-Lockhart – management liaison
- Gareth Lewis – sound crew (2017)
- Eoin O'Cinnseala – sound crew (2017)
- Kyle Carter – sound crew (2017)
- Scott Walsh – lighting crew (2017)
- Simon Lake – lighting crew (2017)
- Neil Johnson – lighting crew (2017)
- Mark Cooper – lighting crew (2017)
- Graham Hill – lighting crew (2017)
- John Dall – lighting crew (2017)
- Rod Martin – video crew (2017)
- Robyn Tearle – video crew (2017)
- Luke Butler – video crew (2017)
- Paul Brierly – lead lorry driver (2017)
- Rob Campbell – lorry driver (2017)
- Brian Taplin – lorry driver (2017)
- Rachel Shadwick – lorry driver (2017)
- Steve Pearce – lorry driver (2017)
- Richard Batchelder – lorry driver (2017)
- Julian Meynell – lorry driver (2017)
- Paul Ramm – lorry driver (2017)
- Tony Allard – lorry driver (2017)
- Mark Herrning – nightliner driver (2017)
- Michael McCarthy – nightliner driver (2017)
- Brenton Andriske – nightliner driver (2017)
