= Legacy of the Beast World Tour =

2018–2022 concert tour by Iron Maiden

- World tour by Iron Maiden
- Official tour poster
- Location: Asia; Europe; North America; Oceania; South America
- Start date: 26 May 2018
- End date: 27 October 2022
- No. of shows: 140

Iron Maiden concert chronology
- The Book of Souls World Tour (2016–2017); Legacy of the Beast World Tour (2018–2022); The Future Past World Tour (2023–2024)

The Legacy of the Beast World Tour was a concert tour by the English heavy metal band Iron Maiden, named after the comic and mobile game Iron Maiden: Legacy of the Beast released by the band on 5 July 2016. Described as a "history/hits tour", Iron Maiden manager Rod Smallwood has revealed that the concerts and stage design will feature "a number of different but interlocking ‘worlds’ with a set list covering a large selection of 80s material with a handful of surprises from later albums." The tour started in Tallinn, Estonia in May 2018 and concluded in October 2022 in Tampa, Florida.

== Background ==
The Legacy of the Beast Tour production and set list were inspired by Maiden's free-to-play mobile game of the same name. The first leg, consisting of 38 European dates in 2018, was announced on 13 November 2017. The tour was extended into 2019 with North and South American dates and again into 2020 with Dates in Australia, New Zealand, Asia (Featuring their first ever show in The Philippines) and another run in Europe.

In March it was announced that the 2020 Oceania, Download Festival, and The Philippines shows were cancelled due to the COVID-19 pandemic. In April 2020, it was announced that Japan, Copenhell festival in Copenhagen, Graspop Metal Meeting in Belgium, the show in Wiener Neustadt, Austria, Germany, Paris, Tons of Rock, and Dubai were cancelled and next - postponed to 2021. In April 2021 it was announced that whole 2021 tour was cancelled once again and most of the European shows were rescheduled for 2022. The band cancelled their concerts in Kyiv and Moscow due to the 2022 Russian invasion of Ukraine in order to "ensure the safety of their fans".

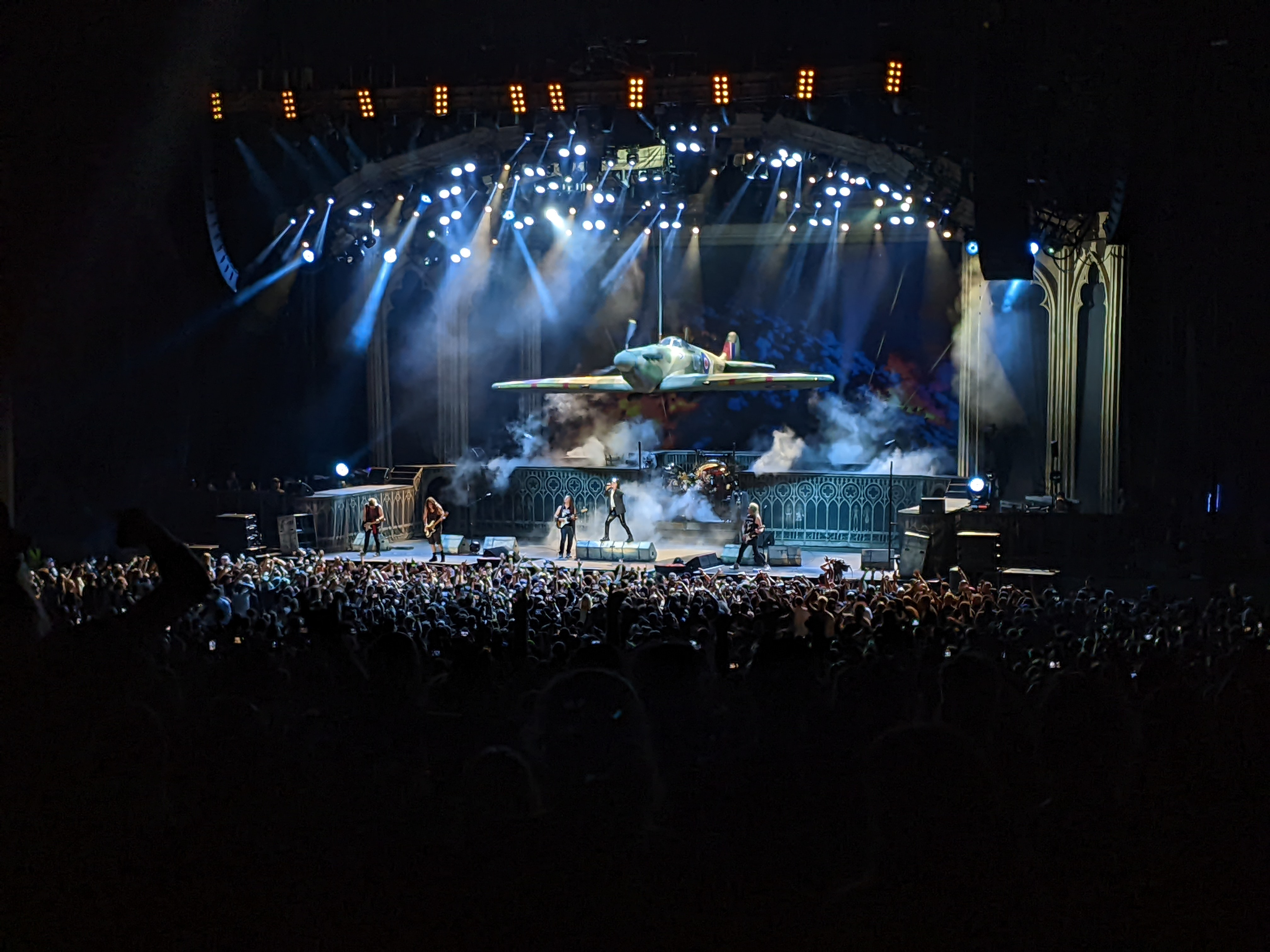
Iron Maiden performing in Chula Vista, CA on 25 September 2022

With 140 shows, it was the longest tour with Bruce Dickinson on vocals since the "Somewhere on Tour" in 1986–1987. During the tour, Iron Maiden performed to over 3.5 million fans and the tour was honored with CAA & K2 Award.

The tour was considered both by the fans and journalists as their most elaborate and successful to date. Iron Maiden headlined the Brazilian Rock in Rio Festival twice and regularly performed before auditories of 50,000 and 100,000 people. In July 2022 Pollstar published the list of Top 150 Touring Artists recapitulating the data of headlining shows in North America between 1981 and 2021. Iron Maiden scored position 35 with around 9.2 million tickets sold during this period.

== Opening acts ==
=== 2018 ===
- Killswitch Engage (26 May – 1 July; 31 July – 11 August)
- Sabaton (14 July)
- Gojira (14 July)
- Rhapsody of Fire (Trieste)
- The Raven Age (10 June – 17 July)
- Tremonti (9–18 July)

=== 2019 ===
- The Raven Age (18 July – 15 October)
- Fozzy (14 September)
- Rage in My Eyes (9 October)
- Serpentor (12 October)

=== 2022 ===
- Airbourne (13, 20, 26 and 27 June; 2, 4, 7, 9, 10, 20, 22, 26, 29 and 31 July)
- Within Temptation (24, 29 and 31 July and all October dates)
- Lord of the Lost (31 May, 2, 7, 20 and 30 June; 2, 4, 7, 9, 10 and 24 July)
- The Hellacopters (22 July)
- Sabaton (26 July)
- Shinedown (7 and 13 June)
- Powerwolf (20 July)
- Avatar (27, 30 August and 4 September)
- Mastodon (7 September)
- Trivium (11–30 September)

== Tour dates ==
List of 2018 concerts
Date	City	Country	Venue
26 May 2018	Tallinn	Estonia	Saku Arena
28 May 2018	Helsinki	Finland	Hartwall Arena
29 May 2018	Helsinki	Finland	Hartwall Arena
1 June 2018	Stockholm	Sweden	Tele2 Arena
3 June 2018 (Note: Part of Trondheim Rocks.)	Trondheim	Norway	Dahls Arena
5 June 2018	Copenhagen	Denmark	Royal Arena
7 June 2018 (Note: Part of Sweden Rock Festival.)	Norje	Sweden	Norje Havsbad
9 June 2018 (Note: Part of Rockavaria.)	Munich	Germany	Königsplatz
10 June 2018	Hanover	Germany	Expo Plaza
13 June 2018	Berlin	Germany	Waldbühne
16 June 2018 (Note: Part of Firenze Rocks.)	Florence	Italy	Visarno Arena
17 June 2018 (Note: Part of Nova Rock Festival.)	Nickelsdorf	Austria	Pannonia Fields II
20 June 2018	Prague	Czech Republic	Letňany Airport
22 June 2018 (Note: Part of Graspop Metal Meeting.)	Dessel	Belgium	Festivalpark Stenehei
24 June 2018 (Note: Part of Hellfest.)	Clisson	France	Val de Moine
26 June 2018	Geneva	Switzerland	SEG Geneva Arena
28 June 2018 (Note: Part of VOLT Festival.)	Sopron	Hungary	Lővér Camping Site
30 June 2018	Freiburg	Germany	Messe
1 July 2018	Arnhem	Netherlands	GelreDome
5 July 2018	Paris	France	AccorHotels Arena
6 July 2018	Paris	France	AccorHotels Arena
9 July 2018	Milan	Italy	San Siro Ippodromo
10 July 2018	Zürich	Switzerland	Hallenstadion
13 July 2018	Lisbon	Portugal	Altice Arena
14 July 2018	Madrid	Spain	Wanda Metropolitano
17 July 2018	Trieste	Italy	Piazza Unità d'Italia
20 July 2018 (Note: Part of Rockwave Festival.)	Athens	Greece	Terra Vibe Park
22 July 2018 (Note: Part of Hills of Rock.)	Plovdiv	Bulgaria	Plovdiv Stadium
24 July 2018	Zagreb	Croatia	Arena Zagreb
27 July 2018	Kraków	Poland	Tauron Arena
28 July 2018	Kraków	Poland	Tauron Arena
31 July 2018	Newcastle	England	Metro Radio Arena
2 August 2018	Belfast	Northern Ireland	SSE Arena
4 August 2018	Aberdeen	Scotland	Exhibition and Conference Centre
6 August 2018	Manchester	England	Manchester Arena
7 August 2018	Birmingham	England	Genting Arena
10 August 2018	London	England	The O_{2} Arena
11 August 2018	London	England	The O_{2} Arena

List of 2019 concerts
Date	City	Country	Venue
18 July 2019	Sunrise	United States	BB&T Center
20 July 2019	Atlanta	United States	Cellairis Amphitheatre
22 July 2019	Charlotte	United States	PNC Music Pavilion
24 July 2019	Bristow	United States	Jiffy Lube Live
26 July 2019	Brooklyn	United States	Barclays Center
27 July 2019	Brooklyn	United States	Barclays Center
30 July 2019	Philadelphia	United States	Wells Fargo Center
1 August 2019	Mansfield	United States	Xfinity Center
3 August 2019	Hartford	United States	Xfinity Theatre
5 August 2019	Montreal	Canada	Bell Centre
7 August 2019	Quebec City	Canada	Videotron Centre
9 August 2019	Toronto	Canada	Budweiser Stage
10 August 2019	Toronto	Canada	Budweiser Stage
13 August 2019	Buffalo	United States	KeyBank Center
15 August 2019	Cincinnati	United States	Riverbend Music Center
17 August 2019	Pittsburgh	United States	PPG Paints Arena
19 August 2019	Nashville	United States	Bridgestone Arena
22 August 2019	Tinley Park	United States	Hollywood Casino Amphitheatre
24 August 2019	Noblesville	United States	Ruoff Home Mortgage Music Center
26 August 2019	Saint Paul	United States	Xcel Energy Center
28 August 2019	Winnipeg	Canada	Bell MTS Place
30 August 2019	Edmonton	Canada	Rogers Place
31 August 2019	Calgary	Canada	Scotiabank Saddledome
3 September 2019	Vancouver	Canada	Rogers Arena
5 September 2019	Tacoma	United States	Tacoma Dome
6 September 2019	Portland	United States	Moda Center
9 September 2019	Sacramento	United States	Golden 1 Center
10 September 2019	Oakland	United States	Oakland Arena
13 September 2019	Las Vegas	United States	MGM Grand Garden Arena
14 September 2019	Los Angeles	United States	Banc of California Stadium
17 September 2019	Phoenix	United States	Talking Stick Resort Arena
19 September 2019	Albuquerque	United States	Isleta Amphitheater
21 September 2019	Dallas	United States	Dos Equis Pavilion
22 September 2019	The Woodlands	United States	Cynthia Woods Mitchell Pavilion
25 September 2019	San Antonio	United States	AT&T Center
27 September 2019	Mexico City	Mexico	Palacio de los Deportes
29 September 2019	Mexico City	Mexico	Palacio de los Deportes
30 September 2019	Mexico City	Mexico	Palacio de los Deportes
4 October 2019 (Note: Part of Rock in Rio.)	Rio de Janeiro	Brazil	City of Rock
6 October 2019	São Paulo	Brazil	Estádio do Morumbi
9 October 2019	Porto Alegre	Brazil	Arena do Grêmio
12 October 2019	Buenos Aires	Argentina	José Amalfitani Stadium
14 October 2019	Santiago	Chile	Movistar Arena
15 October 2019	Santiago	Chile	Estadio Nacional

List of 2022 concerts
Date	City	Country	Venue
22 May 2022 (Note: Originally 7 June 2021, but was rescheduled due to the COVID-19 pandemic.)	Zagreb	Croatia	Arena Zagreb
24 May 2022	Belgrade	Serbia	Štark Arena
26 May 2022	Bucharest	Romania	Romexpo
31 May 2022	Kaunas	Lithuania	Zalgirio Arena
2 June 2022	Riga	Latvia	Riga Arena
4 June 2022 (Note: Part of Rockfest Finland. The original date was on 5 June 2020 at Särkänniemi Event Beach in Tampere, but was rescheduled due to the COVID-19 pandemic.)	Hyvinkää	Finland	Hyvinkää Airfield
7 June 2022 (Note: Originally 9 June 2021, but was rescheduled due to the COVID-19 pandemic.)	Budapest	Hungary	Groupama Arena
11 June 2022 (Note: Part of Download Festival.)	Leicestershire	England	Donington Park
13 June 2022 (Note: Part of Belsonic.)	Belfast	Northern Ireland	Ormeau Park
16 June 2022	Dessel	Belgium	Festivalpark Stenehei
18 June 2022 (Note: Part of Copenhell.)	Copenhagen	Denmark	Refshaleøen
20 June 2022 (Note: Originally 15 June 2021, but was rescheduled due to the COVID-19 pandemic.)	Prague	Czech Republic	Sinobo Stadium
23 June 2022 (Note: Part of Tons of Rock.)	Oslo	Norway	Ekebergsletta
26 June 2022 (Note: Originally 11 July 2020, but was postponed to the same date in 2021, due to the COVID-19 pandemic. It was ultimately rescheduled to 26 June 2022.)	Nanterre	France	Paris La Defense Arena
27 June 2022 (Note: Originally 10 July 2021, but was rescheduled due to the COVID-19 pandemic.)	Arnhem	Netherlands	GelreDome
30 June 2022 (Note: Originally 13 July 2020, but was rescheduled due to the COVID-19 pandemic.)	Zurich	Switzerland	Hallenstadion
2 July 2022 (Note: Originally 10 June 2020, but was postponed to 8 July 2021, due to the COVID-19 pandemic. It was ultimately rescheduled to 2 July 2022.)	Cologne	Germany	RheinEnergieStadion
4 July 2022 (Note: Originally 23 June 2020, but was postponed to 30 June 2021, due to the COVID-19 pandemic. It was ultimately rescheduled to 4 July 2022.)	Berlin	Germany	Waldbühne
9 July 2022 (Note: Originally 18 July 2020, but was postponed to 26 June 2021, due to the COVID-19 pandemic. It was ultimately rescheduled to 9 July 2022.)	Stuttgart	Germany	Cannstatter Wasen
10 July 2022 (Note: Originally 16 July 2020, but was postponed to 16 June 2021, due to the COVID-19 pandemic. It was ultimately rescheduled to 10 July 2022.)	Wiener Neustadt	Austria	Neustadt Stadion
13 July 2022	Sofia	Bulgaria	Arena Armeec
16 July 2022 (Note: Part of Athens Rocks.)	Athens	Greece	Olympic Stadium
20 July 2022 (Note: Originally 9 June 2020, but was postponed to 13 June 2021, due to the COVID-19 pandemic. It was ultimately rescheduled to 20 July 2022.)	Bremen	Germany	Buergerweide
22 July 2022 (Note: Originally 27 June 2020, but was postponed to 3 July 2021, due to the COVID-19 pandemic. It was ultimately rescheduled to 22 July 2022.)	Gothenburg	Sweden	Ullevi
24 July 2022 (Note: Originally 5 July 2020, but was postponed to 11 June 2021, due to the COVID-19 pandemic. It was ultimately rescheduled to 24 July 2022.)	Warsaw	Poland	National Stadium
26 July 2022 (Note: Originally 6 July 2021, but was rescheduled due to the COVID-19 pandemic.)	Frankfurt	Germany	Deutsche Bank Park
29 July 2022 (Note: Originally 25 July 2020, but was postponed to 19 June 2021, due to the COVID-19 pandemic. It was ultimately rescheduled to 29 July 2022.)	Barcelona	Spain	Estadi Olímpic Lluís Companys
31 July 2022 (Note: Originally 23 July 2020, but was postponed to 21 June 2021, due to the COVID-19 pandemic. It was ultimately rescheduled to 31 July 2022.)	Lisbon	Portugal	Estádio Nacional
27 August 2022	Curitiba	Brazil	Pedreira Paulo Leminski
30 August 2022	Ribeirão Preto	Brazil	Arena Eurobike
2 September 2022	Rio de Janeiro	Brazil	Rock in Rio
4 September 2022	São Paulo	Brazil	Estádio do Morumbi
7 September 2022	Mexico City	Mexico	Foro Sol
11 September 2022	El Paso	United States	Don Haskins Center
13 September 2022	Austin	United States	Moody Center
15 September 2022	Tulsa	United States	BOK Center
17 September 2022	Denver	United States	Ball Arena
19 September 2022	West Valley City	United States	USANA Amphitheatre
21 September 2022	Anaheim	United States	Honda Center
22 September 2022	Anaheim	United States	Honda Center
25 September 2022	Chula Vista	United States	North Island Credit Union Amphitheatre
27 September 2022	Concord	United States	Concord Pavilion
29 September 2022	Seattle	United States	Climate Pledge Arena
30 September 2022	Spokane	United States	Spokane Arena
3 October 2022	Sioux Falls	United States	Denny Sanford Premier Center
5 October 2022	Chicago	United States	United Center
7 October 2022	Columbus	United States	Nationwide Arena
9 October 2022	Detroit	United States	Little Caesars Arena
11 October 2022	Toronto	Canada	Scotiabank Arena
12 October 2022	Hamilton	Canada	FirstOntario Centre
15 October 2022	Ottawa	Canada	Canadian Tire Centre
17 October 2022	Worcester	United States	DCU Center
19 October 2022	Elmont	United States	UBS Arena
21 October 2022	Newark	United States	Prudential Center
23 October 2022	Washington, D.C.	United States	Capital One Arena
25 October 2022	Greensboro	United States	Greensboro Coliseum
27 October 2022	Tampa	United States	Amalie Arena

== Cancelled shows ==
List of cancelled concerts showing date, city, country, venue, and reason for cancellation
Date	City	Country	Venue	Reason
1 May 2020	Perth	Australia	RAC Arena	COVID-19 pandemic
3 May 2020	Adelaide	Australia	Adelaide Entertainment Centre	COVID-19 pandemic
5 May 2020	Brisbane	Australia	Brisbane Entertainment Centre	COVID-19 pandemic
7 May 2020	Sydney	Australia	Qudos Bank Arena	COVID-19 pandemic
9 May 2020	Melbourne	Australia	Rod Laver Arena	COVID-19 pandemic
11 May 2020	Melbourne	Australia	Rod Laver Arena	COVID-19 pandemic
13 May 2020	Auckland	New Zealand	Spark Arena	COVID-19 pandemic
30 May 2020	Tel Aviv	Israel	Bloomfield Stadium	COVID-19 pandemic
16 May 2020 (Note: Intended to be part of Pulp Summer Slam.)	Quezon City	Philippines	Amoranto Sports Complex	COVID-19 pandemic
19 May 2020	Yokohama	Japan	Pia Arena MM	COVID-19 pandemic
20 May 2020	Yokohama	Japan	Pia Arena MM	COVID-19 pandemic
22 May 2020	Osaka	Japan	EDION Arena	COVID-19 pandemic
27 May 2020	Dubai	United Arab Emirates	Coca-Cola Arena	COVID-19 pandemic
30 June 2020	Saint-Petersburg	Russia	Ice Palace	COVID-19 pandemic
2 July 2020	Moscow	Russia	VTB Dynamo Moscow Stadium	COVID-19 pandemic
9 July 2020	Weert	Netherlands	Evenemententerrein Weert	COVID-19 pandemic
5 June 2021	Basel	Switzerland	St. Jakobshalle	COVID-19 pandemic
27 June 2021	Antwerp	Belgium	Sportpaleis	COVID-19 pandemic
29 May 2022	Kyiv	Ukraine	VDNG	2022 Russian invasion of Ukraine
1 June 2022	Moscow	Russia	VTB Arena	2022 Russian invasion of Ukraine
7 July 2022	Bologna	Italy	Arena Parco Nord	Bad weather

== Box office score data ==
Venue	City	Tickets sold / available	Gross revenue (USD)
Saku Suurhall	Tallinn	8,284 / 8,284 (100%)	$544,989
Hartwall Arena	Helsinki	20,344 / 20,344 (100%)	$2,072,080
Tele2 Arena	Stockholm	37,221 / 37,221 (100%)	$2,926,064
Royal Arena	Copenhagen	15,184 / 15,184 (100%)	$1,394,397
Expo Plaza	Hanover	21,900 / 21,900 (100%)	$1,678,755
Waldbühne	Berlin	15,757 / 17,000 (93%)	$1,408,961
Letňany Airport	Prague	29,763 / 30,000 (100%)	$2,314,576
Messe	Freiburg	30,000 / 30,000 (100%)	$2,311,161
GelreDome	Arnhem	20,026 / 23,200 (86%)	$1,646,254
AccorHotels Arena	Paris	30,794 / 30,794 (100%)	$2,189,356
San Siro Ippodromo	Milan	16,272 / 17,500 (93%)	$1,444,708
Wanda Metropolitano	Madrid	48,689 / 48,689 (100%)	$4,797,916
Tauron Arena	Kraków	30,617 / 30,617 (100%)	$2,173,988
Manchester Arena	Manchester	14,758 / 14,758 (100%)	$1,111,545
Total		339,609 / 345,491 (98%)	$28,014,750

== Personnel ==
Iron Maiden

- Bruce Dickinson – vocals
- Dave Murray – guitars
- Adrian Smith – guitars, backing vocals
- Janick Gers – guitars
- Steve Harris – bass, backing vocals
- Nicko McBrain – drums

Touring member

- Michael Kenney – keyboards
