= The Raven Age =

English heavy metal band

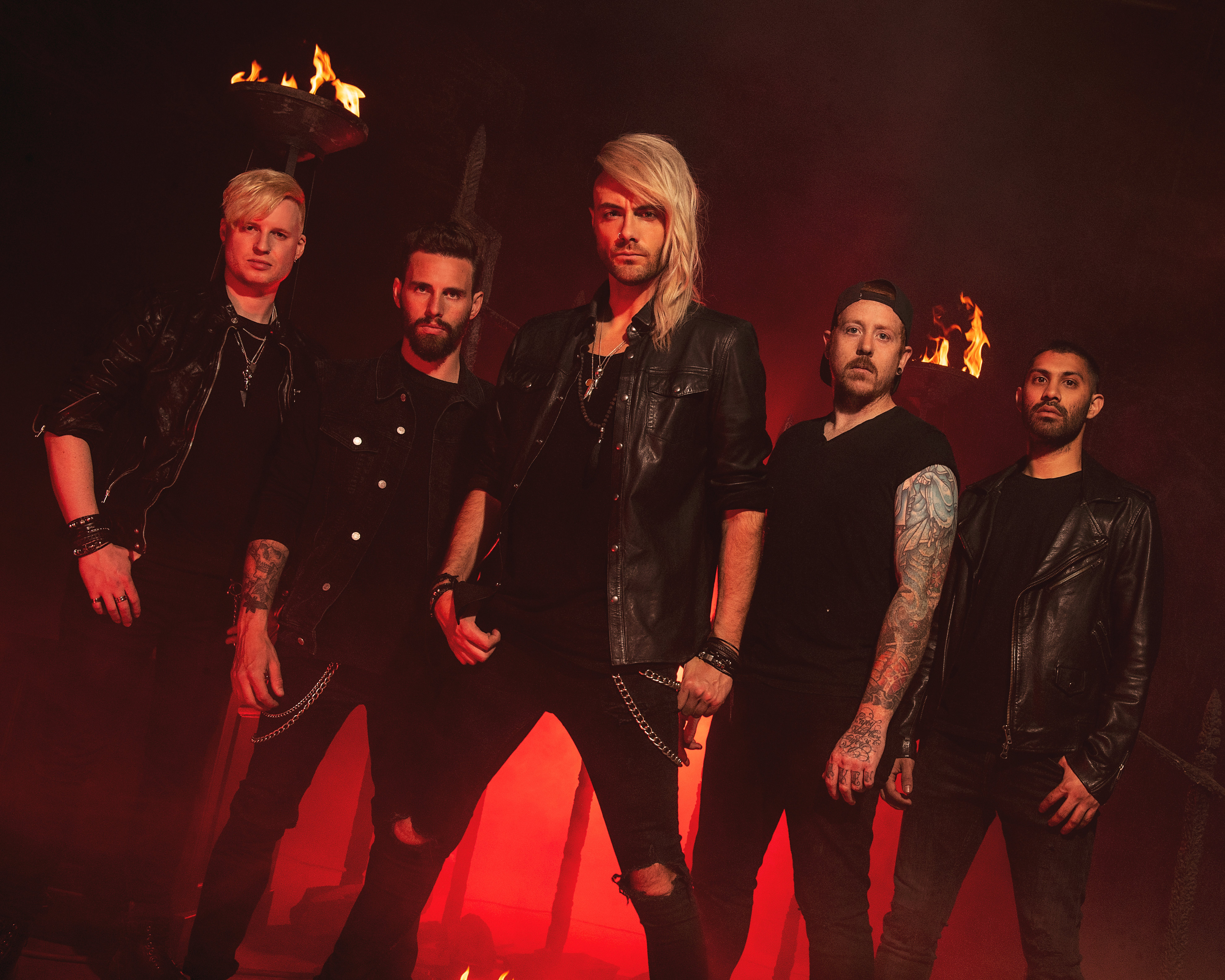
- The Raven Age in 2022

Background information
- Origin: London, England
- Genres: Groove metal; melodic metalcore
- Years active: 2009–present
- Members: George Harris; Matt Cox; Jai Patel; Matt James; Tommy Gentry
- Past members: Tony Maue; Michael Burrough; Dan Wright
- Website: www.theravenage.com

The Raven Age are an English heavy metal band formed in London in 2009 by guitarists George Harris and Dan Wright. Harris is the son of Iron Maiden bassist Steve Harris.

== History ==
In 2014, the band recorded and released their self-titled EP, before supporting Steve Harris' British Lion and Tremonti on separate tours. The band then supported Iron Maiden on The Book of Souls World Tour in 2016. On 2 August 2016, the band announced that their debut album, Darkness Will Rise, would be released in December 2016, but it was instead released in March 2017. The band supported Anthrax on the Among The Kings European Tour in 2017. They followed by supporting Killswitch Engage and Tremonti on their tours in 2018. The band released their second album, Conspiracy, on 8 March 2019. Conspiracy has received over 130,000 views on YouTube as of 12 June 2019. In 2023, The Raven Age released their third album, titled Blood Omen. On 29th November, the band dropped a new single titled 'The Guillotine'. On 20th June (8 days before supporting Iron Maiden at the London Stadium), the band dropped the single, 'Hangman'. On 4th November 2025, the band released 'Stand in the Fire'.

== Band members ==
=== Current ===
- George Harris – rhythm guitar (2009–present)
- Matt Cox – bass, backing vocals (2012–present)
- Jai Patel – drums (2013–present)
- Matt James – lead vocals (2018–present)
- Tommy Gentry – lead guitar (2015, 2022–present)

=== Former ===
- Dan Wright – lead guitar (2009–2017)
- Michael Burrough – lead vocals (2013–2017)
- Tony Maue – lead guitar (2017–2022)

=== Touring ===
- Gav Chester – rhythm guitar (2026)

== Discography ==
=== Studio albums ===
- Darkness Will Rise (2017)
- Conspiracy (2019)
- Blood Omen (2023)

=== Compilation Albums ===
- Exile (2021)

=== EPs ===
- The Raven Age (2014)

=== Singles ===
- Salem's Fate (2017)
- Surrogate (2018)
- Betrayal of the Mind (2018)
- The Day the World Stood Still (2019)
- Fleur de Lis (2019)
- No Man's Land (2021)
- As the World Stood Still (2021)
- Wait For Me (2021)
- Parasite (2023)
- Serpents Tongue (2023)
- Forgive & Forget (2023)
- The Guillotine (2024)
- Hangman (2025)
- Stand in the Fire (2025)
- Visions (2025)
