= Speed of Light (Iron Maiden song) =

Single by Iron Maiden

from the album The Book of Souls
- Released: 14 August 2015
- Recorded: 2014
- Studio: Guillaume Tell, Paris
- Genre: Heavy metal
- Length: 5:03
- Label: Parlophone, BMG (US)
- Songwriters: Adrian Smith; Bruce Dickinson
- Producer: Kevin Shirley

Iron Maiden singles chronology
"El Dorado" (2010)	"Speed of Light" (2015)	"Empire of the Clouds" (2016)

"Speed of Light" is a song by the English heavy metal band Iron Maiden from their sixteenth studio album, The Book of Souls. The song was released as a music video on 14 August 2015 and was also made available as a digital download and issued as a single-track CD exclusive to Best Buy in the US. It is the band's first single since 1996's "Virus" to use their original logo on the cover.

== Music video ==
The song's music video was directed and produced by Llexi Leon, creator of the comic book series Eternal Descent, as well as the virtual band of the same name. The video is an "'homage' to four decades of video gaming", centering on the band's mascot, Eddie, as he travels "through the combined 35-year history of video games". The visual effects were provided by The Brewery, who had previously worked on the films Sex & Drugs & Rock & Roll (2010) and Spike Island (2012), as well as the 2014 TV series Fleming: The Man Who Would Be Bond.

== Personnel ==
Iron Maiden

- Bruce Dickinson – vocals
- Dave Murray – guitars
- Adrian Smith – guitars
- Janick Gers – guitars
- Steve Harris – bass
- Nicko McBrain – drums

Production

- Kevin Shirley – production, mixing
- Steve Harris – co-production

== Charts ==
Weekly chart performance for "Different World"
Chart (2015)	Peak position
UK Rock & Metal (Official Charts)	3
