= Different World (Iron Maiden song) =

Single by Iron Maiden

from the album A Matter of Life and Death
- B-side: US CD single; "Hallowed Be Thy Name" (Radio 1 Legends Session), "The Trooper" (Radio 1 Legends Session); European CD single; "Iron Maiden" (live); European DVD single; "The Reincarnation of Benjamin Breeg" (live), "Hocus Pocus" (Focus cover); European 7" picture disc; "Fear of the Dark" (live)
- Released: 14 November 2006
- Recorded: 2006
- Studio: Sarm West (London)
- Genre: Heavy metal
- Length: 4:15
- Label: EMI; Sanctuary
- Songwriters: Adrian Smith; Steve Harris
- Producer: Kevin Shirley

Iron Maiden singles chronology
"The Reincarnation of Benjamin Breeg" (2006)	"Different World" (2006)	"El Dorado" (2010)

"Different World" is a song by English heavy metal band Iron Maiden. It is the opening track from their 14th studio album, A Matter of Life and Death (2006), and was released as the second single from the album. It was released on 14 November 2006 in the United States, and 26 December 2006 in Europe. The song has been stated by the band to be a tribute to Thin Lizzy due to the low sounding melodies sung by Bruce Dickinson that are reminiscent of those Phil Lynott would sing. It was also played first every night on the band's A Matter of Life and Death Tour.

The guitar solo in "Different World" is played by Adrian Smith.

== Music video ==
Two music videos of "Different World" were released. In the first, a computer-animated version of Dickinson is watching a factory of drones reorganizing test tubes. When one appears with a purple liquid in it, he takes the tube and runs. He is chased by more drones across an extremely high-up walkway, before leaping off the platform, and later through a garbage disposal chute. He exits the chute at high speed, and tries to grab hold of it but eventually falls. He lands on a zeppelin, and is grabbed by a drone. The drone carries him through the air before crashing into the ground, after which Bruce runs through the city to a woman who shows him a different world. In this vision, a young version of Bruce (who looks more like him than the older one) takes the test tube and throws it at the screen. The vision explodes and a giant Eddie stands up and begins to destroy the city. The camera zooms out, and a larger Eddie is revealed to be holding the planet, and throws it at the screen, ending the video.

The second version features the band recording the song in studio 1 of Sarm Studios, West London, UK. Portions of this video appear on the first version.

== Track listings ==
US CD single

1. "Different World" (Adrian Smith, Steve Harris) – 4:15
2. "Hallowed Be Thy Name (Radio 1 'Legends' Session)" (Harris) – 7:13
3. "The Trooper (Radio 1 'Legends' Session)" (Harris) – 3:56

Digital single

The interview with Steve Harris was only available if pre-ordered before 26 December 2006 through the Iron Maiden website.

1. "Different World" (Recorded live in Aalborg on the A Matter of Life and Death tour, 9 November 2006) (Smith, Harris) – 4:18
2. Interview with Steve Harris on A Matter of Life and Death – 10:38

European CD single

1. "Different World" (Smith, Harris) – 4:15
2. "Iron Maiden" (Recorded live in Copenhagen on the A Matter of Life and Death tour, 10 November 2006) (Harris) – 5:40

European DVD single

1. "Different World" (Smith, Harris) – 4:17
2. "The Reincarnation of Benjamin Breeg" (Recorded live in Copenhagen on the A Matter of Life and Death tour, 10 November 2006) (Dave Murray, Harris) – 7:47
3. "Hocus Pocus" (Thijs van Leer, Jan Akkerman; Focus cover) – 5:31

European 7" picture disc

1. "Different World" (Smith, Harris) – 4:15
2. "Fear of the Dark" (Recorded live in Copenhagen on the A Matter of Life and Death tour, 10 November 2006) (Harris) – 7:47

== Personnel ==
Production credits are adapted from the European CD, DVD, and picture disc covers.

Iron Maiden

- Bruce Dickinson – vocals
- Dave Murray – guitar
- Adrian Smith – guitar, backing vocals
- Janick Gers – guitar
- Steve Harris – bass, backing vocals, co-producer (studio songs), executive producer (live songs)
- Nicko McBrain – drums

Production

- Kevin Shirley – producer, mixing
- Tony Newton – recording, mixing (live songs)
- Howard Greenhalgh – director ("Different World" video)

== Charts ==
Weekly chart performance for "Different World"
Chart (2006–07)	Peak position
Denmark (Tracklisten)	3
Finland (Suomen virallinen lista)	1
France (SNEP)	99
Germany (GfK)	40
Greece (IFPI)	5
Ireland (IRMA)	39
Italy (FIMI)	3
Scottish Singles Sales (Official Charts)	3
Spain (Promusicae)	1
Sweden (Sverigetopplistan)	52
UK Singles (Official Charts)	3
UK Rock & Metal (Official Charts)	1
