= A Matter of Life and Death (album) =

Studio album by Iron Maiden
- Released: 25 August 2006
- Recorded: 1 March – 4 May 2006
- Studio: Sarm West (London)
- Genres: Heavy metal; progressive metal
- Length: 71:53
- Label: EMI
- Producer: Kevin Shirley

Iron Maiden chronology
Death on the Road (2005)	A Matter of Life and Death (2006)	Somewhere Back in Time (2008)

Singles from A Matter of Life and Death
- 1. "The Reincarnation of Benjamin Breeg" Released: 14 August 2006; 2. "Different World" Released: 14 November 2006

A Matter of Life and Death is the fourteenth studio album by English heavy metal band Iron Maiden. It was released on 25 August 2006 in Italy and Finland and 28 August worldwide—excluding the US, Canada and Japan, where it was released on 5 September. It is the first album in Iron Maiden's career to enter the US Billboard charts in the top 10, achieving significant chart success in many other countries as well.

While it is not a concept album, war and religion are recurring themes throughout, as well as in the cover artwork.

The band supported the album with the A Matter of Life and Death Tour, during which they played the record in its entirety.

== Overview ==
Iron Maiden began writing new songs near the end of 2005, after a break following their hugely successful festival dates in the US and Europe during the Eddie Rips Up the World Tour. After taking time off over Christmas, the songs were completed and the band began recording at Sarm West Studios in London, with their regular producer, Kevin Shirley. The album was recorded from 1 March to 4 May 2006.

To provide a more "live" sound, the album was not mastered. Shirley said, "Spoke to 'Arry (Steve Harris) on Friday, who has decided against mastering the Iron Maiden album ... It means that you will get to hear the new album exactly as it sounded in the studio, no added EQ, compression, analogue widening, etc., and I must say, I am pretty happy with the end result."

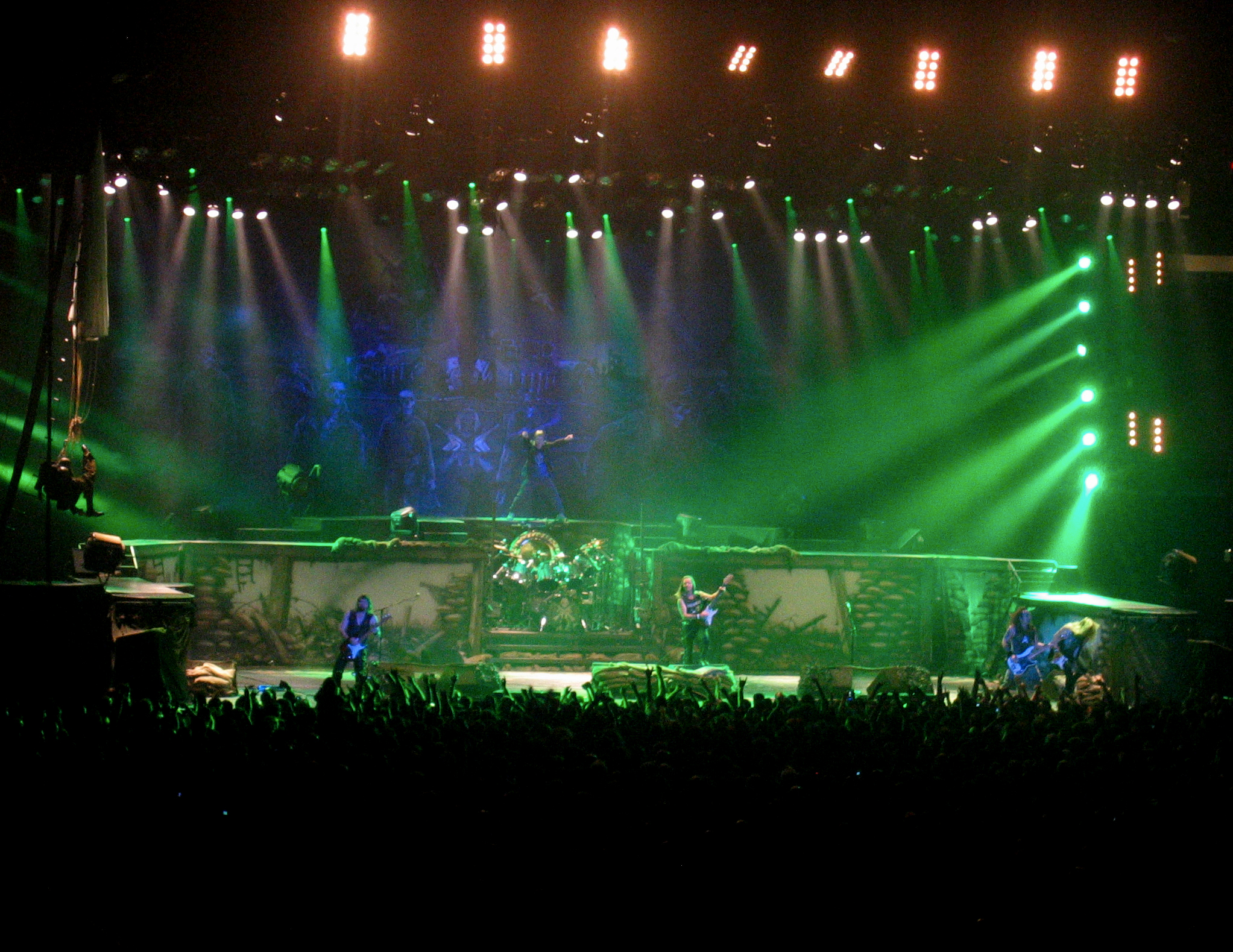
Iron Maiden during the A Matter of Life and Death Tour, in which they performed the album in its entirety.

Speaking to Metal Hammer in September 2006, lead vocalist Bruce Dickinson commented that "Everyone was up for pushing things as far as they'd go, but the record was so easy to make." Dickinson went on to claim that they "finished the record with two months to spare," with Harris adding, "A lot of what you hear are first time takes." Speaking about the record's musical style, Harris states that "It is heavier than we've ever been, but also very progressive. And I don't mean that in the modern sense, but like Dream Theater, more in a 70s way."

A Matter of Life and Death is Iron Maiden's fourth studio album that does not have a title track, following Piece of Mind, The X Factor and Virtual XI. Drummer Nicko McBrain and guitarist Janick Gers claim that the band originally intended to name the album after one of its tracks, with both "The Pilgrim" and "The Legacy" being considered. According to Gers, "sometimes a title will just leap out at you as the obvious choice, but it didn't this time for some reason", so the band decided on A Matter of Life and Death, which, according to McBrain, was amongst "two or three ideas which we were kicking around". Neither Gers nor McBrain can remember who came up with the title, which they state was thought up by either Harris, Rod Smallwood (the band's manager) or "Drew" (an engineer at Sarm West Studios).

The album cover was created by Tim Bradstreet, an American artist, best known for his work on the Hellblazer and Punisher comics. A lifelong Iron Maiden fan, who drew much influence from Derek Riggs' artwork for them, Bradstreet described the opportunity as "one of my wildest dreams". He had a tight schedule, receiving for reference the songs to listen to and key art done by Peacock Designs UK, who directed the booklet's artwork. Along with redrawing a few of the original elements – which featured the tank described by Bradstreet as "Korean War era but with a twist" as the gun barrel is patched over from another vehicle – Bradstreet added Eddie as a general leading an army of skeletons. Bradstreet's colourist partner Grant Goleash finished the art, which was then retouched by Peacock. The back cover would originally feature Eddie shot on the back, but then the band opted to instead feature a detail of the tank icon featuring Eddie's head along with crossed guns.

During the 2006 leg of the A Matter of Life and Death Tour, Iron Maiden performed the album in its entirety, which received a mixed response. The band still supports their decision to play the record in full, with McBrain commenting that "I think that this is the best album I've ever made with this band" and that "a lot of people [were] very happy to hear this album in its entirety", while Dickinson says that doing so contributed to the fact that "the fans are attracted to us because we are still an active musical force".

== Single details ==
The first single to be released from the album was "The Reincarnation of Benjamin Breeg", released on 14 August 2006. On 10 August, "Different World" was made available for public streaming on the band's website, as was "Brighter than a Thousand Suns" the following day. "Different World" was the second single, receiving airplay on many rock radio stations. The song also features an animated video, similar to that of "Wildest Dreams".

== DVD documentary ==
In addition to the standard CD release, A Matter of Life and Death was also released in a limited edition version containing a bonus DVD. The DVD, which has a total runtime of nearly one hour, contains a half-hour documentary, plus videos and photos all shot while the band were making the album. The documentary, entitled "The Making of A Matter of Life and Death", directed by Matthew Amos (director of The Early Days and Death on the Road DVD documentaries), features candid video footage shot largely by Kevin Shirley himself during the recording of the album giving a behind-the-scenes look at life in the studio. The bonus DVD also features the full video promo for "The Reincarnation of Benjamin Breeg", and a special filming of the band recording "Different World" in the studio. The album was also released as a limited-edition double picture disc vinyl in gatefold sleeve, and as a digital download.

== Critical reception ==
Professional ratings
Review scores
Source	Rating
About.com	4.5/5 stars
AllMusic	3.5/5 stars
Blabbermouth.net	5.5/10
BW&BK	6.5/10
Classic Rock	9/10
Entertainment Weekly	B−
IGN	8.3/10
Metal Hammer	10/10
PopMatters	8/10
Sputnikmusic	5/5 stars

The album was met with highly positive reviews from music critics. Metal Hammer rated it 10 out of 10, stating that "Iron Maiden have utterly surpassed themselves" and that "it makes for a riveting listen." Sputnikmusic also gave it full marks, commenting, "A Matter of Life and Death contains everything fans want to hear; be it exciting, Maiden-style story telling; aggressive riffs; impressive solos; or melodic harmonies." BBC Music praised the band for "their uncanny ability to write great lyrics wrapped around guitar orchestration that rock fans crave", concluding, "In this world of hopeless auto-tuned mediocrity here is a British band that consistently crafts fantastic music that surprises reviewers and fans alike." IGN awarded it 8.3 out of 10, praising the album as "the crew's best release since Piece of Mind". PopMatters rated it 8 out of 10, deeming it "their most focused record since 1988's Seventh Son of a Seventh Son, one that eschews crowd-pleasing anthems in favour of massive, sprawling compositions." Classic Rock gave the album a score of 9 out of 10, stating that "it's not only Maiden's best since the 80s but quite possibly their finest release since 1983's Piece of Mind," and awarded it "Album of the Year" at the 2006 Classic Rock Roll of Honour Awards. The album was voted Best Album in the 2006 Burrn! magazine readers' poll. It also won the 2006 Metal Storm Award for Best Heavy Metal Album.

Rolling Stone gave the album 3 stars out of 5, finding the music and lyrics "relevant", although also claiming that "the songs now march where they once galloped", implying that the band is "ageing gracefully". AllMusic were also less positive, rating it 3.5 out of 5 and commenting that it is "a more elaborate and meandering experience than [its predecessor] Dance of Death, but a rewarding one for fans willing to indulge the group's occasional excess".

== Track listing ==
A Matter of Life and Death track listing
No.	Title	Writer(s)	Length
1.	"Different World"	Adrian Smith; Steve Harris	4:17
2.	"These Colours Don't Run"	Smith; Harris; Bruce Dickinson	6:52
3.	"Brighter Than a Thousand Suns"	Smith; Harris; Dickinson	8:44
4.	"The Pilgrim"	Janick Gers; Harris	5:07
5.	"The Longest Day"	Smith; Harris; Dickinson	7:48
6.	"Out of the Shadows"	Dickinson; Harris	5:36
7.	"The Reincarnation of Benjamin Breeg"	Dave Murray; Harris	7:21
8.	"For the Greater Good of God"	Harris	9:23
9.	"Lord of Light"	Smith; Harris; Dickinson	7:25
10.	"The Legacy"	Gers; Harris	9:20
Total length:			71:53

=== Limited edition DVD ===
1. The Making of A Matter of Life and Death – 30:15
2. "The Reincarnation of Benjamin Breeg" music video – 7:23
3. Studio performance footage of "Different World" – 4:17
4. Photo gallery – 5:36

== Personnel ==
Production and performance credits are adapted from the album liner notes.

=== Iron Maiden ===
- Bruce Dickinson – vocals
- Dave Murray – guitars
- Adrian Smith – guitars, backing vocals, guitar synthesiser on "Brighter Than a Thousand Suns"
- Janick Gers – guitars
- Steve Harris – bass guitar, keyboards, backing vocals, co-producer
- Nicko McBrain – drums

=== Production ===
- Kevin "Caveman" Shirley – producer, mixing, engineer
- Drew Griffiths – engineer
- Alex MacKenzie – assistant engineer
- Tim Bradstreet – cover illustration
- Grant Goleash – cover illustration
- Peacock – art direction, design
- Simon Fowler – photography
- John McMurtrie – photography
- Matthew Amos – documentary and music video director (bonus DVD)
- Kit Hawkins – producer (bonus DVD)
- Dave Pattenden – producer (bonus DVD)

== Commercial performance ==
On 14 September, Iron Maiden released an update which stated that "in just the first week the new album has shipped over a million copies worldwide and impacted on the charts pretty well everywhere in the world". This was their first album to chart in the top ten in the Billboard 200, reportedly selling 56,000 units in its first week. Debuting at No. 4, it was the highest-charting rock album ever in India, until their fifteenth studio album, The Final Frontier, which debuted at No. 1. A Matter of Life and Death also achieved gold status in Finland in its first week, the band's eighth from the country.

== Charts ==
Chart (2006)	Peak position
Australian Albums (ARIA)	12
Austrian Albums (Ö3 Austria)	4
Belgian Albums (Ultratop Flanders)	8
Belgian Albums (Ultratop Wallonia)	7
Canadian Albums (Billboard)	2
Croatian International Albums (HDU)	1
Danish Albums (Hitlisten)	8
Dutch Albums (Album Top 100)	7
Finnish Albums (Suomen virallinen lista)	1
French Albums (SNEP)	5
German Albums (Offizielle Top 100)	1
Hungarian Albums (MAHASZ)	2
Irish Albums (IRMA)	5
Italian Albums (FIMI)	1
Japanese Albums (Oricon)	11
New Zealand Albums (RMNZ)	16
Norwegian Albums (VG-lista)	2
Polish Albums (ZPAV)	1
Portuguese Albums (AFP)	11
Scottish Albums (Official Charts)	4
Spanish Albums (Promusicae)	4
Swedish Albums (Sverigetopplistan)	1
Swiss Albums (Schweizer Hitparade)	2
UK Albums (Official Charts)	4
UK Rock & Metal Albums (Official Charts)	1
US Billboard 200	9

Chart (2010)	Peak position
Greek Albums (IFPI)	63

== Certifications ==
Region	Certification	Certified units/sales
Brazil (Pro-Música Brasil)	Gold	30,000^{*}
Canada (Music Canada)	Gold	50,000^{^}
Finland (Musiikkituottajat)	Platinum	32,882
Germany (BVMI)	Gold	100,000^{^}
Greece (IFPI Greece)	Gold	7,500^{^}
Ireland (IRMA)	Gold	25,000
Norway (IFPI Norway)	Gold	20,000^{*}
Sweden (GLF)	Gold	30,000^{^}
Switzerland (IFPI Switzerland)	Gold	15,000^{^}
United Kingdom (BPI)	Gold	100,000^{^}
^{*} Sales figures based on certification alone.^{^} Shipments figures based on certification alone.
