= The Reincarnation of Benjamin Breeg =

Single by Iron Maiden

from the album A Matter of Life and Death
- B-side: "Hallowed Be Thy Name" (Radio 1 Legends Session); "The Trooper (Radio 1 Legends Session); "Run to the Hills" (Radio 1 Legends Session)
- Released: 14 August 2006
- Recorded: Sarm West (London)
- Genre: Heavy metal
- Length: 7:21
- Label: Columbia; EMI
- Songwriters: Dave Murray; Steve Harris
- Producer: Kevin Shirley

Iron Maiden singles chronology
"The Trooper (Live in 2003)" (2005)	"The Reincarnation of Benjamin Breeg" (2006)	"Different World" (2006)

"The Reincarnation of Benjamin Breeg" is a song by Iron Maiden, released on 14 August 2006 as the lead single from their fourteenth studio album, A Matter of Life and Death. It preceded the release of the album by eleven days.

The CD single comes with a B-side of "Hallowed Be Thy Name" from the BBC Radio 1 Legends Session. The single was also released on 10" clear vinyl single, which includes BBC Sessions versions of "The Trooper" and "Run to the Hills" on the B-side.

For the EU pressing of the 10" vinyl the sleeve and labels state that it should be played at 33.3 RPM. This is actually incorrect and the correct playing speed is 45 RPM. The USA issue plays correctly at 33.3 RPM.

A promotional version of the single was released on 14 August 2006, featuring the full version and a shorter version called 'edited version' in the US promo CD and 'rock club mix' in the UK promo CD (both versions are identical). The single was not allowed to have a place in the UK charts because the overall music time on the CD exceeded the time limit for it to be classed as a single.

On 17 July 2006, a music video for the song was uploaded on the band's official website. It had initially been released only for paying fan club members, but it was leaked within minutes and viewed by many fans who posted the link on various Iron Maiden discussion forums. The video displays them performing in the studio along with classic photos and clips of the band over their lengthy career.

The guitar solo is played by Dave Murray.

== The character ==
The single's promotional image shows Eddie (the band's mascot) digging out the grave of Benjamin Breeg, whose tombstone states "Aici zace un om despre care nu se știe prea mult". This is a sentence in Romanian, which translates into "Here lies a man about whom not much is known." The identity of the character is being held secret by band members. Steve Harris, in an interview featured on the DVD (with special edition CD album), was quoted as saying: "Who is Benjamin Breeg? Ah, now that would be telling".

Just before the time of the single's release, a website was created containing a 'biography' of Benjamin Breeg. According to the website, the creator was a cousin of Benjamin's searching for him after he ran across an obscure photograph of his long lost cousin in a box of his recently deceased grandmother's belongings.

=== 'Biography' of Benjamin Breeg ===
The 'biography' stated that Benjamin Breeg was born on 3 September 1939 (the date that France, the UK, New Zealand, and Australia declared war on Germany after their invasion of Poland, forming the Allied powers), in London, England. Both of his parents died in a still-unexplained house fire in 1947, and Benjamin was sent to an orphanage. He was smart but very much a loner. Here he took up a fascination with religion and thought of becoming a clergyman. He was never able to settle in with any of the three families that fostered him, and after he turned ten began to experience nightmares. He began to show artistic talent and made many paintings which have since been lost; it is presumed that Benjamin destroyed them himself. His paintings were disturbing to others and when asked what inspired the drawings, he said he painted what he saw in his nightmares. He left the orphanage in 1954 and got a job engraving tombstones at a funeral home. He lived alone and by this time his interest in religion had become almost an obsession. Traveling the world from 1960 to 1970, he moved back to England in 1971. He took up a job at the International Institute of Paranormal Investigation, and over the next six years wrote at least four books on occult practices in countries he'd visited. He disappeared on 18 June 1978, and still has not been found. The cousin of Benjamin who created the webpage asked anyone who knew anything about his whereabouts to contact him, and, according to the final chapter of the story, one man did. The cousin arranged a meeting with the man that was set to take place on 14 August 2006.

The website, as well as the biography of Benjamin Breeg, was completely fictional, and was later found to have been created by the band to increase publicity since they knew that fans would research the name trying to figure out who the character was. The date that the cousin and the informant were supposed to meet was none other than the date of the single's release. The website – which has since been taken down – sported an image that was allegedly painted by Benjamin Breeg himself. This was a dead give-away for fans who recognized that it showed none other than Eddie, the band's mascot, easily discernible by Eddie's one red glowing eye which he has had since the album Somewhere in Time. There is a snapshot available from the old website where is possible to see Benjamin Breeg's alleged painting, dated back to November 4, 2006.

== Track listing ==
=== 2 track CD ===
1. "The Reincarnation of Benjamin Breeg" (Dave Murray, Steve Harris) – 7:21
2. "Hallowed Be Thy Name" (Radio 1 'Legends' Session) (Harris) – 7:13

=== Promo Edition ===
1. "The Reincarnation of Benjamin Breeg (Murray, Harris) – 7:21
2. "The Reincarnation of Benjamin Breeg (Rock Club Version)" (Murray, Harris) – 5:25

=== 10" clear vinyl disc ===
1. "The Reincarnation of Benjamin Breeg" (Murray, Harris) – 7:21
2. "The Trooper" (Radio 1 'Legends' Session) (Harris) – 3:56
3. "Run to the Hills" (Radio 1 'Legends' Session) (Harris) – 3:59

== Personnel ==
Production credits are adapted from the CD and picture disc covers.

Iron Maiden

- Bruce Dickinson – vocals
- Dave Murray – guitars
- Adrian Smith – guitars
- Janick Gers – guitars
- Steve Harris – bass, keyboards, co-producer
- Nicko McBrain – drums

Production

- Kevin Shirley – producer, engineer, mixing ("The Reincarnation of Benjamin Breeg")
- Simon Askew – producer (Radio 1 sessions)
- Jerry Smith – mixing (Radio 1 sessions)
- Melvyn Grant – cover illustration
- Benjamin Breeg – inside painting
- Peacock – art direction, design

== Charts ==
=== Weekly charts ===
Chart (2006)	Peak position
Denmark (Tracklisten)	4
Finland (Suomen virallinen lista)	1
France (SNEP)	70
Germany (GfK)	39
Ireland (IRMA)	18
Norway (VG-lista)	9
Spain (Promusicae)	1
Sweden (Sverigetopplistan)	1
Switzerland (Schweizer Hitparade)	74

=== Year-end charts ===
Chart (2006)	Position
Sweden (Sverigetopplistan)	39
