= John McMurtrie =

British music photographer (born 1969)

John McMurtrie (born 1969) is a British music photographer. He makes portraits of musicians, usually in the heavy rock arena. He has shot covers for Metal Hammer magazine and Total Guitar magazine and also contributes to Rolling Stone (USA) and Q magazine (UK).

He is the official photographer for Iron Maiden and author of the book Iron Maiden: On Board Flight 666, a behind-the-scenes photo documentary. It includes photographs taken during the Somewhere Back In Time Tour (2008–09) and The Final Frontier Tour (2010–11) aboard the band's custom Boeing 757, Ed Force One. A presentation of the book was held from 5 to 31 August 2011 at the British Music Experience at the London O2.

On 20 November 2014, the paperback version of On Board Flight 666 was published by Orion.

IRON MAIDEN ROYAL MAIL STAMPS - John Photographed 5 of the 8 Special postal stamps issued in Feb 2023.

On 29 March 2012 at the 2011 Professional Photographer of the Year awards, McMurtrie won the Best Portfolio award and was runner-up for News Editorial Photographer of the Year. He was a runner-up for News Photographer of the Year in 2011 and was nominated for the 2012 Terry O'Neill award.

He was listed in Professional Photographer magazine's "100 Photography Heroes" 2013 special issue.
