= Who Cares =

Who Cares or Who Cares? may refer to:

== Music ==
=== Groups ===
- Who Cares? (band), the ensemble responsible for performing 1985 charity single "Doctor in Distress"
- WhoCares, a musical charity project by Ian Gillan, Tony Iommi & Friends

=== Albums ===
- Who Cares? (album), by Rex Orange County (2022)
- Ian Gillan & Tony Iommi: WhoCares, by WhoCares
- Who Cares, by Australian rock band the Poor

=== Songs ===
- "Who Cares?" (George and Ira Gershwin song) (1931)
- "Who Cares?" (Gnarls Barkley song) (2006)
- "Who Cares" (Paul McCartney song) (2018)
- "Who Cares", by Don Gibson song (1959)
- "Who Cares", by Unwound from Leaves Turn Inside You (2001)
- "Who Cares?", by Huey Lewis and the News from Huey Lewis and the News (1980)

== Film ==
- Who Cares? (1919 film), a silent comedy film starring Constance Talmadge
- Who Cares (1925 film), a silent film starring Dorothy Devore

== Other uses ==
- Who Cares? (ballet), a 1970 ballet by George Balanchine made to songs by George Gershwin

== See also ==
- Who Cares a Lot? The Greatest Hits, a compilation album by Faith No More
  - Who Cares a Lot? The Greatest Videos, a video compilation album by Faith No More
