= List of awards and nominations received by Iron Maiden =

Music Band

Iron Maiden awards and nominations
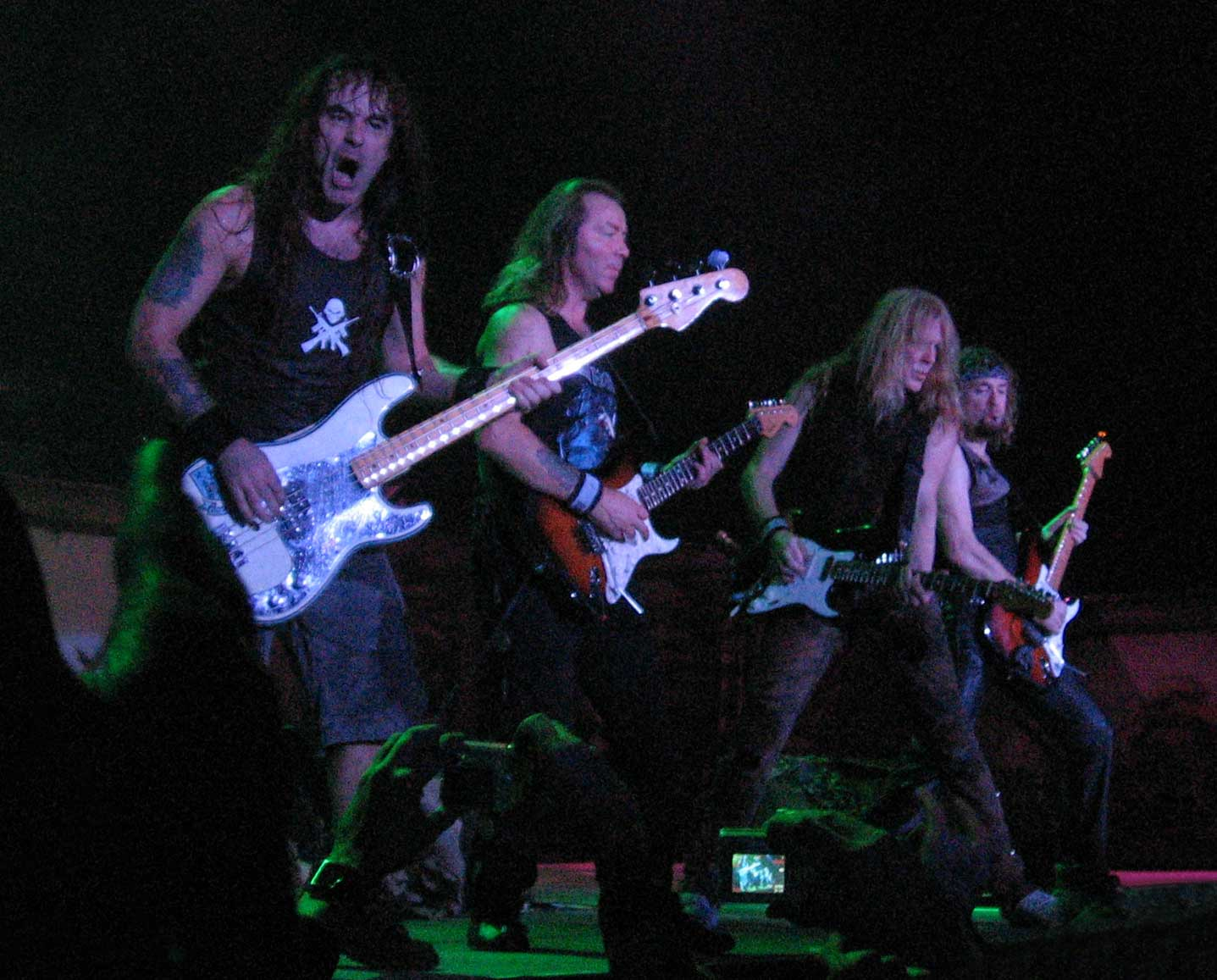
- Iron Maiden performing in Barcelona on 30 November 2006, during A Matter of Life and Death Tour.
Awards and nominations
Award	Wins	Nominations

Totals (Note: Certain award groups do not simply award one winner. They acknowledge several different recipients, have runners-up, and have third place. Since this is a specific recognition and is different from losing an award, runner-up mentions are considered wins in this award tally. For simplification and to avoid errors, each award in this list has been presumed to have had a prior nomination.)
- Wins: 197
- Nominations: 239

Iron Maiden are an English heavy metal band, formed in 1975 by bassist and only original member Steve Harris, and since 1999, also consists of vocalist Bruce Dickinson, guitarists Dave Murray, Adrian Smith and Janick Gers, and drummer Nicko McBrain. The musicians have received multiple nominations, honors, and awards including some of the most notable ones. The band have released seventeen studio albums, and have sold over 130 million albums worldwide. During the celebrations of the 60th anniversary of the accession of Queen Elizabeth II on 6 February 1952, The Number of the Beast was voted the best British album of the past 60 years. In 2016 Iron Maiden were given the titles of Honorary Visitors of the Country Award in El Salvador, and in 2019 they were honored as Visitors Of The Nation and Chamber of Deputies of Argentina, the first time the honor was given to an international artist. The motion was proposed and passed by the Chamber of Deputies of the Argentinian Congress in recognition of the cultural and musical influence of the band and their music on the people of Argentina. In 2023 Iron Maiden were honoured by Royal Mail UK with dedicated postal stamps and cards. In July 2025, Iron Maiden were honored with an official Royal Mint coin commemorating their 50th anniversary. On 13 April 2026, Iron Maiden were inducted into Rock and Roll Hall of Fame. In June 2026, the band's manager, Rod Smallwood, received the "Order of the British Empire" (OBE) as part of the King's Birthday Honors. This recognition completed the band's 50th Anniversary celebrations. In July, to celebrate Armed Forces Day UK, the band's logo and mascot were featured on the official emblem of the RAF Odiham UK combat unit. and the group's management launched the world's first open-air museum dedicated to the 50-year history of Iron Maiden: Infinite Dreams Experience.

== Apollo Glasgow Award ==
The Apollo Glasgow Award was a trophy given to musicians who sold out the historic Apollo Theater Glasgow between 1970 and 1985. Iron Maiden archived this feat 4 times.

Year	Nominee / work	Award	Result
1980	Iron Maiden	Apollo Glasgow Award	Won
1981	Iron Maiden	Apollo Glasgow Award	Won
1982	Iron Maiden	Apollo Glasgow Award	Won
1983	Iron Maiden	Apollo Glasgow Award	Won

== ARIA Australia Sales Award ==
One Sales Recognition Awards from Australia. In 1992 Record Sales Achievement – Iron Maiden for well over half a million copies of albums sold in Australia.

Year	Nominee / work	Award	Result
1992	Iron Maiden	Sales Recognition	Won

== Ampex Golden Reel Award ==
The Golden Reel Award was an international music award for studio albums and singles that were recorded and mixed entirely on Ampex audio tape, and which subsequently sold enough units to achieve gold record status in their country of origin. 8 of Iron Maiden’s albums won the award.

Year	Nominee / work	Award	Result
1981	Killers	Golden Reel Award	Won
1983	Peace of Mind	Golden Reel Award	Won
1984	Powerslave	Golden Reel Award	Won
1985	Live After Death	Golden Reel Award	Won
1986	Somewhere in Time	Golden Reel Award	Won
1988	Seventh Son of a Seventh Son	Golden Reel Award	Won
1990	No Prayer for the Dying	Golden Reel Award	Won
1992	Fear of the Dark	Golden Reel Award	Won

== Bandit Rock Awards ==
The Bandit Rock Awards are an annual ceremony held by the Swedish radio station of the same name. Iron Maiden have received eight awards.

Year	Nominee / work	Award	Result
2005	Iron Maiden	Best International Live Act	Won
2006	A Matter of Life and Death	Best International Album	Won
2011	Iron Maiden	Best International Live Act	Won
2015	Iron Maiden	Best International Live Act	Won
2016	The Book of Souls	Best International Album	Won
2016	Iron Maiden	Best International Live Act	Won
2019	Iron Maiden	Best International Live Act	Won
2026	Iron Maiden	Best International Live Act	Won

== BBC Radio Awards ==
The British Broadcasting Corporation (BBC) is the national broadcaster of the United Kingdom. Bruce Dickinson's original radio shows (as Iron Maiden vocalist) were awarded by listeners and the journalists. Iron Maiden as a band were honoured two times.

Year	Nominee / work	Award	Result
2002	Bruce Dickinson	Best Music DJ Sony Award	Won
2005	"Bring Your Daughter... to the Slaughter"	Best UK Single Ever	2nd
2006	Bruce Dickinson	Best Rock Programm	Won
2008	Bruce Dickinson	Golden Rock Mike	Won
2009	Iron Maiden	Greatest Metal Band Of All Time	Won
2010	Bruce Dickinson	Best Author's Programm	Won

== BRIT Awards ==
The BRIT Awards are the British Phonographic Industry's annual pop music awards. Iron Maiden have received one award from two nominations.

Year	Nominee / work	Award	Result
1992	"Bring Your Daughter... to the Slaughter"	Best British Single	Nominated
2009	Iron Maiden	Best British Live Act	Won

== British Music Experience (BME) ==
In 2017 The British Music Experience management, inducting Iron Maiden’s iconic Eddie as a historical artifact and music memorabilia is a tribute to the "band's significance in the history of British music.

Year	Nominee / work	Award	Result
2017	Eddie Head	BME Exposition	Inducted

== Burrn! ==
Burrn! awards are annual Japanese heavy metal awards which Iron Maiden cleaned up in 2000 and 2006.

Year	Nominee / work	Award	Result
2000	Iron Maiden	Best Group	Won
2000	Brave New World	Best Album	Won
2000	Brave New World	Best Cover Art	Won
2000	Iron Maiden	Live Performance In Japan	Won
2000	Steve Harris	Best Bassists	Won
2006	Iron Maiden	Best Group	Won
2006	A Matter of Life and Death	Album of the Year	Won
2006	A Matter of Life and Death	Best Cover Art	Won
2006	“Different World”	Song of the Year	Won
2006	Iron Maiden	Best live Performance	Won
2006	Bruce Dickinson	Best Vocalist	Won
2006	Steve Harris	Best Bassists	Won
2006	Steve Harris	Best Songwriter	Won

== Classic Rock Roll of Honour Awards ==
Since 2006 Iron Maiden were four times nominated and awarded by Classic Rock as a part of Classic Rock Roll of Honour Awards.

Year	Nominee / work	Award	Result
2006	A Matter of Life and Death	Album of the Year	Won
2006	Rod Smallwood	VIP Award	Won
2009	Iron Maiden	Band of the Year	Won
2012	Rod Smallwood	Classic Rock Roll of Honour Hall of Fame	Inducted
2015	The Book of Souls	Album of the Year	Won

== ECHO Award ==
Echo Music Prize (stylized as ECHO, German pronunciation: [ˈɛço]) was an accolade by the Deutsche Phono-Akademie [de], an association of recording companies in Germany to recognize outstanding achievement in the music industry. In 2009 Iron Maiden received an ECHO Award nomination for Best Live Band and became a winner. Two years later, the musicians were nominated again in Best International Artist category. In 2016 Iron Maiden won the award with The Book of Souls album as the Best Rock/Alternative Album of 2015.

Year	Nominee / work	Award	Result
2009	Iron Maiden	Best Live Artist	Won
2011	Iron Maiden	Best International Artist	Nominated
2016	Iron Maiden	Best Rock/Alternative Album	Won

== Eisner Awards ==
Eisner Award is an American honor named after Will Eisner, comics pioneer, screenwriter, and comic book artist. It is considered the most prestigious distinction in the world of comics. In 2024 comic book dedicated to Iron Maiden's classic album Piece of Mind received a nomination in the category of Best Publication Design.

Year	Nominee / work	Award	Result
2024	Iron Maiden: Piece of Mind (Z2)	Best Publication Design	Nominated

== Emma Gaala ==
The Emma Gaala is an annual music awards ceremony established in 1983 by the Suomen Ääni- ja kuvatallennetuottajat. Iron Maiden have received three awards.

Year	Nominee / work	Award	Result
2004	Iron Maiden	Yleisöäänestys – Vuoden ulkomainen artisti (The audience vote – for a foreign artist)	Won
2006	Iron Maiden	Yleisöäänestys – Vuoden ulkomainen artisti (The audience vote – for a foreign artist)	Won
2008	Iron Maiden	Best Live Artist	Won

== Finnish Metal Music Awards ==
The Finnish Metal Music Awards we’re an annual award show held in Helsinki, Iron Maiden won two awards in 2003.

Year	Nominee / work	Award	Result
2003	Dance of Death	International Album of the Year	Won
2003	Iron Maiden	International Band of the Year	Won

== Fonogram - Magyar Zenei Díjat ==
The Senjutsu album was nominated for Fonogram - Magyar Zenei Díjat, the Hungarian equivalent of the Grammy, in the category "Best Hard Rock / Metal Album".

Year	Nominee / work	Award	Result
2022	Senjutsu	Best Hard Rock/Metal Album	Nominated

== Grammy Awards ==
The annual Grammy Awards are presented by the National Academy of Recording Arts and Sciences. Iron Maiden have received one award from four nominations.

Year	Nominee / work	Award	Result
1994	"Fear of the Dark" (from A Real Live One)	Best Metal Performance	Nominated
2001	"The Wicker Man"	Best Metal Performance	Nominated
2011	"El Dorado"	Best Metal Performance	Won
2013	"Blood Brothers" (from En Vivo!)	Best Hard Rock/Metal Performance	Nominated

== Guinness World Records ==
The Guinness World Records is a British reference book published annually, listing world records both of human achievements and the extremes of the natural world. Iron Maiden have achieved two world records.

Year	Nominee / work	Award	Result
1988	Iron Maiden	Biggest PA System	Won
2017	Iron Maiden	Most songs featured in videogames by a metal artist	Won

== GMA Awards ==
Global Metal Apocalypse (GMA) is an international, independent society of heavy metal readers, journalists and musicians who support the metal music overseas. Iron Maiden's seventeenth studio album was awarded as "The Best Release of the 2021".

Year	Nominee / work	Award	Result
2021	Senjutsu	Release of the Year	Won

== Hollywood's RockWalk ==
Hollywood's RockWalk is a special sidewalk gallery that honors particular artists who have made a significant impact and contribution to the growth and evolution of rock 'n' roll, blues or R&B music. The gallery includes artists’ hand prints and special signatures.

Year	Nominee / work	Award	Result
2005	Iron Maiden	Hollywood's RockWalk	Inducted

== Iberian Festival Awards ==
The Iberian Festival Awards are given to the public vote winners in multiple categories related to the live events in Spain. Iron Maiden have received one award in 2017.

Year	Nominee / work	Award	Result
2017	Iron Maiden (Resurrection Festival)	Best International Live Performance	Won

== Ivor Novello Awards ==
The Ivor Novello Awards are presented annually in London by the British Academy of Composers and Songwriters. Iron Maiden have received one award.

Year	Nominee / work	Award	Result
2001	Iron Maiden	International Achievement	Won

== IFPI Finland Award ==
Two Sales Recognition Awards from Finland. In 2005 band's record sales trespassed half a million copies. In 2010 Iron Maiden's records were sold in over 750,000 copies.

Year	Nominee / work	Award	Result
2005	Iron Maiden	Sales Recognition Award	Won
2010	Iron Maiden	Sales Recognition Award	Won

== Juno Awards ==
The Juno Awards are presented by the Canadian Academy of Recording Arts and Sciences. Iron Maiden have received one award.

Year	Nominee / work	Award	Result
2010	Iron Maiden: Flight 666	Music DVD of the Year	Won

== Kerrang! Awards ==
The Kerrang! Awards is an annual awards ceremony held by Kerrang!, a British rock magazine. Iron Maiden have received seven awards from nine nominations.

Year	Nominee / work	Award	Result
1994	Steve Harris	Best Bassist Ever	Won
1995	Steve Harris	Kreativity Award	Won
2003	Iron Maiden	Best Live Act	Nominated
2005	Iron Maiden	Kerrang! Hall of Fame	Inducted
2008	Iron Maiden	Kerrang! Icon	Won
2012	Iron Maiden	Best British Band	Nominated
2013	Iron Maiden	Kerrang! Inspiration	Won
2016	Iron Maiden	Kerrang! Legend	Won
2018	Iron Maiden	Best Live Act	Won

== Loudwire Awards ==
Loudwire is an American hard rock and heavy metal online magazine. Annual Loudwire Awards were given to the public vote winners in multiple categories. Maiden have received three awards from nine nominations.

Year	Nominee / work	Award	Result
2015	The Book of Souls	Metal Album of the Year	Nominated
2015	'Speed of Light'	Metal Song of the Year	Nominated
2015	Iron Maiden	Metal Band of the Year	Nominated
2015	Bruce Dickinson	Best Vocalist	Nominated
2015	Bruce Dickinson	Rock Titan of the Year	Nominated
2015	Nicko McBrain	Best Drummer	Nominated
2017	Iron Maiden	Best Live Act	Won
2017	Iron Maiden	UK Band	Won
2017	Steve Harris	Bassist of the Year	Won

== Madame Tussaud’s Rock Circus ==
Madame Tussaud's Rock Circus was a walk-through exhibition built to celebrate the illustrious history of popular music, featuring many figures recreated in wax and memorabilia. Rock Circus was located on the top four floors of the London Pavilion based in London at Piccadilly Circus. In 1996 Iron Maiden were commemorated among the artists featured as waxworks, in video, and their historical memorabilia. Additionally, members of the band put their palms into the "Wall of Hands", a wall-mounted collection of palm imprint casts of various rock stars.

Year	Nominee / work	Award	Result
1996	Iron Maiden/ memorabilia	Rock Circus Exhibit	Inducted

== Metal Hall of Fame ==
Metal Hall of Fame honorary induction is an annual ceremony in the USA. The ex-Iron Maiden members (Paul Di'Anno, Blaze Bayley, Derek Riggs) received their first nominations and were inducted in April 2021.

Year	Nominee / work	Award	Result
2021	Paul Di'Anno (ex-Iron Maiden)	Metal Hall of Fame	Inducted
2021	Blaze Bayley (ex-Iron Maiden)	Metal Hall of Fame	Inducted
2021	Derek Riggs	Metal Hall of Fame	Inducted

== Metal Across America Exhibit ==
The Metal Across America Exhibit is a traveling exhibit hosted by the Metal Hall of Fame featuring memorabilia from many prominent metal artists.

Year	Nominee / work	Award	Result
2023	Original album artwork	Metal Across America Exhibit	Inducted
2024	Bruce Dickinson Jacket	Metal Across America Exhibit	Inducted

== Metal Hammer Golden Gods Awards ==
The Metal Hammer Golden Gods Awards is an annual awards ceremony held by Metal Hammer, a British heavy metal magazine. Iron Maiden have received fourteen awards from twenty two nominations at the Metal Hammer Golden Gods Awards and Paneuropean Metal Awards combined.

Year	Nominee / work	Award	Result
1991	Iron Maiden	The Greatest Metal Band Ever	Won
1991	Steve Harris	Best Bassist Ever	Won
1991	Bruce Dickinson	Best Frontman Ever	Won
1991	Eddie the Head	Heavy Metal Icon	Won
1991	Nicko McBrain	Best Drummer	Nominated
1991	Dave Murray	Best Drummer	Nominated
2004	Iron Maiden	Best UK Act	Won
2006	Nicko McBrain	Best Drummer	Nominated
2006	Eddie the Head	Icon	Nominated
2007	Iron Maiden	Best UK Band	Nominated
2007	Janick Gers, Adrian Smith, Dave Murray	Riff Lord	Nominated
2007	A Matter of Life and Death	Album of the Year	Nominated
2008	Iron Maiden	Best UK Band	Won
2008	Eddie the Head	Icon Award	Won
2009	Iron Maiden	Best UK Band	Won
2009	Iron Maiden	Golden God	Won
2011	Iron Maiden	Best UK Band	Won
2012	Iron Maiden's UK Tour	Best Event	Won
2014	Iron Maiden	Best UK Band	Won
2016	The Book of Souls	Best Album	Won
2017	Iron Maiden: Legacy of the Beast	Best Game	Won

== Metal Hammer Germany Awards ==
The Metal Hammer Awards Germany is a yearly heavy metal award show hosted by the Metal Hammer Germany. Iron Maiden has won two awards.

Year	Nominee / work	Award	Result
2009	Iron Maiden	Best International Band	Won
2010	Iron Maiden	Best Live Band	Won
2017	Iron Maiden	Best Live Band	Nominated
2018	Bruce Dickinson	Legend award	Nominated

== Metal Storm Awards ==
Metal Storm Awards is an annual awards ceremony held by Metal Storm, an Estonia-based heavy metal webzine. Since 2005 Iron Maiden received eight awards from ten nominations in multiple categories.

Year	Nominee / work	Award	Result
2005	EggFest Sharon Osbourne vs. Iron Maiden	Best Drama Award	Won
2006	A Matter of Life and Death	Best Heavy Metal Album Award	Won
2009	Iron Maiden: Flight 666	Best DVD Award	Won
2010	Iron Maiden: Flight 666	Best DVD of Decade Award	Won
2010	"The Final Frontier"	Best Video Award	Won
2021	"The Writing on the Wall"	Best Video Award	Won
2021	Senjutsu	Heavy/Melodic Metal Album Award	Won
2021	Senjutsu	The Biggest Letdown Award	Won

== Metal Edge Readers Choice ==
The Metal Edge Readers choice was a yearly awards poll held by Metal Edge Iron Maiden has won 3 awards off of 9 nominations.

Year	Nominee / work	Award	Result
2000	Brave New World	Album Cover of the Year	Won
2000	Iron Maiden	Comeback of the Year	Won
2000	Bruce Dickinson	Vocalist of the Year	Nominated
2000	Iron Maiden	Band of the Year	Nominated
2000	Steve Harris	Bassist of the Year	Nominated
2000	Brave New World	Album of the Year	Nominated
2000	Iron Maiden	Live performance of the Year	Nominated
2000	The Brave New World tour	Tour of the Year	Nominated
2004	The History of Iron Maiden – Part 1: The Early Days	Home Video/DVD of the Year.	Won

== Modern Drummer Hall of Fame ==
The Modern Drummer Readers Poll Hall of Fame inducts legendary drummers each year, the Hall of Fame is part of the magazine's annual Readers Poll, which also recognizes excellence in various other drumming categories. Nicko McBrain was the sole inductee in 2020.

Year	Nominee / work	Award	Result
2020	Nicko McBrain	Metal Drummer Hall of Fame	Inducted

== München Olympiapark Walk of Stars ==
On 2 August 2023, Iron Maiden were inducted into the Olympiapark Walk of Stars in Munich, Germany. The Walk of Stars is dedicated to some of the most important phenomenons representing entertainment, music and sport.

Year	Nominee / work	Award	Result
2023	Iron Maiden	München Olympiapark Walk of Stars	Inducted

== MTV Video Music Awards Japan ==
The MTV Video Music Awards Japan were established in 2002 and presented by MTV Japan, and are the Japanese version of the MTV Video Music Awards.

Year	Nominee / work	Award	Result
2016	"Speed of Light"	Best Metal Video	Nominated

== Music Week UK Awards ==
In 2003, the band's management (Rod Smallwood and Andy Taylor) and Steve Harris were awarded Music Week's Strat Award for their contribution to the British Music Industry.

Year	Nominee / work	Award	Result
2003	Steve Harris, Andy Taylor, Rod Smallwood	Strat Award for Contribution to Music Industry	Won

== Order of the British Empire (OBE) ==
The Most Excellent Order of the British Empire is a British order of chivalry and is one of the most prestigious recognitions in the world. In June 2026, the band's manager, Rod Smallwood, received the "Order of the British Empire" (OBE). This recognition completed the band's 50th Anniversary celebrations.

Year	Nominee / work	Award	Result
2026	Rod Smallwood as Iron Maiden manager	Order of the British Empire (OBE)	Honored

== Planet Rock Awards (The Rocks) ==
The band has also received ten awards from fourteen nominations at the Planet Rock Awards (The ROCKS). They're nominated and awarded in 2016, 2017, 2018, 2019, 2021, and 2022 in multiple categories. In 2022 Iron Maiden became the most awarded band among the other artists. The band was awarded again in 2023.

Year	Nominee / work	Award	Result
2016	The Book of Souls	Best International Album	Won
2016	"Speed of Light"	Best British Single	Won
2016	Iron Maiden	Best British Band	Nominated
2017	Iron Maiden	Best British Band	Won
2018	Iron Maiden	Band of the Year	Won
2019	Iron Maiden	Best Live Band	Won
2019	Iron Maiden	Best British Band	Won
2021	Iron Maiden	Greatest Live Band of All Time	Won
2021	Iron Maiden	Euros of Rock Champions	Won
2022	"The Writing on the Wall"	Best Single	3rd
2022	Senjutsu	Best Album	2nd
2022	Iron Maiden	Best British Band	Won
2022	Iron Maiden	Greatest Metal Band of All Time	Won
2022	Iron Maiden	The Rock World Championship	3rd
2023	Iron Maiden	Best British Band	Won
2023	Somewhere in Time	Best Cover Art Ever	3rd

== Polish Antyradio Awards ==
Antyradio is a Polish radio network broadcasting all genres of rock music, although mostly broadcasting contemporary rock hits. Iron Maiden were eight times nominated and awarded in different categories.

Year	Nominee / work	Award	Result
2016	The Book of Souls	Album of the Year	Won
2016	Iron Maiden	Band of the Year	Won
2016	Bruce Dickinson	Vocalist of the Year	Won
2019	Iron Maiden	Best Live Act	Won
2021	Bruce Dickinson	Vocalist of the Year	Won
2022	Bruce Dickinson	Vocalist of the Year	Won
2022	Iron Maiden	Band of the Year	Won
2022	Senjutsu	Album of the Year	Won

== Revolver Golden Gods Awards ==
The Revolver Golden Gods Awards are awarded annually by the American music magazine Revolver. Iron Maiden received 6 nominations and 1 win.

Year	Nominee / work	Award	Result
2011	Bruce Dickinson	Revolver Magazine's 100 Greatest Living Rock Stars 2011	Won
2011	Iron Maiden	Best Live Band	Nominated
2011	Bruce Dickinson	Best Vocalist	Nominated
2011	Nicko McBrian	Best Drummer	Nominated
2011	Janick Gers, Dave Murray, and Adrian Smith of Iron Maiden	Best Guitarst	Nominated
2013	Steve Harris	Best Bassist	Nominated

== Rockbjörnen ==
Rockbjörnen is an annual awards ceremony which takes place in Sweden. Iron Maiden have received one award.

Year	Nominee / work	Award	Result
2011	Iron Maiden	Best Hard Rock Live Act	Won

== Rock and Roll Hall of Fame ==
Rock and Roll Hall of Fame honorary induction is an annual ceremony in the United States. Iron Maiden received the very first nomination in February 2021, 41 years after their eponymous debut album was published. The second nomination they received was on 1 February 2023. On 25 February 2026 the band received their third nomination. On 13 April they got inducted as the Performers. Iron Maiden's souvenirs are the part of Rock and Roll Hall of Fame permanent exhibition dedicated to heavy metal music.

Year	Nominee / work	Award	Result
2017	Iron Maiden	R'n'R HoF Metal Exhibition	Inducted
2021	Iron Maiden	Hall of Fame	Nominated
2023	Iron Maiden	Hall of Fame	Nominated
2026	Iron Maiden	Hall of Fame	Inducted

== Rock Antenne Hall of Fame ==
The Rock Antenne Hall of Fame in Germany is the European answer to the Rock and Roll Hall of Fame. The most deserving of recognition in rock music bands and soloed musicians have been inducted into the Rock Antenne Hall of Fame since its inception in 2019. Iron Maiden were inducted as a band, and in 2022, four years later, Bruce Dickinson was inducted as a vocalist.

Year	Nominee / work	Award	Result
2022	Iron Maiden	Hall of Fame	Inducted
2026	Bruce Dickinson (Iron Maiden)	Hall of Fame	Inducted

== Rolling Stone ==
The American magazine Rolling Stone awarded the band's seventeenth studio album "Senjutsu" with the title of Best Metal Album of 2021.

Year	Nominee / work	Award	Result
2021	Senjutsu	Best Metal Album of 2021	Won

== Rock Hard ==
The German magazine Rock Hard holds a yearly readers poll, Iron Maiden’s seventeenth studio album “Senjutsu” won Album of the Year in 2021.

Year	Nominee / work	Award	Result
2021	Senjutsu	Album of the Year	Won

== The Rock in Rio Wall of Fame ==
The Rock in Rio "Wall of Fame" is an attraction at the festival's "City of Rock" that honors major artists with handprints, similar to the Hollywood Walk of Fame. In 2017, Iron Maiden pressed their hands into a concrete slab for the wall, a common practice to commemorate legendary musicians who have performed at the event.

Year	Work / Nominee	Award	Result
2017	Iron Maiden	Rock in Rio Hall of Fame	Inducted

== Silver Clef Awards ==
Nordoff-Robbins is a UK charity providing music therapy. The band was awarded for the first time in 2024 when the musicians received the Special Achievement Award. Nordoff-Robbins holds the annual Silver Clef Awards, from which Iron Maiden have received Silver Clef Award in 2015 for an Outstanding Contribution to UK Music.

Year	Nominee / work	Award	Result
2004	Iron Maiden	Special Achievement Award	Won
2015	Iron Maiden	02 Silver Clef Award 2015	Won

== Sklizen Awards ==
Sklizen Awards are the honors established by Czech Spark Magazine for the "Best Albums of the Year". Iron Maiden were awarded two times so far.

Year	Nominee / work	Award	Result
2016	The Book of Souls	Best Album of 2015	Won
2022	Senjutsu	Best Album of 2021	Won

== SeeYouSound Music Festival Awards ==
The para-documentary movie entitled "Night of the Beast" was dedicated to Columbian Iron Maiden fans. The movie won the "Best Music Para–Documentary Award" at the SeeYouSound Music Festival Awards 2022.

Year	Nominee / work	Award	Result
2022	“Night of the Beast”	Best Music Para – Documentary Award	Won

== Spanish Music Awards ==
Back in the '80s Spanish Music Awards were given to domestic and international artists in many categories. In February 1984 Iron Maiden's Piece of Mind album was awarded as the "Best Rock Album".

Year	Nominee / work	Award	Result
1984	Piece of Mind	Best Rock Album	Won

== Spanish Premios Odeon Awards ==
Spanish Premios Odeón is considered the Spanish equivalent of the Grammy Awards. Iron Maiden's Senjutsu album received a nomination in the category "International Album of the Year".

Year	Nominee / work	Award	Result
2022	Senjutsu	International Album of the Year	Nominated

== Sweden Rock Award ==
In 2011 Iron Maiden were awarded by Sweden Rock Magazine for the best album of the decade (2000 – 2009) which was A Matter of Life and Death originally released in 2006.

Year	Nominee / work	Award	Result
2011	A Matter of Life and Death	Album of the Decade	Won

== SXSW Film Festival Award ==
South by Southwest (SXSW) is a cyclical cultural event consisting of film and music festivals and technology conferences organized in Austin, USA. In 2009 Iron Maiden documentary movie Flight 666 was awarded with "24 Beats Per Second Award" by the festival's audience.

Year	Nominee / work	Award	Result
2009	Iron Maiden: Flight 666	24 Beats Per Audience Second Award	Won

== The BPI Hall of Fame ==
In 2011 Iron Maiden were inducted into the BPI Hall of Fame in the UK.

Year	Nominee / work	Award	Result
2011	Iron Maiden	BPI Hall of Fame	Inducted

== The Pollstar Awards ==
Pollstar was founded in 1981, in Freson/CA as a trade publication that covers the concert industry in the United States and internationally. Iron Maiden and their agents were multiple nominated for Pollstar Awards. In November 2026, Pollstar named Rod Smallwood an Impact International UK/Euro Honoree. The recognition celebrates innovative and influential leaders driving creativity, growth, and impact across the live entertainment industry in the UK and Europe.

Year	Nominee / work	Award	Result
2009	Somewhere Back in Time World Tour	Best Rock Tour	Nominated
2014	Maiden England World Tour	Best Rock Tour	Nominated
2019	Iron Maiden	Best Alternative Artist	Nominated
2020	Legacy of the Beast World Tour	Best Rock Tour	Nominated
2023	Iron Maiden	The Per Cap Award	Nominated
2026	Rod Smallwood (Iron Maiden manager)	Impact International UK/Euro Honoree	Won

== TOP.HR Music Award ==
TOP.HR Music Award is the most prestigious music award in Croatia, described as the local equivalent of the Grammy Award. In 2022 Iron Maiden studio album Senjutsu was awarded as a Bestselling International Album of the Year.

Year	Nominee / work	Award	Result
2022	Senjutsu	Bestselling International Album	Won

== TWIPY Awards ==
Iron Maiden’s game called "Legacy of the Beast" was awarded in five categories of TWIPY Awards in 2018.

Year	Nominee / work	Award	Result
2018	Legacy of the Beast	Game of the Year	Won
2018	Legacy of the Beast	Best Gameplay and Layout	Won
2018	Legacy of the Beast	Best Pinball	Won
2018	Legacy of the Beast	Best Soundtrack and Effects	Won

== UK Music Video Awards ==
The UK Music Video Awards is an annual celebration of creativity, technical excellence and innovation in music video and moving image for music.

Year	Nominee / work	Award	Result
2021	"The Writing on the Wall"	Best Animation in a Video	Nominated

== Wacken Hall & Wall of Fame ==
In 2016 Iron Maiden were inducted into Wacken Open Air Headliners Wall of Fame. Since 2018 band mascot called Eddie the Head became a part of permanent exhibition of Wacken Hall of Fame.

Year	Nominee / work	Award	Result
2016	Iron Maiden	Wacken Wall of Fame	Inducted
2018	Eddie the Head	Wacken Hall of Fame	Inducted

== Žebřík Music Awards ==
Žebřík Music Awards are the most popular music awards established in the Czech Republic in 1992. The three finalists (TOP 3) in each category are selected as the actual prize winners. Particular musicians and Iron Maiden as the band were 61 times nominated to Žebřík Music Awards in the last 32 years. They were the winners (Top 3 finalists) 23 times so far. In 2022 their seventeenth studio album was nominated to Czech's Žebřík Music Awards in categories: "International Album of the Year", "International Band of the Year" and "Video of the Year".

Year	Nominee / work	Award	Result
1992	Iron Maiden	Best International Band	Nominated
1992	Fear of the Dark	Best International Album	Nominated
1992	"Be Quick or Be Dead"	Best International Video	Nominated
1992	Bruce Dickinson	Best International Singer	Nominated
1992	Steve Harris	Best International Musician	1st
1993	Iron Maiden	Best International Band	Nominated
1993	"Fear of the Dark - Live"	Best International Video	Nominated
1993	Bruce Dickinson	Best International Singer	Nominated
1993	Nicko McBrain	Best International Drummer	Nominated
1993	Iron Maiden	Best International Průser	1st
1993	Iron Maiden	Best International Show	2nd
1993	Bruce Dickinson	Best International Persona	Nominated
1993	Steve Harris	Best International Musician	2nd
1994	"Tears of the Dragon"	Best International Song	1st
1994	"Tears of the Dragon"	Best International Video	1st
1994	Bruce Dickinson	Best International Singer	1st
1994	Balls to Picasso	Best International Album	1st
1994	Iron Maiden	Best International Průser	Nominated
1994	Bruce Dickinson	Best International Persona	1st
1994	Steve Harris	Best International Musician	Nominated
1995	Iron Maiden	Best International Band	Nominated
1995	The X-Factor	Best International Album	Nominated
1995	"Man on the Edge"	Best International Song	3rd
1995	"Man on the Edge"	Best International Video	Nominated
1995	Bruce Dickinson	Best International Singer	2nd
1995	Iron Maiden	Best International Průser	1st
1995	Iron Maiden	Best International Surprise	2nd
1995	Iron Maiden	Best International Show	2nd
1995	Nicko McBrain	Best International Drummer	Nominated
1995	Steve Harris	Best International Musician	Nominated
1995	Bruce Dickinson	Best International Persona	3rd
1996	Iron Maiden	Best International Band	Nominated
1996	Bruce Dickinson	Best International Singer	Nominated
1996	Iron Maiden	Best International Průser	1st
1996	Iron Maiden	Best International Surprise	2nd
1996	Iron Maiden	Best International Show	2nd
1996	Steve Harris	Best International Musician	Nominated
1996	Bruce Dickinson	Best International Persona	Nominated
1997	Bruce Dickinson	Best International Singer	Nominated
1999	Iron Maiden	Best International Surprise	Nominated
2000	Iron Maiden	Best International Band	Nominated
2000	Bruce Dickinson	Best International Singer	Nominated
2000	Brave New World	Best International Album	Nominated
2000	"The Wicker Man"	Best International Song	Nominated
2000	"The Wicker Man"	Best International Video	Nominated
2006	Iron Maiden	Best International Band	Nominated
2006	Bruce Dickinson	Best International Singer	Nominated
2006	A Matter of Life and Death	Best International Album	Nominated
2006	"The Different World"	Best International Video	Nominated
2008	Bruce Dickinson	Best International Singer	Nominated
2008	"Live After Death"	Best International DVD	Nominated
2009	"Flight 666"	Best International DVD	3rd
2010	Iron Maiden	Best International Band	Nominated
2010	Bruce Dickinson	Best International Singer	Nominated
2010	The Final Frontier	Best International Album	Nominated
2010	"The Final Frontier"	Best International Video	Nominated
2017	Bruce Dickinson	Best International Singer	Nominated
2022	Iron Maiden	Best International Band	Nominated
2022	Bruce Dickinson	Best International Singer	3rd
2022	Senjutsu	Best International Album	1st
2022	"The Writing on the Wall"	Best International Video	3rd
2024	Iron Maiden, Praha O2 Arena	Best International Show	1st
