= Ian Gillan (disambiguation) =

Ian Gillan may refer to:

- Ian Gillan (born 1945), musician most famously with Deep Purple
- Ian Gillan Band, band fronted by Ian Gillan
- Ian Gillan (football coach), Scottish-born Australian soccer coach
- Gillan (band), band fronted by Ian Gillan
- Ian Gillan, Tony Iommi & Friends, also known as WhoCares, a musical project co-founded by Ian Gillan and Tony Iommi
  - Ian Gillan & Tony Iommi: WhoCares, a 2012 album by WhoCares
