= Out of My Mind / Holy Water =

Single by WhoCares (Ian Gillan, Tony Iommi & Friends)

from the album Ian Gillan & Tony Iommi: WhoCares
- Released: 24 May 2011 (Europe); 27 June 2011 (US)
- Recorded: 2011
- Genre: Heavy metal
- Label: Ear Music (Europe); Eagle Rock Entertainment (US)

Music video
- "Out of My Mind" on YouTube

Music video
- "Holy Water" on YouTube

"Out of My Mind" / "Holy Water" is a fund-raising two-track CD single from the supergroup WhoCares, a Tony Iommi and Ian Gillan collaboration, a direct continuation of the Rock Aid Armenia project. The CD contains the single "Out of My Mind" and the song "Holy Water" with the latter using the traditional Armenian instrument, the duduk by two Armenian musicians Arshak Sahakyan and Ara Gevorgyan. Both tracks of the CD were recorded at SARM Studios in Notting Hill, London.

The sale of the CD was to raise money to rebuild a music school in Gyumri, Armenia after the destruction of the city by the 1988 earthquake in Armenia and to buy musical instruments for the school. The CD was released on May 6, 2011 by Ear Music / Edel.

The recordings also appear on the WhoCares 2-CD album Ian Gillan & Tony Iommi: WhoCares, released in July 2012.

== "Out of My Mind" ==
"Out of My Mind" was co-written by Ian Gillan and Tony Iommi.

Credits

- Vocals – Ian Gillan
- Guitar – Tony Iommi
- Guitar – Mikko "Linde" Lindström
- Bass – Jason Newsted
- Drums – Nicko McBrain
- Keyboards – Jon Lord

== Holy Water ==
"Holy Water", the second song was co-written by Ian Gillan and Steve Morris.

Credits

- Vocals – Ian Gillan
- Guitar – Tony Iommi, Steve Morris and Michael Lee Jackson
- Bass – Rodney Appleby
- Drums – Randy Clarke
- Keyboards – Jesse O'Brien
- Duduk – Arshak Sahakyan
- Duduk and keyboards – Ara Gevorgyan

== Further credits ==
- Artwork – Antje Warnecke
- Cover [Concept] – Max Vaccaro
- Engineer, Engineer [Assistant] – Mike Exeter (track 1)
- Liner Notes – Ian Gillan, Tony Iommi
- Mastered by – Dick Beetham
- Mixed by – Mike Exeter, Tony Iommi

== Documentary: Picture of Home ==
The two-track CD release also includes a 30-minute documentary, Picture of Home shot by Bernie Zelvis and Christina Rowatt in which Ian Gillan recalls his visits to Armenia after the 1988 earthquake.

The release also contains a video for "Out of My Mind".

== Track list ==
Downloads

1. "Out of My Mind" (5:18)
2. "Holy Water" (7:01)

Deluxe CD single

1. "Out of My Mind" (5:18)
2. "Holy Water" (7:01)
3. Video music for "Out of My Mind"
4. Video – Picture of Home documentary (30:00)

7" vinyl single (Numbered limited edition of 1000 copies only worldwide)

- Side A: "Out of My Mind" (5:18)
- Side B: "Holy Water" (7:01)

== Charts ==
The single "Out of My Mind" reached No. 86 on the German Singles Chart.

The album Ian Gillan & Tony Iommi: WhoCares had good sales because of the big names appearing on the album. It reached No. 26 on the Swedish Albums Chart and No. 29 on the Norwegian Albums Chart in the week ending 27 July 2012.

Chart (2011–2012)	Peak position
German Singles Chart	86
