= The Future Past World Tour =

2023–24 concert tour by Iron Maiden

- Tour by Iron Maiden
- Location: Asia; Europe; North America; Oceania; South America
- Associated albums: Somewhere in Time; Senjutsu
- Start date: 28 May 2023
- End date: 7 December 2024
- Legs: 6
- No. of shows: 81

Iron Maiden concert chronology
- Legacy of the Beast World Tour (2018–2022); The Future Past World Tour (2023–2024); Run for Your Lives World Tour (2025–2027)

The Future Past World Tour was a concert tour by the English heavy metal band Iron Maiden, in support of their seventeenth studio album Senjutsu, which is part of their tour's theme, along with their 1986 album Somewhere in Time. Following 2005's Eddie Rips Up the World Tour, 2008–2009's Somewhere Back in Time World Tour and the Maiden England World Tour in 2012–2014, this is the band's fourth concert tour to focus on a particular part of their history. The tour featured "Alexander the Great", which was performed for the first time. The tour was set to continue into 2024. The tour started on 28 May 2023 in Ljubljana and concluded on 7 December 2024 in Sao Paulo. It was the final concert tour to feature Nicko McBrain before his retirement from touring, and the band announced it shortly before the concert at São Paulo, Brazil, which is the final date of the tour.

== Background ==
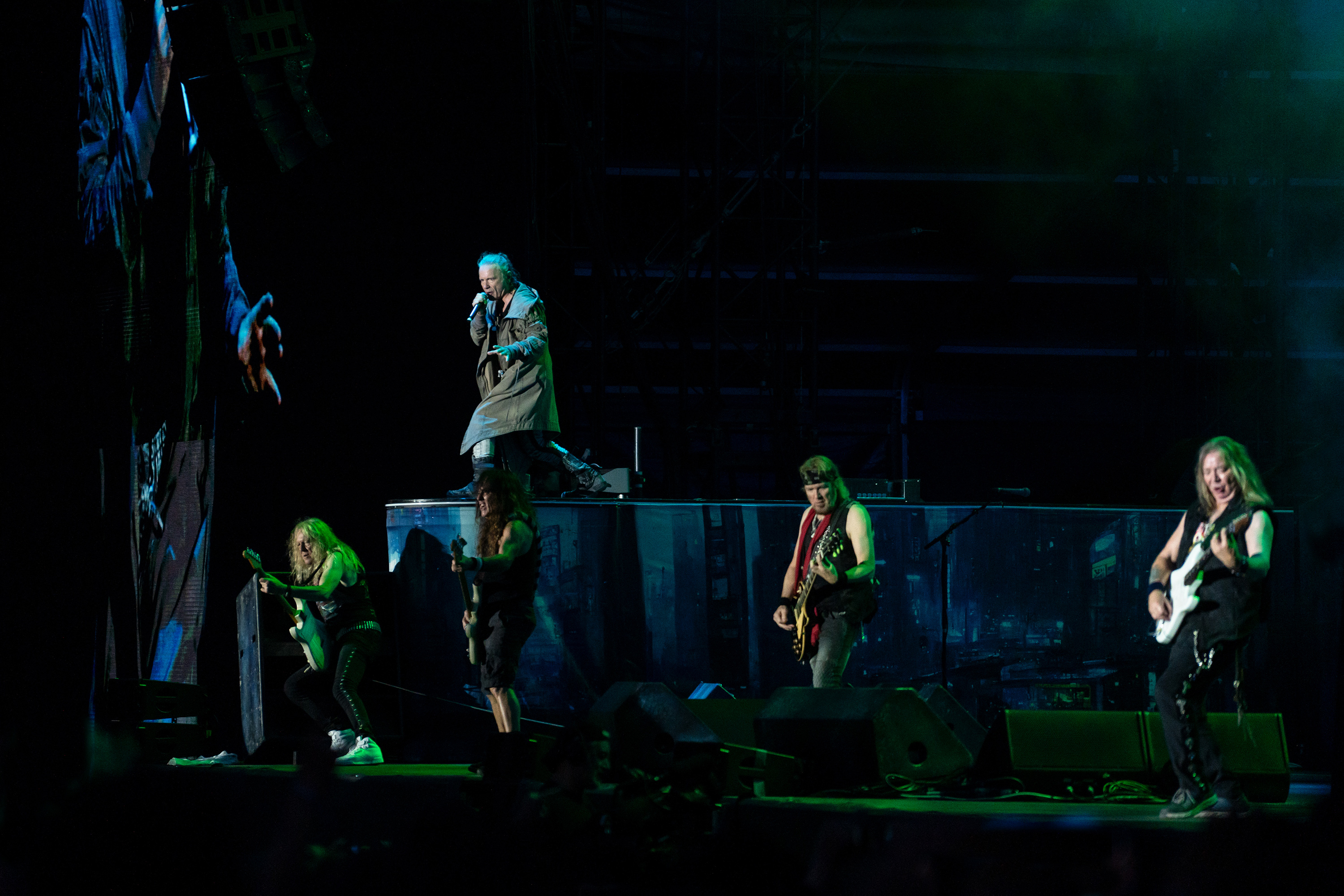
Iron Maiden performing at Hellfest in 2023

All thirty-three shows of the European leg were commercial and artistic successes with more than 750,000 fans in attendance. Mostly indoor events attracted record numbers of spectators, and according to critics, the band showed its best form in many years. The 2023 leg of the tour ended with the group's performance at the Wacken Open Air festival, which they headlined for the fourth time in their career. Drummer Nicko McBrain participated in the tour after suffering a stroke in January 2023. On 6 October, the band performed at Power Trip, which was attended by 100,000 people and became their largest performance as a festival headliner in the United States. In mid-October, shows planned for 2024 were announced. Already at the pre-sale stage, a second concert at the Estadio Nacional in Santiago was added. In a short period, over 100,000 tickets were sold for both concerts combined, setting another record in the history of the band. The first concert in Bogota in 13 years at the El Campin stadium was sold out at the pre-sale stage in 20 minutes. The band broke all previous records of ticket sales for Colombian concerts by a foreign artist, set by icons such as The Rolling Stones, Madonna, The Weekend, Ed Sheeran, and Coldplay.

The first of two concerts at the Allianz Parque stadium in São Paulo was sold out in two minutes, the band set a sales record for a group representing heavy rock music. In Argentina, over 50,000 tickets for a stadium concert in Buenos Aires were sold in three hours. it's happened for the first time in the band’s career to sell out a show in Argentina so quickly. 44 shows scheduled for 2024 attracted more than one million people across Asia, Oceania and both Americas. The band performed 81 shows for almost two million fans throughout the tour.

The visual setting of the stage referred to the cyberpunk style associated with the classic sci-fi movie "Blade Runner". The overall design brought to mind a dystopian city of the future, topped with ramps of lights arranged in the shape of a pyramid. For the first time, the band used additional screens placed symmetrically deep inside the stage to present visualizations and music videos, deepening the three-dimensional effect.

== Opening acts ==
=== 2023 ===
- The Raven Age (28–31 May, 4–21 June, 8–25 July, 29–31 July)
- Lord of the Lost (3 June, 24 June – 7 July, 26 July, 1 August)
- Atreyu (28 September – 2 October)

=== 2024 ===
- Killswitch Engage (1–16 September)
- The Hu (4 October - 17 November)
- Disturbed (20 November)
- Ágora (20 November)
- Krönös (24 November)
- Dogma (27–28 November)
- Malón (1, 2 December)
- Volbeat (6-7 December)

== Set list ==
- Intro: "End Titles" from Blade Runner (by Vangelis)
1. "Caught Somewhere in Time"
2. "Stranger in a Strange Land"
3. "The Writing on the Wall"
4. "Days of Future Past"
5. "The Time Machine"
6. "The Prisoner"
7. "Death of the Celts"
8. "Can I Play with Madness"
9. "Heaven Can Wait"
10. "Alexander the Great"
11. "Fear of the Dark"
12. "Iron Maiden"

Encore

13. "Hell on Earth"
14. "The Trooper"
15. "Wasted Years"

== Tour dates ==
List of 2023 concerts
| Date | City | Country | Venue |
|---|---|---|---|
| 28 May 2023 | Ljubljana | Slovenia | Arena Stozice |
| 30 May 2023 | Prague | Czech Republic | O_{2} Arena |
| 31 May 2023 | Prague | Czech Republic | O_{2} Arena |
| 3 June 2023 | Tampere | Finland | Nokia Arena |
| 4 June 2023 | Tampere | Finland | Nokia Arena |
| 7 June 2023 | Bergen | Norway | Koengen |
| 9 June 2023 (Note: The performance on 9 June 2023 was a part of Sweden Rock Festival.) | Norje | Sweden | Norje Havsbad |
| 11 June 2023 | Leipzig | Germany | Quarterback Immobilien Arena |
| 13 June 2023 | Kraków | Poland | Tauron Arena |
| 14 June 2023 | Kraków | Poland | Tauron Arena |
| 17 June 2023 (Note: The performance on 17 June 2023 was a part of Hellfest.) | Clisson | France | Val de Moine |
| 19 June 2023 | Zürich | Switzerland | Hallenstadion |
| 21 June 2023 | Hanover | Germany | ZAG-Arena |
| 24 June 2023 | Dublin | Ireland | 3Arena |
| 26 June 2023 | Glasgow | Scotland | OVO Hydro |
| 28 June 2023 | Leeds | England | First Direct Arena |
| 30 June 2023 | Manchester | England | AO Arena |
| 3 July 2023 | Nottingham | England | Motorpoint Arena |
| 4 July 2023 | Birmingham | England | Utilita Arena Birmingham |
| 7 July 2023 | London | England | The O_{2} Arena |
| 8 July 2023 | London | England | The O_{2} Arena |
| 11 July 2023 | Amsterdam | Netherlands | Ziggo Dome |
| 13 July 2023 | Antwerp | Belgium | Sportpaleis |
| 15 July 2023 (Note: The performance on 15 July 2023 was a part of the festival: The Return of the Gods.) | Milan | Italy | Ippodromo di San Siro |
| 18 July 2023 | Barcelona | Spain | Palau Sant Jordi |
| 20 July 2023 | Murcia | Spain | Estadio Nueva Condomina |
| 22 July 2023 | Bilbao | Spain | Bizkaia Arena |
| 25 July 2023 | Dortmund | Germany | Westfalenhallen |
| 26 July 2023 | Dortmund | Germany | Westfalenhallen |
| 29 July 2023 | Frankfurt | Germany | Festhalle |
| 31 July 2023 | Munich | Germany | Olympiahalle |
| 1 August 2023 | Munich | Germany | Olympiahalle |
| 4 August 2023 (Note: The performance on 4 August 2023 was a part of Wacken Open Air.) | Wacken | Germany | Hauptstrasse |
| 28 September 2023 | Calgary | Canada | Scotiabank Saddledome |
| 30 September 2023 | Edmonton | Canada | Rogers Place |
| 2 October 2023 | Vancouver | Canada | Rogers Arena |
| 6 October 2023 (Note: The performance on 6 October 2023 was a part of Power Trip.) | Indio | United States | Empire Polo Club |

List of 2024 concerts
| Date | City | Country | Venue |
|---|---|---|---|
| 1 September 2024 | Perth | Australia | RAC Arena |
| 4 September 2024 | Adelaide | Australia | Adelaide Entertainment Centre |
| 6 September 2024 | Melbourne | Australia | Rod Laver Arena |
| 7 September 2024 | Melbourne | Australia | Rod Laver Arena |
| 10 September 2024 | Brisbane | Australia | Brisbane Entertainment Centre |
| 12 September 2024 | Sydney | Australia | Qudos Bank Arena |
| 13 September 2024 | Sydney | Australia | Qudos Bank Arena |
| 16 September 2024 | Auckland | New Zealand | Spark Arena |
| 22 September 2024 | Toyota | Japan | Sky Hall Toyota |
| 24 September 2024 | Osaka | Japan | Osaka-jō Hall |
| 26 September 2024 | Tokyo | Japan | Tokyo Garden Theater |
| 28 September 2024 | Yokohama | Japan | Pia Arena MM |
| 29 September 2024 | Yokohama | Japan | Pia Arena MM |
| 4 October 2024 | Chula Vista | United States | North Island Credit Union Amphitheatre |
| 5 October 2024 | Las Vegas | United States | Michelob Ultra Arena |
| 8 October 2024 | Inglewood | United States | Kia Forum |
| 9 October 2024 | Phoenix | United States | Footprint Center |
| 12 October 2024 (Note: The performance on 12 October 2024 was a part of Aftershock Festival.) | Sacramento | United States | Discovery Park |
| 14 October 2024 | Portland | United States | Moda Center |
| 16 October 2024 | Tacoma | United States | Tacoma Dome |
| 18 October 2024 | Salt Lake City | United States | Delta Center |
| 19 October 2024 | Denver | United States | Ball Arena |
| 22 October 2024 | Saint Paul | United States | Xcel Energy Center |
| 24 October 2024 | Rosemont | United States | Allstate Arena |
| 26 October 2024 | Toronto | Canada | Scotiabank Arena |
| 27 October 2024 | Quebec City | Canada | Videotron Centre |
| 30 October 2024 | Montreal | Canada | Bell Centre |
| 1 November 2024 | Philadelphia | United States | Wells Fargo Center |
| 2 November 2024 | Brooklyn | United States | Barclays Center |
| 6 November 2024 | Worcester | United States | DCU Center |
| 8 November 2024 | Pittsburgh | United States | PPG Paints Arena |
| 9 November 2024 | Newark | United States | Prudential Center |
| 12 November 2024 | Baltimore | United States | CFG Bank Arena |
| 13 November 2024 | Charlotte | United States | Spectrum Center |
| 16 November 2024 | Fort Worth | United States | Dickies Arena |
| 17 November 2024 | San Antonio | United States | Frost Bank Center |
| 20 November 2024 | Mexico City | México | Estadio GNP Seguros |
| 24 November 2024 | Bogotá | Colombia | Estadio El Campín |
| 27 November 2024 | Santiago | Chile | Estadio Nacional Julio Martínez Prádanos |
| 28 November 2024 | Santiago | Chile | Estadio Nacional Julio Martínez Prádanos |
| 1 December 2024 | Buenos Aires | Argentina | Estadio Tomás Adolfo Ducó |
| 2 December 2024 | Buenos Aires | Argentina | Movistar Arena |
| 6 December 2024 | São Paulo | Brazil | Allianz Parque |
| 7 December 2024 | São Paulo | Brazil | Allianz Parque |
