= Michael Lee Jackson =

American guitarist, photographer and attorney

Michael Lee Jackson is an American guitarist, photographer and attorney.

He was part of Ian Gillan's backing band on the Deep Purple frontman's US solo tour in August and September 2006. He also performed on guitar and acted as musical director for Gillan's CD/DVD Gillan's Inn (2006), Live in Anaheim also on CD/DVD (2008), and One Eye to Morocco (2009). He has been Gillan's creative manager for solo projects since approximately 2005. In 2010-11, Jackson scored and engineered the sound track to the indie feature film, The Bad Penny, directed by Todd Bellanca. Jackson also played guitar on "Holy Water" off the 2011 WhoCares project by Tony Iommi, Ian Gillan and friends, a project to raise funds for the rebuilding of a music school in Gyumri, Armenia. Jackson also contributed engineering and production on "Holy Water" and recorded Gillan's vocals for the "Out of My Mind / Holy Water" single from the Ian Gillan & Tony Iommi: WhoCares album.

He released a solo album, In a Heartbeat, in 2006 on which Gillan was credited for backing vocals, and Tommy Z contributed guitar work. The CD was recorded at Metalworks Studios in Mississauga, Ontario.

He also worked with Emerson, Lake & Palmer bassist/vocalist, Greg Lake, and Animal Planet on a record of ELP/King Crimson remakes. The record was fully recorded, but has not been released.

He was front man for the Buffalo, New York band Animal Planet a group that recorded a three CDs, including Toast, Wag!, and Dawn. Animal Planet, as well as his own Michael Lee Jackson Band have toured extensively overseas to entertain US troops.

He toured with 10,000 Maniacs in 1998-1999. He replaced Robert Buck when he temporarily left the band to work with the rock supergroup League of Blind Women.

Jackson is the son of Bruce Jackson, a professor at the University at Buffalo. Michael Lee Jackson is an attorney from Buffalo, New York with a practice concentrating on entertainment, contracts and general business. He is a graduate of State University of New York at Buffalo Law School. He clerked for civil rights lawyer, William Kunstler, while in school. He received the Thurgood Marshall Award for pro-bono representation of an indigent defendant in a death-penalty case.

Jackson is also a photographer specializing in portrait and landscape photography. Jackson was selected by the jury of the Echo Art Fair in Buffalo, New York to exhibit his work in the May 2016 event.

In the summer of 2016 Jackson completed work on the album Death By Sunshine, co-produced by Jackson and Nick Blagona. It is scheduled for a fall 2016 release.

Michael currently resides in southern California.
