= Jenny Darren =

British singer

- Also known as: Jennifer Angela Phillips (adopted)
- Born: Jennifer Harley; October 13, 1949 (age 77); Birmingham, Warwickshire, England
- Origin: Dudley, Worcestershire (now W. Midlands), England
- Genres: Rock, blues, jazz, Celtic, classical
- Occupations: Singer, lyricist, poet, writer
- Instruments: Voice, guitar
- Years active: 1962–present
- Labels: Philips/Fontana, Major Minor, Columbia, BUK, Decca, DJM, Angel Air, Seacrest Oy Green-Tree Nu Music Records
- Website: jennydarren.com

Jenny Darren is a British rock singer. She recorded the first version of "Heartbreaker" in 1978, which later was a hit for American singer Pat Benatar. Darren was part of "The dream of Olwen" by Second City Sound that entered the top 50 at number 43 in 1969.

== Early career ==
Darren was born Jennifer Harley in Birmingham, England, the adopted and only child of Maud Phillips and Leslie Phillips. She was raised in Dudley and attended The Sir Gilbert Claughton Grammar School. She wrote her first song "Why does it have to be with me" at the age of eleven, after which she joined her first band (her cousin George's ) "Johnny Dark and The Rocking Phantoms" at the age of thirteen.

During senior school, she gigged locally with a Blackheath group called "The Roving Saracens" as one of four singers with two other girls and one boy. At this time she met Manchester Evening News journalist Richard Jaffa, who became her manager for the next three years.

Darren was fourteen years old when she signed a two singles deal with Nathan Joseph's folk label " Transatlantic Records", who had notables such as "Long John Baldry". She was working a minimum of two nights per week with alternating pop and jazz outfits, after which she became a backing vocalist for "Clifford T. Ward", a Kidderminster singer-songwriter.

After leaving school at the end of her fifth form year, Darren went professional and joined cabaret group " Second City Sound", for a period of four years. Darren recorded the Love is Blue album, plus two singles, one being a remake of Ike and Tina Turner's "River deep, mountain high", with the B side "Julie", penned by the group's bassist Bill Gilbert. The other single was a piano and string arrangement of the classical piece "The Dream of Olwyn", with a vocal harmony song on the B side "A touch of velvet, a sting of brass". At the time the group were managed by Harry Gunn, a Manchester agent. At the end of the four-year stint, London agents Phil and Dorothy Solomons came on board, subsequently to manage Darren's solo career.

Two years went by treading the boards, then a rock career beckoned. Firstly, with the Lancashire rock band "Stoney End" then in stepped "Hot Chocolate's" manager, Peter Walsh, a London impresario who pursued a recording deal with Decca Records for Darren. Walsh then went on to ask pianist and arranger, Mike Moran, to produce a remake of the Ronette's track "Be my baby" with the B side "How soon hello becomes goodbye" (from the French/Italian film "Le Silencieux" - "The Silent Ones")

== Residencies ==
At the time in the UK, there were band residencies in most towns, therefore, a lot of professional musicians skipped from one location to another, Darren being no exception. She was resident at Manchester Tiffany's Oxford Street, then Rotherham, then Stafford. Later on, her London residencies were at Tiffany's Oxford Street, then Tottenham Mayfair, and Wimbledon Tiffany's. In the 1980s Darren worked at both Reading and Brighton Top Rank residencies, drifting from residency to residency. Later she joined The Dave White Band twice over the years at various Norfolk and Nottingham venues. At the same time, Darren joined forces with Dave White's guitarist Lee Vasey playing jazz/rock on their one day off each week.

== Strawberry Studios ==
Darren met up with songwriter-producers Geoff Gill and Cliff Wade, who worked at Strawberry Studios in Stockport, Cheshire. Darren was pulled in to do backing vocals on some tracks they had written. This was the beginning of her rock career. The next four years were spent touring the UK and Europe. Along the way, there were three "Jenny Darren Bands" over this period. TV slots and tours followed; AC/DC, plus a "Sight and Sound in Concert" appearance supporting the band Be Bop de Luxe for BBC television. Reading, Glastonbury, and Knebworth festivals and others soon followed.

== Dick James Music (DJM) ==
After four years, Darren signed directly to DJM Records with father and son, Dick and Stephen James, who in turn became her joint managers and music publishers. A new Band was to follow. They were: ex-England keyboard player Robert Webb, Andy Richards on second keyboard (Frankie Goes to Hollywood), Chas Cronk on bass (from The Strawbs), Chris West on guitar (from Stomu Yamashta), Luis Jardim on percussion, and Nicko McBrain on drums (Iron Maiden)

The Band recorded one album only (Jenny Darren 2) produced by Tony Sadler. Due to internal problems, the band only played two gigs. A live "off the desk" recording still survives from The Fulcrum Hall, Slough. After that, Darren came off the road and also halted her recording career. Rock was no longer an option and after a passage of time away from it, she embarked upon a jazz career.

Darren worked at Ronnie Scott's club in Soho, London, the 606 Club Chelsea, plus various other jazz clubs around the country. Although live jazz recordings have been completed along the way, little has been released in the jazz vein. Two unreleased albums have not seen the light of day. In later years, Darren also pursued a career as a vocal coach in colleges and involved herself in other areas of music including pop, blues, Celtic, musical theatre, and classical.

== Painted Lady (Helen Mirren) ==
In early 1997 Darren received a phone call from jazz pianist John Donaldson regarding a two-part mini-series he was working on, featuring actress Helen Mirren as Maggie Sheridan. Maggie was portrayed in the film as a washed-up blues vocalist from the 1960s, who had long since stopped performing. The writers (Peter Salem and Alan Cubitt) heard Darren sing on the recommendation of Donaldson and then offered her the singing role of Maggie.

The mini-series was released on video, then DVD. Darren is also credited within the film credits, interpreting songs veering from light pop, to heavy blues, with Celtic overtones at times. This is largely down to the fact of Maggie Sheridan's changing singing voice over the years, from a young teenager to middle age.

== Jazz duo ==
For a short period from mid-2000 onwards, Darren rehearsed and recorded with jazz pianist Max Turnbull. Songs were recorded along the way which were initially meant to be an experiment for a new studio in Hampshire, eventually leading to making an album, entitled Song for New York, the title track written by Darren and Turnbull. The songs were never released and therefore remain unheard.

== Paidarion ==
Darren was in Balham, London to see a retro keyboard workshop by Robert Webb. There she met Finnish record producer and drummer Kimmo Porsti, who asked her if she would like to record with his band Paidarion, to which Darren replied positively. Darren recorded her vocals in the UK, however,the other musicians recorded their own separate musical parts from around the world. They were: Ákos Bokor Bogarti (electric acoustic guitars, backing vocals), Jan-Olof Strandberg (fretless and fretted bass), Otso Pakarinen (Keyboards, synth), Robert Webb ( keys, acoustic guitar, vocals), Kev Moore (vocals). The album entitled Two Worlds Encounter -The Finlandia project, was released in November 2016.

== The Ladykillers (Studio band 1 – late 2014) ==
The Ladykillers band have taken three forms since the recording of the 2017 Ladykillers album. The first being the very first studio band. The main members being: Andy Hawkins - drums: Clive Poole - guitar and Kev Moore.

The album itself was initiated by Moore, taking up on the idea made to Darren by a friend of hers, fellow musician Gordon Milton, who suggested that she should re-record and then re-release "Heartbreaker".

Moore was instrumental from the first in bringing the project into being. He initially brought in fellow guest musicians Graham Oliver (Saxon-guitarist) Tom Leary (Fiddle-Lindisfarne) Andrew Hawkins (Drums - BC Sweet). Then Darren brought in Tony Williams (Guitar-Jaki Graham), Robin George (Guitar-Roy Wood/The Move/ Magnum); then Pete Way (Bass-UFO), and Chris Slade (Drums-AC/DC) by courtesy of Robin George. Nicko McBrain (Drums-Iron Maiden) who was the drummer in Darren's Band when the song "Ode to Billy Joe" was recorded. As also were Robert Webb (England-Keys) Andy Richards (Keys-Frankie Goes to Hollywood) Chas Cronk (Strawbs-Bass) Chris West (Guitar-Stomu Yamashta) and Luis Jardim (percussion-The Buggles).

As well as two versions of "Heartbreaker" being featured on the disc, there is also an updated version of "Ladykiller", taken from the Jenny Darren 1977 album, plus some original songs by Moore, and Witchcross guitarist Mike Koch, Darren and keyboardist Jan Pulsford. The album backtracks were initially recorded with the band, at The Two Rivers Studios. The vocals were recorded at Soundshack Studios in Cheltenham.

The project also came further into being when a promo video was undertaken. Moore had by this time dropped out of the project, only to return briefly a few months later. Darren then brought in Wishbone Ash musicians Bob Skeat (bass) as a replacement for Moore, plus Muddy Manninen (guitar) together with Bill Hunt (keyboards) and on drums in the video Martin Magic Johnson, plus Ian Horley (second guitar) videoed by Greg Wilson-Copp from Soundshack Studios.

== Draco Angelis ==

Draco Angelis were initially an acoustic Celtic rock duo formed by Kev Moore and Darren with Moore on acoustic guitar and Darren on vocals. Moore brought in electric violin and fiddle player Tom Leary, and Darren, guitarist Muddy Manninen for an initial recording. Draco wrote over thirty songs in total. However, only one song at present has been recorded to studio quality – the ballad "Queen Arachnid", the rest of the songs being demoed to be recorded at some future date. Darren and Moore performed at a charity concert in North London in 2016 for the Legacy Project (ex-members of pre-Iron Maiden)

== Ladykillers 2 (Live and recording band) ==

The third and final phase was organised in January 2017, after Moore finally left the project for good, and went back to live in Spain. Darren happened to spot drummer Rupert James Irving playing locally with a Gloucestershire band. After contacting him, he introduced her to other local musicians. The new Ladykillers Band members being Rupert James Irving (drums), J Evans (guitar), Jo Ward (keys) Alun Roberts (bass). The new Ladykiller album was scheduled for release in May 2017 and its album launch was on 31 August 2017.

In September 2017, ex-Wishbone Ash guitarist Muddy Manninen joined The Ladykillers for a short time, as an additional member to the lineup. Manninen also wrote and recorded with Darren until March 2018.

In August of the same year, bassist Alun Roberts, and keys player Jo Ward left the band for personal reasons. Then Birmingham bassist David Brown (brother-in-law of Robin George) joined The Ladykillers, together with (also from Birmingham) guitarist Ben Bartlett. Ben was a temporary addition to the band and was later replaced by a further Birmingham member, guitarist Nigel Jones.

== Britain's Got Talent ==
Darren took part in the 12th season (2018) of the Britain's Got Talent TV show at the age of 68 and was initially headhunted for the show late in 2017. She started her BGT audition dressed as a granny, before stripping down to a rock chick black outfit underneath, and rocking out to AC/DC's "Highway to Hell". The entire audience, including all four judges, gave Darren a standing ovation when she finished singing. Following her appearance, there was an initial, unsubstantiated, negative tabloid newspaper report regarding her, which resulted in Darren no longer appearing in the show. However, the performance video itself has received over 200 million views worldwide, on various collated sites.

During an appearance on Good Morning Britain, Darren revealed how she had missed out on her big chance with the song "Heartbreaker". Her record company released it on a previous album of hers, Queen of Fools in 1978. As they were also a publishing house, in 1979 the song was given to rising U.S. singer Pat Benatar who went on to record it and made it into a huge international hit.

== Discography ==
Darren's first album Love is Blue with Second City Sound was released on the Columbia label in 1968, with her name listed as Jenny Phillips.

Her first solo album was entitled City Lights, released on the DJM label in 1977. This was followed closely by the self titled Jenny Darren album in late 1977. Her third album Queen of Fools, which included the song "Heartbreaker," was released in 1978. The last of her four DJM albums, again self-titled, was Jenny Darren released in 1980.

There was a musical hiatus for many years until 2014. On 6 November 2015 Heartbreaker - The Best Of, was released on the Angel Air label. This was followed by a guest appearance on an album recorded with the Finnish band Paidarion (The Finlandia Project - Two Worlds Encounter - 2016). Then came Ladykillers, a collection of originals and covers by Jenny Darren and The Ladykillers, which was released in 2017 on the Seacrest Oy label, featuring two versions of "Heartbreaker."

Following this there was a compilation of songs that Darren wrote with Robert Webb (England band) released on Green-Tree Nu Music Records, in the summer of 2018.

Then, the re-release (on download only) of Jenny Darren - 2 re-titled The Pink Album, in the late Summer of 2018 on CD Baby. On 8 February 2019 Jenny released an album in collaboration with guitarist Robin George entitled "SavageSongS" on Angel Air Records. Darren has also been a guest vocalist on the Robert Webb Liquorice Allsorts album, plus Box of Circles by England.

To date, Jenny Darren’s tracks can be found on 31 commercially available albums, either as a solo artist, in collaboration with other artists, or on compilation albums. Darren’s singles amount to 16 currently.

=== Second City Sound albums ===
- Love is Blue (1968) with Second City Sound
- A bumper bundle of hits (1969) with Second City Sound and other artists (compilation album)

=== Solo albums ===
- City Lights (DJM - 1977)
- Jenny Darren (DJM - 1978)
- Queen of Fools (DJM - 1978)
- Jenny Darren (DJM - 1980 - later called - The Pink Album)
- Heartbreaker - Best of 1977-1980 (Angel Air - 2015)
- Ladykiller (Seacrest Oy - Jenny Darren & The Ladykillers - 2017)

=== In collaboration and compilation albums ===
- Twilight Asylum - 1976 with Oscar (credited with background vocals)
- The British Company of Rock - 1978 (Brazilian release)
- Rock and Rock and Roll - 1979 (Brazilian release)
- Untitled promotional album - 1981 (Italian release)
- La musica que llego para quedarse Volume 3 - 2000 (with Second City Sound) (Mexican release)
- Instro-hipsters a Go-Go Volume 3 - 2003 (with Second City Sound)
- Twilight Asylum/Cobblestone Heroes, The DJM Years - 2007 with Oscar (credited with background vocals on Twilight Asylum) (Japanese release)
- Instro-hipsters a Go-Go Limited Edition - 2008 (with Second City Sound)
- The Girls Are At It Again 1964-1969 - 2009 (as Jenny Wren)
- Box of Circles (Special taster CD) - 2010 with England
- Liquorice Allsorts - 2014 with Robert Webb
- Decameron - 10 Days in 100 Novellas - (part 2) 2015
- Garden Shed (Golden edition) - 2015 with England
- The Finlandia Project - Two Worlds Encounter - 2016 with Paidarion
- Long Player - 2017 with Muddy Manninen
- Second City Sound Instrumentals - 2017 (with Second City Sound)
- Box of Circles - 2018 with England
- Rare Bird in Rock - 2018 with Robert Webb
- SavageSongS - 2019 with Robin George
- Live It Up! Bayswater Beat Girls 1964-1967 - 2019 (as Jenny Wren)
- Seacrest Oy Collection - 2019
- Wayfarer - 2020 with Kimmo Porsti
- Garden Shed (Expanded edition) - 2021 with England
- British Soul Power - 2022 (as Jenny Wren)

=== Singles (As Jenny Wren) ===
- "Chasing My Dream All Over Town" (Fontana records 1966)
- "The Merry-Go-Round is Slowing You Down" (Fontana records 1966)

=== Singles (Second City Sound) ===
- "A Touch of Velvet, A Sting of Brass" (Major Minor records 1969)
- "River Deep, Mountain High" (Major Minor records 1969)

=== Solo singles (Jenny Darren) ===
- "Be My Baby" (Decca Records 1973)
- "Slay Me Like A Lady" (BUK records 1975)
- "Sure Sugar" (DJM records 1977)
- "Too Many Lovers" (DJM records 1977)
- "Love & Devotion" (DJM records 1977)
- "Ladykiller" (DJM records 1978)
- "Love Potion No.9" (Spanish release 1978)
- "Heartbreaker" (DJM records 1978)
- "Heartbreaker/Queen of Fools (French release 1978)
- "Lover" (DJM records 1980)
- "Rock Music (Breaks Her Little Heart)" (Spanish release1981)

=== Jenny Darren & The Ladykillers single ===
- "Highway to Hell" (CD Baby/iTunes/Amazon 2018)

== Television appearances ==
- Thank your Lucky Stars (as Jenny Wren - 1966)
- Opportunity Knocks (with Second City Sound - 1969) - 6 times winners
- Opportunity Knocks (with Stoney End - 1971)
- Sight & Sound in concert (supporting Be Bop Deluxe - 1978)
- Madrid TV (1979)
- Scotland TV (1980)
- Painted Lady (Featured voice - 1997)
- Me & my Toy Boy - (Channel 5 documentary - 2002)
- Britain's Got Talent (2018)
- Good Morning Britain (2018)

== Videos ==
- Sight & Sound in concert ( supporting Be Bop Deluxe 1978)
- Painted Lady (Featured as the singing voice of Maggie Sheridan (Helen Mirren) - 1997)

== Films ==
Death Promise (Pagliaccio Productions Ltd.) The section of the film involving Jenny Darren and her band The Ladykillers was filmed in January 2019. The scheduled release date for the completed film was early 2020, however there is no further information to date concerning its release.
