= The Writing on the Wall (Iron Maiden song) =

Single by Iron Maiden

from the album Senjutsu
- Released: 15 July 2021
- Recorded: Early 2019
- Studio: Guillaume Tell (Paris)
- Genre: Heavy metal
- Length: 6:13
- Label: Parlophone; Sanctuary (US)
- Songwriters: Adrian Smith; Bruce Dickinson
- Producer: Kevin Shirley

Iron Maiden singles chronology
"Empire of the Clouds" (2016)	"The Writing on the Wall" (2021)	"Stratego" (2021)

Music video
- "The Writing on the Wall" on YouTube

"The Writing on the Wall" is a song by the English heavy metal band Iron Maiden. The song was released on 15 July 2021 alongside a music video, and served as the lead single from their seventeenth studio album Senjutsu. It was also the band's first single since 2016's "Empire of the Clouds".

It was elected by Loudwire as the 14th best metal song of 2021.

== Music video ==
The song's music video was directed by Nicos Livesey from BlinkInk, a London based animation studio, in collaboration with Bruce Dickinson and former Pixar executives and long-standing Maiden fans Mark Andrews and Andrew Gordon via weekly Zoom meetings. The video is a story written by Dickinson, inspired by the biblical stories of Belshazzar's feast and Daniel, as well as other biblical references featuring the band's mascot, Eddie, in various styles influenced by the artwork of previous albums. The visual effects were provided by BlinkInk with fans of the band reaching out with storyboard ideas from across the globe.

== Personnel ==
Iron Maiden

- Bruce Dickinson – vocals
- Dave Murray – guitars
- Adrian Smith – guitars
- Janick Gers – guitars
- Steve Harris – bass
- Nicko McBrain – drums

Production

- Kevin Shirley – production, mixing
- Steve Harris – co-production

== Charts ==
Chart performance for "The Writing On The Wall"
Chart (2021)	Peak position
UK Rock & Metal (OCC)	15
US Hot Rock & Alternative Songs (Billboard)	39
US Rock & Alternative Airplay (Billboard)	36
