= Senjutsu =

Studio album by Iron Maiden
- Released: 3 September 2021
- Recorded: Early 2019
- Studio: Guillaume Tell (Paris)
- Genres: Heavy metal; progressive metal
- Length: 81:53
- Labels: Parlophone; BMG (US)
- Producer: Kevin Shirley

Iron Maiden chronology
Nights of the Dead (2020)	Senjutsu (2021)	50th Anniversary Studio Album Collection, Part One: 1980 – 1992 (2026)

Alternative cover
- The alternative cover was featured on the back of the packaging in physical version.

Singles from Senjutsu
- 1. "The Writing on the Wall" Released: 15 July 2021; 2. "Stratego" Released: 19 August 2021

Senjutsu (Japanese: 戦術, "Tactics") is the seventeenth studio album by English heavy metal band Iron Maiden, released on 3 September 2021. A double album, it was a critical and commercial success, praised for its ambitious epic scope. Two singles, "The Writing on the Wall" and "Stratego", were released to promote the album.

== Overview ==
Senjutsu is the band's first studio album in nearly six years (although having been put on hold for well over two years), following 2015's The Book of Souls, marking the longest gap between two Iron Maiden studio albums. This is also their second studio double album, and their first studio album since 1984's Powerslave to have no songwriting contributions from guitarist Dave Murray in any way, (Note: While 1995's The X Factor does not have a songwriting contribution from Murray, he did co-write one of its bonus tracks.) as well as the first since 1998's Virtual XI to feature multiple songs written by bassist Steve Harris alone.

The name of the album is rendered on the right side of the cover art by the actual vertical Japanese spelling of "senjutsu" (戦術), and on the left side by a font reminiscent of Japanese characters.

== Release and promotion ==
The album's first single "The Writing on the Wall" was released on July 15, 2021. Prior to the song's release Iron Maiden held a promo campaign which included multiple clues and hidden messages, hinting at the song and a possible new album. The song was accompanied with an animated video created by Blinkink. The second and final single "Stratego" was released on August 19, and also had a animated video created to coincide with its release.

In promotion of the album in England, Iron Maiden partnered with British supermarket brand Asda to launch a pair of products celebrating the arrival of the album. Including a Senjutsu edition of Trooper’s Sun & Steel Japanese lager, and a t-shirt featuring the album cover.

Released on 3 September 2021, it received a positive response from most fans and music critics, eventually reaching the top of the bestseller lists of 27 countries, including Belgium (Wallonia and Flanders), Chile, Brazil, Bolivia, Colombia, Mexico, Bulgaria, Romania, Greece, Austria, Switzerland, Germany, Hungary, Croatia, Malaysia, Serbia, Indonesia, Russia, South Africa, Finland, Italy, Portugal, Spain, Sweden, Thailand, India and South Korea.

In the comparison of sales of physical albums in the UK, the double-disc release took the first position, also noted on the European Album Chart Top 200. The album was ranked second on the world music charts. 17th studio effort also gave the band its highest chart position in the US debuting at number three on Billboard Top 200 Albums Chart and number one on Billboard's Physical Albums Chart. Senjutsu was also in the Top 3 bestsellers in the USA (the highest in the group's history so far), Australia, Ireland, Great Britain (first on the lists in Wales and Scotland), Singapore, Israel, UAE, Japan, the Netherlands, France, Czech Republic, Slovakia, Montenegro, Poland, Estonia, Costa Rica, El Salvador, Nepal, Honduras, Uruguay, Cyprus, Latvia, Bosnia and Herzegovina, Luxembourg, Taiwan, Malta and Ukraine.

In South America and Africa, the album went on sale only one week after the official release date. In total, the group's seventeenth album reached the top three bestsellers in 55 countries around the world and the Top 5 bestsellers in 63 countries. Senjutsu turned out to be a tremendous achievement, strengthening the group's brand on the global music market. It was eventually certified gold in their native U.K. in July 2023, and has since been certified gold and 9 other countries.

Iron Maiden held The Future Past World Tour in support of the album which went from May 2023, to December 2024.

== Artwork ==
Senjutsu marks the second use of the band's original logotype (with the extended letters R, M and N) on a studio album cover since 1995's The X Factor, the previous one being for 2015's The Book of Souls. The album cover by Mark Wilkinson presents Eddie dressed up as a samurai and holding a katana. Harris sent Wilkinson reference material of Oni creatures and kabuki paintings and masks, and the artist spent a day seeing the Japanese exhibits on the Victoria and Albert Museum for further inspiration. His first draft had a close-up on Eddie's face like Wilkinson's work in the previous album The Book of Souls, before he sent another with Eddie wearing a helmet - without the visor to not hide his face - holding a sword, which Harris decided to use as the cover while keeping the other in the back. Mark Wilkinson told UK's Metal Hammer magazine: "I knew I would have difficulty just plonking Eddie into samurai costume. The higher caste warriors usually had many layers of highly ornate, dense fabric both to project and pad them out on the battlefield – I couldn't see such a costume working for the skeletal figure of Eddie. Besides, he would look far too flamboyant. I also resisted putting the traditional samurai helmet on his head. It would cover too much detail of the early kabuki-style 'mask' of red warpaint I had sketched out for him. The helmet 'cowl' and 'fukigaeshi' earpieces were like skin and bone attachments. Eddie's head was like a cyborg – part creature, part machine – especially with all the bashed in metal and torn rustic leather of the rest of his costume". The gatefold featured an artwork which Harris commissioned to inspire the band's stage set, featuring Eddie standing in front of a Pagoda surrounded by dead warriors, in a landscape that Wilkinson drew based on the Shotley Peninsula.

== Critical reception ==
Professional ratings
Aggregate scores
Source	Rating
AnyDecentMusic?	7.9/10
Metacritic	83/100
Review scores
Source	Rating
AllMusic	4/5 stars
Classic Rock	4.5/5 stars
The Guardian	5/5 stars
The Independent	4/5 stars
Kerrang!	4/5
Metal Hammer	4.5/5 stars
MetalSucks	3/5 stars
Pitchfork	7.4/10
PopMatters	8/10
Rolling Stone	4/5 stars

At Metacritic, which assigns a normalised rating out of 100 to reviews from professional publications, the album has an average score of 83 based on 15 reviews, indicating "universal acclaim". At AnyDecentMusic?, which collates reviews from more than 50 media sources, the album scored 7.9 out of 10, based on 17 reviews. AllMusic awarded it 4 out of five, stating, "Clocking in at just over 80 minutes, the epic Senjutsu is another distended late-career triumph, albeit one that requires multiple spins to set up camp in your Homeric metal-craving cranium". Wall of Sound scored the album 9/10, calling it an "(...) epic and triumphant return for the lads... better balanced [than The Book of Souls]... with some interesting songwriting". The Guardian awarded it with the highest note and praising Senjutsu as "(...) an ambitious, eccentric master piece". Classic Rock's journalist Dave Ling awarded Senjutsu with 4.5 stars out of 5 describing band's effort as "(…) a remarkable album from a band that still has plenty to say and to offer".

As with the band's former album The Book of Souls, both Kerrang! and Metal Hammer magazines gave the album high marks: the former titled it as "Metal legends Iron Maiden make a stunning surprise return with their 17th studio album, Senjutsu" the latter "Iron Maiden's Senjutsu: an electrifying, cinematic masterpiece" and awarded it with 4.5 out of five stars. Blabbermouth.net were also extremely positive, scoring band's 17th studio album 9/10 and deeming the release in words: "Senjutsu is a modern gem from one of the greatest heavy metal bands ever, if not the absolute greatest".

The American magazine Rolling Stone appreciated Senjutsu and awarded it with 4 out of 5 stars. Overall, the publication had a highly positive opinion of the album, stating: "Iron Maiden age gracefully, make metal for the ages on 'Senjutsu'. Long-running metal firebrands have matured their sound on LP 17 without sacrificing any of their epic grit". Rolling Stone went on to name the album one of the top 50 albums of 2021, and the best metal album of 2021, describing the album as "their most progressive masterstroke yet." Ultimate Classic Rock praised album with an enthusiastic review claiming that "Steve Harris seems to have fulfilled his ambition of turning Maiden into a no-holds-barred prog band, albeit with a taste for riffs and melodies that remain specifically theirs. Blue-collar Genesis, if you will, delivered with intricacy and a spirit of unity. After a four-decade career brimming with epic records in this vein, their 17th album, Senjutsu, may be one of Iron Maiden's most epic".

An international online magazine PopMatters scored the album 8/10, advising the listeners to "(...) let the world's greatest heavy metal band take you on yet another excursion. It's not without its share of bumps and plenty of familiar scenery, but after more than 40 years, it's as exhilarating as ever". British magazine NME gave Iron Maiden's album 4 out of 5 stars; the publication described Senjutsu as "(…) an instant classic in Iron Maiden's 41-year journey. The powerhouse metal sound that's earned them a religious following in every far-flung corner of the globe remains firm. But here, they take things further; ultimately letting imaginations run wild in an album that's more confident and idea-packed than ever before".

Loudwire called it one of the best metal albums of 2021.

=== Accolades and awards ===
The animated video for "The Writing on the Wall" was nominated for the 2021 UK Music Video Awards in the category "Best Animation in a Video". The song was listed among "The 35 Best Metal Songs of 2021" by American online magazine Loudwire, reaching #14. "The Writing on the Wall" reached the 13th position on "Top 40 Rock Songs of 2021" published by Ultimate Classic Rock. Consequence of Sound put the song on "Top Hard Rock and Metal Songs of 2021" list, it's reached the 2nd position. "The Writing on the Wall" made Italian Radio Freccia Top 20 Hits of the Year list to reach the 2nd position. Another Italian portal Inside Music put the composition among the "Top 5 Best Songs of 2021" on the 2nd position. "The Writing on the Wall" was listed among "Best Songs of 2021" by Polish music magazine Teraz Rock, reaching the 2nd position. The song was chosen as "The Song of the Year" by the journalists of Metal Hammer (Greek Edition) and Finnish Tuonela Magazine.

The band and the Senjutsu album were nominated in the categories "Band of the Year", "Album of the Year", "Vocalist of the Year" and "Video of the Year" for the prestigious Czech Žebřík Music Awards. Eventually the double studio album was the "Album of the Year" category winner and animated video for "The Writing on the Wall" achieved the third position, so same as Bruce Dickinson as "Vocalist of the Year". Senjutsu was also nominated in the "International Album of the Year" category for the Spanish Grammy's Premios Odeón Award. Band's seventeenth album was honored with the Top.HR Music Awards by The Croatian Discography Association and the Croatian branch of RTL in the "Bestselling International Album" category. The Top.HR Music Awards has been presented since 2020 and is the local equivalent of the Grammy. Both the band and their latest studio effort were the winners of annual readers' poll announced by German edition of Rock Hard magazine. Senjutsu album was honoured with Polish Antyradio Award in category "Album of the Year – World". The album, "The Writing on the Wall" single and the band were nominated for the Planet Rock Awards (The Rocks 2022) in the categories: "Best Album", "Best Single" and "Best British Band". The British formation's won in the last category, Senjutsu took second place among the best albums, the single reached third place and Iron Maiden were named "The Greatest Metal Band of All Time". In 2022, the band turned out to be the most awarded artist in the history of The Rocks.

"Darkest Hour" was listed among "Best 50 Rock and Metal Songs of 2021" by Audio Ink Radio. The second single called "Stratego" made the "Top 10 Best Guitar Riffs of 2021" list published by Guitar World. "Hell on Earth" was voted the fourth best song of 2021 in Ultimate Guitars' awards poll. The song was ranked as the sixth best song of 2021 by Toru Sugaya of the Japanese website Gekirock. "The Parchment" was listed among "Best Hard Rock Songs of 2021" published by Swedish newspaper Aftonbladet, the album's longest composition reached the 4th position. Promo videos for album's songs "Stratego" and "The Writing on the Wall" were listed among "Best Music Videos of 2021 (Rock and Alternative)" by Promonews TV.

In the summary of the Japanese magazine Burrn!, the Senjutsu album was recognized as the second most important album of 2021; further, the illustration adorning it was also appreciated (2nd position), and the single "The Writing on the Wall" was selected as the fourth best song in 2021. Steve Harris as bassist and composer was recognized as the best musician in these categories and Iron Maiden maintained the title of "Best Foreign Group". Adrian Smith was recognized as the fourth best guitarist in the world. The album was nominated for Fonogram – Magyar Zenei Díj, the Hungarian equivalent of the Grammy, in the category "Best Hard Rock / Metal Album". Senjutsu was awarded with Sklizen Award established by Czech Spark Magazine. Band's seventeenth album was the winner in "Best Album of the Year" category.

Publication	Accolade/Award	Rank
Advertiser	The Best Albums of 2021	Won
AntyRadio Award	Album of the Year Award	Won
Burrn!	Album of the Year	2
Burrn!	Best Album Cover of 2021	2
Business Today	Top 10 Albums of the Year	2
Classic Rock	Album of the Year Award	Won
Classic Rock Italia	Top 50 Albums of 2021 Award	Won
Consequence	Top Metal & Hard Rock Albums	Won
Carretera y Manta	Top 15 Best Albums of the Year	12
Decibel	Top 40 Albums of 2021	9
Dennik N	Top 20 Albums of 2021	3
Glide Magazine	20 Best Albums of 2021	-
Global Metal Apocalypse (GMA)	Release Of The Year (2021) Award	Won
Greek Rebels	Top 20 Albums of 2021	Won
Guitar World	The Best Guitar Albums of 2021	3
Heavy Music HQ	The Best Heavy Metal Albums of 2021	6
Highway81	Top 10 Best Albums of the Year	Won
IWM Buzz	The Comeback of 2021	3
Interia.pl	Best Albums of the Year	6
Kerrang!	The 50 Best Albums of 2021	14
Loud 'n' Proud	Top 10 Albums of 2021 (Readers Poll)	Won
Louder Sound	The 50 Best Metal Albums of 2021	4
Loudwire	The 45 Best Rock + Metal Albums of 2021	5
Mania Magazine	Top 5 Heavy Albums Award	Won
Mariskal Rock	Top 10 Albums of 2021 (Redaction) Award	Won
Mariskal Rock	Rockferendum 2021: Best Album Award	Won
Metal Addicts	Best Metal Albums of 2021	4
MetalFan.nl	Top 10 Best MetalAlbums of 2021	3
Metal Hammer	Top 20 Best Albums of 2021	3
Metal Hammer Germany	Top 10 Heavy Metal Albums of 2021	2
Metal Hammer Germany	Best Album of 2021 (Readers' Poll)	2
Metal Hammer Greece	Top 10 Albums of 2021 Award	Won
Metal Invader	The Best Metal Albums of 2021	Won
Metalhead Community	Top 10 Best Albums of 2021	3
Metal Injection	Albums of the Year	6
Metal Storm Awards	The Biggest Letdown Award	Won
Metal Storm Awards	Best Heavy/Melodic Metal Album Award	Won
Metal Storm Awards	Best Video Award	Won
Mondo Sonoro	Top 10 Best Metal Albums of 2021	2
Monterrey Rock	Top 10 Best Albums of 2021	2
Nieuwsblad	Top 5 Best Albums of 2021	5
Norran Magazine	Top 10 Best Albums of 2021	3
Notizie Musica	Top 10 Albums of 2021	2
Onet Kultura	Top 10 Best Albums of 2021	10
Planet Rock Awards (The Rocks)	The Best Album of 2021	2
PopMatters	The 75 Best Albums of 2021	70
Prog	Top 20 Prog Albums of 2021	13
Radio Lublin	Top 10 Best Albums of 2021	Won
Reporter UA	Top 5 Best Metal Albums of 2021	2
Radio Futuro	The Best Albums of 2021 Award	Won
Revolver	Top 25 Albums of 2021	7
Ride the Sky	Top 10 Rock/Hard Rock Albums of 2021	2
Roadie Crew	Best Albums of 2021 Award	Won
Rock Bizz	12 Best Metal Albums of 2021 Award	Won
Rock Cult	Best Albums of 2021	5
Rock FM	10 Best Metal Albums of 2021 Award	Won
Rock Hard	Album of the Year Award	Won
Rock Meeting	Top Albums of 2021	5
Rock Overdose	Top Albums of 2021	3
Rockabilia	21 Best Albums of 2021	3
Rockland FM	Best Albums of 2021 Award	Won
Rocknytt	The 50 Best Albums of 2021	15
Rolling Stone	50 Best Albums of 2021	44
Rolling Stone	The 10 Best Metal Albums of 2021 Award	Won
Sklizen Award	Best Album of 2021 Award	Won
Soundi	Top 20 Foreign Albums of 2021	18
Spark Rock Magazine	Best Heavy Albums of 2021 Award	Won
Stone Music	Top 20 Rock Albums of 2021	7
Teraz Rock	Album of the Year Award	Won
The Metal Voice	Top 10 Metal Albums of the Year Award	Won
Top.HR Music Awards	Bestselling International Album Award	Won
Tuonela Magazine	Top 20 Albums of 2021	6
Ultimate Classic Rock	Top 40 Best Albums of 2021	8
Ultimate Classic Rock	Top 10 Hard Rock & Metal Albums of 2021	2
Uni India	Top 10 Metal Albums of the Year Award	Won
Update Mexico	Top 10 Best Albums of the Year	6
Yahoo! Entertainment	Albums of the Year (Staff)	2
Yardbarker	Top 10 Best Albums of 2021	5
Yorkshire Post	Albums of the Year	8
WCJU	Best Metal Album of 2021 Award	Won
Whiplash.net	Top 10 Events of the Year	2
Wikimetal	Top 50 Best Rock & Metal Albums of 2021 Awards	Won
Wikimetal	Best Metal Album of 2021: Poll	Won
World of Metal	Top 20 Heavy Metal Albums of 2021	Won
XS Rock Radio	Top 15 Best Albums of 2021	2
Zware Metalen	Best Albums of 2021	5
Žebřík Music Awards	Album of a Year Award	Won

== Track listing ==
Disc one
No.	Title	Writer(s)	Length
1.	"Senjutsu"	Adrian Smith; Steve Harris	8:20
2.	"Stratego"	Janick Gers; Harris	4:59
3.	"The Writing on the Wall"	Smith; Bruce Dickinson	6:14
4.	"Lost in a Lost World"	Harris	9:31
5.	"Days of Future Past"	Smith; Dickinson	4:03
6.	"The Time Machine"	Gers; Harris	7:09
Total length:			40:15

Disc two
No.	Title	Writer(s)	Length
1.	"Darkest Hour"	Smith; Dickinson	7:20
2.	"Death of the Celts"	Harris	10:20
3.	"The Parchment"	Harris	12:39
4.	"Hell on Earth"	Harris	11:19
Total length:			41:38

== Personnel ==
Personnel taken from Senjutsu CD booklet.

=== Iron Maiden ===
- Bruce Dickinson – vocals
- Dave Murray – guitars
- Adrian Smith – guitars
- Janick Gers – guitars
- Steve Harris – bass guitar, keyboards
- Nicko McBrain – drums

=== Technical personnel ===
- Kevin "Caveman" Shirley – production, mixing
- Steve Harris – co-production, art direction, design
- Denis Caribaux – engineering
- Ade Emsley – mastering
- Stuart Crouch Creative – art direction, design
- Mark "The Tinkerer" Wilkinson, Michael Knowland – illustrations
- Ruth Rowland – calligraphy
- Moe Iwata – Japanese translations

== Charts ==
=== Weekly charts ===
Weekly chart performance for Senjutsu
Chart (2021)	Peak position
Argentinian Albums (CAPIF)	5
Australian Albums (ARIA)	3
Austrian Albums (Ö3 Austria)	1
Belgian Albums (Ultratop Flanders)	1
Belgian Albums (Ultratop Wallonia)	1
Bolivian Albums Chart	1
Brazilian Albums (ABPD)	1
Canadian Albums (Billboard)	5
Chilean Albums Chart	1
Colombian Albums Chart	1
Croatian International Albums (HDU)	1
Czech Albums (ČNS IFPI)	2
Danish Albums (Hitlisten)	5
Dutch Albums (Album Top 100)	2
Finnish Albums (Suomen virallinen lista)	1
French Albums (SNEP)	2
German Albums (Offizielle Top 100)	1
Greek Albums (IFPI)	1
Hungarian Albums (MAHASZ)	1
Indian Albums Chart	1
Indonesian Albums Chart	1
Irish Albums (Official Charts)	3
Israeli Albums (Media Forest)	3
Italian Albums (FIMI)	1
Japanese Albums (Oricon)	10
Japanese International Albums	2
Malaysian Albums Chart	1
Mexican Albums (Top 100 Mexico)	1
New Zealand Albums (RMNZ)	9
Norwegian Albums (VG-lista)	5
Polish Albums (ZPAV)	2
Portuguese Albums (AFP)	1
Romanian Albums Chart	1
Russian Albums Chart	1
South Korean Albums Chart	1
Serbian Albums Chart	1
Scottish Albums (Official Charts)	1
Slovak Albums (ČNS IFPI)	3
Spanish Albums (Promusicae)	1
South African Albums (EMA)	1
Swedish Albums (Sverigetopplistan)	1
Swiss Albums (Schweizer Hitparade)	1
Thai Albums Chart	1
Turkish Albums (Turkish Music Charts)	3
UK Albums (Official Charts)	2
UK Rock & Metal Albums (Official Charts)	1
Uruguayan Albums (CUD)	2
US Billboard 200	3
US Top Hard Rock Albums (Billboard)	1
US Top Rock Albums (Billboard)	1
US Independent Albums (Billboard)	1
US Billboard Top Album Sales	1
European Albums (Billboard)	1

=== Year-end charts ===
Year-end chart performance for Senjutsu
Chart (2021)	Position
Austrian Albums (Ö3 Austria)	20
Belgian Albums (Ultratop Flanders)	66
Belgian Albums (Ultratop Wallonia)	49
Croatian Foreign Albums (HDU)	1
Czech Albums (ČNS IFPI)	6
French Albums (SNEP)	94
German Albums (Offizielle Top 100)	6
Hungarian Albums (MAHASZ)	10
Italian Albums (FIMI)	78
Polish Albums (ZPAV)	38
Portuguese Albums (AFP)	14
Spanish Albums (PROMUSICAE)	23
Swiss Albums (Schweizer Hitparade)	7
UK Albums (OCC)	74
US Top Rock Albums (Billboard)	58
US Top Hard Rock Albums (Billboard)	28

== Certifications ==
Region	Certification	Certified units/sales
Brazil (Pro-Música Brasil)	Gold	20,000^{‡}
Croatia (HDU)	3× Gold	9,000
France (SNEP)	Gold	50,000^{‡}
Germany (BVMI)	Gold	100,000^{‡}
Hungary (MAHASZ)	Gold	2,000^{‡}
Italy (FIMI)	Gold	25,000^{‡}
Poland (ZPAV)	Gold	10,000^{‡}
Spain (Promusicae)	Gold	20,000^{‡}
Sweden (GLF)	Gold	15,000^{‡}
United Kingdom (BPI)	Gold	100,000
^{‡} Sales+streaming figures based on certification alone.
