= Rock Aid Armenia =

British charity band, supergroup

Rock Aid Armenia, also known in earlier stages as Live Aid Armenia, was a humanitarian effort by the British music industry to raise money to help those affected by the 1988 Armenian earthquake.

Initiated by the international charity campaigner Jon Dee, the project comprised a number of singles, compilations and a documentary. A special record label Life-Aid Armenia Records was established for producing and distributing the releases by Rock Aid Armenia.

All of the Rock Aid Armenia projects were coordinated by Jon Dee. Dee started the project after overseeing the satellite transmission of footage from the Armenian earthquake zone which he distributed to TV newsrooms worldwide. Other key members of the team included film producer Paul Lovell (who produced and edited the Smoke on the Water documentary and who was co-executive producer of "Smoke on the Water"), Phil Banfield (manager of Ian Gillan who assisted on the track) and Rock Aid Armenia's Peter Welles-Thorpe, David Highton, Isobel Sarkissian and Sarah Kaye.

== "What's Going On" single ==
The first project was credited to Life Aid Armenia, and was a remake of "What's Going On" that featured Aswad, Errol Brown, Richard Darbyshire, Gail Ann Dorsey, Boy George, David Gilmour, Nick Heyward, Mykaell S. Riley, Labi Siffre, Helen Terry, Ruby Turner, Elizabeth Westwood and the Reggae Philharmonic Orchestra.

The B-side was "A Cool Wind Is Blowing", a piece of Armenian duduk music played by Djivan Gasparyan.

The record was produced by Steve Levine and the executive producers were Fraser Kennedy and Jon Dee. This was released as a single on Island Records.

== "Smoke on the Water" single ==
The project is most remembered for a re-recording of Deep Purple's famous hit song, "Smoke on the Water", with different vocalists singing each verse. The single made it to the UK Top 40 Singles Chart. The track was recorded by an elite group of contemporary progressive rock, hard rock and heavy metal musicians who gathered at the historic Metropolis Studios in Chiswick, London. Recording began on July 8, 1989 and was completed over 5 different sessions.

The rock musicians involved in the recording of the song included:

Vocals:

- Ian Gillan
- Bruce Dickinson
- Paul Rodgers
- Bryan Adams

Guitars:

- Brian May
- David Gilmour
- Tony Iommi
- Ritchie Blackmore
- Alex Lifeson

Bass:

- Chris Squire

Keyboards:

- Geoff Downes
- Keith Emerson

Drums:

- Roger Taylor

John Paul Jones and Jon Lord were credited as "helping" behind the scenes with the track. Due to Brian May's arm injury, session guitarist Geoff Beauchamp stepped in to fill in the guitar tracks while he makes a recovery. The track's producers were Gary Langan and Geoff Downes. Talent co-ordination for the record was overseen by Jon Dee, with David Gilmour being the first to join up after a call from Dee. Ian Gillan's manager Phil Banfield also helped out with talent recruitment. "Paranoid" by Black Sabbath was used as a B-Side for the releases.

In 1990, the song was released again with an alternate mix, one example of which was released by Dino Music, which unlike the rest, had "Black Night" also by Deep Purple as a B-side and had Tony Iommi's name incorrectly spelt on the front of it as "Tommy Iommi."

=== Rock Aid Armenia: The Making of Smoke on the Water documentary ===
The recording sessions for the re-recording of "Smoke on the Water" were filmed and released in the same year on video as Rock Aid Armenia: The Making of Smoke on the Water, along with interviews and a video clip for the single. Film producer Paul Lovell produced and edited the final extended version of the documentary which was released on Laser Disc and VHS in Japan in 1991. The organization has since been made available for viewing via YouTube.

== The Earthquake Album ==
The Earthquake Album

Studio album by Rock Aid Armenia
- Released: March 31, 1990
- Recorded: Various
- Genre: Rock
- Label: Life-Aid Armenia

The other successful parts of the project were The Earthquake Album (which was the first UK charity album to go gold) and the accompanying The Earthquake Video. These compilations consisted of donated tracks by Pink Floyd, Bon Jovi, Iron Maiden, Led Zeppelin, Emerson, Lake & Palmer, Gary Moore, Black Sabbath, Asia, Mike + The Mechanics, Rush, Deep Purple, Foreigner, Yes, Whitesnake and others. Rock Aid Armenia: The Earthquake Album was released in 1990.

The Earthquake Album track list

1. Rock Aid Armenia – Smoke on the Water '90 (4:07)
2. Free – All Right Now (4:15)
3. Rush – The Spirit of Radio (4:58)
4. Rainbow – Since You Been Gone (3:18)
5. Black Sabbath – Headless Cross (5:03)
6. Genesis – Turn It On Again (3:45)
7. Yes – Owner of a Lonely Heart (4:27)
8. Emerson, Lake & Palmer – Fanfare for the Common Man (2:57)
9. Whitesnake – Fool for Your Loving (4:17)
10. Asia – Heat of the Moment (3:50)
11. Starship – We Built This City (4:51)
12. Foreigner – Jukebox Hero (4:05)
13. Iron Maiden – Run to the Hills (3:54)
14. Deep Purple – Black Night (3:27)
15. Mike + The Mechanics – Silent Running (4:09)

=== Certifications ===
Region	Certification	Certified units/sales
United Kingdom (BPI)	Gold	100,000^{^}
^{^} Shipments figures based on certification alone.

== The Earthquake Video ==
The release of the video Rock Aid Armenia: The Earthquake Video being a video compilation was released in 1990 concurrently with the release of The Earthquake Album.

The Earthquake Video track list

1. Emerson, Lake & Palmer – Fanfare for the Common Man
2. Bon Jovi – Livin' on a Prayer
3. Gary Moore – After the War
4. Iron Maiden – Run to the Hills
5. Black Sabbath – Headless Cross
6. Led Zeppelin – Dazed and Confused
7. Asia – Heat of the Moment
8. Foreigner – Hearts Turn to Stone
9. Mike + The Mechanics – Silent Running
10. The Firm – Satisfaction Guaranteed
11. Deep Purple – Perfect Strangers
12. Genesis – Mama
13. Pink Floyd – One Slip
14. Rush – The Spirit of Radio
15. Yes – I've Seen All Good People
16. Rock Aid Armenia – Smoke on the Water '90

== "Rock and Roll" by McEnroe & Cash ==
"Rock and Roll"

Single by McEnroe & Cash with the Full Metal Rackets (Rock Aid Armenia)

Music video
- "Rock and Roll" (The Full Metal Rackets) on YouTube

The final project in the original Rock Aid Armenia releases was a remake of the Led Zeppelin song "Rock and Roll". Released in 1991, the track was recorded by tennis players John McEnroe and Pat Cash playing guitar, and featured Roger Daltrey from the Who on lead vocals, Steve Harris and Nicko McBrain from Iron Maiden on bass and drums, and Andy Barnett as third guitar.
