= Ian Gillan & Tony Iommi: WhoCares =

Compilation album by WhoCares (Ian Gillan, Tony Iommi & Friends)
- Released: 13 July 2012 (Europe); 28 August 2012 (North America)
- Recorded: Various
- Genres: Hard rock, heavy metal
- Label: EarMusic

Singles from Ian Gillan & Tony Iommi: WhoCares
- 1. ""Out of My Mind / Holy Water"" Released: 2011

WhoCares, full title Ian Gillan & Tony Iommi: WhoCares, is a music project by Deep Purple frontman Ian Gillan and Black Sabbath guitarist Tony Iommi and a charity release by the supergroup WhoCares they had formed with the help of other musicians, to raise money to rebuild a music school in Gyumri, Armenia after the destruction of the city in the 1988 earthquake in Armenia.

In addition to Ian Gillan and Tony Iommi (who were Black Sabbath bandmates from 1983 to 1984), many artists took part in the charity music project including Jon Lord (Ian Gillan's former Deep Purple bandmate), ex-Metallica bassist Jason Newsted, Iron Maiden drummer Nicko McBrain, and HIM guitarist Mikko "Linde" Lindström.

In addition to the 2-track single "Out of My Mind / Holy Water" released in 2011, the 2-CD album contains other previously recorded songs from various bands, rarities and unreleased material as well. The album was released on 13 July 2012 in Europe and in North America on 28 August 2012.

Jon Lord died three days after the album's release, making it his final recording.

== Reception ==
Since its release, the album has been met with positive responses. Reviewer William Clark of Guitar International gave the album a positive review, saying "The wondrous contributions by Ronnie James Dio, Glenn Hughes, and by members of Metallica, Repo Depo, Iron Maiden, HIM, Deep Purple, and Black Sabbath should make nearly every hard rock and heavy metal fan weak at the knees!".

== Track listing ==
CD 1

No.	Title	Writer(s)	Performer(s)	Length
1.	"Out of My Mind" (Originally released on the CD single "Out of My Mind / Holy Water")	Ian Gillan and Tony Iommi	WhoCares feat. Ian Gillan, Tony Iommi, Mikko Lindström, Jason Newsted, Jon Lord, Nicko McBrain	5:18
2.	"Zero the Hero" (Originally released on Born Again by Black Sabbath)	Tony Iommi, Geezer Butler, Bill Ward, and Ian Gillan	Black Sabbath	7:37
3.	"Trashed (Re-recording)" (Originally released on Born Again by Black Sabbath, this version from Gillan's Inn)	Tony Iommi, Ian Gillan, Geezer Butler and Bill Ward	Ian Gillan feat. Tony Iommi, Ian Paice & Roger Glover
4.	"Get Away" (Originally released on Etsi M Aresei by Michalis Rakintzis)	Michalis Rakintzis	Michalis Rakintzis feat. Ian Gillan	4:44
5.	"Slip Away" (Recorded during the Fused session, first time on CD)	Tony Iommi, Glenn Hughes and Bob Marlette	Tony Iommi feat. Glenn Hughes	5:26
6.	"Don't Hold Me Back" (Originally released on Toolbox by Ian Gillan)	Ian Gillan and Steve Morris	Ian Gillan	4:38
7.	"She Think It's a Crime" (Originally released on the bonus 7" vinyl of the deluxe edition of One Eye to Morocco by Ian Gillan. First time on CD)	Ian Gillan and Steve Morris	Ian Gillan	3:56
8.	"Easy Come, Easy Go" (Previously unreleased. Recorded in 1994, mixed by Ferdi Bolland in May 2012)	Ian Gillan / Repo Depo	Repo Depo feat. Ian Gillan	4:40
9.	"Smoke on the Water (Re-recording)" (Originally released on In Concert with The London Symphony Orchestra by Deep Purple)	Ritchie Blackmore, Ian Gillan, Roger Glover, Jon Lord and Ian Paice	Deep Purple feat. Ronnie James Dio	6:41

CD 2

No.	Title	Writer(s)	Performer(s)	Length
1.	"Holy Water" (Originally released on the WhoCares CD-single "Out of My Mind / Holy Water")	Ian Gillan and Steve Morris	WhoCares feat. Ian Gillan, Tony Iommi, Steve Morris, Michael Lee Jackson, Rodney Appleby, Randy Clarke, Jesse O'Brien	7:01
2.	"Anno Mundi" (Originally released on TYR by Black Sabbath)	Tony Iommi, Cozy Powell, Tony Martin, Neil Murray and Geoff Nicholls	Black Sabbath	6:14
3.	"Let It Down Easy" (Recorded during the Fused sessions)	Tony Iommi, Glenn Hughes and Bob Marlette	Tony Iommi feat. Glenn Hughes	4:30
4.	"Hole in my Vest" (Originally released as B-side on the 7" and 12" single "Nothing But the Best" by Ian Gillan)	Ian Gillan and Steve Morris	Ian Gillan	3:40
5.	"Can't Believe You Wanna Leave Me" (Originally released on Accidentally on Purpose by Gillan & Glover)	Little Richard	Ian Gillan & Roger Glover feat. Dr. John	3:12
6.	"Can I Get a Witness" (Originally released on Sole Agency and Representation rereleased later as Raving with Ian Gillan & The Javelins by The Javelins, a one-album project by Ian Gillan)	Holland–Dozier–Holland	Ian Gillan & The Javelins	3:04
7.	"No Laughing in Heaven" (Originally released on Garth Rockett and the Moonshiners by Garth Rockett aka Ian Gillan)	Ian Gillan, John McCoy, Bernie Tormé, Colin Towns and Mick Underwood	Garth Rockett & The Moonshiners	6:06
8.	"When a Blind Man Cries" (Recorded live at Absolute Radio, London with Steve Morris on acoustic guitar. Previously unreleased)	Steve Morse, Ian Gillan, Roger Glover, Jon Lord, Ian Paice	Ian Gillan	4:35
9.	"Dick Pimple" (Studio jam by Deep Purple, originally recorded for sale via the Deep Purple Appreciation Society as “Dick Pimple Presents Music From Turtle Island”.)	Steve Morse, Ian Gillan, Roger Glover, Jon Lord, Ian Paice	Deep Purple	10:04

== Track-by-track personnel ==
"Out of My Mind"

- Ian Gillan – vocals
- Tony Iommi – guitar
- Mikko "Linde" Lindström – guitar
- Jon Lord – keyboards
- Jason Newsted – bass
- Nicko McBrain – drums

"Zero the Hero"

- Ian Gillan – vocals
- Tony Iommi – guitars
- Geoff Nicholls – keyboards
- Geezer Butler – bass
- Bill Ward – drums, percussion

"Trashed"

- Ian Gillan – vocals
- Tony Iommi – guitars
- Roger Glover – bass
- Ian Paice – drums

"Get Away"

- Ian Gillan – vocals
- Michalis Rakintzis – instrumentation, arrangement

"Slip Away" and "Let It Down Easy"

- Tony Iommi – guitar
- Glenn Hughes – vocals, bass
- Bob Marlette – keyboards, bass
- Kenny Aronoff – drums

"Don't Hold Me Back"

- Ian Gillan – vocals
- Steve Morris – guitar
- Brett Bloomfield – bass
- Leonard Haze – drums

"She Think It's a Crime"

- Ian Gillan – vocals, harmonica
- Michael Lee Jackson – guitar
- Rodney Appleby – bass
- Howard Wilson – drums
- Steve Morris – guitar
- Joe Mennonna – saxophones
- Lance Anderson – Hammond organ
- Jesse O'Brien – keyboards
- Brownman Ali – flugelhorn
- Jaro Jarosil – cello
- The Gillanaires – backing vocals

"Easy Come, Easy Go"

- Ian Gillan – vocals
- Dean Howard – guitar
- Steve Morris – guitar
- Brett Bloomfield – bass
- Leonard Haze – drums

"Smoke on the Water"

- Ian Gillan – vocals
- Ronnie James Dio – vocals
- Steve Morse – guitar
- Steve Morris – guitar
- Jon Lord – keyboards
- Roger Glover – bass
- Dave LaRue – bass
- Ian Paice – drums
- Van Romaine – drums
- Aitch McRobbie, Margo Buchanan, Pete Brown – backing vocals
- Annie Whitehead – trombone
- Paul Spong – trumpet, flugelhorn
- Roddy Lorimer – trumpet, flugelhorn
- Simon C. Clarke – baritone, alto sax, flute
- Tim Sanders – tenor sax, soprano sax

"Holy Water"

- Ian Gillan – vocals
- Tony Iommi – guitar
- Steve Morris – guitar
- Michael Lee Jackson – guitar
- Jesse O'Brien – keyboards
- Rodney Appleby – bass
- Randy Clarke – drums
- Arshak Sahakyan – dukuk
- Ara Gevorgyan – dukuk, keyboards

"Anno Mundi"

- Tony Martin – vocals
- Tony Iommi – guitars
- Geoff Nicholls – keyboards
- Neil Murray – bass
- Cozy Powell – drums, percussion

"Hole In My Vest"

- Ian Gillan – vocals
- Steve Morris – guitar

"Can't Believe You Wanna Leave Me"

- Ian Gillan – vocals, harmonica
- Roger Glover – bass, keyboards, guitars, programming
- Ira Siegel, Nick Maroch – guitars
- Lloyd Landesman – keyboards
- Dr. John – piano
- Andy Newmark – drums
- George Young, Joe Mennonna – saxophones
- Randy Brecker – flugelhorn
- Vaneese Thomas, Christine Faith, Lydia Mann, Bette Sussmann – background vocals

"Can I Get a Witness"

- Ian Gillan – vocals, harmonica
- Gordon Fairminer – lead guitar
- Tony Tacon – rhythm guitar
- Tony Whitfield – bass guitar
- Keith Roach – drums

"No Laughing In Heaven"

- Ian Gillan – vocals
- Steve Morris – guitar, keyboards
- Harry Shaw – guitar
- Mark Buckle – keyboards
- Keith Mulholland – bass
- Lou Rosenthal – drums

"When a Blind Man Cries"

- Ian Gillan – vocals
- Steve Morris – acoustic guitar

== Charts ==
Charts	Peak position
Australia	26
Belgium (Wa)	184
Belgium (Vl)	193
Germany	60
Norway	29
Sweden	26
