= WhoCares =

Rock band

- Origin: United Kingdom
- Genres: Hard rock, heavy metal
- Years active: 2011–2012
- Past members: Ian Gillan; Tony Iommi; Jon Lord; Jason Newsted; Nicko McBrain; Mikko "Linde" Lindström

WhoCares was a supergroup formed by Ian Gillan of Deep Purple and Tony Iommi of Black Sabbath in 2011 with the participation of a great number of rock artists as a charity project to raise money to rebuild a music school in Gyumri, Armenia, after the destruction of the city in the 1988 earthquake in Armenia. The album sold more than 20,000 copies in Europe.

== Members ==
The supergroup WhoCares was originally made up of Ian Gillan (of Deep Purple) and Tony Iommi (of Black Sabbath).

Many artists took part in the project, namely Jon Lord (of Deep Purple), Jason Newsted (of Metallica), Nicko McBrain (of Iron Maiden) and Mikko "Linde" Lindström (of HIM)

== Background ==
The formation of the project WhoCares follows a two-decade continuous efforts by Gillan in helping Armenia after the devastating earthquake there in north of the country. Gillan had been involved in Rock Aid Armenia following the earthquake. The documentary Picture of Home shot by Bernie Zelvis and Christina Rowatt documented Gillan's involvement with David Gilmour, Brian May, Ritchie Blackmore and Bruce Dickinson in recording "Smoke on the Water" as a charity for Armenian relief efforts.

On a return visit to Armenia to receive an honorary presidential medal for their efforts, Gillan and Iommi learned about a derelict music school in Gyumri heavily affected by the earthquake. The music school was in dire need of repairs and staff, and lacked many musical instruments. Gillan and Iommi formed WhoCares to provide financing for the school and solicited help from other artists to make music as a charity for the school.

== Releases ==
WhoCares debut single in 2011 was the 2-track release "Out of My Mind / Holy Water", a charity release that was made available digital download, on CD and as a limited 7" edition

In July–August 2012, WhoCares launched a 2-CD release Ian Gillan & Tony Iommi: WhoCares containing many classic songs, but also rarities and special tracks for the album.

== Members ==
- Ian Gillan (Deep Purple) – vocals
- Tony Iommi (Black Sabbath) – guitars
- Jon Lord (Deep Purple) – keyboards
- Jason Newsted (Metallica) – bass
- Nicko McBrain (Iron Maiden) – drums
- Mikko "Linde" Lindström (HIM) – guitars

== Discography ==
=== Albums ===
Year	Album	Peak Position		Certification
Year	Album	NOR	SWE	Certification
2011/2012	Ian Gillan & Tony Iommi: WhoCares	29	26	

=== Singles ===
Year	Single	Peak Position	Certification	Album
Year	Single	GER	Certification	Album
2011	"Out of My Mind / Holy Water"	86		Ian Gillan & Tony Iommi: WhoCares
