= Nicko McBrain =

English drummer (born 1952)

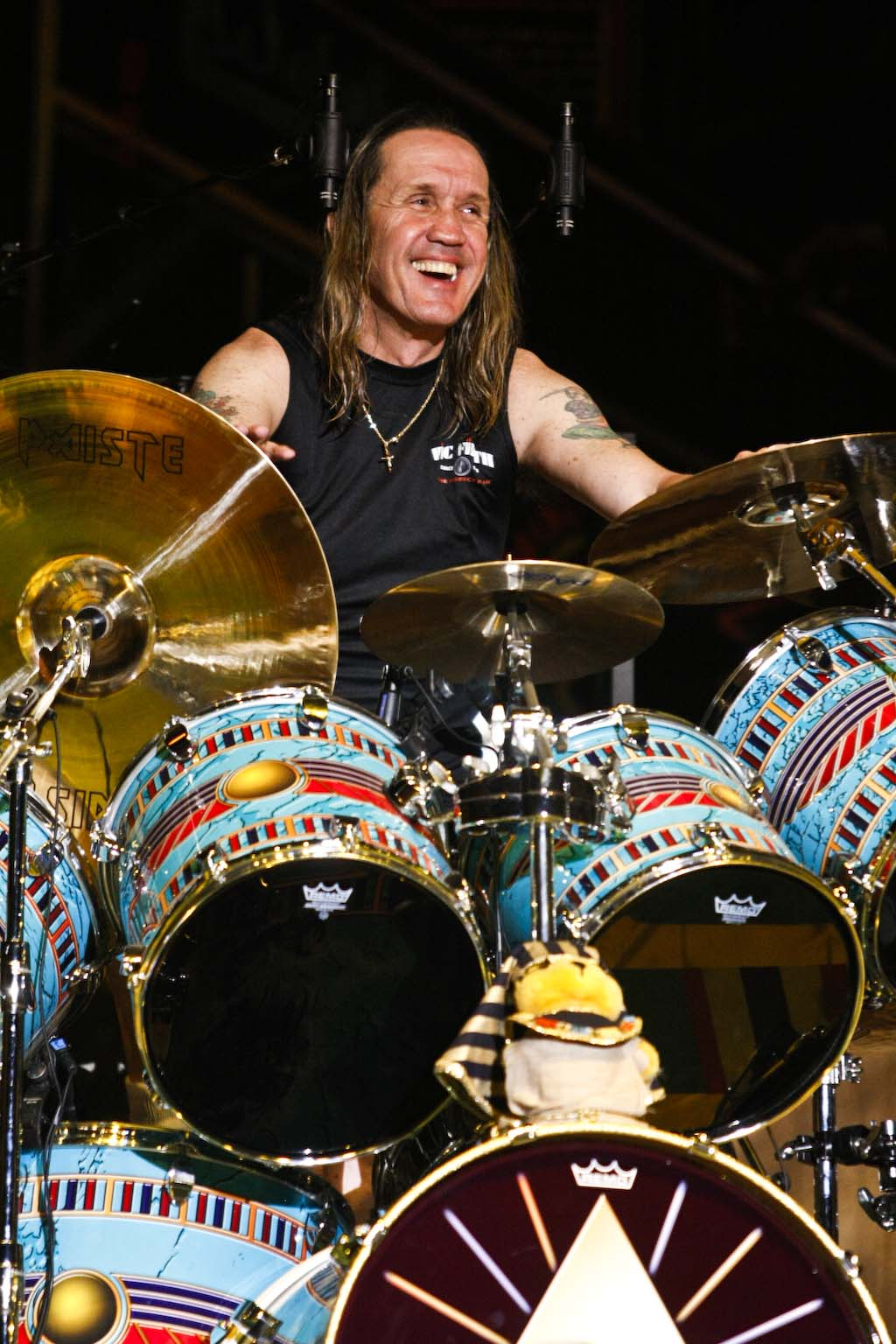
- McBrain in Costa Rica during the Somewhere Back in Time World Tour, 2008

Background information
- Born: Michael Henry McBrain; 5 June 1952 (age 74); Hackney, London, England
- Origin: Chipping Barnet, London, England
- Genres: Heavy metal; blues rock; hard rock
- Occupation: Drummer
- Years active: 1966–present
- Member of: Iron Maiden; The McBrainiacs; Titanium Tart
- Formerly of: Pat Travers; Streetwalkers; Trust; Lionheart; McKitty; The Entire Population of Hackney; Stretch; WhoCares

Michael Henry "Nicko" McBrain (born 5 June 1952) is an English musician, best known as the drummer of the heavy metal band Iron Maiden since 1982. He is the third-longest serving member of the band, having appeared on each Iron Maiden album since Piece of Mind (1983). McBrain retired from touring in 2024, although he remains a member of the band for studio projects. Having played in small pub bands since 1966 from the age of 14, after leaving school, McBrain did session work before joining a variety of artists, such as Streetwalkers in 1975, Pat Travers, and the French hard rock band Trust. By 2026, the band's albums with Nicko McBrain had sold well over 100 million copies.

== Early life and education ==
McBrain was born in Hackney, London, and first wanted to learn the drums at a young age after watching Joe Morello performing with The Dave Brubeck Quartet on television. Later Ringo Starr, Charlie Watts, Keith Moon, John Bonham and Brian Bennett became his major influences on the instrument.

At the age of ten, he started to play drums with pots, pans and other kitchen utensils, before, to his parents' dismay, he began drumming on the gas cooker with a pair of knives and chipped off the paintwork. McBrain recalls that he was eleven or twelve before his father bought him his first drum kit, "which was basically one snare, one tom-tom, one cymbal, two drumsticks and a pair of brushes." He soon started playing Rolling Stones and Beatles covers with school bands, before he began regularly playing "pubs and weddings" by the age of 14.

McBrain had his nose broken in a fight at school which left him with his trademark flat features; he never underwent surgery to repair his nose.

== Musical career ==
McBrain's first "proper" band was "The 18th Fairfield Walk", later known as "Peyton Bond", a small pub band, which he decided was "never gonna go anywhere" as they only performed Otis Redding, The Beatles and The Who covers. McBrain soon left to join "The Wells Street Blues Band", which renamed themselves "The Axe" in 1969, a group which played their own material. This band split up after an argument between the singer and the guitarist, and McBrain began playing with Billy Day, a singer and keyboardist, and Michael "Mickey" Lesley, a guitarist, in 1971. At that point, he was known as "Nicky", a nickname given to him by his parents after his teddy bear, Nicholas, until an intoxicated Billy Day introduced him to Dick Asher, head of CBS Records, as "Neeko", while they were recording at CBS Studios, Whitfield Street. McBrain liked the name, changing it to Nicko "so that it sounded more English", and decided to keep it even after leaving the group. In 1973, McBrain performed on a single by Cockerel Chorus, "Nice One Cyril", on the label Young Blood.

Also in 1973, McBrain played on a self-titled album by guitarist Gordon Giltrap. This is notable not only as McBrain's album debut, but also because Giltrap in 1978 released an album called Fear of the Dark and used a font for his logo that is quite similar to the one used by Iron Maiden.

In 1975, he began playing with Streetwalkers, before joining Pat Travers, singer Jenny Darren, McKitty and then the French band, Trust, with whom he met Iron Maiden for the first time, while touring together in 1981. In 1982, the band asked McBrain to replace Clive Burr, and as news of Burr's departure had not yet been announced, McBrain made his first appearance with Iron Maiden on German TV disguised as Eddie. He formed a close partnership with bassist Steve Harris, and completed what many critics consider the band's "definitive" line-up, releasing a series of gold and platinum selling albums throughout the 1980s.

While the band's line-up went through several changes during the 1990s, McBrain remained in Iron Maiden, and since the return of Adrian Smith and Bruce Dickinson in 1999 the group has undergone a resurgence in popularity, and are now considered by some as "bigger than ever".

When he's not recording and touring with Iron Maiden, McBrain often plays with side projects including a band called McBrain Damage which played Iron Maiden covers. In March 2017, he was a guest drummer with the 8G Band on Late Night with Seth Meyers.

McBrain writes all the drum parts for Iron Maiden's songs. He received only one songwriting credit on an album, for "New Frontier", from 2003's Dance of Death, which expresses his opposition to human cloning, arising from his religious beliefs. He had previously received two songwriting credits for non-album tracks: 1984's "Mission From 'Arry", which was actually a recording of a backstage argument with Steve Harris, and 1992's "Nodding Donkey Blues", which were B-sides of the singles "2 Minutes to Midnight" and "Be Quick or Be Dead", respectively.

=== Retirement from touring ===
On 7 December 2024, McBrain announced his retirement from touring with Iron Maiden, with Dickinson stating that he still remains a member of the band. He played his final live performance with the band that same day in Sao Paulo, Brazil. Metal Injection called it "a major moment in metal history."

The band confirmed Nicko's live replacement to be Simon Dawson, who is the drummer for British Lion, Steve Harris' hard rock side project.

== Artistry ==
McBrain's drumming has been an important element of Iron Maiden's sound from 1983's Piece of Mind onwards, with guitarist Adrian Smith remarking that, "he always had the chops and the technique, but in Maiden he really exploded, to the point where a lot of stuff we did after he joined was then founded on his playing, all those busy patterns he does, displaying tremendous technique." As described in detail on the band's 2004 documentary, Piece of Mind's opening track, "Where Eagles Dare", famously displays McBrain's ability to use the single drum pedal very quickly, plus his rapid tom fills. In the 2008 Live After Death DVD, Steve Gadd, McBrain's then drum technician (not to be confused with the other one), comments that, on the World Slavery Tour, some drummers would refer to McBrain as an 'octopus' after witnessing the way in which his stamina gives him the ability to use all of his large signature drum kit in concert.

McBrain often employs the back end of his left hand drum stick to allow for more powerful "snare hits". He is known for not using a double bass pedal, with Bruce Dickinson commenting that he refused to use one on "Where Eagles Dare", considering them 'undrummerish'. He claims to have only ever used a double pedal once on "Face in the Sand", from Dance of Death, preferring to use a DW 5000 Accelerator single pedal. Since switching to the DW pedal in 2000, McBrain plays barefoot, stating that it gives him "more freedom."

Steve Harris remarks that "...he can play all kinds of music. Drummers from other bands sit round the back of him to see what he's doing, but he's got his kit set so he doesn't even look at what he's hitting half the time". After McBrain joined the band in 1982, Harris also noted how much easier playing with McBrain was for a songwriter, with Adrian Smith claiming that, "Steve loves playing with him. [They] used to work for hours going over these bass and drum patterns."

In 1988, McBrain collaborated with Andrew Chapman on a book entitled Iron Maiden & Nicko McBrain's Rhythms of the Beast, which was published by Warner Bros. Music in 1990. The book featured complete transcriptions of McBrain's drum work on twelve classic Iron Maiden songs, including six live versions as recorded on the band's 1985 album Live After Death. After selling internationally for several years, the book was taken out of print. Used copies are occasionally found for sale online.

In 1991, McBrain released an instructional drum video, entitled Rhythms of the Beast (not related to the above book of the same name), which was re-released on DVD in 2010. The video features McBrain demonstrating his technique, and covers tuning, soloing and parts of the drum kit.

== Awards, accolades and titles ==
Nicko McBrain is often considered among the best and most influential heavy metal/hard rock drummers of all time. In 2008, he was inducted into Guitar Centre's Drum Legends Hall of Fame and, in 2020, into the Modern Drummer Hall of Fame. A year later McBrain was inducted into Rhythm Magazine Hall of Fame.

In March 2024, McBrain performed in three concerts during the 52nd Mountbatten Festival of Music at the Royal Albert Hall. He stated that his involvement in this cultural event was a once-in-a-lifetime honour.

Since 2019, McBrain has been an International Brand Ambassador and Director of British Drum Company.

In 2016 McBrain and Iron Maiden were given the titles of Honorary Visitors of the Country Award in El Salvador. In 2019 McBrain and the rest of Iron Maiden all individually received the Relief Salon De Los Pasos Perdidos – State prize for their contribution to the development of Argentina’s culture and music. It was the first time it was awarded to artists outside of Argentina. In 2026, McBrain was inducted into the Rock and Roll Hall of Fame as a member of Iron Maiden.

As a member of Iron Maiden McBrain has received numerous nominations, honours and awards including Grammy Awards and equivalents awards in many countries, Brit Awards, Ivor Novello Awards, Rockbjörnen Awards,and Juno Awards. For his full list of awards with Iron Maiden see see List of awards and nominations received by Iron Maiden.

== Equipment ==
McBrain is a long-time user of Paiste cymbals and currently plays British Drum Company drums, moving from Sonor Drums and having previously endorsed Premier. For A Matter of Life and Death he used his Ludwig metal shell LM 402 snare drum which was purchased in 1975, making it the oldest drum in his kit. He endorses his own signature line of drum sticks made by Vic Firth. As of 2016, McBrain also uses Remo drumheads, Sonor hardware, an LP cowbell and a DW 9000 single pedal.

While touring in 1986–87, he played a Sonor Phonic Plus High Tech drum kit.

In 2010, McBrain used a Premier Elite drum kit. In 2016, McBrain played on a Sonor SQ² Custom drum kit made of beech, with a snare drum of birch.

In 2022, McBrain announced his new endorsement with the British Drum Company (or BDC).

In 2023, McBrain announced his switch from Remo drumheads to Code drumheads.

== Personal life ==
McBrain is married to Rebecca McBrain (née Dempsey) and has two sons from his first marriage, born 1983 and 1992. He lives in Boca Raton, Florida.

McBrain converted to Christianity in 1999 after an experience in the Spanish River Church, near his Boca Raton home. His wife, Rebecca, had been asking him to attend with her, and upon entering the church, McBrain soon found himself crying as he experienced a "calling". Recounting the tale, he said "I just sat there thinking, 'I didn't drink last night... why can't I stand?' I had this love affair with Jesus going on in my heart."

In 1988, McBrain appeared as a guest on The Sooty Show, in which he played drums with Sooty and Sweep. In reference to his appearance on the show, McBrain's drum kit has since been decorated with a Sooty puppet, which is often dressed accordingly with the band's corresponding tours.

McBrain has a pilot's licence, for which he has a twin engine rating.

In 2003, McBrain was arrested prior to an Iron Maiden show in Wantagh, New York. While pulling into the venue's VIP parking lot, an attendant asked for McBrain's credentials. Following a misunderstanding, McBrain threatened to drive into the attendant, and did so twice, injuring the attendant on the second attempt. McBrain was arrested and charged with third-degree assault and second-degree reckless endangerment. He was released on an appearance ticket, allowing him to perform in the show.

In 2009, he opened a restaurant called Rock 'N' Roll Ribs in Coral Springs, Florida. The restaurant received positive reviews on an episode of Check, Please! South Florida and was awarded "Best Ribs of 2012" by New Times Broward-Palm Beach.

McBrain is a fan of snooker and has attended the World Snooker Championships at the Crucible Theatre, Sheffield. He enjoys playing golf in his spare time, along with his bandmate Dave Murray, and is a friend of Swedish golfer and Florida resident Jesper Parnevik, whom he met at Ullna Golf Club in Sweden.

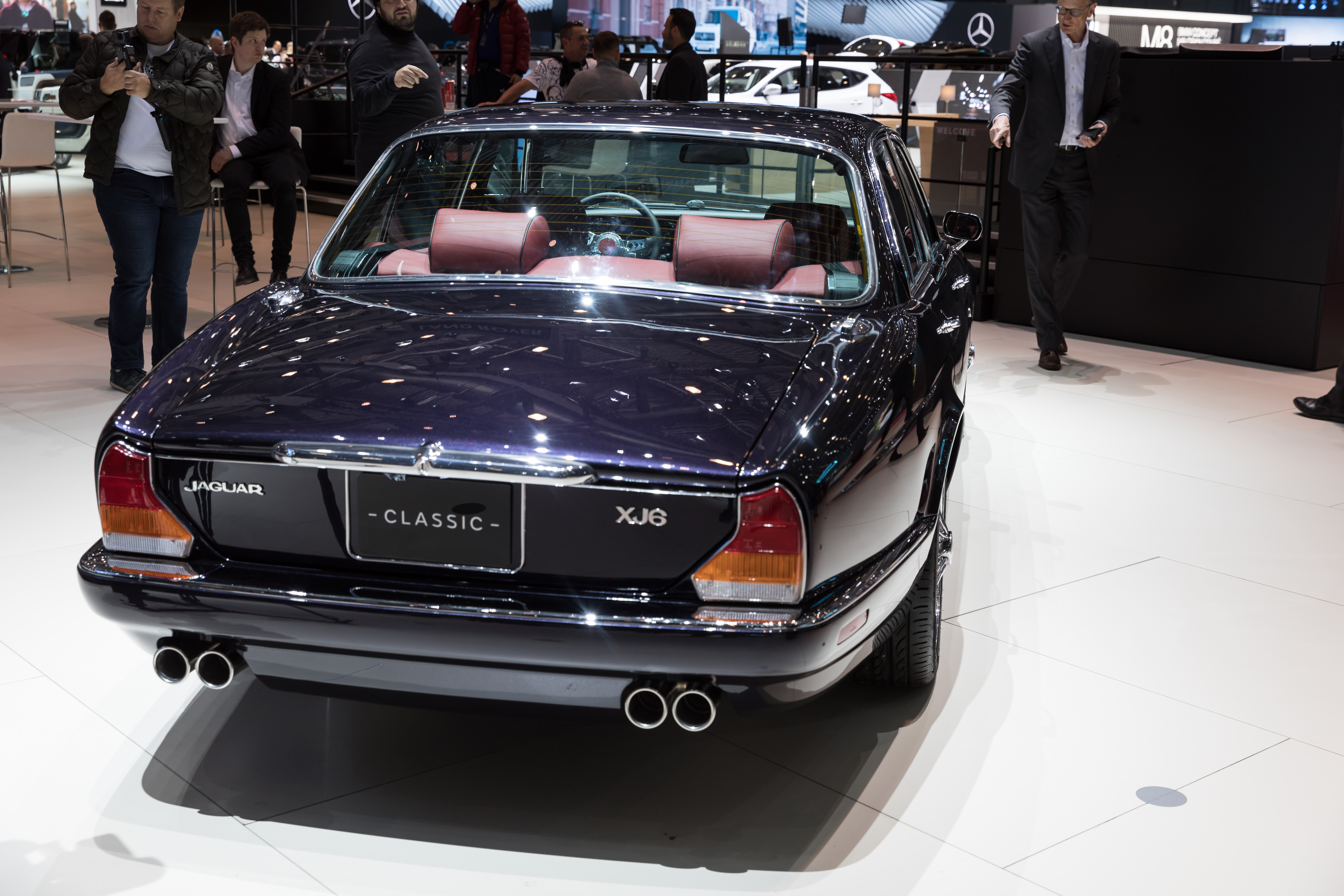
Jaguar XJ6 Greatest Hits customised for McBrain

McBrain is an enthusiast of Jaguar Cars, and bought a custom XKR-S model built to his specifications in 2012. In March 2018, Jaguar Land Rover Classic Works revealed a customised Jaguar XJ Series III for McBrain.

In 2015, McBrain stopped drinking alcohol after seeing an interview in which he had had too much wine and has remained sober.

In 2018, he launched a musical instrument store named Drum One in Manchester, England. The retailer specialises in drum kits and related merchandise. To promote the launch of the store, McBrain conducted an interview with Deep Purple drummer Ian Paice.

On 3 August 2023, McBrain released a statement via the bands' YouTube page, explaining in a video that he had been unwell in January 2023. It was explained further in the video description that McBrain suffered from a stroke in January and was paralyzed on his right side from the shoulder down. After 10 weeks of intensive physical therapy, McBrain was able to join the rest of the band at rehearsals in May 2023, ahead of their European leg of the Future Past World Tour. Manager Rod Smallwood put out a statement saying that "The rest of the band and l think that what Nicko has been able to achieve since his stroke shows incredible belief and willpower and we are all very proud of him. With this new and musically very complex set to learn ahead of him, he just got his head down and concentrated on recovery. We honestly did not know if he would be able to play a whole show until band rehearsals started in May and there was just so much support for him from the band and then genuine relief for all when we saw he was going to be able to do it!".

In October 2026, he stated that he was "not politically inclined" but believed that president Donald Trump and secretary of defense Pete Hegseth should be jailed.

== Discography ==
Cockerel Chorus

- Nice One Cyril (1973)

Gordon Giltrap

- Giltrap (1973)

Streetwalkers

- Downtown Flyers (1975)
- Red Card (1976)

Pat Travers

- Makin' Magic (1977)
- Putting It Straight (1977)

Jenny Darren

- Jenny Darren (1980)

Trust

- Marche ou Crève (Original French Release)/Savage (English Language Version) (1981)

WhoCares

- "Out of My Mind" (2011)

Solo

- Rhythms of the Beast (instructional drum video) (1991)

Iron Maiden

Main article: Iron Maiden discography
- Piece of Mind (1983)
- Powerslave (1984)
- Somewhere in Time (1986)
- Seventh Son of a Seventh Son (1988)
- No Prayer for the Dying (1990)
- Fear of the Dark (1992)
- The X Factor (1995)
- Virtual XI (1998)
- Brave New World (2000)
- Dance of Death (2003)
- A Matter of Life and Death (2006)
- The Final Frontier (2010)
- The Book of Souls (2015)
- Senjutsu (2021)

Smith/Kotzen

- Smith/Kotzen (2021)

== Literature ==
- Budofsky, Adam; Heusel, Michele; Dawson, Michael Ray; Parillo, Michael (2006). The Drummer. Hal Leonard Corporation. ISBN 978-1-4234-0567-2.
- Wall, Mick (2004). Iron Maiden: Run to the Hills, the Authorised Biography (third ed.). Sanctuary Publishing. ISBN 1-86074-542-3.
- "Juno Winners – 2010 Gala Dinner & Awards". Juno Awards. 18 April 2010. Archived from the original on 26 April 2012.
- "Iron Maiden honoured with Ivor Novello award". Sanctuary Group. 18 September 2002. Archived from the original (Official Website) on 10 March 2007.
