= En Vivo! (Iron Maiden album) =

Live album and video by Iron Maiden
- Released: 26 March 2012
- Recorded: 10 April 2011
- Venue: Estadio Nacional, Santiago, Chile
- Genre: Heavy metal
- Length: 108:16
- Label: EMI
- Director: Andy Matthews
- Producer: Kevin Shirley

Iron Maiden chronology
From Fear to Eternity (2011)	En Vivo! (2012)	Maiden England '88 (2013)

Iron Maiden video chronology
Iron Maiden: Flight 666 (2009)	En Vivo! (2012)	Maiden England '88 (2013)

Alternative cover
- DVD cover

En Vivo! (Spanish for "live") is a live album and video by English heavy metal band Iron Maiden. Filmed by Banger Films during The Final Frontier World Tour at Estadio Nacional, Santiago, Chile on 10 April 2011 and directed by Andy Matthews, it was released worldwide on 26 March 2012, 23 March in Australia, 27 March in the United States and Canada and 28 March in Japan.

Met with a generally positive critical response, the video counterpart includes a feature-length behind-the-scenes documentary and peaked at No. 1 in the Australian, Austrian, Finnish, German, Hungarian, Norwegian, Spanish, Swedish and UK Music Video Charts.

== Background ==
The intention to release a live document from The Final Frontier World Tour was first announced in the press release for the From Fear to Eternity compilation on 15 March 2011, in which the band's manager, Rod Smallwood, reported that the concerts in Santiago, Chile and Buenos Aires, Argentina were being filmed for a DVD release. On 7 April, Banger Films, the same production company behind the 2009 documentary, Iron Maiden: Flight 666, announced that they would be filming both concerts, and reportedly used 22 HD cameras and an octocam (a flying camera which captures aerial crowd scenes). On top of this, the band transported a gigantic stage prop of their mascot, Eddie, to South America specially for the recording, which, according to bassist and primary songwriter Steve Harris, "wasn’t due to make his appearance until our European leg of the tour later in 2011."

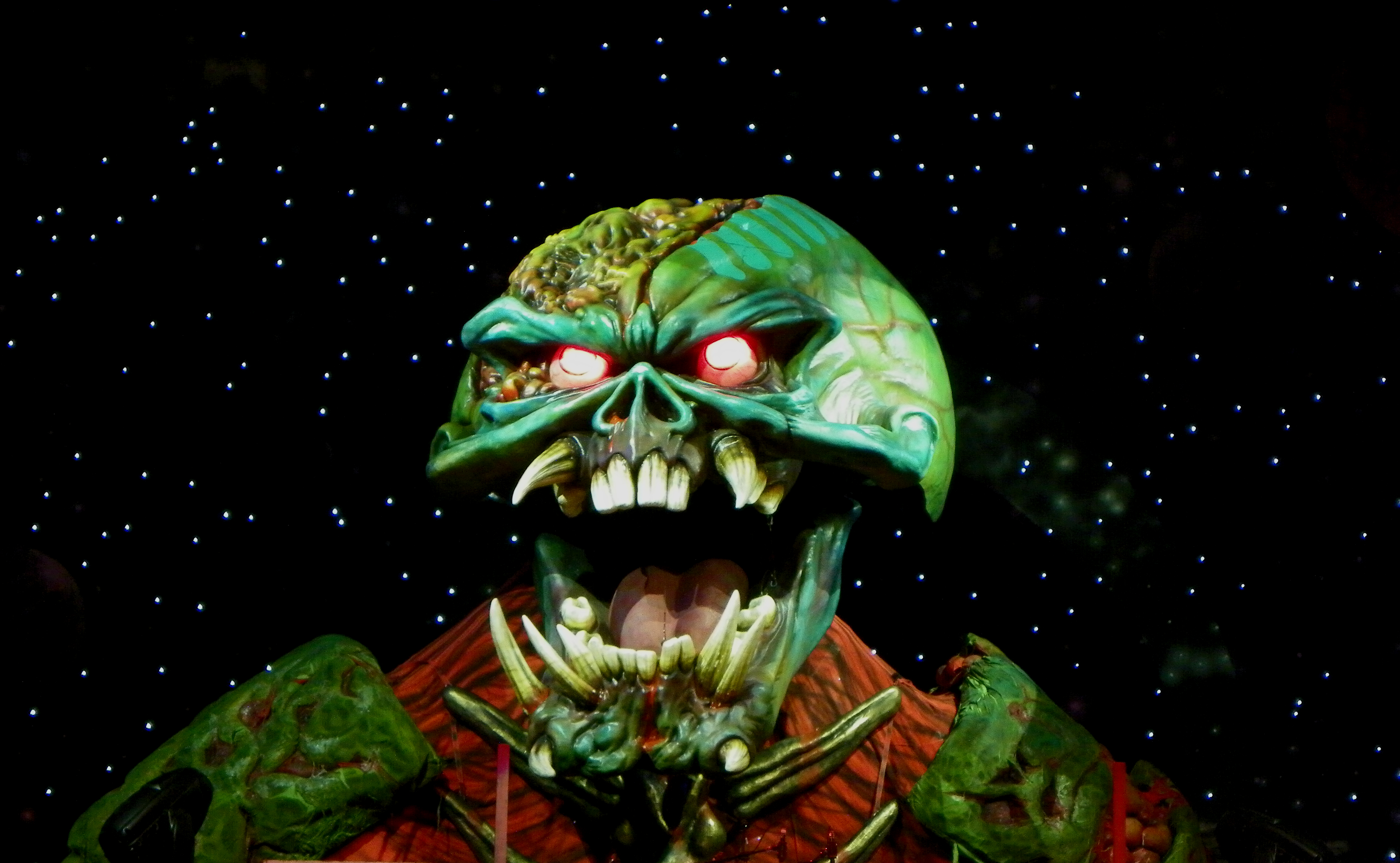
A gigantic Eddie stage prop was shipped to South America to appear in the video.

The release date, title and artwork were disclosed on 17 January 2012 as well as the news that it would also be available on Blu-ray, CD and LP (as well as the aforementioned DVD format, released in standard and special "steel book" editions). In addition, the band confirmed that they had chosen their performance in Chile as the main basis for the release, with Harris commenting, "After much consideration, we chose the Santiago show as we felt it was one of our best performances of the entire tour and to play at the prestigious Estadio Nacional was a landmark moment for us." Furthermore, the press release reported that the video will include the use of split screens, with director Andy Matthews later commenting that "Split screens are a way of showing several pieces of action at the same time. With Maiden, you have a dramatic wide shot of the stage, as well as six bandmembers, Eddie and an amazing crowd! We used this technique as so much is going on."

Accompanying the concert footage, the Blu-ray and DVD releases include an 88-minute "behind the scenes" documentary, entitled "Behind The Beast", featuring interviews with members of the band and crew, documenting the entire Ed Force One leg of The Final Frontier World Tour. Speaking about the documentary, Matthews explained that "I wanted to give a first-hand idea of exactly what goes on behind the scenes to put on an Iron Maiden show. I had 24-hour access to all that happens, as it happened, and it was a great pleasure to convey all the hard work and fun that goes into it. There are so many fascinating logistics involved." The special features section also includes the promo music video to "Satellite 15... The Final Frontier", with an accompanying "making of" film, and the tour's intro video in its entirety.

On 6 December 2012, one song from the release ("Blood Brothers") was nominated for a Grammy Award for Best Hard Rock/Metal Performance.

== Critical reception ==
Professional ratings
Review scores
Source	Rating
About.com	4.5/5 stars
AllMusic	3.5/5 stars
Classic Rock	6/10
Consequence of Sound	C+
Kerrang!	4/5
Metal Hammer	8/10

En Vivo! was met with generally positive reviews and received an 8 out of 10 rating from Metal Hammer, who stated that "the sound is a vividly punchy affair, while the visuals have clearly been captured by a small army of cameramen," although also commenting that the use of split screen "occasionally borders on overload." Kerrang! gave it 4 out of 5, deeming it "a classic Maiden set," while describing the band as "metal's greatest, most rewarding live band." About.com scored it 4.5/5, describing it as "flawlessly shot," "skillfully edited" and that "the audio is also pristine." Both AllMusic and Consequence of Sound graded it 3.5/5 and commented on how "material both new and old... [integrate]... seamlessly into each other," while Consequence of Sound concluded that "En Vivo! is proof positive that six men in their 50s can still rock with the best of them."

Classic Rock were more mixed towards the release, awarding it just 6 out of 10 and, although stating that "The 50,000 strong audience is, as expected, very loud and excitable. And the band's performance is, as usual, quite brilliant," argued that "Maiden's first live album, the epochal Live After Death, could never be topped."

The "Behind the Beast" documentary was also praised, with Metal Hammer remarking, "Amusing, educating and endearing by turns, it adds a fascinating angle to the actual show and highlights some of the unsung heroes of the rock world," while About.com deemed it "a fascinating look in how a tour of this magnitude is executed." Kerrang! were more critical, however, stating that "the awesomeness... depends on how much of a Maiden nut you are, and how interesting you find footage of blokes plugging cables into sockets."

== Track listing ==
En Vivo! – Disc one
No.	Title	Writer(s)	Original release	Length
1.	"Satellite 15"	Adrian Smith; Steve Harris	The Final Frontier (2010)	4:36
2.	"The Final Frontier"	Smith; Harris	The Final Frontier (2010)	4:10
3.	"El Dorado"	Smith; Harris; Bruce Dickinson	The Final Frontier (2010)	5:52
4.	"2 Minutes to Midnight"	Smith; Dickinson	Powerslave (1984)	5:50
5.	"The Talisman"	Janick Gers; Harris	The Final Frontier (2010)	8:45
6.	"Coming Home"	Smith; Harris; Dickinson	The Final Frontier (2010)	5:57
7.	"Dance of Death"	Gers; Harris	Dance of Death (2003)	9:03
8.	"The Trooper"	Harris	Piece of Mind (1983)	3:59
9.	"The Wicker Man"	Smith; Harris; Dickinson	Brave New World (2000)	5:06
Total length:				53:18

En Vivo! – Disc two
No.	Title	Writer(s)	Original release	Length
1.	"Blood Brothers"	Harris	Brave New World (2000)	7:04
2.	"When the Wild Wind Blows"	Harris	The Final Frontier (2010)	10:37
3.	"The Evil That Men Do"	Smith; Dickinson; Harris	Seventh Son of a Seventh Son (1988)	4:17
4.	"Fear of the Dark"	Harris	Fear of the Dark (1992)	7:30
5.	"Iron Maiden"	Harris	Iron Maiden (1980)	5:08
6.	"The Number of the Beast"	Harris	The Number of the Beast (1982)	4:57
7.	"Hallowed Be Thy Name"	Harris	The Number of the Beast (1982)	7:28
8.	"Running Free"	Harris; Paul Di'Anno	Iron Maiden (1980)	7:57
Total length:				54:58

=== Blu-ray/DVD bonus features ===
- "Behind the Beast" documentary
- "Satellite 15...The Final Frontier" promo video (director's cut)
- The Making of "Satellite 15...The Final Frontier promo"
- The Final Frontier World Tour Show Intro

== Personnel ==
Production and performance credits are adapted from the album liner notes, Blu-ray cover, and AllMusic.

Iron Maiden

- Bruce Dickinson – vocals
- Dave Murray – guitars
- Janick Gers – guitars
- Adrian Smith – guitars, backing vocals
- Steve Harris – bass, backing vocals, co-producer (concert audio), executive producer
- Nicko McBrain – drums

Additional musician

- Michael Kenney – keyboards

Production

- Andy Matthews – director, post-production
- Kevin Shirley – producer, engineer, mixing
- George Marino – mastering
- Tony Newton – audio recording
- Jared Kvitka – assistant engineer
- Peacock – art direction, cover illustration, design
- Melvyn Grant – cover illustration
- Daniel Reed – cover illustration
- John McMurtrie – photography
- Rod Smallwood – management, executive producer
- Andy Taylor – management, executive producer

== Chart performance ==
=== Album ===
Country	Chart (2012)	Peak position
Australia	ARIA	97
Austria	Ö3 Austria Top 40	17
Belgium (Flanders)	Ultratop	44
Belgium (Wallonia)	Ultratop	39
Canada	Canadian Albums Chart	39
Finland	The Official Finnish Charts	8
France	SNEP	24
Germany	Media Control Charts	4
Greece	IFPI Greece	5
Hungary	Mahasz	13
Ireland	Irish Albums Chart	64
Italy	FIMI	17
Japan	Oricon	111
Netherlands	MegaCharts	42
Norway	VG-lista	16
Poland	Polish Music Charts	25
Scotland	Official Charts Company	17
Spain	PROMUSICAE	18
Sweden	Sverigetopplistan	11
Switzerland	Swiss Hitparade	19
United Kingdom	Official Albums Chart	19
United States	Billboard 200	80

=== Video ===
Country	Chart (2012)	Peak position
Australia	ARIA	1
Austria	Ö3 Austria Top 10 DVD	1
Belgium (Flanders)	Ultratop	4
Belgium (Wallonia)	Ultratop	3
Denmark	Tracklisten	1
Finland	The Official Finnish Charts	1
France	SNEP	2
Germany	Media Control Charts	1
Hungary	Mahasz	1
Italy	FIMI	2
Japan	Oricon	61
Netherlands	MegaCharts	2
Norway	VG-lista	1
Portugal	AFP	3
Spain	PROMUSICAE	1
Sweden	Sverigetopplistan	1
Switzerland	Swiss Hitparade	2
United Kingdom	UK Blu-ray Chart	11
United Kingdom	UK Music Video Chart	1
Country	Chart (2013)	Peak position
Italy	FIMI	1

== Certifications ==
=== Video ===
Country	Certification	Sales
Australia	Gold	7,500+
Canada	2× Platinum	20,000+
France	Gold	7,500+
Germany	Gold	25,000+
Poland	Gold	5,000+
United States	Platinum	100,000+
