= Eddie (Iron Maiden) =

Heavy metal band mascot

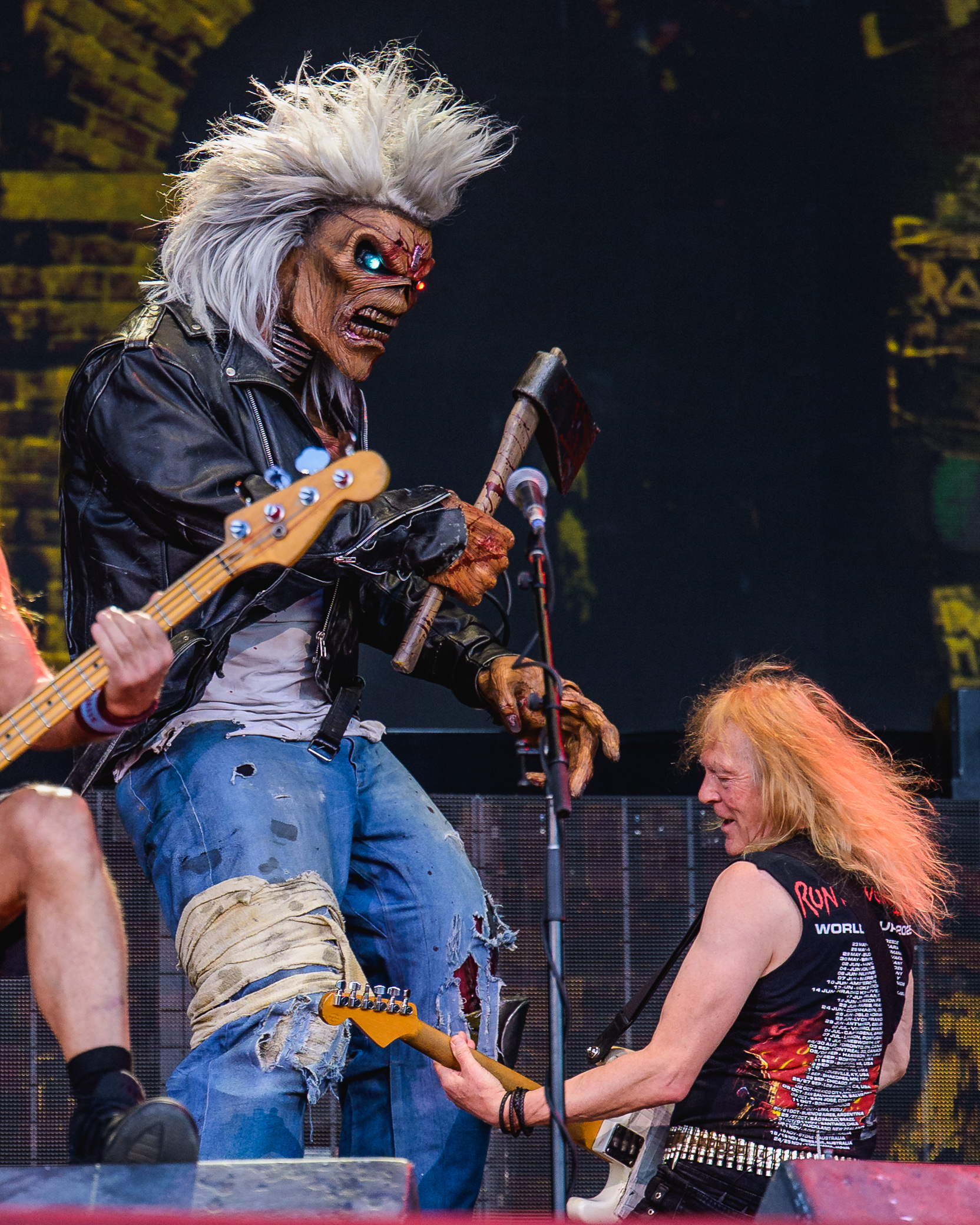
- Eddie attacking Janick Gers on stage at the Tons of Rock festival in Oslo, 2026
- First appearance: 8 February 1980
- Created by: Derek Riggs

In-universe information
- Alias: Eddie the Head
- Gender: Male
- Occupation: Band mascot
- Nationality: British

Eddie (also known as Eddie the Head) is the mascot for the English heavy metal band Iron Maiden. He is a perennial fixture of the group's artwork, appearing in all of their album covers (as well as most of their singles) and in their merchandise, which includes T-shirts, posters and action figures. On top of this, Eddie features in all of the band's concerts, as well as in the first-person shooter video game, Ed Hunter, the mobile game, Iron Maiden: Legacy of the Beast and a pinball game with the same name in 2018.

Originally a papier-mâché mask used in Iron Maiden's stage backdrop, the band transferred the name "Eddie" from the mask to an illustration by Derek Riggs, which was used as the band's debut album cover. Although he is occasionally described as "zombie-like" in the press, Eddie assumes a different guise relating to the themes of individual albums and their corresponding world tours, and has appeared as a cyborg, an Egyptian mummy, a lobotomised mental patient, a cloud, a samurai warrior, and a soldier.

== Background ==
The first version of Eddie was a mask made by art student David Arthur Brown who was friends with Dave "Lights" Beazley, then in charge of lighting, pyrotechnics and other effects for Iron Maiden's live show. According to Beazley, the original mask was a papier-mâché mould of his own face, which was then used in the band's backdrop, consisting of lights and the band's logo, although, the very earliest versions of the mask were made of vacuum-formed plastic, produced from the plaster cast of a student, made in 1978 at East Ham College of Technology. The thin plastic masks were too fragile to last and were human-sized, so were later replaced as Eddie developed into a literally larger-than-life character. At the end of their live set, during the "Iron Maiden" song, a fish tank pump was used to squirt fake blood out of the mask's mouth, which typically covered their then-drummer Doug Sampson. After this initial incarnation, Beazley constructed a larger mask out of fibreglass, equipped with flashing eyes and the ability to release red smoke from its mouth.

The band's bassist and founding member Steve Harris states that the name "Eddie" comes from the original mask being referred to as "The Head," which sounded like "Ead" in the band members' London accent. According to guitarist Dave Murray the name was also inspired by an old joke:

"A wife had a baby, but it was born with only a head and no body. 'Don't worry,' says the doctor. 'Bring him back in five years time, and we'll probably have a body for him.' So five years go by, and there's Eddie the 'Ead, as his parents have called him, sitting on the mantelpiece, when in walks his dad. 'Son,' he says, 'today's a very special day. It's your fifth birthday, and we've got a very special surprise for you.' 'Oh no,' says Eddie. 'Not another fucking hat!'"

Once Iron Maiden had secured a record contract with EMI, the band's manager Rod Smallwood decided that the band needed "that one figure who utterly stamped his presence and image on the band in a way that was obvious enough to make a good album cover." After seeing some of his artwork on a Max Middleton poster, Smallwood set up a meeting with Derek Riggs and asked to see some of his other illustrations, in the midst of which was the band's first album cover. Originally created as an idea for a punk record (which Riggs states in the 12 Wasted Years documentary was based on an alleged Japanese soldier's skull stuck to an American tank), the band had extra hair added to the illustration, making it more suitable to their style of music, and transferred the name from the original masks they used onstage. Surmising that the creature had "great visual continuity," Smallwood decided it would be used for all of the band's artwork.

Smallwood claims that Rupert Perry, EMI's then-managing director, came up with the idea that Eddie could become a more active part of the band's concerts, originally portrayed by Smallwood himself, wearing an Eddie mask and a leather jacket. The classic "walk-on" Eddie was created for The Beast on the Road tour by Dave Beazley after seeing a pantomime version of Jack and the Beanstalk, which used similar giants, consisting of "basically a bloke on stilts but dressed up to look about ten feet (3 m) tall." As the band's stage show expanded, an additional gigantic Eddie was also incorporated at the back of the set during "Iron Maiden," which, like the "walk-on" Eddie, would match the theme of the current tour, such as the 30-foot (9 m), mummified version used during the World Slavery Tour, which shot sparks from its eyes.

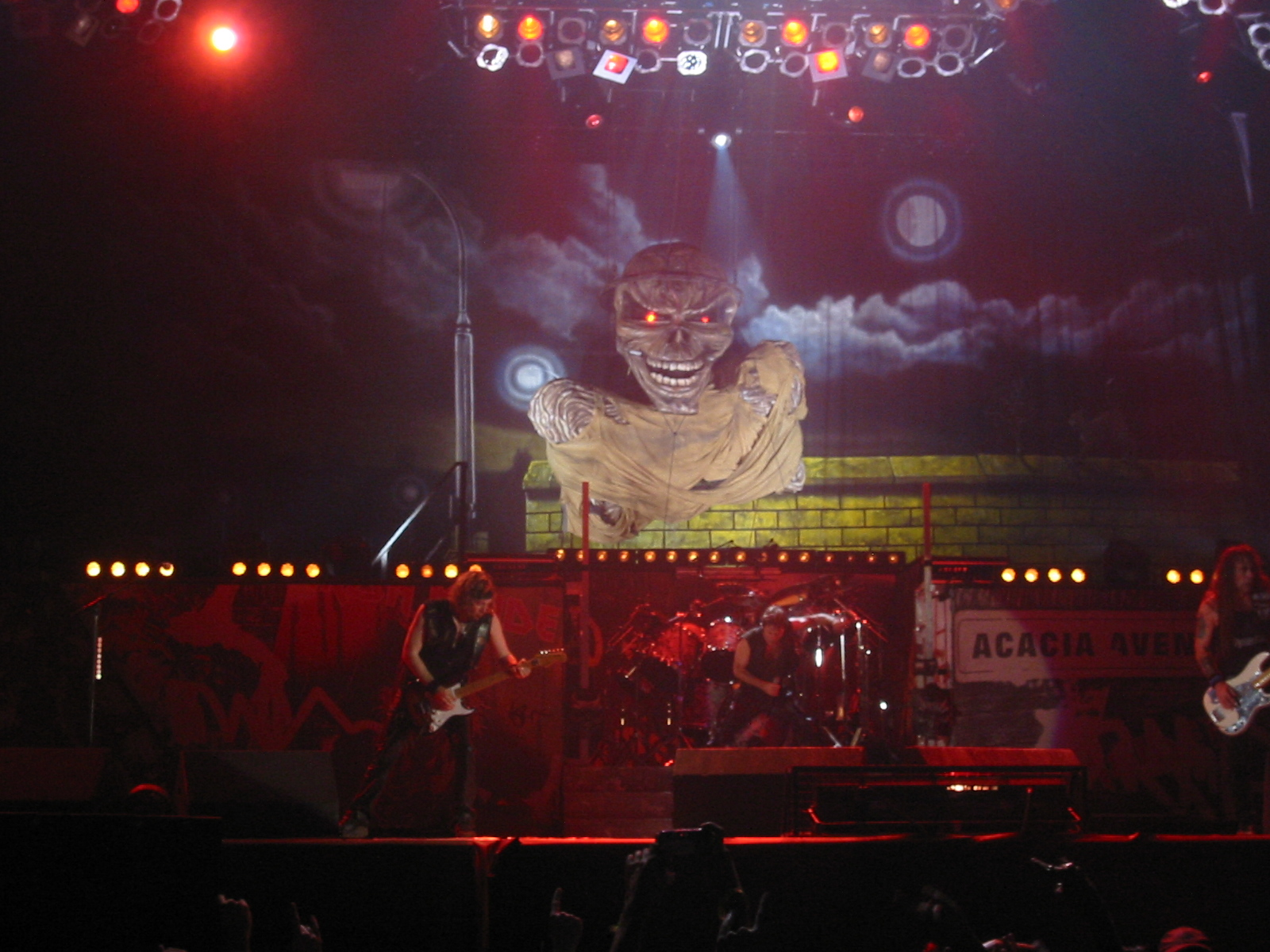
The "Extra-large" Eddie used during the Eddie Rips Up the World Tour

Eddie's debut appearance was on the band's first single cover, "Running Free," in which his face was covered by a shadow to protect his identity before the release of the band's first album. Since then, Eddie has assumed a different guise for each cover, such as a "mummified Egyptian god" for Powerslave, a lobotomized mental patient for Piece of Mind, emerging from a grave in Live After Death, a tree monster for Fear of the Dark and a cyborg for Somewhere in Time. In addition to the band's album covers and live shows, the character also appears in merchandise including T-shirts, posters and action figures, as well as the group's two video games: the 1999 first-person shooter, Ed Hunter, and the 2016 role-playing game Iron Maiden: Legacy of the Beast. On top of this, Eddie is featured as an unlockable character in Tony Hawk's Pro Skater 4 and as Legendary skins in Dead by Daylight.

== Controversies ==
Some of the band's artworks have proved controversial, such as the cover of "Sanctuary," in which Eddie is standing over the corpse of Margaret Thatcher. It was claimed that Iron Maiden were banned from releasing the single without censoring the cover, blacking out Thatcher's face, although Riggs has since claimed that this was fabricated by the band's management to gain publicity in the British tabloids.

The artwork for the band's third album, The Number of the Beast, depicted Eddie controlling Satan like a marionette. Originally created by Riggs for the "Purgatory" single cover, but deemed too good by Smallwood and withheld for the next studio release, the image, along with the record's title track, led to the Moral Majority labelling Iron Maiden as Satanists and organizing public burnings of their back-catalogue in the United States, which in turn gave them a large amount of publicity.

During the course of the Troubles in Northern Ireland, Eddie, specifically as he appeared on the sleeve of "The Trooper", became an unofficial mascot of the Ulster Freedom Fighters loyalist paramilitary group and was the main figure on a number of the group's murals. During The Final Frontier World Tour in 2011, after Iron Maiden did not perform "The Trooper" in Belfast, Blabbermouth.net reported that there had been speculation amongst fans that this was due to the artwork's use in murals.

One last uproar that Eddie caused was when a picture representing him biting off Ozzy Osbourne's head (in response to Osbourne's biting the head off a live bat on stage) went unappreciated by those in Osbourne's camp; therefore, Maiden withdrew the drawing.

== Recognition ==
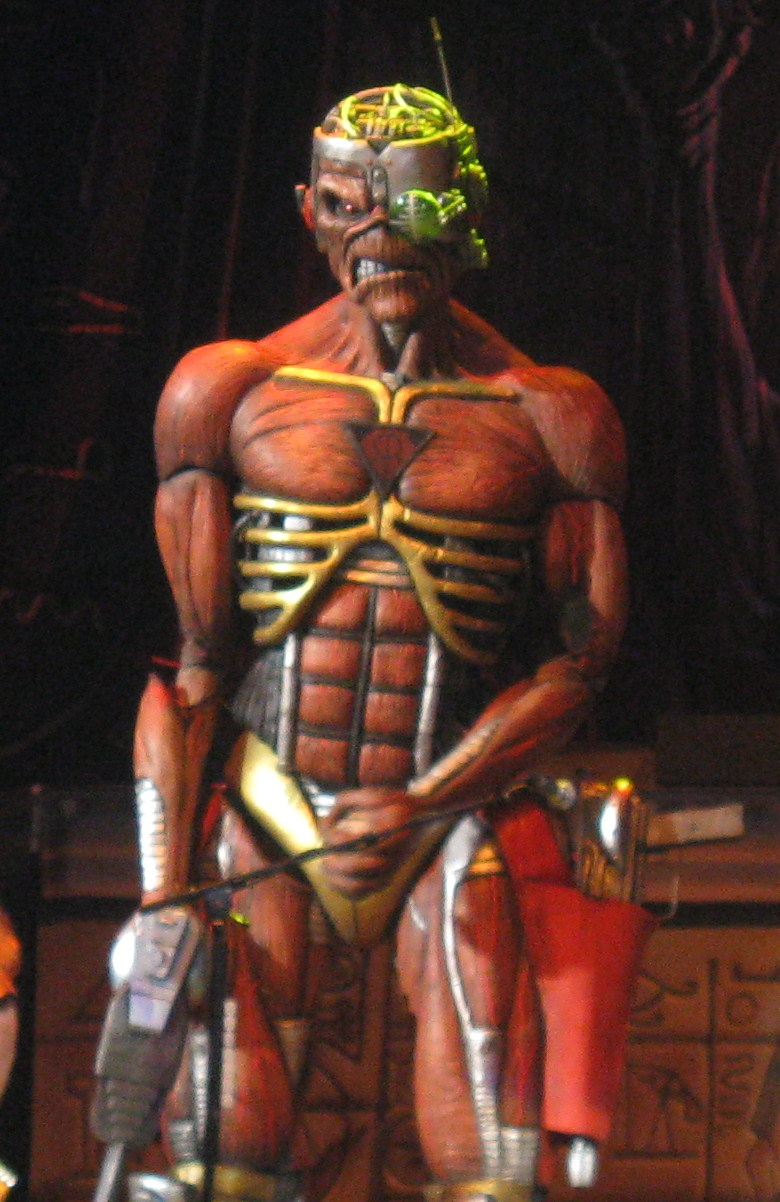
Eddie during the Somewhere Back in Time World Tour

Gibson.com described Eddie in 2008 as "the most recognizable metal icon in the world and one of the most versatile too," while in 2009, Gigwise called him "perhaps the most enduring band mascot of all time." Many artists who have been influenced by Iron Maiden hold their artwork in high regard, with Joey Jordison, former member of Slipknot commenting that he bought his first album "on the strength of the cover alone" and Corey Taylor, also of Slipknot, stating that "there wasn't a dude that I hung out with that wasn't trying to draw Eddie on their schoolbooks." Steve-O, from Jackass, says that they have "the coolest album covers in the music industry" and Lars Ulrich, of Metallica, comments that "they had the best packaging, the coolest T-shirts — everything." Mick Wall describes Eddie as "the immortal soul of Iron Maiden, the defining symbol of the eternally youthful, blissfully uncompromising spirit of the band's music."

In 2008, Eddie won the "Icon Award" at the Metal Hammer Golden Gods Awards.

In 2023, Eddie was featured on a series of commemorative stamps issued by the Royal Mail.

In 2024, online horror game Dead by Daylight added multiple incarnations of Eddie as Legendary cosmetics, these are based on Powerslave, Stranger in a Strange Land and Senjutsu. An Eddie based off multiple different incarnations, which include The Trooper, The X Factor and The Evil That Men Do, was also added. Additionally in 2026, the Eddie featured on the Run for Your Lives World Tour was added.

== Other artists ==
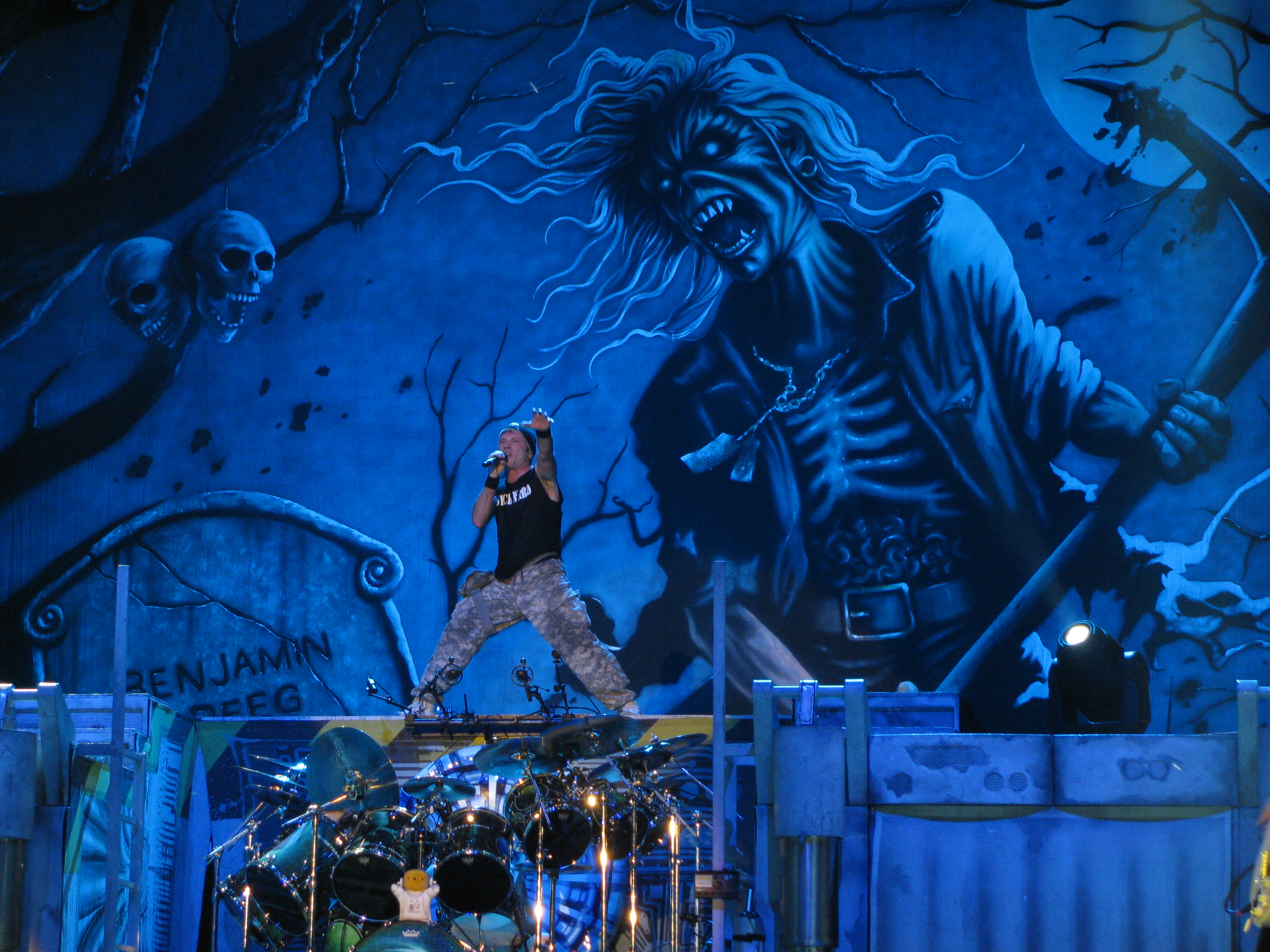
"The Reincarnation of Benjamin Breeg" backdrop, featuring Eddie, during The Final Frontier World Tour

From 1980 onwards, the band's Eddie artwork was provided exclusively by Derek Riggs until 1992, when the band decided to accept contributions from other artists, with Smallwood explaining that they "wanted to upgrade Eddie for the '90s. We wanted to take him from this sort of comic-book horror creature and turn him into something a bit more straightforward so that he became even more threatening." Since then, Riggs has contributed much less to the band's artwork, creating part of one studio album, one single and two compilation covers, while the band have employed a number of different artists:

- Melvyn Grant first drew Eddie for the Fear of the Dark sleeve, the first time anyone other than Riggs had designed a cover for Iron Maiden in which Eddie was pictured. Grant also worked on the Virtual XI, Death on the Road, "The Reincarnation of Benjamin Breeg", The Final Frontier and From Fear to Eternity covers.

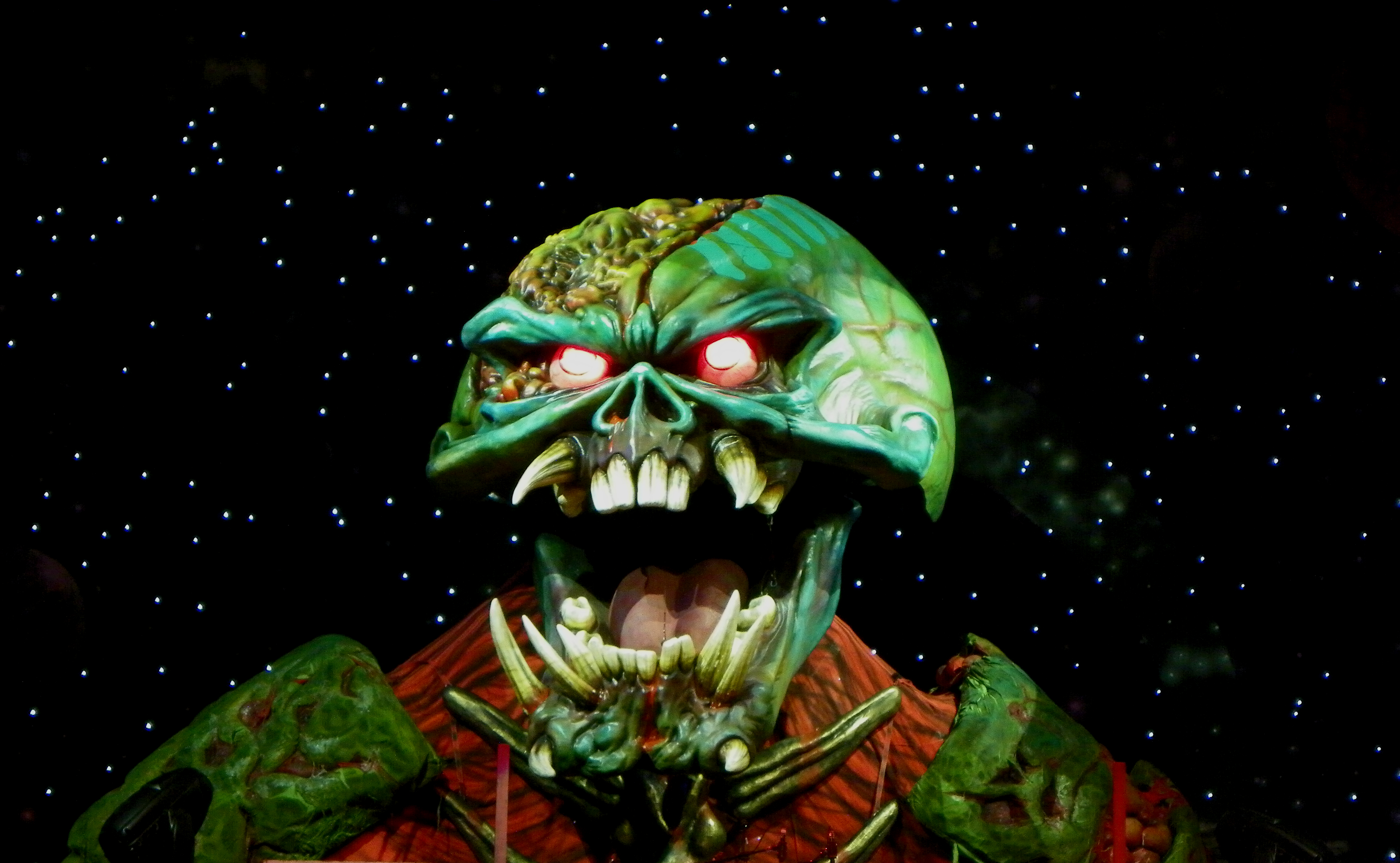
Melvyn Grant's The Final Frontier version of Eddie during The Final Frontier World Tour

- Mark Wilkinson depicted Eddie as a bat for the poster of their 1992 Monsters of Rock appearance, which was later used for the cover of the Live at Donington remaster. Wilkinson has also contributed to "The Wicker Man" and "Out of the Silent Planet" singles, as well as the Best of the 'B' Sides compilation, the 2015 studio album, The Book of Souls, and the 2021 studio album, Senjutsu.
- Hugh Syme, noted for both his album cover work and guest musician appearances for the Canadian progressive rock band Rush, provided the modelled artwork for The X Factor.
- Tom Adams provided the artwork to Edward the Great, showing Eddie as a King on a throne.
- Director Bob Cesca of Camp Chaos created animations of various past Eddie incarnations for new versions of the "Aces High", "The Number of the Beast", "The Wicker Man", "Flight of Icarus", "Run to the Hills" and "The Trooper" music videos, included in the Visions of the Beast DVD.

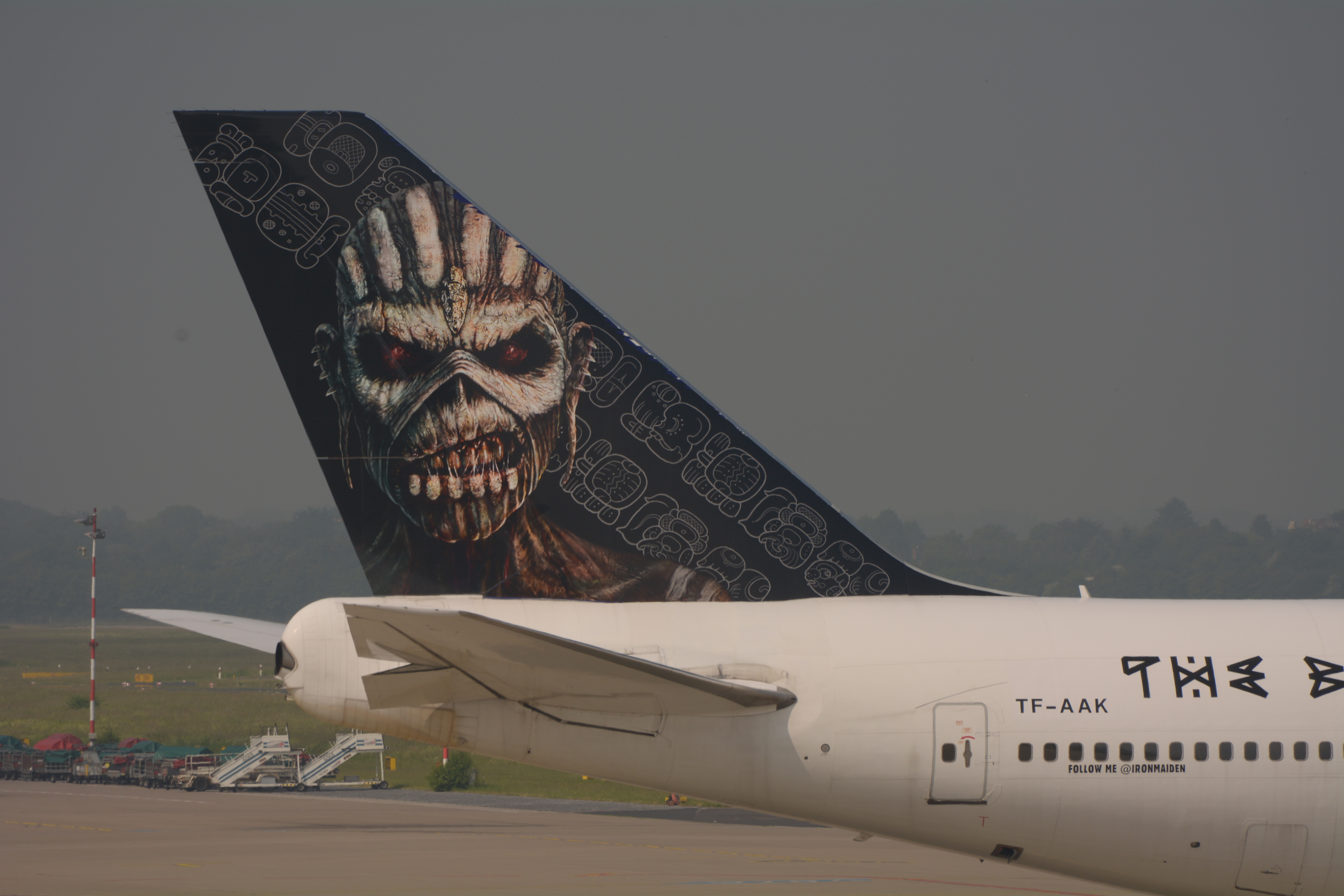
Mark Wilkinson's The Book of Souls Eddie as it appears on the band's Boeing 747, Ed Force One

- Although not listed on the record's release, the From Fear to Eternity album sleeve credits David Patchett with creating the Dance of Death cover. According to MusicRadar, Patchett asked for his name to be removed from the album's credits after the band decided to use an unfinished version of his design. The artwork was negatively received, with Sputnikmusic deeming it "terrible".
- Tim Bradstreet, best known for his contributions to The Punisher comics, created the cover of A Matter of Life and Death.
- Anthony Dry created the "El Dorado" and "The Final Frontier" radio promo covers, featuring Melvyn Grant's The Final Frontier Eddie in a comic book cover style.

== Various incarnations ==
- Iron Maiden, the first artwork featuring Eddie, originally created for a possible punk record, based on an American's head allegedly stuck to a Vietnamese tank.
  - "Running Free," the band's first release to depict Eddie, painted after the album cover so his face was hidden to protect his identity.
  - "Sanctuary" shows Eddie wielding a knife above Margaret Thatcher's corpse. According to Riggs, the band's management censored the image themselves to gain publicity.
  - "Women in Uniform," according to Riggs, features Margaret Thatcher about to get "her own back" on Eddie, as she is seen waiting around a corner with a machine gun in her hands while Eddie approaches accompanied by two women.
- Killers features Eddie with an axe and his victim clawing at his shirt. Based on a block of flats in which Riggs lived at the time, it contains several references to the band, such as "Ruskin Arms" and "Charlotte the Harlot".
  - "Twilight Zone" features Eddie's spirit reaching toward a woman through a mirror. According to Iron Maiden manager Rod Smallwood, the band was criticized because Eddie appeared to be attacking the woman.
  - "Purgatory" depicts the devil's face crumbling away to reveal Eddie.
- Maiden Japan shows Eddie with a samurai sword. The cover was painted at short notice as the original, featuring Eddie decapitating Paul Di'Anno, was withdrawn because the band was considering replacing him.
- The Number of the Beast depicts Eddie controlling the devil like a puppet, who, in turn, also controls a puppet Eddie, causing controversy with American evangelists. Originally painted for the "Purgatory" song, Smallwood withheld the artwork for the following album, deeming it too good for a single.
  - "Run to the Hills" shows Eddie fighting Satan with a Native American tomahawk, a reference to the song itself.
  - "The Number of the Beast" single cover shows Eddie holding the devil's severed head, which Riggs claims was meant to look like Salvador Dalí.
- Piece of Mind depicts a lobotomized Eddie in a straitjacket chained at the neck to a padded cell.
  - "Flight of Icarus" shows a metal-winged Eddie torching Icarus with a Flamethrower, which Riggs states was meant to look like Led Zeppelin's Swan Song logo. The painting also contains a small box meant to be Eddie's Piece of Mind padded cell.
  - "The Trooper" depicts Eddie in a red coat uniform during the Charge of the Light Brigade.
- Powerslave features a statue of Eddie as an Egyptian pharaoh.
  - "2 Minutes to Midnight" shows Eddie sitting in front of an atomic explosion.
  - "Aces High" depicts Eddie in a Spitfire cockpit.
- Live After Death shows Eddie rising from the grave.
  - "Run to the Hills (live)" contains live versions of "Run to the Hills" and "Phantom of the Opera" and so featured Eddie as the phantom in a hilly landscape.
- Somewhere in Time depicts Eddie as a cyborg in a Blade Runner-inspired future. The cover is notable for containing dozens of Easter eggs relating to the band and pop culture references.
  - "Wasted Years" shows a partial reflection of Eddie in a time machine's monitor because the single came out before the album, and the band did not want to reveal Eddie's new cyborg guise.
  - "Stranger in a Strange Land" depicts a Clint Eastwood-like Eddie in a Star Wars-esque bar.
- Seventh Son of a Seventh Son depicts a surreal Eddie with most of his body removed, which Riggs claims was because he was "sick of painting him" and this would mean there would not be as much of him to draw. Riggs also comments that he set it in a "polar landscape" after seeing a documentary on the North Pole, and that Eddie's head on fire was inspired by Arthur Brown.
  - "Can I Play with Madness" shows a corkscrew that is attached to a forearm and hand piercing through Eddie's head.
  - "The Evil That Men Do" artwork was drawn in a single night, according to Riggs. In it, Eddie's face is formed from smoke, with a man held in a prison cell in his mouth, and a devil holding a contract rising from the top of his head.
  - "The Clairvoyant" depicts Eddie with three faces, indicating the ability to see the past, present and future.
  - "Infinite Dreams"/ Maiden England features Eddie riding a motorcycle.
- No Prayer for the Dying shows Eddie bursting out of another grave. The cover originally had Eddie strangling a gravedigger while bursting from the grave. The gravedigger was removed from the cover for the 1998 remastered release. Unlike the band's previous artwork in which he would retain the same features gained with each release (such as the Piece of Mind lobotomy), Eddie returned to how he appeared in the first few albums.
  - "Holy Smoke" depicts Eddie destroying a group of televisions broadcasting TV evangelists, whom the song itself attacks.
  - "Bring Your Daughter... to the Slaughter" featured several different covers, such as one in which Eddie is standing outside The Paradise Club (a British TV series which Bruce Dickinson featured in) with Jessica Rabbit, and one in which Eddie appears as the Grim Reaper in a graveyard.
- Fear of the Dark is the first cover not created by Derek Riggs and features Melvyn Grant's design of Eddie as a tree monster.
  - "Be Quick or Be Dead" shows Eddie attacking Robert Maxwell. According to Riggs, Eddie was drawn directly onto a photo of Maxwell.
- A Real Live One depicts Eddie biting through an electrical cord.
  - "Fear of the Dark (live)" has Eddie as Steve Harris. The artwork was also used for the Raising Hell video.
- A Real Dead One features Eddie as a radio DJ.
  - "Hallowed Be Thy Name (live)" depicts lead vocalist Bruce Dickinson being skewered with a trident by Eddie, who appears as the devil. This artwork was chosen because Dickinson was leaving the band.
- Live at Donington, a re-release, depicts Eddie with a pair of wings, originally created by Mark Wilkinson for the Monsters of Rock 1992 poster.
- The X Factor, created by Hugh Syme, shows Eddie on an operating table being vivisected by machine with most of his insides showing. Due to the cover's graphic nature, the band had to provide a less-violent alternative consisting of a similar Eddie from a distance. The cover itself sometimes referring to the band's bassist Steve Harris's situation, which at the time in the midst of divorce.
  - "Man on the Edge" is a close-up of the model's head.
  - "Lord of the Flies", also by Syme, has Eddie in an electric chair surrounded by two giant flies.
- Best of the Beast features a selection of Riggs' past Eddies.
  - "Virus" features two covers, one by Syme and one by Riggs featuring Eddie on a printed circuit board.
- Virtual XI, created by Melvin Grant, shows Eddie reaching toward a child wearing a virtual reality headset.
  - "The Angel and the Gambler" shows Eddie with wings standing outside a floating casino, created by Derek Riggs.
  - "Futureal", also by Riggs, depicts Eddie as a statue head with his brain exposed. Alternate covers for these two singles are renders of Eddie as he would appear in Ed Hunter.
- Ed Hunter features the version of Eddie used in the game.
- Brave New World originally showed Eddie in a cloud of smoke coming from a burning "Wicker Man" Eddie, artwork created by Derek Riggs, but this design was removed and placed into the album art, wherein his cloud form looms over a futuristic version of London.
  - "The Wicker Man" shows Eddie as a Wicker Man, created by Mark Wilkinson.
  - "Out of the Silent Planet" features Eddie at a press conference, also designed by Wilkinson. An alternate cover uses the same Eddie from the Brave New World cover.
- Rock in Rio, in both the CD and the DVD, shows Eddie as a cloud similar to the Brave New World cover, but looming over the Rock in Rio stage where the band played when the recording was made.
  - "Run to the Hills (2002 CD)", released to fund the nonprofit Clive Burr MS Trust Fund, had on its cover a Ross Halfin picture of Dickinson taken during the Rio concert digitally manipulated to turn him into Eddie.
- BBC Archives, created by Derek Riggs for Billboard, originally depicted Eddie destroying Capitol Records (with whom they had just signed) with the pole of a British flag, but the building was changed for the album cover to show him destroying the Broadcasting House instead.
- Beast over Hammersmith shows Eddie planting a British flag in the earth, adapted from The Beast on the Road tour program from 1982, drawn by Derek Riggs.
- Best of the 'B' Sides depicts Eddie mooning from behind the wheel of a truck with the words "Up the Irons" written across his rear end, illustrated by Mark Wilkinson. Wilkinson also designed the Eddie's Archive embossed metal case.
- Edward the Great shows Eddie on a throne in full royal regalia, created by Tom Adams.
- Dance of Death features Eddie as the Grim Reaper, created by David Patchett.
  - "Wildest Dreams" is a still shot of Eddie in a top hat from the "Wildest Dreams" music video.
  - "Rainmaker" cover are also was taken from its music video.
- Death on the Road features Eddie as an undertaker, designed by Melvyn Grant.
- A Matter of Life and Death shows Eddie riding a tank, created by Tim Bradstreet.
  - "The Reincarnation of Benjamin Breeg" depicts Eddie destroying the grave of Benjamin Breeg with a pickaxe, created by Melvyn Grant.
  - "Different World" cover art is a still from the song's music video.
- Somewhere Back in Time shows the cyborg Eddie (from Somewhere in Time) erupting from the Powerslave statue.
- The Final Frontier, drawn by Melvyn Grant, shows Eddie as an Extraterrestrial retrieving a key from a destroyed spaceship full of dead astronauts. The artwork caused confusion among the band's fanbase, who claimed it was not Eddie. Melvyn Grant himself has distanced this new monster from previous Eddie incarnations, stating that it "is not Eddie, as such," although the band members state that it is.
  - The "El Dorado" and "The Final Frontier" radio promo covers, featuring Grant's new Eddie in a comic book sleeve, were created by Anthony Dry.
- From Fear to Eternity, created by Melvyn Grant, shows three different incarnations: the Wicker Man Eddie from the "Wicker Man" single, the tank-riding Eddie from the A Matter of Life and Death album cover and a cross between the Dance of Death, Fear of the Dark and The Final Frontier Eddies.
- The Book of Souls was created by Mark Wilkinson. This Eddie draws inspiration from Maya civilisation, wearing facepaint and earspools similar to those of the Mesoamerican people.
- Senjutsu, also created by Mark Wilkinson, depicts Eddie as a samurai from feudal Japan based on an idea from Steve Harris. Senjutsu Eddie made his first appearance in the animated video for the first single from the album, "The Writing on the Wall," released four days prior to the announcement of Senjutsu on 15 July 2021.

== See also ==
- Derek Riggs
- Melvyn Grant
- Vic Rattlehead
