= The Final Frontier World Tour =

2010–2011 concert tour by Iron Maiden

- Tour by Iron Maiden
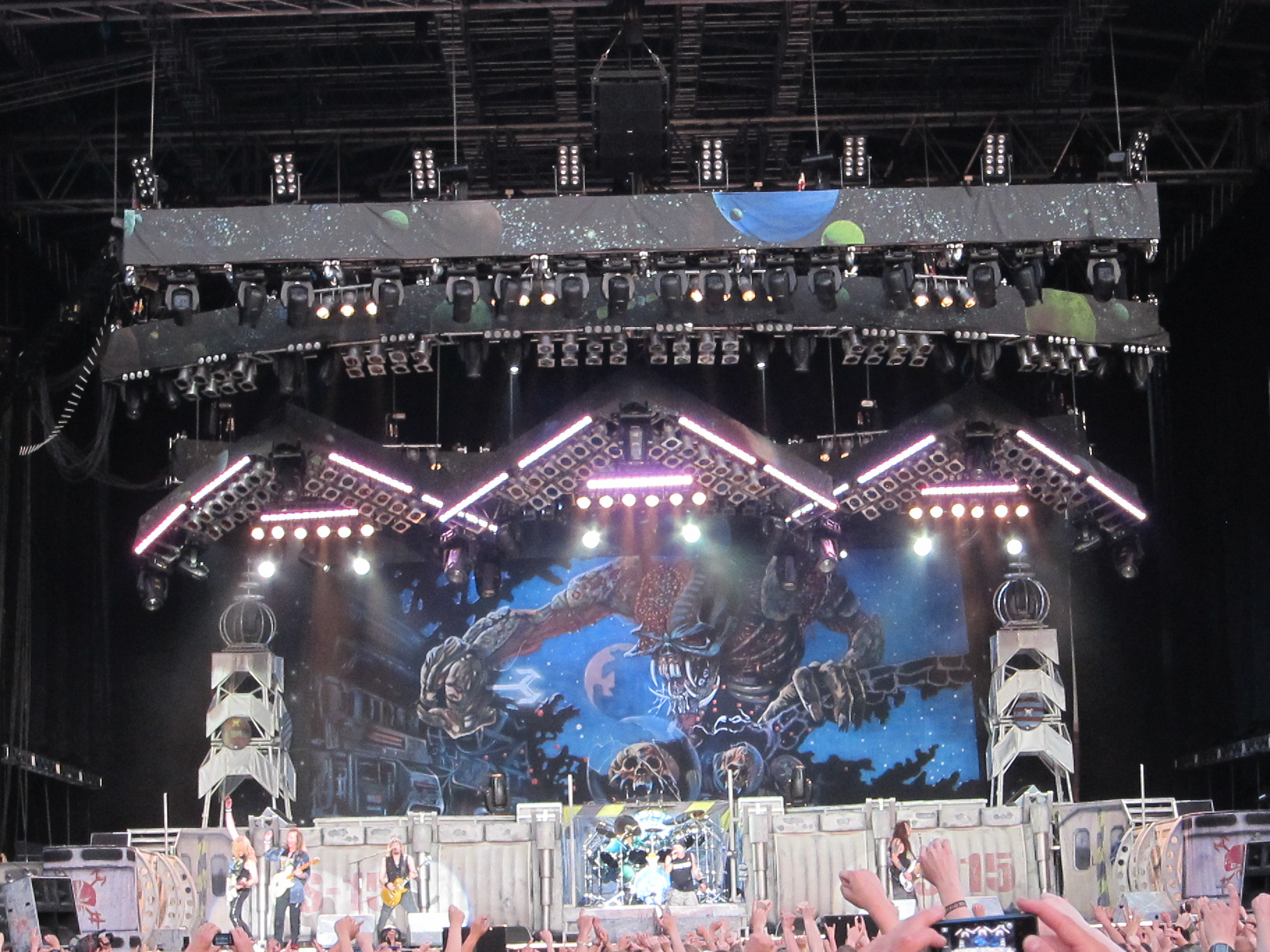
- Location: North America; Europe; Asia; Australia; South America
- Associated album: The Final Frontier
- Start date: 9 June 2010
- End date: 6 August 2011
- Legs: 4
- No. of shows: 101 (3 cancelled)

Iron Maiden concert chronology
- Somewhere Back in Time World Tour (2008–2009); The Final Frontier World Tour (2010–2011); Maiden England World Tour (2012–2014)

The Final Frontier World Tour was a concert tour by the English heavy metal band Iron Maiden in support of the band's 15th album, The Final Frontier, which began on 9 June 2010 in Dallas and ended in London, England on 6 August 2011. The tour was announced on the band's official website on 5 March 2010 under the following statement:

"Iron Maiden are pleased to announce that their forthcoming new studio album will be called 'The Final Frontier', and is expected be released late summer of this year.

The announcement comes with news of a North American Tour with Very Special Guests Dream Theater to open in Dallas, Texas, on 9th June and finish in Washington, D.C., on 20th July, making it Maiden's most extensive North American tour in many years.

Following these shows in USA and Canada The Final Frontier World Tour will travel back to Europe for a few selected major festival and stadium shows with the band planning to continue to many other countries in 2011."

The tour was extremely successful, with the band performing 98 shows in 36 countries across 5 continents to an estimated audience of well over 2 million people and led to 2012's live album/ video, En Vivo!.

== Background ==
The first leg of the tour was announced alongside the album title on 4 March, to include North American and European dates. The full track listing and artwork was unveiled on 8 June, along with a free download of the song El Dorado, confirmed as the only song from The Final Frontier to be played on the 2010 tour. In their list of the Top 50 North American Tours of 2012, Pollstar reported that, from 23 shows, the band grossed US$14.6 million from 274,289 ticket sales.

On 5 August 2010, Iron Maiden began releasing dates for the 2011 tour with a series of shows in Australia, incorporating several Soundwave festival appearances and two arena shows. This was followed by the announcement of a string of Scandinavian dates on 21 September, including shows in Oslo, Gothenburg, Helsinki, and the Roskilde Festival in Denmark. On 2 November, the band announced a total of 29 additional performances over 66 days, starting in Moscow on 11 February 2011, and continuing through Singapore, Indonesia, South Korea, Japan, Mexico, South America, Florida and encompassing the previously announced Australian dates. The band also confirmed that they would again be using the converted Boeing 757, dubbed "Ed Force One", as on the Somewhere Back in Time World Tour and that the setlist would be modified to include more material from the new album as well as older songs. It was during this leg of the tour that the band's 2012 live album and video, En Vivo!, was recorded, with concert footage shot in Buenos Aires and Santiago.

A ten date United Kingdom leg was announced on 11 November for July and August 2011, with an additional show in London confirmed to be the last of the tour. On 18 November, the band continued releasing European dates with eight additional shows in Continental Europe, encompassing Germany, The Netherlands and France (with an extra French date announced on 30 November). This was followed by the announcement of headline performances at Rock Werchter in Belgium on 30 November and Nova Rock Festival in Austria on 10 December.

The 2011 tour would also see Iron Maiden undertaking several headline performances at the Sonisphere Festivals, confirming Warsaw (on 14 December), Madrid (on 17 December), Basel (on 20 December), Imola (on 2 February), Czech Republic (on 8 February), Athens (on 24 February), Sofia (on 10 March) and Istanbul (on 2 April).

Overall, three dates were cancelled while one was postponed. Due to the 2011 Tōhoku earthquake and tsunami on 11 March, both Japanese shows were cancelled. The concert in Rio de Janeiro was postponed till the following night after the front crowd control barrier collapsed during the opening song. On 14 June, it was announced that Sonisphere Bulgaria, due to take place in Sofia, was officially cancelled. A statement published on the Iron Maiden official website claimed that this was due to "logistical problems".

In their list of the Top 25 Worldwide Tours of 2011, Pollstar reported that, from 46 concerts, Iron Maiden sold 718,313 tickets and grossed $53.5 million. The tour's overall attendance was estimated at over 2 million with 98 shows in 36 countries encompassing 5 continents.

== Live release ==
Band manager Rod Smallwood commented in a press release for the compilation album From Fear to Eternity that the shows in Argentina and Chile would be recorded for a live DVD, slated for release in late 2011. On 17 January, a 2-disc DVD, CD and Blu-ray entitled En Vivo!, filmed at the band's Santiago show at Estadio Nacional, was confirmed for a worldwide release on 26 March. The DVD and Blu-ray also featured an 88-minute documentary, Behind the Beast, and the music video for "Satellite 15...The Final Frontier" and its "Making Of" video.

== Reception ==
The tour received positive reviews in print media, heralded as "out of this world" by the News of the World, while The Independent deemed it "a blinding show, a brilliant fusion of high camp and proper heaviness." Metal Hammer awarded the band full marks, stating that it was "exactly the energetic show that has made Maiden the most loved metal band ever." Classic Rock were also positive, commenting that the band are "perennially preposterous but undeniably exciting, they appeal to the geeky fanboy inside all of us – regardless of age, sex or nationality."

The band members' respective prowess was the subject of much praise, with Metal Hammer saying that "everyone was in top form" and the Edmonton Journal commenting that "It's hard to believe that Maiden could have been any more energetic when they were at their peak in the early '80s; truly the metal gods have gifted these six with powers beyond that of mere mortals." Bruce Dickinson in particular was referred to regularly as "the envy of a man half his age".

Many publications noted the wide range of ages present during the tour, complimenting the band's ability to maintain a young audience.

The omission of commonly played songs such as "Run to the Hills" and "The Trooper" from the 2010 setlist led to some criticism, with the Calgary Herald suggesting that "...striking a more even balance between that new material and the unsinkable, ironclad battleships of yesteryear, would have made an incredibly satisfying show that much greater". Speaking in defence of the band's choice of setlist, Mike Portnoy (then of Dream Theater) said: "I can understand that fans want to hear the hits, but I can understand that Maiden don't want to be stuck playing the same songs for the rest of their lives. They put out new music so they want to play the new music." Interviewed for the Pittsburgh Post-Gazette on 14 July, Janick Gers responded to criticism of the setlist:

"It's really important if you're going to remain a valid band that you play your new stuff. Otherwise you become a parody of what you started out doing. But it's impossible [to play more from the new album]. Back in the early 80s you could probably do it, but now with YouTube and downloading, the songs would all be out before the album was out. We did Somewhere Back in Time and that dealt with the 80s, and the time before that we did A Matter of Life and Death, just the one album. You can't go out and play the greatest hits every time – it's important to play the newer songs because we really believe in them."

Even though the 2011 tour saw the band playing more of their 1980s tracks, the setlist still received criticism from reviewers, with The Guardian arguing that "lumbering new prog monsters, such as 'When the Wild Wind Blows', pale beside early headbangers 'Running Free' and 'Iron Maiden'." Kerrang! also criticised the set for being "slightly too focussed on their lengthy new material", claiming that this resulted in "alienating some people", although going on to state that they admire the band for "refusing to become the nostalgia act" and that it is "important that they still take these risks." Metal Hammer, on the other hand, praised the band for "not pandering to expectations, sticking to [their] guns and doing what [they] think is right – regardless of peer pressure", claiming that this is "the very spirit of heavy metal."

Reflecting on the tour in his 2017 memoir What Does This Button Do?, Dickinson recalled a 'robust' meeting with manager Rod Smallwood following the conclusion of the 2011 UK dates, airing concerns that the band were feeling particularly exhausted after a 35 date fourth leg. Although stating that he had no intention of retiring, he suggested that the band's members may not be able to maintain such an intense schedule in their advancing years, and that 'little and often' was a better strategy for future tours. The band have noticeably increased rest periods between tours and individual shows since this time.

== Set ==
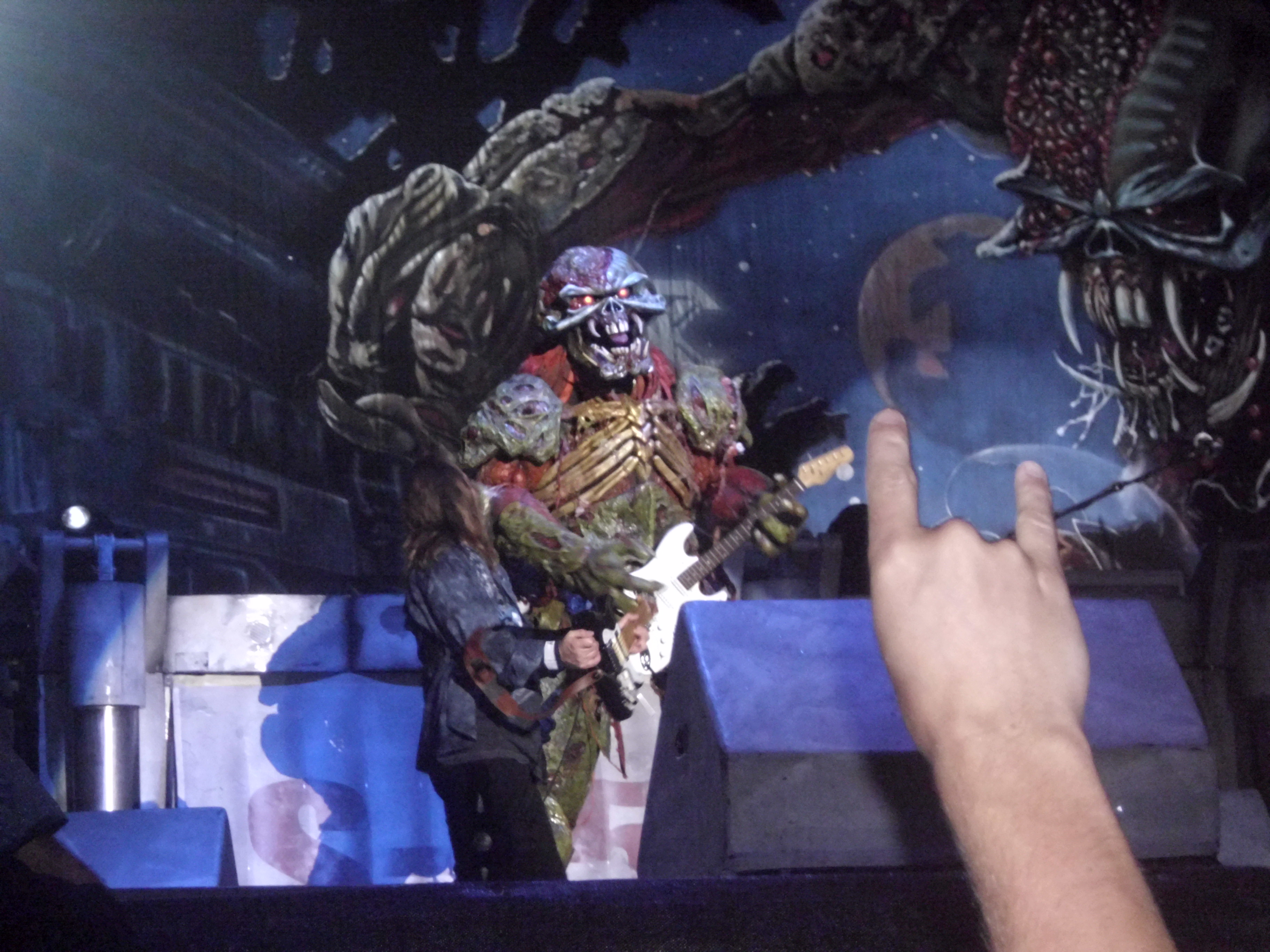

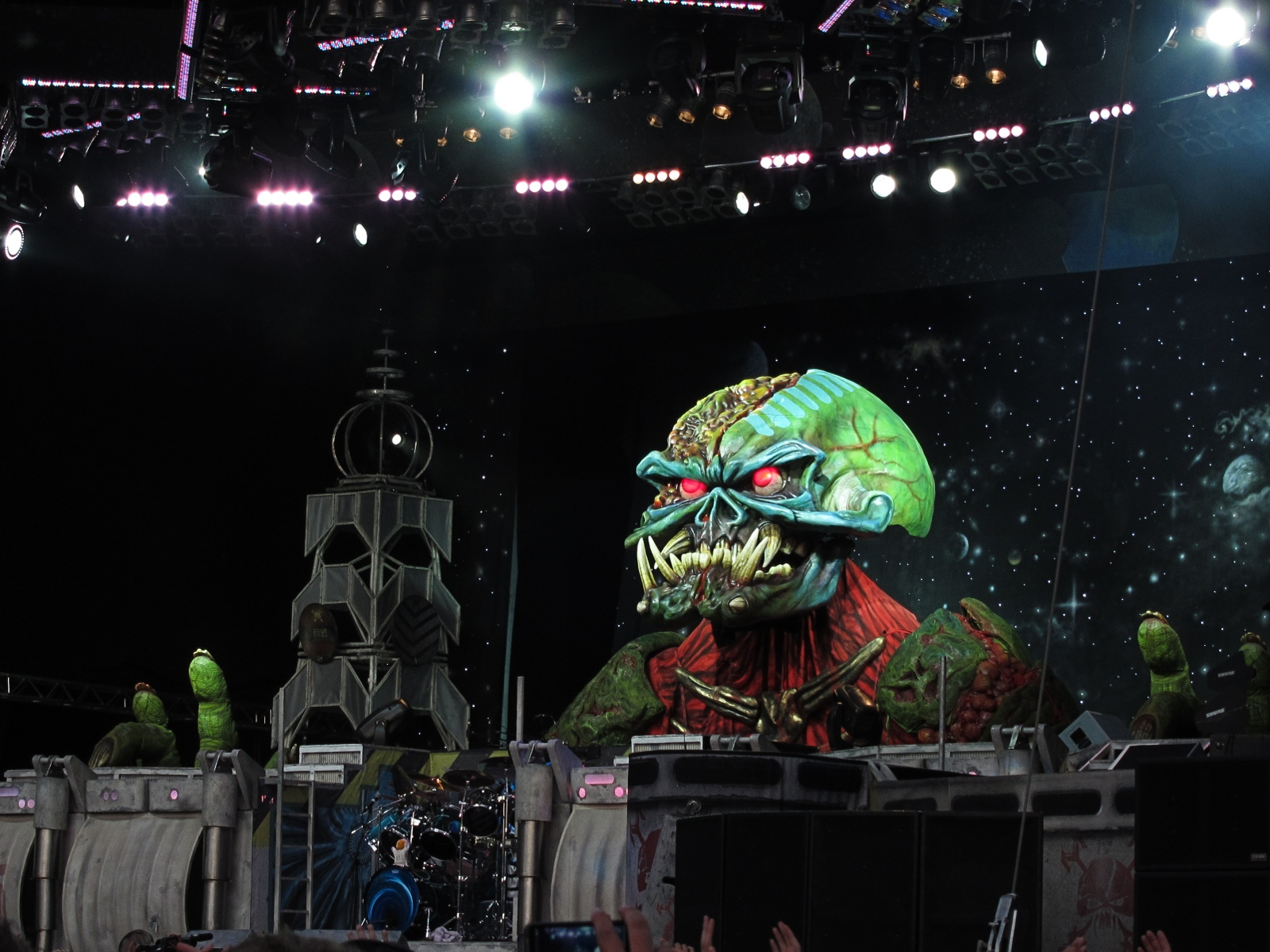
The two different representations of the band's mascot, Eddie, as seen in Bergen and Helsinki.

Regarding the stage production, Steve Harris remarked on 7 June 2010:

"We’re hugely excited about this tour. I think the fans will really like the brand new stage production and lights... Eddie has changed a bit for this tour but is possibly the most outrageous one to date... I can’t say too much about him as don’t want to spoil the surprise but I guarantee he will scare the hell out of you!"

Throughout the tour, the stage was decorated in a futuristic manner befitting The Final Frontier. Two large antennae adorned the back corners, both topped by lights. The long-used wraparound set, surrounding the band and providing a runway for Bruce Dickinson complete with two podiums, was decorated to look like a space ship with the monitors painted to match and featuring the new "Cross-keys" symbol. "S-15" appeared multiple times on the set, a reference to "Satellite 15... The Final Frontier", along with a succession of dots and lines at the back, spelling out "Eddie Lives" in morse code. The entrances to the stage were covered by two curtains painted as doors, and the stage floor was decorated to look like the rocky surface of a planet (changed to a metallic pattern in 2011). As with previous tours, Nicko McBrain's drumkit featured a Sooty puppet, this time dressed in a spacesuit.

The walk-on Eddie, a regular fixture of the band's tours, appeared in his new incarnation as an extraterrestrial. Complete with an "Ed-cam" (a point of view camera which fed directly to the projector screens), the new Eddie was smaller than those of previous tours, and was the first to appear with a guitar on stage. Eddie broke his guitar in Valencia, the last date of the 2010 tour, during the song "Iron Maiden", although it was replaced in 2011. In São Paulo, Rio de Janeiro, Buenos Aires, Santiago and throughout the second European leg a giant Eddie was used during "Iron Maiden", appearing at the back of the set with flashing eyes and hands gripping either side of the rear walkway (the walk-on Eddie, from that point, being used during "The Evil That Men Do").

The 2011 leg of the tour also saw Bruce Dickinson using a mic stand on stage for the first time since The Ed Hunter Tour of 1999.

== Opening acts ==
=== 2010 ===
- Dream Theater on all North American dates except Winnipeg.
- Automan in Winnipeg.
- Heaven & Hell were scheduled to support in both Bergen, Norway and Dublin, Ireland, but due to Ronnie James Dio's ongoing battle with cancer, all of the band's summer concerts were cancelled on 4 May. Dio later died on 16 May 2010.
- Dark Tranquillity were announced as the Bergen replacement.
- Sweet Savage were announced as the Dublin replacement.
- Cargo in Cluj-Napoca, Romania.
- Labyrinth in Codroipo, Italy.
- Edguy in Valencia.

=== 2011 ===
- Rise to Remain in Russia, Singapore, Indonesia, South Korea, the Australian stadia, Germany, The Netherlands, France and were due to support in Japan.
- Bullet for My Valentine were due to support in Japan.
- Maligno in Mexico.
- Potestad in Bogotá.
- Contracorriente in Lima.
- Cavalera Conspiracy in São Paulo.
- Shadowside in Rio de Janeiro- performed show on 27 March, but not the rescheduled show on 28 March.
- Khallice in Brasília.
- Stress in Belém.
- Terra Prima in Recife.
- Motorocker in Curitiba.
- Kamelot in Buenos Aires.
- Barilari in Buenos Aires.
- Exodus in Santiago.
- Slipknot in Greece, Turkey, Germany, Switzerland, and Italy.
- Black Tide in Florida.
- Sabaton in Gothenburg.
- Graveyard in Gothenburg.
- Alice Cooper in Finland and Norway.
- LowRiderZ in Saint Petersburg.
- Mindlock in Faro.
- Airbourne in the United Kingdom, excluding Belfast and London.
- DragonForce in Belfast and London (5 August).
- Trivium in London (6 August).

== Setlist ==
After the Somewhere Back in Time World Tour, which focused on songs from the band's 1980s albums, the setlist for the 2010 leg of the Final Frontier World Tour consisted primarily of songs recorded since the return of Bruce Dickinson and Adrian Smith in 1999.

2010 Setlist
- Gustav Holst's "Mars, the Bringer of War" served as the intro for the tour.
1. "The Wicker Man" (from Brave New World, 2000)
2. "Ghost of the Navigator" (from Brave New World, 2000)
3. "Wrathchild" (from Killers, 1981)
4. "El Dorado" (from The Final Frontier, 2010)
5. "Dance of Death" (from Dance of Death, 2003)
6. "The Reincarnation of Benjamin Breeg" (from A Matter of Life and Death, 2006)
7. "These Colours Don't Run" (from A Matter of Life and Death, 2006)
8. "Blood Brothers" (from Brave New World, 2000)
9. "Wildest Dreams" (from Dance of Death, 2003)
10. "No More Lies" (from Dance of Death, 2003)
11. "Brave New World" (from Brave New World, 2000)
12. "Fear of the Dark" (from Fear of the Dark, 1992)
13. "Iron Maiden" (from Iron Maiden, 1980)

Encore

1. "The Number of the Beast" (from The Number of the Beast, 1982)
2. "Hallowed Be Thy Name" (from The Number of the Beast, 1982)
3. "Running Free" (from Iron Maiden, 1980)

Notes:

- During each performance, Bruce Dickinson introduced "Blood Brothers" as a tribute to the late Ronnie James Dio.
- "Brighter Than a Thousand Suns" (from A Matter of Life and Death, 2006) was played instead of "Wrathchild" in Dallas.
- "Paschendale" (from Dance of Death, 2003) was played rather than "Dance of Death" in Dallas, San Antonio, Albuquerque, San Bernardino, and Auburn.

The band stated that the 2011 setlist would feature more of their earlier material, as well as additional songs from The Final Frontier. In an interview, Bruce Dickinson said the band would not play the entire album like they did with its predecessor on the first part of the A Matter of Life and Death Tour.

2011 Setlist
1. "Satellite 15... The Final Frontier" (from The Final Frontier, 2010)
2. "El Dorado" (from The Final Frontier, 2010)
3. "2 Minutes to Midnight" (from Powerslave, 1984)
4. "The Talisman" (from The Final Frontier, 2010)
5. "Coming Home" (from The Final Frontier, 2010)
6. "Dance of Death" (from Dance of Death, 2003)
7. "The Trooper" (from Piece of Mind, 1983)
8. "The Wicker Man" (from Brave New World, 2000)
9. "Blood Brothers" (from Brave New World, 2000)
10. "When The Wild Wind Blows" (from The Final Frontier, 2010)
11. "The Evil That Men Do" (from Seventh Son of a Seventh Son, 1988)
12. "Fear of the Dark" (from Fear of the Dark, 1992)
13. "Iron Maiden" (from Iron Maiden, 1980)

Encore

1. "The Number of the Beast" (from The Number of the Beast, 1982)
2. "Hallowed Be Thy Name" (from The Number of the Beast, 1982)
3. "Running Free" (from Iron Maiden, 1980)

Notes:

- "Satellite 15... The Final Frontier" was split into its components, the former played over the PA system as an intro along with additional sound effects and visuals, the latter performed as the opening song.
- Unlike on the album, "Satellite 15... The Final Frontier" and "El Dorado" were blended together, one leading directly into the other.
- "The Wicker Man" and "Blood Brothers" were played the other way round in Singapore, Jakarta and Bali, but accidentally were not on the opening date of the tour in Moscow.
- "The Talisman" was played after "The Evil That Men Do" in Moscow, and just before "The Evil That Men Do" in Singapore and Jakarta.
- During the Australian part of the tour, Bruce Dickinson introduced "Blood Brothers" as a tribute to the victims of the February 2011 Christchurch earthquake and their families. In South America, Puerto Rico, Florida and Europe, the song was also dedicated to those in Christchurch as well as the victims of the earthquake in Japan and the revolts in Egypt and Libya. Following the 2011 Norway attacks, the victims in Oslo were also added to the list of tributes.
- "The Trooper" was not played in Belfast.

== Tour dates ==
List of 2010 concerts
Date	City	Country	Venue
9 June 2010	Dallas	United States	SuperPages.com Center
11 June 2010	The Woodlands	United States	Cynthia Woods Mitchell Pavilion
12 June 2010	San Antonio	United States	AT&T Center
14 June 2010	Greenwood Village	United States	Comfort Dental Amphitheatre
16 June 2010	Albuquerque	United States	The Pavilion
17 June 2010	Phoenix	United States	Cricket Wireless Pavilion
19 June 2010	San Bernardino	United States	San Manuel Amphitheater
20 June 2010	Concord	United States	Sleep Train Pavilion
22 June 2010	Auburn	United States	White River Amphitheatre
24 June 2010	Vancouver	Canada	General Motors Place
26 June 2010	Edmonton	Canada	Rexall Place
27 June 2010	Calgary	Canada	Pengrowth Saddledome
29 June 2010	Saskatoon	Canada	Credit Union Centre
30 June 2010	Winnipeg	Canada	MTS Centre
3 July 2010	Toronto	Canada	Molson Amphitheatre
6 July 2010^{[A]}	Ottawa	Canada	LeBreton Flats Park
7 July 2010	Montreal	Canada	Bell Centre
9 July 2010^{[B]}	Quebec City	Canada	Plains of Abraham
11 July 2010	Holmdel	United States	PNC Bank Arts Center
12 July 2010	New York City	United States	Madison Square Garden
14 July 2010	Burgettstown	United States	First Niagara Pavilion
15 July 2010	Cuyahoga Falls	United States	Blossom Music Center
17 July 2010	Clarkston	United States	DTE Energy Music Theatre
18 July 2010	Tinley Park	United States	First Midwest Bank Amphitheatre
20 July 2010	Bristow	United States	Jiffy Lube Live
30 July 2010	Dublin	Ireland	The O_{2}
1 August 2010^{[C]}	Stevenage	England	Knebworth Park
5 August 2010^{[D]}	Wacken	Germany	True Metal Stage
7 August 2010^{[C]}	Stockholm	Sweden	Stora Skuggan
8 August 2010^{[C]}	Pori	Finland	Kirjurinluoto
11 August 2010	Bergen	Norway	Koengen
14 August 2010^{[E]}	Budapest	Hungary	Sziget Festival
15 August 2010	Cluj-Napoca	Romania	Polus Center
17 August 2010	Codroipo	Italy	Villa Manin
19 August 2010^{[F]}	Hasselt	Belgium	Kiewit
21 August 2010	Valencia	Spain	Auditorio Marina Sur

List of 2011 concerts
Date	City	Country	Venue
11 February 2011	Moscow	Russia	Olimpiyskiy Stadion
15 February 2011	Singapore		Singapore Indoor Stadium
17 February 2011	Jakarta	Indonesia	Carnival Beach Ancol
20 February 2011	Denpasar	Indonesia	Garuda Wisnu Kencana
23 February 2011	Melbourne	Australia	Hisense Arena
24 February 2011	Sydney	Australia	Sydney Entertainment Centre
26 February 2011^{[G]}	Brisbane	Australia	RNA Showgrounds
27 February 2011^{[G]}	Sydney	Australia	Sydney Showground
4 March 2011^{[G]}	Melbourne	Australia	Melbourne Showgrounds
5 March 2011^{[G]}	Adelaide	Australia	Bonython Park
7 March 2011^{[G]}	Perth	Australia	Claremont Showground
10 March 2011	Seoul	South Korea	Olympic Gymnastics Arena
12 March 2011	Saitama	Japan	Saitama Super Arena (Cancelled)
13 March 2011	Saitama	Japan	Saitama Super Arena (Cancelled)
17 March 2011	Monterrey	Mexico	Teatro Banamex
18 March 2011	Mexico City	Mexico	Foro Sol
20 March 2011	Bogotá	Colombia	Simón Bolívar Park
23 March 2011	Lima	Peru	Estadio Universidad San Marcos
26 March 2011	São Paulo	Brazil	Estádio do Morumbi
28 March 2011	Rio de Janeiro	Brazil	HSBC Arena (Postponed from the previous night)
30 March 2011	Brasília	Brazil	Estádio Mané Garrincha Parking Lot
1 April 2011	Belém	Brazil	Parque de Exposições
3 April 2011	Recife	Brazil	Centro de Convenções de Pernambuco External Area
5 April 2011	Curitiba	Brazil	Expotrade Arena Parking Lot
8 April 2011	Buenos Aires	Argentina	José Amalfitani Stadium
10 April 2011	Santiago	Chile	Estadio Nacional de Chile
14 April 2011	San Juan	Puerto Rico	Coliseo de Puerto Rico, José Miguel Agrelot
16 April 2011	Sunrise	United States	BankAtlantic Center
17 April 2011	Tampa	United States	St. Pete Times Forum
28 May 2011	Frankfurt	Germany	Festhalle Frankfurt
29 May 2011	Oberhausen	Germany	König Pilsener Arena
31 May 2011	Munich	Germany	Olympiahalle
2 June 2011	Hamburg	Germany	O_{2} World
3 June 2011	Berlin	Germany	O_{2} World
7 June 2011	Stuttgart	Germany	Hanns-Martin-Schleyer-Halle
8 June 2011	Arnhem	Netherlands	GelreDome
10 June 2011^{[C]}	Warsaw	Poland	Bemowo Airport
11 June 2011^{[C]}	Prague	Czech Republic	Výstaviště Praha
13 June 2011^{[H]}	Nickelsdorf	Austria	Pannonia Fields
17 June 2011^{[C]}	Athens	Greece	Terra Vibe Park
19 June 2011^{[C]}	Istanbul	Turkey	Küçükçiftlik Park
21 June 2011^{[C]}	Sofia	Bulgaria	National Hippodrome Bankya (Cancelled)
24 June 2011^{[C]}	Basel	Switzerland	St. Jakob-Gelände
25 June 2011^{[C]}	Imola	Italy	Autodromo Enzo e Dino Ferrari
27 June 2011	Paris	France	Palais Omnisports de Paris-Bercy
28 June 2011	Paris	France	Palais Omnisports de Paris-Bercy
30 June 2011^{[I]}	Roskilde	Denmark	Festivalpladsen
1 July 2011	Gothenburg	Sweden	Ullevi Stadium
3 July 2011^{[J]}	Werchter	Belgium	Festivalpark
6 July 2011	Oslo	Norway	Telenor Arena
8 July 2011	Helsinki	Finland	Helsinki Olympic Stadium
10 July 2011	Saint Petersburg	Russia	SKK Peterburgskiy
14 July 2011	Faro	Portugal	30th International Motorcycle Rally
16 July 2011^{[C]}	Madrid	Spain	Getafe Open Air
20 July 2011	Glasgow	Scotland	SECC
21 July 2011	Aberdeen	Scotland	AECC P&J Arena
23 July 2011	Newcastle	England	Metro Radio Arena
24 July 2011	Sheffield	England	Motorpoint Arena Sheffield
27 July 2011	Nottingham	England	Capital FM Arena
28 July 2011	Manchester	England	M.E.N. Arena
31 July 2011	Birmingham	England	National Indoor Arena
1 August 2011	Cardiff	Wales	Motorpoint Arena Cardiff
3 August 2011	Belfast	Northern Ireland	Odyssey Arena
5 August 2011	London	England	The O_{2} Arena
6 August 2011	London	England	The O_{2} Arena

Festivals and other miscellaneous performances
^{A} This concert was a part of "Ottawa Bluesfest"
^{B} This concert was a part of "Quebec City Summer Festival"
^{C} This concert was a part of "Sonisphere Festival"
^{D} This concert was a part of "Wacken Open Air"
^{E} This concert was a part of "Sziget Festival"
^{F} This concert was a part of "Pukkelpop"
^{G} This concert was a part of "Soundwave"
^{H} This concert was a part of "Nova Rock Festival"
^{I} This concert was a part of "Roskilde Festival"
^{J} This concert was a part of "Rock Werchter"

=== Box office score data ===
Venue	City	Tickets sold / available	Gross revenue (USD)
SuperPages.com Center	Dallas	10,737 / 20,003 (54%)	$502,064
Cynthia Woods Mitchell Pavilion	The Woodlands	11,316 / 15,917 (71%)	$603,660
AT&T Center	San Antonio	12,524 / 12,524 (100%)	$721,944
Comfort Dental Amphitheatre	Greenwood Village	10,670 / 16,887 (63%)	$518,851
The Pavilion	Albuquerque	10,949 / 15,183 (72%)	$375,242
Cricket Wireless Pavilion	Phoenix	10,395 / 20,258 (51%)	$386,380
San Manuel Amphitheater	San Bernardino	21,792 / 46,610 (47%)	$946,312
Sleep Train Pavilion	Concord	11,798 / 11,798 (100%)	$529,395
White River Amphitheatre	Auburn	12,215 / 19,532 (63%)	$491,130
General Motors Place	Vancouver	12,566 / 12,566 (100%)	$987,938
Pengrowth Saddledome	Calgary	8,743 / 12,644 (69%)	$681,118
MTS Centre	Winnipeg	8,175 / 10,194 (80%)	$582,615
Molson Amphitheatre	Toronto	15,618 / 15,618 (100%)	$859,029
Bell Centre	Montreal	14,115 / 14,891 (95%)	$938,812
PNC Bank Arts Center	Holmdel	14,885 / 16,951 (88%)	$589,711
Madison Square Garden	New York City	13,312 / 13,312 (100%)	$1,030,584
First Niagara Pavilion	Burgettstown	8,330 / 23,114 (36%)	$347,227
Blossom Music Center	Cuyahoga Falls	9,299 / 20,550 (45%)	$422,241
DTE Energy Music Theatre	Clarkston	11,705 / 14,891 (79%)	$404,650
First Midwest Bank Amphitheatre	Tinley Park	15,071 / 28,630 (53%)	$722,045
Jiffy Lube Live	Bristow	12,466 / 23,251 (54%)	$640,290
Olimpiyskiy Stadion	Moscow	16,439 / 24,291 (68%)	$2,051,993
Singapore Indoor Stadium	Singapore	9,785 / 11,401 (86%)	$1,111,850
Hisense Arena	Melbourne	7,367 / 7,968 (92%)	$893,074
Foro Sol	Mexico City	47,489 / 52,036 (91%)	$2,037,580
Simón Bolívar Park	Bogotá	6,744 / 10,000 (67%)	$780,894
Estadio Universidad San Marcos	Lima	11,733 / 20,000 (59%)	$678,843
Estádio do Morumbi	São Paulo	44,010 / 50,000 (88%)	$3,577,220
HSBC Arena	Rio de Janeiro	11,709 / 13,500 (87%)	$882,366
Estádio Mané Garrincha Parking Lot	Brasília	8,375 / 12,900 (65%)	$891,477
Centro de Convenções de Pernambuco External Area	Recife	7,001 / 9,400 (74%)	$587,630
Expotrade Arena Parking Lot	Curitiba	9,274 / 15,000 (62%)	$994,788
Estadio Vélez Sarsfield	Buenos Aires	33,621 / 37,000 (91%)	$1,692,850
Estadio Nacional de Chile	Santiago	43,780 / 55,000 (80%)	$2,600,170
Festhalle Frankfurt	Frankfurt	12,121 / 12,121 (100%)	$795,232
König Pilsener Arena	Oberhausen	10,298 / 10,298 (100%)	$675,961
Olympiahalle	Munich	11,968 / 11,968 (100%)	$787,831
O_{2} World	Hamburg	10,826 / 10,826 (100%)	$717,800
O_{2} World	Berlin	12,817 / 12,817 (100%)	$842,766
Hanns-Martin-Schleyer-Halle	Stuttgart	11,974 / 11,974 (100%)	$804,280
SECC	Glasgow	9,700 / 9,700 (100%)	$585,667
AECC P&J Arena	Aberdeen	8,412 / 8,412 (100%)	$508,783
Metro Radio Arena	Newcastle	10,500 / 10,500 (100%)	$641,962
Motorpoint Arena Sheffield	Sheffield	11,650 / 11,650 (100%)	$711,879
Capital FM Arena	Nottingham	8,510 / 8,510 (100%)	$521,990
M.E.N Arena	Manchester	15,150 / 15,150 (100%)	$931,077
National Indoor Arena	Birmingham	13,350 / 13,350 (100%)	$822,081
Motorpoint Arena Cardiff	Cardiff	6,960 / 6,960 (100%)	$428,585
The O_{2} Arena	London	31,350 / 31,350 (100%)	$2,127,420
TOTAL		699,594 / 889,415 (79%)	$45,792,955

== Personnel ==
(Credits taken from the official tour programme.)

Iron Maiden

- Bruce Dickinson – lead vocals
- Dave Murray – guitar
- Adrian Smith – guitar, backing vocals
- Janick Gers – guitar
- Steve Harris – bass guitar, backing vocals
- Nicko McBrain – drums, percussion

Management

- Rod Smallwood
- Andy Taylor

Booking Agents

- Rick Roskin at CAA (North America)
- John Jackson at K2 Agency Ltd. (Rest of the World)

Crew

- Dickie Bell – Production Consultant
- Ian Day – Tour Manager
- Steve Gadd – Tour Manager
- Patrick Ledwith – Production Manager
- Bill Conte – Stage Manager
- Zeb Minto – Production Coordinator
- Kerry Harris – Production Assistant
- Doug Hall – Front of House Sound Engineer
- Rob Coleman – Lighting Designer
- Steve 'Gonzo' Smith – Monitor Engineer
- Antti Saari – Lighting Chief
- Sean Brady – Adrian Smith's Guitar Technician
- Michael Kenney – Steve Harris' Guitar Technician and keyboards
- Charlie Charlesworth – Nicko McBrain's Drum Technician
- Justin Garrick – Janick Gers' Guitar Technician
- Colin Price – Dave Murray's Guitar Technician
- Ian 'Squid' Walsh – Sound Technician
- Mike Hackman – Sound System Technician
- Paul Stratford – Set Carpenter
- Ashley Groom – Set Carpenter
- Philip Stewart – Set Carpenter
- Griff Dickinson – Set Carpenter
- Jeffrey Weir – Head of Security
- Natasha De Sampayo – Wardrobe
- Andy Matthews – Video Director
- Nicholas Birtwistle – Video Technician
- Peter Lokrantz – Masseuse/Security
- Nick Jones – Merchandising
