= From Fear to Eternity (album) =

Compilation album by Iron Maiden
- Released: 6 June 2011
- Recorded: 1990–2010
- Genre: Heavy metal
- Length: 153:56
- Label: EMI
- Producers: Martin Birch, Kevin Shirley, Steve Harris

Iron Maiden chronology
The Final Frontier (2010)	From Fear to Eternity (2011)	En Vivo! (2012)

From Fear to Eternity: The Best of 1990–2010 is a compilation album by English heavy metal band Iron Maiden, containing a selection of songs originally released on the eight studio albums from No Prayer for the Dying to The Final Frontier. The title is lifted from the 1992 single, "From Here to Eternity", although it is not featured in this release.

== Background ==
The album was announced on 15 March 2011, to be released by EMI on 23 May, although this was later changed to 6 June. Unlike their previous compilation (Somewhere Back in Time), the release covered two CDs to encompass longer tracks, such as "Paschendale", although the price remained that of a single disc record.

As with Somewhere Back in Time, each track is sung by Bruce Dickinson rather than Blaze Bayley (who sang on The X Factor and Virtual XI), the band again opting to use later live versions of songs which originally featured other lead vocalists.

== Artwork ==
The album cover was designed by Melvyn Grant, and serves to reference each relevant studio release. Three representations of Eddie appear, one dressed in Grim Reaper attire (as in Dance of Death), one atop the tank from A Matter of Life and Death – which is imprinted with the "Cross-Keys" symbol from The Final Frontier – and a large burning wicker man (the first single from Brave New World). The artwork also contains the tree from Fear of the Dark, the tombstone from No Prayer for the Dying, a large "X" on the tree trunk (representing The X Factor) and the twisted figures and burnt building structure from the Virtual XI cover.

== Reception ==
Professional ratings
Review scores
Source	Rating
About.com	4/5 stars
AllMusic	4/5 stars
Classic Rock	8/10
Metal Hammer	8/10
PopMatters	7/10
Thrash Magazine	8.4/10

Classic Rock described the album as representing "Gold from every era", claiming that, although "weighted towards the... last five studio albums", the "earlier singles... fight their corner remarkably well." The review also argues that some of the release's later songs "match anything from Maiden's 80s heyday."

In their July 2011 issue, Metal Hammer praised the compilation for doing "an excellent job of gathering the heartiest wheat over the last two decades", although deeming Blaze Bayley's absence from the album a "glitch" albeit "for the best."

== Track listing ==
Disc One
No.	Title	Writer(s)	Original Album	Length
1.	"The Wicker Man"	Adrian Smith, Steve Harris, Bruce Dickinson	2000 ~ Brave New World	4:36
2.	"Holy Smoke"	Harris, Dickinson	1990 ~ No Prayer for the Dying	3:49
3.	"El Dorado"	Smith, Harris, Dickinson	2010 ~ The Final Frontier	6:49
4.	"Paschendale"	Smith, Harris	2003 ~ Dance of Death	8:27
5.	"Different World"	Smith, Harris	2006 ~ A Matter of Life and Death	4:18
6.	"Man on the Edge" (Live in Milan, Italy 1999)	Blaze Bayley, Janick Gers	2000 ~ "The Wicker Man" single (1995 ~ The X Factor)	4:33
7.	"The Reincarnation of Benjamin Breeg"	Dave Murray, Harris	2006 ~ A Matter of Life and Death	7:21
8.	"Blood Brothers"	Harris	2000 ~ Brave New World	7:14
9.	"Rainmaker"	Murray, Harris, Dickinson	2003 ~ Dance of Death	3:49
10.	"Sign of the Cross" (Live in Rock in Rio, Brazil 2001)	Harris	2002 ~ Rock in Rio (1995 ~ The X Factor)	10:51
11.	"Brave New World"	Murray, Harris, Dickinson	2000 ~ Brave New World	6:20
12.	"Fear of the Dark" (Live in Rock in Rio, Brazil 2001)	Harris	2002 ~ Rock in Rio (1992 ~ Fear of the Dark)	7:51

Disc Two
No.	Title	Writer(s)	Original Album	Length
1.	"Be Quick or Be Dead"	Dickinson, Gers	1992 ~ Fear of the Dark	3:24
2.	"Tailgunner"	Harris, Dickinson	1990 ~ No Prayer for the Dying	4:15
3.	"No More Lies"	Harris	2003 ~ Dance of Death	7:22
4.	"Coming Home"	Smith, Harris, Dickinson	2010 ~ The Final Frontier	5:53
5.	"The Clansman" (Live in Rock in Rio, Brazil 2001)	Harris	2002 ~ Rock in Rio (1998 ~ Virtual XI)	9:28
6.	"For the Greater Good of God"	Harris	2006 ~ A Matter of Life and Death	9:24
7.	"These Colours Don't Run"	Smith, Harris, Dickinson	2006 ~ A Matter of Life and Death	6:53
8.	"Bring Your Daughter... to the Slaughter"	Dickinson	1990 ~ No Prayer for the Dying	4:44
9.	"Afraid to Shoot Strangers"	Harris	1992 ~ Fear of the Dark	6:56
10.	"Dance of Death"	Gers, Harris	2003 ~ Dance of Death	8:37
11.	"When the Wild Wind Blows"	Harris	2010 ~ The Final Frontier	11:02
Total length:				153:56

== Personnel ==
Production and performance credits are adapted from the album liner notes.

Iron Maiden

- Bruce Dickinson – vocals
- Dave Murray – guitars
- Janick Gers – guitars
- Adrian Smith – guitars (except on "Holy Smoke", "Tailgunner", "Be Quick or Be Dead", "Afraid to Shoot Strangers", and "Bring Your Daughter... to the Slaughter")
- Steve Harris – bass, keyboards
- Nicko McBrain – drums

Additional musicians

- Michael Kenney – keyboards on "Sign of the Cross", "Afraid to Shoot Strangers", "Fear of the Dark" and "The Clansman" (uncredited)

Production

- Ade Emsley – mastering
- Stuart Crouch – art direction, design
- Melanie Hunter – art direction, design
- Anthony Dry – art direction, design
- Melvyn Grant – cover illustration
- John McMurtrie – photography
- Rod Smallwood – management
- Andy Taylor – management

== Charts ==
Chart (2011)	Peak position
Austrian Albums (Ö3 Austria)	22
Belgian Albums (Ultratop Flanders)	26
Belgian Albums (Ultratop Wallonia)	49
Canadian Albums (Billboard)	17
Dutch Albums (Album Top 100)	45
Finnish Albums (Suomen virallinen lista)	11
French Albums (SNEP)	46
German Albums (Offizielle Top 100)	19
Greek Albums (IFPI)	10
Hungarian Albums (MAHASZ)	30
Italian Albums (FIMI)	23
Japanese Albums (Oricon)	100
Mexican Albums (Top 100 Mexico)	54
New Zealand Albums (RMNZ)	16
Norwegian Albums (VG-lista)	10
Portuguese Albums (AFP)	8
Scotland (Official Charts Company)	14
Spanish Albums (Promusicae)	23
Swedish Albums (Sverigetopplistan)	6
Swiss Albums (Schweizer Hitparade)	20
UK Albums (Official Charts)	19
US Billboard 200	86

== Certifications ==
Region	Certification	Certified units/sales
Germany (BVMI)	Gold	100,000^{‡}
United Kingdom (BPI)	Gold	100,000^{‡}
^{‡} Sales+streaming figures based on certification alone.
