= Gudmundur Thorvaldsson =

Icelandic actor

Gudmundur Ingi Thorvaldsson (Icelandic: Guðmundur Ingi Þorvaldsson) is an Icelandic actor.

== Education ==
Thorvaldsson graduated from the Icelandic Acting School in 1998, received a Master of Arts degree in performance making from Goldsmiths University in 2009, and a master in business arts degree from the University of Reykjavik in 2014.

== Career ==
Thorvaldsson is the voice of the Icelandic National Broadcasting Service. He voiced the character Sigurd Styrbjornsson in the video game series Assassin's Creed.

He portrayed an astronaut in the music video for the song Satellite 15... The Final Frontier by Iron Maiden.

In 2001, he played the role of Ellert in the film 101 Reykjavík. In 2005 he played Markmadur in the film Eleven Men Out. He played Marcellus in the 2024 biblical epic film Mary.
