= The Final Frontier =

Studio album by Iron Maiden
- Released: 13 August 2010
- Recorded: 11 January – 1 March 2010
- Studios: Compass Point (Nassau, Bahamas); The Cave (Malibu)
- Genres: Heavy metal; progressive metal
- Length: 76:34
- Label: EMI
- Producer: Kevin Shirley

Iron Maiden chronology
Flight 666 - The Original Soundtrack (2009)	The Final Frontier (2010)	From Fear to Eternity (2011)

Singles from The Final Frontier
- 1. "El Dorado" Released: 8 June 2010

The Final Frontier is the fifteenth studio album by English heavy metal band Iron Maiden. It was released on 13 August 2010 in Germany, Sweden, Austria and Finland, 17 August in North America, 18 August in Japan, and 16 August worldwide. At 76 minutes and 34 seconds, it is the band's third-longest studio album to date, a duration surpassed only by 2015's The Book of Souls and 2021's Senjutsu, and their longest album that still fit as a single album. Melvyn Grant, a long-time contributor to the band's artwork, created the cover art. It is the band's final album to be released through EMI Records, marking the end of their 30-year relationship. It is also the last album that uses a modified version of the band's logo. While not a concept album, themes of exploration, expectation, and discovery are frequent throughout. The Final Frontier is the band's first studio album in nearly four years, making it one of the longest gaps between albums.

The album received favourable reviews from critics and peaked at No. 1 in 28 countries. This included the United Kingdom, where it became the band's fourth release to top the UK Albums Chart following 1982's The Number of the Beast, 1988's Seventh Son of a Seventh Son and 1992's Fear of the Dark. On top of this, The Final Frontier also charted at No. 4 in the United States, marking their highest placement on the Billboard 200 until it was surpassed by 2021's Senjutsu at No. 3, in addition to gaining the band their first Grammy Award in the Best Metal Performance category for the song "El Dorado", released as a free download on 8 June 2010.

EMI released the album in most of the world, while in the United States it was released jointly by Universal Music Enterprises and Sony Music Entertainment – the successor to the Sanctuary Records/Columbia Records joint venture that had previously controlled the Iron Maiden catalogue in North America.

== Overview ==
On 22 April 2009, during a Rock Radio interview promoting Iron Maiden: Flight 666, drummer Nicko McBrain mentioned that Iron Maiden had booked studio time for early 2010. On 8 June, the album artwork, release date, and track listing were revealed, along with a free download of the track "El Dorado." The album was released as a regular CD, an iTunes LP, a digital download, a vinyl picture disc, and a limited collector's "Mission Edition", containing interviews and a game entitled Mission II: Rescue & Revenge.

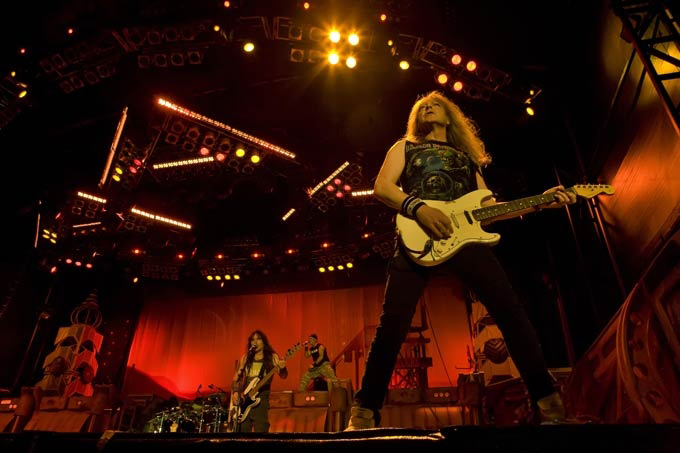
Iron Maiden performing "El Dorado" during The Final Frontier World Tour. The song was released as a free digital download in June 2010.

The North American leg of their tour in support of the album started in Dallas, Texas on 9 June 2010, with a European tour beginning in Dublin on 30 July. As these dates preceded the record's release, "El Dorado" was the only new song played in 2010. The full album tour commenced in Moscow on 11 February 2011, and would see the band visit South East Asia, Australia, South America and Florida, as well as returning to Europe. The tour led to the release of a live album and video, entitled En Vivo!, which was released in March 2012.

Prior to its release, bassist and band founder Steve Harris was quoted as saying that he imagined the band would release a total of fifteen studio albums. The title, which also shares its name with its supporting tour and opening track, fuelled further rumours that The Final Frontier would be Iron Maiden's last, however the band members admitted they hoped to make further releases and continue touring in the future. Harris in particular has stated that "if there's time and we all wanna do it, then why not? It would be sad if we don't make another album, and sad for the fans too", while vocalist Bruce Dickinson admits that the title was largely mischief. In June 2010, Dickinson stated that he thought up the album's title 15 months previously: "I just thought 'We should call the next album The Final Frontier!' because it sort of is ... It could be, but it might not be! It means we can go back to space for an Eddie and things like that, and we haven't done that for a while. It has a certain romance to it."

== Production ==
On 2 November 2009, Janick Gers confirmed to BBC News that the band already had new material written and would head to Paris, France, to start composing and rehearsing the bulk of the new album. According to Dickinson, "we had probably the least amount of preparation we've ever had, which is bizarre because it's the longest and most complicated record of all of them." After taking time off for Christmas, recording commenced in January at Compass Point Studios, Nassau, Bahamas, with Kevin Shirley producing. This was the first time the band returned to the Bahamas since they last recorded at Compass Point in the 1980s, to which Dickinson remarked:

The studio had the same vibe and it was exactly as it had been in 1983, nothing had changed! Even down to the broken shutter in the corner ... same carpet ... everything ... It was really quite spooky. But we felt very relaxed in such a familiar and well-trodden environment and I think this shows in the playing and the atmosphere of the album.

After a month in Nassau, the production was moved to Malibu, California, where the songs were mixed and additional vocals were recorded. On 6 April, Shirley told Blabbermouth.net that he had completed mixing the album, and commented on the final stages of its production on 6 May; "Bruce Dickinson flew in for a few days and sang all his parts before flying off to the four corners of the globe and Steve Harris stayed behind to finish the record with me. He's pretty hands-on like that. Adrian Smith [guitars] dropped in from time to time to hear stuff, and like in any band, not everyone has the same end result in mind, but we get there."

== Songs ==
The album is the fourth for which Steve Harris receives writing credits for every track, following Killers (1981), Brave New World (2000), and A Matter of Life and Death (2006); however, the final track, "When the Wild Wind Blows", is the only song which he wrote on his own. Adrian Smith explains that, in recent years, Harris has become "more into writing lyrics and melodies and arranging" other members' tracks and only "brings in one or two songs" of his own.

"El Dorado" was released as a free digital download on the band's official website on 8 June and went on to win in the Best Metal Performance category at the 2011 Grammy Awards. According to Smith, the song's lyrics, penned by Dickinson, are based on the 2008 financial crisis and comment on "people's expectations of a better life" and how "the rug [was] pulled out from under them" as a result of lending.

The album's first and only music video, containing the latter half of "Satellite 15... The Final Frontier", was filmed in Rendlesham Forest, south-east England, and released on 13 July. Although the album has no official singles, both "El Dorado" and the second part of "Satellite 15... The Final Frontier" (along with its music video) were issued as radio promos before the album's release. "Coming Home" was also released as a radio single on 27 October, featuring an alternative "radio edit" version of the song.

In a 1 July 2010 interview with Billboard, guitarist Dave Murray commented that the album mixes "straight-ahead, uptempo rock songs with good grooves with some other tracks that are kind of longer and more complex", referring particularly to "When the Wild Wind Blows", the band's seventh longest song after "Empire of the Clouds", "Rime of the Ancient Mariner", "The Red and the Black", "The Parchment", "Hell on Earth" and "Sign of the Cross": Interviewed for the Pittsburgh Post-Gazette on 14 July, guitarist Janick Gers discussed the album's overall sound: "We're taking it to extremes... the one song we released ["El Dorado"] isn't indicative of the rest of the album—there's so many different feels and ways of playing on the album. We go through some different attitudes and take you to different places. There's a lot of long thematic tunes on this album. And some very varied music." Speaking to Classic Rock in June 2010, Bruce Dickinson stated that "This one is probably the greatest departure from our sound. It's been happening incrementally since Brave New World. That's great, after doing it all for this long, to still be figuring stuff out. We could just be bored by it all, but we're obviously not."

Although "El Dorado" would be the only new song featured in the 2010 leg of The Final Frontier World Tour, "Satellite 15... The Final Frontier," "The Talisman," "Coming Home" and "When The Wild Wind Blows" were added to the setlist in 2011. "El Dorado", "Coming Home" and "When the Wild Wind Blows" were later featured on the "Best Of" album From Fear to Eternity.

== Critical reception ==
Professional ratings
Aggregate scores
Source	Rating
Metacritic	71/100
Review scores
Source	Rating
About.com	4.5/5 stars
AllMusic	3.5/5 stars
Blabbermouth.net	9.0/10
BW&BK	9.5/10
Classic Rock	9/10
The Guardian	3/5 stars
Kerrang!	4/5
Metal Hammer	8/10
Rolling Stone	3/5 stars
Rock Sound	8/10

At Metacritic, the album has a score of 71 out of 100 based on 15 critics, indicating "generally favorable reviews". Classic Rock praised it as "densely layered and substantial", as well as "beautifully paced and disarmingly complex" and "a fresh take on a sound that has admirably withstood three decades of fashions and fads". Kerrang! called it "a record that'll still bowl you over in a decade's time" and MusicRadar stated that "Iron Maiden have created a work full of hypnotic excitement, unconventional structure and dizzying vision...the group have succeeded beyond their wildest dreams." Brave Words & Bloody Knuckles called it "a thrilling and deeply satisfying glimpse into a brave new future for the people's metal band," while the BBC praised the album as "a remarkable achievement", complimenting the band for "no compromises, just complexities and challenges and more moments of brilliance than perhaps even they thought they still had left in them".

Many reviewers, such as Metal Hammer, deemed it "a demanding album, but one that most Maiden fans are going to absolutely adore". The Quietus commented, "The Final Frontier takes time, it takes effort, but it's overwhelmingly brilliant. They haven't just served up the easy option – that would have been boring for us and, more importantly you feel, boring for them." PopMatters considered the record "in some ways ... the most ambitious album Iron Maiden has ever made, a 76-minute opus."

Many critics commented on where The Final Frontier rates in comparison to the band's past releases, with Consequence of Sound deeming the album "easily the best from the six-piece since 2000's Brave New World." AllMusic agreed with this, stating, "The Final Frontier still brings Iron Maiden closer to their aesthetic legacy and triumphant year 2000 rebirth than its two predecessors." Blabbermouth.net, on the other hand, praised it as "better than Brave New World", explaining that "this is the reason Bruce Dickinson and Adrian Smith rejoined the band, the fulfillment of a decade of promise, and arguably the first time that Steve Harris's post-Fear of the Dark cinematic vision has been backed up with consistently strong songwriting, spot-on production, and a fire-in-the-belly performance from the whole band".

The Guardian were more critical of the release, commenting that "with four songs alone clocking in at 40 minutes, The Final Frontier becomes less an exercise in experimentation than old-fashioned endurance, and the hushed-intro-bombastic-chorus dynamic begins to grate a little". Drowned in Sound agreed, commenting that "standards sink fast after ["The Alchemist"], and don't rise again for another half an hour", although going on to add that "the epic 11-minute closer, 'When the Wild Wind Blows' ... shows the subtlety and craftsmanship of the four songs that preceded it, but adds an emotional depth that they seemed to lack".

== Commercial performance ==
Throughout The Final Frontier World Tour, Bruce Dickinson often requested that fans put the album to No. 1 in the respective country's music charts, which it did in 28 countries worldwide. It is the first Iron Maiden release to debut at No. 1 in the United Kingdom charts since 1992's Fear of the Dark, having sold 44,385 copies in its first week. In addition, The Final Frontier debuted at No. 4 in the Billboard 200 with 63,000 units sold, the highest position the band had ever reached in the United States.

By the end of its first week, over 800,000 copies had been shipped to retailers worldwide.

== Accolades ==
The album was ranked No. 1, No. 3, and No. 7 respectively in Metal Hammer, Kerrang! and Revolver's lists of the best albums of 2010.

The song "El Dorado" won the band a Grammy award for "Best Metal Performance".

== Track listing ==
The Final Frontier track listing
No.	Title	Writer(s)	Length
1.	"Satellite 15... The Final Frontier"	Adrian Smith; Steve Harris	8:40
2.	"El Dorado"	Smith; Harris; Bruce Dickinson	6:49
3.	"Mother of Mercy"	Smith; Harris	5:20
4.	"Coming Home"	Smith; Harris; Dickinson	5:52
5.	"The Alchemist"	Janick Gers; Harris; Dickinson	4:29
6.	"Isle of Avalon"	Smith; Harris	9:06
7.	"Starblind"	Smith; Harris; Dickinson	7:48
8.	"The Talisman"	Gers; Harris	9:03
9.	"The Man Who Would Be King"	Dave Murray; Harris	8:28
10.	"When the Wild Wind Blows"	Harris	11:00
Total length:			76:35

=== Mission Edition bonus content ===
- "The Final Frontier" director's cut music video
- Band interviews conducted by Sam Dunn and Scot McFadyen
- Mission II: Rescue & Revenge game
- Wallpapers and photos

== Personnel ==
Production and performance credits are adapted from the album liner notes.

=== Iron Maiden ===
- Bruce Dickinson – vocals
- Dave Murray – guitars
- Adrian Smith – guitars
- Janick Gers – guitars
- Steve Harris – bass guitar, keyboards, co-producer
- Nicko McBrain – drums

=== Technical personnel ===
- Kevin "Caveman" Shirley – producer, mixing
- Jared Kvitka – engineer
- Terry Manning – studio technician (Compass Point Studios)
- Brent Spear – studio technician (The Cave)
- James McCullagh – assistant (The Cave)
- Philip Scholes – SSL Duality technician
- Bob Ludwig – mastering
- Stuart Crouch – art director, design
- Andrew Yap – art direction, design
- Anthony Dry – art direction, design
- Rob Wallis – art direction, design
- Melvyn Grant – cover illustration, working drawings, sketches
- John McMurtrie – photography

== Charts ==
=== Weekly charts ===
Weekly chart performance for The Final Frontier
Chart (2010)	Peak position
Australian Albums (ARIA)	2
Austrian Albums (Ö3 Austria)	1
Belgian Albums (Ultratop Flanders)	2
Belgian Albums (Ultratop Wallonia)	2
Brazilian Albums (ABPD)	1
Canadian Albums (Billboard)	1
Colombian Albums (National-Report)	1
Croatian International Albums (HDU)	1
Czech Albums (ČNS IFPI)	1
Danish Albums (Hitlisten)	1
Dutch Albums (Album Top 100)	2
Finnish Albums (Suomen virallinen lista)	1
French Albums (SNEP)	1
German Albums (Offizielle Top 100)	1
Greek Albums (IFPI)	1
Hungarian Albums (MAHASZ)	1
Irish Albums (IRMA)	3
Italian Albums (FIMI)	1
Japanese Albums (Oricon)	5
Mexican Albums (Top 100 Mexico)	1
New Zealand Albums (RMNZ)	2
Norwegian Albums (VG-lista)	1
Polish Albums (ZPAV)	3
Portuguese Albums (AFP)	1
Russian Albums (2M)	1
Scottish Albums (Official Charts)	1
Spanish Albums (Promusicae)	1
Swedish Albums (Sverigetopplistan)	1
Swiss Albums (Schweizer Hitparade)	1
UK Albums (Official Charts)	1
UK Rock & Metal Albums (Official Charts)	1
US Billboard 200	4
US Top Rock Albums (Billboard)	2

=== Year-end charts ===
Year-end chart performance for The Final Frontier
Chart (2010)	Position
Austrian Albums (Ö3 Austria)	63
Belgian Albums (Ultratop Flanders)	100
French Albums (SNEP)	115
German Albums (Offizielle Top 100)	58
Russian Albums (2M)	50
Swedish Albums (Sverigetopplistan)	17
Swiss Albums (Schweizer Hitparade)	49
UK Albums (OCC)	147

== Certifications ==
Region	Certification	Certified units/sales
Canada (Music Canada)	Gold	40,000^{^}
Colombia	Gold	
Finland (Musiikkituottajat)	Platinum	22,510
France (SNEP)	Gold	50,000^{*}
Germany (BVMI)	Gold	100,000^{^}
Italy (FIMI)	Gold	30,000^{*}
Norway (IFPI Norway)	Gold	15,000^{*}
Poland (ZPAV)	Gold	10,000^{*}
Russia (NFPF)	Gold	5,000^{*}
Sweden (GLF)	Gold	20,000^{‡}
Switzerland (IFPI Switzerland)	Gold	15,000^{^}
United Kingdom (BPI)	Gold	100,000^{*}
^{*} Sales figures based on certification alone.^{^} Shipments figures based on certification alone.^{‡} Sales+streaming figures based on certification alone.
