= No Prayer for the Dying =

Studio album by Iron Maiden
- Released: 1 October 1990
- Recorded: June–September 1990
- Studios: Barnyard (Essex, England)
- Genre: Heavy metal
- Length: 43:42
- Label: EMI
- Producer: Martin Birch

Iron Maiden chronology
The First Ten Years (1990)	No Prayer for the Dying (1990)	Fear of the Dark (1992)

Alternative cover
- 1998 remastered edition

Singles from No Prayer for the Dying
- 1. "Holy Smoke" Released: 10 September 1990; 2. "Bring Your Daughter... to the Slaughter" Released: 24 December 1990

No Prayer for the Dying is the eighth studio album by English heavy metal band Iron Maiden. It is their first album to feature Janick Gers on guitar, who replaced Adrian Smith. Smith left the band during the pre-production phase, unhappy with the musical direction it was taking; he contributed to just one song, "Hooks in You". This was the third song in the "Charlotte the Harlot" saga. Gers previously worked with singer Bruce Dickinson on his first solo album, Tattooed Millionaire, and had also worked with Ian Gillan, former Marillion singer Fish, and new wave of British heavy metal band, White Spirit.

Although it received generally mixed to negative reviews, the album peaked at No. 2 in the UK Albums Chart and contains the band's only UK Singles Chart No. 1, "Bring Your Daughter... to the Slaughter".

== Background ==
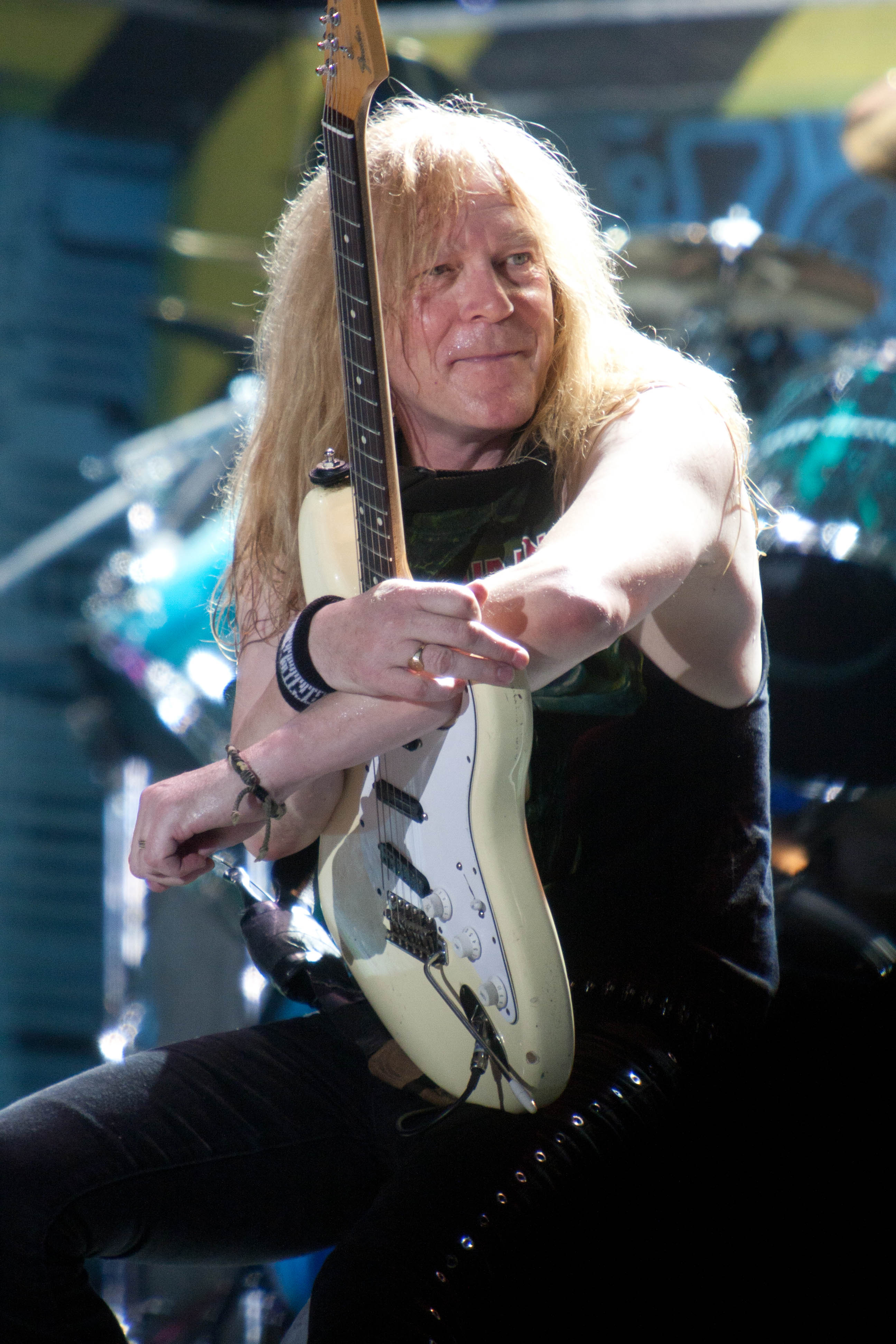
Guitarist Janick Gers replaced Adrian Smith during the album's preproduction stages.

The album departed from the keyboard- and synthesiser-saturated progressive rock direction of the band's two previous studio outings (1986's Somewhere in Time and 1988's Seventh Son of a Seventh Son) in favour of a more "stripped down," straightforward style, reminiscent of the band's earlier material, which ushered in a change of vocal style for Bruce Dickinson from the operatic sound of the 1980s to a raspier way of singing. In addition, Michael Kenney, who had played keyboards on tour for the band, played keyboards on the album, replacing Harris and Adrian Smith from previous albums. The idea to make a more "street level" release also inspired the band to record in a barn on bassist Steve Harris's property in Essex, using the Rolling Stones Mobile Studio. This means it is the first Iron Maiden album to be recorded in their home country since 1982's The Number of the Beast. Dickinson states that this idea was a mistake, commenting that "It was shit! It was a shit-sounding record, and I wished we hadn't done it that way. At the time, I was as guilty as anyone else in going, 'Oh great! Look, we're all covered in straw! What a larf!'"

The album also departed from literary lyrical themes in favour of more political content, with songs focusing on religious exploitation (such as in the record's first single, "Holy Smoke") and social concerns ("Public Enema Number One"). No Prayer for the Dying is the only Iron Maiden studio album to date without a song exceeding six minutes in length and the second one to contain profanity in the lyrics, the debut album being the first to do so. It was also the band's first release with Epic Records in the US, after the band left Capitol Records, but was sold through EMI for all territories outside the US. Despite charting well in most countries, particularly in the UK where it debuted at No. 2, it would be the band's last album to receive gold certification in the US.

No Prayer for the Dying includes the hit song "Bring Your Daughter... to the Slaughter", which, in spite of a ban by the BBC, remains Iron Maiden's only UK No. 1 single to date. A tongue-in-cheek song written by Dickinson and originally recorded with his solo band for the A Nightmare on Elm Street 5: The Dream Child film soundtrack, Harris decided that the song would be "great for Maiden" and had the band re-record it.

Following Dickinson's departure from Iron Maiden in 1993, songs from No Prayer for the Dying have been largely ignored at live performances. "Bring Your Daughter... to the Slaughter" was the only song played on a post-1993 setlist, appearing on the band's 2003 summer tour.

== Album cover ==
No Prayer for the Dying does not follow the continuity of previous album covers, as Eddie no longer exhibits either his lobotomy or cyborg enhancements.

Three versions of the cover exist. The original 1990 version has Eddie bursting from his grave and grabbing a gravedigger (with the likeness of the band's manager, Rod Smallwood) by the neck. However, Smallwood disliked the figure and asked artist Derek Riggs to remove him from the cover for the 1998 re-release, although the original artwork is used on the disc itself. Additionally, an inscription was added to the plaque on the tomb, which Riggs had initially left blank to allow the band to add their own words; the inscription reads "After the Daylight, The Night of Pain, That is not Dead, Which Can Rise Again." The picture disc LP shows Eddie firing a weapon made of four machine guns (a reference to the album's opening track, "Tailgunner"). It has the original cover on side two.

== Critical reception ==
Professional ratings
Review scores
Source	Rating
AllMusic	2/5 stars
Collector's Guide to Heavy Metal	7/10
Entertainment Weekly	C+
Sputnikmusic	2/5

The album received generally mixed to negative reviews, with AllMusic commenting that "the songwriting wasn't up to snuff when compared to such classics as Killers or Number of the Beast" and "as a whole doesn't measure up to the hits." Sputnikmusic were equally negative, stating that "No Prayer for the Dying is a plain, listless record that never really gets itself going."

== Track listing ==
Side one
No.	Title	Writer(s)	Length
1.	"Tailgunner"	Steve Harris; Bruce Dickinson	4:13
2.	"Holy Smoke"	Harris; Dickinson	3:47
3.	"No Prayer for the Dying"	Harris	4:22
4.	"Public Enema Number One"	Dave Murray; Dickinson	4:03
5.	"Fates Warning"	Murray; Harris	4:09

Side two
No.	Title	Writer(s)	Length
6.	"The Assassin"	Harris	4:16
7.	"Run Silent Run Deep"	Harris; Dickinson	4:34
8.	"Hooks in You"	Dickinson; Adrian Smith	4:06
9.	"Bring Your Daughter... to the Slaughter" (Bruce Dickinson cover)	Dickinson	4:42
10.	"Mother Russia"	Harris	5:30
Total length:			43:42

1995 reissue bonus disc
No.	Title	Writer(s)	Length
1.	"All in Your Mind" (Stray cover)	Del Bromham	4:30
2.	"Kill Me Ce Soir" (Golden Earring cover)	George Kooymans; John Fenton; Barry Hay	6:17
3.	"I'm a Mover" (Free cover)	Andy Fraser; Paul Rodgers	3:29
4.	"Communication Breakdown" (Led Zeppelin cover)	Jimmy Page; John Bonham; John Paul Jones	2:41
Total length:			16:57

== Personnel ==
Production list acquired from the album liner notes, except where noted.

=== Iron Maiden ===
- Bruce Dickinson – vocals
- Dave Murray – guitar
- Janick Gers – guitar
- Steve Harris – bass guitar
- Nicko McBrain – drums

=== Additional musician ===
- Michael Kenney – keyboards

=== Production ===
- Martin "The Bishop" Birch – producer, engineer, mixing
- Mick McKenna – assistant engineer
- Les Kingham – assistant engineer
- Chris Marshall – assistant mixing engineer
- Derek Riggs – cover illustration
- Ross Halfin – photography
- Hugh Gilmour – art direction, design (1998 edition)
- Sarah Polglase – project manager (1998 edition)

== Charts ==
Chart (1990–1991)	Peak position
Australian Albums (ARIA)	23
Austrian Albums (Ö3 Austria)	19
Canada Top Albums/CDs (RPM)	27
Dutch Albums (Album Top 100)	31
Finnish Albums (The Official Finnish Charts)	2
French Albums (SNEP)	28
German Albums (Offizielle Top 100)	7
Hungarian Albums (MAHASZ)	21
Irish Albums (The International Federation of the Phonographic Industry)	4
Italian Albums (Musica e dischi)	15
Japanese Albums (Oricon)	13
New Zealand Albums (RMNZ)	17
Norwegian Albums (VG-lista)	4
Spanish Albums (AFYVE)	15
Swedish Albums (Sverigetopplistan)	6
Swiss Albums (Schweizer Hitparade)	11
UK Albums (Official Charts)	2
US Billboard 200	17

Chart (2019)	Peak position
Belgian Albums (Ultratop Wallonia)	118
UK Rock & Metal Albums (Official Charts)	14

== Certifications ==
Region	Certification	Certified units/sales
Canada (Music Canada)	Platinum	100,000^{^}
Italy (FIMI)	Gold	100,000
United Kingdom (BPI)	Gold	100,000^{^}
United States (RIAA)	Gold	500,000^{^}
^{^} Shipments figures based on certification alone.
