= Out of the Silent Planet (song) =

2000 single by Iron Maiden

Single by Iron Maiden

from the album Brave New World
- B-side: "Wasted Years" (live); "Aces High" (live)
- Released: 23 October 2000
- Recorded: 1999–2000
- Genre: Heavy metal
- Length: 6:25 (album version); 4:10 (single version)
- Label: EMI
- Songwriters: Janick Gers, Bruce Dickinson, Steve Harris
- Producers: Kevin Shirley, Steve Harris

Iron Maiden singles chronology
"The Wicker Man" (2000)	"Out of the Silent Planet" (2000)	"Run to the Hills (Live in 2001)" (2002)

Limited Edition cover

"Out of the Silent Planet" is a single from the Iron Maiden album Brave New World, released in 2000.

== Synopsis ==
The single features two live tracks from the 1999 Ed Hunter tour, which featured the band reunited with guitarist Adrian Smith and vocalist Bruce Dickinson, as well as the promotional video for "Out of the Silent Planet." Cover art was by Mark Wilkinson. According to interviews with band members, the song was primarily influenced by the science fiction movie Forbidden Planet. (In addition, the name "Out of the Silent Planet" is a reference to the 1938 C.S. Lewis science fiction novel by the same title.)

Despite being one of only two singles from the album, this was not played on the majority of the accompanying world tour--only in a few encores in South America.

The guitar solo in the song is played by Janick Gers.

The music video is a recording of the band's European leg of their Brave New World Tour.

The regular single and the limited edition numbered single were both the same, which was unusual for Iron Maiden releases. The 12" Picture Disc LP had the limited edition cover with Eddie at the podium on side A and the reporters on side B. All three versions had the same tracks, also unusual for multiple Iron Maiden singles of the same title.

== Track listing ==
=== CD versions ===
1. "Out of the Silent Planet" (Edited Version) (Janick Gers, Steve Harris, Bruce Dickinson) – 4:10
2. "Wasted Years" (live - Filaforum, Milano, Italy, 23 September 1999) (Adrian Smith) – 5:07
3. "Aces High" (live - Plaza Del Toros, Madrid, Spain, 26 September 1999) (Harris) – 5:24
4. "Out of the Silent Planet" (video) (Gers, Harris, Dickinson) – 4:10

=== 12" Picture Disc ===
1. A1 - "Out of the Silent Planet" (Edited Version) (Gers, Harris, Dickinson) – 4:10
2. B1 - "Wasted Years" (live - Filaforum, Milano, Italy, 23 September 1999) (Smith) – 5:07
3. B2 - "Aces High" (live - Plaza Del Toros, Madrid, Spain, 26 September 1999) (Harris) – 5:24

=== 7" Red Vinyl ===
1. A - "Out of the Silent Planet" (Edited Version) (Gers, Harris, Dickinson)
2. B - "Aces High" (live) (Harris)

== Personnel ==
Production credits are adapted from the CD, and picture disc covers.

Iron Maiden

- Bruce Dickinson – lead vocals
- Dave Murray – guitar
- Janick Gers – guitar
- Adrian Smith – guitar, backing vocals ("Wasted Years")
- Steve Harris – bass guitar, co-producer ("Out of the Silent Planet")
- Nicko McBrain – drums

Production

- Kevin Shirley – producer, mixing, editing ("Out of the Silent Planet")
- George Marino – mastering ("Out of the Silent Planet")
- Doug Hall – mixing ("Wasted Years", "Aces High")
- Simon Heyworth – mastering ("Wasted Years", "Aces High")
- Mark Wilkinson – sleeve illustration
- Hugh Gilmour – packaging
- Ross Halfin – photography

== Charts ==
Weekly chart performance for "Out of the Silent Planet"
Chart (2000)	Peak position
Finland (Suomen virallinen lista)	13
France (SNEP)	72
Germany (GfK)	66
Italy (FIMI)	10
Netherlands (Single Top 100)	87
Portugal (AFP)	5
Spain (Promusicae)	16
Sweden (Sverigetopplistan)	35
UK Singles (OCC)	20
UK Rock & Metal (OCC)	2
