= Satellite 15... The Final Frontier =

Promotional single by Iron Maiden

from the album The Final Frontier
- Released: 13 July 2010
- Recorded: 2010
- Studio: Compass Point, Nassau, Bahamas
- Genre: Heavy metal; space rock
- Length: 4:05 (single version); 8:40 (album version)
- Label: EMI
- Songwriters: Adrian Smith; Steve Harris
- Producer: Kevin Shirley

"Satellite 15... The Final Frontier" (or simply "The Final Frontier") is the first track from British heavy metal band Iron Maiden's album The Final Frontier. A short teaser for the song's music video was released on 9 July 2010 and an announcement of the full video's release was made on 13 July.

== Lyrics ==
The lyrics of the song are about a man who is stranded in space contemplating the final moments of his life. In this sense, the titular chorus line "The final frontier" takes on a double meaning: as well as referring to space, it also means passing the final frontier of life, into death.

The line "Too close to the sun, I surely will burn, like Icarus before me or so legend goes," is a reference to the ancient Greek myth of Icarus (also the subject of the band's 1983 song "Flight of Icarus").

== Music video ==
The music video, presenting a 4-minute edit of the song ("The Final Frontier"), shows an astronaut (Gudmundur Thorvaldsson) on a quest to destroy an unnamed planet. He is pursued and attacked by an alien incarnation of Eddie, the band's mascot, before apparently killing him. Back on the spaceship, Eddie has sneaked aboard and ejects the astronaut into space, shortly before himself destroying the planet using a pyramidal relic (that the astronaut himself had just recovered from the planet) and the key featured on the album cover.

The video was created in eight weeks from a mixture of live action, CGI, and 3D animation by Darkside Animation Films. Written by Dirk Maggs, the live-action sequences were directed by Nick Scott Studios and shot in Rendlesham Forest.

The song's guitar solo, lasting from about 6:32 to 7:16, is a trade-off divided into two parts; the first is played by Adrian Smith (6:32-7:01), while the second is played by Dave Murray (7:01-7:16).

== Track listing ==
| No. | Title | Writer(s) | Length |
|---|---|---|---|
| 1. | "Satellite 15... The Final Frontier" (Director's Cut Music Video) | Adrian Smith, Steve Harris | 5:00 |
| 2. | "Satellite 15... The Final Frontier" (Short Version) | Smith, Harris | 4:05 |

== Personnel ==
Production credits are adapted from the radio promo cover.

Iron Maiden

- Bruce Dickinson – vocals
- Dave Murray – guitar
- Adrian Smith – guitar
- Janick Gers – guitar
- Steve Harris – bass guitar, co-producer
- Nicko McBrain – drums

Production

- Kevin Shirley – producer, mixing
- Nick Scott Studios – director (promo video)
- Darkside Animation Films – producer (promo video)
- Anthony Dry – cover illustration
- Peacock – art direction, design
