= El Dorado (song) =

Single by Iron Maiden

from the album The Final Frontier
- Released: 8 June 2010
- Recorded: Compass Point Studios, Nassau, Bahamas in 2010
- Genre: Heavy metal
- Length: 6:49
- Label: EMI
- Songwriters: Bruce Dickinson, Adrian Smith, Steve Harris
- Producer: Kevin Shirley

Iron Maiden singles chronology
| "Different World" (2006) | "El Dorado" (2010) | "Speed of Light" (2015) |

"El Dorado" is the second track from English heavy metal band Iron Maiden's 2010 album The Final Frontier. The song is the band's forty-first single, and the only one from the album. It is also the last single to use the band's alternate logo. The song was released as a free download on the band's official site at 00:01 on 8 June 2010 (UTC), one day before the album's supporting tour began. Released ten weeks before The Final Frontier, it marks the longest time between the release of an Iron Maiden single and the studio album it is featured on since 1980's "Running Free". The cover art was created by Anthony Dry and is based on the covers of the EC Comics published by William Gaines that were popular in the 1950s. Regarding the early online release of the song, vocalist Bruce Dickinson explained, "El Dorado is a preview of the forthcoming studio album. As we will be including it in the set of our Final Frontier World Tour, we thought it would be great to thank all our fans and get them into The Final Frontier mood by giving them this song up front of the tour and album release."

Dickinson explained that the lyrics are a cynical critique of the 2008 financial crisis, comparing the bankers responsible with the people who sold the myth of El Dorado:

[El Dorado] has a cynical lyric about the economic crap that's been happening. It seemed a bit like a perfect storm; people were borrowing money like crazy. I thought, "This is really going to screw people up" and sure enough, we're all in deep doo-doo! And that's what El Dorado is about, it's about selling somebody the myth that "The streets are paved with gold" and them asking, "Where do I sign up?"

"El Dorado" won the Grammy Award for Best Metal Performance in 2011. It is the band's first win following two previous nominations ("Fear of the Dark" in 1994 and "The Wicker Man" in 2001).

The song's guitar solo, which lasts from about 3:42 to 4:23, is a trade-off divided into three parts; the first is played by Adrian Smith (3:42–3:53), the second by Dave Murray (3:53–4:06), and the third, which segues into the verse riff again, by Janick Gers (4:06–4:23).

== Personnel ==
Iron Maiden

- Bruce Dickinson – vocals
- Dave Murray – guitars
- Adrian Smith – guitars
- Janick Gers – guitars
- Steve Harris – bass, co-producer
- Nicko McBrain – drums

Production

- Kevin Shirley – producer, mixing
- Jared Kvitka – engineer
- Anthony Dry – cover illustration
- Peacock – Art direction, design
