= Bruce Dickinson discography =

- Studio albums: 7
- Live albums: 2
- Compilation albums: 1
- Singles: 15
- Video albums: 3
- Music videos: 14
- Box sets: 1
- Other appearances: 15

Bruce Dickinson, a British heavy metal singer, has released seven studio albums, two live albums, one compilation, ten singles, three video albums, fourteen music videos, and one box set. In 1979, after playing in local groups, Dickinson joined hard rock band Samson. He departed after two years to become Iron Maiden's lead vocalist. His debut with this band is considered a "masterpiece", which was followed with a series of top-ten releases. In 1989, while Iron Maiden were taking a year off, Dickinson and former Gillan guitarist, Janick Gers, composed a song for a film soundtrack. His solo debut, Tattooed Millionaire (1990), was an effort that favoured a hard rock/pop metal approach, different from what fans assumed would be an aggressive, Iron Maiden-like album. Four songs—the title track, "Dive! Dive! Dive!", "Born in '58", and a cover version of David Bowie's "All the Young Dudes"—were released as singles. Dickinson returned to Iron Maiden, accompanied by Gers as the new guitarist, and the project went on hiatus. Dive! Dive! Live! was a live video recorded from a concert in Los Angeles, California, in August 1990, and released in July 1991.

After a farewell tour in 1993, Dickinson left Iron Maiden and started working on a second album with Tribe of Gypsies guitarist and band leader, Roy Z. In June 1994, he released Balls to Picasso, which reached the top 30 in several countries. Allmusic deemed the album "somewhat of a disappointment" which failed to "come up with anything truly groundbreaking", except for "Tears of the Dragon", which was released as a single, along with "Shoot All the Clowns". Roy Z departed to continue with his work and Dickinson recruited new members, with whom he released the double-disc live performance, Alive in Studio A. The third album, Skunkworks, was released in 1996, marking a "highly approved stylistic shift". The single "Back from the Edge" was released to promote this effort. A live video and an EP were recorded from a concert in Spain, and released in Japan, as Skunkworks Live.

Due to musical differences, the Skunkworks line-up split up, and Dickinson once again was joined by Roy Z, along with then ex-Iron Maiden guitarist, Adrian Smith. The follow-up album, Accident of Birth (1997), marked a return to a heavier sound for Dickinson. The title track and "Man of Sorrows" were released as singles. The next year he released a semi-concept album on alchemy, The Chemical Wedding, which was described as a "modern metal aesthetic". The "muscular anthem", "Killing Floor", was the album's single. The live album, Scream for Me Brazil, documented a 1999 live performance in São Paulo during the supporting tour. That year, Dickinson and Smith rejoined Iron Maiden, and the project once again went on hiatus. He released a "best of…" album in 2001, which included two new songs, "Broken" and "Silver Wings". On 23 May 2005, Dickinson released his first album in seven years, Tyranny of Souls. To commemorate this, all of his past releases were remastered, with his studio efforts containing bonus tracks, and the live recordings merged into a single box set, entitled Alive. The 2006 DVD, Anthology, contained three live performances, all of the promo videos, and over an hour of extras. Since Dickinson joined Iron Maiden in 1981 he's sold well over 100 mln albums as of 2024.

== Albums ==
=== Studio albums ===
Year	Album details	Peak chart positions								
Year	Album details	UK	AUT	FIN	GER	JPN	NLD	SWE	SWI	US
1990	Tattooed Millionaire: Released: 8 May 1990; Label: EMI (CDP 79 4273 2); Format: CD, LP, CS	14	—	7	39	—	—	33	35	100
1994	Balls to Picasso: Released: 6 June 1994; Label: EMI (8-29682-2); Format: CD, LP, CS	21	26	6	46	25	82	8	29	185
1996	Skunkworks: Released: 19 February 1996; Label: Sanctuary (SMEDD196); Format: CD, LP, CS	41	—	14	—	69	—	40	—	—
1997	Accident of Birth: Released: 3 June 1997; Label: Castle (0000124RAW); Format: CD, LP, CS	53	—	13	52	30	93	46	—	—
1998	The Chemical Wedding: Released: 14 September 1998; Label: Sanctuary (SMRCD214); Format: CD, LP, CS	55	—	22	41	64	—	31	—	—
2005	Tyranny of Souls: Released: 23 May 2005; Label: Sanctuary (MYNCD035); Format: CD	65	56	10	39	75	96	10	73	180
2024	The Mandrake Project: Released: 1 March 2024; Label: BMG; Format: CD, LP, digital	3	1	2	1	—	6	1	2	176
"—" denotes releases that did not chart or were not released in that country.

=== Live albums ===
Year	Album details	Notes
1995	Alive in Studio A: Released: February 1995; Label: Castle (RAWDD102); Format: CD, LP, CS	The album was released as a double-disc set. The first CD was recorded live in the studio, and the second one at the Marquee Club. It peaked at number 96 in the UK.
1999	Scream for Me Brazil: Released: 2 November 1999; Label: Sanctuary (NR 4502); Format: CD	This was a 70-minute-long disc recorded in São Paulo, 1999, during the "Chemical Wedding world tour". It is the second Bruce Dickinson tour to include Adrian Smith on guitar. The album peaked at number 177 in the UK.

=== Compilation albums ===
Year	Album details	Peak chart positions				Notes
Year	Album details	UK	FIN	GER	SWE	Notes
2001	The Best of Bruce Dickinson: Released: 25 September 2001; Label: Metal-Is (MISCD014); Format: CD	141	6	72	42	It includes two new songs, "Broken" and "Silver Wings". The UK release added a fourteen-track bonus CD, containing rare songs that had only appeared as B-sides on singles.
2018	Scream for Me Sarajevo: A Story of Hope in a Time of War: Released: 2 June 2018; Label: BMG; Format: CD, LP	—	—	—	—	

== Singles ==
Year	Title	Peak chart positions				Album
Year	Title	UK	FIN	IRL	US Main.	Album
1990	"Tattooed Millionaire"	18	14	—	—	Tattooed Millionaire
1990	"All the Young Dudes"	23	10	25	—	Tattooed Millionaire
1990	"Dive! Dive! Dive!"	45	—	—	—	Tattooed Millionaire
1990	"Born in '58"	81	—	—	—	Tattooed Millionaire
1994	"Tears of the Dragon"	28	6	—	36	Balls to Picasso
1994	"Shoot All the Clowns"	37	20	—	—	Balls to Picasso
1995	"Sacred Cowboys" #	—	—	—	—	Balls to Picasso
1996	"Back from the Edge"	68	—	—	—	Skunkworks
1996	"Solar Confinement"	—	—	—	—	Skunkworks
1997	"Accident of Birth"	54	—	—	—	Accident of Birth
1997	"Man of Sorrows" §#	—	—	—	—	Accident of Birth
1998	"Killing Floor" §	—	—	—	—	The Chemical Wedding
2023	"Afterglow of Ragnarok"	4	—	—	—	The Mandrake Project
2024	"Rain on the Graves"	—	—	—	—	The Mandrake Project
2024	"Resurrection Men"	—	—	—	—	The Mandrake Project
2026	"Speaking in Tongues"	—	—	—	—	PsychoGod
"—" denotes releases that did not chart or were not released in that country. "§" denotes Japanese release only. # denotes UK promotional single release only.

== Other charted songs ==
Year	Title	Peak	Album
Year	Title	FIN Air.	Album
2024	"Many Doors to Hell"	68	The Mandrake Project

== Video albums ==
Year	Video details	Peak chart positions							Notes
Year	Video details	UK	DEN	FIN	FRA	ITA	SWE	US	Notes
1991	Dive! Dive! Live!: Released: 1 July 1991; Label: PMI (PMI49073); Format: VHS, LASERDISC	—	—	—	—	—	—	—	The show was filmed in Los Angeles, California, on 14 August 1990, during the Tattooed Millionaire U.S. tour leg. It was directed by James Yukich, known for his work with Iron Maiden's Live After Death.
1997	Skunkworks Live Video: Released: 1997; Label: Victor (VIVP-66); Format: VHS	—	—	—	—	—	—	—	A live performance filmed on 31 May and 1 June 1996, in Pamplona and Gerona, Spain, during the Skunkwoks world tour. It was directed by Julian Doyle and released only in Japan.
2006	Anthology: Released: 20 June 2006; Label: Sanctuary (SVE4011); Format: DVD	3	3	2	20	9	10	36	A three-DVD package that contained the live performances, Dive! Dive! Live! (1991), Skunkworks Live Video (1997), and Scream for Me Brazil (1999), plus all the promo videos and over one hour of extras and unreleased footage.

== Music videos ==
Year	Title	Director
1990	"Tattooed Millionaire"	Storm Thorgerson
1990	"All the Young Dudes"	Storm Thorgerson
1990	"Dive! Dive! Dive!"	Jim Yukich
1990	"Born in '58"	Jim Yukich
1994	"Tears of the Dragon"	Howard Greenhalgh
1994	"Shoot All the Clowns"	Howard Greenhalgh
1996	"Back From the Edge"	Bruce Dickinson
1996	"Inertia"	Bruce Dickinson
1997	"Accident of Birth"	Bruce Dickinson
1997	"Man of Sorrows"	Bruce Dickinson
1997	"Road to Hell"	Bruce Dickinson
1998	"Killing Floor"	Julian Doyle
1998	"The Tower"	Julian Doyle
2005	"Abduction"	Julian Doyle

== Box sets ==
Year	Box set details	Notes
2005	Alive: Released: 23 May 2005; Label: Sanctuary (86393); Format: CD	A three-disc box set, which compiled the live performances, Alive in Studio A/Alive at the Marquee (1995) and Scream for Me Brazil (1999). It was released on 23 May 2005 worldwide,—and on 21 June 2005 in the US—to celebrate the release of Tyranny of Souls.

== Other appearances ==
Year	Song	Album	Ref.
1989	"Bring Your Daughter to the Slaughter"	A Nightmare on Elm Street 5 OST	
1989	"Smoke on the Water"	The Earthquake Album by Rock Aid Armenia	
1992	"(I Want to Be) Elected"	None (single)	
1994	"Sabbath Bloody Sabbath"	Nativity in Black: A Tribute to Black Sabbath	
1997	"Bohemian Rhapsody"	Friends for Life	
1997	"Elected"	Bean OST (originally released in 1992 for Comic Relief)	
1998	"The Zoo"	ECW: Extreme Music	
1998	"Trumpets of Jericho"	Child's Play 4: The Bride of Chucky OST	
1999	"Black Widow"	Humanary Stew: A Tribute to Alice Cooper	
2000	"Into the Black Hole"	Universal Migrator Part 2: Flight of the Migrator	
2000	"The One You Love to Hate"	Resurrection	
2000	"Wannabe Gangstar"	Wheatus	
2005	"Shout it Out Loud"	Sheep in KISS Make Up	
2005	"Beast in the Light"	Execution	
2008	"Chemical Wedding"	Chemical Wedding OST	
2008	"Man of Sorrows"	Chemical Wedding OST	
2010	"2 Minutes Silence"	Video by The Royal British Legion	
2012	"Second Movement: Andante"	Concerto for Group and Orchestra by Jon Lord	
2013	"Behind Blue Eyes", "Black Night", "Emerald"	The Sunflower Superjam 2012: Live at the Royal Albert Hall	

== See also ==
- Iron Maiden discography
- Samson discography
