= List of Bruce Dickinson band members =

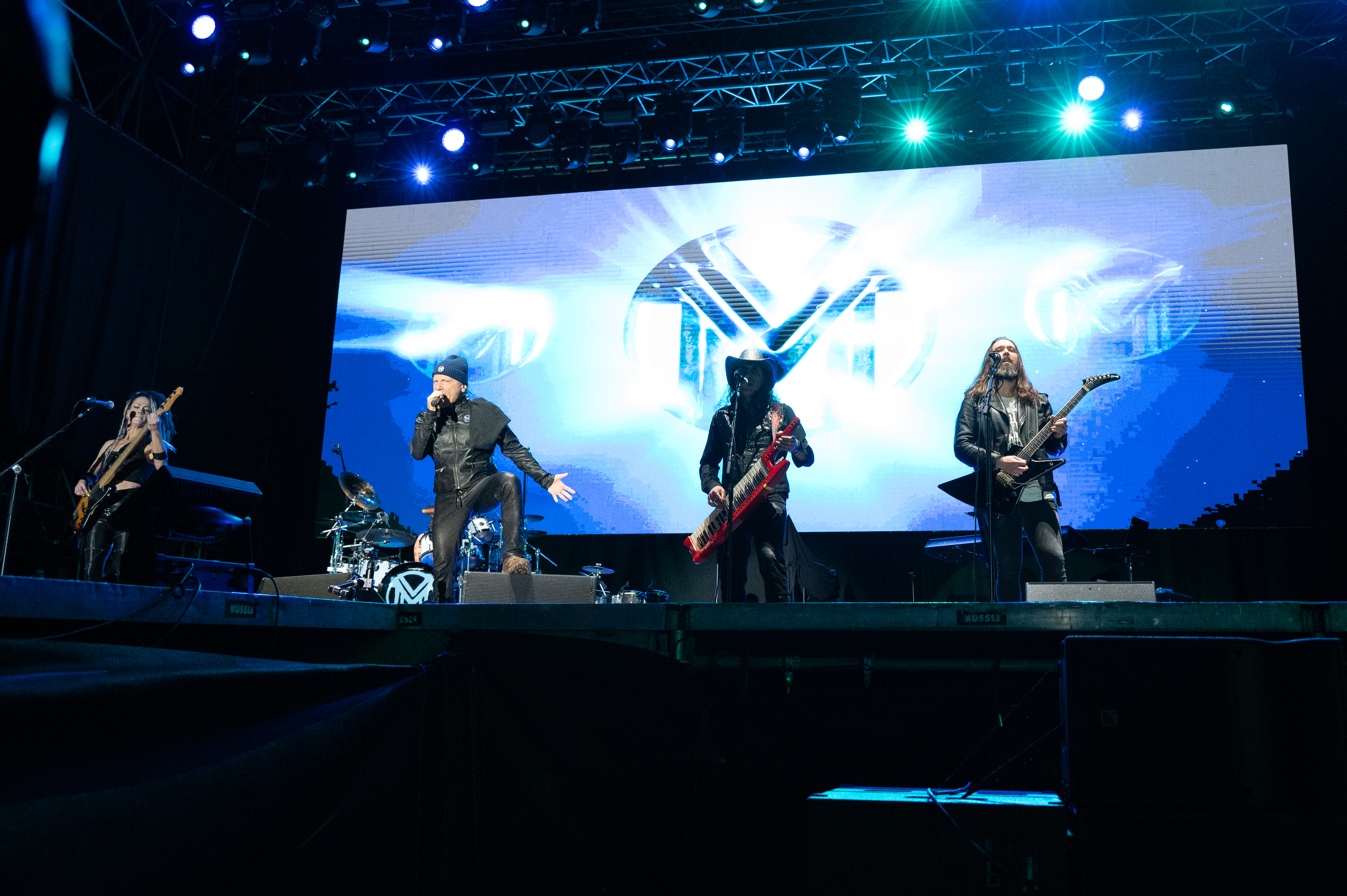
Dickinson and his band performing in 2024

Bruce Dickinson is a heavy metal singer, whose career has spanned more than three decades. In early 1989, during his first tenure in Iron Maiden, Zomba asked Dickinson to contribute a track for the film A Nightmare on Elm Street 5: The Dream Child, providing a budget, a studio, and a producer, Chris Tsangarides. Dickinson took up the opportunity and called an old friend of his, former Gillan guitarist Janick Gers. Shortly after meeting, they had "Bring Your Daughter to the Slaughter" ready for the studio, which was recorded with the assistance of bassist Andy Carr and drummer Fabio del Rio. Impressed with the results, Zomba convinced Dickinson to record a full album using the same line-up, leading to 1990's Tattooed Millionaire. A supporting tour followed, for which an unavailable Del Rio was replaced by drummer Dickie Fliszar.

== History ==
To concentrate on his second solo effort, Balls to Picasso, Dickinson left Iron Maiden in 1993 and collaborated with American producer, Keith Olsen. Two attempts at recording the album were made with Olsen as producer, using drummer Dickie Fliszar and guitarist Myke Gray of Skin, bassist Jim Crichton of Saga and various session musicians. Unhappy with the results of these sessions, Dickinson began working with Tribe of Gypsies guitarist Roy Z and started the record from scratch. Released in 1994, the album was recorded with Tribe of Gypsies as the backing band, which then included Z, bassist Eddie Casillas and drummer Dave Ingraham (percussionist Mario Aguilar and vocalist Dean Ortega also guested on the song "Shoot All the Clowns"), in addition to percussionist Doug Van Booven, while Fliszar's drum parts from the Olsen sessions were retained for the closing track, "Tears of the Dragon". Due to Tribe of Gypsies unavailability, Dickinson had to put a new band together for the release's supporting tour. This group featured guitarist and writer Alex Dickson, bassist Chris Dale and drummer Alessandro Elena. Following the tour, during which the 1995 live album Alive in Studio A was recorded, Dickinson decided to use the band on his third solo release, 1996's Skunkworks. Although Dickinson wanted Skunkworks to be the band's name, the record label (Raw Power) refused to release the album without his name on the cover.

Due to musical differences, the Skunkworks line-up disbanded at the supporting tour's conclusion. After a short period of inactivity, Dickinson once again teamed up with Roy Z to record his next album, 1997's Accident of Birth, which also featured Balls to Picasso contributors and Tribe of Gypsies members Eddie Casillas and Dave Ingraham. Former Iron Maiden guitarist Adrian Smith was asked to guest but remained as a full-time member. The line-up stayed intact for a further studio album, 1998's The Chemical Wedding, before Dickinson and Smith rejoined Iron Maiden in 1999. Although Z was unable to take part in The Chemical Wedding's supporting tour (his replacement was guitar technician Richard Carette), he did take part in the 1999 live album, Scream for Me Brazil.

In 2001, the compilation album, The Best of Bruce Dickinson, was released, which featured two new tracks recorded with drummer Dickie Fliszar and Roy Z on all other instruments. In the summer of 2002, while Iron Maiden were taking a break from touring, Dickinson decided to play a series of European festival shows. For these performances, Dickinson formed a band featuring Skunkworks collaborators Alex Dickson and Chris Dale (who had formed their own group, Sack Trick), drummer Robin Guy and guitarist Pete Friesen. For 2005's Tyranny of Souls, Dickinson once again teamed up with Roy Z. The composition of the release's songs began in 2003, which largely involved Z sending recordings of riffs to Dickinson while he was on tour with Iron Maiden. For the album's recording, the drums and keyboards were performed respectively by David Moreno and Giuseppe Iampieri (credited as "Maestro Mistheria"), while the bass parts were contributed by Ray Burke, Juan Perez and Roy Z, who also undertook all of the guitar work.

In 2023, Dickinson performed Deep Purple's Concerto for Group and Orchestra on a tour, the band included guitarist Kaitner Z Doka, drummer Bernhard Welz, keyboardist John O'Hara, bassist Tanya O'Callaghan and percussionist Mario Argandonia, alongside many different Orchestras.

Dickinson played his first solo show in 22 years at the Whisky A Go Go on 12 April 2024, the line-up included guitarists Chris Declercq and Philip Näslund, bassist Tanya O'Callaghan, drummer Dave Moreno and keyboardist Mistheria. Long-time guitarist Roy Z was absent due to personal issues.

== Members ==
=== Current members ===
Image	Name	Years active	Instruments	Release contributions
	Bruce Dickinson	1989–present	vocals; tambourine	all releases
	Maestro Mistheria (Giuseppe Iampieri)	2024–present (session 2005)	keytar; backing vocals; keyboards	Tyranny of Souls (2005); The Mandrake Project (2024); PscyhoGod(2027)
	Dave Moreno	2024–present (session 2005)	drums; backing vocals	Tyranny of Souls (2005); The Mandrake Project (2024); PscyhoGod(2027)
	Tanya O'Callaghan	2024–present (touring 2023)	bass; backing vocals	PsychoGod (2027)
	Chris Declercq	2024–present	guitars; backing vocals	The Mandrake Project (2024) one trackPsychoGod (2027)
	Philip Näslund	2024–present	guitars; backing vocals	PsychoGod (2027)

=== Former members ===
Image	Name	Years active	Instruments	Release contributions
	Janick Gers	1989–1990	guitars	Tattooed Millionaire (1990); Dive! Dive! Live! (1990 live video)
	Andy Carr	1989–1990	bass; backing vocals	Tattooed Millionaire (1990); Dive! Dive! Live! (1990 live video)
	Fabio del Rio	1989–1990	drums	Tattooed Millionaire (1990)
	Dickie Fliszar	1990; 1994; 2001	drums; backing vocals	Dive! Dive! Live! (1990 live video); "Tears of the Dragon" (1994 single); "Silver Wings" and "Broken" from The Best of Bruce Dickinson (2001 compilation)
	Roy Z	1993–1994; 1996–2001; 2003–2024	guitars; bass; keyboards	Balls to Picasso (1994) and all releases from Accident of Birth (1997) to The Mandrake Project (2024)
	Eddie Casillas	1993–1994; 1996–1999	bass	Balls to Picasso (1994); then from Accident of Birth (1997) to Scream for Me Brazil (1999 live)
	David Ingraham	1993–1994; 1996–1999	drums	Balls to Picasso (1994); then from Accident of Birth (1997) to Scream for Me Brazil (1999 live)
	Alex Dickson	1995–1996	guitars	Alive in Studio A (1995 live); Skunkworks (1996)
	Chris Dale	1995–1996	bass	Alive in Studio A (1995 live); Skunkworks (1996)
	Alessandro Elena	1995–1996	drums	Alive in Studio A (1995 live); Skunkworks (1996)
	Adrian Smith	1996–1999	guitars; keyboards	all releases from Accident of Birth (1997) to Scream for Me Brazil (1999 live)

=== Session musicians ===
Image	Name	Years active	Instruments	Release contributions
	Myke Gray	1993	guitars	Balls to Picasso (2005 reissue bonus tracks)
	Jim Crichton	1993	bass	Balls to Picasso (2005 reissue bonus tracks)
	Richard Baker	1993–1994; 1997	keyboards; piano; programming	Balls to Picasso (1994); Accident of Birth (1997)
	Doug Van Booven	1993–1994	percussion	Balls to Picasso (1994)
	Mario Aguilar	1993–1994	percussion	"Shoot All the Clowns" (1994 single)
	Dean Ortega	1993–1994	backing vocals	"Shoot All the Clowns" (1994 single)
	Greg Schultz	1998	keyboards	The Chemical Wedding (1998)
	Juan Perez	2005	bass	Tyranny of Souls (2005)
	Ray Burke	2005	bass	Tyranny of Souls (2005)

=== Touring musicians ===
Image	Name	Years active	Instruments	Release contributions
	Richard Carette	1998–1999	guitars	Roy Z's guitar technician briefly replaced him when he was unavailable for The Chemical Wedding tour.
	Pete Friesen	2002	guitars	Friesen and Guy played with Dickinson at European festivals in 2002.
	Robin Guy	2002 (died 2024)	drums	Friesen and Guy played with Dickinson at European festivals in 2002.
	Bernhard Welz	2023	drums	Played with Dickinson on his Concerto for Group and Orchestra tour.
	Kaitner Z Doka	2023	guitars	Played with Dickinson on his Concerto for Group and Orchestra tour.
	John O'Hara	2023	keyboards	Played with Dickinson on his Concerto for Group and Orchestra tour.
	Mario Argandonia	2023	percussion	Played with Dickinson on his Concerto for Group and Orchestra tour.
