= Anthology (Bruce Dickinson video) =

Video by Bruce Dickinson
- Released: 20 June 2006
- Recorded: August 1990; May–June 1996; 1999
- Genre: Heavy metal, hard rock, alternative rock
- Length: 6 Hours Approx.
- Label: Sanctuary

Bruce Dickinson chronology
Skunkworks Live Video (1997)	Anthology (2006)

Anthology is a 3 disc compilation DVD by Bruce Dickinson, the lead singer of Iron Maiden. The DVD features three live performances as well every single promotional video made during Dickinson's solo career. The DVD also includes over an hour of extras and unreleased footage. It was released on 19 June 2006 and features a special cardboard sleeve and an 8-page booklet. The cover features William Blake's watercolour/inking The Whirlwind: Ezekiel's Vision of the Cherubim and Eyed Wheels.

== Disc 1 ==
=== Dive! Dive! Live! ===
Disc 1 features two live performances, the first of which is from the Tattooed Millionaire tour, Dickinson's first as a solo artist. The video was originally released in 1991 under the title Dive! Dive! Live! and was recorded on 14 August 1990 at the Town and Country Club, Los Angeles, California. The band included future Iron Maiden member Janick Gers on guitar as well as Andy Carr on bass and Dickie Fliszar on drums. The show was directed by Jim Yukich and produced by Paul Flattery.

Track listing

All songs written by Bruce Dickinson and Janick Gers, except where noted.

1. "Riding with the Angels" (Russ Ballard)
2. "Born in '58"
3. "Lickin' the Gun"
4. "Gypsy Road"
5. "Dive! Dive! Dive!"
6. "Drum solo"
7. "Zulu Lulu"
8. "Ballad of Mutt"
9. "Son of a Gun"
10. "Hell on Wheels"
11. "All the Young Dudes" (David Bowie)
12. "Tattooed Millionaire"
13. "No Lies"
14. "Fog on the Tyne" (Alan Hull)
15. "Winds of Change"
16. "Sin City" (Bon Scott, Angus Young, Malcolm Young)
17. "Bring Your Daughter... to the Slaughter" (Dickinson)
18. "Black Night" (Ritchie Blackmore, Ian Gillan, Roger Glover, Jon Lord, Ian Paice)

=== Skunkworks Live ===
The second live performance is from the Skunkworks tour and was originally released in 1997 as Skunkworks Live. The footage is composed of two concerts, filmed in Pamplona and Girona, Spain on 31 May 1996 and 1 June 1996 respectively, originally recorded for a four track EP released only in Japan, also named Skunkworks Live. The band includes Alex Dickson on guitars, Chris Dale on bass and Alessandro Elena on drums. The video was directed by Julian Doyle and produced by Jeremy Azis.

Track listing

All songs written and composed by Bruce Dickinson and Alex Dickson, except where noted.

1. "Space Race"
2. "Back from the Edge"
3. "Tattooed Millionaire" (Dickinson, Janick Gers)
4. "Inertia"
5. "Faith"
6. "Meltdown"
7. "I Will Not Accept the Truth"
8. "Laughing in the Hiding Bush"
9. "Tears of the Dragon" (Dickinson)
10. "God's Not Coming Back"
11. "Dreamstate"
12. "The Prisoner" (Steve Harris, Adrian Smith)

== Disc 2 ==
=== Scream for Me Brazil ===
Disc 2 features a live performance from The Chemical Wedding tour. The show is entitled Scream for Me Brazil and was filmed in São Paulo, Brazil in 1999. The footage is not an official recording, but is actually taken from the feed that supplied the screen inside the venue and so is not of the usual quality expected of a live DVD. The band for this show includes Dickinson's songwriting partner Roy Z on guitar, fellow Iron Maiden member Adrian Smith also on guitar, Eddie Casillas on bass and Dave Ingraham on the drums. This was Dickinson's last solo tour before he and Adrian Smith rejoined Iron Maiden.

Track listing

All songs written by Bruce Dickinson and Roy Z, except where noted.

1. "King In Crimson"
2. "Gates of Urizen"
3. "Killing Floor" (Dickinson, Adrian Smith)
4. "Book of Thel" (Dickinson, Z, Eddie Casillas)
5. "Tears of the Dragon" (Dickinson)
6. "Laughing in the Hiding Bush"
7. "Accident of Birth"
8. "The Tower"
9. "Darkside of Aquarius"
10. "The Road to Hell" (Dickinson, Smith)

== Disc 3 ==
The third disc includes every promotional video made during Dickinson's solo career, these include;
From Tattooed Millionaire
* "Tattooed Millionaire" (directed by Storm Thorgerson)
* "All the Young Dudes" (directed by Storm Thorgerson)
* "Dive! Dive! Dive!" (directed by Jim Yukich)
* "Born in '58" (directed by Jim Yukich)
From Balls to Picasso
* "Tears of the Dragon" (directed by Howard Greenhalgh)
* "Shoot All the Clowns" (directed by Howard Greenhalgh)
From Skunkworks
* "Back from the Edge" (directed by Bruce Dickinson)
* "Inertia" (directed by Bruce Dickinson)
From Accident of Birth
* "Accident of Birth" (directed by Bruce Dickinson)
* "Road To Hell" (directed by Bruce Dickinson)
* "Man of Sorrows" (directed by Bruce Dickinson)
From The Chemical Wedding
* "Killing Floor" (directed by Julian Doyle)
* "The Tower" (directed by Julian Doyle)
From Tyranny of Souls
* "Abduction" (directed by Julian Doyle)

The disc also includes two more features, the first being Tyranny of Souls EPK, a track by track breakdown of Dickinson's album Tyranny of Souls, explaining its concept and providing a look at the writing methods used by Dickinson and Roy Z in its creation. The second feature, entitled Biceps of Steel, is an adaptation of the Samson and Delilah Bible story filmed with Dickinson in the band Samson at the Rainbow Theatre in London. It was filmed and directed by Julien Temple who also filmed the Sex Pistols' movie; The Great Rock and Roll Swindle. The feature lasts approximately 15 minutes and was shown in cinemas prior to Hazel O'Connor's Breaking Glass in 1980.

== Reception ==
Martin Popoff wrote about disc 2: "[...] disappointment is at hand, for this is semi-boot quality in both sound and vision." Powermetal.de said Anthology is better than Iron Maiden's 2005 live album Death on the Road. Vampster said Skunkworks sounds decent but the image quality could be better. Scream for Me Brazil was noted for its worse sound quality of all of the live recordings. Soundi gave a rating of four out of five and praised the image quality of Dive! Dive! Live! and Skunkworks but the image quality of Scream for Me Brazil was noted as poor. MetalReviews wrote: "Despite the shortcomings with the sound of some of the live concert footage, this is an awesome package that every fan of Bruce's should not hesitate to add to their collection."

The album charted in seven countries, in five of them the album peaked in the top ten.
