= Alive (Bruce Dickinson album) =

Box set by Bruce Dickinson
- Released: 21 June 2005
- Genres: Heavy metal, hard rock
- Length: 3:10:39
- Label: Sanctuary Records

Bruce Dickinson chronology
Tyranny of Souls (2005)	Alive (2005)	The Mandrake Project (2024)

Professional ratings
Review scores
Source	Rating
Allmusic	3.5/5 stars

Alive is a comprehensive three-disc box set by English heavy metal singer Bruce Dickinson. It features the singer's 1990s three solo live performances: Alive in Studio A, Alive at the Marquee, and Scream for Me Brazil. It was released on 21 June 2005, just a month after the release of Tyranny of Souls.

== Track listing ==
=== Disc I: Alive in Studio A ===
No.	Title	Length
1.	"Cyclops"	7:37
2.	"Shoot All the Clowns"	4:55
3.	"Son of a Gun"	5:46
4.	"Tears of the Dragon"	6:28
5.	"1000 Points of Light"	3:54
6.	"Sacred Cowboys"	3:56
7.	"Tattooed Millionaire"	3:56
8.	"Born in '58"	3:24
9.	"Fire"	4:58
10.	"Change of Heart"	4:41
11.	"Hell No"	5:12
12.	"Laughing in the Hiding Bush"	4:04

=== Disc II: Alive at the Marquee ===
1. "Cyclops"
2. "1000 Points of Light"
3. "Born in 58"
4. "Gods of War"
5. "Change of Heart"
6. "Laughing in the Hiding Bush"
7. "Hell No"
8. "Tears of the Dragon"
9. "Shoot All the Clowns"
10. "Sacred Cowboys"
11. "Son of a Gun"
12. "Tattooed Millionaire"

=== Disc III: Scream for Me Brazil ===
1. "Trumpets of Jericho"
2. "King in Crimson"
3. "Chemical Wedding"
4. "Gates of Urizen"
5. "Killing Floor"
6. "Book of Thel"
7. "Tears of the Dragon"
8. "Laughing in the Hiding Bush"
9. "Accident of Birth"
10. "The Tower"
11. "Darkside of Aquarius"
12. "Road to Hell"
