= The Best of Bruce Dickinson =

Greatest hits album by Bruce Dickinson
- Released: 25 September 2001
- Recorded: 1977, 1989–2001
- Genre: Heavy metal, hard rock, alternative rock
- Length: 2:15:10
- Label: Metal-Is
- Producer: Roy Z, Jack Endino, Shay Baby

Bruce Dickinson chronology
Scream for Me Brazil (1999)	The Best of Bruce Dickinson (2001)	Tyranny of Souls (2005)

Professional ratings
Review scores
Source	Rating
AllMusic	4.5/5 stars

The Best of Bruce Dickinson is a compilation album released in 2001 by Bruce Dickinson. Two versions were released; a single disc version and a bonus disc version. On the front cover, the album title is imposed upon the seal of the demon Astaroth.

Disc 1 is a selection of songs from his previous solo albums, with the addition of two new songs, "Broken" and "Silver Wings", both of which were written by Dickinson and guitarist/producer Roy Z. Disc 2 contains rare songs, most of which have appeared as b-sides on singles. The track "The Voice of Crube" is an explanation of the various songs, narrated by Bruce (for whom 'Crube' is an anagram).

== Track listing ==
Disc one
No.	Title	Writer(s)	Original album	Length
1.	"Broken"	Bruce Dickinson, Roy Z	new track	4:00
2.	"Tattooed Millionaire"	Bruce Dickinson, Janick Gers	Tattooed Millionaire	4:25
3.	"Laughing in the Hiding Bush" (live)	Bruce Dickinson, Austin Dickinson, Roy Z	Scream for Me Brazil	4:09
4.	"Tears of the Dragon"	Bruce Dickinson	Balls to Picasso	6:19
5.	"The Tower"	Bruce Dickinson, Roy Z	The Chemical Wedding	4:43
6.	"Born in '58"	Bruce Dickinson, Janick Gers	Tattooed Millionaire	3:36
7.	"Accident of Birth"	Bruce Dickinson, Roy Z	Accident of Birth	4:28
8.	"Silver Wings"	Bruce Dickinson, Roy Z	new track	4:16
9.	"Darkside of Aquarius"	Bruce Dickinson, Roy Z	Accident of Birth	6:50
10.	"Chemical Wedding"	Bruce Dickinson, Roy Z	The Chemical Wedding	4:05
11.	"Back from the Edge"	Bruce Dickinson, Alex Dickson	Skunkworks	4:16
12.	"Road to Hell"	Bruce Dickinson, Adrian Smith	Accident of Birth	3:58
13.	"Book of Thel" (live)	Bruce Dickinson, Roy Z, Eddie Casillas	Scream for Me Brazil	8:27

Disc two
No.	Title	Writer(s)	Length
1.	"Bring Your Daughter... to the Slaughter" (original soundtrack version)	Bruce Dickinson	5:00
2.	"Darkness Be My Friend" (b-side of All The Young Dudes 7")	Bruce Dickinson	2:00
3.	"Wicker Man" (outtake of Accident of Birth sessions, 1997 (previously unreleased)	Bruce Dickinson, Roy Z	4:40
4.	"Real World" (b-side of Killing Floor CD single)	Bruce Dickinson, Roy Z	3:55
5.	"Acoustic Song" (outtake of The Chemical Wedding sessions, 1998 (previously unreleased)	Bruce Dickinson, Roy Z	4:23
6.	"No Way Out... Continued" (b-side of Shoot All The Clowns CD single part 2)	Bruce Dickinson, Jim Crichton, R. Baker	5:18
7.	"Midnight Jam" (outtake of Accident of Birth sessions, 1997 (previously unreleased)	Bruce Dickinson, Adrian Smith, Roy Z	5:11
8.	"Man of Sorrows" (demo from Tattooed Millionaire sessions, 1990 (previously unreleased)	Bruce Dickinson	5:15
9.	"Ballad of Mutt" (b-side of Tattooed Millionaire 7")	Bruce Dickinson, Janick Gers	3:33
10.	"Re-Entry" (b-side of Back from the Edge CD single part 2)	Bruce Dickinson, Alex Dickson	4:03
11.	"I'm in a Band With an Italian Drummer" (b-side of Back from the Edge 7")	Chris Dale	3:52
12.	"Jerusalem" (live, outtake of Scream For Me Brazil (previously unreleased)	Bruce Dickinson, Roy Z, William Blake	6:43
13.	"The Voice of Crube" (spoken word commentary by Dickinson)		13:45
14.	"Dracula" (Shots recording sessions, 1977 (previously unreleased))	Doug Siviter, Phil Siviter	3:45

== Personnel ==
- Bruce Dickinson – vocals
- Roy Z – guitar, piano, mellotron
- Adrian Smith – guitar
- Janick Gers – guitar
- Eddie "Cheddar" Casillas – bass
- Alex Dickson – guitar
- Andy Carr – bass
- Chris Dale – bass
- Doug Vanbooven – percussion
- Fabio Del Rio – drums
- Alessandro Elena – drums
- Dickie Fliszar – drums
- Dave Ingraham – drums
- Alan Siviter – drums (on "Dracula")
- Doug Siviter – bass (on "Dracula")
- Baz Eardley – guitar (on "Dracula")

== Production ==
- Producers: Jack Endino, Shay Baby, Roy Z
- Engineers: Jack Endino, Spencer May
- Mixing: Spencer May, Shay Baby

== Charts ==
Chart (2001)	Peak position
Finnish Albums (Suomen virallinen lista)	6
German Albums (Offizielle Top 100)	72
Swedish Albums (Sverigetopplistan)	42
UK Independent Albums (Official Charts)	27
UK Rock & Metal Albums (Official Charts)	13
