= Scream for Me Brazil =

Live album by Bruce Dickinson
- Released: 2 November 1999
- Recorded: 25 April 1999
- Venue: Via Funchal, São Paulo, Brazil
- Genre: Heavy metal, hard rock
- Length: 69:27
- Label: Air Raid (UK); Sanctuary (US); Victor (Japan)
- Producer: Roy Z

Bruce Dickinson chronology
The Chemical Wedding (1998)	Scream for Me Brazil (1999)	The Best of Bruce Dickinson (2001)

Professional ratings
Review scores
Source	Rating
AllMusic	3/5 stars
Collector's Guide to Heavy Metal	8/10

Scream for Me Brazil is a live album by Bruce Dickinson, recorded in São Paulo, Brazil and released in 1999. The actual concert set list consisted of eighteen songs, but six of them were cut out from this release. The songs in question were three Iron Maiden songs; "Powerslave", "2 Minutes to Midnight" and "Flight of Icarus" as well as three of Dickinson's own songs; "Jerusalem", "Taking the Queen" and "Tattooed Millionaire". "Jerusalem" from this concert was later released on The Best of Bruce Dickinson compilation album in 2001. A video recording from the concert was included on the 2006 DVD Anthology.

== Background ==
The album was released when Dickinson and guitarist Adrian Smith had confirmed their return to Iron Maiden and is considered a valuable conclusion to Dickinson's solo career. The first part of the concert consists entirely of songs from the album The Chemical Wedding before the inevitable "Tears of the Dragon" heralds a return to some older Dickinson classics. The album does not include songs from Skunkworks and Tattooed Millionaire.

== Track listing ==
All songs written by Bruce Dickinson and Roy Z, except where noted.

No.	Title	Writer(s)	Original Album	Length
1.	"Trumpets of Jericho"		The Chemical Wedding, 1998	6:25
2.	"King in Crimson"		The Chemical Wedding	4:56
3.	"Chemical Wedding"		The Chemical Wedding	4:33
4.	"Gates of Urizen"		The Chemical Wedding	4:20
5.	"Killing Floor"	Dickinson, Adrian Smith	The Chemical Wedding	4:11
6.	"Book of Thel"	Dickinson, Z, Eddie Casillas	The Chemical Wedding	8:26
7.	"Tears of the Dragon"	Dickinson	Balls to Picasso, 1994	8:06
8.	"Laughing in the Hiding Bush"	Dickinson, Z, Austin Dickinson	Balls to Picasso	4:01
9.	"Accident of Birth"		Accident of Birth, 1997	4:18
10.	"The Tower"		The Chemical Wedding	7:41
11.	"Darkside of Aquarius"		Accident of Birth	7:32
12.	"Road to Hell"	Dickinson, Smith	Accident of Birth	4:58

== Personnel ==
Band members

- Bruce Dickinson - vocals
- Adrian Smith - guitar
- Roy Z - guitar, producer, engineer
- Eddie Casillas - bass
- David Ingraham - drums

Production

- Stan Katayama - engineer

== Charts ==
Chart (1999)	Peak position
UK Independent Albums (OCC)	23
UK Rock & Metal Albums (OCC)	4
