= Tribe of Gypsies =

American rock band

- Origin: Pacoima, California, U.S.
- Genres: Latin rock, hard rock
- Years active: 1991–present
- Labels: JVC/Victor; Air Raid; Mercury/PolyGram; Dream Circle
- Members: Roy Z Elvis Balladares; Matt Amper; Adam Ponce
- Past members: Phil Diamond; Chas West; Ray Rodriguez; Christian Byrne; Dave Moreno; Juan Perez; Gregg Analla; David Ingraham; Eddie Casillas; Mario Aguilar; Doug van Booven; Dean Ortega; David Young
- Website: tribeofgypsies.com

Tribe of Gypsies is a San Fernando Valley-based Latin rock group. The lead guitarist Roy Z who has produced, written for, and played with such well-known artists as English heavy metal Judas Priest, heavy metal singer Rob Halford, Brazilian heavy metal band Sepultura and English heavy metal singer Bruce Dickinson who has used various members of Tribe of Gypsies to record his solo albums starting with 1994's Balls to Picasso.

== History ==
Tribe of Gypsies was founded in 1991 by guitarist Roy Z after the breakup of his band Driver (not to be confused with heavy metal band Drive), then situated in the New England area. Upon returning to his hometown of Los Angeles, Z decided to pursue a musical direction closer to his Latin roots and recorded a 5-song demo with the help of vocalist Robbyn Garcia and bassist Kelly Pattrik. The tape found its way into the hands of Ole Bergfleth, owner of the upstart Dream Circle label in Germany. He quickly signed the band and Z began to assemble a line-up to write and record the first Tribe of Gypsies album. He would recruit bassist Eddie Casillas, whom he had played with in Gypsy Moreno, percussionists Doug van Booven and Mario Aguilar, drummer David Ingraham, and singer/flutist David Young after former Neverland vocalist Dean Ortega had declined an offer to join the group. Keyboards on the album would be supplied by Richard Baker (ex-Santana), Greg Shultz (ex-Driver), and Michael Baum, a one-time member of Swiss extreme metal pioneers Hellhammer. During the early stages of mixing the album with Shay Baby at producer Keith Olsen's Goodnight LA Studios, the band parted ways with Young and replaced him with the aforementioned Ortega who accepted a second offer to join and would re-record all vocals. While Shay Baby was mixing the Tribe's album by night, he was also working as an engineer with Iron Maiden vocalist Bruce Dickinson by day who was in town working on a follow-up to Tattooed Millionaire. By chance Dickinson heard some of the Tribe mixes and was blown away by what he heard and took the band to Iron Maiden's managers, Rod Smallwood and Andy Taylor, who signed them to their Sanctuary roster. A deal was devised to buy out the album from Dream Circle and a worldwide deal was struck with Mercury/PolyGram.

Meanwhile, Dickinson would completely scrap his album and write a new batch of songs with Roy Z and utilize most of the Tribe members as his backing band for what would become Balls to Picasso. While recording with Dickinson in London in 1993, Tribe also played a one-off show at the Borderline club; footage from the gig would be used for a promotional video for the song "We All Bleed Red". However, the Tribe's eponymous debut album would fall into limbo at Mercury when a regime change swept the band's A&R man out the door and they became de facto orphaned at the label. Eventually Mercury would renounce their rights to the album and Tribe of Gypsies was finally released in 1996 by JVC/Victor, albeit only in Japan. In 1997, Tribe toured Japan for the first time opening up for Bruce Dickinson who was promoting his Accident of Birth album which again featured Tribe members Roy Z, Eddie Casillas, and David Ingraham. All three would pull double duty on tour playing with both Tribe and Dickinson. The Japan trip, which coincided with the release of the Nothing Lasts Forever mini-album, would also constitute the last shows with vocalist Dean Ortega. Z, Casillas and Ingraham also joined Dickinson on a U.S. club tour and a European tour as support to Southern rockers Lynyrd Skynyrd.

Back in Los Angeles, Tribe began writing and recording their next album, Revolucion 13, without a new vocalist in place. Eventually, the band tracked down New Mexico native Gregg Analla, former frontman for Shrapnel recording artists 9.0 and progressive metal band Seventhsign, who agreed to a tryout and became the new vocalist. Revolucion 13, the first Tribe album to feature percussionist Elvis Balladares and keyboardist Ray Rodriguez, was another Japan only release and not supported by any touring activities aside from a pair of acoustic performances by Z and Analla during a promotional trip to Japan. Instead Z, Casillas and Ingraham would again hit the road with Dickinson for a South American run of dates in support of his 1998 album, The Chemical Wedding, documented via the Scream for Me Brazil live album in 1999 and subsequent DVD, included with the 3-disc video Anthology in 2006; close band friend Richard "The Guru" Carrette would stand in for Z on the European leg of The Chemical Wedding tour.

1999 saw the Tribe commence work on their third full-length release under the guidance of legendary duo, Richie Podolor and Bill Cooper, with bassist Juan Perez, formerly of Civil Defiance, replacing Casillas and recording the final 3 songs for the album; percussionist Mario Aguilar would also exit the fold. Standing on the Shoulders of Giants was issued on January 1, 2000, in Japan, making it the first album to be released in the new millennium. Bruce Dickinson's Air Raid label would pick up the album in Europe where it was re-titled Tribe of Gypsies III in order to avoid confusion with Oasis' Standing on the Shoulder of Giants. In the fall of 2000, Tribe was invited to join Santana for a partial leg of their Supernatural U.S. tour, playing shows in Houston, Gregg Analla's hometown of Albuquerque, Phoenix, Los Angeles, Sacramento and San Francisco. Danilo Torres would fill in on drums for David Ingraham due to the latter's commitments with The Young Dubliners.

Hoping to capitalize on their momentum, Tribe soon began work on their fourth studio album with Podolor and Cooper at American Recordings. After laying down a batch of new tracks sessions stalled and eventually Analla moved back to New Mexico, burnt out from living in L.A. and in need of a break. Ingraham, too, would leave and join The Young Dubliners full-time. With Tribe temporarily sidelined, Z re-teamed with Bruce Dickinson for 2005's Tyranny of Souls, which also featured new Tribe drummer Dave Moreno and bassist Juan Perez. A Tribe line-up consisting of Z, Rodriguez, Balladares, Moreno and long-time band affiliate Christian Byrne stepping in for Perez on bass began writing and rehearsing new songs in 2004 while at the same time jamming with different singers, including Terry Ilous (XYZ) and Keith St John (Montrose, Burning Rain). Tribe wound find their man in Moreno's friend Chas West who had recently moved back from England after fronting the Jason Bonham Band. With West on board, Tribe commenced work with Podolor and Cooper and released Dweller on the Threshold in the summer of 2006 in Japan, followed by a pair of high-profile Japanese gigs under the UDO Music Festival banner in Osaka and Fuji Speedway, respectively, sharing a bill with Kiss, Paul Rodgers, Alice In Chains, Steve Vai and others.

In the summer of 2010, original Tribe congalero Doug van Booven passed away; the band would not be heard from again until 2014 when they were invited to play Germany's Rock of Ages festival, their first ever show on the European mainland. The line-up now consisted of Z, Balladares, original bassist Eddie Casillas, keyboardist Matt Amper, drummer Adam Ponce and Greek vocalist Phil Diamond. Closer to home, Tribe opened up for Latin American all-stars De La Tierra at The Fonda Theatre in Hollywood, CA.

In early 2016, Tribe released a video for the song "Yeah!", recorded with long-time friends and producers, Richie Podolor and Bill Cooper, but soon found themselves without the services of Diamond, further stalling the release of a new album.

On January 4, 2018, former vocalist Gregg Analla died from injuries sustained in a motorcycle accident in Albuquerque, New Mexico. At the time of his death, Analla was tentatively back in the Tribe fold as plans were made for a run of shows later in the year.

== Discography ==
=== Albums ===
- Tribe of Gypsies (JVC/Victor, 1996)
- Nothing Lasts Forever EP (JVC/Victor, 1997)
- Revolucion 13 (JVC/Victor, 1998)
- Standing on the Shoulders of Giants (JVC/Victor, 2000) aka Tribe Of Gypsies III (Air Raid, 2000)
- Dweller on the Threshold (JVC/Victor, 2006)

=== Compilations ===
- Rattlesnake Guitar – The Music of Peter Green (Viceroy, 1995)
- The Spirit of the Black Rose – A Tribute to Philip Parris Lynott (Record Heaven, 2001)
