= Ancient Future (album) =

Studio album by Warrior
- Released: 1998
- Genre: Heavy metal
- Length: 44:45
- Label: Dream Circle
- Producer: Warrior

Warrior chronology
Fighting for the Earth (1985)	Ancient Future (1998)	The Code of Life (2001)

Professional ratings
Review scores
Source	Rating
AllMusic	3/5 stars

Ancient Future is the second album by American heavy metal band Warrior. It was released 13 years after their debut album Fighting for the Earth.

== Track listing ==
1. "Fight or Fall" – 4:16
2. "Pray" – 4:12
3. "Who Sane?" – 4:20
4. "Learn to Love" – 4:58
5. "Tonight We Ride" – 5:18
6. "Power" – 4:32
7. "White Mansions" – 4:42
8. "The Rush" – 5:14
9. "Tear It Down" – 3:29
10. "Ancient Future" – 3:44

== Personnel ==
- Parramore McCarty – vocals
- Joe Floyd – guitars, bass on tracks 4, 5, 6, 9
- Mick Perez – guitars, keyboards
- Sam – bass
- Dave DuCey – drums
- Roy Z – guitars, bass on tracks 1, 2, 3, 8
- Eddie Casillas – bass on track 10
- Jorge Palacios – additional drums
