= Dive! Dive! Live! =

Video by Bruce Dickinson
- Released: 1991
- Recorded: 14 August 1990
- Genre: Heavy metal, hard rock
- Length: 94 min
- Label: Picture Music International

Bruce Dickinson chronology
Dive! Dive! Live! (1991)	Skunkworks Live Video (1997)

Dive! Dive! Live! is the first live video recorded by heavy metal singer Bruce Dickinson. It was filmed at Wolf & Rissmiller's Country Club on Sherman Way, Reseda, California, on 14 August 1990, while finishing the Tattooed Millionaire US tour leg. The video was produced by Paul Flattery and directed by Jim Yukich—who also worked on Iron Maiden's Live After Death—and the backing band was the same as on "Tattooed Millionaire", save drummer Dickie Fliszar, who replaced Fabio del Rio to perform during the tour. The set-list consisted practically of all the songs from the Tattooed Millionaire sessions, except for "Darkness Be My Friend" from "All The Young Dudes" single. It included "Bring Your Daughter... to the Slaughter" and some cover versions played throughout the tour, like Deep Purple's "Black Night" and AC/DC's "Sin City". "Riding with the Angels" is a song composed while Dickinson was a member of Samson.

The video was included on Dickinson's 2006 DVD Anthology. In an interview on the DVD, Dickinson revealed that he was not happy with the production of the video. A camera rig rail needed to be laid half-way through the crowd in order to film the performance on stage. Dickinson was also displeased by a lack of an opening act, the fact that a make up artist was hired and that the crowd was not allowed to be served beer. Dickinson was so displeased with the final product that he tossed the film in a ditch after the show, although it was undamaged and salvaged.

== Track listing ==
All songs written by Bruce Dickinson and Janick Gers, except where noted.

1. "Riding with the Angels" (Russ Ballard)
2. "Born in '58"
3. "Lickin' the Gun"
4. "Gypsy Road"
5. "Dive! Dive! Dive!"
6. "Zulu Lulu/Ballad of Mutt"
7. "Son of a Gun"
8. "Hell on Wheels"
9. "All the Young Dudes" (David Bowie)
10. "Tattooed Millionaire"
11. "No Lies"
12. "Fog on the Tyne/Winds of Change"
13. "Sin City" (Bon Scott, Angus Young, Malcolm Young)
14. "Bring Your Daughter... to the Slaughter" (Dickinson)
15. "Black Night" (Ritchie Blackmore, Ian Gillan, Roger Glover, Jon Lord, Ian Paice)

== Personnel ==
=== Band ===
- Bruce Dickinson – vocals, tambourines, drums
- Janick Gers – guitars
- Andy Carr – bass, backing vocals
- Dickie Fliszar – drums, backing vocals

=== Production ===
- Jim Yukich - director
- Paul Flattery - producer
- Doug Hall - live sound
- Chris Tsangarides - mixing
