= Alive in Studio A =

Live album by Bruce Dickinson
- Released: February 1995
- Recorded: 18 October 1994 (disc 2)
- Venue: Marquee Club, London (disc 2)
- Studio: Metropolis, London (disc 1)
- Genre: Hard rock, heavy metal
- Length: 58:44 (disc 1); 62:23 (disc 2)
- Label: Raw Power/Castle (Europe); CMC International (US); Victor (Japan)

Bruce Dickinson chronology
| Balls to Picasso (1994) | Alive in Studio A (1995) | Skunkworks (1996) |

Professional ratings
Review scores
| Source | Rating |
|---|---|
| AllMusic | 2/5 stars |
| Collector's Guide to Heavy Metal | 7/10 |
| Rock Hard | 8.0/10 |

Alive in Studio A is a heavy metal album released by Iron Maiden frontman Bruce Dickinson in 1995.

The album does not include new songs but instead re-recordings of songs from Bruce's first two solo-albums Tattooed Millionaire and Balls to Picasso with his new band line-up. This line-up would record the next album, Skunkworks. The first CD was recorded live at Metropolis Studios, London, while the second CD is composed of live-recordings at the Marquee Club with his new band.

The idea was for a low-key release of these double albums, and, according to the booklet in the 2005 re-release, Bruce Dickinson was less than pleased when the record company tried to pass them off as new material. Alive In Studio A was originally meant as a live session to be played on a US radio station, however, this never took place.

== Track listings ==
Disc one – Alive in Studio A

1. "Cyclops" – 7:15
2. "Shoot All the Clowns" – 4:55
3. "Son of a Gun" – 5:44
4. "Tears of the Dragon" – 6:27
5. "1000 Points of Light" – 3:53
6. "Sacred Cowboys" – 3:56
7. "Tattooed Millionaire" – 3:55
8. "Born in '58" – 3:23
9. "Fire" – 4:57
10. "Change of Heart" – 4:39
11. "Hell No" – 5:11
12. "Laughing in the Hiding Bush" – 4:08

Disc two – Alive at the Marquee

1. "Cyclops" – 7:54
2. "1000 Points of Light" – 4:02
3. "Born in '58" – 3:15
4. "Gods of War" – 5:10
5. "Change of Heart" – 4:29
6. "Laughing in the Hiding Bush" – 3:51
7. "Hell No" – 6:02
8. "Tears of the Dragon" – 6:19
9. "Shoot All the Clowns" – 5:06
10. "Sacred Cowboys" – 4:17
11. "Son of a Gun" – 5:41
12. "Tattooed Millionaire" – 6:17

== Personnel ==
Musicians

- Bruce Dickinson – vocals
- Alex Dickson – guitar
- Chris Dale – bass
- Alessandro Elena – drums

Production

- Spencer May – engineer, mixing
- Tim Summerhayes – Fleetwood Mobile engineer

== Charts ==
| Chart (1995) | Peak position |
|---|---|
| UK Albums (OCC) | 96 |
| UK Rock & Metal Albums (OCC) | 6 |
