= Skunkworks Live =

Skunkworks Live may refer to two works released by heavy metal singer Bruce Dickinson:

- Skunkworks Live EP
- Skunkworks Live Video
