= Dweller on the Threshold (album) =

Studio album by Tribe of Gypsies
- Released: 2006
- Recorded: 2000–2006
- Genre: Latin rock, hard rock
- Label: JVC/Victor Entertainment, Seoul Records

Tribe of Gypsies chronology
Standing on the Shoulders of Giants (2000)	Dweller on the Threshold (2006)

Dweller on the Threshold is the fourth full-length album by San Fernando Valley, California-based Latin rock band Tribe of Gypsies. It was written and recorded off and on between late 2000 and early 2006 with different personnel. The first sessions took place mere weeks after getting off the road in the U.S. with Santana; the last song to be completed was "Stop Bombing Each Other!" in early spring of 2006.

It marks the debut of new lead vocalist Chas West (ex-Jason Bonham Band) and guitarist Christian Byrne, who contributed bass on the album in addition to regular four-stringer, Juan Perez. Roy Z makes his lead vocal debut on "La Hora" and the Japanese bonus track, "En El Mar", both sung in Spanish.

The album contains a cover of "Ain't Talkin' 'Bout Love", originally released on the eponymous 1978 debut album by Van Halen.

== Track listing ==
1. "Big Sky Presence"
2. "Ride On"
3. "Desolate Chile"
4. "Stop Bombing Each Other!"
5. "Halos"
6. "Zoot Suit Mardi Gras"
7. "Go Your Way"
8. "After the Summer"
9. "Flying Tigers, Crying Dragons"
10. "Ain't Talkin' 'Bout Love"
11. "Never Will Be Mine"
12. "La Hora"
13. "Hands to Eternity"
14. "En El Mar" (bonus track)

== Personnel ==
Musicians

- Roy Z – guitars, vocals
- Chas West – vocals
- Ray Rodriguez – keyboards
- Elvis Balladares – percussion
- David Moreno – drums
- Christian Byrne – guitar, bass
- Juan Perez – bass

Guest Musicians

- Gregg Analla – additional vocals & acoustic guitar on "Go Your Way"
- David Ingraham – drums on "Desolate Chile", "Zoot Suit Mardi Gras" & "Go Your Way"
- Penny Wanzo – additional vocals on "Stop Bombing Each Other!" & "Halos"
- Tetsuya ‘Tex’ Nakamura – harmonica on "Zoot Suit Mardi Gras"
- Nicol Mecerova – vocals on "Zoot Suit Mardi Gras"
- Sal Rodriguez – timbales on "Ain't Talkin' 'Bout Love"
- Mistheria – additional keyboards & orchestration on "Stop Bombing Each Other!"
- Richard Podolor – mandolin on "Halos"; additional guitar on "Desolate Chile" & "La Hora"

Production Credits

- Produced by Richard Podolor & Roy Z
- Co-produced by Bill Cooper and Tribe of Gypsies
- Engineered and Recorded by Bill Cooper at American Recording Company, Calabasas, CA; Roy Z at Mountain View Studios, Sylmar, CA; and Doom Room Studios, San Fernando, CA
- Mixed by Richard Podolor and Bill Cooper at American Recording Company, Calabasas, CA; "Flying Tigers, Crying Dragons" and "En El Mar" mixed by Roy Z at Mountain View Studios, Sylmar, CA
- Mastered by Andy Horn at Famous Kitchen, Adelsheim, Germany

== Sources ==
- TribeOfGypsies.com discography
