= Fighting for the Earth =

Studio album by Warrior
- Released: March 12, 1985
- Studios: Cherokee Studios, Sunset Sound Recorders, Sound City Studios, Los Angeles, California
- Genre: Heavy metal
- Length: 37:26
- Labels: 10 Records, Metal Blade, Toshiba-EMI, NL Distribution
- Producers: Warrior and Doug Rider

Warrior chronology
| Fighting for the Earth (1985) | Ancient Future (1998) |

Fighting for the Earth is the debut album by American heavy metal band Warrior. It was originally released in March 12, 1985 and was re-issued by Metal Blade in 1991 (North America), Toshiba-EMI in 1993 (Japan) as part of the Burrn! Legendary Masters series, and by NL Distribution in 2008 (Europe).

== Critical reception ==
Professional ratings
Review scores
| Source | Rating |
|---|---|
| AllMusic | 3/5 stars |
| Kerrang! | 4/5 stars |

Fighting for the Earth was ranked number 275 in Rock Hard magazine's book of The 500 Greatest Rock & Metal Albums of All Time in 2005.

== Track listing ==
All songs written and composed by Joe Floyd, except where noted:

| No. | Title | Length |
|---|---|---|
| 1. | "Fighting for the Earth" | 5:23 |
| 2. | "Only the Strong Survive" | 4:47 |
| 3. | "Ruler" (Floyd, Bennett) | 3:29 |
| 4. | "Mind Over Matter" (Floyd, Bennett) | 3:47 |
| 5. | "Defenders of Creation" | 5:51 |
| 6. | "Day of the Evil... (Beware)" | 3:53 |
| 7. | "Cold Fire" | 5:04 |
| 8. | "PTM 1" (McCarty) | 0:35 |
| 9. | "Welcome Aboard" (Floyd, McCarty) | 4:37 |

== Personnel ==
Band members

- Parramore McCarty – vocals
- Joe El-Khadem (aka Floyd} – guitars
- Rick Bennett- bass
- Tommy Asakawa – guitar
- Jimmy Volpe - drums (credited, but does not play)

Additional musicians

- Rick Bennett – bass, keyboards on all tracks
- Liam Jason – drums on all tracks

Production

- Doug Rider – producer, engineer
- David Thoener – mixing
- Brian Scheuble, Peggy McCreary, Ray Leonard – assistant engineers
- Bob Ludwig – mastering at Masterdisk, New York
