= Nothing Lasts Forever (Tribe of Gypsies EP) =

EP by Tribe of Gypsies
- Released: 1997
- Recorded: 1993–1996
- Genres: Latin rock, Hard rock
- Label: JVC/Victor Entertainment

Tribe of Gypsies chronology
Tribe of Gypsies (1996)	Nothing Lasts Forever (1997)	Revolucion 13 (1998)

Nothing Lasts Forever is a 6-song mini-album by San Fernando Valley, California-based Latin Rock band Tribe of Gypsies. It is the second and final release with Dean Ortega (ex-Neverland) on lead vocals.

After releasing their debut album Tribe Of Gypsies the previous year, JVC/Victor Entertainment was eager to issue a new product in anticipation of the band's 1997 tour of Japan with former Iron Maiden vocalist Bruce Dickinson who also used ToG members Roy Z, Eddie Casillas, and David Ingraham as backing musicians in his solo band. As a result, the band came up with this mini-album consisting of 4 original songs and covers of "I'm a Man", written by Steve Winwood and Jimmy Miller for the Spencer Davis Group's 1967 album of the same name, and "Oh Well", written by Peter Green and first released on Fleetwood Mac's 1969 album Then Play On.

Roy Z and percussionist Doug Van Booven also cut a vastly different arrangement of Oh Well with former David Lee Roth rhythm section, bassist Billy Sheehan and drummer Greg Bissonette, and keyboardist Tommy Mandel for the Rattlesnake Guitar - The Music of Peter Green tribute album, released on Viceroy Records in 1995.

Musical guests on Nothing Lasts Forever include Downset vocalist Rey Oropeza, former Santana member Richard Baker, and keyboardist Greg Shultz (Driver, Joshua).

== Track listing ==
1. "Nothing Lasts Forever" – 4:29
2. "Gangland" – 4:24
3. "Turn Around" – 4:31
4. "I'm a Man" – 3:29
5. "Melena" – 3:57
6. "Oh Well" – 3:51

== Personnel ==
Musicians

- Roy Z – guitar, background vocals & percussion
- Dean Ortega – lead vocals, acoustic guitars & percussion
- Edward Casillas – bass guitar, vocals & percussion
- Elvis Balladares – timbales & percussion
- David Ingraham – drums & percussion

Guest Musicians

- Doug Van Booven – congas, percussion & vocals
- Richard Baker & Greg Shultz – keyboards
- Rey Oropeza – rap on Gangland
- Mario Quiroga & Linda Bahia – vocals on Melena

Production Credits Produced by Roy Z
Co-produced by Shay Baby & Tribe of Gypsies
Engineered by Joe Floyd, Shay Baby, Bill Cooper
Mixed by Joe Floyd & Roy Z
Recorded at Silver Cloud, Burbank, CA & American Recording, Woodland Hills, CA

== Sources ==
- TribeOfGypsies.com discography
