= The Wars of Gods and Men =

Studio album by Warrior
- Released: 2004
- Genre: Heavy metal
- Length: 40:31
- Label: Reality Entertainment
- Producer: Warrior

Warrior chronology
The Code of Life (2001)	The Wars of Gods and Men (2004)

The Wars of Gods and Men is the fourth album by American heavy metal band Warrior. It is the first and only album to feature vocalist Marc Storace of Krokus.

It was rated a six out of ten by Metal.de.

== Track listing ==
1. "The Wars of Gods and Men" – 04:54
2. "Do It Now" – 03:14
3. "Never Live Your Life Again" – 03:50
4. "Salvation" – 04:00
5. "3 Am Eternal" – 03:27
6. "Mars" – 04:02
7. "Unseen Forces" – 03:54
8. "Hypocrite" – 03:59
9. "Naked Aggression" – 04:41
10. "Love Above All" – 04:30

== Personnel ==
- Marc Storace – vocals
- Joe Floyd – guitars
- Rob Farr – bass
- Dave DuCey – drums
- Jason Miller – additional lead guitars
