= Standing on the Shoulders of Giants (Tribe of Gypsies album) =

Studio album by Tribe of Gypsies
- Released: June 19, 2000
- Recorded: 1999
- Genre: Latin rock, hard rock
- Label: JVC/Victor Entertainment; Seoul Records; Air Raid Records

Tribe of Gypsies chronology
Revolucion 13 (1998)	Standing on the Shoulders of Giants (2000)	Dweller on the Threshold (2006)

Standing on the Shoulders of Giants is the third full-length album by San Fernando Valley, California-based Latin rock band Tribe of Gypsies. It marks the swan song for percussionist Mario Aguilar and bassist Eddie Casillas, who was replaced by Juan Perez (ex-Civil Defiance) for the final three songs the band recorded for the album.

The title refers to a saying first attributed to Bernard of Chartres. It was most famously used by the 17th-century scientist Isaac Newton and is also inscribed on the edge of the British £2 coin. The album was re-titled Tribe of Gypsies III for the European market and released by Bruce Dickinson's Air Raid label.

The album contains a cover of "Parisienne Walkways" (dedicated to Philomena Lynott in the liner notes), co-written by Phil Lynott and Gary Moore for Moore's 1979 Back On The Streets album. The track also appears on The Spirit of the Black Rose - A Tribute to Philip Parris Lynott, released by Swedish label Record Heaven in 2001. Another song, "Over All", written with Downset's Rey Oropeza, is uncredited and plays at roughly the ten-minute mark of "Parisienne Walkways".

"The Flower" was co-written by Roy Z and Bruce Dickinson of Iron Maiden.

Sian Llewellyn of Classic Rock magazine called the album "a summer stunner".

== Track listing ==
1. "The Flower"
2. "Rays of the Sun"
3. "Admit It"
4. "It Don't Bother Me"
5. "Puro Party"
6. "What Cha Want"
7. "Angel"
8. "Up"
9. "Better Days"
10. "Dreams"
11. "Puro Party (Reprise)"
12. "Parisienne Walkways" [bonus track]
13. "Over All" [uncredited bonus track]

== Personnel ==
Musicians

- Roy Z – guitar, vocals and percussion
- Gregg Analla – vocals
- David Ingraham – drums and percussion
- Elvis Balladares – percussion
- Juan Perez – bass

Contributions

- Mario Aguilar – additional percussion
- Eddie Casillas – bass on "Better Days", "Puro Party", "What Cha Want", "Up" and "Parisienne Walkways"
- Juan Perez – bass on "Rays Of The Sun", "Admit It" and "It Don't Bother Me"
- Roy Z – bass on "The Flower", "Angel" and "Dreams"

Production credits
All tracks produced, mixed and engineered by Roy Z and Joe Floyd
except tracks 2, 3 and 4, produced by Richard Polodor, mixed by Richard Polodor and Bill Cooper, and engineered by Bill Cooper
Recorded at Silver Cloud (Burbank, California) American (Woodland Hills, California) and Rumba House (Sylmar, California)

== Sources ==
- TribeOfGypsies.com discography
