= Revolucion 13 =

Studio album by Tribe of Gypsies
- Released: 1998
- Recorded: 1997–1998
- Genres: Latin rock, Hard rock
- Labels: JVC/Victor Entertainment, Seoul Records

Tribe of Gypsies chronology
Nothing Lasts Forever (1997)	Revolucion 13 (1998)	Standing on the Shoulders of Giants (2000)

Revolucion 13 is the second full-length album by Tribe of Gypsies, a Latin rock band based in the San Fernando Valley, California, USA. It is the first recording with the Native American singer Gregg Analla (ex-Seventh Sign, 9.0) on lead vocals.

After the vocalist Dean Ortega left to front his own project, Revolution Child, the remaining members of Tribe Of Gypsies wrote, rehearsed and recorded all of the music for their new album instrumentally, cutting tracks live in the studio with the full band. Months later they were put in touch with the singer Gregg Analla in New Mexico whose band, Seventh Sign, had just broken up. Analla went to Los Angeles after he was sent some tracks to work on at home and recorded his vocals at Warrior guitarist Joe Floyd's studio, completing the album.

Musical guests on Revolucion 13 include performers from the Nothing Lasts Forever mini-album, the Downset vocalist Rey Oropeza and keyboard players Greg Shultz (Driver, Joshua), as well as Ray Rodriguez who became the band's full-time keyboard player.

== Track listing ==
1. "Aztlan" – 2:15
2. "What's Up?" – 4:20
3. "Summer Rain" – 6:02
4. "Revolucion 13" – 8:38
5. "Landslide" – 5:39
6. "Spanish Blue" – 7:01
7. "Collapse" – 4:54
8. "Mother's Cry" – 8:05
9. "Aztlan (Reprise)" – 3:50
10. "Pancho Villa Part 1" – 4:19
11. "Freedom" – 7:51

== Personnel ==
Musicians

- Roy Z – guitar, vocals, percussion
- Gregg Analla – vocals
- Edward Casillas – bass guitar, vocals, percussion
- Elvis Balladares – percussion
- Mario Aguilar – timbales, percussion
- David Ingraham – drums, percussion

Guest musicians

- Rey Oropeza – vocals on "What's Up"
- Victor Baez – Bata on "Revolucion 13", vocals and conga on "Pancho Villa"
- Mario Q – vocals on "Freedom"
- Al Martin – flute, vocals
- Ray Rodriguez – B3, Rhodes on "Aztlan", "What's Up" and "Spanish Blue"
- David Torres – piano on "Aztlan Reprise"
- Greg Schultz – B3, mellotron, piano, ARP on "Summer Rain", "Revolucion 13", "Landslide", "Collapse" and "Mother's Cry"

Production credits

- Produced by Roy Z
- Co-produced by Joe Floyd & Tribe Of Gypsies
- Engineered and mixed by Joe Floyd & Roy Z
- Assistant engineer: Rich 'The Guru' Carrette
- Recorded and mixed at Silver Cloud, Burbank, CA
- Vocal pre-production at Sound Chaser Studios, Albuquerque, NM
- Mastered by Dave Collins at A&M Mastering
- Drum tech: Matt Loneau
- Drum rentals: Jorge Palacios
- Guitar tech: The Guru

== Sources ==
- TribeOfGypsies.com discography
