= Tribe of Gypsies (album) =

Studio album by Tribe of Gypsies
- Released: 1996
- Recorded: 1993
- Genre: Latin rock, hard rock
- Label: JVC/Victor Entertainment

Tribe of Gypsies chronology
| Tribe of Gypsies (1996) | Nothing Lasts Forever (1997) |

Tribe of Gypsies is the debut album by San Fernando Valley, California-based Latin rock band Tribe of Gypsies.

It was initially recorded for German indie label Dream Circle Records, then bought out by major Mercury Records after the band landed a management deal with Sanctuary's Rod Smallwood after being introduced by Iron Maiden vocalist Bruce Dickinson. Eventually, the band got dropped by Mercury after a regime change at the company without the album ever seeing the light of day before a licensing deal was struck with Japan's JVC/Victor Entertainment who finally released Tribe Of Gypsies in 1996.

Notable guest musicians on the album include legendary harmonica player Lee Oskar of War fame, current War drummer Sal Rodriguez, former Santana keyboardist Richard Baker, future Queensrÿche guitarist Mike Stone, and Dee Dee Bellson, daughter of drum icon Louie Bellson.

A promotional video for the song "We All Bleed Red" was shot at the band's first and to this date only European show at the Borderline club in London, UK while the members of Tribe of Gypsies recorded the Balls To Picasso album with Bruce Dickinson in the fall of 1993.

== Track listing ==
1. "En Mi Barrio" – 3:03
2. "In the Middle" – 4:52
3. "Death Song" – 5:46
4. "Guajira" – 4:40
5. "Walking on the Water" – 5:17
6. "Mero Mero Mambo" – 2:45
7. "Party (Eddie's Thumb)" – 4:13
8. "Fire Dance" – 5:31
9. "Thinking of You" – 6:18
10. "We All Bleed Red" – 7:07
11. "Crazy Love" – 4:25
12. "I'm So Close" – 5:51
13. "Conjuring of the Soul" – 1:49

== Notes ==
Musicians

- Dean Ortega – lead vocals, acoustic guitar, percussion
- Roy Z – electric and acoustic guitars, backing vocals, percussion
- Edward Casillas – bass, backing vocals, percussion
- Mario Aguilar – timbales, percussion
- David Ingraham – drums, percussion

Guest Musicians

- Doug Van Booven – congas, backing vocals, percussion
- Dee Dee Bellson – backing vocals on Fire Dance
- Lee Oskar – harmonica on In The Middle
- Ray Rodriguez, Greg Shultz, Mike Baum, Richard Baker, John Nunn – additional keyboards
- Sal Rodriguez, Mario Quiroga, Chino Rodriguez, Linda Bahia, Mike Stone – additional background vocals

Production Credits

Produced by Roy Z
Co-produced by Shay Baby & Tribe of Gypsies
Engineered by Joe Floyd, Sean Kenesie, Shay Baby, Bill Cooper
Assistant Engineers: Matt Westfield, John Boutin, Eric Greedy
Mixed at A&M Studios, Los Angeles by Joe Barresi, assisted by Chad Bamford
Recorded at Silver Cloud, Burbank, CA; American Recording, Woodland Hills, CA; Goodnight L.A., Van Nuys, CA.

== Sources ==
- TribeOfGypsies.com discography
