= The Code of Life =

Studio album by Warrior
- Released: 2001
- Genre: Heavy metal
- Length: 52:36
- Label: Nuclear Blast
- Producer: Warrior

Warrior chronology
Ancient Future (1998)	The Code of Life (2001)	The Wars of Gods and Men (2004)

The Code of Life is the third album by American heavy metal band Warrior. It is the first and only album to feature vocalist Rob Rock.

== Track listing ==
1. "Day of Reckoning" – 04:03
2. "Kill the Machine" – 04:29
3. "Standing" – 04:47
4. "We Are One" – 06:33
5. "Open Your Eyes" – 06:13
6. "Pantheon" – 01:50
7. "The Code of Life" – 04:37
8. "Soul Survivor" – 04:02
9. "The Endless Beginning" – 05:35
10. "The Fools' Theme" – 04:41
11. "Insignificance" – 01:29
12. "Retribution" – 04:17

== Personnel ==
- Rob Rock – vocals
- Joe Floyd – guitars
- Mick Perez – guitars
- Simon Oliver – bass
- Dave DuCey – drums
- Richard Carrette – lead guitar on "The Endless Beginning"
