= Back from the Edge (song) =

Single by Bruce Dickinson

from the album Skunkworks
- B-side: "I'm in a Band with an Italian Drummer"
- Released: 1 April 1996
- Genre: Grunge; hard rock; alternative rock
- Length: 4:28
- Label: EMI
- Songwriters: Bruce Dickinson; Alex Dickson

Bruce Dickinson singles chronology
| "Shoot All the Clowns" (1994) | "Back from the Edge" (1996) | "Accident of Birth" (1997) |

"Back from the Edge" is the first and only single released to promote Bruce Dickinson's third solo studio album, Skunkworks, released on 1 April 1996. The single peaked at number 68 on the UK Singles Chart.

== Track listing ==
1. "Back from the Edge" (Bruce Dickinson/Alex Dickson) – 4:19
2. "Rescue Day" – 4:11
3. "God's Not Coming Back" – 2:19
4. "Armchair Hero" – 2:43

== "I'm in a Band with an Italian Drummer" ==
"I'm in a Band with an Italian Drummer" is an ironic/spoof rock song, first issued as the B-side of "Back from the Edge" (only on its 7-inch vinyl format), and subsequently released on the second disc of the 2001 The Best of Bruce Dickinson compilation album.

It was written by bassist Chris Dale, who was in Dickinson's short-lived backing band for the Skunkworks album, also named Skunkworks. The song's instrumentation features funny breaks with many deliberately off-beat electronic drum machine effects, each occurring immediately after the line "...and when he plays his drums it sounds like this". The lyrics, which (unusually for Dickinson) are composed of rapped verses and sung choruses, are a jocular portrait of the band's drummer Alessandro Elena, who is "really Italian"—as a line in the lyrics defines him—and feature most of the clichés commonly associated with the way Italians are perceived outside of Italy, in the Italians Do It Better style.

The song's end was spoken by the drummer in Sicilian language, more specifically in the dialect of Palermo, starting with a line in heavily inflected, "Italianized" English and then going straight into dialect. The speech features him complaining about his complete lack of understanding of what Dickinson is singing, all spiced up with "colourful" Italian and Sicilian-language expressions.

== Credits ==
- Bruce Dickinson – vocals
- Alex Dickson – guitar
- Chris Dale – bass guitar
- Alessandro Elena – drums

== Chart positions ==
| Chart (1994) | Peak position |
|---|---|
| UK Singles Chart | 68 |
