= Balls to Picasso =

Studio album by Bruce Dickinson
- Released: 6 June 1994
- Recorded: 1994
- Studios: Various: Metropolis Studios, Chiswick, London; Townhouse 3, London (drums); Westside Studios, London (bass); Siver Cloud, Los Angeles, California and Granny's, Reno, Nevada ("Shoot All the Clowns")
- Genres: Hard rock; heavy metal
- Length: 51:08
- Labels: EMI (Europe); Mercury (US)
- Producer: Shay Baby

Bruce Dickinson chronology
Tattooed Millionaire (1990)	Balls to Picasso (1994)	Alive in Studio A (1995)

Singles from Balls to Picasso
- 1. "Tears of the Dragon" Released: 16 May 1994; 2. "Shoot All the Clowns" Released: 26 September 1994

Professional ratings
Review scores
Source	Rating
AllMusic	3/5 stars
Collector's Guide to Heavy Metal	6/10
Rock Hard	9.0/10

Balls to Picasso is the second solo album by Iron Maiden vocalist Bruce Dickinson, released in 1994. It is the first album in Dickinson's solo career that was released after he had officially left Iron Maiden (although he rejoined again in 1999).

This record marked the beginning of Dickinson's collaborations with guitarist Roy Z, who would work on many of Dickinson's later albums including Accident of Birth, The Chemical Wedding and Tyranny of Souls. Stylistically it departs from Tattooed Millionaire but is still more traditional-sounding than the follow-up album Skunkworks released in 1996. Later, Dickinson said that he and Roy Z were talked into making the album less heavy than it should have been.

== Overview ==
Dickinson started working on his second solo album towards the end of 1992, while still in Iron Maiden. For the very first recording sessions he recruited the British band Skin. Not satisfied with the style of the effort, Dickinson aborted the recording.

His next attempt at a second solo album was a collaboration with American record producer Keith Olsen and members of the Canadian rock band Saga. "Over and Out", "Tibet", "Tears of the Dragon (First Bit, Long Bit, Last Bit)", "Cadillac Gas Mask", and "No Way Out...Continued" are all songs recorded with Olsen and set for inclusion on this record, also referred to by Dickinson as "The Lost Album".

In his spoken word commentary on The Best of Bruce Dickinson, the singer himself says that this unfinished album was inspired by Peter Gabriel and that the master tapes from these sessions had been lost. Other songs from these sessions that have yet to surface on any Dickinson release include "Man of Sorrows" (re-recorded for Accident of Birth; an older demo version from 1990 appears on The Best of Bruce Dickinson), "Original Sin" and "Thank Heaven".

Dickinson decided to scrap this project as well and teamed up with guitarist Roy Z and his band Tribe of Gypsies to write and record Balls to Picasso. The song "Change of Heart" was originally written and demoed by Roy Z and vocalist Rob Rock with their band Driver. Dickinson changed the lyrics for the version that was recorded for Balls to Picasso. Roy Z and Rock later recorded and released their version when Driver reunited for their 2008 debut album, Sons of Thunder.

Songs from Dickinson's previous recording sessions later resurfaced as b-sides on singles from Balls to Picasso and subsequently also as bonus tracks on the album's 2005 extended edition.

In the Anthology DVD, Dickinson said that he regrets not naming the album Laughing in the Hiding Bush after the song of the same name. The song itself is dedicated to his son, Austin, who penned the title.

Balls to Picasso was also released in DVD-Audio 5.1 mix and DualDisc (CD/DVD-Audio 5.1 mix) versions by Sanctuary Records.

== Cover artwork ==
In a 1996 interview with Tom Russell of Glasgow-based Radio Clyde 1, Bruce revealed that the album was originally to be titled Laughing in the Hiding Bush. The artwork was designed by Storm Thorgerson – but they couldn't afford it. His album's title was changed and he drew two squares on a toilet wall for the cover, and Thorgerson's artwork later ended up as the cover for the Anthrax album Stomp 442.

Thorgerson later did the artwork for Bruce's Skunkworks album.

== Track listing ==
All tracks are written by Bruce Dickinson and Roy Z, except where noted.

No.	Title	Writer(s)	Length
1.	"Cyclops"		7:58
2.	"Hell No"		5:11
3.	"Gods of War"		5:02
4.	"1000 Points of Light"		4:25
5.	"Laughing in the Hiding Bush"	B. Dickinson, Z, Austin Dickinson	4:20
6.	"Change of Heart"		4:58
7.	"Shoot All the Clowns"		4:24
8.	"Fire"	B. Dickinson, Z, Eddie Casillas	4:30
9.	"Sacred Cowboys"		3:53
10.	"Tears of the Dragon"	B. Dickinson	6:24

All tracks are written by Bruce Dickinson, except where noted.

2005 Extended Edition bonus disc
No.	Title	Writer(s)	Length
1.	"Fire Child"		6:24
2.	"Elvis Has Left the Building"		3:23
3.	"The Breeding House"		5:18
4.	"No Way Out...To Be Continued"		7:31
5.	"Tears of the Dragon (Acoustic Chillout)"		4:32
6.	"Winds of Change"	B. Dickinson, Janick Gers	4:14
7.	"Spirit of Joy" (Arthur Brown cover)	Arthur Brown, Michael Harris	3:13
8.	"Over and Out"	B. Dickinson, Jim Crichton, Richard Baker	4:32
9.	"Shoot All the Clowns" (12" Extended Remix)	B. Dickinson, Z	5:39
10.	"Laughing in the Hiding Bush" (live)	B. Dickinson, Z, A. Dickinson	4:17
11.	"The Post Alternative Seattle Fall Out" (live)	B. Dickinson, Alex Dickson, Chris Dale, Alessandro Elena	5:04
12.	"Shoot All the Clowns" (7" Remix)	B. Dickinson, Z	4:17
13.	"Tibet"		3:02
14.	"Tears of the Dragon (First Bit, Long Bit, Last Bit)"		8:20
15.	"Cadillac Gas Mask"		4:09
16.	"No Way Out...Continued"	B. Dickinson, Crichton, Baker	5:21
Total length:			78:48

All tracks are written by Bruce Dickinson.

2025 "More" Balls to Picasso bonus tracks
No.	Title	Length
11.	"Gods of War" (live in the studio)	4:55
12.	"Shoot All the Clowns" (live in the studio)	5:24

== Personnel ==
- Bruce Dickinson – vocals

Tribe of Gypsies

- Dean Ortega – vocals
- Roy Z – guitars
- Eddie Casillas – bass
- David Ingraham – drums
- Doug Van Booven – percussion
- Mario Aguilar – percussion on "Shoot All the Clowns"

Additional personnel

- Dickie Fliszar – drums on "Tears of the Dragon"
- Richard Baker – keyboards and programming

Technical personnel

- Shay Baby – production, mixing
- Spencer May – additional engineering
- Sean De Feo – engineering at Townhouse 3
- Andy Baker – engineering at Westside Studios
- Bjorn Thorsrud – engineering on "Shoot All the Clowns"
- Greg Fulginiti & Andy Van Dette – mastering at Masterdisk, New York

== Charts ==
Weekly chart performance
Chart (1994)	Peak position
Austrian Albums (Ö3 Austria)	26
Dutch Albums (Album Top 100)	82
Finnish Albums (The Official Finnish Charts)	6
German Albums (Offizielle Top 100)	46
Hungarian Albums (MAHASZ)	31
Japanese Albums (Oricon)	25
Scottish Albums (Official Charts)	92
Swedish Albums (Sverigetopplistan)	8
Swiss Albums (Schweizer Hitparade)	29
UK Albums (Official Charts)	21
US Billboard 200	185
