= Roy Z =

American guitarist (born 1968)

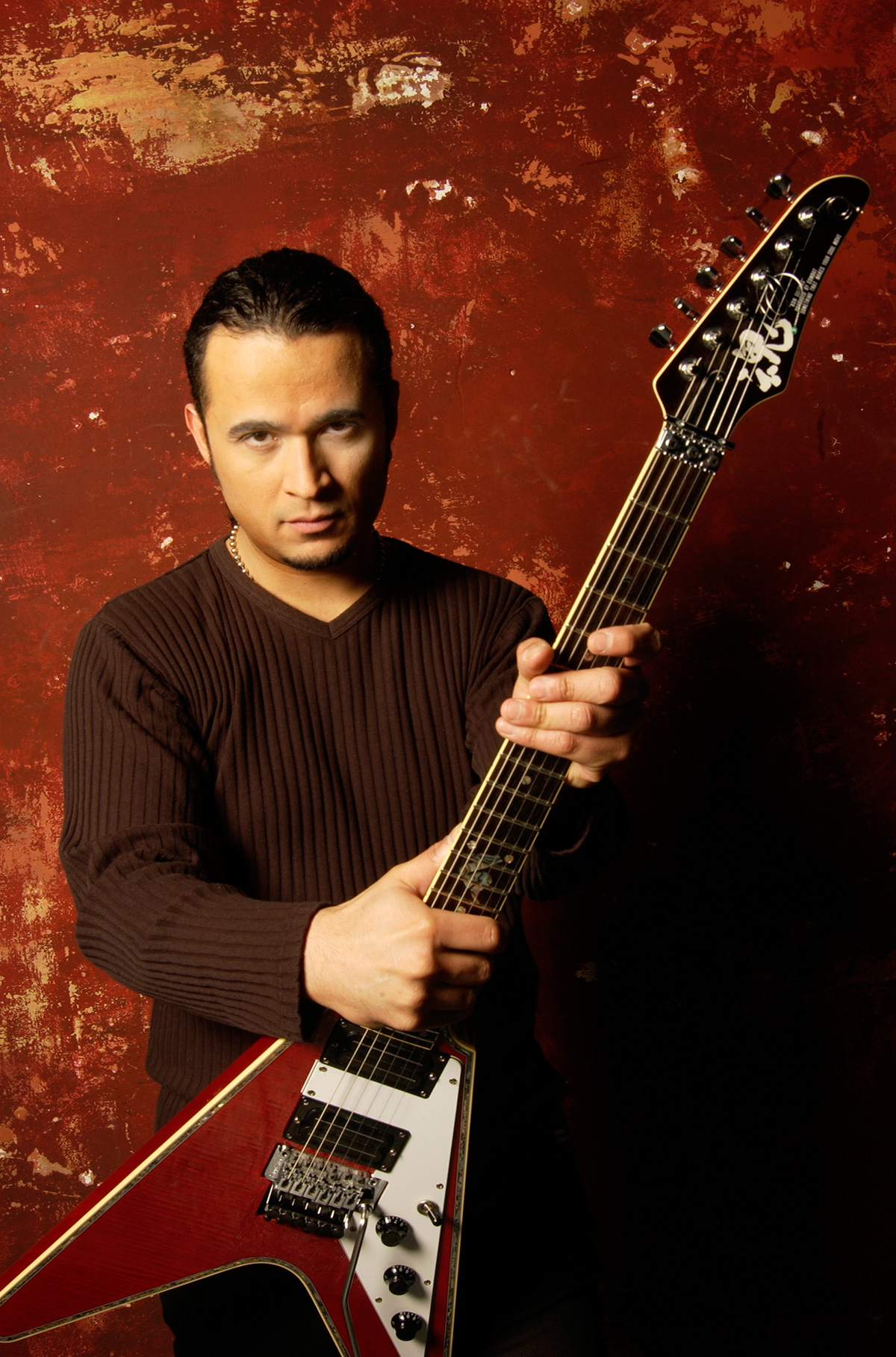

Background information
- Also known as: Roy Zerimar
- Born: Roy Ramirez; 21 February 1968 (age 58); Pacoima, Los Angeles, California, U.S.
- Genres: Heavy metal; hard rock; power metal; Latin rock
- Occupations: Musician, songwriter, producer
- Instrument: Guitar
- Member of: Tribe of Gypsies
- Website: royzmusic.com

Roy Z Ramirez (born 21 February 1968) is an American guitarist, songwriter and record producer, best known for his work with Bruce Dickinson (from Iron Maiden), Halford, and Judas Priest. He also is the founder of Tribe of Gypsies, a Latin-influenced hard rock band. Roy also helped write and produce the band Life After Death in 1996.

== Biography ==
Roy Z was born Roy Ramirez in Pacoima, Los Angeles, California, United States, but changed his name in the 1980s because he felt "ethnic names were not trendy at the time". Roy reversed Ramirez and became 'Roy Zerimar', though people began calling him 'Roy Z' for short. Roy began playing guitar and studying music at a young age, influenced by players such as Peter Green, Uli Roth, Jimmy Page, Frank Marino, Carlos Santana, Michael Schenker, Yngwie Malmsteen, Jeff Beck, and Robin Trower. He was featured in Mike Varney's "Spotlight" column in Guitar Player magazine.

A regular on the Southern California hard rock scene in the late 1980s, Roy played with several bands, including Seventh Thunder, Gypsy Moreno, Royal Flush, Driver, Warrior, and Mike Vescera. In 1991, Roy recorded a 5-song demo which netted a record deal with German indie label Dream Circle Records and led to the formation of Tribe of Gypsies.

When Bruce Dickinson split with Iron Maiden in 1993, he hand picked Roy and Tribe of Gypsies members Eddie Casillas (bass), David Ingraham (drums), and Doug van Booven (percussion) to complete his solo band. Adding a Latin feel to the metal legend's distinctive voice, the resulting album Balls to Picasso is a somewhat eclectic affair, ranging from the power ballad "Tears of the Dragon" (which also received a music video) to the doomy rocker "Cyclops". Although recorded in 1993, the self-titled Tribe of Gypsies debut album did not surface until 1996 when it was finally released on JVC/Victor in Japan. Three more releases followed in quick succession before the band finally toured the U.S. for the first time, supporting Santana on a handful of dates on the Supernatural tour.

After the commercial failure of his alternative rock styled Skunkworks album in 1996, Bruce Dickinson re-teamed with Roy on 1997's critically acclaimed Accident of Birth which also featured guitarist Adrian Smith (of Iron Maiden). The band would follow up strongly with 1998's The Chemical Wedding, a concept album with a darker feel but equally praised along with Accident of Birth as a fan favorite, even jokingly called by some "The best Iron Maiden album since Seventh Son."

Roy gained widespread industry acclaim for his work with Dickinson, and in 2000 he was tapped to produce the Rob Halford solo album Resurrection, which featured the duet "The One You Love to Hate" with Dickinson, as well as Helloween's The Dark Ride. Roy would go on to produce and co-write every Halford album to date as well as taking over on guitar for the departing Pat Lachman in 2003. Roy also re-connected with his former Driver bandmate, vocalist Rob Rock, for a series of albums starting with 2000's Rage of Creation.

Roy and Bruce again teamed up in 2003 to write and record Tyranny of Souls, released on Sanctuary Records. The pair could not find time to write the album together, so Roy would send riffs to Bruce, who was on the road with Iron Maiden, and Bruce would write melodies and lyrics. The album was recorded in Roy's studio, and featured session players on drums and bass. Roy himself took a turn on bass for 2 songs, "Believil" and "Power of the Sun." Vocals for the album were done in less than 2 weeks, with Bruce sleeping on a cot in the studio to maximize time. Dickinson had also been injured during a fall at an Iron Maiden show and was all but unable to stand. The album had to be shelved for more than eight months (later released in 2005), however, when in 2004, Roy got the call to produce and mix Judas Priest's reunion album Angel of Retribution. Shortly thereafter, Roy was tapped by former Skid Row frontman Sebastian Bach to produce his 2007 solo album, Angel Down, which included a guest vocal appearance by Guns N' Roses mainman Axl Rose.

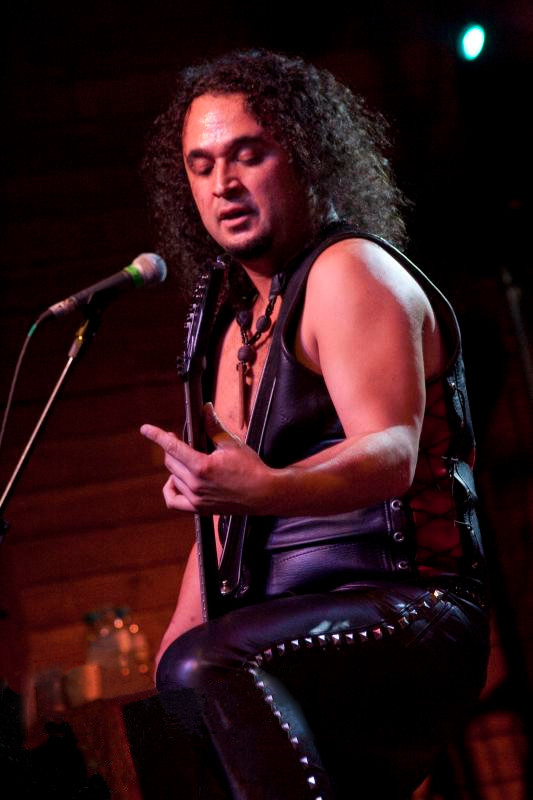
Roy Z performing in 2010

In 2008, Roy and Rob Rock re-activated their long dormant band Driver and released their full-length debut, Sons of Thunder, which included re-recordings of the songs from the band's 1990 cassette EP. Roy also took part in the Halford reunion and has played guitar alongside "Metal" Mike Chlasciak on all subsequent studio and live releases since, starting with the 2009 Christmas album, Halford III: Winter Songs. Roy has also continued his production work, including Ravenous by Swedish heavy metal band Wolf in 2009 and Brazilian thrashers Sepultura's twelfth album, Kairos, in 2011.

In March 2013, news leaked that Roy was once again working with Bruce Dickinson and that the project would also involve former Scorpions guitarist Uli Jon Roth with whom both Z and Dickinson have performed live on different occasions. Ultimately, no new album with Dickinson would materialize but Dickinson has since acknowledged that "If Eternity Should Fail", the opener on Iron Maiden's 2015 album, The Book of Souls, stemmed from writing and demo sessions with Roy, although Dickinson is listed as the sole writer in the credits.

In 2014, Z's band, Tribe of Gypsies, were invited to play the Rock of Ages Festival in Seebronn, Germany, their first and only show on the European continent to date. They also played a rare L.A. show supporting Latin all-stars De La Tierra, led by Sepultura's Andreas Kisser. In early 2016, Tribe released a video for "Yeah!", their first new song since 2006's Dweller on the Threshold.

Z has continued to keep busy working as a producer, engineer and mixer, most recently with artists such as former Nevermore vocalist Warrel Dane, Peruvian metal band Flor de Loto, Russian rockers Aria, and all-star project Spirits of Fire featuring Tim "Ripper" Owens (ex-Judas Priest, Iced Earth), Chris Caffery (Savatage, Trans-Siberian Orchestra), Steve Di Giorgio (Testament, Death), and Mark Zonder (ex-Fates Warning, Warlord). Z also co-wrote, played guitar on and produced the 2019 West Bound debut album, Volume One, a project fronted by his former Tribe of Gypsies bandmate, vocalist Chas West (Jason Bonham Band, Resurrection Kings).

After 11 years, in 2024, the album Bruce Dickinson and Roy have worked on has been finally released. It was named The Mandrake Project and it is a concept album following about Dr. Necropolis. In February 2024 it was officially announced that Roy would not be joining Bruce Dickinson's "House Band From Hell" for live performances in support of the new album throughout the summer. It was later confirmed via Roy Z's social media posts that there was a falling out between the two and they would no longer be collaborating.

== Discography ==
=== with Bruce Dickinson ===
- 1994 Balls to Picasso
- 1997 Accident of Birth
- 1998 The Chemical Wedding
- 1999 Scream for Me Brazil
- 2002 The Best of Bruce Dickinson
- 2005 Tyranny of Souls
- 2006 Anthology (DVD)
- 2024 The Mandrake Project

=== with Tribe of Gypsies ===
- 1996 Tribe of Gypsies
- 1997 Nothing Lasts Forever
- 1998 Revolucion 13
- 2000 Standing on the Shoulders of Giants aka Tribe of Gypsies III
- 2006 Dweller on the Threshold

=== with Rob Rock ===
- 2000 Rage of Creation
- 2003 Eyes of Eternity
- 2005 Holy Hell
- 2007 Garden of Chaos

=== with Driver ===
- 1990 Driver cassette EP
- 2008 Sons of Thunder
- 2012 Countdown

=== with Halford ===
- 2006 Metal God Essentials, Vol. 1
- 2009 Halford III: Winter Songs
- 2010 Live in Anaheim CD & DVD
- 2010 Halford IV: Made of Metal
- 2011 Halford Live at Saitama Super Arena DVD

=== with West Bound ===
- 2019 Volume One

== Guest appearances ==
- 1995 Various – Rattlesnake Guitar – The Music of Peter Green (guitars on "Oh Well")
- 1997 Last Temptation – Last Temptation (lead guitar on "Real Love"; lead & additional rhythm guitar on "Voodou Man")
- 1998 Warrior – Ancient Future (guitar on 6 songs)
- 1999 MVP – Animation (lead guitar on "Chances" and "Animation")
- 1999 Steel Prophet – Dark Hallucinations (lead guitar on "We Are Not Alone")
- 2000 Glenn Hughes – From the Archives Volume I - Incense & Peaches (guitar on "Let's Get Together")
- 2000 Various – Randy Rhoads Tribute (lead guitar on "Goodbye to Romance")
- 2001 W.A.S.P. – Unholy Terror (lead guitar on "Who Slayed Baby Jane?" and "Wasted White Boys")
- 2003 Cage – Darker Than Black (lead guitar on "Wings of Destruction" and "March of the Cage")
- 2005 Tribuzy – Execution (lead guitar on "Beast in the Light")
- 2007 Mnemic – Passenger (lead guitar on "Meaningless")
- 2007 Tribuzy – Execution Live Reunion DVD (guitar on "Tears of the Dragon" and "Beast in the Light")
- 2011 Ray Burke – Humanity Street (guitar on "Planet Funk", "Sands of Time" and "Outerbass")
- 2017 Ian Ray Logan – King of Twilight (lead guitar on "Blaze of Glory")
- 2021 Offensive – Awenasa (lead guitar on "Seer of Vision")

== Production discography ==
- 1994 Downset – Downset
- 1995 Klover – Beginning to End (EP)
- 1995 Klover – Feel Lucky Punk
- 1995 Tree – Downsizing the American Dream
- 1996 Life After Death – Life After Death
- 1996 Tribe of Gypsies – Tribe of Gypsies
- 1996 Downset – Do We Speak a Dead Language?
- 1997 Bruce Dickinson – Accident of Birth
- 1997 Last Temptation – Last Temptation
- 1997 Roadsaw – Nationwide
- 1997 Tribe of Gypsies – Nothing Lasts Forever
- 1998 Bruce Dickinson – The Chemical Wedding
- 1998 Tribe of Gypsies – Revolucion 13
- 1999 Bruce Dickinson – Scream for Me Brazil
- 2000 Downset – Check Your People
- 2000 Halford – Resurrection
- 2000 Helloween – The Dark Ride
- 2000 Rob Rock – Rage of Creation
- 2000 Tribe of Gypsies – Standing on the Shoulders of Giants
- 2001 Halford – Live Insurrection
- 2001 Bruce Dickinson – The Best of Bruce Dickinson
- 2002 Halford – Crucible
- 2002 Halford – Fourging the Furnace (EP)
- 2003 Rob Rock – Eyes of Eternity
- 2005 Judas Priest – Angel of Retribution
- 2005 Bruce Dickinson – Tyranny of Souls
- 2005 Rob Rock – Holy Hell
- 2007 Sebastian Bach – Angel Down
- 2007 André Matos – Time to Be Free
- 2007 Rob Rock – Garden of Chaos
- 2008 Yngwie Malmsteen – Perpetual Flame
- 2008 Halford – Live at Rock in Rio III DVD
- 2008 Driver – Sons of Thunder
- 2009 Wolf – Ravenous
- 2009 Massacration – Good Blood Headbanguers
- 2009 Halford – Halford III: Winter Songs
- 2010 Halford – Live in Anaheim CD & DVD
- 2010 Halford – Halford IV: Made of Metal
- 2011 Halford – Halford Live at Saitama Super Arena DVD
- 2011 Sepultura – Kairos
- 2011 DownSiid – Life of Lies
- 2012 Imminent Sonic Destruction – Recurring Themes
- 2012 Driver – Countdown
- 2013 Leatherwolf – Unchained
- 2014 Immortal Guardian – Revolution Part I
- 2014 Kattah – Lapis Lazuli
- 2015 Jupiter Falls – Revolution
- 2018 Flor de Loto – Eclipse
- 2018 Aria – Curse of the Seas
- 2019 Spirits of Fire – Spirits of Fire
- 2019 West Bound – Volume One
