= The Mandrake Project =

Studio album by Bruce Dickinson
- Released: 1 March 2024
- Recorded: 2019–2023
- Studio: Doom Room (Los Angeles)
- Genres: Heavy metal, hard rock
- Length: 58:49
- Label: BMG
- Producer: Roy Z

Bruce Dickinson chronology
Tyranny of Souls (2005)	The Mandrake Project (2024)	PsychoGod (2027)

Singles from The Mandrake Project
- 1. "Afterglow of Ragnarok" Released: 30 November 2023; 2. "Rain on the Graves" Released: 25 January 2024; 3. "Resurrection Men" Released: 26 July 2024

Professional ratings
Aggregate scores
Source	Rating
Metacritic	72/100
Review scores
Source	Rating
Blabbermouth	9/10
Classic Rock	4/5 stars
Kerrang!	4/5
Metal Hammer	4.5/5 stars
Metal Injection	9/10
MetalSucks	2.5/5 stars
PopMatters	7/10
Record Collector	4/5 stars
Uncut	6/10

The Mandrake Project is the seventh studio album by Iron Maiden vocalist Bruce Dickinson, released on 1 March 2024 through BMG Rights Management. The songwriting on the album was split between Roy Z and Dickinson. This is Dickinson's first solo album in nearly two decades since 2005's Tyranny of Souls, marking the longest gap between two studio albums in his solo career. The artist announced a worldwide promotional tour of the album.

The album was announced on 1 December 2023 simultaneously alongside its first single, a companion comic book series to be published the following year, and tour dates for the UK and Europe throughout Spring and Summer 2024. The album marks the final collaboration between Dickinson and Roy Z.

== Concept and comics ==
Part of the original announcement for the album explained that it would be a narrative concept album accompanied by a 12-issue comic book series published by Z2 Comics. The story was written by Dickinson, scripted for the comics by Tony Lee and illustrated by Staz Johnson. The announcement stated that the full story would be "a dark, adult story of power, abuse and a struggle for identity, set against the backdrop of scientific and occult genius." Dickinson would later say the original intent was only the comic, but he grew ambitious and added a related album. Conception of the album begun in 2014 under the title If Eternity Should Fail, with Dickinson writing songs alongside producer Roy Z. Once Iron Maiden bassist and main composer Steve Harris heard the demo for the planned title track "If Eternity Should Fail", he asked Dickinson to bring it to the band's new album, The Book of Souls. After doing so, Dickinson decided he would not feature the song as the album's centrepiece, eventually reworking it into "Eternity Has Failed", featuring different music and slightly different lyrics. Dickinson would leave the project aside for seven years given he underwent a cancer treatment and toured with Iron Maiden, reviving it during the COVID-19 pandemic, renaming it The Mandrake Project and deciding to keep a few of the already composed songs like "Shadows of the Gods" mostly unchanged. One of the tracks, "Sonata (Immortal Beloved)", was even older than the initial concept, emerging from a short instrumental based on Moonlight Sonata that Z recorded after watching Immortal Beloved, to which Dickinson quickly improvised some lyrics. During production, Dickinson's wife Leana found the demo, liked it and encouraged him to include the song in the album.

The first single released to promote The Mandrake Project was "Afterglow of Ragnarok" on 30 November 2023. The song was released digitally and as a 7" vinyl single in a gatefold sleeve, which included an 8-page prequel comic inside. The B-side of the single featured Dickinson's original solo demo of "If Eternity Should Fail".

"Rain on the Graves" was the second single from the album, released on 25 January by BMG Records and accompanied by a music video similar to the first single. The song features a guitar riff, keyboard sections and a narrative vocal performance. The song was inspired by Dickinson's visit to the grave of Romantic poet William Wordsworth in the Lake District.

== Editions and packaging ==
The album was released in various configurations on both CD and vinyl LP, as well as digitally on all major streaming and download platforms. The CD version had two main configurations on release. The standard CD came in a three-panel full-color cardboard sleeve with a 20-page booklet inside the first panel, containing lyrics and production details. A limited-edition version of this included a lenticular cover, which is loose and not glued to the front of the actual case. This edition was exclusive to Walmart in the US and HMV in the UK.

A deluxe limited edition of the CD came in a 7" hardback book which contained a preview of the album's companion comic book series. The CD was in a cardboard pouch inside the book, and the book came in a slipcase. The lyrics booklet from the standard CD was also included. The slipcase had the same cover art as the standard CD, while the book had exclusive cover art by comic book artist Bill Sienkiewicz. Some copies pre-ordered from Dickinson's official online store included a signed photo inside the book. The vinyl LP version came on standard black vinyl, with a limited-edition version on blue vinyl and including an exclusive 'M' stencil. Copies of the black vinyl pre-ordered from Dickinson's official online store came with a signed art card.

=== Year-end lists ===
Select year-end rankings
Publication/critic	Accolade	Rank	Ref.
Rolling Stone	Top Metal Albums of 2024	5	
The Metal Voice	Top Metal Albums of 2024	2	
Loudwire	Best Metal Albums of 2024	9	
Metal Hammer	Best Albums of 2024	5	
Classic Rock	Best Albums of 2024	4	
Brave Words	Best Albums of 2024	2	
Something Else Reviews	Best Albums of 2024	3	
Metal Rules	Best Albums of 2024	4	

== Track listing ==
The Mandrake Project track listing
No.	Title	Writer(s)	Length
1.	"Afterglow of Ragnarok"	Bruce Dickinson, Roy Z	5:45
2.	"Many Doors to Hell"	Dickinson, Z	4:48
3.	"Rain on the Graves"	Dickinson	5:05
4.	"Resurrection Men"	Dickinson, Z	6:24
5.	"Fingers in the Wounds"	Dickinson, Z	3:39
6.	"Eternity Has Failed"	Dickinson	6:59
7.	"Mistress of Mercy"	Dickinson	5:08
8.	"Face in the Mirror"	Dickinson	4:08
9.	"Shadow of the Gods"	Dickinson, Z	7:02
10.	"Sonata (Immortal Beloved)"	Dickinson, Z	9:51
Total length:			58:44

== Personnel ==
Musicians

- Bruce Dickinson – lead vocals (all tracks), acoustic guitar (tracks 4, 8), bongo drums (4), additional keyboards (6, 7), percussion (6)
- Roy Z – guitars, bass, additional keyboards
- Dave Moreno – drums
- Giuseppe Iampieri aka. Maestro Mistheria – keyboards
- Chris Declercq – guitar solo (track 3)
- Gus G – guitar solo (track 6)
- Sergio Cuadros – woodwinds (track 6)

Technical

- Roy Z – production, mixing, engineering
- Brendan Duffey – mastering, mixing, engineering
- Roger Ramirez – mixing (track 1), engineering (1)
- Addasi Addasi – engineering
- Alonso Herrera – engineering
- Christian Cummings – engineering
- Dave Moreno – engineering
- Idriss Nadi – engineering
- Michael Harris – engineering
- Frank Gibson – engineering (track 1)
- Denis Caribaux – engineering (track 7)
- Bruce Buchhalter – mixing assistance (track 1)

== Charts ==
Chart performance
Chart (2024–2025)	Peak position
Australian Albums (ARIA)	59
Austrian Albums (Ö3 Austria)	1
Belgian Albums (Ultratop Flanders)	4
Belgian Albums (Ultratop Wallonia)	8
Croatian International Albums (HDU)	28
Czech Albums (ČNS IFPI)	87
Dutch Albums (Album Top 100)	6
Finnish Albums (Suomen virallinen lista)	2
French Albums (SNEP)	10
German Albums (Offizielle Top 100)	1
Greek Albums (IFPI)	5
Hungarian Albums (MAHASZ)	19
Irish Albums (IRMA)	78
Italian Albums (FIMI)	14
Polish Albums (ZPAV)	3
Portuguese Albums (AFP)	5
Scottish Albums (Official Charts)	2
Spanish Albums (Promusicae)	7
Swedish Albums (Sverigetopplistan)	1
Swiss Albums (Schweizer Hitparade)	2
UK Albums (Official Charts)	3
UK Independent Albums (Official Charts)	1
UK Rock & Metal Albums (Official Charts)	1
US Billboard 200	176
US Independent Albums (Billboard)	30
US Top Hard Rock Albums (Billboard)	9
