= Shoot All the Clowns =

Single by Bruce Dickinson

from the album Balls to Picasso
- Released: 26 September 1994
- Genre: Heavy metal
- Length: 4:24
- Label: EMI
- Songwriter: Bruce Dickinson

Bruce Dickinson singles chronology
"Tears of the Dragon" (1994)	"Shoot All the Clowns" (1994)	"Back from the Edge" (1996)

"Shoot All the Clowns" is the second and last single from Bruce Dickinson's second solo album, Balls to Picasso, released in August 1994.

On the Anthology DVD interview, Dickinson revealed that the song was the last one completed for Balls to Picasso on the insistence of the record label. Due to the complicated production, the record label was skeptical of the album's success. Dickinson made the song on the simple instruction that it was supposed to sound similar to Aerosmith.

== Track listing ==
- CD 1
1. "Shoot All the Clowns" (Bruce Dickinson/Roy Z) – 4:16
2. "Tibet" (Dickinson) – 3:01
3. "Tears of the Dragon" (First Bit-Long Bit-Last Bit) (Dickinson) – 8:18
- CD 2
1. "Shoot All the Clowns" (extended mix) (Dickinson/Roy Z) – 5:39
2. "Cadillac Gas Mask" (Dickinson) – 4:07
3. "No Way Out... Continued" (Dickinson/J. Crichton/R. Baker) – 5:17

== Credits ==
- Bruce Dickinson – vocals
- Roy Z – guitar
- Eddie Cassillas – bass guitar
- Dave Ingraham – drums
- Dean Ortega – backing vocals

== Chart positions ==
Chart (1994)	Peak position
UK Singles Chart	37
