= Tyranny of Souls =

Studio album by Bruce Dickinson
- Released: 23 May 2005
- Recorded: 2005
- Studio: Castle Oaks (Calabasas); Signature Sound (San Diego); Dexter's Laboratory (Note: Not to be confused with the animated television series of the same name) (Los Angeles)
- Genre: Heavy metal
- Length: 43:35
- Label: Sanctuary
- Producer: Roy Z

Bruce Dickinson chronology
The Best of Bruce Dickinson (2001)	Tyranny of Souls (2005)	Alive (2005)

Singles from Tyranny of Souls
- 1. "Abduction" Released: 2005

Professional ratings
Review scores
Source	Rating
AllMusic	3.5/5 stars
Blabbermouth.net	8.5/10
Brave Words & Bloody Knuckles	8.0/10
Metal Storm	9.0/10
Rock Hard	9.5/10

Tyranny of Souls is the sixth studio album by Iron Maiden vocalist Bruce Dickinson, released on 23 May 2005 through Sanctuary Records. The cover art is one of the panels of Earthly Vanity and Divine Salvation, a work by renaissance artist Hans Memling. This was his first solo album since rejoining Iron Maiden in 1999, and his last for nearly two decades, until the 2024 release of his follow-up album The Mandrake Project.

The songwriting on the album was split between Roy Z and Dickinson. During composition, Roy sent recordings of riffs to Dickinson, who was on tour with Iron Maiden. Dickinson subsequently wrote lyrics and melodies. Roy also served as the album's producer and played all guitar parts as well as some supplemental bass guitar and piano parts.

The other players on the album were all connected to Roy Z through different projects. Z, bassist Ray "Geezer" Burke, and keyboardist Maestro Mistheria all contributed to vocalist Rob Rock's 2003 release, Eyes of Eternity. Drummer Dave Moreno and bassist Juan Perez were members of Z's Latin rock band Tribe of Gypsies at the time.

"Kill Devil Hill" is inspired by the successful flight by the Wright brothers in 1903 (see Kill Devil Hills).

"Navigate the Seas of the Sun" is inspired by Erich Von Däniken's theory about extraterrestrial presence on Earth long ago and about man dealing with that in the future.

The title track is somewhat based on Shakespeare's tragedy MacBeth, and includes direct quotes and lines from the play throughout the song.

== Track listing ==
All tracks are written by Bruce Dickinson and Roy Z.

No.	Title	Length
1.	"Mars Within"	1:29
2.	"Abduction"	3:50
3.	"Soul Intruders"	3:52
4.	"Kill Devil Hill"	5:07
5.	"Navigate the Seas of the Sun"	5:51
6.	"River of No Return"	5:13
7.	"Power of the Sun"	3:29
8.	"Devil on a Hog"	4:01
9.	"Believil"	4:50
10.	"A Tyranny of Souls"	5:48

Japanese edition bonus track
No.	Title	Length
11.	"Eternal"	5:59

== Personnel ==
Musicians

- Bruce Dickinson – lead vocals
- Roy Z – guitars, bass guitar (tracks 7, 9), producer, engineer, mixing
- Dave Moreno – drums
- Ray "Geezer" Burke – bass guitar (tracks 1, 4–6, 8, 10)
- Juan Perez – bass guitar (tracks 2, 3)
- Maestro Mistheria – keyboards

Production

- Hatch Inagaki – second engineer
- Stan Katayama – mixing
- Jeff Wakolbinger – mixing assistant
- Tom Baker – mastering at Precision Mastering, Los Angeles

== Charts ==
Chart (2005)	Peak position
Austrian Albums (Ö3 Austria)	58
Belgian Albums (Ultratop Flanders)	76
Dutch Albums (Album Top 100)	96
Finnish Albums (Suomen virallinen lista)	10
French Albums (SNEP)	101
German Albums (Offizielle Top 100)	39
Hungarian Albums (MAHASZ)	24
Italian Albums (FIMI)	34
Japanese Albums (Oricon)	75
Scottish Albums (OCC)	60
Swedish Albums (Sverigetopplistan)	10
Swiss Albums (Schweizer Hitparade)	73
UK Albums (OCC)	65
UK Independent Albums (OCC)	10
UK Rock & Metal Albums (OCC)	6
US Billboard 200	180
