= Tears of the Dragon =

Single by Bruce Dickinson

from the album Balls to Picasso
- Released: 16 May 1994
- Recorded: 1994
- Genre: Hard rock
- Length: 6:23
- Label: EMI
- Songwriter: Bruce Dickinson

Bruce Dickinson singles chronology
| "Born in '58" (1990) | "Tears of the Dragon" (1994) | "Shoot All the Clowns" (1994) |

"Tears of the Dragon" is the first single from Bruce Dickinson's second solo album, Balls to Picasso, released on 16 May 1994. AllMusic called "Tears of the Dragon" a "magnificent" track, "by far the album's best song".

Lyrically, the song describes Dickinson's feelings about leaving Iron Maiden.

== Track listing ==
- CD 1
1. "Tears of the Dragon" – 6:23
2. "The Breeding House" – 5:20
3. "No Way Out... to be Continued" – 7:31
- CD 2
1. "Tears of the Dragon" (acoustic chill-out) – 4:34
2. "Winds of Change" – 4:15
3. "Spirit of Joy" – 3:13

== Credits ==
- Bruce Dickinson – vocals
- Roy Z – guitar
- Eddie Cassillas – bass guitar
- Dickie Fliszar – drums

== Chart positions ==
| Chart (1994) | Peak position |
|---|---|
| UK Singles Chart | 28 |
| US Billboard Hot Mainstream Rock Tracks | 36 |
