= The Chemical Wedding (Bruce Dickinson album) =

- The cover art is a reproduction of The Ghost of a Flea by William Blake

Studio album by Bruce Dickinson
- Released: 15 September 1998
- Recorded: January–June 1998
- Studio: Sound City and Silver Cloud, Los Angeles
- Genre: Heavy metal
- Length: 57:32
- Label: Air Raid (UK); CMC International (US); Victor (Japan)
- Producer: Roy Z

Bruce Dickinson chronology
Accident of Birth (1997)	The Chemical Wedding (1998)	Scream for Me Brazil (1999)

Singles from The Chemical Wedding
- 1. "Killing Floor" Released: 1998

The Chemical Wedding is the fifth solo album by English heavy metal singer Bruce Dickinson, released on 15 September 1998 through Dickinson's own label Air Raid Records. The record draws some inspiration from the works of William Blake, featuring sung and spoken excerpts of his prophetic works and poetry (notably "And did those feet in ancient time" on the track "Jerusalem"), and with cover art from his painting The Ghost of a Flea, although the name of the album and its title track derive from the Rosicrucian manifesto the Chymical Wedding of Christian Rosenkreutz. As with the previous album, it featured Iron Maiden guitarist Adrian Smith, then a member of Dickinson's solo outfit. This was his last solo album before he and Adrian Smith rejoined Iron Maiden the following year.

The film, Chemical Wedding, with a screenplay by Dickinson, was released in May 2008. It features the title track from the album on its soundtrack, but concerns a story about the reincarnation of Aleister Crowley and is otherwise unrelated.

== Lyrical themes ==
Dickinson: "Each song has a sort of frame in which it operates. The first song is about fear, the second song is about tragedy, the third song is about union. You could pick a theme or a topic for each song so that's what the song is about and then you put it in a frame. For example, one of the songs is about failure and the song is called "The Trumpets of Jericho". In the story of the trumpets of Jericho in the Bible, the walls fall down when the tribes of Israel walk around the city and blow their trumpets. Except in this song they don't, it doesn't work. You've done everything right, everything's cool but the wall's still standing. And what do you do? How do you face up to that fact? And it's all part of the whole alchemy thing. What were the alchemists trying to do? They were trying to achieve something that was virtually impossible, they spent their whole lives trying to do it, and all of them failed, or pretty damn near all of them failed. So, what does that feel like, and how does that work, and why keep carrying on. So that's the way the songs kind of work. And you don't have to go into them in all this detail, you could just sit back there and let it hit you over the head like a sledgehammer cause the album works it's just a really heavy album. But it's all there if you want to dig through the words."

== Additional recordings ==
According to an interview with Rock Brigade in October 1998, Bruce mentioned that the band recorded a cover of the Scorpions song, "The Zoo". Although never released as a b-side or bonus track, it did see release that same year on the compilation ECW: Extreme Music.

== Reception ==
Professional ratings
Review scores
Source	Rating
AllMusic	4/5 stars
Chronicles of Chaos	9.5/10
Collector's Guide to Heavy Metal	9/10
Rock Hard	9/10
Sputnikmusic	4.5/5

Critical response to The Chemical Wedding was generally favourable, with AllMusic praising its "modern metal aesthetic". Sputnikmusic said, "Professionally written and recorded, Bruce Dickinson once again pours his soul into his music, and the result is spectacular", and went on to deem it "one of the best metal albums of the late 90s". In 2005, The Chemical Wedding was ranked number 388 in Rock Hard magazine's book The 500 Greatest Rock & Metal Albums of All Time. In his review, Canadian journalist Martin Popoff praised Dickinson for finding "creative wells that seems limitless, and groovy and literary all at once" and for having recorded an album "of phat, traditional, somber and aged heavy metal that sounds like bloody, beefy Piece of Mind-era Maiden crossed with Subhuman Race-era Skid Row."

== Track listing ==
All tracks are written by Bruce Dickinson and Roy Z, unless otherwise noted.

Original track listing
No.	Title	Writer(s)	Length
1.	"King in Crimson"		4:43
2.	"Chemical Wedding"		4:06
3.	"The Tower"		4:45
4.	"Killing Floor"	Dickinson; Adrian Smith	4:29
5.	"Book of Thel"	Dickinson; Z; Eddie Casillas	8:13
6.	"Gates of Urizen"		4:25
7.	"Jerusalem"	Dickinson; Z; William Blake	6:42
8.	"Trumpets of Jericho"		5:59
9.	"Machine Men"	Dickinson; Smith	5:41
10.	"The Alchemist" (6:00 in expanded edition, includes reprise of "Chemical Wedding")		8:27

Original pressings also include an untitled hidden track after 2 minutes of silence. It is a brief spoken piece that says: "And all this vegetable world appeared on my left foot. As a bright sandal, formed immortal of precious stones and gold. I stooped down, and bound it on. To walk forward through eternity".

Expanded Edition bonus tracks
No.	Title	Writer(s)	Length
11.	"Return of the King"	Dickinson; Smith	5:06
12.	"Real World"		3:59
13.	"Confeos" (includes the untitled hidden track found at the end of "The Alchemist" on earlier editions.)		7:35

== Personnel ==
Band members

- Bruce Dickinson – lead vocals
- Adrian Smith – guitars, keyboards
- Roy Z – guitars, keyboards, production, engineering, mixing
- Eddie Casillas – bass
- David Ingraham – drums, percussion

Additional personnel

- Arthur Brown – voice on tracks 5, 7, 13
- Greg Schultz – additional keyboards
- Frazeeke MC, The Guru, Willy 666, Craig Lichtenstein – backing vocals on track 4

Technical personnel

- Stan Katayama – engineering, mixing at Brooklyn Studios, Los Angeles
- Joe Floyd – engineering
- Richard "The Guru" Carette, Sam Storey, Thom Banghardt – assistant engineers
- Dave Collins – mastering at A&M Mastering Studios, Los Angeles

== Charts ==
Chart (1998)	Peak position
Finnish Albums (Suomen virallinen lista)	22
German Albums (Offizielle Top 100)	41
Japanese Albums (Oricon)	64
Scottish Albums (OCC)	70
Swedish Albums (Sverigetopplistan)	31
UK Albums (OCC)	55
UK Independent Albums (OCC)	8
UK Rock & Metal Albums (OCC)	1
