= Accident of Birth =

Studio album by Bruce Dickinson
- Released: 3 June 1997
- Recorded: 1997
- Studios: Silver Cloud Recording, Redondo Beach, California; Sound City Studios, Los Angeles, California
- Genre: Heavy metal
- Length: 53:38
- Labels: Raw Power/Castle (UK); CMC International (US)
- Producer: Roy Z

Bruce Dickinson chronology
Skunkworks (1996)	Accident of Birth (1997)	The Chemical Wedding (1998)

Singles from Accident of Birth
- 1. "Accident of Birth" Released: May 1997; 2. "Man of Sorrows" Released: 1997

Accident of Birth is the fourth studio album by Bruce Dickinson, released on 3 June 1997 through Castle Communications' sub‑label Raw Power in the UK and through CMC International in the US.

Dickinson's second collaboration with guitarist/producer Roy Z, the album is markedly different in style from his previous effort, Skunkworks. As well as Roy Z, Dickinson was joined for the album by fellow former Iron Maiden member Adrian Smith; both Dickinson and Smith would later return to their former band in early 1999. Thanks to the slightly bigger success of this album than his previous solo releases, Dickinson would continue to work with Roy Z on his subsequent albums, The Chemical Wedding (1998), Tyranny of Souls (2005) and The Mandrake Project (2024)

== Album artwork ==
The cover art was produced by Derek Riggs, best known for being the creator of Iron Maiden's mascot, Eddie, and the artwork on all of Iron Maiden's albums, singles, posters and tour brochures throughout 1980–1990 (and sporadically afterwards up until 2000's Brave New World, other than one additional Eddie drawing for the cover of his book Run for Cover). In reference to this, the jester puppet featured on the cover was jokingly christened Edison ("Eddie's Son"). A grim reaper is also faintly visible in the background, such a figure having previously been included by Riggs in his artwork for Iron Maiden's Live After Death and Somewhere in Time albums, as well as on the band's earlier single "The Trooper".

Four versions of the album cover exist. Originally, the artwork showed Edison graphically bursting from a man's stomach, but for the original European release this image was cropped to remove the man's head (although the poster that came with the limited edition of the album included the original, unedited image). The cover was deemed too explicit for the US market, where the album was instead released with completely different artwork showing a frontal view of Edison. The 2005 re-release again used a different image for the cover, showing the puppet nailed to a cross; this image had previously been used for the Japan-only "Man of Sorrows" single. Finally, the extended edition of the album features the original, unedited artwork, with the head of the man from whom Edison is bursting clearly visible.

== Critical reception ==
Professional ratings
Review scores
Source	Rating
AllMusic	4/5 stars
Collector's Guide to Heavy Metal	8/10
Metal Storm	10/10
Rock Hard	9.5/10

The German magazine Rock Hard previewed Accident of Birth as the "Album of the Month" in May 1997. The reviewer praised Dickinson's voice and the songwriting: "Bruce sings like a young god – actually better and more expressive than ever – and has based his songwriting on the milestones of his Maiden years, with the new/old sidekick Adrian Smith coming at the right time" to deliver "their best material since Seventh Son of a Seventh Son". In 2005, Accident of Birth was ranked number 338 in Rock Hard magazine's book of The 500 Greatest Rock & Metal Albums of All Time.

Contemporary reviews are equally positive. Stephen Thomas Erlewine of AllMusic defined the album "intriguing" and "better than many latter-day Maiden efforts". Canadian journalist Martin Popoff described Accident of Birth as "an unabashed metal record, produced smoothly and firmly" and added that it "would have made an intelligent, and ironically daring Maiden reunion record".

== Track listing ==
All tracks are written by Bruce Dickinson and Roy Z, unless otherwise noted.

No.	Title	Writer(s)	Length
1.	"Freak"		4:15
2.	"Toltec 7 Arrival"		0:37
3.	"Starchildren"		4:17
4.	"Taking the Queen"		4:49
5.	"Darkside of Aquarius"		6:42
6.	"Road to Hell"	Bruce Dickinson, Adrian Smith	3:57
7.	"Man of Sorrows"	Dickinson	5:20
8.	"Accident of Birth"		4:23
9.	"The Magician"		3:54
10.	"Welcome to the Pit"	Dickinson, Smith	4:43
11.	"Omega"		6:23
12.	"Arc of Space"		4:18
Total length:			53:38

CMC International Records (U.S. and Japan)
No.	Title	Writer(s)	Length
1.	"Freak"		4:15
2.	"Toltec 7 Arrival"		0:37
3.	"Starchildren"		4:17
4.	"Taking the Queen"		4:49
5.	"Darkside of Aquarius"		6:42
6.	"Road to Hell"	Bruce Dickinson, Adrian Smith	3:57
7.	"Man of Sorrows"	Dickinson	5:20
8.	"Accident of Birth"		4:23
9.	"The Magician"		3:54
10.	"Welcome to the Pit"	Dickinson, Smith	4:43
11.	"The Ghost of Cain" (Only on this release)	Dickinson, Smith	4:12
12.	"Omega"		6:23
13.	"Arc of Space"		4:18
Total length:			57:50

== 2005 Expanded Edition Disc 2 ==
An extended edition of the album was released with the following tracks on CD 2. Tracks 1–4 appear on the 2 part CD single "Accident of Birth". Tracks 5–9 also feature on the Japanese CD release of "Man of Sorrows".

All tracks are written by Bruce Dickinson and Roy Z, unless otherwise noted.

2005 Expanded Edition Disc 2
No.	Title	Writer(s)	Length
1.	"The Ghost of Cain"	Dickinson, Smith	4:12
2.	"Accident of Birth" (Demo)		4:15
3.	"Starchildren" (Demo)		5:01
4.	"Taking the Queen" (Demo)		4:30
5.	"Man of Sorrows" (Radio Edit)		3:55
6.	"Man of Sorrows" (Orchestral Version)		5:17
7.	"Hombre Triste" (Spanish version of "Man of Sorrows")		3:53
8.	"Darkside of Aquarius" (Demo)		6:20
9.	"Arc of Space" (Demo)		4:02
Total length:			41:25

== Personnel ==
Band members

- Bruce Dickinson – vocals
- Adrian Smith – guitars
- Roy Z – guitars, mellotron, piano, production, engineering, mixing
- Eddie Casillas – bass
- David Ingraham – drums

Additional personnel

- Silvia Tsai – violin on "Taking the Queen", "Man of Sorrows" and "Arc of Space"
- Rebecca Yeh – cello on "Taking the Queen", "Man of Sorrows" and "Arc of Space"
- Richard Baker – piano on "Man of Sorrows"
- Norbert Newfied – string arrangements

Technical personnel

- Stan Katayama – engineering and mixing at Brooklyn Recordings, Los Angeles (on tracks 1, 3–5, 7, 8 and 10–13)
- Joe Floyd – engineering and mixing at Silver Cloud Recordings (on tracks 2, 6 and 9)
- Greg Fidelman, Tom Banghart – assistant engineers

== Charts ==
Chart (1997)	Peak position
Dutch Albums (Album Top 100)	93
Finnish Albums (Suomen virallinen lista)	13
German Albums (Offizielle Top 100)	52
Hungarian Albums (MAHASZ)	38
Japanese Albums (Oricon)	30
Scottish Albums (Official Charts)	66
Swedish Albums (Sverigetopplistan)	46
UK Albums (Official Charts)	53
UK Rock & Metal Albums (Official Charts)	4
