= Skunkworks (album) =

- Cover design by Storm Thorgerson

Studio album by Bruce Dickinson
- Released: 19 February 1996
- Studio: Great Linford Manor (Milton Keynes, England)
- Genre: Alternative metal; hard rock
- Length: 47:29
- Label: Raw Power/Castle
- Producer: Jack Endino

Bruce Dickinson chronology
Alive in Studio A (1995)	Skunkworks (1996)	Accident of Birth (1997)

Singles from Skunkworks
- 1. "Back from the Edge" Released: 1 April 1996; 2. "Solar Confinement / Inside the Machine" Released: 1996

Professional ratings
Review scores
Source	Rating
AllMusic	3/5 stars
Collector's Guide to Heavy Metal	8/10
Rock Hard	8.0/10

Skunkworks is the third solo studio album by English heavy metal vocalist Bruce Dickinson, released in 1996. It is the first and only studio album recorded with the musicians Dickinson put together for the tour supporting the album Balls to Picasso (1994). They disbanded by the end of 1996.

== Overview ==
Bruce Dickinson had intended Skunkworks to be the debut album of a band by the same name. However, his label would not issue the record under any name other than Bruce Dickinson. The album moved from Iron Maiden's traditional heavy metal style to a sound similar to that of bands such as Rush and Soundgarden. The album name refers to the Lockheed code name for an elite military design group. It was produced by Jack Endino, best known for Nirvana's debut album Bleach.

"I had this argument with (my manager) Rod," Dickinson recalled, "and he told me, 'You're a heavy metal singer. You can't change. You can try, but you're stuck with it.' I object to that… I don't mind being a heavy metal singer, but I object to anyone telling me I can't fucking change… Anyway, off we went into the Skunkworks thing… At the end of it all, I was gutted. I should have had a grunge career right then, because I was very angry, very disaffected and I was poor."

The band began touring in the UK and the US in August 1996 in support of the album. Despite his musical evolution, the tour for the album was the first on which Dickinson included a song from his former band: a slightly reworked version of "The Prisoner". Live performances were recorded and filmed in Pamplona and Gerona, Spain on 31 May and 1 June 1996 and four songs were released in an EP titled Skunkworks Live in Japan only in October 1996, through Victor Entertainment. A live video of the shows was released in Japan as Skunkworks Live Video.

The band did not last and, for his next solo project, Accident of Birth, Dickinson reunited with guitarist Roy Z (from Balls to Picasso).

A 2005 rerelease of Skunkworks included previously unreleased songs, and the Skunkworks Live EP.

== Cover art ==
Hipgnosis designer Storm Thorgerson produced the cover art, starting with a hired tree with foliage shaped somewhat like a brain – a play on the town of Braintree, Essex. The tree was trucked to a lake in Scotland, and a photograph was taken with Dickinson standing under the tree. Hipgnosis freelance artist Richard Manning digitally shaped the foliage in Photoshop, and a mirror image was applied. Alterations were made to each side to break the mirrored perfection. Inside the album, bandmember faces were also represented in mirror image, showing one side of their face copied to the other side.

== Track listings ==
All tracks are written by Bruce Dickinson and Alex Dickson, except where noted.

No.	Title	Writer(s)	Length
1.	"Space Race"		3:47
2.	"Back from the Edge"		4:17
3.	"Inertia"		3:04
4.	"Faith"		3:35
5.	"Solar Confinement"		3:20
6.	"Dreamstate"		3:50
7.	"I Will Not Accept the Truth"		3:45
8.	"Inside the Machine"		3:28
9.	"Headswitch"		2:14
10.	"Meltdown"		4:35
11.	"Octavia"		3:15
12.	"Innerspace"	Dickinson, Dickson, Chris Dale	3:31
13.	"Strange Death in Paradise"		4:50

Skunkworks Live
No.	Title	Writer(s)	Length
1.	"Inertia"		3:53
2.	"Faith"		3:23
3.	"Innerspace"		4:10
4.	"The Prisoner" (Iron Maiden cover)	Adrian Smith, Steve Harris	5:44

2005 expanded edition (disc 2)
No.	Title	Writer(s)	Length
1.	"I'm in a Band with an Italian Drummer"	Dale	3:53
2.	"Rescue Day"		4:09
3.	"God's Not Coming Back"		2:16
4.	"Armchair Hero"		2:42
5.	"R 101"		2:06
6.	"Re-entry"		4:05
7.	"Americans Are Behind"	Dale	2:51
8.	"Inertia" (live)		3:53
9.	"Faith" (live)		3:23
10.	"Innerspace" (live)		4:10
11.	"The Prisoner" (live, Iron Maiden cover)		5:44

== Personnel ==
Band members

- Bruce Dickinson – vocals
- Alex Dickson – guitar
- Chris Dale – bass
- Alessandro Elena – drums

Production

- Jack Endino – producer, engineer, mixing at Lansdowne Studios, London
- Adi Winman – assistant engineer
- Jeff Mann – mixing assistant
- Ian Cooper – mastering at Metropolis, London

== Charts ==
Chart (1996)	Peak position
Finnish Albums (Suomen virallinen lista)	8
Japanese Albums (Oricon)	69
Scottish Albums (OCC)	55
Swedish Albums (Sverigetopplistan)	40
UK Albums (OCC)	41
UK Rock & Metal Albums (OCC)	3
