= Tattooed Millionaire (song) =

Single by Bruce Dickinson

from the album Tattooed Millionaire
- Released: 17 April 1990
- Genre: Hard rock, pop metal
- Length: 4:28
- Label: Sony Music
- Songwriter: Bruce Dickinson

Bruce Dickinson singles chronology
"Tattooed Millionaire" (1990)	"All the Young Dudes" (1990)

"Tattooed Millionaire" is song by English heavy metal singer Bruce Dickinson. It was released on his debut solo album, also titled Tattooed Millionaire. It was also the lead single from the album, released on 17 April 1990. "Tattooed Millionaire" reached number 18 on the UK charts. The promotional video was directed by Storm Thorgerson. According to Ultimate Classic Rock, the song is about "celebrity tabloid rockers". A 1990 review published in The Georgia Straight, says the song "takes a not-so-subtle stab at the excesses of the L.A. rock ’n’ roll lifestyle, particularly that led by Vince Neil and his Motley gang". Nikki Sixx has said that he heard the song is about him, inspired by Dickinson's then-wife cheating on him with Sixx, though Sixx claims Dickinson found out about the affair after reading The Dirt.

== Track listing ==
1. Tattooed Millionaire – 4:29
2. Ballad of Mutt – 3:37
3. Winds of Change – 3:23

== Personnel ==
- Bruce Dickinson – vocals
- Janick Gers – guitar
- Andy Carr – bass
- Fabio Del Rio – drums

=== Chart positions ===
Chart (1990)	Peak position
UK Singles Chart	18
