= Tattooed Millionaire =

Studio album by Bruce Dickinson
- Released: 8 May 1990
- Recorded: 1989
- Studio: Battery (London)
- Genre: Heavy metal
- Length: 43:15
- Label: EMI
- Producer: Chris Tsangarides

Bruce Dickinson chronology
Tattooed Millionaire (1990)	Balls to Picasso (1994)

Singles from Tattooed Millionaire
- 1. "Tattooed Millionaire" Released: 17 April 1990; 2. "All the Young Dudes" Released: 11 June 1990; 3. "Dive! Dive! Dive!" Released: 13 August 1990; 4. "Born in '58" Released: 25 March 1991

Professional ratings
Review scores
Source	Rating
AllMusic	4/5 stars
Collector's Guide to Heavy Metal	7/10
Rock Hard	9.0/10

Tattooed Millionaire is the debut solo studio album by Iron Maiden vocalist Bruce Dickinson, released in 1990.

The album project began when Dickinson was asked to record a song for A Nightmare on Elm Street 5: The Dream Child, and so wrote "Bring Your Daughter... to the Slaughter". Collaborating with future Iron Maiden guitarist Janick Gers, Dickinson began creating a solo album which was fundamentally different from his works with Iron Maiden, with a hard rock sound that is less progressive. "Bring your Daughter..." wasn't included on the original release, as Iron Maiden planned to record an alternate version for their 1990 album No Prayer for the Dying, which went on to become the band's only number one single on the UK Singles Chart to date.

The album did however yield four Top 40 singles in the UK, with the lead and title single "Tattooed Millionaire", reaching No. 18. A cover of the David Bowie penned, Mott the Hoople hit "All the Young Dudes", was also a relative success, reaching No. 23.

== Track listings ==
All tracks are written by Bruce Dickinson and Janick Gers, except where noted.

Original track listing
No.	Title	Writer(s)	Length
1.	"Son of a Gun"		5:55
2.	"Tattooed Millionaire"		4:28
3.	"Born in '58"		3:40
4.	"Hell on Wheels"		3:39
5.	"Gypsy Road"		4:02
6.	"Dive! Dive! Dive!"		4:41
7.	"All the Young Dudes" (Mott the Hoople cover)	David Bowie	3:50
8.	"Lickin' the Gun"		3:17
9.	"Zulu Lulu"		3:28
10.	"No Lies"	Dickinson	6:17

2002 Sony Legacy edition bonus tracks
No.	Title	Writer(s)	Length
11.	"Spirit of Joy" (Arthur Brown cover)	Arthur Brown, Michael Harris	3:12
12.	"Darkness Be My Friend"	Dickinson	2:01
13.	"Sin City" (AC/DC cover)	Bon Scott, Angus Young, Malcolm Young	4:37
14.	"Winds of Change"		4:14
15.	"Riding with the Angels" (live, Russ Ballard cover)	Russ Ballard	4:20

2005 expanded edition (second CD)
No.	Title	Writer(s)	Length
1.	"Bring Your Daughter... to the Slaughter" (original soundtrack version)	Dickinson	5:01
2.	"Ballad of Mutt"		3:35
3.	"Winds of Change"		3:23
4.	"Darkness Be My Friend"	Dickinson	2:03
5.	"Sin City"	Scott, A. Young, M. Young	4:40
6.	"Dive! Dive! Dive!" (live)		4:43
7.	"Riding with the Angels" (live)	Ballard	4:20
8.	"Sin City" (live)	Scott, A. Young, M. Young	4:49
9.	"Black Night" (live, Deep Purple cover)	Ritchie Blackmore, Ian Gillan, Roger Glover, Jon Lord, Ian Paice	4:33
10.	"Son of a Gun" (live)		5:54
11.	"Tattooed Millionaire" (live)		4:35

== Personnel ==
Musicians

- Bruce Dickinson – vocals
- Janick Gers – guitars
- Andy Carr – bass
- Fabio Del Rio – drums

Technical personnel

- Chris Tsangarides – producer, engineer
- Nigel Green – mixing
- Chris Marshall – assistant engineer
- Ian Cooper – mastering at Townhouse Studios, London

== Charts ==
Chart (1990)	Peak position
Finnish Albums (The Official Finnish Charts)	7
German Albums (Offizielle Top 100)	39
Swedish Albums (Sverigetopplistan)	33
Swiss Albums (Schweizer Hitparade)	35
UK Albums (OCC)	14
US Billboard 200	100

== Certifications ==
Region	Certification	Certified units/sales
United Kingdom (BPI)	Silver	60,000^{^}
^{^} Shipments figures based on certification alone.
