= List of Samson band members =

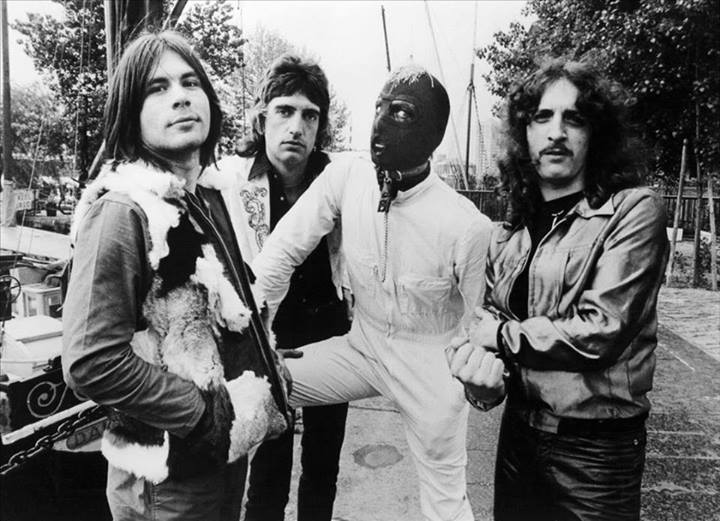
1979–1981 lineup

Samson were an English heavy metal band from London. Formed in summer 1977, the group originally featured vocalist and guitarist Paul Samson, bassist Chris Aylmer and drummer Clive Burr. The group were active until the eponymous frontman's death in 2002, at which point their lineup included lead vocalist Nicky Moore, bassist Ian Ellis and drummer Billy Fleming.

== History ==
=== 1977–1985 ===
Samson were formed by Paul Samson, Chris Aylmer and Clive Burr in the summer of 1977. In March 1978, the group briefly experimented with a four-piece lineup featuring Stewart Cochrane on bass and Aylmer on rhythm guitar, however this was abandoned after one performance. The band released their first single "Telephone" in September, before Mark Newman briefly took over on lead vocals for a run of shows. Burr was replaced by Barry "Thunderstick" Purkis in early 1979, after which the group recorded their first album Survivors with Samson's former bandmate John McCoy producing.

Shortly after the release of Survivors, Samson brought in Bruce Dickinson as their new frontman, who took on the stage name "Bruce Bruce". Head On and Shock Tactics followed over the next two years, before Purkis left to form his own band Thunderstick in July 1981. He was replaced by Mel Gaynor in time for Reading Festival the following month, which proved to be Dickinson's final show with Samson when he accepted an offer to join Iron Maiden in September. He was soon replaced by Nicky Moore. Gaynor stepped back from the band in January 1982 and Pete Jupp took his place.

The lineup of Moore, Samson, Aylmer and Jupp released Before the Storm and Don't Get Mad, Get Even, before Aylmer was replaced by Merv Goldsworthy and Dave "Bucket" Colwell joined on rhythm guitar in 1984. In 1985, the group disbanded and released a final live album called Thank You and Goodnight..., with Samson and Colwell later forming Paul Sampson's Empire.

=== 1987–2002 ===
In 1987, Samson reformed his eponymous band with Empire vocalist Mick White, adding bassist Dave Boyce, drummer Charlie Mack and keyboardist Toby Sadler. The group released the EP And There It Is... the following year, before White was replaced by Peter Scallan in February 1989. A new album called Look to the Future was recorded later in the year, but after being rejected by a number of record labels was remixed with new bass and extra guitar parts from Samson; the result, Refugee, was released the following year, before Samson was injured and the group became inactive.

After two years performing under the moniker Paul Samson's Rogues, the eponymous frontman formed a new lineup of Samson in 1992, with drummer Tony Tuohy and returning bassist Chris Aylmer. The group continued to tour and released Samson in 1993. Tuohy left in early 1994 and the band broke up again.

In the summer of 1999, Samson reunited with Aylmer and Thunderstick for a series of anniversary shows; the reunion was originally slated to include vocalist Bruce Dickinson, however he ultimately rejoined Iron Maiden and Samson remained a trio. In 2000, Nicky Moore returned as the band's frontman for a series of shows. The following year, Samson and Moore began work on a new studio album tentatively titled Brand New Day, adding new members Ian Ellis on bass and Billy Fleming on drums. However, before the album could be finished, Paul Samson died of cancer on 9 August 2002.

Producer John McCoy continued to work on the recordings after Samson's death, releasing them as P.S. in 2006.

== Members ==
Image	Name	Years active	Instruments	Release contributions
	Paul Samson	1977–1986; 1987–1990; 1992–1994; 1999–2002 (until his death)	lead and rhythm guitars; vocals (lead 1977–79, 1986–87 and 1993–2002)	all Samson releases
	Chris Aylmer	1977–1984; 1992–1994; 1999–2001 (died 2007)	bass; rhythm guitar; backing vocals	all Samson releases from Head On (1980) to Don't Get Mad, Get Even (1984), and from Live at Reading '81 (1990) onwards
	Clive Burr	1977–1978 (died 2013)	drums	"Telephone" (1978); "Mr Rock & Roll" (1978)
	Stewart Cochrane	1978	bass	none – one live performance only
	Mark Newman	1978	lead vocals	none – live performances only
	Thunderstick (Barry Purkis)	1979–1981; 1999–2001	drums; percussion; backing vocals	all Samson releases from Survivors (1979) to Shock Tactics (1981); Metal Crusade '99 (1999); Live in London 2000 (2000)
	John McCoy	1979; 1985–1986	bass	Suvivors (1979); Joint Forces (1986)
	Bruce Bruce (Bruce Dickinson)	1979–1981	lead vocals	Head On (1980); Biceps of Steel (1980); Shock Tactics (1981); Live at Reading '81 (1990)
	Mel Gaynor	1981–1982	drums	Live at Reading '81 (1990)
	Nicky Moore	1981–1986; 2000–2002 (died 2022)	lead vocals	Before the Storm (1982); Don't Get Mad, Get Even (1984); Thank You and Goodnight... (1985); Joint Forces (1986); Live in London 2000 (2000); P.S.... (2006)
	Pete Jupp	1982–1984	drums	Before the Storm (1982); Don't Get Mad, Get Even (1984); Thank You and Goodnight... (1985)
	Dave "Bucket" Colwell	1984	rhythm guitar; backing vocals	Thank You and Goodnight (1985)
	Merv Goldsworthy	1984	bass	Thank You and Goodnight (1985)
	Edgar Patrik	1985–1986	drums	Joint Forces (1986)
	Charlie Mack	1987–1989	drums	And There It Is... (1988); Refugee (1990)
	Toby Sadler	1987–1989	keyboards; backing vocals	And There It Is... (1988); Refugee (1990)
	Dave Boyce	1987–1989	bass	And There It Is... (1988)
	Mick White	1987–1989	lead vocals	And There It Is... (1988)
	Peter Scallan	1989–1990	lead vocals	Refugee (1990)
	Tony Tuohy	1992–1994	drums	Samson (1993)
	Rik Anthony	1990	lead vocals	none – live performances only
	Ian Ellis	2001–2002	bass; backing vocals	P.S.... (2006)
	Billy Fleming	2001–2002	drums; percussion	P.S.... (2006)

== Lineups ==
Period	Members	Releases
Summer 1977 – March 1978	Paul Samson – guitar, lead vocals; Chris Aylmer – bass, backing vocals; Clive Burr – drums	Telephone (1978); Mr Rock & Roll (1978)
March 1978	Paul Samson – lead guitar, lead vocals; Chris Aylmer – rhythm guitar, backing vocals; Stewart Cochrane – bass; Clive Burr – drums	none
March – October 1978	Paul Samson – guitar, lead vocals; Chris Aylmer – bass, backing vocals; Clive Burr – drums	Telephone (1978)
October 1978	Mark Newman – lead vocals; Paul Samson – guitar, backing vocals; Chris Aylmer – bass, backing vocals; Clive Burr – drums	none
October – December 1978	Paul Samson – guitar, lead vocals; Chris Aylmer – bass, backing vocals; Clive Burr – drums	Mr Rock & Roll (1978)
January – July 1979	Paul Samson – guitar, lead vocals; John McCoy – bass, backing vocals; Thunderstick – drums, backing vocals	Survivors (1979)
June 1979 – July 1981	Bruce Bruce – lead vocals; Paul Samson – guitar, backing vocals; Chris Aylmer – bass, backing vocals; Thunderstick – drums, backing vocals	Head On (1980); Biceps of Steel (1980); Shock Tactics (1981)
August – September 1981	Bruce Bruce – lead vocals; Paul Samson – guitar, backing vocals; Chris Aylmer – bass, backing vocals; Mel Gaynor – drums	Live at Reading '81 (1990)
September 1981 – January 1982	Nicky Moore – lead vocals; Paul Samson – guitar, backing vocals; Chris Aylmer – bass, backing vocals; Mel Gaynor – drums	none
January 1982 – early 1984	Nicky Moore – lead vocals; Paul Samson – guitar, backing vocals; Chris Aylmer – bass, backing vocals; Pete Jupp – drums	Before the Storm (1982); Don't Get Mad, Get Even (1984)
February 1984 – May 1984	Nicky Moore – lead vocals; Paul Samson – lead guitar, backing vocals; Dave Colwell – rhythm guitar, backing vocals; Merv Goldsworthy – bass; Pete Jupp – drums	Thank You and Goodnight (1985)
1985–1986	Nicky Moore – lead vocals; Paul Samson – lead guitar, backing vocals; John McCoy – bass; Edgar Patrik – drums	Joint Forces (1986)
Band inactive 1986–1987
March 1987 – February 1989	Mick White – lead vocals; Paul Samson – guitar, backing vocals; Dave Boyce – bass; Charlie Mack – drums; Toby Sadler – keyboards, backing vocals	And There It Is... (EP, 1988); 1988 (1993)
February 1989 – August 1989	Peter Scallan – lead vocals; Paul Samson – guitar, backing vocals; Dave Boyce – bass; Charlie Mack – drums; Toby Sadler – keyboards, backing vocals	Look to the Future (2018); Refugee (1990) (without Boyce)
Band inactive 1990–1992
1990	Rik Anthony – lead vocals; Paul Samson – guitar, backing vocals; Chris Aylmer – bass, backing vocals; Thunderstick – drums, backing vocals	Past Present & Future (1999)
Spring 1992 – early 1994	Paul Samson – guitar, lead vocals; Chris Aylmer – bass, backing vocals; Tony Tuohy – drums, backing vocals	Samson (1993)
Band inactive 1994–1999
Summer 1999 – early 2000	Paul Samson – guitar, lead vocals; Chris Aylmer – bass, backing vocals; Thunderstick – drums, backing vocals	Metal Crusade '99 (1999)
2000–2001	Nicky Moore – lead vocals; Paul Samson – guitar, backing vocals; Chris Aylmer – bass, backing vocals; Thunderstick – drums, backing vocals	Live in London 2000 (2000)
2001–2002	Nicky Moore – lead vocals; Paul Samson – guitar, backing vocals; Ian Ellis – bass, backing vocals; Billy Fleming – drums, percussion	P.S.... (2006)
