= Live at Reading '81 =

1990 live album by Samson

Live album by Samson
- Released: 1990
- Recorded: 12 September 1981
- Venues: Reading Festival, Caversham Bridge, Reading
- Genre: Heavy metal
- Length: 52:49
- Label: Raw Fruit
- Producer: Tony Wilson

Samson chronology
Pillars of Rock (1990)	Live at Reading '81 (1990)	Refugee (1990)

Professional ratings
Review scores
Source	Rating
AllMusic	3.5/5 stars
Collector's Guide to Heavy Metal	7/10

Live at Reading '81 was the second live album released by Samson. This was recorded in 1981 at the Reading Festival, with singer Bruce Dickinson, just before he left the band to join Iron Maiden.

Live at Reading '81 has been issued on CD numerous times, including editions by Raw Fruit (UK, 1990), Grand Slamm (US, 1990), Repertoire (Germany, 1990), Jimco (Japan, 1990), Bruce Dickinson's short lived Air Raid label (UK, 2000), Castle Music (UK, 2001), and Dissonance Productions (UK, 2017). The Castle and Dissonance versions include 3 bonus tracks, "Red Skies", "Turn Out the Lights" and "Firing Line", 2-track recordings from a June 1981 rehearsal for the Shock Tactics tour. "Red Skies" and "Turn Out the Lights" were subsequently recorded with new vocalist Nicky Moore for the band's 1982 studio album, Before the Storm.

The song "Gravy Train" was re-worked and appears as "I'll Be 'Round" on Before the Storm.

== Track list ==
1. "Big Brother" - 6:14
2. "Take It Like a Man" - 4:10
3. "Nice Girl" - 3:21
4. "Earth Mother" - 5:06
5. "Vice Versa" - 5:27
6. "Bright Lights" - 2:54
7. "Walking Out on You" - 9:11
8. "Hammerhead" - 3:36
9. "Riding with the Angels" - 5:22
10. "Gravy Train" - 7:24

=== 2001 & 2017 re-issue bonus tracks ===
1. "Red Skies" (June 1981 rehearsal)
2. "Turn Out the Lights" (June 1981 rehearsal)
3. "Firing Line" (June 1981 rehearsal)

== Personnel ==
Samson

- "Bruce Bruce" Dickinson – vocals
- Paul Samson – guitar
- Chris Aylmer – bass guitar
- Mel Gaynor – drums

=== Production ===
- Tony Wilson - producer and engineer for The Friday Rock Show on BBC Radio 1
- Chris Tsangarides - 1990 remixes
