= Before the Storm (Samson album) =

Studio album by Samson
- Released: November 1982
- Recorded: August–September 1982
- Studios: Music Works Studios, London
- Genre: Hard rock
- Length: 39:48
- Label: Polydor
- Producer: Jo Julian

Samson chronology
Shock Tactics (1981)	Before the Storm (1982)	Don't Get Mad, Get Even (1984)

Professional ratings
Review scores
Source	Rating
AllMusic	3.5/5 stars
Collector's Guide to Heavy Metal	9/10

Before the Storm is the fourth studio album by British hard rock/heavy metal band Samson, released in 1982. It is the band's first album with vocalist Nicky Moore, who was recruited to replace Bruce Dickinson after Dickinson joined Iron Maiden. The drummer Mel Gaynor was also replaced by Pete Jupp, when Gaynor left to join Simple Minds. The album was included in the three-disc The Polydor Years, issued by Caroline International in 2017. The set also includes their followup album Don't Get Mad, Get Even and a third CD with various B-sides, live and studio rarities.

== Reception ==
The album has received decent reviews from critics and fans. A review from AllMusic gave it a decent rating, mentioning how with the departure of Dickinson the band had traded some of their New Wave of British Heavy Metal edge for a less explosive but more natural-sounding hard rock grit. Rivadavia described the album as a "promising start" to the new line-up, with the music moving more toward hard rock and away from heavy metal.

== Track listing ==
Side one
No.	Title	Writer(s)	Length
1.	"Dangerzone"	Paul Samson, Chris Aylmer, Nicky Moore	5:54
2.	"Stealing Away"	Samson, Aylmer, Moore	4:22
3.	"Red Skies"	Samson, Thunderstick, Aylmer, Bruce Dickinson	3:46
4.	"I'll Be 'Round"	Samson, Aylmer, Moore, Pete Jupp	3:14
5.	"Test of Time"	Samson, Aylmer, Moore, Jupp	4:09

Side two
No.	Title	Writer(s)	Length
1.	"Life on the Run"	Samson, Aylmer, Moore, Jupp	4:01
2.	"Turn Out the Lights"	Samson, Thunderstick, Aylmer, Dickinson	4:02
3.	"Losing My Grip"	Samson, Thunderstick, Aylmer, Dickinson	3:29
4.	"Young Idea"	Samson, Aylmer, Moore, Jupp	7:24

=== 2002 CD Reissue bonus tracks ===
No.	Title	Writer(s)	Length
10.	"Running Out of Time"	Samson, Aylmer, Moore	4:21
11.	"Driving with Z.Z."	Samson, Aylmer, Moore, Jupp	4:18
12.	"Living, Loving, Lying"	Samson, Aylmer, Moore, Jupp	5:17
13.	"Pyramid to the Stars"	Samson, Dickinson, Aylmer, Thunderstick	5:09
14.	"Front Page News"	Samson, Aylmer, Moore, Jupp	4:31
15.	"Riding with the Angels" (Russ Ballard cover)	Russ Ballard	4:34

- Originally release 1982. Digitally transferred by Paul Samson at YDS Norwich, England, 2001. Remastered by Mr. Mestad at Molten Metal Mastering Lab, 2002.

=== Notes ===
- The track "I'll Be 'Round" was originally written with Dickinson and appears as "Gravy Train" on the Live at Reading '81 album. Nicky Moore would re-write the lyrics for the re-worked Before the Storm studio version.
- 2-track recordings of "Red Skies" and "Turn Out the Lights" from a June 1981 rehearsal, with Dickinson on vocals, are included as bonus tracks on the 2001 Castle Music re-issue and the 2017 Dissonance Productions edition of Live at Reading 81.
- The original version of "Losing My Grip", recorded with Dickinson during the Shock Tactics sessions in early 1981 but left unreleased for two decades, can be found on the 2001 Castle Music re-issue and the 2017 Dissonance Productions edition of Shock Tactics.

== Personnel ==
Samson

- Nicky Moore – lead vocals
- Paul Samson – guitar
- Chris Aylmer – bass guitar
- Pete Jupp – drums

Additional musicians

- Ian Gibbons – keyboards
- Jo Julian – synthesizers on "Dangerzone"

Production

- Jo Julian – producer, engineer
- Ian Cooper – mastering at The Townhouse, London
- Alwyn Clayden – art direction
- Barry Thorpe – painting
- Shoot That Tiger! – design
- Terry McLellan – management
