= Don't Get Mad, Get Even (album) =

Studio album by Samson
- Released: 23 March 1984
- Recorded: August–September 1983
- Studios: Musicworks, London, "Are You Ready" and "Dr. Ice" recorded at Advision Studios
- Genre: Hard rock
- Length: 44:18
- Label: Polydor
- Producer: Pip Williams

Samson chronology
Before the Storm (1982)	Don't Get Mad, Get Even (1984)	Joint Forces (1986)

Don't Get Mad, Get Even is the fifth studio album by British hard rock/heavy metal band Samson, released in 1984. Don't Get Mad, Get Even was included in the three-disc compilation The Polydor Years, issued by Caroline International in 2017, which also includes the album Before the Storm and a third CD with various B-sides, live and studio rarities. This compilation was the only official transfer of the original record to CD. An unofficial bootleg was made and sold in New Zealand, released in 1997 on CD.

== Reception ==
Professional ratings
Review scores
Source	Rating
AllMusic	3/5 stars
Collector's Guide to Heavy Metal	9/10
Rock Hard	9.0/10

Reviews have been generally positive of the album since its release. Götz Kühnemund of the German magazine Rock Hard praised it, highly recommending it to metal fans and going on to say that it "grows with every listen and even becomes Samson's best album!" They compared the LP to being roughly on the same hardness level as Def Leppard's Pyromania album and that it will, therefore "not appeal to every headbanger. But every Samson fan won't be able to get it off the turntable after listening to it for the first time!"

== Track listing ==
Original vinyl release

All songs written by Paul Samson, Chris Aylmer, Nicky Moore and Pete Jupp

Side one
No.	Title	Length
1.	"Are You Ready"	4:31
2.	"Love Hungry"	3:05
3.	"Burning Up"	4:34
4.	"The Fight Goes On"	4:22
5.	"Don't Get Mad, Get Even"	6:19

Side two
No.	Title	Length
6.	"Into the Valley"	4:13
7.	"Bite on the Bullet"	4:15
8.	"Doctor Ice"	4:11
9.	"Front Page News"	4:31
10.	"Leaving Love (Behind)"	4:20

1997 bootleg CD bonus tracks
No.	Title	Writer(s)	Length
11.	"Front Page News" (12" Version)		4:31
12.	"La Grange" (Studio jam)		4:12
13.	"Riding with the Angels" (Russ Ballard cover)	Russ Ballard	4:08
14.	"Vice Versa" (Live)		6:28
15.	"Walking Out On You" (Live)		9:49
16.	"Bright Lights" (Live)		3:02

== Notes ==
- Originally released in 1984. Unofficially transferred to CD in 1997.
- Tracks 11 & 12 from the 12" Single "Are You Ready".
- Tracks 13 & 14 from the 12" Single "The Fight Goes On".
- Tracks 15 & 16 from the 2 x 7" Single "Life on the Run".

== Personnel ==
Samson

- Nicky Moore – vocals
- Paul Samson – guitar
- Chris Aylmer – bass
- Pete Jupp – drums

Additional musicians

- Martin Ditcham - additional percussion
- Stevie Lange, Joy Yates - backing vocals

Production

- Pip Williams - producer
- Louis Austin, Gregg Jackman - engineering
- Ian Cooper - mastering
- Alwyn Clayden - art direction
- Green Ink - artwork, design
