= Refugee (Samson album) =

Studio album by Samson
- Released: 20 August 1990
- Studios: Picnic Studios, Kent, England
- Genre: Hard rock
- Length: 45:19
- Label: Communiqué
- Producers: Paul Samson, Trevor Danby

Samson chronology
Joint Forces (1986)	Refugee (1990)	Samson (1993)

Refugee is the seventh studio album by British hard rock/heavy metal band Samson, released in August 1990 by Communiqué Records. It was the only album with Scottish singer Peter Scallan, who replaced previous singer Nicky Moore. Originally released in 1990, it was reissued by Thunderbolt Records with the studio outtake "Don't Tell Me It's Over". It was also reissued in 2018 by Cherry Red Records as part of a 3-CD box set Look to the Future, Refugee & P.S..., remastered from the original production tape, and includes four bonus tracks from the 1989 Tommy Vance BBC Friday Rock Show session.

== Reception ==
Professional ratings
Review scores
Source	Rating
AllMusic	2/5 stars
Collector's Guide to Heavy Metal	7/10
Rock Hard	6.0/10

Reviews of the album were mixed. Rock Hard commented that "Look to the Future" and "The Silver Screen" are "two more or less noteworthy tracks" that are reminiscent of the band's heyday, but followed that that's about it in terms of quality. "The remaining 30 minutes are irrelevant, mostly boring run-of-the-mill numbers that seek their justification," and that "this disc doesn't have much in common with the great legend of the early '80s." Eduardo Rivadavia of AllMusic complimented Guitarist Paul Samson as being "as reliable a performer as ever," and new singer Peter Scallan with being little more than "quite decent, if hardly spectacular." Furthermore, they added that the new tracks like "Can't Live Without Your Love," "Turn on the Light," and "State of Emergency," "fit right in with Samson's blue-collar hard rock tradition." They mentioned how the re-recorded tracks from their 1988 EP And There It Is... (opener "Good to See You," the upbeat "Too Late," and the grandiose "The Silver Screen") sounded "vastly superior" here than their original versions. All of this amounts to "a rather enjoyable LP, which left many a nostalgic metal head quietly cheering for Samson's return to prominence, no matter how unlikely – and ultimately unrealistic – such a concept would prove." The Huddersfield Daily Examiner's Andrew Hirst opined that Scallan's vocals were drowned out by the "screeching din" of the guitars.

== Track listing ==
No.	Title	Length
1.	"Good to See You"	4:15
2.	"Can't Live Without Your Love"	4:18
3.	"Turn On the Light"	4:13
4.	"Love This Time"	4:17
5.	"Room 109" (Instrumental)	3:19
6.	"State of Emergency"	4:25
7.	"Don't Tell Me It's Over" (previously unreleased studio outtake; 1995 reissue added track)	5:58
8.	"Look to the Future"	3:43
9.	"Someone to Turn to"	4:33
10.	"Too Late"	3:54
11.	"Samurai Sunset" (Instrumental)	2:18
12.	"The Silver Screen"	6:04

2018 reissue bonus tracks
No.	Title	Length
13.	"State of Emergency" (BBC Sessions 1989)
14.	"Someone to Turn to" (BBC Sessions 1989)
15.	"Love this Time" (BBC Sessions 1989)
16.	"Look to the Future" (BBC Sessions 1989)

Notes

- Track 7 was also featured on the Samson compilation Burning Emotion/The Best of 1985–1990.
- Tracks 1, 10, and 12 are re-recorded tracks from EP And There It Is... (1988).
- Tracks 13–16 recorded for the "Tommy Vance Friday Rock Show" BBC Sessions in July 1989. Dave Boyce (bass) was an official member of the band.

== Personnel ==
Samson

- Peter Scallan – vocals (except track 1), backing vocals
- Paul Samson – guitar, bass (except track 7), backing vocals
- Charlie Mack – drums (except track 5 and 11)
- Toby Sadler – keyboards, backing vocals

Additional musicians

- Gary Owen – vocals (track 1)
- Dave Boyce – bass (track 7)
- Chris Goreham – programming (track 5)
- Tony Tuohy – drums (track 11)

Production

- Brian Burrows – design
- Duncan C. Storr – cover art
- Trevor Danby – executive producer
- Paul Samson – producer, engineering
- Chris Goreham – engineering assistant
- Mike Banks – engineering assistant
