= Head On (Samson album) =

- Cover photo by Simon Fowler

Studio album by Samson
- Released: 11 July 1980
- Recorded: April–May 1980
- Studios: Kingsway Recorders, London
- Genres: Hard rock, heavy metal
- Length: 39:47
- Label: GEM/RCA
- Producer: Samson

Samson chronology
| Survivors (1979) | Head On (1980) | Shock Tactics (1981) |

Professional ratings
Review scores
| Source | Rating |
|---|---|
| AllMusic | 4.5/5 stars |
| Collector's Guide to Heavy Metal | 6/10 |

Head On is the second studio album by British hard rock band Samson, released in 1980. The cover art features the band's masked drummer, Thunderstick. This is the first album with future Iron Maiden-frontman Bruce Dickinson on vocal duties, although some later re-issues of the debut do feature alternative bonus versions of songs, re-done with Dickinson vocals.

The instrumental "Thunderburst" is credited as co-written by Steve Harris. The track is in fact a version of "The Ides of March", an early Iron Maiden song written during the brief time in 1977 in which Thunderstick was in Iron Maiden. Iron Maiden released their own version on the Iron Maiden album Killers the next year, though Steve Harris credited the song solely to himself, annoying the members of Samson.

A jazz-style spoof version of "Vice Versa", titled "Egg Timer" and credited to Cosmo Toons and the Split Knee Loons, appears on the For Gillan Fans Only album, given away for free with the first 15,000 copies of Gillan's Glory Road, released in 1980.

== Track listing ==
All tracks by Bruce Dickinson, Paul Samson, Chris Aylmer and Thunderstick except "Thunderburst" by Dickinson, Samson, Aylmer, Thunderstick and Steve Harris.

Side one
| No. | Title | Length |
|---|---|---|
| 1. | "Hard Times" | 4:42 |
| 2. | "Take It Like a Man" | 4:09 |
| 3. | "Vice Versa" | 4:44 |
| 4. | "Manwatcher" | 3:37 |
| 5. | "Too Close to Rock" | 3:36 |

Side two
| No. | Title | Length |
|---|---|---|
| 6. | "Thunderburst" (instrumental) | 2:06 |
| 7. | "Hammerhead" | 3:40 |
| 8. | "Hunted" | 3:00 |
| 9. | "Take Me to Your Leader" | 3:49 |
| 10. | "Walking Out on You" | 6:36 |

=== 2001 & 2013 Remastered CD Reissue Bonus Tracks ===
| No. | Title | Length |
|---|---|---|
| 11. | "Angel with a Machine Gun" | 2:54 |
| 12. | "Kingsway Jam" | 9:51 |

== Personnel ==
Samson

- "Bruce Bruce" Dickinson – lead vocals
- Paul Samson – guitar, vocals, mixing
- Chris Aylmer – bass guitar
- Thunderstick – drums, percussion, vocals

Production

- Paul 'Chas' Watkins, Bob Broglia – engineers
- Samson – producer, arrangements & noises
- Tony Platt – remixing at Trident Studios
- Craig Milliner – remix engineer
- Hothouse – sleeve
- Simon Fowler – sleeve photography

== Re-issues ==
Head On has seen numerous CD re-issues over the years. The first came in 1989 courtesy of German company Repertoire and in 1990 via Grand Slamm in the U.S. and Jimco in Japan, followed by Bruce Dickinson's short-lived Air Raid label in 2000. The re-issues on Castle/Sanctuary (2001) and Lemon (2013) both contain a pair of bonus tracks, "Angel with a Machine Gun" and "Kingsway Jam", not included on the earlier editions.

== Charts ==
| Chart (1980) | Peak position |
|---|---|
| UK Albums (Official Charts) | 34 |
