= Survivors (Samson album) =

Studio album by Samson
- Released: June 1979
- Recorded: April 1979
- Studios: Kingsway Recorders, London
- Genre: Heavy metal
- Length: 37:46
- Label: Laser
- Producer: John McCoy

Samson chronology
Survivors (1979)	Head On (1980)

Professional ratings
Review scores
Source	Rating
AllMusic	3/5 stars
Collector's Guide to Heavy Metal	5/10

Survivors is the debut album by British heavy metal band Samson. It was released in 1979 and, although vocalist Bruce Dickinson appears as a band member on the cover sheet, the album was completed before he joined the band, with guitarist Paul Samson on vocal duty. The re-issue on CD of the album features seven bonus tracks with Dickinson singing some tracks from the original release.

== Track listing ==
All tracks by Paul Samson and John McCoy, except "Tomorrow or Yesterday" by Paul Samson

Side one
No.	Title	Length
1.	"It's Not as Easy as It Seems"	3:07
2.	"I Wish I Was the Saddle of a Schoolgirl's Bike"	3:09
3.	"Big Brother"	6:18
4.	"Tomorrow or Yesterday"	6:34

Side two
No.	Title	Length
5.	"Koz" (instrumental)	4:26
6.	"Six Foot Under"	5:13
7.	"Inside Out"	4:10
8.	"Wrong Side of Time"	4:49

=== Bonus tracks on 2001 CD re-issue ===
No.	Title	Length
9.	"Mr. Rock 'n' Roll"	4:01
10.	"The Shuffle"	3:21

=== Bonus tracks on 2001 CD re-issue with Bruce Dickinson singing ===
No.	Title	Length
11.	"It's Not as Easy as It Seems"	3:05
12.	"I Wish I Was the Saddle of a Schoolgirl's Bike"	3:02
13.	"Big Brother"	5:48
14.	"Tomorrow or Yesterday"	5:38
15.	"Six Foot Under"	5:14
16.	"Inside Out"	4:16
17.	"Wrong Side of Time"	4:47

== Personnel ==
=== Samson ===
- Paul Samson – vocals, guitars
- Thunderstick – drums, percussion
- Chris Aylmer – bass
- Bruce Dickinson – vocals, harmonica, and guitar on bonus tracks (re-issue)

=== Additional personnel ===
- John McCoy – bass, producer
- Colin Towns – keyboards
- Bob Broglia – engineer
- Graham Collins – sleeve design, illustrations
