= Flying Heavy Metal =

British Television Show

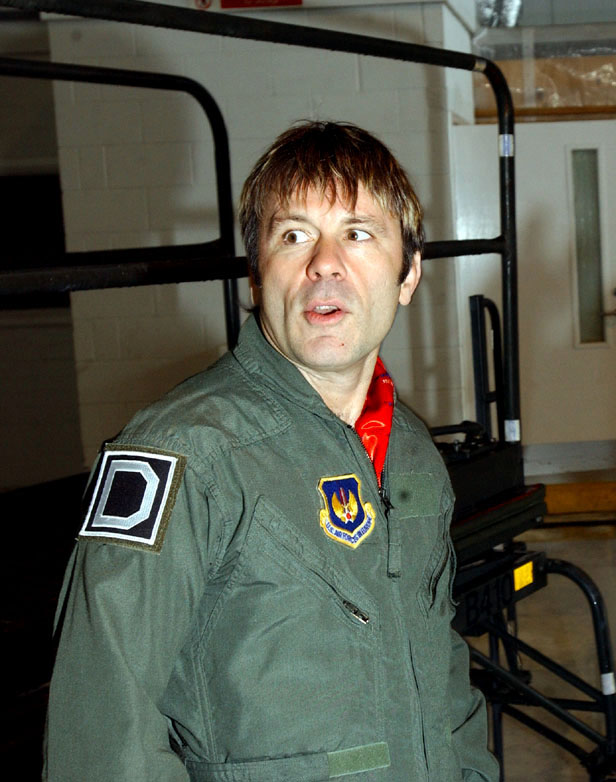
Bruce Dickinson during the filming of Flying Heavy Metal

Flying Heavy Metal is a five-part British television series produced by Ricochet and originally broadcast in the UK and Europe on the Discovery Channel, premiered on 19 January 2005, and subsequently repeated on Discovery Wings in the UK. It is presented by commercial Boeing 757 pilot and Iron Maiden frontman, Bruce Dickinson.

In the series, Dickinson looks at, and often flies, a number of aircraft from across the history of commercial aviation. There are some quite "surprising" aerobatics done in rather large aircraft.

Flying Heavy Metal is now repeated on the new channel from Discovery Networks UK called Discovery Turbo.

== Reception ==
Gabrielle Starkey of The Times wrote, "Dickinson provides a surprisingly engrossing account of the race for transatlantic passenger flight". The Independent reviewer James Rampton called Dickinson "an engaging presenter". The Daily Record wrote about Dickinson, "His enthusiasm for planes and everything about them is so infectious it makes the show watchable even if you're not that excited about the subject matter." The Liverpool Echo called Flying Heavy Metal an "engaging series in which he explores the world of air travel".

== Episodes ==
=== Episode 1 - "Jet Race" ===
Air date: 19 January 2005

The development of the de Havilland Comet and the Boeing 707 herald the end of an era for propeller-driven airliners such as the Douglas DC-3.

=== Episode 2 - "Jet Set" ===
Air date: 26 January 2005

Jet travel becomes available to the masses with the development of the Hawker Siddeley Trident and the Boeing 727.

=== Episode 3 - "Size Matters" ===
Air date: 2 February 2005

Europe develops Concorde while Boeing develops the 747 jumbo jet.

=== Episode 4 - "Safer Skies" ===
Air date: 9 February 2005

Jetliner safety enhancements, including the automatic landing capabilities of the Hawker Siddeley Trident, the fly-by-wire capabilities of the Airbus A320 (and lack thereof in the Boeing 737) as well as other safety features currently in development.

=== Episode 5 - "Watch This Space" ===
Air date: 16 February 2005

New records in airliner size, fuel economy, and passenger comfort with the Airbus A380 and the Boeing 787 (known as the 7E7 at the time). Also explores the wisdom of space airliner travel.

== Programme credits ==
Series Producer - James Bates

Producer - Dan Peirson

Assistant Producer - Greg Chivers

Production Manager - Amanda Rohan

Flying Heavy Metal - Najam Ul Saqib
