= Samson (band) =

British heavy metal band (1977–2002)

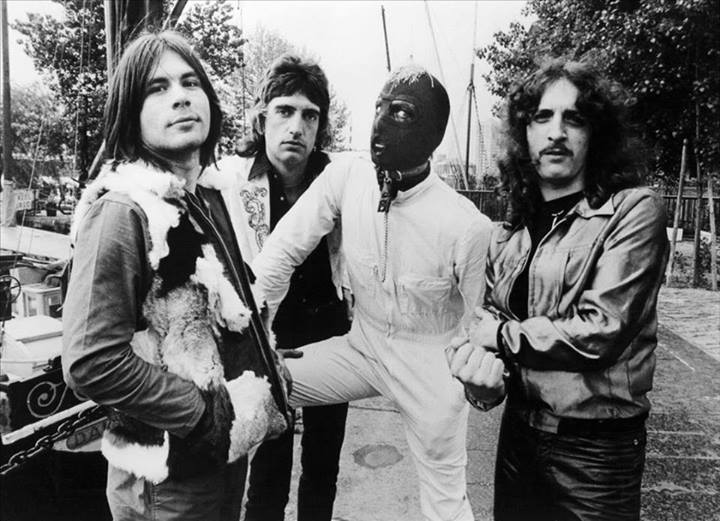
- 1979–1981 lineup

Background information
- Origin: London, England
- Genres: Heavy metal; hard rock
- Years active: 1977–2002
- Label: RCA (former)
- Past members: Paul Samson; Chris Aylmer; Clive Burr; Stewart Cochrane; Mark Newman; Thunderstick; John McCoy; Bruce Bruce; Mel Gaynor; Nicky Moore; Pete Jupp; Dave "Bucket" Colwell; Merv Goldsworthy; Edgar Patrik; Charlie Mack; Toby Sadler; Dave Boyce; Mick White; Peter Scallan; Tony Tuohy; Rik Anthony; Ian Ellis; Billy Fleming

Samson were a British heavy metal band formed in 1977 by guitarist and vocalist Paul Samson. They are best known for their first three albums with future Iron Maiden singer Bruce Dickinson, then known as "Bruce Bruce", and drummer Thunderstick (real name Barry Purkis), who wore a leather mask and performed on stage in a metal cage. Drummer Clive Burr was also a member of the band, both before and after his tenure with Iron Maiden. Dickinson's replacement on vocals, Nicky Moore, performed with Samson throughout the mid-1980s and again from the late 1990s onwards. Samson were a part of the New Wave of British Heavy Metal.

== Career ==
Samson logo

In 1976, Paul Samson replaced Bernie Tormé in London-based band Scrapyard, joining bassist John McCoy and drummer Roger Hunt. The band name was changed to McCoy, and they built up a busy gigging schedule, whilst also independently playing various sessions. Eventually, McCoy left to join Gillan and later Atomic Rooster. His replacement was the band's sound engineer and a close friend of Paul Samson's, Chris Aylmer. The following year Aylmer suggested a name change to Samson, and recommended a young drummer, Clive Burr, whom he had previously played with in the band Maya. Burr joined, and Samson was born, although for a time Paul Samson used bassist Bill Pickard and drummer Paul Gunn on odd gigs, when Aylmer and Burr were honouring previous commitments. Various other people were tried out to expand the line up: Paul Samson got in touch with an old bandmate, bass player Stewart Cochrane, and asked him to try out with the group as a four-piece, with the current bass player Chris Aylmer on second guitar alongside Paul. Only one gig was played in this incarnation, at The Nag's Head pub in Rochester, Kent on 11 March 1978, where it was decided that Samson and Aylmer's playing styles were not compatible, so they went back to being a three-piece. Cochrane later joined the avant-garde jazz-rock band Spanish Fly; and later continued his career as a band-leader for Holland America Line, Windstar Cruises. Cochrane performed and recorded with members of bands the Animals, Nashville Teens and Steve Hackett Band.

The band recorded and issued their first singles in 1978: Telephone and Mr Rock & Roll.

In October 1978, lead vocalist Mark Newman joined, but after about six shows, Paul Samson resumed lead vocals and they reverted to a three-piece line-up.

At the end of 1978, Burr left. They auditioned over 60 drummers, and eventually decided on Barry Purkis. The band were offered a recording contract, but Aylmer would not commit, so Paul Samson and Purkis decided that, as John McCoy was producing and had co-written much of the material, they would ask him to play bass on the album. The album was recorded for release on Lazer records, and given the title Survivors. In late 1979, Bruce Dickinson joined as lead vocalist under the name Bruce Bruce.

The band's second album, Head On, was released in July 1980 and peaked at No. 34 in the UK Albums Chart The supporting tour was full of controversy and legal issues, due to problems with their management. They kept writing and rehearsing for a new record. Ten songs had already been composed, by October 1980, and were ready to be recorded. This is when the vocals to some of the "Survivors"-tracks were redone with Dickinson. These re-recordings were "forgotten" until 1990 when Repertoire Records decided to re-release "Survivors" on CD with five of the Bruce songs as bonus tracks. The tour continued until the end of the year, when Samson entered the studio to record their third album, Shock Tactics. This was the last album Dickinson recorded with the band. Samson faced innumerable problems with their management. They were always being booked on ill-matched support tours. After leaving their management in 1981 they discovered that their record company was going bankrupt. Dickinson said they "made every mistake in the business". His last performance with Samson was at the Reading Festival in 1981. This was recorded by the BBC and released in 1990, as the live album Live at Reading 1981.

The group posted three entries in the UK Singles Chart. These were "Riding With The Angels" (1981, No. 54), "Losing My Grip" (1982, No. 63) and "Red Skies" (1983, No. 65).

Following Dickinson's departure, former Hackensack and Tiger vocalist Nicky Moore was recruited to front the band who had also signed a new recording contract with Polydor. Samson's first release with Moore was the "Losing My Grip" EP in 1982. The title track as well as "Pyramid to the Stars" had originally been cut with Dickinson. Those versions would remain unreleased until they surfaced on the Shock Tactics CD re-release in 2001. Samson issued two albums with Moore, 1982's Before the Storm and 1984's Don't Get Mad, Get Even. The albums were two hits, and the band became even more successful in Europe, playing with Whitesnake. In May 1984, the group disbanded with Paul Samson carrying on solo. Samson reformed in 1987 and performed until 1990, through various line-up changes. The album Refugee was launched in 1990.

In the early 1990s, Paul Samson asked New York singer/songwriter Rik Anthony to write lyrics and vocal melodies for Samson's "reunion" project with Thunderstick and Aylmer. As a collaboration, Anthony wrote and recorded the lyrics and vocal melodies for eight songs while in New York, and in London re-recorded five demos at Picnic Studios. With limited time and budget, the band could only record five demo songs and the project was never completed. The Picnic demos were never picked up by Samson's record company, and sat idle for almost nine years. Anthony, Paul Samson, Gerry Sherwin and Tony Tuohy played some shows in Germany and the Netherlands under the name Paul Samson's Rogues, and as Samson whilst opening for Girlschool. After the dates in Europe, Anthony returned to New York. Samson had a new line-up in 1993 and recorded the album Samson.

In 1999, Paul Samson released a CD containing five of the compositions from the Picnic Demos, entitled Past Present & Future. The Samson-Aylmer-Thunderstick line-up reformed for a live show in Tokyo, and in 2000, with Nicky Moore back on board, a series of live dates, including a "25th Anniversary of the NWOBHM" concert at the London Astoria on 26 May 2000, which also featured Angel Witch on the bill. Samson's performance was recorded and released as a live album. The same line-up later appeared at the Wacken Open Air rock festival on 4 August 2000.

The group effectively disbanded with Paul Samson's death from cancer on 9 August 2002. Moore paid tribute to his late bandmate at the Sweden Rock Festival on 12 June 2004, with a set entitled "Nicky Moore plays Samson".

Bass player Chris Aylmer (born Christopher Robin Aylmer, 7 February 1948) died on 9 January 2007 following a battle with throat cancer.

The band appeared in the short film Biceps of Steel in 1980, directed by Julien Temple, which was intended as the B-movie to a major feature produced and promoted by the record company. The film featured two music-video type sequences which form the 15 minute film. Though it has been largely forgotten, clips from it were seen in the movie The Incubus (1981). However, in 2006 Biceps of Steel re-surfaced on Bruce Dickinson's Anthology DVD.

Drummer Clive Burr died on 12 March 2013 after many years suffering from multiple sclerosis. Nicky Moore died on 3 August 2022 after battling with Parkinson's disease.

== Discography ==
Studio albums

- Survivors (1979)
- Head On (1980) - [UK No. 34]
- Shock Tactics (1981)
- Before the Storm (1982)
- Don't Get Mad, Get Even (1984)
- Refugee (1990)
- 1988 (1993) - expanded edition of And There It Is... (1988)
- Samson (1993) - (later reissued as Nineteen Ninety-Three)

Studio albums issued as Paul Samson solo records

- Joint Forces (1986) - (project of former Samson members issued as Paul Samson solo record)
- P.S.... (2006) - (Samson album posthumously issued as Paul Samson solo record)

Live albums

- Thank You and Goodnight (1985)
- Live at Reading '81 (1990)
- Metal Crusade '99 (1999 - featuring four bands including Samson)
- Live in London 2000 (2001)

UK singles

- Mr Rock & Roll (1978)
- Telephone (1978)
- Vice Versa / Hammerhead (1980)
- Hard Times (1980)
- Riding with the Angels (1981) - [UK No. 55]
- Losing my Grip (1982) - [UK No. 63]
- Life on the Run (1982)
- Red Skies (1983) - [UK No. 65]
- The Fight Goes on (1984)
- Are You Ready (1984)
- Vice Versa (re-release 1986)

Compilations

- Last Rites (1984)
- Head Tactics (1986)
- Pillars of Rock (1990)
- Burning Emotion: The Best of Samson (1985–1990) (1995)
- The BBC Sessions (1997)
- The Masters (1998)
- Past Present & Future (1999)
- There and Back (2001)
- Riding with the Angels: The Anthology (2002)
- Tomorrow and Yesterday (2006)

EPs

- Losing My Grip (1982)
- Life on the Run (1982)
- And There It Is... (1988)

Videos

- Biceps of Steel (1980)

== See also ==
- List of new wave of British heavy metal bands
