= Shock Tactics =

Studio album by Samson
- Released: 8 May 1981
- Recorded: 2–31 January 1981
- Studios: Battery Studios, London
- Genre: Heavy metal
- Length: 39:46
- Label: RCA
- Producer: Tony Platt

Samson chronology
Head on (1980)	Shock Tactics (1981)	Before the Storm (1982)

Singles from Shock Tactics
- 1. "Riding with the Angels" Released: 12 June 1981

Professional ratings
Review scores
Source	Rating
AllMusic	4.5/5 stars
Collector's Guide to Heavy Metal	10/10

Shock Tactics is the third studio album by British heavy metal band Samson, released in 1981. It was vocalist Bruce Dickinson's final album with the band before joining Iron Maiden (who were coincidentally recording Killers, their last album with Paul Di'Anno, in the same studio at the same time as Samson).

== Track listing ==
All tracks by Bruce Dickinson, Paul Samson, Chris Aylmer and Thunderstick, except "Riding with the Angels" by Russ Ballard.

Side one
No.	Title	Length
1.	"Riding with the Angels" (Russ Ballard cover)	3:42
2.	"Earth Mother"	4:40
3.	"Nice Girl"	3:19
4.	"Blood Lust"	6:00
5.	"Go to Hell"	3:18

Side two
No.	Title	Length
6.	"Bright Lights"	3:07
7.	"Once Bitten"	4:36
8.	"Grime Crime"	4:32
9.	"Communion"	6:32

=== 2001 CD re-issue bonus tracks ===
No.	Title	Length
10.	"Little Big Man"	3:23
11.	"Pyramid to the Stars"	5:19
12.	"Losing My Grip"	4:00

== Personnel ==
=== Samson ===
- "Bruce Bruce" Dickinson – lead and backing vocals
- Paul Samson – guitar, backing vocals
- Chris Aylmer – bass guitar, acoustic guitar, backing vocals
- Thunderstick – drums, percussion, backing vocals

=== Production ===
- Tony Platt – producer, engineer
- Graham Carmichael – assistant engineer

== Re-issues ==
Shock Tactics has seen several CD re-issues over the years. The first came in 1989 courtesy of German company Repertoire, in 1991 via Grand Slamm in the U.S. and in 1992 through Jimco in Japan, followed by Bruce Dickinson's short-lived Air Raid label in 2000. The most recent CD re-issues on Castle/Sanctuary (2001), Dissonance Productions (2017), Japan's Wasabi Records (2018), and Brazil's Hellion Records (2020) all contain 3 bonus tracks, "Little Big Man", "Pyramid to the Stars" and "Losing My Grip", not included on the earlier editions. The original 9-song album has also seen vinyl re-issues in the UK and Europe through Back on Black and in the U.S. via Real Gone Music, both in 2017.
