= Bruce Dickinson =

English heavy metal singer (born 1958)

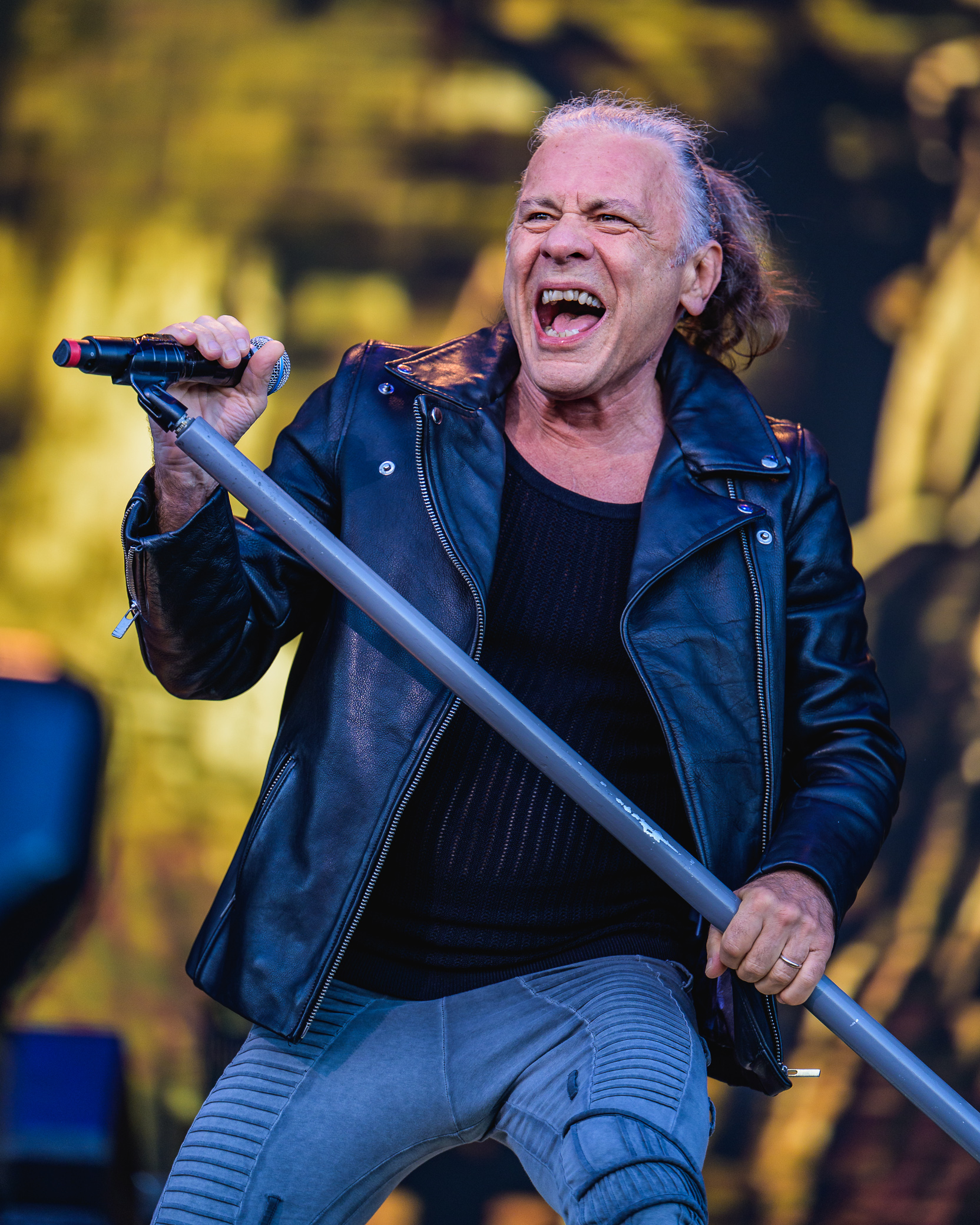
- With Iron Maiden at Tons of Rock in 2026

Background information
- Born: Paul Bruce Dickinson; 7 August 1958 (age 68); Worksop, Nottinghamshire, England
- Genre: Heavy metal
- Occupations: Singer; songwriter
- Years active: 1976–present
- Labels: EMI; Sanctuary
- Member of: Iron Maiden
- Formerly of: Samson
- Members: List of solo band members
- Website: screamforme.com

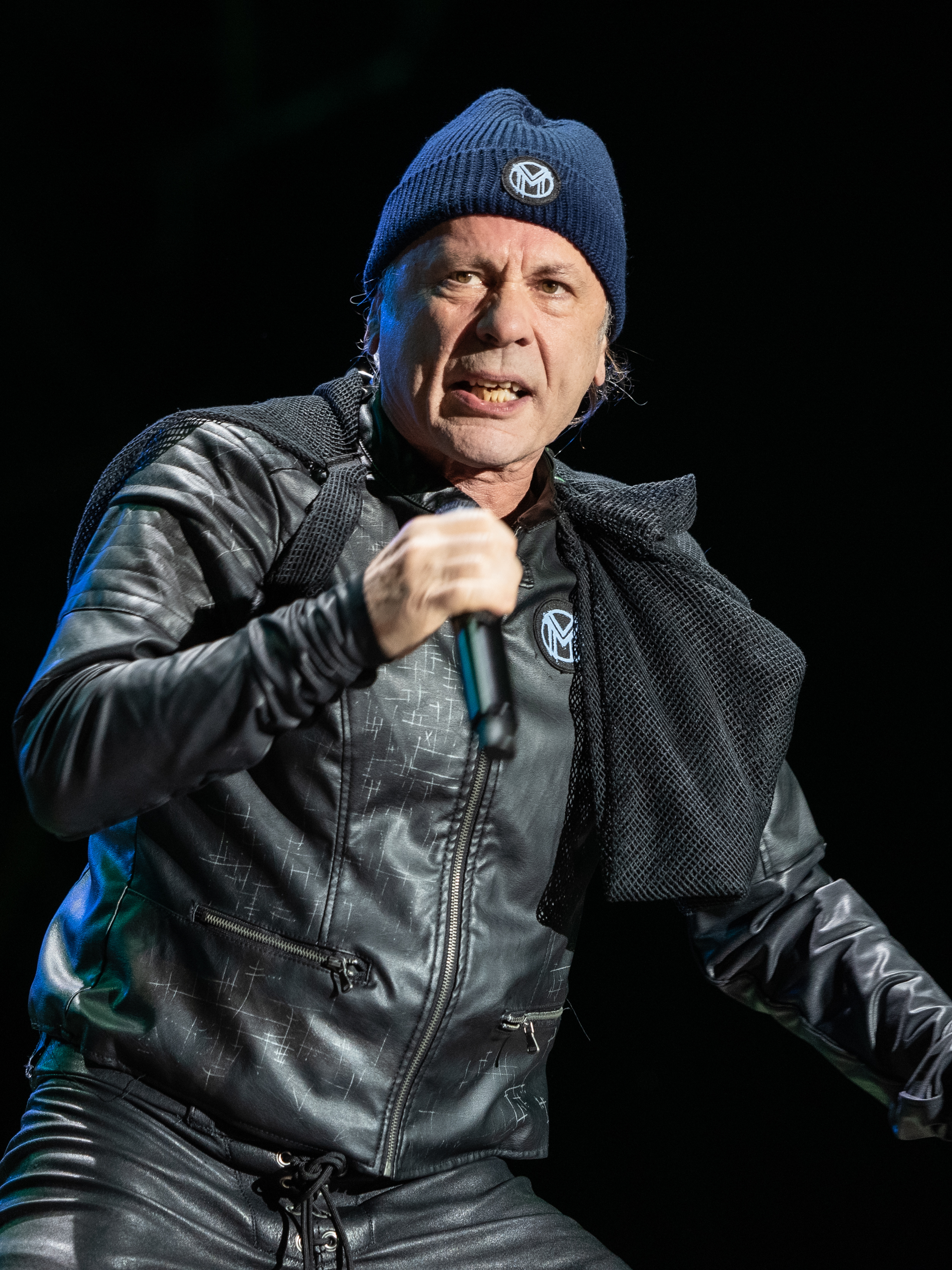
Dickinson performing in 2024

Paul Bruce Dickinson (born 7 August 1958) is an English heavy metal singer best known as the frontman of Iron Maiden. He has performed in the band across two stints, from 1981 to 1993 and from 1999 to the present day. He is known for his wide-ranging operatic vocal style and energetic stage presence.

Dickinson began his career in music fronting small pub bands in the 1970s while attending school in Sheffield and university in London. In 1979, he joined British new wave heavy metal band Samson, with whom he gained some popularity under the stage name "Bruce Bruce" and performed on two studio records. He left Samson in 1981 to join Iron Maiden, replacing Paul Di'Anno, and debuted on their 1982 album The Number of the Beast. During his first tenure in the band, they issued a series of US and UK platinum and gold albums in the 1980s and early 1990s.

Dickinson quit Iron Maiden in 1993 (being replaced by Blaze Bayley) to pursue his solo career, which saw him experiment with a wide variety of heavy metal and rock styles. He rejoined the band in 1999, along with guitarist Adrian Smith, and has released six subsequent studio albums with the band. Since his return to Iron Maiden, he has released two further solo records, in 2005, Tyranny of Souls and The Mandrake Project in 2024. His younger cousin, Rob Dickinson, is the former lead singer of British alternative rock band Catherine Wheel, while his son, Austin, fronted the metalcore band Rise to Remain. Since Bruce Dickinson joined Iron Maiden in 1981, the band has sold well over 100 million albums as of 2024.

Outside his career in music, Dickinson has pursued a number of other activities. He undertook a career as a commercial pilot for Astraeus Airlines, which led to a number of media-reported ventures such as captaining Iron Maiden's converted charter aeroplane, Ed Force One, during their world tours. Following Astraeus' closure, in 2012 he created his own aircraft maintenance and pilot training company, Cardiff Aviation. Dickinson presented his own radio show on BBC Radio 6 Music from 2002 to 2010, and has also hosted television documentaries, authored novels and film scripts, created a beer with Robinsons Brewery and competed at fencing internationally.

== Early life ==
Paul Bruce Dickinson was born on 7 August 1958 in Worksop, Nottinghamshire. His mother, Sonia, worked part-time in a shoe shop, and his father, Bruce, was a mechanic in the British Army. His birth hurried the young couple, who were then just teenagers, into marriage. Initially, he was brought up by his grandparents; his grandfather was a coal-face worker at the local colliery, and his grandmother was a housewife. This is referred to in his song "Born In '58" from the album Tattooed Millionaire. Dickinson started school at Manton Primary in Worksop while his parents moved away to Sheffield. Soon afterwards, when he was six, he was also despatched to Sheffield, where he attended a primary school in Manor Top. After six months, his parents decided to move him to a small private school called Sharrow Vale Junior. Due to constant moving, Dickinson states that this period of his life taught him to be self-reliant as he was unable to make close friends. Dickinson has a younger sister, professional showjumper Helena Stormanns, who was born in 1963. He tried to isolate himself from her as much as he could when he was young, supposedly out of spite because she, unlike him, was a planned pregnancy and birth.

Dickinson's first musical experience was dancing in his grandparents' front room to Chubby Checker's "The Twist", when he still lived with them in Worksop. The first record Dickinson recalls owning was the Beatles single "She Loves You", which he managed to persuade his grandfather to buy him, which made him more interested in music. He tried to play an acoustic guitar belonging to his father, but it blistered his fingers. By the time he moved to Sheffield, Dickinson's parents were earning a good living from buying property, refurbishing it and then selling it for a profit. As a result, much of Dickinson's childhood was spent living on a building site, until his parents bought a boarding house and a bankrupt garage where his father began selling second-hand cars. The income from their business success gave them the opportunity to give Dickinson—then 13 years old—a boarding school education and they chose Oundle, a public school in Northamptonshire. Dickinson was not opposed to moving away from home because he had not built "any real attachment" to his parents, having been raised by his grandparents in Worksop until he was six.

At Oundle, Dickinson was picked on and routinely bullied by the older boys of Sidney House, the boarding house that he belonged to, which he described as "like systematic torture" and meant that he became an outsider. His interests at Oundle were often military; he co-founded the school wargames society with Mike Jordan, and he joined the school's cadet force. This gave him access to live ammunition, which he used to create explosions as booby-traps. Oundle was where Dickinson became attracted to progressive rock and early heavy metal after hearing Deep Purple's "Speed King" being played in another student's room. As a result, the first album he ever bought was Deep Purple's In Rock, which created his interest in rock and metal music. After In Rock, he went on to buy Black Sabbath's debut, Jethro Tull's Aqualung and Tarkus by Emerson, Lake & Palmer. Every term, a band would play at the school, the first of these which Dickinson saw was called Wild Turkey, featuring former Jethro Tull bassist Glenn Cornick. After that, he saw Van der Graaf Generator and Arthur Brown.

Dickinson initially wanted to play the drums, later obtaining a pair of bongo drums from the music room for practice. He remembers playing "Let It Be" with his friend Mike Jordan, during which Dickinson discovered his singing voice while encouraging Jordan to sing the high-notes. Shortly afterwards Dickinson was expelled from Oundle for participating in a prank in which he allegedly urinated in the headmaster's dinner. Returning home to Sheffield in 1976, Dickinson enrolled at King Edward VII School, at which he joined his first band. He had overheard two other pupils talking about their band and that they needed a singer and so volunteered immediately. They rehearsed in the garage of the drummer's father, and the band were impressed by Dickinson's singing, encouraging him to buy his first microphone. Their first gig took place at the Broadfield Tavern in Sheffield. Originally called "Paradox", the band changed their name on Dickinson's suggestion to "Styx", unaware of the American act with the same name. They made local newspaper headlines when a steel worker was awoken by their performance and tried to smash the band's drum kit. Soon afterwards the band split up.

After leaving school with A-levels in English, History, and Economics, Dickinson confessed, "I didn't really know what I wanted to do." The first thing he did was join the Territorial Army for six months. Although he enjoyed his time in the TA, Dickinson realised that it was not a career choice, and so he applied for a place to read history at Queen Mary College, London. His parents wanted him in the army, but he told them that he wanted to get a degree first, which acted as his "cover story", and immediately began playing in bands. At university, Dickinson got involved in the Entertainments Committee: "one day you'd be a roadie for the Jam, the next you'd be putting up the Stonehenge backdrop for Hawkwind or whatever." In 1977, Dickinson met Paul "Noddy" White, a multi-instrumentalist who owned a public address system (PA) and other equipment, with whom Dickinson, along with drummer Steve Jones, would form a band together called Speed. According to Dickinson, the band was called Speed because of the way in which they played, rather than a reference to drug-taking. In Speed, Dickinson began writing his own material after White taught him how to play three chords on the guitar.

Although Speed would play several gigs at the Green Man pub in Plumstead, the band did not last long, but it encouraged Dickinson to continue to work towards being a musician. Dickinson spotted an advertisement in Melody Maker with the caption "Singer wanted for recording project" and replied immediately. He recorded a demo tape and sent it with a note which read: "By the way, if you think the singing's crap, there's some John Cleese stuff recorded on the other side you might find amusing." They liked what they heard and invited Dickinson down to the studio to make "Dracula", the first song he would ever record, with a band called "Shots", formed by two brothers, Phil and Doug Siviter. The song would later appear on the second disc of The Best of Bruce Dickinson compilation. The brothers were impressed with Dickinson's vocal abilities and asked him to join their group.

Dickinson played pubs with Shots on a regular basis to small audiences. One particular night, Dickinson suddenly stopped in the middle of a song and started interviewing a man in the audience, heckling for not paying enough attention. He got such a good response he started doing it every night until it became a regular routine used to catch the audience's attention. Dickinson states that this experience taught him how to be a frontman. The next step in Dickinson's career was taken in a pub called the Prince of Wales in Gravesend, Kent, where Shots were playing regularly, when Barry Graham ("Thunderstick") and Paul Samson paid a visit. Impressed with his stage-act, they talked with Dickinson afterwards and invited him to be their new singer. Dickinson agreed to join their band, Samson, but only once he'd finished taking his History finals two weeks later. Until that point, he had been neglecting his university education. As a result, the university had tried to expel him for failing his Second Year exams and not paying his accommodation fees, but he was saved because of his role as Entertainments Officer. After writing six months' worth of essays in the space of two weeks and some last minute cramming for his exams, Dickinson achieved a 2:2.

== Samson: 1979–1981 ==
"In my naïvety, I thought people who were in rock 'n' roll bands were great artists, and it was a huge shock to the system to realise that they weren't, that they didn't even aspire to be, really. Some of them did, maybe, but some of them, like Samson, were very frightened of the idea."

— Bruce Dickinson on his Samson band-mates.

After meeting Paul Samson and Barry Purkis at the Prince of Wales, and while still undertaking his final university exams, Dickinson joined Samson onstage at Bishop's Stortford to perform one of their songs, "Rock Me Baby", cementing his role as their new lead vocalist.

The band had already released their debut album, Survivors, in 1979 on an independent label, two months before Dickinson joined. Immediately following the completion of his University work, he met up with the band at Greenwich's Wood Wharf studios to learn the Survivors album. Although the tracks did not suit his vocal style, the band soon wrote the majority of the following Head On album in their earliest rehearsal sessions, some of which were immediately incorporated into their live set.

It was during these early rehearsals that the nickname "Bruce Bruce" came about, derived from Monty Python's "Bruces sketch". The name became very tiresome as the band's management continually wrote dud cheques, made payable to "Bruce Bruce", as a joke. Dickinson later commented that he did not like it but considered it "a sort of stage name" and accepted it.

Dickinson was dismayed to learn that not all rock performers were "great artists"; he felt that some, such as Samson, were only interested in women, drugs and alcohol, which he was unable to relate to. Although he had smoked joints before, Dickinson discovered that it was impossible to communicate with other band members if he was sober, deciding that it was "the price that had to be paid".

While fronting the band, Dickinson also came across Iron Maiden for the first time, who were supporting Samson at the Music Machine in 1980. As Dickinson recalls; "I was watching them, and they were good, really fucking good, and at that moment, I remember thinking, 'I wanna fucking sing for that band. In fact, I'm going to sing for that band! I know I'm going to sing for that band!' ... I just thought, 'This is really me. Not Samson.'"

Dickinson remained in the band for another year, recording two studio albums with them—Head On and Shock Tactics. However, Samson soon ran into difficulties with their record label, Gem, who went out of business and failed to finance their European tour in support of Iron Maiden. The band were turned over to RCA, which began neglecting the group, and so they promptly fired their management team and the resulting injunction meant that their equipment was reclaimed and they could not be paid for their concert performances. The band's last gig was at Reading Festival, after which Dickinson was approached by Iron Maiden's manager, Rod Smallwood, who asked him to audition to be their new lead vocalist.

== Iron Maiden ==
=== Beginnings and success: 1981–1985 ===
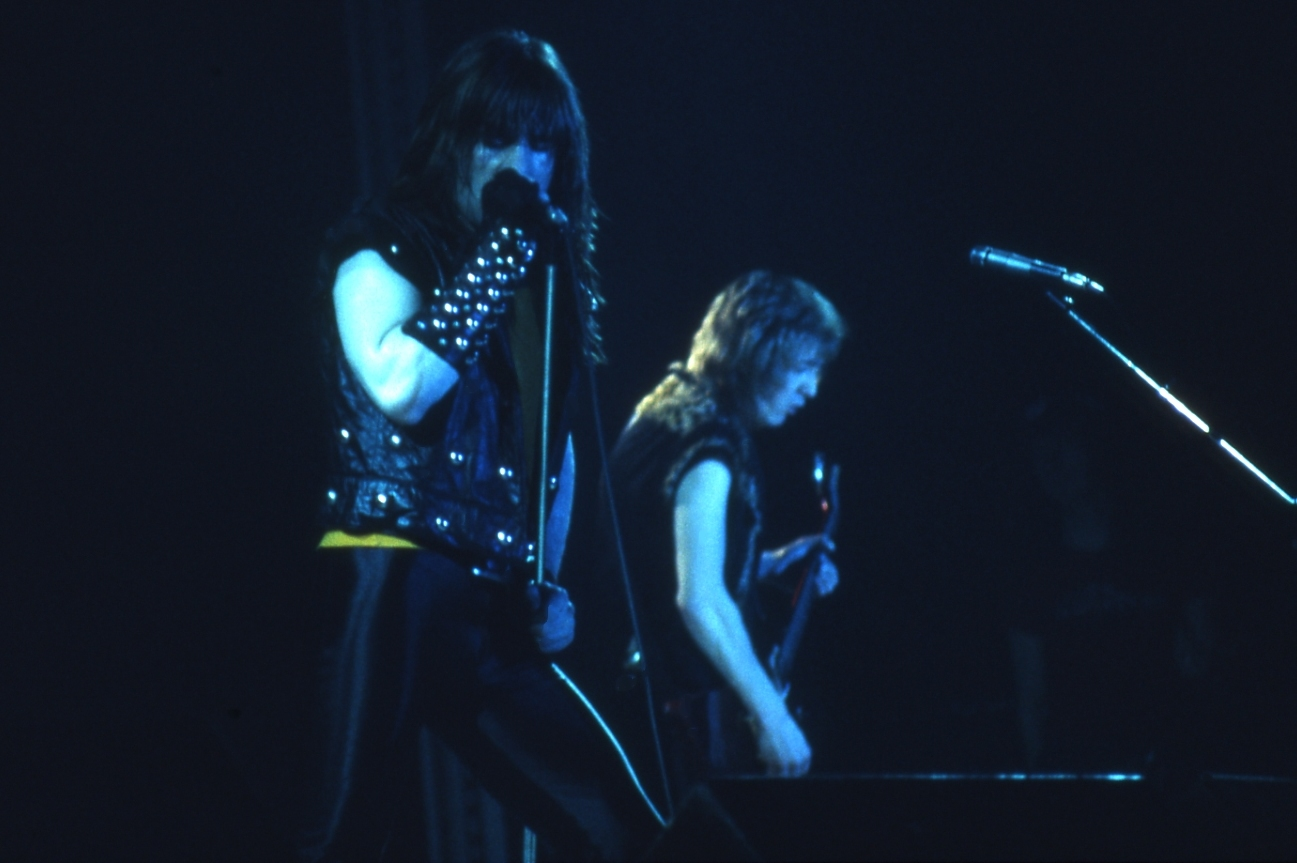
Dickinson, left, performing on his first world tour with Iron Maiden in 1982

Dickinson went to audition for Iron Maiden at a rehearsal room in Hackney in September 1981 and immediately discovered that this was a much more professional operation than he was used to with Samson. In the practice rooms, the band played through "Prowler", "Sanctuary", "Running Free" and "Remember Tomorrow", before asking Dickinson to sing the same songs again in a recording studio, and he was immediately inducted into the group.

Iron Maiden had a strict and organised routine that suited the band's writing style, which Dickinson described as a "time table". After a few gigs, they began writing new material for their third album, The Number of the Beast, released in 1982. In the wake of Samson's contractual problems, Dickinson could not legally be credited on any of the record's songs, having to make, what he called, a "moral contribution", later revealing that he had contributed to "The Prisoner", "Children of the Damned" and "Run to the Hills". In the documentary 12 Wasted Years, manager Rod Smallwood refers to "The Prisoner" as being co-written by Dickinson and Adrian Smith. The album was a major success, topping the British charts, and earning platinum status in the UK and the US. Following the release, the band embarked on a supporting tour around the globe.

"I guess it was the first time I really thought about leaving. I don't just mean Iron Maiden, I mean quitting music altogether. I just thought, 'Nothing is worth feeling like this for.' I began to feel like I was a piece of machinery, like I was part of the lighting rig."

— Bruce Dickinson on 1984–85's World Slavery Tour.

On the following albums, 1983's Piece of Mind and 1984's Powerslave, Steve Harris's song-writing monopoly was pushed aside in favour of other members' ideas, with Dickinson contributing to a number of tracks, including the singles "Flight of Icarus" and "2 Minutes to Midnight". Throughout the World Slavery Tour, as part of the new theatrical elements incorporated into the band's stage-show, Dickinson wore a feathered mask during "Powerslave". This was the band's longest tour to date, during which Dickinson considered going home mid-tour, due to the high number of shows. Iron Maiden's management were continually adding dates, until Dickinson demanded that they stop or he would leave the group.

=== Growing tensions and departure: 1986–1993 ===
After a six-month break, which Dickinson mostly spent practising fencing, Iron Maiden began writing their next album, Somewhere in Time. Dickinson was disappointed with the effort as he felt that the band needed a more dramatic stylistic departure from records to remain relevant, despite its introduction of synthesised bass and guitars. He has no writing credits on the release, as his material, based on his own suggestion that the album should be more acoustic-focused, was rejected by the rest of the band. Steve Harris, on the other hand, stated that his material was rejected because it was not good enough, and that Dickinson "was probably more burnt out than anyone at the end of the last tour".

After a subsequent tour, Iron Maiden started working on their next studio effort, Seventh Son of a Seventh Son, which featured more progressive rock elements than the band's previous records. Although it became their second release to top the British charts, it was also Dickinson's first album with the band that did not achieve platinum status in the US. Unlike Somewhere in Time, Dickinson was much more enthusiastic about this album due to its concept and has several song-writing credits. After the following tour in 1988, the band decided to take a year off.

"I thought it wouldn't be a problem to go out and do the shows at all ... but it wasn't a good vibe ... we walked out onstage and it was like a morgue. The Maiden fans knew I'd quit, they knew these were the last gigs, and I suddenly realised that, as the frontman, you're in an almost impossible situation. If you're like, 'Wow, this is really fucking cool tonight, man,' they're all gonna sit there going, 'What a wanker. He's leaving. How can it be cool?' Or do you go on and say, 'Look, I'm really sorry I'm leaving – not to put a damper on the evening, but I am quitting'? I mean, what do you do?"

— Dickinson on his farewell tour with Iron Maiden.

During the next album's writing stage, Adrian Smith left Iron Maiden, and was replaced by Janick Gers. Iron Maiden's eighth studio release, 1990's No Prayer for the Dying, had a raw sound that, according to a retrospective assessment by AllMusic, did not "hold up well" compared to past efforts, as it was recorded in a barn which Steve Harris owned, with a mobile studio owned by the Rolling Stones. The record featured Dickinson's "Bring Your Daughter... to the Slaughter", originally composed for a film soundtrack, which despite receiving a Golden Raspberry Award for worst original song in 1989, became the band's first and only single to top the UK singles chart. By 1992, Harris had converted his barn into a proper studio, and the new album, Fear of the Dark, was recorded there, resulting in a better overall sound than No Prayer for the Dying, although Dickinson still says it had limitations due to its size.

After the Fear of the Dark Tour, Dickinson decided to leave Iron Maiden to concentrate on his solo career. At that point the band had already booked a following tour in 1993, which Dickinson did not enjoy. Throughout the tour, Dickinson drew a lot of criticism from his bandmates, with Steve Harris in particular saying, "I really wanted to kill him." According to Harris, Dickinson would only perform when the press was there, whereas at other concerts he would only mumble his way through songs. Dickinson has since denied the accusations that he was deliberately under-performing, arguing that it was impossible to give a decent performance some nights because of the atmosphere. His last performance with the band on 28 August 1993 was filmed by the BBC at Pinewood Studios and released as a live video the following year, titled Raising Hell.

=== Return: 1999–present ===
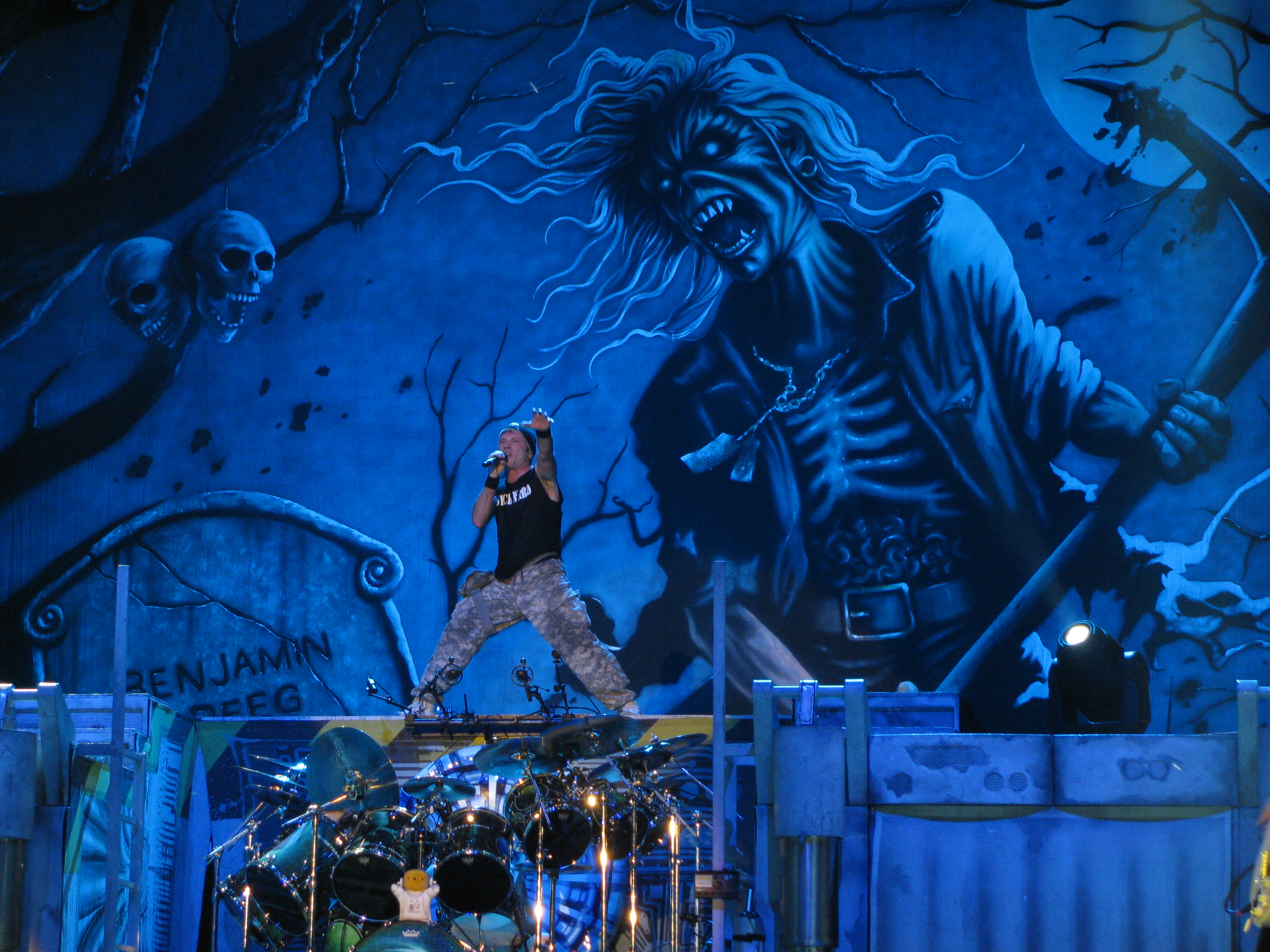
Performing on 6 July 2010 during The Final Frontier World Tour. The 2010 leg consisted primarily of material released since Dickinson's return to Iron Maiden in 1999.

Along with Adrian Smith, Dickinson rejoined Iron Maiden in 1999 with Janick Gers remaining in the band, after he was approached by manager Rod Smallwood. Smallwood also spoke to Steve Harris about Dickinson's return, who initially had reservations about the prospect, but soon came round to the idea, deliberating that they knew of his abilities and that it was a case of "better the devil you know". Harris and Dickinson agreed to meet at Smallwood's home in Brighton in January 1999 for the first conversation they would have with each other since 1993. Although both men were nervous about the encounter, upon seeing each other the tension immediately dissipated and both agreed that Dickinson should return to the group.

After embarking on a small tour, the band set about recording Brave New World, their first studio album with Dickinson since 1992. Dickinson insisted that they find a replacement for the now retired Martin Birch, the band's regular producer, and record in a different studio than the one in which they made No Prayer for the Dying and Fear of the Dark, to which Harris agreed. The album was recorded at Guillaume Tell Studios, Paris with producer Kevin Shirley, after which Iron Maiden undertook a supporting tour culminating with a performance at the Rock in Rio festival before a crowd of 250,000.

In 2003, they recorded and released Dance of Death at London's SARM Studios with Kevin Shirley, now the band's new regular producer. After two further stints on the road (Dance of Death World Tour and Eddie Rips Up the World Tour) Iron Maiden returned to SARM in 2006 to record their next studio album, A Matter of Life and Death, and embarked on a supporting tour. In 2008 and 2009, the band set out on the Somewhere Back in Time World Tour, which has since been described as "groundbreaking" for its use of Ed Force One, the band's customised Boeing 757, flown by Dickinson himself, and led to the documentary film Iron Maiden: Flight 666, which had a limited cinema release in April 2009. Iron Maiden held another world tour in 2010 and 2011 in support of The Final Frontier, their first album recorded at Compass Point Studios, Nassau, Bahamas since 1986's Somewhere in Time, and which peaked at No. 1 in 28 countries. The song "El Dorado" also won the band a Grammy award for "Best Metal Performance".

In September 2014, Iron Maiden began recording their sixteenth studio album, The Book of Souls, at Guillaume Tell Studios, Paris. The release features two songs written solely by Dickinson for the first time since Powerslave, "If Eternity Should Fail" and "Empire of the Clouds", the former originally penned for a possible solo record. "Empire of the Clouds" is the band's longest ever song, at over 18 minutes in length, and features Dickinson on piano for the first time, which is how the song was written. The band toured the album in 2016, during which Dickinson once again piloted the band's private plane, Ed Force One (now a Boeing 747-400 jumbo jet). In 2018 the band embarked on the Legacy of the Beast World Tour which lasted all the way till 2022. During this period they also released their seventeenth and most recent album Senjutsu which was a critical and commercial success peaking at No.1 in 33 countries. The band went on The Future Past World Tour in support of the album.

Ozzfest incident

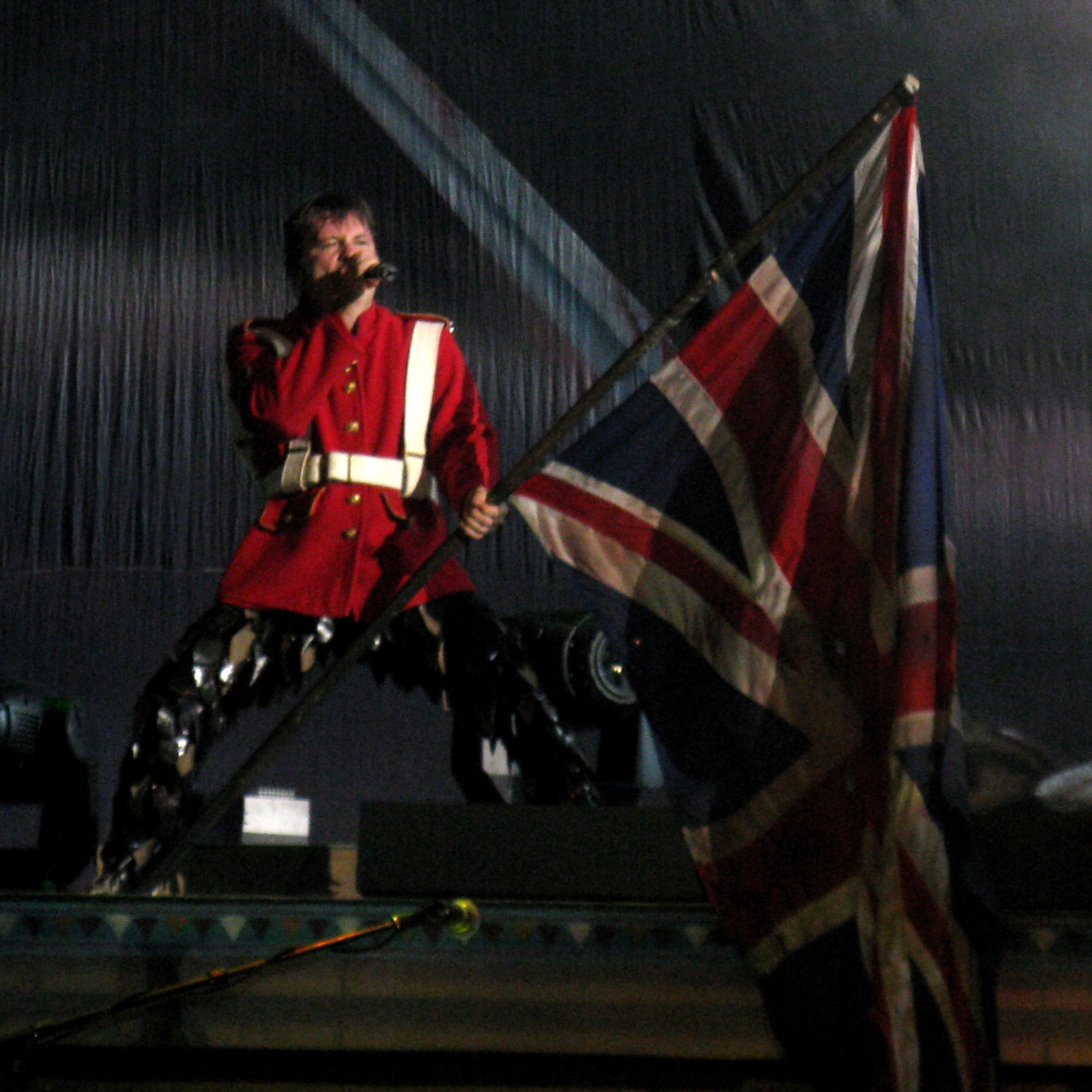
Performing "The Trooper" with Iron Maiden in Paris, 1 July 2008. Dickinson has always waved a Union Flag during live renditions of the song.

In 2005, Iron Maiden co-headlined the US festival tour, Ozzfest, with Black Sabbath. Lead singer Ozzy Osbourne's wife, Sharon, encouraged family friends and members of other bands to sabotage Iron Maiden's last performance at Hyundai Pavilion in San Bernardino, California, on 20 August, in an attack which Rod Smallwood criticised as "vile, dangerous, criminal and cowardly", as well as disrespectful to fans who had paid to see the band perform "a full unhindered performance". Osbourne ordered interference with the band's PA, delayed the entrance of Eddie, the band's mascot, and encouraged members of the Osbourne camp to throw eggs, lighters and bottle tops from the front of the audience. According to Dickinson, the attack was in response to his "disparaging remarks about reality TV shows that she took personally", although The Guardian reported that he slated the Osbournes' reality series and accused Ozzy Osbourne of using a teleprompter. Dickinson has since denied making comments against Ozzy Osbourne and Black Sabbath, but admitted that he criticised Ozzfest throughout the tour, attacking their "corporate" seating layout and saying, "Most of the bands are there because they paid to be there."

Following the concert at San Bernardino, Osbourne released a further statement which accused Dickinson of making several anti-American comments, for which Classic Rock stated that "nobody can present any cast-iron evidence". In addition, Osbourne claimed that the flag-waving during "The Trooper" was disrespectful to American troops, at the time fighting alongside the British in Iraq, even though Dickinson had always held a Union Flag during the song, being based on the Battle of Balaclava during the Crimean War. It was also reported that Steve Harris had spoken to Ozzy Osbourne in San Bernardino, apologising for Dickinson's comments, which Harris denies, stating that his words had been "twisted".

July 2022 Athens concert incident

Dickinson has publicly reprimanded fans at Iron Maiden concerts if he feels they are out of line. One such incident occurred during the band's Legacy of the Beast Tour concert at the Olympic Stadium in Athens on 16 July 2022, when Dickinson used offensive language to attack the nationality of a Greek fan who had lit up a flare as the frontman was about to sing "The Number of the Beast".

In February 2024, Dickinson admitted in an interview for the Greek magazine Rock Hard that he had lost his temper when asked about his reaction to the flare at the Athens 2022 concert.

== Solo career ==
In early 1989, Zomba asked Dickinson to produce a track for the movie A Nightmare on Elm Street 5: The Dream Child, providing a budget, a studio, and a producer, Chris Tsangarides. Dickinson took up the opportunity and called an old friend of his, former Gillan guitarist, Janick Gers, and, shortly after meeting up, they had "Bring Your Daughter to the Slaughter" ready for the studio, then recorded with the assistance of bassist Andy Carr, and drummer Fabio del Rio. "I wrote it in about three minutes", states Dickinson, "I don't know where the title 'Bring Your Daughter to the Slaughter' came from, but it just popped into my head. I thought, 'Bloody hell, straight out of AC/DC!' And I thought, 'Nightmare on Elm Street. Yeah, that'll do.' Impressed with the results, Zomba asked Dickinson if he was willing to record a whole album as well. With the same line-up and producer, Dickinson's solo debut, Tattooed Millionaire, was written and recorded within two weeks, and released in May 1990, followed by a supporting tour.

Later that year, Dickinson participated on a re-recording of Deep Purple's "Smoke on the Water", as part of the humanitarian effort Rock Aid Armenia. Backed by the band Skin, he produced a cover version of Alice Cooper's "Elected", along with Rowan Atkinson (in character as Mr. Bean), which was used in 1992 for Comic Relief, and five years later, on Bean Soundtrack.

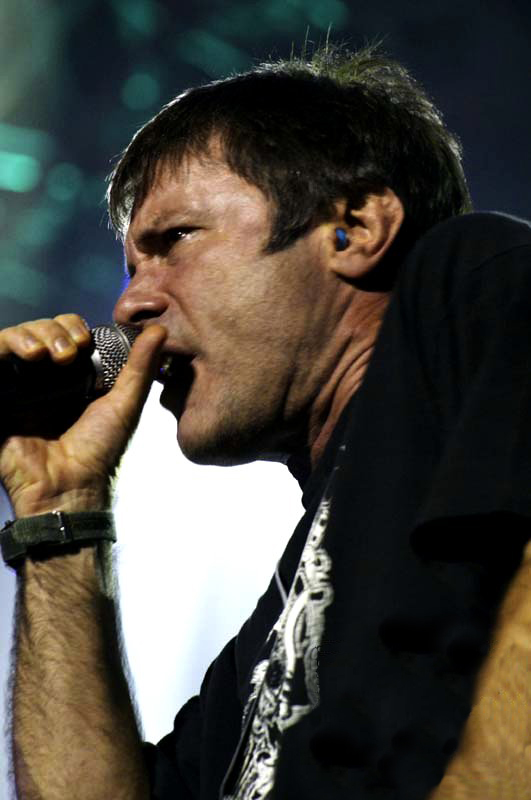
Dickinson performing with Tribuzy in São Paulo, 11 November 2005. The performance was recorded for a live album, titled Execution – Live Reunion.

For his second solo effort, Dickinson received the collaboration of American producer, Keith Olsen, and, while working on the record in LA, decided to leave Iron Maiden. Unhappy with the direction he was taking with Olsen, Dickinson began working with Tribe of Gypsies guitarist Roy Z and started the album again from scratch. Balls to Picasso was recorded with Tribe of Gypsies as the backing band, and was released in 1994. That same year, Dickinson recorded a cover version of "Sabbath Bloody Sabbath" with the band Godspeed for Black Sabbath's tribute album Nativity in Black. Tribe of Gypsies departed to work on their own material and Dickinson tracked down another band, including his new writing partner and guitarist, Alex Dickson. While touring with this new outfit in 1994, Dickinson performed in Sarajevo, then under siege during the Bosnian War; a documentary film based on the concert, titled Scream For Me Sarajevo, completed filming in December 2015.

After the Balls to Picasso supporting tour finished, he started working on a new studio record, Skunkworks. Dickinson decided that Skunkworks would be the title of the band as well, but the record company refused to release the album without his name on the cover. Dickinson hired producer Jack Endino, most noted for producing the first Nirvana album. The "Skunkworks" entity ceased to be when the tour ended. "I was devastated by the Skunkworks thing", stated Dickinson. "Skunkworks was a record which I tore myself apart to make and nobody seemed to give a shit."

After a short period of inactivity, Dickinson once again teamed up with Roy Z and Tribe of Gypsies to record his next album, Accident of Birth; "It was actually Roy that dragged me back into some assemblance, because he called up and he said, 'Listen, I've got some stuff and it's like a metal record.' And I wasn't thrilled, I wasn't really sure that I had anything to offer ... Then he played me some backing-tracks he'd done for what was to become Accident of Birth down the phone and I thought 'There is something there.'" Former Iron Maiden guitarist, Adrian Smith, was asked to guest on the record, but remained as a full-time member of Dickinson's solo outfit. The album marked a return to heavy metal for Dickinson, with Sputnikmusic remarking, "The album's heavy feel is very satisfying, and definitely fills that void left by Maiden during the 90's." The follow-up, The Chemical Wedding, was a semi-concept album on alchemy, which drew inspiration from William Blake's writings; with some songs, such as "Book of Thel", having the same title as some of his poems, and the cover artwork featuring one of his paintings. The record was even more successful than its predecessor, with Sputnikmusic commenting: "Bruce had shattered all expectations to create an album that might even be better than the previous one." During The Chemical Wedding's supporting tour, the live album, Scream for Me Brazil was recorded in São Paulo, after which Dickinson and Smith returned to Iron Maiden in February 1999.

In 2000, Dickinson performed vocals on the song "Into the Black Hole" for Ayreon's Universal Migrator Part 2: Flight of the Migrator. Later that year, he collaborated with Judas Priest front-man Rob Halford, recording "The One You Love to Hate", for Halford's debut, Resurrection. A compilation, titled The Best of Bruce Dickinson, was released in late 2001, including two new songs and a bonus disc of rarities. His sixth solo album, Tyranny of Souls, was released in May 2005. This time the song-writing was split between Roy Z and Dickinson and many songs were composed by Z sending recordings of riffs to Dickinson while he was on tour with Iron Maiden. On 21 June 2005, Dickinson's complete solo discography was re-released, featuring bonus discs with rare and remastered tracks. That same year, Dickinson contributed to the song "Beast in the Light" from Tribuzy's album Execution and their subsequent live album. A three-DVD box set, titled Anthology, was released on 19 June 2006, containing concerts and promo videos from throughout his solo career, as well as an old Samson video, titled "Biceps of Steel".

A fan of the Monty Python comedy troupe, in 2009 Dickinson appeared in Monty Python: Almost the Truth (Lawyers Cut). He also recorded a new version of the theme song from Monty Python's Life of Brian for the sixth and final episode. In December 2017, Dickinson said that he has tentative plans for his next solo album to be "a whole concept album", with the title being If Eternity Should Fail, the same song name from Iron Maiden's album The Book of Souls, in which he confirmed that it was originally penned as a solo track. "So if I did do another solo album, which I think I will, I might just stick to my original plan and have that as the title track. I mean, I did write it – it was the first track that I wrote for it. So, yeah, I'd probably still include that song. But it would be... the feel would be slightly different – not very much, though – from the Maiden version." Dickinson released The Mandrake Project, his first solo studio album in 19 years, in March 2024. It was produced by Roy Z. The record saw commercial success and peaked in the top 10 in multiple countries and No.1 in German and Austria. It also received critical success. Blabbermouth.net stated: "The Mandrake Project" is magnificent, mandatory listening for fans of heavy metal."

In June 2025 Dickinson released a remaster of his 1994 album Balls to Picasso called More Balls to Picasso. The record also included previously unreleased live in-the-studio tracks 'Gods of War' and 'Shoot All the Clowns'. Dickinson also embarked on his first solo North American tour in 30 years in support of his album The Mandrake Project, which went from August to October. He also announced that he will begin recording his new album, which he plans to have finished by 2027.

He announced in November 2026 that his new album titled Psychogod, would be released in March 2027. The first single, 'Speaking In Tongues', was released on the 18 November 2026.

== Solo band members ==
Current members

- Chris Declercq – guitar, backing vocals (2024–present)
- Philip Naslund – guitar, backing vocals (2024–present)
- Tanya O'Callaghan – bass, backing vocals (2024–present)
- Dave Moreno – drums, backing vocals (2024–present)
- Mistheria – keytar, backing vocals (2024–present)

== Personal life ==
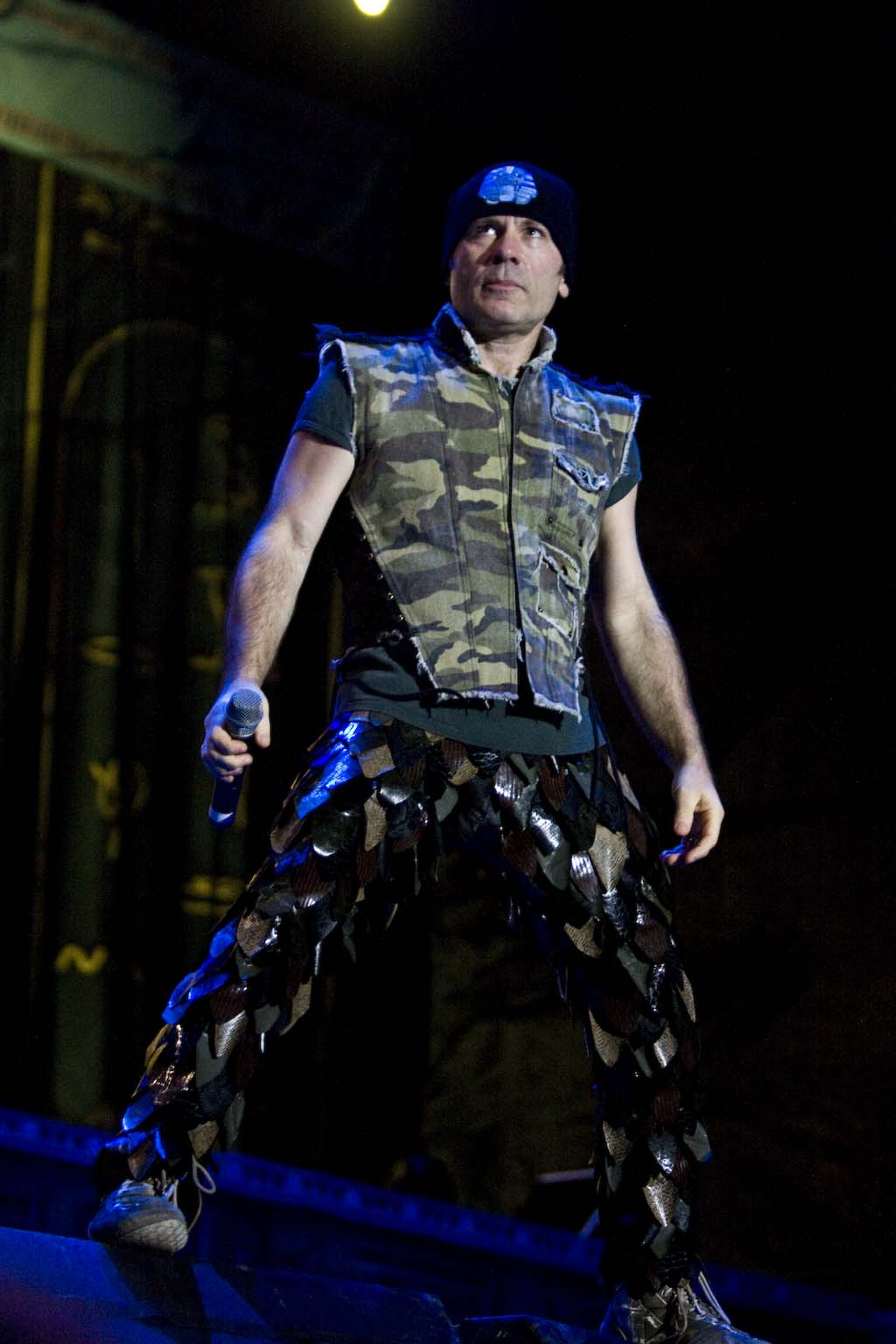
Dickinson performing live on the Somewhere Back in Time World Tour in 2008

Dickinson married Erica "Jane" Barnett in 1984 and they divorced in 1987. With his second wife, psychotherapist Patrice "Paddy" Bowden, he has three children. All three were born in the Chiswick area of London, where Dickinson lived for a few decades beginning in 1981. In 2020, it was reported that he and Bowden had separated earlier after almost 30 years of marriage. She died in an accident at her home in May 2020. As of December 2023 Dickinson lives in Paris with his wife Leana Dolci whom he married in late 2023.

Dickinson's son Austin was the lead singer in metalcore band Rise to Remain until their break-up in 2015, at which point he formed the alternative metal group As Lions. His other son Griffin, who previously worked as a stage carpenter for Iron Maiden during their tours, was the lead singer of melodic hardcore band SHVPES. Dickinson's cousin, Rob Dickinson, was the lead singer of alternative rock band Catherine Wheel and founded the American company Singer Vehicle Design.

In an interview with Sarah Montague for BBC's HARDtalk in 2012, Dickinson agreed that he is a conservative and a Eurosceptic. Dickinson said in a 2018 interview with French magazine L'Obs that, despite residing mainly in France, he supported Brexit and voted for the UK to leave the EU during the 2016 referendum. In 2021, after the Withdrawal Agreement entered into force, Dickinson said he was angry that British musicians and performers were restricted from free travel through Europe.

In 2015, Dickinson underwent seven weeks of chemotherapy and radiation therapy for a cancerous tumour found at the back of his tongue. Dickinson's medical team expected him to make a full recovery as the tumour was discovered in the early stages. On 15 May, Dickinson was given the all-clear by his specialists.

== Honours ==
On 19 July 2011, Dickinson was presented with an honorary music doctorate from his alma mater, Queen Mary University of London, in honour of his contribution to the music industry.

In 2019, Dickinson was made an honorary citizen of Sarajevo and received the city's prestigious Sixth April Award for his efforts in performing under siege in 1994. According to the city's mayor, it was his arrival in Sarajevo that "was one of those moments that made us realize that we will survive, that the city of Sarajevo will survive, that Bosnia and Herzegovina will survive". He is also credited as a producer on the critically acclaimed 2016 documentary Scream for Me Sarajevo, which chronicles this performance and his return to Sarajevo.

In 2019, Dickinson was also presented with an honorary doctorate from the Faculty of Philosophy by the University of Helsinki.

On 6 January 2020, Dickinson was made an Honorary Group Captain of 601 (County of London) Squadron RAF.

In 2024, Dickinson was made an honorary citizen of Curitiba City, Brazil.

== Other work ==
Dickinson's interests and non-musical activities include writing, broadcasting, fencing (at which he has competed internationally, placing 7th in Great Britain, and has founded a fencing equipment company under the brand name "Duellist"), beer brewing and aviation. Due to the wide variety of Dickinson's pursuits, Intelligent Life named him as a living example of a polymath in 2009.

=== Aviation and entrepreneurship ===
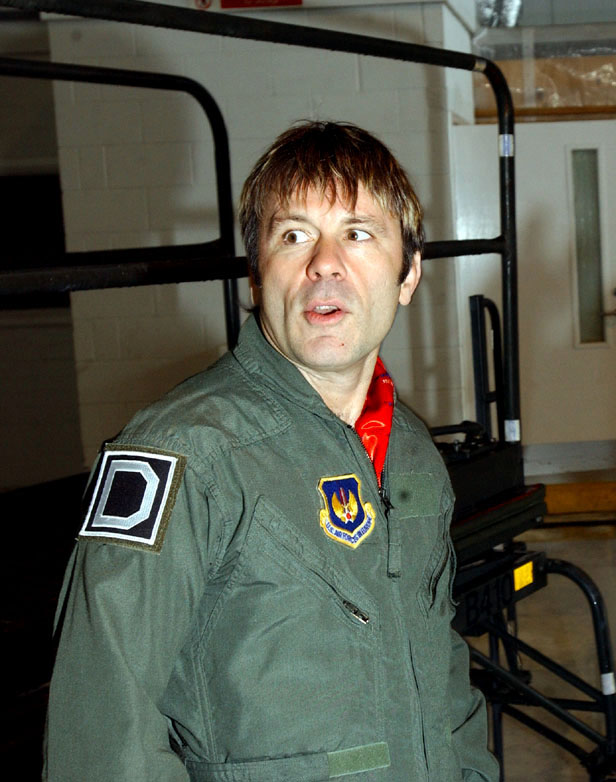
Dickinson in a flight suit while filming Flying Heavy Metal

Dickinson learned to fly recreationally in Florida in the 1990s and now holds an airline transport pilot's licence. He regularly flew Boeing 757s in his role as captain for the now-defunct British charter airline Astraeus, which, from 16 September 2010, employed him as marketing director. One of his key roles in that position was to promote Astraeus' services by increasing their number of videos, leading to the Civil Aviation Authority releasing a video featuring Dickinson on aircraft loading safety in June 2011.

Following Astraeus' closure on 21 November 2011, Dickinson branched into entrepreneurship when he launched Cardiff Aviation Ltd on 1 May 2012, an aircraft maintenance business based at the Twin Peaks Hangar in St Athan, Vale of Glamorgan. According to The Wall Street Journal, in January 2013 Cardiff Aviation had created 40 jobs and hoped to have over a hundred personnel by the summer of 2013. In June 2013, The Daily Telegraph reported that the business had expanded to between 60 and 70 employees and were in discussions to set up their own airline. In August 2015, Cardiff Aviation signed a deal to provide airline support to Air Djibouti, for whom Dickinson piloted their maiden flight the following year, a Boeing 737 from Cardiff to Djibouti. As a result of his business ventures, Dickinson delivered keynote speeches at events around the globe, including Queen Mary University of London's Innovation Showcase in November 2012, Connect2Business, Stockholm in March 2013, Aviation Week's MRO Europe Conference, London in October 2015 and "Blog Now, Live Forever", Mumbai in October 2015.

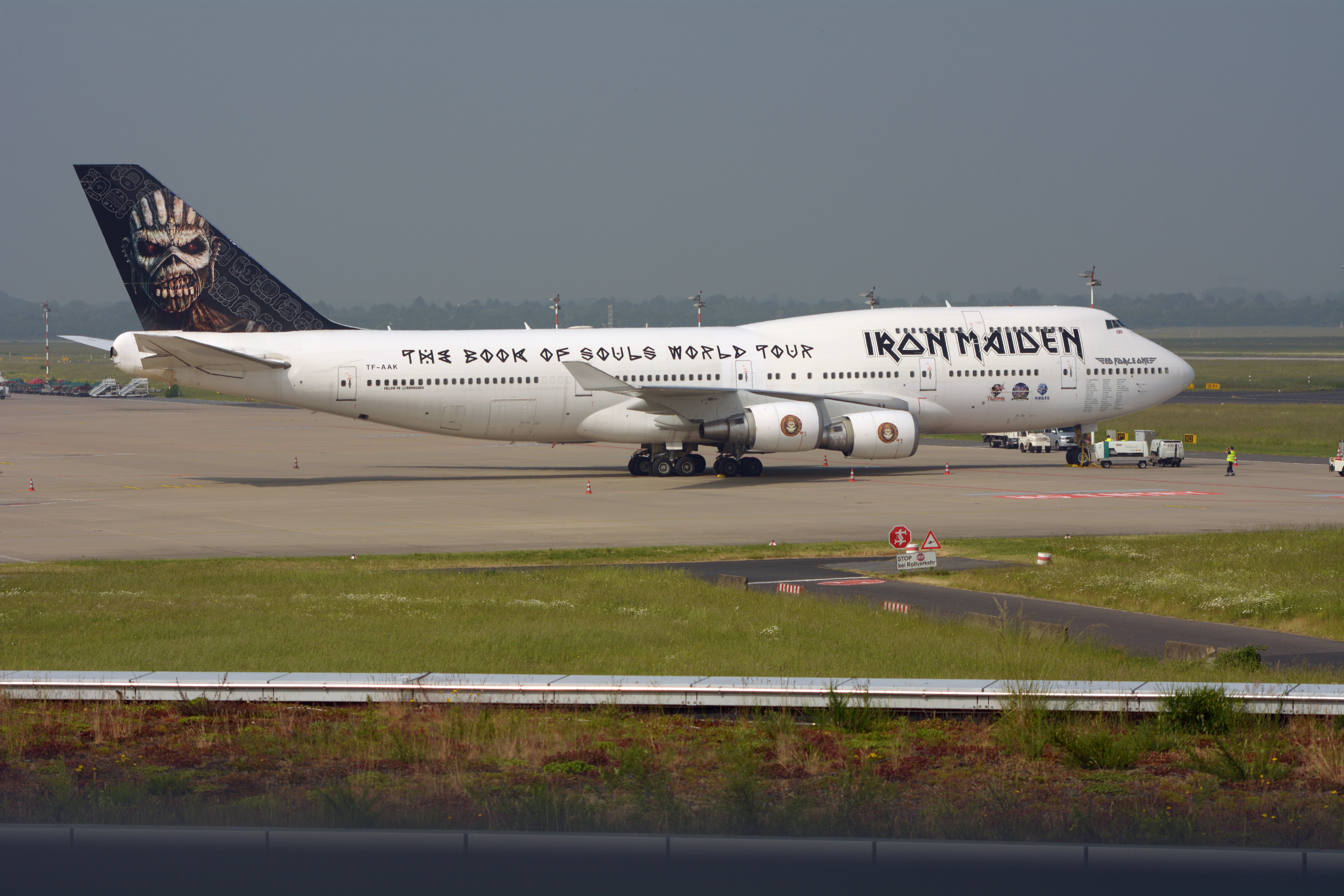
Iron Maiden's Boeing 747-400, Ed Force One, as used during The Book of Souls World Tour in 2016

Dickinson's role as a pilot has led to some high-profile flights, which include returning a group of RAF pilots from Afghanistan in 2008, 200 British citizens from Lebanon during the Israel/Hezbollah conflict in 2006, and 180 stranded holiday makers from Egypt following the collapse of XL Airways UK in September 2008. In addition, he flew Rangers F.C. and Liverpool F.C. to away matches in Israel and Italy in 2007 and 2010, respectively.

For the 2008–09 "Somewhere Back in Time World Tour", he piloted Iron Maiden's chartered Boeing 757, dubbed "Ed Force One", specially converted to carry the band's equipment between continents, which subsequently led to a documentary film, Iron Maiden: Flight 666. Dickinson flew "Ed Force One" again for "The Final Frontier World Tour" in 2011. For the 2016 The Book of Souls World Tour, the band upgraded to a Boeing 747-400 jumbo jet, which meant that Dickinson had to undertake type conversion to fly the aircraft. In 2014, Dickinson purchased a Fokker Dr.I triplane replica G-CDXR and joined the Great War Display Team, which re-enacts First World War air battles at air shows across the UK. In 2024 Dickinson guessed that he has roughly 7,500 hours of total flight time.

=== Radio and TV ===
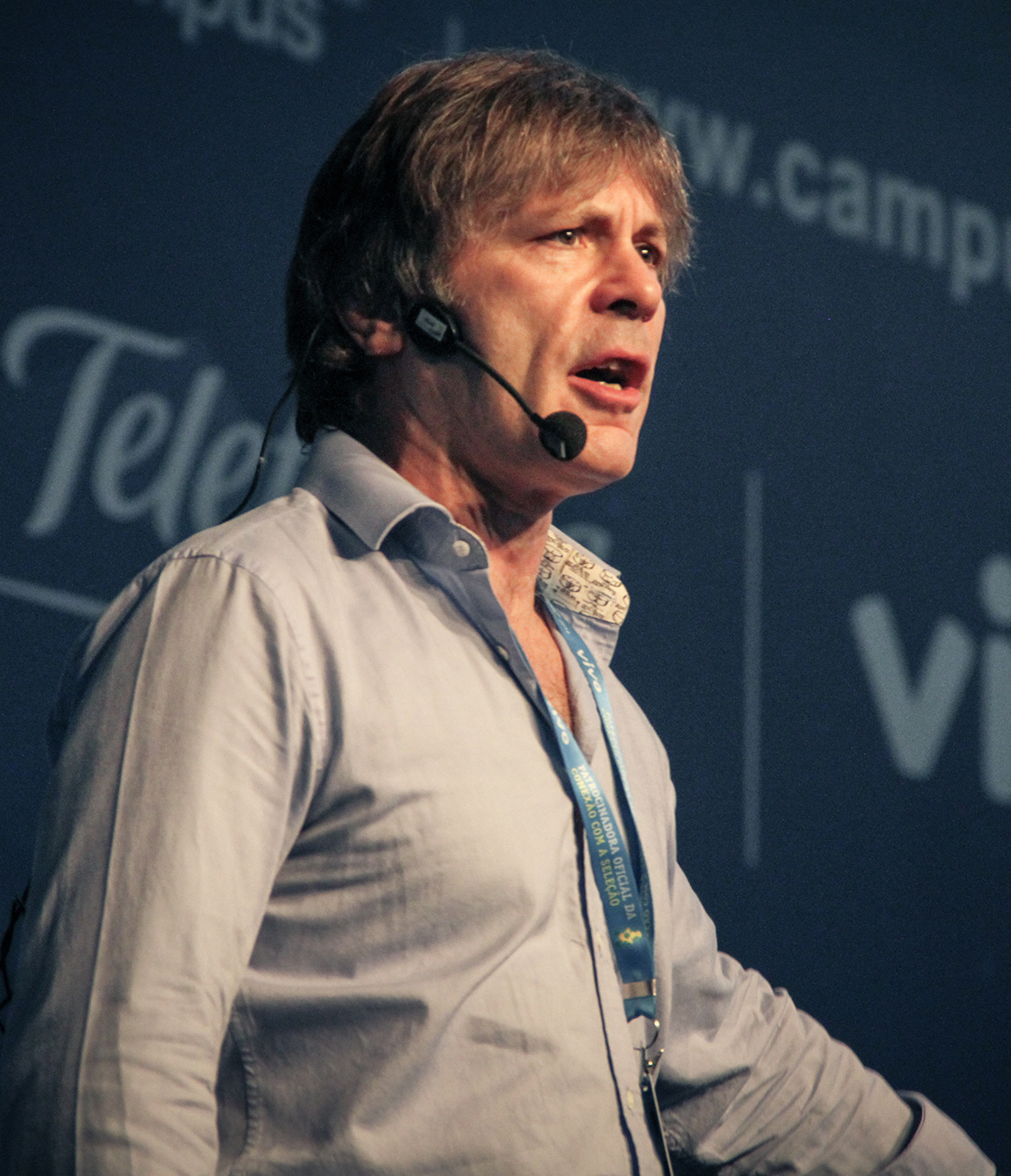
Dickinson in 2014

Dickinson presented Bruce Dickinson's Friday Rock Show on BBC Radio 6 Music from 2002 to 2010. In March 2010, the BBC announced that, after over eight years, Dickinson's show was to be axed. His final broadcast was on 28 May 2010, with the regular format abandoned in favour of a personal and musical tribute to the recently deceased Ronnie James Dio. Dickinson scorned BBC executives for the cancellation, playing the Johnny Paycheck version of "Take This Job and Shove It". In addition to his show on 6 Music, Dickinson also hosted a series titled Masters of Rock on BBC Radio 2 from 2003 to 2007. Dickinson's catalogue of 6 Music programmes were acquired in 2014 by TeamRock radio, who began re-broadcasting episodes in December.

In 2005, Dickinson hosted a five-part historical TV series about aviation, Flying Heavy Metal, shown on the Discovery Channel and later on Discovery Turbo in the UK. He was a guest on an episode of the Military Channel's The Greatest Ever, where he drove a Russian T-34 tank. In 2006, Dickinson presented a documentary for Sky One called Inside Spontaneous Human Combustion with Bruce Dickinson, in which he investigated the phenomenon by enlisting the help of several experts and performing various experiments to determine its possible cause. Other television appearances include guesting on quiz shows such as Never Mind the Buzzcocks and the short-lived Space Cadets, as well as the chat show Clarkson, hosted by Jeremy Clarkson. Dickinson has also appeared in a BBC series called The Paradise Club, undertaking the role of a musician named Jake Skinner. On 27 July 2012, Dickinson spent a day being filmed as a guest star for a season four episode of Ice Pilots NWT, in which he flew a Douglas DC-3 and took part in "touch-and-go drills" in a Douglas DC-4 with Buffalo Airways.

=== Writing ===
"I always fancied the idea of writing a book, and I was bored on the road, so I sat down and started at page one! I had an idea for this character called Lord Iffy Boatrace, who's an upper class chinless wonder. I wrote it the same way I write a song. Write the first note, and don't know what the second one's going to be. About halfway through you suddenly realise what it is you're writing about."

— Dickinson on writing his first novel

During a 1986–1987 Iron Maiden tour, and in the wake of a divorce, Dickinson started writing his first book. Inspired by the novels of Tom Sharpe, in addition to Biggles and Penthouse, he created The Adventures of Lord Iffy Boatrace, which Kerrang! describes as "a satirical swipe at fetishism among the upper classes", and whose title character is a "semi-transvestite" British land owner.

Following its completion, Dickinson approached Sidgwick & Jackson, who, according to Dickinson, agreed to publish the book before reading it, solely based on Iron Maiden's album sales. Released in 1990 (ISBN 0-283-06043-3), the novel sold more than 40,000 copies almost immediately. Due to the high demand, Sidgwick & Jackson asked Dickinson to produce a sequel, which became 1992's The Missionary Position (ISBN 0-283-06092-1), a satire of televangelism. No further additions to the series have been published, although Dickinson did write the first 60 pages to a prequel, set during "Lord Iffy's schooldays", which he "just thought was rubbish and ripped it all up. I didn't think it was funny."

Dickinson also turned his hand to scriptwriting, co-authoring Chemical Wedding with director Julian Doyle. The film, in which Dickinson played a few small cameo roles and composed the soundtrack, was released in 2008 and starred Simon Callow.

On 15 October 2015, HarperCollins and Dey Street announced that they would publish Dickinson's memoirs. What Does This Button Do? was released on 19 October 2017.

=== Beer ===
In 2013, Iron Maiden collaborated with Robinsons Brewery in Stockport to create Trooper, a 4.8% cask/4.7% bottled ale whose recipe Dickinson formulated with head brewer Martyn Weeks. As of May 2014, the beer has sold 2.5 million pints in 40 countries, making it Robinsons' most successful export.

Following Trooper's success, Dickinson, a fan of traditional English cask beer, stated that he intends to develop more beers in the future, although new products will be "under the umbrella of Trooper and not Iron Maiden [as] Trooper has taken on a life of its own. People drink it because they like the beer, not because they are Maiden fans." Additional beers have included Trooper Red 'N' Black Porter (5.8 per cent ABV), Trooper Hallowed (6.0 per cent ABV), and a limited-edition "666" (at 6.66 per cent ABV).

In 2023, Dickinson created a Trooper Progressive Lager together with the German craft beer brewery Crew Republic.

=== Fencing ===
Dickinson originally wanted to take up the sport of boxing, however at the age of 13 he was instead convinced by one of his school teachers to try out fencing and quickly took a liking to the sport "because it seemed like a romantic, melodramatic form of combat." At the age of 15 Dickinson won the school fencing competition and became team captain. This allowed Dickinson to start a professional career in London and was ranked as high as No. 7 in Britain. However, in his late teens he gave up the sport completely as music began becoming his main priority. In 1983 he began training again whenever his commitments with Iron Maiden allowed him, and he would start participating in regional tournaments. Dickinson has claimed he got back into the sport during this period to distract himself from the temptations of drugs, alcohol, and sex that came with his fame and touring. During Iron Maiden's time off between the Powerslave tour and the recording of Somewhere in Time, Dickinson and a friend of his began traveling across Europe competing in tournaments. During this time Dickinson who was a right handed fencer his entire career decided to start training with his left hand and by the summer of 1986 he had become a competent left handed fencer. When Iron Maiden had finished recording Seventh Son of a Seventh Son in West Germany in 1987, the band could not return to England immediately for tax purposes. So Dickinson moved to Bonn, and began training at the West German national centre for fencing. By the end of the 1987–1988 season he was ranked 18th in Britain, and after touring for Seventh Son he was once again ranked 7th in the men's foil discipline, but by the end of the 1989–1990 season he had fallen to 35th. Throughout the 1980s Dickinson would also train with the British Olympic team.

Bruce joined the London Thames Fencing Club at Roehampton during the 2000s. In 2013 he had an unofficial match with Norwegian Olympic silver medalist Bartosz Piasecki. He gave Dickson credit stating "He's kick-ass, short but incredibly fast, that's his weapon." In 2022 Dickinson won a silver medal in the European fencing championships, veteran category. More recently Dickinson represented Great Britain in the 2025 veterans category of the Circuit Européen where he finished in 13th out of 31.

== Singing style and stage performance ==
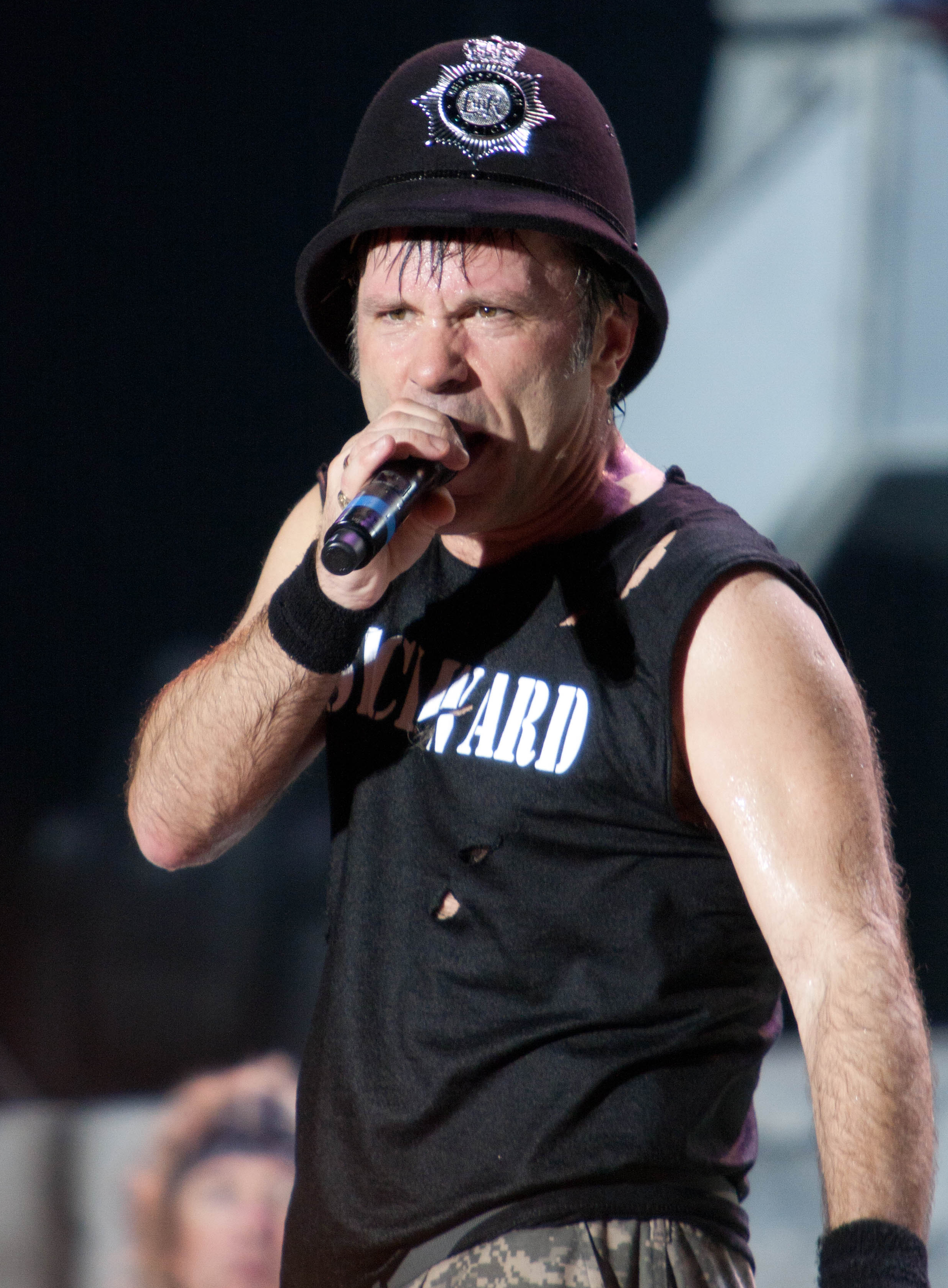
Dickinson performing in Ottawa, Ontario, 2010

Although Dickinson never received formal training, he possesses a wide vocal range which is characterised by his quasi-operatic tenor. Along with Ronnie James Dio and Rob Halford, Dickinson is one of the pioneers of the operatic vocal style later to be adopted by power metal vocalists and regularly appears near the top in lists of the greatest rock vocalists/front-men of all time. Dickinson says that his style was influenced primarily by Arthur Brown, Peter Hammill (Van der Graaf Generator), Ian Anderson (Jethro Tull) and Ian Gillan (Deep Purple).

Dickinson's singing varied in the 1990s in the recording of albums such as No Prayer for the Dying, Fear of the Dark and his first solo work Tattooed Millionaire, making use of a much more raspy and unpolished sound, befitting their stripped down style. Since returning to Iron Maiden in 1999, his singing style has returned to much like it was in the 1980s, though his voice has lowered with age. According to a report published in the Daily Mirror, Dickinson has an estimated vocal range of 4.25 octaves. His voice led to the nickname "The Air Raid Siren", which Billboard states is "due to the ferocious power of his singing", although Dickinson said it actually originated from a fan complaint.

In addition to his vocal ability, Dickinson has been described as an energetic stage performer. He considers including the audience "the essence of the Maiden experience" and that his role is to "shrink the venue ... to turn that football stadium into the world's smallest club". To achieve this, Dickinson seeks eye contact with audience members and urges them to join in with the phrase "scream for me" (followed by the concert's location). He is critical of performers who do not connect with their fans, particularly those who "[hide] behind the amps" and use an autocue, remarking that "people pay good money and [they] can't even remember the sodding words".

== Awards, accolades and titles ==
Armed Forces Day UK:

- 2026: RAF ODIHAM OFFICIAL Combat Emblem – HGC Bruce Dickinson and Iron Maiden Band

ASTRAEUS Airlines Capitan

- 2007: Astraeus Capitan Title – Bruce Dickinson, Iron Maiden
- 2010: Astraeus Marketing Director

Antyradio Awards

- 2016: Vocalist of the Year
- 2021: Vocalist of the Year
- 2022: Vocalist of the Year

Asian Independent Film Festival:

- 2026: Best Music Video: "Tears of the Dragon"

'BBC Radio Awards'

- 2002: Best Music DJ – Sony Award for Bruce Dickinson (Iron Maiden)
- 2006: Best Rock Programme – Monsters of Rock with Bruce Dickinson (Iron Maiden)
- 2008: Golden Rock Mike – Bruce Dickinson (Iron Maiden)
- 2010: Best Author's Programme – BBC Radio 6 Music with Bruce Dickinson (Iron Maiden)

Berlin Music Video Awards:

- 2026: Bronze Award: "Tears of the Dragon"

Bogota International Airport

- 2009: Honorary Capitan Title – Bruce Dickinson, Iron Maiden

Butanan Institute São Paulo

- 2019: Extraordinarius brucedickinsoni – A new species of Brazilian spider. Name inspired by the singer of Iron Maiden

CAERDAV

- 2018: Co-founder, chairman and owner – Bruce Dickinson (Iron Maiden)

Californian Buckwheat Named After Iron Maiden's Frontman

- 2018: Eriogonum fasciculatum "Bruce Dickinson"

Congress of Argentina Honours

- 2019: Relief Salon De Los Pasos Perdidos – State prize for individual Iron Maiden musicians for their contribution to the development of the country's culture and music. For the first time ever awarded to a foreign artist

Corporational Activity & Speakings:

- 2026: Business & Motivational Trainings – Bruce Dickinson

Deutscherock Antenne Hall of Fame

- 2026: Solo Artist – Bruce Dickinson (Iron Maiden - inducted)

Eastern Europe Film Festival:

- 2026: Best Music Video: "Tears of the Dragon"

El Salvador Ministry of Tourism

- 2016: Honorary Visitors of the Country Award – Dickinson as the member of Iron Maiden

Film Festival of Sarajevo

- 2016: Human Rights Award – Scream For Me, Sarajevo, Bruce Dickinson (Iron Maiden)
- 2016: Special Jury Prize – Scream For Me, Sarajevo, Bruce Dickinson (Iron Maiden)
- 2016: Audience Award – Scream For Me, Sarajevo, Bruce Dickinson (Iron Maiden)
- 2017: Official Competition Award – Scream For Me, Sarajevo, Bruce Dickinson (Iron Maiden)

Golden Raspberry Award

- 1989: The Worst Original Song – Bring Your Daughter to... the Slaughter, Bruce Dickinson (author)

Hollywood's RockWalk

- 2005: RockWalk of Fame Inductee – Bruce Dickinson as the member of Iron Maiden

Honorary Citizen of Curitiba City

- 2024: Bruce Dickinson (Iron Maiden)

Honorary Citizen of Sarajevo

- 2018: Bruce Dickinson (Iron Maiden)

Intelligent Life Magazine

- 2009: Official Polymath Title – Bruce Dickinson (Iron Maiden)

Kart Races São Paulo

- 2023: Gold Medal Winner – Bruce Dickinson (Iron Maiden)

Los Angeles Film Awards:

- 2026: Best Music Video: "Tears of the Dragon"

Los Angeles Film Festival IAF:

- 2026: Best Music Video: "Tears of the Dragon"

Matwatches France

- 2020: Brand Ambasador – Bruce Dickinson (Iron Maiden)

Mayor of Albuquerque Award:

- 2025: Keys to the City – Bruce Dickinson (Iron Maiden)

New York International Film Awards:

- 2026: Best Music Video: "Tears of the Dragon"

QMUL Engagement and Enterprise Award

- 2017: Dr Hamit Soyel – The Prize Bruce Dickinson Award for Academic Entrepreneur of the Year

Rock and Roll Hall of Fame

- 2017: Heavy Metal Permanent Exhibition – Bruce Dickinson's electrick jacket "Somewhere in Time Tour 1986/87", Iron Maiden
- 2026: Inductee (Iron Maiden)

Rhode Island International Film Festival

- 2017: Official Documentary Award – Scream For Me, Sarajevo, Bruce Dickinson (Iron Maiden)

Robinsons Brewery Award

- 2015: Golden Disc in Recognize of 10 MLN Sales – Bruce Dickinson & Iron Maiden
- 2021: Recognize of 30 MLN Sales – Bruce Dickinson & Iron Maiden

Rock Aid Armenia

- 1990: First Charity Gold Record Award & Pledge – Bruce Dickinson, Nicko McBrain, Steve Harris (Iron Maiden)

Royal Air Force (RAF UK)

- 2020: RAF Honorary Group Captain – Bruce Dickinson (Iron Maiden)

Royal Mail Honors

- 2023: Post stamps series dedicated to the greatest legends of music – Iron Maiden, Dickinson as the band's frontman

São Paulo International Airport

- 2009: Honorary Capitan Title – Bruce Dickinson, Iron Maiden

Sweden Luleå International Film Festival:

- 2026: Best Music Video: "Tears of the Dragon"

TAM Museu

- 2011: Official Title Comandante Do Metal Bruce Dickinson (Iron Maiden)

The Sixth April Award

- 2019: Hero of Sarajevo – Bruce Dickinson (Iron Maiden)

The Speakers Awards (Speaker Oscars)

- 2026: Best Live Speaker Award – Bruce Dickinson (Iron Maiden)
- 2026: Speaker of the Year (HM) – Bruce Dickinson (Iron Maiden)

Tripwire Awards

- 2025: Best Collection Award – Bruce Dickinson (Iron Maiden), Mandrake Project

Tuzla Film Festival

- 2017: Best Documentary – Scream For Me, Sarajevo, Bruce Dickinson (Iron Maiden)

UK British Fencing Veterans

- 2022: Official Member of BFV – Bruce Dickinson

UK's National Fencing Team

- 1987: National Fencing Team Member – Bruce Dickinson (Iron Maiden) No. 7

Universidad Católica del Ecuador

- 2024: Brand new species of Amazonian lizards named after Bruce Dickinson – Enyalioides Dickinsoni

University do Triângulo

- 2017: Venezuelan species of trees named after Bruce Dickinson – Clusia dickinsoniana J.E. Nascim

University of Helsinki

- 2019: Honorary Doctor of Philosophy (PhD HC) – Bruce Dickinson (Iron Maiden)

Queen Mary University of London, QMUL

- 1981: Master's degree in History – Bruce Dickinson (Iron Maiden)
- 2011: Honorary Doctor of Music (DMA HC) – Bruce Dickinson (Iron Maiden)

World Premiere Films Awards:

- 2026: Best Music Video: "Tears of the Dragon"
- 2026: Best Editing: "Tears of the Dragon"
- 2026: Best Arrangement: "Tears of the Dragon"

== Discography ==
Iron Maiden

Main article: Iron Maiden discography
- The Number of the Beast (1982)
- Piece of Mind (1983)
- Powerslave (1984)
- Somewhere in Time (1986)
- Seventh Son of a Seventh Son (1988)
- No Prayer for the Dying (1990)
- Fear of the Dark (1992)
- Brave New World (2000)
- Dance of Death (2003)
- A Matter of Life and Death (2006)
- The Final Frontier (2010)
- The Book of Souls (2015)
- Senjutsu (2021)

Solo

Main article: Bruce Dickinson discography
- Tattooed Millionaire (1990)
- Balls to Picasso (1994)
- Skunkworks (1996)
- Accident of Birth (1997)
- The Chemical Wedding (1998)
- Tyranny of Souls (2005)
- The Mandrake Project (2024)
- PsychoGod (2027)

Samson

- Survivors ^{*} (1979)
- Head On (1980)
- Shock Tactics (1981)
- Live at Reading '81 (1990)

Special appearances

- Xero – "Oh Baby!" (Lone Wolf EP, 1983)
- Soundtrack – A Nightmare on Elm Street 5: The Dream Child ("Bring Your Daughter... to the Slaughter", 1989)
- Rock Aid Armenia / various artists – The Earthquake Album (1990)
- Comic Relief – with Mr. Bean and Smear Campaign ("(I Want to Be) Elected", 1992)
- Nativity in Black: A Tribute to Black Sabbath ("Sabbath Bloody Sabbath", 1994)
- Montserrat Caballé – Friends for Life ("Bohemian Rhapsody", 1997)
- Various artists – ECW: Extreme Music ("The Zoo", 1998)
- Soundtrack – Bride of Chucky ("Trumpets of Jericho", 1998)
- Humanary Stew: A Tribute to Alice Cooper ("Black Widow", 1998)
- Ayreon – Universal Migrator Part 2: Flight of the Migrator ("Into the Black Hole", 2000)
- Halford – Resurrection ("The One You Love to Hate", 2000)
- Halford – Live Insurrection ("The One You Love to Hate", 2001)
- Tribuzy – Execution (2005)
- Tribuzy – Execution: Live Reunion (2007)

=== Iron Maiden videos/DVD ===
- Video Pieces (1983)
- Behind the Iron Curtain (1985)
- Live After Death (1985)
- 12 Wasted Years (1987)
- Maiden England (1989)
- The First Ten Years (1990)
- From There to Eternity (1992)
- Donington Live 1992 (1993)
- Raising Hell (1994)
- The Number of the Beast (2001)
- Rock in Rio (2002)
- Visions of the Beast (2003)
- The Early Days (2004)
- Death on the Road (2006)
- Iron Maiden: Flight 666 (2009)
- En Vivo! (2012)

* Dickinson appeared on the album's re-issue only, as the original version was completed before he joined the band.

== Tours ==
- 1990: Tattooed Millionaire Tour
- 1994–1995: Balls to Picasso Tour
- 1996: Skunkworks Tour
- 1997: Accident of Birth Tour
- 1998–1999: The Chemical Wedding Tour
- 2002: Airraid over Europe Tour
- 2024–25: The Mandrake Project Tour
- 2027: PsychoGod Tour

=== The Mandrake Project tour ===
The tour takes place between the 2023 and 2024 legs of Iron Maiden's The Future Past World Tour.

2024 touring band members

- Bruce Dickinson – lead vocals
- Chris Declercq – guitar
- Philip Naslund – guitar
- Tanya O'Callaghan – bass
- Mistheria – keyboards
- Dave Moreno – drums
