= Thunderstick =

English drummer (born 1954)

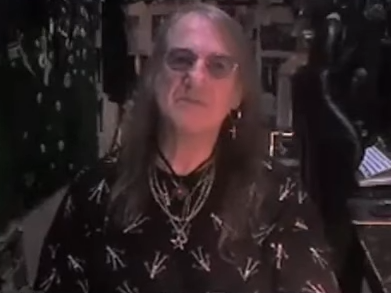
- Thunderstick in 2023

Background information
- Also known as: Barry Graham; Thunderstick
- Born: Barry Graham Purkis; 7 December 1954 (age 71); England
- Genres: Heavy metal, hard rock
- Occupations: Musician, songwriter
- Instrument: Drums
- Years active: 1974–present
- Labels: Heaven and Hell

Barry Graham Purkis, more commonly known by his stage name Thunderstick (born 7 December 1954), is an English drummer who wore various masks and used to perform on-stage closed in a cage. He was in the cult-band Samson, with whom his name is most associated.

In 1979, he developed his persona modelled on horror icons such as The Rocky Horror Show, Dr. Phibes and the old Hammer horror films, alternatively wearing black and white make-up, an old man/schoolteacher mask, a black cotton mask and his trademarked rhinestone covered mirrorball mask. He played inside a cage, including during a brief Samson reunion in 2000. With Samson he enjoyed a certain degree of success, especially when their album Head On was released in 1980 and reached No. 34 in the UK Albums Chart. The following single Riding With The Angels, from the album Shock Tactics, charted in the UK Singles Chart at No. 54.

In a rare occurrence his face was seen when he performed the main-role in the b-movie Biceps of Steel, featuring his band at the time Samson. In the film his then brother-in-law Ben K. Reeves performed as Thunderstick in his stead, only for the shots where Purkis and Thunderstick were set to appear at the same time.

In the June 2005 issue of Classic Rock Magazine, Thunderstick was listed as no. 36 in the "50 Greatest Drummers in Rock" feature.

== Early days and Iron Maiden ==
In 1973–74, Purkis played with precursors-of-punk band Tiny and the Hot Toddies (THT), who played mainly around London's West End. THT split in 1974 when Purkis and THT's lead guitarist went to Italy, living permanently in Sicily to play professionally with the English band The Primitives (also known as "Mal and the Primitives" - not to be confused with the eighties UK band) in 1974. They extensively toured in south Italy.

On returning to England Purkis then became a drummer for the English band Iron Maiden in 1977–1978, some time before he would create his masked persona. His tenure with Iron Maiden was brief doing a handful of live dates.At a later date whilst now playing with Samson a joint songwriting issue came about that was never legally contested.Iron Maiden released a track named 'The Ides of March' on their 'Killers' album, Samson had already released a version of the same song appearing on the album 'Head On' entitled 'Thunderburst'.Harris was given joint songwriting credit on the Samson version. Whereas Purkis was never credited on the Iron Maiden track.Something that to this day remains in contention. During his early Samson tenure, Purkis was also asked to rejoin Iron Maiden in 1980 after the band had been touring with Samson but declined in favour of staying with Samson. This was mainly because his bizarre theatrical image THUNDERSTICK had gained recognition, and he was then seen to be "the face of the New Wave Of British Heavy Metal". His Samson predecessor Clive Burr eventually took the Maiden position.

== Self-named band and beyond ==
After he left Samson for artistic divergences, Thunderstick then went on to form his own eponymous band called Thunderstick consisting of two guitarists, bass and female vocalist. They recorded two hard rock albums, the EP Feel like Rock 'n' Roll? (1983) and a full feature LP Beauty and the Beasts (1984) via Magnum/Thunderbolt Records. These have been restored and remastered for a 2011 CD release, an anthology called Echoes from the Analogue Asylum which also features previously unreleased material.

The band disbanded in 1986, after having recorded their yet-to-be-released final album Don't Touch, I'll Scream. Both Thunderstick and vocalist Jodee Valentine went to the United States to try to secure a new deal. A new American line-up was considered, but was soon abandoned in favour of maintaining their identity within the NWOBHM scene. Both returned to the UK. A fifth incarnation emerged in 1988, secured by a high-profile management contract, but Thunderstick disbanded again after failing to sign a major deal with a label.

As Barry Purkis, in the late 1980s, he worked with Bernie Tormé and the Electric Gypsies, and other artists.

He performed as Thunderstick again in a series of Paul Samson solo gigs in America along with bassist Eric Mauriello, in 1989. Former Kiss guitarist Ace Frehley jammed with them during an encore at the New York Roxy. Thunderstick rejoined Samson twice, once in 1990 to write and record new material (later issued on 1999's Past Present & Future) and then again in 1999–2000, for reunion gigs either in Japan and on the Wacken Festival set in Germany. His songwriting input is present on Paul Samson's posthumous solo album P.S.... 1953–2002 (2006) originally scheduled to be Samson's new album with the title of Brand New Day.

Purkis still writes music, and is involved in production for other artists. On 25 April 2009, he played at the Keep It True Festival in Germany with a reunion of various new wave of British heavy metal artists, marking the return of his Thunderstick persona.

On 22 April 2016, former lead vocalist Jodee Valentine died aged 56. Following Valentine's death, Purkis decided to bring back Thunderstick. The band has reformed with a new line-up, and a new album, Something Wicked This Way Comes, was released in July 2017.

After some line-up changes and tours, Thunderstick released its third album in 2023: Lockdown. At the time of writing this a new Thunderstick album is currently being mixed for release in 2026.

== Thunderstick band line-ups ==
1981-82: Vinnie Munro (vocals), Neil Hay (guitar), Colin Heart (guitar), Ben K. Reeve (bass), Thunderstick (drums).

1982-83: Ana Marie Carmella Borg (vocals), Wango Wiggins (Neil Hay's new stage name, guitar), Cris Martin (guitar), Ben K. Reeve (bass), Thunderstick (drums).

1983-84: Jodee Valentine (vocals), Wango Wiggins (guitar), Cris Martin (guitar), Ben K. Reeve (bass), Thunderstick (drums), Ana Marie Carmella Borg (vocals for the 1983 EP were provided by Ana but the cover featured a photo of Jodee Valentine who had by then replaced her and was touring with the band).

1984-86: Jodee Valentine (vocals), Wango Wiggins (guitar), Bengt Sorenssen (guitar), Ben K. Reeve (bass), Thunderstick (drums).

1987-88: Jodee Valentine (vocals), Dave Kilford (guitar), Paul Lewis (guitar), John Slight (bass), Thunderstick (drums).

2017 (studio): Lucie V (vocals), Martin Shellard (guitar), Dave Kilford (guitar), Rex Thunderbolt (bass), Thunderstick (drums).

2018: Viixen (vocals), Baz Roze (guitar), Lee Quenby (guitar), Rex Thunderbolt (bass), Thunderstick (drums).

Present: Raven Blackwing (vocals), Peter J. Pinto (lead guitar), Stitch (rhythm guitar), Rex Thunderbolt (bass), Thunderstick (drums).

== Discography ==
Studio albums with Samson

- Survivors (1979)
- Head On (1980)
- Shock Tactics (1981)
- Head Tactics (1986 - Head On and Shock Tactics fused together and remixed)
- Past Present & Future (1999, anthology featuring the 1990 tracks)

Live albums with Samson

- Metal Crusade '99 (1999 - featuring four bands including Samson)
- Live in London 2000 (2000)

Studio albums as Thunderstick

- Feel like Rock 'n' Roll? (1983)
- Beauty and the Beasts (1984)
- Echoes from the Analogue Asylum (2011)
- Something Wicked This Way Comes (2017)
- 'Something Wicked This Way Came,Live In France' (2019)
- Lockdown (2023)

Special appearances

- ‘’For Gillan Fans Only’’ (1980, free album with Gillan’s Glory Road LP, one song: ‘’Come Tomorrow’’)
- A Bolt from the Black (1984, various artists compilation, one song: Runaround)
- Just'In Power (1987, various artists compilation, one new song: Don't Touch, I'll Scream)
- Best of British Metal (1999, various artists compilation, two new songs: Dark Night Black Light and Shining)

Videos

- Biceps of Steel (1980), featured on Bruce Dickinson's Anthology.
- Thunder, Thunder (1985, unreleased videoclip).
- The History of Iron Maiden – Part 1: The Early Days (2004 DVD, archive footage only)
- Iron Maiden and the New Wave of British Heavy Metal (2008 DVD).

== See also ==
- List of new wave of British heavy metal bands
