= Nicky Moore =

English musical artist (1947–2022)

- Born: 21 June 1947
- Origin: England
- Died: 3 August 2022 (aged 75)
- Genres: Heavy metal, hard rock, blues
- Instruments: Vocals, keyboards, guitar
- Years active: 1969–2022

Nicholas Charles Moore (21 June 1947 – 3 August 2022) was an English blues, rock and heavy metal singer, who was best known as a member of the British band Samson. He replaced Bruce Dickinson who left the band to join Iron Maiden in 1982. Moore left Samson in the late 1980s and rejoined in the late 1990s.

After his initial departure from Samson, Moore sang in the band Mammoth, which also featured former Gillan bassist John McCoy. Mammoth released two albums before splitting up in 1989.

In 2006, Moore teamed up with former Nazareth guitarist Manny Charlton and three musicians from the Swedish band Locomotive Breath to record an album under the band name "From Behind". The band performed at the Sweden Rock Festival on 9 June 2006.

From 1994, Moore worked with his own band, Nicky Moore and the Blues Corporation, who were voted 'Top Live Blues Band' by BBC Radio 2 listeners in the year 2000.

On 3 August 2022, Moore died at the age of 75 from Parkinson's disease.

== Discography ==
=== Hackensack ===
- "Moving On" (Single with "River Boat" B-Side, 1972)
- Up the Hard Way (1974)
- Live – The Hard Way (Recorded in 1973, released in 1996)
- Give It Some (Recorded between 1969 and 1972, released in 1997)
- The Final Shunt (Recorded and released in 2017 AACD074)

=== Tiger ===
- "Crazy" / "Bloody Blue Monday" (Single, 1975)
- "I Am an Animal" (Single, 1975)
- Tiger (1976)
- Goin' Down Laughing (1976)

=== Big Jim Sullivan Band ===
- Test of Time (Recorded in 1977, released in 1983 and 1994)

=== Samson ===
- "Life on the Run" (1982) (Single)
- "Losing My Grip" (1982) (Single)
- Before the Storm (1982)
- "Red Skies" (1982) (Single)
- "Are You Ready" (1984) (Single)
- Don't Get Mad, Get Even (1984)
- "The Fight Goes On" (1984) (Single)
- Thank You & Goodnight... (1985) (Live)
- "No Turning Back" / "Reach Out To Love" (1984) (Single)
- Joint Forces (1986)
- Pillars of Rock (1990) (Compilation)
- The Masters (1998) (Compilation)
- Test of Time (1999) (Compilation and unreleased material)
- Past, Present & Future (1999) (Compilation)
- Wacken 2000 Special Report (2001) (V.A. DVD, live)
- Live in London 2000 (2001) (Live)
- There & back (2001) (Compilation of unreleased versions, mixes and outtakes)
- Riding with the Angels – The Anthology (2002) (Compilation)
- P.S.... (2006)
- Tomorrow & Yesterday (2006) (Compilation)

=== Mammoth ===
- Fatman (EP, 1987)
- "Can't Take the Hurt" (Single, 1987)
- "All the Days" (Single, 1988)
- Mammoth (1989)
- XXXL (1997)
- The Collection (2001) (Compilation)
- Larger & Live (2003) (Compilation)
- Leftovers, Relics & Rarities (2007) (Compilation)

=== From Behind ===
- Game Over (2006)

=== The Nicky Moore Band ===
- "Year of the Lie" (Single, 1981)

=== Nicky Moore and The Blues Corporation ===
- Just Got Back (1994)
- Holding On (1995)
- Take Me Home (1997)
- 300 Pounds of Joy (1999)
- Old, New, Borrowed & Blue (2000)
- Live (2001)
- Hog on a Log (2006)

=== Collaborations ===
- Electric Sun – Beyond the Astral Skies (1985, background vocals on "The Night the Master Comes")
- Gerry Rafferty – On a Wing and a Prayer (1993, background vocals)
- Spearfish – Back for the Future (Guest vocals on "In the Ghetto")

=== Contributions ===
- "Ain't No Love in the Heart of the City" (Included on various compilations)
- "And That Ain't All" (Included on various compilations)
- "Gimme All Your Lovin'" (Included on Gimme All Your Top – A Tribute to ZZ Top)
- "Honky Tonk Women" (Included on "A Tribute to The Rolling Stones")
- "Is This Love" (Included on various compilations)
- "Let Me Be Your Dog" (Included on Another Hair of the Dog – A Tribute to Nazareth)
- "Only You Can Rock Me" (Included on Only UFO Can Rock Me – A Tribute to UFO)
- "Ruby Tuesday" (Included on A Tribute to The Rolling Stones)
- "Tonight's the Night" (Included on various compilations)
- "Whiskey in the Jar" (Included on Top Musicians Play Thin Lizzy)
- "You Wear It Well" (Included on various compilations)

== See also ==
- List of new wave of British heavy metal bands
