= Paul Samson =

English guitarist (1953–2002)

- Born: 4 June 1953
- Died: 9 August 2002 (aged 49) Norwich, England
- Genres: Heavy metal; blues rock; hard rock
- Occupation: Musician
- Instruments: Guitar; vocals
- Years active: 1976–2002

Paul Samson (4 June 1953 – 9 August 2002) was an English guitarist, best known as the founder of the hard rock band Samson.

Born Paul Sanson, his first band in 1968 was a local Kent based group called 'The Innocence' which consisted of him, Stewart Cochrane, Phil Stranders and the late Martin Kirrage. After a period in several obscure bands, Samson formed his own eponymous outfit, Samson, in 1977, consisting of Chris Aylmer on bass guitar, and Clive Burr on drums. Burr left, and eventually joined Iron Maiden, and was replaced by Thunderstick, who wore a gimp mask on stage. In 1979, the line-up was expanded to a four-piece, with the addition of Bruce Dickinson on vocals (under the stage name "Bruce Bruce".)

The band enjoyed a cult following in the new wave of British heavy metal, releasing the albums, Survivors, Head On and Shock Tactics, in 1981, Mel Gaynor replaced Thunderstick, and following their performance at the Reading Festival, Dickinson left to join Iron Maiden.

Nicky Moore was recruited as a replacement, and then Pete Jupp took over drums, and this line-up released Before the Storm and Don't Get Mad - Get Even. These two albums sold in higher quantities than the first three, and the band toured more countries and played to bigger audiences than the Bruce/Thunderstick line-up, although the New Wave of British Heavy Metal was by now said to be a spent force. The band formally split up in 1984.

In 1985-1986, Paul Samson recorded a new album with Nicky Moore, intended to be a "supergroup" project with various past Samson members: Joint Forces. The album was first presented as a solo record, and later reinstated as a proper band record.

In 1986, Samson created the new band "Paul Samson's Empire", and toured with Iron Maiden until 1987. The members: Sam Blue/Sam Bluitt, Mick White, Dave "Bucket" Colwell, Kev Riddles, Mark Brabbs.

Paul Samson formed a new version of Samson in 1987, and disbanded it again in 1994, after various line-up changes.

Samson spent the subsequent years in a variety of solo and group projects, and had success as a record producer, and also as a blues player, spending a year in Chicago, Illinois, United States.

Despite some listings crediting Samson for playing on the Ram Jam 1977 hit single, "Black Betty", he did not play on the record. Although, Stewart Cochrane (musician and close friend to Samson since their early band days of the late 1960s, their first band at 15 years old "The Innocence" and short time member of the band "Samson") was told by Samson in 1978 that he played on the demo of the hit record "Black Betty", and was paid a paltry £20 for the session. Samson was very peeved about the payment, as he insisted to Cochrane that it was his guitar playing from the demo recording used in the final "Black Betty" pressing, and that he was missing out on a large amount of royalty payments. Cochrane can only confirm what Samson informed him of the alleged switch.

Samson died of cancer on 9 August 2002 in Norwich, whilst recording a new Samson album with Nicky Moore.

== Discography ==
Studio albums

- Joint forces (1986) (Samson album originally issued as Paul Samson solo record)
- P.S.... (2006) (Samson album posthumously issued as Paul Samson solo record)

Live albums

- Paul Samson's Empire – Live at the Marquee (original concert recorded in 1986, later remastered in 1994)
- Live - The Blues Nights (2003)
