= Carl Johan Grimmark =

Swedish guitarist

Carl Johann Grimmark
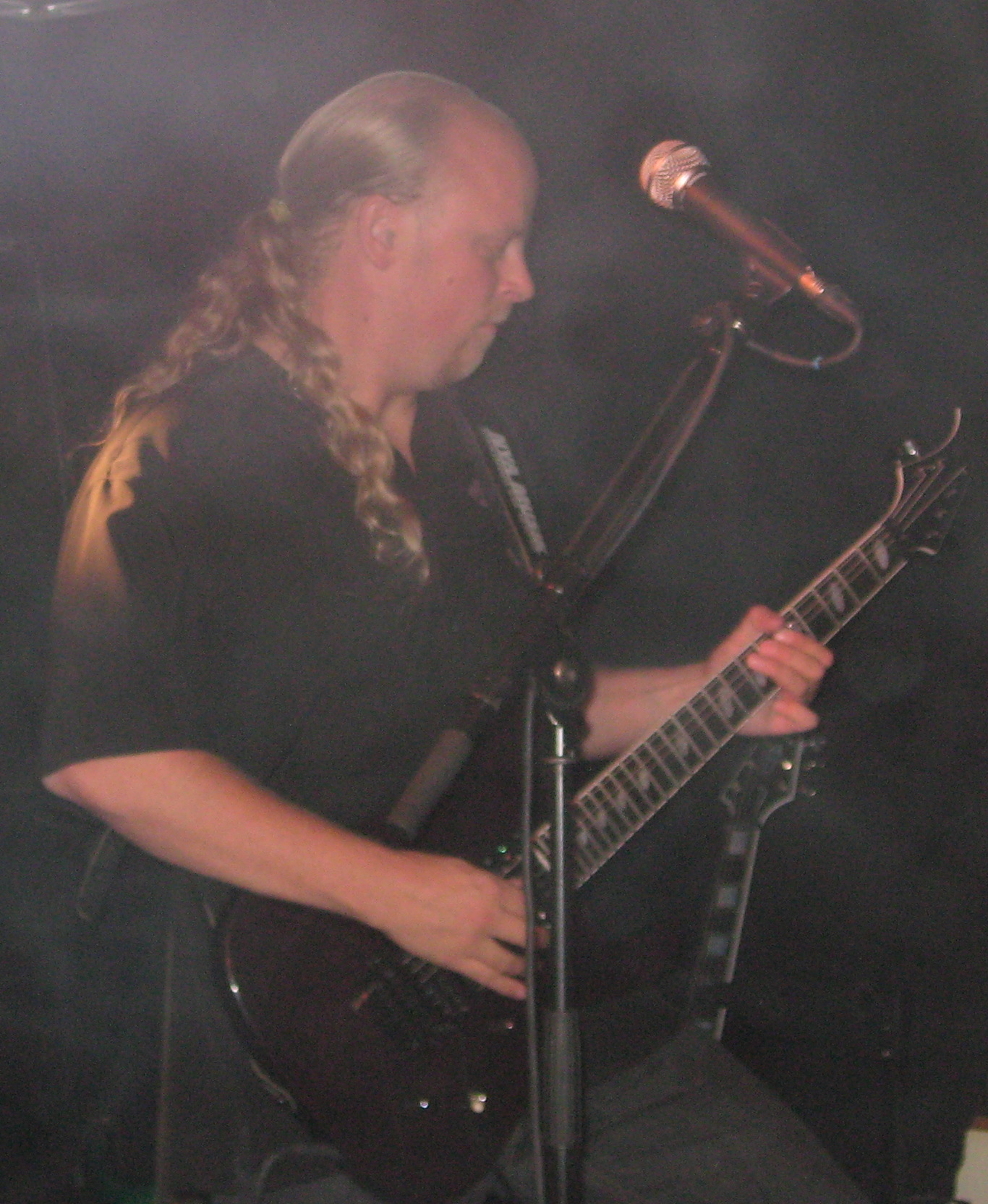
- Grimmark in 2009

Background information
- Born: 14 October 1977 (age 48)
- Origin: Huskvarna and Gothenburg, Sweden
- Genres: Neoclassical metal, progressive metal, power metal, Christian metal
- Occupation: Musician
- Instrument: Guitar
- Years active: 1993–present
- Website: grimmark.com

Carl Johan Grimmark (born 14 October 1977) is a Swedish guitarist. He has appeared with several influential Christian metal bands including Narnia, Saviour Machine, and Rob Rock. He joined the band Beautiful Sin in 2006. He has also played with Jerusalem on several occasions including Sweden rock in 2015. He's been a special guest guitarist on fellow Narnia bandmate Christian Liljegren's side projects Divinefire and Audiovision. He recorded his debut solo album titled Grimmark, where he also handles the lead vocals. Grimmark's style of playing, especially on Narnia's earlier work, is often compared to the neoclassical metal stylings of Yngwie Malmsteen, or under a more broad genre, neoclassicism.

Grimmark is the main composer in Narnia, and on their album The Great Fall he wrote most of the lyrics. On their other albums the lyrics have been written by their vocalist Christian Liljegren. Grimmark is also given credits as a producer on several of Narnia's albums.

Grimmark has become a highly acclaimed guitarist in the Christian hard rock music genre as more people are exposed to his solid technical abilities, which can be exemplified by the fact that he is credited for playing every instrument on Narnia's debut album, Awakening, and his unique approach of incorporating a neoclassical sound into his music.

== Discography ==
=== German Pascual ===
- The New Beginning (2012)

=== Fullforce ===
- One (2011)

=== Narnia ===
- Awakening (1998)
- Long Live the King (1999)
- Desert Land (2001)
- The Great Fall (2003) (Not released in Japan)
- At Short Notice... Live in Germany (2006)
- Enter the Gate (2006)
- Decade of Confession (2007)
- Course of a Generation (2009)
- Narnia (2016)
- From Darkness to Light (2019)
- Ghost Town (2023)
- X (2026)

=== Saviour Machine ===
- Legend Part III:I (2001)
- Live in Deutschland (2002)
- Rarities/Revelations (2006)
- Legend Part III:II (TBA)

=== Various ===
- Guitar Odyssey: Tribute to Yngwie Malmsteen (2001)
- Return to Fantasy: A Tribute to Uriah Heep (2003)

=== Sanctifica ===
- Negative B (2002)

=== Rob Rock ===
- Eyes of Eternity (2003)
- Holy Hell (2005)
- Garden of Chaos (2007)
- The Voice of Melodic Metal – Live in Atlanta (2009)

=== Locomotive Breath ===
- Train of Events (2003)

=== System Breakdown ===
- 102 (2003)

=== Divinefire ===
- Glory Thy Name (2004)
- Hero (2005)
- Into a New Dimension (2006)
- Eye of the Storm (2011)

=== Audiovision ===
- The Calling (2005)

=== Flagship ===
- Maiden Voyage (2005)

=== Planet Alliance ===
- Planet Alliance (2006)

=== Deep Effect ===
- Deep Effect

=== Grimmark ===
- Grimmark (2007)

Solo effort by guitar phenom Carl Johan Grimmark, best known for his work with melodic metal band Narnia. Grimmark handles vocals himself on this outing.

=== Empire 21 ===
- Empire 21 (2014)

=== Preterist ===
- Blood Moon Rising (2022)

=== Martin Simson's Destroyer of Death ===
- "'Eternal Reign'" (2023)

American melodic metal project founded by Martin Simson featuring Jørn Lande, Rob Rock, CJ Grimmark, Anders Köllerfors and Anders Johansson.

== See also ==
- List of rock instrumentals
- Neoclassical metal
- Shred guitar
