= Liljegren Records =

Swedish record label

Liljegren Records / CMSweden
- Founded: 1997
- Founder: Christian Liljegren
- Genre: Heavy metal, Christian metal (primarily)
- Country of origin: Sweden
- Official website: www.rivelrecords.com

Liljegren Records / CMSweden is a Swedish heavy metal music record label founded by Christian Liljegren (formerly of Narnia) in 1997. The label was originally titled C.L. Music and Distribution but was changed later. Notable current and former groups on the labels roster include Divinefire, Veni Domine, Crimson Moonlight, ReinXeed, Sanctifica and Pantokrator.

== Roster ==
As of 2010, the musicians with the label included:

- Chains
- Golden Resurrection
- Hardcore Circus

== Other artists ==
- Charlie Shred
- Crimson Moonlight (active)
- Divinefire (active)
- Essence of Sorrow
- Heel
- Majestic Vanguard (active)
- Mirador
- Miseration (active)
- Morning Dwell
- Oratorio
- Oriz
- Pantokrator (active)
- Parakletos
- ReinXeed (active)
- Sanctifica (disbanded)
- Sons of Thunder
- Veni Domine (disbanded)
