= Holy Hell (Rob Rock album) =

Studio album by Rob Rock
- Released: April 5, 2005
- Genres: Heavy metal, power metal, Christian metal
- Length: 46:43
- Labels: AFM Records (worldwide); JVC/Victor (Asia)
- Producer: Roy Z

Rob Rock chronology
Eyes of Eternity (2003)	Holy Hell (2005)	Garden of Chaos (2007)

Professional ratings
Review scores
Source	Rating
Allmusic	3.5/5 stars
Powermetal.de	8/10
Rock Hard	8.5/10

Holy Hell is the third solo album by American heavy metal musician Rob Rock, released on April 5, 2005. It is his first album with AFM Records. It was produced by Roy Z, and mixed and mastered by Jacob Hansen. Roy Z is also credited for performing some of the guitar and bass parts on the album. Other contributing musicians include guitarist Carl Johan Grimmark of Narnia fame, drummer Bobby Jarzombek who has played in bands such as Riot and Halford, and Edguy and Avantasia mainman Tobias Sammet who duets with Rob Rock on the closing track, "Move On", an ABBA cover. It was the second ABBA song covered by Rock after recording "Eagle", also off ABBA: The Album, for his solo debut, Rage of Creation.

== Track listing ==
1. "Slayer of Souls" (3:32)
2. "First Winds of the End of Time" (4:38)
3. "Calling Angels" (4:40)
4. "Holy Hell" (4:03)
5. "Lion of Judah" (5:09)
6. "I'm a Warrior" (4:20)
7. "I'll Be Waiting for You" (4:49)
8. "When Darkness Reigns" (5:48)
9. "The Revelation" (4:19)
10. "Move On" (5:12) featuring Tobias Sammet

Bonus Tracks:

1. "Ride the Wind" featuring Gus G. Guitar Solo (3:51)
2. "Lost in a World" from ROC session (5:21)
3. "I'm a Warrior (Alternative Mix)" (4:22)
4. "First Winds of the End of Time (Alternative Mix)" (4:45)

== Credits ==
- Rob Rock – lead and backing vocals
- Tobias Sammet – lead vocals on "Move On"
- Liza Shekhter – backing vocals and keyboards on "Move On"
- Carl Johan Grimmark – guitars
- Roy Z – guitars, bass
- The Warlock – guitars
- Bob Rossi – guitar solo on "The Revelation"
- Rick Renstrom – guitar solo on "Holy Hell"
- Bobby Jarzombek – drums
- Butch Carlson – drums on "Calling Angels"
- Dave Moreno – drums on "Move On"
- Andreas Olsson – bass
- Mistheria – keyboards
