= Christian Liljegren =

Swedish singer

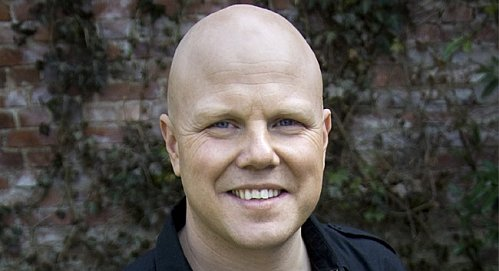
- Liljegren in 2010

Background information
- Born: 3 February 1971 (age 55)
- Origin: Sweden
- Genres: Christian metal, power metal
- Occupations: Singer, songwriter

Per Christian Liljegren (born 3 February 1971) is a Swedish musician.

== Career ==
Liljegren is best known as the lead vocalist and primary lyricist for the Christian melodic power metal band Narnia. He is also the frontman of the metal bands Audiovision, Divinefire, Flagship and Wisdom Call.

Liljegren owns the Liljegren Records label which features bands such as Divinefire, Crimson Moonlight, Sanctifica, Grimmark, Harmony, Veni Domine and Majestic Vanguard.

In April 2008, Christian announced his departure from Narnia. There was no controversy among the band members; Liljegren said he had to give his body rest. In 2014, he returned to Narnia.

Liljegren is the lead vocalist of the power metal project Golden Resurrection with Majestica's lead guitarist Tommy Johansson. Their debut album was released in November 2010.

== Personal life ==
He changed his last name to Rivel by choosing to take his wife's last name when they were married. After their divorce in 2008, he changed his name back to Liljegren.

Lilijegren is brothers with Hubertus Lilijegren, guitarist and vocalist for bands such as Crimson Moonlight, Pantokrator and Sanctifica.

== Discography ==
Venture

- The Wonderous Diamond (1988)

Trinity

- Soldiers Of Freedom (1988)

Borderline

- 5 Track Demo Cassette (1989)
- 7" Vinyl Single – Fri/Calling (1989)
- 3 Track Demo Cassette (1990)
- 7" Vinyl Single – I Can't Live Without Your Love/ Let Me Rest In Your Arms (1991)

Modest Attraction

- Modest Attraction (5 Track Demo Cassette) (1991)
- II – (5 Track Demo Cassette) (1992)
- Get Ready (1992)
- Blizzful Zample (1993)
- The Truth In Your Face (1994)
- Modest Christmas (Single) (1994)
- Divine Luxury (1996)

Narnia

- Awakening (1998)
- Long Live the King (1999)
- Desert Land (2001)
- The Great Fall (2003) (Not released in Japan)
- At Short Notice... Live in Germany (2006)
- Enter the Gate (2006)
- Decade of Confession (2007)
- Narnia (2016)
- We Still Believe – Made in Brazil (2018)
- From Darkness to Light (2019)
- Ghost Town (2023)
- X (2026)

Wisdom Call

- Wisdom Call (2001)

Beautiful Mind

- Hero (3 Track Demo) (2002)

Divinefire

- Glory Thy Name (2004)
- Hero (2005)
- Into a New Dimension (2006)
- Farewell (2008)
- Eye of the Storm (2011)

Flagship

- Mayden Voyage (2005)

Audiovision

- The Calling (2005)
- Focus (2010)

Golden Resurrection

- Glory to My King (2010)
- "Pray for Japan" (Single) (2011)
- Man with a Mission (2011)
- One Voice for the Kingdom (2013)

The Waymaker

- The Waymaker (2020)

Flames of Fire

- Flames of Fire (2022)
- Our Blessed Hope (2023)

Moonlit Masquerade

- Wreckage (2025)

Solo career

- Ett Liv Jag Fått Att Leva (2002)
- Kraft (2015)
- Melodic Passion (2021)
