= Nuclear Blaze =

American band

- Origin: Iowa, United States
- Genres: Christian metal, black metal, unblack metal, grindcore,war metal, death metal, deathgrind
- Years active: 2006–present
- Label: Nosral Recordings
- Members: Jarek Pozarycki
- Website: Nuclear Blaze on Facebook

Nuclear Blaze is a blackened grindcore project formed by Jarek "Fire" Pozarycki of unblack metal bands Frost Like Ashes and Elgibbor. The band began in July 2006, as a solo venture of Pozarycki. The band was signed with Nosral Recordings until it went out of business.

== History ==
The band began in July 2006, by Jarek Pozarycki of Elgibbor, Frost Like Ashes, and several other projects. The band recorded a few tracks and released them in 2010, including "Horror and Scorn" and "Drawn for the Slaughter". However, following that release, the band embarked on a hiatus, until 2017, when the band resurfaced and signed with Nosral Recordings. Once the project signed with the label, it released their sophomore album, The Time of Sodom and Gommorah, which came out on November 17, 2017. However, prior to that they had released a single, titled "Death Sucks". On December 4, 2017, a lyric video for the single released. In 2019, the project released "Toxic People", a new digital single.

== Discography ==
Studio albums

- Nuclear Blaze (2010)
- The Time of Sodom and Gommorah (2017)

Splits

- Under the Winds of the Apocalypse (2017, limited edition cassette; split w/ Winds of Terror)

Singles

- "Death Sucks" (2017)
- "Toxic People" (2019)
