= Sons of Thunder =

Sons of Thunder may refer to:

- Sons of Thunder (Christianity), the brothers James and John in the Bible (New Testament, Apostles of Jesus)
- Sons of Thunder (Labyrinth album)
- Sons of Thunder (Sleeping Giant album)
- Sons of Thunder (band), a Christian rock group that performed from 1967–1974
- Sons of Thunder (TV series), which ran from March to April 1999 on CBS
- Sons of Thunder (2019 TV series)

== See also ==
- Sons and Daughters of Thunder (2019 movie)
- Thunderchild (disambiguation)
