= Spirit of Purity =

Studio album by Sanctifica
- Released: March 2000
- Recorded: Studio Berghem, 1999
- Genre: Unblack metal
- Length: 40:10
- Label: Little Rose Productions, Rivel Records
- Producer: Mick Nordström & Sanctifica

Sanctifica chronology
In the Bleak Midwinter (1997)	Spirit of Purity (2000)	Negative B (2002)

Spirit of Purity is the debut album by the Swedish Christian black metal band Sanctifica, released on Little Rose Productions and Rivel Records in March 2000. With this album the band established itself as one of the leading Christian black metal bands of the early 2000s (decade), representing technical and chaotic style. Considered by many as the band's best album, Spirit of Purity was well received by both the press and fans, although the style quickly earned Sanctifica their "Emperor clone" label, which the band later tried to escape by switching the music style. Music videos were shot for the songs "The Dark Desires" and "Spirit of Purity," released on the video compilation Power from the Sky.

== Recording ==
With the line up consisting of Hubertus Liljegren (vocals, guitar), Jonathan Jansson (bass), Henrik Georgsson (guitar), Aron Engberg (keyboard), and Daniel Thelin (drums), Spirit of Purity was recorded at Studio Berghem in 1999, produced and engineered by Mick Nordström and Sanctifica. Guest vocals on "The Wanderer" were performed by Per Hagström. The album was published by Finnish Little Rose Productions in March 2002 and Rivel Records. The album was distributed by House of Kicks Distribution.

Two of the album's songs are sung in Swedish, "Riket" and "Allhärskaren", although all the lyrics are printed in English in the booklet. Sonically, the album is chaotic, emphasizing on melodic, technical tremolo riffing, very fast tempos, full soundscapes with keyboards and blast beats mixed to the background. "Riket (The Empire)" begins with a haunting, wintery keyboard intro before starting the black metal output. Some songs such as "Allhärskaren" focus more on the groovy, melodic songstructures, while others such as "The Wanderer" take a slightly more progressive approach. The lyrics deal with themes of grief and Christianity.

The album was considered an improvement over the band's debut EP In the Bleak Midwinter, gaining positive reviews from the press, and earned the band a devoted fanbase. Some considered the album to be too chaotic, while some called it a "masterpiece."

== Track listing ==
1. "Riket (The Empire)" - 4:35
2. "The Dark Desires" - 3:51
3. "Released From Pain" - 4:24
4. "Spirit of Purity" - 6:38
5. "Allhärskaren" - 5:19
6. "Landscape" - 3:14
7. "The Dark Embrace of Night" - 4:57
8. "The Wanderer" - 4:30
