= Joshua (band) =

American Christian metal band

- Also known as: Jaguar, M-Pire
- Origin: Los Angeles, California
- Genres: Christian metal • christian rock • hard rock • arena rock
- Years active: 1980–2024
- Label: RCA Records
- Members: Joshua Perahia; Mark Boals; Scott Warren; Bryan Fleming; Dino Maddalone
- Website: joshuaperahia.com

Joshua was a Christian metal band that formed in 1980. The band has re-formed under three names – Joshua, M Pire, and Joshua Perahia – but has remained centered on guitarist Joshua Perahia. Despite being based in Los Angeles, California, they are best known outside of the United States. Their best-known song, "November Is Going Away" (1983), was a No. 1 hit in Japan.

Joshua Perahia died from a cardiac arrest at 71 years old in October 2024

== History ==
The band's first release was entitled The Hand Is Quicker Than the Eye, which referred to Perahia's guitar skills and songwriting ability. Released by Enigma Records in 1983, the single "November Is Going Away" was the band's biggest hit, achieving No. 1 status in Japan. Frontman Perahia had a religious experience at a Hal Lindsey–lead Bible study in 1983, and converted to Protestant Christianity from his Greek Orthodox upbringing.

Perahia put together a new band for Surrender that included singer Jeff Fenholt. Surrender was released in 1985. Lyrically, the album marked a change in the band's style to lyrics which were evangelical and confrontational in nature. Rob Rock was involved with their third RCA Record album as Joshua, Intense Defense. In 1988, Intense Defense, which was recorded at Dierks Studios and produced by Frank Mono, was characterized by the editor of HM Magazine as being "probably the best AOR melodic metal album in the universe." It sold well worldwide, but not in the United States. Following Intense, Perahia reformed the band as Jaguar. Jaguar included Robert Basauri (Robyn Kyle) on vocals, Joe Tafoya on drums, and Bryan Fleming on bass. The band changed members while entertaining record deals and never released material under this name.

In 1995, Joey Rochrich (Bass), Eric Stoskopf (Drums) and Joshua Perahia re-formed the band as MPIRE. They released one album under this name, Chapter One which turned out to be a huge success in Europe and Asia, though it was never released in the US. The band then expanded its name to Joshua Perahia. The addition of Joshua's last name was to avoid confusion as so many bands were using the name Joshua. Perahia states "We went back (from MPIRE to Joshua) to re-fire.... re-ignite what we had before under pressure from the new label in the US." The band lacked a permanent vocalist and hired Alex Ligertwood of Santana to fill the spot on Something to Say. However, while in production, the band recruited Jerry Gabriel and re-recorded the vocals. As a result, the album (except four tracks) contains Gabriel's lead vocals, and Ligertwood's vocals are available in the DVD release. One song, "Something to say" (by Rochrich, Perahia & Stoskopf), appeared in the Larry Buchanan–directed movie The Copper Scroll of Mary Magdalene in 2004.

== Other projects ==
Members of Joshua have been involved with various other projects. Surrender vocalist Jeff Fenholt was the former lead singer of the broadway musical Jesus Christ Superstar. Beyond his involvement with Jesus Christ Superstar, Fenholt worked briefly with Tony Iommi and Driver and later made regular appearances on the Trinity Broadcasting Network. Frontman Robyn Kyle Basauri was later in the Christian metal band Die Happy and the Badlands offshoot Red Sea. Rob Rock was involved with Impellitteri before and after his work with Joshua. The Christian band Shout was formed in 1987 by three members of Joshua - Joseph Galletta, Loren Robinson, and Ken Tamplin, who also had a successful solo career.

Several members were also in metal bands, mostly based in the LA area. Mahlon Hawk formed Centerfold in 1987 with Kurt Wada. Steve Fontaine briefly replaced Peter Goalby in Uriah Heep, and Rich Ortz later provided vocals for Sixty Nine. Donnie Gougeon joined White Sister and then the Association in 1985, and Emil Lech appeared on the final Sound Barrier album, Speed of Light (1986). He was also in the band Driver, which at one point also included Rob Rock and Greg Shultz.

== Members ==
Former

- Joshua Perahia – guitar (1980–2024)
- Joey Rochrich - bass (1994-2002)
- Mark Boals – vocals (2002–present)
- Dino Maddalone – drums (2002–present)
- Bryan Fleming – bass (1990-1993, 2002–present)
- Scott Warren – keyboards (2002–present)
- Mahlon Hawk – bass (1980–1984)
- Glenn Alsup – keyboards (1980)
- Donnie Gougeon – keyboard (1980–1984)
- Michael Morris – rhythm guitar (1980–1984)
- Anthony Zaccaglin – drums (1980–1984)
- Steve Fontaine – vocals (1980–1984)
- Patrick Bradley – keyboard (1984–1987)
- Joseph Galletta – drums (1984–1987)
- Ken Tamplin – rhythm guitar, vocals (1984–1987)
- Jeff Fenholt – vocals (1984–1987)
- Loren Robinson – bass (1984–1987)
- Rob Rock – vocals (1987–1989)
- Emil Lech – bass (1987–1989)
- Greg Shultz – keyboard (1987–1991)
- Tim Gehrt – drums (1987–1989)
- Larry Cox - drums (1989-1991)
- Robin Kyle Basauri – vocals (1990–1992)
- Michael O'Mara – vocals (1992–1997)
- Erik Norlander – keyboard (1991–1996)
- Jerry Gabriel – vocals (1999–2002)
- Alex Ligertwood – vocals (1999–2002)
- Jason Scheff – vocals (1996–2002)
- Eric Stoskopf – drums (1993–2002)
- Richard Baker – keyboards (1996–2002)

== Discography ==
Studio albums

- The Hand Is Quicker Than The Eye (1984)
- Surrender (1985)
- Intense Defense (1988)
- Surrender 1992 (1992)
- Chapter One (1995)
- Something to Say (2001)
- Resurrection (2012)

EP

- The Hand is Quicker than the Eye (1982)

Compilation albums

- Double Trouble: The Hand Is Quicker Than the Eye & Surrender (1995)
