= Jeff Fenholt =

American musician and actor (1950–2019)

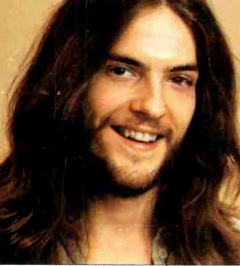

Background information
- Born: Jeffrey Craig Fenholt; September 15, 1950; Columbus, Ohio, United States
- Died: September 10, 2019 (aged 68) Newport Beach, California, United States
- Genres: CCM; Christian rock/metal; hard rock; heavy metal; Garage rock
- Occupations: Musician; singer; actor; evangelist
- Instruments: Guitar; vocals; piano
- Years active: 1970–2019
- Formerly of: Black Sabbath; Joshua; The Fifth Order

Jeffrey Craig Fenholt (September 15, 1950 – September 10, 2019) was an American musician, singer, actor, and televangelist. He was best known for his performance as the title character in the original Broadway production of Jesus Christ Superstar and for his appearance on the cover of Time. In later years, Fenholt gained recognition as a Christian evangelist and singer, as well as controversy over his involvement with the British heavy metal band Black Sabbath.

== Early life ==
Jeffrey Craig Fenholt was born on September 15, 1950, in Columbus, Ohio, to Robert and Janet Fenholt. He had a brother named Tom, and two sisters, Nancy and Melinda. He also had one foster brother, Bill. Fenholt was raised Methodist and became a Roman Catholic convert when he was 16.

Fenholt's parents divorced when he was in grade school. He described his childhood as an abusive one - being beaten, thrown down stairs, slapped, and more. As a result, he began drinking, smoking, and getting into fights. Eventually he would escalate to breaking and entering and stealing cars. He was arrested when he was 12-years-old, after his mother filed charges against him for incorrigibility. Fenholt was taken to juvenile detention. While in juvenile detention, Fenholt met the detention's minister, who would become his legal guardian. While under the minister's care and living in the rectory adjoining his church, Fenholt stated that the man attempted to sexually abuse him. He lived with the man for several weeks before his mother allowed him to return home. He would return to the juvenile center several times due to his mother pressing charges.

He was involved with a number of rock bands and performed at various school functions. Fenholt got his first regional hit recording titled "Goin' Too Far" with his garage rock band, The Fifth Order, when he was a teen. They would appear on multiple occasions on the local television show Channel 4's Dance Party, where they would perform original and cover songs. They would have another successful record with "A Thousand Devils" before breaking up in 1968. Post break-up, the label would release another song, "The Moment," without the band's knowledge and it would go on to be successful locally as well. Fenholt would move out of his mother's home when he was 16 with the money he made from touring.

When Fenholt was 17, he and two friends jumped another boy for allegedly beating up a friend of theirs. Fenholt, wearing steel-toe boots, kicked the boy in the face. He was arrested the following night for a curfew violation and, in an off-hand comment not knowing Fenholt was responsible, the police informed him that the boy was in a coma and would likely die. The boy did recover and when Fenholt ran into him a few months later, he showed no signs of recognizing him. Fenholt was never arrested and believed the boy may have suffered memory loss.

Fenholt attended Ohio State University for two years on a music scholarship and took part in the men's glee club. After an arrest during his freshman year of college, he decided that it was not for him and would eventually leave. He would later earned his B.A. in music at The School of Bible Theology University in San Jacinto, California.

== Career ==
=== 1970-1982: Jesus Christ Superstar and solo music ===
After leaving college, Fenholt began traveling with a friend on tour. He would depart from the friend and began traveling with the company of Hair. A cast member informed him of auditions for Andrew Lloyd Webber and Tim Rice's new musical Jesus Christ Superstar (JCS). Fenholt was cast as Jesus in the original Broadway production at the Mark Hellinger Theatre. The rock-opera musical is loosely based on the Gospel accounts of the Passion. The show opened on October 12, 1971, and received mixed reviews. JCS cast members Carl Anderson and Yvonne Elliman toured with Fenholt on the JCS world tour as Judas Iscariot and Mary Magdalene, respectively. It ran for 711 shows, closing in 1973, and received five Tony Award nominations. Fenholt, Elliman, and the company would also perform as part of the 1972 Tony Awards JCS musical medley. JCS sold in excess of 12 million albums and was nominated in 1973 for Album of the Year at the Grammy Awards.

Despite its musical success, the show received heavy backlash from Christians, who saw the portrayal of Jesus and Mary's relationship as sacrilegious and the portrayal of Judas as a heroic figure. In addition, the American Jewish Committee criticized it, claiming that the show perpetuated stereotypes of "the Jew as Christ killer." Fenholt became heavily addicted to alcohol and drugs following the end of his run on Broadway. Two years into its run, Fenholt began vomiting blood following a show. He was transported to New York University Hospital and according to Fenholt, he only had two pints of blood in his system. He spent several weeks in hospital and refused to return to the show.

Fenholt released several solo recordings, including a successful cover of Graham Nash's "Simple Man"

Fenholt co-founded Entertainment Capital Corporation with Jeff Thornburg, former president of The Robert Stigwood Org, producing Andy Warhol's film, Bad. ECC also produced recordings for Fenholt. Thornburg and Fenholt amicably parted ways when Thornburg accepted the position of head of venture capital for Paramount Pictures.

In the mid-1970s, Fenholt auditioned for the former members of the rock band Alice Cooper, after their lead singer departed for a solo career. Despite finding Fenholt's voice "powerful", the band members ultimately decided that it was "a Broadway voice" and not "the right fit". The band's guitarist Michael Bruce ultimately assumed the role of lead vocalist, with the band (renamed Billion Dollar Babies) releasing one album, Battle Axe, in 1977.

In 1978, Fenholt recorded a disco LP titled Smile for CBS and was paid $300,000. Fenholt also recorded for Capitol Records, Universal, Paramount, Polygram, Polydor, Decca, RCA, and as a youth, Laurie, Diamond and Cameo Parkway. He last recorded for Sony.

=== 1983-1986: Black Sabbath and other bands ===
In 1983, Fenholt moved across the country to Southern California to pursue music, but this time it was for rock and roll. During this period, Fenholt would record demos in the studio with Tony Iommi and members of Black Sabbath as a lead vocalist, but his departure from the group would take place before anything officially materialized.

The Never Say Die book, written by Garry Sharpe-Young, states that a substantial number of recordings were made during Fenholt's time with the group. It is acknowledged that this was a confusing time in the band's history, as singer David Donato had left the band after six months, only having recorded demos. Geezer Butler and Bill Ward had left as well, leaving Iommi as the sole original member.

Manager Don Arden suggested Iommi use Fenholt and tracks were written, mainly by Iommi and Nicholls, for a proposed new album. The book Never Say Die voices opinion from other band members that Fenholt might have been kept in the dark about plans to make an Iommi solo album. Geoff Nicholls has stated that after Fenholt's departure, Iommi wanted to use different singers, including David Coverdale, Steve Marriott, Glenn Hughes, and Rob Halford.

Fenholt says several of his melodies were used in songs that appeared on Seventh Star (and subsequently did not receive credit for them). None of his lyrics were used, as confirmed by comparing the Fenholt demos with the album. Rumors suggesting he only left the project because of supposed personal conflicts with the lyrical material being written and his religious faith are suggested by Fenholt and Geoff Nicholls, who wrote the lyrics.

Fenholt claims it was in fact a physical argument with Arden, along with Iommi's bad habits and proposed dark lyrics that caused his departure. However, Iommi has stated that Fenholt was never an official member of Black Sabbath. Iommi went on to say that he thought Fenholt had a great voice, but it didn't work, due to Fenholt having difficulty in singing "Sabbath" type lyrics and fitting in.

==== Other bands ====
After his time with Iommi, Fenholt would briefly replace Jeff Scott Soto in Driver, a joint project of Rudy Sarzo and Tommy Aldridge. Upon recording several cuts with Driver (one of which, "Rock the World," is in common circulation amongst fans), Fenholt left the project to do a solo tour of South America and was replaced by Rob Rock. Following a legal dispute with another band of the same name, Driver changed its name to M.A.R.S., and guitarist Tony MacAlpine joined the project. The band released only one album, 1986's Project: Driver, before they officially disbanded.

During this period, Fenholt would also audition and record demos with Geezer Butler for his proposed Geezer Butler Band project which never got off the ground. From 1984 to 1987, he would also perform vocals for the Christian metal band, Joshua, and serve as the lead vocalist on their Surrender album.

=== 1987-1997: Conversion to Christianity and evangelism ===
Fenholt's often-repeated testimony details a visit from Christian construction workers working on his home, who confronted him regarding his portrayal of Christ on stage. Fenholt converted to Christianity, abstained from his addictions, spent the next several years struggling to balance his faith and his career, and then became a high-profile personality on Trinity Broadcasting Network (TBN). Fenholt sported long hair, an unusual style in conservative evangelical circles, and he often appeared with his wife, Maureen 'Reeni'. Fenholt built his career as a TBN personality based mostly upon his involvement with Jesus Christ Superstar and Black Sabbath. He would become a regular on The 700 Club and many other TBN shows. He also hosted a weekly musical and testimonial show titled Highway to Heaven.

In 1989, Jeff Fenholt would return to the very same theater where it all started with Jesus Christ Superstar—the Mark Hellinger Theater, but this time it was to dedicate the theater as a new evangelical Pentecostal church in Times Square pastored by David Wilkerson called "Times Square Church".

His ministry went global, with tours and concerts in Italy, South Africa, Australia, New Zealand, South and Central America, and Europe. The international trip to Moscow, Russia in the Olympic Stadium took place with approximately 100,000 people in attendance in communist Russia. He would perform with Christian musicians such as Pat Boone, Debbie Boone, Andraé Crouch, and Phil Driscoll. In May 1989, Fenholt, Nicky Cruz, and Fred Berry would host a 4 day religious revival rally, with each member giving testimonies and/or a performance. Throughout the 90s, Fenholt would tour around the United States. In 1994, was a featured performer in Harmony In the Mountains concert.

In the early 1990s, Fenholt took part in Christian prison ministry and outreach work throughout Texas. There, he met professional wrestler "Superstar" Billy Graham. Fenholt served as a religious mentor to Graham and convinced him to return to ministry. In 1996, Fenholt was Chairman of Youth for a rally called "Washington for Jesus" which took place in Washington D.C., and is reported as drawing nearly 500,000 people. Fenholt raised over $1.7 million to stage the event, donating over $300,000 of his own funds.

His TBN show, Highway to Heaven, was aired around the world and reached millions. Fenholt also had a national and world-wide musical TV program called Standing on the Rock, which aired over 36 satellites covering most of the world. TBN also recorded some of Fenholt's self-composed solo worship albums. His christian music sold in excess of 3.5 million albums, and his Christmas Classics album went platinum. In total, Fenholt received a double-platinum album for Jesus Christ Superstar, plus an additional platinum album and two gold albums in the gospel genre.

=== 1998-2019: Departure from TBN and after ===
In 1998, Fenholt left TBN, except for a few brief appearances, including one after the events of September 11, 2001. This appearance featured a marked change in his demeanor and appearance, including short hair and a quick exit from the stage following his performance. His album of Christian music was TBN's promotion in December 2001. Fenholt recorded five solo albums for TBN, featuring many of his own compositions. These sold in excess of 3.3 million copies. Fenholt earned one Platinum and two Gold albums. He briefly was seen doing a late-night timeslot for a half-hour program. Fenholt stated that after his divorce he had "lost his fire".

Fenholt returned to TBN on March 3, 2004, as a guest on Behind the Scenes, hosted by Paul Crouch. Fenholt mentioned Black Sabbath, citing the book Never Say Die.

In 2004, a German music publisher Break-A-Way Records would release the album Bonfire! The Return of The Fifth Order from Fenholt's teenage band, with a collection their singles and additional previously unreleased songs. Unbeknownst to all band members, their records had been releasing in Europe and gained a following throughout the years, leading to the compliation album.

In 2008, Fenholt was hired as executive producer of the Beijing Olympic concert series. That year, Fenholt reunited with Joshua Perahia of the band Joshua to work on Perahia's new album, Resurrection, however album did not release until 2012.

== Personal life ==
Fenholt met Maureen 'Reeni' McFadden after he spotted her in the crowd of a show he was playing. They went on a date a few months later. The couple married in 1970 and were married for 28 years. They divorced in 1998. He had six children: Shaye, Tristan, Nissa, William, Amory, and Jeffrey.

Fenholt died on September 10, 2019 from an undisclosed cause in Newport Beach, five days before his 69th birthday. A memorial service was held at The Rock in Anaheim, California, on September 28, 2019. The service was attended by family and friends, members of the original Broadway cast of Jesus Christ Superstar, as well as former bandmates associated with Ozzy Osbourne, Whitesnake, and Dio. Pastors and ministers across the country also attended.

=== Abuse ===
Fenholt admitted to abusing McFadden throughout their marriage, with McFadden often wearing sunglasses inside to hide her bruises. In one instance, he stated that while drunk, he beat her unconscious and poured water over her face to see if she would awake, but she did not. He left her on the floor and went to bed. When he awoke the next morning, she had been taken to a hospital and was intensive care. Her kidneys were bruised, and she had a high fever. After learning this information, Fenholt fled to Salvador Dalí's castle in Barcelona, Spain where he stayed for a few weeks. He returned to New York after learning that McFadden had recovered. McFadden filed for separation and an order of protection, both granted by the judge. Fenholt returned to the home eight months later and once again attempted to abuse her just days later. McFadden would retaliate by praying for him.

According to his autobiography, Fenholt also had beaten the family dog, leading to its death.

=== Gala Dali ===
An article in the December 1998 issue of Vanity Fair reviewing Ian Gibson's biography of Salvador Dalí, detailed Fenholt's past as a "boy toy" for Dalí's wife Gala Dalí. The article by John Richardson was titled "Dalí's Demon Bride" and was unsparing in its criticism of both Gala and her husband. The article was not much more kind to Fenholt than it was to Gala; according to the review, Fenholt became Gala's lover when she was in her eighties, and secured in return "a sizable house on Long Island... and large sums of money." Fenholt was outraged at the depiction of Gala, and wrote a scathing letter to the editor, stating the authors had no evidence to substantiate their depiction of Gala.

In his 1994 autobiography, Fenholt describes Dalí and Gala as his "closest friends at the time."

=== Legal issues ===
During his first year of college, Fenholt was arrested after a mass fight broke out during a concert. He was arrested and charged with inciting a riot, assault and battery, and assaulting a police officer. Fenholt's friends gathered money to get him released and he eventually skipped bail.

In 1993, Fenholt announced on the TV program The 700 Club that he planned to do a Halloween concert in an arena in Mount Horeb, Wisconsin. Having advance notification from the attorney general of Massachusetts of his arrival in Wisconsin, Wiccan Priestess Selena Fox (Circle Sanctuary) got a restraining order from the local county court. The order prohibited not only his trespass on private property but also specified that he stay a particular distance from the property line. Fenholt won in court.

Fenholt's 1994 autobiography, From Darkness to Light, reveals that he was abused and mistreated as a youth and subjected to frequent beatings. In 1996, Fenholt's parents sued him, Trinity Broadcasting Network (TBN), and the publisher of his autobiography for $12 million each for defamation of character. Fenholt's siblings claimed he made up the stories of abuse, but the lawsuit subsequently was dropped after Fenholt produced court documents from the superior court of Franklin County, Ohio, confirming his claims. Fenholt later said that he had a "warm relationship" with his mother and family.

== In popular culture ==
Fenholt is portrayed by Zachary Nachbar-Seckel in Mary Harron's biopic Dalíland. The film depicts him as Gala Dalí's self-centered lover, on whom she spends large amounts of money to support his fledgling solo career.

== Discography ==
=== Studio albums ===
- Smile (1978)
- Live (1989)
- Hymns (1991)
- Jesus - 50s (1992)
- Celtic Glory (1998)
- Sings the Sacred Classics (2001)
- Sings the Christmas Classics (2003)
- Praise & Worship (2005)
- Jeff Fenholt Sings (2005)

=== Soundtrack albums ===
- Jesus Christ Superstar (Original Broadway Cast) (1971)

=== Other work ===
- Surrender by Joshua (1985) (lead vocalist)
- Bonfire! Return of The Fifth Order by The Fifth Order (2004)

=== Singles ===
Title	Year	Album	Project	Ref.
"Going Too Far / Walkin' Away"		Non-album single	The Fifth Order	
"A Thousand Devils / Today (I Got A Letter)"	1967	Non-album single	The Fifth Order	
"The Moment (I Saw You) / I Was A Fool"	1968	Non-album single	The Fifth Order	
"Simple Man"	1972	Non-album single	Solo	
"Billy Is Dead"	1972	Non-album single	Solo	
"Get It Up"	1973	Non-album single	Solo	
"How Do You Love A Woman"	1973	Non-album single	Solo	
"I Need You"	1978	Non-album single	Solo	
