= Majestica =

Swedish metal band

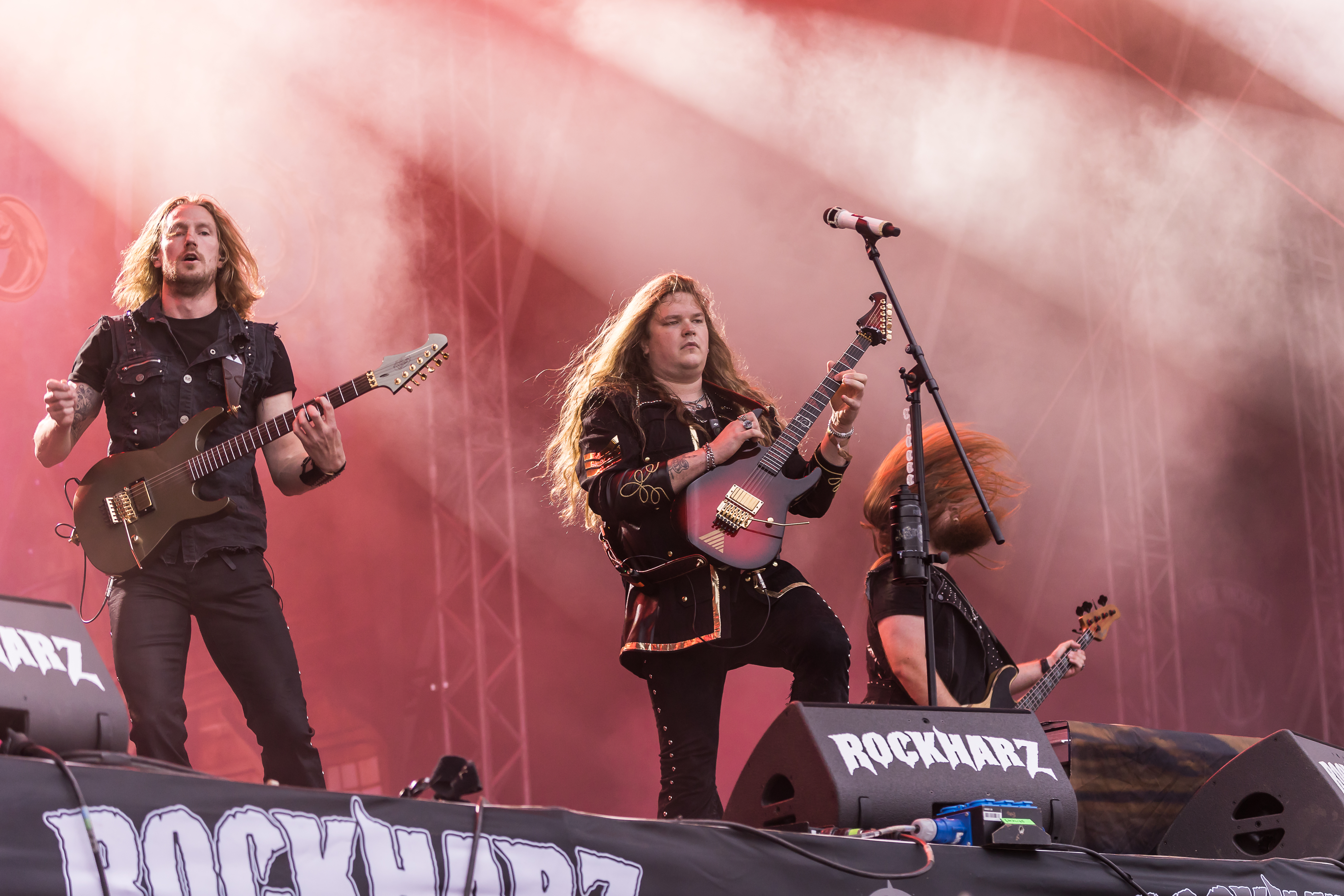
- Majestica at Rockharz 2026

Background information
- Also known as: ReinXeed
- Origin: Boden, Sweden
- Genres: Power metal; symphonic metal
- Years active: 2000–present
- Labels: DooLittle Group AB; Rivel; Nuclear Blast
- Members: Tommy Johansson; Chris David; Joel Kollberg; Petter Hjerpe
- Past members: Mattias Johansson; Calle Sundberg; Nic Svensson; Viktor Olofsson; Pontus Allebo; Robin Sjogren; Linus Eriksson; Kerry Lundberg; Ace Thunder; Erik Forsgren; Henrik Fellermark; Alfred Fridhagen; Alex Oriz

Majestica (formerly ReinXeed) is a Swedish symphonic power metal band from Boden. They were formed in 2000 by vocalist Tommy Johansson. They are influenced by soundtrack focused films such as The Lord of the Rings and bands like Helloween with Michael Kiske, Stratovarius and Rhapsody of Fire.

In 2008, Majestica (under the name ReinXeed) released their first studio album The Light with Rivel Records. This helped the band land an appearance in Japan where they gained fans. They have released nine full studio albums.

== History ==
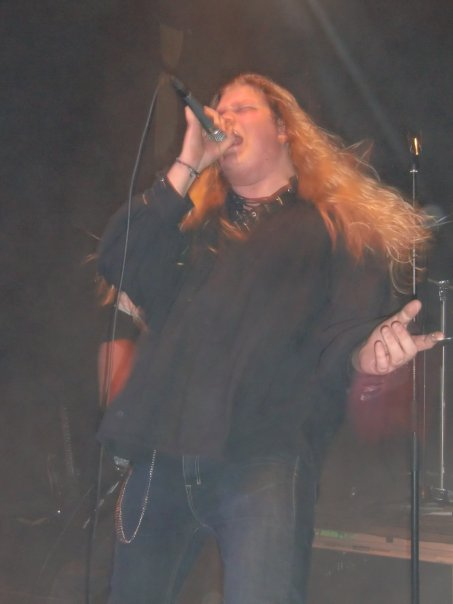
Tommy Johansson singing

Majestica (originally known as ReinXeed) was created by Tommy Johansson in Boden, Sweden. ReinXeed was originally Johansson's solo project and on the debut album, The Light, he played every instrument. Daniel Eskilsson, the drummer, and band leader of the Swedish melodic power metal band Majestic Vanguard, heard early versions of the songs Johansson posted to his MySpace page and put him in touch with Christian Liljegren of Rivel Records / CM Sweden. Jani Stefanovic co-produced and mixed the album and handled all the drums on the album. It was released on 12 March 2008 in Japan, 6 June in Europe, via Rivel Records.

The album allowed Johansson to recruit a band with two guitarists, Kerry Lundberg and Mattias Johansson, keyboardist Henrik Fellermark, drummer Erik Forsgren and bassist Ace Thunder to record and release Higher.

The band's next album, 1912, is a concept album about the Titanic and its sinking. The Japanese edition includes three bonus tracks: "ReinXeed Alliance", "Aces High" (an Iron Maiden cover) and "Pray for Japan", a song written and recorded to support Japan in the aftermath of the 11 March 2011 earthquake and tsunami. Welcome to the Theater was released in May 2012. A New World was released in 2013 with a new line up.

Shortly after that Tommy decided to take a break from music completely, and one year later him, Chris and Alexander decided to "get back on the horse again" and started to write new songs. In 2018 they performed at the Sabaton Open Air festival in Sweden. This was their first show in 5 years and was also the last show as ReinXeed because they decided they needed a fresh start as a band included a new name.

The band changed their name in 2019 from ReinXeed to Majestica upon their signing with record label Nuclear Blast Records.

The album Above The Sky was announced to be released on 7 June 2019. In the buildup to the release of the album, lyric videos for the songs Rising Tide and Night Call Girl were made available.

The same day the album was released, an official music video for the title track was also released. With regard to that song in particular, Tommy says "that song is completely about Power Metal. How Power Metal is the best music in the world, and how it makes you feel when you listen to it. It's also a tribute to one of the best songs in the world, 'Eagle Fly Free' [by Helloween.]"

In October 2020, their next album was announced. "A Christmas musical power metal album A Christmas Carol. It's pure symphonic power metal in the true Majestica spirit along with elements inspired by the likes of Twilight Force, Rhapsody, Alan Silvestri, Danny Elfman and John Williams.

With regards to the musical direction for the album he added, "Once again people can expect real power metal, but this time it's a bit more symphonic and epic compared to our previous album Above the Sky. When it comes to the symphonic parts we've taken it a bit further and included a lot more orchestral instruments, including tubular bells, glockenspiel and sleigh bells to really get that Christmas sound to it.

Ahead of the A Christmas Carol album being released, music videos for the songs Ghost of Christmas Past and Ghost of Marley were made available. The album was released on 4 December 2020 as was an official music video for the song The Joy of Christmas.

In early 2021 a European tour described as "a unique 'Power Metal meets Musical' staging of A Christmas Carol by Charles Dickens." was announced to take place in December 2021.

In June 2021, a digital 2-track single featuring live performances from the second of two shows they played in Tokyo in early 2020 was released. The two songs being Above the Sky and Welcome to the Theatre (the title track of the 2012 ReinXeed album). An official live music video capturing the performance of 'Above The Sky' was released as well.

The Swedish band Metalite fired their drummer Lea Larsson in 2024; Joel Kollberg temporarily replaced her during the scheduled concerts of the band. However, Metalite does not consider him as a candidate to be their permanent drummer: they do not want to deprive Majestica of their member, and do not consider him capable to cope with the duties of being in two bands at the same time.

== Band members ==
Current

- Tommy "ReinXeed" Johansson – lead guitar, lead vocals, keyboards
- Chris David – bass, backing vocals
- Joel Kollberg – drums
- Petter Hjerpe – rhythm guitar
Majestica, band members at Rockharz 2026

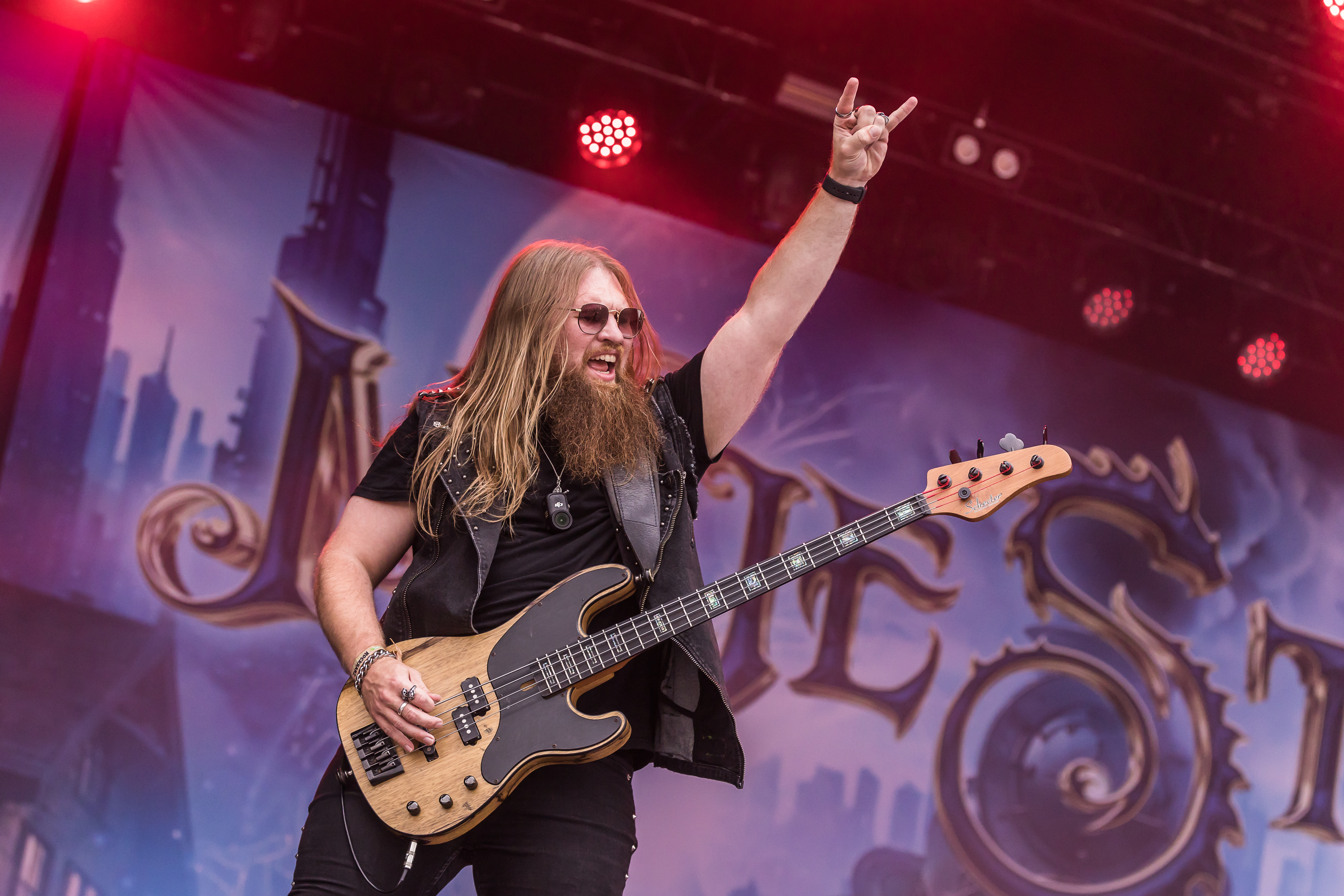
Chris David, bass

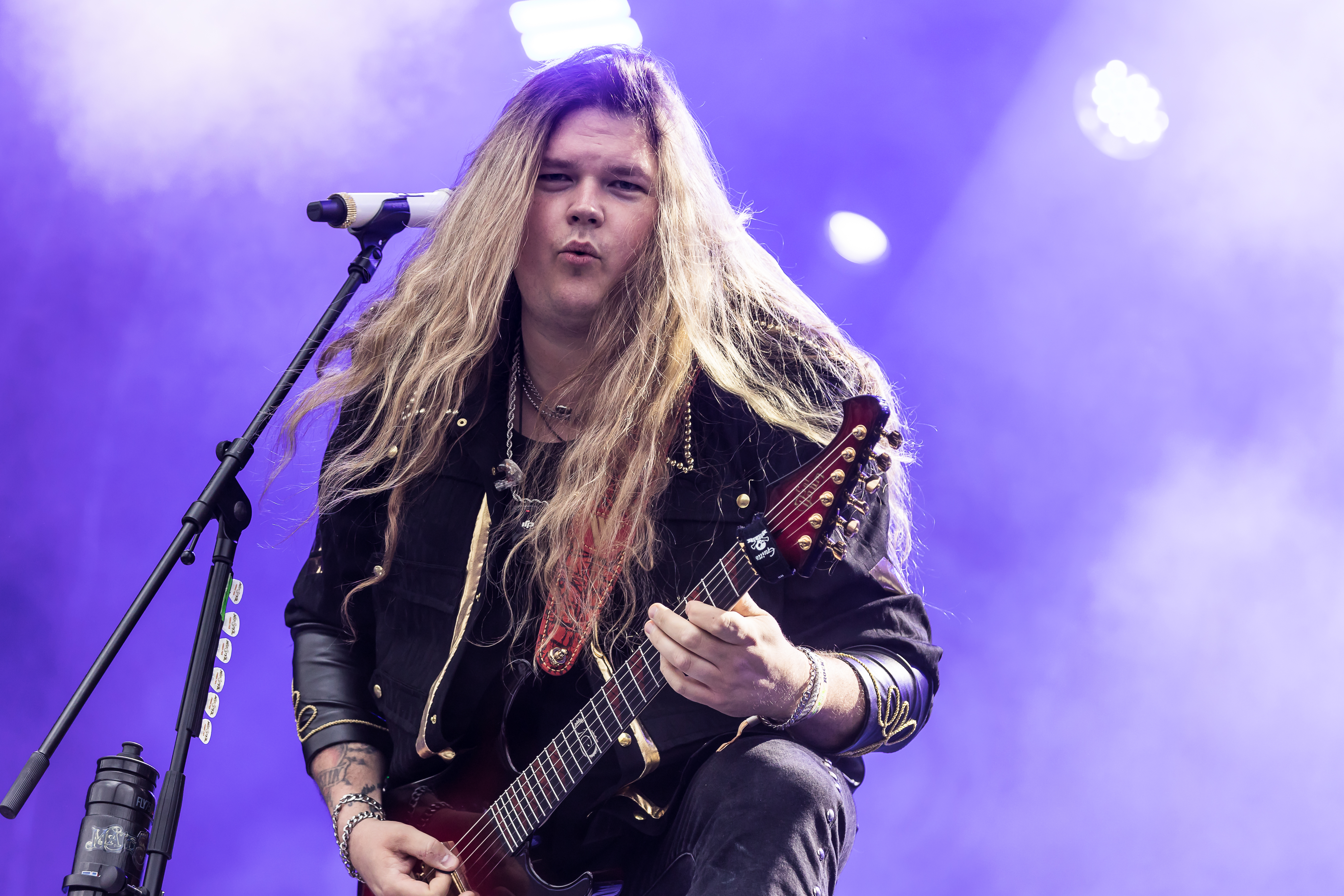
Tommy "ReinXeed" Johansson, lead guitar, vocals

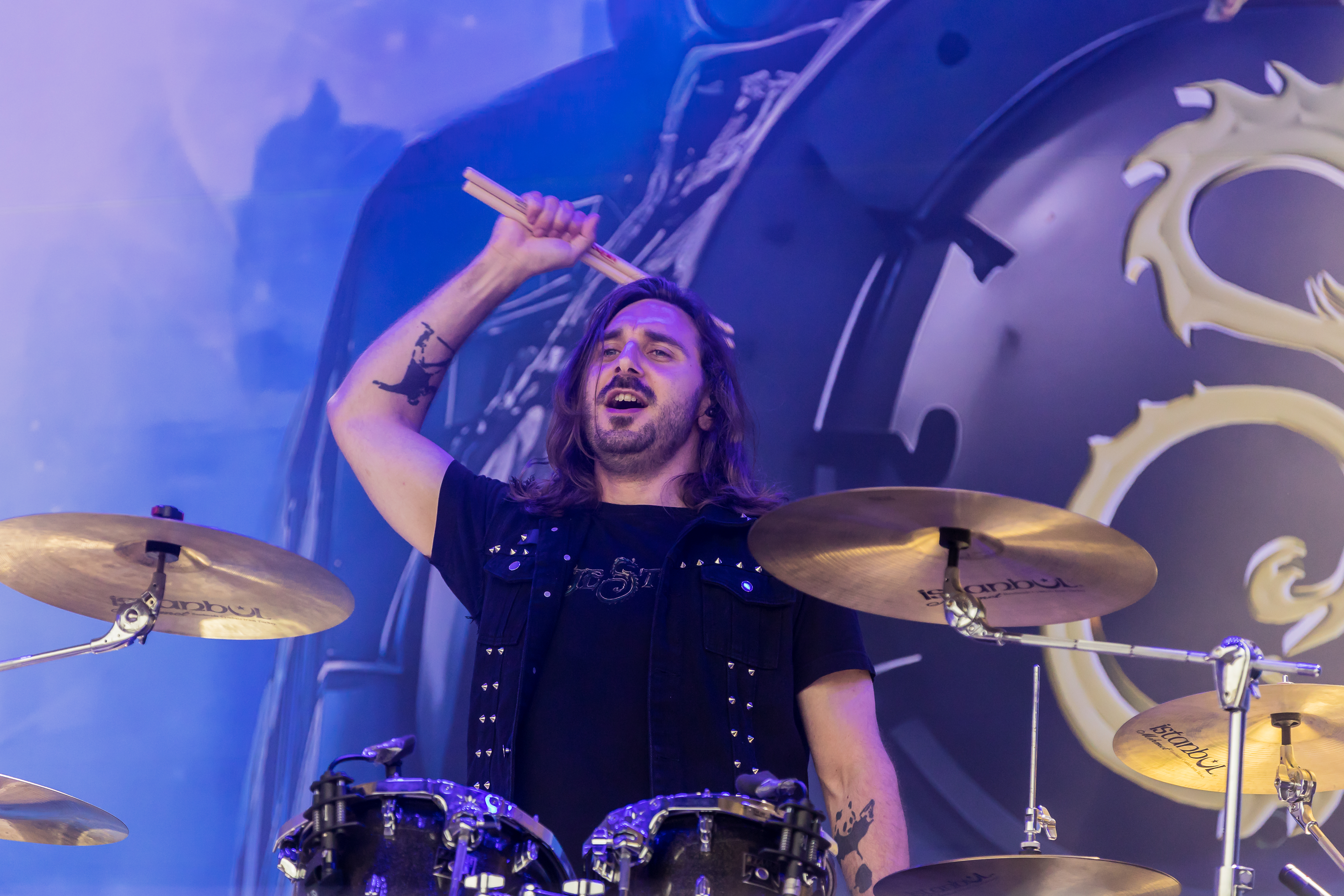
Joel Kollberg, drums

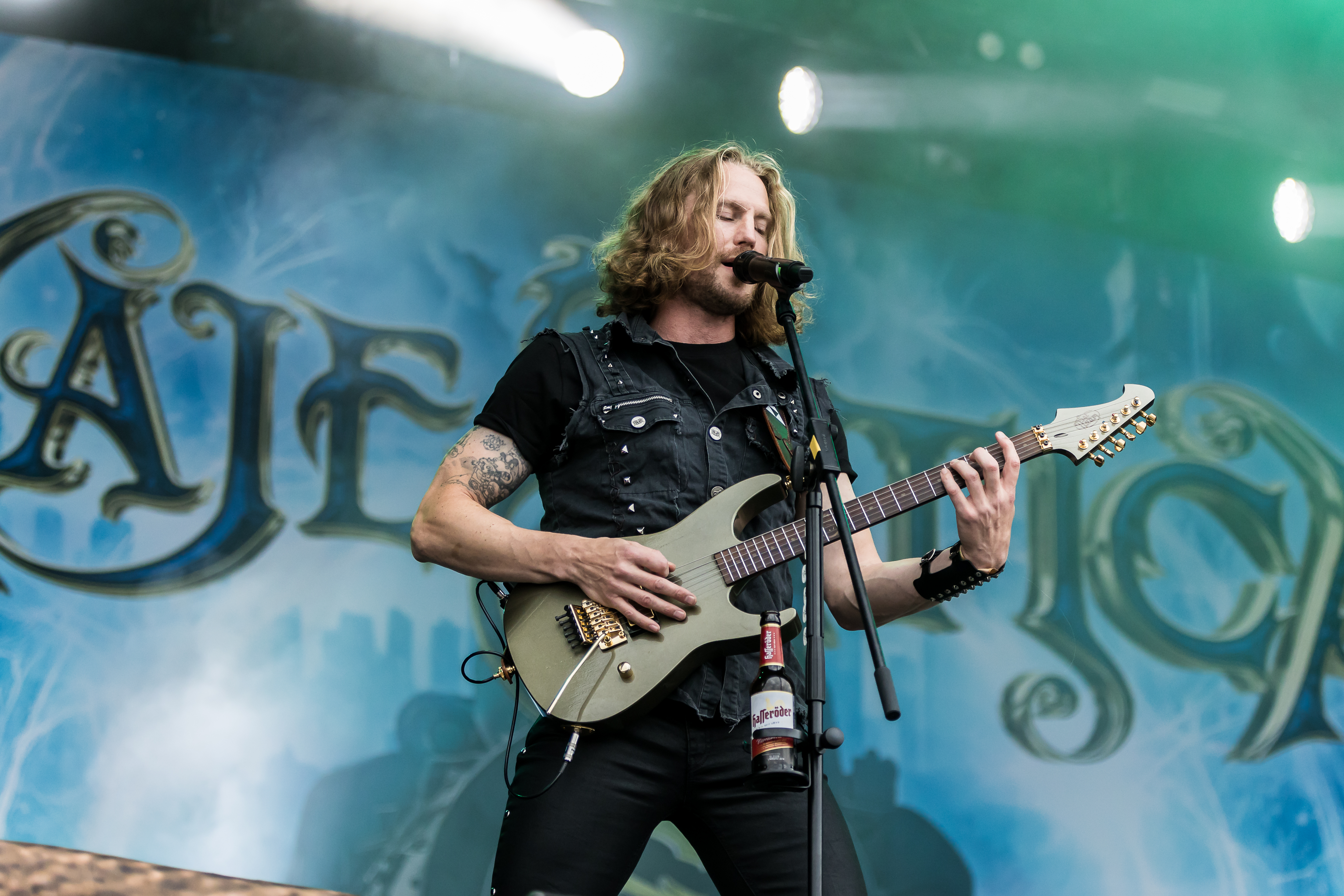
Petter Hjerpe, guitar

Former

- Uli Kusch – drums
- Alexander Oriz – rhythm guitar, backing vocals (2012–2021)

== Discography ==
=== As ReinXeed ===
- The Light (2008)
- Higher (2009)
- Majestic (2010)
- 1912 (2011)
- Welcome to the Theater (2012)
- A New World (2013)

On compilation albums

- Swedish Hitz Goes Metal (2011)
- Swedish Hitz Goes Metal Vol.2 (2013)

=== As Majestica ===
- Above the Sky (2019)
- A Christmas Carol (2020)
- A Christmas Carol (Extended Version) (2021)
- Power Train (2025)
