= Garden of Chaos =

Studio album by Rob Rock
- Released: August 22, 2007
- Genres: Heavy metal, power metal, Christian metal
- Length: 46:43
- Labels: Candlelight (North America); AFM Records (Europe); JVC/Victor (Asia)
- Producers: Carl Johan Grimmark k, Roy Z, Rob Rock

Rob Rock chronology
Holy Hell (2005)	Garden of Chaos (2007)

Professional ratings
Review scores
Source	Rating
AllMusic	3.5/5 stars
Metal.de	4/10

Garden of Chaos is a heavy metal album released in 2007 by Rob Rock. It is his fourth solo release. Garden of Chaos is the fourth solo studio album by American heavy metal vocalist Rob Rock, released in 2007. The album is part of Rock’s solo discography and reflects his continued work within the heavy metal genre following his earlier studio releases.

== Track listing ==
1. "Garden of Chaos" (3:49)
2. "Satan's Playground" (4:37)
3. "Savior's Call" (3:46)
4. "This Time Is the Last Time" (4:46)
5. "Only a Matter of Time" (4:24)
6. "Spirit in the Sky" (4:07)
7. "Metal Breed" (3:58)
8. "Millennial Reign" (4:30)
9. "Unconditional" (4:57)
10. "Ride the Wind" (3:49)
11. "Ode to Alexander" (3:19)

== Credits ==
- Rob Rock - lead and backing vocals
- Liza Shekhter - backing vocals and keyboards
- Carl Johan Grimmark - guitars
- Mistheria - keyboards
- Andreas Olsson - bass
- Andreas Johansson - drums
- Roy Z - guitars, bass
- Gus G. - Guitar Solo on "Ride the Wind"
- Bob Rossi - guitar solo on "Metal Breed"
- Peter Hallgren - Guitar Solos on "Savior's Call" and "Millennial Reign"
- Bobby Jarzombek - Drums on "Ride the Wind" and "This Time is the Last Time"
