= Negative B =

Studio album by Sanctifica
- Released: March 2002
- Recorded: 2001
- Genre: Progressive death metal, avant-garde metal
- Length: 56:31
- Label: Rivel Records
- Producer: Carl Johan Grimmark

Sanctifica chronology
Spirit of Purity (2000)	Negative B (2002)

Negative B is the second and last album by the Swedish band Sanctifica, released on Rivel Records in 2002. This album saw the band abandoning their previous black metal style for a more alternative, electronic, avantgarde, experimental, progressive death metal sound. The album received mixed reviews: some found the album too bizarre, unfocused and unbalanced, while others praised it for its unique style. Many fans of Sanctifica's old style were disappointed on the drastic style change, but Negative B brought the band a new group of fans from the progressive metal crowd.

== Recording ==
Presumably tired of their "Emperor clone" label, by 2001 the band left black metal and evolved to a more experimental, progressive death metal act. Later that year, Sanctifica entered a studio to record Negative B. Produced by the guitar virtuoso Carl Johan Grimmark, Negative B turned out to be a concept album about social issues. The band recorded the album in 4 months and released it in March 2002. David Seiving of Crimson Moonlight sung guest vocals on "Stardust Inc." The album contains a pregap of 9min 20sec of hidden content, presumably the band members talking.

The album is characterized by technical riffing, vocals shared between mostly clean vocals and some death growls, and experimenting with studio effects, including clapping hands, cellphone ringtones, cable noises etc. The album also includes a variety of instruments atypical of metal such as flute and mandolin. The flute is used such many times on the album that some previous fans began calling the band "Sanctiflutica." The song "Stardust Inc.", considered by some critics as the best song on the album, contains keyboards typical for the horror punk genre. As opposed to the previous brutal style, several songs lean more towards ballad feel rather than dark metal. Lyrically, the album takes stances on social issues and society, such as European Union.

== Reception ==
Negative B gained mixed reviews for its bizarreness. Several critics considered it to be unique, at parts even "brilliant," but some reviewers called the style unbalanced and unfocused, claiming that the songs on the second half of the album, especially "Juxtapose" trilogy, lacked a proper structure or that the band had clearly great ideas but could not ration them convincingly. However, it was praised for its technically proficient musicianship. The album contains such a wide variety of musical elements that some critics thought the style is impossible to label or to compare to other musical ensembles. Hubertus Liljegren was cited by a critic as a talented guitarist but considered a decent vocalist at best, compared to the more acclaimed performance of David Seiving.

== Tour ==
Despite gaining mixed reviews, Sanctifica received fairly good promotion for the album, opening them the opportunity to tour Scandinavia to support the album's sales. During the concerts following the album's release, Björn Isacsson played all guitar parts for a while, letting Hubertus perform vocals. In May, David Seiving of Crimson Moonlight joined as a vocalist, and Hubertus concentrated on playing guitar. Sanctifica played a number of concerts at different festivals in Scandinavia during the summer 2002. Some concerts included a performance by the dancer Lovisa Lindström.

In the beginning of October, Sanctifica played a tour in Finland, performing at rock clubs of Turku, Helsinki and Jyväskylä. Afterwards, Hubertus left the band, and Sactifica split up in 2003.

== Track listing ==
No.	Title	Length
0.	"Hidden Track One Audio"	9:20
1.	"Labels"	5:58
2.	"Stardust Inc."	7:28
3.	"Nerve"	4:40
4.	"Lavender"	7:50
5.	"Epitaph"	7:54
6.	"Red Alert"	6:33
7.	"Juxtapose I. As A Reminder"	3:34
8.	"Juxtapose II. Confront"	6:09
9.	"Juxtapose III. Summer Sits Here Raining"	6:10
