= Thunderchild =

Thunderchild, Thunder Child or variant, may refer to:

- Thunderchild First Nation, a Cree tribe and Indian reserve in Saskatchewan, Canada
- HMS Thunder Child, a fictional Royal Navy ironclad torpedo steam ram in the H.G. Wells novel The War of the Worlds
  - Thunder Child, a song about the ship from the 1978 album Jeff Wayne's Musical Version of The War of the Worlds
- Thunderchild, an album by James Ash, and the stagename listed on the album
- Thunder Child, a stagename for heavy metal band Warlord musician Mark Zonder
- Thunderchild, a character from Dick Tracy comics
- Operation Thunder Child, a novel

== See also ==
- Children of the Thunder, a 1988 novel by John Brunner
- Sons of Thunder (disambiguation)
