= Paradox (British band) =

British Christian black metal band

- Origin: London, England
- Genres: Black metal, Christian metal, death metal
- Years active: 1996–2002
- Label: Tarantula
- Past members: Michael (a.k.a. John Tarantula); Grey (a.k.a. The Invocator); Jasen (a.k.a. White Stick); Jeff (a.k.a. Death Warrior); Sam (a.k.a. Yellow Terror); Rose (a.k.a. Dark Faery); Michael's brother Michael's father
- Website: paradoxuk.tripod.com

Paradox were a Christian black metal band founded in London, England, in 1996 by guitarist and vocalist Michael, using the pseudonym "John Tarantula". At the time, they were reportedly the only Christian dark metal band in London. Originally a three-piece, they released the demo The Outcasts in 1997 through their own record label, Tarantula Promotions. In 1998, a vocalist joined and they released a second demo in 2000, Through Pain There Is Joy. Following this release, Michael reformed the band as a five-piece unit, and a sixth member joined part-time on keyboards. In 2002, Paradox disbanded, releasing their last two songs on compilation album Overcome or Burn Forever in Hell/Arachnid Terror Sampler, with tracks from fourteen other artists. Following the breakup, the projects Bloodshed and Slimegem were formed, and Tarantula Promotions promoted a third band, Hamal 'ak Hamashith.

== History ==
Michael stated that, before becoming a Christian, he was in a band that played covers of Burzum, Darkthrone, Acheron, Beherit, and Havohej. In 1995, Michael converted to Christianity at a summer camp. His original band split, and in 1996, he formed Paradox with his father and brother. They chose the name because of the paradox of a Christian band playing dark music. That year, the band released the demo The Outcasts. UK-based Cross Rhythms Magazine rated the demo six out of ten squares. Singer Grey "The Invocator" joined in 1998. According to Michael, Grey was not a Christian, but was comfortable with the band's goals. A second demo, Through Pain There Is Joy, followed in 2000, which Cross Rhythms rated seven out of ten squares, and stated that the band was the "London's only dark metal band who are out there doing it for Christ." After this demo, Michael reformed Paradox with drummer Jasen "White Stick", bassist Jeff "Death Warrior", Sam "Yellow Terror" on guitar, and Grey. In 2000, Rose "Dark Faery" joined as a part-time keyboardist. The band started recording at a professional studio, but announced in 2002 that they would dissolve with the release of their final two songs on Overcome or Burn Forever in Hell/Arachnid Terror Sampler. This split release combined an EP, Overcome or Burn Forever in Hell, by Paradox, and a sampler album, Arachnid Terror Sampler, featuring fourteen other artists such as Frosthardr, Frost Like Ashes, Kekal, Pantokrator, Sanctifica, Soul Embraced, and Tortured Conscience. Following the breakup, Michael announced the formation of Bloodshed and Slimegem.

== Style and influences ==
The band self-described their style as "Holy Black Sludge", a mixture of death, black, and doom metal. Critics have described the band as black metal, dark metal, and death metal. Michael has cited his influences as mostly material that he listened to before converting Christianity, listing Cathedral's Forest of Equilibrium, Mental Funeral by Autopsy, Unholy's The Second Ring of Power, Beherit's Drawing Down the Moon, Into Darkness by Winter, "most of" My Dying Bride, Havohej, Abruptum, and the vocals of Burzum.

== Tarantula Promotions ==
All the material by Paradox was self-released through Tarantula Promotions, that is managed by Michael. Following the breakup of the band, Tarantula Promotions featured two new bands, Bloodshed and Slimegem, and a friend of Michael started the band Hamal 'ak Hamashith, "which is ancient Hebrew for 'destroying angel'", under the label. The label also signed a distribution deal with Nordic Mission for the UK. Michael also published a newsletter, Fangs of Life, through Tarantula. He stated that one of the goals of this newsletter was to spread information about bands with positive lyrics, and was one of the main reasons for the release of the Arachnid Terror Sampler.

== Discography ==
- The Outcasts (1997)
- Through Pain There Is Joy (2000)
- Overcome or Burn Forever in Hell/Arachnid Terror Sampler (2002)

== Lineup ==
Final Line-Up

- Michael "John Tarantula" (1996–2002) – guitar, vocals
- Grey "The Invocator" (1998–2002) – vocals
- Jasen "White Stick" (2000–2002) – drums
- Jeff "Death Warrior" (2000–2002) – bass guitar
- Sam "Yellow Terror" (2000–2002) – lead guitar
- Rose "Dark Faery" (2000–2002) – keyboards

Former

- Michael's brother (1996–2000) – drums
- Michael's father (1996–2000) – bass
