= Tortured Conscience =

American Christian extreme metal band

- Origin: San Francisco, California
- Genres: Christian metal, death metal, grindcore
- Years active: 2000-present
- Labels: Sound of the Dead, Tarantula, Bombworks, Battlefrost
- Members: Jeff Lenormand
- Past members: Shannon Frye; Paul Pontikoff; Berto Salas; John Gotelli
- Website: Tortured Conscience on Facebook

Tortured Conscience is a Christian metal band from San Francisco, California.

== History ==
Tortured Conscience formed in 2000 with just two members: Jeff Lenormand on guitars and bass, and Shannon Frye on drums and vocals. In 2001, the band released their first demo, Faces of God. The demo was re-released in 2002 through The Collection Vol. 1: Tools of the Trade, a split release with Royal Anguish and Soul of the Savior.

In 2002, Sounds of the Dead (SOTD) Records, released A Brutal Christmas: The Season in Chaos, a compilation of Christmas songs covered by Christian metal bands. Tortured Conscience appeared on the compilation, alongside bands Kekal, Frost Like Ashes, Royal Anguish and Death Requisite, recording the song "The Little Drummer Boy". Tarantula Promotions released a sampler, titled Arachnid Terror Sampler for to promote some artists they had worked with, including Tortured Conscience, Soul Embraced, Frosthardr, and Sanctifica.

In 2006, the band released their debut album, Every Knee Shall Bow, via Bombworks Records. By this time, the lineup consisted of Jeff Lenormand on guitars and bass, John Gotelli on drums, and Berto Salas on vocals.

Current

- Jeff Lenormand - Guitars/Bass (2000–present)

Former

- Berto Salas - Vocals (2004-2010)
- Paul Pontikoff - Vocals (2002)
- Shannon Frye - Drums/Vocals (2000-2002)
- John Gotelli - Drums (2002-2015)

== Discography ==
Studio albums

- Every Knee Shall Bow (2006; Bombworks)

Demos

- Faces of God (2001)

Splits

- The Collection Vol. 1: Tools of the Trade (2002; w/ Royal Anguish and Soul of the Savior)

Compilation appearances

- A Brutal Christmas: The Season in Chaos (2002; SOTD)
- Arachnid Terror Sampler (2002; Tarantula)
- Christian Brutal Death Metal: Vol. 1 (2015)
