= Sanctifica =

Swedish band

- Origin: Sweden
- Genres: Unblack metal Progressive death metal
- Years active: 1996–2003
- Labels: Rivel Records, Little Rose Productions
- Past members: Hubertus Liljegren; Daniel Thelin; Alexander Orest; Jonathan Jansson; Henrik Georgsson; Aron Engberg; David Seiving
- Website: Sanctifica.com

Sanctifica was a Swedish unblack metal band that formed in 1996 and disbanded in 2003. After releasing the EP In the Bleak Midwinter in 1997, they were considered a leading modern Christian black metal band in the early 2000s with the album Spirit of Purity. Signed to Swedish Rivel Records and Finnish Little Rose Productions, the band played progressive death metal on their second and last album, Negative B. They toured Scandinavia to support that album, performing at well-known rock clubs in important cities. Hubertus Liljegren went on to join Crimson Moonlight, while the rest formed rock group As a Reminder.

== History ==
In 1996, Hubertus Liljegren (guitars) and Daniel Thelin (drums) formed Sanctifica, and were joined by Alexander Orest (bass). The band played death metal until Orest switched to keyboards and Jonathan Jansson took over on bass, giving them a more black metal sound.

During late 1997, Sanctifica recorded the Scandinavian black metal demo tape In the Bleak Midwinter, and released it in early 1998. Afterwards, Henrik Georgsson joined the band as a second guitar player.

By 1999, Orest was replaced with Aron Engberg. The band's sound changed from atmospheric to chaotic black metal. Sanctifica went to Studio Berghen to record its first full-length with producer Mick Nordström.

Little Rose Productions and Rivel Records (then C.L. Music & Publishing) released the debut album Spirit of Purity in March 2000. Following the release, Sanctifica played in Sweden, Norway, and Finland.

By 2001, the band evolved into an experimental, progressive death metal act. Later that year, Sanctifica recorded the concept album Negative B with producer Carl Johan Grimmark in four months, and released it in March 2002.

During the concerts following the album's release, Björn Isacsson played all guitar parts while Liljegren sang. In May, David Sieving of Crimson Moonlight joined as a vocalist, and Liljegren focused on guitar. Sanctifica played at different festivals in Scandinavia during the summer 2002. Some concerts included dancer Lovisa Lindström.

In 2002, the band was part of a sampler for Tarantula Promotions, titled Arachnid Terror Sampler, which featured bands such as Soul Embraced, Tortured Conscience, Frosthardr and Frost Like Ashes.

In the beginning of October, Sanctifica played a tour in Finland, performing at rock clubs of Turku, Helsinki and Jyväskylä. Afterwards. Hubertus left the band.

Sanctifica disbanded in 2003. Hubertus Liljegren went to join Crimson Moonlight, while the rest formed a group called As a Reminder.

== Style ==
Evolving from their death metal roots to black metal, their early music is characterized by technical, melodic tremolo riffs, mid-range shrieks or high-pitched growls, symphonic keyboards, cold, chaotic yet tight controlled soundscapes, obscurely mixed drum sounds and slow to fast-paced tempo arrangements. The style heard on Negative B contains unconventional song structures, experimental sound samples of clapping hands, cellphone ringtones and cable sounds to name a few, and technical and elaborate riffing. The vocals on that album were dominated by the clean voice while incorporating some death growls of Hubertus as well. Sanctifica did not adapt the visual side of black metal, preferring the more everyday look.

== Reception ==
The first EP, In the Bleak Midwinter received positive reviews. Spirit of Purity was mostly well-received, gaining rave reviews and some calling it a "masterpiece." However, the band was also quickly dubbed as an "Emperor clone" because of the similarities in their sound. The album was criticized for too chaotic output, lacking memorability, and bad drum mixing. Negative B got mixed reviews for its bizarre entity: Several critics considered it to be unique, at parts even "brilliant,"> but some reviewers called the style unbalanced and unfocused, claiming that the songs on the second half of the album lacked a proper structure. However, it was praised for its technically proficient musicianship.

== Discography ==
Demo

- In the Bleak Midwinter (1998)

Splits

- In the Bleak Midwinter / Songs of Solomon (2001; Split w/ Pantokrator)

Studio albums

- Spirit of Purity (2000)
- Negative B (2002)

== Members ==
Last Known Lineup

Members	Instruments	Other projects
Hubertus Liljegren	guitar, vocals	Crimson Moonlight, Oblivion, The Malice
Daniel Thelin	drums, percussion	As a Reminder
Henrik Georgsson	guitar, vocals	As a Reminder
Jonathan Jansson	bass, vocals	Skogen, Pantokrator, Crimson Moonlight, Litania, As a Reminder
Aron Engberg	keyboards	Ayenna, Mercenary, As a Reminder
David Sieving	vocals	Crimson Moonlight, As a Reminder

Former members

Members	Instruments	Other projects
Alexander Orest	keyboards, bass	Crimson Moonlight
