= Harmony (Swedish band) =

Swedish band

- Origin: Borås, Sweden
- Genres: Christian metal, progressive metal, power metal
- Years active: 2000–present
- Labels: Massacre, Ulterium
- Members: Daniel Heiman; Markus Sigfridsson; Raphael Dafras; John Svensson; Tobias Enbert
- Past members: Henrik Båth; Andreas Olsson; Magnus Holmberg
- Website: harmonymetal.net

Harmony is a Swedish Christian metal band from Borås, Sweden, where they formed in 2000. They have released three studio albums, Dreaming Awake (2003), Chapter II: Aftermath (2008), and Theatre of Redemption (2014), and two extended plays, End of My Road (2008) and Remembrance (2015).

== Background ==
Harmony is a progressive power metal band from Borås, where they formed in 2000. Its former members are vocalist Henrik Båth, bassist Andreas Olsson, and keyboardist Magnus Holmberg. The band's current members are vocalist Daniel Heiman, guitarist Markus Sigfridsson, bassist Raphael Dafras, keyboardist John Svensson, and drummer Tobias Enbert.

== Music history ==
Harmony's first studio album, Dreaming Awake, released in April 2003, was its only recording with Massacre Records. The subsequent extended play, End of My Road, was released on August 11, 2008, from Ulterium Records. Harmony released Chapter II: The Aftermath, on October 31, 2008, with Ulterium Records. Its third studio album, Theatre of Redemption, was released on December 2, 2014, by Ulterium Records. The second extended play, Remembrance, was released on May 22, 2015, from Ulterium Records.

== Members ==
Current members

- Daniel Heiman – lead vocals (2010–present)
- Markus Sigfridsson – guitar (2000–present)
- Raphael Dafras – bass (2014–present)
- John Svensson – keyboards (2014–present)
- Tobias Enbert – drums (2000–present)

Former members

- Henrik Båth – lead vocals (2000–2010)
- Andreas Olsson – bass (2002–2014)
- Magnus Holmberg – keyboards (2002–2014)

== Discography ==
Studio albums

- Dreaming Awake (April 2003, Massacre)
- Chapter II: The Aftermath (October 31, 2008, Ulterium)
- Theatre of Redemption (December 2, 2014, Ulterium)

EPs

- End of My Road (August 11, 2008, Ulterium)
- Remembrance (May 22, 2015, Ulterium)
