= Overcome or Burn Forever in Hell/Arachnid Terror Sampler =

2002 extended play by Paradox

Compilation album (extended play and sampler album) by Paradox and Various Artists
- Released: 2002
- Genre: Extreme metal
- Length: 71:59
- Label: Tarantula
- Compiler: Michael "John Tarantula"

Paradox chronology
Through Pain There Is Joy (2000)	Overcome or Burn Forever in Hell/Arachnid Terror Sampler (2002)

Professional ratings
Review scores
Source	Rating
Cross Rhythms Magazine	6/10 stars
Imperiumi	6-/10
Matt Morrow	8.5/10 stars

Overcome or Burn Forever in Hell/Arachnid Terror Sampler is an EP by black metal band Paradox combined with a sampler album featuring fourteen different artists, released in 2002 by the band's own Tarantula Promotions label. Limited to five hundred copies, it contains two songs by Paradox, which were the final recordings of that band, along with a compilation of fourteen songs previously recorded by their respective artists. The album's musical style was described as extreme metal, with the various genres on the album falling under black metal, death metal, grindcore, deathcore, and doom metal. Apart from Paradox, the other artists represented on the album include Soul Embraced, Sanctifica, Frosthardr, Frost Like Ashes, Kekal, Pantokrator, and Tortured Conscience, among others. According to Paradox founder Michael "John Tarantula", the release was a result of his newsletter project, Fangs of Life, which he published through his Tarantula Promotions label.

== Critical reception ==
Overcome or Burn Forever in Hell received moderate praise from critics: Cross Rhythms gave the album six out of ten squares, Imperiumi rated the album a six-minus out of ten, and HM Magazine writer Matt Morrow rated the album eight-and-a-half out of ten. Cross Rhythms labelled the Paradox tracks as "average", and stated that "much of the extreme metal on the remainder of the disc is both a sonic quagmire and structural disaster." However, the appearances of Soul Embraced and Kekal were praised by the reviewer as the highlights of the album, mentioning that both artists "would be worthy competitors in the mainstream market." The reviewer also bestowed praise on Inversion, calling that band's track "a satisfying death-core nugget that is close to perfect, save for its meandering and lifeless finale". However, the songs by Ganglia, Sanctifica, and Encryptor were criticised. Matt Morrow was more favourable to the album, criticising the material by Paradox as sub-par and not produced well but calling the rest of the album "high quality stuff to say the least." Morrow listed the cuts by Frost Like Ashes, Kekal, Stronghold, and Soul Embraced as his favourite on the release. Imperiumi.net also criticised the production quality of the Paradox tracks, but praised Sanctifica, Kekal, and Pantokrator, also noting the appearances of Frosthardr, Frost Like Ashes, Stronghold, Sorrow Storm, and Bleakwail.

== Track listing ==
=== Overcome or Burn Forever in Hell ===
1. "Overcome (Victory in Christ)"
2. "Burning Forever"

=== Arachnid Terror Sampler ===
1. Soul Embraced – "Unborn"
2. Sanctifica – "Red Alert"
3. Sorrowstorm – "Chanting the Last Passages"
4. Tortured Conscience – "Internal Torment"
5. Frosthardr – "Unhuman Morbid Fantasy"
6. Ganglia – "Suddenly Destroyed"
7. Oblivion – "Sovereign God"
8. Bleakwail – "Passionate Peace"
9. Encryptor – "Rebrutalization"
10. Frost Like Ashes – "Adorers of Blood"
11. Inversion – "Independence"
12. Kekal – "Mean Attraction"
13. Pantokrator – "Divine Light"
14. Stronghold – "Tears"
