= Rob Rock =

American heavy metal singer

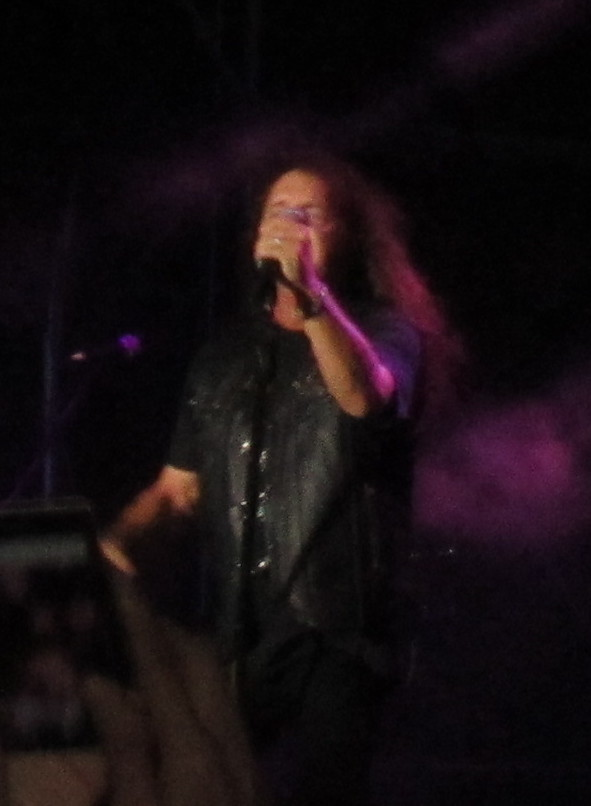
- Rock performing with Impellitteri in 2016

Background information
- Born: June 29, 1959 (age 67); Orlando, Florida, U.S.
- Genres: Heavy metal, power metal, Christian metal
- Occupation: Singer
- Years active: 1983–present
- Labels: Massacre, Victor, AFM
- Member of: Impellitteri, Driver
- Formerly of: M.A.R.S., Warrior, Angelica, Joshua

Robert Rock (born June 29, 1959) is an American heavy metal singer who is best known as the longtime frontman of Impellitteri, a position he has held from 1987 to 1988, 1992 to 2000, and now from 2008 to the present day. Rock has also released five albums as a solo artist, and performed with a number of other notable artists, including M.A.R.S., Joshua, Tobias Sammet, Axel Rudi Pell and Warrior.

== Biography ==
Rob Rock's early music career consisted of stints with several local cover bands as a drummer and vocalist including Tangram, The Robert Allen Band and Vice which also included future band mate, Chris Impellitteri. They released a demo and were together until 1985. In 1986, he joined musicians Tony MacAlpine (guitar), Tommy Aldridge (drums), and Rudy Sarzo (bass guitar) in a project called M.A.R.S. The group released a lone album entitled Project: Driver in 1986, which received much critical praise, but the next year each member went a different way.

Rock then reunited with friend Chris Impellitteri and recorded the self-titled debut EP of the latter's band Impellitteri. However, he was also committed to another band named Joshua, so he could not continue with the band at the time. Rock recorded the Intense Defense album with Joshua, which was characterized by the editor of HM Magazine as being "probably the best melodic metal album in the universe." He also worked on other projects (Dennis Cameron's Angelica, Driver) which gave him knowledge of international musicians that would serve him well later.

After leaving Joshua in 1988, Rock formed M.A.R.S. offshoot Driver with two other former Joshua members, bassist Emil Lech-Brando and keyboardist Greg Shultz, former Jag Panzer drummer Reynold 'Butch' Carlson, and guitarist Roy Z; Z, Carlson and Lech-Brando had previously played together in Gypsy Moreno. Driver would release a 5-song cassette-only EP in 1990 but broke up the following year when Rock got a call from Chris Impellitteri and decided to once again join his band. Rock would stay on as lead singer until 2000 during which time Impellitteri released five successful albums.

In 2000, Rock decided to pursue his own solo career and parted ways with Impellitteri amicably. That same year, he released his first solo album called Rage of Creation. The album received critical praise and Rock has gone on, releasing three more albums (Eyes of Eternity, Holy Hell, Garden of Chaos).

Rock's first solo disc 'Rage of Creation' was recorded at Joe Floyd's Silver Cloud studio. As a result of that collaboration, Floyd asked Rock if he would provide vocals for a revamped lineup of the legendary US metal band Warrior. They released 'The Code of Life' in 2001. It is arguably some of the heaviest music Rock has ever performed and received critical acclaim in Europe and Asia.

Eventually, Rock would reform Driver with Roy Z and Reynold Carlson and release the Sons of Thunder album in 2008, which consisted of re-recordings of their 1990 EP along with other unreleased songs written at the time. A second Driver album, Countdown, was released in 2012.

In May 2008 it was announced that Rock reunited once more with Impellitteri. Their new album, Wicked Maiden, was released in April 2009.

Rock has also lent his voice to the Randy Rhoads tribute released in 2000 and to countless other projects through his career like Avantasia and Axel Rudi Pell.

In 2013, Rob Rock made part of former Stratovarius guitarist Timo Tolkki's new project called Avalon, a metal opera featuring Rock as one of the main characters. He sings 6 songs on the album The Land of New Hope.

== Personal life ==
Rock has one son, Alexander John, with his wife Liza. Alexander was born January 5, 2006. Rock is a born again Christian, which has formed the subject matter of many of his lyrics.

== Band members ==
Current members

- Rob Rock – vocals (2000–present)
- Roy Z – guitar, bass, keyboards (2000–present; studio only 2003–present)
- Carl Johan Grimmark – guitar (2004–present)
- Daniel Hall – guitar (2004–present)
- Andreas Olsson – bass (2004–present)
- Anders Johansson – drums (2004–present)

Former members

- Reynold Carlsson – drums (2000–2003)
- Rick Renstrom – guitar (2001–2004)
- Bob Rossi – guitar (2003–2004)
- Hank Coffey – guitar (2001–2002)
- Tracy Shell – drums (2003–2004)

Former touring and session musicians

- Ray "Geezer" Burke – bass (2000–2003; session)
- Stephen Elder – bass (2000–2004; touring)
- Giuseppe "Maestro Mistheria" Iampieri – keyboards (2020; session)

== Solo discography ==
- Rage of Creation (2000)
- Eyes of Eternity (2003)
- Holy Hell (2005)
- Garden of Chaos (2007)
- The Voice of Melodic Metal – Live in Atlanta (2009)

== Discography ==
with Timo Tolkki

- The Land of New Hope (2013)

with Avantasia

- The Metal Opera (2001)
- The Metal Opera Part II (2002)

with Warrior

- The Code of Life (2001)

with Axel Rudi Pell

- Nasty Reputation (1991)
- The Ballads (1993)

with Driver

- Driver EP (1990)
- Sons of Thunder (2008)
- Countdown (2012)

with Angelica

- Angelica (1989)
- Greatest Hits (1993)

with Joshua

- Intense Defense (1988)

with Impellitteri

- Impelliteri EP (1987)
- Grin and Bear It (1992)
- Victim of the System EP (1993)
- Answer to the Master (1994)
- Screaming Symphony (1996)
- Eye of the Hurricane (1997)
- Crunch (2000)
- Wicked Maiden (2009)
- Venom (2015)
- The Nature of the Beast (2018)

with M.A.R.S.

- Project: Driver (1986)
