= Pantokrator (band) =

Swedish metal band

- Origin: Luvehult, Småland, Sweden
- Genres: Progressive death metal, Christian metal, death metal, melodic death metal
- Years active: 1996-present
- Labels: Rottweiler, Whirlwind, Soundmass, Rival, Tarantula
- Members: Jonas Wallinder; Rickard Gustafsson; Mattias Johansson; Karl Walfridsson; Johnathan Jansson
- Website: Official site

Pantokrator is a Swedish Christian metal band that was formed in 1996. The band's name means "Lord Almighty" in Ancient Greek. Several members have been in Crimson Moonlight and Sanctifica.

== Background ==
Pantokrator was formed in fall 1996 as a cover band. The band then decided to play songs written by themselves. It has had six members overall: Jonas Wallinder (bass guitar), Rickard Gustafsson (drums), Karl Walfridsson (vocals) and Matthias Johansson, and Johnathan Jansson (guitars). Pantokrator released two demos within their first three years of existence, followed by several EPs and compilations of material they had accumulated until they officially released their debut album, Blod, which was released via Rivel Records on March 14, 2003. At that point, the band members had been together without losing a member for six years, only adding guitarist Jonathan Jansson in 2003. After four years of silence, the band released a single titled "Leviathan", a compilation titled A Decade of Thoughts, and their sophomore album, Aurum. Aurum, which was released on June 20, 2007, came out via Whirlwind Records, a label that had housed such bands like Kekal, Sacrificium, and Lengsel.

Another silence embarked, until 2010, when a single was released. However, instead of following it up with more material, the band waited until 2014 to release new material. Incarnate came out on January 21, 2014, via Rottweiler Records, home to Soul Embraced, Immortal Souls, and Grave Robber. The band would consistently release material over the next six years, until they released their fourth album, Marching Out of Babylon, released through Nordic Mission. The album was written around the visions of John the Apostle and the "Visions of Nicholas Farel 1914", from the Ordo Aurum: The Golden Order of the Almighty. The album's lead single was titled "We the People", which possessed very politically charged lyrics and imagery in the video, which led to people accusing them of being fascists. Over the years, they had similarly been accused of being illuminati and fundamentalists for some of the themes they incorporated. The point of the track was not necessarily to be pro-America, but to point back to Christianity's core beliefs, which the band has focused on throughout their career. In 2021, Pantokrator was listed as one of five death metal bands to look out for, alongside In-Conquered, Mangled Carpenter, Incarnate Deity, and Symphony of Heaven, the latter being a band that Walfridsson had done guest vocals for.

== Style ==
Pantokrator's common genre has been death metal. In a review of Pantokrator and Sanctifica's split EP, the band's style was described as "Crunchy death metal". The full review stated, "A classic brutal release with two great bands. Sanctifica plays Symphonic Black Metal & Pantokrator plays Crunchy Death Metal. Really cool stuff that shouldn't be miss if you are into brutal metal." Another review described them as "brutal, doomy death metal". Art For The Ears webzine, reviewing the band's album Aurum, said, "It's always pleasant to hear a band making progression. Aurum is the second full-length studio-album from the Swedish death metal band Pantokrator. On Aurum they've abandoned the Swedish lyrics they wrote for Blod. Now all songs are in English and the growls are quite easy to understand. This can't be said of the printing in the booklet. They are almost impossible to read as the texts have almost the same color as the backgrounds. But the music makes up for the lack of care for the booklet (the cover is also one of the dullest I've ever seen). What is immediately clear after I popped this disc into the player, is that the band has progressed. The songs are more mature and the sound quality is very good. Most of the songs are uptempo. A few are slower, more depressive and doomy (like the excellent "Thy Feeble Flame"). Pantokrator is not a band with lots of guitar solos, but the solo in "Where Lilith Found Her Peace" is really tasty. What I miss on this album, is the violin playing that Blod had. Nonetheless, Pantokrator has moved forward and the result is a very nice piece of melodic death metal."

== Members ==
Current members

- Jonas Wallinder - bass guitar (1997-present)
- Rickard Gustafsson - drums (ex-Golden Resurrection) (1997-present)
- Mattias Johansson - guitar (1996-present)
- Karl Walfridsson - vocals (1996-present)
- Jonathan "Steele" Jansson - guitar, backing vocals (Crimson Moonlight, ex-Sanctifica) (2003–present)

Current live member

- Johan Ylendatrand - bass guitar (2013–present) (Crimson Moonlight)

Former live member

- Linus Pilebrand - bass guitar (2011)

== Discography ==
Demos

- Ancient Paths - Unclean Plants (1997)
- Even Unto the Ends of the Earth (1998)

EPs

- Allhärskare (2000)
- Songs of Solomon (2001)

Splits

- In the Bleak Midwinter/Songs of Solomon (2001; Split with Sanctifica)

Studio Albums

- Blod (2003)
- Aurum (2007)
- Incarnate (2014)
- Marching Out of Babylon (2021)

Compilations

- 1997-2000 (2001)
- A Decade of Thoughts 1996–2006 (2007)
- Sands of Time (2014)

Compilation appearances

- Arachnid Terror Sampler (2002; Tarantula)
- Christian Deathcore: Volume 3 (2014)
- Christian Deathcore: Volume 4 (2015)
- The Pack Vol. 1 (2016; Rottweiler)
- Kill the Ill (2017; Various)
- Metal from the Dragon (Vol. 2) (2017; The Bearded Dragon Productions)

Singles

- "Leviathan" (2007)
- "The Initiation" (2010)
- "Awesome God" (2016)
- "Crossroads" (2020)
- "We the People" (2021)
