= Fall Babylon Fall =

Studio album by Veni Domine
- Released: 1992
- Genre: Progressive metal, doom metal
- Length: 67:24
- Label: Massacre Records, R.E.X. Records

Veni Domine chronology
Fall Babylon Fall (1992)	Material Sanctuary (1995)

Fall Babylon Fall is the debut album by Swedish progressive doom metal band Veni Domine, released in 1992. In 2010, HM Magazine ranked it #38 on their list of the top 100 Christian metal albums of all-time.

== Recording history ==
At first, Veni Domine recorded parts of the album in Eastbourne, UK, at ICC studio. P. A. Danielsson of Tiamat played keyboards on the album. The last song on the album they had to record in Thunderload studio, Sweden, since it was one of the few studios at the time that had the gear to record the over 20-minute epic "The Chronicle of the Seven Seals". Veni Domine was signed to Kingsway Music which published the album in UK and licensed it to United States and Europe through smaller labels. British artist Rodney Matthews painted the album cover. In the year 1997 Massacre Records reissued Fall Babylon Fall with a bonus track called "Visions".

Musically, the album showcases symphonic and progressive doom metal, sometimes compared to Solitude Aeturnus with Geoff Tate type vocals. The lyrics deal with the content of Revelation.

== Track listing ==
1. "Face of the Prosecutor" – 8:14
2. "King of the Jews" – 8:12
3. "In the Day of the Sentinel" – 7:14
4. "Wisdom Calls" – 6:44
5. "Armageddon" – 7:34
6. "O Great City" – 8:05
7. "The Chronicle of the Seven Seals" – 21:21
8. "Visions" (Bonus Track only on Re-release) – 4:04
