= Eyes of Eternity =

Studio album by Rob Rock
- Released: June 23, 2003
- Genres: Heavy metal, power metal, Christian metal
- Length: 51:54
- Labels: Massacre Records (Europe); Rob Rock Music (USA); JVC/Victor (Asia)
- Producer: Roy Z

Rob Rock chronology
| Rage of Creation (2000) | Eyes of Eternity (2003) | Holy Hell (2005) |

Professional ratings
Review scores
| Source | Rating |
|---|---|
| Metal Reviews | 83/100 |
| Powermetal.de | 8/10 |
| Rock Hard | 8/10 |
| Scream Magazine | 4/6 |
| Vampster | Favourable |

Eyes of Eternity is a 2003 heavy metal album released by Rob Rock. The album is his second release as a solo artist.

== Track listing ==
All music is composed by Rob Rock and Roy Ramirez.

| No. | Title | Length |
|---|---|---|
| 1. | "Rock the Earth" | 5:00 |
| 2. | "Stranglehold" | 4:34 |
| 3. | "Eyes of Eternity" | 4:10 |
| 4. | "The Everlasting" | 4:35 |
| 5. | "Rage of Creation" | 5:22 |
| 6. | "Conqueror's Hymn" | 4:47 |
| 7. | "Fields of Fire" | 5:34 |
| 8. | "You Know" | 5:33 |
| 9. | "The Hour of Dawn" | 12:15 |
| Total length: | | 51:54 |

Limited Edition
| No. | Title | Length |
|---|---|---|
| 10. | "Beautiful Lady" | 4:11 |
| Total length: | | 56:05 |

Japanese Edition
| No. | Title | Length |
|---|---|---|
| 1. | "Bridge to Infinity" | 1:43 |
| 2. | "Rock the Earth" | 5:00 |
| 3. | "Stranglehold" | 4:34 |
| 4. | "Eyes of Eternity" | 4:10 |
| 5. | "The Everlasting" | 4:35 |
| 6. | "Rage of Creation" | 5:22 |
| 7. | "Conqueror's Hymn" | 4:47 |
| 8. | "Fields of Fire" | 5:34 |
| 9. | "You Know" | 5:33 |
| 10. | "The Hour of Dawn" | 12:15 |
| 11. | "Children of the Wasteland" | 5:18 |
| Total length: | | 58:56 |

Taiwanese Edition
| No. | Title | Length |
|---|---|---|
| 12. | "Beautiful Lady" | 4:11 |
| Total length: | | 63:07 |

== Credits ==
- Rob Rock – Lead and Backing Vocals
- Roy Z – Guitars, Bass Guitar
- Reynold “Butch” Carlson – Drums
- Ray "Geezer" Burke – Bass Guitar
- Mistheria - Keyboards
- Rick Renstrom – Guitar
- Bob Rossi – Guitar
- Stephen Elder – Bass Guitar, Backing Vocals
- Tracy Shell – Drums
