= Veni Domine =

Swedish Christian metal band

- Origin: Sollentuna, Sweden
- Genres: Christian metal, doom metal, progressive metal, symphonic metal
- Years active: 1987–2014
- Labels: R.E.X., MCM, Thunderload, Kingsway, Massacre
- Members: Fredrik Sjöholm; Torbjörn Weinesjö; Thomas Weinesjö; Klas Pettersson; Olov Andersson
- Past members: Magnus Thorman; Mattias Cederlund; Gabriel Ingemarson; Mats Lidbrandt; Anders Olofsson

Veni Domine was a Christian progressive doom metal band founded in Sollentuna, Sweden in 1987. The band split up on 20 September 2014.

== Musical style and ideology ==
Veni Domine combined down-tempo melodic heavy metal, symphonic metal and doom metal with occasional touches of gothic metal. The band does not clearly fit into a specific category; according to the band, in doom metal festivals they are labeled as "power metal" and in power metal events as "doom metal". Originally, vocalist Fredrik Sjöholm represented operatic, high-pitched vocals but has since shifted to more lower vocal range during the years. The band cited Queensryche, Black Sabbath, Candlemass and Kate Bush as influences.

During the early years, the band's lyrics dealt with apocalyptic themes from biblical point of view. Later, their lyrics were more about personal topics. Sjöholm said: "The main aim of the band is to speak the message of God's love to the people who really need to hear it - the ones who will not hear it elsewhere. In the band we put a lot of emphasis upon prayer. We pray about each decision we make as a band. Obedience to God's voice is very important, we would be prepared to play pop music if that was what God wanted!" Although the band has stated that its message is not political, in a 1992 interview Sjöholm openly opposed things such as secularization, same-sex marriage in Sweden, and separation of church and state.

== Legacy ==
Fall Babylon Fall and Material Sanctuary are the band's significant, acclaimed albums. During the time when these albums were released, Veni Domine was well known in the metal scene. However, as their later albums took longer time to be released and gained average reviews, the band was more or less forgotten in the metal mainstream. Currently Veni Domine is a cult band of a small audience.

== Members ==
Last-known lineup

- Fredrik Sjöholm – vocals (1987–2014), guitars (1987–1989)
- Torbjörn Weinesjö – guitars (1987–2014) (Audiovision)
- Thomas Weinesjö – drums (1987–2014) (Audiovision, ex-Saviour Machine)
- Klas Pettersson – bass (2010–2014)
- Olov Andersson – keyboards (2011–2014) (Audiovision)

Former members

- Gabriel Ingemarson – bass (1997–2006)
- Magnus Thorman – bass (1991–1997)
- Anders Olofsson – bass (1987–1989)
- Mattias Cederlund – keyboards (1997–2004)
- Mats Lidbrandt – keyboards (1994–1997, 2004–2006)

Session

- P.A. Danielsson – keyboards (1992) (ex-Tiamat)

Timeline

== Discography ==
- 1992: Fall Babylon Fall (Massacre, R.E.X. Records, review: PowerMetal.de (in German))
- 1994: Material Sanctuary (Thunderload, reviews: Cross Rhythms, PowerMetal.de (in German))
- 1998: Spiritual Wasteland (Thunderload, review: HM Magazine)
- 2004: IIII: The Album of Labour (Rivel)
- 2006: 23:59 (MCM Music, review: PowerMetal.de (in German))
- 2007: Tongues (MCM Music)
- 2014: Light (Massacre Records)
