= Project Driver =

Project: Driver
- Cover art by Guy Aitchison

Studio album by M.A.R.S.
- Released: 1986
- Studio: Prairie Sun Recording Studios (Cotati, California)
- Genres: Heavy metal, neoclassical metal
- Length: 35:17
- Label: Shrapnel
- Producer: Mike Varney

Project: Driver is a studio album by the heavy metal supergroup M.A.R.S., released in 1986 through Shrapnel Records (United States) and Roadrunner Records (Europe). Formed by bassist Rudy Sarzo and drummer Tommy Aldridge, the band was originally named Driver and underwent several configurations, at various times including vocalists Jeff Scott Soto and Jeff Fenholt, and guitarists Mark St. John, Kurt James and Craig Goldy. The band's name is made up of the initial of each musician's last name: guitarist Tony MacAlpine, Aldridge, singer Rob Rock, and Sarzo.

== Critical reception ==
Professional ratings
Review scores
Source	Rating
AllMusic	2/5 stars
Collector's Guide to Heavy Metal	4/10
Crash	4–5/6
Rock Hard	9.0/10

In a very positive contemporary review, Rock Hard called the album "exemplary" and associated the music to Yngwie Malmsteen's 1984 album Rising Force, "not only because of the breathtaking solos of Tony MacAlpine, but also because of some songwriting parallels", offering "a colorful bouquet of musical diversity" with "something for everyone."

Modern reviews are less positive. Andy Hinds at AllMusic wrote that "while it masquerades as a Whitesnake-styled group effort, Project: Driver seems like another MacAlpine album with vocals added." Rob Rock was criticized as embodying "all the big-hair clichés of '80s heavy metal", while songs such as "Slave to My Touch", "Stand Up and Fight" and "Fantasy" were labeled "cheesy" and "cringe-inducing." Praise was given to MacAlpine's guitar playing, which Hinds described as "dizzying" and interesting. Canadian journalist Martin Popoff defined the project as "one of those doomed and hasty assemblages of rock journeymen utterly without synergy" and called the music "unbranded ear-splitting speed metal".

== Track listing ==
All tracks are written by Tony MacAlpine, Tommy Aldridge, Rob Rock and Rudy Sarzo.

Side one
No.	Title	Length
1.	"Nations on Fire"	2:52
2.	"Writings on the Wall"	3:03
3.	"Stand Up and Fight"	3:52
4.	"Nostradamus"	6:14

Side two
No.	Title	Length
5.	"Unknown Survivor"	3:41
6.	"Fantasy"	3:30
7.	"Slave to My Touch"	3:35
8.	"I Can See It in Your Eyes"	4:34
9.	"You and I"	3:56
Total length:		35:17

== Personnel ==
M.A.R.S.

- Rob Rock – lead vocals, background vocals
- Tony MacAlpine – guitar, keyboards, background vocals
- Rudy Sarzo – bass, background vocals
- Tommy Aldridge – drums, background vocals

Additional musicians

- Mike Mani – keyboard programming
- Bret Douglas, Tommy Cosgrove, Mark Tate, Dino Alden, Mike Varney – background vocals

Production

- Mike Varney – producer
- Steve Fontano – engineer
- Dino Alden, Randy Vance – assistant engineers
- George Horn – mastering at Fantasy Studios, Berkeley, California
