= Rage of Creation =

Studio album by Rob Rock
- Released: July 26, 2000 (Japan); November 27, 2000 (worldwide)
- Genres: Heavy metal, power metal, Christian metal
- Length: 48:28
- Labels: JVC/Victor (Asia); Massacre Records (Europe); Rob Rock Music (USA)
- Producers: Roy Z Rob Rock

Rob Rock chronology
Rage of Creation (2000)	Eyes of Eternity (2003)

European Cover

Professional ratings
Review scores
Source	Rating
Rock Hard	8.5/10
Powermetal.de	Favourable
Vampster	Very favourable
Aftonbladet	3/5

Rage of Creation is a heavy metal album by Rob Rock. It is his first album as a solo artist and was released on July 26, 2000 in Japan with 12 tracks. It was not released outside Japan until four months later on November 27, 2000 however with a missing track (only 11 tracks). This album led to Rob Rock's departure from the band Impellitteri when guitarist Chris Impellitteri first heard the album. He felt that the album would compete with Impellitteri for fans and asked Rob to choose between the band and his solo career.

The album features production and guitar work by famed metal producer Roy Z. Also making a special guest appearance is former Ozzy Osbourne guitarist Jake E. Lee. "Eagle" is a cover of a song originally performed by the Swedish pop group ABBA. Several songs on the album were originally written when Rock and Z were with the band Driver.

== Track listing ==
1. "In the Beginning" (1:32)
2. "The Sun Will Rise Again" (3:34)
3. "One Way Out" (3:26)
4. "Judgment Day" (6:30)
5. "Streets of Madness" (4:31)
6. "Eagle" (6:23) ABBA cover
7. "All I Need" (3:34)
8. "Media Machine" (4:17)
9. "In the Night" (5:16)
10. "Never Too Late" (3:39)
11. "Forever" (5:47)

== Credits ==
- Rob Rock - lead and backing vocals
- Roy Z - guitar, bass and keyboards
- Reynold "Butch" Carlsson - drums
- Gregory Analla - backing vocals
- Ray Burke - bass on "All I Need", "In the Night", and "Never Too Late"
- Jake E. Lee - lead guitar on "All I Need" and "Media Machine"
