= Eternal Reign =

German power metal band

Eternal Reign was a German power metal band.

The group released their second album on Limb Music. With their third album having been recorded, they experienced "musical differences" with their label and left.

== Discography ==
- Crimes of Passion (2002)
- Forbidden Path (2005, Limb Music)
- The Dawn of Reckoning (2010, Pure Steel Records)
