= Elgibbor =

Polish unblack metal project

- Origin: Poland
- Genres: Unblack metal, atmospheric black metal, black metal, Christian metal, extreme metal, ambient black metal
- Instruments: Vocals, guitars, bass guitar, drums, keyboards
- Years active: 1999–present
- Labels: GSR, Sullen, Open Grave, Metal Pulse Radio, Shigionoth, Eternal, SkyBurnsBlack, Vision of God, Son of Man
- Members: Fire; Azahel; Sebat; Ruah; Pathos

Elgibbor or Fire is an unblack metal project by Jarek Pozarycki that started in 1999. The band went on a hiatus around 2017, but reconvened with a full-lineup in 2020, consisting mostly of former live members.

== Background ==
Elgibbor started in between 1996 and 1998, but did not truly do anything until 1999 as an unblack metal. The project has released 12 studio albums and several demos, EPs and singles. The name of the project means, "God Almighty". Jarek, before becoming a Christian, was a Satanist. Since becoming a Christian, his faith has been the foundation of his band. Although Elgibbor is a one-man band, founded by Fire, the band played out live at Audiofeed Festival 2017, with the lineup of Fire on guitar, former Frost Like Ashes bandmates Azahel on vocals and Sebat on guitar, Ruah on bass, and bandmate Taberah of Katharos on drums. In 2020, the band reconvened with many of the live members returning - Azahel on vocals, Fire on guitars, Sebat on guitars, Ruah on bass, and Pathøs. The band released Corruptus Vindicta, in the spring of 2021 through Vision of God records.

== Influences ==
Fire stated in an interview that his influences "always come from Jesus" and he does not listen to secular metal. Christian metal artists Fire is influenced by include Crimson Moonlight, Arvinger, Drottnar, and Antestor.

== Members ==
Current

Name	Instrument	Years
Jarek "Fire" Pozarycki	vocals, guitars, bass, drums, keyboards	1996–present
Nyk "Azahael" Ediger	vocals	2017, 2020–present
Mike "Sebat" Larson	guitars	2017, 2020–present
Aaron "Ruah" Kirby	bass	2017, 2020–present
Logan "Pathos" Thompson	drums	2020–present

Elgibbor is primarily a solo project, but have had two other members.

Former

- Thunder Morr – drums (2012–2014)
- Kalle "Armath Sargon" Kannisto – effects, keyboards, choirs (2012–2015)

Live Members

Name	Instrument	Years active
Michael "Taberah" Carriker	drums	2017

== Discography ==
Studio albums

- Apolutrosis (2004)
- Halal (2005)
- Satan Is Defeated (2007)
- Stronger Than Hell (2007)
- Fireland (2008)
- Repent or Perish (2008)
- War (2009)
- Soterion Apollumi Hamartia (2010)
- The Imminent Invasion (2011)
- The Dungeons of Hell (2012)
- The Path of Suffering (2014)
- Revenger of Blood (2016)
- Resist Him (2017)
- Corruptus Vindicta (2021)

EPs

- Halal – Where Death Is Your Victory (2006; split with Moriah)
- The Inextinguishable Blaze (2006)
- Slava Bogu (2011; split w/ Pilgrimage)

Demos

- Elgibbor (2000)
- Berit (2002)
- Satan Is Defeated (2003)
- Confessions (2004)
- Like a Lamb to the Slaughter (2005)

Singles

- "Armageddon" (2015)
- "The Lamp" (2015)
- "The Beast Out of the Earth" (2015)
- "The Separation" (2015)
- "Deliverer" (2015)
- "Righteousness" (2015)
- "My Light Upon Your Path" (2016)
- "Fire and Sword" (2016)
- "The Sound of Your Voice" (2016)
- "Vision of Darkness" (2016)
- "The Anchor" (2016)
- "Repent One Day Before You Die!" (2016)
- "From Hell to the Sky" (2016)
