= Frost Like Ashes =

Christian black metal band

- Origin: Kansas City, Missouri, U.S.
- Genre: Black metal
- Years active: 2001–2011, 2019–present
- Labels: Sullen, Open Grave, Nosral, Rottweiler
- Members: Azahel; Sebat; Fire; The Blastronaut
- Past members: Syntyche; Ruach; Adonijah; Grond; Qoheleth
- Website: frostlikeashes.com

Frost Like Ashes is an American Christian black metal band formed in Kansas City, Missouri in 2001. The band has released three EPs and a full-length album, Tophet. Their songs have appeared on three compilation albums. Previously signed to Psycho Acoustix Records and currently to Sullen Records, an imprint of Open Grave Records, their music combines black metal, death metal and thrash metal with keyboards and vocals that switch "between about 10 different extreme styles within a given song." Their lyrics provide a Christian viewpoint for the regular themes of black metal. The band is controversial for using corpse paint, often associated with the black metal aesthetic.

Their live act inverts stereotypical black metal tropes, for example, spitting in and tearing up a Satanic Bible, and smashing a pentagram-adorned goat skull with a sword.

== History ==
Two band members, vocalist Azahel and drummer Adonijah, were members of death metal and thrash metal band Possession, active from 1992 to 1998. Guitarist, Sebat (formerly of World Funeral and Coven) formed Frost Like Ashes and recruited Azahel (vocals) and Syntyche (bass) in 2001 to play a hybrid of black and death metal.

Adonijah (drums) completed the group, and they were a part of the Tarantula Promotions sampler Arachnid Terror Sampler, which featured Soul Embraced, Tortured Conscience, Frosthardr, and Kekal in 2002. They released their first EP on SoTD Records in 2003. In January 2003, keyboardist Qoheleth joined the band full-time. Up to that point, Adonijah composed and recorded the keyboard parts. In 2004, the band parted with Syntyche and hired bassist Ruach.

In 2005, Frost Like Ashes released Tophet after some delays.

On March 13, 2008, Blabbermouth.net reported that the band signed with Sullen records, an imprint of Open Grave Records, for the release of the EP Born to Pieces. The EP sold out, and a limited edition 7-inch vinyl was printed later. Fire, of Polish black metal band Elgibbor, played bass for Frost Like Ashes at Cornerstone Festival on July 3, 2008, to mark his full-time membership.

They were working on a concept album based on a book vocalist Azahel was writing. The album, tentatively titled Gods of the Great Whore, was put on-hold on January 2, 2009, until the book was written. They have written material for another album, tentatively titled Who Walks in the Darkness, based on a R. A. Salvatore novel, Homeland.

In 2010, the band announced that they were going on hiatus. They said they would make new music at some point.

In 2017, Sebat formed label Nosral Recordings and signed several bands. The label re-released all of Frost Like Ashes' music, and re-released the Live in Omaha DVD. On February 24, 2019, it was announced the project would record a new album with Sebat on guitars, singer Azahel, bassist Fire, Qoheleth on keyboards, and drummer Grond replacing Adonijah. The band signed with Rottweiler Records. On May 29, 2020, it was announced that Grond left the project and was replaced with the "Blastronaut". On March 26, 2021, the band released the single "The Weight of Ice and Fog", from their upcoming release, Fellowship of Suffering.

== Names ==
The band members use aliases in their albums and press to keep their identities secret, much like normal black metal, but the band's aliases have meanings behind them. Azahel is an alternative spelling of Asahel, a figure in the Bible, Fire is the translation of Bassist Jarek Pozarycki's name, Qoheleth means teacher or preacher, Adonijah was the name of one of David's sons, and Sebat is Guitarist Michael Larson's "name". Though the band uses aliases, many of their names have become public knowledge.

== Members ==
=== Current members ===
- Nyk "Azahel" Edinger – vocals (2001–present)
- Michael John "Sebat" Larson – guitar (2001–present)
- Jarek "Fire" Pozarycki – bass guitar (2008–present)
- "The Blastronaut" – drums (2020–present)

=== Former members ===
- Eric – drums (2001–2002)
- Shayne Scholl – guitar (2001)
- Syntyche – bass (2001–2004)
- Ruach – bass (2004–2008)
- Gabriel "Qoheleth" Howarth – keyboard (2004–2023)
- Shane "Adonijah" Goade – drums (2002–2010)
- Kaleb "Grond" Luebchow – drums (2019–2020), (died in 2022)

== Discography ==
Full-length albums

- Tophet (Psycho Acoustix Records) – 2005

EPs

- Pure as the Blood Covered Snow (SOTD Records) – 2003
- Born to Pieces (Sullen Records) – 2008
- Fellowship or Suffering (Rottweiler Records) – 2021

Singles

- "Born to Pieces" (2008)
- "The Weight of Ice and Fog" (2021)

Compilation appearances

- A Brutal Christmas (SOTD Records) – 2002
- A Treasury of Sorrows (Lifeless Records) – 2004
- Back in the Day: An Old School Album (The Bearded Dragon Productions) – 2018
