= Audiovision =

Swedish metal band

- Origin: Sweden
- Genres: Heavy metal, power metal, Christian metal
- Years active: 2002–present
- Label: Ulterium Records
- Members: Christian Liljegren; Torbjörn Weinesjö; Simeon Liljegren; Thomas Weinesjö; Olov Andersson
- Past members: Lars Chriss; Andreas Lindahl; Mikael Höglund; Thomas Broman

Audiovision was a Swedish metal band that produced two albums, the second in 2010.

== History ==
Christian Liljegren, known for his work on Narnia and Divinefire, started up Audiovision during 2003 as a solo project. The first album The Calling was released in late 2004 in Europe and Japan, produced by Lars Chriss (Lion's Share, Road to Ruin). The guest list on The Calling featured Bruce Kulick (KISS, Grand Funk Railroad), Jeff Scott Soto (W.E.T., Talisman, Yngwie Malmsteen, Journey), Mic Michaeli (Europe), Tony Franklin (Blur Murder, Whitesnake), Mats Levén (Treat, At Vance, Krux, Yngwie Malmsteen) and Sampo Axelsson (Crawley, Glenn Hughes, Lion's Share, Road to Ruin)

In 2009, Christian formed a touring and recording band and ended Audiovision as a studio project. During 2009, the first shows were played in Sweden, Norway and Germany, and, in the summer, Audiovision started to record their second album Focus with producer Erik Mårtensson (W.E.T., Eclipse) overseeing the work.

In January 2010, Audiovision joined Stryper on the European leg of their 25th anniversary tour, and played shows in both Germany and Sweden.

== Members ==
Current members

- Christian Liljegren – vocals
- Torbjörn Weinesjö – guitars
- Olov Andersson – keyboards
- Simeon Liljegren – bass
- Thomas Weinesjö – drums

== Discography ==
- The Calling (2005 Rivel Records)
- Focus (23 April 2010 Ulterium Records)
  - Track listing: "Invitation", "Keep the fire burning", "We are not alone", "The son will come", "You are the reason", "Fruit of love", "We will go", "I will belong to you", "The way", "The gate", "Focus"
  - Videos were released for the tracks "Invitation", "Keep the fire burning" and "Fruit of love"
