= Sons of Thunder (band) =

Cristian rock band

- Origin: Bethesda, Maryland, United States
- Genre: Christian rock
- Years active: 1967–1975
- Past members: Blaine Smith; Robin Woodhams; Don Williamson; Joan Hettenhouser; Donna Gadling

The Sons of Thunder were a Christian rock band named for two of Jesus' disciples, James and John, to whom Jesus gave the name "Boanerges, which is Sons of Thunder". The group was formed in 1967 by Blaine Smith along with Robin Woodhams, Don Williamson, Joan Hettenhouser, and Donna Gadling and are now considered to be one of the original groundbreaking contemporary Christian Music pioneers. Youth Pastor, Russ Cadle, suggested and encouraged the group to form with the support of Dr. Richard C. Halverson, pastor of Fourth Presbyterian Church in Bethesda, Maryland. Their first album, Till the Whole World Knows, was released in 1968 by Zondervan Recordings.

== Original Live Recordings Discovered ==
A number of live shows performed by the Sons Of Thunder, many at the Forum Tea House and Gallery on M Street in Washington, D.C.'s Georgetown were recorded by Stan Kriz, the band's sound engineer. These performances are now available on YouTube in a slightly edited but largely verbatim form, which displays a compilation of performances from June 19, 20 and 29 at the Forum, as well a two other songs recorded at different times. The video also features a number of rare still photos and other pictographic history.

== Discography ==
=== Albums ===
Year	Album
1968	Till The Whole World Knows
1972	Day Follows Night
1973	Live at Virginia Beach
1974	Rock Gospel
