= Narnia (band) =

Swedish heavy metal band

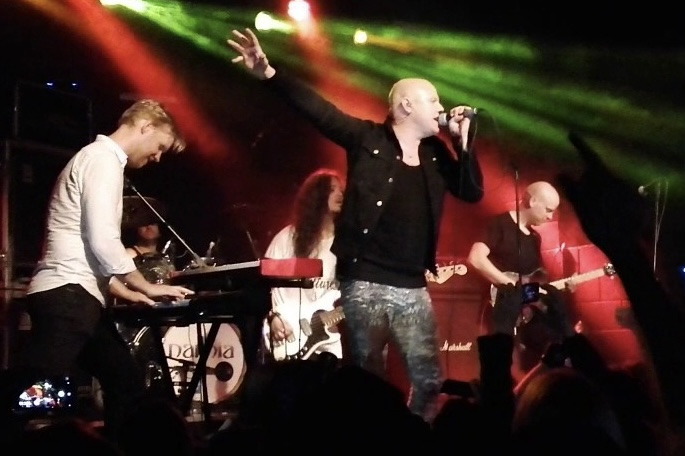
- Narnia in 2017

Background information
- Origin: Jönköping, Sweden
- Genres: Power metal; heavy metal; neoclassical metal; progressive metal; Christian metal
- Years active: 1996–2010, 2014–present
- Labels: Massacre; Attic Arcade; Nuclear Blast; Pony Canyon
- Members: Christian Liljegren; Carl Johan Grimmark; Andreas Olsson; Andreas Johansson; Martin Härenstam
- Past members: Germán Pascual; Jakob Persson; Linus Kåse; Fredrik Junhammar
- Website: narniatheband.com

Narnia is a Swedish Christian power metal band founded by guitarist Carl Johan Grimmark and singer Christian Liljegren. The band formed in Sweden in 1996, disbanded in 2010, and reformed in 2014. Their music references The Chronicles of Narnia by C.S. Lewis.

== History ==
Liljegren and Grimmark met for the first time in 1993 in Jönköping, a town in the south of Sweden. At this time Liljegren and his band Modest Attraction were just about to release their first album, The Truth in Your Face. Grimmark was a member of a band named Sentinel. They remained in contact over several years, during which both had trouble with their bands. Modest Attraction produced its second album Divine Luxury in 1996, at the same time as Grimmark decided to leave Sentinel. Liljegren phoned Grimmark and asked him whether he was interested in working together on a project. Liljegren had a passion for melodic hard rock, which he was not able to explore in the band Modest Attraction. Grimmark was instantly interested in a project along those lines.

A few months later Liljegren called Grimmark again and told him that Modest Attraction would go on tour to Germany and the guitar player Stephan Mohlin could not accompany them. Thus Grimmark replaced Stephan. Stephan soon left the band all together, and Grimmark was asked whether he would like to become a full-time band member. Grimmark accepted, thus giving Liljegren and Grimmark time to plan their project. They took a few old songs from other bands and altered them to their own preferences. In September 1996 they went into the Top Recording Studio. Grimmark played all of the instruments and Liljegren sang. The recordings took several months. They had several guests on the album, including Jakob Persson, who later played bass in Narnia. Janne Stark (Overdrive, Locomotive Breath, Baltimoore) was responsible for the guitar solos and Mart Hallek played the violin.

In January 1997, the recordings were finally finished. After hard work, the album Awakening was mixed.

Thanks to their manager Magnus Söderkvist their album was taken up by ten Japanese labels. Nine of these labels wanted to take Narnia under contract, finally Narnia decided for Pony Canyon. In May, Liljegren and Grimmark went on their last tour with Modest Attraction. They met Matthias Mittelstädt, who possessed an enterprise named MCM Music. Mittelstädt, along with his brother, Rainer Matthias, loved the album and Mittelstädt became their manager.

With a demo in hand and new management, they began to search for talented new members and finally Narnia was born.

Subsequently, the group signed with Nuclear Blast Records, and would release the albums Long Live the King (1999), Desert Land (2001), and The Great Fall (2003) on that label. They opened once for Stratovarius during this time.

A live-DVD and live album was released of their concert in Germany, both titled At Short Notice... Live in Germany (2006). The following album, Enter the Gate (2006), was released on MCM Music, as was the compilation album Decade of Confession (2007).

On 9 April 2008 Narnia began recording their latest album. On 29 April Liljegren announced his departure from the band. On 29 August the band announced on their official MySpace that the new vocalist is Germán Pascual. Germán grew up in Rio de Janeiro/Brazil, but moved to Sweden in his teens. Previously he has worked with various bands and artists, such as Minds Eye and Mendez. Course of a Generation was released in Europe by Massacre Records on 24 July 2009.

On 15 April 2010 the band announced that they would be breaking up. On 20 October 2010 they announced that they would hold two final concerts – one in Germany, and one in Mexico. Original keyboardist Martin Härenstam (Claésson) rejoined for the final two concerts.

=== Post-breakup and reunion ===
Since their farewell shows in Mexico City (at Revolution Metal), and Germany (at Christmas Rocknight), there has not been a great deal of information about the members of Narnia. That changed on 22 January 2012, as former frontman Carl Johan Grimmark took to the band's official MySpace and revealed that he had been quite busy in the past year.

According to Grimmark, he had joined the band Jerusalem during the summer of 2011, playing guitar and keyboard. He also stated that he was also involved with the band Full Force, composed of Mike Andersson, vocals (of Cloudscape), Anders Johansson (of HammerFall, formerly of Yngwie Malmsteen's Rising Force), Stefan Elmgren (formerly of HammerFall) and Tommy Larsson (formerly of Heed). He hinted at something big taking place in the future, but has since remained tight-lipped regarding the news.

On 31 January 2014 the band announced they were active again, celebrating the 15th anniversary of their Long Live the King album by playing live shows and re-releasing the album as a deluxe edition.

== Band members ==
Current

- Christian Liljegren – lead vocals (1996–2008, 2014–present)
- CJ Grimmark – guitars, bass guitar, keyboards, vocals (1996–2010, 2014–present)
- Martin Härenstam – keyboards (1997–2003, 2010, 2014–present)
- Jonatan Samuelsson – bass guitar, bass pedals, vocals (2016–present)
- Anders Köllerfors – drums (2023–present)

Former

- Fredrik Junhammar – drums (1997)
- Sonny Larsson – backing vocals (1997–2000)
- Jakob Persson – bass (1997–2001)
- Linus Kåse – keyboards (1999–2004)
- Germán Pascual – lead vocals (2008–2010)
- Andreas Olsson/Passmark – bass (2001–2010, 2014–2016)
- Andreas Johansson – drums (1997–2010, 2014–2023)

Timeline

== Discography ==
Studio albums

- Awakening (1998)
- Long Live the King (1999)
- Desert Land (2001)
- The Great Fall (2003)
- Enter the Gate (2006)
- Course of a Generation (2009)
- Narnia (2016)
- From Darkness to Light (2019)
- Ghost Town (2023)
- X (2026)

Live albums

- We Still Believe – Made in Brazil (2018)

Compilations

- Decade of Confession (2007)
- Soli Deo Gloria (2021)

Video albums

- At Short Notice... Live in Germany (2004)
