= Two (Earshot album) =

2004 studio album by Earshot

Studio album by Earshot
- Released: June 22, 2004
- Recorded: 2003–2004
- Studios: Groovemaster Studios (Chicago, Illinois), Henderson Studios (Los Angeles, California), Maple Studios (Santa Ana, California) and Swinghouse Studios (Los Angeles, California)
- Genre: Nu metal
- Length: 42:23
- Label: Warner Bros.
- Producer: Johnny K

Earshot chronology
Letting Go (2002)	Two (2004)	The Silver Lining (2008)

Singles from Two
- 1. "Wait" Released: April 20, 2004; 2. "Someone" Released: October 4, 2004

Professional ratings
Review scores
Source	Rating
AllMusic	(favorable)
antiMusic	link
Melodic.net	link

Two is the second album by American alternative metal band Earshot, released on June 22, 2004. The album would go on to spawn commercial success with the album's first single "Wait" being featured in multiple video games, the album's second single "Someone", as well as garnering significant radio airplay. Studio work on the album began in 2003 after extensive touring in 2002. Two reached #127 on the Billboard 200.

"Wait" became the album's lead single. Although it did not chart as well as the band's debut single "Get Away" from their Letting Go album, "Wait" is considered a breakthrough hit for the band and helped launch them into further mainstream success. It was featured on various soundtracks and made appearances in other media as well. Its music video was also rather successful.

Earshot appeared on Headbangers Ball in promotion of Two. In early 2005, they returned from the road in support of their second release and left their record label.

== Track listing ==
No.	Title	Writer(s)	Length
1.	"Wait"	Mike Callahan, Scott Kohler, Wil Martin, Johnny Sprague	3:33
2.	"Tongue-Tied"	Martin	3:43
3.	"Fall Apart"	Kohler, Martin	4:31
4.	"Someone"	Callahan, Martin	3:44
5.	"Rotten Inside"	Martin	3:24
6.	"Down"	Callahan, Kohler, Martin, Sprague	3:17
7.	"Nice to Feel the Sun"	Martin	3:55
8.	"Again"	Callahan, Kohler, Martin	3:56
9.	"Goodbye"	Callahan, Martin, Kohler, Sprague	4:26
10.	"Should've Been There"	Martin	3:58
11.	"Control"	Martin	3:56
Total length:			42:23

iTunes exclusive bonus track
No.	Title	Writer(s)	Length
12.	"Someone" (Alternate Version)	Callahan, Martin	4:01
Total length:			46:24

== Personnel ==
Earshot

- Wil Martin – vocals/guitar
- Scott Kohler – guitar
- Mike Callahan – guitar
- Johnny Sprague – bass
- Chas Stumbo – drums

Additional musicians

- Matt Walker
- Dave Moreno

Production

- Johnny K – producer
- Rich Costey – mixing
- Howie Weinberg – mastering

== Chart positions ==
=== Album ===
Chart	Position
US Billboard 200	127

== Singles ==
Year	Title	Chart peak positions	
Year	Title	^{U.S. Mainstream Rock}	^{U.S. Modern Rock}
2004	"Wait"	13	33
2004	"Someone"	27	-

== Appearances ==
- The song "Wait" was featured in the video games Madden NFL 2005 in 2004 and MX vs. ATV Unleashed in 2005.
- The song "Down" was featured in the video game Gretzky NHL 2005 in 2004 and the trailer in Madden NFL 2005 in 2004.
