= Dave Moreno =

American drummer

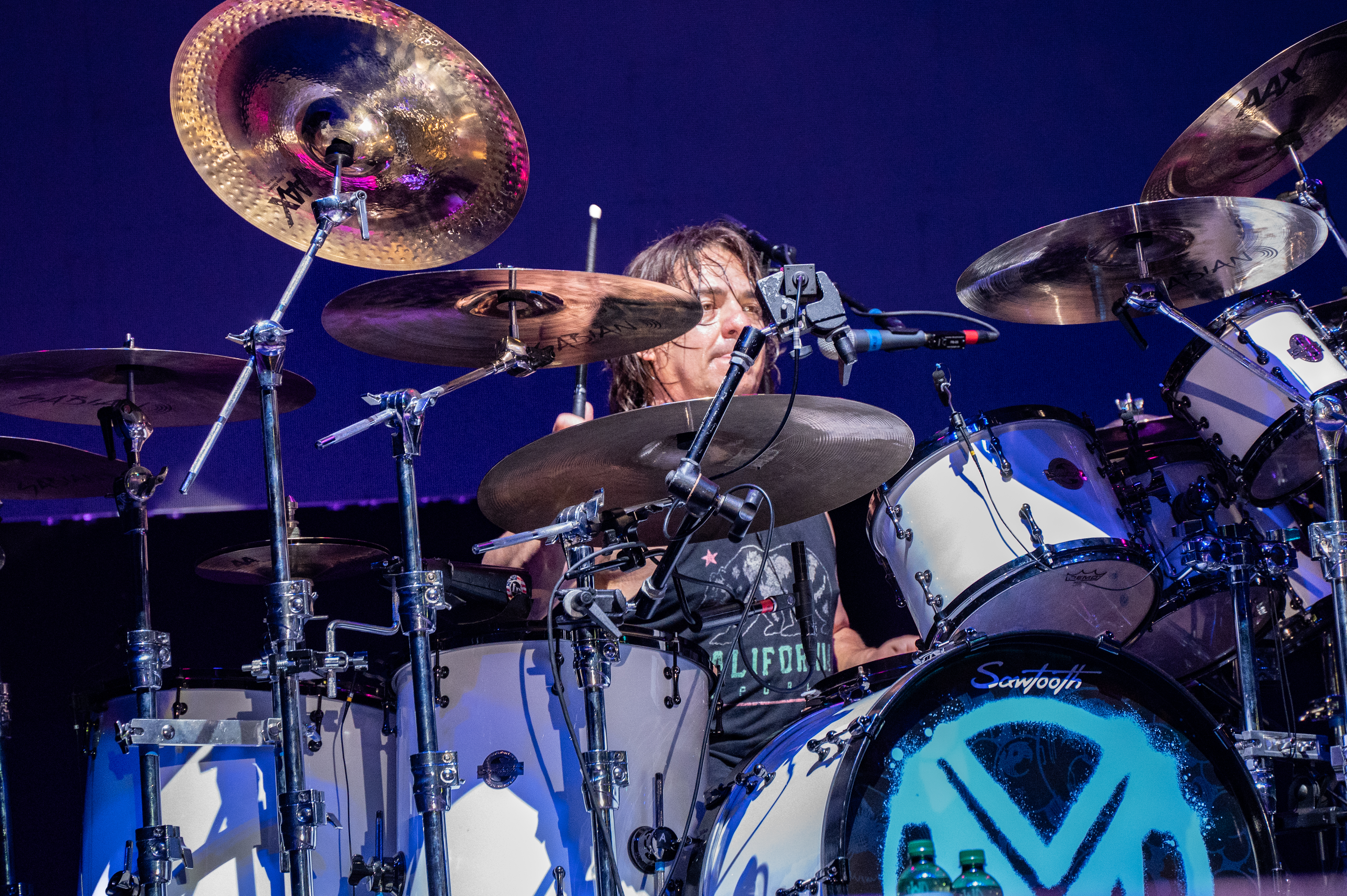
- Moreno with Bruce Dickinson in 2024

Background information
- Also known as: Chilli
- Born: Sun Valley, California, U.S.
- Occupation: Musician
- Instrument(s): Drums, percussion, vocals, guitars, keyboards
- Website: davemoreno.com

David Moreno is an American musician, singer, audio engineer, songwriter and producer, best known for his role as the drummer in the American rock band Puddle of Mudd, and for Bruce Dickinson.

== Early life and education ==
Born in Sun Valley, Los Angeles, California, Moreno is of Mexican descent. He first started playing drums when he was only 11, and at just 15 years old, Moreno was already performing his first gig at the famous iconic Whisky a Go Go nightclub on the Sunset Strip in Hollywood, California.

Moreno's musical education continued when he attended The Dick Grove School of Music upon completing high school. There, he graduated from the Percussion Program after studying hand percussion, ear training and music theory, as well as many genres of music which encompassed everything from Rock, Metal, Jazz, Disco, Latin, Hip Hop, Funk, and Fusion to Orchestra, Big Band, R&B and Country.

== Career ==
Moreno has recorded more than 100 records which include movie soundtracks, instructional CDs, karaoke and television commercials. In 2008, he contributed the studio drum piece for the theme song to the Dr. Phil show.

Moreno's professional in-studio affiliations include names such as: Bill Appleberry (The Wallflowers, Puddle of Mudd), David Kahne (Paul McCartney, Sugar Ray, Rolling Stones), Johnny K (Disturbed, 3 Doors Down), Roy Z (Judas Priest, Bruce Dickinson), Andy Johns (Led Zeppelin), Greg Hampton (Alice Cooper, Lita Ford) and Richard Podolor (Three Dog Night, Michelle Branch).

Moreno has also recorded and toured worldwide with an eclectic array of musical artists including: Bruce Dickinson – Iron Maiden, Dizzy Reed – Guns N' Roses, Steve Stevens – Billy Idol, Earshot – Warner Bros, Operator – Atlantic Records, Rob Rock, Judas Priest, Tribe of Gypsies – JVC/Victor, Love/Hate, Ice-T's Body Count, Phil Lewis – L.A. Guns, Vampiro X-Mana, Christian Castro, Belinda and María José.

In January 2016, Dave was chosen to be included in the elite line-up of performers at the 'Bonzo Bash' - an annual event at the NAMM Show honoring the late, great drummer, John Bonham of Led Zeppelin. There, he took the stage alongside other top-industry professionals, performing "The Immigrant Song" during the show.

=== Recent projects ===
Moreno joined Bruce Dickinson's touring band for his Mandrake Project tour in 2024.

Moreno also owns and operates a full production Recording Studio in Los Angeles called Doom Room Studio where he teaches, produces, records, and mixes independent and national artists, television and film. Previous clients of Moreno's have included Nick Simmons (Gene Simmons Family Jewels), Roy Z (Halford, Dickinson), Brent Woods (Vince Neil, Sebastian Bach), Vinny Appice (Black Sabbath), Kelly Rhoads, Chas West (The Jason Bonham Band, Foreigner), Copper Mountain, The Doo Wah Riders, Bobby Blotzer (Ratt), Jizzy Pearl (Quiet Riot), and Afterhours.

== Discography ==
Artist	Title	Released
Achilles Heel	D.F.C.	1997
Estancia	Latin Groove	1999
Claudia Claudia	Relaxing	1999
The Liberators	Access Denied	2000
Fairy Flute	The Other Side of Bossa	2000
Supercool	Live at the Wilcox Hotel	2001
The Spanish Bossa	Brazilian Mode	2002
Edify	Edify	2002
Scapegoat Wax	SWAX	2002
Jizzy Pearl	Just A Boy	2003
Viacrucis	Delirios	2003
Earshot	II	2003
Rob Rock	Holy Hell	2005
Bruce Dickinson	Tyranny of Souls	2005
Jizzy Pearl	Vegas Must Die	2005
Bruce Dickinson	ANTHOLOGY	2006
Mundo Vacio	Best of Rock en Español	2006
Can You Rock?	Blink-182 Play Along	2006
Can You Rock?	Fall Out Boy Play Along	2006
Tribe of Gypsies	Dweller on the Threshold	2006
KARAOKE	Ramones – Gabba Gabba Hey	2006
Can You Rock?	Mötley Crüe Play Along	2006
Can You Rock?	Metallica Play Along	2007
Operator	Soulcrusher	2007
Earshot	The Silver Lining	2008
Vains of Jenna	The Art of Telling Lies	2009
The New Czars	Dooms Day Revolution	2010
Dreams of Reason	Radically Poetic	2011
Humanity Street	Humanity	2011
Godfrey Paul	Country Rockin' Blues	2011
Body Count	The Gears of War	2012
Zombie Squash	Destroy	2013
Bruce Dickinson	The Mandrake Project	2024

== Equipment ==
Drums – DW

18 X 22 22
10, 12, 14, 16 – Toms / Floor Toms
6.5 x 14 Snare – Maple Wood and one spare

Cymbals – Sabian

1 – 17 " AAXplsion Crash
2 – 18 " AAXplosion Crashes
1 – 19 " AAXplosion Crash
1 – 21 " AA Rock Ride
1 – 14 " AA Brilliant Studio or Stage Hats

Hardware

1 – DW 5000 Snare Stand
1 – Low to ground – Drum Throne
1 – DW 5000 or 9000 Hi Hat Stand
1 – DW 5000 or 9000 DW DBL Bass Pedal
5 – DW Cymbal Boom Crash Hardware Stands

Accessories

1 – Shure 58 – Vocal Mic
1 – Drum Rug (if necessary)
1 – DI Box
