= Wait (Earshot song) =

Single by Earshot

from the album Two
- Released: April 20, 2004
- Genre: Nu metal
- Length: 3:33
- Label: Warner Bros.
- Songwriter(s): Will Martin, Scott Kohler, Mike Callahan
- Producer(s): Johnny K

Earshot singles chronology
"Not Afraid" (2002)	"Wait" (2004)	"Someone" (2004)

"Wait" is the lead single from Earshot's second album Two. It reached #13 on the Mainstream Rock charts and #33 on the Modern Rock charts.

Although it did not chart as well as the band's debut single "Get Away," "Wait" is considered a breakthrough hit for the band and helped launch them into further mainstream success. It was featured on the video game soundtracks to both Madden NFL 2005 and MX vs. ATV Unleashed. An alternate version was also included on the former soundtrack as The D.O.C. vs. Earshot - "The Madden Re-Match." "Wait" was also featured in the DVD Tampa Bay Lightning 2004 Stanley Cup Champions. Former UFC Lightweight Champion Sean Sherk has used it as his entrance music as well.

Lyrically, the song deals with the frustration of loneliness and indifference toward the world. Phrasing is somewhat general and a particular inspiration or meaning behind "Wait" is not evident. Despite these melancholy themes, the song is rather quick-paced and headstrong in its execution, hinting that the person going through all of it is willing to overcome his loneliness and indifference.

== Music video ==
The song's music video was directed by Noble Jones. It features the band playing in a grassy landscape at night, and was aired frequently on Headbangers Ball upon release. The video was also included at the end of the aforementioned Tampa Bay Lightning DVD.

== Charts ==
Chart (2004)	Peak position
Billboard Mainstream Rock Tracks	13
Billboard Modern Rock Tracks	33
