= Whips and Roses =

Studio album by Tommy Bolin
- Released: April 25, 2006
- Recorded: July 1975
- Genre: Rock
- Length: 78:16
- Label: Steamhammer/SPV
- Producer: Greg Hampton

Tommy Bolin chronology
| Live at the Jet Bar (2004) | Whips and Roses (2006) | Whips and Roses II (2006) |

Professional ratings
Review scores
| Source | Rating |
|---|---|
| Allmusic | 4/5 stars |

Whips and Roses is a collection of previously unreleased material from the 1975 rock album Teaser by Tommy Bolin. Released on April 25, 2006, it features newly discovered takes from songs found on Teaser as well as several instrumental jams heard for the first time on this album.

== Songs ==
=== Previously released ===
Several songs on Whips and Roses were originally released on the album Teaser. These versions are remixed from alternate takes remaining from the Teaser sessions. Many of these new renditions feature extended arrangements and radically alternate guitar solos from the original album.

Teaser tracks:

- Teaser
- Wild Dogs
- Savannah Woman
- Marching Powder
- Dreamer

Though not originally featured on Teaser, the song "Crazed Fandango" was recorded for the album but was not released until the 1996 compilation From the Archives, Vol. 1. A new version of this song, simply titled "Fandango", also appears on Whips and Roses.

=== Studio jams ===
In addition to alternate versions of previously released songs, Whips and Roses features two never before heard instrumental jams from the same sessions. Both tunes showcase Bolin's unique style of blending many genres of music into one cohesive performance. "Cookoo" features elements of the Teaser instrumental "Homeward Strut", and "Flyin' Fingers" contains a segment of "Cucumber Slumber" from the Weather Report album Mysterious Traveller.

=== Live tracks ===
The final two tracks of Whips and Roses are live tracks of historic significance to Bolin's career. "Just Don't Fall Down", is in fact a song from Bolin's 1972 band Energy called "Hoka Hey". The album's final track, "Blowin' Your Cookies", is a jam that took place on December 2, 1976, less than two days before Bolin would die of a drug overdose. The remaining musicians from this session were the band of a Miami hotel club called the Seven Seas Lounge.

== Track listing ==
1. Teaser – 4:48
2. Fandango – 6:13
3. Wild Dogs – 8:31
4. Cookoo – 4:55
5. Savannah Woman – 3:46
6. Marching Powder – 5:49
7. Flyin' Fingers – 15:56
8. Dreamer – 5:23
9. Just Don't Fall Down – 10:43
10. Blowin' Your Cookies – 12:09
