= Come Taste the Band =

Studio album by Deep Purple
- Released: 7 November 1975
- Recorded: 3 August – 1 September 1975
- Studio: Musicland (Munich)
- Genres: Hard rock; funk rock
- Length: 37:16
- Labels: Purple; Warner Bros. (US & Canada)
- Producers: Martin Birch; Deep Purple

Deep Purple chronology
| Stormbringer (1974) | Come Taste the Band (1975) | Perfect Strangers (1984) |

Singles from Come Taste the Band
- 1. "You Keep On Moving" Released: December 1975 (Japan) (Note: released in the UK on 12 March 1976); 2. "Gettin' Tighter" Released: February 1976 (US)

David Coverdale chronology
| Stormbringer (1974) | Come Taste the Band (1975) | White Snake (1977) |

Come Taste the Band is the tenth studio album by English rock band Deep Purple, released on 7 November 1975. It was co-produced and engineered by the band and longtime associate Martin Birch. Musically, the record shows stronger funk influences than their previous albums.

It was the last studio record Deep Purple made prior to their initial disbandment in 1976, and thus the only studio album by the band's Mark IV line-up, with Tommy Bolin on guitar, and the last of three albums to feature David Coverdale on lead vocals and Glenn Hughes on bass guitar/vocals. It is also the band's only studio album without vocalist Ian Gillan or guitarist Ritchie Blackmore, with every other album featuring at least one of the two.

Come Taste the Band was commercially less successful than the previous Deep Purple albums, and it was among the lowest in the American market compared to the band's 1970s albums. In the UK, the album peaked at number 19, and it reached #43 in the US. However, it received favorable reviews, and the band's stylistic renewal was praised. The album's reputation has been mixed. Members of Mark IV have questioned the extent to which that line-up can be called Deep Purple.

== Background ==
In the mid-1970s, Deep Purple was one of the best-known rock bands in the world. However the group personnel and atmosphere had changed over time. Musically, their approach shifted from heavy rock to blues, funk, and soul. Guitarist Ritchie Blackmore was heavily against the idea of incorporating the latter two musical elements, resulting in him departing the group and forming his own band, Rainbow, in 1975, with speculations that Deep Purple would break up indefinitely. Singer David Coverdale remarked that Blackmore invited him to join Rainbow, but that he thought it was uncomfortable and inappropriate. Blackmore did not take the refusal well.

Original members Jon Lord (organ) and Ian Paice (drums) intended to disband the group. But Coverdale and Glenn Hughes (bass) persuaded them to continue and hold auditions for a new guitarist, feeling that the band was not ready to give up after only a few years' success. The management was very supportive of the band's decision to continue. Coverdale suggested changing the name to "Purple" or "Good Company", but the others disagreed. According to Coverdale and Lord, the main reason for the band's decision to continue was the money.

=== Bolin's introduction and changes ===
The search for a guitarist turned out to be a difficult process. Coverdale's recommendations for the band were Jeff Beck, Rory Gallagher, and Tommy Bolin. Auditions were held at Robert Simon's Pirate Studio in Hollywood. Clem Clempson from Humble Pie auditioned for the band but did not become Blackmore's replacement. Bolin, whose playing on Billy Cobham's Spectrum album impressed band members, was then asked to audition. Coverdale recalled the audition by saying:

“He was a sight to behold – this exotic creature. He walked up to this line of amps - which had been pretty intimidating to whoever else had been there - and turned them all to eleven. Hit a chord, and the chord got everyone off their smug ass and started jamming – immediately. All his guitars were in hock – for whichever reason – so he had borrowed a guitar for the audition. It was quite an extraordinary, explosive audition.”

Bolin, who mainly played fusion jazz, had none of the band's records, and knew nothing about the band's discography and image. Despite this, the audition went well, and Bolin was immediately asked to join. Bolin admired the band's playing skill, but his decision to join was probably also influenced by the desire to gain visibility and money to promote his solo career (as his solo album Teaser was soon to be released). After weeks of rumors, the band announced Blackmore's departure and Bolin's joining in June 1975.

The new lineup was well-received. The rest of the band got along with Bolin, who was cheerful and outgoing compared to the argumentative and very difficult Blackmore. In particular, Bolin and Hughes became close friends. Blackmore also considered Bolin a good choice as his successor.

Deep Purple's managers were concerned about Bolin's availability. Bolin was already contracted to record and promote his own upcoming solo album. The band agreed to reduce their tight working pace, in order to give Bolin some time to focus on his solo career during breaks.

== Songwriting and production ==
Recordings took place at Musicland Studios in Munich, Germany from 3 August to 1 September 1975. Most of the album's material had already been composed before the recordings began. The songs were mainly written by Coverdale and Bolin. Bolin had a lot of usable material from his previous bands, many of which he had written with his friend Jeff Cook. The band members allowed Bolin to compose quite freely, satisfying him. The album was produced by Martin Birch in collaboration with the band, while Ian Paice joined Birch to mix the record.

Unlike Blackmore, Bolin used a lot of effect pedals and other effects in his playing, notably the Echoplex, and used the opportunities brought by the studio much more than Blackmore. On the album, for example, overlapping guitar tracks were frequently used. Keyboardist Jon Lord is a supporting player for much of the album, except for his solos on "Love Child" and the keyboard-driven "This Time Around" on which he plays all the instruments.

The recordings were made difficult by the members' substance abuse problems. Bolin was in Europe for the first time and headed to the nightclubs of Munich as soon as he arrived. Before leaving, he took the five sleeping pills given to the band due to the time difference. Bolin used heroin and other opioids irregularly but often. The other members at that time did not know the seriousness of the situation. Hughes, on the other hand, had been addicted to cocaine for some time. The road crew tried to prevent drug use by hiding the drugs supplied to members and beating up drug dealers, but the attempts were mostly unsuccessful. Drugs were smuggled to Bolin and Hughes, among other things, inside hollowed-out books. Hughes was sent to London for drug rehab after being beaten up by a roadie. The public was told that Hughes had a liver infection.

Due to his absence, Hughes sings significantly less on the album than on the previous two Deep Purple albums. He sings the lead on "Gettin' Tighter" and "This Time Around". However, Hughes' joint vocals with Coverdale, which colored previous albums, can only be heard on Come Taste the Band's last song "You Keep On Moving". Along with Coverdale, Bolin sings a bridge in the song "Dealer". The original version of the song was performed by Hughes, but after he had to withdraw to England, Coverdale recorded a new vocal track instead. Coverdale and Hughes also had a dispute over the division of singing parts. Hughes had time to record most of the bass tracks before he left, but the song "Comin' Home" features Bolin on bass and backing vocals. After the recordings, the other members made Hughes' continuation in the band conditional on his taking care of himself.

After the completion of Come Taste the Band, Bolin completed his solo album Teaser. Both Hughes and Lord contributed to the album, although they are not credited. During Deep Purple's hiatus, Lord composed and recorded his solo album Sarabande.

== Music and lyrics ==
Come Taste the Band differs from Deep Purple's previous output due to its strong funk and blues influence. According to Mika Järvinen, the album was a "radical and brave... attempt to completely reform". Despite this, the whole is more rock-style than the band's previous album Stormbringer, which was heavily influenced by black music. Stormbringer's style had divided the band's fans, and Coverdale had already promised before Bolin joined that the band would return to rock on their next album.

In the practice sessions of the first weeks of Mark IV, the band has played long and free-form improvisations. Come Taste the Band, on the other hand, has almost no such parts. According to AllMusic, the genres of the album are listed as arena rock, hard rock and heavy metal. According to Rolling Stone contemporary assessment, the album continues the funk style of the band's previous two albums but also has an aspiration back to the progressive rock of the band's early days.

=== Comin' Home ===
Come Taste the Band's opening track "Comin' Home" combines Deep Purple's old and new style. Paice's drum intro starts the song that was used similar to the concerts of the band's previous line-up. Guitarist Tommy Bolin's playing style using effects brings something new to the song. The composition represents energetic, straightforward rock.

=== Lady Luck ===
"Comin' Home" is followed by "Lady Luck" in a similar style. It was composed by Jeff Cook, and Bolin brought the song with him when he joined Deep Purple. Bolin had been performing it in his concerts for four years already, but the new band brought out "new aspects" of the composition. Coverdale finished the song and wrote the lyrics about the blue-eyed gypsy queen.

=== Gettin' Tighter ===
"Gettin' Tighter" is a guitar-driven and upbeat song sung by Hughes that featured more funk influences than any Deep Purple song ever before. The song originated from a riff invented by Bolin: "I duned it in one practice session. I just rolled... 'Damn, they would enjoy this' [...] I started to feel them and they started to feel me, it was like... giving and taking, that is, musically." The finished composition was credited to Bolin and Hughes. Bolin had written the guitar riff in 1974.

=== Dealer ===
"Dealer" lyrically has a dark tone. Its context shows the story of Coverdale's attempt to talk some sense into Hughes to curb him from addiction. The song also features a couple of bars of Bolin's vocals.

=== I Need Love ===
In the last song of the A-side, "I Need Love", Coverdale sings about sex, a topic that had already become his trademark. The song also features a female backup singer.

=== Drifter ===
The B-side starts with the fast-paced "Drifter", which had already been completed during the Pirate studio's rehearsals. The song's riff is reminiscent of Blackmore's song "Mistreated".

=== Love Child ===
"Love Child" is reminiscent of Led Zeppelin songs, and the guitar riff in the chorus is borrowed from Bolin's previous band, The James Gang. Jon Lord's keyboard work is also a significant part.

=== This Time Around/Owed to 'G' ===
"This Time Around" is a calm piano ballad, with Hughes singing over Lord's keyboard accompaniment. The song serves as the intro to Tommy Bolin's solo number "Owed to 'G'" instrumental. The composition originated from Bolin and Lord jamming into the double-jointed track. The letter G was a tribute to composer George Gershwin, whose compositions inspired Deep Purple's songs "Black Night" and "Burn". In some reissued pressings this is split into two separate tracks.

=== You Keep On Moving ===
The LP ends with "You Keep On Moving", in which Coverdale and Hughes perform their joint vocals for the only time on the album, which had played an important part in the previous two Deep Purple albums. Coverdale and Hughes composed the song back in 1974 before Bolin joined. The latter did not contribute to the composition, but his guitar playing is heavily featured in the song. "You Keep On Moving" was released in the UK as the album's only single, and many contemporary critics considered it the album's best. Dave Thompson has described it as "an eerily gallant ballad with a hint of Queen."

=== Same in L.A. ===
The unfinished song "Same in LA" was left over from the recordings, which was possibly intended as a single. There are a few bars of vocals at the beginning of the song, but the rest of the recording consists of just the accompaniment. The song is included as a bonus track on some reissues, particularly the 30th-anniversary set.

== Artwork ==
The name of the album has been attributed to a translation of the statement "come taste the wine" appearing in the musical Cabaret. While drinking wine, Bolin's invention turns this into "come taste the band". The cover art was developed by Castle, Chappell & Partners, who were also responsible for the cover of Deep Purple's Fireball album. For the cover, the band used a wine glass engraved with calligraphy, by Ken Cooper.

== Marketing and promotion ==
The album was released on 7 November 1975 by their own alliance-distributed label, Purple Records. The record spawned only two singles: "You Keep On Moving" in the UK, and "Gettin' Tighter" in the US.

Deep Purple's fans were mostly teenagers and young adults. In an interview with Radio Luxembourg, Ian Paice said that the members were aware that the band's traditional audience would not like songs like "You Keep On Moving". Instead, the band wanted to reach a new, younger audience, who at the time of the release of the band's first hits would have only been in childhood. Deep Purple's musical style had changed before. Traditionally, the band had marketed their albums through tours, the success of which had proven the viability of varying line-ups. Come Taste the Band's tour, on the other hand, failed miserably.

In its commercial outlook, sales numbers for Come Taste the Band were less successful than previous albums. It failed to top the charts in any country. In the UK, the album charted at #19 and held its placement for 4 weeks after its release. In the US, it only peaked at #43 by the second week of 1976 and remained in the charts for 14 weeks. The highest placement in the album charts were in New Zealand and Norway, peaking at #6. Despite this, the record earned a silver certification from the BPI in their native country before its official UK release, meaning over 60,000 sales. The album was in fact considered a commercial disappointment compared to the rest of Deep Purple's studio album discography of the 1970s, particularly in America, where it has failed to meet any level of certification.

=== Touring ===
"We traveled the world and destroyed Deep Purple's reputation everywhere we played." - Jon Lord (1995)"

Conflicts arose between the members of Deep Purple even before the tour began. Bolin, who used to enjoy artistic freedom, became frustrated when he was asked to play Blackmore-era songs in the style of his predecessor. This was made especially bitter by the fact that Bolin had to testify in court about Blackmore's wife's infidelity. After the tour began, it was revealed that Bolin did not know Blackmore's songs properly. Along with them, the band performed all the songs from the new album at some point during the tour. Bolin and Lord also played long improvised guitar and keyboard solos, which, unlike before, were performed as separate solo numbers from the actual songs. In addition, the band performed the songs "Wild Dogs", "Marching Powder" and "Homeward Strut" from Bolin's Teaser album. Bolin sang the lead on "Wild Dogs" himself, while the other two Teaser tracks were instrumentals.

Problems on the tour were caused by the drug problems of the members. During rehab, Hughes had reduced his cocaine use, but at the same time became dependent on diazepam, which is used to treat withdrawal symptoms. Bolin, on the other hand, used large amounts of heroin, which was revealed to the other members only after the tour had already started. In the Goldmine magazine, however, a person close to the band remarked: "The problem wasn't so much that Tommy liked drugs, but that the other band members weren't into it. He was in his own worlds for a long time, and the others didn't understand at all what was going on." Conflicts were also caused by the band members' sexual infidelity: Bolin's girlfriend Karen Ulibarri had an affair with Hughes, and Hughes' girlfriend with Lord.

The managers decided to start the tour from the Far East so that the new line-up could gain experience and not hear about possible failures in Europe and America. The first concert was in Hawaii, after which the band moved to New Zealand and Australia. The concerts were very successful and especially in New Zealand the band gathered record audiences. A documentary about the band was also filmed for local television.

In December 1975, Deep Purple was slated to play in Indonesia. The band had been told that it would perform for around 7,000 to 10,000 people, but the actual venue was a stadium that held 125,000. In addition, the band was required to perform on two nights, even though it only received compensation for one small concert. The group was paid a total of $11,000 (£4950; around £36,650 in 2023) for the Indonesian concerts, while the practical share of the box office revenue would have been around $750,000 (£338,000; around £2,500,000 in 2023), coming with more than 100,000 in attendance. Deep Purple tour manager Rob Cooksey told Chris Charlesworth writing in his 1983 book Deep Purple: The Illustrated Biography that "it was a set-up...as we were on our way from Australia to Japan and had our own plane, it seemed like a good way to pick up some extra money." 6,000 police officers equipped with machine guns and Dobermanns acted as orderlies. The first concert was chaotic and 20 minutes later, the band stopped playing. The latter eventually escalated into a huge riot. On the night between concerts, one of the band's bodyguards fell into an elevator shaft; he survived but died shortly after that. Hughes, Cooksey, and one of the crew members were later arrested on suspicion of murder. The next morning, a judge in military uniform declared the incident an accident and ordered the detainees to redeem their passports for $2,000 (£900). Lord and Hughes later speculated that it was a murder to extort money from the band. When the band tried to leave Indonesia, another $10,000 (£4500) was demanded, citing fake airport expenses.

While touring in Indonesia, Bolin spiked his hand with low-quality heroin, as a result of which the hand became numb and Bolin could not play properly. To the other members of the band, he claimed that he had a nervous breakdown about sleeping on his hand. The problems continued in Japan by the end of December, where the band played four concerts, ultimately would later release their live album, Last Concert in Japan recorded on 15 December 1975 at Nippon Budokan, on 16 March 1977. The live album would only become a success in Japan, but Hughes called it an "awful record," blaming Bolin's heroin addiction for his mediocre playing. At this point, Bolin had to use open tuning and Jon Lord played many guitar parts on his organ.

At the beginning of 1976, Deep Purple went on a US tour. Since Bolin was playing in his home country, he was more confident about the show in America and hoped that it would go along well as planned. The tour, which lasted just under two months, included a total of 30 shows, and when they ended, the band was badly overworked. The original plan was to take a break and resume performances only in the summer. However, the managers arranged a five-concert tour in Britain for the band as early as March. Coverdale, Lord, and Paice were given six days of leave to rest, while Bolin and Hughes partied throughout.

The UK tour was controversial and the concert reviews were strongly negative. Because of Bolin's and Hughes' drug use, the level of concerts varied greatly, and Bolin's performance was further undermined by the audience's loud demand for Blackmore's return. The band's mood was also affected by the poor success of Come Taste the Band. Coverdale was frustrated by Bolin's and Hughes' vocal parts, as well as the long instrumental parts, during which he had little to do as a singer. In addition, the members disagreed about the band's musical line: Coverdale, Lord, and Paice wanted to stick to rock, while Bolin and Hughes were more interested in funk.

=== Disbandment and aftermath ===
The tour's final concert was on 15 March 1976 in Liverpool Empire Theatre, where Hughes apologized to the audience for the band's poor performance, blaming it on jet lag in a fake American accent. After the concert, Lord and Paice decided to end the band's activities and take a break from touring. After a while, Coverdale arrived in tears and announced that he was leaving, to which Lord and Paice replied that there was no band to leave because Deep Purple no longer existed.

After tours for this album concluded, the public announcement of their breakup was not made until July 1976, with then-manager Rob Cooksey issuing a statement: "The band will not record or perform together as Deep Purple again". Before this, Bolin had already told in an interview that he was waiting for the band to start working on the next Deep Purple album. Along with the drug problem, the group's breakup was influenced by the harsh work schedule and the managers' reluctance to organize vacations for the members.

Roger Glover, who played in Deep Purple between 1969 and 1973 and again from 1984, pondered the matter: "Only when bands have failed is it possible to think about the causes of the problems. – Who knows where the band would have developed with Tommy Bolin? It could have become hugely popular. If that had happened, the attitude towards his composition could be different now."

After the disbandment, Bolin formed his own band that toured in support of Peter Frampton and Jeff Beck, including the recording of his second solo album Private Eyes. However, Bolin died of multiple drug intoxication on 4 December 1976 caused by heroin, alcohol, cocaine, and barbiturates. Bolin was 25 years old.

Coverdale then retreated to his permanent residence in Germany, where he embarked on a solo career, releasing two of his solo albums, White Snake and Northwinds. After that, he put his arrangements together with his band, later named Whitesnake. Lord and Paice joined Coverdale for the first five Whitesnake albums, Trouble (1978) through Slide It In (1984), all released with longtime Deep Purple collaborator Martin Birch producing.

Overall, Deep Purple's split would last for eight years until the reformation of the 'Mark II' lineup that would eventually produce the band's 1984 comeback album, Perfect Strangers.

=== Reissue ===
Released on 25 October 2010, the 2-CD Deluxe 35th Anniversary edition includes the original album in remastered form plus a rare US single edit of "You Keep On Moving" on the first disc, a full album remix produced by Kevin Shirley, and two unissued tracks on the second disc: "Same in LA" a three-minute out-take from the final release in 1975, and "Bolin/Paice Jam" a five-minute instrumental jam with Bolin and Ian Paice.

== Critical reception ==
Professional ratings
Review scores
| Source | Rating |
|---|---|
| AllMusic | 3.5/5 stars |
| BBC Music | (mixed) |
| Blogcritics | (average) |
| Classic Rock | 3.5/5 stars |
| Encyclopedia of Popular Music | 3/5 stars |
| The Great Rock Discography | 6/10 |
| Head Heritage | (favourable) |
| Rolling Stone | (favourable) |
| Select | 5/5 medals |
| Sputnikmusic | 3.5/5 stars |

In recent years Come Taste the Band was met with some critical reassessment "on its own merits", in part due to Bolin's contributions to the album, ranging from widespread critical acclaim from journalists and mainstream publications, including Rolling Stone and BBC Music. Ian Gillan (who left the band just over two years prior), on the other hand, has stated that he does not view the album as a real Deep Purple album. Ritchie Blackmore has been generally positive when asked for his thoughts on the album, and praised Bolin as a guitarist. Lord praised the quality of the album years later in interviews, stating that "listening to it now, it's a surprisingly good album," while acknowledging, "the worst thing you can say about it, and it's not that bad, is that, in most people's opinion, it's not a Deep Purple album."

According to Dave Thompson, "it didn't get rave reviews, it didn't have any weak songs and it wasn't a bad record, but it didn't...sound like Deep Purple". However, reviews from professional critics were mostly positive. Fanfare's review called Come Taste the Band their best since Machine Head and NME's their best since Deep Purple in Rock.

Kris Nicholson from Rolling Stone was favorable towards the record, praising Bolin as a more versatile guitarist than his predecessor, and the album's new stylistic directions as perfect territory conquests for Deep Purple. According to Nicholson, with the help of Bolin, Deep Purple had gotten rid of the predictability of their previous albums and now relied on melody and dynamics instead of volume. "The obvious desire for experimentation has expanded the band's music outside the heavy metal prison", and Nicholson hopes the band will rediscover the progressiveness of their early days, which they had lost after Deep Purple in Rock.

UK magazine, Sounds, later published as Classic Rock gave an enthusiastic response, according to Geoff Barton, that Bolin brought new energy to the band, as a result of which you can feel a boyish energy in the music not heard for a long time. Bolin's playing is fluid but restrained, and the overall impression is more free-form and good-natured than Deep Purple's previous albums. He added that it was clearly an "above-average rock album". However, Barton questioned whether it was good enough to guarantee the band's longevity.

Neil Perry of Select called it "a freak event in Deep Purple's recording career, an album light years ahead of anything else they ever did and David Coverdale's finest performance, period." Deeming the album to be "the first sign of what we now call funk rock", in particular praising Hughes's bass to be "pure funk", Perry hailed it for being as raunchy as Aerosmith's 1973 self-titled album and singled out Bolin's "fierce brilliance" as a guitarist, concluding: "Come Taste the Band is a lesson to all today's young pretenders on how to rock with real feel. There's not a duff track on it."

In the 35th Anniversary Edition review in 2010, BBC Music's Greg Moffitt gave a mixed reaction, replying that the album was "far from a disaster, particularly on its own terms," despite that the lineup was entirely "completed [...] into an entirely different beast." He also added that it was underpowered and way "too relaxed for its own good." However, to finish it off with a positive response, saying that it is a "harmless little sparkler where once there was a ton of TNT."

Circus described it as a concept album about "psychic dislocations" of rock life. In a more negative approach, Steve Peacock, writing for British magazine, Street Life, criticized the formulaic songs and their "banal" lyrics.

Record World said that the single "Gettin' Tighter" "shows the group at its best: rockin' up a storm."

== Track listings ==
All lead vocals by David Coverdale unless noted.

Side one
| No. | Title | Writer(s) | Lead vocals | Length |
|---|---|---|---|---|
| 1. | "Comin' Home" | Tommy Bolin, Coverdale, Ian Paice | | 3:55 |
| 2. | "Lady Luck" | Jeffrey Cook, Coverdale | | 2:48 |
| 3. | "Gettin' Tighter" | Bolin, Glenn Hughes | Hughes | 3:37 |
| 4. | "Dealer" | Bolin, Coverdale | Coverdale, Bolin | 3:50 |
| 5. | "I Need Love" | Bolin, Coverdale | | 4:23 |

Side two
| No. | Title | Writer(s) | Lead Vocals | Length |
|---|---|---|---|---|
| 6. | "Drifter" | Bolin, Coverdale | | 4:02 |
| 7. | "Love Child" | Bolin, Coverdale | | 3:08 |
| 8. | "This Time Around / Owed to 'G'" | Hughes, Jon Lord / Bolin | Hughes / Instrumental | 6:10 |
| 9. | "You Keep On Moving" | Coverdale, Hughes | Coverdale, Hughes | 5:19 |
| Total length: | | | | 37:16 |

=== 35th Anniversary Edition ===
Disc one: Original Album Remastered
| No. | Title | Length |
|---|---|---|
| 1. | "Comin' Home" | 3:54 |
| 2. | "Lady Luck" | 2:48 |
| 3. | "Gettin' Tighter" | 3:36 |
| 4. | "Dealer" | 3:53 |
| 5. | "I Need Love" | 4:24 |
| 6. | "Drifter" | 4:05 |
| 7. | "Love Child" | 3:07 |
| 8. | "This Time Around / Owed to 'G'" | 6:13 |
| 9. | "You Keep On Moving" | 5:22 |
| 10. | "You Keep On Moving (Single edit)" (bonus track) | 4:32 |

Disc two: 2010 Remix
| No. | Title | Writer(s) | Length |
|---|---|---|---|
| 1. | "Comin' Home" | | 4:08 |
| 2. | "Lady Luck" | | 2:46 |
| 3. | "Gettin' Tighter" | | 4:23 |
| 4. | "Dealer" | | 3:55 |
| 5. | "I Need Love" | | 5:16 |
| 6. | "You Keep On Moving" | | 5:18 |
| 7. | "Love Child" | | 3:05 |
| 8. | "This Time Around" | | 3:24 |
| 9. | "Owed to 'G'" | | 2:56 |
| 10. | "Drifter" | | 3:59 |
| 11. | "Same in LA" (previously unreleased) | Coverdale, Hughes, Paice, Lord | 3:19 |
| 12. | "Bolin/Paice Jam" (previously unreleased) | Bolin, Paice | 5:47 |
| Total length: | | | 90:30 |

== Personnel ==
Credits are adapted from the album's liner notes.

Deep Purple

- David Coverdale – vocals
- Tommy Bolin – guitars, vocals, bass guitar on "Comin' Home"
- Glenn Hughes – bass guitar, vocals
- Jon Lord – keyboards
- Ian Paice – drums

Production

- Produced by Martin "The Wasp" Birch and Deep Purple
- Engineered by Martin Birch
- Final mix by Martin Birch and Ian Paice
- Cover photography by Peter Williams
- Remastered by Dave Schultz and Bill Inglot at Digiprep, Los Angeles
- 2010 remix by Kevin Shirley at The Cave, Malibu, California
- Mastered by Bob Ludwig

== Charts ==
| Chart (1975–1976) | Peak position |
|---|---|
| Australian Albums (Kent Music Report) | 11 |
| Danish Albums (Hitlisten) | 18 |
| Dutch Albums (Album Top 100) | 12 |
| German Albums (Offizielle Top 100) | 29 |
| Italian Albums (Musica e Dischi) | 7 |
| Japanese Albums (Oricon) | 14 |
| New Zealand Albums (RMNZ) | 6 |
| Norwegian Albums (VG-lista) | 6 |
| Spanish Albums (AFYVE) | 17 |
| Swedish Albums (Sverigetopplistan) | 16 |
| UK Albums (Official Charts) | 19 |
| US Billboard 200 | 43 |

| Chart (2010) | Peak position |
|---|---|
| Scottish Albums (Official Charts) | 89 |
| UK Rock & Metal Albums (Official Charts) | 8 |

== Certifications ==
| Region | Certification | Certified units/sales |
|---|---|---|
| Australia (ARIA) | Gold | 20,000^{^} |
| Czech | Gold | 50,000 |
| United Kingdom (BPI) | Silver | 60,000^{^} |
^{^} Shipments figures based on certification alone.
