= Ace, Jack & King =

Studio album by Eli Cook
- Released: 2011
- Studio: Music Resource Center, Charlottesville, Va.
- Genre: Blues; blues rock; folk
- Length: 49:28
- Label: CD Baby
- Producer: Eli Cook

Eli Cook chronology
Static In The Blood (2009)	Ace, Jack & King (2011)	Primitive Son (2014)

Professional ratings
Review scores
Source	Rating
Sea Of Tranquility	5/5 stars
The Rocktologist	8/10

Ace, Jack & King is the fifth album by Virginia-based blues rock artist, Eli Cook. It was released in 2011.

The album contains a combination of Cook's acoustic blues and folk stylings with his electric hard rock touch. Vintage Guitar Magazine said of the album's sound, "A throaty vocal matches the crunchy guitars that lean as much toward metal as they do blues.“

== Personnel ==
- Eli Cook- Vocals, Guitars, Mandolin
- Brian "Boogie" Thomas- Bass
- Wade Warfield- Drums, Percussion
- Wavorly Milor- Harmonica

== Track listing ==
All songs written by Eli Cook, except where noted.

No.	Title	Writer(s)	Length
1.	"Death Rattle"		3:24
2.	"Better Man"		2:38
3.	"Please, Please"		3:30
4.	"Snake Charm"		4:05
5.	"Catfish Blues"	Traditional, arranged by Eli Cook	3:11
6.	"Draggin' My Dogs"		4:17
7.	"Afrossippi Breakdown"		3:05
8.	"Sugar and Rain"		2:54
9.	"Driftin'"	Charles Brown, Eddie Williams, Johnny Moore, arranged by Eli Cook	4:15
10.	"Cocaine Blues"	Traditional, arranged by Eli Cook	2:09
11.	"Crowjane"	Nehemiah Curtis James, arranged by Eli Cook	3:52
12.	"Suicide King"		4:24
13.	"Black-Eyed Dog"	Nick Drake, arranged by Eli Cook	3:25
14.	"Death Rattle (Slight Return)"		4:19
Total length:			49:28
