= Primitive Son =

Studio album by Eli Cook
- Released: 2014
- Studio: Hampton Hacienda Lab, The Cat Room
- Genre: Rock; blues rock; blues metal; grunge
- Length: 1:00:03
- Label: Cleopatra Records
- Producer: Eli Cook; Greg Hampton; Brian Perera

Eli Cook chronology
Ace, Jack & King (2011)	Primitive Son (2014)	High-Dollar Gospel (2017)

Professional ratings
Review scores
Source	Rating
Critical Jazz	5/5 stars
Dangerdog Music Reviews	4.5/5 stars
Blues Rock Review	7.5/10

Primitive Son is the sixth album by Virginia-based blues rock artist Eli Cook. It was released in April 2014. The album leans more to the grunge/hard rock side of Cook's work, and features a slew of guest musicians such as Leslie West and Vinny Appice.

== Critical reception ==
The critical response has been positive. Emma Johnston from Louder stated that the album contained "Timeless stuff created by a scholar of the genre". Steve Yourglivch from Blues Matters noted, "There is a high standard of songwriting and musicianship throughout. The guests never overshadow Eli and his core band but add subtleties and nuances."

== Personnel ==
- Eli Cook – Vocals, Guitar, Bass, Producer
- Rob Richmond – Bass
- Wade Warfield – Drums, Percussion
- Leslie West – Featured Artist, Guitars
- Vinny Appice – Featured Artist, Drums
- Artimus Pyle – Featured Artist, Drums
- Sonny Landreth – Featured Artist, Slide Guitar
- Reese Wynans – Featured Artist, Hammond B3
- Pat Travers – Featured Artist, Guitars, Vocals
- Tinsley Ellis – Featured Artist, Guitar
- Rod Piazza – Featured Artist, Harmonica
- Eric Gales – Featured Artist, Guitar
- Harvey Mandel – Featured Artist, Guitar
- Jörgen Carlsson – Featured Artist, Bass
- Erin Lunsford – Vocals
- Anthony Focx – Mastering
- Brian Craddock – Drum Engineering, Guitar Engineer, Vocal Engineer
- Greg Hampton – Engineer, Mixing, Producer
- Damani Harrison – Vocal Engineer
- Chris Kress – Mixing
- Jared Kvitka – Drum Engineering
- Jeremy McKenzie – Engineer, Mixing
- Music Resource Center – Vocal Engineer
- Brian Perera – Executive Producer
- Aliyah Davis – Graphic Design
- M. De Vena – Cover Illustration

== Track listing ==
All songs written by Eli Cook, except where noted.

No.	Title	Writer(s)	Length
1.	"War Horse"		4:48
2.	"Revelator"	Eli Cook/ Greg Hampton	3:17
3.	"Sweet Thang"		4:35
4.	"High In The Morning"		4:48
5.	"Won't Be Long"		3:38
6.	"Motor Queen"		3:48
7.	"Be Your Fool"		3:54
8.	"Swing A Little Harder"		4:35
9.	"Shake The Devil Down"		3:35
10.	"Tall and Twisted"		3:44
11.	"The Great Southern Love-Kill"		4:10
12.	"Amphetamine Saint"		5:00
13.	"Primitive Son"		4:53
14.	"Burying Ground"		5:08
Total length:			01:00:03
