= Zephyr (Zephyr album) =

Studio album by Zephyr
- Released: 1969
- Recorded: Wally Heider Studios, Los Angeles
- Genre: Hard rock, blues rock
- Length: 44:43
- Label: Probe (original release); One Way
- Producer: Bill Halverson

Zephyr chronology
Zephyr (1969)	Going Back to Colorado (1971)

Professional ratings
Review scores
Source	Rating
Allmusic	4/5 stars

Zephyr is the debut album by the band Zephyr, released in 1969.

== Track listing ==
=== Side one ===
1. "Sail On" (Tommy Bolin, Candy Givens) – 7:22
2. "Sun's a Risin'" (Bolin, David Givens) – 4:45
3. "Raindrops" (Dee Clark) – 2:40
4. "Boom-Ba-Boom" (D. Givens) – 1.20
5. "Somebody Listen" (D. Givens, C. Givens, Bolin, John Faris) – 6:10

=== Side two ===
1. "Cross the River" (C. Givens, D. Givens) – 4:43
2. "St. James Infirmary" (Joe Primrose) – 5:15
3. "Huna Buna" (C. Givens, Bolin) – 2:26
4. "Hard Chargin' Woman" (Bolin, Robbie Chamberlin, Faris, C. Givens, D. Givens) – 8:40

== Personnel ==
- Candy Givens – lead vocals, harmonica
- Tommy Bolin – guitar, backing vocals
- John Faris – organ, piano, flute
- David Givens – bass, backing vocals
- Robbie Chamberlin – drums, backing vocals

With:

- Bill Halverson – production, engineering
- Alden Spillman & William Shepard – cover design
