= Science Faxtion =

- Origin: California, U.S.
- Genres: Experimental metal, funk metal
- Years active: 2007-present
- Label: Mascot
- Members: Bootsy Collins; Greg Hampton; Buckethead; Bryan "Brain" Mantia; Tobe "Tobotius" Donohue

Science Faxtion is an American experimental metal band that formed in California in 2007. Comprising multi-instrumentalist and vocalist Bootsy Collins, vocalist and guitarist Greg Hampton, guitarist Buckethead, drummer Bryan "Brain" Mantia and DJ Tobe "Tobotius" Donohue (also known as DJ Botieus), the band has released the album Living on Another Frequency in October 2008.

== Band members ==
- Bootsy Collins – bass, vocals, keyboards, guitar
- Greg Hampton – vocals, guitar
- Buckethead – guitar, bass
- Bryan "Brain" Mantia – drums, programming
- Tobe "Tobotius" Donohue – turntables, Drums, programming & engineering

Bernie Worrell, another P-Funk alumnus, appears on this album as well, but not as a band member

== Discography ==
- Living on Another Frequency (2008)
