= Zephyr (band) =

American hard rock band

- Origin: Boulder, Colorado, U.S.
- Genres: Hard rock, blues rock
- Years active: 1968–1972, 1982
- Labels: ABC, Warner Bros., Red Sneakers, BGO, One Way
- Members: David Givens
- Past members: Candy Givens; Tommy Bolin; David Givens; Robbie Chamberlin; John Faris; Bobby Berge; Dan Smyth; Jock Bartley; Michael Wooten; Otis Taylor; Rocky Duarte; John Oliver; John Alphonse; Eddie Turner; Merry Stewart; Billy "Kex" Lachman

Zephyr was an American hard rock band formed in 1968 in Boulder, Colorado by guitarist Tommy Bolin, keyboardist John Faris, bass guitarist David Givens, drummer Robbie Chamberlin, and vocalist Candy Givens. The band's first release, Zephyr (sometimes referred to as the bathtub album), on ABC/Probe reached #48 on the Billboard 200 chart on March 14, 1970. Zephyr made an appearance on American Bandstand on 1/31/70 lip syncing to "Cross the River". Although the charismatic performances by Candy Givens were the focal point for the band, the flashy guitar work of Bolin is what the band is best remembered for.

When Bolin left after the band's second release Going Back to Colorado, he was replaced by Jock Bartley, and the band recorded the album Sunset Ride, their second for Warner Brothers Records. On Sunset Ride, Candy Givens displayed her gifts as a singer, composer, and harmonica player. The album was produced by David Givens, who wrote most of the songs. As a result of his stint with Zephyr, Bartley went on to a successful career with Gram Parsons and Firefall. Drummer Michael Wooten went on to play for several years with Carole King and was a founding member of the jam band Leftover Salmon. Wooten was replaced by Billy Lachman aka Billy Kex. Various versions of Zephyr continued to play in Colorado until Candy Givens died of a drug and alcohol overdose in Boulder on 27 January 1984 at the age of 37. The release of "Heartbeat" in 1982 was promoted with a music video that incorporated early examples of computer animation combined with live action.

Other Zephyr members include Otis Taylor, who played bass during the mid-1970s, Kenny Wilkins (drums), John Oliver drums, guitarist Zack Smith (founder of the band Scandal), and Eddie Turner, who played guitar in the last version of the band during the early 1980s. Candy and David Givens, Bolin, and Faris were founding members of the Legendary 4Nikators of which Billy Lachman was also a member. Taylor and Turner were later additions to band. Taylor was noted for playing motorcycle on stage during "Leader of the Pack" and performing in a kilt and Turner for his renditions of Jimi Hendrix songs. Billy Lachman played drums 1979 and 1980.

In 2014, David Givens and record producer Greg Hampton released a limited edition boxed set that included a remastered version of the "bathtub" album, two albums of live material (most of it previously unreleased), and a booklet with liner notes by Givens and photos from his private collection. The band was inducted into the Colorado Music Hall of Fame in 2019.

== Discography ==
- Zephyr (1969)
- Going Back to Colorado (1971)
- Sunset Ride (1972)
- Heartbeat (1982)

=== Live albums ===
- Zephyr Live At Art's Bar And Grill May 2, 1973 (1997)

=== Compilations ===
- Zephyr (2002)
- Zephyr / Going Back To Colorado / Sunset Ride (2015 BGO Records)
