= Letting Go (Earshot album) =

Studio album by Earshot
- Released: May 7, 2002
- Studios: Henson, Hollywood
- Genres: Alternative metal; nu metal
- Length: 44:18
- Label: Warner Bros.
- Producers: David Kahne; Jason Slater; Wil Martin

Earshot chronology
Letting Go (2002)	Two (2004)

Singles from Letting Go
- 1. "Get Away" Released: 2002; 2. "Not Afraid" Released: 2002

Professional ratings
Review scores
Source	Rating
AllMusic	2.5/5 stars
Melodic.net	3/5 stars

Letting Go is the debut studio album by the American alternative metal band Earshot, released on May 7, 2002. The songs "Get Away" and "Not Afraid" were released as singles during that year with each having their own music video. “Get Away” reached #4 on the U.S. Active Rock Charts and stayed in the top 100 for over 64 weeks. Letting Go reached #82 on the Billboard 200.

== Recording ==
Vocalist/guitarist Wil Martin mentioned "we just played around town and recorded demos at like friends houses and studios and we only did that one time with one song which actually spawned all the label interest. And it's obvious recording in someone's basement to a multi million-dollar studio because you need the space and some of the technology to be able to pick up the various things and instruments."

== Song meanings ==
"A lot of the songs are about relationships or about having a bad day, where nothing seems to go right, or where you just dwell on the negative. But the album as a whole is about getting past all that." - Wil Martin

== Track listing ==
No.	Title	Writer(s)	Length
1.	"Headstrong"	William Martin; Scott Kohler; Guy Couturier; Todd Wyatt	4:56
2.	"Misery"	Martin; Kohler; Couturier	2:51
3.	"Get Away"	Martin; Kohler; Couturier	4:10
4.	"Not Afraid"	Martin; Kohler; Couturier; Wyatt	4:33
5.	"Ordinary Girl"	Martin; Kohler	3:05
6.	"We Fall, We Stand"	Martin; Kohler; Dieter Hartmann; Couturier	3:18
7.	"Wake Up"	Martin; Kohler; Couturier; Wyatt; Jeff McDowell	5:07
8.	"This World"	Martin	3:18
9.	"Asleep, I Lie"	Martin; Hartmann	3:12
10.	"Unfortunate"	Martin; Kohler; Couturier; Wyatt	5:33
11.	"My Time"	Martin; Couturier; Wyatt	4:15
Total length:			44:18

== Personnel ==
Personnel per Tidal and liner notes.

Earshot
- Wil Martin – vocals, additional production
- Scott Kohler – bass (credited but does not play)
- Mike Callahan – rhythm guitar
- Dieter Hartmann – drums

Additional musicians

- Todd Wyatt – lead guitar (uncredited)
- Guy Couturier – bass (all tracks)

Production

- David Kahne – production (all tracks)
- Jason Slater – co-production (2–11)
- Andy Wallace – mixing
- Stephen Marcussen – mastering
- Greg Gordon – engineering
- Rob Brill – engineering

Management

- Matt Aberle – A&R
- Mitra Darab – A&R co-ordinator
- Lisa Socransky, Esq. – legal representation (for Davis, Shapiro and Lewitt)
- Darrel Eaton – booking agent (for CAA)
- Rick Roskin – booking agent (for CAA)
- John Jackson – European booking agent (for Helter Skelter)
- Michael Oppenheim – business management (for Gudvi, Chaprick and Oppenheim)
- InDeGoot Entertainment – management

Artwork

- Peggy Fee – cover model
- Greg Waterman – photography
- Lawrence Azzerad – art direction & design

== Chart positions ==
=== Album ===
Chart	Position
US Billboard 200	82

== Singles ==
Year	Title	Chart peak positions	
Year	Title	^{U.S. Mainstream Rock}	^{U.S. Modern Rock}
2002	"Get Away"	4	20
2002	"Not Afraid"	24	-

== Appearances ==
- The songs "Get Away", "We Fall, We Stand", and "Headstrong" were featured in the video game Legends of Wrestling II in 2002.
- The song "Get Away" was featured on the DVD Crusty Demons - Nine Lives.
- The song "Headstrong" was featured on the soundtrack for the film Queen of the Damned.
- The song "Ordinary Girl" was featured in the Xbox exclusive racing game Project Gotham Racing 2 in 2003.
