= Tommy Bolin and Friends: Great Gypsy Soul =

Compilation album by Tommy Bolin and Friends
- Released: March 26, 2012
- Genre: Hard rock, blues rock, Jazz fusion
- Label: 429
- Producer: Greg Hampton, Warren Haynes

Tommy Bolin and Friends: Great Gypsy Soul, often referred to as simply Great Gypsy Soul, is a double tribute album to former Deep Purple guitarist Tommy Bolin. Released on March 26, 2012, the album contains newly recorded music from original outtakes and alternative versions, with several modern musicians and singers performing singing on top of the original multi-tracks along with Bolin and his band. All tracks contain Bolin's original guitar work and vocals. Additional performers include Joe Bonamassa, Nels Cline, Peter Frampton, Warren Haynes, Glenn Hughes, Myles Kennedy, Sonny Landreth, Steve Lukather, Steve Morse, Oz Noy, Prairie Prince, John Scofield, Big Sugar, Derek Trucks and Brad Whitford.

== Track listing ==
All tracks written by Tommy Bolin, except where noted.

=== Disc One ===
1. The Grind (Tommy Bolin, John Tesar, Jeff Cook, Stanley Sheldon) / Guest Artist: Peter Frampton
2. Teaser (Bolin, Cook) / Guest Artist: Warren Haynes
3. Dreamer (Cook) / Guest Artists: Nels Cline, Myles Kennedy
4. Savannah Woman (Bolin, Cook) / Guest Artist: John Scofield
5. Smooth Fandango / Guest Artist: Derek Trucks
6. People, People / Guest Artists: Big Sugar, Gordie Johnson
7. Wild Dogs (Bolin, Tesar) / Guest Artist: Brad Whitford
8. Homeward Strut / Guest Artist: Steve Lukather
9. Sugar Shack (Bolin, Glenn Hughes) / Guest Artists: Glenn Hughes, Sonny Landreth
10. Crazed Fandango / Guest Artist: Steve Morse
11. Lotus (Bolin, Tesar) / Guest Artists: Glenn Hughes, Joe Bonamassa, Nels Cline

=== Disc Two ===
1. Flying Fingers / Guest Artists: Nels Cline, Oz Noy
2. Marching Bag Movement 1 / Guest Artists: Greg Hampton, John Scofield, Nels Cline, Sonny Landreth
3. Marching Bag Movement 2 / Guest Artists: Derek Trucks, Peter Frampton, Nels Cline, Steve Lukather
4. Marching Bag Movement 3 / Guest Artists: Gordie Johnson, Joe Bonamassa, Nels Cline, Steve Lukather, Oz Noy, Steve Morse
5. Marching Bag Movement 4 / Guest Artists: Brad Whitford, Joe Bonamassa, Nels Cline, Oz Noy, Peter Frampton, Warren Haynes
