= Living on Another Frequency =

Studio album by Science Faxtion
- Released: November 11, 2008
- Genre: Experimental metal, funk metal, progressive metal
- Length: 53:35
- Label: Mascot
- Producer: Bootsy Collins, Greg Hampton

Professional ratings
Review scores
Source	Rating
Allmusic	3.5/5 stars

Living on Another Frequency is the debut album by American experimental metal band Science Faxtion, released on November 11, 2008, in the United States and January 26, 2009, in Europe.

== Background ==
The news on the album was given by bassist and vocalist Bootsy Collins, who gave an interview for Billboard in June 2007, saying:

"We're looking at it like, 'What would happen if we wound up a situation down the line as we evolve, that our technology takes over and we are the ones that they're looking at as 'the scum of the earth. It's kind of like Planet of the Apes, what would they be like?, What would that feel like?. We're just trying to warn the world that that's comin', and we're having fun with that."

In Rolling Stone Collins stated:

"We wanted to challenge artists and people in the music business. We want to go somewhere where people haven’t been yet."

In an UGO.com interview with the band's singer about the origins of the band, Greg Hampton said:

"How did Science Faxtion first come together, and how did you meet Bootsy and Buckethead? Greg Hampton: I’ve known a lot of people that have been associated with the Funkadelic camp over the years, and I’ve always been a big fan of Bootsy’s solo work. I approached him to do a solo record that I wanted to do - collaborate with him on - and subsequently, we started with a funk concept originally, and it morphed into ‘a futuristic vision’ that Bootsy had. There’s a lot of books that are on this thing - what the world will be like in 2099, for example, where it’s half cyborg/computer/machine/musician. He had a vision of a modern rock band, and one thing led to another. As far as me being recruited as the singer, he had heard some things that I was writing for soundtrack submissions that were real heavy. So subsequently, he said, “Let’s make it a band.” He brought in Buckethead, Brain, and some other cats, and I brought in some people on my side. It turned into a great body of work - we had written probably 50 songs, recorded 23, and finished probably 17. "

== Reception ==
The release was met with mixed to positive reviews.

== Track listing ==
No.	Title	Length
1.	"Sci-Fax Theme"	3:39
2.	"Lookin' for Eden"	3:45
3.	"At Any Cost"	4:44
4.	"Chaos in Motion"	3:38
5.	"Famous"	5:27
6.	"L.O.A.F. (Living On Another Frequency)"	3:59
7.	"Gone Tomorrow"	4:32
8.	"Life-IS IN-Deliver"	4:52
9.	"Take You Down"	3:21
10.	"What It Is"	3:37
11.	"Fatally Flawed Flesh"	3:41
12.	"I See Rockets"	3:15
13.	"ZIONPLANET10"	3:05

=== Notes ===
- The song "At Any Cost" features parts of the song "Gigan" from the album The Elephant Man's Alarm Clock by Buckethead.
- The song "I See Rockets" features parts of the song "Lotus Island" from the album Inbred Mountain by Buckethead.

== Personnel ==
Science Faxtion

- Bootsy Collins – bass, guitar, drums, keyboards, synthesizer, vocals, programming, production, engineering
- Greg Hampton – vocals, guitars, production
- Buckethead – guitars
- Brain – drums, programming
- Tobe "Tobotius" Donohue – turntables, programming

Guest musicians

- Chuck D – vocals on "What It Is"
- Keith Cheatham – guitar
- Chris Collier – drums
- Steve Ferlazzo – synthesizer, piano, keyboards, vocals
- Kyle Jason – vocals
- Morris Mingo – keyboards
- Paul Patterson – strings
- Susan Peterson – strings
- Bernie Worrell – synthesizer, keyboards
- Brian Hardgroove – bass, drums, vocals, programming, engineering
- Dan Monti – bass, programming, engineering

Additional personnel

- Jeremy Mackenzie – engineering, digital editing
- Don Woods – engineering
