= High-Dollar Gospel =

Studio album by Eli Cook
- Released: August 18, 2017
- Studio: Full Moon Recording, The Cat Room
- Genre: Blues; blues rock; folk
- Length: 46:23
- Label: C.R.8 Records
- Producer: Eli Cook

Eli Cook chronology
Primitive Son (2014)	High-Dollar Gospel (2017)	All Night Thing (2020)

Professional ratings
Review scores
Source	Rating
Staccatofy	9/10
Elmore Magazine	90/100
5 Finger Review	90/100
Roots Music Report	4/5 stars

High-Dollar Gospel is the seventh album by Virginia-based blues rock artist, Eli Cook. It was released on August 18, 2017.

The album consists of mostly acoustic, original songs and revamped covers of Muddy Waters and Bob Dylan. At the time of release, Cook stated this album contained the most "authenticity" in his songwriting to date.

The ironic nature of the title was inspired by a spiritual "loss of direction" that Cook noticed in American youth.

== Critical reception ==
Critical response has been highly positive. Scott Bampton of Rock & Blues Muse noted that Eli had marked a "new blues territory" with the album's release. Shane Handler of Glide Magazine stated that High-Dollar Gospel proves that "Eli can play with the best." Blues Festival Guide complimented the energy of the album, stating that the record "preaches a high voltage bolt to your ears and shakes you loose."

== Personnel ==
- Eli Cook – Vocals, Guitar, Mandolin
- Peter Spaar – Upright Bass
- Nathan Brown – Drums

== Track listing ==
All songs written by Eli Cook, except where noted.

No.	Title	Writer(s)	Length
1.	"Troublemaker"		3:44
2.	"The Devil Finds Work"		4:01
3.	"Mixing My Medicine"		4:15
4.	"Pray For Rain"		5:00
5.	"Can't Lose What You Never Had"	McKinley Morganfield, arranged by Eli Cook	5:11
6.	"King Of The Mountain"		3:48
7.	"Mother's Prayer"		3:15
8.	"44 Blues"	Roosevelt Sykes / Traditional, arranged by Eli Cook	4:46
9.	"I'll Be Your Baby Tonight"	Bob Dylan, arranged by Eli Cook	5:18
10.	"Month Of Sundays"		3:35
11.	"If Not For You"		3:30
Total length:			46:23
