= Tommy Bolin =

American guitarist (1951–1976)

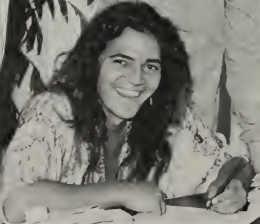
- Bolin circa 1975

Background information
- Born: Thomas Richard Bolin; August 1, 1951; Sioux City, Iowa, U.S.
- Died: December 4, 1976 (aged 25) Miami, Florida, U.S.
- Genres: Hard rock; jazz fusion; blues rock; funk rock
- Occupations: Musician; songwriter
- Instruments: Guitar; vocals
- Years active: 1966–1976
- Formerly of: Zephyr; James Gang; Deep Purple
- Website: tommybolinofficial.com

Thomas Richard Bolin (August 1, 1951 – December 4, 1976) was an American rock and jazz-rock fusion guitarist and songwriter who played with Zephyr (from 1969 to 1971), the James Gang (from 1973 to 1974) and Deep Purple (from 1975 to 1976), in addition to maintaining a career as a solo artist and session musician, notably for Billy Cobham on his 1973 album Spectrum.

== Career ==
=== Early endeavors ===
Born in Sioux City, Iowa, on August 1, 1951, Tommy Bolin began playing with a band called the Miserlous before he was asked to join another band called Denny and the Triumphs in 1964 at age 13. The lineup for Denny and the Triumphs was Dave Stokes on lead vocals, Brad Miller on guitar and vocals, Bolin on lead guitar, Steve Bridenbaugh on organ and vocals, Denny Foote on bass, and Brad Larvick on drums. They played a blend of rock and roll, R&B and the pop hits of the moment, and when bassist Denny Foote left the band to be replaced by the drummer's brother George Larvick Jr, they changed their name to A Patch of Blue. An album was released in 1969, Patch of Blue Live! from two 1967 concerts in Correctionville, Iowa west of Fort Dodge and in Sioux City. A Patch of Blue was inducted in the Iowa Rock & Roll Hall of Fame in 1999.

Bolin moved to Boulder, Colorado in his late teens and then played in a band called American Standard (with future songwriting collaborator Jeff Cook) before joining Ethereal Zephyr, a band named after the California Zephyr train which ran between Oakland and Chicago. When record companies became interested, the name was shortened to Zephyr.

That band included Bolin on lead guitar, David Givens on bass, and Givens' wife Candy Givens on vocals. The band had begun to do larger venues, opening for more established acts such as Led Zeppelin. Their second album, Going Back to Colorado, featured a new drummer, Bobby Berge, who would pop up from time to time in musician credits in album liner notes from Bolin's later projects. In 1972, the 20-year old Bolin formed the fusion jazz-rock-blues band Energy. Unable to secure a record contract, the band never released an album during Bolin's lifetime. However, several recordings have been released posthumously. Bolin briefly reunited with David and Candy Givens in a band called the 4-Nikators, after which he took nearly a year off from music. During that time, he wrote close to a hundred songs.

=== James Gang and Billy Cobham ===
Stuck between the musical direction he wanted to pursue and a nearly-empty bank account, Bolin joined the James Gang in 1973, replacing Domenic Troiano, who had replaced Joe Walsh in the band. He recorded two albums: Bang in 1973 and Miami in 1974; Except for one song on Bang, Bolin wrote or co-wrote every song on these two albums.

In between the James Gang albums, Bolin played on Mahavishnu Orchestra member Billy Cobham's solo album Spectrum, which included Bolin on guitar, Cobham on drums, Leland Sklar on bass and Jan Hammer (also of Mahavishnu Orchestra) on keyboards and synthesizers. Keyboardist Jon Lord said the album changed his mind about disbanding Deep Purple following the departure of Ritchie Blackmore. "When Ritchie left, I wanted to discontinue the band. But then David (Coverdale) said, 'I want you to hear something,' and he played the Spectrum album. I was blown away and utterly entranced by this guitar player."

After the Miami tour, Bolin wanted out of the James Gang. He went on to do session work for numerous rock bands and also with a number of jazz artists including Alphonse Mouzon's album Mind Transplant, considered "easily one of the best fusion recordings of all time" by AllMusic reviewer Robert Taylor. He also toured with Carmine Appice and the Good Rats. At the start of 1975, Bolin was a guest studio guitarist for Canadian band Moxy during the recording of their debut album, on which Bolin contributed guitar solos for six songs.

=== First solo album and Deep Purple ===
Later in 1975, Bolin signed with Nemperor records to record a solo album. Bolin was encouraged and coached by the Beach Boys to perform his own vocals on this album as well. Session players on this record included David Foster, David Sanborn, Jan Hammer, Stanley Sheldon, Jeff Porcaro, Phil Collins, and Glenn Hughes (uncredited due to contractual reasons). During the recording of this album, he was contacted by Deep Purple.

After Ritchie Blackmore left Deep Purple, the band had a meeting and discussed whether to disband or try to find a replacement, and chose the latter option. David Coverdale had been listening to the Billy Cobham LP Spectrum, on which Bolin played lead guitar on four songs. He decided he wanted Bolin in Deep Purple, and invited him over for a jam. He jammed with the band for four hours and the job was his. The band then relocated to Munich, Germany, to begin work on Come Taste the Band. Bolin wrote or co-wrote seven of the record's nine tracks, including the instrumental "Owed to G", which was a tribute to George Gershwin. Come Taste the Band was released in October 1975, and Australian, Japanese and US tours ensued. Bolin's solo album Teaser was released in November, but his obligations to Deep Purple meant he could not support his own album with a tour.

A very sad stigma that followed Tommy joining these groups (James Gang, Deep Purple) was the fact that he was always a replacement. It was very hard for him to be on stage and hear, "Joe Walsh!" or "Where's Ritchie?" This is what haunted him during the English tour, was "Where's Ritchie?"... you know, booed off the stage. He played terribly, he was just so unhappy to be responded to like this. The reception was miserable, so his attitude was miserable.

— Karen Ulibarri-Hughes, Bolin's long-time girlfriend.

While the Come Taste the Band album sold moderately well and revitalized Deep Purple for a time, the concert tours had many low points. Audiences expected Bolin to play solos that sounded like Blackmore's, but the guitarists' styles were very different. Bolin's issues with hard drugs, plus fellow band member Glenn Hughes' cocaine addiction, also led to several below-par concert performances. One such concert in Tokyo came after Bolin had either passed out and fell asleep on his left arm for several hours (his account) or spiked his hand with low-quality heroin (the band's accusation). At showtime, he was only able to play simple barre chords in open tuning, with keyboardist Jon Lord having to play many of the guitar parts on the organ. Unfortunately, this concert was recorded for a live album: Last Concert in Japan. Despite pleas by band members to not release the album, it came out in Japan and found its way into the UK and the US. A better concert recording by this Deep Purple lineup was made in Long Beach, California in early 1976, and released in 1995 as King Biscuit Flower Hour Presents: Deep Purple in Concert. Deep Purple Mk IV disbanded in July 1976.

=== The Tommy Bolin Band and second solo album ===
Bolin was now free to form the Tommy Bolin Band and hit the road touring while making plans for a second solo album. The Tommy Bolin Band had a rotating cast of players which included Narada Michael Walden, Mark Stein, Norma Jean Bell, Reggie McBride, Jimmy Haslip, Max Carl Gronenthal and eventually Bolin's younger brother, Johnnie Bolin, on drums.

By mid-1976, CBS Records signed Bolin and he began to record Private Eyes, his second and last solo record, in June. The album was released in September and a supporting tour ensued.

== Death ==
Bolin's tour for Private Eyes were his final live appearances. He opened for Peter Frampton and Jeff Beck. In his final show, he opened for Beck on December 3, 1976 in Miami and performed a rendition of "Post Toastee" as an encore, his final live song. He also posed for his last photo, sitting backstage with Beck after the show, which appeared in Rolling Stone. The article in Rolling Stone said, "Just before Bolin's final concert, Jon Marlowe of The Miami News, after an interview with the guitarist, told him, 'Take care of yourself,' to which Bolin replied, 'I've been taking care of myself my whole life. Don't worry about me. I'm going to be around for a long time.'" (Issue No. 230; page 14). Hours later, Bolin died from an overdose of heroin and other substances, including alcohol, cocaine, and barbiturates. He is buried in Calvary Cemetery in Sioux City, Iowa.

Following Bolin's death, Ritchie Blackmore remarked: "He was a uniquely talented player and it's unfortunate that he never had the chance to develop with the band [Deep Purple] the way that I did. His death was an incredible loss, not only for Deep Purple but for guitar fans as well."

== Personal life ==
Bolin's father, Richard, was of Swedish descent, and his mother, Barbara, was the daughter of Syrian immigrants. His maternal grandfather, Abraham "Abe" Joseph, was a recording musician in Lebanon before immigrating to the US. The Bolin estate has about 15 records of his grandfather in the safe vault.

He had two younger brothers: Johnnie (drummer with Black Oak Arkansas), and Rick (a singer).

In a 1975 article, Tommy Bolin called himself an entirely self-taught guitarist who plays by ear, saying, "I only ever had four lessons. I don't know any scales at all. I know what to play, but don't know any scales because I never bothered to learn any."

== Tributes ==
In 2010, several well-known artists gathered to create a tribute album titled Mister Bolin's Late Night Revival, a compilation of 17 previously unreleased tracks written by Bolin. It includes works by HiFi Superstar, Doogie White, Eric Martin, Troy Luccketta, Jeff Pilson, Randy Jackson, Rex Carroll, Rachel Barton, Derek St. Holmes, Kimberley Dahme, and the 77s. A percentage of the proceeds from the project was given to benefit the Jackson Recovery Centers.

Producer Greg Hampton (who has previously worked on archival Bolin releases including Whips and Roses) co-produced (with Gov't Mule leader Warren Haynes) and a tribute to Bolin, Tommy Bolin and Friends: Great Gypsy Soul, which was released in 2012, and featured contributions from Brad Whitford, Nels Cline, John Scofield, Myles Kennedy, Derek Trucks, Steve Morse, and Peter Frampton among others.

On December 3, 2019, Tommy Bolin was inducted into the Colorado Music Hall of Fame.

== Discography ==
| Year | Recorded | Artist | Album | Notes |
|---|---|---|---|---|
| 1969 | 1969 | Zephyr | Zephyr | Studio |
| 1971 | 1971 | Zephyr | Going Back to Colorado | Studio |
| 1973 | 1973 | James Gang | Bang | Studio |
| 1973 | 1973 | Billy Cobham | Spectrum | Studio |
| 1974 | 1974 | James Gang | Miami | Studio |
| 1975 | 1974 | Alphonse Mouzon | Mind Transplant | Studio |
| 1975 | 1975 | Moxy | Moxy | Studio; guitar solos (6 tracks) |
| 1975 | 1975 | Deep Purple | Come Taste the Band | Studio |
| 1975; 2011 | 1975 | Tommy Bolin | Teaser; Teaser Deluxe | Studio; Remix |
| 1976 | 1976 | Tommy Bolin | Private Eyes | Studio |
| 1977; 2001 | 1975 | Deep Purple | Last Concert in Japan; This Time Around: Live in Tokyo | Live; Remixed & Expanded |
| 1995; 2000; 2009 | 1976 | Deep Purple | King Biscuit Flower Hour Presents: Deep Purple in Concert / On the Wings of a Russian Foxbat; Deep Purple: Extended Versions; Live at Long Beach 1976 | Live Remastered |
| 1989 | compilation | Tommy Bolin | The Ultimate: The Best of Tommy Bolin | Greatest Hits |
| 1996 | compilation | Tommy Bolin | From the Archives, Vol. 1 | Outtakes |
| 1997 | 1973 | Zephyr | Zephyr Live At Art's Bar And Grill, May 2, 1973 | Live |
| 1997 | 1974 | Tommy Bolin & Friends | Live at Ebbets Field 1974 | Live |
| 1997 | 1976 | Tommy Bolin | 1976: In His Own Words | Interview |
| 1997 | 1976 | Tommy Bolin Band | Live at Ebbets Field 1976 | Live |
| 1997 | 1976 | Tommy Bolin Band | Live at Northern Lights Recording Studio, Maynard, MA | Live |
| 1997 | compilation | Tommy Bolin | The Bottom Shelf, Volume 1 | Outtakes |
| 1997 | compilation | Tommy Bolin | From the Archives, Vol. 2 | Outtakes |
| 1998 | 1972 | Energy | The Energy Radio Broadcasts 1972 | Live |
| 1999 | 1967 | Patch of Blue | Patch of Blue Live! | Live |
| 1999 | 1972 | Energy | Energy | Unreleased Studio album |
| 1999 | 1974 | Alphonse Mouzon | Tommy Bolin & Alphonse Mouzon Fusion Jam | Jam Sessions |
| 1999 | compilation | Tommy Bolin | Come Taste the Man | Outtakes |
| 1999 | compilation | Tommy Bolin | Snapshot | Outtakes |
| 2000 | 1975 | Deep Purple | Days May Come and Days May Go – The California Rehearsals: June 1975 and 1420 Beachwood Drive: The 1975 Rehearsals, Volume 2 | Jam Sessions |
| 2000 | 1976 | Tommy Bolin Band | First Time Live | Live |
| 2000 | compilation | Tommy Bolin | Naked | Outtakes |
| 2001 | 1976 | Tommy Bolin Band | Live 9/19/76 | Live |
| 2002 | 1973 | Billy Cobham | Love Child: The Spectrum Sessions | Jam Sessions |
| 2002 | 1976 | Tommy Bolin Band | Live in Miami at Jai Alai: The Final Show | Live |
| 2002 | compilation | Tommy Bolin | Naked II | Outtakes |
| 2002 | compilation | Tommy Bolin | After Hours: The Glen Holly Jams, Volume 1 | Jam sessions |
| 2003 | 1972 | Energy | Live at Tulagi in Boulder and Rooftop Ballroom in Sioux City, December 1972 | Live |
| 2003 | 1976 | Tommy Bolin Band | Alive on Long Island | Live |
| 2004 | compilation | Billy Cobham | Rudiments: The Billy Cobham Anthology | greatest Hts |
| 2005 | 1976 | Tommy Bolin Band | Albany NY, September 20, 1976 | Live |
| 2005 | 1976 | Tommy Bolin Band | Live at the Jet Bar | Live |
| 2005 | 1972 | Energy | Energy | Disc 1: Energy studio CD; Disc 2: Live at Tulagi and Rooftop Ballroom |
| 2006 | 1975 | Tommy Bolin | Whips and Roses | Teaser outtakes |
| 2006 | 1975 | Tommy Bolin | Whips and Roses II | Teaser outtakes |
| 2008 | compilation | Tommy Bolin | The Ultimate Redux | Greatest Hits & Outtakes |
| 2011 | 1975–1976 | Deep Purple | Phoenix Rising | CD: 1975/1976 tour live album; DVD: Documentary and Rises Over Japan |
| 2013 | compilation | Tommy Bolin | Whirlwind | Outtakes |
| 2014 | 1973–1976 | Tommy Bolin | Captured Raw Jams, Vol. 1 | Jam Sessions |
| 2021 | 1976? | Tommy Bolin | Shake the Devil: The Lost Sessions | alternates, demos, and outtakes from Private Eyes |

=== Tribute albums ===
- Glenn Hughes, Johnnie Bolin & Friends - Tommy Bolin: 1997 Tribute (1998)
- Mister Bolin's Late Night Revival (2010)
- Tommy Bolin and Friends: Great Gypsy Soul (2012)

== Bibliography ==
- Popoff, Martin (2008). Gettin' Tighter: Deep Purple '68–'76. Power Chord Press. ASIN 0-9811057-1-8
- Prato, Greg (2008). Touched by Magic: The Tommy Bolin Story. Createspace. ISBN 0-5780031-7-1
- Smets, Eric (2012). Tommy Bolin: Voodoo Child (French Edition). Camion Blanc. ASIN B-00CW9WP-7-8
- Thompson, Dave (2004). Smoke on the Water: The Deep Purple Story. ECW Press. ISBN 1-5502261-8-5
