= The New Czars =

American hard rock band

- Origin: Los Angeles, California, U.S.
- Genres: Hard rock, alternative rock
- Years active: 2009-present
- Members: Greg Hampton, Paul Ill, Dave Moreno
- Website: The New Czars on MySpace

The New Czars is a hard rock band from Los Angeles, California.

== History ==
Singer/guitarist Greg Hampton has worked with and/or produced some of rock music's most notable acts, including Alice Cooper, Lita Ford, Bootsy Collins, and Buckethead. The bass guitarist Paul Ill and the drummer Dave Moreno have built impressive resumes in collaboration with Reeves Gabrels, Bruce Dickinson, Puddle of Mudd, Courtney Love, Pink, and more.

== Doomsday Revolution ==
The New Czar's first album, Doomsday Revolution, was released September on 14, 2010, on Samson Records. About the album, Hampton explained, "You can hear some of the elements of the past records I've been involved in. There's an inherent nature in my writing direction, which stems from my roots. I had been raised in the South in the blues-rock/funky vein, but there are some industrial rock, pop and progressive elements to our music." Produced by Hampton, Doomsday Revolution also includes contributions on the six-string by Adrian Belew. "His sensibilities for progressive and weird music and bizarre pop stuff are certainly on par with my thinking," Hampton said about Belew.

The album earned early praise, when Michael Molenda reviewed it in Guitar Player, writing, "Hybrids of pop and the avant-garde can be inspiring, but when they go bad, it's like Mount Vesuvius bad. But the New Czars nail it. Their music has all the stunning surprises that make great experimental music so thrilling, and they top it off with monstrous grooves and compelling melodies."

== Discography ==
=== Album ===
- Doomsday Revolution (2010), Samson Records
