= King Biscuit Flower Hour Presents: Deep Purple in Concert =

Live album by Deep Purple
- Released: July 1995
- Recorded: 27 February 1976 (Long Beach, CA); 26 January 1976 (Springfield, MA)
- Genre: Hard rock, heavy metal
- Length: 122:13
- Label: King Biscuit Flower Hour
- Producer: Deep Purple

Deep Purple live albums chronology
Come Hell or High Water (1994)	King Biscuit Flower Hour Presents: Deep Purple in Concert (1995)	California Jamming (1996)

On the Wings of a Russian Foxbat CD cover

Extended Versions CD cover

Live at Long Beach 1976 CD cover

Professional ratings
Review scores
Source	Rating
AllMusic	3/5 stars
Collector's Guide to Heavy Metal	7/10

King Biscuit Flower Hour Presents: Deep Purple in Concert is a live album taken from a Deep Purple performance originally broadcast on the King Biscuit Flower Hour, released in July 1995. It contains concert material recorded on 27 February 1976 at Long Beach Arena, Los Angeles, CA featuring the Mark IV line-up with Tommy Bolin.

== Overview ==
The concert was recorded on 27 February 1976 at Long Beach Arena, Los Angeles, CA. The album also contains four bonus tracks recorded at a Deep Purple concert on 26 January 1976 in Springfield, MA. This concert was originally intended to be used for the King Biscuit broadcast, but imperfections in the recording made the entire show unsuitable for airing and forced the second taping in Long Beach one month later.

== Releases ==
The album was released in the U.K. in June 1995 with the title On the Wings of a Russian Foxbat (Connoisseur DPVSOP CD 217). In 2000, a partial set consisting of ten songs was published by BMG under the name Extended Versions. The album was remastered and re-released with new cover art as Live at Long Beach 1976 on 24 February 2009 by Purple Records. The 2009 edition was re-released by earMusic in 2016 as Long Beach 1976.

Note the CD1 track listing quotes "The Grind" as being performed; this is incorrect as it is the Bolin solo song "Homeward Strut".

== Track listing ==
=== Standard version ===
Disc 1
No.	Title	Length
1.	"Burn" (Ritchie Blackmore, David Coverdale, Jon Lord, Ian Paice)	8:15
2.	"Lady Luck" (Jeff Cook, Coverdale)	3:06
3.	"Gettin' Tighter" (Tommy Bolin, Glenn Hughes)	13:54
4.	"Love Child" (Coverdale, Bolin)	5:35
5.	"Smoke on the Water/Georgia on My Mind" (Blackmore, Ian Gillan, Roger Glover, Lord, Paice/Hoagy Carmichael, Stuart Gorrell)	9:15
6.	"Lazy" (Blackmore, Gillan, Glover, Lord, Paice)	17:04
7.	"The Grind (Homeward Strut)" (Bolin)	5:51

Disc 2
No.	Title	Length
1.	"This Time Around" (Hughes, Lord)	7:16
2.	"Tommy Bolin Guitar Solo" (Bolin)	10:30
3.	"Stormbringer" (Coverdale, Blackmore)	9:50
4.	"Highway Star/Not Fade Away" (Blackmore, Gillan, Glover, Lord, Paice/Buddy Holly, Norman Petty)	8:19

Bonus tracks (Springfield, Mass 26 January 1976)
No.	Title	Length
5.	"Smoke on the Water" (Blackmore, Gillan, Glover, Lord, Paice)	9:31
6.	"Going Down" (Don Nix)	7:25
7.	"Highway Star" (Blackmore, Gillan, Glover, Lord, Paice)	6:22

=== Extended Versions ===
No.	Title	Length
1.	"Burn"	8:15
2.	"Lady Luck"	3:13
3.	"Highway Star/Not Fade Away"	7:16
4.	"This Time Around"	7:05
5.	"Going Down"	7:29
6.	"Highway Star"	5:34
7.	"Smoke on the Water"	6:44
8.	"Georgia on My Mind"	2:50
9.	"Tommy Bolin Guitar Solo"	10:32
10.	"Love Child"	5:49

=== Live at Long Beach 1976 ===
Disc 1
No.	Title	Length
1.	"Introduction"	2:00
2.	"Burn"	6:50
3.	"Lady Luck" (Cook / Coverdale)	2:52
4.	"Gettin' Tighter"	13:28
5.	"Love Child"	5:11
6.	"Smoke on the Water"	8:44
7.	"Lazy"	16:41
8.	"Homeward Strut" (Bolin)	5:55

Disc 2
No.	Title	Length
1.	"This Time Around" (Hughes, Lord)	4:25
2.	"Owed to 'G'" (Bolin)	2:52
3.	"Tommy Bolin Guitar Solo"	10:32
4.	"Stormbringer"	10:08
5.	"Highway Star"	7:16

Bonus tracks (Springfield, Massachusetts 26 January 1976)
No.	Title	Length
6.	"Smoke on the Water"	9:29
7.	"Going Down"	7:43
8.	"Highway Star"	6:25

== Personnel ==
Deep Purple

- David Coverdale – lead vocals
- Tommy Bolin – guitars, vocals
- Jon Lord – keyboards, organ, synthesizers, backing vocals
- Glenn Hughes – bass, vocals
- Ian Paice – drums, percussion

Production

- Gary Lyons – mixing and mastering
- Evert Wilbrink, Steve Ship, Barry Ehrmann, Michael Berrshein – executive producers
