= Eli Cook (musician) =

American singer-songwriter (born 1986)

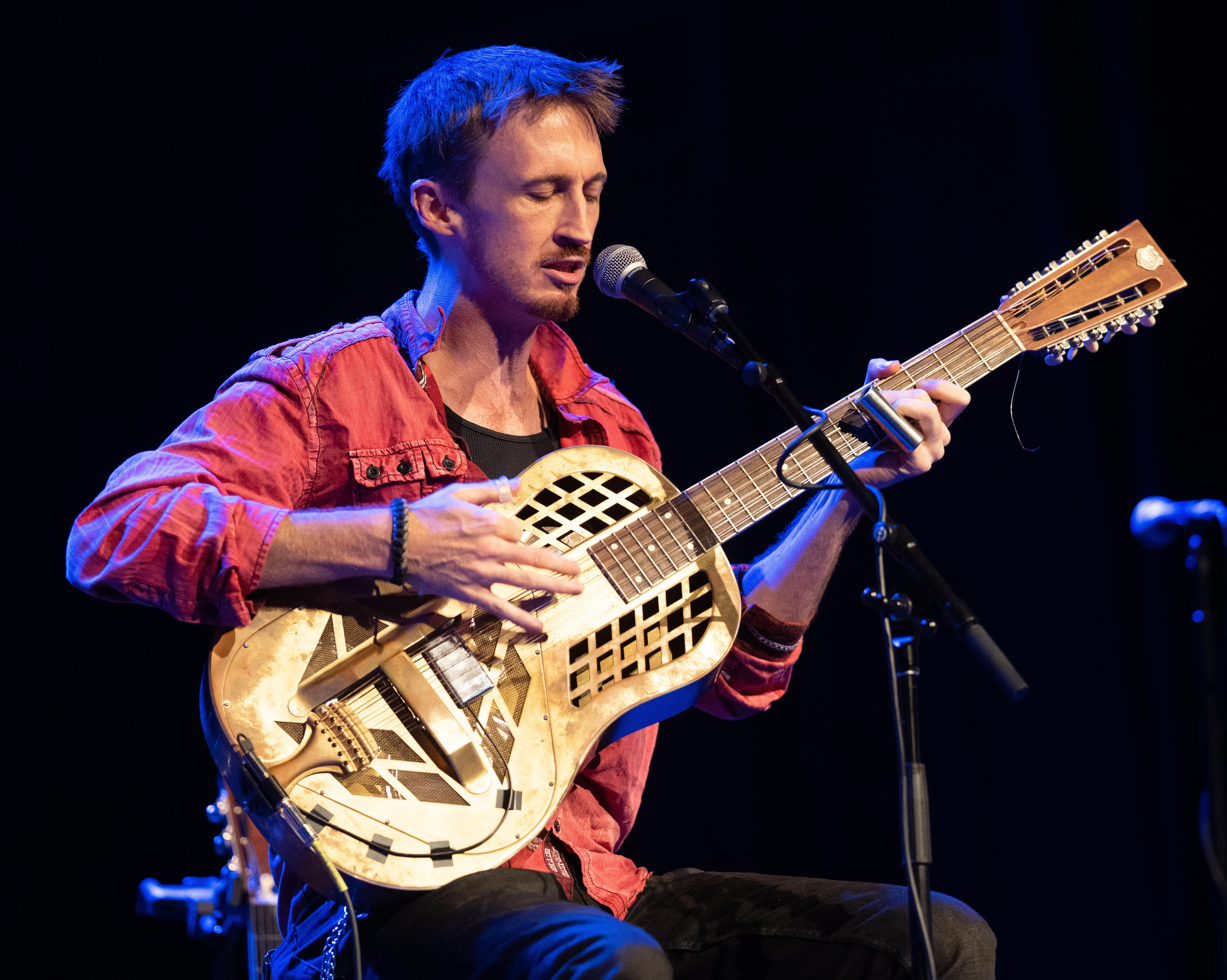
- Performing at the Jefferson Theater (Virginia) on July 16, 2022.

Background information
- Born: Eli Hudnall Cook; April 24, 1986 (age 40); Lynchburg, Virginia, United States
- Genres: Blues; folk; rock; blues metal; country rock; grunge; R&B
- Occupations: Singer; songwriter; guitarist; record producer
- Instruments: guitar; vocals
- Years active: 2000s–present
- Labels: C.R. 8 Records; Cleopatra Records; Valley Entertainment
- Website: elicook.com

Eli Hudnall Cook (born April 24, 1986) is an American singer, songwriter, guitarist and record producer. He is known for an eclectic style, with a focus on blues and blues rock. His deep, rich baritone voice and guitar playing have drawn widespread acclaim.

== Life and career ==
=== Early years ===
Cook was raised in the backwoods of Faber, Virginia, near the Blue Ridge Mountains. Inspired by a lack of television and his parents' diverse record collection, he picked up the guitar at age 13, imitating the styles of Mississippi John Hurt and Fred McDowell.

Two years later, he began performing acoustic blues at Rapunzel's Coffee House in Lovingston. As a student at Monticello High School, his first power trio, 'The Red House Blues Band' (an apparent nod to Jimi Hendrix's Are You Experienced? track), was formed with rotating membership. By age 18, Cook was playing church revivals solo, and touring the bar scene with his band throughout central Virginia. Because of this, he built a reputation as a prodigy of both electric and acoustic performance, and was often featured in local publications.

=== Recent years ===
Cook plays gigs mostly around Virginia, and resides in Charlottesville.

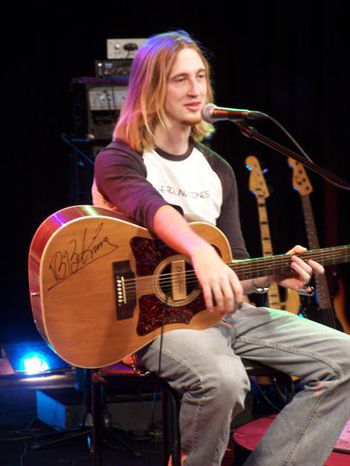
Playing B.B. King signed guitar in 2007

=== Noteworthy appearances ===
Cook's first break happened in 2007 when he was asked to open for B.B. King at multiple shows. Since then, he has shared the stage with Johnny Winter, Robert Cray, Robin Trower, Parliament-Funkadelic, Shemekia Copeland, Gary Clark, Jr., and Roomful of Blues. He has performed on the Millennium Stage at the John F. Kennedy Center for the Performing Arts and at the South by Southwest Festival in 2014. Cook has also opened for John Mayall at The Hamilton and Big Wreck at Union Stage, both in Washington, D.C.

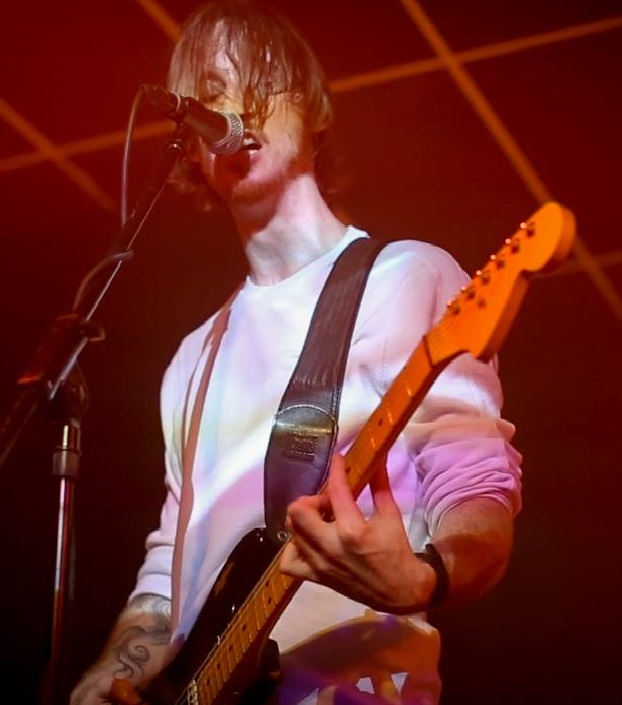
Performing with his band at the Primitive Son release party on April 30, 2014

=== Releases ===
Three of Cook's first four albums, Moonshine Mojo, Electricholyfirewater, and Static in the Blood, were independent releases that each displayed unique moods: guitar focused country rock, blues metal, and experimental R&B, respectively.

Valley Entertainment internationally reissued his 2005 recording, Miss Blues' Child, in 2007. It included Cook's versions of Jimmy Reed's "Baby What You Want Me to Do" and Bukka White's "Fixin' To Die."

2011 saw the release of Ace, Jack & King, which showcased a mix of the various genres for which he is known.

In 2013, Cook signed a recording contract with Cleopatra Records. The ensuing album, Primitive Son (2014), contained guest appearances by Vinny Appice and Artimus Pyle (drums); Tinsley Ellis, Eric Gales, Leslie West, Pat Travers and Harvey Mandel (guitar); Sonny Landreth (slide guitar); Rod Piazza (harmonica); and Reese Wynans (Hammond B3 organ). The album was co-produced by Greg Hampton.

In August 2017, he released High-Dollar Gospel on the C.R. 8 Records label to a positive reception.

== Equipment ==
Cook performs solo on a resophonic guitar by National and a 12-string acoustic guitar made by Rockbridge Guitars in Charlottesville, Virginia. Both instruments are electrified supplementally. With the band, he plays a customized Fender Stratocaster and Telecaster.

== Acclaim ==
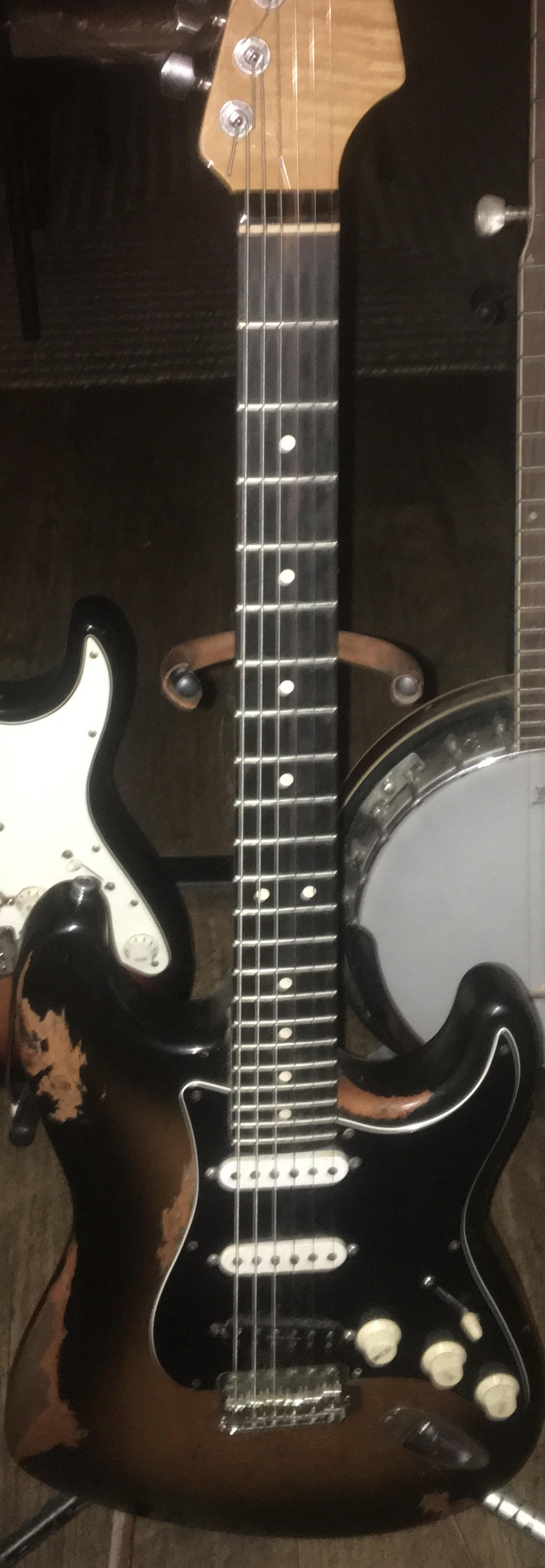
Cook's main strat: a fully customized 1950s reissue

Blues Matters! magazine featured Cook on the cover of its October/November (No. 86) issue. He was listed in its 2015 Writer's Poll as the third most "Favorite International Blues Solo Artist."

Most of his albums have been reviewed favorably in the press, including positive reviews in Vintage Guitar magazine.

Leslie West said of recording with him, "I have heard quite a few guitar players that are young and just starting out. When I was asked to play a track with Eli Cook I wanted to see if there was something there. Believe me when I tell you THERE IS SOMETHING THERE! I hope you enjoy listening to it as much as I did playing on it. Eli is on his way!"

Tinsley Ellis called him a "triple threat, obviously a great guitarist but also an emotive singer and an innovative songwriter. He’s in the vanguard of young, 21st-century blues rockers!"

AllMusic stated in their review of Miss Blues' Child, "he has what it takes to be the best blues singer of his generation."

== Discography ==
=== Studio albums ===
- Moonshine Mojo (2004)
- Electricholyfirewater (2007)
- Miss Blues' Child (2007)
- Static in the Blood (2009)
- Ace, Jack & King (2011)
- Primitive Son (2014)
- High-Dollar Gospel (2017)

=== EPs ===
- All Night Thing (2020)

=== Singles ===
- "Baby Please Don't Go" (2014)

== See also ==
- List of electric blues musicians
