= Dream Factor =

Studio album by Jack Casady
- Released: June 17, 2003
- Recorded: 2003 at J. C. Studios, Los Angeles, CA and Soundtrack Studios, New York City, NY
- Label: Eagle Records
- Producer: Greg Hampton; Jack Casady (exec.)

Dream Factor is Jack Casady's first solo album, released on Eagle Records. The album was created by Jack first writing songs on guitar and then bringing musicians into his studio to help record his vision.

== Track listing ==
Studio tracks from liner notes

1. Paradise (Jack Casady, Greg Hampton, Paul Barrere) – 3:41
2. Water from a Stone (Casady, Jeff Pehrson) – 3:46
3. Trust Somebody (Casady, Jim Brunberg) – 4:59
4. Listen to the Wind (Hampton, Danny Tate) – 5:08
5. Outside (Casady) – 6:22
6. By Your Side (Casady, Brunberg, Pehrson) – 6:01
7. Daddy's Lil' Girl (Casady, Stacy Parrish) – 4:51
8. Weight of Sin (Casady, Pehrson) – 4:58
9. Who You Are (Casady, Pehrson) – 3:38
10. Dead Letter Box (Casady, Barrere) – 5:15
11. Sweden (Casady, Fee Waybill) – 5:49

== Personnel ==
Personnel information from liner notes

- Jack Casady – bass on all tracks, lead versatone bass on "Outside" and "Who You Are", guitar on "Water from a Stone" and "Sweden", acoustic bass balalaika on "Weight of Sin", acoustic guitar on "Water from a Stone", "By Your Side", and "Weight of Sin"
- Paul Barrere – vocals and slide guitar on "Paradise", "Listen to the Wind", and "Dead Letter Box"
- Jeff Pehrson – vocals on "Water from a Stone", "Weight of Sin", and "Who You Are", background vocals on "Listen to the Wind" and "By Your Side"
- Ivan Neville – vocals on "Trust Somebody" and "Daddy's Lil' Girl", keyboards on "Trust Somebody"
- Jim Brunberg – vocals on "By Your Side", mandolin on "Water from a Stone" and "Weight of Sin", background vocals on "Listen to the Wind"
- Fee Waybill – vocals on "Sweden"
- Doyle Bramhall II – lead guitar on "Trust Somebody", "Daddy's Lil' Girl", and "Dead Letter Box", rhythm guitar on "Daddy's Lil' Girl"
- Jorma Kaukonen – acoustic lead guitar on "Listen to the Wind", lead guitar on "Sweden"
- Warren Haynes – lead guitar on "Outside" and "Sweden"
- Steve Fister – rhythm guitar on "Paradise", "Trust Somebody", "Outside", "Daddy's Lil' Girl", "Dead Letter Box", and "Sweden", guitars on "Who You Are"
- Greg Hampton – rhythm guitar on "Listen to the Wind", "Outside", and "Daddy's Lil' Girl", guitar on "Paradise", background vocals on "By Your Side"
- Stacy Parrish – acoustic guitar on "Weight of Sin", background vocals on "By Your Side"
- Diana Quine – background vocals on "By Your Side"
- Steffen Presley – keyboards
- Steve Gorman – drums on "Paradise", "Daddy's Lil' Girl", "Who You Are", and "Sweden"
- Matt Abts – drums and percussion on all other tracks except "Weight of Sin"

=== Production ===
- Greg Hampton – producer, mixing engineer
- Jack Casady – executive producer
- Stacy Parrish, Steve Werbelow, Michael Barbiero – engineers
- Michael Zinczenko – assistant engineer
- Vin Cimino – art
- Chris Cassidy – photography
- Mastered by Louie Teran at Marcussen Mastering, Los Angeles, CA
