= Earshot =

American alternative metal band

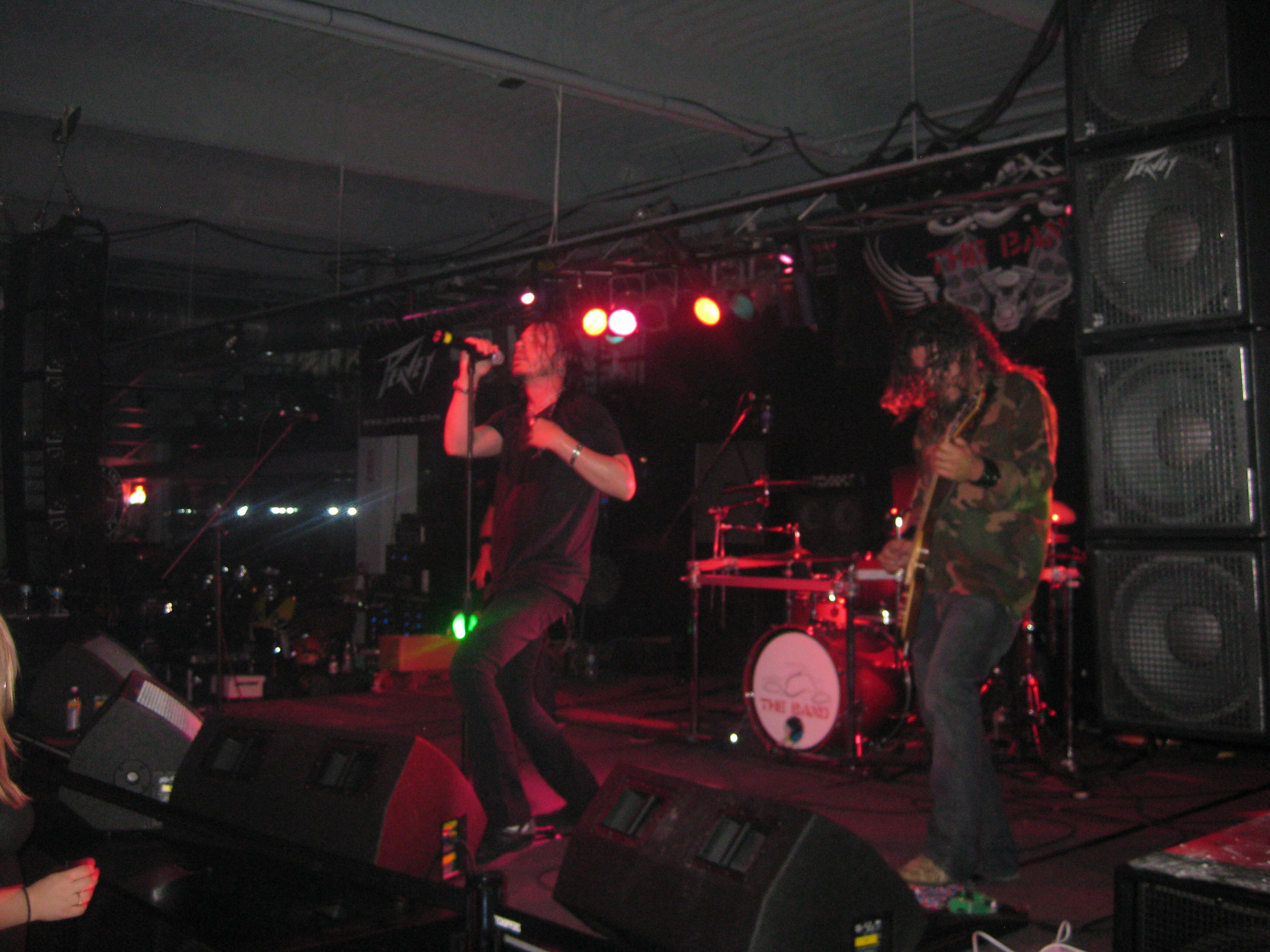
- Earshot performing in 2009

Background information
- Origin: Los Angeles, California, U.S.
- Genres: Alternative metal; nu metal
- Years active: 1999–2010; 2014–present
- Labels: Warner Bros.; Fontana; Universal Records; InDeGoot; Judge & Jury
- Members: Wil Martin; Mike Sylvia; Aaron Fink; John Novak
- Past members: Guy Couturier; Johnny Sprague; Billy Blair; "Rooster"; Scott Kohler; Mike Callahan; Travis Arnold; Chris Loveless; Andy Stafford; Josh Guinn; Todd Wyatt; Chas Stumbo; Darren Pfeifer
- Website: earshotband.com

Earshot is an American alternative metal band formed in Los Angeles in 1999. The band's lineup has changed several times during their existence, with vocalist Wil Martin being the band's sole constant member.

After signing to Warner Bros. Records, Earshot issued their debut album Letting Go (2002), which spawned the hit single "Get Away". The band's second album, Two (2004), also produced a hit single, "Wait". The band has since put out three more releases, The Silver Lining (2008), the extended play Aftermath (2015), and Humaning (2025).

== History ==
=== Formation and Letting Go (1999–2002) ===
Earshot formed in 1999, with singer Wil Martin collaborating with guitarist Scott Kohler, bassist Guy Couturier, and drummer Todd Wyatt in Los Angeles. Bassist Johnny Sprague and guitarist Mike Callahan joined the band shortly after their debut was completed. Singer-songwriter Martin has cited Led Zeppelin, The Beatles, Metallica, Thin Lizzy, U2, Soundgarden, and Tool as influences and inspirations. In 2001, the band signed with Warner Bros. Records. Earshot appeared with Alien Ant Farm, Adema, and Glassjaw during the SnoCore Rock Tour in early 2002.

Letting Go, Earshot's debut album, was released on May 7, 2002. It reached number 82 on the Billboard 200, and remained on the chart for five weeks. It featured their first single, "Get Away," which received significant radio airplay. The album's second single, "Not Afraid," was also released in 2002. The songs "Get Away", "We Fall, We Stand", and "Headstrong" were included in the 2002 video game Legends of Wrestling II for the PlayStation 2, GameCube, and Xbox. The song "Headstrong" was featured on the soundtrack for the film Queen of the Damned. The song "Ordinary Girl" was included in the 2003 video game Project Gotham Racing 2 for the Xbox. After months of touring with Staind, Kid Rock, and Stone Temple Pilots, "Get Away" peaked at No. 4 on the chart and stayed in the Top 100 for over 60 weeks. Earshot returned to the studio in 2003 after spending much of the previous year on the road. Despite its success, Warner Bros. never made a proper music video for the song. Producer David Kahne favoured "Ordinary Girl" as the album's second single, but Warner Bros. chose to release "Not Afraid" instead, which did not replicate the success of "Get Away".

Nearly two months after the album's release, Letting Go had shifted 47,000 copies, and by November 2002 the album had sold over 100,000 copies in the United States.

=== Two (2003–2006) ===
The band's second album, Two, was released on June 22, 2004. It charted at 127 on the Billboard 200 and remained on the chart for two weeks. It includes the breakthrough hit "Wait," which was included in the video games Madden NFL 2005 in 2004 and MX vs. ATV Unleashed in 2005. It was also featured in the DVD Tampa Bay Lightning 2004 Stanley Cup Champions. The album's second single, "Someone", was also released in 2004. The song "Down" was included in the video game Gretzky NHL 2005 in 2004. That year, the band opened for Megadeth.

=== The Silver Lining (2007–2008) ===
In early 2007, Earshot signed with Indegoot/Fontana/Universal Recordings, and began working on a new album, produced by Brian Garcia and co-produced by Martin. Tracks on the album include "MisSunderstood," "Closer," "Where the Pain Begins," "Wasted," "Sometimes," "Don't Hate Me," and "Go". The band posted its new single, "MisSunderstood," on their MySpace page at 12AM (EST) on May 13, 2008. The official nationwide radio release date for the single was May 26, 2008. The Silver Lining was released on August 26, 2008.

=== The Ugly Truth and breakup (2009–2010) ===
On October 20, 2009, the band released a free single through their website called "The Ugly Truth". In 2010, Martin announced the band would split.

=== Reunion and Aftermath (2014–2019) ===
On May 7, 2014, Earshot released a new single, "Now That It's Over," from their five-song "Mini-LP" entitled Aftermath via iTunes, Amazon, as well as their official website. The second single, "Let Me," was released on June 24, 2014. The third single, "Remember," was released on September 8, 2014. Aftermath was released on April 16, 2015.

=== Been a Long Time, You + I (2020–2022) ===
On May 14, 2020, Earshot released a cover of "Uninvited" by Alanis Morissette through all major digital platforms.

On January 1, 2021, Earshot released "Been a Long Time" through all major digital platforms. On February 14, 2022, the band released "You + I" through all major digital platforms.

=== Humaning and label move (2025) ===
On October 10, 2025, Earshot released their fourth album Humaning. Initially released on digital platforms, a physical release is scheduled for 2026 through the band's independent label Earshot Entertainment Inc. On August 25, 2026, Earshot released the single "Love Left" under Judge & Jury Records.

== Band members ==
Current

- Wil Martin – vocals (1999–2010, 2019–present)
- Aaron Fink – guitar (2019–present)
- Dave Henriquez – guitar (2025–present)
- Jay Musgrove – bass (2026–present)
- Brett Weir – drums (2025–present)

Former

- Guy Couturier – bass (1998–2002)
- Todd Wyatt – drums (1998–2000)
- Chris Lennon -guitar (1998-1999)
- Johnny Sprague – bass (2002–2005)
- Billy Blair – bass (2005–2009)
- "Rooster" – bass (2009–2010)
- Scott Kohler – guitar (1999–2009)
- Mike Callahan – guitar (2001–2005)
- Travis Arnold – guitar (2005–2009)
- Chris Loveless – guitar (2009–2010)
- Josh Guinn – guitar (2009–2010)
- Andy Stafford – guitar (2020–2022)
- Chas Stumbo – drums (2003–2005)
- Darren Pfeifer – drums (2005–2010)
- John Novak – bass (2019–2025)
- Mike Sylvia – drums (2019–2025)

== Discography ==
Earshot discography
- Studio albums: 4
- Extended plays: 1
- Singles: 11
- Music videos: 3

=== Studio albums ===
List of studio albums, with selected chart positions and sales figures
Title	Details	Peak chart positions	Sales
Title	Details	US	Sales
Letting Go	Released: May 7, 2002; Label: Warner Bros.; Format: CD, DD	82	US: 100,000+
Two	Released: June 22, 2004; Label: Warner Bros.; Format: CD, DD	127	
The Silver Lining	Released: August 26, 2008; Label: Indegoot / Fontana; Format: CD	—	
Humaning	Released: October 10, 2025; Label: Earshot Inc.; Format: DD	—	
"—" denotes a recording that did not chart or was not released in that territory.

=== Extended plays ===
Title	Details
Aftermath	Released: April 16, 2015; Label: Earshot Inc.; Format: DD

=== Singles ===
Year	Title	Chart peak positions		Album
Year	Title	US Main. Rock	US Alt.	Album
2002	"Get Away"	6	20	Letting Go
2002	"Not Afraid"	24	—	Letting Go
2004	"Wait"	13	33	Two
2004	"Someone"	27	—	Two
2008	"MisSunderstood"	38	—	The Silver Lining
2009	"The Ugly Truth"	—	—	Non-album single
2014	"Now That It's Over"	—	—	Aftermath EP
2014	"Let Me"	—	—	Aftermath EP
2014	"Remember"	—	—	Aftermath EP
2020	"Uninvited"	—	—	Non-album single
2021	"Been a Long Time"	—	—	Non-album single
2022	"You + I"	—	—	Non-album single
2025	"Where Were You?"	×	×	Non-album single
2025	"Out of My Hands"	×	×	Non-album single
2026	"Love Left"	×	×	Non-album single

=== Music videos ===
Year	Title
2002	"Get Away"
2002	"Not Afraid"
2004	"Wait"
2021	"Been a Long Time"
2026	"Love Left"
