= Private Eyes (Tommy Bolin album) =

Studio album by Tommy Bolin
- Released: September 1976
- Recorded: June 1976
- Studio: Cherokee Studios (Los Angeles, CA); Trident Studios (London, England)
- Genre: Hard rock, Jazz rock
- Length: 37:33
- Label: Columbia
- Producer: Dennis MacKay; Tommy Bolin

Tommy Bolin chronology
| Teaser (1975) | Private Eyes (1976) |

Professional ratings
Review scores
| Source | Rating |
|---|---|
| Allmusic | link |

Private Eyes is the second and final solo album by guitarist Tommy Bolin. He subsequently died of a drug overdose while on the promotional tour, opening for Jeff Beck.

== Track listing ==
1. "Bustin' Out for Rosey" (Bolin) – 4:24
2. "Sweet Burgundy" (Bolin, Jeff Cook) – 4:13
3. "Post Toastee" (Bolin) – 9:03
4. "Shake the Devil" (Bolin, Cook) – 3:47
5. "Gypsy Soul" (Bolin, Cook) – 4:05
6. "Someday We'll Bring Our Love Home" (Bolin, John Tesar) – 3:05
7. "Hello, Again" (Bolin, Cook) – 3:39
8. "You Told Me That You Loved Me" (Bolin) – 5:15

== Personnel ==
- Tommy Bolin – Guitars, Keyboards, Vocals, Piano
- Reggie McBride – Bass, Vocals
- Mark Stein – Keyboards, Vocals
- Carmine Appice – Drums on "Someday We'll Bring Our Love Home"
- Bobby Berge – Percussion, Drums
- Bobbye Hall – Percussion
- Norma Jean Bell – Percussion, Vocals, Saxophone
- Del Newman – string arrangements

== Production ==
- Produced by Tommy Bolin & Dennis MacKay
- Engineered by Thomas La Tonore and Stephen W Tayler
- Album design by Jimmy Wachtel and Lorrie Sullivan
