= Teaser (Tommy Bolin album) =

Studio album by Tommy Bolin
- Released: November 17, 1975
- Recorded: July 1975
- Studio: The Record Plant, Los Angeles; Electric Lady Studios, New York City; Trident Studios, London
- Length: 37:38
- Label: Nemperor
- Producer: Tommy Bolin, Lee Kiefer

Tommy Bolin chronology
Teaser (1975)	Private Eyes (1976)

Professional ratings
Review scores
Source	Rating
AllMusic	4.5/5 stars
The Rolling Stone Record Guide	3/5 stars

Teaser is the 1975 debut solo album from American guitarist Tommy Bolin.

== Background ==
Teaser was released in conjunction with the album Come Taste the Band by Deep Purple, on which Bolin also played guitar.

This album is cherished by fans for the broad range of styles in Bolin's playing. The material spans hard rock, blues rock, jazz, reggae and Latin music, often blending these styles together within a single song. It is also considered by many to be some of Bolin's greatest recordings in his short career.

The song "Teaser" was covered by American hard rock band Mötley Crüe on the charity album Stairway to Heaven/Highway to Hell.

Van Halen would often cover "The Grind" live in its early club days.

== Reception ==
Upon its release on November 17, 1975, Teaser received considerable praise from critics. However, due to Bolin's obligations with Deep Purple, he was unable to promote the album with a solo tour. Despite Nemperor adding a "Guitarist for Deep Purple" sticker to the wrapping, sales were not as good as hoped, as it barely cracked the top 100 albums on Billboard in early 1976. Per an agreement with Bolin, Deep Purple had performed the songs "Homeward Strut" and "Wild Dogs" off the Teaser album during their Come Taste the Band world tour in 1975–76.

== Track listing ==
1. "The Grind" (Bolin, Jeff Cook, Stanley Sheldon, John Tesar) – 3:29
2. "Homeward Strut" (Bolin) – 3:57
3. "Dreamer" (Jeff Cook) – 5:09
4. "Savannah Woman" (Bolin, Jeff Cook) – 2:47
5. "Teaser" (Bolin, Jeff Cook) – 4:26
6. "People, People" (Bolin) – 4:56
7. "Marching Powder" (Bolin) – 4:14
8. "Wild Dogs" (Bolin, John Tesar) – 4:40
9. "Lotus" (Bolin, John Tesar) – 3:57

== Personnel ==
- Tommy Bolin - lead vocals, guitars
- Stanley Sheldon - bass (1, 2, 3, 5, 6, 7)
- Paul Stallworth - bass (4, 8, 9)
- David Foster - piano, synthesizer (1, 2, 3)
- Jan Hammer - synthesizer (6, 7), drums (6)
- Ron Fransen - piano (9)
- David Sanborn - saxophone (6, 7)
- Jeff Porcaro - drums (1, 2, 3, 5)
- Prairie Prince - drums (4, 8)
- Michael Walden - drums (7)
- Bobbie Berge - drums (9)
- Phil Collins - percussion (4)
- Sammy Figueroa - percussion (6, 7)
- Rafael Cruz - percussion (6, 7)
- Dave Brown - backing vocals (1)
- Lee Kiefer - backing vocals (1)
- Glenn Hughes - lead vocals (3, last verse, uncredited due to contractual issues)

== Charts ==
Chart (1976)	Peak position
US Billboard 200	96
