= The Silver Lining (Earshot album) =

Studio album by Earshot
- Released: August 26, 2008
- Genre: Alternative metal; post-grunge; hard rock
- Length: 41:55
- Label: InDeGoot, Fontana, Universal
- Producer: Brian Garcia; Wil Martin (co.)

Earshot chronology
Two (2004)	The Silver Lining (2008)

Singles from The Silver Lining
- 1. "MisSunderstood" Released: May 13, 2008

Professional ratings
Review scores
Source	Rating
About.com	2/5 stars
Allmusic	(positive)
antiMusic	3.5/5 stars
Melodic.net	3/5 stars
Sea of Tranquility	3.5/5 stars
Sputnikmusic	(3.1/5)

The Silver Lining is the third studio album by alternative metal band Earshot, released on August 26, 2008. It was the band's first album released since Two in 2004, and their first release outside of Warner Bros. Records. It contains just one officially released single, "MisSunderstood".

== Track listing ==
No.	Title	Writer(s)	Length
1.	"Closer"	Wil Martin; Travis Arnold	3:39
2.	"Don't Hate Me"	Martin	3:51
3.	"MisSunderstood"	Martin	3:31
4.	"Wasted"	Martin; Guy Couturier	3:40
5.	"Sometimes"	Martin; Couturier	3:58
6.	"I Hate You"	Martin	3:08
7.	"More Than I Ever Wanted"	Martin; Johnny Sprague	3:22
8.	"Beside Myself"	Martin	4:06
9.	"Pushing To Shove"	Martin; Sprague; Jerry Roe	3:45
10.	"Where the Pain Begins"	Martin; Sprague	4:11
11.	"Go"	Martin; Sprague	4:44
Total length:			41:55

== Personnel ==
- Wil Martin – Vocals/ Guitar
- Travis Arnold – Guitar
- Scott Kohler – Guitar
- Daren Pfeifer – Drums
- Billy Blair – Bass

== Singles ==
Year	Song	Chart	Peak position
2008	"MisSunderstood"	US Mainstream Rock	38
