= Greg Hampton =

American musician and producer

Greg Hampton is an American record producer, guitarist, singer, and songwriter who has worked on albums such as Alice Cooper's Along Came a Spider, Tommy Bolin's Whips and Roses, Lita Ford's Wicked Wonderland, and Eli Cook‘s Primitive Son. Hampton has performed as a member of several groups over the years including Science Faxtion (with Bootsy Collins and Buckethead), the New Czars (with Adrian Belew), and Razorball (with Reeves Gabrels). In 2011, it was announced that Hampton had formed a new project, 9 Chambers, with ex-Monster Magnet guitarist Ed Mundell, Gov't Mule bassist Jorgen Carlsson, and ex-Black Sabbath/Dio/Heaven & Hell drummer Vinny Appice.

Hampton's guitar set-up consists of Fender Stratocasters, Fender Telecasters, Fernanedes Ravelles, Gibson Les Pauls, a Gibson 335, a Gibson Firebird VII, a Danelectro Baritone, and a Roland/Fernandes Guitar Synthesizer. Hampton owns 45 guitars altogether, ten of which are equipped with Fernandes Sustainers, and also uses a Line 6 Spider/Bogner 100 Head, along with various pedals.

Hampton continues to be very involved in overseeing the legacy of Bolin's recordings. In addition to being interviewed for the Bolin biography Touched By Magic: The Tommy Bolin Story by author Greg Prato, Hampton has produced two volumes of the aforementioned Whips and Roses releases, as well as 2011's Teaser Deluxe. In 2012, he co-produced (with Gov't Mule's Warren Haynes) a Tommy Bolin tribute album, Tommy Bolin and Friends: Great Gypsy Soul, which includes performances by Toto's Steve Lukather, Aerosmith's Brad Whitford, Alter Bridge's Myles Kennedy, Wilco's Nels Cline, the Allman Brothers' Derek Trucks, and Bolin's former Deep Purple bandmate, Glenn Hughes among others.

== Discography (in alphabetical order) ==
- Alice Cooper - Along Came a Spider
- Alice Cooper - Theatre of Death (DVD/CD)
- Becca - 2nd Chance
- Black Oak Arkansas - The Wild Bunch
- Black Oak Arkansas - Latest and Greatest
- Calvin Russell - In Spite Of It All
- Chantel - Trenchcoat Blues
- Craig Erickson - Shine
- Derringer, Bogert, Appice - D.B.A.
- Derringer, Bogert, Appice - The Sky is Falling
- Dr John - Next Hex
- Eli Cook - Primitive Son
- Jack Casady - Dream Factor
- Leon Hendrix - Tricked by The Sun
- Lita Ford - Wicked Wonderland
- Mojo Lingo - Words, Wire & Barbed Wire
- Pat Travers - Stick With What You Know (LIVE)
- Pat Travers - PT=MC2
- Razorball - Razorball
- Rebekkah Star - Alien Nation
- Ron Wood - Not For Beginners
- Science Faxtion - Living on Another Frequency
- Scott Holt - Angels in Exile
- St.Jubilee - St. Jubilee
- The Entropy - The Kieff
- The New Czars - Doomsday Revolution
- THE Suffrajets - These Eyes
- The Tubes - Hoods From Outer Space
- Three Legged Dogg - Frozen Summer
- Tommy Bolin - Whips and Roses (VOL. 1)
- Tommy Bolin - Whips and Roses (VOL. 2)
- Tommy Bolin - Teaser Deluxe
- Travers and Appice - It Takes a Lot of Balls
- Travers and Appice - Live at The House of Blues
- Travers and Appice - Keep On Rockin (DVD)
