= Madden NFL 2005 =

2004 video game

- Australian PlayStation 2 cover art with Ray Lewis
- Developers: EA Tiburon (Note: Ported to Windows by Budcat Creations); Exient Entertainment (GBA, DS); Mobile Digital Media (Mobile, Zodiac)
- Publisher: EA Sports
- Series: Madden NFL
- Platforms: GameCube; PlayStation 2; Xbox; PlayStation; Windows; Game Boy Advance; Nintendo DS; Mobile phone (Note: Available for Palm OS and Windows Mobile); Tapwave Zodiac
- Release: August 10, 2004: Game Boy Advance, GameCube, PS2, Xbox; NA: August 10, 2004; AU: September 10, 2004 (GC, PS2, Xbox); EU: September 17, 2004 (GC, PS2, Xbox) PlayStation; NA: September 7, 2004 Windows; NA: September 14, 2004; AU: September 15, 2004; EU: October 15, 2004 Mobile phone; NA: October 2004 Zodiac; NA: November 2004
- Genre: Sports
- Modes: Single-player, multiplayer

Madden NFL 2005 is an American football simulation video game based on the NFL that was developed by EA Tiburon, along with Exient Entertainment and Budcat Creations, and published by EA Sports. The fifteenth installment of the Madden NFL series, it features former Baltimore Ravens linebacker Ray Lewis on the cover. Al Michaels and John Madden return as game commentators. Released on August 10, 2004, the game is the first Madden game to feature Xbox Live. While Xbox Live for original Xbox games was terminated in 2010, Madden NFL 2005 is now playable online using replacement online servers for the Xbox called Insignia.

== Development ==
The game had around 13,000 game testers.

== Soundtrack ==
Madden NFL 2005's soundtrack included the song "American Idiot" by Green Day before its release as a single.

== Reception ==
Reception

Aggregate scores
| Aggregator | Score | | | | | |
| Aggregator | DS | GBA | GameCube | PC | PS2 | Xbox |
|---|---|---|---|---|---|---|
| GameRankings | 69.07% | 80% | 90% | 83.73% | 90.33% | 89.50% |
| Metacritic | 68/100 | 79/100 | 90/100 | 85/100 | 91/100 | 91/100 |

Review scores
| Publication | Score | | | | | |
| Publication | DS | GBA | GameCube | PC | PS2 | Xbox |
|---|---|---|---|---|---|---|
| Electronic Gaming Monthly | 7.17/10 | N/A | 9.17/10 | N/A | 9.17/10 | 9.17/10 |
| Eurogamer | N/A | N/A | N/A | N/A | N/A | 8/10 |
| Game Informer | 6.5/10 | 7/10 | 8.75/10 | N/A | 8.75/10 | 8.75/10 |
| GamePro | 4/5 | N/A | 4.5/5 | N/A | 5/5 | 5/5 |
| GameRevolution | C | N/A | B+ | N/A | A− | A− |
| GameSpot | 7.2/10 | 8.1/10 | 8.8/10 | 8.8/10 | 9/10 | 9/10 |
| GameSpy | N/A | N/A | 4.5/5 | N/A | 5/5 | 5/5 |
| GameZone | N/A | 8.5/10 | 8.8/10 | N/A | 9.3/10 (C. Ed.) 9.1/10 | 9.5/10 |
| IGN | 7/10 | 8/10 | 9.4/10 | 9.5/10 | 9.5/10 | 9.5/10 |
| Nintendo Power | 3.8/5 | 3.3/5 | 4.5/5 | N/A | N/A | N/A |
| Official U.S. PlayStation Magazine | N/A | N/A | N/A | N/A | 4.5/5 | N/A |
| Official Xbox Magazine (US) | N/A | N/A | N/A | N/A | N/A | 9.1/10 |
| PC Gamer (US) | N/A | N/A | N/A | 84% | N/A | N/A |

Depending on the platform, the game was met with mixed reviews to universal acclaim according to Metacritic, while frequently being compared to its competitor ESPN NFL 2K5. The game has also been heavily criticized for its questionable soundtrack, which was a common recurrence throughout the series. GameRankings and Metacritic gave it a score of 90.33% and 91 out of 100 for the PlayStation 2 version; 90% and 90 out of 100 for the GameCube version; 89.50% and 91 out of 100 for the Xbox version; 83.73% and 85 out of 100 for the PC version; 80% and 79 out of 100 for the Game Boy Advance version; and 69.07% and 68 out of 100 for the DS version. GameSpot named it the best Xbox and PlayStation 2 game of August 2004. IGN called the PS2 version the 98th best PlayStation 2 game due to its AI quality and graphics.

Many NFL players voiced their opinions on their in-game representation. Both David Bowens and Larry Chester thought their characters should be better to be more faithful to reality.

During the 8th Annual Interactive Achievement Awards, the Academy of Interactive Arts & Sciences nominated Madden NFL 2005 for "Console Sports Simulation Game of the Year", which was ultimately awarded to ESPN NFL 2K5.

ESPN NFL 2K5 was the first in the 2K series priced at $19.99 the day it shipped, much lower than market leader Madden NFL at $49.99. This greatly reduced Madden sales that year; one EA Sports developer recalled that "[i]t scared the hell out of us". EA reduced Madden NFL 2005's price to $29.95. In December 2004 EA Sports acquired an exclusive rights agreement with the NFL and NFLPA to be the sole creator of NFL video games a deal that has since been renewed multiple times and is still active as of the 2024 NFL season.

The game sold more than 4 million copies the year it was released.
