= List of songs recorded by Iron Maiden =

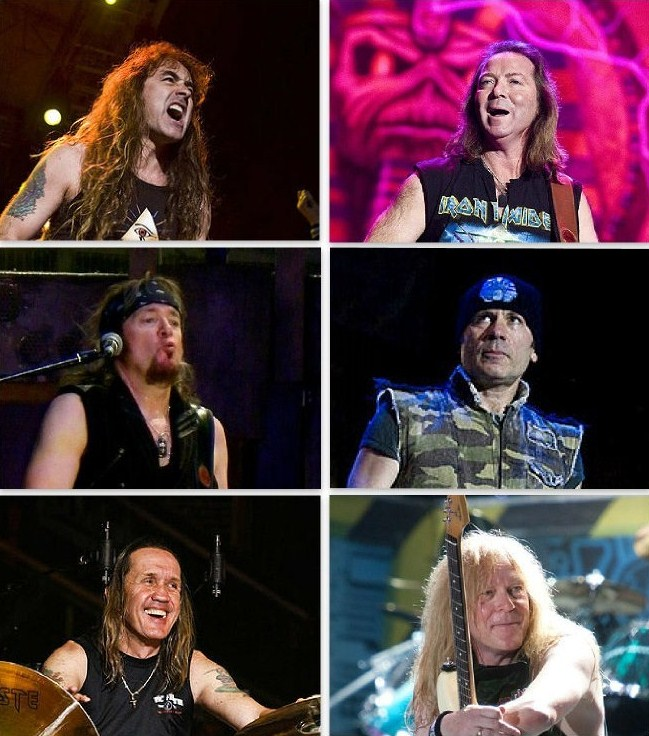
The current lineup of Iron Maiden comprises Steve Harris, Dave Murray, Adrian Smith, Bruce Dickinson, Nicko McBrain, and Janick Gers.

Iron Maiden are an English heavy metal band formed by bassist Steve Harris in 1975. The band's first album, 1980's Iron Maiden, was written primarily by Harris, with vocalist Paul Di'Anno co-writing two tracks and guitarist Dave Murray contributing "Charlotte the Harlot". The 1981 follow-up, Killers, was written almost entirely by the bassist, with frontman Di'Anno contributing only to the title track, "Killers" (the North American bonus track "Twilight Zone" was credited to Harris and Murray). Bruce Dickinson replaced Di'Anno after the release of Killers. In 1982 the band released The Number of the Beast, which featured three songs co-written by Dickinson (although he could not receive writing credits due to contractual issues with his former band Samson), three songs co-written by guitarist Adrian Smith, and one co-written by drummer Clive Burr (a B-side also co written by Burr was included in a 1990s re-release of the album). The Number of the Beast also spawned Iron Maiden's first UK singles chart top ten in the form of "Run to the Hills", which charted at number seven on its release. It was not until 1983's Piece of Mind that the songwriting process became a more varied and collaborative approach, with just four of its nine tracks being credited solely to Harris, two to Dickinson and Smith, one to Harris and Murray, one to Dickinson alone, and one to Harris, Dickinson, and Smith. The Dickinson and Smith-penned "Flight of Icarus" was the first Iron Maiden single to chart in the United States, reaching number eight on the Billboard Mainstream Rock chart.

Powerslave followed in 1984, which featured one of Iron Maiden's longest songs to date in the form of "Rime of the Ancient Mariner", written by Steve Harris and running for almost 14 minutes. Somewhere in Time was notable for having both its singles written by someone other than Steve Harris, in this case Adrian Smith, who wrote three of the songs on the album. Seventh Son of a Seventh Son featured songwriting from a combination of Harris, Dickinson, Smith, and Murray, before Smith left the group during the recording of its follow-up in 1990 having contributed to one song, "Hooks in You"; the resulting album, No Prayer for the Dying, was the first to feature guitarist Janick Gers, although he did not write any material for the record. It was also the first to spawn a UK number-one single – Bruce Dickinson's "Bring Your Daughter... to the Slaughter". Gers contributed to his second album with Iron Maiden, 1992's Fear of the Dark, co-writing three tracks with Dickinson, who would leave after the album's release, and two with Harris, who also produced for the first time.

In 1995, the band released The X Factor, their first album since 1981's Killers without Bruce Dickinson on vocals. Blaze Bayley replaced the frontman, and received songwriting credits for five of the album's eleven tracks, all of which were alongside Harris, Gers, or both. The band's first compilation album, Best of the Beast, was released in 1996, which featured a new song and single in the form of "Virus", credited to Harris, Bayley, Murray, and Gers. Bayley recorded a second album with Iron Maiden, Virtual XI, on which he only contributed songwriting for three songs, the rest being written almost entirely by Harris.

Both Dickinson and Smith returned to the band for the recording of Brave New World, the first Iron Maiden album produced by Kevin Shirley (alongside Harris), which was released in 2000 and spawned two UK top-20 singles in the form of "The Wicker Man" and "Out of the Silent Planet". Another largely collaborative album, only one song ("Blood Brothers") was written by Harris alone. The 2003 follow-up, Dance of Death, was even more commercially successful than Brave New World, and also featured the first track in the band's history to be written with long-term drummer Nicko McBrain, "New Frontier". A Matter of Life and Death, the band's first release to chart in the top ten of the US Billboard 200 albums chart, was released in 2006 and was largely written by Harris, Dickinson, and Smith, with Gers and Murray also contributing to a couple of tracks. The Final Frontier, released in 2010, was their first album since Fear of the Dark to top the UK Albums Chart and was another collaborative effort from the band, with Harris, Dickinson, and Smith again leading the songwriting. The Final Frontier also led to the band's first Grammy Award win, as single "El Dorado" won the award for Best Metal Performance at the 2011 ceremony. Their 2015 studio album, The Book of Souls, is their longest to date, at 92 minutes, and their first double album. It features "Empire of the Clouds", written by Dickinson, which surpasses "Rime of the Ancient Mariner" as the band's longest song, with a running time of 18 minutes.

Since their formation, Iron Maiden have also released numerous additional songs as B-sides to their singles, including original songs and cover versions. A collection of these B-sides were compiled and released in the form of Best of the 'B' Sides, one of three albums included in the Eddie's Archive box set released in 2002. Included on this album was a range of B-sides released since the band's formation, including originals "Burning Ambition" (Harris), "Black Bart Blues" (Harris, Dickinson), and "Justice of the Peace" (Harris, Murray), and covers "Cross-Eyed Mary" (Jethro Tull), "Communication Breakdown" (Led Zeppelin), and "My Generation" (The Who). The album also contained 1988 re-recordings of Iron Maiden tracks "Prowler" and "Charlotte the Harlot", released as B-sides to "The Evil That Men Do", and a 1999 live version of "Wasted Years" from the 1986 album Somewhere in Time, released as a B-side to "Out of the Silent Planet" in 2000. Iron Maiden also contributed a cover of Deep Purple's "Space Truckin'" to the 2012 tribute album Re-Machined: A Tribute to Deep Purple's Machine Head.

As of 2024, the band has recorded in total 197 songs, comprising 177 original compositions and 20 cover versions.

== Songs ==
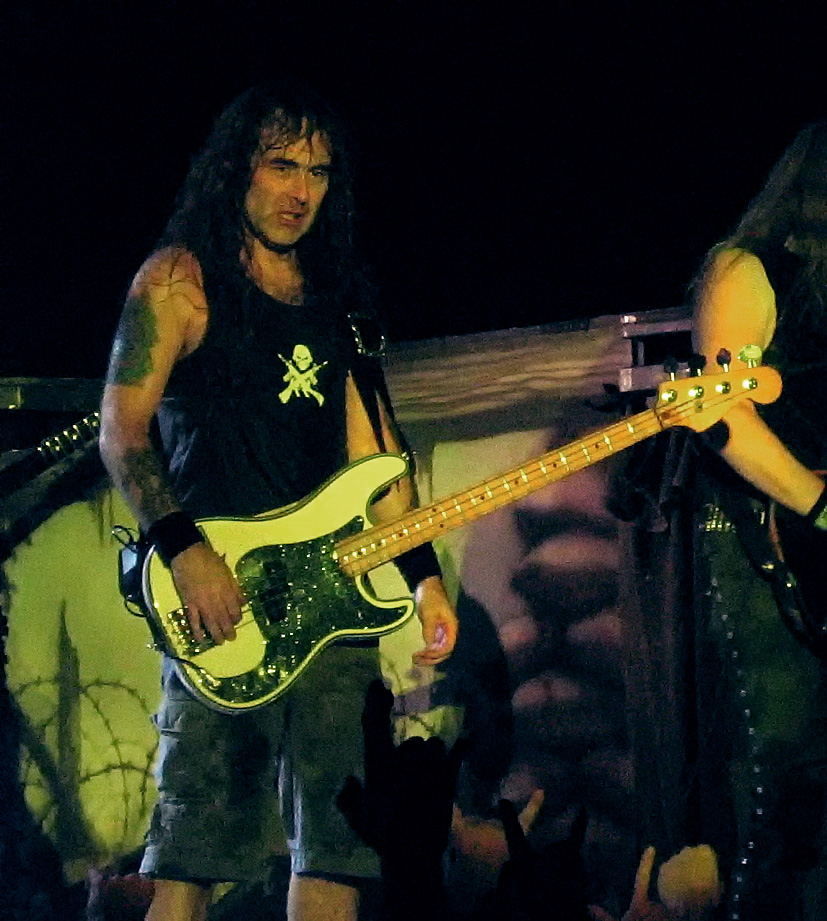
Since their inception, the majority of the band's songwriting has been led by founding member Steve Harris.

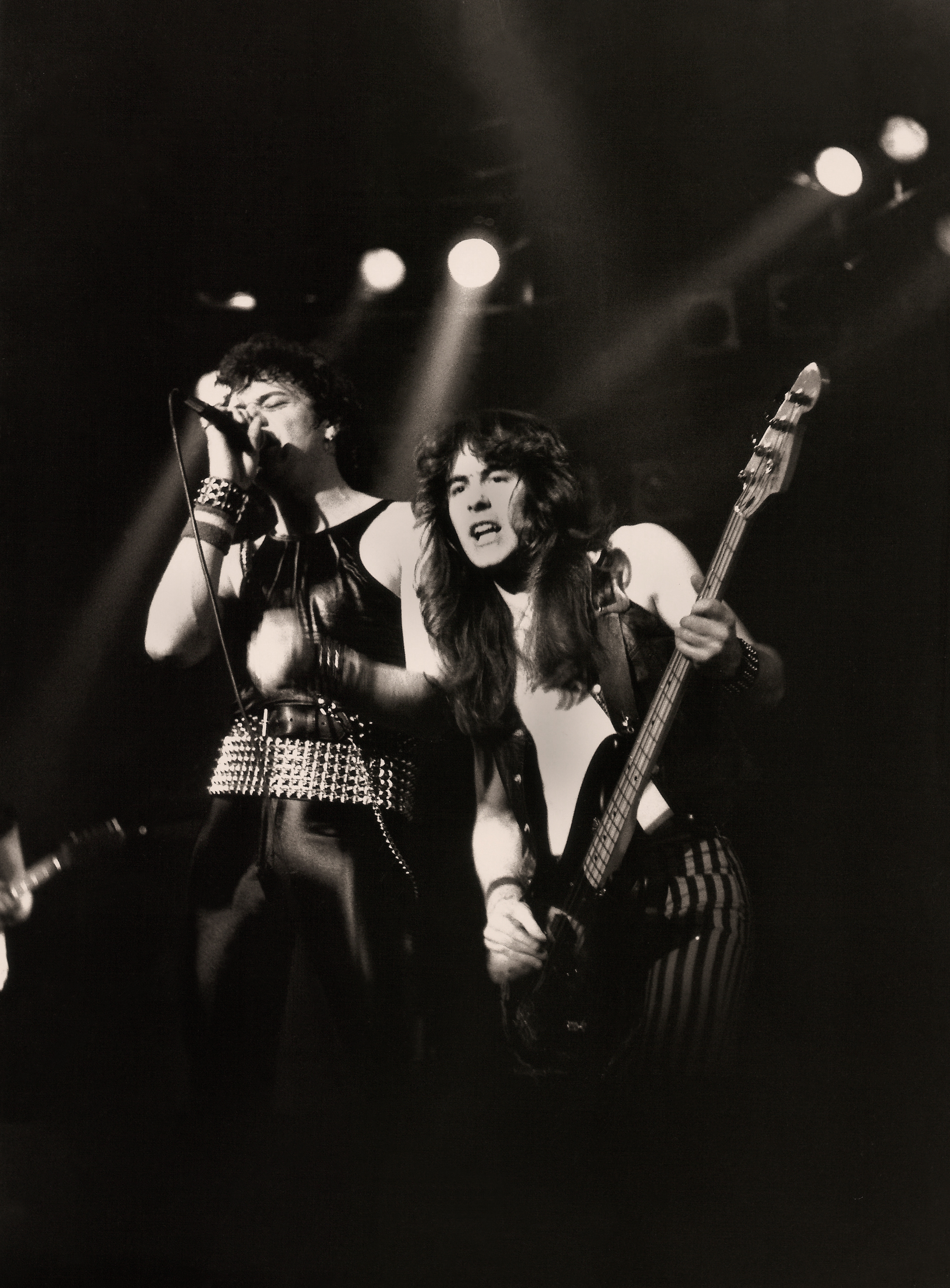
Harris and original vocalist Paul Di'Anno wrote three tracks together for the band's first two albums: "Remember Tomorrow", "Running Free", and "Killers".

Since joining the band in 1981, vocalist Bruce Dickinson has contributed consistently to Iron Maiden's songwriting, including their first number-one single, "Bring Your Daughter... to the Slaughter".

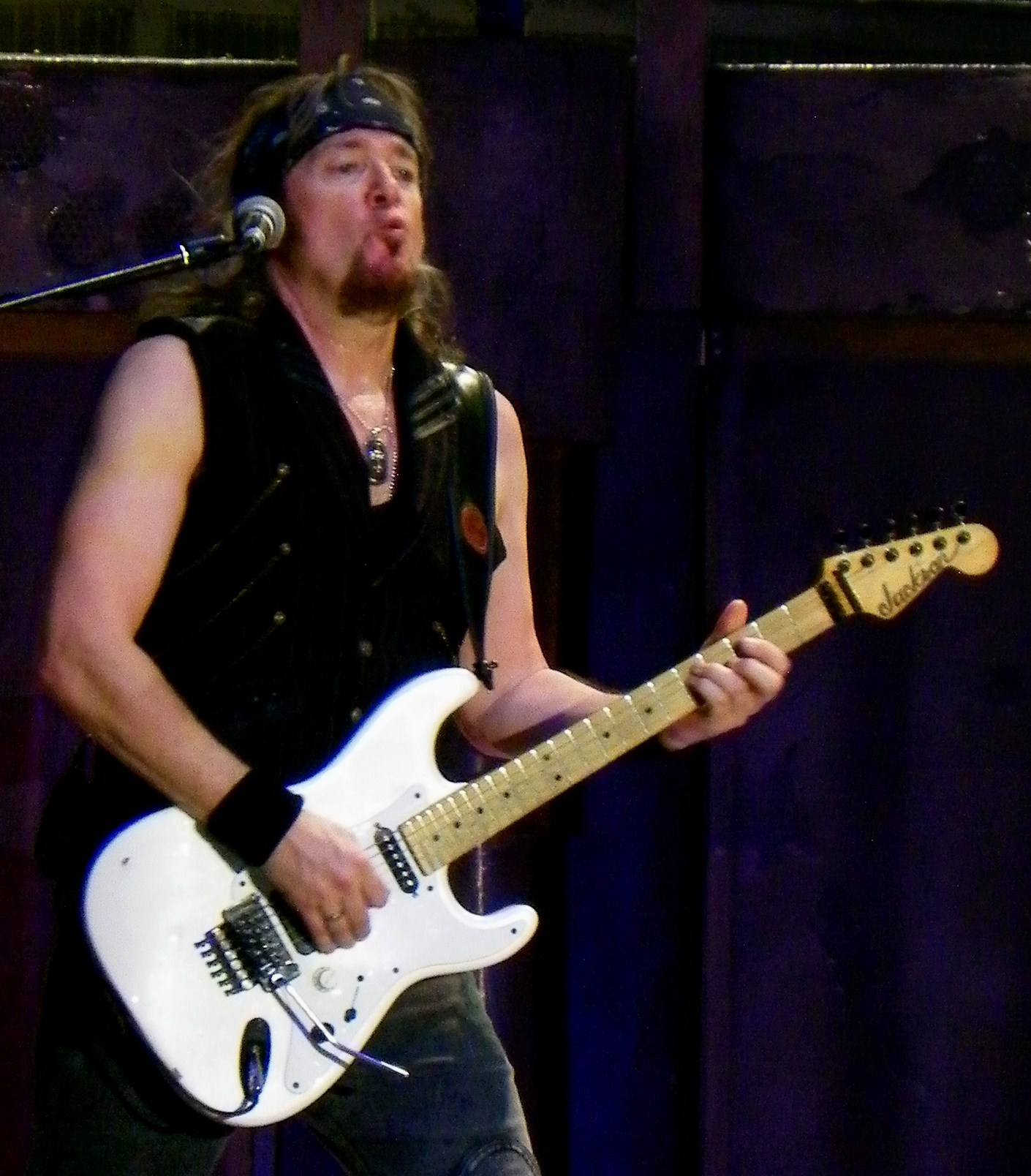
Guitarist Adrian Smith has also written numerous songs for the band since joining in 1980, often working with Dickinson and/or Harris on compositions.

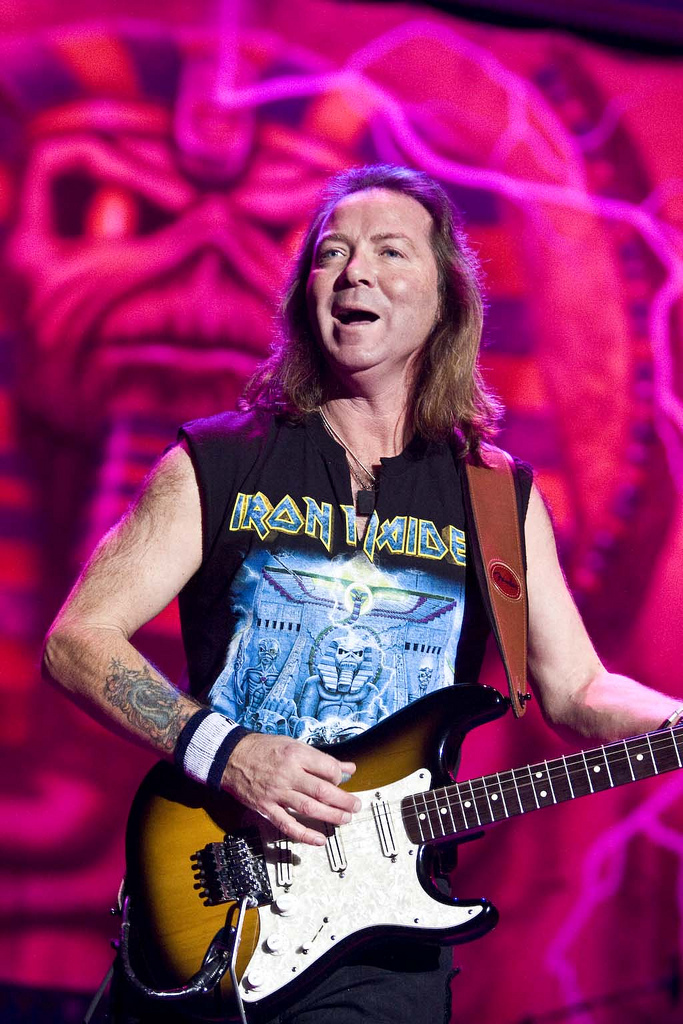
As the second longest-serving member of the band, Dave Murray has contributed songwriting to almost every Iron Maiden album since their inception.

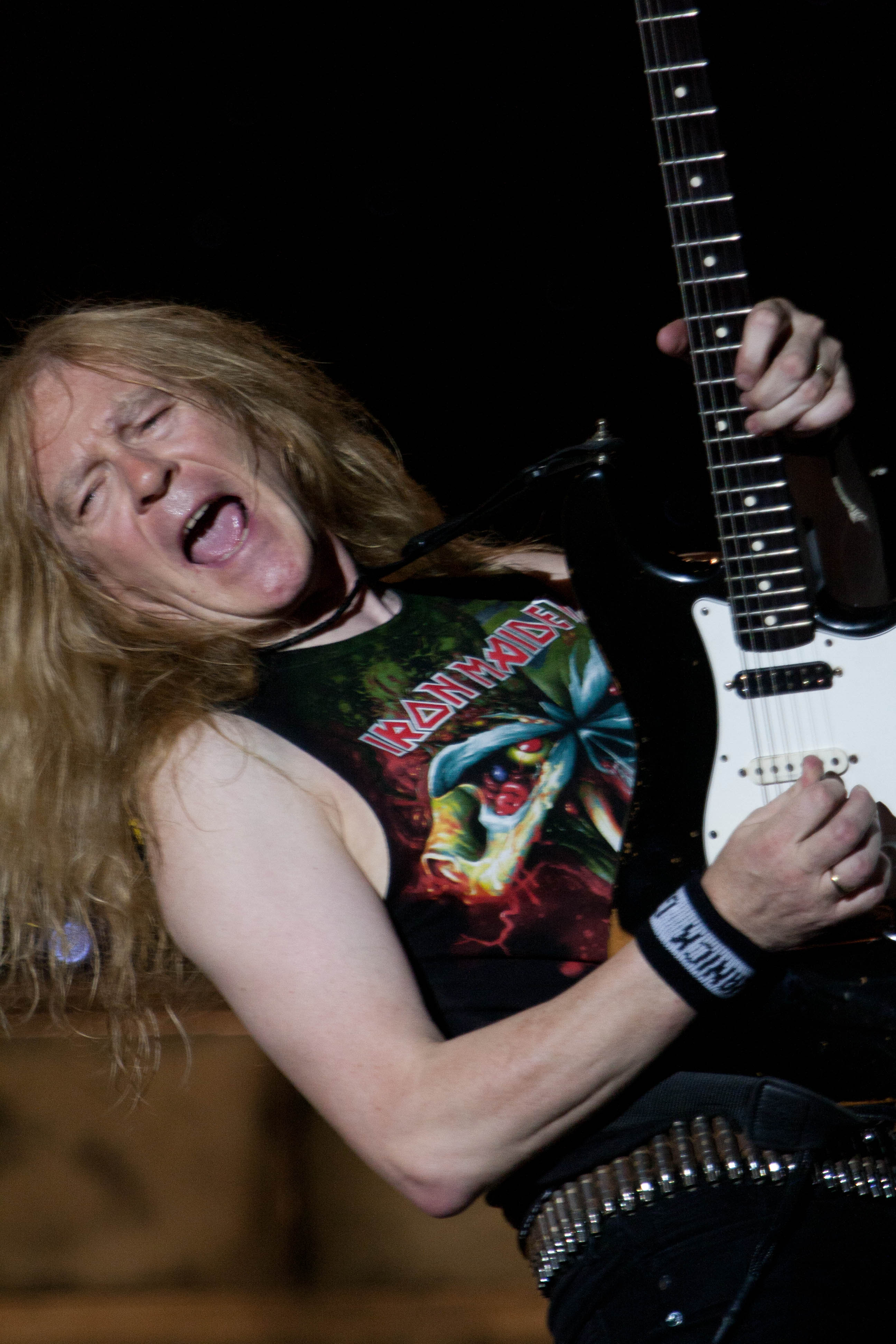
Janick Gers joined Iron Maiden in 1990, and has since co-written a number of songs for the band, mainly alongside Harris.

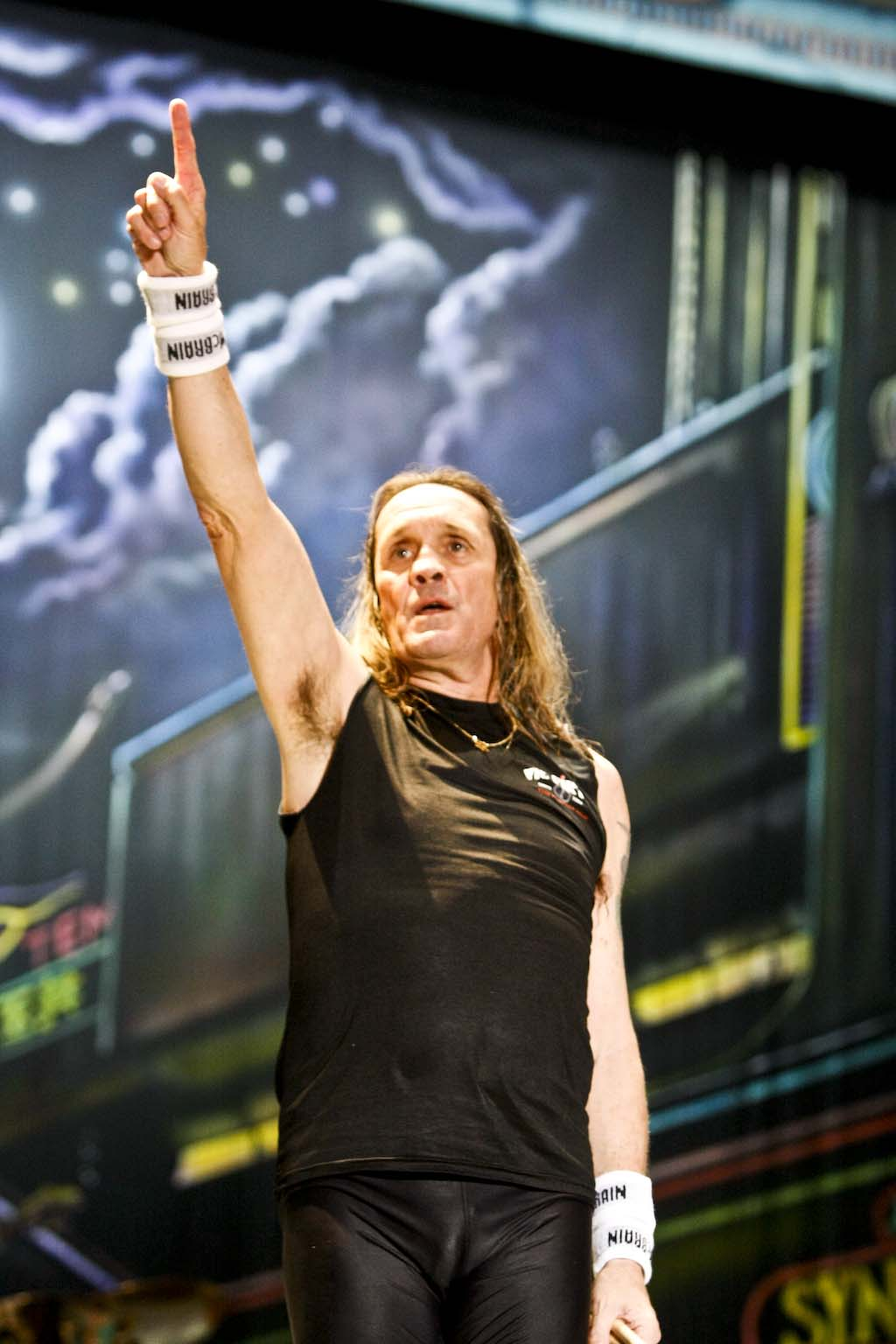
Despite being a member of the band since 1982, it took until 2003 for drummer Nicko McBrain to write a song for Iron Maiden, namely "New Frontier" for Dance of Death.

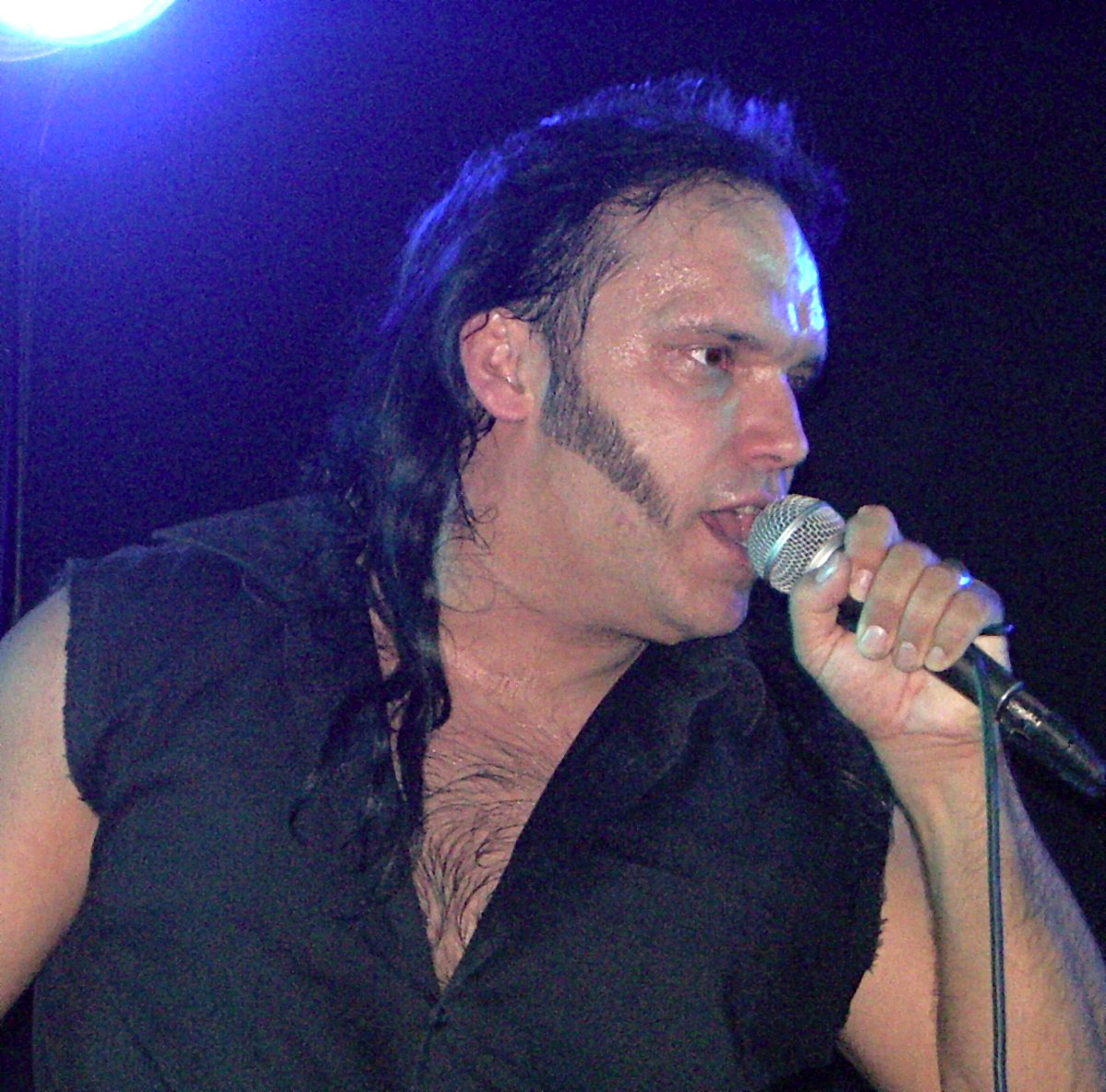
During his brief tenure with the band, vocalist Blaze Bayley helped write eight songs on the two Iron Maiden albums on which he performed, The X Factor and Virtual XI, as well as "Virus".

Key
†	Indicates song released as a single
‡	Indicates song written solely by Steve Harris

Song	Songwriter(s)	Release	Year	Ref.
"2 A.M."	Blaze Bayley; Janick Gers; Steve Harris	The X Factor	1995	
"2 Minutes to Midnight" †	Bruce Dickinson; Adrian Smith	Powerslave	1984	
"22 Acacia Avenue"	Steve Harris; Adrian Smith	The Number of the Beast	1982	
"Aces High" †	Steve Harris ‡	Powerslave	1984	
"Afraid to Shoot Strangers"	Steve Harris ‡	Fear of the Dark	1992	
"The Aftermath"	Steve Harris; Blaze Bayley; Janick Gers	The X Factor	1995	
"Age of Innocence"	Dave Murray; Steve Harris	Dance of Death	2003	
"The Alchemist"	Janick Gers; Steve Harris; Bruce Dickinson	The Final Frontier	2010	
"Alexander the Great"	Steve Harris ‡	Somewhere in Time	1986	
"All in Your Mind" (Note: Stray cover.)	Del Bromham	"Holy Smoke"	1990	
"The Angel and the Gambler" †	Steve Harris ‡	Virtual XI	1998	
"Another Life"	Steve Harris ‡	Killers	1981	
"The Apparition"	Steve Harris; Janick Gers	Fear of the Dark	1992	
"The Assassin"	Steve Harris ‡	No Prayer for the Dying	1990	
"Back in the Village"	Bruce Dickinson; Adrian Smith	Powerslave	1984	
"Bayswater Ain't a Bad Place to Be"	Bruce Dickinson; Janick Gers	"Be Quick or Be Dead"	1992	
"Be Quick or Be Dead" †	Bruce Dickinson; Janick Gers	Fear of the Dark	1992	
"Black Bart Blues"	Steve Harris; Bruce Dickinson	"Can I Play with Madness"	1988	
"Blood Brothers"	Steve Harris ‡	Brave New World	2000	
"Blood on the World's Hands"	Steve Harris ‡	The X Factor	1995	
"The Book of Souls"	Janick Gers; Steve Harris	The Book of Souls	2015	
"Brave New World"	Dave Murray; Steve Harris; Bruce Dickinson	Brave New World	2000	
"Brighter Than a Thousand Suns"	Adrian Smith; Steve Harris; Bruce Dickinson	A Matter of Life and Death	2006	
"Bring Your Daughter... to the Slaughter" †	Bruce Dickinson	No Prayer for the Dying	1990	
"Burning Ambition"	Steve Harris ‡	"Running Free"	1980	
"Can I Play with Madness" †	Steve Harris; Bruce Dickinson; Adrian Smith	Seventh Son of a Seventh Son	1988	
"Caught Somewhere in Time"	Steve Harris ‡	Somewhere in Time	1986	
"Chains of Misery"	Bruce Dickinson; Dave Murray	Fear of the Dark	1992	
"Charlotte the Harlot"	Dave Murray	Iron Maiden	1980	
"Childhood's End"	Steve Harris ‡	Fear of the Dark	1992	
"Children of the Damned"	Steve Harris ‡ (Note: Co-written by Bruce Dickinson, although unable to receive a writing credit for contractual reasons.)	The Number of the Beast	1982	
"The Clairvoyant" †	Steve Harris ‡	Seventh Son of a Seventh Son	1988	
"The Clansman"	Steve Harris ‡	Virtual XI	1998	
"Coming Home"	Adrian Smith; Steve Harris; Bruce Dickinson	The Final Frontier	2010	
"Communication Breakdown" (Note: Led Zeppelin cover.)	Jimmy Page; John Paul Jones; John Bonham	"Bring Your Daughter... to the Slaughter"	1990	
"Como Estais Amigos"	Janick Gers; Blaze Bayley	Virtual XI	1998	
"Cross-Eyed Mary" (Note: Jethro Tull cover.)	Ian Anderson	"The Trooper"	1983	
"Dance of Death"	Janick Gers; Steve Harris	Dance of Death	2003	
"Darkest Hour"	Adrian Smith; Bruce Dickinson	Senjutsu	2021	
"Days of Future Past"	Adrian Smith; Bruce Dickinson	Senjutsu	2021	
"Death of the Celts"	Steve Harris ‡	Senjutsu	2021	
"Death or Glory"	Adrian Smith; Bruce Dickinson	The Book of Souls	2015	
"Deja-Vu"	Steve Harris; Dave Murray	Somewhere in Time	1986	
"Die with Your Boots On"	Steve Harris; Bruce Dickinson; Adrian Smith	Piece of Mind	1983	
"Different World" †	Adrian Smith; Steve Harris	A Matter of Life and Death	2006	
"Doctor Doctor" (Note: UFO cover.)	Michael Schenker; Phil Mogg	"Lord of the Flies"	1996	
"Don't Look to the Eyes of a Stranger"	Steve Harris ‡	Virtual XI	1998	
"Dream of Mirrors"	Janick Gers; Steve Harris	Brave New World	2000	
"Drifter"	Steve Harris ‡	Killers	1981	
"The Duellists"	Steve Harris ‡	Powerslave	1984	
"The Edge of Darkness"	Steve Harris; Blaze Bayley; Janick Gers	The X Factor	1995	
"The Educated Fool"	Steve Harris ‡	Virtual XI	1998	
"El Dorado" †	Adrian Smith; Steve Harris; Bruce Dickinson	The Final Frontier	2010	
"Empire of the Clouds"	Bruce Dickinson	The Book of Souls	2015	
"The Evil That Men Do" †	Steve Harris; Bruce Dickinson; Adrian Smith	Seventh Son of a Seventh Son	1988	
"Face in the Sand"	Adrian Smith; Steve Harris; Bruce Dickinson	Dance of Death	2003	
"The Fallen Angel"	Adrian Smith; Steve Harris	Brave New World	2000	
"Fates Warning"	Dave Murray; Steve Harris	No Prayer for the Dying	1990	
"Fear Is the Key"	Bruce Dickinson; Janick Gers	Fear of the Dark	1992	
"Fear of the Dark" †	Steve Harris ‡	Fear of the Dark	1992	
"Flash of the Blade"	Bruce Dickinson	Powerslave	1984	
"Flight of Icarus" †	Bruce Dickinson; Adrian Smith	Piece of Mind	1983	
"For the Greater Good of God"	Steve Harris ‡	A Matter of Life and Death	2006	
"Fortunes of War"	Steve Harris ‡	The X Factor	1995	
"From Here to Eternity" †	Steve Harris ‡	Fear of the Dark	1992	
"The Fugitive"	Steve Harris ‡	Fear of the Dark	1992	
"Futureal" †	Steve Harris; Blaze Bayley	Virtual XI	1998	
"Gangland"	Adrian Smith; Clive Burr	The Number of the Beast	1982	
"Gates of Tomorrow"	Janick Gers; Steve Harris; Bruce Dickinson	Dance of Death	2003	
"Genghis Khan"	Steve Harris ‡	Killers	1981	
"Ghost of the Navigator"	Janick Gers; Bruce Dickinson; Steve Harris	Brave New World	2000	
"The Great Unknown"	Adrian Smith; Steve Harris	The Book of Souls	2015	
"Hallowed Be Thy Name" †	Steve Harris ‡	The Number of the Beast	1982	
"Heaven Can Wait"	Steve Harris ‡	Somewhere in Time	1986	
"Hell on Earth"	Steve Harris ‡	Senjutsu	2021	
"Hocus Pocus" (Note: Focus cover.)	Thijs van Leer; Jan Akkerman	"Different World"	2006	
"Holy Smoke" †	Steve Harris; Bruce Dickinson	No Prayer for the Dying	1990	
"Hooks in You"	Bruce Dickinson; Adrian Smith	No Prayer for the Dying	1990	
"I Can't See My Feelings" (Note: Budgie cover.)	Burke Shelley; Tony Bourge	"From Here to Eternity"	1992	
"The Ides of March"	Steve Harris ‡	Killers	1981	
"If Eternity Should Fail"	Bruce Dickinson	The Book of Souls	2015	
"I Live My Way"	Steve Harris; Blaze Bayley; Janick Gers	"Man on the Edge"	1995	
"I'm a Mover" (Note: Free cover.)	Paul Rodgers; Andy Fraser	"Bring Your Daughter... to the Slaughter"	1990	
"I've Got the Fire" (Note: Montrose cover.)	Ronnie Montrose	"Flight of Icarus"	1983	
"Infinite Dreams" †	Steve Harris ‡	Seventh Son of a Seventh Son	1988	
"Innocent Exile"	Steve Harris ‡	Killers	1981	
"Invaders"	Steve Harris ‡	The Number of the Beast	1982	
"Invasion"	Steve Harris ‡	"Women in Uniform"	1980	
"Iron Maiden"	Steve Harris ‡	Iron Maiden	1980	
"Isle of Avalon"	Adrian Smith; Steve Harris	The Final Frontier	2010	
"Journeyman"	Adrian Smith; Steve Harris; Bruce Dickinson	Dance of Death	2003	
"Juanita" (Note: Marshall Fury cover.)	Steve Barnacle; Derek O'Neil	"Stranger in a Strange Land"	1986	
"Judas Be My Guide"	Bruce Dickinson; Dave Murray	Fear of the Dark	1992	
"Judgement Day"	Blaze Bayley; Janick Gers	"Man on the Edge"	1995	
"Judgement of Heaven"	Steve Harris ‡	The X Factor	1995	
"Justice of the Peace"	Dave Murray; Steve Harris	"Man on the Edge"	1995	
"Kill Me Ce Soir" (Note: Golden Earring cover.)	George Kooymans; Barry Hay; John Fenton	"Holy Smoke"	1990	
"Killers"	Steve Harris; Paul Di'Anno	Killers	1981	
"King of Twilight" (Note: Nektar cover.)	Roye Albrighton; Derek Moore; Ron Howden; Allan Freeman; Mick Brockett	"Aces High"	1984	
"The Legacy"	Janick Gers; Steve Harris	A Matter of Life and Death	2006	
"Lightning Strikes Twice"	Dave Murray; Steve Harris	Virtual XI	1998	
"The Loneliness of the Long Distance Runner"	Steve Harris ‡	Somewhere in Time	1986	
"The Longest Day"	Adrian Smith; Steve Harris; Bruce Dickinson	A Matter of Life and Death	2006	
"Look for the Truth"	Blaze Bayley; Janick Gers; Steve Harris	The X Factor	1995	
"Lord of Light"	Adrian Smith; Steve Harris; Bruce Dickinson	A Matter of Life and Death	2006	
"Lord of the Flies" †	Steve Harris; Janick Gers	The X Factor	1995	
"Losfer Words (Big 'Orra)"	Steve Harris ‡	Powerslave	1984	
"Lost in a Lost World"	Steve Harris ‡	Senjutsu	2021	
"The Man of Sorrows"	Dave Murray; Steve Harris	The Book of Souls	2015	
"Man on the Edge" †	Blaze Bayley; Janick Gers	The X Factor	1995	
"The Man Who Would Be King"	Dave Murray; Steve Harris	The Final Frontier	2010	
"Massacre" (Note: Thin Lizzy cover.)	Phil Lynott; Scott Gorham; Brian Downey	"Can I Play with Madness"	1988	
"The Mercenary"	Janick Gers; Steve Harris	Brave New World	2000	
"Montségur"	Janick Gers; Steve Harris; Bruce Dickinson	Dance of Death	2003	
"Moonchild"	Bruce Dickinson; Adrian Smith	Seventh Son of a Seventh Son	1988	
"More Tea Vicar"	Bruce Dickinson; Janick Gers; Steve Harris; Nicko McBrain; Dave Murray; Adrian Smith	"Rainmaker"	2003	
"Mother of Mercy"	Adrian Smith; Steve Harris	The Final Frontier	2010	
"Mother Russia"	Steve Harris ‡	No Prayer for the Dying	1990	
"Murders in the Rue Morgue"	Steve Harris ‡	Killers	1981	
"My Generation" (Note: The Who cover.)	Pete Townshend	"Lord of the Flies"	1996	
"New Frontier"	Nicko McBrain; Adrian Smith; Bruce Dickinson	Dance of Death	2003	
"No More Lies"	Steve Harris ‡	Dance of Death	2003	
"No Prayer for the Dying"	Steve Harris ‡	No Prayer for the Dying	1990	
"Nodding Donkey Blues"	Steve Harris; Bruce Dickinson; Dave Murray; Nicko McBrain; Janick Gers	"Be Quick or Be Dead"	1992	
"The Nomad"	Dave Murray; Steve Harris	Brave New World	2000	
"The Number of the Beast" †	Steve Harris ‡	The Number of the Beast	1982	
"Only the Good Die Young"	Steve Harris; Bruce Dickinson	Seventh Son of a Seventh Son	1988	
"Out of the Shadows"	Bruce Dickinson; Steve Harris	A Matter of Life and Death	2006	
"Out of the Silent Planet" †	Janick Gers; Bruce Dickinson; Steve Harris	Brave New World	2000	
"The Parchment"	Steve Harris ‡	Senjutsu	2021	
"Paschendale"	Adrian Smith; Steve Harris	Dance of Death	2003	
"Pass the Jam"	Steve Harris; Bruce Dickinson; Adrian Smith; Janick Gers; Dave Murray; Nicko McBrain	"Dance of Death"	2003	
"Phantom of the Opera"	Steve Harris ‡	Iron Maiden	1980	
"The Pilgrim"	Janick Gers; Steve Harris	A Matter of Life and Death	2006	
"Powerslave"	Bruce Dickinson	Powerslave	1984	
"The Prisoner"	Adrian Smith; Steve Harris	The Number of the Beast	1982	
"Prodigal Son"	Steve Harris ‡	Killers	1981	
"The Prophecy"	Steve Harris; Dave Murray	Seventh Son of a Seventh Son	1988	
"Prowler"	Steve Harris ‡	Iron Maiden	1980	
"Public Enema Number One"	Dave Murray; Bruce Dickinson	No Prayer for the Dying	1990	
"Purgatory" †	Steve Harris ‡	Killers	1981	
"Quest for Fire"	Steve Harris ‡	Piece of Mind	1983	
"Rainbow's Gold" (Note: Beckett cover.)	Terry Slesser; Kenny Mountain	"2 Minutes to Midnight"	1984	
"Rainmaker" †	Dave Murray; Steve Harris; Bruce Dickinson	Dance of Death	2003	
"Reach Out" (Note: Originally performed by side-project The Entire Population of Hackney.)	Dave Colwell	"Wasted Years"	1986	
"The Red and the Black"	Steve Harris ‡	The Book of Souls	2015	
"The Reincarnation of Benjamin Breeg" †	Dave Murray; Steve Harris	A Matter of Life and Death	2006	
"Remember Tomorrow"	Steve Harris; Paul Di'Anno	Iron Maiden	1980	
"Revelations"	Bruce Dickinson	Piece of Mind	1983	
"Rime of the Ancient Mariner"	Steve Harris ‡	Powerslave	1984	
"Roll Over Vic Vella" (Note: Chuck Berry cover with original lyrics by Steve Harris.)	Chuck Berry	"From Here to Eternity"	1992	
"Run Silent Run Deep"	Steve Harris; Bruce Dickinson	No Prayer for the Dying	1990	
"Run to the Hills" †	Steve Harris ‡	The Number of the Beast	1982	
"Running Free" †	Steve Harris; Paul Di'Anno	Iron Maiden	1980	
"Sanctuary" †	Iron Maiden (Note: Song's rights purchased from original writer, guitarist Rob Angelo. Credited to Steve Harris, Dave Murray and Paul Di'Anno on later releases.)	Iron Maiden	1980	
"Satellite 15... The Final Frontier"	Adrian Smith; Steve Harris	The Final Frontier	2010	
"Sea of Madness"	Adrian Smith	Somewhere in Time	1986	
"Senjutsu"	Adrian Smith; Steve Harris	Senjutsu	2021	
"Seventh Son of a Seventh Son"	Steve Harris ‡	Seventh Son of a Seventh Son	1988	
"Shadows of the Valley"	Janick Gers; Steve Harris	The Book of Souls	2015	
"Sheriff of Huddersfield"	Iron Maiden (Note: Bruce Dickinson, Dave Murray, Adrian Smith, Steve Harris, Nicko McBrain.)	"Wasted Years"	1986	
"Sign of the Cross"	Steve Harris ‡	The X Factor	1995	
"Space Station #5" (Note: Montrose cover.)	Ronnie Montrose; Sammy Hagar	"Be Quick or Be Dead"	1992	
"Space Truckin' (Note: Deep Purple cover.)	Ritchie Blackmore; Ian Gillan; Roger Glover; Jon Lord; Ian Paice	Re-Machined: A Tribute to Deep Purple's Machine Head	2012	
"Speed of Light" †	Adrian Smith; Bruce Dickinson	The Book of Souls	2015	
"Starblind"	Adrian Smith; Steve Harris; Bruce Dickinson	The Final Frontier	2010	
"Still Life"	Steve Harris; Dave Murray	Piece of Mind	1983	
"Strange World"	Steve Harris ‡	Iron Maiden	1980	
"Stranger in a Strange Land" †	Adrian Smith	Somewhere in Time	1986	
"Stratego"	Janick Gers; Steve Harris	Senjutsu	2021	
"Sun and Steel"	Bruce Dickinson; Adrian Smith	Piece of Mind	1983	
"Tailgunner"	Steve Harris; Bruce Dickinson	No Prayer for the Dying	1990	
"The Talisman"	Janick Gers; Steve Harris	The Final Frontier	2010	
"Tears of a Clown"	Adrian Smith; Steve Harris	The Book of Souls	2015	
"That Girl" (Note: Originally performed by side-project The Entire Population of Hackney, also recorded by FM.)	Merv Goldsworthy; Pete Jupp; Andy Barnett	"Stranger in a Strange Land"	1986	
"These Colours Don't Run"	Adrian Smith; Steve Harris; Bruce Dickinson	A Matter of Life and Death	2006	
"The Thin Line Between Love and Hate"	Dave Murray; Steve Harris	Brave New World	2000	
"The Time Machine"	Janick Gers; Steve Harris	Senjutsu	2021	
"To Tame a Land"	Steve Harris ‡	Piece of Mind	1983	
"Total Eclipse"	Steve Harris; Dave Murray; Clive Burr	The Number of the Beast (Note: Originally released as the B-Side to "Run to the Hills" in 1982, "Total Eclipse" was included as an official track on the 1998 Remastered edition of The Number of the Beast.)	1982	
"Transylvania"	Steve Harris ‡	Iron Maiden	1980	
"The Trooper" †	Steve Harris ‡	Piece of Mind	1983	
"Twilight Zone" †	Steve Harris; Dave Murray	Killers	1981	
"The Unbeliever"	Steve Harris; Janick Gers	The X Factor	1995	
"Virus" †	Steve Harris; Janick Gers; Dave Murray; Blaze Bayley	Best of the Beast	1996	
"Wasted Years" †	Adrian Smith	Somewhere in Time	1986	
"Wasting Love" †	Bruce Dickinson; Janick Gers	Fear of the Dark	1992	
"Weekend Warrior"	Steve Harris; Janick Gers	Fear of the Dark	1992	
"When the River Runs Deep"	Adrian Smith; Steve Harris	The Book of Souls	2015	
"When the Wild Wind Blows"	Steve Harris ‡	The Final Frontier	2010	
"When Two Worlds Collide"	Dave Murray; Blaze Bayley; Steve Harris	Virtual XI	1998	
"Where Eagles Dare"	Steve Harris ‡	Piece of Mind	1983	
"The Wicker Man" †	Adrian Smith; Steve Harris; Bruce Dickinson	Brave New World	2000	
"Wildest Dreams" †	Adrian Smith; Steve Harris	Dance of Death	2003	
"Women in Uniform" † (Note: Skyhooks cover.)	Greg Macainsh	"Women in Uniform"	1980	
"Wrathchild"	Steve Harris ‡	Killers	1981	
"The Writing on the Wall" †	Adrian Smith; Bruce Dickinson	Senjutsu	2021	

== See also ==
- Iron Maiden discography
