= Visions of the Beast =

2003 music video compilation by Iron Maiden

Video by Iron Maiden
- Released: 2 June 2003
- Genre: Heavy metal
- Length: 150:00
- Label: EMI

Iron Maiden chronology
| Rock in Rio (2002) | Visions of the Beast (2003) | The Early Days (2004) |

Visions of the Beast is a music video compilation by Iron Maiden, released on 2 June 2003 and containing every promotional video through 2001's Rock in Rio. It is basically an updated version of The First Ten Years: The Videos and From There to Eternity. It also includes never-before-seen Camp Chaos animated versions of six definitive Iron Maiden songs, interactive menus and discographies, and some special hidden extras.

== Track listing ==
Disc 1
| No. | Title | Writer(s) | Original Release | Length |
|---|---|---|---|---|
| 1. | "Women in Uniform" | Greg Macainsh | 1980 ~ Women in Uniform |
| 2. | "Wrathchild" (Live in 1980) | Steve Harris | 1981 ~ Live at the Rainbow |
| 3. | "Run to the Hills" | Harris | 1982 ~ The Number of the Beast |
| 4. | "The Number of the Beast" | Harris | 1982 ~ The Number of the Beast |
| 5. | "Flight of Icarus" | Adrian Smith, Bruce Dickinson | 1983 ~ Piece of Mind |
| 6. | "The Trooper" | Harris | 1983 ~ Piece of Mind |
| 7. | "2 Minutes to Midnight" | Smith, Dickinson | 1984 ~ Powerslave |
| 8. | "Aces High" | Harris | 1984 ~ Powerslave |
| 9. | "Wasted Years" | Smith | 1986 ~ Somewhere in Time |
| 10. | "Stranger in a Strange Land" | Smith | 1986 ~ Somewhere in Time |
| 11. | "Can I Play with Madness" | Smith, Dickinson, Harris | 1988 ~ Seventh Son of a Seventh Son |
| 12. | "The Evil That Men Do" | Smith, Dickinson, Harris | 1988 ~ Seventh Son of a Seventh Son |
| 13. | "The Clairvoyant" | Harris | 1988 ~ Seventh Son of a Seventh Son |
| 14. | "Infinite Dreams" (Live in 1988) | Harris | 1989 ~ Maiden England |
| 15. | "Holy Smoke" | Harris, Dickinson | 1990 ~ No Prayer for the Dying |
| 16. | "Tailgunner" | Harris, Dickinson | 1990 ~ No Prayer for the Dying |

Extra Videos (Disc 1)
| No. | Title | Writer(s) | Original Release | Length |
|---|---|---|---|---|
| 17. | "Aces High" (Camp Chaos Version) | Harris | 1984 ~ Powerslave |
| 18. | "The Number of the Beast" (Camp Chaos Version) | Harris | 1982 ~ The Number of the Beast |
| 19. | "Futureal" (Football Version) | Harris, Blaze Bayley | 1998 ~ Virtual XI |
| 20. | "Fear of the Dark" (Live in 2001) | Harris | 2002 ~ Rock in Rio |
| 21. | "Man on the Edge" (Fun Version) (Easter Egg) | Bayley, Janick Gers | 1995 ~ The X Factor |

Disc 2
| No. | Title | Writer(s) | Original Release | Length |
|---|---|---|---|---|
| 1. | "Bring Your Daughter... to the Slaughter" | Dickinson | 1990 ~ No Prayer for the Dying |
| 2. | "Be Quick or Be Dead" | Dickinson, Gers | 1992 ~ Fear of the Dark |
| 3. | "From Here to Eternity" | Harris | 1992 ~ Fear of the Dark |
| 4. | "Wasting Love" | Dickinson, Gers | 1992 ~ Fear of the Dark |
| 5. | "Fear of the Dark" (Live in 1992) | Harris | 1993 ~ Live at Donington |
| 6. | "Hallowed Be Thy Name" (Live in 1992) | Harris | 1993 ~ Live at Donington |
| 7. | "Man on the Edge" | Bayley, Gers | 1995 ~ The X Factor |
| 8. | "Afraid to Shoot Strangers" (Live in 1995) | Harris | Previously Unreleased |
| 9. | "Lord of the Flies" | Gers, Harris | 1995 ~ The X Factor |
| 10. | "Virus" | Harris, Gers, Dave Murray, Bayley | 1996 ~ Virus |
| 11. | "The Angel and the Gambler" | Harris | 1998 ~ Virtual XI |
| 12. | "Futureal" | Harris, Bayley | 1998 ~ Virtual XI |
| 13. | "The Wicker Man" | Smith, Harris, Dickinson | 2000 ~ Brave New World |
| 14. | "Out of the Silent Planet" | Gers, Dickinson, Harris | 2000 ~ Brave New World |
| 15. | "Brave New World" (Live in 2001) | Murray, Harris, Dickinson | 2002 ~ Rock in Rio |

Extra Videos (Disc 2)
| No. | Title | Writer(s) | Original Release | Length |
|---|---|---|---|---|
| 16. | "The Wicker Man" (Camp Chaos Version) | Smith, Harris, Dickinson | 2000 ~ Brave New World |
| 17. | "Run to the Hills" (Camp Chaos Version) | Harris | 1982 ~ The Number of the Beast |
| 18. | "Flight of Icarus" (Camp Chaos Version) | Smith, Dickinson | 1983 ~ Piece of Mind |
| 19. | "The Trooper" (Camp Chaos Version) (Easter Egg) | Harris | 1983 ~ Piece of Mind |

- Uses clips of Charlie Chaplin films.
- To access this easter egg on disc 1, play track 6 ("The Trooper") three consecutive times, to form 666... "The Number of the Beast".
- To access this easter egg on disc 2, play track 6 ("Hallowed Be Thy Name") twice, then track 4 ("Wasting Love"), in consecutive order, to form 664.

== Personnel ==
Production credits are adapted from the DVD liner notes.

Iron Maiden

- Steve Harris – bass guitar, director (Disc one; tracks 12 to 16, Disc two; tracks 1, 8 to 10), editor (Disc one; tracks 12 to 16, Disc two; tracks 1, 3, 5, 6, 8 to 10, 12 and 15), producer (Disc one; tracks 19 to 21, Disc two; tracks 5 to 13, 15)
- Dave Murray – guitar
- Paul Di'Anno – lead vocals (Disc one; tracks 1 and 2)
- Bruce Dickinson – lead vocals (Disc one; tracks 3 to 18, 19, Disc two; tracks 1 to 6, 13 to 19)
- Blaze Bayley – lead vocals (Disc one; tracks 19 and 21, Disc two: tracks 7 to 12)
- Dennis Stratton – guitar (Disc one; track 1)
- Adrian Smith – guitar (Disc one; tracks 2 to 14, 17 and 18, Disc two; tracks 13 to 19)
- Janick Gers – guitar (Disc one; tracks 15, 16, 19 and 21, Disc two; tracks 1 to 16)
- Clive Burr – drums (Disc one; tracks 1 to 4, 18, Disc two; track 17)
- Nicko McBrain – drums (Disc one; tracks 5 to 17, 19 to 21, Disc two; tracks 1 to 16, 18 and 19)

Production

- Doug Smith – director (Disc one; track 1)
- Dave Hillier – director (Disc one; track 2)
- David Mallet – director (Disc one; tracks 3 and 4)
- Jim Yukich – director (Disc one; tracks 5, 6, 8 and 9)
- Tony Halton – director (Disc one; track 7)
- Julian Caidan – director (Disc one; tracks 10 and 13)
- Julian Doyle – director (Disc one; track 11)
- Toby Philips – director (Disc one; track 12)
- Wing Ko – director (Disc two; tracks 2 and 7)
- E. Matthies – director (Disc two; track 2)
- Ralph Ziman – director (Disc two; track 3)
- Samuel Bayer – director (Disc two; tracks 4 to 6)
- Steve Lazarus – director (Disc two; tracks 8 to 10, 12), editor (Disc two; tracks 8, 10, 12)
- Simon Hilton – director (Disc two; track 11)
- Dean Karr – director (Disc one; track 20, Disc two; tracks 13 and 15)
- Dave Pattenden – director (Disc two; track 14)
- Trevor Thompson – director (Disc two; track 14)
- Bob Cesca – director (Disc one; tracks 17 and 18, Disc two; tracks 16 to 19)
- Jerry Behrens – editor (Disc one; tracks 12 and 13)
- Will Malone – producer (Disc one; track 1)
- Doug Hall – producer (Disc one; track 2)
- Martin Birch – producer (Disc one; tracks 3 to 18, Disc two; tracks 17 to 19)
- Tony Wilson – producer (Disc one; track 13)
- Nigel Green – producer (Disc one; tracks 19 and 21, Disc two; tracks 7 to 12)
- Kevin Shirley – producer (Disc one; track 20, Disc two; tracks 13 to 16)
- Peacock – sleeve illustration, sleeve design
- Rod Smallwood – management
- Andy Taylor – management
- Merck Mercuriadis – management

== Charts ==
| Country | Chart (2003) | Peak position |
|---|---|---|
| Austria | Ö3 Austria Top 10 DVD | 5 |
| Netherlands | MegaCharts | 6 |
| Sweden | Sverigetopplistan | 1 |
| United Kingdom | UK Music Video Charts | 2 |
| Country | Chart (2004) | Peak position |
| Finland | The Official Finnish Charts | 1 |
| Spain | PROMUSICAE | 1 |
| Country | Chart (2005) | Peak position |
| Greece | IFPI Greece | 4 |

== Certifications ==
| Region | Certification | Certified units/sales |
|---|---|---|
| Argentina (CAPIF) | Platinum | 8,000^{^} |
| Australia (ARIA) | Platinum | 15,000^{^} |
| Canada (Music Canada) | 3× Platinum | 30,000^{^} |
| Finland (Musiikkituottajat) | 2× Platinum | 21,309 |
| France (SNEP) | Gold | 10,000^{*} |
| Germany (BVMI) | Gold | 25,000^{^} |
| Spain (Promusicae) | Platinum | 25,000^{^} |
| Sweden (GLF) | Gold | 10,000^{^} |
| United Kingdom (BPI) | Platinum | 50,000^{^} |
| United States (RIAA) | 2× Platinum | 100,000^{^} |
^{*} Sales figures based on certification alone.^{^} Shipments figures based on certification alone.
