= Best of the 'B' Sides =

- Cover art by Mark Wilkinson

Compilation album by Iron Maiden
- Released: 4 November 2002
- Recorded: 1979–1999
- Genre: Heavy metal
- Length: 2:14:10

Iron Maiden chronology
Beast over Hammersmith (2002)	Best of the 'B' Sides (2002)	Edward the Great (2002)

Best of the 'B' Sides is a compilation of B-sides by the English heavy metal band Iron Maiden, released on 4 November 2002 as part of the Eddie's Archive box set. Each track was remastered and the set came with a running commentary from Rod Smallwood. It covers all of their singles from their first (1980's "Running Free") to 2000's "Out of the Silent Planet", although several of the band's original B-sides were excluded from the collection: "Total Eclipse" (from "Run to the Hills", 1982, although this has been added to the album The Number of the Beast from 1998 onwards), "Mission From 'Arry" (from "2 Minutes to Midnight", 1984); "Bayswater Ain't a Bad Place to Be" (from "Be Quick or Be Dead", 1992); and "I Live My Way" (from "Man on the Edge", 1995). Also missing are the band's cover of Thin Lizzy's "Massacre" (from "Can I Play with Madness", 1988) and a number of live B-sides.

The album is described on the band's website as "a collection that not only reveals much about the band as individuals and the inherent character of the band, but also provides a real insight into who and where their influences came from." The cover, by the same Mark Wilkinson that drew the art on the Eddie's Archive metal box, has Eddie inside a tour bus, mooning and giving the finger to the viewer.

== Track listing ==
=== Disc One ===
No.	Title	Writer(s)	Original single	Length
1.	"Burning Ambition"	Steve Harris	1980 ~ Running Free	2:42
2.	"Drifter" (Live in London, UK 1980)	Harris	1980 ~ Sanctuary (1981 ~ Killers)	6:03
3.	"Invasion"	Harris	1980 ~ Women in Uniform	2:39
4.	"Remember Tomorrow" (Live in Padua, Italy 1981)	Harris, Paul Di'Anno	1982 ~ The Number of the Beast (1980 ~ Iron Maiden)	5:28
5.	"I've Got the Fire" (Montrose cover)	Ronnie Montrose	1983 ~ Flight of Icarus	2:39
6.	"Cross-Eyed Mary" (Jethro Tull cover)	Ian Anderson	1983 ~ The Trooper	3:56
7.	"Rainbow's Gold" (Beckett cover)	Terry Slesser, Kenny Mountain	1984 ~ 2 Minutes to Midnight	4:59
8.	"King of Twilight" (Nektar cover) (includes parts of "Crying in the Dark")	Nektar	1984 ~ Aces High	4:53
9.	"Reach Out"	Dave Colwell	1986 ~ Wasted Years	3:33
10.	"That Girl" (FM cover)	Andy Barnett, Merv Goldsworthy, Pete Jupp	1986 ~ Stranger in a Strange Land	5:05
11.	"Juanita" (Marshall Fury cover)	Steve Barnacle, Derek O'Neil	1986 ~ Stranger in a Strange Land	3:47
12.	"Sheriff of Huddersfield"	Iron Maiden	1986 ~ Wasted Years	3:35
13.	"Black Bart Blues"	Harris, Bruce Dickinson	1988 ~ Can I Play With Madness	6:41
14.	"Prowler" (1988 Version)	Harris	1988 ~ The Evil That Men Do (1980 ~ Iron Maiden)	4:09
15.	"Charlotte the Harlot" (1988 Version)	Dave Murray	1988 ~ The Evil That Men Do (1980 ~ Iron Maiden)	4:13

=== Disc Two ===
No.	Title	Writer(s)	Original single	Length
1.	"All in Your Mind" (Stray cover)	Del Bromham	1990 ~ Holy Smoke	4:31
2.	"Kill Me Ce Soir" (Golden Earring cover)	George Kooymans, Barry Hay, John Fenton	1990 ~ Holy Smoke	6:17
3.	"I'm a Mover" (Free cover)	Andy Fraser, Paul Rodgers	1990 ~ Bring Your Daughter... to the Slaughter	3:29
4.	"Communication Breakdown" (Led Zeppelin cover)	John Bonham, John Paul Jones, Jimmy Page	1990 ~ Bring Your Daughter... to the Slaughter	2:42
5.	"Nodding Donkey Blues"	Iron Maiden	1992 ~ Be Quick or Be Dead	3:17
6.	"Space Station No. 5" (Montrose cover)	Ronnie Montrose, Sammy Hagar	1992 ~ Be Quick or Be Dead	3:47
7.	"I Can't See My Feelings" (Budgie cover)	Tony Bourge, Burke Shelley	1992 ~ From Here to Eternity	3:50
8.	"Roll Over Vic Vella" (Cover of "Roll Over Beethoven") (with different lyrics)	Chuck Berry	1992 ~ From Here to Eternity	4:48
9.	"Justice of the Peace"	Murray, Harris	1995 ~ Man on the Edge	3:33
10.	"Judgement Day"	Blaze Bayley, Gers	1995 ~ Man on the Edge	4:04
11.	"My Generation" (The Who cover)	Pete Townshend	1996 ~ Lord of the Flies	3:37
12.	"Doctor Doctor" (UFO cover)	Michael Schenker, Phil Mogg	1996 ~ Lord of the Flies	4:50
13.	"Blood on the World's Hands" (Live in Gothenburg, Sweden 1995)	Harris	1998 ~ The Angel and the Gambler (1995 ~ The X Factor)	6:07
14.	"The Aftermath" (Live in Gothenburg, Sweden 1995)	Harris, Bayley, Gers	1998 ~ The Angel and the Gambler (1995 ~ The X Factor)	6:45
15.	"Futureal" (Live in Helsinki, Finland 1999)	Harris, Bayley	2000 ~ The Wicker Man (1998 ~ Virtual XI)	3:01
16.	"Wasted Years" (Live in Milan, Italy 1999)	Smith	2000 ~ Out of the Silent Planet (1986 ~ Somewhere in Time)	5:00

== Personnel ==
Production and performance credits are adapted from the album liner notes.

Iron Maiden

- Steve Harris – bass guitar, producer (disc 2, tracks 5–7 and 9–14)
- Dave Murray – guitar
- Doug Sampson – drums (disc 1, track 1)
- Paul Di'Anno – lead vocals (disc 1, tracks 1–3)
- Dennis Stratton – guitar (disc 1, tracks 2 and 3)
- Clive Burr – drums (disc 1, tracks 2–4)
- Adrian Smith – guitar (disc 1, tracks 4–15; disc 2, tracks 15 and 16), lead vocals (disc 1, track 9)
- Bruce Dickinson – lead vocals (disc 1, tracks 4–8 and 10–15; disc 2, tracks 1–8, 15 and 16), backing vocals (disc 1, track 9)
- Nicko McBrain – drums (disc 1, tracks 5–15; disc 2)
- Janick Gers – guitar (disc 2)
- Blaze Bayley – lead vocals (disc 2, tracks 9–14)

Production

- Guy Edwards – producer (disc 1, track 1)
- Will Malone – producer (disc 1, track 2)
- "Iron Maiden" – producer (disc 1, track 3; disc 2, tracks 15 and 16)
- Martin Birch – producer (disc 1, tracks 4–15; disc 2, tracks 1–8)
- Nigel Green – producer (disc 2, tracks 9–12)
- Mark Wilkinson – cover illustration
- Nick Watson – mastering
- Rod Smallwood – management
- Andy Taylor – management
- Merck Mercuriadis – management
