= Ed Hunter =

1999 album and video game by Iron Maiden and Synthetic Dimensions

Compilation album & video game by Iron Maiden & Synthetic Dimensions
- Released: 17 May 1999
- Recorded: 1980–1998
- Genre: Heavy metal
- Length: 103:16
- Label: EMI

Iron Maiden chronology
Eddie's Head (1998)	Ed Hunter (1999)	Brave New World (2000)

Professional ratings
Review scores
Source	Rating
AllMusic	3/5 stars
Melody Maker	4/5 stars

Ed Hunter is a greatest hits album and video game released in 1999 by English heavy metal band Iron Maiden and Synthetic Dimensions. The game objective consists of following Iron Maiden's mascot, Eddie, through various levels depicting the band's past album covers. The accompanying CDs have the group's most popular songs, as selected by fans on the band's official website.

The album was released alongside a tour of the same name, in which the band only played songs which were featured in the compilation. The tour itself was also notable for marking the return of former guitarist Adrian Smith and vocalist Bruce Dickinson, who had left the band in 1990 and 1993, respectively.

== Overview ==
The band's intention to release their own video game was announced in a sticker which appeared on the case of their 1996 compilation album, Best of the Beast, which stated, "Available soon... Melt, Eddie's own state-of-the-art 3D game." In September 1997, the band announced that the Melt project had been cancelled, with then vocalist Blaze Bayley commenting, "It was crap. Maiden want to give their fans something to blow them away. The new one will." The band also revealed that a different game would be released in its place, with Bayley commenting, "This game is nearly there. You've got to get to Eddie through time and space, heaven and hell..... the works ! It's a shoot 'em up which we promise will out-shoot`em all." Prior to its release, bassist Steve Harris commented that "it's the most amazing thing I've ever seen. I don't get shocked very often, but Ed Hunter was so good. It's like walking into a 3D version of the Somewhere in Time album cover, like going into the bar at the Ruskin Arms, only full of aliens and stuff. You go in and we'll be, like, holograms playing in the corner, or sitting at a table gambling. And then you've actually got the game itself, which is, like, this big shoot-'em-up chase through space and time to catch Eddie. It's brilliant." Originally slated for release in the Spring of 1998, the game was then pushed back to Christmas 1998 and eventually July 1999 to tie in with The Ed Hunter Tour.

The package includes three CDs. The first CD contains 14 songs, the second CD contains six songs and the installation program for the game, and the third CD contains the game data. The soundtrack consists of the top 20 songs voted for by Iron Maiden fans on the band's official website. The US version also contained a hidden bonus track of a new vocal version of "Wrathchild" with Bruce Dickinson.

The game passes through various levels, starting in London's East End before progressing to a psychiatric hospital, hell, and other various locations, all of which are lifted from the covers of past Iron Maiden albums. While the gameplay itself consists of shooting the appearing enemies with the mouse cursor, it acts as a rail shooter, meaning that the player has no control over movement apart from occasionally choosing the route he will take through the levels. In spite of this, the user can select which tracks play in the background, although only one song can be chosen for each level, which led to critics complaining about the soundtrack's repetitiveness.

The Ed Hunter Tour was the tour supporting the album and was the first tour with Bruce Dickinson on vocal duties since 1993, and with Adrian Smith on guitar since 1988.

== Levels ==
1. London's East End (Iron Maiden / Killers)
2. The Shady Pines Asylum (Piece of Mind)
3. The Pits of Hell (The Number of the Beast)
4. The Graveyard (Live After Death)
5. The Pharaoh's Tomb (Powerslave)
6. Blade Runner (Somewhere in Time)
7. Futureal
8. Finale

== Track listing ==
Disc One
No.	Title	Writer(s)	Original album	Length
1.	"Iron Maiden" (Live in Long Beach, USA 1985)	Steve Harris	1985 ~ Live After Death (1980 ~ Iron Maiden)	4:27
2.	"The Trooper"	Harris	1983 ~ Piece of Mind	4:11
3.	"The Number of the Beast"	Harris	1982 ~ The Number of the Beast	4:51
4.	"Wrathchild"	Harris	1981 ~ Killers	2:54
5.	"Futureal"	Harris, Blaze Bayley	1998 ~ Virtual XI	2:54
6.	"Fear of the Dark"	Harris	1992 ~ Fear of the Dark	7:17
7.	"Be Quick or Be Dead"	Bruce Dickinson, Janick Gers	1992 ~ Fear of the Dark	3:24
8.	"2 Minutes to Midnight"	Adrian Smith, Dickinson	1984 ~ Powerslave	6:00
9.	"Man on the Edge"	Bayley, Gers	1995 ~ The X Factor	4:11
10.	"Aces High"	Harris	1984 ~ Powerslave	4:29
11.	"The Evil That Men Do"	Smith, Dickinson, Harris	1988 ~ Seventh Son of a Seventh Son	4:34
12.	"Wasted Years"	Smith	1986 ~ Somewhere in Time	5:05
13.	"Powerslave"	Dickinson	1984 ~ Powerslave	6:48
14.	"Hallowed Be Thy Name"	Harris	1982 ~ The Number of the Beast	7:14

US Bonus Track
No.	Title	Writer(s)	Original album	Length
15.	"Wrathchild" (1999 Version)	Harris	Previously unreleased (1981 ~ Killers)	2:56

Disc Two
No.	Title	Writer(s)	Original album	Length
1.	"Run to the Hills"	Harris	1982 ~ The Number of the Beast	3:54
2.	"The Clansman"	Harris	1998 ~ Virtual XI	8:59
3.	"Phantom of the Opera"	Harris	1980 ~ Iron Maiden	7:06
4.	"Killers"	Harris, Paul Di'Anno	1981 ~ Killers	5:00
5.	"Stranger in a Strange Land"	Smith	1986 ~ Somewhere in Time	5:43
6.	"Tailgunner"	Harris, Dickinson	1990 ~ No Prayer for the Dying	4:15
Total length:				103:16

== Personnel ==
Production credits are adapted from the album liner notes.

Iron Maiden

- Steve Harris – bass guitar, producer (disc 1: tracks 5–7 and 9; disc 2: track 2), keyboards (disc 1: track 11; disc 2: track 2)
- Dave Murray – guitar
- Adrian Smith – guitar (all tracks excluding disc 1: tracks 5–7 & 9; disc 2: tracks 2, 3 & 6), keyboards (disc 1, track 11)
- Bruce Dickinson – lead vocals (all tracks excluding disc 1: tracks 4, 5 & 9; disc 2: tracks 2–4)
- Nicko McBrain – drums (all tracks excluding disc 1: tracks 3, 4 & 14; disc 2: tracks 1, 3 & 4)
- Paul Di'Anno – lead vocals (disc 1: track 4; disc 2: tracks 3 & 4)
- Clive Burr – drums (disc 1: tracks 3, 4 & 14; disc 2: tracks 1, 3 & 4)
- Janick Gers – guitar (disc 1: tracks 5–7 & 9; disc 2: tracks 2 & 6)
- Blaze Bayley – lead vocals (disc 1: tracks 5 & 9; disc 2: track 2)
- Dennis Stratton – guitar (disc 2: track 3)

Additional musicians

- Michael Kenney – keyboards (disc 1: tracks 5–7 & 9; disc 2: track 6)

Production

- Martin Birch – producer (all tracks excluding disc 1: tracks 5 & 9; disc 2: tracks 2–3)
- Nigel Green – producer (disc 1: tracks 5 & 9; disc 2: track 2)
- Will Malone – producer (disc 2, track 3)
- Simon Heyworth – mastering
- Synthetic Dimensions – sleeve design and artwork
- Ross Halfin – photography
- Rod Smallwood – management
- Andy Taylor – management
- Merck Mercuriadis – management

== Charts ==
Chart (1999)	Peak position
Dutch Albums (Album Top 100)	69
Finnish Albums (Suomen virallinen lista)	27
German Albums (Offizielle Top 100)	94
Swedish Albums (Sverigetopplistan)	43

== Certifications ==
Region	Certification	Certified units/sales
United Kingdom (BPI)	Silver	60,000^{‡}
^{‡} Sales+streaming figures based on certification alone.
