= The X Factor (album) =

Studio album by Iron Maiden
- Released: 2 October 1995
- Recorded: 1994 – August 1995
- Studios: Barnyard (Essex, England)
- Genre: Heavy metal
- Length: 70:54
- Label: EMI
- Producers: Steve Harris; Nigel Green

Iron Maiden chronology
Maiden England (1994)	The X Factor (1995)	Best of the Beast (1996)

Alternative cover
- Reverse side of the cover, deemed "less graphic" for retailers

Singles from The X Factor
- 1. "Man on the Edge" Released: 25 September 1995; 2. "Lord of the Flies" Released: 2 February 1996

The X Factor is the tenth studio album by the English heavy metal band Iron Maiden, released on 2 October 1995 through EMI Records. CMC International released it in North America. It is the first of two albums by the band to include vocalist Blaze Bayley, formerly of Wolfsbane, replacing Bruce Dickinson, who left the Iron Maiden following their previous tour to pursue a solo career. It also saw the departure of the band's longtime producer Martin Birch, who retired shortly after the release of their previous album, Fear of the Dark (1992). The X Factor takes a darker tone than the band's first nine releases, due to the lyrics being based on personal issues surrounding Steve Harris at the time, who was in the midst of a divorce. This is reflected in the cover artwork, which graphically depicts the band's mascot, Eddie, being vivisected by a machine.

== Background ==
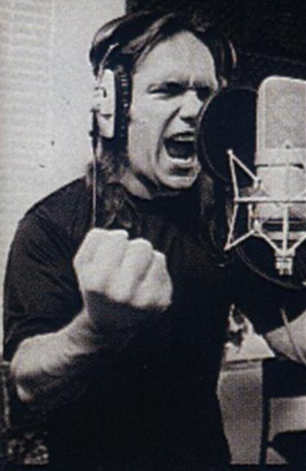
This was the band's first album with vocalist Blaze Bayley.

The album title came about at the start of the recording. According to producer Nigel Green: "We all felt that the way things were progressing – the songs, Blaze's new involvement, the sound, the commitment – the new album really would have that extra quality, that bit of magic, that 'X Factor'. This became the working title for the album and we liked it, so we kept it. It is also very apt as this is our tenth studio album and 'X' can bring up many images".

The cover art, depicting Eddie undergoing another lobotomy (he is depicted as being lobotomized on the cover of the band's 1983 album, Piece of Mind), was created by Hugh Syme. Due to the cover's "lifelike" style, the band was forced to release the album in a reversible sleeve, with a less graphic view of Eddie from a distance.

The album was the last, until 2015's The Book of Souls, to use the classic variant of the band's logo: every studio release from Virtual XI to The Final Frontier used an alternative that removed the extended ends of the "R", "M", and both "N's".

The X Factor is also unusual in that it yielded several band compositions that did not make it onto the album. "We actually ended up doing 14 songs and we used eleven", said Steve Harris, "which is very unusual for us". The three songs that did not make the cut, "I Live My Way", "Justice of The Peace", and "Judgement Day", were released as B-sides to the album's singles. The latter two would also be featured on the Best of the 'B' Sides collection.

The X Factor was Maiden's tenth consecutive UK top-ten album but spent only four weeks on the chart—making it their shortest-staying studio album.

The band supported the album with the X Factour. Much like the tour for the following album, Virtual XI, several dates in the United States were cancelled, as Bayley suffered from occasional vocal issues from the band's heavy concert schedule.

== Song details ==
Although "Sign of the Cross" was originally planned as the first single, "Man on the Edge" and "Lord of the Flies" were released instead, and all three remained in Iron Maiden set lists following Bruce Dickinson's return. Live versions of these songs with Dickinson on vocals can be found on "The Wicker Man" single and the live albums Death on the Road, Rock in Rio, and Nights of the Dead, respectively, while the same live takes of "Man on the Edge" and "Sign of the Cross" were later re-released on Iron Maiden's 2011 compilation album, From Fear to Eternity.

"The Edge of Darkness" is based on the 1979 film Apocalypse Now, adapted from Joseph Conrad's novel Heart of Darkness. "Man on the Edge" is based on the 1993 movie Falling Down, and "Lord of the Flies" is derived from the William Golding novel of the same name. "Sign of the Cross" is based on the Umberto Eco novel The Name of the Rose. Live recordings of "Blood on the World's Hands" and "The Aftermath" were included on Best of the 'B' Sides.

Three music videos were produced for "Man on the Edge", one of them being filmed at the Masada fortress in Israel. Another version featured footage from black-and-white silent films depicting slapstick comedy. This video was later included as an Easter egg on the Visions of the Beast DVD.

Blaze Bayley later recorded a re-arranged version of "Sign of the Cross" on the live album As Live as It Gets.

== Critical reception ==
Professional ratings
Review scores
Source	Rating
AllMusic	2/5 stars
Collector's Guide to Heavy Metal	2/10
Sputnikmusic	3.5/5

The X Factor was met with lukewarm responses from critics. AllMusic rated the album two stars out of five, stating that "suffering from a lack of powerful riffs and tightly written songs, The X Factor is a lackluster latter-day album from Iron Maiden. Although the band doesn't sound particularly bad on the record, they don't sound inspired and there's a noticeable lack of energy to the performances which makes the lack of imagination all the more apparent."

Sputnikmusic were somewhat more positive about the release, deeming the album "a change for Iron Maiden, and a very important one at that" as it "paved the way for future albums of similar length". They also praised the "often criticized" Blaze Bayley, whose voice they claimed "was perfect for the new release".

== Track listing ==
The X Factor track listing
No.	Title	Writer(s)	Length
1.	"Sign of the Cross"	Steve Harris	11:16
2.	"Lord of the Flies"	Harris; Janick Gers	5:02
3.	"Man on the Edge"	Blaze Bayley; Gers	4:10
4.	"Fortunes of War"	Harris	7:25
5.	"Look for the Truth"	Bayley; Gers; Harris	5:10
6.	"The Aftermath"	Harris; Bayley; Gers	6:20
7.	"Judgement of Heaven"	Harris	5:10
8.	"Blood on the World's Hands"	Harris	6:00
9.	"The Edge of Darkness"	Harris; Bayley; Gers	6:39
10.	"2 A.M."	Bayley; Gers; Harris	5:37
11.	"The Unbeliever"	Harris; Gers	8:05
Total length:			70:54

Japanese edition bonus disc
No.	Title	Writer(s)	Length
1.	"Justice of the Peace"	Harris; Dave Murray	3:34
2.	"I Live My Way"	Harris; Bayley; Gers	3:48
3.	"Judgement Day"	Bayley; Gers	4:02
Total length:			11:24

== Personnel ==
Production and performance credits are adapted from the album liner notes.

=== Iron Maiden ===
- Blaze Bayley – vocals
- Janick Gers – guitar
- Dave Murray – guitar
- Steve Harris – bass guitar, production, mixing
- Nicko McBrain – drums

=== Additional musicians ===
- Michael Kenney – keyboards
- The Xpression Choir – Gregorian chants on "Sign of the Cross"

=== Production ===
- Nigel Green – producer, engineer, mixing
- Ronal Whelan – mastering
- Mick McKenna – assistant engineer
- Les Lambert – assistant engineer
- Hugh Syme – digital illustration, sleeve design, art direction
- Ross Halfin – photography
- Simon Fowler – photography
- Tony Frederick – photography

== Charts ==
Chart (1995)	Peak position
Australian Albums (ARIA)	64
Austrian Albums (Ö3 Austria)	19
Belgian Albums (Ultratop Flanders)	19
Belgian Albums (Ultratop Wallonia)	8
Dutch Albums (Album Top 100)	29
Finnish Albums (Suomen virallinen lista)	2
French Albums (SNEP)	11
German Albums (Offizielle Top 100)	16
Hungarian Albums (MAHASZ)	23
Italian Albums (FIMI)	5
Japanese Albums (Oricon)	17
Norwegian Albums (VG-lista)	6
Scottish Albums (Official Charts)	15
Spanish Albums (AFYVE)	21
Swedish Albums (Sverigetopplistan)	4
Swiss Albums (Schweizer Hitparade)	27
UK Albums (Official Charts)	8
UK Rock & Metal Albums (Official Charts)	2
US Billboard 200	147

Chart (2017)	Peak position
Italian Albums (FIMI)	55
Spanish Albums (Promusicae)	75

== Certifications ==
Region	Certification	Certified units/sales
United Kingdom (BPI)	Silver	60,000^{*}
^{*} Sales figures based on certification alone.
