= Rock in Rio (album) =

Live album and video by Iron Maiden
- Released: 25 March 2002 (audio); 10 June 2002 (video)
- Recorded: 19 January 2001
- Venue: Rock in Rio festival, Rio de Janeiro
- Genre: Heavy metal
- Length: 116:06 (audio); 125:00 (video, approx.)
- Label: EMI; Sanctuary (video)
- Producer: Kevin Shirley

Iron Maiden chronology
Brave New World (2000)	Rock in Rio (2002)	Eddie's Archive (2002)

Iron Maiden video chronology
Classic Albums: Iron Maiden – The Number of the Beast (2001)	Rock in Rio (2002)	Visions of the Beast (2003)

Alternative cover
- DVD cover

Singles from Rock in Rio
- 1. "Run to the Hills" Released: 11 March 2002

Professional ratings
Review scores
Source	Rating
AllMusic	2/5 stars
PopMatters (video)	favourable

Rock in Rio is a live album and video by English heavy metal band Iron Maiden, recorded at the Rock in Rio festival, Brazil in 2001 on the last night of the Brave New World Tour. The band played to approximately 250,000 people; the second largest crowd of their career (the band's largest concert attendance was their 1985 Rock In Rio performance to an audience of 350,000) and with the relatively recent return of lead singer Bruce Dickinson and guitarist Adrian Smith to the band, they recorded their fifth live release.

It features many of their most well-known tracks, including the eponymous "Iron Maiden" and "Run to the Hills," along with six songs from Brave New World, such as "The Wicker Man" and the title track. Also performed were two tracks from the Blaze Bayley-era, "Sign of the Cross" and "The Clansman".

The video release, which was issued on DVD, VHS and UMD, was edited by bassist and founder member Steve Harris. In addition to the concert, the second disc also includes three special features with interviews with band members, a short documentary on the day in the life of Iron Maiden, and photos by official photographer, Ross Halfin.

== Background ==
Iron Maiden's performance at Rock in Rio festival was the final show of their 2000-01 tour, Brave New World Tour. Due to the magnitude of the event (the concert was performed to 250,000 people on the day and an estimated worldwide TV audience of over one billion), the band decided that it should be the basis of their next double live album and first concert DVD release.

To film the concert, the band hired American director Dean Karr, who had previously worked with the group on "The Wicker Man" music video. According to Karr, eighteen cameras were used to capture the show in Rio and additional footage for the DVD was shot throughout their South American tour. This included a performance in Chile, during which cameras were attached to the band's guitars and on singer Bruce Dickinson's shoulders. Dickinson was not pleased with the placement of some cameras at the Rio show and confesses that he had a "little temperamental moment" when he found one blocking a ladder up to his catwalk, which he promptly destroyed.

In spite of this, Dickinson remembers the show very fondly, stating that it was "a fantastic way to end the tour" and that "the energy we expended that night was just incredible". Although he agreed that the band "played well", bassist Steve Harris' enjoyment of the gig was hampered by technical difficulties. Due to the PA malfunctioning on the edge of the stage, Harris "had to stay firmly within my area for the whole night", which meant that he could not interact with the crowd as much as he would have wished.

Although he had been behind the band's previous two concert films, Maiden England (1989) and Donington Live 1992, Harris decided not to edit the project himself, stating that he "wanted a fresh pair of eyes on Maiden. I was after someone else's input and direction over my style", and a professional editing company was hired instead. These circumstances changed, however, when he first saw the edits while producing the soundtrack with Kevin Shirley in New York. According to Harris, the editors had opted for several "styling decisions", including "deliberately out of focus shots of the lighting rig", which "just horrified us". In addition, the crew had also lost the footage from two cameras, which meant that there were very few shots of guitarists Dave Murray and Adrian Smith.

To remedy the situation, Harris reluctantly decided to undertake the editing work himself, despite being "burnt out and ready for time off" following the tour's conclusion. To achieve the desired results, Harris had to teach himself how to use complex digital editing systems and installed all the necessary equipment in his home studio in Essex. Although this meant over six months editing, which led to a postponed release date, Harris was pleased with the results and argues that it is better than their first concert film, Live After Death.

== Track listing ==
All tracks are written by Steve Harris, except where noted.

Disc one
No.	Title	Writer(s)	Length
1.	"Arthur's Farewell" (intro)	Jerry Goldsmith	1:55
2.	"The Wicker Man"	Adrian Smith; Harris; Bruce Dickinson	4:41
3.	"Ghost of the Navigator"	Janick Gers; Dickinson; Harris	6:48
4.	"Brave New World"	Dave Murray; Harris; Dickinson	6:06
5.	"Wrathchild"		3:05
6.	"2 Minutes to Midnight"	Smith; Dickinson	6:26
7.	"Blood Brothers"		7:15
8.	"Sign of the Cross"		10:49
9.	"The Mercenary"	Gers; Harris	4:42
10.	"The Trooper"		4:33
Total length:			56:20

Disc two
No.	Title	Writer(s)	Length
1.	"Dream of Mirrors"	Gers; Harris	9:37
2.	"The Clansman"		9:19
3.	"The Evil That Men Do"	Smith; Dickinson; Harris	4:40
4.	"Fear of the Dark"		7:40
5.	"Iron Maiden"		5:51
6.	"The Number of the Beast"		5:00
7.	"Hallowed Be Thy Name"		7:23
8.	"Sanctuary"	Harris; Murray; Paul Di'Anno	5:17
9.	"Run to the Hills"		4:59
Total length:			59:46

=== DVD bonus features ===
- Candid interviews with the band members.
- "A Day in the Life" of Iron Maiden.
- Ross Halfin Photo Diary – 50 exclusive photos from Iron Maiden's South American Tour, commentary from official photographer, Ross Halfin.
- Several secret short videos.

== Personnel ==
Production and performance credits are adapted from the album and DVD liner notes.

=== Iron Maiden ===
- Bruce Dickinson – lead vocals
- Dave Murray – guitars
- Adrian Smith – guitars, backing vocals
- Janick Gers – guitars
- Steve Harris – bass, backing vocals
- Nicko McBrain — drums

=== Additional musicians ===
- Michael Kenney – keyboards

=== Production ===
- Kevin Shirley – producer, engineer, mixing
- Claudius Mittendorfer – assistant engineer
- Dean Karr – director (video), photography
- Arthur Gorson – producer (video)
- Mick Hutson – cover photography
- Ross Halfin – photography
- Peacock – sleeve design, sleeve concept

== Charts ==
=== Album ===
Chart (2002)	Peak position
Australian Albums (ARIA)	85
Austrian Albums (Ö3 Austria)	17
Belgian Albums (Ultratop Flanders)	28
Belgian Albums (Ultratop Wallonia)	37
Dutch Albums (Album Top 100)	43
Finnish Albums (Suomen virallinen lista)	8
French Albums (SNEP)	25
Italian Albums (FIMI)	7
German Albums (Offizielle Top 100)	13
Japanese Albums (Oricon)	43
Norwegian Albums (VG-lista)	14
Scottish Albums (OCC)	16
Swedish Albums (Sverigetopplistan)	14
Swiss Albums (Schweizer Hitparade)	17
UK Albums (OCC)	15
UK Rock & Metal Albums (OCC)	3
US Billboard 200	186

Chart (2017)	Peak position
Spanish Albums (PROMUSICAE)	66

Chart (2020)	Peak position
Hungarian Albums (MAHASZ)	27

=== Video ===
Chart (2002)	Peak position
Australia (ARIA Charts)	3
Finland (The Official Finnish Charts)	3
Germany (Media Control Charts)	2
Norway (VG-lista)	2
United Kingdom (UK Music Video Chart)	1
United States (Billboard charts)	2

== Certifications ==
=== Album ===
Region	Certification	Certified units/sales
Brazil (Pro-Música Brasil)	Gold	50,000^{*}
Greece (IFPI Greece)	Gold	15,000^{^}
Portugal (AFP)	Gold	20,000^{^}
United Kingdom (BPI)	Silver	60,000^{*}
^{*} Sales figures based on certification alone.^{^} Shipments figures based on certification alone.

=== Video ===
Region	Certification	Certified units/sales
Argentina (CAPIF)	Platinum	8,000^{^}
Australia (ARIA)	Gold	7,500^{^}
Canada (Music Canada)	2× Platinum	20,000^{^}
Germany (BVMI)	Gold	25,000^{^}
Poland (ZPAV)	Gold	5,000^{*}
Sweden (GLF)	Gold	10,000^{^}
United Kingdom (BPI)	Platinum	50,000^{*}
United States (RIAA)	Platinum	50,000^{^}
^{*} Sales figures based on certification alone.^{^} Shipments figures based on certification alone.
