= The Angel and the Gambler =

"The Angel & The Gambler"

Single by Iron Maiden

from the album Virtual XI
- B-side: 7" Picture Disc; "Blood on the World's Hands" (live); CD Part 1; "Blood on the World's Hands" (live); "Afraid to Shoot Strangers" (video); CD Part 2; "The Aftermath" (live); "Man on the Edge" (video)
- Released: 9 March 1998
- Genre: Blues rock; heavy metal
- Length: 9:56 (Part 1); 6:05 (Part 2)
- Label: EMI
- Songwriter: Steve Harris

Iron Maiden singles chronology
"Virus" (1996)	"The Angel & The Gambler" (1998)	"Futureal" (1998)

CD 2 cover

Picture Disc

"The Angel and the Gambler" is a single from the Iron Maiden album Virtual XI, released in 1998. It preceded the release of Virtual XI by two weeks.

== Synopsis ==
It is the first Iron Maiden single to feature a video as a B-side. The single includes two audio tracks recorded live at Kåren, Gothenburg, Sweden, in 1995 on The X Factour, their tour in support of The X Factor.

The band also released a music video, which featured a shortened version of the song. The video features an entirely computer-generated world filled with aliens of varying appearance.

The single was released in four parts: CD part 1 contains a poster, with the "Virtual XI Fixture List 1998" on one side and the band posing in Maiden football gear with some of their favourite players on the other side. CD part 2 contains three double-sided cards with the musicians posing in Maiden football gear and also has a shortened version of "The Angel and the Gambler". The third was a 7-inch picture disc and the fourth was a CD maxi-single with both B-side live tracks on it. The picture disc and maxi-single both had the edited version of the title track.

== B-sides ==
The 7-inch picture disc had "Blood On The Worlds Hands" live; CD 1 had "Blood On The Worlds Hands" also and "Afraid to Shoot Strangers" video; CD 2 had "The Aftermath" live and "Man on the Edge" video; the maxi-single had both live B-sides but only "Afraid to Shoot Strangers" video.

== Track listing ==
=== 7-inch picture disc ===
1. "The Angel and the Gambler" (edited version) (Steve Harris) - 6:05
2. "Blood on the World's Hands (live - Kåren, Gothenburg, Sweden 1 November 1995)" (Harris) - 6:07

=== CD part 1 ===
1. "The Angel and the Gambler" (full album version) (Harris) – 9:56
2. "Blood on the World's Hands" (live - Kåren, Gothenburg, Sweden 1 November 1995) (Harris) - 6:05
3. "Afraid to Shoot Strangers" (live video) (Harris)

=== CD part 2 ===
1. "The Angel and the Gambler" (edited version) (Harris) – 6:05
2. "The Aftermath" (live - Kåren, Gothenburg, Sweden 1 November 1995) (Harris, Blaze Bayley, Janick Gers) – 6:45
3. "Man on the Edge" (live video) (Bayley, Gers) – 4:12

=== CD Maxi-Single ===
1. "The Angel and the Gambler" (edited version) (Harris) – 6:05
2. "Blood on the World's Hands" (live - Kåren, Gothenburg, Sweden 1 November 1995) (Harris) - 6:05
3. "The Aftermath" (live - Kåren, Gothenburg, Sweden 1 November 1995) (Harris, Bayley, Gers) – 6:45
4. "Afraid to Shoot Strangers" (live video) (Harris)

== Personnel ==
Production credits are adapted from the CD Single cover.

Iron Maiden

- Blaze Bayley – vocals
- Dave Murray – guitar
- Janick Gers – guitar
- Steve Harris – bass guitar, keyboards, producer, mixing
- Nicko McBrain – drums

Production

- Nigel Green – mixing ("The Angel and the Gambler")
- Synthetic Dimensions – sleeve illustration
- Hugh Gilmour – layout

== Charts ==
Weekly chart performance for "The Angel and the Gambler"
Chart (1998)	Peak position
Europe (Eurochart Hot 100 Singles)	35
Finland (Suomen virallinen lista)	3
Germany (GfK)	61
Italy (FIMI)	3
Netherlands (Dutch Tipparade 40)	2
Netherlands (Single Top 100)	52
Spain (AFYVE)	5
Sweden (Sverigetopplistan)	29
UK Singles (Official Charts)	18
