= Stray (band) =

English hard rock band

- Stray in 1971. Left to right: Steve Gadd, Ritchie Cole, Gary Giles, Del Bromham

Background information
- Origin: London, England
- Genres: Hard rock; heavy metal; psychedelic rock; progressive rock; blues rock
- Years active: 1966–1977, 1980–1987, 1993, 1995–1997, 2023–present
- Labels: Sanctuary; Transatlantic; Pye
- Members: Steve Gadd; Del Bromham; Gary Giles; Ritchie Cole
- Past members: Pete Dyer; Steve Crutchley
- Website: www.straytheband.co.uk

Stray are an English hard rock band formed in London in 1966. Vocalist Steve Gadd (born Stephen Gadd, 27 April 1952, Shepherd's Bush, West London), guitarist Del Bromham (born Derek Roy Bromham, 25 November 1951, Acton, West London), bassist Gary Giles (born Gary Stephen Giles, 23 February 1952, North Kensington, West London) and drummer Steve Crutchley (born 1952) formed the band whilst all were attending the Christopher Wren School in London. Richard "Ritchie" Cole (born 10 November 1951, Shepherd's Bush, West London) replaced Crutchley in 1968. They signed to Transatlantic Records in January 1970.

Their brand of melodic, hook-laden hard rock proved to be a popular draw on the local club scene during the early 1970s. However, the band never achieved commercial success. At one stage Charlie Kray (brother of the Kray twins Ronnie and Reggie), was their manager. Gadd left the band in 1975 due to artistic differences and was replaced on vocals by Pete Dyer. The group's early musical style consisted of blues rock, acid rock and psychedelic rock. They then went on to join the hard rock and progressive rock movement.

The band served as the rhythm section alongside a string orchestra for the 1975 Jimmy Helms LP, Songs I Sing. The original Stray ended in 1977, although Bromham later continued to play in various resurrected versions of the project well into the 2000s. By the 2010s the band had a settled lineup again, as well as Del Bromham, Pete Dyer returned and Stuart Uren (bass) and Karl Randall (drums) were regularly gigging as Stray. In November 2016, the band hosted a 50th Anniversary celebration concert (featuring all original members) at a sold-out London Borderline.

In 2019, Colin Kempster replaced Stuart Uren as permanent bassist and, for live gigs, the band was also joined by Simon Rinaldo on keyboards. After successful concerts in late 2019 and an acclaimed set at the annual Giants of Rock Festival in Minehead, Stray set out on a full joint headlining tour with Ken Pustelnik’s Groundhogs in February and March in 2020.

in Autumn 2023 this line-up released a new studio album ‘About Time.’ The album features Stray’s classic hard rock sound together with the rounding benefit of Rinaldo’s keyboards. The songs focus on some of Bromham’s observations of the COVID experience together with his usual social commentary. The band toured the U.K. extensively in 2024 to promote the album together with European Festival dates.

In 2025 the band was touring the U.K. again, with the culmination being a November tour as special guests to British Lion.

In 2003, Stray were the support band to Iron Maiden on several of their European dates on the Dance of Death World Tour 2003-2004. These included dates in Spain, Portugal, Poland and France. There are two other Iron Maiden connections to Stray. "All in Your Mind" from Stray's 1970 debut album was covered by Iron Maiden and was included on the 1995 reissue of No Prayer for the Dying, and Maiden bassist Steve Harris's daughter Lauren has covered "Come On Over".

From late 2006 until early 2007, the band's back catalogue of eight studio albums issued originally during the 1970s, were re-released by the UK based Sanctuary Records in compact disc format. The new releases were remastered and had bonus tracks culled from single B-sides, studio outtakes and BBC broadcast sessions.

== Discography ==
=== Albums ===
- Stray (June 1970) Allmusic link
- Suicide (March 1971) Allmusic link
- Saturday Morning Pictures (February 1972) Allmusic link
- Mudanzas (May 1973) Allmusic link
- Move It (May 1974) Allmusic link
- Tracks (compilation with previously unreleased outtakes) (1975) Allmusic link
- Stand Up and Be Counted (June 1975) Allmusic link
- Houdini (March 1976) Allmusic link
- Hearts of Fire (December 1976) Allmusic link
- Reflecting A Generation (compilation) (1977) Allmusic link
- Live at the Marquee (live) (1984)
- New Dawn (1997)
- Alive and Giggin' (live) (1997)
- 10 (2001)
- Live: In Yer face! (live) (2002)
- Time Machine – Anthology 1970 – 1977 (double CD collection) (2003) Allmusic link
- Valhalla (2010) Allmusic link
- Live in Japan (live) (2014)
- About Time (2023)
