= Lord of the Flies (song) =

Single by Iron Maiden

from the album The X Factor
- B-side: "My Generation"; "Doctor Doctor"
- Released: April 1996; 2 February 1996
- Recorded: 1995
- Genre: Heavy metal
- Length: 5:03
- Label: EMI
- Songwriters: Steve Harris; Janick Gers

Iron Maiden singles chronology
"Man on the Edge" (1995)	"Lord of the Flies" (1996)	"Virus" (1996)

"Lord of the Flies" is an Iron Maiden single and second track on their 1995 album The X Factor. The song was written by guitarist Janick Gers and bassist Steve Harris and is based on the book and film of the same name.

== Background ==
The single was only released outside of the UK. Additional tracks on the single include covers from UFO and The Who. These tracks were later released in the UK on CD1 of the "Virus" single.

Iron Maiden frequently performed this song live during their Dance of Death tour from 2003–2004, making it one of only five Bayley era songs to remain in live set lists after his departure (the others being "Man on the Edge", "Sign of the Cross", "Futureal", and "The Clansman"). One such performance of this song is included on Iron Maiden's 2005 live album "Death on the Road".

The guitar solo is played by Janick Gers.

== Track listing ==
CD and 12" single

Side one
No.	Title	Writer(s)	Length
1.	"Lord of the Flies"	Janick Gers; Steve Harris	5:03

Side two
No.	Title	Writer(s)	Length
2.	"My Generation" (The Who cover)	Pete Townshend	3:36
3.	"Doctor Doctor" (UFO cover)	Michael Schenker; Phil Mogg	4:49

== Personnel ==
- Blaze Bayley – vocals
- Dave Murray – guitar
- Janick Gers – guitar
- Steve Harris – bass
- Nicko McBrain – drums
