= Man on the Edge =

Single by Iron Maiden

from the album The X Factor
- B-side: "The Edge of Darkness"; "Judgement Day"; "Justice of the Peace"; "I Live My Way"; "Blaze Bayley Interview"
- Released: 25 September 1995
- Recorded: 1994 – August 1995
- Studio: Barnyard (Essex)
- Length: 4:13
- Label: EMI
- Songwriters: Blaze Bayley; Janick Gers
- Producers: Steve Harris; Nigel Green

Iron Maiden singles chronology
"Hallowed Be Thy Name (live)" (1993)	"Man on the Edge" (1995)	"Lord of the Flies" (1996)

"Man on the Edge" is a single from the Iron Maiden album The X Factor released in 1995. The song is based on the film Falling Down, starring Michael Douglas. It was the first single the band released with Blaze Bayley on vocals.

== Synopsis ==
In addition to an interview with Bayley and another track from The X Factor, the single features three originals that did not make the album's final cut. It is one of two Blaze Bayley era songs to make it onto the Edward the Great compilation, along with "Futureal", as well as one of three to make it onto Best of the Beast along with "Sign of the Cross" and "Virus".

Iron Maiden frequently played this song during the Ed Hunter tour in 1999, making it one of 5 Bayley era songs to survive in concerts after his departure (The others being "Lord of the Flies", "Sign of the Cross", "Futureal", and "The Clansman").

A live version of this song from 1999 is featured on the 2000 single release of "The Wicker Man" and on the compilation From Fear to Eternity from 2011, with Bruce Dickinson on vocals.

There were three videos made for this song. One is filmed on location at Masada, Israel, the second is a more cinematic video of the band performing as a man throws himself off a building, and the third is a 'sneak-peek' promo video consisting only of clips of pratfalls from black and white silent movies was used for promotional purposes prior to release. This third version appears as an 'Easter Egg' on the Visions of the Beast DVD.

The song was featured in the video game Carmageddon 2.

On the cover of CD 1, Eddie's brain was cut in half, though on CD 2 he still has his brain attached. The 12" Picture Disc was the same as CD 1 though because it moved within the sleeve it could look very different, very much like an "X" in the right position.

== Track listing ==
CD single 1

No.	Title	Writer(s)	Length
1.	"Man on the Edge"	Blaze Bayley; Janick Gers	4:19
2.	"The Edge of Darkness"	Steve Harris; Bayley; Gers	6:40
3.	"Judgement Day"	Bayley; Gers	4:09
4.	"Blaze Bayley Interview - Part I"		5:41

CD single 2

No.	Title	Writer(s)	Length
1.	"Man on the Edge"	Bayley; Gers	4:19
2.	"The Edge of Darkness"	Harris; Bayley; Gers	6:40
3.	"Justice of the Peace"	Dave Murray; Harris	3:38
4.	"Blaze Bayley Interview - Part II"		5:55

12" picture disc

Side one
No.	Title	Writer(s)	Length
1.	"Man on the Edge"	Bayley; Gers	4:19

Side two
No.	Title	Writer(s)	Length
2.	"The Edge of Darkness"	Harris; Bayley; Gers	6:40
3.	"I Live My Way"	Harris; Bayley; Gers	3:48

== Personnel ==
Production credits are adapted from the CD and picture disc covers.

Iron Maiden

- Blaze Bayley – vocals
- Dave Murray – guitar
- Janick Gers – guitar
- Steve Harris – bass guitar, producer, mixing
- Nicko McBrain – drums

Production

- Nigel Green – producer, mixing
- Ronal Whelan – mastering

== Charts ==
Weekly chart performance for "Man on the Edge"
Chart (1995)	Peak position
Belgium (Ultratop 50 Wallonia)	18
Finland (Suomen virallinen lista)	1
France (SNEP)	33
Italy (Musica e dischi)	18
Netherlands (Single Top 100 Tipparade)	7
Norway (VG-lista)	18
Sweden (Sverigetopplistan)	23
UK Singles (Official Charts)	10

== Cover versions ==
- Middle Island, NY metal band Iron Rainbow recorded a cover of Man on the Edge that was featured on the 1998 Metal Injection (A Lethal Dose of Heavy Metal Mayhem) compilation album.
