= Best of the Beast =

Compilation album by Iron Maiden
- Released: 23 September 1996
- Recorded: 1978–1996
- Genre: Heavy metal
- Length: 77:53 (single disc CD); 149:40 (2-disc CD); 189:17 (4-disc LP)
- Label: EMI
- Producer: Martin Birch; Nigel Green; Steve Harris; Iron Maiden; Will Malone

Iron Maiden chronology
The X Factor (1995)	Best of the Beast (1996)	Virtual XI (1998)

Singles from Best of the Beast
- 1. "Virus" Released: 2 September 1996

Professional ratings
Review scores
Source	Rating
AllMusic	4.5/5 stars
Collector's Guide to Heavy Metal	7/10

Best of the Beast is Iron Maiden's first "best of" album, released in 1996 in three formats: a 34 track (four disc) vinyl, a 27 track (two disc) CD, a 16 track (single disc) CD and MiniDisc. The vinyl edition is, to date, the band's longest record release, running for over three hours.

== Background ==
The track listing differs slightly between the various editions of the compilation album, but consists mainly of the band's singles and most well-known songs from their 1980–1995 albums. Also included are a new single, entitled "Virus", as well as previously unreleased live versions of "Afraid to Shoot Strangers" and "Revelations" (the latter exclusive to the vinyl edition). Both "Virus" and "Afraid to Shoot Strangers" had promotional music videos created, the latter of which was filmed during The X Factour with new lead vocalist Blaze Bayley replacing Bruce Dickinson, who sang the original studio recording.

The two-CD edition contains two songs from the band's 1979 demo tape/EP The Soundhouse Tapes ("Iron Maiden" and "Strange World," of which the latter was previously unreleased). The 4-disc vinyl pressing, meanwhile, contains the entire Soundhouse Tapes EP on its final side, again with the addition of "Strange World" from the same sessions. The vinyl edition has become quite rare and has increased in value steadily over the years in music stores and on online auction sites. The standard edition's value has not changed much although the Japanese pressings continue to rise in value.

Best of the Beast has long since been out of print and has been "replaced" by Edward the Great in most countries as a greatest hits package for the band.

The cover art was designed by Derek Riggs, known for having created most of Iron Maiden's early album covers. It is an amalgamation of his most famous works with the band, featuring Eddies from the Piece of Mind, Powerslave, Somewhere in Time and No Prayer for the Dying eras, as well as those from "The Trooper", Live After Death and a redesign of the Killers album cover.

== Track listing ==
=== Standard edition CD and MD ===
No.	Title	Writer(s)	Original Album	Length
1.	"The Number of the Beast"	Steve Harris	1982 ~ The Number of the Beast	4:49
2.	"Can I Play With Madness"	Adrian Smith, Bruce Dickinson, Harris	1988 ~ Seventh Son of a Seventh Son	3:31
3.	"Fear of the Dark" (Live in Helsinki, Finland 1992)	Harris	1993 ~ A Real Live One (1992 ~ Fear of the Dark)	7:21
4.	"Run to the Hills"	Harris	1982 ~ The Number of the Beast	3:50
5.	"Bring Your Daughter... to the Slaughter"	Dickinson	1990 ~ No Prayer for the Dying	4:44
6.	"The Evil That Men Do"	Smith, Dickinson, Harris	1988 ~ Seventh Son of a Seventh Son	4:35
7.	"Aces High"	Harris	1984 ~ Powerslave	4:31
8.	"Be Quick or Be Dead"	Dickinson, Janick Gers	1992 ~ Fear of the Dark	3:21
9.	"2 Minutes to Midnight"	Smith, Dickinson	1984 ~ Powerslave	6:04
10.	"Man on the Edge"	Blaze Bayley, Gers	1995 ~ The X Factor	4:18
11.	"Virus"	Harris, Gers, Dave Murray, Bayley	New recording	6:30
12.	"Running Free" (Live in Long Beach, United States 1985)	Harris, Paul Di'Anno	1985 ~ Live After Death (1980 ~ Iron Maiden)	3:25
13.	"Wasted Years"	Smith	1986 ~ Somewhere in Time	5:06
14.	"The Clairvoyant"	Harris	1988 ~ Seventh Son of a Seventh Son	4:27
15.	"The Trooper"	Harris	1983 ~ Piece of Mind	4:11
16.	"Hallowed Be Thy Name"	Harris	1982 ~ The Number of the Beast	7:10
Total length:				77:53

=== Limited edition CD ===
Disc One
No.	Title	Writer(s)	Original Album	Length
1.	"Virus"	Harris, Gers, Murray, Bayley	New recording	6:30
2.	"Sign of the Cross"	Harris	1995 ~ The X Factor	11:17
3.	"Man on the Edge"	Bayley, Gers	1995 ~ The X Factor	4:18
4.	"Afraid to Shoot Strangers" (Live in Gothenburg, Sweden 1995)	Harris	Previously unreleased (1992 ~ Fear of the Dark)	6:48
5.	"Be Quick or Be Dead"	Dickinson, Gers	1992 ~ Fear of the Dark	3:21
6.	"Fear of the Dark" (Live at Helsinki, Finland 1992)	Harris	1993 ~ A Real Live One (1992 ~ Fear of the Dark)	7:21
7.	"Bring Your Daughter... to the Slaughter"	Dickinson	1990 ~ No Prayer for the Dying	4:44
8.	"Holy Smoke"	Harris, Dickinson	1990 ~ No Prayer for the Dying	3:49
9.	"The Clairvoyant"	Harris	1988 ~ Seventh Son of a Seventh Son	4:27
10.	"Can I Play With Madness"	Smith, Dickinson, Harris	1988 ~ Seventh Son of a Seventh Son	3:31
11.	"The Evil That Men Do"	Smith, Dickinson, Harris	1988 ~ Seventh Son of a Seventh Son	4:35
12.	"Heaven Can Wait"	Harris	1986 ~ Somewhere in Time	7:24
13.	"Wasted Years"	Smith	1986 ~ Somewhere in Time	5:06

Disc Two
No.	Title	Writer(s)	Original Album	Length
1.	"Rime of the Ancient Mariner" (Live in Long Beach, USA 1985)	Harris	1985 ~ Live After Death (1984 ~ Powerslave)	13:10
2.	"Running Free" (Live in Long Beach, USA 1985; single edit)	Harris, Di'Anno	1985 ~ Live After Death (1980 ~ Iron Maiden)	3:25
3.	"2 Minutes to Midnight"	Smith, Dickinson	1984 ~ Powerslave	6:04
4.	"Aces High"	Harris	1984 ~ Powerslave	4:31
5.	"Where Eagles Dare"	Harris	1983 ~ Piece of Mind	6:10
6.	"The Trooper"	Harris	1983 ~ Piece of Mind	4:11
7.	"The Number of the Beast"	Harris	1982 ~ The Number of the Beast	4:49
8.	"Run to the Hills"	Harris	1982 ~ The Number of the Beast	3:50
9.	"Hallowed Be Thy Name"	Harris	1982 ~ The Number of the Beast	7:10
10.	"Wrathchild"	Harris	1981 ~ Killers	2:54
11.	"Phantom of the Opera"	Harris	1980 ~ Iron Maiden	7:20
12.	"Sanctuary"	Harris, Murray, Di'Anno	1980 ~ Iron Maiden	3:13
13.	"Strange World" (Unreleased recording for The Soundhouse Tapes)	Harris	Previously unreleased (1980 ~ Iron Maiden)	5:45
14.	"Iron Maiden"	Harris	1979 ~ The Soundhouse Tapes (1980 ~ Iron Maiden)	3:57
Total length:				149:40

=== Limited edition vinyl ===
Side A
No.	Title	Writer(s)	Original Album	Length
1.	"Virus"	Harris, Gers, Murray, Bayley	New recording	6:30
2.	"Sign of the Cross"	Harris	1995 ~ The X Factor	11:17
3.	"Afraid to Shoot Strangers" (Live in Gothenburg, Sweden 1995)	Harris	Previously unreleased (1992 ~ Fear of the Dark)	6:40

Side B
No.	Title	Writer(s)	Original Album	Length
4.	"Man on the Edge"	Bayley, Gers	1995 ~ The X Factor	4:18
5.	"Be Quick or Be Dead"	Dickinson, Gers	1992 ~ Fear of the Dark	3:21
6.	"Fear of the Dark" (Live in Helsinki, Finland 1992)	Harris	1993 ~ A Real Live One (1992 ~ Fear of the Dark)	7:21
7.	"Holy Smoke"	Harris, Dickinson	1990 ~ No Prayer for the Dying	3:49
8.	"Bring Your Daughter... to the Slaughter"	Dickinson	1990 ~ No Prayer for the Dying	4:44

Side C
No.	Title	Writer(s)	Original Album	Length
1.	"Seventh Son of a Seventh Son"	Harris	1988 ~ Seventh Son of a Seventh Son	9:54
2.	"Can I Play With Madness"	Dickinson, Harris, Smith	1988 ~ Seventh Son of a Seventh Son	3:31
3.	"The Evil That Men Do"	Smith, Dickinson, Harris	1988 ~ Seventh Son of a Seventh Son	4:35
4.	"The Clairvoyant"	Harris	1988 ~ Seventh Son of a Seventh Son	4:27

Side D
No.	Title	Writer(s)	Original Album	Length
5.	"Heaven Can Wait"	Harris	1986 ~ Somewhere in Time	7:24
6.	"Wasted Years"	Smith	1986 ~ Somewhere in Time	5:06
7.	"2 Minutes to Midnight"	Smith, Dickinson	1984 ~ Powerslave	6:04
8.	"Running Free" (Live in Long Beach, USA 1985; single edit)	Harris, Di'Anno	1985 ~ Live After Death (1980 ~ Iron Maiden)	3:25

Side E
No.	Title	Writer(s)	Original Album	Length
1.	"Rime of the Ancient Mariner" (Live in Long Beach, USA 1985)	Harris	1985 ~ Live After Death (1984 ~ Powerslave)	13:10
2.	"Aces High"	Harris	1984 ~ Powerslave	4:31
3.	"Where Eagles Dare"	Harris	1983 ~ Piece of Mind	6:10
4.	"The Trooper"	Harris	1983 ~ Piece of Mind	4:11

Side F
No.	Title	Writer(s)	Original Album	Length
5.	"The Number of the Beast"	Harris	1982 ~ The Number of the Beast	4:49
6.	"Revelations" (Live in Dortmund, Germany 1985)	Dickinson	1985 ~ Live After Death (1983 ~ Piece of Mind)	6:11
7.	"The Prisoner"	Smith, Harris	1982 ~ The Number of the Beast	6:00
8.	"Run to the Hills"	Harris	1982 ~ The Number of the Beast	3:50
9.	"Hallowed Be Thy Name"	Harris	1982 ~ The Number of the Beast	7:10

Side G
No.	Title	Writer(s)	Original Album	Length
1.	"Wrathchild"	Harris	1981 ~ Killers	2:54
2.	"Killers"	Di'Anno, Harris	1981 ~ Killers	5:01
3.	"Remember Tomorrow"	Di'Anno, Harris	1980 ~ Iron Maiden	5:27
4.	"Phantom of the Opera"	Harris	1980 ~ Iron Maiden	7:20
5.	"Sanctuary"	Iron Maiden	1980 ~ Iron Maiden	3:13

Side H
No.	Title	Writer(s)	Original Album	Length
6.	"Prowler"	Harris	1979 ~ The Soundhouse Tapes (1980 ~ Iron Maiden)	4:17
7.	"Invasion"	Harris	1979 ~ The Soundhouse Tapes (1980 ~ Women in Uniform)	2:55
8.	"Strange World" (Unreleased recording for The Soundhouse Tapes)	Harris	Previously unreleased (1980 ~ Iron Maiden)	5:45
9.	"Iron Maiden"	Harris	1979 ~ The Soundhouse Tapes (1980 ~ Iron Maiden)	3:57
Total length:				189:17

== Charts ==
Chart (1996)	Peak position
Australian Albums (ARIA)	58
Austrian Albums (Ö3 Austria)	41
Belgian Albums (Ultratop Flanders)	28
Belgian Albums (Ultratop Wallonia)	39
Dutch Albums (Album Top 100)	25
Finnish Albums (Suomen virallinen lista)	8
German Albums (Offizielle Top 100)	42
Hungarian Albums (MAHASZ)	21
Italian Albums (FIMI)	22
Japanese Albums (Oricon)	26
New Zealand Albums (RMNZ)	37
Official Charts Company	19
Swedish Albums (Sverigetopplistan)	11
UK Albums (OCC)	16

== Certifications ==
Region	Certification	Certified units/sales
Argentina (CAPIF)	Platinum	60,000^{^}
Brazil (Pro-Música Brasil)	Gold	100,000^{*}
Finland (Musiikkituottajat)	Gold	22,261
Sweden (GLF)	Platinum	100,000^{^}
United Kingdom (BPI)	Gold	100,000^{^}
^{*} Sales figures based on certification alone.^{^} Shipments figures based on certification alone.
