= Brave New World (Iron Maiden album) =

Studio album by Iron Maiden
- Released: 29 May 2000
- Recorded: 1999 – April 2000
- Studio: Guillaume Tell (Paris)
- Genre: Heavy metal
- Length: 66:57
- Label: EMI
- Producer: Kevin Shirley

Iron Maiden chronology
Ed Hunter (1999)	Brave New World (2000)	Rock in Rio (2002)

Singles from Brave New World
- 1. "The Wicker Man" Released: 8 May 2000; 2. "Out of the Silent Planet" Released: 23 October 2000

Brave New World is the twelfth studio album by English heavy metal band Iron Maiden, released on 29 May 2000. It was their first studio release since the return of longtime lead singer Bruce Dickinson (who left in 1993) and guitarist Adrian Smith (who left in 1990) in 1999, as well as the band's first studio recording as a six-piece, as Janick Gers, who replaced Smith in 1990, remained with the band.

The album artwork and title song are references to the novel of the same name written by Aldous Huxley. The upper half of the artwork was created by Derek Riggs, with the bottom half by digital artist Steve Stone.

The songs "The Wicker Man" and "Out of the Silent Planet" were both released as singles. The promotional radio release of "The Wicker Man" featured extra vocals in the chorus not present in any other versions of the song.

The Brave New World Tour was the tour in support of the album, during which the show at Rock in Rio was recorded and later released as a live album and video.

Brave New World peaked at No. 7 in the UK Albums Chart, and has since been certified Gold. In the United States, it debuted at No. 39 on the Billboard 200, and registered over 307,000 sales on the Nielsen SoundScan system in 2008.

== Songs, composition and live performances ==
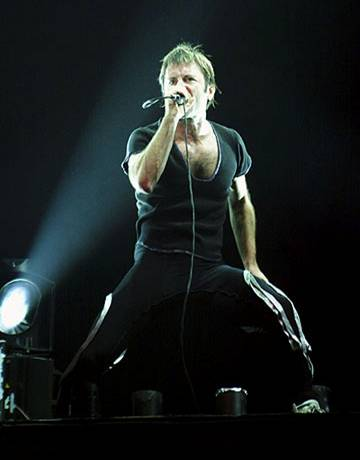
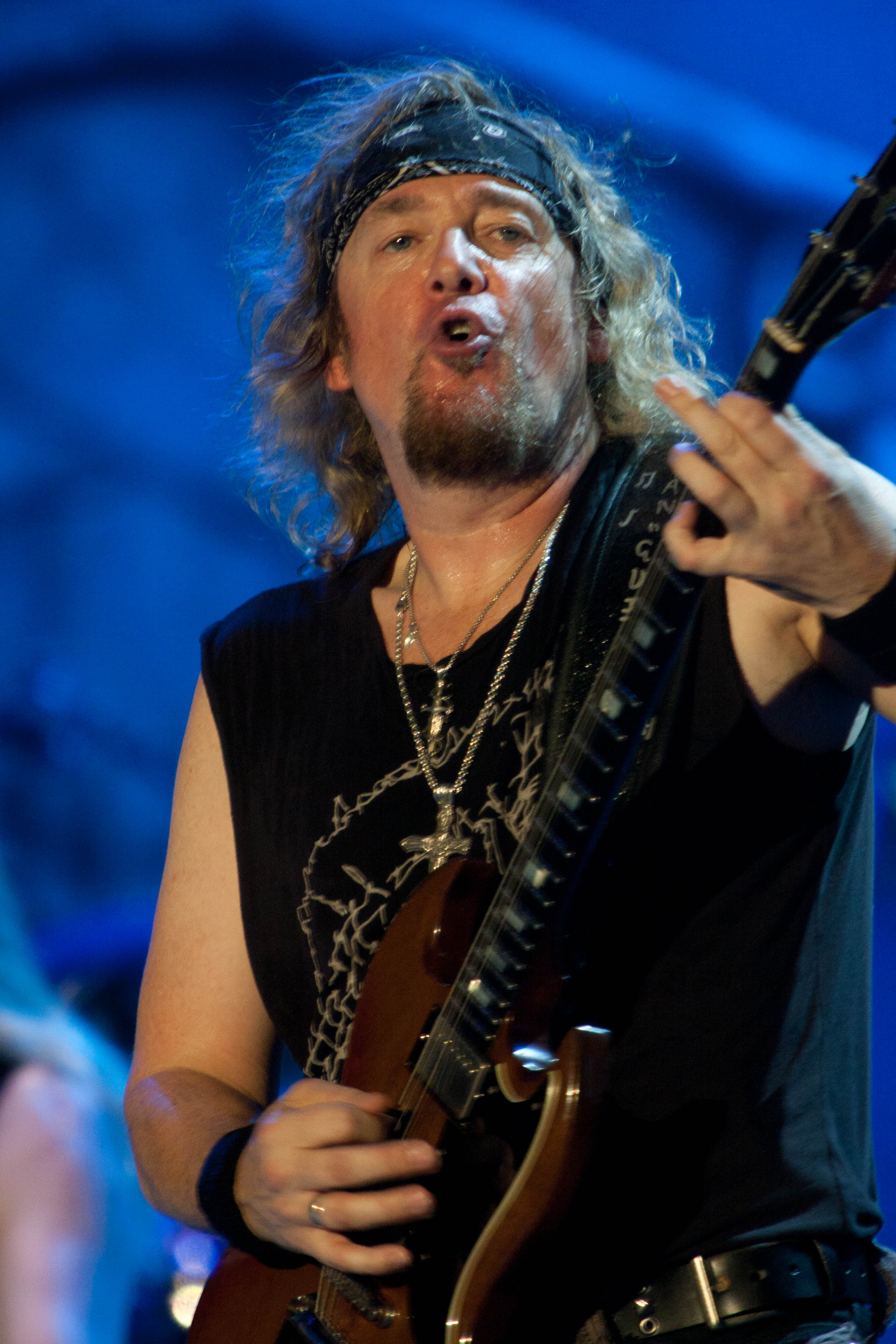
Brave New World marked the return of vocalist Bruce Dickinson (left) and guitarist Adrian Smith (right).

Most of the songs were written before The Ed Hunter Tour and were later recorded at Guillaume Tell Studios, Paris. It was the first album the band would record with producer Kevin Shirley, and the first that they would record live in the studio.

According to an interview with Adrian Smith, "The Nomad", "Dream of Mirrors", and "The Mercenary" were originally written for 1998's Virtual XI, and former vocalist Blaze Bayley claimed to have provided some lyrics for "Dream of Mirrors", but was not credited. According to Steve Harris, work had also begun on "Blood Brothers" during that period, but it was not completed at the time.

"Brave New World" was the release's only song to reappear on the Dance of Death World Tour, the next tour in support of a studio release. None of the tracks from the album were played during the A Matter of Life and Death Tour, although many returned throughout The Final Frontier World Tour, with "The Wicker Man", "Ghost of the Navigator", the title track, and "Blood Brothers" being played during the 2010 leg. "Blood Brothers" returned for The Book of Souls World Tour and "The Wicker Man" also returned for the Legacy of the Beast World Tour.

The song "Blood Brothers", written by Steve Harris for his late father, was dedicated to Ronnie James Dio throughout the 2010 leg of The Final Frontier World Tour, following his death on 16 May. On the 2011 leg of the tour starting in Australia, "Blood Brothers" would then be dedicated to the victims and friends and family of the band members and audience who were affected by the 2011 Christchurch earthquake on 22 February. As the tour progressed, the song was also dedicated to the victims of the 2011 Tōhoku earthquake and tsunami, as well as the revolts in Egypt and Libya and, later, the victims of the 2011 Norway attacks. A live performance of the song from 2012's En Vivo! was nominated for a Grammy Award for Best Hard Rock/Metal Performance on 6 December 2012.

== Critical reception ==
Professional ratings
Review scores
Source	Rating
AllMusic	3.5/5 stars
Blabbermouth.net	5/10
BW&BK	10/10
Classic Rock	4/5 stars
Kerrang!	5/5 stars
Metal Hammer	9/10
NME	4/10
Sputnikmusic	4.5/5 stars

Reviews for the album were generally positive. Critics were especially warm towards the return of Bruce Dickinson and Adrian Smith to the band compared to the previous two releases which featured Blaze Bayley on vocals. Kerrang! described it as "truly towering. Majestic. Bombastic. Titanic. So gloriously in-yer-face you can almost feel its hot breath up your nostrils." Sputnikmusic described it as "one of the band's top albums; alongside the likes of Powerslave, Somewhere in Time, and Piece of Mind" and "definitely the easiest album to get into since the band's glory days." Classic Rock stated that, while "it may not take too many strides forward," it "certainly succeeds in reeling back the years to Iron Maiden's heyday."

AllMusic were slightly more critical of the album, describing it as "no Number of the Beast". The website went on to say that "as comeback albums go, its excellence was undeniable"; likewise, they gave the album a positive rating.

NME were extremely unfavourable towards the release, arguing that the band's past "dismissal of the outside world, which kept them safe all those years, now leaves them looking rather obsolete". The magazine also compared the band to more contemporary acts such as Korn and Slipknot and felt Iron Maiden were "no longer the high priests of the black arts, and seem almost innocent by comparison". Blabbermouth.net were also negative, stating that the band sound "tired and uninspired", and concluding that "[Brave New World] will fail to leave a lasting mark on the face of the current metal scene."

The album was named the 8th greatest album of the 2000s by Decibel. In 2020, it was named one of the 20 best metal albums of 2000 by Metal Hammer magazine. In 2023 Metal Hammer named it the 15th best metal album of the 2000s. In 2025 Loudwire named it one of the top 50 metal albums of the 2000s.

== Track listing ==
Brave New World track listing
No.	Title	Writer(s)	Length
1.	"The Wicker Man"	Adrian Smith; Steve Harris; Bruce Dickinson	4:35
2.	"Ghost of the Navigator"	Janick Gers; Dickinson; Harris	6:50
3.	"Brave New World"	Dave Murray; Harris; Dickinson	6:18
4.	"Blood Brothers"	Harris	7:14
5.	"The Mercenary"	Gers; Harris	4:42
6.	"Dream of Mirrors"	Gers; Harris	9:21
7.	"The Fallen Angel"	Smith; Harris	4:00
8.	"The Nomad"	Murray; Harris	9:06
9.	"Out of the Silent Planet"	Gers; Dickinson; Harris	6:25
10.	"The Thin Line Between Love & Hate"	Murray; Harris	8:26
Total length:			66:57

== Personnel ==
Production and performance credits are adapted from the album liner notes.

=== Iron Maiden ===
- Bruce Dickinson – vocals
- Dave Murray – guitars
- Adrian Smith – guitars
- Janick Gers – guitars
- Steve Harris – bass guitar, keyboards
- Nicko McBrain – drums

=== Additional personnel ===
- Kevin "Caveman" Shirley – production, engineering, mixing
- Steve Harris – co-production
- Denis Caribaux – second engineer
- Nicolas Meyer – assistant engineer
- Rory Romano – assistant engineer
- Jeff Bova – orchestration on "Blood Brothers" and "The Nomad"
- George Marino – mastering
- Derek Riggs – sleeve illustration
- Steve Stone – sleeve illustration
- Peacock – sleeve design, sleeve concept
- Dean Karr – photography

== Charts ==
Chart (2000)	Peak position
Australian Albums (ARIA)	33
Austrian Albums (Ö3 Austria)	10
Belgian Albums (Ultratop Flanders)	12
Belgian Albums (Ultratop Wallonia)	29
Canada Top Albums/CDs (RPM)	23
Dutch Albums (Album Top 100)	16
Finnish Albums (Suomen virallinen lista)	2
French Albums (SNEP)	3
German Albums (Offizielle Top 100)	3
Hungarian Albums (MAHASZ)	4
Italian Albums (FIMI)	3
Japanese Albums (Oricon)	13
Norwegian Albums (VG-lista)	4
Scottish Albums (Official Charts)	7
Spanish Albums (AFYVE)	8
Swedish Albums (Sverigetopplistan)	1
Swiss Albums (Schweizer Hitparade)	9
UK Albums (Official Charts)	7
UK Rock & Metal Albums (Official Charts)	1
US Billboard 200	39

Chart (2010)	Peak position
Swiss Albums (Schweizer Hitparade)	72

Chart (2021)	Peak position
Portuguese Albums (AFP)	27

== Certifications ==
Region	Certification	Certified units/sales
Brazil (Pro-Música Brasil)	Gold	100,000^{*}
Canada (Music Canada)	Gold	50,000^{^}
Finland (Musiikkituottajat)	Gold	16'316
Germany (BVMI)	Gold	150,000^{^}
Italy (FIMI)	Gold	70,000
Spain (Promusicae)	Platinum	100,000^{^}
Poland (ZPAV)	Gold	35,000^{*}
Sweden (GLF)	Gold	40,000^{^}
United Kingdom (BPI)	Gold	100,000^{^}
^{*} Sales figures based on certification alone.^{^} Shipments figures based on certification alone.
