= Virtual XI =

Studio album by Iron Maiden
- Released: 23 March 1998
- Recorded: 1997 – February 1998
- Studios: Barnyard (Essex, England)
- Genre: Heavy metal
- Length: 53:22
- Label: EMI
- Producers: Steve Harris; Nigel Green

Iron Maiden chronology
Best of the Beast (1996)	Virtual XI (1998)	A Real Live Dead One (1998)

Singles from Virtual XI
- 1. "The Angel and the Gambler" Released: 9 March 1998; 2. "Futureal" Released: 28 July 1998

Virtual XI (pronounced "Virtual Eleven") is the eleventh studio album by English heavy metal band Iron Maiden, released on 23 March 1998. It is the band's second and final album with Blaze Bayley on vocals, as well as the final album as a five piece, as Bruce Dickinson and Adrian Smith would later return to the band, while Janick Gers who replaced Smith remained in the band. It also marks the first album to utilise a slightly modified logo, with the letters R, M, and N the same size as the other letters as opposed to them being extended. The band used the updated version of their logo for their next few albums; it was used until The Final Frontier, released in 2010.

== Background ==
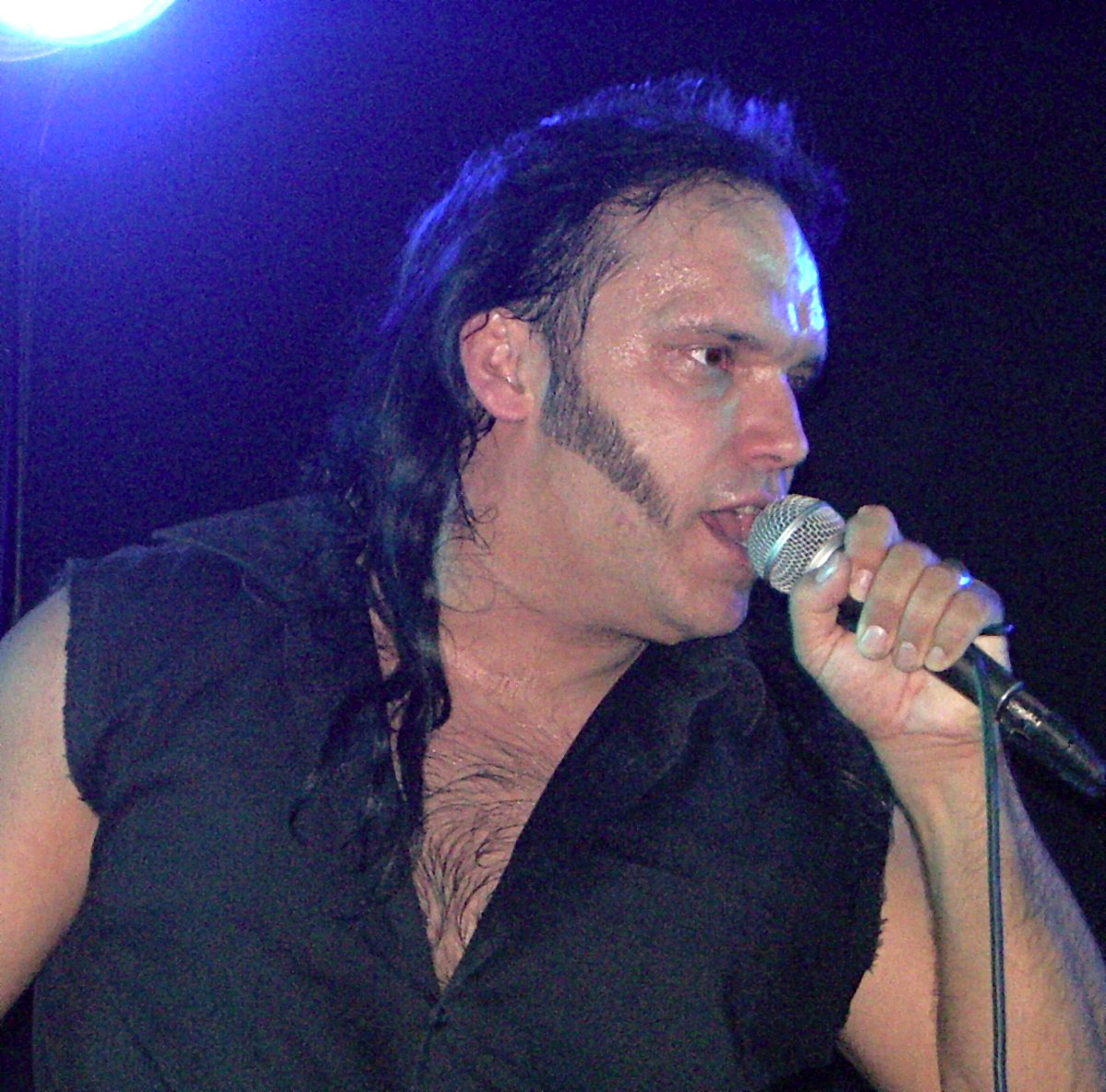
Virtual XI is the second and final Iron Maiden album with vocalist Blaze Bayley.

Virtual XI's title is tied in with two extra-musical events: the release of the band's computer game, Ed Hunter, and the fact that the 1998 FIFA World Cup would be taking place in June of that year. Harris explains, "We figure our fans are pretty much the same as we are, with pretty much the same interests, so we thought, 'It's World Cup year in '98. Let's get the football involved in the new album.' And we were already working on a computer game at that time, so we thought, 'Well, let's bring that element into things, too.'" Prior to the album's release, the band organised a publicity tour in which they held football matches across Europe with "guest musicians and pro-footballers from the UK."

While most of the artwork in the album's booklet was taken from the Ed Hunter game, the cover was created by Melvyn Grant. According to Grant, he was asked to design something related to virtual reality, but was later asked to alter the artwork by adding a football game, the band then having decided to link the release with the World Cup. This was also the first album to feature the band's new alternate logo, with the extended ends of the "R", "M", and both "N's" removed. This variant would be used on all future studio albums, live albums (with the exception of Flight 666 and Maiden England '88), and singles up until The Final Frontier. Starting with The Book of Souls, the band's 16th studio album, the original logo was reused.

For this album some keyboard parts were performed by band founder/bassist Steve Harris whereas on previous albums all the keyboard parts had been handled by Harris' bass technician, Michael Kenney.

As with their previous world tour, several US shows on the Virtual XI World Tour had to be cancelled as Bayley had vocal issues; however, the official reason given for the cancellation was that he was suffering from a severe allergic reaction to pollen.

This would be the second and final studio album to feature Blaze Bayley, as he resigned from Iron Maiden following a February 1999 announcement that Bruce Dickinson and Adrian Smith, who had left in 1993 and 1990 respectively, would be returning to the line-up.

== Songs ==
Stylistically, Bayley states that Virtual XI "was a more upbeat album [in comparison to its predecessor], because we'd survived the X-Factor... we were a band and, I felt, we were on our way." According to Harris, "Futureal", whose lyrics were written by Bayley, is "about being locked up in virtual reality", and describes it as "a quite straightforward rocker but done Maiden style." Regarding the album's second single, manager Rod Smallwood claims that he "had a bit of a battle with Steve" over releasing "Futureal" instead of "The Angel and the Gambler" as the album's lead single, but "Steve put his foot down." According to Harris, "The Angel and the Gambler" "is the story of these two characters, one guy who's been a bit of a rogue, a fly by night, and an angel who gets sent down to try and put him right – except he isn't having it."

Of the album's remaining songs, "Lightning Strikes Twice" is, according to Harris, "a never say never-type song ... It's a very positive, hopeful song which you can read in lots of different ways." "The Clansman" was inspired by the film Braveheart which Harris states is "about what it's like to belong to a community that you try and build up and then you have to fight to stop having it taken away from you". Speaking about "When Two Worlds Collide", Harris says, "Lyrically, I think Blaze was trying to write about the different sort of worlds he's lived in and maybe about how his world has had to change and adapt to the world of being Iron Maiden's singer." "The Educated Fool" is, according to Harris, about "growing older and everyone expecting you to be wiser but how somehow the older you get and the more you know, the less you have the answers for any of it." "Don't Look to the Eyes of a Stranger" is inspired by Steve Harris' observation, from a parent's point of view, that "every stranger is a possible threat", while "Como Estais Amigos" is a tribute to the soldiers on both sides in the Falklands War; its lyrics were written by Bayley and the music by Gers, making this the first Iron Maiden album where Steve Harris did not write or co-write the final song.

After Bruce Dickinson rejoined the band, Iron Maiden continued to play both "Futureal" and "The Clansman" in concert. While "Futureal" was only performed live in 1999, "The Clansman" appeared in the group's setlists until 2003; it was also used during 2018's Legacy of the Beast tour. Live recordings of both songs with Dickinson on vocals have been released officially: "Futureal" was issued as a B-side to "The Wicker Man" single, while performances of "The Clansman" can be found on the live albums Rock in Rio and Nights of the Dead. The Rock in Rio recording was also included on Iron Maiden's 2011 compilation CD From Fear to Eternity.

Four songs that were written during the sessions for Virtual XI ended up on its follow-up Brave New World: "Nomad", "Dream of Mirrors", "Mercenary" and "Blood Brothers".

Blaze Bayley recorded solo versions of "Futureal" and "When Two Worlds Collide" on his live album As Live as It Gets. He regularly performs the album's closing song "Como Estais Amigos" in concert, a song which never appeared on any Iron Maiden setlist.

The track "The Clansman" was sampled by singer Brandy in her song "I Tried".

== Critical reception ==
Professional ratings
Review scores
Source	Rating
AllMusic	2/5 stars
Collector's Guide to Heavy Metal	0/10
Sputnikmusic	3.5/5
Rock Hard	8.5/10
Metal.de	6/10

Virtual XI was met with mixed to negative reviews from critics. Stephen Thomas Erlewine of AllMusic commented that "on the surface, there's nothing terribly wrong with the record, as it delivers all the crunching riffs and demonic horror of their best records. The problem is that there's nothing memorable about the hooks, riffs, or songs, and there's little visceral energy to the music or production. As a result, it sounds lifeless to all but the most devoted fan." He also stated that Blaze Bayley is "a competent but faceless vocalist".

== Track listing ==
Virtual XI track listing
No.	Title	Writer(s)	Length
1.	"Futureal"	Steve Harris; Blaze Bayley	3:00
2.	"The Angel and the Gambler"	Harris	9:51
3.	"Lightning Strikes Twice"	Dave Murray; Harris	4:49
4.	"The Clansman"	Harris	9:06
5.	"When Two Worlds Collide"	Murray; Bayley; Harris	6:13
6.	"The Educated Fool"	Harris	6:46
7.	"Don't Look to the Eyes of a Stranger"	Harris	8:11
8.	"Como Estais Amigos"	Janick Gers; Bayley	5:26
Total length:			53:22

Japanese limited edition bonus disc
No.	Title	Writer(s)	Length
1.	"Blood on the World's Hands" (live)	Harris	6:05
2.	"The Aftermath" (live)	Bayley; Gers; Harris	6:43
Total length:			12:48

== Personnel ==
Production and performance credits are adapted from the album's liner notes.

=== Iron Maiden ===
- Blaze Bayley – vocals
- Dave Murray – guitar
- Janick Gers – guitar
- Steve Harris – bass guitar, keyboards on "The Clansman", "The Angel and the Gambler" and "Don't Look to the Eyes of a Stranger", production, mixing
- Nicko McBrain – drums

=== Additional musician ===
- Michael Kenney – keyboards on all tracks except "The Clansman", "The Angel and the Gambler" and "Don't Look to the Eyes of a Stranger"

=== Production ===
- Nigel Green – producer, engineer, mixing
- Mick McKenna – assistant engineer
- Simon Heyworth – mastering
- Melvyn Grant – sleeve illustration
- Synthetic Dimensions – sleeve design, 3D imagery
- Simon Fowler – photography
- George Chin – photography
- Ross Halfin – photography

== Charts ==
Chart (1998)	Peak position
Australian Albums (ARIA)	98
Austrian Albums (Ö3 Austria)	24
Belgian Albums (Ultratop Flanders)	23
Belgian Albums (Ultratop Wallonia)	44
Canada Top Albums/CDs (RPM)	60
Dutch Albums (Album Top 100)	26
Finnish Albums (Suomen virallinen lista)	6
French Albums (SNEP)	12
German Albums (Offizielle Top 100)	16
Hungarian Albums (MAHASZ)	10
Italian Albums (FIMI)	7
Japanese Albums (Oricon)	19
Norwegian Albums (VG-lista)	28
Scottish Albums (Official Charts)	25
Spanish Albums (AFYVE)	10
Swedish Albums (Sverigetopplistan)	16
Swiss Albums (Schweizer Hitparade)	39
UK Albums (Official Charts)	16
UK Rock & Metal Albums (Official Charts)	1
US Billboard 200	124

Chart (2017)	Peak position
Italian Albums (FIMI)	58
Spanish Albums (Promusicae)	92

== Certifications ==
Region	Certification	Certified units/sales
United Kingdom (BPI)	Silver	60,000^{‡}
^{‡} Sales+streaming figures based on certification alone.
