= Futureal =

Single by Iron Maiden

from the album Virtual XI
- B-side: "The Evil That Men Do (live); "Man on the Edge" (live); "The Angel and the Gambler" (video)
- Released: 28 July 1998
- Recorded: 1997
- Genre: Heavy metal
- Length: 3:00
- Label: EMI
- Songwriters: Steve Harris; Blaze Bayley

Iron Maiden singles chronology
"The Angel and the Gambler" (1998)	"Futureal" (1998)	"The Wicker Man" (2000)

Derek Riggs poster

"Futureal" is a single from the Iron Maiden album Virtual XI, released in 1998. It is the last single by the band to feature vocalist Blaze Bayley, as he parted ways with the band in February 1999.

== Synopsis ==
The song was voted as one of the most popular Iron Maiden songs of all time in a fan poll taken during the making of the Ed Hunter album and video game. The cover of the single depicts band mascot Eddie, in CG form, as the cyborg form he had on Somewhere in Time.

A 1999 live recording of this song appears on the band's next single release, "The Wicker Man".

The single came with a poster by Derek Riggs.

== Track listing ==
No.	Title	Writer(s)	Length
1.	"Futureal"	Blaze Bayley; Steve Harris	3:00
2.	"The Evil That Men Do" (live – Kåren, Gothenburg, 1 November 1995)	Bruce Dickinson; Harris; Adrian Smith	4:20
3.	"Man on the Edge" (live – Kåren, Gothenburg, 1 November 1995)	Bayley; Janick Gers	4:09
4.	"The Angel and the Gambler" (video)	Harris	9:51

== Personnel ==
- Blaze Bayley – vocals
- Dave Murray – guitar
- Janick Gers – guitar
- Steve Harris – bass
- Nicko McBrain – drums
