= The Wicker Man (song) =

2000 single by Iron Maiden

Single by Iron Maiden

from the album Brave New World
- B-side: "Futureal" (live); "Man on the Edge" (live); "Powerslave" (live); "Killers" (live)
- Released: 8 May 2000
- Length: 4:35 (album version); 4:16 (radio edit)
- Label: EMI
- Songwriters: Adrian Smith; Steve Harris; Bruce Dickinson
- Producers: Kevin Shirley; Steve Harris

Iron Maiden singles chronology
"Futureal" (1998)	"The Wicker Man" (2000)	"Out of the Silent Planet" (2000)

Music video
- "The Wicker Man" on YouTube

CD 2 clear cover

12-inch picture disc LP

"The Wicker Man" is a song by English heavy metal band Iron Maiden. It was released on 8 May 2000 as the first single from their twelfth studio album, Brave New World (2000). It preceded the release of Brave New World by three weeks. It is also the first single by the band since 1989's single "Infinite Dreams" to feature "The Trooper"-era lineup with vocalist Bruce Dickinson and guitarist Adrian Smith returning to the band in 1999. It was co-written by Smith, Dickinson and Steve Harris. It was co-produced by Kevin Shirley and Harris. The title is inspired by the British cult film of the same name. The song should not be confused with "Wicker Man" from Dickinson's solo career, the lyrics of which are more closely themed around the film. The latter song can be found on the two-disc edition of The Best of Bruce Dickinson.

== Composition ==
According to Dickinson, 'The Wicker Man' initially started off as a riff that Adrian Smith was "bouncing around with". Dickinson thought that the riff sounded good and he began to add a catchy melody to the song. Then Steve Harris began to play along to the riff. Dickinson stated that the song was written without even trying to get a single-length track. It was also the first song that the band rehearsed together since the return of Dickinson and Smith. Dickinson said the process of writing the lyrics attempted to get "the same vibe I get when I stand onstage in front of all these people and they start singing and chanting with you".

The radio version of the song differs from the album track, with the chorus' first and third line "Your time will come" followed by the line, "Thy will be done", and the last line is followed by "Don't turn, don't run." This is the case for every chorus except for the third chorus in which the third line is followed by "I'll be the one" and the fourth line is followed by "Burn on the sun." This version is considered extremely rare.

The single's cover art was by Mark Wilkinson, after a piece by the famed artist Derek Riggs was rejected. This was the last piece Riggs would create for Iron Maiden, until Flight 666, reasoning that they were too hard to work with. This art work was used for the picture vinyl disc and various minor pressings.

In 2001, the song was nominated for a Grammy Award in the category "Best Metal Performance" but lost to "Elite" by Deftones.

This song was also included as a playable song in game Rock Band Blitz.

From 2011 to 2018, the Washington Capitals of the National Hockey League used a portion of "The Wicker Man" as their goal celebration song.

=== Limited editions ===
A limited edition of "The Wicker Man" was also released. The limited edition contains two CDs and a double-faced poster, as well as a selection of live songs recorded during the Ed Hunter Tour. The European release of the single also contains a beermat. CD 1 has a picture of the band on the cover of the CD. the same as the single cover; CD 2 is clear with a picture of the "Wicker Man" on the CD. The 12-inch LP picture disc has the "Wicker Man" on the A-side and the people with animal masks on the B-side.

== Track listings ==
Standard edition

1. "The Wicker Man" (Adrian Smith, Steve Harris, Bruce Dickinson) – 4:35
2. "Futureal" (live – Helsinki Ice Hall, Finland 15 September 1999) (Harris, Blaze Bayley) – 2:58
3. "Man on the Edge" (live – Filaforum, Milano, Italy 23 September 1999) (Bayley, Janick Gers) – 4:37
4. "The Wicker Man" (video) (Smith, Harris, Dickinson) – 4:35

Limited edition disc 1

1. "The Wicker Man" (Smith, Harris, Dickinson) – 4:35
2. "Man on the Edge" (live – Filaforum, Milano, Italy 23 September 1999) (Bayley, Gers) – 4:37
3. "Powerslave" (live – Palau Olimpico, Barcelona, Spain 25 September 1999) (Dickinson) – 7:11
4. "The Wicker Man" (video) (Smith, Harris, Dickinson) – 4:35

Limited edition disc 2

1. "The Wicker Man" (Smith, Harris, Dickinson) – 4:35
2. "Futureal" (live – Helsinki Ice Hall, Finland 15 September 1999) (Harris, Bayley) – 2:58
3. "Killers" (live – Ahoy, Rotterdam, Netherlands 10 September 1999) (Harris, Paul Di'Anno) – 4:28
4. "Futureal (live video)" (Harris, Bayley) – 2:58

12-inch picture disc LP

A1. "The Wicker Man" (Smith, Harris, Dickinson) – 4:35
B1. "Powerslave" (live – Palau Olimpico, Barcelona, Spain 25 September 1999) (Dickinson) – 7:11
B2. "Killers" (live – Ahoy, Rotterdam, Netherlands 10 September 1999) (Harris, Di'Anno) – 4:28

== Personnel ==
Production credits are adapted from the CD and picture disc covers.

Iron Maiden

- Bruce Dickinson – vocals
- Dave Murray – guitar
- Adrian Smith – guitar
- Janick Gers – guitar
- Steve Harris – bass, co-producer
- Nicko McBrain – drums

Production

- Kevin Shirley – producer, mixing (except "Killers", "Powerslave")
- Doug Hall – mixing ("Killers", "Powerslave")
- George Marino – mastering ("The Wicker Man")
- Simon Heyworth – mastering (except "The Wicker Man")
- Johnny Burke – video footage
- Mark Wilkinson – sleeve illustration

== Charts ==
=== Weekly charts ===
Weekly chart performance for "The Wicker Man"
Chart (2000)	Peak position
Canada (Nielsen SoundScan) "Wicker Man Pt. 1" (import)	4
Europe (Eurochart Hot 100)	19
Finland (Suomen virallinen lista)	11
France (SNEP)	39
Germany (GfK)	38
Greece (IFPI)	1
Ireland (IRMA)	35
Italy (FIMI)	3
Netherlands (Single Top 100)	45
Norway (VG-lista)	9
Scotland Singles (OCC)	9
Spain (PROMUSICAE)	5
Sweden (Sverigetopplistan)	5
Switzerland (Schweizer Hitparade)	83
UK Singles (OCC)	9
UK Rock & Metal (OCC)	1
US Mainstream Rock (Billboard)	19

=== Year-end charts ===
Year-end chart performance for "The Wicker Man"
Chart (2000)	Position
US Mainstream Rock Tracks (Billboard)	67

== Release history ==
Region	Date	Format(s)	Label(s)	Ref.
United Kingdom	8 May 2000	12-inch vinyl; CD	EMI	
United States	15 May 2000	Mainstream rock; active rock radio	Portrait; Columbia	
Japan	31 May 2000	CD	EMI	
