= Eddie's Head =

Box set by Iron Maiden
- Released: 1 December 1998
- Label: Raw Power Records

Iron Maiden chronology
A Real Live Dead One (1998)	Eddie's Head (1998)	Ed Hunter (1999)

Professional ratings
Review scores
Source	Rating
AllMusic	4/5 stars

Eddie's Head is a box set by Iron Maiden, in the shape of the head of their mascot, Eddie and containing their first 12 albums remastered, from Iron Maiden to Live at Donington, each with bonus multimedia material, plus a limited In Profile CD. The spine of each CD has a part of the original cover art for Iron Maiden.

This set has been out of print for years, prompting the price to skyrocket. However, all of the individual CDs that make up the box set have all been reissued on their own, making them easily attainable.

== Track listing ==
=== Disc: 1 (Iron Maiden) ===
No.	Title	Writer(s)	Length
1.	"Prowler"	Steve Harris	3:56
2.	"Sanctuary" (not on original release)	Paul Di'Anno, Steve Harris, Dave Murray	3:16
3.	"Remember Tomorrow"	Di'Anno, Harris	5:28
4.	"Running Free"	Di'Anno, Harris	3:17
5.	"Phantom of the Opera"	Harris	7:07
6.	"Transylvania"	Harris	4:19
7.	"Strange World"	Harris	5:32
8.	"Charlotte the Harlot"	Murray	4:12
9.	"Iron Maiden"	Harris	3:38

=== Disc: 2 (Killers) ===
No.	Title	Writer(s)	Length
1.	"The Ides of March"	Harris	1:45
2.	"Wrathchild"	Harris	2:54
3.	"Murders in the Rue Morgue"	Harris	4:19
4.	"Another Life"	Harris	3:22
5.	"Genghis Khan"	Harris	3:06
6.	"Innocent Exile"	Harris	3:53
7.	"Killers"	Di'Anno, Harris	5:01
8.	"Prodigal Son"	Harris	6:11
9.	"Purgatory"	Harris	3:21
10.	"Twilight Zone" (not on original release)	Harris, Murray	2:34
11.	"Drifter"	Harris	4:48

=== Disc: 3 (The Number of the Beast) ===
No.	Title	Writer(s)	Length
1.	"Invaders"	Harris	3:24
2.	"Children of the Damned"	Harris	4:35
3.	"The Prisoner"	Harris, Adrian Smith	6:04
4.	"22 Acacia Avenue"	Smith	6:37
5.	"The Number of the Beast"	Harris	4:48
6.	"Run to the Hills"	Harris	3:54
7.	"Gangland"	Clive Burr, Smith	3:48
8.	"Total Eclipse" (not on original release)	Burr, Harris, Murray	4:25
9.	"Hallowed Be Thy Name"	Harris	7:14

=== Disc: 4 (Piece of Mind) ===
No.	Title	Writer(s)	Length
1.	"Where Eagles Dare"	Harris	6:10
2.	"Revelations"	Bruce Dickinson	6:48
3.	"Flight of Icarus"	Dickinson, Smith	3:51
4.	"Die With Your Boots On"	Dickinson, Harris, Smith	5:28
5.	"The Trooper"	Harris	4:10
6.	"Still Life"	Harris, Murray	4:53
7.	"Quest for Fire"	Harris	3:41
8.	"Sun and Steel"	Dickinson, Smith	3:26
9.	"To Tame a Land"	Harris	7:27

=== Disc: 5 (Powerslave) ===
No.	Title	Writer(s)	Length
1.	"Aces High"	Harris	4:29
2.	"2 Minutes to Midnight"	Dickinson, Smith	5:59
3.	"Losfer Words (Big 'Orra)"	Harris	4:12
4.	"Flash of the Blade"	Dickinson	4:02
5.	"The Duellists"	Harris	6:06
6.	"Back in the Village"	Dickinson, Smith	5:20
7.	"Powerslave"	Dickinson	6:47
8.	"Rime of the Ancient Mariner"	Harris	13:34

=== Disc: 6 (Live After Death) ===
No.	Title	Writer(s)	Length
1.	"Churchill's Speech"	Winston Churchill	1:32
2.	"Aces High"	Harris	4:14
3.	"2 Minutes to Midnight"	Dickinson, Smith	5:16
4.	"The Trooper"	Harris	4:07
5.	"Revelations"	Dickinson	5:59
6.	"Flight of Icarus"	Dickinson, Smith	3:30
7.	"Rime of the Ancient Mariner"	Harris	14:06
8.	"Powerslave"	Dickinson	6:54
9.	"The Number of the Beast"	Harris	4:49
10.	"Hallowed Be Thy Name"	Harris	7:14
11.	"Iron Maiden"	Harris	4:02
12.	"Run to the Hills"	Harris	3:50
13.	"Running Free"	Di'Anno, Harris	4:08

=== Disc: 7 (Live After Death) ===
No.	Title	Writer(s)	Length
1.	"Wrathchild"	Harris	2:58
2.	"22 Acacia Avenue"	Harris, Smith	4:58
3.	"Children of the Damned"	Harris	4:21
4.	"Die With Your Boots On"	Dickinson, Harris, Smith	5:39
5.	"Phantom of the Opera"	Harris	7:01

=== Disc: 8 (Somewhere in Time) ===
No.	Title	Writer(s)	Length
1.	"Caught Somewhere in Time"	Harris	7:25
2.	"Wasted Years"	Smith	5:07
3.	"Sea of Madness"	Smith	5:42
4.	"Heaven Can Wait"	Harris	7:21
5.	"The Loneliness of the Long Distance Runner"	Harris	6:31
6.	"Stranger in a Strange Land"	Smith	5:44
7.	"Déjà Vu"	Harris, Murray	4:56
8.	"Alexander the Great"	Harris	8:37

=== Disc: 9 (Seventh Son of a Seventh Son) ===
No.	Title	Writer(s)	Length
1.	"Moonchild"	Dickinson, Smith	5:39
2.	"Infinite Dreams"	Harris	6:09
3.	"Can I Play with Madness"	Dickinson, Harris, Smith	3:31
4.	"The Evil That Men Do"	Dickinson, Harris, Smith	4:34
5.	"Seventh Son of a Seventh Son"	Harris	9:53
6.	"The Prophecy"	Harris, Murray	5:05
7.	"The Clairvoyant"	Harris	4:27
8.	"Only the Good Die Young"	Dickinson, Harris	4:41

=== Disc: 10 (No Prayer for the Dying) ===
No.	Title	Writer(s)	Length
1.	"Tailgunner"	Dickinson, Harris	4:15
2.	"Holy Smoke"	Dickinson, Harris	3:49
3.	"No Prayer for the Dying"	Harris	4:23
4.	"Public Enema Number One"	Dickinson, Murray	4:13
5.	"Fates Warning"	Harris, Murray	4:12
6.	"The Assassin"	Harris	4:35
7.	"Run Silent Run Deep"	Dickinson, Harris	4:35
8.	"Hooks in You"	Dickinson, Smith	4:08
9.	"Bring Your Daughter... to the Slaughter"	Dickinson	4:45
10.	"Mother Russia"	Harris	5:32

=== Disc: 11 (Fear of the Dark) ===
No.	Title	Writer(s)	Length
1.	"Be Quick or Be Dead"	Dickinson, Janick Gers	3:24
2.	"From Here to Eternity"	Harris	3:38
3.	"Afraid to Shoot Strangers"	Harris	6:56
4.	"Fear is the Key"	Dickinson, Gers	5:35
5.	"Childhood's End"	Harris	4:40
6.	"Wasting Love"	Dickinson, Gers	5:50
7.	"The Fugitive"	Harris	4:54
8.	"Chains of Misery"	Dickinson, Murray	3:37
9.	"The Apparition"	Gers, Harris	3:54
10.	"Judas Be My Guide"	Dickinson, Murray	3:08
11.	"Weekend Warrior"	Gers, Harris	5:39
12.	"Fear of the Dark"	Harris	7:18

=== Disc: 12 (A Real Dead One) ===
No.	Title	Writer(s)	Length
1.	"The Number of the Beast"	Harris	4:55
2.	"The Trooper"	Harris	3:55
3.	"Prowler"	Harris	4:16
4.	"Transylvania"	Harris	4:26
5.	"Remember Tomorrow"	Di'Anno, Harris	5:53
6.	"Where Eagles Dare"	Harris	4:49
7.	"Sanctuary"	Di'Anno, Harris, Dave Murray	4:53
8.	"Running Free"	Di'Anno, Harris	3:49
9.	"Run to the Hills"	Harris	3:58
10.	"2 Minutes to Midnight"	Dickinson, Smith	5:37
11.	"Iron Maiden"	Harris	5:25
12.	"Hallowed Be Thy Name"	Harris	7:52

=== Disc: 13 (A Real Live One) ===
No.	Title	Writer(s)	Length
1.	"Be Quick or Be Dead"	Dickinson, Gers	3:17
2.	"From Here to Eternity"	Harris	4:20
3.	"Can I Play with Madness"	Dickinson, Harris, Smith	4:43
4.	"Wasting Love"	Dickinson, Gers	5:48
5.	"Tailgunner"	Dickinson, Harris	4:10
6.	"The Evil That Men Do"	Dickinson, Harris, Smith	5:26
7.	"Afraid to Shoot Strangers"	Harris	6:48
8.	"Bring Your Daughter...to the Slaughter"	Dickinson	5:18
9.	"Heaven Can Wait"	Harris	7:29
10.	"The Clairvoyant"	Harris	4:30
11.	"Fear of the Dark"	Harris	7:11

=== Disc: 14 (Live at Donington) ===
Disc One
No.	Title	Writer(s)	Length
1.	"Be Quick or Be Dead"	Bruce Dickinson, Janick Gers	3:53
2.	"The Number of the Beast"	Harris	4:53
3.	"Wrathchild"	Harris	2:54
4.	"From Here to Eternity"	Harris	4:44
5.	"Can I Play with Madness"	Dickinson, Harris, Smith	3:33
6.	"Wasting Love"	Dickinson, Gers	5:36
7.	"Tailgunner"	Dickinson, Harris	4:07
8.	"The Evil That Men Do"	Dickinson, Harris, Smith	7:51
9.	"Afraid to Shoot Strangers"	Harris	6:59
10.	"Fear of the Dark"	Harris	7:08
11.	"Bring Your Daughter...to the Slaughter"	Dickinson	6:12
12.	"The Clairvoyant"	Harris	4:21
13.	"Heaven Can Wait"	Harris	7:20
14.	"Run to the Hills"	Harris	4:16

=== Disc: 15 (Live at Donington) ===
Disc Two
No.	Title	Writer(s)	Length
1.	"2 Minutes to Midnight"	Dickinson, Smith	5:42
2.	"Iron Maiden"	Harris	8:14
3.	"Hallowed Be Thy Name"	Harris	7:28
4.	"The Trooper"	Harris	3:53
5.	"Sanctuary"	Di'Anno, Harris, Murray	5:18
6.	"Running Free (feat. Adrian Smith)"	Di'Anno, Harris	7:56

=== Disc: 16 (In Profile) ===
Written and narrated by Mike Hurst. Features excerpts of various songs, and interviews with Steve Harris, Dave Murray, Rod Smallwood and Blaze Bayley.

No.	Title	Length
1.	"Part 1: Early Maiden Days"	12:18
2.	"Part 2: Groundwork"	11:31
3.	"Part 3: Ascendancy"	14:32
4.	"Part 4: Supremacy"	18:51
5.	"Part 5: Legends"	16:34

== Personnel ==
- Blaze Bayley – vocals (disc 16)
- Martin Birch – producer, engineer, mixing (discs 2–11)
- Albert Boekholt – assistant engineer
- Clive Burr – drums (discs 1–3)
- Sean Burrows – assistant engineer
- George Chin – photography
- Paul Di'Anno – vocals (discs 1–2)
- Bruce Dickinson – vocals (discs 3–15)
- Robert Ellis – photography
- Paul Foster – executive producer
- Simon Fowler – photography
- Janick Gers – guitar (discs 10–15)
- Frank Gibson – assistant engineer
- Hugh Gilmour – art direction, reissue design
- Nigel Green – engineer
- Ross Halfin – photography
- Denis Haliburton – assistant engineer
- Steve Harris – bass, vocals (discs 1–15); producer, mixing (discs 11–15)
- Simon Heyworth – remastering
- Mike Hurst – narrator, liner notes (disc 16)
- Guido Karp – photography
- Michael Kenney – keyboards (discs 9–15)
- Martin Levan – engineer
- Will Malone – producer (disc 1)
- George Marino – mastering
- Nicko McBrain – drums (discs 4–15)
- Mick McKenna – engineer, assistant engineer
- Tony Mottram – photography
- Dave Murray – guitar (discs 1–15)
- Denis O'Regan – photography
- Ronald Prent – assistant engineer
- Derek Riggs – cover illustration, sleeve design, sleeve idea (discs 1–15)
- Gus Shaw – mastering
- Rod Smallwood – photography, concept, sleeve design, sleeve idea
- Adrian Smith – guitar, vocals (discs 2–9, 15)
- Dennis Stratton – guitar, vocals (disc 1)
- Stephane "The Vardengrip" Wissner – engineer
- Roger Woodhead – executive producer
- Tim Young – mastering
- Sarah 'Polly' Polglase – project manager E-CDs
