= A Real Live Dead One =

Live album by Iron Maiden
- Released: 22 September 1998
- Recorded: 15 August 1992 – 4 June 1993
- Venue: Various
- Genre: Heavy metal
- Length: 118:47
- Label: EMI
- Producer: Steve Harris

Iron Maiden chronology
Virtual XI (1998)	A Real Live Dead One (1998)	Eddie's Head (1998)

Professional ratings
Review scores
Source	Rating
AllMusic	2.5/5 stars

A Real Live Dead One is a live album by English heavy metal band Iron Maiden, released on 22 September 1998. The album tracks were recorded at different venues across Europe during the Fear of the Dark Tour in 1992 and the Real Live Tour in 1993.

Released in 1998 alongside the band's entire remastered discography, this album is a compilation of A Real Live One and A Real Dead One, which were both previously issued individually in 1993.

== Track listing ==
All tracks are written by Steve Harris, except where noted.

Disc one: A Real Dead One
No.	Title	Writer(s)	Venue	Length
1.	"The Number of the Beast" (25 August 1992)		Valby-Hallen – Copenhagen, Denmark	4:55
2.	"The Trooper" (27 August 1992)		Ice Hall – Helsinki, Finland	3:55
3.	"Prowler" (30 April 1993)		Palaghiaccio di Marino – Marino, Italy	4:16
4.	"Transylvania" (17 April 1993)		Grugahalle – Essen, Germany	4:26
5.	"Remember Tomorrow" (17 April 1993)	Harris; Paul Di'Anno	Grugahalle – Essen, Germany	5:53
6.	"Where Eagles Dare" (9 April 1993)		Rijnhal – Arnhem, Netherlands	4:49
7.	"Sanctuary" (27 May 1993)	Iron Maiden	Patinoire du Littoral – Neuchâtel, Switzerland	4:53
8.	"Running Free" (27 May 1993)	Harris; Di'Anno	Patinoire du Littoral – Neuchâtel, Switzerland	3:49
9.	"Run to the Hills" (5 April 1993)		Ostravar Aréna – Ostrava, Czech Republic	3:58
10.	"2 Minutes to Midnight" (10 April 1993)	Adrian Smith; Bruce Dickinson	Élysée Montmartre – Paris, France	5:37
11.	"Iron Maiden" (27 August 1992)		Ice Hall – Helsinki, Finland	5:25
12.	"Hallowed Be Thy Name" (4 June 1993)		Olympic Stadium – Moscow, Russia	7:52
Total length:				59:48

Disc two: A Real Live One
No.	Title	Writer(s)	Venue	Length
1.	"Be Quick or Be Dead" (15 August 1992)	Dickinson; Janick Gers	Super Rock festival – Mannheim, Germany	3:17
2.	"From Here to Eternity" (25 August 1992)		Valby-Hallen – Copenhagen, Denmark	4:20
3.	"Can I Play With Madness" (2 September 1992)	Smith; Dickinson; Harris	Brabanthallen – Den Bosch, Netherlands	4:42
4.	"Wasting Love" (5 September 1992)	Dickinson; Gers	Grande halle de la Villette – Paris, France	5:48
5.	"Tailgunner" (4 September 1992)	Harris; Dickinson	Patinoire de Malley – Lausanne, Switzerland	4:10
6.	"The Evil That Men Do" (17 August 1992)	Smith; Dickinson; Harris	Forest National – Brussels, Belgium	5:26
7.	"Afraid to Shoot Strangers" (29 August 1992)		Globe Arena – Stockholm, Sweden	6:48
8.	"Bring Your Daughter... to the Slaughter" (27 August 1992)	Dickinson	Ice Hall – Helsinki, Finland	5:18
9.	"Heaven Can Wait" (12 September 1992)		Monsters of Rock festival – Reggio Nell Emilia, Italy	7:29
10.	"The Clairvoyant" (27 August 1992)		Ice Hall – Helsinki, Finland	4:30
11.	"Fear of the Dark" (27 August 1992)		Ice Hall – Helsinki, Finland	7:11
Total length:				58:59

== Personnel ==
Production and performance credits are adapted from the album liner notes.

Iron Maiden

- Bruce Dickinson – vocals
- Dave Murray – guitar
- Janick Gers – guitar
- Steve Harris – bass, production, mixing
- Nicko McBrain – drums

Additional musicians

- Michael Kenney – keyboards

Production

- Mick McKenna – engineering
- Tim Young – mastering
- Derek Riggs – cover illustration
- Guido Karp – photography
- George Chin – photography
- Tony Mottram – photography
- Hugh Gilmour – reissue design
- Rod Smallwood – management
- Andy Taylor – management
