= The First Ten Years: The Videos =

1990 music video compilation by Iron Maiden

Video by Iron Maiden
- Released: November 27, 1990; 1992 (reissue)
- Genre: Heavy metal
- Length: 1:13:00
- Label: PMI

Iron Maiden chronology
Maiden England (1989)	The First Ten Years: The Videos (1990)	Donington Live 1992 (1993)

Alternative cover
- From There to Eternity is an American extended version of The First Ten Years: The Videos, including tracks through the band's 1992 album Fear of the Dark

Professional ratings
Review scores
Source	Rating
AllMusic	2/5 stars

The First Ten Years: The Videos (re-issued as From There to Eternity) is a VHS and laserdisc music video compilation released by the heavy metal band Iron Maiden in 1990. It features all of the band's promotional videos from 1980–1990. The video is an addition to The First Ten Years CD/double 12" single series, also released by Iron Maiden in 1990.

== Track listing ==
Songs
No.	Title	Writer(s)	Original Release	Length
1.	"Women in Uniform" (Skyhooks Cover)	Greg Macainsh	1980 ~ Women in Uniform
2.	"Wrathchild" (Live in 1980)	Steve Harris	1981 ~ Live at the Rainbow
3.	"Run to the Hills"	Harris	1982 ~ The Number of the Beast
4.	"The Number of the Beast"	Harris	1982 ~ The Number of the Beast
5.	"Flight of Icarus"	Adrian Smith, Bruce Dickinson	1983 ~ Piece of Mind
6.	"The Trooper"	Harris	1983 ~ Piece of Mind
7.	"2 Minutes to Midnight"	Smith, Dickinson	1984 ~ Powerslave
8.	"Aces High"	Harris	1984 ~ Powerslave
9.	"Running Free" (Live in 1985)	Harris, Paul Di'Anno	1985 ~ Live After Death
10.	"Wasted Years"	Smith	1986 ~ Somewhere in Time
11.	"Stranger in a Strange Land"	Smith	1986 ~ Somewhere in Time
12.	"Can I Play With Madness"	Smith, Dickinson, Harris	1988 ~ Seventh Son of a Seventh Son
13.	"The Evil That Men Do"	Smith, Dickinson, Harris	1988 ~ Seventh Son of a Seventh Son
14.	"The Clairvoyant"	Harris	1988 ~ Seventh Son of a Seventh Son
15.	"Infinite Dreams" (Live in 1988)	Harris	1989 ~ Maiden England
16.	"Holy Smoke"	Harris, Dickinson	1990 ~ No Prayer for the Dying
17.	"Tailgunner"	Harris, Dickinson	1990 ~ No Prayer for the Dying
18.	"Bring Your Daughter... to the Slaughter"	Dickinson	1990 ~ No Prayer for the Dying
19.	"Be Quick or Be Dead"	Dickinson, Janick Gers	1992 ~ Fear of the Dark
20.	"Wasting Love"	Dickinson, Gers	1992 ~ Fear of the Dark
21.	"From Here to Eternity"	Harris	1992 ~ Fear of the Dark

Tracks 17–21 were included on the 1992 reissue of The First Ten Years: The Videos, re-titled as From There to Eternity.

== Certifications ==
Region	Certification	Certified units/sales
Canada (Music Canada)	Gold	5,000^{^}
^{^} Shipments figures based on certification alone.
