= A Real Live One =

Live album by Iron Maiden
- Released: 22 March 1993
- Recorded: 15 August – 12 September 1992
- Venue: Various
- Genre: Heavy metal
- Length: 58:49
- Label: EMI
- Producer: Steve Harris

Iron Maiden chronology
Fear of the Dark (1992)	A Real Live One (1993)	A Real Dead One (1993)

Singles from A Real Live One
- 1. "Fear of the Dark" Released: 1 March 1993

Professional ratings
Review scores
Source	Rating
AllMusic	4/5 stars
Collector's Guide to Heavy Metal	4/10
Select	1/5 medals

A Real Live One is a live album by English heavy metal band Iron Maiden, released on 22 March 1993. The album tracks were recorded at 9 different venues in Europe during the Fear of the Dark Tour in 1992. This album features songs from the Somewhere in Time (1986) through Fear of the Dark (1992) eras, while counterpart A Real Dead One only contains songs from the pre-Somewhere in Time albums.

When Iron Maiden re-released all of their pre-The X Factor albums in 1998, this album was combined with A Real Dead One to form the 2-disc A Real Live Dead One. The album cover was made by longtime Iron Maiden cover artist Derek Riggs, whose work for the Fear of the Dark album was rejected. "Fear of the Dark" was released as a single.

== Track listing ==
A Real Live One track listing
No.	Title	Writer(s)	Venue	Length
1.	"Be Quick or Be Dead" (15 August 1992)	Bruce Dickinson; Janick Gers	Super Rock festival – Mannheim, Germany	3:15
2.	"From Here to Eternity" (25 August 1992)	Steve Harris	Valby-Hallen – Copenhagen, Denmark	4:19
3.	"Can I Play With Madness" (2 September 1992)	Adrian Smith; Dickinson; Harris	Brabanthallen – Den Bosch, Netherlands	4:42
4.	"Wasting Love" (5 September 1992)	Dickinson; Gers	Grande halle de la Villette – Paris, France	5:47
5.	"Tailgunner" (4 September 1992)	Harris; Dickinson	Patinoire de Malley – Lausanne, Switzerland	4:09
6.	"The Evil That Men Do" (17 August 1992)	Smith; Dickinson; Harris	Forest National – Brussels, Belgium	5:25
7.	"Afraid to Shoot Strangers" (29 August 1992)	Harris	Globe Arena – Stockholm, Sweden	6:47
8.	"Bring Your Daughter... to the Slaughter" (27 August 1992)	Dickinson	Ice Hall – Helsinki, Finland	5:17
9.	"Heaven Can Wait" (12 September 1992)	Harris	Monsters of Rock festival – Reggio Nell Emilia, Italy	7:28
10.	"The Clairvoyant" (27 August 1992)	Harris	Ice Hall – Helsinki, Finland	4:29
11.	"Fear of the Dark" (27 August 1992)	Harris	Ice Hall – Helsinki, Finland	7:11
Total length:				58:49

== Personnel ==
Production and performance credits are adapted from the album liner notes.

Iron Maiden

- Bruce Dickinson – vocals
- Dave Murray – guitar
- Janick Gers – guitar, backing vocals
- Steve Harris – bass, backing vocals, production, mixing
- Nicko McBrain – drums

Additional musicians

- Michael Kenney – keyboards

Production

- Mick McKenna – engineering
- Tim Young – mastering
- Derek Riggs – cover illustration
- Tony Mottram – photography
- George Chin – photography

== Charts ==
Chart (1993)	Peak position
Australian Albums (ARIA)	48
Austrian Albums (Ö3 Austria)	11
Canada Top Albums/CDs (RPM)	69
Dutch Albums (Album Top 100)	45
Finnish Albums (Suomen virallennin albumlista)	6
French Albums (SNEP)	13
German Albums (Offizielle Top 100)	25
Italian Albums (Musica e dischi)	14
Japanese Albums (Oricon)	29
Swedish Albums (Sverigetopplistan)	30
Swiss Albums (Schweizer Hitparade)	25
UK Albums (Official Charts)	3
US Billboard 200	106

== Certifications ==
Region	Certification	Certified units/sales
France (SNEP)	Gold	100,000^{*}
Italy (FIMI)	Gold	100,000
United Kingdom (BPI)	Silver	60,000^{^}
^{*} Sales figures based on certification alone.^{^} Shipments figures based on certification alone.
