= A Real Dead One =

Live album by Iron Maiden
- Released: 18 October 1993
- Recorded: 25 August 1992 – 4 June 1993
- Venue: Various
- Genre: Heavy metal
- Length: 59:40
- Label: EMI
- Producer: Steve Harris

Iron Maiden chronology
A Real Live One (1993)	A Real Dead One (1993)	Live at Donington (1993)

Singles from A Real Dead One
- 1. "Hallowed Be Thy Name" Released: 4 October 1993

Professional ratings
Review scores
Source	Rating
AllMusic	2/5 stars
Collector's Guide to Heavy Metal	6/10

A Real Dead One is a live album by English heavy metal band Iron Maiden, released on 18 October 1993. It was recorded at various concerts across Europe, during the Fear of the Dark Tour in 1992 and the Real Live Tour in 1993. It features songs from the very beginning of the band's career (1975) to the Powerslave era (1984), while counterpart A Real Live One contains songs from only the post-Powerslave albums.

The album spent three weeks on the UK chart, and was promptly followed by Live at Donington.

When Maiden rereleased all of their pre-The X Factor albums in 1998, this album was combined with A Real Live One to form the two-disc A Real Live Dead One.

The cover is by long-time Maiden artist Derek Riggs, and depicts Eddie as a disc jockey in Hell.

"Hallowed Be Thy Name" was released as a single and hit No.9 on UK singles chart.

== Track listing ==
All tracks are written by Steve Harris, except where noted.

A Real Dead One track listing
No.	Title	Writer(s)	Venue	Length
1.	"The Number of the Beast" (25 August 1992)		Valby-Hallen – Copenhagen, Denmark	4:54
2.	"The Trooper" (27 August 1992)		Ice Hall – Helsinki, Finland	3:55
3.	"Prowler" (30 April 1993)		Palaghiaccio di Marino – Marino, Italy	4:15
4.	"Transylvania" (17 April 1993)		Grugahalle – Essen, Germany	4:25
5.	"Remember Tomorrow" (17 April 1993)	Harris; Paul Di'Anno	Grugahalle – Essen, Germany	5:52
6.	"Where Eagles Dare" (9 April 1993)		Rijnhal – Arnhem, Netherlands	4:49
7.	"Sanctuary" (27 May 1993)	Harris; Murray; Di'Anno	Patinoire du Littoral – Neuchâtel, Switzerland	4:53
8.	"Running Free" (27 May 1993)	Harris; Di'Anno	Patinoire du Littoral – Neuchâtel, Switzerland	3:48
9.	"Run to the Hills" (5 April 1993)		Ostravar Aréna – Ostrava, Czech Republic	3:57
10.	"2 Minutes to Midnight" (10 April 1993)	Adrian Smith; Bruce Dickinson	Élysée Montmartre – Paris, France	5:37
11.	"Iron Maiden" (27 August 1992)		Ice Hall – Helsinki, Finland	5:24
12.	"Hallowed Be Thy Name" (4 June 1993)		Olympic Stadium – Moscow, Russia	7:51
Total length:				59:40

== Personnel ==
Production credits are adapted from the album liner notes.

Iron Maiden

- Bruce Dickinson – vocals
- Dave Murray – guitar
- Janick Gers – guitar
- Steve Harris – bass, production, mixing
- Nicko McBrain – drums

Additional musicians

- Michael Kenney – keyboards

Production

- Mick McKenna – engineering
- Tim Young – mastering
- Derek Riggs – cover illustration
- Guido Karp – photography
- George Chin – photography
- Tony Mottram – photography

== Charts ==
Chart (1993)	Peak position
Australian Albums (ARIA)	138
Dutch Albums (Album Top 100)	97
Finnish Albums (The Official Finnish Charts)	12
German Albums (Offizielle Top 100)	50
Hungarian Albums (MAHASZ)	25
Japanese Albums (Oricon)	16
Swedish Albums (Sverigetopplistan)	14
Swiss Albums (Schweizer Hitparade)	37
UK Albums (OCC)	12
US Billboard 200	140

Chart (1998)	Peak position
UK Rock & Metal Albums (OCC)	37
