= Live at Donington (Iron Maiden album) =

1993 live album by Iron Maiden

Live album and video by Iron Maiden
- Released: 8 November 1993
- Recorded: 22 August 1992
- Venues: Monsters of Rock festival, Donington Park
- Genre: Heavy metal
- Length: 112:05 (audio); 120:00 (video, approx.)
- Label: EMI
- Director: Samuel Bayer
- Producers: Steve Harris (audio); Paul Spencer (video)

Iron Maiden chronology
A Real Dead One (1993)	Live at Donington (1993)	Maiden England (1994)

Iron Maiden video chronology
The First Ten Years: The Videos (1990)	Donington Live 1992 (1993)	Raising Hell (1994)

Alternative cover
- Cover art by Mark Wilkinson, 1998 remastered edition

Alternative cover
- VHS cover

Professional ratings
Review scores
Source	Rating
AllMusic	3/5 stars
Collector's Guide to Heavy Metal	6/10

Live at Donington (released on VHS as Donington Live 1992) is a live album and video by the English heavy metal band Iron Maiden, documenting their second headlining appearance at the Monsters of Rock festival at Donington Park, a motorsport circuit located near Castle Donington. The concert took place on 22 August 1992 during the Fear of the Dark Tour in front of a crowd of almost 80,000.

It was originally only released as a limited edition triple vinyl set, with a 2 disc CD release only in Brazil, Canada, Holland, Italy, South Korea, the UK and Japan. It spent a single week on the UK album chart.

Guitarist Adrian Smith joins the band on this version of "Running Free".

Live at Donington became a regular part of the band's CD catalogue with the 1998 reissues. Replacing the original plain white cover, with the band's logo in black, the 1998 reissue uses the original concert poster by Mark Wilkinson. The track list was spread differently, to make room for a multimedia section on disc two.

== Track listing ==
All tracks are written by Steve Harris, except where noted.

Disc one
No.	Title	Writer(s)	Length
1.	"Be Quick or Be Dead"	Bruce Dickinson; Janick Gers	3:53
2.	"The Number of the Beast"		4:54
3.	"Wrathchild"		2:54
4.	"From Here to Eternity"		4:44
5.	"Can I Play With Madness"	Adrian Smith; Dickinson; Harris	3:33
6.	"Wasting Love"	Dickinson; Gers	5:37
7.	"Tailgunner"	Harris; Dickinson	4:08
8.	"The Evil That Men Do"	Smith; Dickinson; Harris	7:58
9.	"Afraid to Shoot Strangers"		6:52
10.	"Fear of the Dark"		7:11
Total length:			51:44

Disc two
No.	Title	Writer(s)	Length
1.	"Bring Your Daughter... to the Slaughter"	Dickinson	6:17
2.	"The Clairvoyant"		4:22
3.	"Heaven Can Wait"		7:20
4.	"Run to the Hills"		3:56
5.	"2 Minutes to Midnight"	Smith; Dickinson	5:38
6.	"Iron Maiden"		8:15
7.	"Hallowed Be Thy Name"		7:28
8.	"The Trooper"		3:53
9.	"Sanctuary"	Iron Maiden	5:18
10.	"Running Free" (feat. Adrian Smith)	Harris; Paul Di'Anno	7:54
Total length:			60:21

=== Notes ===
- To make room for the multimedia section on the second disc of the 1998 remaster, "Bring Your Daughter... to the Slaughter", "The Clairvoyant", "Heaven Can Wait" and "Run to the Hills" were moved to disc one.

== Credits ==
Production and performance credits are adapted from the album liner notes.

Iron Maiden

- Bruce Dickinson – vocals
- Dave Murray – guitar
- Janick Gers – guitar
- Steve Harris – bass guitar, producer, mixing
- Nicko McBrain – drums

Additional musicians

- Michael Kenney – keyboards
- Adrian Smith – guest guitar on "Running Free"

Production

- Mick McKenna – engineer
- Tim Young – mastering
- Hugh Gilmour – reissue design

== Charts ==
Chart (1993)	Peak position
Australian Albums (ARIA)	180
Japanese Albums (Oricon)	39
UK Albums (Official Charts)	23

== Certifications ==
VHS

Region	Certification	Certified units/sales
Argentina (CAPIF)	Platinum	8,000^{^}
^{^} Shipments figures based on certification alone.
