= Raising Hell (video) =

Video by Iron Maiden
- Released: 5 September 1994
- Recorded: 28 August 1993
- Venue: Pinewood Studios, London
- Genre: Heavy metal
- Length: 113:00 (approx.)
- Label: PMI
- Director: Declan Lowney
- Producer: Michael Pillot

Iron Maiden chronology
Donington Live 1992 (1993)	Raising Hell (1994)	Classic Albums: Iron Maiden – The Number of the Beast (2001)

Raising Hell is a concert video by the heavy metal band Iron Maiden, filmed on 28 August 1993 at the Pinewood Studios in London, England and broadcast live on pay-per-view television in the United Kingdom and on MTV in North America. The video was originally distributed on VHS and Laserdisc by BMG Special Products in the US and EMI in the rest of the world. It was subsequently released on DVD several years later in the US.

The concert was the last to feature vocalist Bruce Dickinson until his return to the band in 1999. The band played on stage in conjunction with horror magician Simon Drake, who ended up "killing" Dickinson in an iron maiden torture device, "amputated" Dave Murray's hands on a table saw and "killed" members of the crew and audience.

== Critical reception ==
Professional ratings
Review scores
Source	Rating
AllMusic	3/5 stars

AllMusic gave the video 3 out of 5, commenting that it's "extremely cheesy" but "a blast to watch," going on to state that it "will please most Iron Maiden fans."

== Track listing ==
All tracks are written by Steve Harris, except where noted.

1. "Be Quick or Be Dead" (Bruce Dickinson, Janick Gers)
2. "The Trooper"
3. "The Evil That Men Do" (Adrian Smith, Dickinson, Harris)
4. "The Clairvoyant"
5. "Hallowed Be Thy Name"
6. "Wrathchild"
7. "Transylvania" (instrumental)
8. "From Here to Eternity"
9. "Fear of the Dark"
10. "The Number of the Beast"
11. "Bring Your Daughter... to the Slaughter" (Dickinson)
12. "2 Minutes to Midnight" (Smith, Dickinson)
13. "Afraid to Shoot Strangers"
14. "Heaven Can Wait"
15. "Sanctuary" (Iron Maiden)
16. "Run to the Hills"
17. "Iron Maiden"

== Credits ==
- Bruce Dickinson - vocals
- Dave Murray - guitar
- Janick Gers - guitar
- Steve Harris - bass
- Nicko McBrain - drums
