= Fear of the Dark (song) =

1992 song by Iron Maiden

Song by Iron Maiden

from the album Fear of the Dark
- Released: 11 May 1992
- Recorded: 1991 – April 1992
- Studio: Barnyard, Essex, England
- Genre: Heavy metal
- Length: 7:16
- Label: EMI
- Songwriter: Steve Harris
- Producers: Martin Birch; Steve Harris

"Fear of the Dark" is a song by English heavy metal band Iron Maiden. Written by Steve Harris, the band's bass player and primary songwriter, it serves as the title and closing track to Iron Maiden's 1992 album Fear of the Dark.

The Flight 666 version of the song was released as downloadable content for the Rock Band video game series on 9 June 2009.

== Lyrics ==
The song's lyrics tell the story of a man who has always been intensely afraid of the dark. He recalls the many times he has walked alone, and recollections of the feeling of being followed while walking at night. Strictly, the song is about paranoid ideas (fear of being watched or harmed by other persons) rather than phobia (fear of objects and situations), even though the latter is referred to in the lyrics ("Have a phobia that someone's always there"); darkness seems to be the context rather than the reason for the fear.

According to Bruce Dickinson, Steve Harris wrote this song because he himself was really afraid of the dark.

== Members ==
- Bruce Dickinson – vocals
- Dave Murray – guitar
- Janick Gers – guitar
- Steve Harris – bass
- Nicko McBrain – drums

== Album appearances ==
Album title	Year	Type	Recording location and date
Fear of the Dark	1992	Studio	Barnyard – Essex, England (1991-92)
A Real Live One	1993	Live	Ice Hall – Helsinki, Finland (27 August 1992)
Live at Donington	1993	Live	Monsters of Rock – Donington Park – Leicestershire, England (22 August 1992)
Raising Hell	1994	Live	Pinewood Studios – Iver, England (28 August 1993)
Best of the Beast	1996	Live	Ice Hall – Helsinki, Finland (27 August 1992)
A Real Live Dead One	1998	Live	Ice Hall – Helsinki, Finland (27 August 1992)
Eddie's Head	1998	Studio/Live	Barnyard – Essex, England (1991-92); Ice Hall – Helsinki, Finland (27 August 1992); Monsters of Rock – Donington Park – Leicestershire, England (22 August 1992)
Ed Hunter	1999	Studio	Barnyard – Essex, England (1991-92)
Rock in Rio	2002	Live	Rock in Rio 3 – Rio de Janeiro, Brazil (19 January 2001)
Edward the Great	2002/05	Live	Rock in Rio 3 – Rio de Janeiro, Brazil (19 January 2001); Westfalenhallen – Dortmund, Germany (24 November 2003)
Visions of the Beast	2003	Live	Rock in Rio 3 – Rio de Janeiro, Brazil (19 January 2001); Monsters of Rock – Donington Park – Leicestershire, England (22 August 1992)
The Essential Iron Maiden	2005	Live	Rock in Rio 3 – Rio de Janeiro, Brazil (19 January 2001)
Death on the Road	2005	Live	Westfalenhallen – Dortmund, Germany (24 November 2003)
Flight 666	2009	Live	Estadio Ferro Carril Oeste – Buenos Aires, Argentina (7 March 2008)
From Fear to Eternity	2011	Live	Rock in Rio 3 – Rio de Janeiro, Brazil (19 January 2001)
En Vivo!	2012	Live	Estadio Nacional – Santiago, Chile (10 April 2011)
The Book of Souls: Live Chapter	2017	Live	Arena Castelão – Fortaleza, Brazil (24 March 2016)
Nights of the Dead	2020	Live	Palacio de los Deportes – Mexico City, Mexico (27–30 September 2019)

== Covers ==
- Graveworm, for their 2001 album Scourge of Malice (often incorrectly attributed to Cradle of Filth or Children of Bodom).
- Alternative rock band Fightstar performed a cover of the song for the Kerrang! Maiden Heaven tribute album.
- Metal band Lonely The Brave covered the song and released as track 4 of Maiden Heaven Volume 2 tribute album in Kerrang Magazine Issue 1623.
- It was performed by Chuck Billy, Craig Goldy, Ricky Phillips, and Mikkey Dee for the tribute album Numbers from the Beast.
- The Finnish Metal/Rock band Sturm und Drang performed a cover of this song on their 2008 release Rock N' Roll Children as a bonus track
- A cappella metal band Van Canto covered it on their second album Hero.
- Doro Pesch performed with Blaze Bayley on a Classical live version in 2004 at Wacken Open Air with strings and acoustic guitars.
- Pentagram (a.k.a. Mezarkabul) (only live).

== Live single ==
"Fear of the Dark (live)"

Single by Iron Maiden

from the album A Real Live One
- B-side: "Bring Your Daughter... to the Slaughter" (live); "Be Quick or Be Dead" (live); "Tailgunner" (live); "Hooks in You" (live)
- Released: 1 March 1993
- Recorded: 27 August 1992
- Venue: Helsinki Ice Hall
- Genre: Heavy metal
- Length: 7:22
- Label: EMI
- Songwriter: Steve Harris
- Producer: Steve Harris

Iron Maiden singles chronology
"Wasting Love" (1992)	"Fear of the Dark (live)" (1993)	"Hallowed Be Thy Name (live)" (1993)

A live version of the song was released on 1 March 1993 to promote A Real Live One, a live album featuring recordings from various concerts throughout the Fear of the Dark Tour. This song was recorded at the Helsinki Ice Hall on 27 August 1992. It is the 26th single released by the band, reaching number 8 in the UK charts.

Different tracks taken from the same album served as B-sides, including "Bring Your Daughter... to the Slaughter", "Be Quick or Be Dead", and "Tailgunner", in addition to "Hooks in You", recorded in 1990 during the No Prayer on the Road tour. The initial pressing of the 7" cut-to-shape vinyl picture disc listed "Hooks in You" as the B-side but actually played "Tailgunner". This mis-press was quickly corrected by EMI on future pressings.

"Fear of the Dark" was nominated for a Grammy Award in 1994 in the "Best Metal Performance" category, but lost to "I Don't Want to Change the World" by Ozzy Osbourne.

The single's cover art features Eddie playing Steve Harris' signature Fender Precision Bass.

=== Track listing ===
7" poster bag single

Side one
No.	Title	Writer(s)	Length
1.	"Fear of the Dark" (live at the Ice Hall, Helsinki, Finland, 27 August 1992)	Steve Harris	7:22

Side two
No.	Title	Writer(s)	Length
2.	"Tailgunner" (live at Patinoire de Malley, Lausanne, Switzerland, 4 September 1992)	Bruce Dickinson; Harris	4:10

7" picture disc

Side one
No.	Title	Writer(s)	Length
1.	"Fear of the Dark" (live at the Ice Hall, Helsinki, Finland, 27 August 1992)	Harris	7:22

Side two
No.	Title	Writer(s)	Length
2.	"Hooks in You" (live at Wembley Arena, London, England, 17 December 1990)	Dickinson; Adrian Smith	3:45

Italy 12" maxi single

Side one
No.	Title	Writer(s)	Length
1.	"Fear of the Dark" (live at the Ice Hall, Helsinki, Finland, 27 August 1992)	Harris	7:22
2.	"Be Quick or Be Dead" (live at Super Rock festival, Mannheim, Germany, 15 August 1992)	Dickinson; Janick Gers	3:20

Side two
No.	Title	Writer(s)	Length
3.	"Hooks in You" (live at Wembley Arena, London, England, 17 December 1990)	Dickinson; Adrian Smith	3:45

UK CD maxi single

No.	Title	Writer(s)	Length
1.	"Fear of the Dark" (live at the Ice Hall, Helsinki, Finland, 27 August 1992)	Harris	7:22
2.	"Bring Your Daughter... to the Slaughter" (live at the Ice Hall, Helsinki, Finland, 27 August 1992)	Dickinson	5:30
3.	"Hooks in You" (live at Wembley Arena, London, England, 17 December 1990)	Dickinson; Smith	3:45

Italy and The Netherlands CD maxi single

No.	Title	Writer(s)	Length
1.	"Fear of the Dark" (live at the Ice Hall, Helsinki, Finland, 27 August 1992)	Harris	7:22
2.	"Be Quick or Be Dead" (live at Super Rock festival, Mannheim, Germany, 15 August 1992)	Dickinson; Gers	3:20
3.	"Hooks in You" (live at Wembley Arena, London, England, 17 December 1990)	Dickinson; Smith	3:45

=== Chart performance ===
Chart (1993)	Peak position
Finland (Suomen virallinen lista)	6
Irish Singles Chart	17
UK Singles Chart	8

== Certifications ==
Region	Certification	Certified units/sales
Italy (FIMI)	Gold	50,000^{‡}
New Zealand (RMNZ)	Gold	15,000^{‡}
Poland (ZPAV)	Gold	25,000^{‡}
Spain (Promusicae)	Gold	30,000^{‡}
United Kingdom (BPI)	Silver	200,000^{‡}
^{‡} Sales+streaming figures based on certification alone.

== In popular culture ==
=== Film ===
In Fear Street Part One: 1994, the character Josh Johnson wears an Iron Maiden shirt and is shown listening to the song Fear of the Dark.

=== Video games ===
In February 2024, Iron Maiden collaborated with the asymmetrical horror video game Dead by Daylight, which gave killers Eddie-inspired cosmetics and survivors Iron Maiden band shirts. This song was used as lobby music upon the launch of the collaboration, audible whenever characters had Iron Maiden cosmetics equipped.
