= Hallowed Be Thy Name (song) =

1982 song by Iron Maiden

Song by Iron Maiden

from the album The Number of the Beast
- Released: 22 March 1982
- Studio: Battery, London
- Genre: Heavy metal; progressive metal
- Length: 7:08
- Label: EMI
- Songwriter: Steve Harris
- Producer: Martin Birch

"Hallowed Be Thy Name" is the eighth and final track on Iron Maiden's landmark 1982 album The Number of the Beast. The song was written by bassist Steve Harris and has been acclaimed as one of the greatest heavy metal songs of all time. It is also considered one of the band's signature songs. It peaked at #50 on the US Mainstream Rock chart despite not being released as a single.

== Synopsis ==
"Hallowed Be Thy Name" has remained in almost all of the band's set-lists since the album's recording, the only exceptions being the Maiden England World Tour 2012–14, the second leg of the Book of Souls World Tour in 2017, and The Future Past World Tour in 2023. Allmusic describes it as "perhaps the most celebrated of the band's extended epics; it's the tale of a prisoner about to be hanged, featuring some of Harris' most philosophical lyrics." Several band-members have since stated that it is one of their favourite tracks, with Bruce Dickinson describing it as "fantastic" and that performing it live is like "narrating a movie to the audience."

It is one of the most covered songs in Iron Maiden's catalogue, with versions released by artists such as Dream Theater, Machine Head, Cradle of Filth and Iced Earth. Iron Maiden also recorded the song as part of Channel Four's 2007 television series, Live from Abbey Road, while a version recorded for BBC Radio 1 in 2005 was used as a B-side on "The Reincarnation of Benjamin Breeg" single. The song's title is a line from the Lord's Prayer.

== Songwriting lawsuit ==
A section of the lyrics is lifted from Beckett's 1973 song "Life's Shadow". Iron Maiden manager Rod Smallwood was the agent for Beckett and a teenage Steve Harris saw the band play this song live. Harris and Dave Murray settled with one of the credited songwriters, Robert Barton. The other songwriter, Brian Ingham, has sued Iron Maiden for his share of the profits from the song. Ingham was unaware of the matter until 2011 and Barton claimed to be the sole songwriter during the original settlement.

On 12 March 2018, it was reported that the band had settled the case out of court. The group's lawyers had argued that Harris initially used the lyrics as a placeholder and did not have time to change them before the album's release. A spokesperson for the band states that they settled out of court for pragmatic reasons and to avoid escalating legal fees.

== Personnel ==
- Bruce Dickinson – vocals
- Dave Murray – guitar
- Adrian Smith – guitar
- Steve Harris – bass
- Clive Burr – drums

== Live single ==
"Hallowed Be Thy Name (live)"

Single by Iron Maiden

from the album A Real Dead One
- B-side: "The Trooper" (live); "Wasted Years" (live); "Wrathchild" (live)
- Released: 4 October 1993
- Recorded: 4 June 1993
- Venue: Olympic Arena, Moscow
- Genre: Heavy metal
- Length: 7:26
- Label: EMI
- Songwriter: Steve Harris
- Producer: Steve Harris

Iron Maiden singles chronology
"Fear of the Dark (live)" (1993)	"Hallowed Be Thy Name (live)" (1993)	"Man on the Edge" (1995)

A live version of the song was released as a single on 4 October 1993 to promote A Real Dead One, a live album featuring recordings from various concerts throughout the Fear of the Dark and Real Live tours. The song was recorded at the Olympic Arena in Moscow on 4 June 1993 during the Real Live Tour. The single's B-sides "The Trooper", "Wasted Years" and "Wrathchild" were recorded during the same tours, but only "The Trooper" is featured on the album. It is the band's last single to feature vocalist Bruce Dickinson until 2000's "The Wicker Man".

The cover of the single shows Eddie as the devil impaling Bruce Dickinson on a pitchfork.

=== Track listing ===
==== UK 7" red vinyl ====
All tracks are written by Steve Harris, except "Wasted Years" written by Adrian Smith.

Side one
No.	Title	Length
1.	"Hallowed Be Thy Name" (live at Olympic Arena, Moscow, Russia, 4 June 1993)	7:26

Side two
No.	Title	Length
2.	"Wrathchild" (live at the Ice Hall, Helsinki, Finland, 27 August 1992)	2:55

==== UK 12" picture disc ====
Side one
No.	Title	Length
1.	"Hallowed Be Thy Name" (live at Olympic Arena, Moscow, Russia, 4 June 1993)	7:26

Side two
No.	Title	Length
2.	"The Trooper" (live at the Ice Hall, Helsinki, Finland, 27 August 1992)	3:53
3.	"Wasted Years" (live at Stadthalle, Bremen, Germany, 16 April 1993)	4:42

==== CD maxi single ====
No.	Title	Length
1.	"Hallowed Be Thy Name" (live at Olympic Arena, Moscow, Russia, 4 June 1993)	7:26
2.	"The Trooper" (live at the Ice Hall, Helsinki, Finland, 27 August 1992)	3:53
3.	"Wasted Years" (live at Stadthalle, Bremen, Germany, 16 April 1993)	4:42
4.	"Wrathchild" (live at the Ice Hall, Helsinki, Finland, 27 August 1992)	2:55

=== Personnel ===
- Bruce Dickinson – vocals
- Dave Murray – guitar
- Janick Gers – guitar
- Steve Harris – bass
- Nicko McBrain – drums

=== Chart performance ===
Chart (1993)	Peak position
Irish Singles Chart	16
UK Singles Chart	9
