= Holy Smoke (song) =

Single by Iron Maiden

from the album No Prayer for the Dying
- B-side: "All in Your Mind"; "Kill Me Ce Soir"
- Released: 10 September 1990
- Genre: Heavy metal
- Length: 3:47
- Label: EMI
- Songwriter(s): Steve Harris, Bruce Dickinson
- Producer(s): Martin Birch

Iron Maiden singles chronology
"Infinite Dreams (Live in 1988)" (1989)	"Holy Smoke" (1990)	"Bring Your Daughter... to the Slaughter" (1990)

"Holy Smoke" is a song by English heavy metal band Iron Maiden. It is the first single release to feature guitarist Janick Gers, who joined the band in mid-1990. It was released just weeks before the album, No Prayer for the Dying, and climbed to number three on the UK Singles Chart.

== Synopsis ==
The song deals with the many televangelist scandals that took place in the United States in the late 1980s, including mentions of "Jimmy the Reptile" (a reference to Jimmy Swaggart), "The TV Queen" (a possible reference to Tammy Faye Bakker), Noah, and "plenty of bad preachers for the Devil to stoke." Contrary to what some believe, however, this song is not aimed at the Christian religion itself, but rather the people that abuse it to make gains for themselves. This is one of the very few Iron Maiden songs with profanity in the lyrics (for example, "Flies around shit/bees around honey" and "I've lived in filth/I've lived in sin/and I still smell cleaner than the shit you're in"), which is replaced by gunshot sounds in censored versions.

The song is atypical for the band standards, being short and straight. It features a common pop-rock song structure with intro, verse, chorus, verse, chorus, solo, verse and ending with another chorus. The guitar solos are very fiery, making use of artificial harmonics, sweep picking, tapping and wild bends. The first solo is played by Janick Gers, and the second one is played by Dave Murray.

The band took a humorous approach for the video of the song, as the band members are filmed on Steve Harris's farm at Sheering, playing football and driving a tractor, while everything happens in bright daylight. There are similarities with Deep Purple's "Perfect Strangers" video, from 1984, such as writing on an amp behind Janick Gers that reads, "Mind Your Head", possibly a nod to a sign on the bridge shown early in the "Perfect Strangers" video. Michael Kenney, long-time Steve Harris bass technician is repairing Harris bass, Bruce Dickinson is bouncing in a turnip field, dancing randomly and wearing a pink T-shirt, Dave Murray appears playing guitar with his feet in a creek, and Gers plays with a toy guitar in a swimming pool wearing only a pair of white swimming trunks, alternating with him in a goalkeeper kit playing his own guitar. The band's producer, Martin Birch, can also be seen on the video, wearing a kind of sadomasochist costume in some scenes. All this footage is interspersed with scenes of the band rehearsing in the Barnyard recording studio, Steve Harris' daughter Lauren Harris can be seen at the end of the video playing bass with her father. The video was directed by Harris himself.

The B-side has covers of Stray's "All in Your Mind" and Golden Earring's "Kill Me Ce Soir".

== Track listing ==
7-inch single

Side One
No.	Title	Writer(s)	Length
1.	"Holy Smoke"	Bruce Dickinson, Steve Harris	3:47

Side Two
No.	Title	Writer(s)	Length
2.	"All in Your Mind" (Stray Cover)	Del Bromham	4:31

12-inch single

Side One
No.	Title	Writer(s)	Length
1.	"Holy Smoke"	Dickinson, Harris	3:47

Side Two
No.	Title	Writer(s)	Length
2.	"All in Your Mind" (Stray Cover)	Bromham	4:31
3.	"Kill Me Ce Soir" (Golden Earring cover)	George Kooymans, Barry Hay, John Fenton	7:03

== Personnel ==
Production credits are adapted from the 12 inch vinyl cover.

Iron Maiden

- Bruce Dickinson – vocals
- Janick Gers – guitar
- Dave Murray – guitar
- Steve Harris – bass guitar
- Nicko McBrain – drums

Production

- Martin Birch – producer, engineer, mixing
- Derek Riggs – cover illustration
- Ross Halfin – photography

== Charts ==
Chart (1990)	Peak position
Australia (ARIA)	93
Europe (Eurochart Hot 100)	6
Ireland (IRMA)	4
Netherlands (Dutch Top 40)	29
Netherlands (Single Top 100)	25
New Zealand (Recorded Music NZ)	25
Switzerland (Schweizer Hitparade)	20
UK Singles (OCC)	3

== Release history ==
Region	Date	Format(s)	Label(s)	Ref.
United Kingdom	10 September 1990	7-inch vinyl; 12-inch vinyl; CD; cassette	EMI	
Japan	3 October 1990	CD	EMI	
Australia	22 October 1990	7-inch vinyl; cassette	EMI	
