= Fear of the Dark (Iron Maiden album) =

Studio album by Iron Maiden
- Released: 11 May 1992
- Recorded: 1991 – April 1992
- Studios: Barnyard (Essex, England)
- Genre: Heavy metal
- Length: 57:58
- Label: EMI
- Producers: Martin Birch; Steve Harris

Iron Maiden chronology
No Prayer for the Dying (1990)	Fear of the Dark (1992)	A Real Live One (1993)

Singles from Fear of the Dark
- 1. "Be Quick or Be Dead" Released: 13 April 1992; 2. "From Here to Eternity" Released: 29 June 1992; 3. "Wasting Love" Released: 1 September 1992

Fear of the Dark is the ninth studio album by English heavy metal band Iron Maiden. Released on 11 May 1992, it was their third studio release to top the UK Albums Chart, and the last to feature Bruce Dickinson as the group's lead vocalist until his return in 1999. It was also the first album to be produced by bassist and band founder Steve Harris, and the last album to feature the work of producer Martin Birch.

== History ==
After recording its predecessor (1990's No Prayer for the Dying) in a barn on Steve Harris' property with the Rolling Stones Mobile Studio, leading to negative results, for this album Harris had the building converted into a proper studio (christened "Barnyard"). Bruce Dickinson describes the results as "a slight improvement because Martin [Birch] came in and supervised the sound. But there were big limitations on that studio – simply because of its physical size, things like that. [It] actually ended up not too bad, but, you know, a little bit under par."

At 57 minutes and 58 seconds in length, Fear of the Dark was Iron Maiden's first double studio LP, as well as the longest album from Dickinson's first tenure in the band.

The album's musical style showed some experimentation with "Be Quick or Be Dead", a fast-tempo song in a heavier thrash style released as the album's first single, and "Wasting Love", the group's first power ballad, which dates back to Dickinson's first solo album, Tattooed Millionaire. Both songs were Dickinson/Gers collaborations, which contrasted with Harris' "Afraid to Shoot Strangers", a political song from the point of view of a soldier in the Gulf War, Dickinson would often introduce the song as an anti-war narrative. "Fear Is the Key" is about the fear in sexual relationships resulting from AIDS. The song was written around the time when the band learned about the death of Queen singer Freddie Mercury. Dickinson affirmed: "There's a line in 'Fear Is the Key' that goes: "nobody cares 'til somebody famous dies". And that's quite sadly true. [...] As long as the virus was confined to homosexuals or drug-addicts, nobody gave a shit. It's only when celebrities started to die that the masses began to feel concerned". "Weekend Warrior" is about football hooliganism.

Only two of the album's songs, the title track and "Afraid to Shoot Strangers", would survive on tours following 1993. "Fear of the Dark" has been on the set list of every subsequent tour except 2005, in which the band only played songs from their first four albums. "Fear of the Dark" and "Afraid to Shoot Strangers" were the only songs played on the Somewhere Back in Time World Tour and the Maiden England World Tour which were not from the 1980s. "Afraid to Shoot Strangers" became a frequent addition on setlists during Blaze Bayley's tenure with Iron Maiden, following which it returned in 2012.

"Be Quick or Be Dead", "From Here to Eternity" and "Wasting Love" were released as singles.

Guitarist Gordon Giltrap released an album of the same title in 1978. Nicko McBrain was earlier a member of Giltrap's band and played on his 1973 album Giltrap. The Gordon Giltrap logo also uses a font resembling Iron Maiden's logo.

Fear of the Dark Tour was the tour supporting the album.

== Album cover ==
According to the band's biographer, Mick Wall, the Fear of the Dark album cover by Melvyn Grant depicts their mascot, Eddie, "as some sort of Nosferatu tree figure leering at the moon". It was the group's first not to be designed by artist Derek Riggs, who said in 2006 that he had a dispute with Smallwood and Steve Harris over the cover art concept. He submitted over 20 sketch ideas ranging from Eddie being a werewolf to a vampire and then a monster leaning over the foot of the bed, of which all were rejected. In frustration, Riggs told the manager to "find someone else," hung up the phone, and would not work with the band for some time. According to Iron Maiden's manager, Rod Smallwood, the band began accepting contributions from other artists as "We wanted to upgrade Eddie for the 90s. We wanted to take him from the sort of comic-book horror creature and turn him into something a bit more straightforward so that he became even more threatening." Grant, who was familiar with the band's work, applied to the job, and decided "to see how sinister I could make Eddie" without resorting to the blood and sharp objects featured in previous art, instead being more psychological, "so I created this Eddie as part of a tree set in a pleasant wood that you might like to wander through on a beautiful moonlit night, thinking all is wonderful. But unbeknown, the trail would lead a poor innocent soul straight to Eddie’s lair and even if you had no fear of the dark at the time, you defiantly would from then on." Grant added that he tried to create an illusion that there is an extra body alongside Eddie fused to the tree. Following Fear of the Dark, Grant has produced several more covers for Iron Maiden, making him the band's second most-frequent artist after Riggs.

== Reception ==
Professional ratings
Review scores
Source	Rating
AllMusic	2/5 stars
Collector's Guide to Heavy Metal	4/10
Sputnikmusic	3.5/5

Reviews for the album were mixed, with AllMusic commenting that, while "easily an improvement over 1990's lackluster No Prayer for the Dying (both musically and sonically)", the release "still wasn't quite on par with their exceptional work from the '80s". Sputnikmusic were more positive about the release, stating that "though many of the songs are still sub-par by their standards ... the band returns to the lofty heights that they enjoyed for the entirety of the 80's". Billboard gave it a positive review on release, saying Dickinson's voice "shows no sign of wear and tear" and the guitar work "sounds fresh and crisp".

In October 2011, Fear of the Dark was ranked No. 8 on Guitar World magazine's top ten list of guitar albums of 1992.

Fear of the Dark became the third Iron Maiden album to top the UK Albums Chart. It is the band's most successful record in North America after the inception of Nielsen SoundScan in 1991, with 438,000 copies sold as of 2008.

== Track listing ==
Fear of the Dark track listing
No.	Title	Writer(s)	Length
1.	"Be Quick or Be Dead"	Bruce Dickinson; Janick Gers	3:21
2.	"From Here to Eternity"	Steve Harris	3:35
3.	"Afraid to Shoot Strangers"	Harris	6:52
4.	"Fear Is the Key"	Dickinson; Gers	5:30
5.	"Childhood's End"	Harris	4:37
6.	"Wasting Love"	Dickinson; Gers	5:46
7.	"The Fugitive"	Harris	4:52
8.	"Chains of Misery"	Dickinson; Dave Murray	3:33
9.	"The Apparition"	Harris; Gers	3:53
10.	"Judas Be My Guide"	Dickinson; Murray	3:06
11.	"Weekend Warrior"	Harris; Gers	5:37
12.	"Fear of the Dark"	Harris	7:16
Total length:			57:58

1995 reissue bonus disc
No.	Title	Writer(s)	Length
1.	"Nodding Donkey Blues"	Harris; Dickinson; Murray; Nicko McBrain; Gers	3:16
2.	"Space Station No. 5" (Montrose cover)	Ronnie Montrose; Sammy Hagar	11:57
3.	"Roll Over Vic Vella" (parody of Chuck Berry's "Roll Over Beethoven")	Berry; Harris (adapted lyrics)	4:45
4.	"I Can't See My Feelings" (Budgie cover)	Tony Bourge; Burke Shelley	3:48
5.	"No Prayer for the Dying" (live)	Harris	4:24
6.	"Public Enema Number One" (live)	Murray; Dickinson	3:57
7.	"Hooks in You" (live)	Dickinson; Adrian Smith	3:45
Total length:			35:52

- "Space Station No. 5" contains a hidden track titled "Bayswater Ain't a Bad Place to Be", which was previously released as a hidden track on the UK edition of the "Be Quick or Be Dead" single.

== Personnel ==
Production and performance credits are adapted from the album liner notes.

=== Iron Maiden ===
- Bruce Dickinson – vocals
- Dave Murray – guitar
- Janick Gers – guitar
- Steve Harris – bass guitar
- Nicko McBrain – drums

=== Additional musician ===
- Michael Kenney – keyboards

=== Production ===
- Martin "The Juggler" Birch – production, engineering, mixing
- Steve Harris – production, mixing
- Mick "Doctor" McKenna – assistant engineering
- Melvyn Grant – sleeve illustration
- George Chin – photography
- Phil Anstice – photography
- Hugh Gilmour – art direction, design (1998 edition)

== Charts ==
Chart (1992)	Peak position
Australian Albums (ARIA)	11
Austrian Albums (Ö3 Austria)	8
Canada Top Albums/CDs (RPM)	12
Dutch Albums (Album Top 100)	36
Finnish Albums (The Official Finnish Charts)	4
French Albums (SNEP)	6
German Albums (Offizielle Top 100)	5
Hungarian Albums (MAHASZ)	25
Italian Albums (Musica e dischi)	7
Japanese Albums (Oricon)	11
New Zealand Albums (RMNZ)	4
Norwegian Albums (VG-lista)	6
Spanish Albums (AFYVE)	26
Swedish Albums (Sverigetopplistan)	8
Swiss Albums (Schweizer Hitparade)	5
UK Albums (Official Charts)	1
US Billboard 200	12

Chart (2010)	Peak position
Greek Albums (IFPI)	53

Chart (2017–2019)	Peak position
Belgian Albums (Ultratop Wallonia)	63
Italian Albums (FIMI)	88
Scottish Albums (Official Charts)	39
Spanish Albums (Promusicae)	69
UK Rock & Metal Albums (Official Charts)	3

== Certifications ==
Region	Certification	Certified units/sales
Canada (Music Canada)	Gold	50,000^{^}
France (SNEP)	Gold	100,000^{*}
Italy (FIMI)	Platinum	200,000
Italy (FIMI) since 2009	Gold	25,000^{‡}
Poland (ZPAV)	Gold	10,000^{‡}
United Kingdom (BPI)	Gold	100,000^{^}
^{*} Sales figures based on certification alone.^{^} Shipments figures based on certification alone.^{‡} Sales+streaming figures based on certification alone.
