= Guido Karp =

German music photographer (born 1963)

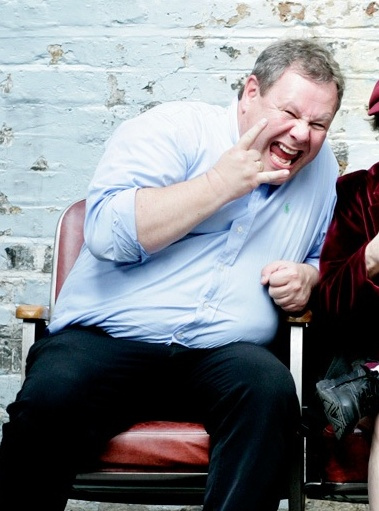
Karp in 2008

Guido Karp (born 23 January 1963) is a German music photographer.

== Biography ==
Karp was born in Mayen and grew up in Koblenz. Even as a schoolboy, he took photos of artists and concerts for the school newspaper of the Eichendorff-Gymnasium. The photo of the German comedian Otto Waalkes was first published in the Rhein-Zeitung paper in 1976. A year later, several photos of the then 14-year-old were part of a group exhibition in the Liebfrauenkirche in Koblenz. The advertising photographer Hans Joachim Bischoff became Karp's mentor at this time. In 1978 Karp had his first exhibition at "Le Café" in Boppard. He made his first record cover for Thomas Anders' record "Ich will nicht Dein Leben" (I do not want your life)".

Immediately after successfully graduating from high school, Karp entered the photo scene and worked as a freelancer for Bravo and Bild newspaper, where Karp published his first cover photo of the UK band Wham!.

In 1984 Karp began studying journalism in Mainz, which he gave up in favor of studying photo design in Darmstadt.

In 1986 Karp completed an internship at Newton Studios in Sydney. In the same year, he photographed a concert tour in Australia for the first time - Elton John and the Melbourne Symphony Orchestra. A photo from this series became the cover of the single "Candle in the Wind." Through his contacts in the European music media, Karp became "the man" for syndicating images of Australian pop and rock'n'roll bands in Europe, to continue as tour photographer of AC/DC, Modern Talking, Genesis, John Farnham and Michael Jackson. Guido Karp also worked for Tokio Hotel, Bon Jovi, HIM, Backstreet Boys, Dire Straits, Tina Turner, Rammstein. He photographed up to 250 shows a year back then.

To date, Guido Karp has taken the cover photos for more than 1,000 music CDs and DVDs, including the cover photo of the world's best-selling single "Elton John - Candle in the Wind 1997" as well as that of the world's best-selling music DVD "Robbie Williams – Live at the Albert".

In 1988 Karp founded the concert photo agency "The FAN Association" together with his assistant, Oliver Brenneisen. The name "The FAN Association" refers to the fact that this agency, unlike classic photo agencies, not only sold its photos to print media and other media but also directly to concert-goers based on world-exclusive license agreements with the artists depicted. The first three projects of "The FAN Association" were photo series by Spandau Ballet, Howard Carpendale, and "The Wall" with Pink Floyd at Potsdamer Platz in Berlin. In the year 2000, as part of internationalization, the agency had to be renamed "FansUNITED" because the word "association" is reserved for charitable organizations about a company name in New Zealand and Canada.

Between 2001 and 2009, there was a collaboration between Guido Karp and the director and light artist Gert Hof, whose worldwide mega-events Karp photographed. Recordings of him appeared in the two Gert Hof photo books "Obsessions" (2003) and "Leasing the Sky" (2006).

Since 2002, Guido Karp has been the lead photographer of the internationally most successful before-and-after show "Princess for one day" (P41D) and is a regular tutorial guest at the photo fair "Photokina", which was the world market leader at the time but has since been discontinued. Karp continues his audience-oriented performances as part of national and international workshop series.

On Dec 28, 2004, Guido Karp married his second (and current) wife, Nicole, born Iwwerks.

Since 2006, Karp has been involved in the project he initiated, "Photography instead of violence in schools."

In 2018, Karp suffered a second stroke, which limited him physically for a time. However, by the time Photokina took place in May, he had already recovered so well that he could fully fulfill his duties as host of the main stage. Extensive photographic tour accompaniment followed, e.g., Mark Knopfler and Alphaville, mainly in the USA.

On 14 March 2020, Karp's business reached a standstill due to the COVID lockdown in Germany. After a break and reorientation, Karp focused on #karpademy – a scholarship in which Karp supported ten state-sponsored photographers for one year, photographically and as a commercial mentor.

In 2020, Karp toured Germany with the #kuenstlerhelfen charity project and – due to COVID-19 travel restrictions – mainly photographed German artists such as The Scorpions, Thomas Anders and Thomas D. The autographed exhibits are to be sold to benefit those "forgotten" by the system – roadies, vendors, and caterers of the Artist Tour family. The aim was to collect money for the needy.

On Feb 29, 2024, the Isle of Man Post Office released an eight-piece commemorative stamp set to honor the life and work of the late Maurice Gibb CBE of The Bee Gees www.iompost.com/MauriceGibb. As always with Isle of Man Post Office stamps, the images were personally approved by King Charles III. All eight images were photographed by Guido Karp.

== Awards ==
Guido Karp was nominated as Music Photographer of the Year in 1987, 1988, and 1992, winning in 1988 and 1992 in the categories "Best Concert Photography"

== Notable credits (cover photographs) ==
- AC/DC: Black Ice
- Bee Gees: Live in Berlin
- Dire Straits: On Every Street
- Elton John: Candle in the wind
- Garou: Seul... avec vous
- Genesis: Live in Rome
- Helene Fischer: Live
- Howard Carpendale: Live in Berlin
- Iron Maiden: A Real Dead One
- Manowar: Gods of War
- Michael Jackson: This is it
- Münchener Freiheit: XVII
- Paul McCartney: Paul is Live
- Phil Collins: The first final farewell tour
- Robbie Williams: Live at the Albert
- Robbie Williams: Supreme
- Rolling Stones: No Security
- Roxette: live in Zurich
- Pur (band): Live 1
- Sting: Soul Cages
- Thomas Anders: This Time
- Take That: The Ultimate Tour
- Take That: Beautiful World Live
- Tina Turner: All the best

== Books ==
- Guido Karp: Volume IV (2004)
- Guido Karp: Music for your eyes (2006), ISBN 978-3-8238-1416-0
- Guido Karp: The Nudes - Photography with a Cyber-shot Mobile, ISBN 3-89602-783-2
- Guido Karp: Singvögel (2009), ISBN TBA
- Guido Karp/ Thomas Anders (2015) - We had a dream ISBN 9780989812993
