= Wasting Love =

Single by Iron Maiden

from the album Fear of the Dark
- B-side: "Tailgunner" (live); "Holy Smoke" (live); "The Assassin" (live)
- Released: 1 September 1992
- Recorded: 1991 – April 1992
- Studio: Barnyard (Essex)
- Genre: Heavy metal
- Length: 4:52; 5:46 (album version)
- Label: EMI
- Songwriter(s): Bruce Dickinson; Janick Gers
- Producer(s): Martin Birch; Steve Harris

Iron Maiden singles chronology
"From Here to Eternity" (1992)	"Wasting Love" (1992)	"Fear of the Dark (live)" (1993)

Music video
- "Wasting Love" on YouTube

"Wasting Love" is a song by the English heavy metal band Iron Maiden. It is the third single from their ninth studio album, Fear of the Dark, released in 1992.

== Synopsis ==
The song was a collaboration of singer Bruce Dickinson, and guitarist Janick Gers. The lyrics deal with the subject of loneliness brought on by sex outside the context of love.

The single was only officially released in the Netherlands, although different one-track promotional CDs exist, one for U.S. radio stations and another for Spain, which had the only vinyl version of the single.

The single cover is the third Iron Maiden single not to feature the band's iconic mascot Eddie on the front cover (the previous examples being "Running Free (live)" and "From Here to Eternity"). The cover photo alludes to the music video, which portrays a man tattooing the names of women all over his body. The song's video was directed by Samuel Bayer.

The guitar solo in "Wasting Love" is played by Janick Gers.

== B-sides ==
The B-side features three live tracks recorded at London's Wembley Arena on the "No Prayer On The Road" tour to support the No Prayer for the Dying album in 1990. These live recordings of "Tailgunner", "Holy Smoke" and "The Assassin" are also available on a very rare Australian digi-pack (CD) version of the Fear of the Dark album that was released to promote the Australian leg of the tour in 1992.

== Track listing ==
CD-Maxi Single

No.	Title	Writer(s)	Length
1.	"Wasting Love" (radio edit)	Bruce Dickinson; Janick Gers	4:52
2.	"Tailgunner" (live at Wembley Arena, London, England, 17 December 1990)	Steve Harris; Dickinson	4:04
3.	"Holy Smoke" (live at Wembley Arena, London, England, 17 December 1990)	Harris; Dickinson	3:34
4.	"The Assassin" (live at Wembley Arena, London, England, 17 December 1990)	Harris	4:25

7" Canada Single

Side one
No.	Title	Writer(s)	Length
1.	"Wasting Love" (radio edit)	Dickinson; Gers	4:52

Side two
No.	Title	Writer(s)	Length
2.	"Wasting Love" (album version)	Dickinson; Gers	5:46

== Personnel ==
- Bruce Dickinson – vocals
- Dave Murray – guitar
- Janick Gers – guitar
- Steve Harris – bass guitar
- Nicko McBrain – drums

== Chart performance ==
Chart (1992)	Peak position
AOR Tracks (Radio & Records)	57
