= Real Live Tour =

1993 concert tour by Iron Maiden

- Tour by Iron Maiden
- Official tour advertisement for the band's performance in Berlin, 11 April 1993
- Start date: 25 March 1993
- End date: 28 August 1993
- No. of shows: 46 in total

Iron Maiden concert chronology
- Fear of the Dark Tour (1992); Real Live Tour (1993); The X Factour (1995–1996)

The Real Live Tour was a concert tour by the English heavy metal band Iron Maiden from 25 March 1993 to 28 August 1993.

== Background ==
It was the last tour which featured lead vocalist Bruce Dickinson before his return to the band in 1999, leaving to pursue a solo career, his final shows taking place at Pinewood Studios and filmed for the live video, Raising Hell.

As he had already announced his plans to leave before the tour began, Dickinson states that the concerts were extremely challenging, explaining that "we walked out onstage and it was like a morgue. The Maiden fans knew I'd quit, they knew these were the last gigs, and I suddenly realised that, as the frontman, you're in an almost impossible situation. If you're like, 'Wow, this is really fucking cool tonight, man,' they're all gonna sit there going, 'What a wanker. He's leaving. How can it be cool?' Or do you go on and say, 'Look, I'm really sorry I'm leaving – not to put a damper on the evening, but I am quitting'? I mean, what do you do?" Bassist Steve Harris claims that, during the less high-profile shows, Dickinson would deliberately underperform, sometimes just mumbling into the microphone, although Dickinson has since denied the allegations. On 1 May 1993 the band performed at Primo Maggio Free Festival in Rome, Piazza San Giovanni. According to different sources, the crowd was estimated at 500,000 to one million people in attendance. Iron Maiden toured an extensive Italian leg and visited Russia for the very first time, playing three consecutive nights at Moscow's Olympic Stadium.

== Tour dates ==
List of 1993 concerts
Date	City	Country	Venue
25 March 1993	Faro	Portugal	Kadoc
27 March 1993	Madrid	Spain	Sala Canciller
28 March 1993	San Sebastián	Spain	Polideportivo Anoeta
29 March 1993	Barcelona	Spain	Zeleste
5 April 1993	Ostrava	Czech Republic	Ostravar Aréna
6 April 1993	Bratislava	Slovakia	Ondrej Nepela Arena
7 April 1993	Vienna	Austria	Wiener Stadthalle
9 April 1993	Arnhem	Netherlands	Rijnhal
10 April 1993	Paris	France	Élysée Montmartre
11 April 1993	Berlin	Germany	Neue Welt
13 April 1993	Würzburg	Germany	Carl-Diem-Halle
15 April 1993	Hanover	Germany	Music Hall
16 April 1993	Bremen	Germany	Stadthalle
17 April 1993	Essen	Germany	Grugahalle
19 April 1993	Stuttgart	Germany	Hanns-Martin-Schleyer-Halle
20 April 1993	Saarbrücken	Germany	Saarlandhalle
21 April 1993	Augsburg	Germany	Schwabenhalle
23 April 1993	Gothenburg	Sweden	Scandinavium
25 April 1993	Bourges	France	Pavillon
27 April 1993	Turin	Italy	Palasport
28 April 1993	Majano	Italy	Campo Sportivo
29 April 1993	Florence	Italy	Palasport
30 April 1993	Rome	Italy	Palaghiaccio
1 May 1993	Rome	Italy	Palaghiaccio
2 May 1993	Priolo Gargallo	Italy	Palasport
~~3 May 1993~~	~~Reggio Calabria~~	Italy	~~Palasport~~
5 May 1993	Naples	Italy	Teatro Tenda
6 May 1993	Bologna	Italy	Parc Nord
8 May 1993	Genoa	Italy	Palasport di Genova
9 May 1993	Milan	Italy	Forum di Assago
11 May 1993	Toulon	France	Zénith Oméga de Toulon
13 May 1993	Grenoble	France	Summum
14 May 1993	Nancy	France	Zénith de Nancy
16 May 1993	Sheffield	England	Sheffield Arena
17 May 1993	London	England	Wembley Arena
19 May 1993	Manchester	England	G-Mex
20 May 1993	Birmingham	England	NEC Arena
21 May 1993	Glasgow	Scotland	Scottish Exhibition and Conference Centre
23 May 1993	Dublin	Ireland	The Point
24 May 1993	Belfast	Northern Ireland	King's Hall
27 May 1993	Neuchâtel	Switzerland	Patinoire du Littoral
2 June 1993	Moscow	Russia	Olympic Stadium
3 June 1993	Moscow	Russia	Olympic Stadium
4 June 1993	Moscow	Russia	Olympic Stadium
27 August 1993	London	England	Pinewood Studios
28 August 1993	London	England	Pinewood Studios

=== Cancelled and rescheduled dates ===
- 30 March 1993: Berlin, Germany, Huxley's Neue Welt (rescheduled to 11 April.)
- 2 April 1993: Moscow, Russia, Olympic Hall (rescheduled to 2 June.)
- 3 April 1993: Moscow, Russia, Olympic Hall (rescheduled to 3 June.)
- 4 April 1993: Moscow, Russia, Olympic Hall (rescheduled to 4 June.)
- 3 May 1993: Reggio de Calabria, Italy, Palasport (due to insufficient security.)
