= Palaghiaccio di Marino =

Former multi-purpose arena in Marino, Italy

Coordinates: 41.77346°N 12.61164°E

Palaghiaccio di Marino was a 5,000-capacity multi-purpose facility located in Marino, Italy, near Rome. It opened in 1990 and closed in 2015. Many international artists performed at Palaghiaccio di Marino such as Van Halen, Metallica, Nirvana, Peter Gabriel, Iron Maiden and Deep Purple.
