= Fear of the Dark Tour =

1992 concert tour by Iron Maiden

- Tour by Iron Maiden
- Official tour advertisement for the band's performance in Stockholm, 29 August
- Associated album: Fear of the Dark
- Start date: 3 June 1992
- End date: 4 November 1992
- No. of shows: 66 in total (67 scheduled)

Iron Maiden concert chronology
- No Prayer on the Road (1990–1991); Fear of the Dark Tour (1992); Real Live Tour (1993)

The Fear of the Dark Tour was a concert tour by the English heavy metal band Iron Maiden from 3 June 1992 to 4 November 1992.

Supporting acts on this tour included Testament, Corrosion of Conformity, W.A.S.P, Warrant, Thunder, Coda, Face to Face (not to be confused with punk rock band from California) and a then-lesser known Dream Theater.

The tour saw Iron Maiden perform in Iceland for the first time, and they would make a return headline appearance at the Monsters of Rock festival at Donington Park, which they headlined before a reduced crowd of 75,000 (the audience being capped after an incident in 1988 where two fans were crushed to death). This performance, which featured a guest appearance by then-former guitarist Adrian Smith during "Running Free", was released in 1993 in audio and video formats.

The tour was also notable as the band attempted to play their first shows in Chile, but were forced to cancel after complaints from the Catholic Church.

== Tour dates ==
List of 1992 concerts
Date	City	Country	Venue
3 June 1992^{[A]}	Norwich	England	The Oval Rock House
5 June 1992	Reykjavík	Iceland	Laugardalshöll
8 June 1992	New York City	United States	The Ritz
11 June 1992	Rochester	United States	Rochester Community War Memorial
13 June 1992	Quebec City	Canada	Colisée de Québec
14 June 1992	Ottawa	Canada	Coliseum at Lansdowne Park
16 June 1992	Montreal	Canada	Montreal Forum
17 June 1992	Toronto	Canada	CNE Coliseum
19 June 1992	Cuyahoga Falls	United States	Blossom Music Center
20 June 1992	Clarkston	United States	Pine Knob Music Theatre
21 June 1992	Tinley Park	United States	World Music Theater
22 June 1992	East Troy	United States	Alpine Valley Music Theatre
25 June 1992	Saint Paul	United States	Roy Wilkins Auditorium
27 June 1992	Morrison	United States	Red Rocks Amphitheatre
28 June 1992	Salt Lake City	United States	Salt Palace
30 June 1992	Sacramento	United States	Cal Expo Amphitheatre
1 July 1992	Daly City	United States	Cow Palace
2 July 1992	Irvine	United States	Irvine Meadows Amphitheatre
5 July 1992	Phoenix	United States	Compton Terrace
6 July 1992	Albuquerque	United States	Tingley Coliseum
7 July 1992	San Antonio	United States	Freeman Coliseum
8 July 1992	Dallas	United States	Coca-Cola Starplex Amphitheatre
9 July 1992	Bonner Springs	United States	Sandstone Center for the Performing Arts
11 July 1992	Atlanta	United States	Lakewood Amphitheater
12 July 1992	Charlotte	United States	Blockbuster Pavilion Charlotte
14 July 1992	Maryland Heights	United States	Riverport Amphitheater
15 July 1992	Nashville	United States	Starwood Amphitheatre
17 July 1992	Sunrise	United States	Sunrise Musical Theater
~~23 July 1992~~	Santiago	Chile	Estación Mapocho
25 July 1992	Buenos Aires	Argentina	Estadio Arquitecto Ricardo Etcheverry
28 July 1992	Montevideo	Uruguay	Estación Central General Artigas
31 July 1992	Rio de Janeiro	Brazil	Ginásio do Maracanãzinho
1 August 1992	São Paulo	Brazil	Estádio Palestra Itália
4 August 1992	Porto Alegre	Brazil	Gigantinho
15 August 1992	Mannheim	Germany	Maimarktgelände
17 August 1992	Brussels	Belgium	Forest National
22 August 1992^{[B]}	Castle Donington	England	Donington Park
25 August 1992	Copenhagen	Denmark	Valby-Hallen
27 August 1992	Helsinki	Finland	Helsinki Ice Hall
29 August 1992	Stockholm	Sweden	Stockholm Globe Arena
31 August 1992	Oslo	Norway	Oslo Spektrum
2 September 1992	Den Bosch	Netherlands	Brabanthal
4 September 1992	Lausanne	Switzerland	Patinoire de Malley
5 September 1992	Paris	France	Parc de la Villette
7 September 1992	Mulhouse	France	Palais des Sports
8 September 1992	Annecy	France	Parc des Expositions
10 September 1992	Béziers	France	Les Arènes
12 September 1992^{[B]}	Reggio Emilia	Italy	Arena Festa Dell' Unita
14 September 1992^{[B]}	Barcelona	Spain	Plaza de toros de las Arenas
17 September 1992^{[B]}	San Sebastián	Spain	Velódromo de Anoeta
18 September 1992^{[B]}	Madrid	Spain	Las Ventas
19 September 1992^{[B]}	Zaragoza	Spain	Plaza de Toros de Zaragoza
26 September 1992	Bayamón	Puerto Rico	Juan Ramón Loubriel Stadium
1 October 1992	Mexico City	Mexico	Palacio de los Deportes
2 October 1992	Mexico City	Mexico	Palacio de los Deportes
4 October 1992	Guadalajara	Mexico	Estadio Jalisco
9 October 1992	Caracas	Venezuela	Poliedro de Caracas
10 October 1992	Caracas	Venezuela	Poliedro de Caracas
20 October 1992	Auckland	New Zealand	Logan Campbell Centre
22 October 1992	Melbourne	Australia	Festival Hall
23 October 1992	Sydney	Australia	Hordern Pavilion
26 October 1992	Nagoya	Japan	Nagoya Rainbow Hall
28 October 1992	Fukuoka	Japan	Kōsei Nenkin Kaikan
30 October 1992	Hiroshima	Japan	Kōsei Nenkin Kaikan
1 November 1992	Osaka	Japan	Archaic Hall
2 November 1992	Osaka	Japan	Festival Hall
3 November 1992	Yokohama	Japan	Yokohama Cultural Gymnasium
4 November 1992	Tokyo	Japan	Yoyogi National Gymnasium

Festivals and other miscellaneous performances
^{A} This concert was a secret show under the name "The Nodding Donkeys"
^{B} This concert was a part of "Monsters of Rock"

Cancelled and rescheduled dates

- 23 July 1992: Santiago, Chile, Estación Mapocho; cancelled following complaints from the Catholic Church.
- 15 September 1992: San Sebastian, Spain, Velodrome; rescheduled to 17 September.
- 17 September 1992: Caceres, Spain; cancelled.
