= Valby-Hallen =

Indoor arena in Copenhagen, Denmark

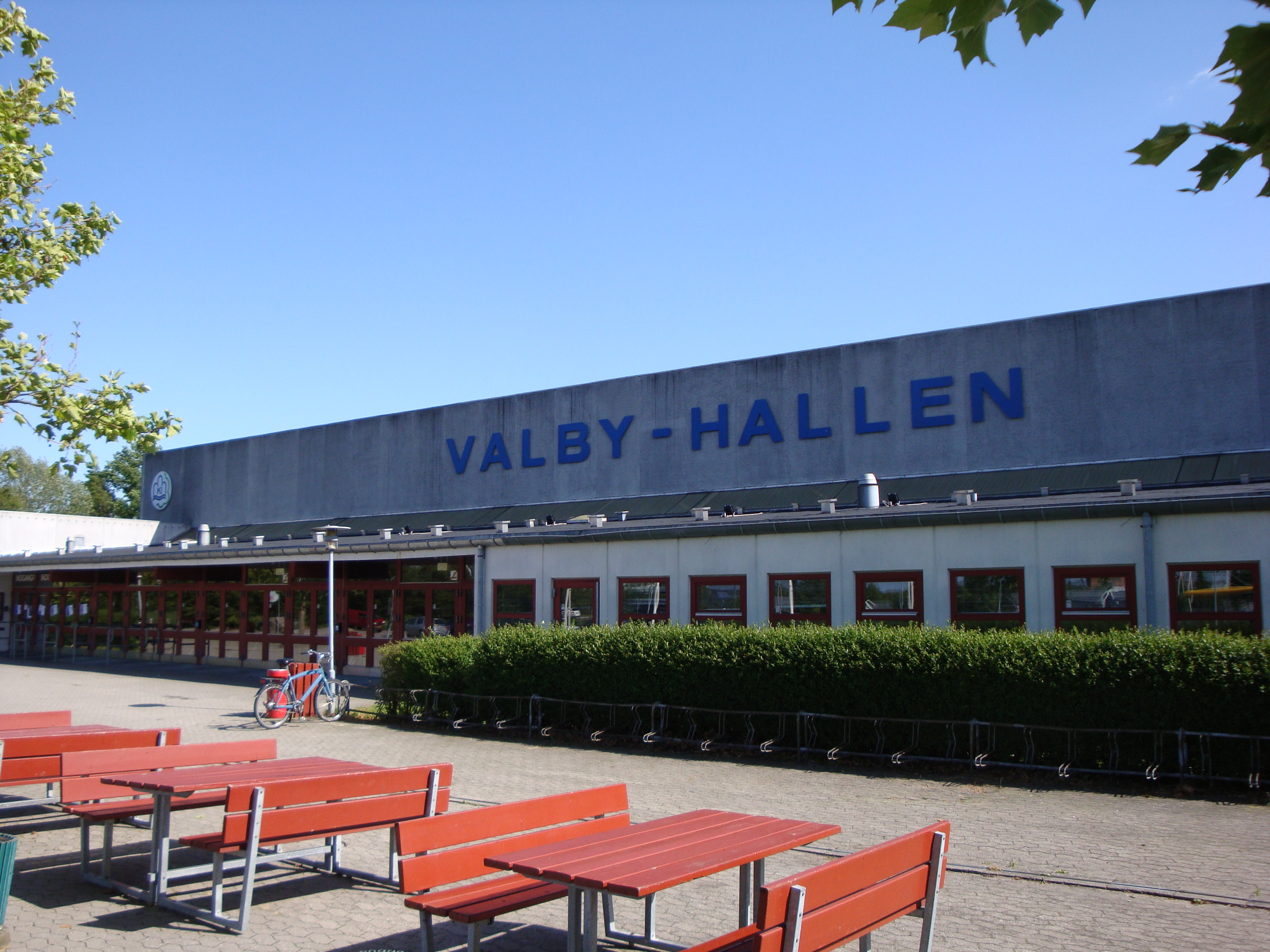
- An external view of Valby-Hallen
- Interactive map of Valby-Hallen
- Address: Julius Andersens Vej 3, Copenhagen, Denmark
- Coordinates: 55.649°N 12.516°E
- Capacity: 5,000
- Type: Indoor arena
- Event: Various

Construction
- Built: 1984

Website
- kulturv.kk.dk/valbyhallen

Valby-Hallen is a multi-purpose indoor arena located in Copenhagen, Denmark.

The venue is primarily used for sports and concerts. It has a capacity of 5,000 people.

Musicians like Bee Gees, ZZ Top, Iron Maiden, Phil Collins, Smashing Pumpkins, Ace of Base, Oasis, Coldplay, Depeche Mode, Radiohead, Pet Shop Boys and Little Mix have performed in Valby Hallen.
