= From Here to Eternity (Iron Maiden song) =

Single by Iron Maiden

from the album Fear of the Dark
- B-side: "I Can't See My Feelings"; "Roll Over Vic Vella"; "No Prayer for the Dying (Live)"; "Public Enema Number One (Live)"
- Released: 29 June 1992
- Recorded: 1992
- Genre: Heavy metal
- Length: 3:37
- Label: EMI
- Songwriter: Steve Harris

Iron Maiden singles chronology
"Be Quick or Be Dead" (1992)	"From Here to Eternity" (1992)	"Wasting Love" (1992)

12" Poster-Bag cover

Picture Disc cover

"From Here to Eternity" is a song by English heavy metal band Iron Maiden, released as the second single from their album Fear of the Dark, released in 1992.

== Synopsis ==
The song is the fourth and most recent song in the ongoing saga of "Charlotte the Harlot" (other songs include "Charlotte the Harlot," "22 Acacia Avenue," "Hooks in You”). The song tells the tale of Charlotte going on a fateful motorcycle ride with the Devil.

This is the first studio single to not feature Eddie in the artwork - second overall, after the live version of "Running Free" - using a picture of the song's music video instead, and it is one of two single from Fear of the Dark to not feature the mascot, the other being "Wasting Love". The cover of the 7" Etched Disc is the cover most people associate with the single, though the 12" was a very different picture from the clip. The CD Maxi used the 7" etched cover, but a different shot again from the clip is on the Netherlands release of the CD.

The single was released in several formats: 7" etched disc with the tracks on one side and an image etched into the other; 7" cut to shape picture disc; 12" with fold-out sleeve; and a cd-single.

It charted and peaked at #21 on the UK Singles Chart.

== B-sides ==
"Roll Over Vic Vella" is a cover of Chuck Berry's "Roll Over Beethoven" featuring spoken intro and outro pieces by longtime Iron Maiden roadie and friend Vic Vella talking with Steve Harris and producer; Martin Birch. The song appeared on all formats except the 7" shaped picture disc which featured "I Can't See My Feelings", a cover of the Welsh band Budgie from their 1975 album Bandolier. The song didn't appear on any digital format until 1995 when Fear of the Dark was reissued with a bonus CD containing b-sides from the album's singles. The live versions of "Public Enema No One" and "No Prayer for the Dying" on these singles are the only time either has appeared live on any Iron Maiden release.

== Track listing ==
7" Etched Single

Side One
No.	Title	Writer(s)	Length
1.	"From Here to Eternity"	Steve Harris	3:37

Side Two
No.	Title	Writer(s)	Length
2.	"Roll Over Vic Vella" (Chuck Berry Cover) (With Different Lyrics)	Berry	4:46

7" Pictured Single

Side One
No.	Title	Writer(s)	Length
1.	"From Here to Eternity"	Harris	3:37

Side Two
No.	Title	Writer(s)	Length
2.	"I Can't See My Feelings" (Budgie Cover)	Burke Shelley, Tony Bourge	3:50

12" Single

Side One
No.	Title	Writer(s)	Length
1.	"From Here to Eternity"	Harris	3:37

Side Two
No.	Title	Writer(s)	Length
2.	"Roll Over Vic Vella" (Chuck Berry Cover) (With Different Lyrics)	Berry	4:46
3.	"No Prayer for the Dying" (Live at the Wembley Arena, London, England, 17 December 1990)	Harris	4:23

CD-Maxi Single

No.	Title	Writer(s)	Length
1.	"From Here to Eternity"	Harris	3:37
2.	"Roll Over Vic Vella" (Chuck Berry Cover) (With Different Lyrics)	Berry	4:46
3.	"Public Enema Number One" (Live at the Wembley Arena, London, England, 17 December 1990)	Bruce Dickinson, Dave Murray	3:57
4.	"No Prayer for the Dying" (Live at the Wembley Arena, London, England, 17 December 1990)	Harris	4:23

== Personnel ==
- Bruce Dickinson – vocals
- Dave Murray – guitar
- Janick Gers – guitar
- Steve Harris – bass
- Nicko McBrain – drums

== Chart performance ==
Chart (1992)	Peak position
Australia (ARIA)	109
Europe (Eurochart Hot 100)	54
Irish Singles Chart	27
UK Singles Chart	21
