= Be Quick or Be Dead =

1992 single by Iron Maiden

Single by Iron Maiden

from the album Fear of the Dark
- B-side: "Nodding Donkey Blues"; "Space Station #5"; "Bayswater Ain't a Bad Place to Be"
- Released: 13 April 1992
- Genre: Heavy metal, speed metal
- Length: 3:24
- Label: EMI
- Songwriters: Bruce Dickinson; Janick Gers
- Producers: Martin Birch; Steve Harris

Iron Maiden singles chronology
"Bring Your Daughter... to the Slaughter" (1990)	"Be Quick or Be Dead" (1992)	"From Here to Eternity" (1992)

"Be Quick or Be Dead" is a song by English heavy metal band Iron Maiden, released as the first single from their ninth studio album, Fear of the Dark, on 13 April 1992. The single peaked at No. 2 on the UK Singles Chart and in Finland while reaching the top 10 in Denmark, Ireland, and Norway.

== Synopsis ==
The song is about several political scandals taking place at the time of its release, including the Robert Maxwell banking scandal (band mascot Eddie is seen with Maxwell on the single cover), European stock market crashes, and the BCCI case. It was released a month prior to the album and reached No. 2 on the UK Singles Chart. The song is faster and heavier than most Iron Maiden songs, and is the band's first single co-written by Janick Gers.

The B-side features two official songs and one hidden track, including an original blues number ("Nodding Donkey Blues") and Montrose cover ("Space Station No. 5"), and the unlisted "Bayswater Ain't a Bad Place to Be". The last is a spoken word comedy piece by Bruce Dickinson (along with acoustic guitar accompaniment from Janick Gers) in which he imitates and makes fun of Maiden manager Rod Smallwood. A similar mockery of Smallwood was released before, as a B-side titled "Sheriff of Huddersfield", which was available on the "Wasted Years" single.

== Track listings ==
7-inch single

Side One
No.	Title	Writer(s)	Length
1.	"Be Quick or Be Dead"	Bruce Dickinson, Janick Gers	3:24

Side Two
No.	Title	Writer(s)	Length
2.	"Nodding Donkey Blues"	Steve Harris, Dickinson, Gers, Dave Murray, Nicko McBrain	3:11

12-inch single

Side One
No.	Title	Writer(s)	Length
1.	"Be Quick or Be Dead"	Dickinson, Gers	3:24

Side Two
No.	Title	Writer(s)	Length
2.	"Nodding Donkey Blues"	Harris, Dickinson, Gers, Murray, McBrain	3:11
3.	"Space Station No. 5" (Montrose Cover)	Ronnie Montrose, Sammy Hagar	3:47

UK 12-inch single

Side One
No.	Title	Writer(s)	Length
1.	"Be Quick or Be Dead"	Dickinson, Gers	3:24
2.	"Bayswater Ain't a Bad Place to Be" (Hidden Track)	Dickinson, Gers	8:05

Side Two
No.	Title	Writer(s)	Length
3.	"Nodding Donkey Blues"	Harris, Dickinson, Gers, Murray, McBrain	3:11
4.	"Space Station No. 5" (Montrose Cover)	Montrose, Hagar	3:47

CD single

No.	Title	Writer(s)	Length
1.	"Be Quick or Be Dead"	Dickinson, Gers	3:24
2.	"Nodding Donkey Blues"	Harris, Dickinson, Gers, Murray, McBrain	3:11
3.	"Space Station No. 5" (Montrose Cover)	Montrose, Hagar	3:47

UK CD single

No.	Title	Writer(s)	Length
1.	"Be Quick or Be Dead"	Dickinson, Gers	3:24
2.	"Nodding Donkey Blues"	Harris, Dickinson, Gers, Murray, McBrain	3:11
3.	"Space Station No. 5" (Montrose Cover; includes hidden track "Bayswater Ain't a Bad Place to Be")	Montrose, Hagar	11:57

French CD maxi-single

No.	Title	Writer(s)	Length
1.	"Be Quick or Be Dead"	Dickinson, Gers	3:24
2.	"Nodding Donkey Blues"	Harris, Dickinson, Gers, Murray, McBrain	3:11
3.	"Space Station No. 5" (Montrose Cover)	Montrose, Hagar	3:47
4.	"The French Message From Bruce Dickinson"	Dickinson	1:02

== Personnel ==
Production credits are adapted from the 7 inch single and picture disc covers.

Iron Maiden

- Bruce Dickinson – vocals
- Dave Murray – guitar
- Janick Gers – guitar
- Steve Harris – bass guitar, producer
- Nicko McBrain – drums

Production

- Martin Birch – producer
- Derek Riggs – sleeve illustration
- Mike Prior – photography
- George Chin – photography

== Charts ==
=== Weekly charts ===
Chart (1992)	Peak position
Australia (ARIA)	47
Belgium (Ultratop 50 Flanders)	47
Denmark (IFPI)	5
Europe (Eurochart Hot 100)	12
Finland (Suomen virallinen lista)	2
Germany (GfK)	32
Ireland (IRMA)	10
Netherlands (Dutch Top 40)	27
Netherlands (Single Top 100)	26
New Zealand (Recorded Music NZ)	12
Norway (VG-lista)	3
Sweden (Sverigetopplistan)	15
Switzerland (Schweizer Hitparade)	15
UK Singles (OCC)	2

=== Year-end charts ===
Chart (1992)	Position
Sweden (Topplistan)	98

== Release history ==
Region	Date	Format(s)	Label(s)	Ref.
United Kingdom	13 April 1992	7-inch vinyl; 12-inch vinyl; CD	EMI	
Australia	27 May 1992	CD; cassette	EMI	
Japan	10 June 1992	CD	EMI	
