= Bring Your Daughter... to the Slaughter =

1989 song by Bruce Dickinson

Song by Bruce Dickinson

from the album A Nightmare on Elm Street 5: The Dream Child
- Released: August 1989
- Recorded: 1989
- Genre: Heavy metal
- Length: 4:57
- Label: Jive
- Songwriter: Bruce Dickinson
- Producer: Chris Tsangarides

"Bring Your Daughter... to the Slaughter"

Single by Iron Maiden

from the album No Prayer for the Dying
- B-side: "I'm a Mover"; "Communication Breakdown"
- Released: 24 December 1990
- Genre: Heavy metal
- Length: 4:42
- Label: EMI
- Songwriter: Bruce Dickinson

Iron Maiden singles chronology
"Holy Smoke" (1990)	"Bring Your Daughter... to the Slaughter" (1990)	"Be Quick or Be Dead" (1992)

Alternate cover

"Bring Your Daughter... to the Slaughter" is the second single from the 1990 Iron Maiden album No Prayer for the Dying. The song was originally recorded and released by Bruce Dickinson for the soundtrack to A Nightmare on Elm Street 5: The Dream Child, but Steve Harris liked it so Iron Maiden rerecorded it. It is the only UK number-one single for the band to date, in spite of the fact that it received very little airplay on the BBC. The song also topped the Finnish Singles Chart and reached number six in Ireland.

== Background ==
In 1989, while Iron Maiden were taking a break from touring, Zomba asked Dickinson to write a song for A Nightmare on Elm Street 5: The Dream Child. Teaming up with former Gillan (and future Iron Maiden) guitarist Janick Gers, Dickinson recorded the song, which he claims he wrote "in about three minutes," and the project was expanded into an album, Tattooed Millionaire. Upon hearing the completed track, Steve Harris decided that it would be "great for Maiden" and convinced Dickinson not to put it on his solo album.

The original version of the song, which won a Golden Raspberry Award for "Worst Original Song" in 1989, is, according to Dickinson, "substantially different to the Iron Maiden version," explaining that "the arrangement is identical, but mine's kind of... slinky. Maiden's just really goes for it." Dickinson's original version was included on disc 2 of The Best of Bruce Dickinson in 2001.

Bruce Dickinson said "We're going to release this as a single on Christmas Eve to scare the living daylights out of Cliff Richard". Due to not being officially released until the week of Christmas, it went straight to number one on the UK Singles Chart on 30 December 1990. This was in spite of a ban by the BBC, who refused to play the song on Radio 1 and showed at least 2 minutes of the live clip for Top of the Pops. The B-side features cover versions of "I'm a Mover" (originally by Free) and Led Zeppelin's "Communication Breakdown".

In addition to the standard 7-inch and 12-inch editions, the single was also released as a special edition 7-inch flip-top "brain pack" edition.

The music video features scenes from the 1960 horror film The City of the Dead, directed by John Llewellyn Moxey and known as Horror Hotel in North America.

Like most songs from the No Prayer for the Dying album, "Bring Your Daughter to the Slaughter" was rarely played live following the supporting tour, No Prayer on the Road. It returned to Iron Maiden's setlists for select dates in 1992, 1993 and 2003.

== Track listing ==
7-inch single

Side One
No.	Title	Writer(s)	Length
1.	"Bring Your Daughter... to the Slaughter"	Bruce Dickinson	4:42

Side Two
No.	Title	Writer(s)	Length
2.	"I'm a Mover" (Free Cover)	Andy Fraser, Paul Rodgers	3:26

12-inch single

Side One
No.	Title	Writer(s)	Length
1.	"Bring Your Daughter... to the Slaughter"	Dickinson	4:42

Side Two
No.	Title	Writer(s)	Length
2.	"I'm a Mover" (Free Cover)	Fraser, Rodgers	3:26
3.	"Communication Breakdown" (Led Zeppelin Cover)	Jimmy Page, John Bonham, John Paul Jones	2:42

== Personnel ==
Production credits are adapted from the 7 inch vinyl, and picture disc covers.

Iron Maiden

- Bruce Dickinson – vocals
- Janick Gers – guitar
- Dave Murray – guitar
- Steve Harris – bass
- Nicko McBrain – drums

Production

- Martin Birch – producer, engineer, mixing
- Derek Riggs – cover illustrations
- Ross Halfin – photography

== Charts ==
Chart (1990–1991)	Peak position
Australia (ARIA)	155
Europe (Eurochart Hot 100)	8
Finland (Suomen virallinen lista)	1
Ireland (IRMA)	6
Netherlands (Dutch Top 40)	30
Netherlands (Single Top 100)	17
New Zealand (Recorded Music NZ)	47
Switzerland (Schweizer Hitparade)	19
UK Singles (OCC)	1

== Release history ==
Region	Date	Format(s)	Label(s)	Ref.
United Kingdom	24 December 1990	7-inch vinyl; 12-inch vinyl; cassette	EMI	
Japan	23 January 1991	CD	EMI	
Australia	11 February 1991	7-inch vinyl; cassette	EMI	
