= Janick Gers =

English guitarist (born 1957)

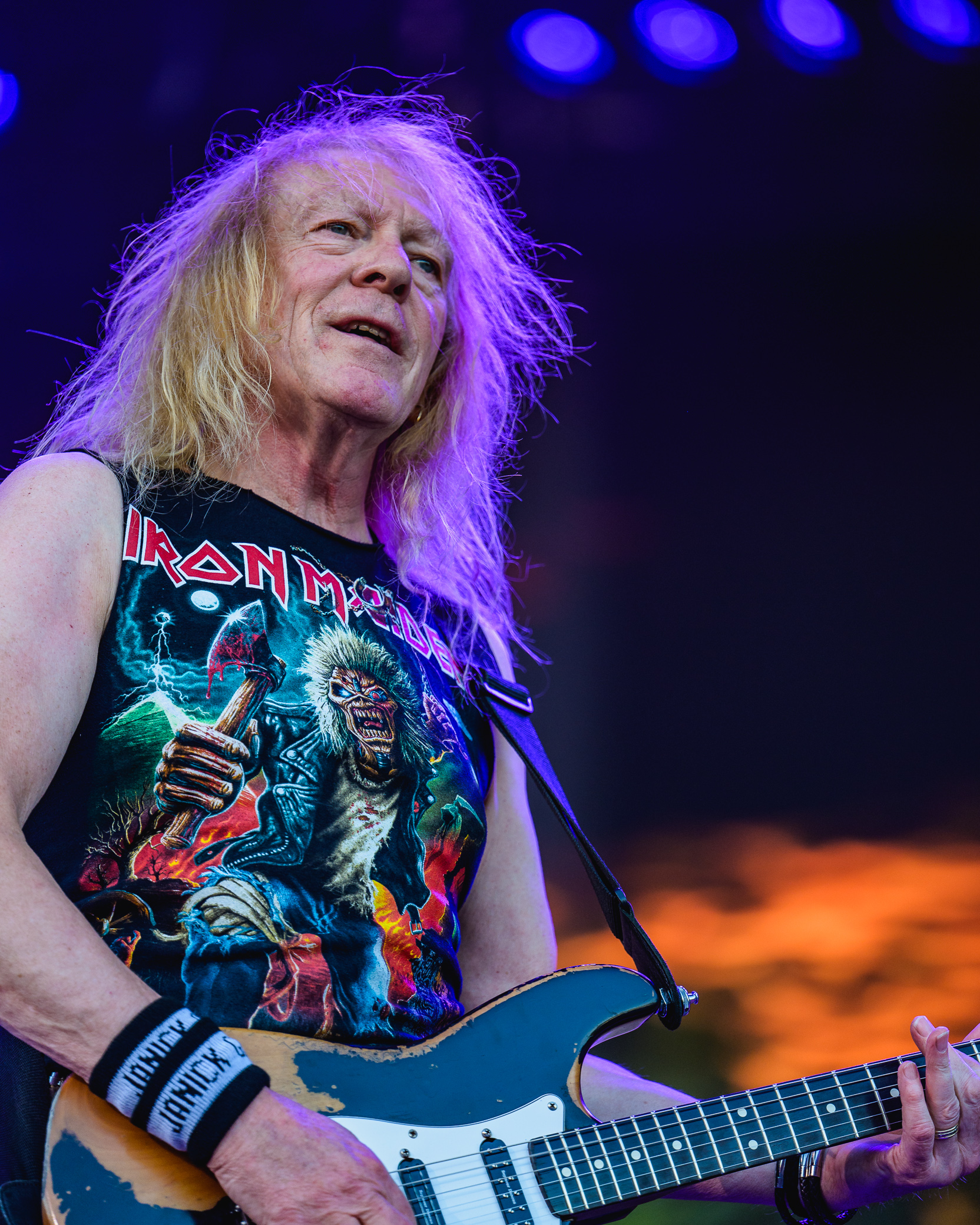
- Gers with Iron Maiden at Tons of Rock 2026

Background information
- Born: Janick Robert Gers; 27 January 1957 (age 69); Hartlepool, England
- Genres: Heavy metal; progressive rock; hard rock
- Occupation: Guitarist
- Years active: 1975–present
- Member of: Iron Maiden
- Formerly of: Gillan; White Spirit

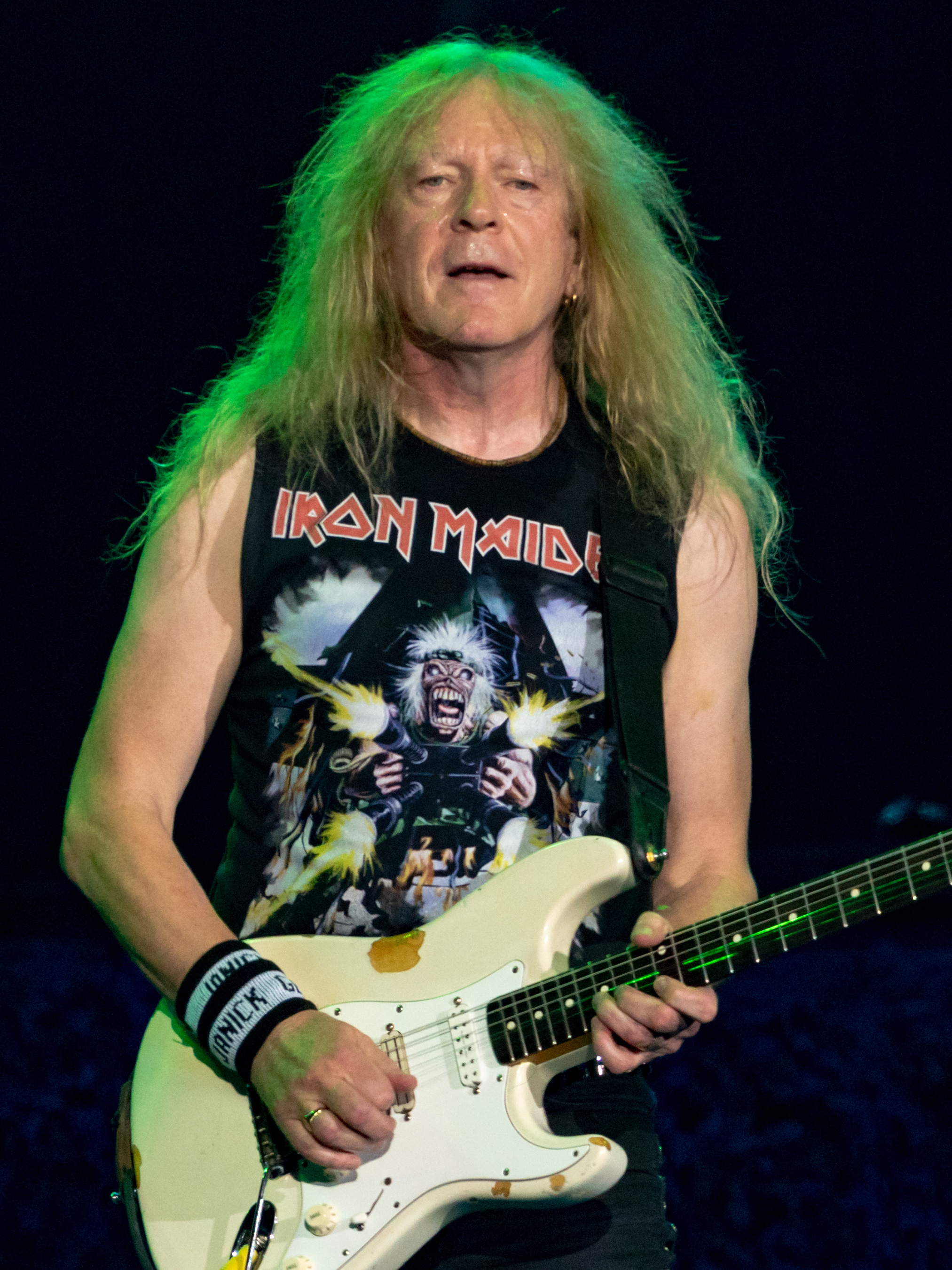
Gers at O2 Arena in 2018

Janick Robert Gers (/ˈjænɪk ˈɡɜːrz/; born 27 January 1957) is an English musician who is best known as one of the three guitarists in heavy metal band Iron Maiden since 1990. He initially joined to replace Adrian Smith, but remained in the band after Smith rejoined in 1999. Gers was previously a member of Gillan and co-founder of the band White Spirit in 1975.

== Early life ==
Janick Gers was born on January 27, 1957. He is of Polish ancestry via his father, Bolesław, who was an able seaman of the Polish Navy and served on ORP Burza and ORP Błyskawica on which he came to England during World War 2, and later he joined the Royal Navy. Bolesław Gers remained in England after the war, married Janick's British mother Lois in 1956 and had 4 children of which Janick is the oldest.

He grew up in Hartlepool and graduated from English Martyrs School and Sixth Form College in the 1970s, and earned a college degree in sociology and English literature after leaving Gillan in the 1980s.

== Career ==
Gers began his career as the lead guitarist of the new wave of British heavy metal band White Spirit, appearing on their debut self-titled album in 1980, before leaving in 1981 to join Gillan, replacing Bernie Torme in the group formed by then-former Deep Purple vocalist Ian Gillan. Gers' first performance with Gillan was on Top of the Pops, and he would go on to record two albums with the band before Gillan disbanded the group at the end of 1982.

After Gillan disbanded, and before joining Gogmagog Gers undertook a Humanities degree so he could become a teacher. However, Gers joined Gogmagog which included former Iron Maiden vocalist Paul Di'Anno and drummer Clive Burr. The project would ultimately come to nothing. Gers would later co-write and perform on the track "View from the Hill" on former Marillion vocalist Fish's first solo album, Vigil in a Wilderness of Mirrors (1990). Gers was asked to record the song "Bring Your Daughter... to the Slaughter" with Iron Maiden vocalist Bruce Dickinson for the soundtrack to A Nightmare on Elm Street 5: The Dream Child (1989); this project then expanded into Dickinson's first solo album, Tattooed Millionaire (1990).

During the recording of Tattooed Millionaire, Gers was asked to join Iron Maiden in place of Adrian Smith. He has remained with the band ever since, even after Smith rejoined the band in 1999, contributing to a total of ten studio albums. In 2026 Gers and Iron Maiden were inducted into the Rock and Roll Hall of Fame.

== Influences, musical style and performance style ==
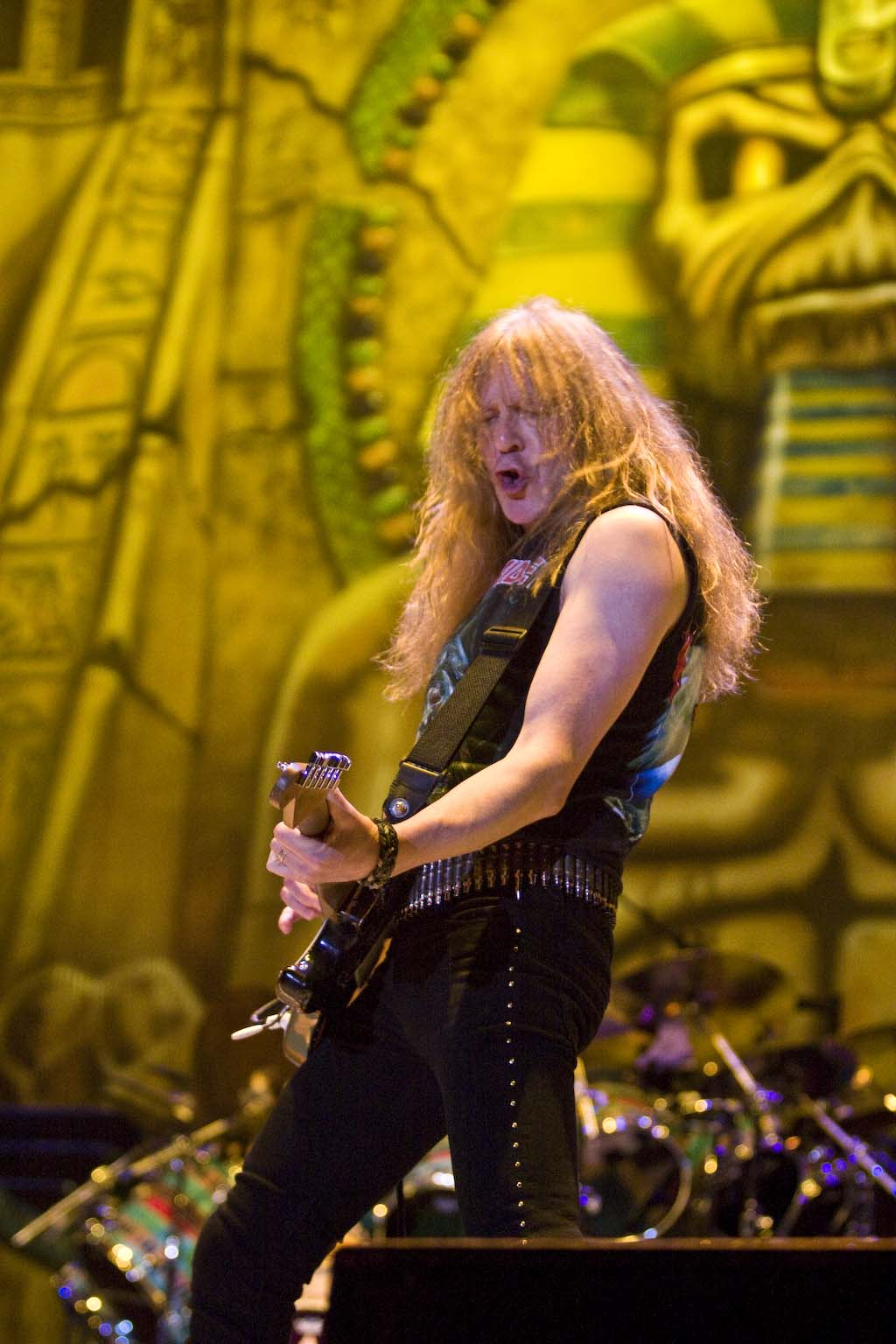
Gers performing in 2008

Gers' playing style uses heavy distortion and is noted for having a very raw tone. He prefers alternate picking instead of playing legato using hammers and pull-offs. Gers' main influences are Ritchie Blackmore, Jeff Beck and Rory Gallagher.

He is noted for his energetic stage presence, which often involves dancing, prancing, and performing tricks with his guitar, such as throwing it into the air and catching it. Gers is known for his dynamic on-stage performances, which have occasionally led to mishaps. In one instance, his guitar was catapulted off-stage during one of his antics after losing control of its neck. On another occasion, he risked serious injury by losing his footing while strutting on stage, falling violently to the ground, which caused apparent concern from bandmate Adrian Smith. While Gers plays guitar right-handed, he is naturally left-handed and can be seen signing autographs with his left hand in Iron Maiden's Rock in Rio DVD.

Along with Dave Murray and Adrian Smith (also Iron Maiden guitarists), he shares fourth place on Metal Hammer's list of the greatest metal guitarists of all time.

== Personal life ==
He has two children with his wife Sandra, and lives in Yarm, Teesside. His son Dylan also plays guitar and has released ambient post rock tracks as both a solo artist and with Noah Yorke, son of Radiohead singer Thom Yorke.

Gers has relatives in the Bydgoszcz area and Sośno village in Poland and visited them regularly as a teenager from 1972 until 1977. Gers bought his first guitar during one of those visits, in a music store in Złotów close to Piła. Gers met his Polish family again after 34 years at a 2011 concert in Warsaw.

Gers is a fan of Hartlepool United and is a season-ticket holder in the Neale Cooper Stand at Victoria Park.

Gers had an uncredited part in the BBC drama The Paradise Club in 1990, appearing as the lead guitarist of a band called Fraud Squad. He appeared in the 2010 fan-made Iron Maiden documentary Maiden Heaven.

== Musical equipment ==
Gers is a long-time proponent of the Fender Stratocaster. His guitars are typically black or white with rosewood fingerboards and Seymour Duncan JB Jr. and Hot Rails pick-ups. His favourite guitar over the years has been a black Stratocaster, equipped with JB Jr. pick-ups, which was given to him by Ian Gillan. Gers uses four different Fender Stratocasters, as well as a Gibson Chet Atkins semi-acoustic model for songs such as "Dance of Death". Gers is currently endorsed by Sandberg Guitars, and he uses a California ST-S tobacco hc-aged and a California ST-S creme hc-aged model on stage.

Like his bandmates, Dave Murray and Adrian Smith, Gers currently uses the Marshall JMP-1 preamp through a Marshall 9200 power amp. Preferring not to use foot-switches while playing, Gers' roadie operates his MIDI Foot Controller offstage. Favouring cables, Gers only uses a Shure UR4D wireless system when he throws his guitar around. He uses Ernie Ball Regular Slinky nickel-wound guitar strings.

== Discography ==
Iron Maiden

Main article: Iron Maiden discography
- No Prayer for the Dying (1990)
- Fear of the Dark (1992)
- The X Factor (1995)
- Virtual XI (1998)
- Brave New World (2000)
- Dance of Death (2003)
- A Matter of Life and Death (2006)
- The Final Frontier (2010)
- The Book of Souls (2015)
- Senjutsu (2021)

White Spirit

- White Spirit (1980)

Gillan

- Double Trouble (1981)
- Magic (1982)

Gogmagog

- I Will Be There (EP) (1985)

Fish

- Vigil in a Wilderness of Mirrors (1990)

Bruce Dickinson

- Tattooed Millionaire (1990)

Ian Gillan

- Gillan's Inn (2006)

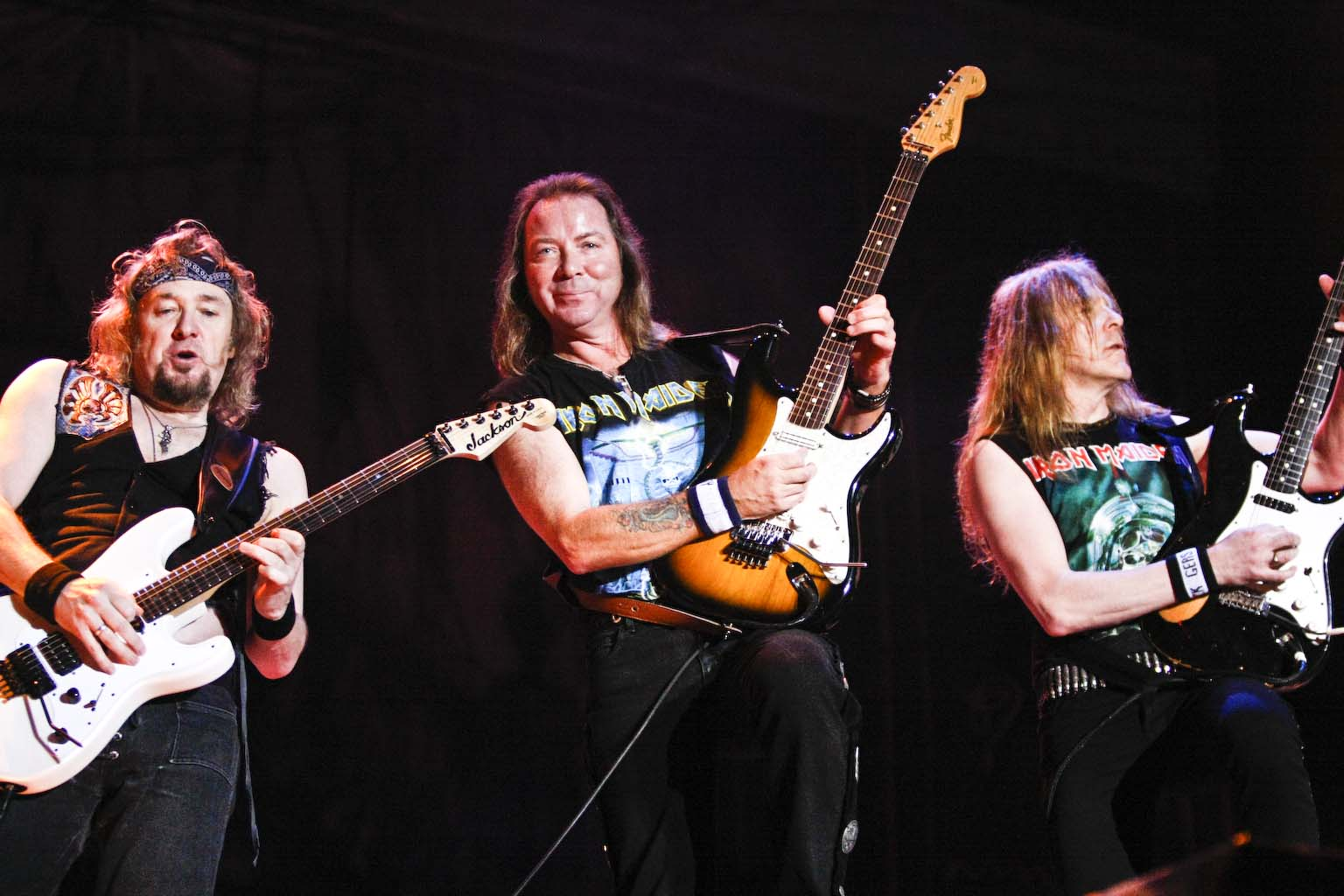
Gers (right) performing with Dave Murray (center) and Adrian Smith (left) in Costa Rica.
