= Dave Murray (musician) =

English guitarist (born 1956)

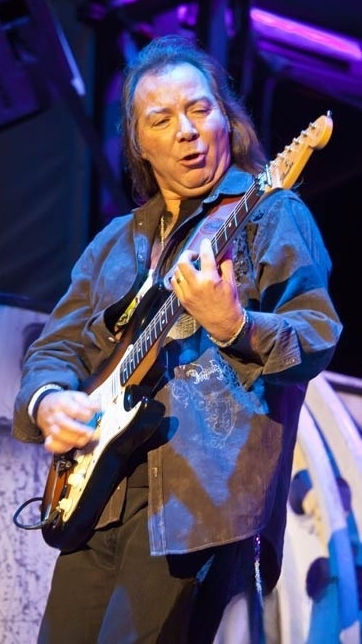
- Murray performing in Melbourne, Australia on 4 March 2011

Background information
- Born: David Michael Murray; 23 December 1956 (age 69); Edmonton, Middlesex, England
- Genres: Heavy metal; hard rock
- Occupation: Guitarist
- Years active: 1975–present
- Member of: Iron Maiden
- Formerly of: Urchin; Hear 'n Aid

David Michael Murray (born 23 December 1956) is an English guitarist, best known as a member of the heavy metal band Iron Maiden. He joined Iron Maiden early in its history, and is the second-longest serving member of the band after founder Steve Harris. He and Harris are the only members of Iron Maiden to have appeared on all of the band's studio albums.

Growing up in London, Murray became interested in rock music at 15 and formed his first band Stone Free with neighborhood friend Adrian Smith. He regularly answered advertisements seeking guitar players in Melody Maker, before first auditioning for Iron Maiden in 1976. After a brief hiatus, Murray rejoined Iron Maiden in 1978 and remains with the band to the present day.

== Biography ==
As a child, Murray and his family lived in poverty and were constantly moving to different areas of London, which meant that he was often bullied and involved in fights. By the time his family settled in Clapton in 1970, Murray joined an early metalhead gang that brawled with skinheads and "had a rowdy couple of hairy hellraising years of being out on the street." He developed an interest in rock music when he was 15 after hearing "Voodoo Child" by Jimi Hendrix on the radio, about which he recalls, "everything changed, just like that. Getting into rock music wasn't like a gradual process for me; it was completely sort of extreme, totally black and white. I heard 'Voodoo Child' on the radio and I thought, 'Bloody hell! What is THAT? How do you do THAT?' And I started hanging around the rock music section of the record stores and buying albums, thinking about getting into the big time, wondering what that would be like."

After "hanging 'round record stores" and building his record collection, Murray decided to take up the guitar. At 16, he formed his first band, a trio called Stone Free, which also included his friend Adrian Smith on vocals. Murray would answer ads in Melody Maker and regularly audition for different bands, leading to short stints in Electric Gas, "this sort of soft-rock, American-type band", and The Secret, "this sort of mad punk band". With The Secret, he recorded under the name "Reggie Mental" and appeared on the single "The Young Ones" and the demo Café De Dance in 1977.

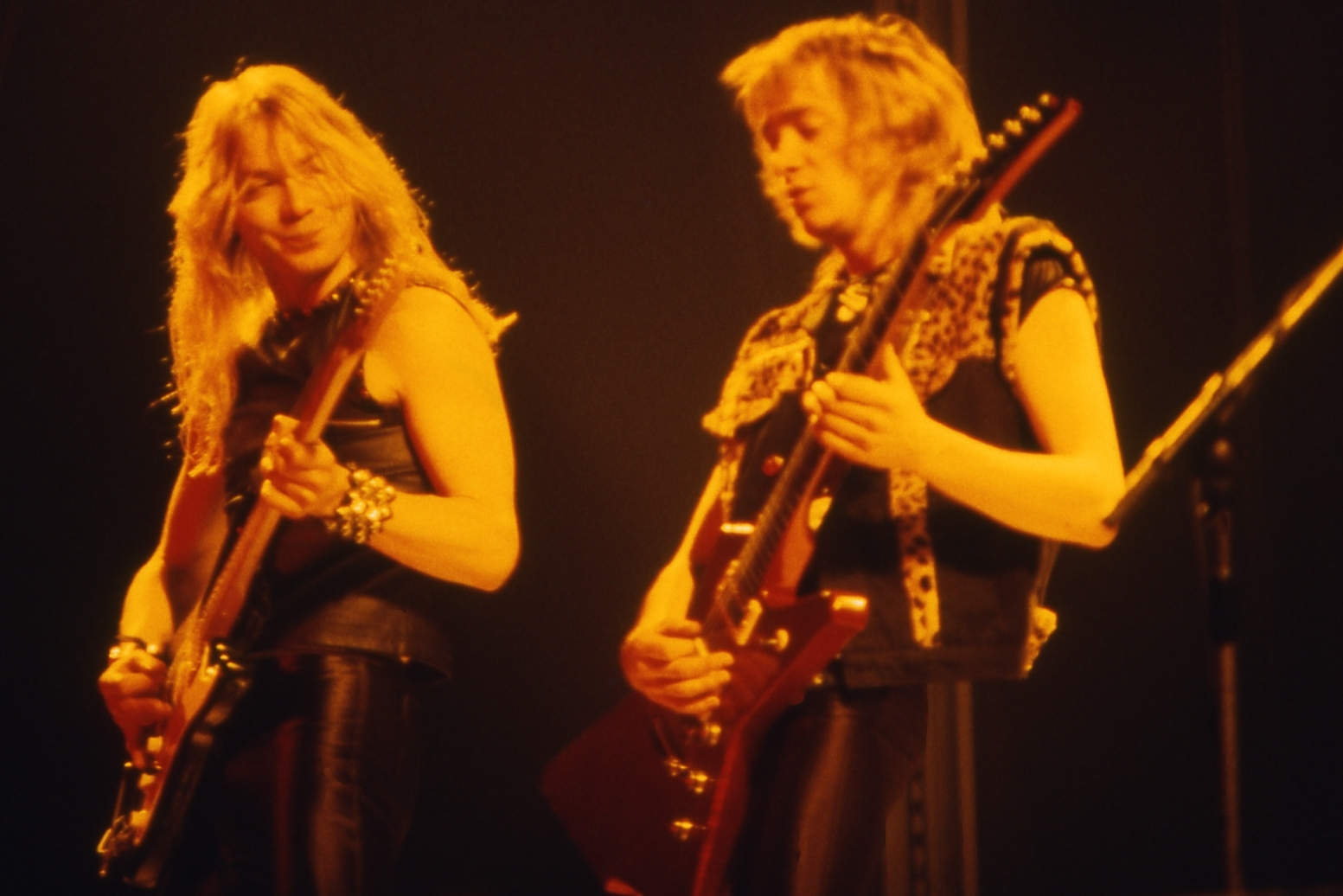
Murray (left) performing with Adrian Smith in 1982

He auditioned for Iron Maiden in late 1976, eager to get back into "a more sort of heavy rock-type vibe." At the time the band already had two guitarists, Dave Sullivan and Terry Rance, who disapproved of Murray being permitted to audition, seeing it as a slight on their ability. The group's founder and bassist Steve Harris did not hesitate to choose Murray over Sullivan and Rance, later stating: "When the others made it plain that it was either them or Dave Murray, there was no choice. There was no way I was gonna let Dave go. Not only was he a nice bloke, he was just the best guitarist I'd ever worked with. He still is." After only a few months in the band, Murray was sacked following an argument with singer Dennis Wilcock.

Murray then reunited with Adrian Smith in Smith's band Urchin. During his short tenure with the band, Murray recorded one single, entitled "She's a Roller", after which he was asked to rejoin Iron Maiden shortly before Wilcock's departure. Murray worked as a caretaker and storekeeper at the Hackney Town Hall, which he has stated was "so I could sleep off the night before", but was able to resign once Iron Maiden signed with EMI in 1979. Murray remains with Iron Maiden to the present day, and he and Harris are the only members who have appeared on all the band's commercial releases. One of his few musical projects outside of the band was in a jazz ensemble with bandmate Nicko McBrain in the latter's instructional drumming video Rhythms of the Beast.

In 2026 Murray was inducted into the Rock and Roll Hall of Fame as a member of Iron Maiden.

== Artistry and influence ==
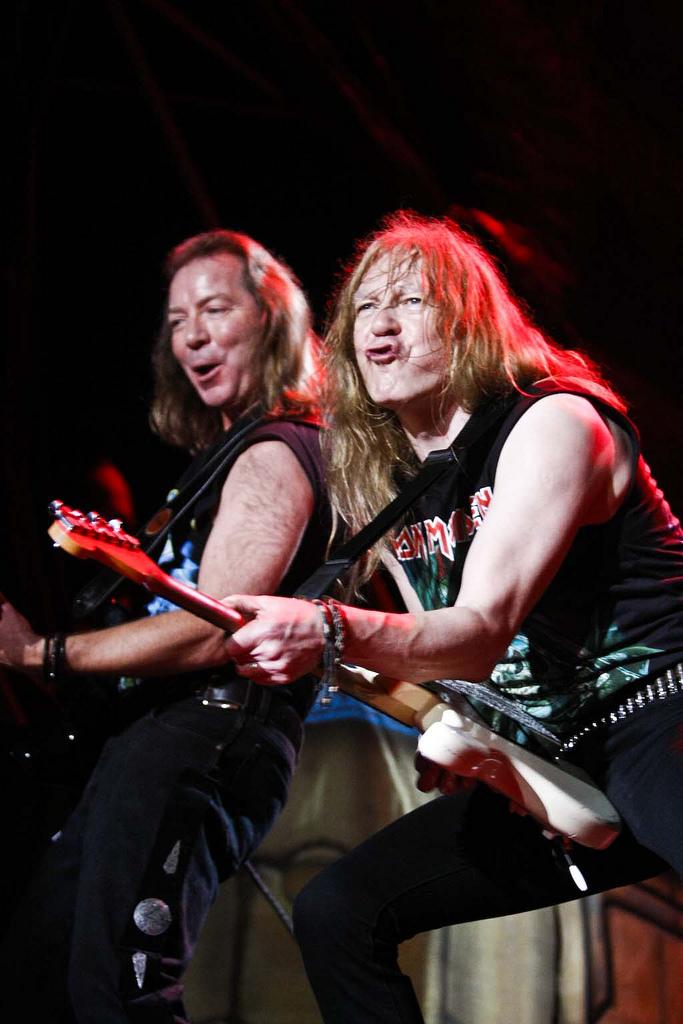
Murray (to the left) performing with Janick Gers in 2008

Murray's solo guitar style throughout his career has been mainly based on the legato technique, such as on "The Trooper", which he claims "evolved naturally. I'd heard Jimi Hendrix using legato when I was growing up, and I liked that style of playing." His playing has a distinctly fluid sound which distinguishes him from the other two guitarists in Iron Maiden. He has also written songs for Iron Maiden, though he is less prolific than other band members, usually forgoing lyric writing and instead concentrating on the musical elements of songwriting. He mainly co-writes songs with another member of Iron Maiden, and "Charlotte the Harlot" (from 1980's Iron Maiden) is to date the only composition for which he is credited as sole writer. In a 2015 interview with Premier Guitar Murray commented on his style stating that "personally, I like to try to be melodic but with a little fire and energy."

Publications have made note of his harmonized guitar riffs and solos with bandmate Adrian Smith, which have become staples of Iron Maiden's sound, and of heavy metal music in general. Murray said, "There was this chemistry between me and Adrian that went beyond the music." The guitar interplay between the two has been compared to guitarists Glenn Tipton and K.K. Downing of Judas Priest. According to Jeff Kitts of Guitar World, "the duo of Murray and Smith was considered the top British metal guitar tandem of the Eighties. First pairing off for 1981’s blistering Killers, Murray and Smith quickly proved that they could play harmony leads and interlocking riffs as if linked by one brain, and do it with a speed and aggression that put most punk bands of the era to shame." AllMusic Gers "became recognized for his high-speed dexterity of his solos, fluid legato technique, and telepathic rhythm work in tandem with old friend Smith".

According to Quentin Thane Singer of Forbes, "Dave Murray’s and Adrian Smith’s dueling guitar harmonies, galloping riffs and epic guitar solos have influenced nearly every significant band to come out of the metal genre since the mid ‘80s. As the primary guitarists for Iron Maiden, Murray and Smith helped to popularize anthemic lead guitar playing, which has consequently become a staple in metal music for the last 40-plus years."

In conjunction with bandmates Smith and (later) Janick Gers, Murray appears at # 9 on Gibson's list of the Top 10 Metal Guitarists of All Time, # 11 on Guitar World's list of the 100 Greatest Metal Guitarists of All Time, #4 on Metal Hammer's list of the greatest metal guitarists of all time. and #83 on Rolling Stone's list of the 250 Greatest Guitarists of All Time. Murray is also ranked,#52 on Loudwire's list of the 75 Best Hard Rock/Metal Guitarists of All Time.

== Personal life ==
Murray and his wife Tamar have one daughter. Murray resides on the island of Maui, Hawaii in the US.

In his spare time, Murray (along with bandmate Nicko McBrain) is an avid golfer, as seen in the Rock in Rio DVD and Iron Maiden: Flight 666; he revealed in 2002 that he tries to play "a couple of rounds in each week" and his handicap "can be anywhere from 15 to 24." During his early years in Iron Maiden he would also regularly go fishing with fellow bandmates Adrian Smith and Clive Burr.

== Equipment ==
Murray used and endorsed Marshall amplifiers almost exclusively, other than on the Somewhere in Time (1986) and Seventh Son of a Seventh Son (1988) albums and their respective tours, when he instead used Gallien-Krueger amps, and Victory Amps during the recordings of The Book of Souls, but again Marshalls on tour (his rack system featuring JMP1 pre-amp fed into the FX loop of Marshall DSL heads, using the DSL heads as power amps). As of 2023, during Maiden's Future Past World Tour, it was revealed Murray had begun using the Fractal Axe-FX III amp modeler, replacing the long-serving Marshall JMP-1 preamps.

=== Guitars ===
He has used Fender Stratocaster guitars almost exclusively. His black 1957/63 (the body is from a '63; the neck from a '57) Stratocaster, previously owned by late Free guitarist Paul Kossoff, was used approximately between 1978 and 1988. It was used as a template by Fender to manufacture an Artist Signature model in 2009. The original is now stored safely in a bank vault in London. "I bought it in 1976," he said. "I saw it advertised in Melody Maker… I got the serial number to check it was [Kossoff's] guitar. It cost quite a bit of money but I didn't care. I just sold everything I had so I could get it, and I used it from then on. It just felt like I was holding a piece of magic because he had used this guitar."

In addition to Fender guitars, Murray has occasionally performed with various Dean, Gibson, Ibanez, ESP and Jackson electric models. During the Dance of Death World Tour 2003–4, Murray used a Gibson Hummingbird acoustic guitar for live performances of the song "Journeyman".

From 2003, his main guitar was a 2-tone sunburst Fender Californian Series Stratocaster with 3 Seymour Duncan Hot Rails pick-ups, however he changed the middle position pick-up to a Seymour Duncan JB Jr. pick-up during the Maiden England tour in 2012-13. It also features a chrome Floyd Rose tremolo system. In 2015, Seymour Duncan announced the release of the official Dave Murray Loaded Pickguard set with demonstrator Danny Young performing the official video on the Seymour Duncan YouTube channel. On stage, Murray has also performed with a cream USA Floyd Rose Standard Stratocaster (with a 22-fret maple neck and same electronics and hardware as the sunburst model), a custom Stratocaster based on his aforementioned Paul Kossoff Fender, and a Gibson Flying V.

In 2010, he began using a Gibson Les Paul Traditional model, featuring Seymour Duncan '59 and JB pickups in the neck and bridge positions respectively, which his guitar technician, Colin Price, states was originally brought in for Adrian Smith to try, but was then bought by Murray for practising on tour. In addition to this Les Paul, he primarily used a 2002 Les Paul Classic with a Seymour Duncan '59 and JB neck and bridge pickups for the recording of The Book of Souls (2015), as well as a sunburst Gibson Les Paul Axccess with the same pickup configuration and a Floyd Rose tremolo.

In 2015, Fender announced a second Artist Signature model, based on his California Series Stratocaster. It retains all the specifications of his original guitar, has a compound radius fretboard and is made entirely in their Ensenada plant in Mexico.

As of 2023, Murray uses as his main guitar a brand new Fender Custom Shop Stratocaster, built by Fender Master Builder Andy Hicks which features an Olympic White finish, walnut neck, rosewood fretboard, Stainless Steel frets and with the same hardware - Floyd Rose tremolo, Dave Murray Seymour Duncan Loaded Pickguard with Hot Rails in the bridge and neck positions and a JB Jr. in the middle. For the 2024 leg of the Future past tour, the guitar has been upgraded with FU Tone parts, (Floyd Rose saddles, locking nut pads, noiseless springs). His California Series strat which is now his main back-up has also had the same upgrades as well as having had a re-fret with stainless steel frets.

=== Guitar specifications ===
- Ernie Ball Strings – custom gauge .009, .011, .014, .024, .032, .042
- Seymour Duncan Hot Rails single coil sized humbucking pick-ups with dual blade coils
- "Original" Floyd Rose Locking Tremolo Systems
- His Artist Signature model features a soft V-shaped maple neck with satin back and sports a humbucker/single-coil/humbucker (HSH) configuration – DiMarzio Super Distortion DP100 (bridge), American Vintage '57/'62 (middle), DiMarzio PAF DP-103 (neck) – with 3-way switching and American Vintage hardware. The Japanese-made "Tribute" version of the guitar (HST-57DM) features an "Original" Floyd Rose double-locking tremolo system, dual DiMarzio Super Distortion DP100 humbucking pick-ups (bridge/neck), a Fender Texas Special single-coil pick-up in the middle position, a 5-way pick-up selector and an oval neck profile
- The original black '57 Stratocaster has similar features to his Artist Series Model

=== Amplifiers ===
- 2 x Marshall 1960B Straight Cabinet / 4x12 300-Watt Loaded with Celestion 12" G12T 75 Watt Speakers
- 3 x Marshall JCM 2000 DSL tube heads (rack gear plugs into power amp section via FX loop)
- Marshall 9200 Rack Power Amp (as backup for main heads)
- Victory V100 head with Victory V412 Cabinet (as of 2014)
- Fender Super-Sonic 100-watt 2x12 combo

=== Units and tuners ===
- Korg DTR-1 Digital Tuner
- Dunlop DCR-1SR Rack Cry Baby Wah
- Dunlop JD-4S Rotovibe
- Custom-Built Pete Cornish Routing and Power Supply Units
- Marshall JMP-1 Valve Midi Preamp
- Mike Hill Custom Uni-Vibe/Tube Screamer Rack Effect Unit
- Rocktron All-Access Foot Controller
- TC Electronic GForce Effect Unit
- Fulltone Deja'Vibe
- Fulltone Clyde Standard Wah Pedal
- MXR Uni-Vibe Chorus
- MXR Distortion +
- TC Electronic Flashback Delay
- TC Electronic Corona Chorus
- Voodoo Amplification Platinum Mod to Marshall JMP-1 Preamp
- Wampler Clarksdale Delta Overdrive
- Phil Hilborne Fat Treble Booster
- Fractal Axe-FX III Turbo

== Discography ==
Iron Maiden

Main article: Iron Maiden discography
- Iron Maiden (1980)
- Killers (1981)
- The Number of the Beast (1982)
- Piece of Mind (1983)
- Powerslave (1984)
- Somewhere in Time (1986)
- Seventh Son of a Seventh Son (1988)
- No Prayer for the Dying (1990)
- Fear of the Dark (1992)
- The X Factor (1995)
- Virtual XI (1998)
- Brave New World (2000)
- Dance of Death (2003)
- A Matter of Life and Death (2006)
- The Final Frontier (2010)
- The Book of Souls (2015)
- Senjutsu (2021)

Guest appearances

- Hear 'n Aid – "Stars" (1985)
- Nicko McBrain – Rhythms of the Beast (video, 1991)
- Psycho Motel – "With You Again", Welcome to the World (1997)

== Awards and nominations ==
As a member of Iron Maiden Murray has received numerous nominations, honours and awards including Grammy Awards and equivalents awards in many countries, Brit Awards, Ivor Novello Awards, Rockbjörnen Awards , and Juno Awards. In 2016 Murray and Iron Maiden were given the titles of Honorary Visitors of the Country Award in El Salvador. In 2019 Murray and the rest of Iron Maiden all individually received the Relief Salon De Los Pasos Perdidos – State prize for their contribution to the development of Argentina’s culture and music. It was the first time it was awarded to artists outside of Argentina.

Year	Award	Category	Result
1991	Metal Hammer Golden Gods Awards	Best Guitarst	Nominated
2005	Hollywood's RockWalk	As a member of Iron Maiden	Inducted
2007	Metal Hammer Golden Gods Awards	Riff Lord (shared with Janick Gers, Adrian Smith)	Nominated
2011	Revolver Golden Gods Awards	Riff Lord (shared with Janick Gers, Adrian Smith)	Nominated
2026	Rock and Roll Hall of Fame	Hall of Fame	Inducted

== Literature ==
- "Juno Winners – 2010 Gala Dinner & Awards". Juno Awards. 18 April 2010. Archived from the original on 26 April 2012.
- "Iron Maiden honoured with Ivor Novello award". Sanctuary Group. 18 September 2002. Archived from the original (Official Website) on 10 March 2007.
- Wall, Mick (2004). Iron Maiden: Run to the Hills, the Authorised Biography (third ed.). Sanctuary Publishing. ISBN 1-86074-542-3.
