= List of Blaze Bayley band members =

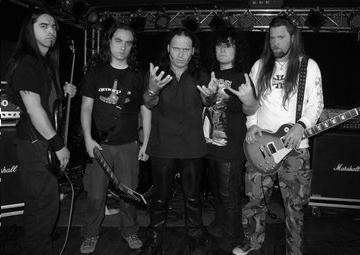
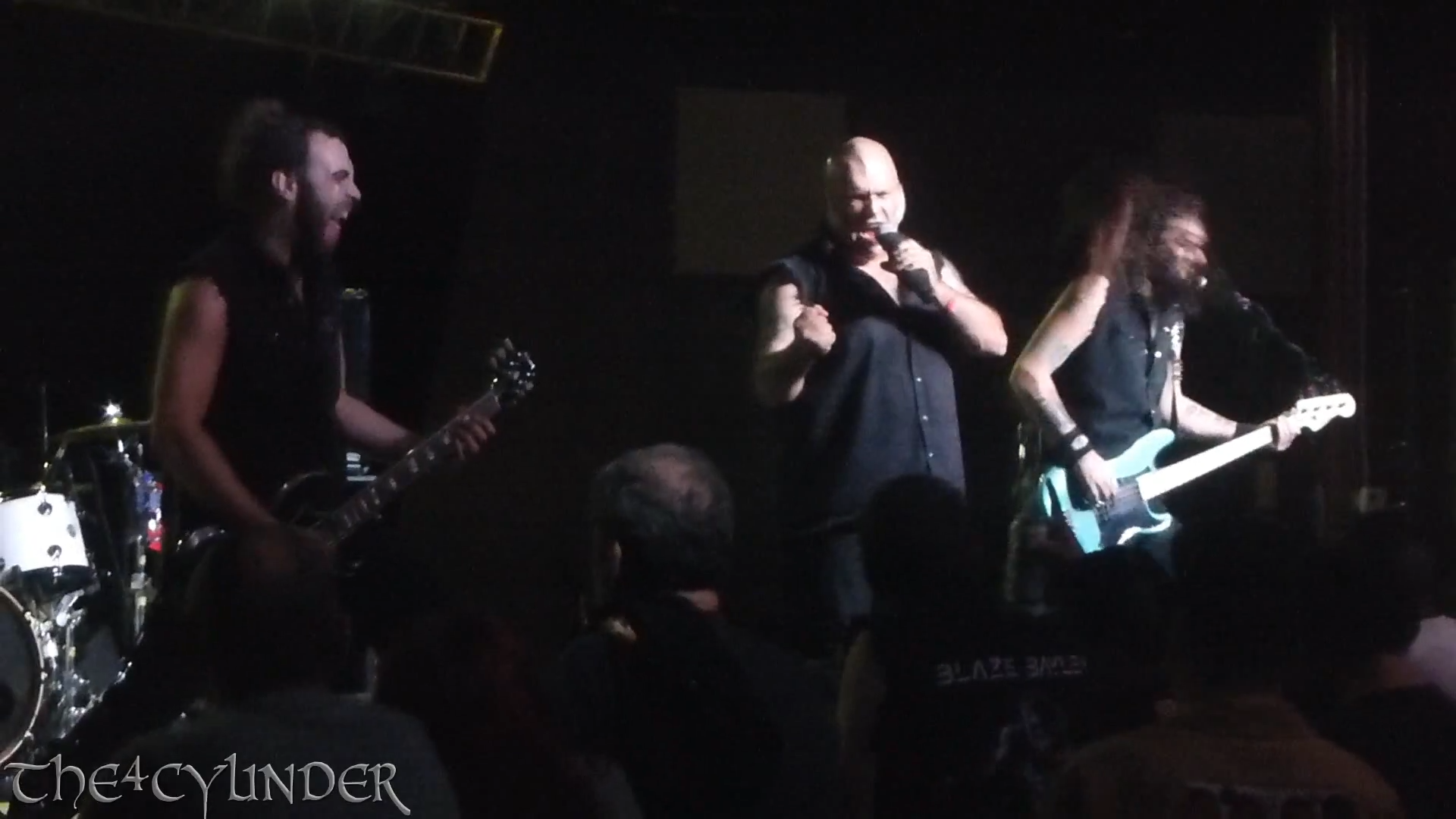
Two line-ups of Blaze in 2007 and 2017

Blaze Bayley is an English heavy metal singer, who started his career as singer of Wolfsbane in 1984, before joining Iron Maiden in 1994. Following his departure from Iron Maiden in 1999, he began a solo career with his eponymous band BLAZE, which featured guitarists Steve Wray and John Slater, bassist Rob Naylor and drummer Jeff Singer. His current main touring band is the melodic death metal band Absolva, which features Chris Appleton (Guitar), Tom Atkinson (Guitar), Luke Appleton (Bass), and Martin McNee (Drums).

== History ==
In September 2004, Bayley parted ways with his band, who by that point had been joined by Dave Knight (drums) and Wayne Banks (bass), replacing Naylor and Singer respectively, the drummer position was filled by Jason Bowld (Pitchshifter) by late 2003. His new band included bassist Nick Douglas (Doro), guitarists Oliver Palotai (Uli Jon Roth) and Luca Princiotta, and drummer Daniel Loble. By 2005, Douglas and Loble had been replaced by Christian Ammann and Daniel Schild respectively.

By January 2007, Bayley had parted ways with this backing band. In March that same year, Bayley announced his new band, now under the name Blaze Bayley, featuring Rico Banderra on drums, Nick Bermudez on guitar, David Bermudez on bass and Rich Newport on guitar. By 2008, Newport and Banderra had been replaced by Jay Walsh and Lawrence Paterson respectively. In 2010 Paterson was replaced by Claudio Tirincanti.

In March 2011, Bayley split with all members except Tirincanti. His new backing band featured guitarists Steve Deleu and Dave Andrews, and bassist Nick Meganck. By 2012 his backing band featured Tirincanti, as well as bassist Matteo "Lehmann" Grazzini and guitarist Andrea Neri. Also in 2012, he performed acoustic shows with classical guitarist Thomas Zwijsen.

In 2014, Bayley started touring with the band Absolva as his backing band, at this point they consisted of guitarists Chris and Luke Appleton, drummer Martin Mcnee and bassist Dan Bate. By September, Bate had left and was replaced by Karl Schramm. The band were also reduced to a trio when Luke stopped performing with the band due to his commitment to Iced Earth. Although he returned as a guest for shows between 2018 and 2019, before returning full time in 2021 after Iced Earth's hiatus.

In April 2025, Schramm departed both bands, and Luke took up bass, his original instrument. In September 2025, former Absolva guitarist Tom Atkinson returned to Absolva and started performing with Blaze Bayley as well.

== Main band ==
=== Current ===
Image	Name	Years active	Instruments	Release contributions
	Blaze Bayley	1999–present	vocals	all releases
	Chris Appleton	2009–2010; 2013–present	lead and rhythm guitars; backing vocals	all releases from Live in Prague (DVD release only) (2014) onwards
	Luke Appleton	2009–2010; 2013–2014; 2018–2019; 2021–present	rhythm and lead guitars (2013–2025); bass (2009–2010, 2025–present); backing vocals	all releases from Circle of Stone (2024) onwards
	Martin McNee	2013–present	drums	all releases from Live in Prague (DVD release only) (2014) onwards
	Tom Atkinson	2025–present	rhythm and lead guitars	no releases

=== Former ===
Image	Name	Years active	Instruments	Release contributions
	John Slater	1999–2004	guitars	Silicon Messiah (2000); Tenth Dimension (2002); As Live as It Gets (2003); Blood & Belief (2004)
	Steve Wray	1999–2004	guitars	Silicon Messiah (2000); Tenth Dimension (2002); As Live as It Gets (2003); Blood & Belief (2004)
	Rob Naylor	1999–2003	bass	Silicon Messiah (2000); Tenth Dimension (2002); As Live as It Gets (2003)
	Jeff Singer	1999–2003	drums	Silicon Messiah (2000); Tenth Dimension (2002); As Live as It Gets (2003)
	Phil Greenhouse	2003	drums	none
	Wayne Banks	2003–2004	bass	Blood & Belief (2004)
	Jason Bowld	2004	drums	Blood & Belief (2004)
	Oliver Palotai	2004–2007	guitars	none
	Luca Princiotta	2004–2007	guitars	none
	Daniel Löble	2004–2005	drums	none
	Nick Douglas	2004–2005	bass	none
	Christian Ammann	2005–2007	bass	none
	Daniel Schild	2005–2007	drums	none
	David Bermudez	2007–2011	bass	Alive in Poland (2007); The Man Who Would Not Die (2008); The Night That Would Not Die (2009); Promise and Terror (2010)
	Nicolas Bermudez	2007–2011	guitars	Alive in Poland (2007); The Man Who Would Not Die (2008); The Night That Would Not Die (2009); Promise and Terror (2010)
	Rich Newport	2007	guitars	Alive in Poland (2007)
	Rico Banderra	2007	drums	Alive in Poland (2007)
	Jay Walsh	2007–2011	guitars	The Man Who Would Not Die (2008); The Night That Would Not Die (2009); Promise and Terror (2010)
	Lawrence Paterson	2007–2010, live 2025-2026	drums	The Man Who Would Not Die (2008); The Night That Would Not Die (2009); Promise and Terror (2010)
	Claudio Tirincanti	2010–2012	drums	The King of Metal (2012); Live in Prague (DVD release only) (2014)
	Dave Andrews	2011	guitars	none
	Steve Deleu	2011	guitars	none
	Nick Meganck	2011	bass	Live in Prague (DVD release only) (2014)
	Thomas Zwijsen	2012	guitars	The King of Metal (2012); Infinite Entanglement (2016); Endure and Survive – Infinite Entanglement Part II (2017)
	Andrea Neri	2012	guitars	The King of Metal (2012)
	Matteo Lehmann	2012	bass	The King of Metal (2012)
	Dan Bate	2013–2014	bass; backing vocals	Live in Prague (DVD release only) (2014)
	Karl Schramm	2014–2025	bass; backing vocals	all releases from Infinite Entanglement (2016) to Circle of Stone (2024)

== Former line-ups ==
B L A Z E (March 1999 – January 2003)	Blaze Bayley – vocals; John Slater – guitars; Steve Wray – guitars; Rob Naylor – bass; Jeff Singer – drums
B L A Z E (January – April 2003)	Blaze Bayley – vocals; John Slater – guitars; Steve Wray – guitars; Rob Naylor – bass; Phil Greenhouse – drums
B L A Z E (April 2003 – December 2003)	Blaze Bayley – vocals; John Slater – guitars; Steve Wray – guitars; Wayne Banks – bass; Phil Greenhouse – drums
B L A Z E (January 2004 – September 2004)	Blaze Bayley – vocals; John Slater – guitars; Steve Wray – guitars; Wayne Banks – bass; Jason Bowld – drums
B L A Z E (October 2004 – December 2005)	Blaze Bayley – vocals; Oliver Palotai – guitars; Luca Princiotta – guitars; Nick Douglas – bass; Daniel Löble – drums
B L A Z E (December 2005 – January 2007)	Blaze Bayley – vocals; Oliver Palotai – guitars; Luca Princiotta – guitars; Christian Ammann – bass; Daniel Schild – drums
Blaze Bayley band (March 2007 – October 2007)	Blaze Bayley – vocals; Rich Newport – guitars; Nicolas Bermudez – guitars; David Bermudez – bass; Rico Banderra – drums
Blaze Bayley Band (November 2007 – April 2010)	Blaze Bayley – vocals; Jay Walsh – guitars; Nicolas Bermudez – guitars; David Bermudez – bass; Lawrence Paterson – drums
Blaze Bayley Band (April 2010 – March 2011)	Blaze Bayley – vocals; Jay Walsh – guitars; Nicolas Bermudez – guitars; David Bermudez – bass; Claudio Tirincanti – drums
Blaze Bayley (March 2011 – December 2011)	Blaze Bayley – vocals; Dave Andrews – guitars; Steve Deleu – guitars; Nick Meganck – bass; Claudio Tirincanti – drums
Blaze Bayley (January 2012 – December 2012)	Blaze Bayley – vocals; Thomas Zwijsen – guitars; Andrea Neri – guitars; Lehmann – bass; Claudio Tirincanti – drums
Blaze Bayley (December 2013 – November 2014)	Blaze Bayley – vocals; Chris Appleton – guitars; Luke Appleton – guitars; Dan Bate – bass; Martin McNee – drums
Blaze Bayley (December 2014 – March 2025)	Blaze Bayley – vocals; Chris Appleton – guitars; Luke Appleton – guitars; Karl Schramm – bass; Martin McNee – drums
Blaze Bayley (April 2025 – September 2025)	Blaze Bayley – vocals; Chris Appleton – guitars; Luke Appleton – bass; Martin McNee – drums
Blaze Bayley (September 2025 – present)	Blaze Bayley – vocals; Chris Appleton – guitars; Luke Appleton – bass; Martin McNee – drums; Tom Atkinson – guitars

== Other projects ==
=== "Trinity" with Geoff Tate and "Ripper" Owens ===
From 2016, Blaze joined former Queensryche singer Geoff Tate and former Judas Priest vocalist Tim Owens in the touring project "Trinity"

- Blaze Bayley – vocals
- Kelly Gray - Guitars
- Scott Moughton - Guitars
- Tim Fernley - Bass
- Scott Mercado - Drums

=== "Metal Singers" with Udo, "Ripper" Owens and Mike Vescera ===
In 2015 the four singer toured South America together

- Blaze Bayley – vocals
- Lely Biscasse - Guitars
- Raphael Gazal - Guitars
- Lennon Biscasse - Bass
- Guto Franceschet - Drums

=== Bayley vs Di'Anno ===
From 2012, former Iron Maiden singers Blaze Bayley and Paul Di'Anno started a partnership doing some co-headlining tours and sharing the same roster of musicians.

- Russian Federation and occasionally Scandinavia:

- Blaze Bayley – vocals
- Andrey Smirnov
- Vladimir Litsov – guitars
- Ilya Mamontov – guitars
- Nikolay Korshunov – bass
- Andrey Ischenko – drums
- Sergey Serbrennikov – drums

- For their Australia/New Zealand tour Bayley and Di'Anno shared Australian musicians:

- Blaze Bayley – vocals
- Doug Dalton – guitars
- Jimmy Lardner-Brown – guitars
- Stu Tyrrell – bass
- Dom Simpson – drums

- For the Scandinavian gigs and occasionally Great Britain:

- Blaze Bayley – vocals
- Richie Nielsen – guitars
- John V – guitars
- Are Gogstad – bass
- Rick Hagan – drums

- For some Italian and French gigs the two singers have been backed by official Iron Maiden tribute band Children of the Damned from Italy:

- Blaze Bayley – vocals
- Carlo Micheletti – guitars
- Andrea Moretti – guitars
- Francesco Bevini – guitars
- Matteo Panzavolta – bass
- Gianluca Calanca – drums

=== Metal vs Blues ===
In 2015 Blaze started a cooperation with US-Italian band Twin Dragons with the shows "Metal vs Blues Rock", with these musicians:

- Blaze Bayley - vocals
- Nazzareno Zacconi - guitars
- Don Roxx - guitars
- Fabio Cerrone - bass
- Manuel Togni - drums

== North America ==
- Starting from 2013 Bayley hit the stage for brief US tours with an all star project named The Foundry, involving members of Disturbed, Adrenaline Mob, Danzig, Black Simphony, Scorpions, Fates Warning and Twisted Sisters:

- Blaze Bayley – vocals
- Rick Plester – guitars
- John Moyer – bass
- Bobby Jarzombek - drums
- (James Kottak – drums 2013)
- (A.J. Pero – drums 2014-2015)
- (Shawn Austin – guest on vocals 2013)

- In Mexico 2016 he has been backed by metal band Overfire:

- Blaze Bayley – vocals
- Paco Lorenzana - guitars
- Adrián Toussaint - guitars
- Eduardo Mandujano - bass
- Miky Estrada - drums

- In Canadian Tour of September 2016 his musicians were from bands Insurgent Inc and Maiden Québec.

- Blaze Bayley - vocals
- Luis-Alberto Sanchez - guitars
- Leandro Alves - guitars
- Math Gagnon - bass
- Olivier Forest - drums

- In Canadian tour of October 2014 he was backed by Maiden Québec:

- Blaze Bayley – vocals
- Steven Bergeron – guitars
- Leandro Alves – guitars
- Math Gagnon – bass
- Jef Rastoldo – drums

- In the US tour of 2011 the singer performed with the following band:

- Blaze Bayley – vocals
- Rick Plester – guitars
- M.G. Jones – guitars
- Matt Maclean – bass
- Bill Legue – drums
- (Chris Declercq – guest on guitars)

== South America ==
- In most of South American tours Blaze (initially with Zwijsen) has been backed by musicians of "The Best Maiden Tribute" and Tailgunners from Brazil:

- Blaze Bayley – vocals
- Thomas Zwijsen – guitars
- Lely Biscasse – guitars
- Raphael Gazal – guitars
- Lennon Biscasse – bass
- Guto Franceschet – drums

- In Argentina 2016 he used two different bands:

- Blaze Bayley - vocals
- Diego Lombardo - guitars
- Emiliano Bracamonte - guitars
- Salvador Sauan - bass
- Eric Flägel - drums
- Blaze Bayley - vocals
- German Catelli - guitars
- Damian Nahuel Ros - guitars
- Julian Chuña Acuña Chapczuk - bass
- Cristian Cuppari - drums

- In Colombia 2016 with the band ADS:

- Blaze Bayley - vocals
- Adrian Dark Storm - guitars
- Jose Alfredo García - guitars
- Daniel Mantilla - bass
- Alejandro Rueda - drums

- In Chle 2016 has been backed by the band Genghis Khan:

- Blaze Bayley- vocals
- Diego Garcia - guitars
- Ivàn Moya - guitars
- Felipe Duràn - bass
- Carlos Osorio - drums

== Unplugged ==
- For acoustic touring Blaze recently involved those musicians:

- Thomas Zwijsen – guitars
- Anne Bakker – violin
- Michelle Sciarrotta – guitars
- Olivier Arpin and Stephan Laroche – guitars
- Andrea Neri – guitars
- Jase Edwards – guitars
- Nazzareno Zacconi - guitars

== Occasional ==
- In September 2014, celebrating 20 years after joining Iron Maiden, he toured with a special set with this band from Slovakia:

- Blaze Bayley – vocals
- Juro Gasinec – guitars
- Tibor Buso – guitars
- Jan Kicin – bass
- Lubo Franek – drums

- For the Italian summer tour of 2011, soon after the dissolution of Blaze Bayley Band, the singer has occasionally performed with the following lineup:

- Blaze Bayley – vocals
- Andrea Neri – guitars
- Lorenzo Carancini – guitars
- Simone Massimi – bass
- Roberto Pirami – drums

- In March 2013 the line-up was:

- Blaze Bayley – vocals
- James Cornford – guitars
- Peter Welsh – guitars More (band)
- Jim Houghton – bass
- Ray Whisker – drums

- In one festival in France of 2012 Neil, bandmate of Lehmann in Neurasthenia, has performed on guitars as stand-in for Andrea Neri

- In 2025 and 2026 former drummer Larry Paterson and Rich Newsome deputed for Martin Mcnee

- Bayley occasionally performed full shows with the bands Seven (Czech Republic), Trooper (Romania), John Steel (Bulgaria), Hammerheart (Slovakia), Apsent (Turkey, first gig ever after the dissolution of Blaze Bayley Band), Lunar Explosion and Flash of The Blade (Italy)
