= Blaze Bayley discography =

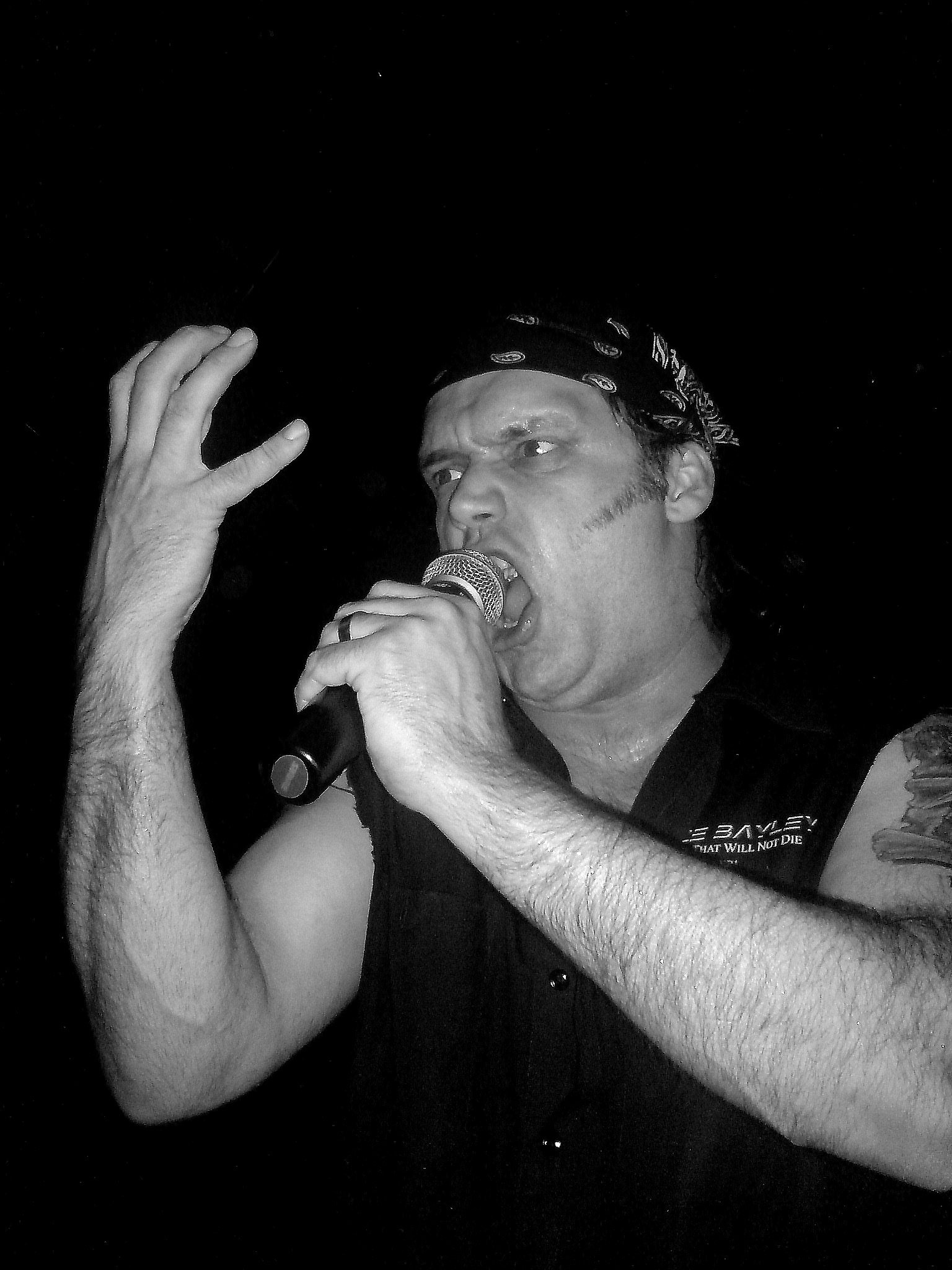
Bayley performing in 2009

This is the discography for English heavy metal singer Blaze Bayley.

== Wolfsbane ==
Studio albums

- Live Fast, Die Fast (1989)
- All Hell's Breaking Loose Down at Little Kathy Wilson's Place (Mini, 1990)
- Down Fall The Good Guys (1991, remastered 2012)
- Wolfsbane (1994)
- Howling Mad Shithead – The Best of Wolfsbane (2010)
- Did it for the Money (EP, 2011)
- Wolfsbane Save the World (2012)
- Genius (2022)

EPs

- The Lost Tapes: A Secret History (2012)
- Rock! (EP, 2015)

Compilation album

- Lifestyles of the Broke and Obscure (2001)

Live album

- Massive Noise Injection (1993)

== Iron Maiden ==
Studio albums

- The X Factor (1995)
- Virtual XI (1998)

Compilation albums

- Best of the Beast (1996)
- Best of the 'B' Sides (2002)
- Eddie's Archive (2002)
- Edward the Great (2002, 2005)
- Visions of the Beast (2003)

Video games

- Ed Hunter (1999)

== Blaze ==
Studio albums

- Silicon Messiah (2000)
- Tenth Dimension (2002)
- Blood & Belief (2004)

Live albums

- As Live as It Gets (2003)

== Blaze Bayley ==
Studio albums

- The Man Who Would Not Die (2008) Released on Ltd Ed vinyl December 2010
- Promise and Terror (2010)
- The King of Metal (2012)
- Infinite Entanglement (2016)
- Endure and Survive - Infinite Entanglement Part II (2017)
- The Redemption of William Black - Infinite Entanglement Part III (2018)
- War Within Me (2021)
- Circle of Stone (2024)

Live albums

- The Night That Will Not Die (2009)
- Live in Prague (2014)
- Live in France (2019)
- Live in Czech (2020)

Compilation albums

- Best of (2008, available only through the band's official website)
- Soundtracks of my life (2013)

Singles

- "Robot" (2008, available only through the band's official website)

DVDs

- Alive in Poland (2007)
- The Night That Will Not Die (2009)
- Live in Prague (2014)
- Live in France (2019)

== Christmas Songs ==
"*Rock 'n' Roll Christmas" featuring Mice Sciarrotta on acoustic guitar (2013)

- "It's a Long Way Home This Christmas" featuring Mice Sciarrotta on acoustic guitar and Emily Pembridge on keyboards (2014)
- "Crazy Christmas" featuring Mice Sciarrotta on acoustic guitar, and his band Absolva (2016)

== Blaze Bayley and Thomas Zwijsen ==
Acoustic albums

- December Wind (2018)

Acoustic EPs

- Russian Holiday (2013)

== Blaze Bayley and John Steel ==
Studio albums

- Freedom (2014)

== Video clips ==
Promotional videos were released for the Blood and Belief song "Hollow Head" and the Silicon Messiah song "Ghost in the Machine", but these were originally only made available to fan club members. Later on, the video for "Silicon Messiah" was put on to the second disc of a limited edition of Tenth Dimension along with an EPK titled Inside the Tenth Dimension. The video of "Hollow Head" was only made available worldwide in 2007 and can be found on the Alive in Poland DVD under the "Extras" menu. The video of "Robot" was also released in February 2009. An official video of "Russian Holyday" has been published on YouTube in 2013. In late 2013 two videos have been published via YouTube for the upcoming Best Of "Soundtracks of my life": "Hatred" and "Eating Children". In 2016 a videoclip for "Human" is released for launching the "Infinite Entanglement" album.

== Guest appearances ==
- Cerebral Fix – Bastards (1991, vocals on "Smash It Up")
- The Almighty – Powertrippin' (1993, background vocals on "Jesus Loves You ... But I Don't")
- Armageddon over Wacken Live 2004 (CD/DVD, 2005, with Doro)
- Doro – Classic Diamonds - The DVD (2004, lead vocals on "Fear of the Dark")
- Doro – 20 Years A Warrior Soul (2006, sharing vocals on "Bad Blood" and "All We Are")
- Trooper – Mercy Killer (2012) (vocals on "Mercy Killer")
- Sinnergod – vocals on "It's A Wonderful Life" (Single) (2012)
- Alekseyevskaya Ploshchad – "Hero" (digital single, 2013)
- Thomas Zwijsen - Nylonized (2014)
- Vin Sinners – "A Mighty Black Box" - (vocals on "Open The Box") (2014)
- Zix – "Tides of the Final War" - (vocals on "Metal Strike") (2016)
- Doro – Strong and Proud (2016, sharing vocals on "Fear of the Dark" live)
- Gandalf's Fist - "The Clockwork Fable" (2016) (vocals on "At the Sign of the Aperture")
- Thomas Zwijsen - Nylonized: Preserved in Time (2016) (vocals on "Judgement of Heaven")
