= Kill II This =

British metal band

- Origin: Stockport, England
- Genres: Nu metal, groove metal, industrial metal
- Years active: 1995–2004, 2014–present
- Labels: Visible Noise, Revolver
- Members: Simon Gordon; Mark Mynett; Pete Stone; Jeff Singer
- Past members: Nick Arlea; Matt Pollock; Caroline Campbell; Ben Calvert; Phillip Bretnall; Steve Rooney; Martin Wheeler
- Website: kill2this.co.uk

Kill II This (sometimes typeset as Kill 2 This) are an English groove metal/industrial metal band from Manchester.

== History ==
=== Beginnings and Another Cross II Bare (1995–1997) ===
Kill II This blend extreme metal music with elements of dance music, hip hop/trip-hop and soul. Terrorizer magazine summed it up by saying, "Their sound crosses clever industrial style sampling with fearsome guitar. Kill II This have created a beast which is threatening yet danceable."

The first album, Another Cross II Bare, was released in 1997 and featured Jeff Singer (drums), Pete Stone (Bass) and Nick Arlea (vocals). The band supported Grip Inc. and Skinlab for some UK dates in June 1997 then Megadeth on their Cryptic Writings European tour.

=== Deviate (1998–2000) ===
In 1998 the second album, Deviate, was released. Matt Pollock and Caroline Campbell were recruited for vocal and bass duties, while Ben Calvert replaced Jeff Singer on drums for touring duties after the album had been recorded. Metal Hammer's review said, "Here is an album brimming with deflowered gems; downbeat riffs that don't depress and confident grooves." 2000 saw the band on a British tour supported by Earthone 9 and Linea 77 in the spring, and on an autumn tour with Brutal Deluxe and a then-unknown Lostprophets opening.

=== Trinity (2000–2002) ===
The band's third effort, Trinity, featured Fear Factory frontman Burton C. Bell guesting on the cover of Frankie Goes to Hollywood's "Two Tribes". The album received mixed reviews. The band was confirmed as support to the Godflesh and Devin Townsend package tour of Britain during December 2001. They would also open for Soil's UK debut gig in January 2002. Kerrang! said, "Kill II This set about putting the last 20 years of heavy guitar music into a blender, and arrive at a sound that puts them out as one of THE most cutting edge bands around."

=== Mass. [Down.]-Sin.(Drone) and break-up (2002–2004) ===
The fourth album, 2003's Mass.[Down.]-Sin.(Drone), was recorded with vocalist Phil Bretnall and drummer Steve Rooney. Pete Stone returned on bass. European tours with Anthrax, Fear Factory, Type O Negative, Slipknot and Machine Head followed as well as a headline European tour with Area 54 as support.

In the Spring of 2004 Mark Mynett revealed that the fifth Kill II This album would be the band's last. However, plans for the swansong outing took on a new direction when the record, entitled, A New Spiritual Mountain, was released under the brand new band name City of God. This new outfit comprised Jeff Singer, fresh from his stints with Paradise Lost and Blaze, Simon Gordon (ex-Xentrix/Hellfighter), and Tim Preston (ex-Dearly Beheaded).

The band did not tour in support of this album and it seemed Kill II This had indeed come to an end.

=== Post-break-up (2004–2014) ===
Mark Mynett is now a Senior Lecturer in Music Technology & Production at the University of Huddersfield and currently resides in Manchester, England. Mynett had the cover feature published in November 2009's issue of Sound on Sound magazine where he discusses 'Extreme Metal Production'. Mynett still actively produces albums from the University of Huddersfield's suite of recording studios which includes five recording studios, five mixing suites, a live music production staging room and a radio studio.

=== Reformation (2014–2022) ===
In late 2014, Kill II This reformed with the original line-up of Mark Mynett, Pete Stone (bass), Jeff Singer (drums), but with a new singer, Simon Gordon (City of God) on vocals. They played a live gig in the Belgian music Festival 'La Fiesta Du Rock' on 16 October 2014. The first two new tracks to be announced are "Coma Karma" and "Sleeper Cell".

Mynett said in an interview with French metal site Metal Sickness that the new material will be akin to the Deviate album and sound, with a modern feel.

Kill II This played Bloodstock in 2016 and announced a 2016 October/November UK tour.

They released a new video, "Sleeper Cell", in May 2017 (by Chalkman Video)

In February 2019, the band released a new video, "Coma Karma", on their official YouTube channel.

On 7 January 2022, the band announced on their official Facebook page that "The new album is nearly done and we can't wait to share it with you." On 20 January 2022, the band announced on Facebook that the song "Coma Karma" will feature on the new album.

=== Variant (2024) ===
In February 2024, it was revealed that Revolver Records would release the fifth K2T album, titled Variant and substantially reworked since its 2016 announcement. The album is due out in May on CD and vinyl. It was preceded by the singles "Less Human", "Deus", "Heart-Shaped Grenade", and a new version of "Coma Karma". The first live show in support of this album will be at Funeral Fest in June.

== Line-up ==
Current members

- Simon Gordon – vocals (2014–present)
- Mark Mynett – guitar (1995–2004, 2014–present)
- Pete Stone – bass (1995–1998, 2003–2004, 2014–present)
- Jeff Singer – drums (1995–1998, 2014–present)

Previous members

- Phillip Bretnall – vocals (2002–2004)
- Steve Rooney – drums (2003–2004)
- Nick Arlea – vocals (1995–1998)
- Matt Pollock – vocals (1998–2002)
- Caroline Campbell – bass (1998–2002)
- Ben Calvert – drums (1998–2002)

== Discography ==
- 1996: Another Cross II Bare
- 1998: Deviate
- 2001: Trinity
- 2003: mass.(down.)-sin.(drone)
- 2024: Variant
