= Sinnergod =

British alternative metal band

- Origin: Wigan, England
- Genres: Alternative metal, alternative rock, gothic rock
- Years active: 2007–2022
- Members: Mark Hampson; Chris Hampson
- Past members: Dave Jones; Karl Parker; Marc Robinson; Paul Swindells; James Dunn; Sam Saint
- Website: weareawakened.com

Sinnergod are a four-piece English alternative rock band from Wigan. Their sound is recognisable as an atmospheric, layered wall of sound consisting of guitar driven riffs and symphonic keyboards. The band, previously working under the title Sinnergod, have built a fanbase following support slots with bands such as The Misfits, Bam Margera of CKY and Jackass, Orgy, Blaze Bayley, Eso formerly Esoterica, Deathstars and Sarah Jezebel Deva from Cradle of Filth, as well as a festival appearance at Bloodstock Open Air in 2007. Metal Hammer magazine labelled Sinnergod as "The new goth kings of Manchester" in the September 2014 issue.

Sinnergod have released three EPs "Two Thousand and Never", "A World in Grey" and "Behind Every Corner" and two albums The Seven Deadly Sinphonies and Sinnergod.

== History ==
=== "A World in Grey" ===
Sinnergod released "A World In Grey" on 5 May 2012, which went straight in at Number 4 in the Amazon.com Rock and Metal MP3 Download Chart, with only Led Zeppelin, Iron Maiden and Paradise Lost charted above them. The cover artwork features a 2003 image of the model Louise Amaryllis as photographed by Noel Taylor. The track listing includes the tracks "Jack" and "Monsters" which the lyrics are themed on Jack The Ripper.

=== "Behind Every Corner" ===
The "Behind Every Corner" EP features the single "It's A Wonderful Life", which was released on 1 October 2012, with the accompanying promotional music video hitting 12,000 views on YouTube within the first month.

=== Seven Deadly Sinphonies ===
Sinnergod released their debut album on 31 October 2013. The album features seven tracks all themed to the Seven Deadly Sins and includes guest appearances from Tobias Keast (Esoterica) on the track "Se7en" and Hollywood actor Bill Moseley on the track "Overture", the initial releases also featured the re-mastered bonus tracks "Bang, You're Dead" and "Ugly". Shortly after the album release keyboardist Marc Robinson announced his departure from the band, the position was filled by Paul Swindells.

The album was recorded and produced at Digiwave Studios, with the drums tracked at Fuzzbox Studios by Steve Wray of Livewire Music Productions Tobias Keast's vocals were recorded at Sabre Studios, London and Bill Moseley's narration was recorded at Travis Dickerson Recording Studios, Chatsworth, California.

The pre-release was assisted by Yellowdog Creative Project Management with post-release promotion managed by ADL Promotions.

=== 2016 self-titled album ===
2016 saw the release of the bands self titled 'sophomore' album, achieving 10/10 in the August issue of PowerPlay Magazine, the album went on to hit in excess of 100,000 streams, winning an Album of the Year award and expanding the band's fan base on a much more global scale. Live shows in support of the release included multiple Headline performances up and down the UK as well support slots with Devilment, Davey Suicide and Combichrist.

=== New single and band name change 2022 ===
On 25 October 2022 the group announced that it will change its working name from Sinnergod to We Are Awakened, this coincided with the advertisement of an upcoming video single entitled "We Lose Ourselves", due to premiere across the globe on 30 October 2022.

Details of an upcoming album are yet to be released to the press however, it is anticipated an announcement is due soon.

== Festivals and events ==
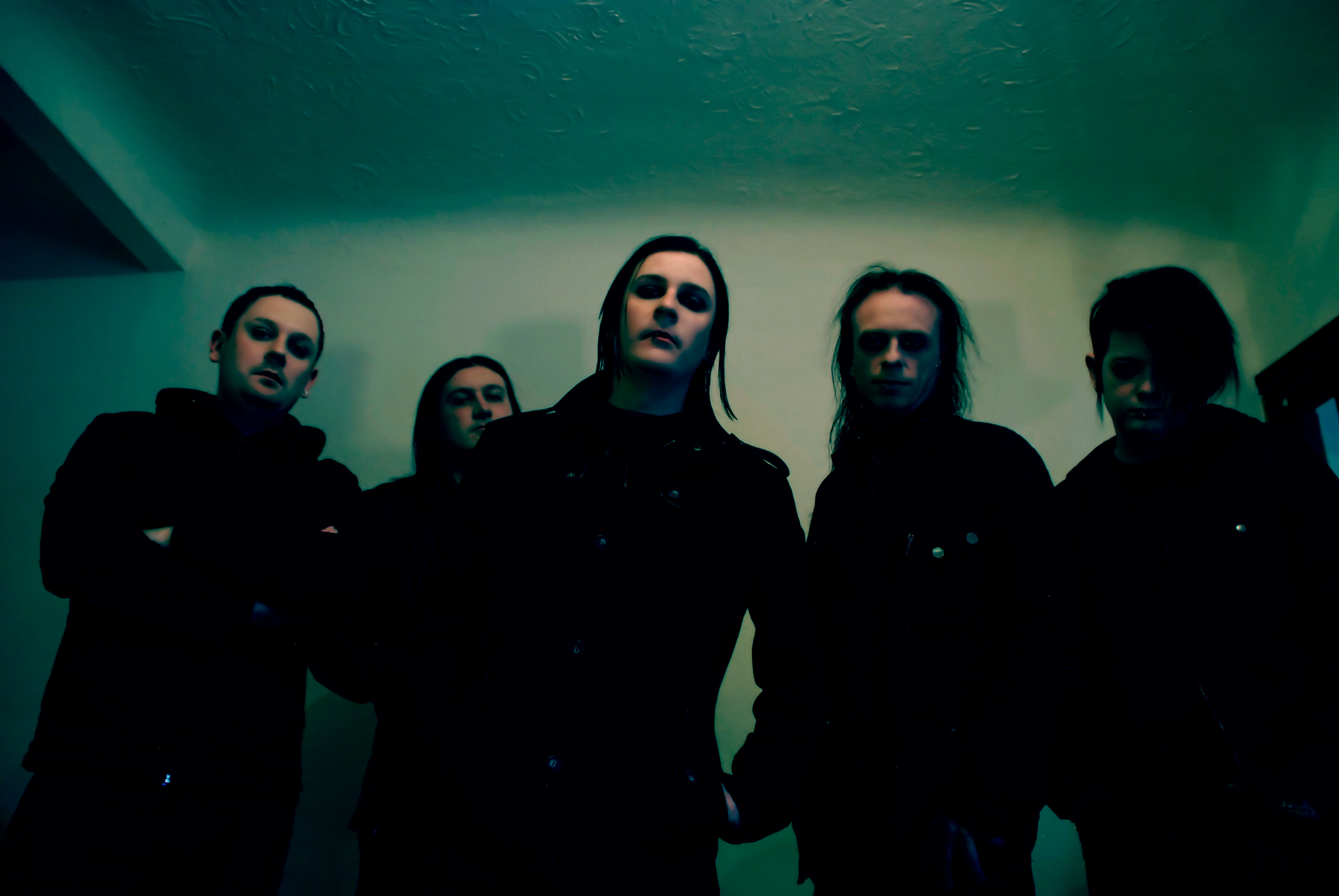
Sinnergod in 2012

Sinnergod were billed on the "Unsigned" Stage at the Bloodstock Open Air Festival on Saturday 18 August 2007, and appeared on the "Hard Rock Cafe" Stage at the 106.1 Real Radio XS Mockfest: Donisphere Festival in Manchester on 5 May 2012, this was followed by a special appearance at the Real XS Halloween Ball on 27 October 2012, with the Glitter Kittens Burlesque Dancers joining them during their set.

On 30 August 2012, Sinnergod performed a special live performance at Grand Central in Manchester featuring special guest Blaze Bayley of Wolfsbane.

=== 2013 ===
Sinnergod performed at SOS Fest and also headlined the Saturday evening at the Out of the Ashes Festival, their scheduled appearance at Trash Fest in Helsinki, Finland had to be withdrawn due to extra time being needed in the studio to meet the deadlines for the Seven Deadly Sinphonies album.

=== 2014 ===
After the cancellation of Radfest, the year began with several dates across the country including appearances at Festwich and Forever Sun alongside the Happy Mondays, Toploader, Glen Matlock of the Sex Pistols, Buzzcocks and Protafield.

Sinnergod's appearance at Alt Fest alongside acts including The Cult, Marilyn Manson, CombiChrist and Cradle Of Filth was cancelled in 2014 due to the festival suffering financial issues. Sinnergod performed at the "replacement" event "Ctrl Alt Fest Delete" which featured many of the acts that were due to play Alt fest on the Sophie Lancaster Stage.

=== 2015 ===
Sinnergod started the year by headlining The Barfly in Camden on a Camden Rocks showcase, the Summer included headline slots on the second stage at Festwich, BoltFest and RockPrest, plus a second appearance at Rock Diabetes performing alongside acts including original Iron Maiden vocalist Paul Di'Anno.

=== 2016 ===
Sinnergod announced their UK tour on 2 May 2016 which will run from August until November, also included were two pre-tour shows; a support slot with Mortiis at Manchester (but due to unforeseen circumstances this appearance had to be cancelled) and also headlining the opening night of Seddfest.

=== Previous tours ===
Sinnergod were special guests on Blaze Bayley's acoustic UK tour from 7 to 17 February 2013 featuring Thomas Zwijsen.

== Band members ==
- Mark Hampson – lead vocals, rhythm guitar (2007–2022)
- Chris Hampson – drums (2007–2022)

== Discography ==
Studio albums

- Seven Deadly Sinphonies (October 2013)
- Sinnergod (September 2016)

EPs

- Two Thousand and Never (31 October 2009)
- A World in Grey (5 May 2012)
- Behind Every Corner (12 December 2012)

Singles

- "It's a Wonderful Life" (1 October 2012)
- "Burn" (25 September 2015)
- "The Endless" (August 2016)
- "We Lose Ourselves" (October 2022)

Other appearances

- Various artists – Devolution Magazine (2014) – track "The Thirst"
- Guardians of the Riff CD – "Metal Hammer Magazine Issue 261" (2014) – track "The Thirst"
- NAPA Sports Nutrition – Music used on promotional videos from July 2016 to Present.

Music videos

- It's a Wonderful Life (2012)
- The Thirst (2013)
- Burn (2015)
- The Endless (2016)
- We Lose Ourselves (2022)
