= Deviate (album) =

Studio album by Kill II This
- Released: 6 October 1998
- Studio: DEP International Studios, Birmingham
- Genre: Nu metal; groove metal; industrial metal
- Label: Visible Noise
- Producer: Andy Sneap

Kill II This chronology
Another Cross II Bare (1996)	Deviate (1998)	Trinity (2001)

Deviate is the second studio album by English heavy metal band Kill II This, released on 6 October 1998 by Visible Noise. The album is often considered to be one of their best.

== Reception ==
Rock Hard magazine approved of the album, comparing it to the music of Clawfinger and Machine Head. French metal band Dagoba considered it one of their top-ten favourite groove metal albums of all time in 2022.

== Track listing ==
All lyrics written by and music composed by Mark Mynett.

No.	Title	Length
1.	"Soundtrack to Murder"	0:22
2.	"Kill Your Gods"	3:57
3.	"Freedom of Speech"	3:51
4.	"The Flood"	4:27
5.	"Generation Pain" ( (Note: Incorrectly referred to as "Generation Speech" on streaming services))	4:29
6.	"Funeral Around My Heart"	4:59
7.	"This World"	4:47
8.	"Mourning Sickness"	4:58
9.	"Crucified"	5:20
10.	"Faith Rape"	3:55
11.	"Twisted"	4:56
12.	"Spiral of Despair"	0:28

== Personnel ==
Content adapted from the album's liner notes.

=== Kill II This ===
- Matt Pollock – vocals
- Mark Mynett – guitar
- Caroline Campbell – bass
- Ben Calvert – drums

=== Other musical roles ===
- Jeff Singer – session drums
- Robert "Taf" Girdlestone – narration
- DJ III Dom – scratching
- Sheila M Gott – female vocals
- Taylor Wilson – operatic vocals
- Barney Greenway – additional vocals on "Freedom of Speech" and "The Flood"

=== Production, other roles ===
- Andy Sneap – production, mixing
- Danny Sprigg – engineering
- Kevin Waddington – pre-production
- Ben Aquilina – art direction
