= Dave Andrews (musician) =

British film music composer

Dave Andrews is a musician and composer of original music for film based in Buckinghamshire UK.

He has toured and played guitar for Wolfsbane and Iron Maiden singer Blaze Bayley, and also for ex-Judas Priest / Beyond Fear / Yngwie Malmsteen's Rising Force singer Tim Ripper Owens.

He was a regular contributor of original music for London's premier horror movie festival, FILM4 FrightFest between 2006 – 2012

== Professional background ==
Feature film composer credits to date are as follows:

- Beyond Fury (2019), directed by Darren Ward
- Inbred (2011), directed by Alex Chandon
- Endless (2011), directed by Matt Bloom
- Unwelcome (2011), directed by Stefan Smith
- The Making Of A Day Of Violence (2010)
- Into The Dark: Exploring The Horror Film (2009), produced by George A. Romero
- A Day Of Violence (2009), directed by Darren Ward

Short film commercial and documentary composer credits include:

- Yarns (with Gareth Humphries)
- Royal Air Forces Association/The Battle Of Britain (directed by David King)
- The Doha/Tribeca Film Festival Trailers (Doha/Tribeca FF 2009)

Short films for the Doha Film Institute:

- Lunchtime (2009)
- Um El-Sebyan: A short film by Wafa Al-Saffar (2010)
- If Only: A short film by Tusilya Muthukumar (2010)
- Garangao Nightmare: A short film by Abdulla Al-Gosaibi (2010)
