= Vin Sinners =

- Origin: Dubai, UAE
- Genres: Hard rock
- Years active: 2009–present
- Members: Vin Nair, Ahmad Rammal, Michael Schiller, Thomas Voss, Thomas Mielenz
- Website: www.vinsinnersofficial.com

Vin Sinners is a UAE based rock band started in 2009 in Chennai, India by Vin Nair a.k.a. Big Daddy Vin. Their first album, An Element of Surprise, was released in December 2011. The album was subsequently released on ArtistAloud.com to cater to Indian audiences, and within two weeks of release, three singles reached the top of the radioandmusic.com charts.

In February 2013, the band toured India and performed two shows each in Mumbai and Chennai.

The band signed to Universal Music India in February 2014.

After a brief hiatus and a series of changes in the lineup, Vin Sinners regrouped in 2017. Vin Nair along with the new band consisting of Michael Schiller on lead guitars, DJ Praful (ex-Millennium) on bass guitars, Josh on rhythm guitars and keyboards and Thomas Mielenz on drums and percussion worked on their new album called VS III. VS III which was released on 22 April 2020. The release was an independent release as the contract with Universal had run out in 2017.

== History ==
=== Early years ===
Vin Sinners was formed by Chennai-based Vin Nair who decided to make a comeback to music after a 15-year sabbatical. Nair had toyed with the idea of forming a band for years after his earlier band called Acanthus disbanded in 1994. He had earlier been a part of the church choir at Montfort Higher Secondary School in South India and it is there that he did most of his singing.

In 2009, Vin was inspired by the Indian movie Rock On!! that depicted a corporate professional making a comeback to the music scene after a few years away.

In 2010, Vin decided to work with Atif, a resident of the UAE on one song as an experiment. The song, called "The Wise Man", was written by Vin in memory of his late father, and the song was produced in less than three days. Atif and Vin began work on more songs along with Tabraiz Haroon (Mr T) on keyboards.

=== First album – An Element of Surprise ===
An Element of Surprise was launched on 9 December 2011 in Dubai.

The production of An Element of Surprise was largely a solo project with session musicians and it was only towards the end of the production that Vin Sinners as a band started to take shape. Being an independent release, the album was given respectable ratings by the now defunct Rolling Stone Middle East. Three of the album's songs made it to the weekly Top 3 spots of the radioandmusic.com charts.

=== India Tour – February 2013 ===
In July 2013, Vin Sinners' first album was released in India via digital music platform artistaloud.com. This coupled with the band's first video release on YouTube for the song "Return to Solace" saw the band's popularity in India increase. Soon after playing at the Gulf Bike Festival in October 2012, Vin Sinners announced that they had begun work on their new album and were also planning an International tour.

Vin Sinners toured India with two shows each in Mumbai and Chennai. The concerts were received well.

In December 2013, Vin Sinners announced that their new album would feature former Iron Maiden front-man Blaze Bayley on a track called "Open The Box". The track features both Vin Nair and Blaze Bayley on vocals.

=== Signing to Universal Music and Second Album – A Mighty Black Box ===
On 19 February 2014, Universal Music India signed a 3-year contract with the band and it became the first UAE based rock band to be signed by a major label. On 5 April 2014, the band released their album called A Mighty Black Box at a concert held at the Hard Rock Cafe in Dubai, UAE. Soon after, the album was made available in physical format at stores across the Middle East and India.

=== 2014–2018 ===
Soon after the 2nd album launch, the band did a few concerts through to the end of 2014. By the end of that year, Vin Nair announced that the band was taking a sabbatical and would look to regroup when the time was 'right'. In interviews later, he said that he had continued to write material with a few musicians. DJ Praful, a childhood friend of Vin Nair who is based in Bengaluru and was former bassist of India's heavy metal band, Millennium joined Vin Sinners.

In 2016, the band released a single called "Turn down the Hate" that featured new musicians along with Nair. The song would eventually find a place on the album VS III in 2020.

The band albeit with an all-new line-up except for Vin Nair, performed at a few concerts including Aldo Rock Festival held in memory of former Vin Sinners lead guitarist, Aldo Rock who died in 2017. By this time, Josh had joined the band and along with Vin, began to write a lot of new material. In September 2017, Vin Sinners performed at the United for Marawi Festival held to raise funds for the victims of the Marawi conflict in The Philippines.

By the end of 2018, a new-look, Vin Sinners had taken shape with Vin Nair (aka Big Daddy Vin) on vocals, Josh on rhythm guitars and keyboards, Michael Schiller on lead guitars, DJ Praful on bass guitars and Thomas Mielenz on drums & percussion.

=== Trinity of Sin – EP ===
While the band worked on a full length studio album, it was decided that an EP called Trinity of Sin would be released as a precursor to the band's evolving sound. It would comprise three tracks, namely "Hail Ya Sinners I" (originally released in the first album), "Hail Ya Sinners II" (originally released on the 2nd album) and an all new "Hail Ya Sinners III" that would feature the new band. The EP was released in November 2019 and a lyrics video was released for the new song.

=== Third studio album – VS III ===
The band continued to work on completing their 3rd full length studio album. Now working with a new producer, Irfan Omar from IQ Lifestyle Studios, the band had set a date of release for 22 April 2020. The 11 song record called VS III was released on that date and was made available on digital channels across the world including Spotify, Amazon, Apple Music, Anghami, and GooglePlay to name a few.

== 2020-222 ==
On 10 July 2020, Vin Sinners announced they would be releasing a new single called "Lockdown Lie". A release date has not yet been announced. Among the song is "Make Your Stand" devoted to lead vocalist Vin Nair's daughter, for which Nord Anglia choir participated.

In 2021, Josh left Vin Sinners and in 2022, DJ Praful had to leave citing personal commitments. While their exits were at the worst possible time, Vin Sinners recruited Ahmad Rammal from Lebanon who lived in Dubai at the time as their 2nd guitarist. Soon after, Thomas Voss who also hails from Frankfurt Oder and a dear friend of Michael Schiller and Thomas Mielenz, joined the band as their bassist and backing vocalist.

== 2023-2025 ==
The 4th album - 'The Next Chapter'

In 2023, Vin Sinners signed a massive production agreement with MNK Studios, one of the leading studios in the UAE to work on their 4th full-length studio album. Work began on the record with the now released 'Child of a lesser God' single which gained popularity for its reference to the plight of children in the midst of wars around the world. In 2024, the band released the 2nd single from the record 'Legends of Galwan' which was a tribute to the heroes of the Indian armed forces that staved off an attack at the Galwan pass on May 5, 2020.

Later that year, Vin Sinners announced that the band's 4th album would be called 'The Next Chapter' and would feature 10 songs including the most recent releases of 'Child of a lesser God' and 'Legends of Galwan'.

The album is due for a digital release in the fall of 2025 and a vinyl release before the end of the year.
