= Alive in Poland =

Live album by Blaze
- Released: 27 July 2007
- Recorded: 24 March 2007
- Genre: Heavy metal
- Length: 90:41
- Label: SPV
- Producer: Andy Sneap

Blaze chronology
Blood & Belief (2004)	Alive in Poland (2007)	The Man Who Would Not Die (2008)

Alive in Poland is the fifth release and second live album by English heavy metal band Blaze Bayley, released in 2007. It features mostly the band's original material, though they also play some Iron Maiden and Wolfsbane covers, as lead singer Blaze Bayley used to be in both bands.

Ray Van Horn, Jr. of Blabbermouth.net rated the album a 7.5 out of 10, describing it as "a mostly solid outing with pockets of shortfalls."

== Track listing ==
1. "Intro"
2. "Speed of Light"
3. "The Brave"
4. "Futureal" (Iron Maiden cover)
5. "Alive"
6. "Tough as Steel" (Wolfsbane cover)
7. "Man on the Edge" (Iron Maiden cover)
8. "Virus" (Iron Maiden cover)
9. "Ten Seconds"
10. "When Two Worlds Collide" (Iron Maiden cover)
11. "Look for the Truth" (Iron Maiden cover)
12. "Kill and Destroy"
13. "Silicon Messiah"
14. "Tenth Dimension"
15. "Sign of the Cross" (Iron Maiden cover)
16. "Born as a Stranger"

== Personnel ==
- Blaze Bayley – vocals
- Rich Newport – guitar
- Nick Bermudez – guitar
- David Bermudez – bass
- Rico Banderra – drums
