= The King of Metal =

Studio album by Blaze Bayley
- Released: 8 March 2012
- Genre: Heavy metal
- Length: 47:03
- Label: Blaze Bayley
- Producer: Blaze Bayley

Blaze Bayley chronology
Promise and Terror (2010)	The King of Metal (2012)	Infinite Entanglement (2016)

The King of Metal is the sixth studio album by English heavy metal vocalist Blaze Bayley, released in 2012. This is the first album that Bayley recorded where he considers himself a "Solo Artist", having parted ways with the Blaze Bayley band that recorded The Man Who Would Not Die and Promise and Terror.

== Themes ==
Bayley stated that the album is dedicated to all the fans that have supported him through the years, and that without their continued support his career would not have been possible. "The King of Metal" is the fan that supports metal music.

== Supporting tour ==
Following the release of the album, Blaze embarked upon the King of Metal World Tour, commencing with the European leg of the Tour. During this section of the tour he has played in Belgium, Netherlands, Germany, Czech Republic, Slovenia, Croatia, Bulgaria, Romania, Hungary, Poland, France, Switzerland, Spain, England, Scotland, Northern Ireland, Republic of Ireland, Wales and Italy between 8 March and 27 May 2012. King of Metal tour has been his biggest tour in a number of years.

== Reception ==
Reception to the album was generally mixed. Lior Stein of Metal Temple.com wrote "This is clearly not the best upshot of what Blaze Bayley has been working on throughout his solo career. I don’t know why there has been nothing that could top “Silicon Messiah", and I can't really answer that. "The King Of Metal" is a solid venture slightly beyond average and no more even with its good intentions."

== Track listing ==
During the recording stage of the album, Blaze ran a competition of his official forum to guess the names of the songs in the track list. He also kept a video diary during the recording which could be view on his Official Facebook page and YouTube channel.

1. The King of Metal – 2:48
2. Dimebag – 6:01
3. The Black Country – 4:38
4. The Rainbow Fades to Black – 4:33
5. Fate – 3:19
6. One More Step – 3:29
7. Fighter – 7:26
8. Judge Me – 5:16
9. Difficult – 6:05
10. Beginning – 3:34

Total Length – 47:08

All songs written by Blaze Bayley & Thomas Zwijsen, except "The Black Country" written by Blaze Bayley & Jase Edwards

== Personnel ==
- Blaze Bayley – vocals
- Thomas Zwijsen – guitar
- Andrea Neri – guitar
- Lehmann – bass
- Claudio Tirincanti – drums

== Guests ==
- Rick Plester – guitar
- Daan Willem Dragt – piano
- Tineke Roseboom – female backing vocals
