= As Live as It Gets =

Live album by Blaze
- Released: 25 March 2003
- Genre: Heavy metal
- Length: 1:40:19
- Label: SPV
- Producer: Andy Sneap

Blaze chronology
Tenth Dimension (2002)	As Live as It Gets (2003)	Blood & Belief (2004)

As Live as It Gets is the third release and first live album by English heavy metal band Blaze Bayley, then known as Blaze, released in 2003. It features mostly the band's original material, though they also play some Iron Maiden and Wolfsbane covers, as lead singer Blaze Bayley used to be in both bands. The band also covers the Led Zeppelin track "Dazed and Confused", which appeared earlier as a studio track on the Led Zeppelin tribute album The Music Remains the Same.

As Live as It Gets is the last Blaze album to feature the complete original line-up, as Jeff Singer and Rob Naylor would leave the band later on in 2003.

== Track listing ==
Disc 1
No.	Title	Writer(s)	Length
1.	"Speed of Light"	Blaze Bayley, John Slater, Steve Wray	4:59
2.	"When Two Worlds Collide" (Iron Maiden cover)	Steve Harris, Bayley, Dave Murray	6:56
3.	"Steel" (Wolfsbane cover)	Jeff Hateley, Bayley, Jase Edwards, Steve Ellett	5:10
4.	"Kill and Destroy"	Bayley, Rob Naylor, Jeff Singer, Slater, Wray	4:48
5.	"End Dream"	Bayley, Singer, Slater, Wray	5:22
6.	"Stare at the Sun"	Bayley, Naylor, Slater, Wray	7:39
7.	"Land of the Blind"	Bayley, Naylor, Slater, Wray	3:54
8.	"Silicon Messiah"	Bayley, Naylor, Slater	5:30
9.	"Dazed and Confused" (Led Zeppelin cover)	Jimmy Page	5:44

Disc 2
No.	Title	Writer(s)	Length
1.	"Virus" (Iron Maiden cover)	Harris, Bayley, Murray, Janick Gers	5:15
2.	"The Brave"	Bayley, Naylor, Wray	3:46
3.	"Stranger to the Light"	Bayley, Naylor, Slater, Wray	6:08
4.	"Identity"	Bayley, Naylor, Slater, Wray	5:01
5.	"Sign of the Cross" (Iron Maiden cover)	Harris	10:22
6.	"Futureal" (Iron Maiden cover)	Harris, Bayley	3:02
7.	"Ghost in the Machine"	Bayley, Naylor, Slater, Wray	4:32
8.	"Born As a Stranger"	Bayley, Naylor, Slater	6:18
9.	"Tenth Dimension"	Bayley, Naylor, Slater, Wray	7:03

== Personnel ==
- Blaze Bayley – vocals
- Steve Wray – guitar
- John Slater – guitar
- Rob Naylor – bass
- Jeff Singer – drums
