= Virtual XI World Tour =

1998 concert tour by Iron Maiden

- Tour by Iron Maiden
- Official tour advertisement for the band's performance at Brixton, 16 May 1998
- Associated album: Virtual XI
- Start date: 22 April 1998
- End date: 12 December 1998
- No. of shows: 83 (94 scheduled)

Iron Maiden concert chronology
- The X Factour (1995–1996); Virtual XI World Tour (1998); The Ed Hunter Tour (1999)

The Virtual XI Tour was a concert tour by the English heavy metal band Iron Maiden from 22 April 1998 to 12 December 1998. As with their previous tour, several of the band's U.S. shows had to be cancelled after vocalist Blaze Bayley had issues with his voice, this time reportedly from an allergic reaction to pollen and dust while the group were in Nevada and Arizona. The band later made up the Los Angeles and San Diego dates. This would be Iron Maiden's last tour with Bayley as then former vocalist Bruce Dickinson would return to the group the following year.

Following the more basic stage sets that they had been using following 1988's Seventh Tour of a Seventh Tour, the band returned to a more elaborate stage set in 1998. The tour also saw the group make their first visits to Turkey and Malta.

== Tour dates ==
List of 1998 concerts
| Date | City | Country | Venue |
|---|---|---|---|
| 22 April 1998 | Norwich | England | The Oval P.H.^{1} |
| 26 April 1998 | Lille | France | Zénith de Lille |
| 27 April 1998 | Nancy | France | Le Zénith |
| 29 April 1998 | Genova | Italy | Palasport |
| 30 April 1998 | Florence | Italy | Palasport |
| 2 May 1998 | Pesaro | Italy | BPA Palace |
| 3 May 1998 | Rome | Italy | PalaEur |
| 5 May 1998 | Milan | Italy | PalaVobis |
| 6 May 1998 | Trieste | Italy | Palasport |
| 8 May 1998 | Böblingen | Germany | Sporthalle |
| 9 May 1998 | Hanover | Germany | Music Hall |
| 10 May 1998 | Düsseldorf | Germany | Philips Halle |
| 12 May 1998 | Paris | France | Le Zénith |
| 13 May 1998 | Leuven | Belgium | Brabanthal |
| 14 May 1998 | Rotterdam | Netherlands | Ahoy Hall |
| 16 May 1998 | London | England | Brixton Academy |
| 18 May 1998 | Barcelona | Spain | Pavelló de la Vall d'Hebron |
| 19 May 1998 | Madrid | Spain | Palacio de los Deportes |
| 20 May 1998 | Cascais | Portugal | Pavilion |
| 22 May 1998 | Ourense | Spain | Campo de Futbol Os Remedios |
| 23 May 1998 | Laguna de Duero | Spain | Bullring |
| 24 May 1998 | San Sebastián | Spain | Velodromo |
| 26 May 1998 | Valencia | Spain | Velodromo Luis Puig |
| 28 May 1998 | Montpellier | France | Le Zénith |
| 30 May 1998 | Ta' Qali | Malta | Open Air |
| 26 June 1998 | Chicago | United States | Riviera Theater |
| 27 June 1998 | Columbus | United States | Brewery District Pavilion |
| 28 June 1998 | Hamilton | Canada | Copps Coliseum |
| 30 June 1998 | Kalamazoo | United States | Wings Stadium |
| 1 July 1998 | Clarkston | United States | Pine Knob Music Theater |
| 2 July 1998 | Cleveland | United States | Nautica Theater |
| 4 July 1998 | Montreal | Canada | Stade du Maurier |
| 5 July 1998 | Quebec City | Canada | L'Agora |
| 7 July 1998 | New York City | United States | Roseland Ballroom |
| 10 July 1998 | San Antonio | United States | Blue Bonnet Palace |
| 11 July 1998 | San Benito | United States | The Road House |
| 12 July 1998 | Dallas | United States | Starplex Amphitheater |
| 14 July 1998 | Phoenix | United States | Club Rio |
| 15 July 1998 | Paradise | United States | The Joint |
| ~~19 July 1998~~ | San Francisco | United States | Maritime Hall |
| ~~22 July 1998~~ | Denver | United States | Paramount Theatre |
| ~~24 July 1998~~ | Medina | United States | Medina Entertainment Center |
| ~~25 July 1998~~ | Milwaukee | United States | Modjeska Theater |
| ~~26 July 1998~~ | Cincinnati | United States | Bogart's |
| ~~28 July 1998~~ | Washington, D.C. | United States | The Capitol Ballroom |
| ~~29 July 1998~~ | Glen Burnie | United States | Michael's Eighth Avenue |
| ~~31 July 1998~~ | Philadelphia | United States | Electric Factory |
| ~~1 August 1998~~ | Hartford | United States | Webster Theater |
| 2 August 1998 | Universal City | United States | Universal Amphitheater |
| 4 August 1998 | San Diego | United States | S.D.S.U. Open Air Theater |
| 5 August 1998 | Melbourne | United States | Wickham Park Amphitheater |
| 7 August 1998 | Monterrey | Mexico | Auditorio Coca-Cola |
| 9 August 1998 | Mexico City | Mexico | Palacio de los Deportes |
| 4 September 1998 | Athens | Greece | Lycabettus Theatre |
| 5 September 1998 | Thessaloniki | Greece | Forrest Theatre |
| 7 September 1998 | Istanbul | Turkey | Cemil Topuzlu Açıkhava |
| 8 September 1998 | Istanbul | Turkey | Cemil Topuzlu Açıkhava |
| ~~9 September 1998~~ | Sarajevo | Bosnia and Herzegovina | Skenderija |
| 11 September 1998 | Budapest | Hungary | E-Klub |
| 12 September 1998 | Katowice | Poland | Spodek |
| 13 September 1998 | Prague | Czech Republic | Malá sportovní hala |
| 15 September 1998 | Munich | Germany | Colosseum |
| 16 September 1998 | Fürth | Germany | Stadthalle Fürth |
| 18 September 1998 | Erfurt | Germany | Thüringen Halle |
| 19 September 1998 | Hamburg | Germany | Sporthalle |
| 20 September 1998 | Copenhagen | Denmark | Vega |
| 23 September 1998 | Helsinki | Finland | Helsingfors ishall |
| 25 September 1998 | Stockholm | Sweden | Isstadion |
| 27 September 1998 | Essen | Germany | Grugahalle |
| 28 September 1998 | Berlin | Germany | Colombia Halle |
| 29 September 1998 | Halle | Germany | Easy Schorre Club |
| 1 October 1998 | Offenbach am Main | Germany | Stadthalle |
| 2 October 1998 | Winterthur | Switzerland | Eulachalle |
| 3 October 1998 | Mulhouse | France | Phoenix |
| 5 October 1998 | Besançon | France | Palais des Sports |
| 6 October 1998 | Lyon | France | Le Transbordeur |
| 8 October 1998 | Zaragoza | Spain | Pabellón Principe Felipe |
| 9 October 1998 | Albacete | Spain | Bullring |
| 10 October 1998 | Dos Hermanas | Spain | Campo de Fútbol |
| 13 October 1998 | Nice | France | Théâtre de Verdure |
| 14 October 1998 | Pau | France | Le Zénith |
| 15 October 1998 | Clermont-Ferrand | France | Maison des Sports |
| 17 October 1998 | Manchester | England | Apollo Theatre |
| 18 October 1998 | Newcastle | England | City Hall |
| 19 October 1998 | Glasgow | Scotland | Barrowlands |
| 21 October 1998 | Nottingham | England | Royal Concert Hall |
| 22 October 1998 | Wolverhampton | England | Civic Hall |
| 23 October 1998 | Newport | Wales | Centre |
| 25 October 1998 | Sheffield | England | City Hall |
| 26 October 1998 | Portsmouth | England | Guildhall |
| 18 November 1998 | Tokyo | Japan | Shibuya Kokaido |
| 20 November 1998 | Nagoya | Japan | Club Diamond Hall |
| 21 November 1998 | Osaka | Japan | IMP Hall |
| 22 November 1998 | Tokyo | Japan | Nakano Sun Plaza Hall |
| 2 December 1998 | Rio de Janeiro | Brazil | Metropolitan |
| ~~4 December 1998~~ | Campinas | Brazil | Brinco Da Princesa |
| 5 December 1998 | São Paulo | Brazil | Anhembi |
| 6 December 1998 | Curitiba | Brazil | Pedreira Paulo Leminski |
| ~~10 December 1998~~ | Santiago | Chile | Velodromo |
| 12 December 1998 | Buenos Aires | Argentina | José Amalfitani Stadium |

- ^Note 1 This was a secret concert that the band performed under the name "The Angel and the Gamblers".
