= Virus (Iron Maiden song) =

1996 single by Iron Maiden

Single by Iron Maiden

from the album Best of the Beast
- B-side: "My Generation"; "Doctor Doctor"; "Prowler"; "Invasion"; "Sanctuary"; "Wrathchild"
- Released: 9 September 1996
- Length: 6:14; 3:54 (short version)
- Label: EMI United Kingdom
- Songwriters: Blaze Bayley; Dave Murray; Janick Gers; Steve Harris
- Producers: Steve Harris; Nigel Green

Iron Maiden singles chronology
| "Lord of the Flies" (1996) | "Virus" (1996) | "The Angel and the Gambler" (1998) |

CD 1 cover

CD 2 cover

"Virus" is a song by English heavy metal band Iron Maiden, released as a single in September 1996. It is the first single since 1980's "Women in Uniform" that does not appear on any official Iron Maiden studio album; however, it was included on the band's first career retrospective – 1996's double-disc Best of the Beast. It is the only Iron Maiden song to be credited to both of the band's guitarists. It has never been performed live by Iron Maiden, but Blaze Bayley has performed it several times in his solo career.

== Background ==
In order to celebrate the band's 21 years, the single was released in three different formats. The first format, contains a short edit omitting the intro and features the same B-sides as the "Lord of the Flies" single from 1996, which included covers from The Who and UFO. These tracks were previously unreleased in the UK. The second features the full-length unedited version and songs from the 1980 compilation album Metal for Muthas, which marks the only studio recordings to feature former guitarist Tony Parsons. The third features two songs from Maiden's legendary 1979 demo recordings, The Soundhouse Tapes.

The single was the last until 2015's "Speed of Light" to use the classic variant of the band's logo: every single release from 1998's "The Angel and the Gambler" to 2010's "El Dorado" used an alternate that removed the extended ends of the "R", "M", and both "N"s.

On the EP Slow Riot for New Zero Kanada by instrumental rock group Godspeed You! Black Emperor, the track "BBF3" features a vox pop interview to a person going by the name of Blaise Bailey Finnegan III who recites a poem made from the lyrics from "Virus", written by Blaze Bayley.

The intro riff was used by the Bristol-based trio Kosheen on the song "I Want It All" from their 2001 album Resist.

== Track listings ==
CD 1

1. "Virus (Short Version)" (Steve Harris, Janick Gers, Dave Murray, Blaze Bayley) - 3:54
2. "My Generation" (Pete Townshend; The Who cover) - 3:39
3. "Doctor Doctor" (Michael Schenker, Phil Mogg; UFO cover) - 4:50

CD 2

1. "Virus" (Harris, Gers, Murray, Bayley) - 6:14
2. "Sanctuary" (Harris; from the 1979 compilation album Metal for Muthas) - 3:33
3. "Wrathchild" (Harris; from the 1979 compilation album Metal for Muthas) - 3:06

12-inch vinyl

1. "Virus" (Harris, Gers, Murray, Bayley)
2. "Prowler" (Harris; from the 1978 demo The Soundhouse Tapes)
3. "Invasion" (Harris; from the 1978 demo The Soundhouse Tapes)

== Personnel ==
Production credits are adapted from the CD single.

Iron Maiden

- Blaze Bayley – lead vocals ("Virus", "My Generation", "Doctor Doctor")
- Dave Murray – guitar
- Janick Gers – guitar ("Virus", "My Generation", "Doctor Doctor")
- Steve Harris – bass guitar, producer, mixing
- Nicko McBrain – drums ("Virus", "My Generation", "Doctor Doctor")
- Paul Di'Anno – lead vocals ("Prowler", "Invasion". "Sanctuary", "Wrathchild")
- Doug Sampson – drums ("Prowler", "Invasion", "Sanctuary", "Wrathchild")
- Tony Parsons – guitar ("Sanctuary", "Wrathchild")
- Paul Cairns – guitar (uncredited) ("Prowler, "Invasion")

'Production

- Nigel Green – producer, mixing
- Neal Harrison – producer ("Sanctuary", "Wrathchild")

== Charts ==
| Chart (1996) | Peak position |
|---|---|
| Europe (Eurochart Hot 100) | 39 |
| Finland (Suomen virallinen lista) | 3 |
| Netherlands (Single Top 100) | 48 |
| Scotland Singles (Official Charts) | 21 |
| Sweden (Sverigetopplistan) | 31 |
| UK Singles (Official Charts) | 16 |
| UK Rock & Metal (Official Charts) | 4 |
