= Rock the Coast =

Rock the Coast is a concert put on by Muskegon, Michigan-based Alive on the Lakeshore. The event was presented for several years at the amusement park Michigan's Adventure. As of 2017, Rock the Coast took place at Ottawa County Fairgrounds in Holland, Michigan. It features Christian artists, including Crowder, Hillsong Young & Free, Plumb, Josh Wilson, Audio Adrenaline, Roper, and Toby Mac. Rock the Coast is typically held in May. In the past, the concert has featured several acts, among those Kutless, Family Force Five, BarlowGirl, Hawk Nelson, Everlife, Fireflight, John Reuben, and Superchick.

The festival is a member of the Christian Festival Association.

== Background ==
The Rock the Coast festival is an annual event held in Michigan. Its roots go back to the original Summer Festival in Muskegon Unity. The festival is aimed at the youth and Christian rock bands are the medium.

The festival began in May 2004 at Michigan's Adventure amusement park, north of Muskegon. In addition to the music, patrons who numbered 2000 to 4000 took part in other attractions which included park rides. In 2012 there was no event but the following year, it returned with a bigger variety. However, it stopped again. The organizers were hopeful for a return, and after a downtime of three years, it returned it 2017. It had also shifted its location from Muskegon to Holland at the Ottawa County Fairgrounds. The festival director at the time was Kevin Newton.

== History ==
The 2008 event was on Saturday 17 May with the gates opening at 11:00 am. The concert was set to commence at mid-day. The Christian rock bands booked to appear were, Secondhand, Good Luck Varsity, Pete Cornelius Band and The Advent. The concert stage was also reserved for worship at 11:00 am on Sunday.

Now in its sixth year in 2009, the main drawcard was the band Sanctus Real. The group which topped the Christian music charts had a way of delivering the message via its music, melody and lyrics to get the Christ message across. Also booked to appear on the main stage were The Afters, Fireflight, Everlife, and The Fabulous.

The headline act for 2010 was Hawk Nelson who performed previously in 2008. Other acts booked to appear were Superchick, John Reuben and Bread of Stone.

2017 saw the festival back in operation after a three-year break. One of the acts booked was Plumb aka Tiffany Arbuckle Lee. The other acts to appear were, David Crowder, and Josh Wilson. The emcee was George Moss.

The 2022 festival was to support children and their families affected by cancer.
