= Yellowdog Creative Project Management =

- Founded: 2011
- Founder: Sam O'Doherty
- Distributor: Blacklake Design / Plastic Head Distribution
- Genre: Folk / acoustic / rock / indie / heavy metal
- Country of origin: International
- Location: United Kingdom / France / Netherlands
- Official website: Yellowdog CPM Website

Yellowdog Creative Project Management (also known as 'Yellowdog CPM' or just 'Yellowdog') is an independent record label, project management platform, tour management and promotions representing a variety of artists and bands. The business trades in the United Kingdom, France, Netherlands, Italy, Sweden, Ireland & United States.

== Notable artists ==
- Blaze Bayley
- Thomas Zwijsen
- Monkey Anna
- Clownage
- Neurasthenia
- Kathryn Prescott
- John Parker

== Discography ==
- Russian Holiday, EP, 2013, Blaze Bayley
- Nylon Maiden, Album, 2013, Thomas Zwijsen
- Icarus, EP, 2013, John Parker & Sam O'Doherty

== Master Guitar Tour 2014 ==
In 2014 Yellowdog organised the Master Guitar Tour featuring Thomas Zwijsen, Benjamin Woods and Glenn Roth. The show is a fusion of the three guitarists styles: classical guitar, flamenco and fingerstyle.

The 2014 tour listing is:

- 25/04 Créateur Culinair, Sint-Gillis-Waas, B
- 26/04 Michael Collins Club, Brussels, B
- 27/04 Club Razzmatazz, Oost-Souburg, NL
- 30/04 Templet, Copenhagen, DK
- 03/05 Black Hand Inn, Gadenstedt, D
- 05/05 Attic Rock Club, Litvinov, CZ
- 06/05 Melodka, Brno, CZ
- 08/05 Club Reigen Live, Vienna, AT
- 13/05 Molly Malone's Club, Timișoara, R
- 15/05 Club Adams, Sofia, BG
- 17/05 Il Peocio, Turin, IT
- 18/05 Auditorium Communale, Modella, IT
- 23/05 Cricketers, Dover, UK
- 24/05 O2 Academy2, London, UK
- 25/05 The Musician, Leicester, UK
- 26/05 The Tudor, Wigan, UK
- 28/05 Brudenell Social Club, Leeds, UK
- 30/05 Bronzen Beelden Festival, Hulst, NL

== See also ==
- List of record labels
