= Silicon Messiah =

Studio album by Blaze
- Released: 22 May 2000
- Recorded: Early 2000
- Genre: Heavy metal
- Length: 52:06
- Label: SPV
- Producer: Andy Sneap

Blaze chronology
Silicon Messiah (2000)	Tenth Dimension (2002)

Professional ratings
Review scores
Source	Rating
Kerrang!	2/5 stars
Metal Hammer	9/10

Silicon Messiah is the debut studio album by English heavy metal band Blaze, the band which formed by Blaze Bayley, released in 2000, and being the first album since the departure of Bayley from Iron Maiden in 1999.

Original Japanese and South American pressings included bonus tracks: "The Day I Fell to Earth" was included in both territories, while South American pressings additionally included "Motherfuckers R Us" and a live cover of the Wolfsbane song "Steel", along with an interactive track. With the exception of the interactive track, these bonus tracks were subsequently reissued internationally on the 15th anniversary edition of the album in 2015. The cover artwork on the album features an image of Blaze Bayley with his skin coloured blue and covered with computer circuitry.

== Writing ==
The song "Born As a Stranger" is based on the Robert A. Heinlein novel Stranger in a Strange Land and was originally intended for Iron Maiden. Blaze Bayley began writing the track for his intended third album with the band, but when he was replaced as lead singer by the returning Bruce Dickinson, Bayley instead repurposed the song for Silicon Messiah. Bayley's tenure with Iron Maiden also informed the bonus tracks "The Day I Fell to Earth", which deals with his abrupt departure from the band, and "Motherfuckers R Us", which recalls a concert on the North American leg of the Virtual XI World Tour.

Other influences on the album include Do Androids Dream of Electric Sheep? by Philip K. Dick, which inspired the song "Identity", and the film Gattaca, upon which both "Reach for the Horizon" and "The Launch" were based.

== Track listing ==
No.	Title	Writer(s)	Length
1.	"Ghost in the Machine"	Blaze Bayley, Rob Naylor, John Slater, Steve Wray	4:21
2.	"Evolution"	Bayley, Naylor, Jeff Singer, Slater, Wray	4:55
3.	"Silicon Messiah"	Bayley, Naylor, Slater	5:12
4.	"Born As a Stranger"	Bayley, Naylor, Slater	5:53
5.	"The Hunger"	Bayley, Singer, Slater, Wray	7:06
6.	"The Brave"	Bayley, Naylor, Wray	4:04
7.	"Identity"	Bayley, Naylor, Slater, Wray	5:26
8.	"Reach for the Horizon"	Bayley, Phil Hilborne	4:31
9.	"The Launch"	Bayley, Naylor, Singer, Wray	2:53
10.	"Stare at the Sun"	Bayley, Naylor, Slater, Wray	7:50

15th anniversary edition bonus tracks
No.	Title	Writer(s)	Length
11.	"The Day I Fell to Earth"	Bayley, Naylor, Singer, Wray	3:55
12.	"Motherfuckers R Us"	Bayley, Naylor, Singer, Wray	3:49
13.	"Steel" (live, Wolfsbane cover)	Jeff Hateley, Bayley, Jase Edwards, Steve Ellett	5:04

== Personnel ==
- Blaze Bayley – vocals
- Steve Wray – guitar
- John Slater – guitar
- Rob Naylor – bass
- Jeff Singer – drums
