= Promise and Terror =

Studio album by Blaze Bayley
- Released: 1 February 2010
- Genre: Heavy metal
- Length: 55:42
- Label: Blaze Bayley Records
- Producer: Blaze Bayley, Jase Edwards

Blaze Bayley chronology
The Man Who Would Not Die (2008)	Promise and Terror (2010)	The King of Metal (2012)

Promise and Terror is the fifth studio album by English heavy metal band Blaze Bayley, released in 2010. It is the second studio album released by the band since they changed their name from Blaze, and the last album which Blaze Bayley established as the band, before Bayley himself decided to change the format as a solo artist for his subsequent albums. It is also the first Blaze Bayley album without a title track.

== Themes ==
The songs on Promise and Terror are very diverse in their themes; the first half of the album is more upbeat and positive, but the second half is darker and more introspective. "Surrounded by Sadness", the first acoustic song since the band changed their name, starts a four-song run-in, as the last songs on the album are thematically connected. As stated in the sleeve notes inside the album cover, the last four songs follow the four steps of dealing with personal tragedy: loss, pain, grief and acceptance. These songs mostly address the loss of Bayley's wife and the struggle he and the band have had in the music world.

== Reception ==
Professional ratings
Review scores
Source	Rating
AllMusic	3.5/5 stars
BW & BK	9/10 stars
Sea of Tranquility	4/5 stars
Metal-Temple.com	4.5/5 stars

The pre-sale for Promise and Terror quickly became the biggest in Blaze Bayley's history, as it charted at number 3 on UK pre-orders before its release. Blaze Bayley himself has stated that Promise and Terror is his best-selling solo album to date.

Professional reviews for the album have ranged from positive to enthusiastic.

== Track listing ==
1. "Watching the Night Sky" – 3:36
2. "Madness and Sorrow" – 3:09
3. "1633" – 6:03
4. "God of Speed" – 5:48
5. "City of Bones" – 6:26
6. "Faceless" – 3:46
7. "Time to Dare" – 5:41
8. "Surrounded by Sadness" – 3:59
9. "The Trace of Things That Have No Words" – 5:48
10. "Letting Go of the World" – 6:24
11. "Comfortable in Darkness" – 4:29

== Personnel ==
- Blaze Bayley – vocals
- Nico Bermudez – lead guitar
- Jay Walsh – rhythm guitar
- David Bermudez – bass
- Lawrence Paterson – drums
- Jase Edwards – producer, first guitar solo on Madness and Sorrow.
