= Thomas Zwijsen =

Belgian guitarist (born 1988)

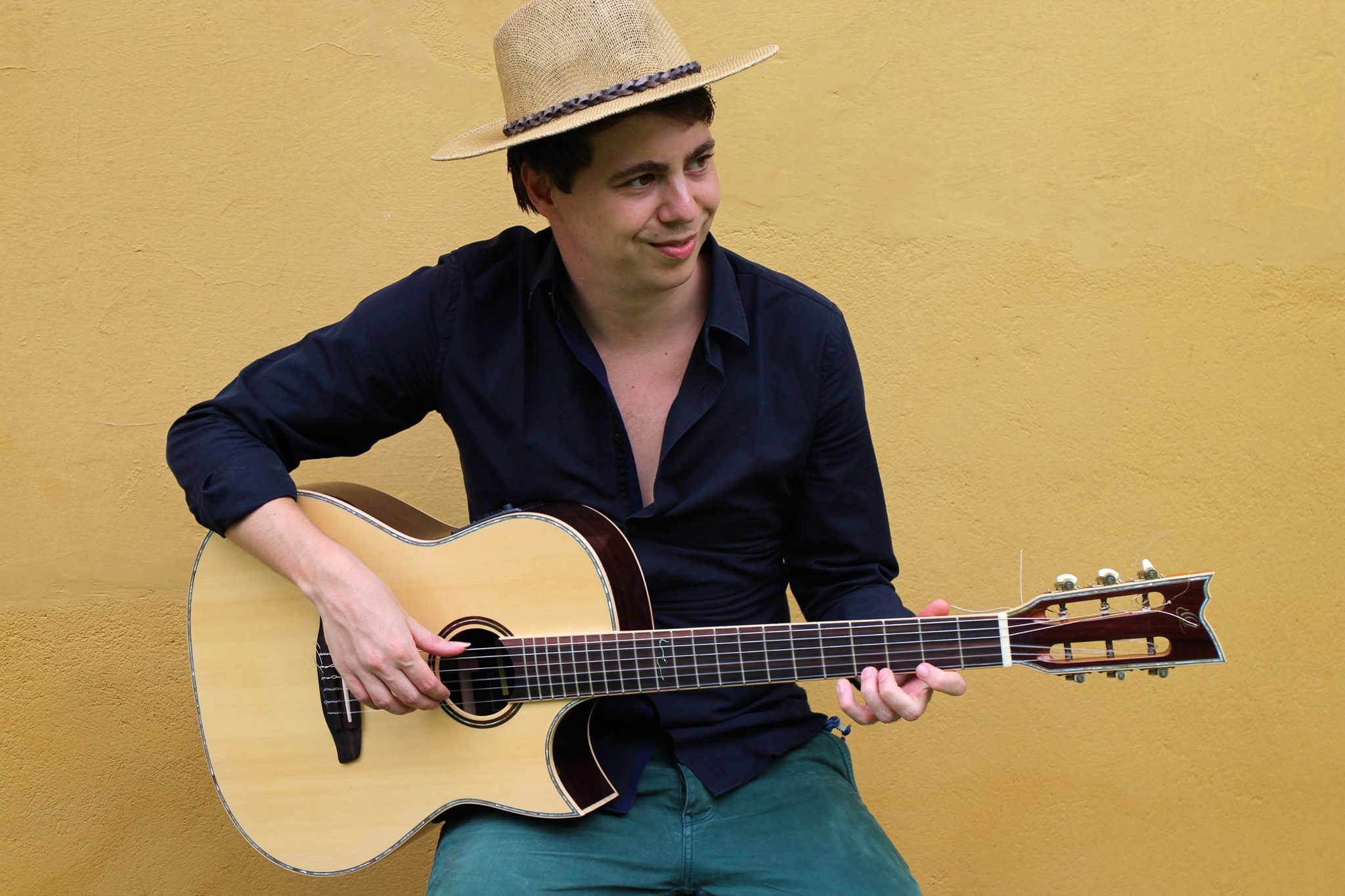
- Zwijsen in 2015

Background information
- Born: 25 April 1988 (age 38); Antwerp, Belgium
- Genres: Classical metal, flamenco rock, heavy metal, instrumental rock, progressive rock, jazz fusion
- Occupation: Musician
- Instrument: Guitar
- Years active: 2007–present
- Labels: Blacklake, Yellowdog, King
- Members: (Studio & live bands vary): Nathanael Taekema (drums); Anne Bakker (violin); Anton Zwijsen (bodhrán, bass); Rosie Taekema (cello); Raoul Soentken (percussion)
- Website: thomaszwijsen.com

Thomas Zwijsen is a Dutch/Belgian (Flemish) guitarist. He is known for his arrangements of Iron Maiden (and a selection of other artists') songs for classical guitar both on YouTube since 2007 and with his 2013 and 2014 albums "Nylon Maiden", "Nylonized" and "Nylon Maiden II". Since 2011, he has worked closely with ex Iron Maiden and Wolfsbane frontman Blaze Bayley, co-composing Bayley's 2012 album The King of Metal and 2013 released Russian Holiday EP. In 2015, he released an album in Flamenco/fusion style consisting entirely of his own compositions, entitled "Divide & Unite".

He has toured extensively both with Blaze, as a solo performer and since 2013 with the Master Guitar Tour, bringing him across Europe, South America and to Dubai. Thomas is particularly popular on YouTube, having reached more than 28.7 million views and 132.000+ subscribers as of 2020. This is a significant amount of traffic, considering his genre.

== Biography ==
Thomas Zwijsen was born on 25 April 1988 in Antwerp, Belgium. He started taking music lessons at age nine. During his teens he studied Classical Guitar at several conservatories in Belgium and the Netherlands. He also played in a local band called Sarcadia.

From 2007, Zwijsen began creating YouTube videos. His main focus was making arrangements of Iron Maiden songs for classical guitar. He also made arrangements of Dream Theater and Deep Purple songs, to name a few. These videos gained in popularity, leading to over six million hits and 27,000 subscribers as of March 2015.

Due to his online popularity, Thomas was inspired to create a solo album with 11 of his Iron Maiden arrangements, called Nylon Maiden. He collaborated closely with drummer Nathanael Taekema and Edgetip Studio in Arnhem, Netherlands. Later, he attracted interest from former Iron Maiden and Wolfsbane frontman Blaze Bayley, who performed guest vocals on "The Clansman". This co-operation led to Thomas joining Blaze during his composition and production process for the 2012 album The King of Metal, and its subsequent tour. Additional musicians on the Nylon Maiden album were Anne Bakker (violin), Nathanael Taekema (drums) and Tony Newton (Voodoo Six, bass).

The King of Metal tour with Blaze Bayley took him across Europe and further cemented an ongoing musical relationship with the singer. This led to a subsequent European acoustic tour featuring only Blaze and Thomas, later developing into a world tour for 2013 in which Zwijsen would open with a Nylon Maiden set list, followed by a full acoustic Blaze show afterwards. Anne Bakker (violinist) was also present for the Brazilian leg of the tour.

Supporting his 2012/2013 album release, Zwijsen also toured with Maiden uniteD, the all-acoustic Maiden tribute project featuring singer Damian Wilson (Threshold) and guitarist Ruud Jolie (Within Temptation), on most of their European dates in November and December 2012.

During 2013, Zwijsen continued his world tour with Blaze, taking him to South America, Europe and Dubai. In spring 2013, his Nylon Maiden album was released in Japan including three bonus tracks under the Japanese record label King Records.

Spring 2013 also saw the release of a collaborative EP by Blaze Bayley & Thomas Zwijsen, called Russian Holiday.

In early 2014, Zwijsen released Nylonized, a 12 track album featuring an eclectic mix of song arrangements (ranging from The Who to Adele), original compositions and guest artists. Among the twelve guest musicians on the album are: Kee Marcello (Europe – guitar), Derek Sherinian (Dream Theater, Black Country Communion – piano), David Readman (Pink Cream 69 – vocals), Damian Wilson (Threshold, Headspace – vocals), and Blaze Bayley (Iron Maiden – vocals). 3 original compositions are featured on the album, co-written with drummer Nathanael Taekema, including a nine-minute flamenco-metal opera called "Perfect Storm".

In 2014, Zwijsen released Nylon Maiden II, the sequel to his first album. Featuring a new selection of popular Iron Maiden songs (and "Doctor Doctor" by UFO) arranged for classical guitar, he also showcased a couple of original compositions: "Nylon Madness" and "The Dream Is True".

Zwijsen released his first album entirely of original work on 3 October 2015. Divide & Unite contains 11 original compositions in a flamenco fusion style, supported on Drums and co-composed by Nathanael Taekema for six of the tracks. Other musicians appearing on the album are Anne Bakker (Violin, Viola), Rosie Taekema (Cello), Raoul Soentken (Percussion, mixing and mastering) and a guest appearance by American flamenco guitarist (and Master Guitar tour co-artist) Ben Woods. The songs display Thomas' classical background, as well as subtle influences of (progressive) rock and metal. An Extended Production by the name of "Treasure Island" was released simultaneously containing four tracks plus hidden bonus of various rock arrangements for classical guitar and trio.

== Guitar technique ==
Thomas studied classical and flamenco guitar at music conservatoire. This has influenced his playing style, which is a unique mix of classical elements and his Heavy/Progressive Metal roots. Thomas' technique reflects an interesting and often technical fusion between these influences.

== Endorsements ==
Zwijsen is currently (2013) endorsed by: Ortega Guitars, The Guitar Villa and Griffin Allstar.

== Discography ==
=== Studio albums ===
Year	Album	Description
With Blaze Bayley
2012	The King of Metal	Co-composed with Blaze
2013	Russian Holiday EP	Co-composed with Blaze
2016	Infinite Entanglement	Acoustic Guitar on "What Will Come"
2018	December Wind	
Solo albums
2013	Nylon Maiden	Classical guitar arrangements of Iron Maiden hits
2014	Nylonized	Arrangements from several artists and original compositions ft. special guests
2014	Nylon Maiden II	Classical guitar arrangements of Iron Maiden hits & original compositions
2015	Divide & Unite	11 original virtuosic compositions in flamenco/fusion style
2015	Treasure Island EP	4 arranged rock songs (Iron Maiden, Queen, KISS, Judas Priest) plus a secret track
2016	Preserved in Time	Double CD Nylon Maiden album with special guest Blaze Bayley
2018	Nylon Metal	Double CD with acoustic arrangements of various Iron Maiden, KISS, Metallica, Deep Purple, Helloween, Led Zeppelin, Dream Theater songs
2019	Nylon Metal II	
2020	Nylon Maiden Lives On	
2020	Uke 'em All EP	
2021	Nylon Maiden V	
