= Tenth Dimension =

Studio album by Blaze
- Released: 15 January 2002
- Recorded: 2001
- Genre: Heavy metal
- Length: 52:53
- Label: SPV
- Producer: Andy Sneap

Blaze chronology
Silicon Messiah (2000)	Tenth Dimension (2002)	As Live as It Gets (2003)

Professional ratings
Review scores
Source	Rating
The Metal Crypt	5/5 stars
Rock Hard	7.5/10
Blabbermouth.net	8/10

Tenth Dimension is the second studio album by English heavy metal band Blaze Bayley, then known as Blaze, released in 2002. It is a concept album.

== Track listing ==
Disc 1
No.	Title	Writer(s)	Length
1.	"Forgotten Future" (instrumental)	Blaze Bayley, Rob Naylor, John Slater, Steve Wray	1:03
2.	"Kill and Destroy"	Bayley, Naylor, Jeff Singer, Slater, Wray	4:27
3.	"End Dream"	Bayley, Singer, Slater, Wray	5:14
4.	"The Tenth Dimension"	Bayley, Naylor, Slater, Wray	6:18
5.	"Nothing Will Stop Me"	Bayley, Naylor, Wray	4:21
6.	"Leap of Faith"	Bayley, Naylor, Singer, Wray	3:38
7.	"The Truth Revealed"	Bayley, Slater, Wray	1:44
8.	"Meant to Be"	Bayley, Wray	6:26
9.	"Land of the Blind"	Bayley, Naylor, Slater, Wray	3:56
10.	"Stealing Time"	Bayley, Naylor, Slater, Wray	4:37
11.	"Speed of Light"	Bayley, Slater, Wray	4:43
12.	"Stranger to the Light"	Bayley, Naylor, Slater, Wray	6:33

Disc 2 (bonus disc)
No.	Title	Writer(s)	Length
1.	"The Launch" (live)	Bayley, Naylor, Singer, Wray	2:58
2.	"Futureal" (live, Iron Maiden cover)	Steve Harris, Bayley	3:29
3.	"Steel" (live, Wolfsbane cover)	Jeff Hateley, Bayley, Jase Edwards, Steve Ellett	5:04
4.	"Evolution" (live)	Bayley, Naylor, Singer, Slater, Wray	4:07
5.	"Living Someone Else's Life"	Bayley, Naylor, Singer, Slater, Wray	4:47

== Personnel ==
- Blaze Bayley – vocals
- Steve Wray – guitar
- John Slater – guitar
- Rob Naylor – bass
- Jeff Singer – drums
