= Jeff Singer =

British drummer

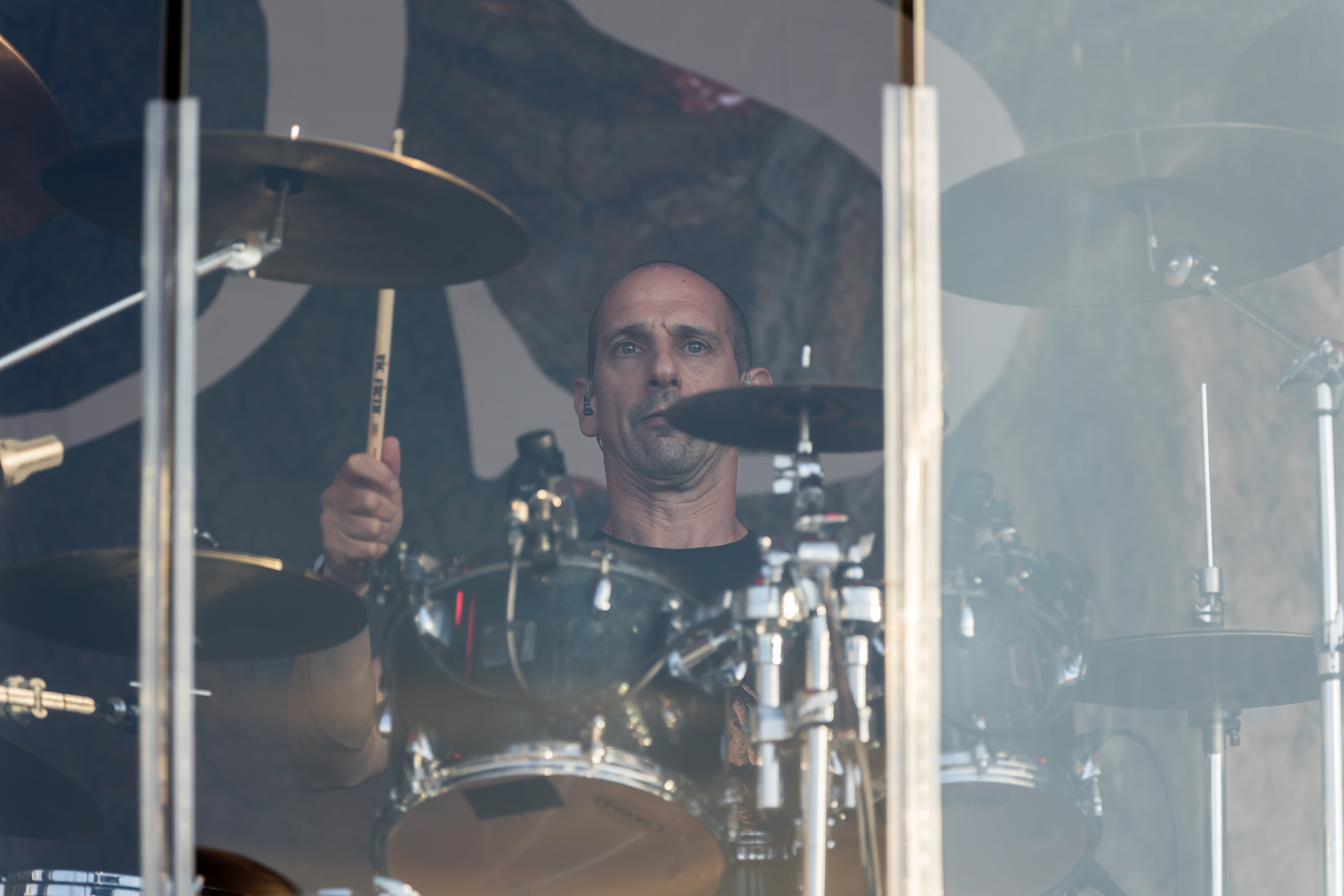
- Singer performing in 2026

Background information
- Born: 31 March 1971 (age 55); Manchester, England
- Occupation: Drummer
- Member of: Kill II This, Paradise Lost
- Formerly of: Blaze Bayley, China Beach, City of God, My Dying Bride, Soldierfield

Jeff Singer (born 31 March 1971) is a British drummer who is a member of the metal bands Kill II This and Paradise Lost. He formerly played in the bands My Dying Bride (2018–2022), Soldierfield (2012–2016), China Beach (1992–1994), Blaze (1999–2003), City of God (2004–2006).

== Career ==
Singer auditioned to be in Paradise Lost in 1994 after Matthew Archer quit, but was not chosen – because of having a pink drum kit. In 2004, when Paradise Lost's drummer Lee Morris (the drummer who beat Singer in the Audition for the spot in the band in '94) quit, Singer was finally chosen to be in the band, which was conflicting for him as he was to be the drummer for another British Metal band Rise To Addiction, but committed to Paradise Lost just in time to play on the band's Forever After single, as the band were about to record it. Singer was not officially hired into the band until Paradise Lost's single The Enemy in 2007. Singer announced his departure from the band on 13 August 2008, just before a scheduled South American tour, because he wanted to be with his family and had an upcoming job. As a result, Paradise Lost had to cancel the South American tour dates they had planned, though they have since hired a new drummer, Adrian Erlandsson (At the Gates, Cradle of Filth), and reconfirmed the tour. There had been a few times that Singer filled in for Erlandsson on occasional Paradise Lost shows, when Erlandsson was unable to play for the band. Singer rejoined Paradise Lost in May 2025 after a near 17-year absence, marking the first time a former drummer had rejoined the band.

== Discography ==
Album / Song		Year
Six Bullet Russian Roulette	China Beach	1994
Silicon Messiah	Blaze	2000
Tenth Dimension	Blaze	2002
As Live as It Gets	Blaze	2003
Forever After	Paradise Lost	2005
All You Leave Behind	Paradise Lost	2005
Paradise Lost	Paradise Lost	2005
The Enemy	Paradise Lost	2007
In Requiem	Paradise Lost	2007
Over the Madness	Paradise Lost	2007
The Anatomy of Melancholy	Paradise Lost	2008
Lost in Time (10–11)	Paradise Lost	2012
Tragic Illusion 25 (9–12)	Paradise Lost	2013
Catharsis	Soldierfield	2014
The Ghost of Orion	My Dying Bride	2020
