= The Man Who Would Not Die (album) =

Studio album by Blaze Bayley
- Released: 7 July 2008
- Genre: Heavy metal
- Length: 62:31
- Label: Blaze Bayley Records
- Producer: Blaze Bayley

Blaze Bayley chronology
| Blood and Belief (2004) | The Man Who Would Not Die (2008) | Promise and Terror (2010) |

Professional ratings
Review scores
| Source | Rating |
|---|---|
| Sputnikmusic | 4/5 stars |
| Metal-Temple.com | 4/5 stars |

The Man Who Would Not Die is the fourth studio album by English heavy metal band Blaze Bayley, released in 2008. It is the first studio album released by the band since they changed their name from "Blaze" and the first with the completely new band line-up other than Blaze Bayley himself. The track "Robot" was released as the band's first single, and later a video was made for it.

The influence of the other band members can be heard more on The Man Who Would Not Die than previous Blaze Bayley albums, as they contributed more to the song themes and music. In an interview with the band, Bermudez stated that the track "Serpent Hearted Man" had very little writing from Bayley, and that in general the band worked more closely together than before.

== Track listing ==
1. "The Man Who Would Not Die" – 4:35
2. "Blackmailer" – 4:43
3. "Smile Back at Death" – 7:38
4. "While You Were Gone" – 5:27
5. "Samurai" – 5:39
6. "Crack in the System" – 5:53
7. "Robot" – 3:10
8. "At the End of the Day" – 3:39
9. "Waiting for My Life to Begin" – 5:10
10. "Voices from the Past" – 5:55
11. "The Truth Is One" – 4:22
12. "Serpent Hearted Man" – 6:15

== Personnel ==
- Blaze Bayley – vocals
- Nico Bermudez – lead guitar
- Jay Walsh – rhythm guitar
- David Bermudez – bass
- Lawrence Paterson – drums
