= Blood & Belief =

Studio album by Blaze
- Released: 26 April 2004
- Recorded: Late 2003 – early 2004
- Genre: Heavy metal
- Length: 51:27
- Label: SPV/Steamhammer
- Producer: Andy Sneap

Blaze chronology
As Live as It Gets (2003)	Blood & Belief (2004)	Alive in Poland (2007)

Professional ratings
Review scores
Source	Rating
The Metal Crypt	4/5 stars

Blood & Belief is the third studio album by English heavy metal band Blaze Bayley, then known as Blaze, released in 2004. It is the first album that did not have the complete original line-up, as Jeff Singer and Rob Naylor left just after the recording of the band's first live album, As Live as It Gets.

The album contains more emotional themes than the previous two Blaze albums, which dealt more with science fiction themes. A promotional video of the track "Hollow Head" was made, but no singles were released from the album. After touring for the album, the entire band left except for Bayley, leaving him to start from scratch.

== Track listing ==
No.	Title	Writer(s)	Length
1.	"Alive"	Bayley, Slater, Wray	4:09
2.	"Ten Seconds"	Bayley, Slater, Wray	4:29
3.	"Blood and Belief"	Bayley, Slater, Wray	6:32
4.	"Life and Death"	Bayley, Slater, Wray	5:11
5.	"Tearing Yourself to Pieces"	Bayley, Slater, Wray	5:47
6.	"Hollow Head"	Bayley, Slater, Wray, Banks	4:01
7.	"Will to Win"	Bayley, Slater, Wray	4:53
8.	"Regret"	Bayley, Slater, Wray	5:52
9.	"The Path & the Way"	Bayley, Slater, Wray	4:53
10.	"Soundtrack of My Life"	Bayley, Slater	5:34
11.	"Fear of the Dark" (feat. Doro; live)	Steve Harris	6:31

== Personnel ==
- Blaze Bayley – vocals
- Steve Wray – guitar
- John Slater – guitar
- Wayne Banks – bass
- Jason Bowld – drums
