= Blaze Bayley =

English singer (born 1963)

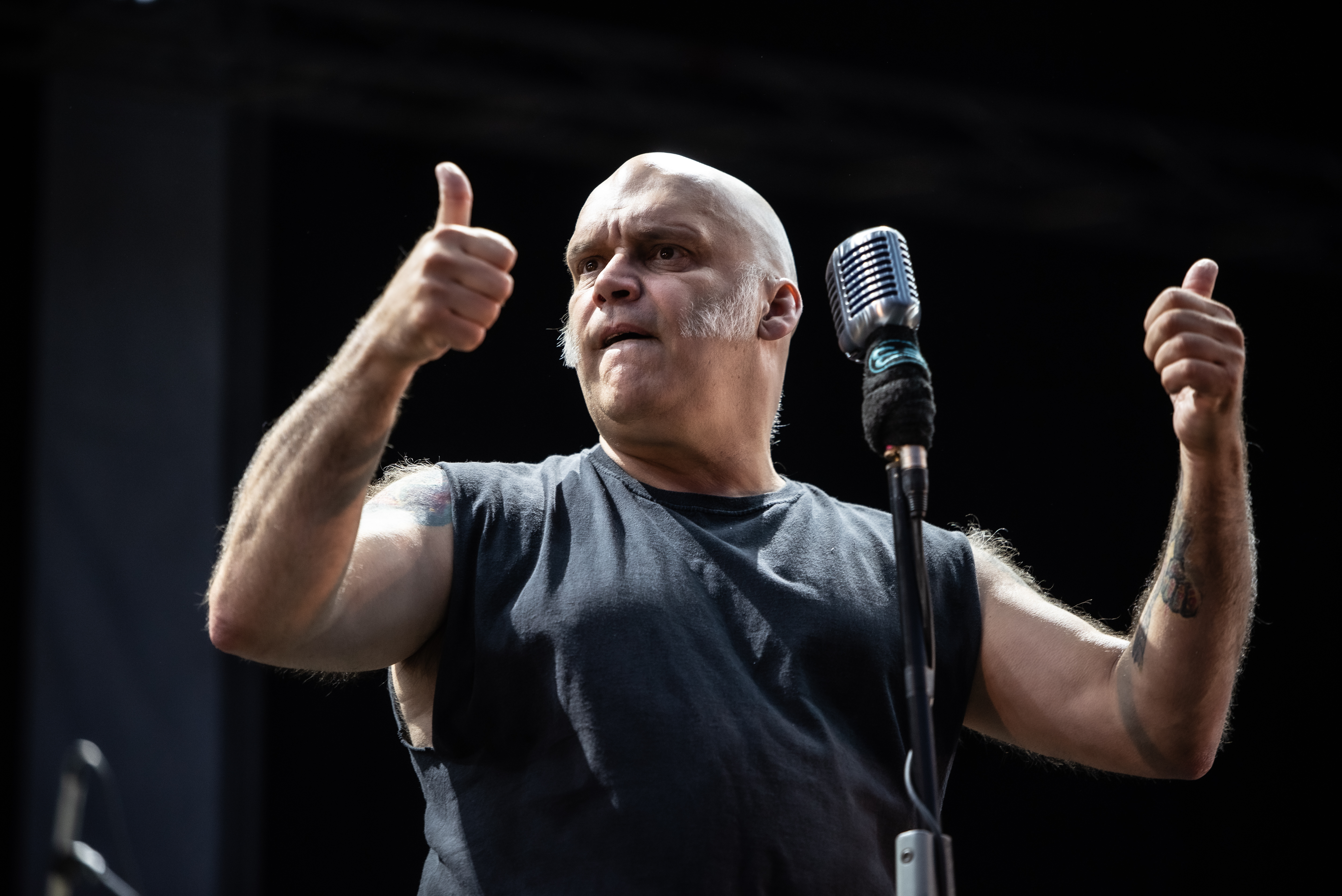
- Bayley performing in 2024

Background information
- Born: Bayley Alexander Cooke; 29 May 1963 (age 63); Birmingham, England
- Genres: Heavy metal; hard rock
- Occupations: Singer; songwriter
- Years active: 1984–present
- Label: Blaze Bayley Recording
- Member of: Wolfsbane
- Formerly of: Iron Maiden
- Spouse: Debbie Hartland (m. 2007; died 2008)
- Partner(s): Kate Ross (2021–present; engaged)
- Members: List of solo band members
- Website: blazebayley.net

Blaze Bayley (born Bayley Alexander Cooke, 29 May 1963) is an English singer. He was the lead singer of Wolfsbane from 1984 to 1994 (and currently since 2010, following reunions in 2007 and 2009). He was also the lead singer of Iron Maiden from 1994 to 1999. Since then, he has pursued a solo career and has released eleven studio albums. Blaze was voted number 67 in Sweden Rock magazine's top 100 singers of all time.

== Early life ==
Bayley was born Bayley Alexander Cooke in Birmingham on 29 May 1963. His main inspiration to be a singer was when he saw Ronnie James Dio perform live at Birmingham Odeon on Dio's "Holy Diver" tour. At the time, Bayley was working a night job as a hotel porter. He would watch the rehearsals of a sixth form band who played Sex Pistols covers and some original material. It was the first time Blaze decided he would like to be a singer on stage.

== Career ==
=== Wolfsbane (1984–1994, 2007–present) ===
Bayley started his career as the lead vocalist of Wolfsbane, a band formed in 1984. Their debut album, Live Fast, Die Fast, was released in 1989.

Before that, Wolfsbane had recorded three demos - Wolfsbane (1985), Dancin' Dirty (1987), and Wasted but Dangerous (1988). Notably, the latter was recorded at Square Dance Studios in Derby, England. In 1990, they supported Iron Maiden on their No Prayer on the Road tour in the UK. During the same year, Wolfsbane released an EP titled All Hell's Breaking Loose Down at Little Kathy Wilson's Place. Their second full studio album, Down Fall the Good Guys, followed in 1991, granting them their sole UK chart entry with the single "Ezy" peaking at No. 68.

Despite being dropped by Def American due to insufficient sales, Wolfsbane was voted the UK's best unsigned act in 1993. That same year, they released a live album, Massive Noise Injection, through the Bronze Company label. In 1994, the band unveiled their self-titled third studio album, Wolfsbane, also on the Bronze Company label. A limited edition of the album included the EP Everything Else. After Bruce Dickinson's departure from Iron Maiden in 1993, Bayley was chosen as his replacement. Wolfsbane disbanded shortly after.

In 2007, Wolfsbane regrouped for a special one-off performance, with Bayley resuming vocal and frontman duties. They provided support for The Wildhearts on a brief UK tour in December 2007. Another tour followed in December 2009, this time supporting The Quireboys on their 'A Little Bit of What You Fancy 20th Anniversary Tour' . Notably, Wolfsbane headlined a show at the Borderline in London on 9 April 2011. Subsequently, they embarked on a tour supporting Saxon in April 2011. In 2011, Wolfsbane released the album Wolfsbane Save the World, along with an EP titled Did it for the Money, complemented by a successful UK tour.

=== Iron Maiden (1994–1999) ===
Bayley was chosen as Bruce Dickinson's replacement after hundreds of auditions. His departure from Wolfsbane led to their disbandment later that year. After a serious motorcycle accident put him out of commission for a year, Bayley was able to record vocals for Maiden's The X Factor, released in 1995. Bayley went on tour with the band in support of the album. Another Iron Maiden album with Bayley on vocals, entitled Virtual XI, was released in 1998.

The two Iron Maiden albums released during Bayley's tenure did not chart as well as the band had hoped. The X Factor peaked at No. 8 on the UK Albums Chart and Virtual XI hit only No. 16, both being the lowest-charting Iron Maiden studio albums since Killers was released in 1981.

In 1999, Bayley was dismissed from Iron Maiden during a band meeting, after suffering from difficulties with his voice due to extensive touring and performing songs outside his vocal range. After the return of Bruce Dickinson, Iron Maiden occasionally perform songs from the two Maiden albums featuring Bayley, including "Man on the Edge" and "Futureal", which he co-wrote, though no Bayley-era songs appeared in the band's set list between 2005 and 2017. In 2018, the band played "The Clansman" and "Sign of the Cross". Likewise, Bayley has performed Iron Maiden songs originally recorded by the Dickinson and Paul Di'Anno led line-ups at some concerts.

=== Solo career (1999–present) ===
==== BLAZE / Blaze Bayley (1999–2007) ====
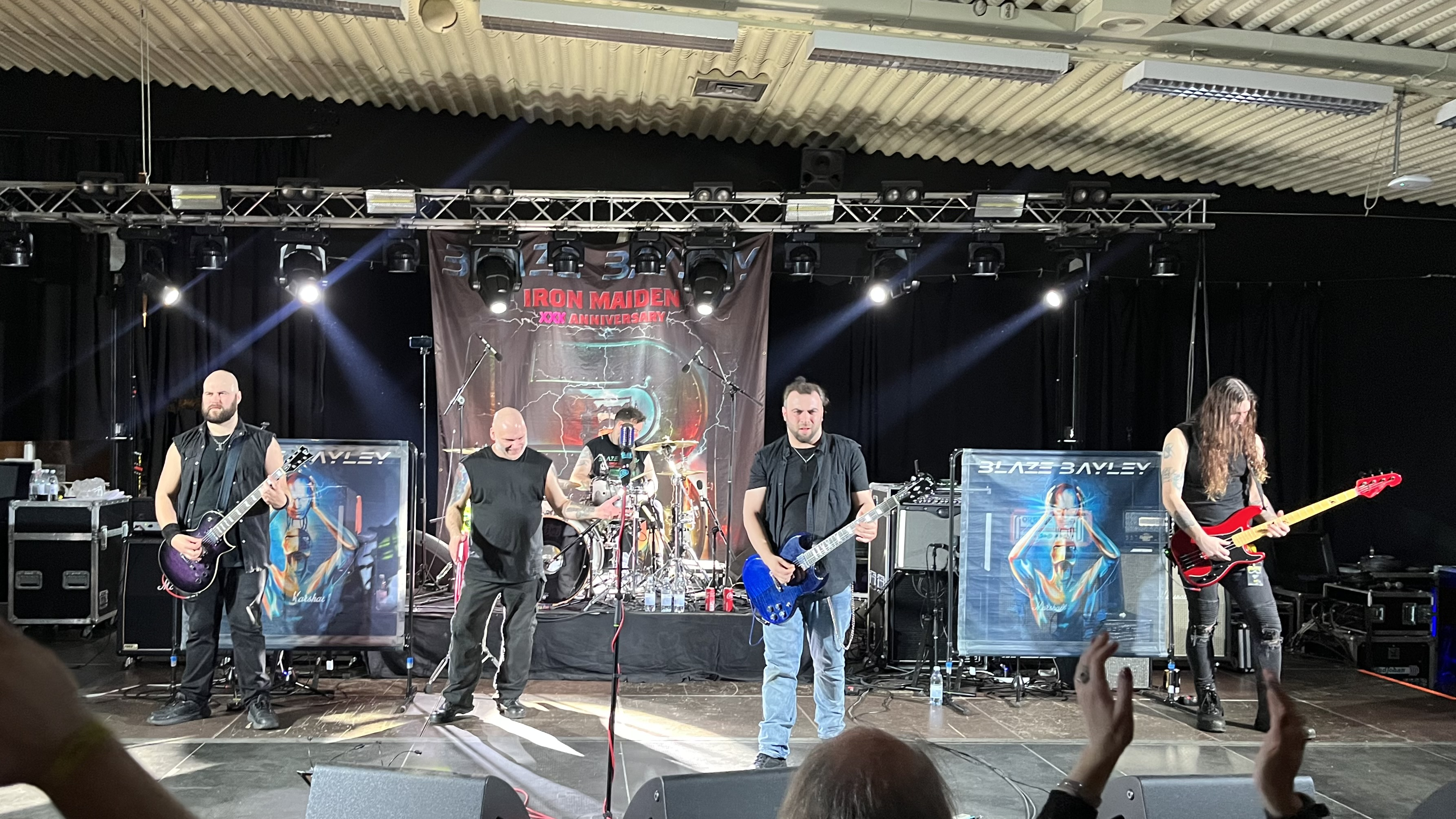
Bayley and his band performing in 2024

Following Bayley's departure from Iron Maiden in 1999, he began a solo career when he formed his own band, "BLAZE", in March that year. Bayley recruited guitarist Steve Wray, guitarist John Slater, bassist Rob Naylor and drummer Jeff Singer, and signed a deal with German label SPV, releasing his debut studio album Silicon Messiah in 2000. The album was followed up by Tenth Dimension in 2002 and the band's first live album in 2003, As Live as It Gets. All those albums had positive reviews, but financial problems and some issues with the record company soon led to changes in the band.

After recording the live album, Jeff Singer announced he was leaving. Three months later, Rob Naylor was also leaving. Session drummer Phil Greenhouse and bassist Wayne Banks were hired for the rest of the Tenth Dimension tour until permanent replacements could be found. Guitarist Jason Banks was drafted in for a few gigs at the end of 2003 to cover for John Slater.

At the end of 2003, Blaze began writing material for their third studio album, Blood & Belief. Phil Greenhouse was replaced on drums by Jason Bowld for recording and Dave Knight for touring. The band began to tour for the album shortly after it was released in 2004, but were set back again by the news that John Slater could not perform a large section of the tour. Despite rejoining the band later in the year, Slater eventually left the band in September with Steve Wray to form the band Rise to Addiction. Bassist Wayne Banks and drummer Dave Knight left the band to join the Robin Gibb band in September 2004.

Blaze performed a number of shows in 2004 and 2005 with the line-up of Bayley, guitarist Oliver Palotai, guitarist Luca Princiotta, bassist Nick Douglas, and drummer Daniel Löble. The two guitarists were eventually kept on as full members. The band's line-up shifted once again when Löble quit to join German power metal band Helloween early in 2005 and when Douglas returned to another German heavy metal band, Doro. The two were replaced by unknown German musicians Daniel Schild and Christian Ammann respectively. With the new line-up, Blaze began to work on a fourth studio album for a release in 2007, but in January that year it was announced the entire line-up had to separate from Bayley due to serious financial matters. Following the line-up change, Bayley opted to rename the band under his name, Blaze Bayley.

==== Blaze Bayley (2007–onwards) ====
In February 2007, Blaze Bayley Band (also known as BBB) added guitarists Nicolas Bermudez and Rich Newport, bassist Dave Bermudez, and drummer Rico Banderra and recorded the live DVD album Alive in Poland, released later that year. Bayley announced that Rich Newport had left the band to pursue a "career" as a guitar teacher later on that year, and Jay Walsh would replace him onstage for the remainder of the tour. Jay was made a full member of the band in November 2007. Bayley also announced the addition of drummer Lawrence Paterson, formerly of British metal bands Chokehold and Shadowkeep at the same time.

In July 2008, Blaze Bayley Band (BBB) released their debut studio album, The Man Who Would Not Die. The album also contained the band's first single, "Robot", despite only being available digitally. It is sometimes regarded as a mini-compilation as it includes many bonus tracks. In September Debbie Hartland, Blaze's wife and manager of the band, died of a stroke after some weeks of recovery. The singer and the band, although distraught by the loss, bravely continued to perform in honour of her love and committed work. The band recorded another DVD live at Z7, The Night That Will Not Die, which was released in March 2009. Blaze Bayley announced that the band had started recording for their new album on 28 September 2009. A contest was run on the band's forum: the first two people who correctly guessed the title of the new album would receive a free signed copy. The title was revealed to be Promise and Terror a few days later.

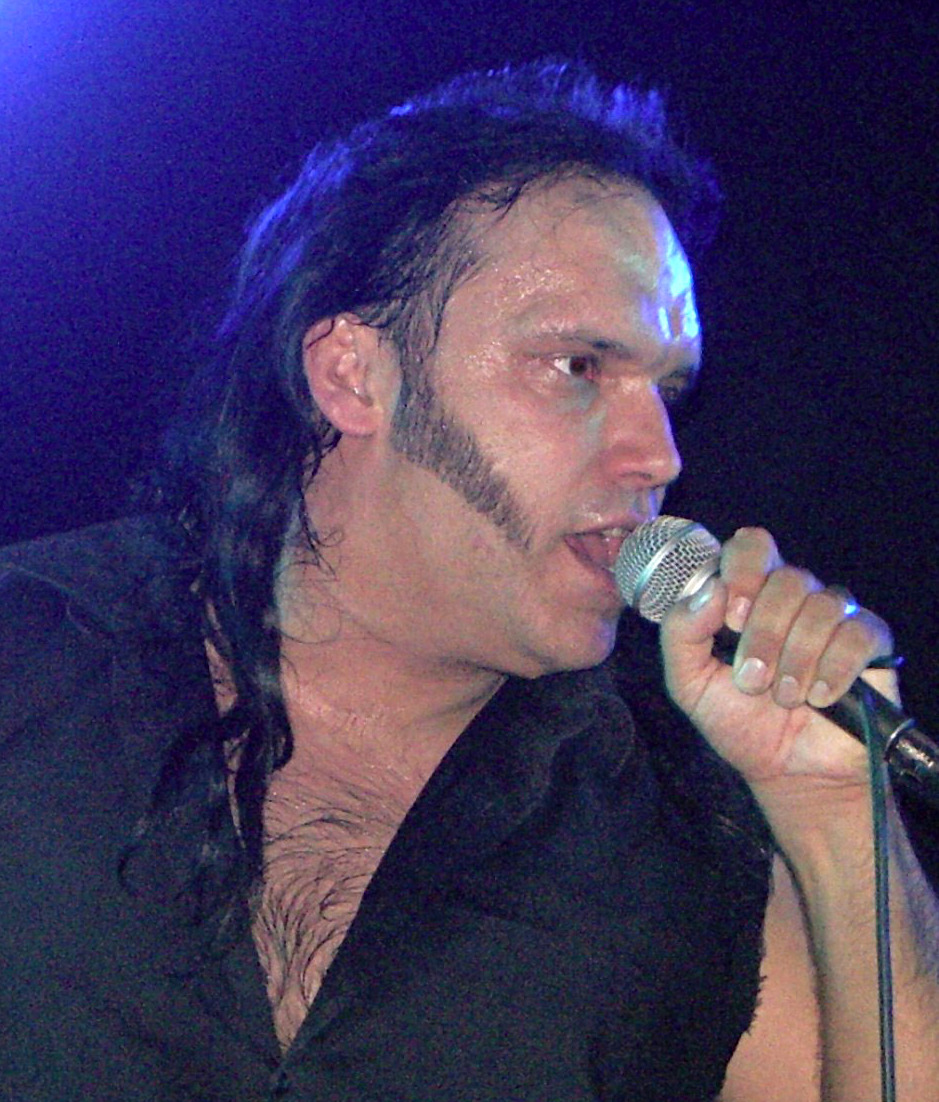
Bayley performing in 2007

The second album Promise and Terror was released on 1 February 2010. Professional reviews were generally very positive. The album was produced by Jason Edwards.

In February 2010, BBB started their 2010 world tour in Dudley, UK. They spent the next months playing the UK, France, Italy, Germany before leaving for the South American leg of the tour. They then returned to Europe later in the year.

In May 2010, drummer Lawrence Paterson left the band due to unspecified personal and professional reasons. Paterson was also the author of the book At The End of the Day, a biography of the Blaze Bayley Band. Also their manager, Anna, announced her departure from the band. She claimed that the band's idea of where to go next and hers were not in the same direction.

Following the departure of Paterson the Blaze Bayley Band engaged Italian drummer Claudio Tirincanti to continue the Promise and Terror tour. On 10 July 2010 Blaze Blayley claimed live on stage that his current album was his best-selling as a solo-artist shedding some light on the recent changes in his line-up and management.

The BBB embarked on a short European tour in early 2011 and were supposed to follow that up in May 2011 with more dates in the UK. But surprisingly, on 29 March via his official channels, Blaze Bayley stated that he had to part ways with the band due to both health and financial reasons. Later emerged that a great problem has been the fact that the Bermudez brothers had to frequently buy flights back home to Colombia to renew their visas. The matter was heavy not only from the financial and bureaucratic point of view, but also musically: the BBB had often to find last minute substitutes, in the likes of Luke and Chris Appleton from the band Fury UK or Dave Andrews who would later join the band.

On 31 March 2011, Blaze announced that he would continue as a solo performer working with different musicians.

Alongside the reunion and new recordings of Wolfsbane, Bayley played a two-week acoustic solo tour in the UK in September 2011 with fellow Wolfsbane guitarist Jase Edwards plus a few unplugged gigs in Italy with Andrea Neri on guitar. Footage of the acoustic shows with Jase Edwards can be seen on the Official Blaze Bayley YouTube Page.

In 2011, Blaze presents the first new song with the renewed line-up, called "Black Country". In February 2012 Bayley toured Russia with Paul Di'Anno, starting a partnership between the two ex-Iron Maiden singers who hit the road as "Blaze VS Paul" and "Double Trouble Tour" in 2012 and 2013.

The singer hit the stages of some summer festivals and after that travelled to the US in October/November 2011 for his first full US headline tour since his days with Iron Maiden, supported by North-American musicians of the Canadian band Man the Destroyer plus American guitarist/producer Rick Plester, of international fame, who worked with Bayley in the future.

On 26 December 2011, in a personal Christmas message on his website Blaze announced that his new album The King of Metal would be released on 8 March 2012. On the same day, Blaze officially announced the first two legs of the King of Metal world tour on the official Blaze Bayley Facebook page. The King of Metal album was recorded between Italy and the Netherlands, mixed by Tony Newton at Steve Harris home studio, Rick Plester in the US and Raoul Soentken in the Netherlands.

New line-up consists of three Italians (the confirmed drummer Claudio Tirincanti, bassist Lehmann, guitarist Andrea Neri) and Dutch youngster Thomas Zwijsen, a talented classic guitarist who became a cult-musician on YouTube for his acoustic arrangements of Iron Maiden's classics. Zwijsen co-wrote most of the music of the new Bayley album. The same line-up recorded the album and backed Bayley in the King of Metal European Tour, playing more than 60 gigs.

The busy schedule of 2012 also saw an acoustic tour with Zwijsen (July), some appearances with Czech band Seven, a few gigs with Wolfsbane (October), a second co-headlining tour with Paul Di'Anno in Eastern Europe, Australia and New Zealand (November), and the successful "unplugged" tour that also touched Brazil and Europe, with Zwijsen on classical guitar and Dutch violinist Anne Bakker.

In 2013, the intense acoustic experience became an official release in the catalogue of Bayley: in partnership with Thomas Zwijsen, he released an EP (Russian Holiday) of classically arranged tunes, working with Yellowdog Creative Project Management for the release. The artwork of the album was created by Akirant.es.

Bayley then hit the US for a special tour with an all-star band named The Foundry, with guitarist Rick Plester (Black Symphony), bass player John Moyer (Adrenaline Mob, Disturbed, Queensrÿche) and Scorpions drummer James Kottak, plus vocalist Shawn Austin. Later in the year, Bayley reached Canada for some acoustic gigs and then toured again with Di'Anno in Finland, Russia and Ukraine.

===== Partnership with Absolva =====
Bayley announced Soundtracks of My Life, a double-CD best of, as a tribute to his 30th anniversary as a singer, released in November 2013, and followed by an extensive world tour the following year. The album presented two new tracks, "Hatred" and "Eating Children", written and performed by Blaze Bayley and Rick Plester. For both songs, two promotional video clips were shot.

After a first leg of the tour in South America, Bayley presented the new live band for European gigs. They were musicians of the Manchester-based band Absolva: Chris Appleton (guitars, already seen live with Bayley), Dan Bate (bass, then temporarily replaced by Luke Appleton, brother of Chris and member of Iced Earth, and then again new Absolva permanent bass player Karl Schramm) and Martin McNee (drums).

With the Absolva line-up, Blaze recorded the DVD Live in Prague which contained a full show of the Soundtracks of My Life European tour plus bonuses. In Slovakia and Germany, with other musicians, Bayley then celebrated his 20th anniversary of joining Iron Maiden with a small tour with an exclusive set focused on songs of his period in the band. Then, Bayley hit Canada and US, the latter again under the moniker The Foundry with Plester, Moyer and Twisted Sister's drummer A.J. Pero and occasionally Bobby Jarzombek behind the kit. In 2015, he toured South America under the moniker "Metal Singers" together with vocalists Udo Dirkschneider, Ripper Owens and Mike Vescera.

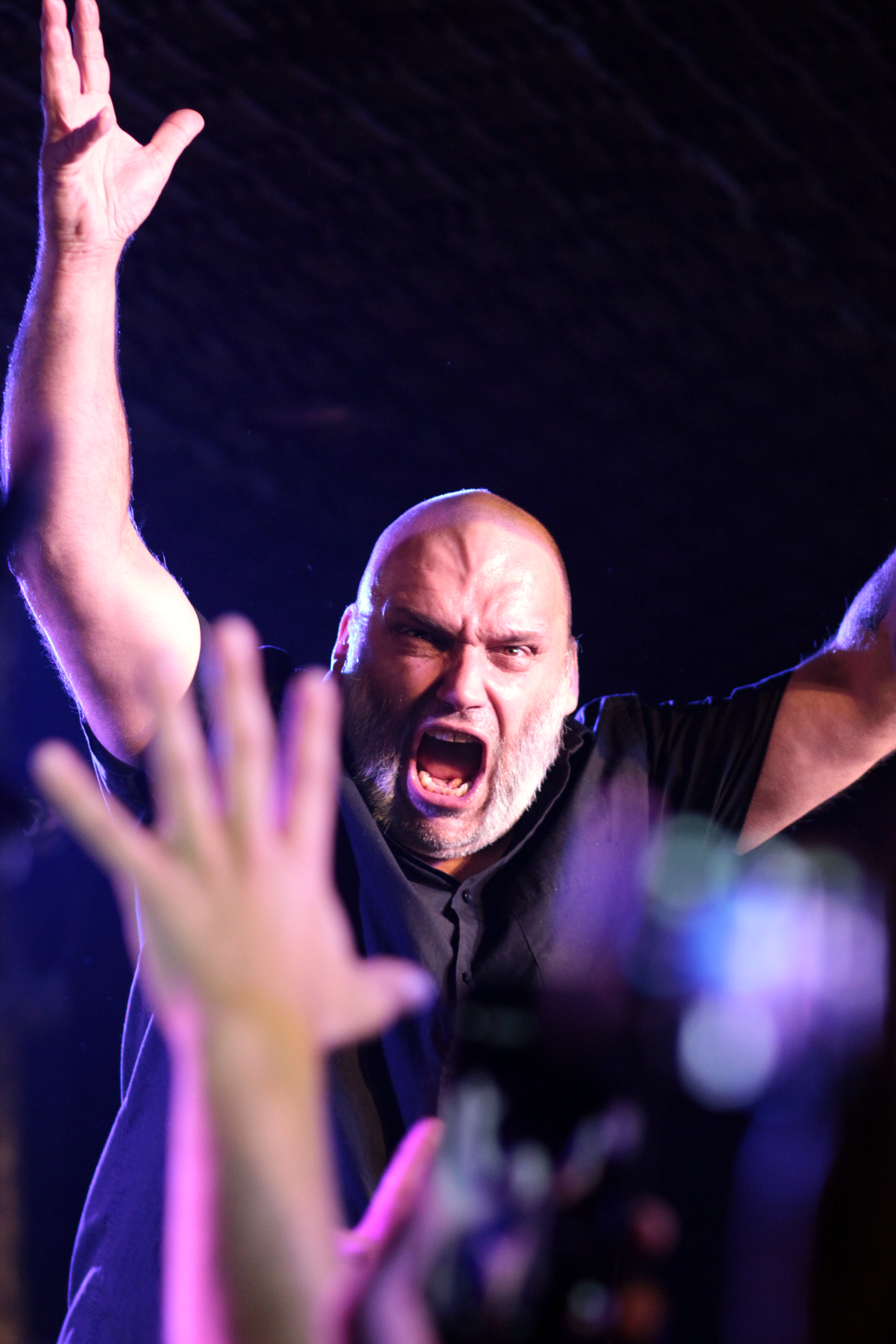
Bayley in 2016

In March 2016, with new management – Mark Appleton (of independent record label Rocksector Records) – a new album Infinite Entanglement was released, followed by an extensive European tour with the Absolva line-up. The new album was a concept inspired by sci-fi themes like Blaze's early solo releases Silicon Messiah and Tenth Dimension. Infinite Entanglement was written and recorded by Bayley and the musicians from Absolva, as well as writing contributor Michelle Sciarrotta. The record also featured backing vocal contributions from Luke Appleton of Iced Earth, Jo Robinson and Mel Adams of Aonia and Liz Owen, nylon acoustic guitar from Thomas Zwijsen, violin from Anne Bakker, as well as voice actors Bayley himself, Aine Brewer, Rob Toogood and Michelle Sciarrotta. The European touring for 2016 was completed by a performance at Huskvarna Rock & Art festival in Sweden. During 2016, Bayley also toured Latin America and Canada with different musicians, followed by North America with Geoff Tate and Tim "Ripper" Owens under the band name Trinity, a short-lived collaboration organised by Tate's management.

In June 2016, Bayley was onstage as guest vocalist with Disturbed at Download Festival in England, performing The Who's "Baba O'Riley".

Endure and Survive, the second album in the Infinite Entanglement trilogy, was released in March 2017, co-written between Bayley, Chris Appleton and Michelle Sciarrotta. The album continued the sci-fi story and again featured the same backing vocal/choir contributions as its predecessor, plus instrumental contributions from Thomas Zwijsen on nylon acoustic guitar and Anne Bakker on violin, as well as Uli Jon Roth's keyboard player Corvin Bahn who played accordion. The voice actors also returned to help continue the story. The official video for promotional singles of the album, "Escape Velocity" was filmed at Iron Maiden lead singer Bruce Dickinson's aircraft maintenance business and flight simulator, Cardiff Aviation Ltd.

The concluding part of the trilogy, The Redemption of William Black, was released in March 2018, co-written predominantly by the Bayley/Appleton partnership.

During these years, the touring and recording band was cemented from the ranks of Absolva – Chris Appleton (guitar and backing vocals), Martin McNee (drums), Karl Schramm (bass and backing vocals). World tours have accompanied each full metal release.

In November 2018, a second classical acoustic album December Wind was released featuring guest guitarist Thomas Zwijsen.

In March 2019, a double live album and DVD, Live in France, was released, as recorded at the famous Chez Paulette venue near Nancy, France.

The 25th anniversary of Blaze Bayley joining Iron Maiden was marked in 2019. To help celebrate this milestone, a series of festival appearances occurred featuring a setlist selected exclusively from his two studio albums with Iron Maiden – X-Factor and Virtual XI. For these performances, Luke Appleton of Iced Earth was drafted in as second guitarist. The most prominent of these performances was at Sweden Rock Festival and Rock the Coast (Spain).

In April 2020, a double live album and DVD, Live in Czech, was released, as recorded at the venue Melodka in Brno, Czech Republic.

===== Recent events =====
On 15 December 2020, it was announced on Blaze Bayley's website and social media that pre-order had started for Blaze's new studio album War Within Me. This was the first full-length Blaze Bayley full metal studio album outside the Infinite Entanglement trilogy for almost ten years. Bayley has continued to work with the British heavy metal musicians from Absolva. The album was released digitally on 9 April 2021 and soon after the physical version was released. On February 23, 2024 a new album was announced: Circle Of Stone, anticipated by digital singles Rage, the title track and Mind Reader. Circle of Stone released on February 23, 2024.

On April 2, 2025, Blaze announced he would be releasing a 25th anniversary vinyl edition of Silicon Messiah, accompanied by a European tour throughout 2025 and later extended into 2026.

== Blaze Bayley musicians ==
Current band:

- Blaze Bayley – vocals (1999–present)
- Chris Appleton – guitar (2009, 2014-present)
- Luke Appleton – bass (2009, 2025–present) rhythm and lead guitar (2013–2014, 2018–2019, 2021–2025)
- Martin McNee – drums (2013–present)
- Tom Atkinson – guitar (2025-present)

Everyone in the current Blaze Bayley lineup are from the English heavy metal band; Absolva. (Apart from Blaze Bayley)

== Personal life ==
On 14 February 2007, Bayley married Debbie Hartland, his long-time girlfriend, on Gran Canaria. On 6 July 2008, Hartland suffered a cerebral haemorrhage and was hospitalised. She died on 27 September 2008 after having suffered a stroke two days before.

On 21 December 2022, Bayley got engaged to his girlfriend Kate Ross at Stonehenge on the Winter Solstice.

On 25 March 2023, Bayley suffered a heart attack.

Among personal interests Bayley rides his Triumph Bonneville motorcycle, plays darts and is a supporter of Aston Villia F.C.

== Discography ==
With Wolfsbane

- Live Fast, Die Fast (1989)
- Down Fall the Good Guys (1991)
- Wolfsbane (1994)
- Wolfsbane Save the World (2012)
- Genius (2022)
- Live Faster... [Re-recording of "Live Fast, Die Fast"] (2025)

With Iron Maiden

- The X Factor (1995)
- Virtual XI (1998)

As Blaze

- Silicon Messiah (2000)
- Tenth Dimension (2002)
- Blood & Belief (2004)

As Blaze Bayley

- The Man Who Would Not Die (2008)
- Promise and Terror (2010)
- The King of Metal (2012)
- Infinite Entanglement (2016)
- Endure and Survive – Infinite Entanglement Part II (2017)
- The Redemption of William Black – Infinite Entanglement Part III (2018)
- War Within Me (2021)
- Circle of Stone (2024)

Live albums

- As Live as It Gets (2003)
- Alive in Poland (2007)
- The Night That Would Not Die (2009)
- Live in Prague (DVD release only) (2014)
- Live in France (2019)
- Live in Czech (2020)
- Damaged Strange Different and Live (2023)

Audio/video samples

- "Sign of the Cross" – Blaze Bayley singing on the opening track from Iron Maiden's The X Factor album
- Wasted Years with Doro
- Heaven Hell Sabbath Cover Dio era
- Wrathchild Maiden Live in studio
- The Evil That Men Do The Eternal Flame
- The Number of the Beast VXI Tour bootleg
- Wasted Years and The Trooper Acoustic
- Man on the Edge and Fear of the Dark played with the band Trooper
- Blaze Bayley Human Official Video

== Concert tours ==
With Wolfsbane

- Live Fast Die Fast Tour (1989)
- No Prayer on the Road (1990) (Wolfsbane performed as the support act for Iron Maiden during the UK leg.

With Iron Maiden

- The X Factour (1995–1996)
- Virtual XI World Tour (1998)

As Blaze

- Silicon Messiah Tour 2000/2001 (2000–2001)
- Tenth Dimension Tour (2002)
- As Live As It Gets Tour (2003)
- Blood & Belief Tour 2004/2005 (2004–2005)
- The Christmas Tour (2005)

As Blaze Bayley

- The Confusion Fusion Tour 2007 (2007)
- My Life in Acoustic (2007)
- Headbanging Bastards Tour (2008)
- The Tour That Will Not Die (2009)
- Promise and Terror Tour (2010–2011)
- The Incredible Acoustic Tour (2011)
- King of Metal Tour (2012)
- Soundtracks Of My Life World Tour (2014)
- Silicon Messiah 15th Anniversary Tour (2015)
- Infinite Entanglement 2016 Tour (2016)
- Endure and Survive Tour (2017)
- The Redemption Of William Black World Tour (2018)
- Tour of the Eagle Spirit (2019)
- Iron Maiden 25th Anniversary Tour (2019–2020)
- ~~Tenth Dimension 2020 Tour~~ (2020) (Cancelled due to the COVID-19 Pandemic)
- The War Within Me Tour (2021)
- The Unstoppable Tour (2022–2023)
- Iron Maiden 30th Anniversary Tour / Circle of Stone Tour (2024)
- Silicon Messiah 25th Anniversary Tour (2025)
- The X factor 30th anniversary tour (2025)

As Blaze Bayley and Thomas Zwijsen

- Acoustic European Tour (2012)
- The King of Resistance Tour (2013)
- Russian Holiday Acoustic Tour (2013)
- Soundtrack of My Life European Tour (2014)
- Acoustic Tour '17 (2017)
- 100% Metal Tour (2018–2019)
- December Wind Acoustic Tour (2018)

As Blaze Bayley and Paul Di'Anno

- The Double Trouble Tour (2012–2013)

As The Foundry

- U.S.A. Tour '13 (2013)
- Metal Classics Tour (2014)
- The Foundry North America Tour '15 (2015)

As Blaze Bayley and Michelle Sciarotta

- Russian Holiday Acoustic Tour (2013)
- European Tour (2015)

As John Steel & Blaze Bayley

- Freedom Promo Tour (2014–2015)

As Metal Singers

- South America Tour '15 (2015)
- South America Tour '18 (2018)

As Trinity (Blaze Bayley, Geoff Tate and Tim 'Ripper' Owens)

- The Trinity Tour (2016)

== Accolades ==
In 2021, Blaze Bayley was inducted into The Metal Hall of Fame.

In 2026, he was inducted into the Rock and Roll Hall of Fame as a member of Iron Maiden. Commenting on the induction Bayley stated "It’s crazy, really!" "When I started out, I just wanted to be like Ronnie James Dio, and Dio is in the Heavy Metal Hall Of Fame and so am I. The Rock and Roll Hall Of Fame is another level entirely, it’s not really rock 'n' roll’ as we think of it it’s the music business hall of fame because it has everybody. So it’s absolutely wild."
