= State of Mind (Psycho Motel album) =

Studio album by Psycho Motel
- Released: Dec 16 1995
- Studio: Element Studios, Hull and AIR Studios, London
- Genre: Progressive rock, hard rock
- Length: 54:33
- Label: Raw Power/Castle (UK); Sanctuary (US); Victor (Japan)
- Producer: Adrian Smith

Psycho Motel chronology
State of Mind (1995)	Welcome to the World (1997)

Professional ratings
Review scores
Source	Rating
AllMusic	3/5 stars
Collector's Guide to Heavy Metal	6/10

State of Mind is the 1995 debut album from the British progressive rock band Psycho Motel, formed by Iron Maiden guitarist Adrian Smith. The album featured Hans-Olav Solli on vocals, subsequently of Scott Gorham's 21 Guns. The album features a heavy guitar-driven sound.

The album was released only in Japan in 1995 and re-released in Europe in 1996. The European release had only 10 tracks and different artwork, which featured a negative image of the Japanese version cover. The album was re-released again in 2006, with the European version of the artwork. No singles were released from the album, but there was a promotional video made for song "Psycho Motel".

An unreleased track called "Demolition" was played live during the few gigs Psycho Motel did as a support act for Iron Maiden on The X-Factor in 1996. This song was recorded during the sessions of State of Mind and, according to an interview with Adrian Smith in 1996, the band did not like how it sounded so it was dropped and then re-worked before its live debut.

== Track listing ==
1. "Sins of Your Father" (Adrian Smith) – 4:45
2. "World's on Fire" (Smith) – 4:12
3. "Psycho Motel" (Smith) – 4:54
4. "Western Shore" (Smith, Hans-Olav Solli) – 4:46
5. "Rage" (Smith, Solli, Jimmy Lagnefors) – 3:13
6. "Killing Time" (Smith) – 4:46
7. "Time Is a Hunter" (Smith) – 5:31
8. "Money to Burn" (Smith, Lagnefors) – 4:07
9. "City of Light" (Smith) – 4:22
10. "Excuse Me" (Smith, Solli, Lagnefors) – 5:17
11. "Last Goodbye" (Smith) – 4:03 (Only on the Japan Pressing)
12. "(Can't) Wait" (Smith, Solli) – 4:37 (Only on the Japan Pressing)

== Personnel ==
Psycho Motel

- Hans-Olav Solli – vocals
- Adrian Smith – guitar, producer
- Gary Leideman – bass guitar
- Mike Sturgis – drums

Additional musicians

- The Bates Brothers – backing vocals
- Cynthia Fleming – violin on track 4
- Vincent Gérin – cello on tracks 3 and 4

Production

- Rupert Coulson – engineer, mixing
- John Etchells, Jody Sherry, Spencer May – engineer
- John Bailey, Tim Du Boisson – assistant engineers
- Ian Cooper, Tim Young – mastering at Metropolis Studios, London
