= Welcome to the World (album) =

Studio album by Psycho Motel
- Released: 24 November 1997
- Studio: Matrix Studios, London
- Genre: Hard rock; heavy metal; progressive rock
- Length: 65:47
- Label: Castle/Sanctuary
- Producer: Simon Hanhart

Psycho Motel chronology
State of Mind (1995)	Welcome to the World (1997)

Professional ratings
Review scores
Source	Rating
Collector's Guide to Heavy Metal	6/10

Welcome to the World is the second and final Psycho Motel album, released in 1997. It features a different vocalist from the band's first album, 1995's State of Mind. In place of Hans Olav Solli is Andy Makin, whose "dark lyrics and distinctive vocal delivery" differentiate the album from its predecessor. It also features Scott Gorham of Thin Lizzy and Dave Murray of Iron Maiden as guest guitarists.

In 2006, Welcome to the World was re-released with two bonus tracks. These tracks contain Solli from the first album on vocals, and were probably recorded just before he left the band in 1997.

The bonus track "Wait" is the same released in the Japanese version of State of Mind (1995) named "(Can't) Wait". There is a demo track called "Winter's Child" that was recorded during the Welcome to the World sessions but was never released.

== Track listing ==
No.	Title	Writer(s)	Length
1.	"The Last Chain"	Adrian Smith, Andy Makin	5:02
2.	"A Quarter to Heaven"	Smith, Makin	5:22
3.	"Rain"	Smith	4:29
4.	"Believe"	Smith, Makin	5:00
5.	"With You Again" (featuring Dave Murray)	Smith, Makin	4:28
6.	"Into the Black"	Smith, Makin	5:57
7.	"Underground"	Smith	5:19
8.	"Welcome to the World"	Smith	5:25
9.	"Something Real"	Smith, Makin	5:43
10.	"No Loss to Me"	Smith, Makin	4:41
11.	"Innocence"	Mike Sturgis	4:22
12.	"I'm Alive" (featuring Scott Gorham)	Smith, Makin	5:34
13.	"Hypocrisy"	Smith, Makin, Gary Liedeman	4:25
Total length:			65:47

2006 edition bonus tracks
No.	Title	Writer(s)	Length
14.	"Wait"	Smith	4:37
15.	"Just Like a Woman" (Bob Dylan cover)	Bob Dylan	5:21
Total length:			75:45

== Personnel ==
- Andy Makin – vocals
- Adrian Smith – guitar, backing vocals
- Gary Liedeman – bass guitar
- Mike Sturgis – drums
- (Hans Olav) Solli – vocals on "Wait" and "Just Like a Woman"

Additional musicians

- Dave Murray – guitars on "With You Again"
- Scott Gorham – guitars on "I'm Alive"
- Richard Cottle – keyboards
- Martin Ditcham – percussion

Production

- Simon Hanhart – producer, engineer, mixing
- Ray Staff – mastering at Whitfield Street Studios, London
- Tom Girling – assistant engineer

Other

- Phil Nicholls – photography
