= Urchin (band) =

English hard rock band

- Also known as: Evil Ways
- Origin: England
- Genre: Hard rock
- Years active: 1972–1980
- Label: DJM Records
- Past members: Adrian Smith; John Hoye; Dave Murray; Maurice Coyne; Barry Tyler; David Hall; Alan Levett; Andy Barnett; Richard Young

Urchin (also known as Evil Ways) were an English hard rock band.

== Early years ==
The band was formed in 1972 by childhood friends Dave Murray and Adrian Smith. Along with bassist John Hoye and various drummers, they entered a few local talent competitions and played their first gigs in Hoye's school.

Early in 1974 Murray decided to leave and join a 'proper' band and Smith and Hoye met up with guitarist Maurice Coyne who was a friend of a friend. After a jam session in Hoye's school hall, they decided to form a band and Evil Ways was reborn. A drummer Barry Tyler then joined the band. After gigging around local pubs they decided that they needed a singer/frontman, and recruited Dubliner David Hall.

By this time Evil Ways were playing regularly at most of the well known London venues. In August 1976 they were signed by Nomis/Morgan (owned by Simon Napier-Bell) who changed the band's name to Urchin, and got them a recording contract with DJM Records. Their first single was going to be "Without Love", written by Dave Hall, with "Rocka Rolla" (the Judas Priest song) as the B-side. They were recorded in a studio in Denmark Street, London but were never released. Soon after, Hoye left the band in 1977 and was replaced by Alan Levett (an old school friend of Tyler's).

== Line-up changes ==
"Black Leather Fantasy", was released on 13 May 1977 and is now a very rare collector's item. Hall left the band in July 1977, followed by Coyne in January 1978. Coyne was replaced, briefly, by Dave Murray who had left Iron Maiden after an argument. Murray decided not to stay and after playing on the recording of the band's second single – "She's a Roller" (originally called "I'm a Roller")/ "Long Time No Woman" – he returned to Iron Maiden. Urchin carried on and recruited guitarist Andy Barnett, later a member of Visage and FM, and later keyboard player Richard (Dick) Young. However, the advent of punk rock led to the loss of their recording contract and meant that live work was drying up as their brand of hard rock was no longer fashionable. Eventually the band broke up and in early 1980 Smith and Barnett formed The Broadway Brats with ex members of Blazer Blazer. Later that year Smith was invited to replace guitarist Dennis Stratton in Iron Maiden.

== Reunions ==
On 19 December 1985 Smith organised a reunion of his mates and performed the live recording The Entire Population of Hackney at the Marquee Club in London along with Nicko McBrain. Later in this recording, the rest of his bandmates from Iron Maiden appeared on stage. In 1989, Smith got some of his Urchin bandmates, including Barnett, and some friends together to form his separate project, ASAP (Adrian Smith and Project). They recorded two singles, "Silver and Gold" and "Down the Wire" and one album, Silver and Gold. They did not tour and split after Smith left Iron Maiden in 1990.

In 1992, Smith once again got together some of the ASAP bandmates to form the band The Untouchables, which lasted until 1994 when he decided to rename the band and hire a lead singer. This was called Psycho Motel.

In 2004, High Roller Records released a limited and hand-numbered 330 copies on silver vinyl album, Urchin, including four single tracks, one live recording and five unreleased songs. In 2010, High Roller Records released a full-length album called High Roller, first released on a limited number of 1500 copies, 300 black vinyl with white border, 400 white vinyl and 800 black vinyl with a 20 pages booklet, and later in 2011, was released a CD version with a 24 pages booklet and a limited number of 1000 copies.

There are unofficial live albums, recorded on K7 tapes and currently distributed on the internet.

== Discography ==
=== Singles ===
- "Black Leather Fantasy" (1977)
1. "Black Leather Fantasy"
2. "Rock 'n' Roll Woman"
- "She's a Roller" (1978)
1. "She's a Roller"
2. "Long Time No Woman"

=== Albums ===
- Urchin (2004)
1. "She's a Roller"
2. "Long Time No Woman"
3. "Black Leather Fantasy"
4. "Rock & Roll Woman"
5. "See Me Through" (Live '85 by The Entire Population)
6. "See Me Through"
7. "Walking Out on You"
8. "Somedays"
9. "Watch Me Walk Away"
10. "The Latest Show"
11. "Lifetime"
- Urchin – High Roller (2010)
1. "Keeping It Mellow"
2. "Life in the City"
3. "Watch Me Walk Away"
4. "Countdown"
5. "Lifetime"
6. "The Late Show"
7. "My Lady"
8. "Animals"
- Urchin – Get Up and Get Out (2012)
1. "Madman"
2. "Need Somebody"
3. "Get Up and Get Out"
4. "Little Girl"
5. "Countdown" (Alternate Version)
6. "Lifetime"
7. "Don't Ask Me"
8. "Suicide"

=== Unofficial live albums ===
- Urchin Radio 1 BBC Session 1979 – (Wrongly Titled: BBC Friday Rock Show (1977))
1. "See Me Through"
2. "Walking Out on You"
3. "Some Days (I Only Want to Rock'n Roll)"
4. "Watch Me Walk Away"
5. "The Latest Show"
6. "Lifetime"
- Urchin – Live in Oxford (1980)
1. "Life in the City"
2. "Countdown"
3. "Walking Out on You"
4. "Little Girl"
5. "Steal My Heart"
6. "The User"
7. "Ain't Got No Money"
8. "30 Days in the Hole"
9. "Music"
10. "Somebody Like You"
11. "Rocky Mountain way"
12. "Lifetime"
13. "Animals"
14. "Statesboro Blues"
15. "Watch Me Walk Away"
16. "See Me Through"

== Members ==
=== Last known line-up ===
- Adrian Smith – guitar (1974–1980), vocals (1977–1980)
- Andy Barnett – guitar (1978–1980)
- Richard Young – keyboards (1979–1980)
- Alan Levett – bass guitar (1976–1980)
- Barry Tyler – drums (1974–1980)

=== Former members ===
- Maurice Coyne – guitar (1974–1978)
- David Hall – vocals (1975–1977)
- John Hoye – bass (1974–1976)
- Dave Murray – guitar (1977–1978)

== See also ==
- List of new wave of British heavy metal bands
