= Psycho Motel =

British hard rock band

- Origin: England
- Genres: Heavy metal, hard rock
- Years active: 1995–1999
- Label: Sanctuary
- Past members: Adrian Smith; Andy Makin; Gary Leideman; Mike Sturgis; (Hans Olav) Solli

Psycho Motel were a British hard rock band, formed in 1995 by Iron Maiden guitarist Adrian Smith. The band released two albums.

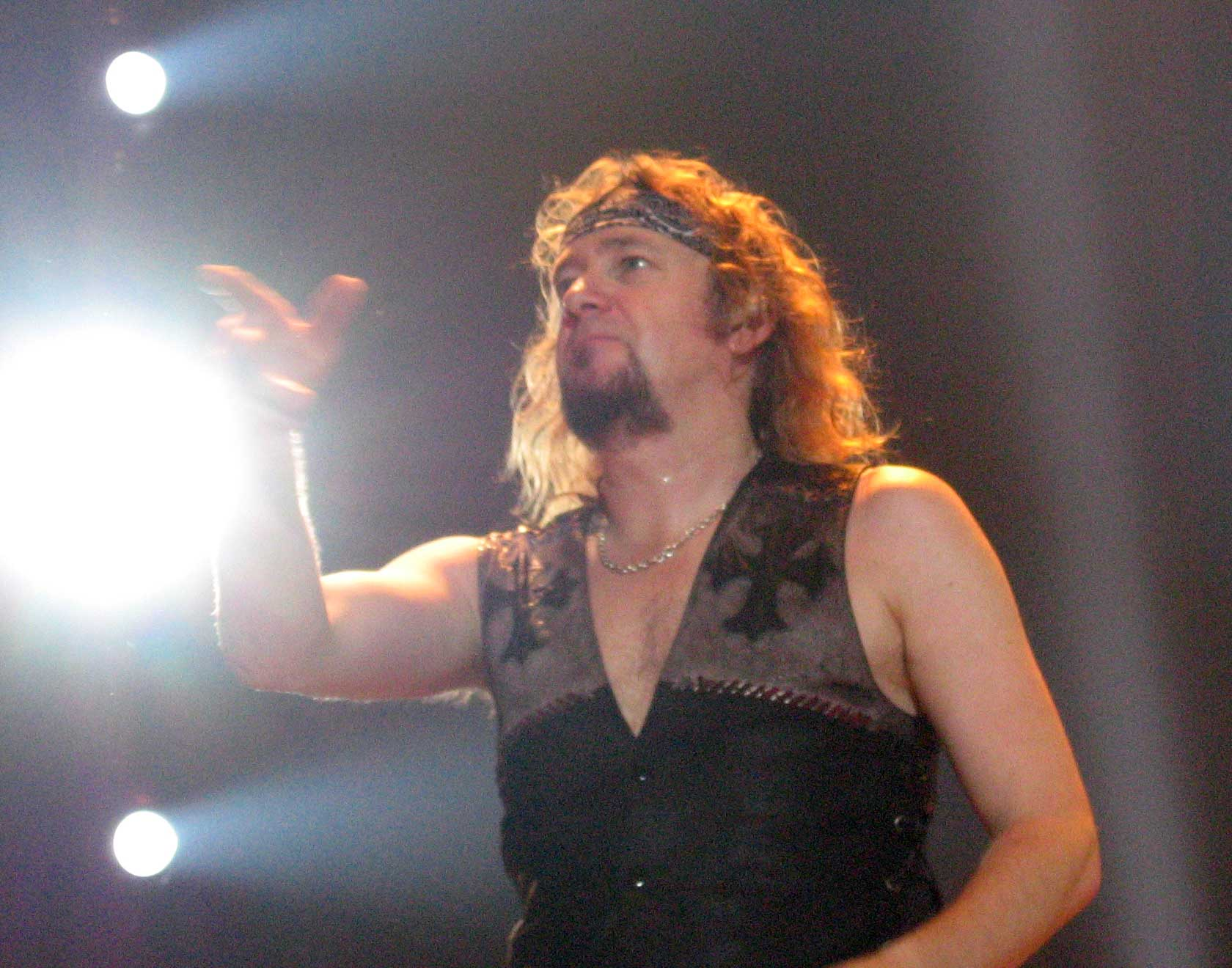
Adrian Smith

== History ==
The band was formed in 1995 by Iron Maiden guitarist Adrian Smith after he left Maiden in 1990. Smith briefly experimented with a project called ASAP (Adrian Smith and Project) before seemingly retiring from the music industry altogether in 1990. However, it was a chance meeting with Jamie Stewart, formerly bass guitarist with The Cult and Carl Dufresne that finally persuaded Smith back into the spotlight.

We became friends, and decided to form a little band called The Untouchables, just for fun. He didn't want to get back in the music business full time, and neither did I - to be honest I'd had enough of it. We started off playing just little clubs for fun and it snowballed from there. We played everywhere around Britain. But the one thing that I didn't want to do was to find myself committed to recording and touring, just like the old days.

Quote from Adrian Smith, as quoted from the State of Mind cover.

However, Stewart soon quit the project and was replaced by bassist Gary Leideman. In 1993, The Untouchables (featuring Smith on vocals, Carl Dufresne, Gary Leideman and Fabio DelRio). Dufresne and DelRio soon left the band and Smith decided to extend the line-up by bringing in singer Solli, a Norwegian formerly of Sons of Angels, who had been working with Thin Lizzy guitarist Scott Gorham in 21 Guns. A demo impressed enough for the band to land a recording deal. They changed their name to Psycho Motel and debuted with the album State of Mind in 1995, followed by Welcome to the World in 1997, which featured new singer Andy Makin.

As far as Smith was concerned, the two records were distinct from each other:

"They're quite different, because there are different singers on them. The first album we had a Norwegian guy called Solli who used to be with a band named 21 Guns. We did tour in Europe but he couldn't continue with us, because he had some personal stuff to take care of. He got divorced plus he lived in Norway, which is kind of difficult. So we had to find another singer. Then I found Andy, a young guy, 26 years old and we did the second album with him. He brought a more modern influence to the band. I was sort of doing a retro thing with my Hendrix and Zeppelin influences. On the first album with Solli, there was a more of a Robert Plant type vocal. The second album is more modern, because Andy was into Alice in Chains and Soundgarden so it made for a great blend. I really like the second album, although I've played the first album a couple of times and realized it's just as good."

Quote from Adrian Smith, as quoted from the Welcome to the World album cover.

After the release of Welcome To The World, Smith went to help on two albums and two tours with Bruce Dickinson. After this, they both re-joined Iron Maiden in 1999, and Psycho Motel split up. When asked if he would consider re-forming the band in 2001, he said that they had "no plans at the moment" but they would "possibly do some stuff next year". This has yet to happen with his continued success with Iron Maiden.

In 2006, both albums were re-released, Welcome to the World was released with two bonus tracks, "Wait" and "Just Like A Woman".

On an interview in 1996 Adrian confirmed Psycho Motel was formerly known as "Skeleton Crew". The band was a trio and Adrian was doing all the vocals. Shortly after the drummer quit, Solli was recruited along with Mike Sturgis. The name Psycho Motel came from a previous demo.

In an interview with eonmusic in 2025, Adrian said that he regretted not touring with the 1997 version of the band.

== Personnel ==
- Andy Makin - Lead vocals
- Adrian Smith - Guitars, backing vocals
- Gary Leideman - Bass
- Mike Sturgis - Drums
- (Hans Olav) Solli - Vocals (State of Mind)
- Jamie Stewart - Bass in The Untouchables
- Carl Dufresne- Guitars, Keys, vocals in The Untouchables
- Huwey Lucas - Guitars in The Untouchables
- Bob Richards - Drums in The Untouchables
- Fabio Del Rio - Drums in The Untouchables

== Discography ==
=== Studio albums ===
- State of Mind (1995)
- Welcome to the World (1997)
