= Maurice Coyne =

British hard rock guitarist

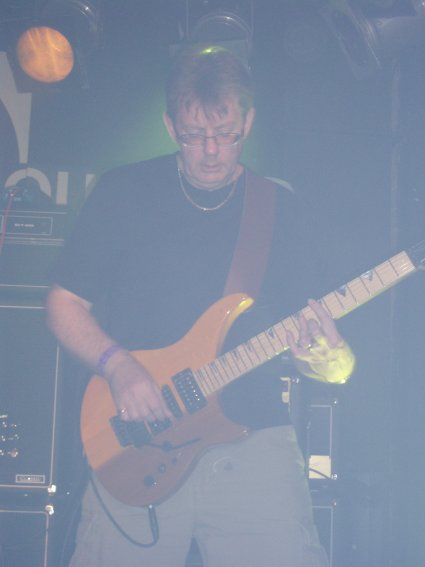

Background information
- Born: 21 March 1955 (age 70); City of London, London, England
- Genres: Heavy metal, progressive rock, hard rock
- Instrument: Guitar
- Years active: 1971–present
- Labels: High Roller Records

Maurice Coyne (born 21 March 1955 in London) is a British hard rock guitarist.

He attended Colvestone Primary School in Dalston, and Upton House Secondary School in Hackney. In 1974 he formed the band Evil Ways with Adrian Smith, John Hoye and Barry Tyler. In 1975 they were joined by singer David Hall. In 1976 the band changed their name to Urchin and were signed to DJM Records. They released their first single, "Black Leather Fantasy" in 1977. Coyne left the band for personal reasons in January 1978. He was replaced, briefly, by Dave Murray who overlapped with Coyne for a couple of months - (while Murray rehearsed and recorded, Coyne covered live gigs). Murray played on the band's second single, "She's A Roller", before rejoining Iron Maiden in early 1978.

In 1980, Coyne joined Berlyn and was later joined by the former Urchin bassist Alan Levett. Berlyn split in March 1983, following which Coyne took a break from the music industry for a few years. Berlyn had two albums of live and demo material released by the German label, High Roller Records.

In recent years Coyne has played in several rock cover bands, most notably Rewind (which also featured Trevor Walker and Cliff Massey from Berlyn), Pinnacle of Decline and Full Metal Jacket. He is currently lead guitarist with Leeds-based, hard rock cover band Meanstreak.
