= Salute (21 Guns album) =

Studio album by 21 Guns
- Released: July 13, 1992
- Studio: Image (Los Angeles); Landlord (Los Angeles); A&M (Hollywood); One on One (Los Angeles)
- Genre: Hard rock
- Length: 50:49
- Label: RCA
- Producer: Chris Lord-Alge

21 Guns chronology
Salute (1992)	Nothing's Real (1997)

Singles from Salute
- 1. "Knee Deep" Released: 1992

Professional ratings
Review scores
Source	Rating
AllMusic	4.5/5 stars
Daily Press	2/4 stars
RockEyez	4.5/5 stars

Salute is the debut studio album by American rock band 21 Guns, released on July 13, 1992, through RCA Records. Artwork on the album was directed by Hugh Syme.

The song "Just a Wish" was later covered by Far Corporation, again with Scott Gorham on guitar.

== Critical reception ==
AllMusic gave the album 4.5 out of 5 stars, albeit without leaving a review or distinguishing any tracks as standouts.

Mark Balogh of RockEyez gave the album 4 out of 5 stars. Balogh's review focused on the 2013 rerelease and remastering of the album through Rock Candy Records. Balogh positively compared 21 Guns' sound to "the best and classiest moments of Danger Danger or even Ted Poley's solo projects mixed with some other AOR greats like Giant and Alias." Balogh singled out "Knee Deep," "Little Sister," "Jungleland," and "Just a Wish" as the album's highlights.

Billboard magazine gave the album a positive review, singling out the "catchy leadoff track 'Knee Deep'" but conceding that the band "treads familiar turf lyrically and musically" and has little in common with Gorham's "venerable roots" in Thin Lizzy. The Daily Press gave the album 2 out of 4 stars, a "fair" reception, while parroting the text of Billboard's review.

== Track listing ==
All tracks are written by Scott Gorham and Leif Johansen, except where noted.

No.	Title	Writer(s)	Length
1.	"Knee Deep"	Gorham, Johansen, Thomas La Verdi	4:06
2.	"These Eyes"	Gorham, Johansen, Mike Sturgis	4:17
3.	"Walking"	Gorham, Johansen, La Verdi	3:46
4.	"Marching in Time"		4:06
5.	"The Rain"		4:30
6.	"Little Sister"		4:14
7.	"Pays Off Big"		4:10
8.	"Just a Wish"		3:13
9.	"Battered and Bruised"		3:12
10.	"Jungleland"		4:25
11.	"Tell Me"		4:26
12.	"No Way Out"		4:28

== Personnel ==
Band members

- Thomas La Verdi – vocals
- Scott Gorham – guitars, backing vocals, arrangements
- Leif Johansen – bass, keyboards, backing vocals, arrangements
- Mike Sturgis – drums

Additional musicians

- Kim Bullard – piano

Production

- Chris Lord-Alge – producer, engineer, mixing
- Mike Douglas, Eric Greedy, Richard Landers, Jason Roberts, Talley Sherwood – assistant engineers
- Ria Lewerke – creative director
- Bob Ludwig – mastering
- Hugh Syme – art direction
