= Jackson Dinky =

Electric guitar built by Jackson Guitars

- Manufacturer: Jackson Guitars
- Period: 1986-present

Construction
- Body type: Solid
- Neck joint: Bolt-on

Woods
- Body: Alder, Basswood
- Neck: Maple
- Fretboard: Ebony, Rosewood, Maple

Hardware
- Bridge: Locking tremolo, Fixed String-Thru
- Pickup(s): H-H, H-S-S, H-S-H

Colors available
- White, Black, Transparent Red, Transparent Blue, Transparent Black, Silverburst

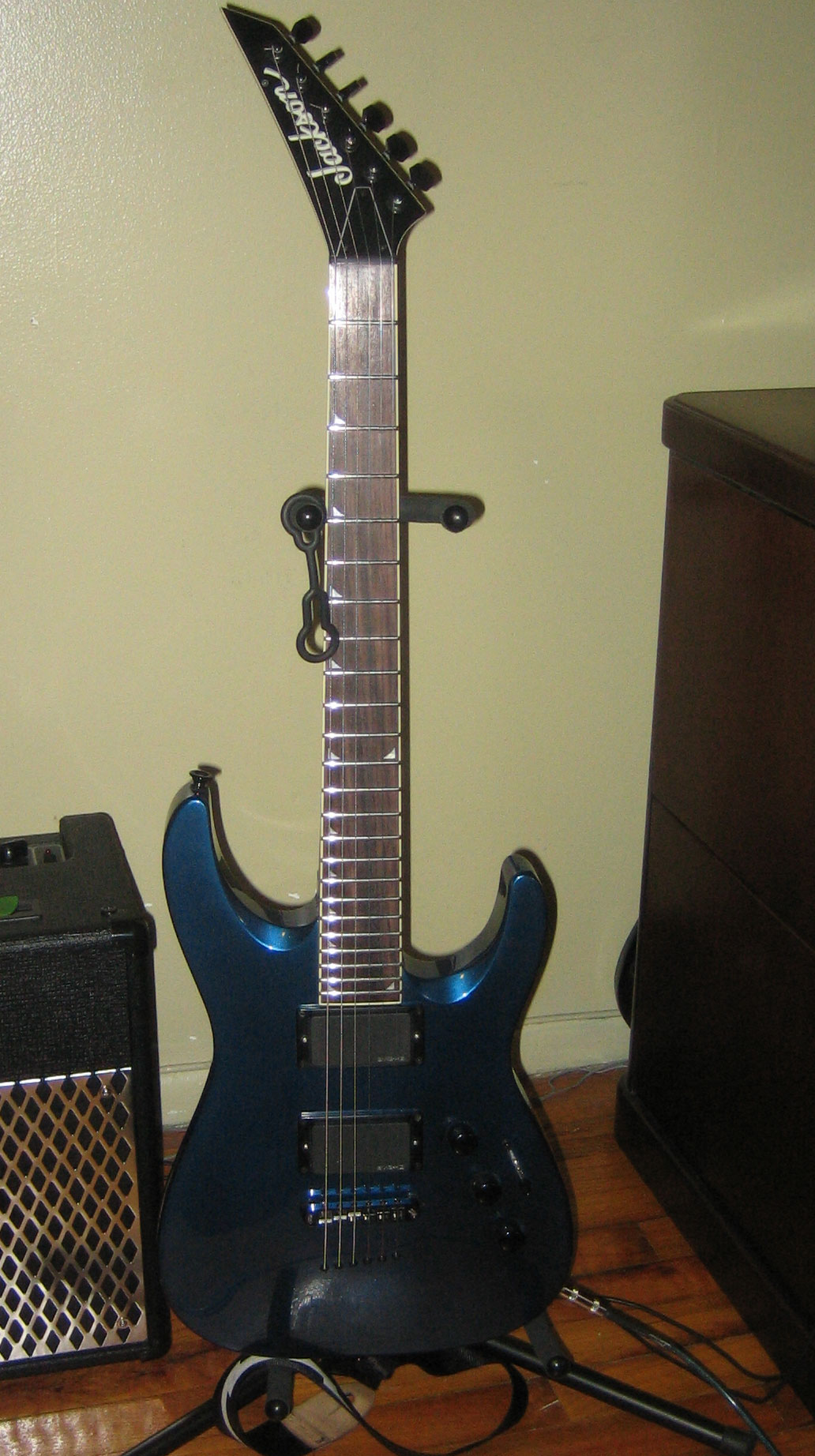
A dark blue Jackson Dinky with a Reverse Headstock and Tune-O-Matic style fixed bridge (as opposed to the far more common Floyd Rose tremolo system), 2005

The Jackson Dinky is a Superstrat-style double-cutaway electric guitar built by Jackson Guitars. The "Dinky" is named for its slightly smaller than normal (7/8) body size. Usually fitted with a two humbucker pickup configuration, some models also include single-coil pickups and/or just one bridge humbucker. The fretboard can be made out of ebony, rosewood and more recently maple, or rock maple, with 24 jumbo frets and is always built with a bolt-on neck. Most of the guitars have a Floyd Rose original or licensed tremolo, and a locking nut to help maintain stable tuning. Some Dinkys have hardtail, or String-Thru bridges. The Jackson Dinky is usually preferred by players of hard rock and heavy metal.

== The models ==
The Dinky is the most common Jackson in production today with over 15 variants on the current market. These are below arranged in the series that they are given by Jackson Guitars.

=== USA Select series ===
There is only one Dinky in this series: the DK1. It has an Alder body and a maple bolt-on neck. The 24-fret fingerboard is ebony. The bridge is a Floyd Rose original double-locking two-point tremolo. This model has two Active humbucking pickups at the neck and bridge position, both of EMG make. This is the only current US-made Dinky, and is a production model made by Custom Shop luthiers. Retail price range is between $1,800–$2,400 USD depending on Paint Scheme.

=== Pro series ===
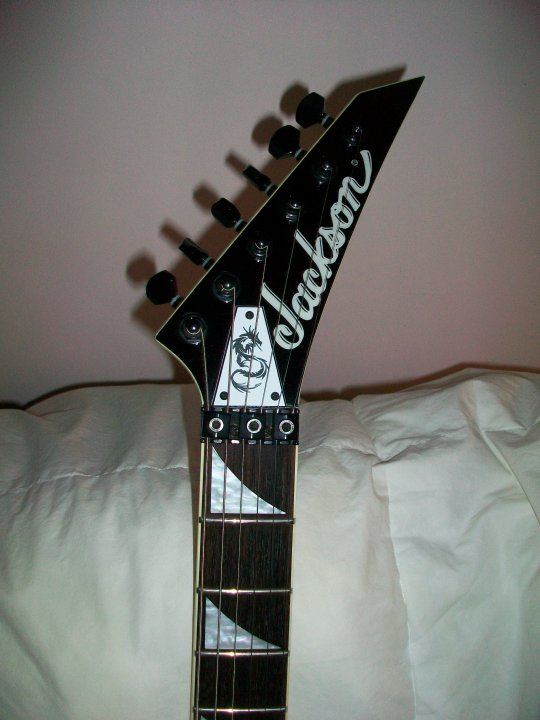
DK2 with the standard "Hockey Stick" 6-inline headstock & custom truss rod cover.

The Pro series has seven Dinkys, all variants of the base model: the DK2. The DK2s are made from alder with a maple bolt-on neck. The fingerboard is Rosewood with 24 frets. The DK2 model has three Seymour Duncan pickups; two are single-coil, the third (the bridge) is a humbucker. Variants include:

- DK2L: The left-handed version of the DK2
- DK2M: A DK2 with a maple fingerboard and unpainted maple headstock. This uses two humbuckers (authentic Seymour Duncan).
- DK2S: A DK2 with an alternative "Sustainiac Driver" neck pickup.
- DK2T: A string-through-body DK2 with adjustable Tune-O-Matic bridge, with two Seymour Duncan humbucker pickups.
- DK2FF: A DK2 with an abalone flame inlay on the neck.
- DK2FS: A DK2 with Firestorm Boost Switch for extra gain.
- DK3: Same specs as the DK2, except the pickup configuration is H/S/H. The guitar was only offered in 2000 and only appears in the 2000 Jackson catalog page 10 (https://www.jacksonguitars.com/support/archived-catalogs). It was listed in 2000 Guitar Player Price guide as having a list price of $949 which is $50 more than the regular DK2. Could very well be the only Jackson with H/S/H configuration and shark fin fret markers.
- DR3: Same as DK3 but with reverse headstock and reverse shark fin inlays and a pickup configuration of H/H.

=== Pro series Artist Signature ===
There are three Dinkys in this series and each of the Pro Series Artist Signature models puts an individual spin on the basic Dinky design.

- Christian Olde Wolbers Signature: A Dinky with a distinct camouflage graphic on both the body and headstock. The black ebony neck lacks inlays. This signature model comes with a single humbucker pickup.
- Christian Olde Wolbers Signature 7-string: This Dinky (offered in Camo, Red and Black finishes) matches the specs of the Christian Olde Wolbers Signature and adds a 7th string.
- Adrian Smith San Dimas Dinky: New for 2009, Iron Maiden guitarist Adrian Smith now has a signature Dinky. The Dinky comes with a San Dimas style headstock, and in two different designs. One design features an ebony fingerboard and a white pickguard. The second design comes with a maple fingerboard and a black pickguard. Both guitars feature a DiMarzio Super Distortion bridge humbucker, along with two Hot Samarium Strat pickups and a Floyd Rose double-locking Tremolo bridge.

=== MG series ===
The MG series features three Dinkys. The DKMG features an arch top Alder body. Flame Maple veneer tops on translucent colors are available on later models, and maple bolt-on neck with a reverse headstock. The 24-fret fingerboard is made from rosewood with Jackson's trademark Mother-Of-Pearl "Piranha Tooth" inlays and also features a bound neck. The earlier DKMG has two passive EMG-HZ humbuckers with an active boost control. The newer models consist of active EMGs 81 and 85. The DKMG has two variant models:

- DKMG : The DKMG with a licensed locking Floyd Rose bridge.
- DKMGT: The DKMGT with string-through-body, Tune-O-Matic style adjustable fixed bridge.
- DXMG: The DXMG with sharktooth inlays and licensed Floyd Rose bridge (most JT580LP).

A similar variant of this is the DXMG which had a non arched basswood body (as of 2006, previous years used alder) and alternative pickups (EMG-HZs) without the boost. But its DX designation makes it part of the X-Series, with neck/headstock binding and pickups differentiating it from a DX10D. Early model DXMGs were made in Japan, and made from alder, while later models (after 2006) were made in India and has basswood body. DXMGs are now discontinued.

=== X series ===
There is one Dinky model in the X series: The DKXT. The DKXT has an arch top basswood body with a bolt on maple neck. The rosewood fingerboard has 24 frets. The pickups are EMG; passive humbuckers. The DKXT features Through-Body Strings bridge.

=== Performer Series ===
The performer series were produced prior to the Fender takeover. This range includes the Jackson RR7, a seven-string Randy Rhoads design. Fully loaded having 3 pickups, one with reverse headstock (PS-4), 24 frets and floyd rose tremolos. PS-1, PS-2 and PS-4 have Alder solid body, and PS-3 has Poplar body (as seen at official catalogs). It is a great choice to get off the cheaper basswood guitars. All models have maple neck and rosewood fretboard. The Performer series were built early in Korea and later moved to Japan.

=== JS series ===
There are nine Dinkys in the entry level JS series

- JS1: Two humbucking pickups, both Jackson made. It has a fulcrum bridge. The body is made from Indian Cedro and the neck from maple.
- JS11: Two humbucking pickups, both Jackson made. It has a fulcrum bridge. The body is made from Indian Cedro and the neck from maple.
- JS12: Same as JS11 but with 24 frets (see video at 1min10sec).
- JS20: The JS20 has 22 frets and a normal headstock. The Jackson catalog from the early 2000s list the body as alder. The JS20 has two single coil pickups, one humbucker and a fulcrum bridge.
- JS22R: Two humbucking pickups, both Jackson made, a compound radius neck with 24 frets. It has a fulcrum bridge. The body is made from Indian Cedro and the neck from maple with a reversed headstock. The machine heads are made by JinHo (L1, L3, L4 models).
- JS22-7: A seven-string version of the JS Dinky, with two humbucking pickups, both Jackson made. It has a direct-mount hardtail bridge. The body is made from bass wood and has a bolt-on maple neck with a rosewood fingerboard and "3 on top, 4 on bottom" headstock. 26.5" scale length.
- JS23: The JS23 has a compound radius neck with 24 frets. It has a fulcrum bridge The JS23 has two single coil pickups and one humbucker.
- JS24: Solid mahogany body and a caramelized maple neck and fingerboard.
- JS30DK: The JS30DK follows the same specs as the JS1 but features "EMG style" Jackson CVR2 Sealed Humbucker Pickups, 22 frets instead of the Jackson standard of 24, and a Floyd Rose Licensed Jackson Low Profile JT580 LP Double Locking 2-Point Tremolo. (The JS 30DK is no longer in production).
- JS30DKT Hardtail: The JS30DKT Hardtail is a JS1 with an alternative pickup arrangement and an adjustable string-through-neck bridge. The pickup arrangement consists of two humbuckers, both Jackson made.
- JS32R: The JS32R has a compound radius neck with 24 frets. Floyd Rose Licensed Bridge, two Humbuckers by Jackson and a reversed headstock.
- JS32-7Q: The same as the JS22-7, but with a quilted maple top and in a natural finish.
- JS32-8 DKA: An eight-string model of the JS32-7 featuring the same basswood body, bolt-on maple neck, Satin Black color, and set of Jackson made humbuckers.
- JS32-8Q: An eight-string model of the JS32-7Q featuring the same basswood body, bolt-on maple neck, quilt top, and set of Jackson made humbuckers. Colors made were Transparent Red and Transparent Black.
- JS34-DKA: Arch-top poplar body with HSS pickup configuration. Also available in Quilt maple top with maple fretboard (JS34Q-DKAM)
