= ASAP (band) =

English rock band formed by Adrian Smith

A.S.a.P.
- Origin: England
- Genres: Hard rock, progressive rock
- Years active: 1989
- Label: EMI
- Members: Adrian Smith; Andy Barnett; Dave Colwell; Richard Young; Robin Clayton; Zak Starkey

A.S.a.P. were an English rock band formed by guitarist and vocalist Adrian Smith of Iron Maiden. A.S.a.P. released an album in 1989 entitled Silver and Gold. A.S.a.P. stands for "Adrian Smith and Project", and the full name of the band is incorporated within the band logo, with each word written in tiny font underneath the corresponding letter in the abbreviation.

== History ==
Adrian Smith formed the band in 1989 when Iron Maiden was taking a year break after spending almost a year on the road for the Seventh Son of a Seventh Son album tour in 1988. The band had its origin in Urchin, a band Smith fronted in the 1970s. Andy Barnett, Dave Colwell and Richard Young played with Smith in various incarnations of Urchin, which was disbanded in 1981 when Smith joined Iron Maiden.

Further foundations for the band were laid out in late 1985 when Iron Maiden were taking a break after their massive world tour in support of their album Powerslave. Bored with the lull in band's activity as they prepared to record a new album, Adrian Smith and Nicko McBrain started playing on their own to pass the time, and they soon formed a full band which included Colwell and Barnett. Along with some other musicians they knew, they went to play a one-off gig at London's Marquee Club in 1986, under the name of "The Entire Population of Hackney". At the show, the band performed mostly original material, including the songs "Silver and Gold" (which would later become the title track of their only album, "Fighting Man", "School Days" and "When She's Gone" (all of which would later be recorded by A.S.a.P. and released as B-sides to its singles) at the show, as well as three songs that would later be recorded by Iron Maiden ("Juanita", "Reach Out" and "That Girl").

When he formed A.S.a.P. in 1989, Adrian Smith invited his friends and former bandmates Colwell, Barnett and Young, as well as Zak Starkey, son of Beatles drummer Ringo Starr. Originally, Smith wanted Nicko McBrain to join on drums, but McBrain was getting married at the time and was unavailable for recording.

Their first and only album was a departure from the sound Smith helped create with Iron Maiden. It was not as heavy as Iron Maiden although there were elements of the more progressive sound the band had developed over the 1980s, but keyboards were more prominently featured than in Iron Maiden's music. It also featured Smith in the role of lead singer. His voice has a somewhat husky, working class feel to it comparable to Bryan Adams. The album was a commercial failure, despite the promotional tour and two singles, and the band soon ceased to exist.

In 1990, Adrian Smith left Iron Maiden during the writing of their album No Prayer for the Dying, due largely to creative differences with Steve Harris. Despite staying on good terms with the band, the departure from Iron Maiden led Smith to a decision to quit the music business altogether, and between 1990 and 1993 he performed live only once, as a guest star with Iron Maiden at a one-off show in Donington in 1992.

In 1993, Smith formed a band called The Untouchables, with the idea of playing only small club shows. The Untouchables never released any records, and by 1994, they evolved to Psycho Motel, which recorded two studio albums and toured with Iron Maiden in 1996 and 1997. In 1997, Smith joined Bruce Dickinson's backing band and eventually they both rejoined Iron Maiden in 1999.

== Track listing - Silver and Gold (album) ==
All songs written by Barnett/Colwell/Smith/Young

1. "The Lion" - 3:54
2. "Silver and Gold" - 4:50
3. "Down the Wire" - 5:06
4. "You Could Be a King" - 3:38
5. "After the Storm" - 5:50
6. "Misunderstood" - 4:25
7. "Kid Gone Astray" - 4:24
8. "Fallen Heroes" - 4:32
9. "Wishing Your Life Away" - 4:05
10. "Blood on the Ocean" - 6:01

== Track listing - "Silver and Gold" (CD single) ==
1. "Silver and Gold (12" Remix)" (Barnett/Colwell/Smith/Young) - 4:47
2. "Blood Brothers (Alternative Version)" (Barnett/Colwell/Smith/Young) - 3:33
3. "Fighting Man" (Barnett/Colwell) - 3:56

== Track listing - "Down the Wire" (CD single) ==
1. "Down the Wire (Long Distance Mix)" (Barnett/Colwell/Smith/Young)
2. "When She's Gone" (Smith)
3. "School Days" (Barnett/Colwell)

== Personnel - Silver and Gold (1989) ==
- Adrian Smith - lead and rhythm guitars, acoustic guitar, lead vocals
- Andy Barnett - lead, acoustic and slide guitars, backing vocals
- Dave Colwell - lead, rhythm and acoustic guitars, backing vocals
- Richard Young - keyboards, sequence programming
- Robin Clayton - bass
- Zak Starkey - drums, percussion

Additional personnel

- Stevie Lange - backing vocals on "After the Storm"
- Johnny Diesel - lead vocal on middle 8 and backing vocals on "Misunderstood"
