= Jackson DK2M =

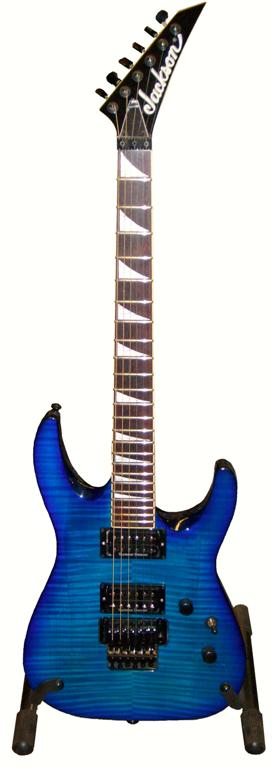
- Manufacturer: Jackson Guitars
- Period: 2006-2010

Construction
- Body type: Solid
- Neck joint: Bolt-on

Woods
- Body: Alder, Basswood
- Neck: Maple
- Fretboard: Ebony, Rosewood, Maple

Hardware
- Bridge: Locking tremolo, Fixed String-Thru
- Pickup: H-H

Colors available
- White, Black, Transparent Red, Transparent Blue, Transparent Black, Silverburst

The Jackson DK2M is a superstrat variant of the Dinky line of electric guitars made by Jackson Guitars, specifically the Pro Series. Introduced in January 2006, at one point it became Jackson's top import seller until it was dropped from the 2010 line. Its full name is the Jackson Pro Series DK2M Dinky (Model #291-1005) and was manufactured in Japan using bolt-on neck construction in a scale length of 25.5”. The DK2M had a 2007 MSRP of $857–999, depending on finish, while street price ranged from $600–700. The Jackson DK2M was reintroduced to the market in 2012, and is now manufactured in Mexico. A molded case is optional.

== Body ==
The DK2M uses an alder body in the classic Soloist/Dinky shape with a bevel in the bottom horn cutaway (for non-veneer finishes), while no pickguard is used as the controls are rear mounted. The back of the body in the neck pocket area is mildly scalloped for easier access to the higher frets.

== Neck ==
The neck is constructed of rock maple giving this guitar its distinctive name DK2M, in which the M designates the fretboard's maple material. The DK2M also features a scarf joint to orient the Jackson 6-In-Line Pointed Headstock back at a 12-degree angle. The Compound 12” to 16” Radius fretboard is unfinished maple, has 24 jumbo nickel frets. Early models feature black Delrin sharkfin shaped inlays while later models feature off-set black dot inlays. An overhang is used for the last fret. The fretboard and headstock are bound in black, with white dot sidemarkers. Specifications for the Floyd Rose style locking nut is a width of 1-11/16”. Factory installed NPS strings are used, in gauges .009, .011, .016, .024, .032, and .042

== Electronics ==
Pickup configuration consists of two genuine Seymour Duncan humbuckers: a TB-4 at the bridge, and an SH-2N at the neck. The pickups are connected to rear-mounted controls consisting of a shared volume dome knob and a tone dome knob, with a 3-Position blade selector switch below the knobs, 2013 models are equipped with 5 position switch, which enables coil splitting configurations in positions 2 and 4. (Pos. 1 Bridge H, Pos. 2 S/S, Pos. 3 H/H, Pos. 4 Neck S and Pos. 5 Neck H). A 1/4" mono audio cable jack is bottom mounted on the body, which is secured with a black metal football plate. also some custom LTD runs contain EMG 81/85 active humbucker pickups (some newer runs have the ZW EMG set.)

== Hardware ==
The double locking bridge is a Floyd Rose licensed Jackson Low Profile JT-580 LP Double Locking 2-Point Tremolo, mounted in a routed recess. The headstock utilizes Jackson branded die-cast tuners supplied by Jin-Ho of Korea (model #J-07). These parts and the other minor bits (strap buttons, knobs) are coated in black enamel.

== Finishes ==
The DK2M was offered in nine different standard finishes for the body, with three price levels. Finishes in the MSRP $857 range consist of Black, Cobalt Blue, Inferno Red, and Snow White. The MSRP $928 was reserved for the Transparent Black, Transparent Blue and Transparent Red finishes, which cover a flame maple veneer. Finally, the highest priced range of MSRP $999 consisted of two swirl finishes: Crimson Swirl and Eerie Dess Swirl. On all finishes the headstock is natural, with the Jackson logo in a black decal.

== LTD ==
The 2007 Jackson DK2M (A.M.S. Exclusive Collection) came in "White Bengal Custom Graphics" and was loaded with EMG 81/85 active pickups. more recently a Blue Bengal was offered with EMG 81/85 Zakk Wylde signature ZW EMG's (with the solderless wiring harness.)
