= Lado Guitars =

Canadian guitar manufacturing company

- Type: Private
- Industry: Musical instruments
- Founded: 1973; 53 years ago
- Founder: Joe Kovacic ("Joe Lado")
- Headquarters: Ontario, Canada
- Key people: Joe Lado
- Products: Electric guitars, basses

Lado Musical Inc. (popularly known as Lado Guitars, also J.K. Lado & Co. as seen on early-model headstocks) is a Canadian guitar manufacturing company owned and operated by Joe Kovacic (artistic name "Joe Lado"). The company is based in Lindsay, Ontario and produces electric guitars and basses.

== History ==
Joseph Kovacic was born in Croatia in 1945. After serving in the Yugoslav People's Army, he began training as a luthier at the Zagreb School of Guitar Making in Zagreb, followed by two years additional training at Crossman Guitar Works in Vienna, Austria.

Joe immigrated to Canada from Croatia in 1968 and began working for Turner Musical Instruments, a division of Gibson for two years, followed by a job with Hagström Guitars as an inspector for one year.

In 1971, having reached a workable level of English, Joe began his own business called "Joe's Strings" from a basement shop on Gerrard Street, in Toronto. In 1973, he formed "Lado Musical Inc." and opened a retail shop on Kingston Road, in Toronto. In addition to building Lado Guitars, Lado had an exclusive repair contract with C.F. Martin Guitars for all of Canada.

Around 1976, the demand for Lado Guitars had grown so much that he moved to a bigger facility in Scarborough. The 1981 Lado catalogue shows Lado Guitars to have moved again to a new facility –this time located on R.R. #1 in Uxbridge, Ontario, with a photographed staff of 13 employees.

In 1987, Lado built a 14’ 3" tall, 309 lb "Earth" model guitar, deemed "largest built and presumably the loudest playable electric guitar" by the Guinness Book of World Records. The record was held from 1987-1991.

The 1988 Lado catalogue shows Lado Guitars to have moved from the Uxbridge factory to a new one on Warden Avenue, in Scarborough, ON. In the 1988 film Eddie and the Cruisers II: Eddie Lives!, the band can be seen playing Lado guitars and basses.

In 2003, Kovacic started the "Lado School of Lutherie", a way to slow down his pace as he was reaching retirement, and also to pass on his craftsmanship and trade secrets to a younger generation of luthiers. Today, Lado Musical Inc. is located in Lindsay, Ontario.

== The story behind the "Lado" name ==
As his major final assignment as a lutherie student, he built a double bass which, upon completion, he gave to Croatian professional folk dance group "LADO", named after a Slavic word often used as a refrain in ceremonial songs of Croatia, and is a synonym for words meaning "good", "love", and "dear".

In return for the double bass, the Lado group told Joe that he had their blessing to use the Lado name for his instruments.

== Distinctive characteristics of a Lado instrument ==
- Headstocks always show the image of a falcon along with the name of the company. It is not to be confused with an eagle or a hawk, with the exception of the early J.K Lado & Co. headstocks.
- Necks are made of multiple laminates of hardwood, rather than one solid block. Three-piece necks are most common.
- Most of the classic Lado instruments are "neck-through-body" designs.
- The back of the headstock bears a serial number with the model name, or a short-code for the model (such as "SF-1" for a Superfalcon guitar), as well as "CDN" or "CND" to designate the instrument as being Canadian-made.

== Models ==
=== Electric guitars ===
Some of the guitar models manufactured by Lado are:

- Standard
- Solo
- Solo III
- Solo Doubleneck (6+12)
- Condor (Note: Affectionately known by Joe as "The Cock".)
- Falcon (F-1)
- Superfalcon (SF-1)
- Zebra (Z-1)
- Zebra Doubleneck (6+12)
- Flying V (FV 200 Series)
- Kelly Fleck 335
- Supra I Superstrat shape, 1 humbucker
- Supra III Superstrat shape, 3 single coils
- Classic series (Note: Superstrat guitars of numerous variations. The "Rocker", and "Golden Wing" are part of this series.)
- Earth model (Note: A radical take on the classic Gibson Explorer shape, popularized by Iron Maiden's Adrian Smith)
- Elite model (Note: Reminiscent of the Paul Reed Smith shape.)
- JK Custom G-32 (Note: A Gibson Les Paul-styled shape with a semi-hollow body.)
- Vintage TL (Note: Reminiscent of the Fender Telecaster shape.)
- Vintage ST (Note: Reminiscent of the Fender Stratocaster shape.)
- Hawk
- Seagull (Note: Possibly a one-off custom - copy of the B.C. Rich Seagull.)
- Devil
- R1 (Rocker guitar) - Source: a conversation with JK Lado company rep. (Note: More info is needed to find out what "R" is short-code for.)
- Lazer (Note: Similar in shape to an Earth save for a slight alteration at the bottom of the guitar, forgoing the smooth contour of the Earth. Very limited manufacturing run. It was famously used by Adrian Smith during the Seventh Son of a Seventh Son Tour for the song "Can I Play With Madness".)
- Rhoads (Note: A one off, custom copy of a Jackson Randy Rhoads signature model. It featured Lado designed pickups as well as a Floyd Rose Tremolo.)

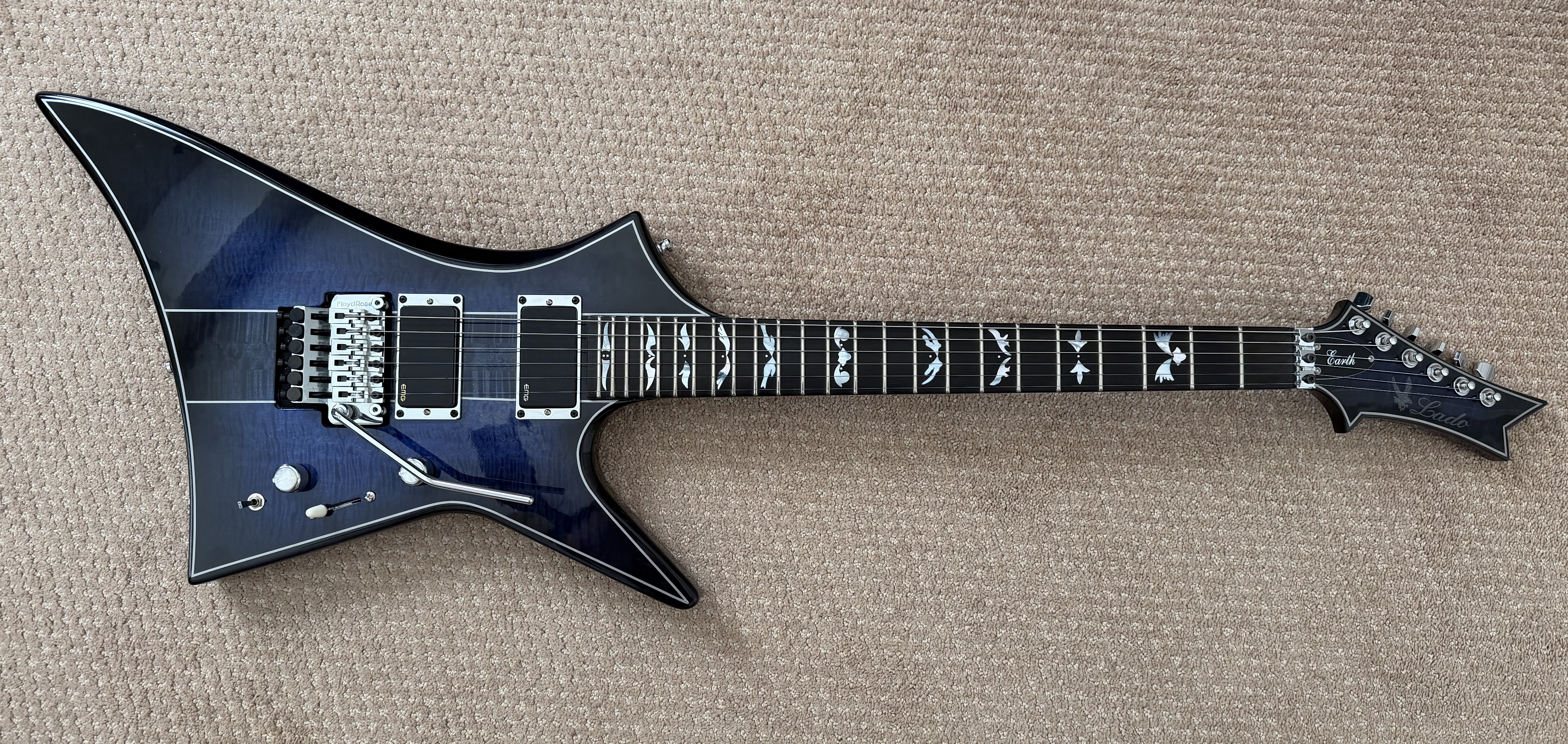
Lado Earth Guitar with a Floyd Rose locking tremolo bridge and EMG pickups.

=== Bass guitars ===
Some of the basses manufactured by Lado are:

- Standard II (Note: Bass version of the Standard I guitar.)
- Signature
- Solo 1 and 2
- Legend
- Matrix
- Medallion
- Moonstone
- R2 (Rocker bass) - Source: a conversation with JK Lado company rep.
