= 21 Guns (band) =

American rock band (1990–2000)

- Origin: Los Angeles, California, U.S.
- Genre: Hard rock
- Years active: 1990–2000
- Past members: Scott Gorham; Leif Johansen; Mike Sturgis; Hans-Olav Solli; Tommy LaVerdi

21 Guns was an American melodic hard rock band formed in the early 1990s by Thin Lizzy guitarist Scott Gorham, bass guitarist Leif Johanson and drummer Mike Sturgis who met through their work with Tom Galley's and Wilfried Rimensberger's Phenomena. At the time the band was fronted by vocalist Tommy La Verdi, formerly of the band A440. A440 enjoyed moderate success with songs such as "Method to my Madness" and "Flair for the Dramatic". La Verdi was replaced for the second album by former Sons of Angels singer Hans-Olav Solli. The band was dissolved in 2000. Gorham and Johanson were reported to have joined forces again in 2008 and started to work on a new album and plan some concerts, but the idea appears to have sunk without a trace, with Gorham playing with Black Star Riders as of 2013.

They released two studio albums.

== Albums ==
- Salute (1992)
- Nothing's Real (1997)
- Demo-lition (2002)
