= Sons of Angels (Norwegian band) =

Norwegian hard rock band

Sons of Angels were a hard rock band from Oslo, Norway. Their first album was Cowgirl, which was also the title of their first single.

The members were Solli, Torstein, Lars K., and Geir Digernes, plus Staffan William-Olsson, who is Swedish. They released their first album in 1990 on May 11. Their first record sold over 150 000 copies. They made a music video of the song "Cowgirl". They returned in 2001 with a second album, Slumber with the Lion.

== Track list ==
1. Cowgirl
2. Spend the Night
3. Look Out For Love
4. Lonely Rose
5. Rock And Roll Star
6. Trance Dance
7. Would You Die For Me?
8. Could It Be Love
9. Fight
10. Fly

== Band members ==
- Hans-Olav Solli - vocals
- Torstein Bieler - bass, backing vocals
- Lars Kilevold - keyboards
- Staffan William-Olsson - guitar
- Geir Digernes - drums

== Notes ==
American / Japanese rock group Crush 40 (the main artists behind well known theme songs to Sonic the Hedgehog video games such as "Open Your Heart" from Sonic Adventure) were originally known as Sons of Angels. They did release an album entitled "Sons of Angels - Thrill of the Feel" in 2000. The band had to change their name later to Crush 40 due to the fact that there were already another Sons of Angels band in existence.
