= Adrian Smith (musician) =

English guitarist (born 1957)

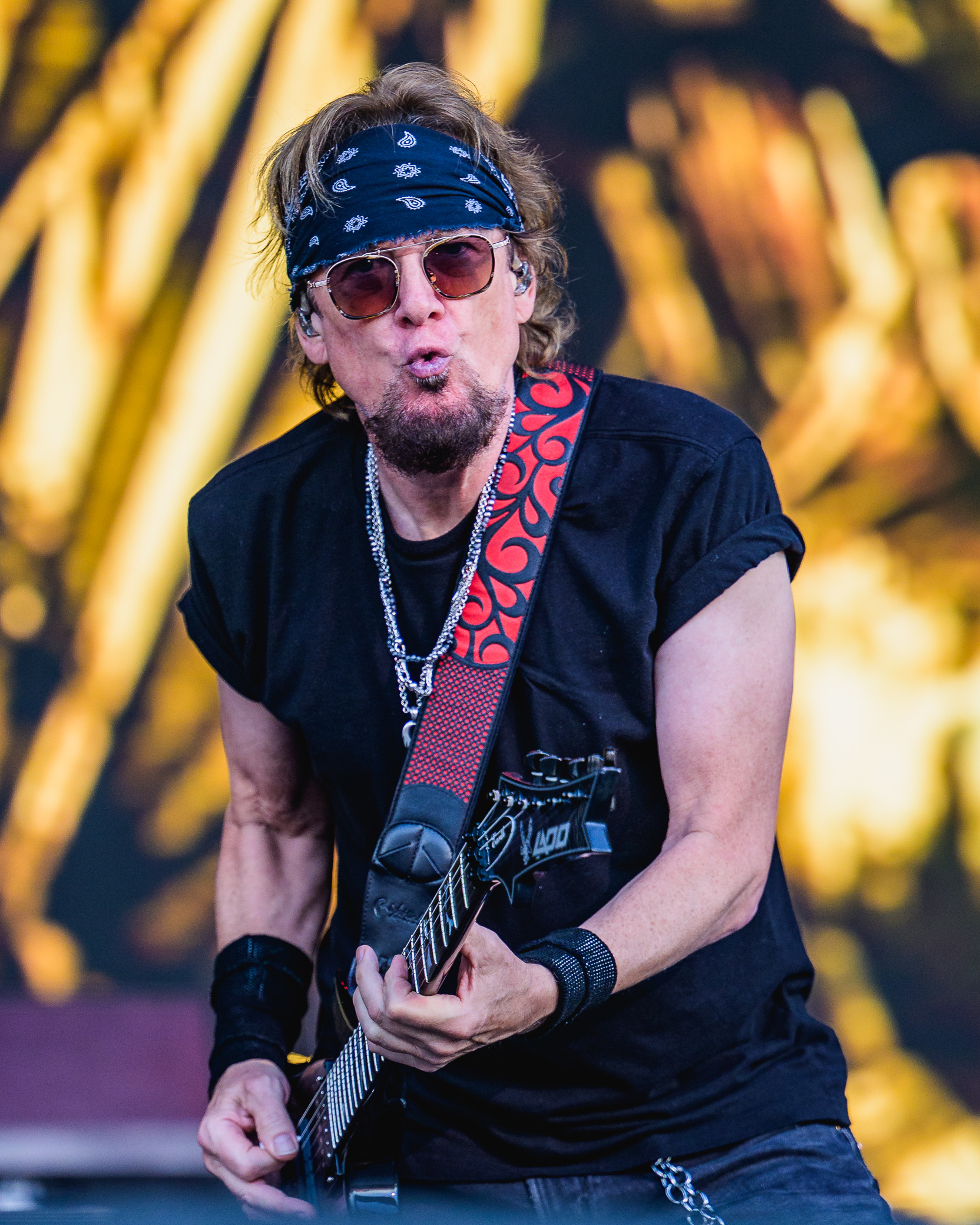
- Smith performing with Iron Maiden at Tons of Rock in 2026

Background information
- Born: Adrian Frederick Smith; 27 February 1957 (age 69); Hackney, London, England
- Genres: Heavy metal; progressive rock; hard rock
- Occupations: Musician; songwriter
- Instruments: Guitar; vocals
- Years active: 1972–present
- Labels: DJM; EMI; Capitol; Harvest; Enigma; Victor; Sanctuary; Raw Power; Castle; CMC; Air Raid; Columbia; Portrait; Parlophone; Spinefarm; BMG
- Website: ironmaiden.com

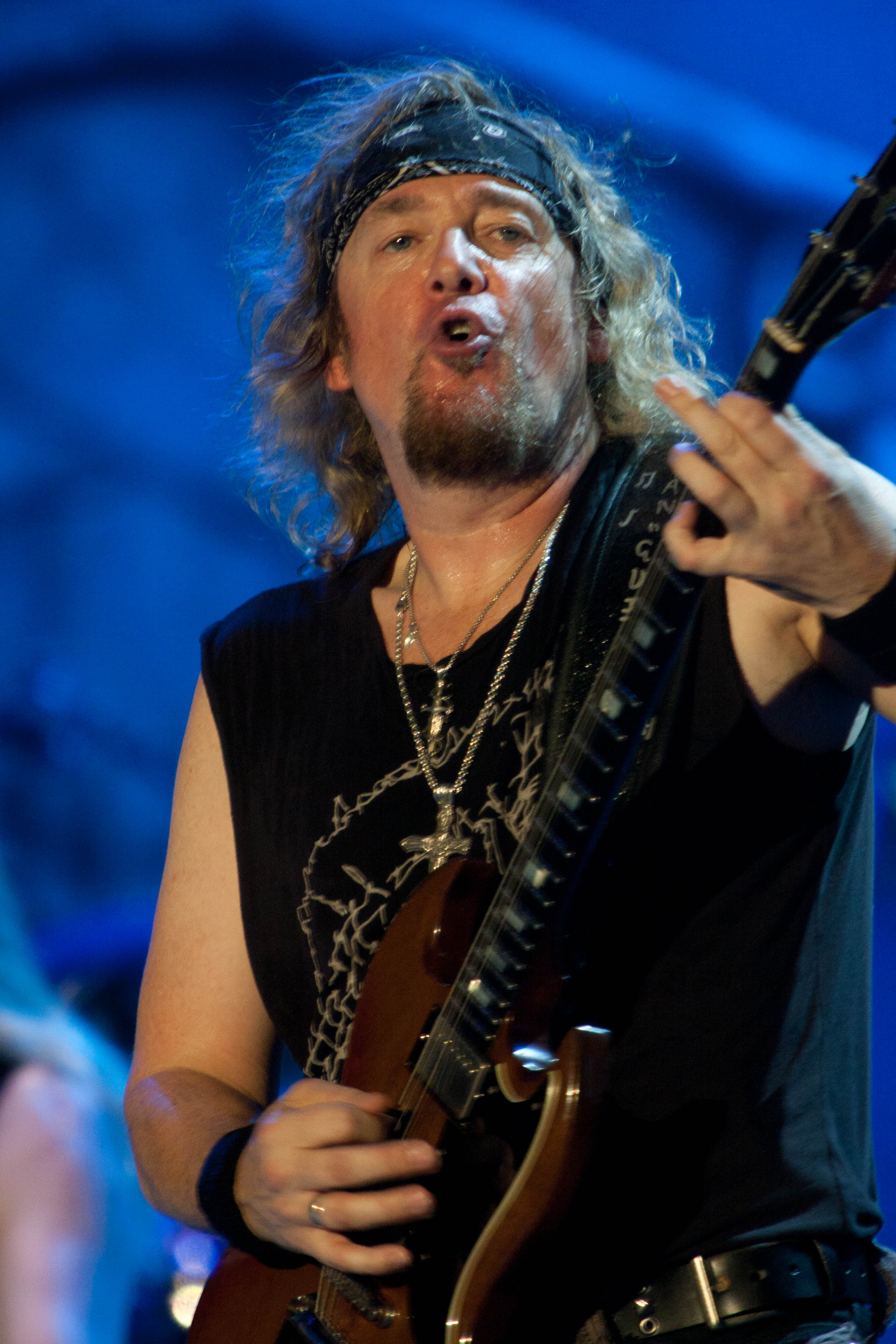
Smith performing with Iron Maiden at Ottawa Bluesfest in 2010

Adrian Frederick Smith (born 27 February 1957) is an English guitarist and singer best known as a member of heavy metal band Iron Maiden, for whom he also writes songs and performs backing vocals.

Smith grew up in London and became interested in rock music at 15. He soon formed a friendship with future Iron Maiden guitarist Dave Murray, who inspired him to take up the guitar. After leaving school at 16, he formed the band Urchin, which he led until their demise in 1980. He joined Iron Maiden in November 1980, replacing Dennis Stratton. Following a short-lived solo project called ASAP, he left Iron Maiden in 1990 and, after a year-long hiatus, formed the band The Untouchables which later became Psycho Motel.

In 1997, Psycho Motel was put on hold when Smith joined the band of former Iron Maiden singer Bruce Dickinson. Smith and Dickinson would both return to Iron Maiden in 1999, after which the band gained new success. During his second tenure with Iron Maiden, Smith has also led the side projects Primal Rock Rebellion and Smith/Kotzen.

== Biography ==
=== Early years and Urchin: 1957–1980 ===
Born in Hackney, Smith grew up in Clapton. His father was a painter and decorator from Homerton. Smith has an older brother and a sister. As a child, he was "a Manchester United fanatic", although he would lose his interest in football once he got into music. He purchased his first record, Deep Purple's Machine Head, at age 15. Shortly thereafter, he met Dave Murray who lived in the same neighborhood. Smith and Murray formed a band called Stone Free, with Murray on guitar, Smith on vocals, and their friend Dave McCloughlin playing the bongos.

After seeing the attention Murray received from girls, Smith took up the guitar, starting with an old Spanish guitar once owned by his brother, before purchasing an old guitar of Murray's for £5. His early influences included Johnny Winter and Pat Travers, who he claims made him a "melodic player" rather than a "speed merchant or a shredder" as he "was inspired by blues rock rather than metal."

Leaving school after completing his O-levels, Smith formed the band Evil Ways, including Dave Murray on guitar, which was later renamed Urchin. Smith began writing his own material, including a song called "Countdown", which evolved into "22 Acacia Avenue" that later appeared on Iron Maiden's The Number of the Beast in 1982. While leading Urchin, Smith worked as a labourer and bricklayer on building sites in London, and as a water bailiff and fisheries officer at the Walthamstow Reservoirs.

Murray left Urchin in 1976 to join Iron Maiden. Urchin then signed with DJM Records and released the single "Black Leather Fantasy" in 1977. Shortly afterwards, Murray rejoined Urchin on their next single, "She's a Roller", as he had been temporarily sacked from Iron Maiden. Smith was also offered a position in Iron Maiden in 1979, but turned them down to focus on leading Urchin. Smith later regretted this decision as Urchin split up in 1980.

=== First tenure in Iron Maiden: 1980–1990 ===
Shortly after Urchin split, Smith encountered Steve Harris and Dave Murray on a street in his neighborhood, and the two asked him to reconsider joining Iron Maiden as the replacement for guitarist Dennis Stratton. This time Smith accepted the offer, and debuted with the band on the West German TV show Rockpop in Concert in Munich on 8 November 1980, (Note: Rockpop in Concert was a lip sync performance where the band played "Running Free" and "Remember Tomorrow".) before setting out on a UK tour and recording the Killers album in 1981. Smith's first songwriting contributions appeared on The Number of the Beast in 1982, co-penning "Gangland" and "The Prisoner", as well as the aforementioned "22 Acacia Avenue". He became a more active songwriter in Iron Maiden, often in collaboration with singer Bruce Dickinson, on the following Piece of Mind album.

Smith and Dave Murray often played dual lead guitars, creating what AllMusic calls "the most formidable twin-guitar attack in heavy metal, outside of Glenn Tipton and K. K. Downing." Smith, along with Steve Harris, also provides the band's backing vocals, and sang lead on "Reach Out", the B-side to the "Wasted Years" single, featuring Bruce Dickinson on backing vocals. Originally written by guitarist Dave "Bucket" Colwell, with whom he had worked on The Entire Population of Hackney project, Smith would later sing "Reach Out" again for Colwell's solo album, Guitars, Beers & Tears, released in 2010.

=== Departure from Iron Maiden and other projects: 1989–1999 ===
While Iron Maiden were taking some time off in 1989, Smith released a solo album with the band ASAP (Adrian Smith and Project), entitled Silver and Gold, which was a commercial failure in spite of a promotional club tour. Unhappy with the direction Iron Maiden were taking for their next release, No Prayer for the Dying, and feeling that he could not help enough in the creative work, Smith left the band in 1990 during the album's pre-production stages, and was replaced by Janick Gers. After two albums that explored progressive songwriting, bassist Steve Harris decided that the band should return to a "stripped-down" and "street level" approach, which Smith thought was a "step backward". No Prayer for the Dying contained one last Smith song, co-penned with Bruce Dickinson, entitled "Hooks in You".

After leaving Iron Maiden, Smith started a family, and also auditioned to replace Steve Clark in Def Leppard, a position which ultimately went to Vivian Campbell. Smith joined Iron Maiden onstage at Donington Park in 1992 for "Running Free". That performance appeared on the live album Live at Donington. In the same year, after hearing King's X for the first time, he decided that he would "love to play in a band like that" and formed The Untouchables, which later became Psycho Motel. The band recorded two albums, State of Mind in 1995 and Welcome to the World in 1997, and supported Iron Maiden on the British leg of The X Factour. Psycho Motel was put on hold when Smith joined Bruce Dickinson's band for the album Accident of Birth in 1997 and The Chemical Wedding in 1998.

=== Return to Iron Maiden: 1999–present ===
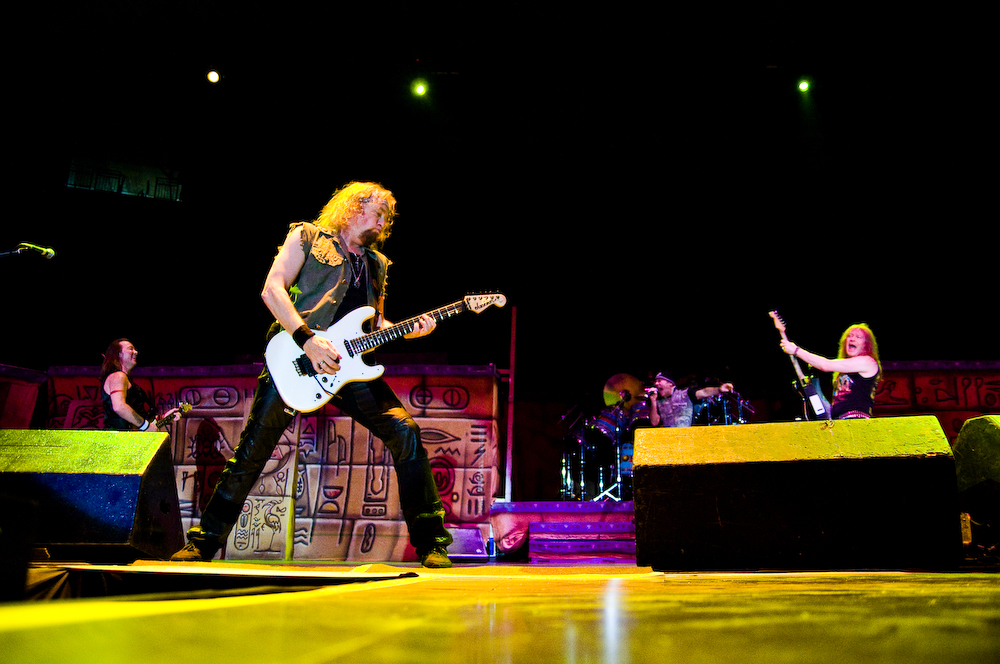
Smith performing with Iron Maiden during the Somewhere Back in Time World Tour

In 1999, Smith rejoined Iron Maiden, along with Dickinson, who commented, "When he [Smith] left the band in 1990, I think everybody was a bit surprised at how much we missed him and certainly, I don't think anybody had realized how much the fans would miss him – big time. I wouldn't have rejoined Iron Maiden if he wasn't in the band. I just don't think it would have been complete without Adrian, and now, it's great having three guitarists." Smith himself recalled, "Now, when I rejoined, we were all a bit older and wiser. We just gave each other a bit more headroom. And it's great. [...] If you're in a band and you're just playing for yourself, it's only gonna work for a limited amount of time. And you see bands breaking up all the time because one guy wants a spotlight and the other guy is jealous, and, you know, there's all this stuff." The band embarked on a short tour, after which the new lineup's first album, Brave New World, was recorded with producer Kevin Shirley and released in 2000.

Smith remains in Iron Maiden to the present, and since his return they have released five additional studio albums. Smith claims that his guitar playing improved after leaving the band in 1990, in particular while working with Roy Z, from whom he "learned a lot about picking" and became "more disciplined". Since returning to Iron Maiden, he has experimented with tuning, stating that he has used drop D tuning in live renditions of "Run to the Hills", "Wrathchild", "The Trooper". and "Hallowed Be Thy Name". Although Smith had previously been known to contribute shorter and more "commercial" tracks, since his return to the band he has penned many longer songs, beginning with "Paschendale" from Dance of Death.

==== Side projects ====
In 2011, Smith formed the side project Primal Rock Rebellion with Mikee Goodman. They released the album, Awoken Broken, in 2012. In 2020, Smith collaborated with Richie Kotzen under the name Smith/Kotzen. Ultimate Classic Rock described the project's sound as a mixture of blues, traditional R&B, and hard rock. Their self-titled debut album was released in March 2021. Their second album, Black Light/White Noise, was announced in November 2024 and released in April 2025.

== Personal life ==
In his spare time, Smith is a keen angler, revealing that he used to take "worms and maggots" with him on tour, and was featured on the front cover of Angler's Mail on 25 August 2009. In 1988 he married Nathalie Dufresne-Smith, who currently works for Maiden Flight, a cancer awareness/patient rights organisation, and the pair have three children.

Smith released the book Monsters of River and Rock in 2020. The book primarily details Smith's love of fishing, and relates anecdotes from his many decades of pursuing the hobby whilst touring and recording with Iron Maiden. Smith stated that around 70% of his book was focused upon fishing, with the remaining content discussing his music career. In its review of the publication, MetalTalk described the book as "a prize catch amongst rock biographies – highly recommended." Another one of Smith’s personal interests is tennis, which he plays multiple times per week and has credited with helping keeping himself in shape.

In January 2025, Smith lost his Malibu house in the Southern California wildfires.

== Recognition ==
Smith is ranked #8 on Total Guitar's list of the Greatest Metal Guitarists of All Time, #28 on Loudwire's Best 75 Hard Rock/Metal Guitarists of All Time. In conjunction with his Iron Maiden bandmates Dave Murray and (later) Janick Gers, Smith was ranked #11 in the list of the 100 greatest metal guitarists of all time according to Guitar World magazine, #4 in the list of the greatest metal guitarists of all time according to Metal Hammer, and #83 in Rolling Stone's list of the 250 Greatest Guitarists of All Time. In 2026 Smith was inducted into the Rock and Roll Hall of Fame as a member of Iron Maiden.

== Style and influence ==
Ultimate Guitar described Smith as "the golden standard for a heavy metal guitarist — a perfect team player who enhances the songs with punchy riffs and catchy hooks, and knows when (and when not) to take the spotlight and let it rip." In a 2025 interview with Sonic Perspective Smith explained that he was influenced by the second generation of blues guitarists. Such as Paul Kossoff, members of Thin Lizzy, and Michael Schenker, he also stated "But I was never be like a shredding kind of guitar [player], so more melodic. I like the space, I like the feel, so that’s what I try and do."

Compared to his fellow Iron Maiden guitarist Dave Murray and Janick Gers Smith has stated that the two have a similar playing style to each other however it’s different than his. Gers described Smiths style in a h2015 interview stating "He’s very rhythmic. Even when he’s soloing, you hear a certain kind of rhythm that’s different from what Dave and I do."

According to Quentin Thane Singer of Forbes, "Adrian Smith and Dave Murray’s dueling guitar harmonies, galloping riffs and epic guitar solos have influenced nearly every significant band to come out of the metal genre since the mid ‘80s. As the primary guitarists for Iron Maiden, Smith and Murray helped to popularize anthemic lead guitar playing, which has consequently become a staple in metal music for the last 40-plus years."

== Equipment ==
=== Guitars ===
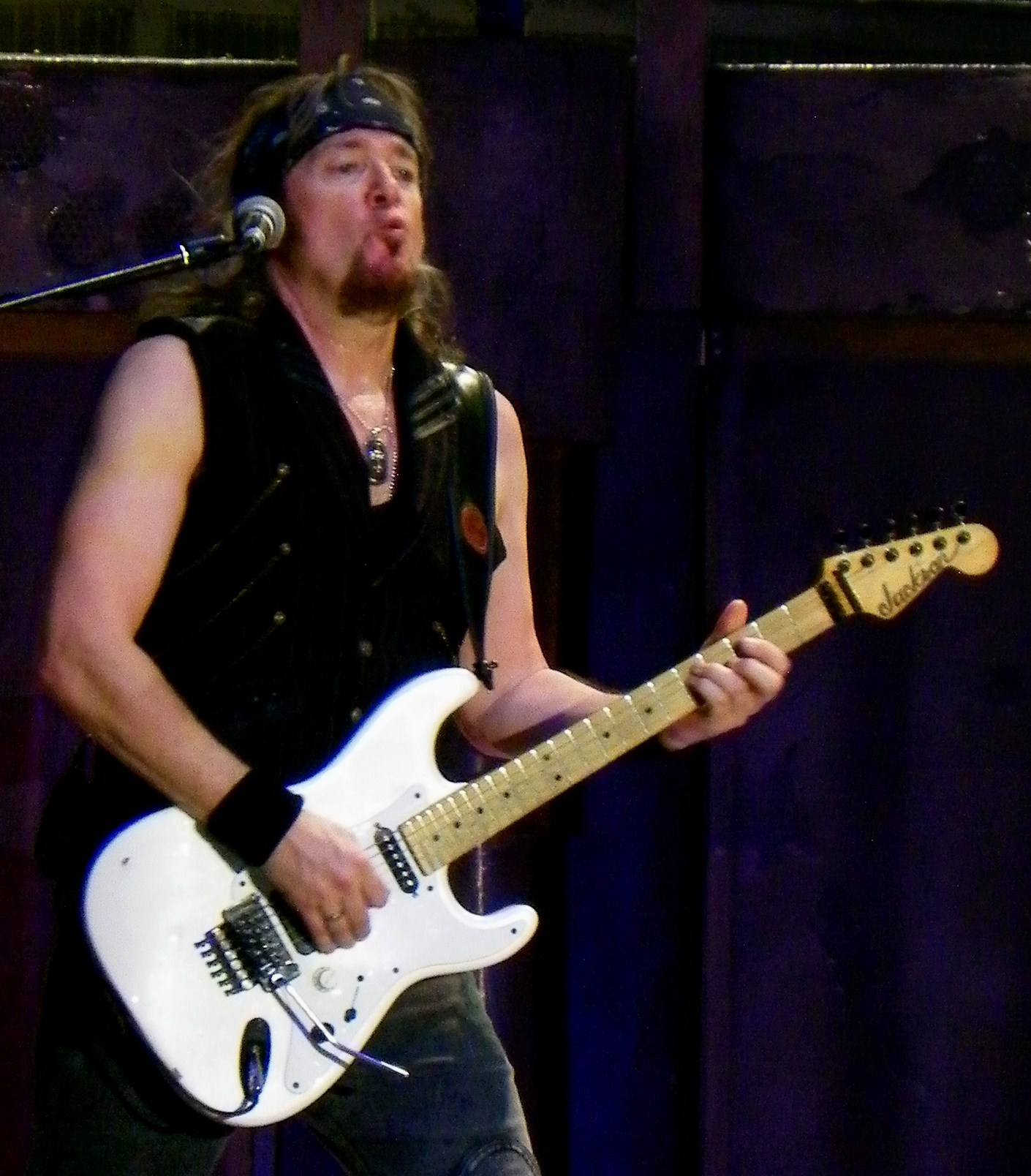
Smith performing with a Jackson guitar

Smith currently prefers to use his Jackson signature "San Dimas" Dinky, although he has used a variety of guitars over his career, including several different Dean models, various Jacksons (including the Randy Rhoads model), Fender Stratocasters (including three Fender Floyd Rose Classic Stratocasters; one with an added Roland midi pick-up), Gibson Les Pauls, Gibson Explorers, Gibson SGs, an Ibanez Destroyer, a Hamer Scarab, and Lado Guitars. On the A Matter of Life and Death DVD, he says the first decent guitar he bought was a Deluxe Gold Top 1972 Gibson Les Paul, which he paid £235 for when he was 17, in 1974. He still uses it to this day, stating that "it's still probably the best guitar I've got".

As of 2010, his touring guitars included a 1972 Gibson Les Paul Deluxe Goldtop with a DiMarzio Super Distortion in the bridge position, his Jackson Superstrat 1986 prototype (which can be seen in the Maiden England video) with the pickguard changed to resemble his signature model, a Jackson Signature model with black scratchplate and maple neck, an early 70s Gibson SG, and another Jackson, inspired by his Les Paul Goldtop.

As of August 2007, Smith endorses Jackson Guitars, his first guitar company endorsement in over fifteen years. With Jackson he has released two signature models, a San Dimas Dinky and an SDX. Prior to his endorsement, he was seen using other Jackson guitars, such as a King V during his time in Bruce Dickinson's solo band, before he went to Fender guitars. In August 2008, one of his Jackson guitars was stolen from backstage at a show in Greece.

=== Effects, controllers and processors ===
- Dunlop Uni-vibe Wah Controller
- Dunlop Cry Baby Wah
- Yamaha MFC10 Midi Foot Controller
- DigiTech Whammy Pedal
- DigiTech Eric Clapton Crossroads
- Two Ibanez TS-808 Tube Screamers
- Duesenberg Channel 2 overdrive/distortion
- Mike Hill B.I.S. Isolation hole
- Lexicon MX200 multi-effects unit
- Boss DD-3 Digital Delay
- Boss CH-1 Super Chorus
- Boss CS-3 Compression Sustainer

=== Amplifiers ===
- Two 300-Watt Marshall 1960A Angled-Front 4x12 Cabs loaded with 75-Watt Celestion G12-T75 Speakers
- Two Marshall 30th Anniversary 6100LM 100-Watt All-Tube Heads
- Two Marshall DSL100 JCM2000 Amplifiers
- Marshall 9200 Rack Power Amp
- Marshall JVM410H
- Blackstar Series One 104EL34
- Blackstar Series One 1046L6
- Blackstar HT-5

=== Units and tuners ===
- Shure U4 Wireless Receiver
- Whirlwind Multi-Selector 4-Channel Selector
- Dunlop DCR-1SR Rack Wah
- Peavey Tubefex Tube Preamp & Multi-Fx Unit
- Marshall JMP-1 Valve Midi Preamp
- ADA MP-1 Valve Midi Preamp, T.C Electronic 2290 Delay with Marshall 9000 series valve power amps during "Ed Hunter" and "Brave New World" Tours (1999-2001)

== Discography ==
Urchin

- "Black Leather Fantasy" (1977)
- "She's A Roller" (1977)
- Urchin (2004) – Best of/Compilation

Iron Maiden

Main article: Iron Maiden discography
- Killers (1981)
- The Number of the Beast (1982)
- Piece of Mind (1983)
- Powerslave (1984)
- Somewhere in Time (1986)
- Seventh Son of a Seventh Son (1988)
- Brave New World (2000)
- Dance of Death (2003)
- A Matter of Life and Death (2006)
- The Final Frontier (2010)
- The Book of Souls (2015)
- Senjutsu (2021)

A.S.A.P.

- Silver and Gold (1989)

Psycho Motel

- State of Mind (1995)
- Welcome to the World (1997)

Bruce Dickinson

Main article: Bruce Dickinson discography
- Accident of Birth (1997)
- The Chemical Wedding (1998)

Primal Rock Rebellion

- Awoken Broken (2012)

Smith/Kotzen

- Smith/Kotzen (2021)
- Black Light/White Noise (2025)

Guest appearances

- Earthshaker – Earthshaker (1983) – "Dark Angels (Animals)" (writing credits only)
- Obús – El que más (1984) – "Alguien" (writing credits only)
- Hear 'n Aid – "Stars" (1985)
- Iron Maiden – Live at Donington (1992) – "Running Free"
- Michael Kiske – Instant Clarity (1996) – "The Calling", "New Horizons", "Hunted"
- Humanary Stew: A Tribute to Alice Cooper (also released as: Welcome to Nightmare: An All-Star Salute To Alice Cooper) (1998) – "Black Widow"
- Dave Colwell – Guitars, Beers & Tears (2010) – Lead vocals on "Reach Out", lead vocals and lead guitar on "Make Up Your Mind"
- Kym Mazelle – Destiny (2010) – Writer, producer, guitar, bass and backing vocals on "My Shoes"
- The Royal Philharmonic Orchestra Plays the Music of Rush (2012) – "Red Barchetta"
- Celtic Pride – Light Up The Sky (2012) – Guitar solo on "The Patriot"

== Awards and nominations ==
As a member of Iron Maiden Smith has received numerous nominations, honours and awards including Grammy Awards and equivalents awards in many countries, Brit Awards, Ivor Novello Awards, Rockbjörnen Awards , and Juno Awards. In 2016 Smith and Iron Maiden were given the titles of Honorary Visitors of the Country Award in El Salvador. In 2019 Smith and the rest of Iron Maiden all individually received the Relief Salon De Los Pasos Perdidos – State prize for their contribution to the development of Argentina’s culture and music. It was the first time it was awarded to artists outside of Argentina.

Year	Award	Category	Result
2005	Hollywood's RockWalk	As a member of Iron Maiden	Inducted
2007	Metal Hammer Golden Gods Awards	Riff Lord (shared with Janick Gers, Dave Murray)	Nominated
2011	Revolver Golden Gods Awards	Guitarist of the Year	Nominated
2026	Rock and Roll Hall of Fame	Hall of Fame	Inducted

== Literature ==
- "Juno Winners – 2010 Gala Dinner & Awards". Juno Awards. 18 April 2010. Archived from the original on 26 April 2012.
- "Iron Maiden honoured with Ivor Novello award". Sanctuary Group. 18 September 2002. Archived from the original (Official Website) on 10 March 2007.
- Wall, Mick (2004). Iron Maiden: Run to the Hills, the Authorised Biography (third ed.). Sanctuary Publishing. ISBN 1-86074-542-3.
