= Mike Sturgis =

American drummer

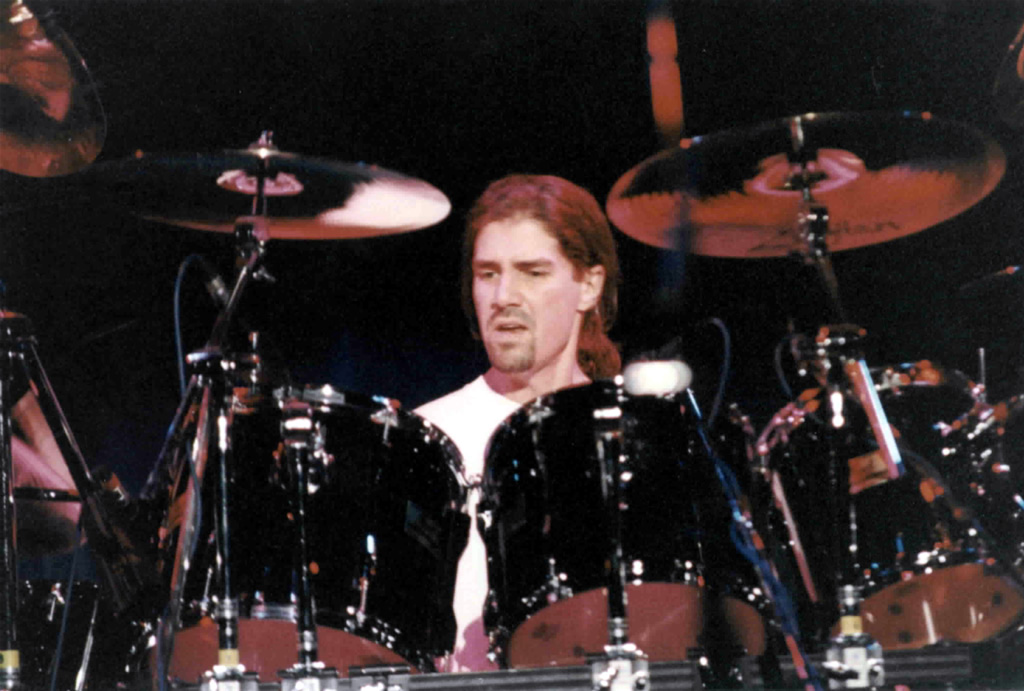
- Sturgis in concert in 1995 with Wishbone Ash

Background information
- Genres: Hard rock, progressive rock, pop rock
- Occupations: Musician
- Instruments: Drums, percussion
- Years active: 1986–present
- Formerly of: 21 Guns, Asia, Wishbone Ash, Psycho Motel, Phenomena, A-ha, Summerhill

Mike Sturgis is an American drummer, having played for the band 21 Guns and later with Iron Maiden guitarist Adrian Smith in Psycho Motel, where he played on both State of Mind (1996) and Welcome to the World (1997) albums. He was also the drummer for Wishbone Ash between 1995 and 1997 and drummer for Asia between 1994 and 2001.

Sturgis began drumming at the age of ten and from 1982 to 1986 attended the University of Miami, where he received a degree in studio music and jazz. From 1986 to 1987, he toured with Norwegian band A-ha and played on "The Swing of Things", "I've Been Losing You" and "Soft Rains of April" from the album Scoundrel Days. During that time he was asked by Phenomena executive producer Wilfried Rimensberger to join the superstar rock project, where he played drums on the Phenomena II: Dream Runner album and got to know Scott Gorham and John Wetton, who both participated in that recording.

He has performed live or recorded with such major pop, rock and jazz names as David Bowie, Elton John, A-ha, Asia, Jack Bruce, Steve Winwood, Tom Jones, Wishbone Ash, Bob James, Randy Brecker and Bob Mintzer. He currently performs with jazz-funk group Redtenbacher's Funkestra.

Sturgis was head of drums at the Academy of Contemporary Music in Guildford for 13 years. He is currently the head of education at DIME Online.

Sturgis currently lives in England with his wife and two children. He played with Wishbone Ash on some dates of their 2021 UK tour.
